= Alan Jackson singles discography =

Alan Jackson discography
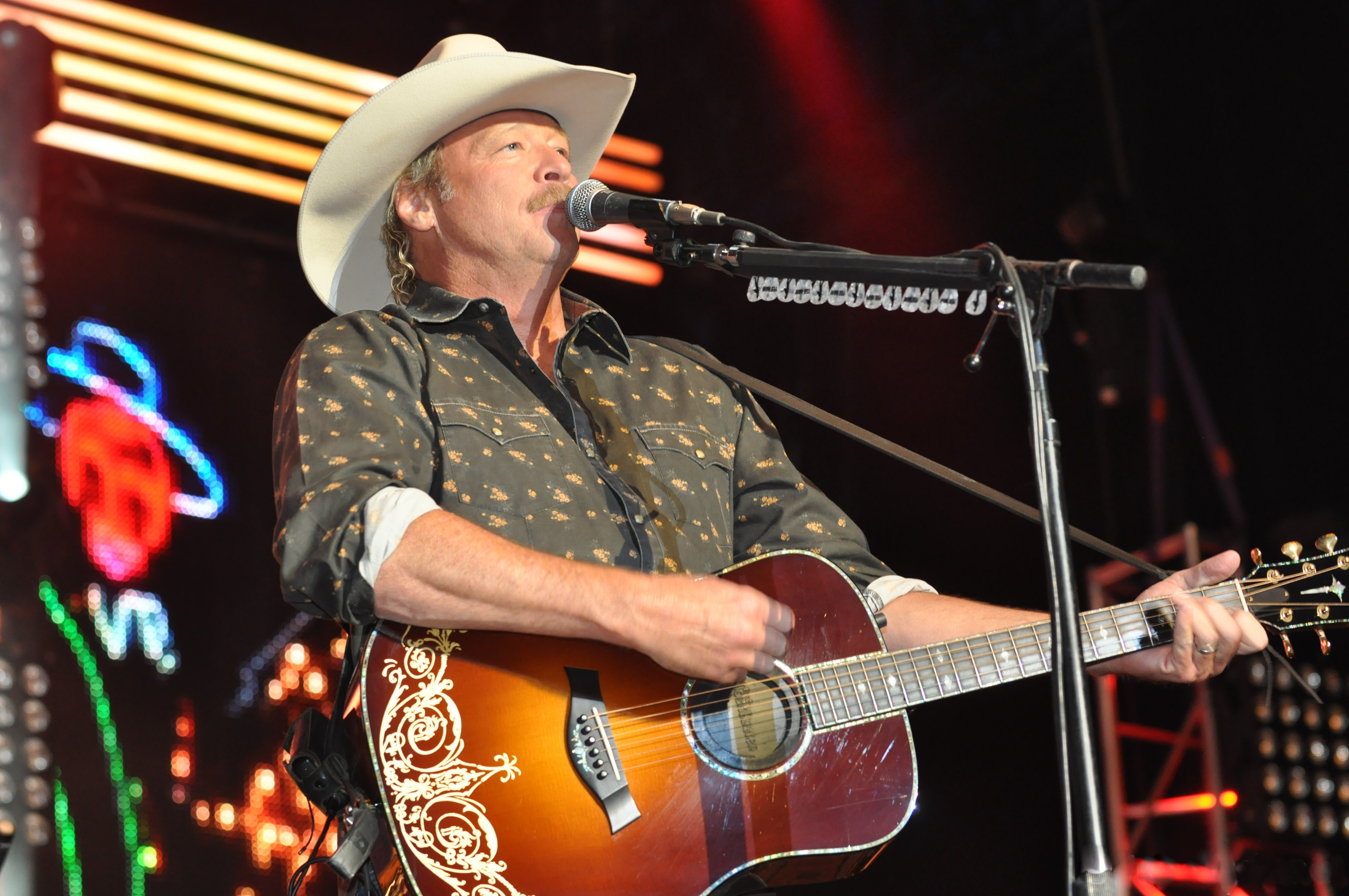
- Singles: 69
- Music videos: 54
- Other charted songs: 16
- #1 singles (US): 26
- #1 singles (Overall): 27

Alan Jackson is an American country music artist. The first artist signed to Arista Nashville Records, he was with them from 1989 to 2011. He has released 21 studio albums, two Christmas albums, 10 compilations, and a tribute album for the label, as well as 69 singles.

Out of his singles, all but seven have reached Top 40 or higher on the Billboard country singles charts, including 26 number one hits. Of these, two have been listed by Billboard as the number one song of the year on the Billboard Year-End charts: "Don't Rock the Jukebox" in 1991 and "Chattahoochee" in 1993. His longest-lasting number one country hit and biggest pop hit is "It's Five O'Clock Somewhere", a duet with Jimmy Buffett, which spent eight non-consecutive weeks at number one in 2003 and peaked at number 17 on the Billboard Hot 100.

== Singles ==
=== 1980s–1990s ===
Year	Single	Peak chart positions			Certifications (sales threshold)	Album
Year	Single	US Country	US	CAN Country	Certifications (sales threshold)	Album
1989	"Blue Blooded Woman"	45	—	86		Here in the Real World
1990	"Here in the Real World"	3	—	1	RIAA: Gold	Here in the Real World
1990	"Wanted"	3	—	3		Here in the Real World
1990	"Chasin' That Neon Rainbow"	2	—	5	RIAA: Platinum	Here in the Real World
1991	"I'd Love You All Over Again"	1	—	1		Here in the Real World
1991	"Don't Rock the Jukebox"	1	—	1	RIAA: Platinum	Don't Rock the Jukebox
1991	"Someday"	1	—	2		Don't Rock the Jukebox
1991	"Dallas"	1	—	1		Don't Rock the Jukebox
1992	"Midnight in Montgomery"	3	—	3	RIAA: Gold	Don't Rock the Jukebox
1992	"Love's Got a Hold on You"	1	—	1		Don't Rock the Jukebox
1992	"She's Got the Rhythm (And I Got the Blues)"	1	—	1		A Lot About Livin' (And a Little 'Bout Love)
1993	"Tonight I Climbed the Wall"	4	—	4		A Lot About Livin' (And a Little 'Bout Love)
1993	"Chattahoochee"	1	46	1	RIAA: 5× Platinum; RMNZ: Platinum	A Lot About Livin' (And a Little 'Bout Love)
1993	"Mercury Blues"	2	—	2		A Lot About Livin' (And a Little 'Bout Love)
1994	"(Who Says) You Can't Have It All"	4	—	11		A Lot About Livin' (And a Little 'Bout Love)
1994	"Summertime Blues"	1	— (Note: "Summertime Blues" did not enter the Hot 100, but peaked at number 4 on Bubbling Under Hot 100 Singles, which acts as a 25-song extension of the Hot 100.)	1	RIAA: Platinum	Who I Am
1994	"Livin' on Love"	1	— (Note: "Livin' on Love" did not enter the Hot 100, but peaked at number 1 on Bubbling Under Hot 100 Singles, which acts as a 25-song extension of the Hot 100.)	1	RIAA: 2× Platinum	Who I Am
1994	"Gone Country"	1	—	2	RIAA: 2× Platinum	Who I Am
1995	"Song for the Life"	6	—	11		Who I Am
1995	"I Don't Even Know Your Name"	1	—	4		Who I Am
1995	"Tall, Tall Trees"	1	—	1	RIAA: Gold	The Greatest Hits Collection
1996	"I'll Try"	1	—	5		The Greatest Hits Collection
1996	"Home" (Note: "Home" was originally included on Here in the Real World, and was later included on his The Greatest Hits Collection album and released to radio in 1996.)	3	—	5		The Greatest Hits Collection
1996	"Little Bitty"	1	58	2	RIAA: 2× Platinum; RMNZ: Gold	Everything I Love
1997	"Everything I Love"	9	—	6		Everything I Love
1997	"Who's Cheatin' Who"	2	—	3	RIAA: Gold	Everything I Love
1997	"There Goes"	1	—	1		Everything I Love
1997	"Between the Devil and Me"	2	—	3		Everything I Love
1998	"A House with No Curtains"	18	—	14		Everything I Love
1998	"I'll Go On Loving You"	3	—	2		High Mileage
1998	"Right on the Money"	1	43	1		High Mileage
1999	"Gone Crazy"	4	43	3		High Mileage
1999	"Little Man"	3	39	4		High Mileage
1999	"Pop a Top"	6	43	2	RIAA: Gold	Under the Influence
"—" denotes releases that did not chart

=== 2000s ===
Year	Single	Peak chart positions				Certifications (sales threshold)	Album
Year	Single	US Country	US	CAN Country (Note: Peak positions from RPM Country Singles from 1989 to 2000, Radio & Records from 2004 to 2005, and Canada Country from 2006 to present.)	CAN	Certifications (sales threshold)	Album
2000	"The Blues Man"	37	—	29	—	RIAA: Gold	Under the Influence
2000	"It Must Be Love"	1	37	4	—	RIAA: Gold	Under the Influence
2000	"www.memory"	6	45	26 (Note: "www.memory" reached number 26 when RPM ceased publication in November 2000.)	—		When Somebody Loves You
2001	"When Somebody Loves You"	5	52	×	—		When Somebody Loves You
2001	"Where I Come From"	1	34	×	—	RIAA: Platinum	When Somebody Loves You
2001	"It's Alright to Be a Redneck"	53	—	×	—		When Somebody Loves You
2001	"Where Were You (When the World Stopped Turning)"	1	28	×	—	RIAA: Platinum	Drive
2002	"Drive (For Daddy Gene)"	1	28	×	—	RIAA: 2× Platinum; RMNZ: Gold	Drive
2002	"Work in Progress"	3	35	×	—		Drive
2002	"That'd Be Alright"	2	29	×	—		Drive
2003	"It's Five O'Clock Somewhere" (with Jimmy Buffett)	1	17	×	—	RIAA: 5× Platinum; BPI: Silver; RMNZ: Gold	Greatest Hits Volume II
2003	"Remember When"	1	29	×	—	RIAA: 5× Platinum	Greatest Hits Volume II
2004	"Too Much of a Good Thing"	5	46	4	—		What I Do
2004	"Monday Morning Church"	5	54	4	—		What I Do
2005	"The Talkin' Song Repair Blues"	18	99	15	—		What I Do
2005	"USA Today"	18	— (Note: "USA Today" did not enter the Hot 100, but peaked at number 7 on Bubbling Under Hot 100 Singles, which acts as a 25-song extension of the Hot 100.)	—	—		What I Do
2006	"Like Red on a Rose"	15	80	14	—		Like Red on a Rose
2007	"A Woman's Love" (Note: "A Woman's Love" was originally included on High Mileage and was re-recorded for Like Red on a Rose.)	5	73	11	—		Like Red on a Rose
2007	"Small Town Southern Man"	1	42	3	62	RIAA: Platinum	Good Time
2008	"Good Time"	1	40	1	57	RIAA: 2× Platinum	Good Time
2008	"Country Boy"	1	49	1	61	RIAA: Platinum	Good Time
2009	"Sissy's Song"	9	61	6	67	RIAA: Gold	Good Time
2009	"I Still Like Bologna"	32	—	28	—		Good Time
"—" denotes releases that did not chart "×" indicates that no relevant chart existed or was archived

=== 2010s–2020s ===
Year	Single	Peak chart positions					Certifications (sales threshold)	Album
Year	Single	US Country	US Country Airplay	US Bubbling	CAN Country	CAN	Certifications (sales threshold)	Album
2010	"It's Just That Way"	16		3	17	—		Freight Train
2010	"Hard Hat and a Hammer"	17		7	11	99		Freight Train
2010	"Ring of Fire"	45		—	—	—		34 Number Ones
2011	"Long Way to Go"	24		20	25	—		Thirty Miles West
2012	"So You Don't Have to Love Me Anymore"	25		8	42	—		Thirty Miles West
2012	"You Go Your Way"	41	39	—	—	—		Thirty Miles West
2014	"A Million Ways to Die"	—	—	—	—	—		A Million Ways to Die in the West
2015	"Jim and Jack and Hank"	41	50	—	—	—		Angels and Alcohol
2016	"The One You're Waiting On"	—	—	—	—	—		Angels and Alcohol
2017	"The Older I Get"	—	—	—	—	—	RIAA: Gold	Where Have You Gone
2021	"Where Have You Gone"	—	—	—	—	—		Where Have You Gone
2021	"You'll Always Be My Baby"	—	—	—	—	—		Where Have You Gone
2021	"Racing the Dark"	—	—	—	—	—		non-album singles
2026	"Still the One"	—	—	—	—	—		non-album singles
"—" denotes releases that did not chart

== Other singles ==
=== Featured singles ===
Year	Single	Artist	Peak chart positions						Album
Year	Single	Artist	US Country	US Country Airplay	US	CAN Country	CAN	AUS	Album
1994	"A Good Year for the Roses"	George Jones	56		—	65	—	—	The Bradley Barn Sessions
1996	"Redneck Games"	Jeff Foxworthy	42		66	79	—	—	Crank It Up: The Music Album
2005	"You Ain't Just Whistlin' Dixie"	The Bellamy Brothers	—		—	—	—	—	Angels & Outlaws, Vol. 1
2006	"Barefootin'"	Jimmy Buffett	—		—	—	—	—	Hoot (soundtrack)
2010	"As She's Walking Away"	Zac Brown Band	1		32	—	64	—	You Get What You Give
2016	"Forever Country"	Artists of Then, Now & Forever	1	33	21	39	25	26	—N/a
"—" denotes releases that did not chart

=== Christmas singles ===
Year	Single	Peak chart positions	Album
Year	Single	US Country	Album
1991	"I Only Want You for Christmas"	41	Honky Tonk Christmas
1993	"Honky Tonk Christmas"	53	Honky Tonk Christmas
1996	"Rudolph the Red-Nosed Reindeer"	56	Star of Wonder: A Country Christmas Collection
1997	"A Holly Jolly Christmas"	51	Honky Tonk Christmas

== Other charted and certified songs ==
Year	Single	Peak chart positions		Certifications (sales threshold)	Album
Year	Single	US Country	CAN Country	Certifications (sales threshold)	Album
1993	"Tropical Depression"	75	—		A Lot About Livin' (And a Little 'Bout Love)
1993	"Tequila Sunrise"	64	—		Common Thread: The Songs of the Eagles
1995	"I Only Want You for Christmas" (re-entry)	48	—		Honky Tonk Christmas
1995	"Honky Tonk Christmas" (re-entry)	59	—		Honky Tonk Christmas
1998	"I Only Want You for Christmas" (re-entry)	48	—		Honky Tonk Christmas
1999	"She Just Started Liking Cheatin' Songs"	72	—		Under the Influence
1999	"My Own Kind of Hat"	71	—		Under the Influence
1999	"Margaritaville" (with Jimmy Buffett)	63	—		Under the Influence
2000	"Murder on Music Row" (with George Strait)	38	47		Latest Greatest Straitest Hits (George Strait album)
2000	"Margaritaville" (with Jimmy Buffett) (re-entry)	74	—		Under the Influence
2000	"Three Minute Positive Not Too Country Up-Tempo Love Song"	72	—		When Somebody Loves You
2002	"Designated Drinker" (with George Strait)	44	—	RIAA: Gold	Drive
2002	"Let It Be Christmas"	37	—		Let It Be Christmas
2002	"Jingle Bells"	58	—		Let It Be Christmas
2003	"Just Put a Ribbon in Your Hair"	51	—		A Very Special Acoustic Christmas
2015	"Angels and Alcohol"	49	—		Angels and Alcohol
2023	"It's Five O'Clock Somewhere" (with Jimmy Buffett; re-entry)	22	—		Greatest Hits Volume II
"—" denotes releases that did not chart

== Videography ==
=== Music videos ===
Year	Title	Director
1989	"Blue Blooded Woman"	Peter Lippman
1990	"Here in the Real World"	Jim May
1990	"Wanted"	Bing Sokolsky
1990	"Chasin' That Neon Rainbow"	Jack Cole
1991	"Don't Rock the Jukebox"	Julien Temple
1991	"Someday"	Mark Lindquist
1991	"I Only Want You for Christmas"	Jim May
1992	"Midnight in Montgomery"	Jim Shea
1992	"She's Got the Rhythm (And I Got the Blues)"	Jim Shea
1993	"Tonight I Climbed the Wall"	Jim Shea
1993	"Chattahoochee"	Martin Kahan
1993	"Mercury Blues"	Piers Plowden
1993	"The Angels Cried" (with Alison Krauss)	Tom Calabrese
1994	"(Who Says) You Can't Have It All"	Piers Plowden
1994	"Summertime Blues"	Michael Salomon
1994	"Livin' on Love"	Piers Plowden
1994	"Gone Country"	Michael Oblowitz
1995	"Song for the Life"	Piers Plowden
1995	"I Don't Even Know Your Name"	Piers Plowden
1995	"Tall, Tall Trees"	Sherman Halsey
1996	"Little Bitty"	Roger Pistole
1997	"Who's Cheatin' Who"	Brad Fuller
1998	"I'll Go On Loving You"	Steven Goldmann
1999	"Little Man"	Steven Goldmann
1999	"Pop a Top"	Steven Goldmann
2000	"www.memory"	Morgan Lawley
2001	"When Somebody Loves You"	chris rogers [sic]
2001	"It's Alright to Be a Redneck"	Steven Goldmann
2001	"Where Were You (When the World Stopped Turning)" (Live from the 2001 CMA Awards)	Paul Miller
2002	"Drive (For Daddy Gene)"	Steven Goldmann
2002	"Let It Be Christmas" (Live)	Alan Carter
2002	"That'd Be Alright"	Steven Goldmann
2003	"It's Five O'Clock Somewhere" (with Jimmy Buffett)	Trey Fanjoy
2003	"Remember When"	Trey Fanjoy
2004	"Too Much of a Good Thing"	David McClister
2004	"Monday Morning Church"	Kristin Barlowe
2005	"The Talkin' Song Repair Blues"	Margaret Malandruccolo
2006	"Are You Washed in the Blood/I'll Fly Away Medley"	James Burton Yockey
2006	"Like Red on a Rose"	Randee St. Nicholas
2007	"A Woman's Love"	Honey
2007	"Small Town Southern Man"	Roman White
2008	"Good Time"	Trey Fanjoy
2008	"Country Boy"	Scott Scovill
2009	"Sissy's Song"	Scott Scovill
2009	"I Still Like Bologna"	Scott Scovill
2010	"It's Just That Way"	Roman White
2010	"Hard Hat and a Hammer"	Theresa Wingert
2011	"Long Way to Go"	Steven Goldmann
2012	"So You Don't Have to Love Me Anymore"	Steven Goldmann
2013	"Blue Ridge Mountain Song"	David McClister
2013	"Blacktop"	David McClister
2015	"You Can Always Come Home"	
2017	"The Older I Get"	
2021	"Where Have You Gone"	Peter Zavadil

=== Guest appearances ===
Year	Title	Director
1992	"I Don't Need Your Rockin' Chair" (George Jones and Friends)	Marc Ball
1994	"A Good Year for the Roses" (with George Jones)	Gerry Wenner
1996	"Redneck Games" (with Jeff Foxworthy)	Coke Sams
2004	"Hey, Good Lookin'" (with Jimmy Buffett, Clint Black, Kenny Chesney, Toby Keith and George Strait)	Trey Fanjoy/Stan Kellam
2010	"As She's Walking Away" (with Zac Brown Band)	Darren Doane
2016	"Forever Country" (Artist of Then, Now & Forever)	Joseph Kahn
