= Genuine: The Alan Jackson Story =

Box set by Alan Jackson
- Released: November 6, 2015
- Recorded: 1989–2015
- Genre: Neotraditional country
- Length: 212:00
- Label: Arista; Legacy

Alan Jackson chronology
Angels and Alcohol (2015)	Genuine: The Alan Jackson Story (2015)	Precious Memories Collection (2015)

Professional ratings
Review scores
Source	Rating
AllMusic	5/5 stars
PopMatters	7/10 stars

Genuine: The Alan Jackson Story is a three-disc box set by American country music singer-songwriter Alan Jackson, released on November 6, 2015, by Arista Nashville and Legacy Recordings. It is the first career-spanning box set of Jackson's career and features many of his most popular songs, as well as eight previously unreleased recordings. Also included is a booklet with photographs of Jackson throughout his life and career, as well as a poster.

Of the 59 songs included, 38 were written or co-written by Jackson.

== Track listing ==
- All songs written by Alan Jackson, unless otherwise stated.
- ^{(Prev. unrel.)} = Previously unreleased.

=== Disc one ===
1. "Blue Blooded Woman" (Alan Jackson, Roger Murrah, Keith Stegall) – 2:14
2. "Here in the Real World" (Jackson, Mark Irwin) – 3:38
3. "Wanted" (Jackson, Charlie Craig) – 2:57
4. "Chasin' That Neon Rainbow" (Jackson, Jim McBride) – 3:05
5. "I'd Love You All Over Again" – 3:10
6. "Don't Rock the Jukebox (Jackson, Murrah, Stegall) – 2:51
7. "Someday" (Jackson, McBride) – 3:17
8. "Dallas" (Jackson, Stegall) – 2:44
9. "Midnight in Montgomery" (Jackson, Don Sampson) – 3:45
10. "Love's Got a Hold on You" (Stegall, Carson Chamberlain) – 2:53
11. "She's Got the Rhythm (And I Got the Blues)" (Jackson, Randy Travis) – 2:24
12. "Tonight I Climbed the Wall" – 3:30
13. "Chattahoochee" (Jackson, McBride) – 2:27
14. "Mercury Blues" (K. C. Douglas, Robert Geddins) – 3:38
15. "(Who Says) You Can't Have It All" (Jackson, McBride) – 3:29
16. "Summertime Blues" (Eddie Cochran, Jerry Capehart) – 3:12
17. "Gone Country" (Bob McDill) – 4:19
18. "Born Too Late" (Jackson, Travis) – 5:13 ^{(Prev. unrel.)}
19. "If Tears Could Talk" (Jackson, Travis) – 3:46 ^{(Prev. unrel.)}
20. "Seven Bridges Road" (live) (Steve Young) – 4:09 ^{(Prev. unrel.)}

=== Disc two ===
1. "Livin' on Love" – 3:48
2. "I Don't Even Know Your Name" (Jackson, Ron Jackson, Andy Loftin) – 3:50
3. "Tall, Tall Trees" (George Jones, Roger Miller) – 2:29
4. "I'll Try" – 3:52
5. "Home" – 3:18
6. "Little Bitty" (Tom T. Hall) – 2:38
7. "Who's Cheatin' Who" (Jerry Hayes) – 4:01
8. "There Goes" – 3:55
9. "Between the Devil and Me" (Chamberlain, Harley Allen) – 4:22
10. "A House with No Curtains" (Jackson, McBride) – 3:25
11. "I'll Go On Loving You" (Kieran Kane) – 3:57
12. "Right on the Money" (Charlie Black, Phil Vassar) – 3:49
13. "Gone Crazy" – 3:50
14. "Little Man" – 4:27
15. "Pop a Top" (Nat Stuckey) – 3:05
16. "The Blues Man" (Hank Williams Jr.) – 7:05
17. "It Must Be Love" (McDill) – 2:51
18. "Wings" – 4:28 ^{(Prev. unrel.)}
19. "Seguro Que Hell Yes" (Alex Harvey, Michael Blakey, John A. Martinez) – 4:17 ^{(Prev. unrel.)}
20. "The Star-Spangled Banner" (Francis Scott Key, John Stafford Smith) – 1:40 ^{(Prev. unrel.)}

=== Disc three ===
1. "Where I Come From" – 3:59
2. "When Somebody Loves You" – 3:27
3. "Where Were You (When the World Stopped Turning)" – 5:05
4. "Drive (For Daddy Gene)" – 4:02
5. "Work in Progress" – 4:07
6. "That'd Be Alright" (Tia Sillers, Tim Nichols, Mark D. Sanders) – 3:41
7. "It's Five O'Clock Somewhere" (duet with Jimmy Buffett) (Jim "Moose" Brown, Don Rollins) – 3:50
8. "Remember When" – 4:31
9. "Too Much of a Good Thing" – 3:08
10. "Monday Morning Church" (duet with Patty Loveless) (Brent Baxter, Erin Enderlin) – 3:21
11. "Like Red on a Rose" (Robert Lee Castleman, Melanie Castleman) – 3:32
12. "A Woman's Love" – 4:13
13. "Small Town Southern Man" – 4:40
14. "Good Time" – 5:06
15. "Country Boy" – 4:07
16. "Sissy's Song" – 3:02
17. "As She's Walking Away" (with Zac Brown Band) (Zac Brown, Wyatt Durrette) – 3:43
18. "Love Is Hard" – 2:56 ^{(Prev. unrel.)}
19. "Ain't Just a Southern Thing" – 3:40 ^{(Prev. unrel.)}

== Chart positions ==
Chart (2015)	Peak position
US Top Country Albums (Billboard)	19
