= The Very Best of Alan Jackson =

Greatest hits album by Alan Jackson
- Released: June 14, 2004
- Genre: Country
- Length: 69:52
- Label: BMG

Alan Jackson chronology
Greatest Hits Volume II (2003)	The Very Best of Alan Jackson (2004)	What I Do (2004)

Professional ratings
Review scores
Source	Rating
Allmusic	3/5 stars

The Very Best of Alan Jackson is the fourth greatest hits compilation album by American country artist Alan Jackson. It was released in the United States on June 14, 2004, on the Sony BMG International label.

== Content ==
The release includes 18 greatest hits from Alan Jackson's studio albums:

Here in the Real World (1990)

- "Here in the Real World"
- "Chasin' That Neon Rainbow"

Don't Rock the Jukebox (1991)

- "Don't Rock the Jukebox"
- "Midnight in Montgomery"

A Lot About Livin' (And a Little 'bout Love) (1992)

- "Chattahoochee"
- "She's Got the Rhythm (And I Got the Blues)"

Who I Am (1994)

- "Livin' on Love"
- "Gone Country"

Everything I Love (1996)

- "Little Bitty"
- "Everything I Love"
- "Who's Cheatin' Who"

High Mileage (1998)

- "Right on the Money"
- "Little Man"

Under the Influence (1999)

- "Pop a Top"
- "It Must Be Love"

When Somebody Loves You (2000)

- "www.memory"

Drive (2002)

- "Drive (For Daddy Gene)"
- "Where Were You (When the World Stopped Turning)"

and two hits from his compilation albums:

The Greatest Hits Collection (1995)

- "Tall, Tall Trees"

Greatest Hits Volume II... and Some Other Stuff (2003)

- "It's Five O'Clock Somewhere"

== Track listing ==
No.	Title	Writer(s)	Length
1.	"Gone Country"	Bob McDill	4:18
2.	"Drive (For Daddy Gene)"	Jackson	4:02
3.	"Where Were You (When the World Stopped Turning)"	Jackson	5:05
4.	"www.memory"	Jackson	2:35
5.	"It's Five O'Clock Somewhere"	Jim "Moose" Brown, Don Rollins	3:51
6.	"Chattahoochee" (extended mix)	Jackson, Jim McBride	3:58
7.	"She's Got the Rhythm (And I Got the Blues)"	Jackson, Randy Travis	2:25
8.	"Midnight in Montgomery"	Jackson, Don Sampson	3:45
9.	"Little Man"	Jackson	4:28
10.	"Pop a Top"	Nat Stuckey	3:05
11.	"Don't Rock the Jukebox"	Jackson, Roger Murrah, Keith Stegall	2:52
12.	"Little Bitty"	Tom T. Hall	2:39
13.	"Here in the Real World"	Mark Irwin, Jackson	3:38
14.	"Livin' on Love"	Jackson	3:49
15.	"Who's Cheatin' Who"	Jerry Hayes	4:02
16.	"Tall, Tall Trees"	George Jones, Roger Miller	2:28
17.	"Right on the Money"	Charlie Black, Phil Vassar	3:49
18.	"Chasin' That Neon Rainbow"	Jackson, McBride	3:06
19.	"It Must Be Love"	Bob McDill	2:51
20.	"Everything I Love"	Harley Allen, Carson Chamberlain	3:06
Total length:			69:52

== Charts and certifications ==
The Very Best of Alan Jackson debuted at #47 on the UK Albums Chart on week 27/2004, where it stayed for one week.

Chart (2004)	Peak position
UK Albums Chart	47

== Certifications ==
Region	Certification	Certified units/sales
Australia (ARIA)	Platinum	70,000^{^}
^{^} Shipments figures based on certification alone.
