= 34 Number Ones =

Greatest hits album by Alan Jackson
- Released: November 23, 2010
- Recorded: 1989–2010
- Genres: Country; neotraditional country
- Length: 132:48
- Label: Arista Nashville
- Producer: Keith Stegall

Alan Jackson chronology
Freight Train (2010)	34 Number Ones (2010)	Thirty Miles West (2012)

Singles from 34 Number Ones
- 1. "As She's Walking Away" Released: August 23, 2010; 2. "Ring of Fire" Released: December 6, 2010

Professional ratings
Review scores
Source	Rating
AllMusic	5/5 stars

34 Number Ones is the seventh greatest hits compilation album by American country artist Alan Jackson. It was released in the United States on November 23, 2010, through Arista Nashville. The release celebrates Jackson's 20-year anniversary of his debut album. As of the chart dated February 26, 2011, the album has sold 200,131 copies in the US.

== Content ==
The release includes all of Jackson's number-one hits on various trade charts, from his first, "Here in the Real World", to his (at the time) latest, "Country Boy". Newly included in the release are his cover of Johnny Cash's "Ring of Fire" and Jackson's late-2010 contribution with Zac Brown Band, "As She's Walking Away". "Look at Me", a song which was initially recorded for the soundtrack to Billy: The Early Years, was previously unreleased on a Jackson album.

== The Essential Alan Jackson ==
34 Number Ones was re-released and re-packaged on April 17, 2012, as The Essential Alan Jackson. Both albums have an identical track listing.

The Essential peaked at number 20 on the U.S. Billboard Top Country Albums chart. It also reached number 145 on the main Billboard albums chart.

== Track listing ==
CD 1 (1990–1995)
No.	Title	Writer(s)	Length
1.	"Ring of Fire"	June Carter, Merle Kilgore	3:11
2.	"Here in the Real World"	Mark Irwin, Alan Jackson	3:38
3.	"Wanted"	Charlie Craig, Jackson	2:56
4.	"Chasin' That Neon Rainbow"	Jackson, Jim McBride	3:05
5.	"I'd Love You All Over Again"	Jackson	3:10
6.	"Don't Rock the Jukebox"	Jackson, Roger Murrah, Keith Stegall	2:50
7.	"Someday"	Jackson, McBride	3:17
8.	"Dallas"	Jackson, Stegall	2:44
9.	"Midnight in Montgomery"	Jackson, Don Sampson	3:44
10.	"Love's Got a Hold on You"	Carson Chamberlain, Stegall	2:53
11.	"She's Got the Rhythm (And I Got the Blues)"	Jackson, Randy Travis	2:24
12.	"Tonight I Climbed the Wall"	Jackson	3:30
13.	"Chattahoochee"	Jackson, Jim McBride	2:27
14.	"(Who Says) You Can't Have It All"	Jackson, McBride	3:28
15.	"Summertime Blues"	Jerry Capehart, Eddie Cochran	3:11
16.	"Livin' on Love"	Jackson	3:48
17.	"Gone Country"	Bob McDill	4:19
18.	"I Don't Even Know Your Name"	Jackson, Ron Jackson, Andy Loftin	3:49
19.	"Tall, Tall Trees"	George Jones, Roger Miller	2:27

CD 2 (1996–2008)
No.	Title	Writer(s)	Length
1.	"As She's Walking Away" (Zac Brown Band featuring Alan Jackson)	Zac Brown, Wyatt Durrette	3:45
2.	"Look at Me"	Jim Collins, Paul Overstreet	3:16
3.	"I'll Try"	Jackson	3:51
4.	"Home"	Jackson	3:18
5.	"Little Bitty"	Tom T. Hall	2:38
6.	"Who's Cheatin' Who"	Jerry Hayes	4:01
7.	"There Goes"	Jackson	3:55
8.	"Between the Devil and Me"	Allen, Chamberlain	4:21
9.	"Right on the Money"	Charlie Black, Phil Vassar	3:49
10.	"It Must Be Love"	McDill	2:50
11.	"Where I Come From"	Jackson	3:59
12.	"Where Were You (When the World Stopped Turning)"	Jackson	5:04
13.	"Drive (For Daddy Gene)"	Jackson	4:01
14.	"It's Five O'Clock Somewhere" (Alan Jackson and Jimmy Buffett)	Jim "Moose" Brown, Don Rollins	3:49
15.	"Remember When"	Jackson	4:30
16.	"Small Town Southern Man"	Jackson	4:40
17.	"Good Time"	Jackson	5:07
18.	"Country Boy"	Jackson	4:06

== Personnel on new tracks ==
Adapted from liner notes.

- Eddie Bayers – drums on "Ring of Fire" & "Look at Me"
- Coy Bowles – Hammond B-3 organ on "As She's Walking Away"
- Zac Brown – acoustic guitar and lead vocals on "As She's Walking Away"
- Clay Cook – electric guitar and background vocals on "As She's Walking Away"
- Jimmy De Martini – fiddle and background vocals on "As She's Walking Away"
- Larry Franklin – fiddle on "Ring of Fire"
- Paul Franklin – steel guitar on "Ring of Fire"
- Chris Fryar – drums on "As She's Walking Away"
- John Driskell Hopkins – bass guitar and background vocals on "As She's Walking Away"
- Alan Jackson – lead vocals
- Brent Mason – acoustic guitar on "Look at Me", electric guitar on "Ring of Fire"
- Gary Prim – piano on "Ring of Fire" & "Look at Me"
- John Wesley Ryles – background vocals on "Ring of Fire"
- Jimmie Lee Sloas – bass guitar on "Look at Me"
- Rafe Van Hoy – acoustic guitar on "Look at Me"
- John Willis – acoustic guitar on "Ring of Fire"
- Lee Ann Womack – background vocals on "Ring of Fire"
- Glenn Worf – bass guitar on "Ring of Fire"

== Charts ==
=== Weekly charts ===
Chart (2010–2011)	Peak position
Australian Albums (ARIA)	7
US Billboard 200	37
US Top Country Albums (Billboard)	7

Chart (2020–2026)	Peak position
Canadian Albums (Billboard)	30

=== Year-end charts ===
Chart (2011)	Position
Australian Albums (ARIA)	95
US Billboard 200	128
US Top Country Albums (Billboard)	22

Chart (2020)	Position
US Top Country Albums (Billboard)	93

== Certifications ==
Region	Certification	Certified units/sales
Australia (ARIA)	Platinum	70,000^{^}
United Kingdom (BPI)	Silver	60,000^{‡}
United States (RIAA)	Gold	500,000^{^}
^{^} Shipments figures based on certification alone.^{‡} Sales+streaming figures based on certification alone.
