= Greatest Hits Volume II (Alan Jackson album) =

2003 compilation album by Alan Jackson

Greatest hits album by Alan Jackson
- Released: August 12, 2003
- Genre: Country
- Length: 96:46
- Label: Arista
- Producer: Keith Stegall

Alan Jackson chronology
Let It Be Christmas (2002)	Greatest Hits Volume II (2003)	The Very Best of Alan Jackson (2004)

Singles from Greatest Hits Volume II
- 1. "It's Five O'Clock Somewhere" Released: June 2, 2003; 2. "Remember When" Released: October 27, 2003

Professional ratings
Review scores
Source	Rating
About.com	(favorable)
Allmusic	4.5/5 stars
The Village Voice	(mixed)

Greatest Hits Volume II, also known as Greatest Hits Volume II... and Some Other Stuff is the third compilation album by American country music artist Alan Jackson. The original version of this album was only available through December, 2003 and contained two discs: the first disc has 16 hits and two new cuts, while the second disc has eight album tracks. Subsequent releases contained only the first disc.

== Track listing ==
=== Disc 1 ===
1. "Little Bitty" (Tom T. Hall) (1996) – 2:39
2. "Everything I Love" (Harley Allen, Carson Chamberlain) (1997) – 3:07
3. "Who's Cheatin' Who" (Jerry Hayes) (1997) – 4:02
4. "There Goes" (Alan Jackson) (1997) – 3:56
5. "I'll Go On Loving You" (Kieran Kane) (1998) – 3:58
6. "Right on the Money" (Charlie Black, Phil Vassar) (1998) – 3:50
7. "Gone Crazy" (Jackson) (1999) – 3:47
8. "Little Man" (Jackson) (1999) – 4:28
9. "Pop a Top" (Nat Stuckey) (1999) – 3:05
10. "The Blues Man" (Hank Williams Jr.) (2000) – 7:03
11. "It Must Be Love" (Bob McDill) (2000) – 2:52
12. "www.memory" (Jackson) (2000) – 2:35
13. "When Somebody Loves You" (Jackson) (2000) – 3:28
14. "Where I Come From" (Jackson) (2001) – 4:00
15. "Where Were You (When the World Stopped Turning)" (Jackson) (2001) – 5:05
16. "Drive (For Daddy Gene)" (Jackson) (2002) – 4:02
17. "It's Five O'Clock Somewhere" (Jim "Moose" Brown, Don Rollins) (2003) – 3:49
  - with Jimmy Buffett
18. "Remember When" (Jackson) (2003) – 4:30

=== Disc 2 ===
Versions of this album initially had this second disc included.

1. "Job Description" (Jackson) – 4:43
2. "Tropical Depression" (Charlie Craig, Jackson, Jim McBride) – 2:57
3. "Let's Get Back to Me and You" (Jackson) – 2:53
4. "You Can't Give Up on Love" (Jackson) – 3:06
5. "Hole in the Wall" (Jackson, McBride) – 3:35
6. "Buicks to the Moon" (Jackson, McBride) – 2:38
7. "When Love Comes Around" (Jackson) – 3:06
8. "The Sounds" (Jackson) – 3:23

== Personnel on New Tracks ==
- Eddie Bayers - drums
- Jimmy Buffett - duet vocals on "It's Five O'Clock Somewhere"
- Eric Darken - percussion on "It's Five O'Clock Somewhere"
- Stuart Duncan - fiddle on "It's Five O'Clock Somewhere", mandolin on "Remember When"
- Paul Franklin - steel guitar on "It's Five O'Clock Somewhere"
- Lloyd Green - steel guitar on "Remember When"
- Greenwood Hart - acoustic guitar on "Remember When"
- Alan Jackson - lead vocals
- Brent Mason - electric guitar
- Matthew McCauley - conductor and string arrangements on "Remember When"
- Hargus "Pig" Robbins - piano
- John Wesley Ryles - background vocals
- Bruce Watkins - acoustic guitar
- Glenn Worf - bass guitar

== Chart performance ==
Greatest Hits Volume II debuted at #1 on the U.S. Billboard 200 selling 417,000 copies, becoming Alan Jackson's second #1 album, and #1 on the Top Country Albums, becoming his eighth #1 country album. In May 2023, Greatest Hits Volume II was certified 7× Platinum by the RIAA.

=== Weekly charts ===
Chart (2003)	Peak position
Australian Albums (ARIA)	24
Canadian Albums (Billboard)	2
Norwegian Albums (VG-lista)	3
US Billboard 200	1
US Top Country Albums (Billboard)	1

=== Year-end charts ===
Chart (2003)	Position
US Billboard 200	46
US Top Country Albums (Billboard)	7
Worldwide Albums (IFPI)	31

Chart (2004)	Position
US Billboard 200	55
US Top Country Albums (Billboard)	6

Chart (2005)	Position
US Top Country Albums (Billboard)	40

Chart (2021)	Position
US Top Country Albums (Billboard)	67

== Certifications ==
Certifications for Greatest Hits, Vol. II
Region	Certification	Certified units/sales
Canada (Music Canada)	4× Platinum	400,000^{‡}
United States (RIAA)	7× Platinum	7,000,000^{‡}
^{‡} Sales+streaming figures based on certification alone.
