= Everything I Love (Alan Jackson album) =

Studio album by Alan Jackson
- Released: October 29, 1996
- Recorded: June–August 1996
- Studio: Cayman Moon Recorders, Berry Hill, TN; The Castle Recording Studio, Franklin, TN; Sound Stage Studio, Nashville, TN
- Genre: Neotraditional country
- Length: 34:25
- Label: Arista Nashville
- Producer: Keith Stegall

Alan Jackson chronology
The Greatest Hits Collection (1995)	Everything I Love (1996)	High Mileage (1998)

Singles from Everything I Love
- 1. "Little Bitty" Released: October 14, 1996; 2. "Everything I Love" Released: January 13, 1997; 3. "Who's Cheatin' Who" Released: April 7, 1997; 4. "There Goes" Released: July 7, 1997; 5. "Between the Devil and Me" Released: October 6, 1997; 6. "A House with No Curtains" Released: January 1998

Professional ratings
Review scores
Source	Rating
AllMusic	4/5 stars
Chicago Tribune	3/4 stars
Entertainment Weekly	A−
Q	3/5 stars
The Rolling Stone Album Guide	2.5/5 stars

Everything I Love is the sixth studio album by American country music artist Alan Jackson. It was released on October 29, 1996, and produced six singles for Jackson on the Hot Country Songs charts: the Number One hits "Little Bitty" and "There Goes", Top Ten hits in the title track, "Between the Devil and Me", and "Who's Cheatin' Who" (a cover of Charly McClain's #1 song from 1980), and the #18 "A House with No Curtains", his first single since 1989's "Blue Blooded Woman" to miss the Top Ten. It is the only album of Jackson's career to produce six singles.

== Track listing ==
No.	Title	Writer(s)	Length
1.	"Little Bitty"	Tom T. Hall	2:38
2.	"Everything I Love"	Harley Allen, Carson Chamberlain	3:06
3.	"Buicks to the Moon"	Alan Jackson, Jim McBride	2:36
4.	"Between the Devil and Me"	Allen, Chamberlain	4:21
5.	"There Goes"	Jackson	3:55
6.	"A House with No Curtains"	Jackson, McBride	3:25
7.	"Who's Cheatin' Who"	Jerry Hayes	4:01
8.	"Walk on the Rocks"	John E. Swaim	3:30
9.	"Must've Had a Ball"	Jackson	3:34
10.	"It's Time You Learned About Good-Bye"	Jackson	3:11

== Chart performance ==
Everything I Love peaked at #12 on the U.S. Billboard 200, and peaked at #1 on the Top Country Albums, his third #1 Country album. In August 2001, Everything I Love was certified 3 x platinum by the RIAA.

== Charts ==
=== Weekly charts ===
Chart (1996)	Peak position
Australian Albums (ARIA Charts)	76
Canadian Albums (RPM)	29
Canadian Country Albums (RPM)	1
US Billboard 200	12
US Top Country Albums (Billboard)	2

=== Year-end charts ===
Chart (1996)	Position
US Top Country Albums (Billboard)	53
Chart (1997)	Position
US Billboard 200	39
US Top Country Albums (Billboard)	7
Chart (1998)	Position
US Top Country Albums (Billboard)	29

== Certifications ==
Certifications for Everything I Love
Region	Certification	Certified units/sales
Australia (ARIA)	Gold	35,000^{^}
United States (RIAA)	3× Platinum	3,000,000^{^}
^{^} Shipments figures based on certification alone.

== Personnel ==
As listed in liner notes.

- Eddie Bayers − drums
- Ernie Collins − tuba and horn arrangement on "Must've Had A Ball"
- J. T. Corenflos − electric guitar
- Stuart Duncan − fiddle, mandolin
- Larry Franklin − fiddle
- Paul Franklin − steel guitar
- Barry Green − trombone on "Must've Had a Ball"
- Roy Huskey Jr. − upright bass
- Brent Mason − six-string bass guitar, electric guitar
- Dave Pomeroy − tic tac bass
- Gary Prim – piano
- Hargus "Pig" Robbins – piano
- John Wesley Ryles – backing vocals
- Dennis Sollee – clarinet on "Must've Had a Ball"
- Joe Spivey – fiddle
- Keith Stegall – banjo on "Must've Had a Ball"
- George Tidwell – trumpet on "Must've Had a Ball"
- Wayne Toups – accordion
- Bruce Watkins – acoustic guitar
- Lonnie Wilson – drums
- Glenn Worf – bass guitar
