= Baritone guitar =

Variation on the standard guitar

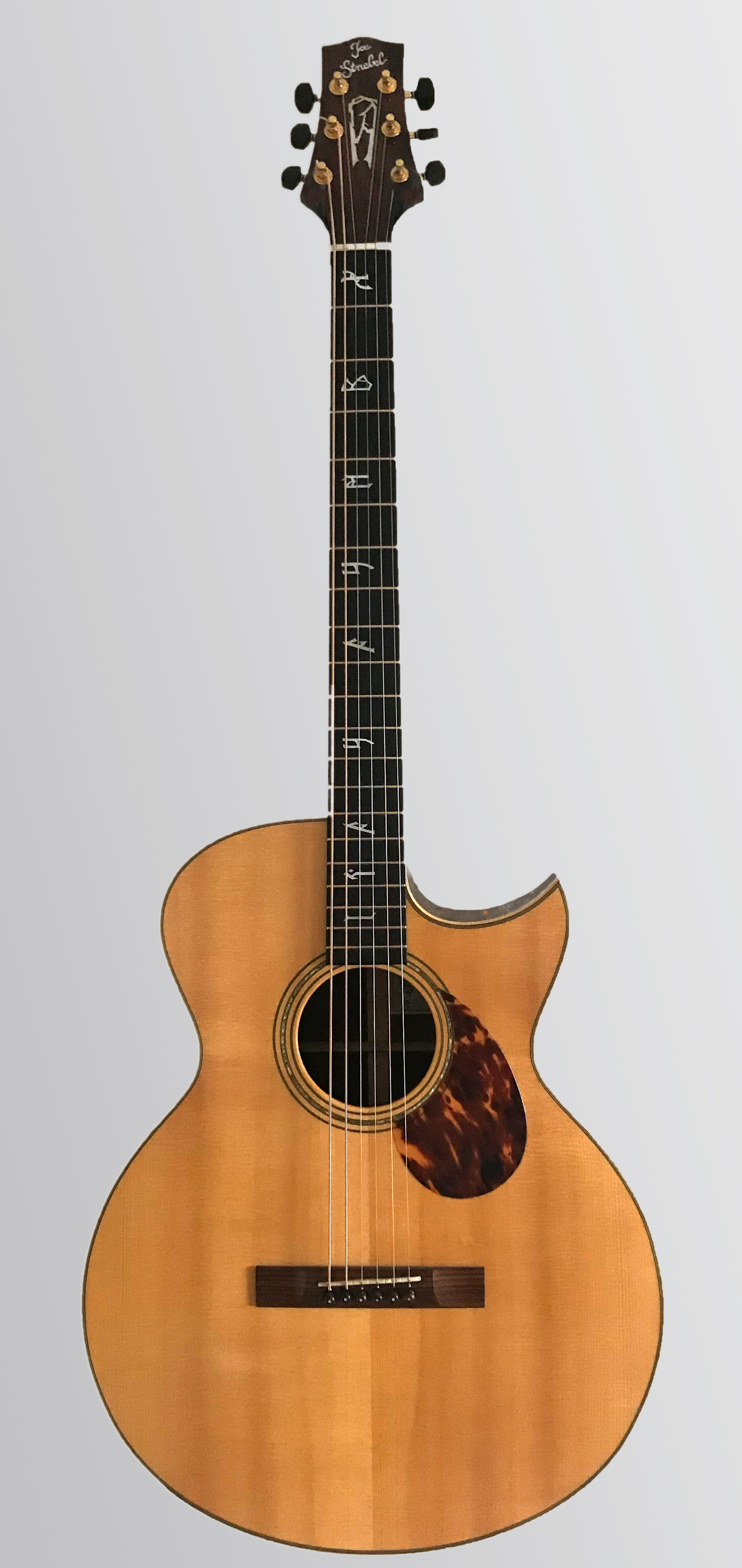
- A Peter Autschbach signature model acoustic baritone guitar

String instrument
- Classification: String instrument
- Hornbostel–Sachs classification: 321.322 (Composite chordophone)

Playing range
- (a standard tuned guitar)

Related instruments
- Bowed and plucked string instruments

The baritone guitar is a guitar with a longer scale length than standard, typically a larger body, and heavier internal bracing which allows tuning to a lower pitch.

The electric baritone guitar is a niche instrument with low popularity compared to other guitars, but is sometimes found in surf music; film scores, particularly spaghetti Westerns; some styles of heavy metal; and is dubbed "tic-tac bass" when used in country music to play in unison with a string bass or bass guitar.`

Gretsch, Fender, Gibson, Ibanez, ESP Guitars, PRS Guitars, Music Man, Danelectro, Schecter, Burns London and many other companies have produced electric baritone guitars since the 1960s, although always in small numbers compared to other guitars. Tacoma, Santa Cruz, Taylor, Martin, Alvarez Guitars, Ovation Guitar Company and others have made acoustic baritone guitars.

== Tuning and string gauges ==
The baritone-tuned guitar was uncommon until the Danelectro Company introduced an electric baritone guitar in 1956.

A regular guitar's standard tuning (from lowest–pitched string to highest) is E2–A2–D3–G3–B3–E4. While no standard tuning has been established for baritone guitars, popular tunings for the instrument are: a perfect fourth lower than a standard guitar (B1–E2–A2–D3–F♯3–B3), a perfect fifth lower (A1–D2–G2–C3–E3–A3), or a major third lower (C2–F2–B♭2–E♭3–G3–C4). Typically strung with 13 gauge (.013–.062), or 14 gauge (.014–.068) baritone guitar strings. 12 gauge (.012–.060) guitar strings can also be used.

Baritone acoustic guitars typically have larger bodies than standard guitars, and have longer scale lengths so the strings can be tuned lower while remaining at normal tension. On a standard guitar, the scale length (the distance from the nut to the saddle on the bridge) is typically 24.75 to 25.5 inches (629 to 648 mm). The most common scale lengths on a baritone range from 27 to 30.5 inches (690 to 770 mm).

== Baritone guitarists ==
=== Early adopters (1960s) ===
In the 1960s, it was often tuned an octave down from standard guitar tuning; therefore, these recordings used a retuned baritone guitar as a six-string bass. The Danelectro baritone was used by guitarist Duane Eddy in numerous recordings, including "Bonnie Came Back", "Because They're Young", "Kommotion", "My Blue Heaven", "Deep in the Heart of Texas", and "The Son of Rebel Rouser". The instrument was used almost exclusively on his best-selling 1960 album "The Twang's the Thang" and appears regularly on singles and albums throughout his career. The "twangy" sound of his guitars (which include Duane Eddy custom-builts by Guild, Gretsch and Gibson) augmented the even deeper twangy sound made by the Danelectro baritone. Eddy used the familiar black model and an unusual gray "Longhorn" model.

Brian Wilson occasionally included baritone guitars in his arrangements for The Beach Boys records, such as in "Don't Hurt My Little Sister" (recorded 1964 and released 1965; played by Ray Pohlman) and "Surf's Up" (recorded 1966 and 1971, released 1967; played by Al Casey).

Singer Jimmie Rodgers also favored the baritone guitar, which can be heard in the opening bars of his recording of "Woman from Liberia" (1960).

Singer Glen Campbell used a baritone electric guitar on several of his big hit songs, most notably "Wichita Lineman" and "Galveston", where he played a distinctive baritone solo following the melody in both songs.

=== In country music ===
Although they have never been as popular as their standard counterparts, baritone guitars have always had a presence in country music, often utilized for their deep, warm resonance:

- Sara Evans utilizes a baritone guitar in her song "Suds in the Bucket".
- Merle Haggard
- Chris Hillman, singer and guitarist for the Desert Rose Band plays one on the band's song "Desert Rose".
- Alan Jackson A baritone guitar can be heard playing the lead parts in the song "Life Keeps Bringing Me Down"
- Willie Nelson
- Brad Paisley can be heard playing one on the song "Whiskey Lullaby" with Alison Krauss
- Luther Perkins played a baritone guitar on several recordings for Johnny Cash
- Bobby Randall of Sawyer Brown has used a baritone guitar on several songs including the solo to their cover of "The Race Is On".
- Sturgill Simpson uses baritone guitar on the song "Brace for Impact (Live a Little)"
- Chris Stapleton utilizes the baritone guitar in his music, including on the album Traveller, in particular on the songs "Daddy Doesn't Pray Anymore" and "Parachute".
- Aaron Tippin plays a baritone guitar on his song "The Sound of Your Goodbye"
- Dwight Yoakam plays a baritone guitar on the song "Buenas Noches from a Lonely Room (She Wore Red Dresses)"

=== In heavy metal ===
Baritone guitars became popular in heavy metal music during the late 1980s, as it became increasingly popular to employ lower guitar tunings and dropped tunings. Early examples include Carcass (using B standard) and Bolt Thrower (using A standard on Realm of Chaos).

- Pat O'Brien formerly of the band Cannibal Corpse has a baritone guitar to allow him to use the tuning G♯ without experiencing tuning problems because of his use of a Floyd Rose tremolo.
- Dylan Carlson of drone metal band Earth played a baritone guitar on Hex (Or Printing in the Infernal Method).
- Machine Head uses baritone guitars tuned to drop B and C♯ standard (tuned 40 cents sharp (roughly A450)). Robb Flynn, singer and guitarist from the band, has a signature Epiphone Baritone Flying V model called "Love Death".
- Brian "Head" Welch of Korn uses Ibanez baritone guitars on his solo album Save Me From Myself.
- Dino Cazares of Fear Factory used both seven-string and eight-string Ibanez baritone guitars on Genexus.
- John Petrucci of the band Dream Theater has used Music Man baritone guitars on several songs, in the tunings A and B♭.
- James Hetfield of Metallica uses his signature ESP baritone guitar "The Grynch" on the song "Invisible Kid" from the 2003 Metallica album St. Anger, and occasionally uses it when the band plays songs from the album. Hetfield also used a Danelectro 58 Longhorn Baritone guitar on a blues arrangement of Metallica's "Fuel" first performed at a 2024 benefit concert for the All Within My Hands foundation.
- Claudio Sanchez of Coheed and Cambria uses a Gibson Explorer baritone for "Key Entity Extraction II: Hollywood The Cracked" from the band's album The Afterman: Ascension and "Key Entity Extraction V: Sentry The Defiant" from the album The Afterman: Descension.
- Devin Townsend of the Devin Townsend Project and Strapping Young Lad often uses baritone guitars due to his preference for open B and C tunings. His specific instruments are ESP Custom 7 string used in Strapping Young Lad, his Peavey signature Flying V, and the "Ziltoid" Flying V built by Framus.
- Stephen Carpenter of Deftones began using baritone 7-strings in 2002, due to his constant exploration in down-tuning. While previous albums were recorded with standard-scaled 6-strings tuned to as low as drop C, their 2003 self-titled album was recorded with a baritone 7-string tuned to G♯.
- Other baritone 7-string artists include Jeff Loomis of Nevermore, who has used baritone Schecters since 2002 and currently has several signature models. The deathcore band Whitechapel has recently made use of baritone guitars, and have released signature models with ESP that feature baritone scale lengths.
- Josh Middleton and Adam Christianson of progressive metalcore band Architects use baritone 6 string ESP, Ibanez, LSL and Mayones guitars, tuned to a variation of C♯ standard, where the bottom string is tuned to either G♯ or F♯. This tuning was first utilized by late guitarist and co-founder of the band, Tom Searle, with the G♯ tuning making its first appearance on the 2009 album Hollow Crown, and the F♯ tuning first appearing on the 2014 album Lost Forever // Lost Together. Both tunings are still used by the band in their newer music.
- Tracy G Used a custom-made baritone guitar on Dio's 1996 release Angry Machines. He continues to use the baritone guitar on all his releases.
- Roman Ibramkhalilov of Jinjer use custom OD baritone guitars since 2015, with the album "King of Everything" and in their most famous track and internet react phenomenon, "Pisces".
- Erik Bickerstaffe of Experimental Metalcore band Loathe uses a Gretsch G5260 Baritone guitar and Squier Vintage Modified Baritone Jazzmaster tuned to an octave below E standard

=== In other rock music ===
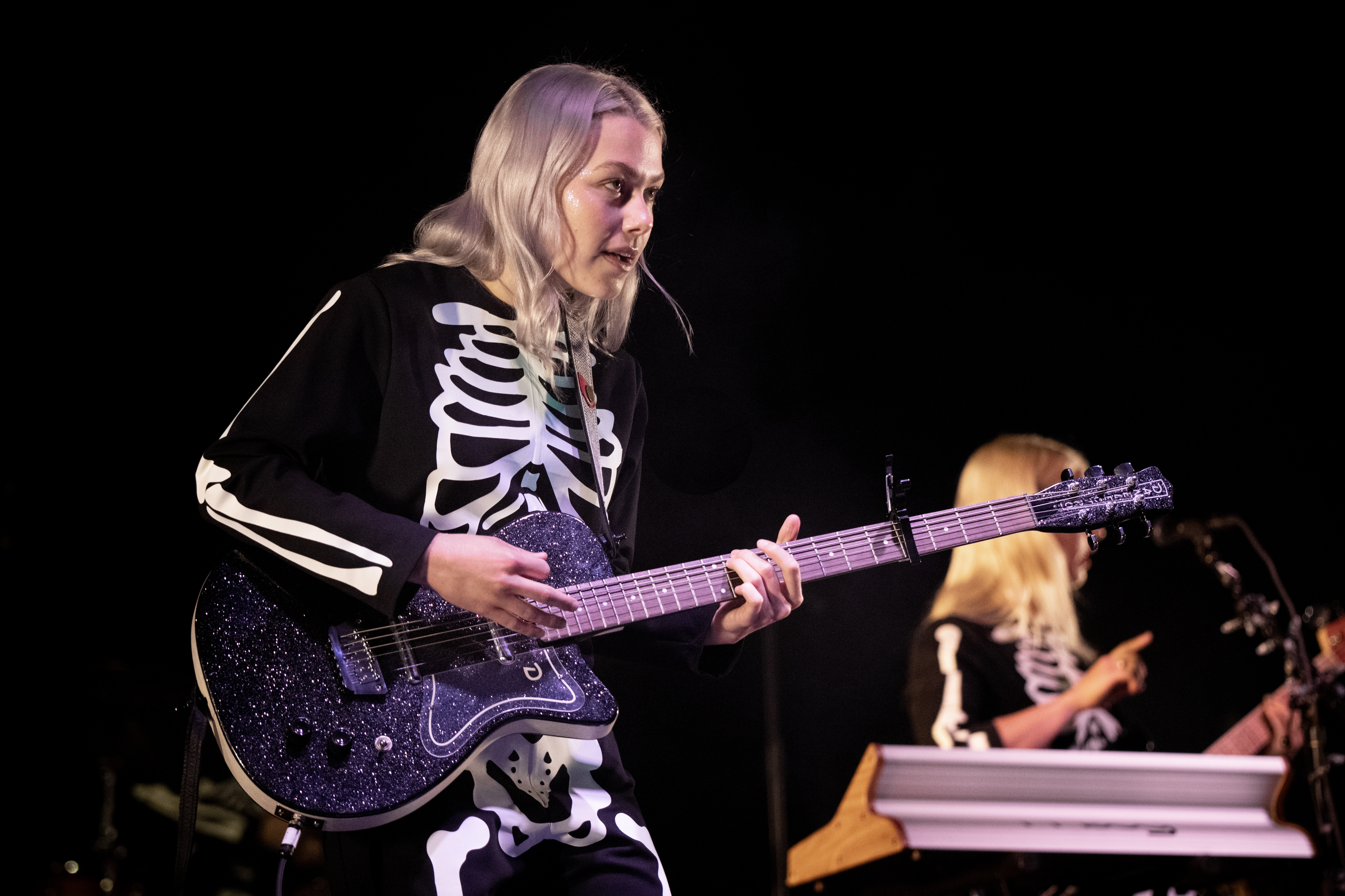
Phoebe Bridgers playing a Danelectro baritone guitar in 2021

Rock guitarists also use baritone guitars. Benjamin Burnley, the guitarist/singer from Breaking Benjamin, uses custom-built PRS and ESP baritone guitars for their songs in Drop A♯ tuning. Ko Melina of The Dirtbombs plays a Fender Jaguar Baritone Custom. Teppei Teranishi of Thrice plays a baritone on the "Fire" disc of The Alchemy Index and Major/Minor. Ian Mackaye plays a baritone guitar when playing with his band The Evens. Aerosmith's Joe Perry plays a six-string Fender VI bass tuned in G (which was later stolen) on "Back in the Saddle" on the 1976 Rocks album, and currently uses a Music Man Silo Baritone.

Eddie Van Halen used a baritone guitar on the songs "Spanked" And "Runaround" from Van Halen's 1991 album For Unlawful Carnal Knowledge. His specific guitar was a double-necked Ernie Ball EVH Music Man (the top neck being the baritone), which can be seen in music videos and live performances.

Pete Loeffler, the guitarist/singer from Chevelle, uses a custom built PRS baritone and Fender Sub-Sonic baritone guitar for their songs in drop B tuning.

Mike Mushok of the band Staind has a signature model baritone guitar manufactured by PRS Guitars. Prior to his PRS signature model, Mushok had a signature baritone guitar produced by Ibanez called the MMM1, and had a custom built fanned-fret baritone made by Novax called the Expression.

Dave Matthews plays a baritone on certain songs such as "The Space Between" and "Some Devil". Parker Lauzon of Evans Blue uses an Ibanez.

Irish blues rock artist Hozier utilizes a baritone guitar on the song 'Jackie and Wilson' and has used one in some live performances of his hit single 'Take Me To Church'.

Alex Turner, Nick O'Malley and Jamie Cook of the band Arctic Monkeys have used baritone guitar on the songs 'Star Treatment', 'Science Fiction' and 'Batphone' from the band's sixth album Tranquility Base Hotel & Casino respectively.

Pat Smear has played baritone guitar with the Foo Fighters on their album Wasting Light.

Andy Moor and Terrie Hessels of The Ex have traded off between baritone guitar and guitar since 2005, when the last bass player left their band.

Emma Ruth Rundle uses a Fender Jaguar Baritone.

Blink-182 guitarist and vocalist Tom DeLonge has occasionally used the baritone guitar for darker tones. Two notable examples are the band's songs "Adam's Song" from Enema of the State (1999), and "Obvious" from Blink-182 (2003).

Jesse Hughes of Eagles of Death Metal opted for a baritone guitar on many of the songs on their 2015 album Zipper Down.

Brian Jones played a baritone guitar on the riff in the Rolling Stones's 1964 song "Heart of Stone".

Bucky Pizzarelli played a 6 string Danelectro baritone with Billy Mure on the 1957 Album Supersonic Guitars.

Spider Murphy Gang lead singer Günther Sigl plays a baritone guitar through many of his solo concerts.

Daniela Villarreal played a Fender baritone guitar in drop A in The Warning's 2024 song "Automatic Sun ".

Caleb Bird of the two piece band Tweak Bird from Los Angeles exclusively uses a baritone guitar.

Geordie Greep, former vocalist and guitarist of Black Midi, used a Reverend Descent RA baritone guitar during his tenure with the group.

=== In jazz ===
Jazz guitarist Pat Metheny used baritone guitars made by Linda Manzer on his 2003 solo album One Quiet Night, his 2011 solo album What's It All About and his 2024 album MoonDial. Ani DiFranco often plays a baritone guitar, including those by Alvarez, frequently employing alternate tunings. Clifton Hyde has had his acoustic baritone guitar featured in the music of Sigur Rós, Gato Loco, and Pape Armond Boye. Bob Lanzetti, guitarist for the modern fusion band Snarky Puppy, frequently employs an electric baritone guitar as well. Allan Holdsworth used baritone guitars built by luthier Bill DeLap.

Mark Lettieri, solo artist and guitarist with Snarky Puppy, released two funk/fusion albums centered around the baritone guitar: Deep: The Baritone Sessions and Deep: The Baritone Sessions, Vol. 2 in 2019 and 2021, respectively, the latter of which also received a Grammy nomination for Best Contemporary Instrumental Album at the 2022 Grammy Awards. Lettieri also utilizes a baritone guitar with Vulfpeck side project, The Fearless Flyers.

=== Fingerstyle players and others ===
Numerous fingerstyle guitarists use baritone guitars, including Andy McKee, Don Ross, Martin Simpson, Sergio Altamura, Iain Micah Weigert, and Dave Amato. Don Ross plays a baritone by Canadian Luthier Marc Beneteau, and Simpson has played baritones made by English luthier Ralph Bown. Andy McKee plays a baritone guitar made by another Canadian Luthier Michael Greenfield. Brian Setzer played the Gretsch/TV Jones Spectra-Sonic baritone on the song "Mystery Train" during the Brian Setzer Orchestra tour.

Blues band MonkeyJunk features a baritone guitar instead of a bass guitar.

Australian musician Stu Thomas plays a Barracuda baritone guitar by Burns London, tuned an octave lower than a regular guitar. He uses it as a bass when playing with Dave Graney & The mistLY, and as a "regular" guitar when he accompanies himself solo as The Stu Thomas Paradox.

Dave Gonzalez started playing a baritone with The Hacienda Brothers, consisting of a Fender Bass VI neck on a Fender Jazzmaster.

YouTube guitarist Sungha Jung plays original and cover instrumentals on Lakewood Acoustic Baritone Guitars.

Guitarist Brian Patrick Carroll aka Buckethead played a baritone signature model Gibson Les Paul.

Phoebe Bridgers plays a Danelectro baritone model.

Producer and multi-instrumentalist Bibio has utilized baritone guitars.

A most notable collaboration with Ed Sheeran and PRS (2025-2026) have resulted in a number of artistic inspired colour schemes PRS SE Hollowbody Baritone guitars including a limited edition Cosmic Splash painted version.

== See also ==
- Bass guitar
- Chiterra sarda
- Eight-string guitar
- Extended-range bass
- Seven-string guitar
- Tenor guitar
