= Everything I Love (Alan Jackson song) =

Single by Alan Jackson

from the album Everything I Love
- B-side: "It's Time You Learned About Good-Bye"
- Released: January 13, 1997
- Genre: Country
- Length: 3:06
- Label: Arista Nashville
- Songwriters: Harley Allen; Carson Chamberlain
- Producer: Keith Stegall

Alan Jackson singles chronology
"Little Bitty" (1996)	"Everything I Love" (1997)	"Who's Cheatin' Who" (1997)

"Everything I Love" is a song written by Harley Allen and Carson Chamberlain, and recorded by American country music singer Alan Jackson. It was released in January 1997 as the second single and title track from his album of the same name. The song reached number 9 on the U.S. country singles charts.

== Content ==
"Everything I Love" is a mid-tempo ballad where the narrator lists off various vices that are harmful to him, such as "cigarettes, Jack Daniels and caffeine." He then adds his former lover to the list, before saying "Everything I love / I'm gonna have to give up / 'Cause everything I love is killin' me." The song was written by Harley Allen and Carson Chamberlain, who also wrote "Between the Devil and Me", the album's fifth single.

== Critical reception ==
In his review of Everything I Love, Allmusic critic Stephen Thomas Erlewine cited the track as a standout, saying that it had a "wry sardonic streak" and "classic country sentiment."

== Chart performance ==
"Everything I Love" debuted at number 73 on the U.S. Billboard Hot Country Singles & Tracks for the week of January 18, 1997.

Chart (1997)	Peak position
Canada Country Singles (RPM)	6
US Hot Country Songs (Billboard)	9

=== Year-end charts ===
Chart (1997)	Position
Canada Country Tracks (RPM)	61
US Country Songs (Billboard)	71
