= Let It Be Christmas =

Studio album (Christmas) by Alan Jackson
- Released: October 22, 2002
- Genres: Christmas; country
- Length: 35:40
- Label: Arista Nashville
- Producer: Keith Stegall

Alan Jackson chronology
Drive (2002)	Let It Be Christmas (2002)	Greatest Hits Volume II (2003)

Professional ratings
Review scores
Source	Rating
About.com	(favorable)
AllMusic	3.5/5 stars
Country Weekly	(favorable)
Entertainment Weekly	B−
Rolling Stone	(favorable)

Let It Be Christmas is the eleventh studio album and the second Christmas album by American country music artist Alan Jackson. Unlike his first album of Christmas music (1993's Honky Tonk Christmas), this one is composed mainly of renditions of traditional Christmas music. It was released on October 22, 2002, by Arista Nashville. The title track, one of two Christmas songs composed by Jackson, was a top 40 hit for Jackson on the Hot Country Songs chart.

== Track listing ==
No.	Title	Writer(s)	Length
1.	"Have Yourself a Merry Little Christmas"	Ralph Blane; Hugh Martin	2:58
2.	"Winter Wonderland"	Felix Bernard; Richard Bernhard Smith	2:18
3.	"O Come, All Ye Faithful"	Frederick Oakeley; John Francis Wade	3:18
4.	"Santa Claus Is Coming to Town"	J. Fred Coots; Haven Gillespie	2:42
5.	"The Christmas Song"	Mel Tormé; Robert Wells	3:52
6.	"Silent Night"	Franz Gruber; Joseph Mohr	3:47
7.	"Let It Be Christmas"	Alan Jackson	4:11
8.	"Jingle Bells"	James Lord Pierpont	2:50
9.	"White Christmas"	Irving Berlin	3:19
10.	"Silver Bells"	Ray Evans; Jay Livingston	3:36
11.	"Away in a Manger"	James Ramsey Murray; John Thomas McFarland	2:49
Total length:			35:40

== Personnel ==
- Eddie Bayers - drums
- Bill Elliott - conductor, horn arrangements, string arrangements, vocal arrangements
- Mark Fain - acoustic guitar
- Erica Goodman - harp
- Lloyd Green - pedal steel guitar
- Karen Harper - background vocals
- Alan Jackson - lead vocals
- The Kid Connection - background vocals
- Matthew McCauley - conductor, string arrangements
- Brent Mason - electric guitar
- Cassie Miller - background vocals
- Bobbi Page - background vocals
- Matt Rollings - piano
- Bruce Watkins - acoustic guitar
- Glenn Worf - bass guitar

== Chart performance ==
Let It Be Christmas peaked at No. 27 on the U.S. Billboard 200 and No. 6 on the Top Country Albums chart. In January 2003, it was certified Gold by the RIAA. It was later certified Platinum in 2026.

=== Weekly charts ===
Chart (2002)	Peak position
US Billboard 200	27
US Top Christian Albums (Billboard)	3
US Top Country Albums (Billboard)	6
US Top Holiday Albums (Billboard)	2

=== Year-end charts ===
Chart (2002)	Position
Canadian Country Albums (Nielsen SoundScan)	22

Chart (2003)	Position
US Billboard 200	178
US Top Country Albums (Billboard)	23

Chart (2018)	Position
US Top Country Albums (Billboard)	92

== Certifications ==
Certifications for Let It Be Christmas
Region	Certification	Certified units/sales
United States (RIAA)	Platinum	1,000,000^{‡}
^{‡} Sales+streaming figures based on certification alone.
