= Pretty Lady (Keith Stegall song) =

Single by Keith Stegall

from the album Keith Stegall
- B-side: "These Tears"
- Released: May 1985
- Genre: Country
- Length: 3:27
- Label: Epic
- Songwriter(s): Keith Stegall
- Producer(s): Kyle Lehning

Keith Stegall singles chronology
"California" (1985)	"Pretty Lady" (1985)	"Feed the Fire" (1985)

"Pretty Lady" is a song written and recorded by American country music artist Keith Stegall. It was released in May 1985 as the fourth single from his self-titled debut album. The song peaked at number 10 on the Billboard Hot Country Singles chart. It also reached number 12 on the RPM Country Tracks chart in Canada.

== Chart performance ==
Chart (1985)	Peak position
US Hot Country Songs (Billboard)	10
Canadian RPM Country Tracks	12
