= Angels and Alcohol =

Studio album by Alan Jackson
- Released: July 17, 2015
- Genre: Country; neotraditional country
- Length: 38:44
- Label: Alan's Country Records; EMI Nashville
- Producer: Keith Stegall

Alan Jackson chronology
The Bluegrass Album (2013)	Angels and Alcohol (2015)	Genuine: The Alan Jackson Story (2015)

Singles from Angels and Alcohol
- 1. "Jim and Jack and Hank" Released: July 6, 2015; 2. "The One You're Waiting On" Released: May 6, 2016

Professional ratings
Review scores
Source	Rating
AllMusic	4/5 stars

Angels and Alcohol is the twentieth studio album by American country music artist Alan Jackson. It was released on July 17, 2015, via Alan's Country Records and EMI Nashville. Jackson wrote seven of the album's ten tracks. The album was produced by Keith Stegall.

== Critical reception ==
The album has received mixed reviews from critics. Stephen Thomas Erlewine of AllMusic gave the album 4 out of 5 stars, writing that "Alan manages to not sound complacent on Angels and Alcohol because like all great country singers -- and he long ago established that he belongs in the pantheon of great country singers -- he thrives on the little telling details, whether they reside within a lyric or the freshening of a familiar three-chord turnaround.

== Track listing ==
All songs written by Alan Jackson except where noted.

No.	Title	Writer(s)	Length
1.	"You Can Always Come Home"		5:13
2.	"You Never Know"		3:34
3.	"Angels and Alcohol"		3:33
4.	"Gone Before You Met Me"	Michael White, Michael P. Heeney	3:25
5.	"The One You're Waiting On"	Adam Wright, Shannon Wright	4:13
6.	"Jim and Jack and Hank"		4:38
7.	"I Leave a Light On"		3:17
8.	"Flaws"		4:17
9.	"When God Paints"	Troy Jones, Greg Becker	3:09
10.	"Mexico, Tequila and Me"		3:25

== Personnel ==
- J.T. Corenflos - acoustic guitar, electric guitar
- Stuart Duncan - fiddle, mandolin
- Robbie Flint - slide guitar
- Larry Franklin - fiddle
- Paul Franklin - steel guitar
- Tania Hancheroff - background vocals
- Tommy Harden - drums
- Greenwood Hart - acoustic guitar, hand drum, piano
- Hoot Hester - fiddle
- Jim Hoke - accordion, harmonica
- Alan Jackson - lead vocals
- Andy Leftwich - fiddle, mandolin
- Brent Mason - acoustic guitar, electric guitar, gut string guitar
- Gary Prim - Hammond B-3 organ, piano
- John Wesley Ryles - background vocals
- Michael Severs - dobro
- Jimmie Lee Sloas - bass guitar
- Bobby Terry - banjo, acoustic guitar
- Jim Vest - steel guitar

== Charts ==
The album debuted on the Billboard 200 at No. 5, and on the Top Country Albums chart at No. 2, selling 46,000 copies in its debut week. As of December 2015, the album has sold 135,500 copies in the US.

=== Album ===
==== Weekly charts ====
Chart (2015)	Peak position
Australian Albums (ARIA)	4
Canadian Albums (Billboard)	4
Dutch Albums (Album Top 100)	68
Irish Albums (IRMA)	100
Norwegian Albums (VG-lista)	38
Scottish Albums (OCC)	54
UK Albums (OCC)	85
UK Country Albums (OCC)	1
UK Independent Albums (OCC)	8
US Billboard 200	5
US Top Country Albums (Billboard)	1

==== Year-end charts ====
Chart (2015)	Position
Australian Albums (ARIA)	86
US Top Country Albums (Billboard)	32
