= Between the Devil and Me =

Single by Alan Jackson

from the album Everything I Love
- B-side: "Walk on the Rocks"
- Released: October 6, 1997
- Genre: Country
- Length: 4:21
- Label: Arista Nashville 13106
- Songwriters: Harley Allen; Carson Chamberlain
- Producer: Keith Stegall

Alan Jackson singles chronology
"There Goes" (1997)	"Between the Devil and Me" (1997)	"A House with No Curtains" (1998)

"Between the Devil and Me" is a song written by Harley Allen and Carson Chamberlain, and recorded by American country music singer Alan Jackson. It was released in October 1997 as the fifth single from his album Everything I Love. It peaked at number two on the U.S. Billboard country singles charts, behind Martina McBride's "A Broken Wing".

== Content ==
"Between the Devil and Me" was written by Harley Allen and Carson Chamberlain, the same two songwriters who wrote the title track to Everything I Love. The song is a mid-tempo ballad in which the male narrator describes the sexual temptation of an extramarital affair, by saying that "she's all I see / Between the devil and me."

== Critical reception ==
Stephen Thomas Erlewine of Allmusic said that although the song had "a bit of post-Garth bombast" and "touches on the anthemic sounds of modern country", it still had Jackson's "true country spin and heart." Entertainment Weekly critic Alanna Nash also cited the song as a standout, saying that Jackson made the song "throb with anxiety."

== Chart performance ==
Chart (1997–1998)	Peak position
Canada Country Singles (RPM)	3
US Hot Country Songs (Billboard)	2

=== Year-end charts ===
Chart (1998)	Position
Canada Country Tracks (RPM)	40
US Country Songs (Billboard)	66
