= A House with No Curtains =

Single by Alan Jackson

from the album Everything I Love
- Released: January 1998
- Genre: Country
- Length: 3:25
- Label: Arista Nashville
- Songwriters: Alan Jackson; Jim McBride
- Producer: Keith Stegall

Alan Jackson singles chronology
"Between the Devil and Me" (1997)	"A House with No Curtains" (1998)	"I'll Go On Loving You" (1998)

"A House with No Curtains" is a song co-written and recorded by American country music singer Alan Jackson. It was released in January 1998 as the sixth and final single from his album Everything I Love. The song had previously been the B-side to the album's fourth single "There Goes". Jackson wrote the song with Jim McBride. It peaked at #18 on Billboard's Hot Country Tracks chart, breaking a streak of 27 consecutive singles by Jackson that had peaked in the top 10 of that chart.

== Content ==
The song is about a couple that stays together even though they are not happy. They still pretend that they are doing fine together for others to see, but everyone knows that it isn't working out between them.

== Critical reception ==
Stephen Thomas Erlewine, in his review of the album, called the song "a classic honky tonk ballad[...]worthy of early George Jones". An uncredited review from Billboard called the song "a gem of a country-gothic composition."

== Chart performance ==
"A House with No Curtains" spent fifteen weeks on the Hot Country Songs chart and peaked at number 18.

Chart (1998)	Peak position
Canada Country Singles (RPM)	14
US Hot Country Songs (Billboard)	18
