= Love's Got a Hold on You =

Single by Alan Jackson

from the album Don't Rock The Jukebox
- B-side: "That's All I Need to Know"
- Released: July 13, 1992
- Recorded: January 4, 1991
- Genre: Country
- Length: 2:54
- Label: Arista Records 07822-12447-7
- Songwriters: Carson Chamberlain; Keith Stegall
- Producers: Scott Hendricks; Keith Stegall

Alan Jackson singles chronology
"Midnight in Montgomery" (1992)	"Love's Got a Hold on You" (1992)	"She's Got the Rhythm (And I Got the Blues)" (1992)

"Love's Got a Hold on You" is a song written by Carson Chamberlain and Keith Stegall, and recorded by American country music artist Alan Jackson. It was released in July 1992 as the final single from Jackson's second album, Don't Rock the Jukebox. It was also the only song that Jackson did not co-write on the album, and the first single of such in his career. It peaked at number 1 on both the U.S. Billboard country music chart, and on the Canadian RPM country music chart.

== Content ==
The narrator is falling in love and doesn't know why he is acting differently. He asks the doctor and then his friends, they all say that it sounds like he is falling in love.

== Critical reception ==
Deborah Evans Price, of Billboard magazine reviewed the song favorably, saying that "love has him in a lassoed condition." She goes on to say that Jackson's "rich vocal romping hooks this catchy twirl." The production was described as "big-sounding" and that it adds "just the right snap." Ben Foster of Country Universe gave the song an A grade," saying that "the light jaunty arrangement creates just the right mood for the silly lyrics, while Jackson’s laid-back delivery fits the song like a glove. The result is that Jackson creates an infectious singalong-friendly earworm out of a song that could have been a grating annoyance in the wrong hands."

== Peak chart positions ==
"Love's Got a Hold on You" debuted at number 52 on the U.S. Billboard Hot Country Singles & Tracks for the week of July 25, 1992.

Chart (1992)	Peak position
Canada Country Singles (RPM)	1
US Hot Country Songs (Billboard)	1

=== Year-end charts ===
Chart (1992)	Position
Canada Country Tracks (RPM)	4
US Country Songs (Billboard)	12
