= I'll Go On Loving You =

Single by Alan Jackson

from the album High Mileage
- B-side: "Chattahoochee"
- Released: July 27, 1998
- Genre: Country
- Length: 3:58
- Label: Arista Nashville 13135
- Songwriter: Kieran Kane
- Producer: Keith Stegall

Alan Jackson singles chronology
"A House with No Curtains" (1998)	"I'll Go On Loving You" (1998)	"Right on the Money" (1998)

"I'll Go On Loving You" is a song written by Kieran Kane, and recorded by American country music artist Alan Jackson. It was released in July 1998 as the lead-off single from his album High Mileage. It peaked at number 3 in the United States, and number 2 in Canada. Jackson also recorded a dual-language English/Portuguese version with música sertaneja artist Leonardo of Leandro e Leonardo in 1999.

== Content ==
The song is a mid-tempo ballad in the key of C minor with alternating chord patterns of Cm-A♭ and Cm-B♭. Through the spoken-word verses, Jackson promises that he will be faithful to his lover, "long after the pleasures of the flesh". The song is accompanied mainly by steel-string acoustic guitar and a string section.

== Music video ==
The music video was directed by Steven Goldmann. Filmed in sepia tone, it shows Jackson and a string band performing the song during a water ballet performance. Jackson disappears in the end.

== Critical reception ==
Alanna Nash of Entertainment Weekly said that the song was "the frankest treatment of lust on country radio", "a colossal embarrassment" and "a memorable romantic declaration."

== Chart performance ==
"I'll Go On Loving You" debuted at number 35 on the Billboard country singles charts in late 1998, representing Jackson's highest chart debut at the time.

Chart (1998)	Peak position
Canada Country Singles (RPM)	2
US Hot Country Songs (Billboard)	3

=== Year-end charts ===
Chart (1998)	Position
Canada Country Tracks (RPM)	52
US Country Songs (Billboard)	38
