= (Who Says) You Can't Have It All =

Single by Alan Jackson

from the album A Lot About Livin' (And a Little 'bout Love)
- B-side: "If It Ain't One Thing (It's You)"
- Released: January 24, 1994
- Recorded: May 27, 1992
- Genre: Country
- Length: 3:28
- Label: Arista 12649
- Songwriters: Alan Jackson; Jim McBride
- Producer: Keith Stegall

Alan Jackson singles chronology
"Mercury Blues" (1993)	"(Who Says) You Can't Have It All" (1994)	"Summertime Blues" (1994)

"(Who Says) You Can't Have It All" is a song co-written and recorded by American country music artist Alan Jackson. It was released in January 1994 as the fifth and final single from his album A Lot About Livin' (And a Little 'bout Love). The song peaked at number 4 on the U.S. Billboard Hot Country Singles chart and number 11 on the Canadian RPM Country Tracks chart. Jackson wrote the song with Jim McBride.

== Content ==
The song is about a man who lost his woman. The narrator tells of the lonely scene of his bedroom alone. "A stark naked light bulb hangs over my head, There's one lonely pillow on my double bed." According to Jackson, it's one of his favorite songs he's written.

== Critical reception ==
Deborah Evans Price, of Billboard magazine reviewed the song favorably, calling it a "heartbreak, pure country waltz" and saying that nobody does this type of song better than Jackson. Kevin John Coyne of Country Universe gave the song an A grade, calling it a "pure country song" due to the fiddle. He goes on to say that Jackson's "equally forlorn voice singing the opening lyrics, 'A stark naked light bulb hangs over my head, there's one lonely pillow on my double bed', serves as confirmation that we're in for 3 minutes and 30 seconds of a deliciously straight-up country weeper that turns out to be one of Jackson's most satisfying singles yet.

== Music video ==
The music video was directed by Piers Plowden and premiered in early 1994.

== Chart positions ==
"(Who Says)" You Can't Have It All" debuted at number 43 on the U.S. Billboard Hot Country Singles & Tracks for the week of January 29, 1994.

Chart (1994)	Peak position
Canada Country Singles (RPM)	12
US Hot Country Songs (Billboard)	4

=== Year-end charts ===
Chart (1994)	Position
US Country Songs (Billboard)	68
