= Pop a Top =

1967 single by Jim Ed Brown

Single by Jim Ed Brown

from the album Just Jim
- B-side: "Too Good to Be True"
- Released: May 1967
- Genre: Country
- Length: 2:20
- Label: RCA Victor
- Songwriter: Nat Stuckey
- Producer: Felton Jarvis

Jim Ed Brown singles chronology
| "You Can Have Her" (1967) | "Pop a Top" (1967) | "Bottle, Bottle" (1967) |

"Pop a Top"

Single by Alan Jackson

from the album Under the Influence
- B-side: "Revenooer Man"
- Released: October 4, 1999
- Recorded: 1999
- Genre: Country, Western swing
- Length: 3:04
- Label: Arista Nashville 13183
- Songwriter: Nat Stuckey
- Producer: Keith Stegall

Alan Jackson singles chronology
| "Little Man" (1999) | "Pop a Top" (1999) | "The Blues Man" (2000) |

"Pop a Top" is a country song written and originally recorded by Nat Stuckey in 1966. The first hit version was released by Jim Ed Brown in May 1967 as the third and final single from his album Just Jim. The song was a number 3 Billboard country single for Brown in late 1967. It was later revived by Alan Jackson as the lead-off single from his 1999 album Under the Influence. Jackson's version peaked at number 6 on the United States Billboard Hot Country Singles & Tracks chart, and number 2 on the Canadian RPM Country Tracks chart.

== Content ==
The narrator, a bar patron, asks the tender to open another bottle of beer for him, and then he'll go. He commences to tell the bartender about his grief because his girl left him, and either he'll hide it with beer, or he'll be at home remembering heɾ. The sound of a metal "pop-top" can being opened was a novelty, and that is a significant factor in the creating of this song. The metallic click and hiss sound of opening this type of container is featured several times in the song.

== Music video ==
The music video for Jackson's version was directed by Steven Goldmann, and features Cledus T. Judd.

The video opens with Judd briefly singing a parody of "Here in the Real World" ("Here in the Beer World") as he walks to the refrigerator to get a bottle of beer. Upon opening the bottle, he suddenly finds himself at a black tie event where Alan Jackson is performing. The video switches between shots of Jackson and his band onstage, Judd socializing, and various people transforming into drunk, working-class, or "country" versions of themselves whenever a glass passes in front of the camera. As the song ends, Judd finds himself back in his kitchen just as he was about to kiss a beautiful woman, and frantically starts opening more beers to try and "get the magic back."

== Chart performance ==
=== Jim Ed Brown ===
"Pop a Top" debuted at number 71 on the U.S. Billboard Hot Country Singles for the week of May 20, 1967.

| Chart (1967) | Peak position |
|---|---|
| US Hot Country Songs (Billboard) | 3 |

=== Alan Jackson ===
"Pop a Top" debuted at number 49 on the U.S. Billboard Hot Country Singles & Tracks for the week of October 9, 1999.

| Chart (1999) | Peak position |
|---|---|
| Canada Country Singles (RPM) | 2 |
| US Billboard Hot 100 | 43 |
| US Hot Country Songs (Billboard) | 6 |

==== Year-end charts ====
| Chart (2000) | Position |
|---|---|
| US Country Songs (Billboard) | 51 |

==== Certifications ====
Certifications for Pop a Top
| Region | Certification | Certified units/sales |
|---|---|---|
| United States (RIAA) | Gold | 500,000^{‡} |
^{‡} Sales+streaming figures based on certification alone.
