= Livin' on Love =

Single by Alan Jackson

from the album Who I Am
- B-side: "Let's Get Back to Me and You"
- Released: August 29, 1994
- Recorded: January 10, 1994
- Genre: Country
- Length: 3:49
- Label: Arista Nashville
- Songwriter: Alan Jackson
- Producer: Keith Stegall

Alan Jackson singles chronology
"Summertime Blues" (1994)	"Livin' on Love" (1994)	"A Good Year for the Roses" (1994)

"Livin' on Love" is a song written and recorded by American country music singer Alan Jackson. It was released in August 1994 as the second single from his album Who I Am. In late 1994, it became his ninth Number One hit on the Billboard country charts. It also reached number one on the Bubbling Under Hot 100.

== Content ==
The song describes a couple who are "livin' on love". In the first verse, they are "two young people without a thing", while throughout the song they age, still in love with each other.

== Critical reception ==
Thom Jurek of Allmusic described the song favorably, calling it "a mid-tempo honky tonker with killer fiddle, telecasters chopping up the middle, and lyrics that make its sentimental subject matter palatable." Kevin John Coyne of Country Universe gave the song a B+ grade, calling it "so catchy, so charming, and so full of little funny details." He goes on to say that he forgives Jackson for "ripping off 'Two Sparrows in a Hurricane' so blatantly."

== Music video ==
The music video was directed by Piers Plowden and premiered in mid-1994.

== Charts ==
"Livin' on Love" debuted on the U.S. Billboard Hot Country Singles & Tracks for the week of September 3, 1994.

Chart (1994)	Peak position
Canada Country Singles (RPM)	1
US Bubbling Under Hot 100 (Billboard)	1
US Hot Country Songs (Billboard)	1

=== Year-end charts ===
Chart (1994)	Position
Canada Country Tracks (RPM)	19

== Certifications ==
Region	Certification	Certified units/sales
United States (RIAA)	2× Platinum	2,000,000^{‡}
^{‡} Sales+streaming figures based on certification alone.
