= It's Five O'Clock Somewhere =

Single by Alan Jackson and Jimmy Buffett

from the album Greatest Hits Volume II
- B-side: "That'd Be Alright"
- Released: June 2, 2003
- Recorded: May 2003
- Genre: Country
- Length: 3:49
- Label: Arista Nashville
- Songwriters: Jim "Moose" Brown; Don Rollins
- Producer: Keith Stegall

Alan Jackson singles chronology
"That'd Be Alright" (2002)	"It's Five O'Clock Somewhere" (2003)	"Remember When" (2003)

Jimmy Buffett singles chronology
"Far Side of the World" (2002)	"It's Five O'Clock Somewhere" (2003)	"Hey, Good Lookin'" (2004)

"It's Five O'Clock Somewhere" is a song performed by Alan Jackson and Jimmy Buffett, and written by Jim "Moose" Brown and Don Rollins. It was released in June 2003 as the lead single from Jackson's 2003 compilation album Greatest Hits Volume II. It spent eight non-consecutive weeks at #1 on Billboard Hot Country Songs in the summer of 2003, and ranked #4 on the year-end chart. In addition, the song peaked at #17 on the Billboard Hot 100 in September, and ranked #65 on the year-end Hot 100, making it the biggest pop hit for Jackson and the first top forty hit for Buffett since the 1970s.

On November 5, 2003, it won the Country Music Association (CMA) Award for Vocal Event of the Year. It was Buffett's first award in his 30-year career. It also won two Academy of Country Music awards for Single Record of the Year and Vocal Event of the Year. The song became the #3 song of the decade on Hot Country Songs.

== Content ==
The title refers to a popular expression used to justify drinking at any time of day, given that somewhere in the world, it is 5:00 p.m., the end of the workday for a traditional "nine-to-five" worker. The narrator states that he has not had a day off in over a year and that he wants to leave work and relieve his stress by drinking alcohol. The lyrics include the phrase, "It's only half-past twelve but I don't care. It's five o'clock somewhere": even though it is not 5:00 in the narrator's time zone, it is in another part of the world. For example, a time of 12:30 p.m. in Newnan, Georgia, Jackson's hometown, usually translates to a time of 5:30 p.m. in London, England. Even though it would not exactly be 5:00 p.m. in London, one can still assume that it is five o'clock in London. If Jackson is narrating in the Pacific Time Zone, a time of 12:30 p.m. there coincides with a time of 5:00 p.m. in Newfoundland.

The lyrics request the bartender serve "something tall and strong," specifically a Hurricane, a potent cocktail made with a large amount of rum.

Just before Buffett's chorus, Jackson sings "What would Jimmy Buffett do?" both a reference to the Christian What Would Jesus Do advertising campaign and a joke at Buffett's expense, due to his large amount of alcohol-related songs.

== History ==
Jim "Moose" Brown wrote "It's Five O'Clock Somewhere" with Don Rollins (not the same Don Rollins who wrote "The Race Is On" for George Jones in 1963). Although Brown had several other cuts recorded by other artists, this song was the first to make the final cut of an album. The title lyric was inspired by a teacher who worked with Rollins. Brown recorded the demo and offered it to Kenny Chesney, who turned it down. It was then offered to Jackson, who said that he was looking for a song that he could record as a duet with Buffett.

Australian Adam Brand and the Outlaws covered the song on the 2016 album Adam Brand and the Outlaws.

== Music video ==
The music video for the song was filmed at the Square Grouper Bar in Jupiter, Florida on June 21, 2003, and was directed by Trey Fanjoy. The video premiered on CMT on July 19, 2003 during CMT's "Most Wanted Live". It features Jackson performing on a yacht (which he actually owns) called Hullbilly, and later performing at the bar amidst several patrons. When Buffett's chorus comes in, Jackson joins Buffett on stage at a large concert, which was filmed at Ruoff Music Center in Noblesville, Indiana.

== Chart performance ==
"It's Five O'Clock Somewhere" debuted at number 31 on the U.S. Billboard Hot Country Songs for the week of June 21, 2003. The song held the number 1 position for 7 consecutive weeks, falling to number 2 on the chart dated September 27, 2003, while Dierks Bentley's "What Was I Thinkin'" overtook it at number 1. On the following chart (October 4), Bentley's song fell, allowing "It's Five O'Clock Somewhere" to return to number 1 for an eighth and final week. Twenty years after its release, "It's Five O'Clock Somewhere" re-entered the Hot Country Songs chart at number 22 on the listing dated September 16, 2023, following Buffett's death on September 1 of the same year.

With its eight-week run at number one, the song tied a record with Lonestar's "Amazed" for having the longest run at number one on Hot Country Songs since Nielsen Broadcast Data Systems was initiated in 1990. Nineteen years later, this record would be surpassed by Morgan Wallen's "You Proof", which spent ten non-consecutive weeks at number one on Country Airplay.

The song has sold 1,332,000 digital copies in the US as of April 2014, and has been certified five-times platinum.

Chart (2003)	Peak position
US Hot Country Songs (Billboard)	1
US Billboard Hot 100	17

Chart (2023)	Peak position
US Hot Country Songs (Billboard)	22

=== Year-end chart ===
Chart (2003)	Peak position
US Country Songs (Billboard)	4
US Billboard Hot 100	65

== Certifications ==
Region	Certification	Certified units/sales
New Zealand (RMNZ)	Gold	15,000^{‡}
United Kingdom (BPI)	Silver	200,000^{‡}
United States (RIAA)	5× Platinum	5,000,000^{‡}
^{‡} Sales+streaming figures based on certification alone.
