= There Goes =

Single by Alan Jackson

from the album Everything I Love
- B-side: "A House with No Curtains"
- Released: July 7, 1997
- Recorded: 1996
- Genre: Country
- Length: 3:55
- Label: Arista 13070
- Songwriter: Alan Jackson
- Producer: Keith Stegall

Alan Jackson singles chronology
"Who's Cheatin' Who" (1997)	"There Goes" (1997)	"Between the Devil and Me" (1997)

"There Goes" is a song written and recorded by American country music singer Alan Jackson. It was released in July 1997 as the fourth single from his album, Everything I Love. The song reached the top of the Billboard Hot Country Singles & Tracks chart.

== Content ==
The narrator is being seduced by a woman he was trying to play hard to get with but its to no avail when she gets near him and whispers his name.

== Chart positions ==
"There Goes" debuted at number 58 on the U.S. Billboard Hot Country Singles & Tracks for the week of July 12, 1997.

Chart (1997)	Peak position
Canada Country Singles (RPM)	1
US Hot Country Songs (Billboard)	1

=== Year-end charts ===
Chart (1997)	Position
Canada Country Tracks (RPM)	47
US Country Songs (Billboard)	17
