= She's Got the Rhythm (And I Got the Blues) =

Single by Alan Jackson

from the album A Lot About Livin' (And a Little 'bout Love)
- B-side: "She Likes It Too"
- Released: October 5, 1992
- Recorded: May 27, 1992
- Genre: Country, R&B
- Length: 2:24
- Label: Arista Nashville 12463
- Songwriters: Alan Jackson; Randy Travis
- Producer: Keith Stegall

Alan Jackson singles chronology
"Love's Got a Hold on You" (1992)	"She's Got the Rhythm (And I Got the Blues)" (1992)	"Tonight I Climbed the Wall" (1993)

"She's Got the Rhythm (And I Got the Blues)" is a song written by American country music artists Alan Jackson and Randy Travis, and recorded by Jackson. It was released in October 1992 as the first single from his album A Lot About Livin' (And a Little 'bout Love). The song received an award in 1993 from Music City News for being one of the most performed country songs of the year.

== Content ==
The song is an R&B-inspired tune that Jackson and Travis wrote while on tour together in 1991. They planned to pitch the song to B.B. King to record but Jackson decided to take it and record instead.

== Critical reception ==
Leeann Ward of Country Universe gave the song an A grade," saying that it "showcases production that still sounds vibrant almost twenty years later" and the song has "steel guitar and honky tonk piano aplenty." and that the song's "concept is accentuated by its clever title and Jackson’s amusingly mournful delivery, including a pitiful 'yee haw' that ends up sounding more funny than sad, which ultimately describes the song as a whole, despite the theme of lost love."

== Music video ==
The video was directed by Jim Shea and was released in October 1992.

== Chart positions ==
"She's Got the Rhythm (And I Got the Blues)" debuted at number 42 on the U.S. Billboard Hot Country Singles & Tracks for the week of October 24, 1992.

Chart (1992)	Peak position
Canada Country Singles (RPM)	1
US Hot Country Songs (Billboard)	1

=== Year-end charts ===
Chart (1992)	Position
Canada Country Tracks (RPM)	95

Chart (1993)	Position
Canada Country Tracks (RPM)	25
