= It Must Be Love (Don Williams song) =

1979 country song written by Bob McDill

Single by Don Williams

from the album Expressions
- B-side: "Not a Chance"
- Released: July 1979
- Genre: Country
- Length: 2:29
- Label: MCA
- Songwriter: Bob McDill
- Producers: Don Williams; Garth Fundis

Don Williams singles chronology
"Lay Down Beside Me" (1979)	"It Must Be Love" (1979)	"Love Me Over Again" (1979)

"It Must Be Love" is a song written by Bob McDill, and recorded by American country music artist Don Williams. It was released in July 1979 as the third single from the album Expressions. The song was Williams' ninth Number One single on the U.S. Billboard Hot Country Singles charts.

== Charts ==
=== Weekly charts ===
Chart (1979)	Peak position
US Hot Country Songs (Billboard)	1
Canadian RPM Country Tracks	2

=== Year-end charts ===
Chart (1979)	Position
US Hot Country Songs (Billboard)	27

== Alan Jackson version ==
"It Must Be Love"

Single by Alan Jackson

from the album Under the Influence
- Released: April 24, 2000
- Genre: Country
- Length: 2:54
- Label: Arista Nashville
- Songwriter: Bob McDill
- Producer: Keith Stegall

Alan Jackson singles chronology
"The Blues Man" (2000)	"It Must Be Love" (2000)	"www.memory" (2000)

In 2000, country music artist Alan Jackson recorded a cover of the song and released it as the third single from his album Under the Influence. Like Williams' version before it, Jackson's cover also reached Number One on the Billboard country charts, a position that it held for one week. It also managed to reach the Top 40 on the Billboard Hot 100, peaking at #37.

=== Chart performance ===
"It Must Be Love" debuted at number 68 on the U.S. Billboard Hot Country Singles & Tracks for the week of April 29, 2000.

Chart (2000)	Peak position
Canada Country Singles (RPM)	4
US Billboard Hot 100	37
US Hot Country Songs (Billboard)	1

==== Year-end charts ====
Chart (2000)	Position
US Country Songs (Billboard)	11

==== Certifications ====
Certifications for It Must Be Love
Region	Certification	Certified units/sales
United States (RIAA)	Gold	500,000^{‡}
^{‡} Sales+streaming figures based on certification alone.
