= Who's Cheatin' Who =

Song by Charly McClain

Single by Charly McClain

from the album Who's Cheatin' Who
- B-side: "Love Scenes"
- Released: November 1980
- Genre: Country
- Length: 2:15
- Label: Epic
- Songwriter: Jerry Hayes
- Producer: Larry Rogers

Charly McClain singles chronology
"Women Get Lonely" (1980)	"Who's Cheatin' Who" (1980)	"Surround Me with Love" (1981)

"Who's Cheatin' Who" is a country music song written by Jerry Hayes and initially recorded by Charly McClain. It was the title track of her 1980 album for Epic Records, released in November 1980 as a single with "Love Scenes" on the B-side, and in early 1981, was her first Number One hit on the Billboard country charts. 17 years later, Alan Jackson had chart success with the song as well, with his version reaching number two on the same chart.

== Charts ==
Chart (1980–1981)	Peak position
US Hot Country Songs (Billboard)	1
Canadian RPM Country Tracks	2

== Alan Jackson version ==
"Who's Cheatin' Who"

Single by Alan Jackson

from the album Everything I Love
- B-side: "Buicks to the Moon"
- Released: April 7, 1997
- Genre: Country
- Length: 4:01 (album version)
- Label: Arista Nashville
- Songwriter: Jerry Hayes
- Producer: Keith Stegall

Alan Jackson singles chronology
"Everything I Love" (1997)	"Who's Cheatin' Who" (1997)	"There Goes" (1997)

In 1997, Alan Jackson included the song on his album Everything I Love, releasing it as a single that year. Jackson's cover features several solos after the last chorus. Jackson also switches the song's pronouns to put it in a male's perspective. His version includes a series of extended electric guitar and piano solos before the final chorus.

=== Music video ===
The music video was directed by Brad Fuller and premiered in mid-1997 on CMT. It was filmed on location in Concord, North Carolina. Many of NASCAR's Ford drivers had a part in the video, like Rusty Wallace (who played the ending guitar solo), John Andretti, Jeremy Mayfield, Kenny Irwin Jr. (whose #98 Raybestos Ford F-150 NASCAR SuperTruck is driven at one point by Jackson in a "race", before Alan drives off the track and returns in the Bigfoot monster truck), Dale Jarrett, Mark Martin, Bill Elliott and Ernie Irvan.

=== Charts ===
"Who's Cheatin' Who" debuted at number 61 on the U.S. Billboard Hot Country Singles & Tracks for the week of April 12, 1997.

Chart (1997)	Peak position
Canada Country Singles (RPM)	2
US Hot Country Songs (Billboard)	2

=== Year-end charts ===
Chart (1997)	Position
Canada Country Tracks (RPM)	53
US Country Songs (Billboard)	20

=== Certifications ===
Certifications for Who's Cheatin' Who
Region	Certification	Certified units/sales
United States (RIAA)	Gold	500,000^{‡}
^{‡} Sales+streaming figures based on certification alone.

== See also ==
- List of number-one country singles of 1981 (U.S.)
