= Little Bitty =

1996 song by Alan Jackson

Single by Alan Jackson

from the album Everything I Love
- B-side: "Must've Had a Ball"
- Released: October 14, 1996
- Recorded: June 1996
- Genre: Country
- Length: 2:38
- Label: Arista Nashville
- Songwriter: Tom T. Hall
- Producer: Keith Stegall

Alan Jackson singles chronology
"Home" (1996)	"Little Bitty" (1996)	"Everything I Love" (1997)

"Little Bitty" is a song recorded by American country music artist Alan Jackson. It was released in October 1996 as the lead-off single to Jackson's fifth studio album Everything I Love. The song reached the top of the U.S. Billboard country music charts in December of that year, becoming his fourteenth Number One on that chart. It also reached number-one on the Canadian RPM Country Tracks and peaked at number 58 on the U.S. Billboard Hot 100 chart.

The song was written by Tom T. Hall. Hall had been retired from songwriting for about a decade at the time "Little Bitty" and several other new Hall compositions were released.

== Content ==
The song is an up-tempo number in which the narrator states that some of life's greatest joys are found in the simplicity and small things of life.

== Critical reception ==
Deborah Evans Price, of Billboard magazine reviewed the song favorably saying that Jackson's "smooth, effortless performance is right on target." She went on to say that the lyrics were clever and that country fans had appreciated the writer Hall's style of lyrics for a long time.

== Music video ==
The music video was directed by Roger Pistole and it was released on October 18, 1996, on CMT.

== Chart positions ==
"Little Bitty" debuted at number 41 on the U.S. Billboard Hot Country Singles & Tracks for the week of October 26, 1996.

Chart (1996)	Peak position
Canada Country Singles (RPM)	2
US Billboard Hot 100	58
US Hot Country Songs (Billboard)	1

=== Year-end charts ===
Chart (1996)	Position
Canada Country Tracks (RPM)	91

Chart (1997)	Position
Canada Country Tracks (RPM)	90
US Country Songs (Billboard)	63

== Certifications ==
Region	Certification	Certified units/sales
New Zealand (RMNZ)	Gold	15,000^{‡}
United States (RIAA)	2× Platinum	2,000,000^{‡}
^{‡} Sales+streaming figures based on certification alone.

== Parodies ==
- American country music parody artist Cledus T. Judd released a parody of "Little Bitty" titled "Mindy McCready" on his 1998 album Did I Shave My Back for This?
