= Carson Chamberlain =

American songwriter

- Born: Berea, Kentucky
- Genres: Country
- Occupations: Songwriter; record producer; session musician
- Instrument: Pedal steel guitar
- Years active: 1980s–present

Carson Chamberlain (born in Berea, Kentucky) is an American songwriter, record producer and session musician who works mainly in the field of country music.

He worked as a bandleader and steel guitarist for Keith Whitley until Whitley died in 1989. Afterward, he worked as a touring manager for Alan Jackson and Clint Black. Chamberlain became an A&R director at Mercury Nashville in 1994, but later retired from that position. He has also worked as a record producer for several Mercury acts, including Mark Wills, Billy Currington and Easton Corbin.

Chamberlain co-wrote the songs "Love's Got a Hold on You", "Everything I Love" and "Between the Devil and Me" for Jackson; "The Best Day" for George Strait; and "Walk a Little Straighter" and "I Got a Feelin'" for Currington.
