= Harley Allen =

American singer-songwriter

- Born: Harley Lee Allen; January 23, 1956; Dayton, Ohio, United States
- Died: March 30, 2011 (aged 55) Brentwood, Tennessee, United States
- Genres: Country, bluegrass
- Occupation: Singer-songwriter
- Instruments: Guitar, mandolin
- Years active: 1970s–1990s
- Labels: Folkways, PolyGram, Rounder

Harley Lee Allen (January 23, 1956 – March 30, 2011) was an American bluegrass and country singer and songwriter.

== Early life ==
Allen was born in Dayton, Ohio, the son of bluegrass performer Red Allen.

== Discography ==
=== Studio albums ===
Title	Album details
Another River	Release date: November 5, 1996; Label: PolyGram Records

=== Singles ===
Year	Single	Album
1996	"Old Love Dreamin'"	Another River
1996	"The Waving Girl"	Another River
1996	"Boy She Did"	Another River
1997	"Love Ain't Supposed to Hurt"	Another River

=== Music videos ===
Year	Video	Director
1996	"Boy She Did"	Lynn Spinnato

== Career ==
Allen appeared on several 1970s albums with his brothers as the Allen Brothers: Allengrass (Lemco Records), Sweet Rumors (Rounder Records), Clara's Boys (Rounder Records), Are You Feeling It Too (Folkways Records), Red Allen Favorites (King Bluegrass Records). He recorded three solo albums, Across The Blueridge Mountains (Folkways, 1983), Another River (PolyGram, 1996) and Live At The Bluebird (2001).

He was most known for providing background vocals on the song "I Am a Man of Constant Sorrow" from the O Brother, Where Art Thou? soundtrack. He won two Grammy Awards for that recording in 2002, in the Best Country Collaboration with Vocals and Album of the Year categories.

Allen performed on two bluegrass tribute albums for the British rock band the Moody Blues: Moody Bluegrass: A Nashville Tribute to the Moody Blues (2004), and Moody Bluegrass TWO... Much Love (2011). The latter album was released after Allen's death.

== Personal life ==
Allen is survived by his three brothers, Ronnie, Greg and Mark Allen; his sister, Debbie Allen; his wife; their two daughters, Katelyn and Maggie; and son, Aaron. Mother Clara of Dayton, Ohio

== Death ==
Allen died of lung cancer on March 30, 2011, at his home in Brentwood, Tennessee.

== Songs written ==
The singles/songs written or co-written by Allen have been, among others, performed by:

- Gary Allan ("Bourbon Borderline", "The Devil's Candy", "I Just Got Back From Hell", Learning To Live With Me", "Tough Little Boys")
- Dierks Bentley ("My Last Name")
- Garth Brooks ("Rollin'")
- Tracy Byrd ("Cowgirl")
- John Conlee ("Pass It On", "She's Mine")
- Billy Currington ("Like My Dog")
- The Del McCoury Band ("Keep Her While She's There", "Never Grow Up Boy")
- Joe Diffie ("Something I Do For Me")
- Ty England ("New Faces in the Field")
- Alan Jackson ("Another Good Reason", "Between the Devil and Me", "Everything I Love", "I Slipped And Fell in Love", "I Still Love You", "Life Or Love", "Meat And Potato Man", "The Angels Cried", "Who I Am")
- George Jones ("The Man He Was")
- Sammy Kershaw ("For Years")
- Hal Ketchum ("No Easy Road")
- Alison Krauss & Union Station ("It Doesn't Matter")
- Jake Mathews ("That's Why They Call It Cheatin'")
- Kathy Mattea ("Live It")
- John Michael Montgomery ("Cool", "December 1943", "I Wanna Be There", "The Little Girl")
- Craig Morgan ("Paradise")
- Joe Nichols ("I'll Wait for You", "If Nobody Believed in You")
- Linda Ronstadt ("High Sierra")
- Shannon Walker ("That's Why God Made Me", "Mommy All The Time", "His Father's Son", "Before I Let You Go", "Walk Out of the Rain")
- Blake Shelton ("The Baby", "The Bartender", "When Somebody Knows You That Well")
- Daryle Singletary ("That's Why God Made Me")
- Ricky Skaggs ("A Simple Life", "Spread A Little Love Around")
- Darden Smith ("Seven Wonders")
- Josh Turner ("I Had One One Time")
- Rhonda Vincent ("In Your Loneliness", "When Love Arrives")
- Don Williams ("Gulf Shore Line")
- Mark Wills ("Still Waiting")
- Darryl Worley ("Awful, Beautiful Life", "Spread A Little Love Around")
- Lonesome River Band ("Stray Dogs & Alley Cats")
- Ronnie Bowman ("Merry Christmas, Ho Ho Ho")
- Melonie Cannon ("Nobody Hops A Train Anymore")
- The Allen Brothers ("Wildwood Flower Blues")
- Britt Ballenger ("Make You Mine", "A Simple Life")
- Sister Sadie ("Mama's Room")
