= Alan Jackson =

American singer and songwriter (born 1958)

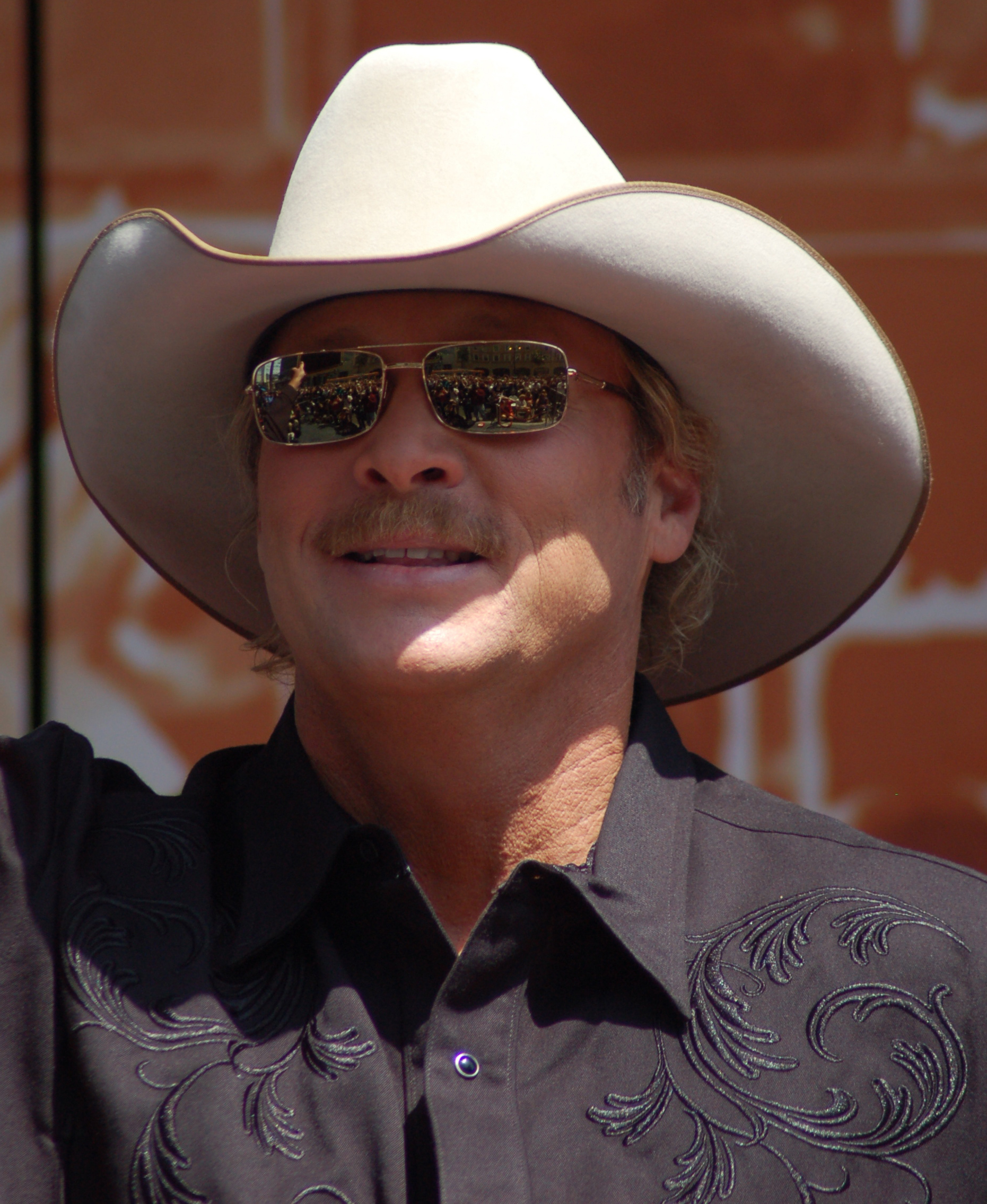
- Jackson in 2010

Background information
- Born: Alan Eugene Jackson; October 17, 1958 (age 68); Newnan, Georgia, U.S.
- Genres: Neotraditional country; bluegrass; gospel
- Occupations: Singer; songwriter
- Instruments: Vocals; guitar
- Years active: 1987–2026
- Labels: Arista Nashville; EMI Nashville; Alan's Country Records
- Spouse: Denise Jackson (m. 1979)
- Website: alanjackson.com

Alan Eugene Jackson (born October 17, 1958) is an American retired country singer-songwriter. He is known for performing a style widely regarded as "neotraditional country", as well as writing many of his own songs. Jackson has recorded twenty-one studio albums, including two Christmas albums and two gospel albums, and has released three greatest-hits albums. Jackson is one of the best-selling music artists of all time, having sold over 75 million records worldwide, with 44 million sold in the United States alone.

He has had sixty-six songs appear on the Billboard Hot Country Songs chart, thirty-five of which claimed the number one spot. Out of fifteen titles to reach the Billboard Top Country Albums chart, nine have been certified multi-Platinum. He is the recipient of two Grammy Awards, sixteen Country Music Association (CMA) Awards, and seventeen Academy of Country Music (ACM) Awards. He is a member of the Grand Ole Opry, and was inducted into the Georgia Music Hall of Fame in 2001. He was inducted into the Country Music Hall of Fame in 2017 by Loretta Lynn and into the Nashville Songwriters Hall of Fame in 2018.

Jackson is known for songs such as "Chattahoochee", "Livin' on Love", "Where Were You (When the World Stopped Turning)", "It's Five O'Clock Somewhere", and "Remember When". He held his final concert on June 27, 2026, because of his Charcot–Marie–Tooth disease.

== Early life ==
Jackson was born to Joseph Eugene "Daddy Gene" Jackson (1927–2000) and Ruth Musick "Mama Ruth" Jackson (1930–2017) in Newnan, Georgia, and has four older sisters. He and his immediate family lived in a small home built around his grandfather's old toolshed. The family is primarily of English descent. His mother lived in the home until her death on January 7, 2017. He began writing music in 1983.

Growing up, Jackson listened primarily to gospel music, until a friend introduced him to Gene Watson, John Anderson, and Hank Williams Jr. Jackson attended the local Elm Street Elementary and Newnan High School, and joined the band Dixie Steel after graduation. Jackson worked as a construction worker and forklift operator while playing in small clubs across Georgia. When he was 27, Jackson and his wife of six years, Denise, moved from Newnan to Nashville, Tennessee, where he hoped to pursue music full-time. In 1987, Jackson cut a pre-debut demo album titled New Traditional at Doc's Place in Hendersonville, Tennessee, but it is extremely rare and was released only in Japan.

== Career ==
In Tennessee, Jackson got his first job in The Nashville Network's mailroom and would sit in the audience during tapings of TNN's You Can Be a Star, a television singing competition featuring celebrity judges. On an episode in 1986, then 27-year-old Jackson was plucked from the audience and asked to sing a song as an outro to a commercial break. Jackson sang "He Stopped Loving Her Today" by George Jones, earning a round of applause from the audience, and the attention of guest judge and singer-songwriter Keith Stegall. Stegall would eventually produce nineteen of Jackson's albums.

Around this time, Jackson's wife Denise, a flight attendant, encountered Glen Campbell on a flight, and requested advice for her husband. Campbell handed her the business card of his manager and told her to call, which further helped jumpstart his career. Jackson eventually signed with Arista, and in 1989, he became the first artist signed to the newly formed Arista Nashville branch of Arista Records. Arista released Jackson's debut single, "Blue Blooded Woman", in late 1989. Although the song failed to reach the Top 40 on the Hot Country Songs chart, he reached number 3 by early 1990 with "Here in the Real World". This song served as the title track to his debut album, Here in the Real World, which also included two more top five hits ("Wanted" and "Chasin' That Neon Rainbow") and his first number one, "I'd Love You All Over Again". Don't Rock the Jukebox was the title of Jackson's second album. Released in 1991, it included four number-one singles: the title track, "Someday", "Dallas" and "Love's Got a Hold on You", and the number three "Midnight in Montgomery". Jackson also co-wrote several songs on Randy Travis' 1991 album High Lonesome.

A Lot About Livin' (And a Little 'bout Love), his third album, accounted for the number one hits "She's Got the Rhythm (And I Got the Blues)" (which Randy Travis co-wrote) and "Chattahoochee", plus the top five hits "Tonight I Climbed the Wall", "Mercury Blues" and "(Who Says) You Can't Have It All". "Chattahoochee" also won him the 1994 Country Music Association (CMA) awards for Single and Song of the Year. In 1994, Jackson left his management company, Ten Ten Management, which had overseen his career up to that point, and switched to Gary Overton. His fourth album was titled Who I Am, and it contained four number one hits: a cover of the Eddie Cochran rockabilly standard "Summertime Blues", followed by "Livin' on Love", "Gone Country" and "I Don't Even Know Your Name". An additional track from the album, a cover of Rodney Crowell's "Song for the Life", made number six. In late 1994, Clay Walker reached number one with "If I Could Make a Living", which Jackson co-wrote. Jackson also appeared in the 1996 "When Harry Kept Delores" episode of Home Improvement, performing "Mercury Blues".

=== Mid-to-late 1990s ===
The Greatest Hits Collection was released on October 24, 1995. The disc contained seventeen hits, two newly recorded songs ("I'll Try" and "Tall, Tall Trees"), and the song "Home" from Here in the Real World that had never been released as a single. These first two songs both charted at number one. Everything I Love followed in 1996. Its first single, the Tom T. Hall-penned "Little Bitty", took Jackson to the top of the charts in late 1996. The album also included the number one hit "There Goes" and a number two cover of Charly McClain's 1980 single "Who's Cheatin' Who". The album's fifth single was "A House with No Curtains", which became his first release since 1989 to miss the top 10.

1998's High Mileage was led off by the number four "I'll Go On Loving You". After it came the album's only number one hit, "Right on the Money", co-written by Phil Vassar and Charlie Black. With Jackson's release of Under the Influence in 1999, he took the double risk on an album of covers of country classics while retaining a traditional sound when a rock- and pop-tinged sound dominated country radio. When the Country Music Association (CMA) asked George Jones to trim his act to 90 seconds for the 1999 CMA awards, Jones decided to boycott this event. In solidarity, Jackson interrupted his own song and launched into Jones's song "Choices" and then walked offstage.

=== 2000s ===
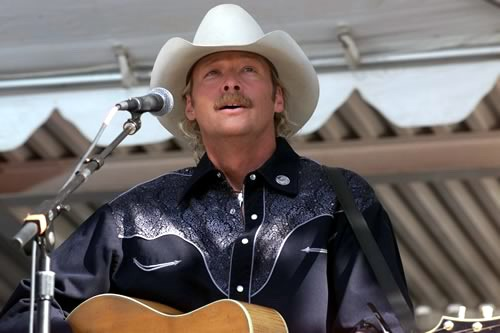
Jackson performing in 2002

Due to a shift in the sound of country music towards a more pop sound in the 1990s and 2000s, he and George Strait criticized the state of country music in the song "Murder on Music Row". The song sparked debate in the country music community about whether "traditional" country music was actually dead or not. Despite the fact that the song was not officially released as a single, it became the highest-charting nonseasonal album cut (not available in any retail single configuration or released as a promotional single to radio during a chart run) to appear on Hot Country Singles & Tracks in the Broadcast Data Systems era, beating the record previously held by Garth Brooks' "Belleau Wood." The duo were invited to open the 2000 Academy of Country Music Awards (ACMAs) with a performance of the tune. Rolling Stone commented on Jackson's style remarking, "If Garth and Shania have raised the bar for country concerts with Kiss-style production and endless costume changes, then Alan Jackson is doing his best to return the bar to a more human level." After the September 11, 2001 attacks, Jackson released "Where Were You (When the World Stopped Turning)" as a tribute to those killed in the 9/11 terrorist attacks. The country/soft rock song became a hit single and briefly propelled him into the mainstream spotlight; Jackson had debuted the song at the 2001 CMA Awards and his performance was generally considered the highlight of the show. Jackson's website crashed the next day from server requests. The song came to Jackson suddenly, and had not been scheduled for any official release, but the live performance began receiving radio airplay and was soon released as a single. It was included on his 2002 album Drive, both the live version from his CMA performance, and a radio version.

Jackson released his second Christmas album (after Honky Tonk Christmas in 1993), titled Let It Be Christmas on October 22, 2002. Jeannie Kendall contacted Jackson to do a duet, and he suggested the song "Timeless and True Love"; the song appeared on her first solo album, released in 2003. In early 2006, Jackson released his first gospel music album entitled Precious Memories. He put together the album at the request of his mother, who enjoyed religious music. Jackson considered this album a "side project" and nothing too official, but it was ultimately treated as such. More than 1.8 million units were eventually sold.

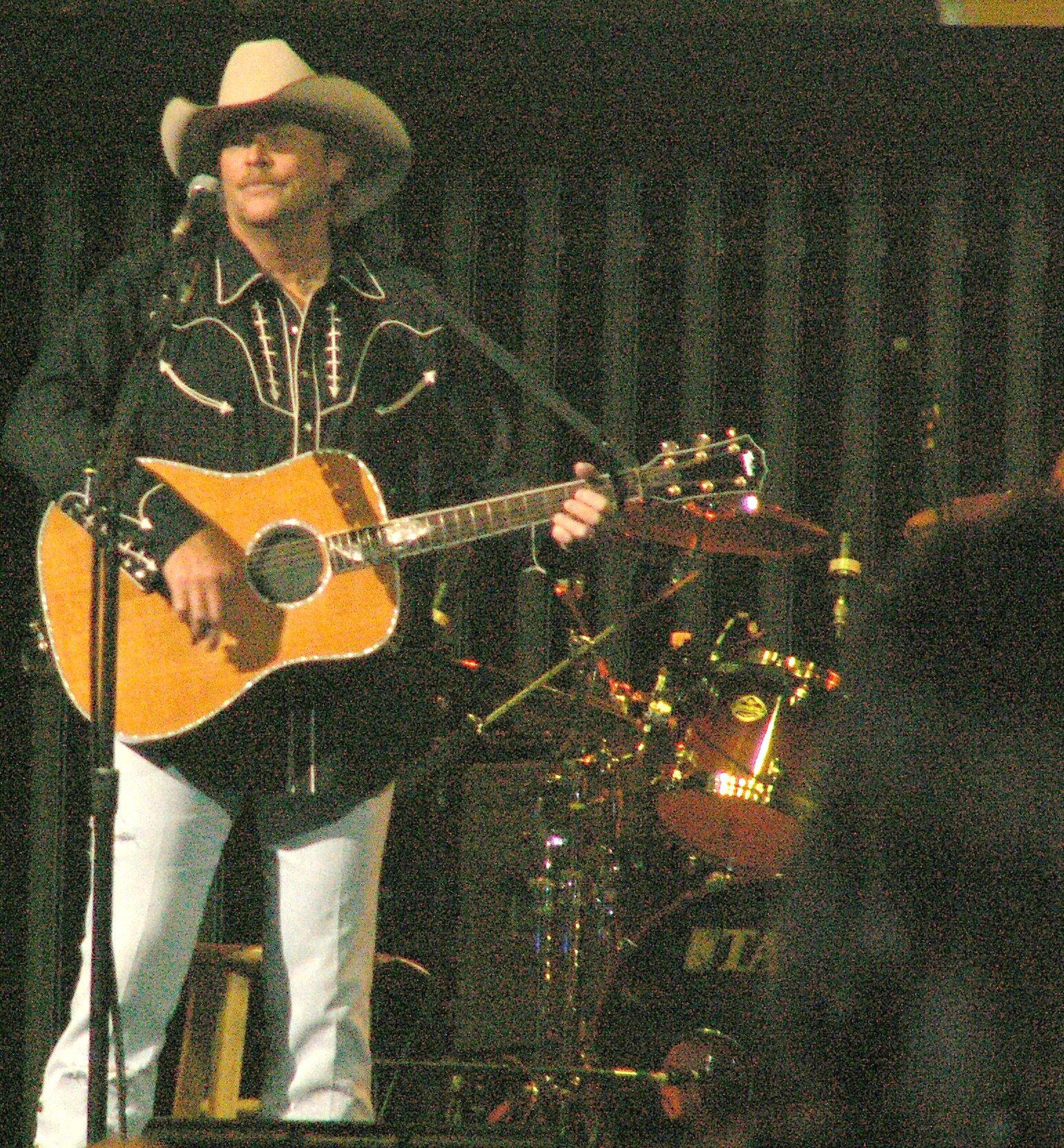
Jackson performing in 2005

Just a few months later, Jackson released his next album, Like Red on a Rose. Originally intended to be a bluegrass album, Like Red on a Rose had a different producer and sound. Keith Stegall was notably absent from this album and, instead, Alison Krauss took over the producing reins. Unlike Jackson's previous albums, the album abandoned Jackson's typical neotraditional country style and instead, went for a soft rock/adult contemporary sound. This move proved controversial for his fans, who accused him of abandoning his signature style in order to go for a more commercial pop route. Although critically acclaimed, the album was considered a commercial disappointment for the singer. For his next album, he went back to his country roots. Good Time was released on March 4, 2008. The album's first single, "Small Town Southern Man", was released to radio on November 19, 2007. "Country Boy", "Good Time", "Sissy's Song" and "I Still Like Bologna", were also released as singles. "Sissy's Song" is dedicated to a longtime friend of the Jackson family (Leslie "Sissy" Fitzgerald) who worked in their house every day. Fitzgerald was killed in a motorcycle accident in mid-2007.

=== 2010s and 2020s ===
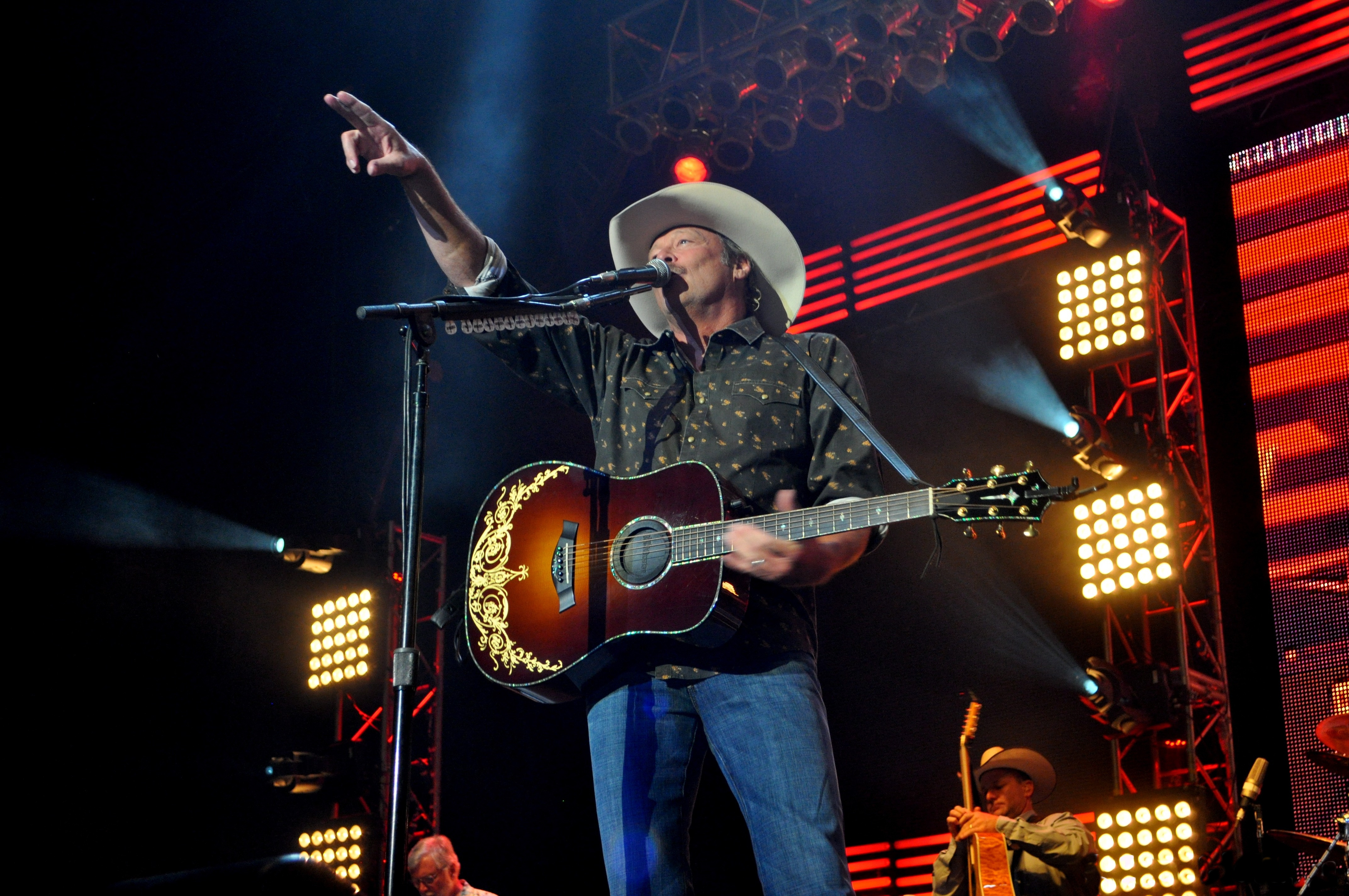
Jackson performing in 2012

His sixteenth studio album, Freight Train, was released on March 30, 2010. The first single was "It's Just That Way", which debuted at No. 50 in January 2010. "Hard Hat and a Hammer" is the album's second single, released in May 2010. On November 23, 2010, Jackson released another greatest-hits package, entitled 34 Number Ones, which features a cover of the Johnny Cash hit "Ring of Fire", as well as the duet with Zac Brown Band, "As She's Walking Away". On January 20, 2011, Sony Music Nashville announced that Jackson and his Sony-owned record label, Arista Nashville, had parted. In March of that year, Jackson announced his new deal with Capitol's EMI Records Nashville. It was a joint venture between ACR (Alan's Country Records) and Capitol. All records were to be released and marketed through Capitol's EMI Records Nashville label.

In 2012, Jackson released the album Thirty Miles West. Three singles were released from the album: "Long Way to Go", "So You Don't Have to Love Me Anymore" and "You Go Your Way". None of the singles reached the top 20. A tour in 2013 supported the album. Jackson released his second gospel album, Precious Memories Volume II, on March 26, 2013. Later that same year, Jackson released his first (and so far, only) bluegrass album, simply titled The Bluegrass Album. Two singles were released from the album: "Blue Ridge Mountain Song" and "Blacktop". The album eventually peaked at no. 1 on the Billboard Top Bluegrass Albums chart and no. 3 on the country chart. In 2014, Jackson recorded the opening credits song, "A Million Ways to Die", for the film A Million Ways to Die in the West, co-writing the song with Seth MacFarlane and Joel McNeely.

In August 2014, the Country Music Hall of Fame opened an exhibit celebrating Jackson's 25 years in the music industry. It was also announced that he was an artist in residency as well, performing shows on October 8 and 22. The exhibit highlights the different milestones in his career with memorabilia collected over the years. His twenty-fifth anniversary "Keeping It Country" tour, began on January 8, 2015, in Estero, Florida. In January 2015, Jackson began his 25th anniversary "Keepin' It Country" tour, followed in April with the announcement of his twentieth studio album, Angels and Alcohol, which was released on July 17. In 2016, Jackson was selected as one of 30 artists to perform on "Forever Country", a mash-up track of "Take Me Home, Country Roads", "On the Road Again" and "I Will Always Love You" which celebrates 50 years of the CMA Awards. In 2016 and 2017, Jackson extended his "Keepin' It Country" tour with American Idol alumna Lauren Alaina. In August 2016, Legacy Recordings released the collection Genuine: The Alan Jackson Story digitally and on three CDs with 59 tracks including eight previously unreleased tracks which was dedicated to Merle Haggard's memory. The collection was initially released as a Walmart exclusive in November 2015, with a worldwide release in August 2016. In October 2017, Alan Jackson released a new song titled "The Older I Get" for a planned future studio album. The album Where Have You Gone would be released four years later; the record features an even harder, more traditional country sound than Jackson's usual repertoire, with Jackson noting in interviews that he feared that "country music is gone, and it's not coming back."

== Awards, nominations, and Georgia Music Hall of Fame ==
Jackson was nominated for six CMAs in 1989 and four more in 1994, including one for Entertainer of the Year. He became a member of the Grand Ole Opry in 1991 and was inducted by Roy Acuff and Randy Travis. Jackson was the most nominated artist at the 29th annual TNN/Music City News Country Awards (at the Grand Ole Opry House) that was broadcast June 5, 1995. His six nominations included best entertainer, male artist, vocal collaboration, album, single, and video (two nominations in this category). At the 2002 CMAs, Jackson set a record for having the most nominations in a single year – ten – many rising from the song "Where Were You". It also brought his career total up to the second number of most nominations ever, after George Strait. "Where Were You" also was nominated for a Grammy for Song of the Year. At the 2003 Academy of Country Music Awards, Jackson won Album of the Year for Drive and Video of the Year for the video to "Drive (For Daddy Gene)."

In 2004, a five-mile (8 km) stretch of Interstate 85 through Jackson's hometown of Newnan was renamed the "Alan Jackson Highway" in the singer's honor. After learning of the honor, he stated "[Newnan] was a great place to grow up. I'm not sure I'm quite qualified for the main highway. Maybe they should've picked a dirt road or something." Jackson was inducted into the Georgia Music Hall of Fame on October 22, 2001, in Atlanta. Alan Jackson was selected to receive a star on the Hollywood Walk of Fame in 2010. In 2017, Alan Jackson was inducted into the Country Music Hall of Fame.

== Touring ==
Jackson headlined the 1995 Fruit of the Loom Comfort Tour, a deal worth $40 million. It began January 20 in New Orleans and ran for a hundred dates. Alan Jackson's 2004 concert tour launched January 23 in Fort Myers, Florida, and was sponsored by NAPA Auto Parts in a deal that included Jackson's endorsement in TV spots. The tour included more than 50 U.S. dates. Martina McBride was the opening for some of the shows. In March 2011, he visited Australia to perform for the CMC Rocks The Hunter music festival where he was the headline act for Saturday night. In 2015, Jackson kicked off his 25th Anniversary Keepin' It Country tour. The tour began with a concert in Estero, Florida, on January 8 at the Germane Arena. Jon Pardi & Brandy Clark are special guests for most concerts of the tour. The tour wrapped with a solo concert in Highland Park, Illinois, at the Ravinia Pavilion on August 31.

In March 2022, Jackson announced his farewell tour "One More For The Road Tour." Jackson held his last concert on June 27, 2026, because of his Charcot–Marie–Tooth disease.

== Band members ==
Jackson records his studio albums, in most part, with the backing of some of the members of his live band, the Strayhorns.

Current members

- Danny Groah – lead guitar
- Bruce Rutherford – drums
- Joey Schmidt – keyboards
- Roger Wills – bass guitar
- Scott Coney – acoustic and baritone guitars, banjo, occasional fiddle (2005-present)
- Ryan Joseph Ogrodny – harmony and backing vocals, fiddle, mandolin (2012-present)
- Rusty Danmyer – steel guitar

Former members

- Robbie Flint - steel guitar
- Mark McClurg – harmony and backing vocals, fiddle, mandolin
- Monty Lane Allen - harmony and backing vocals, acoustic rhythm guitar
- Melodie Crittenden – harmony and backing vocals (2008)

== Personal life ==
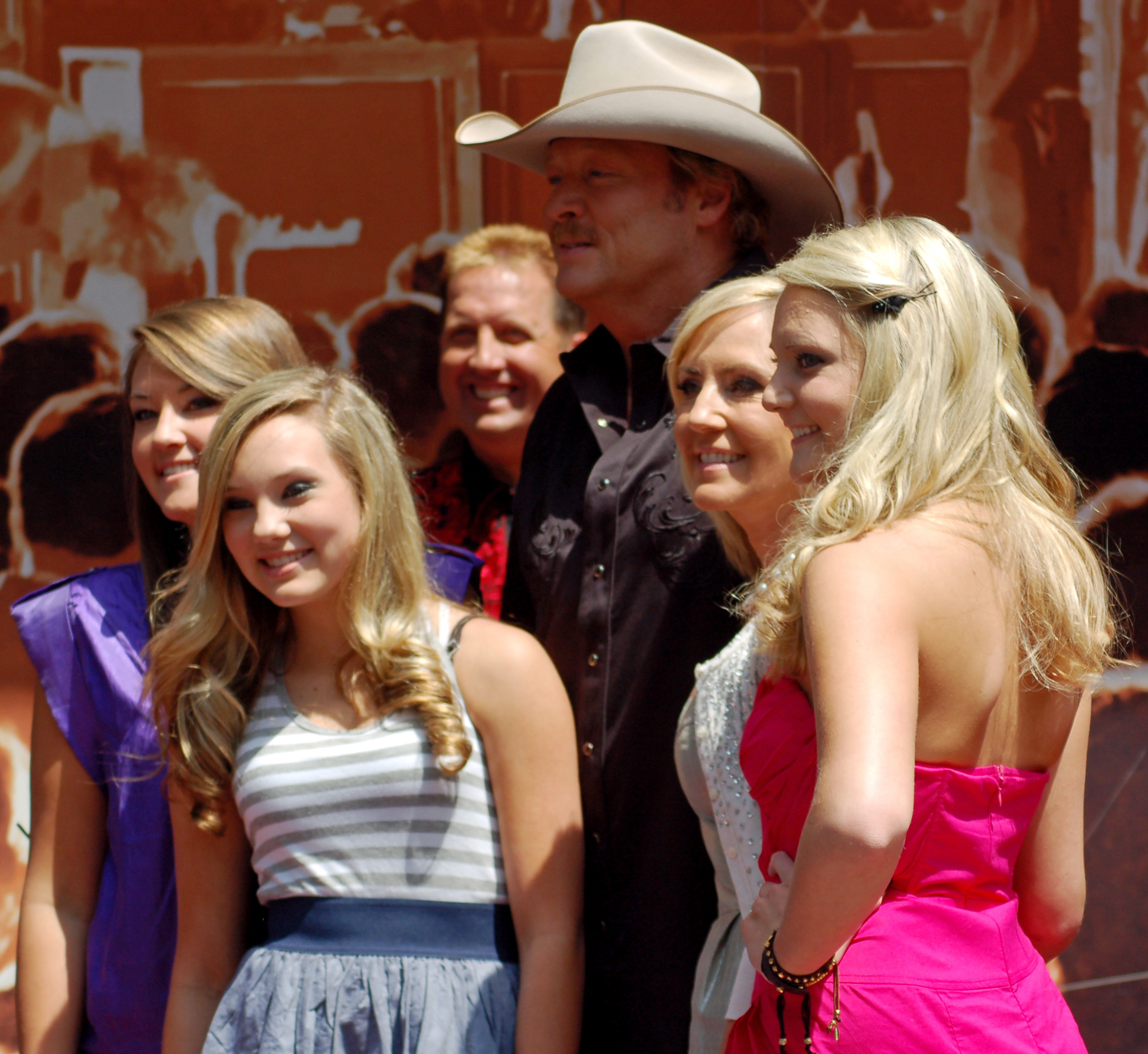
Jackson with his family at a ceremony to receive a star on the Hollywood Walk of Fame in April 2010

Jackson married his high school sweetheart, Denise Jackson, on December 15, 1979. They have three daughters: Mattie Denise Smith (born June 19, 1990), Alexandra Jane "Ali" (born August 23, 1993), and Dani Grace (born August 28, 1997). The couple became grandparents in December 2022 when their daughter Ali and her husband Sam Bradshaw welcomed their first child, a son. Although Alan and Denise separated for several months in 1998 due to the strains of Jackson's career, they have since reconciled.

Denise Jackson wrote a book that topped The New York Times Best Seller list about her life with Jackson, their relationship, their brief separation and recommitment to each other, and her commitment to Christianity. The book, It's All About Him: Finding the Love of My Life, was published in 2007. In May 2008, she released a gift book titled The Road Home. Jackson's nephew, Adam Wright, is also a country music singer-songwriter. Adam and his wife, Shannon, perform together as a duo called The Wrights. The Wrights co-wrote two songs and sang harmony vocals on Jackson's What I Do album. Jackson is a cousin of former Major League Baseball player Brandon Moss. In June 2009, Jackson listed his 135-acre (0.55 km^{2}) estate just outside Franklin, Tennessee, for sale, asking $38 million. The property sold in late May 2010 for $28 million, one of the highest prices ever for a home sale in the Nashville area. In 2010, the singer then moved into a home in the same Nashville suburb. The singer and his wife paid $3.675 million for the estate in June 2010, but less than a year later they listed the home for $3.995 million.

Jackson maintained a close friendship with fellow country singer George Jones. Jones has been mentioned in songs such as "Don't Rock the Jukebox" (Jones also appeared in the video which accompanied it) and "Murder on Music Row." The song "Just Playin' Possum" is dedicated to Jones and talks of how Alan only wants to lie low and play possum (with "possum" referring to George Jones). Jones can also be seen in the video for "Good Time." In 2008, Jones was a surprise guest at Jackson's "CMT Giants" ceremony, where he thanked Jackson for his friendship. He is also close friends with George Strait, who sang "Murder on Music Row" with him. Besides his associations with big stars, Jackson maintains his connections to his roots and old friends.

At George Jones' funeral service, on May 2, 2013, Jackson performed one of Jones' classics, "He Stopped Loving Her Today", at the close of the service at the Grand Ole Opry in Nashville.

In 2016, Jackson opened AJ's Good Time Bar in Nashville's Lower Broadway. The multi-floor honky-tonk venue is named after his 2008 song "Good Time". Jackson paid $5.75 million for 421 Broadway which at the time was a record for a Lower Broadway building.

An avid classic car collector, Jackson's collection includes an Amphicar, a 1968 Shelby GT 500 KR Convertible and a 1970 Chevelle SS 396, among others.

In a 2021 appearance on The Today Show, Jackson announced he had Charcot–Marie–Tooth disease (CMT), stating "...it's been affecting me for years. And it's getting more and more obvious. And I know I'm stumbling around on stage. And now I'm having a little trouble balancing, even in front of the microphone, and so I just feel very uncomfortable."

== Selected discography ==
- New Traditional (1987)
- Here in the Real World (1990)
- Don't Rock the Jukebox (1991)
- A Lot About Livin' (And a Little 'Bout Love) (1992)
- Honky Tonk Christmas (1993)
- Who I Am (1994)
- Everything I Love (1996)
- High Mileage (1998)
- Under the Influence (1999)
- When Somebody Loves You (2000)
- Drive (2002)
- Let It Be Christmas (2002)
- What I Do (2004)
- Precious Memories (2006)
- Like Red on a Rose (2006)
- Good Time (2008)
- Freight Train (2010)
- Thirty Miles West (2012)
- Precious Memories Volume II (2013)
- The Bluegrass Album (2013)
- Angels and Alcohol (2015)
- Where Have You Gone (2021)

== Awards ==
American Music Awards

- American Music Award for Favorite Country Single 1993; "Chattahoochee"
- 1993 Favorite Country Album – "A Lot About Livin' (And a Little 'bout Love)"

Academy of Country Music Awards

- 1990 - Top New Male Vocalist
- 1991 - Album of the Year ("Don't Rock the Jukebox")
- 1991 - Single of the Year ("Don't Rock the Jukebox")
- 1993 - Album of the Year ("A Lot About Livin' (And a Little 'bout Love)")
- 1993 - Single of the Year ("Chattahoochee")
- 1994 - Top Male Vocalist
- 1995 - Top Male Vocalist
- 2001 - Top Male Vocalist
- 2001 - Single of the Year ("Where Were You (When the World Stopped Turning)")
- 2001 - Song of the Year ("Where Were You (When the World Stopped Turning)")
- 2002 - Album of the Year ("Drive")
- 2002 - Video of the Year ("Drive (For Daddy Gene)")
- 2003 - Single of the Year ("It's Five O'Clock Somewhere")
- 2003 - Vocal Event of the Year ("It's Five O'Clock Somewhere")
- 2018 - Cliffie Stone Icon Award
- 2025 - Alan Jackson Lifetime Achievement Award

Billboard Music Awards

- 2014 Top Christian Album - "Precious Memories Volume II"

CMT Music Awards

- 2022 Artist of a Lifetime

Country Music Association

- 1992 Music Video of the Year – "Midnight in Montgomery"
- 1993 Music Video of the Year – "Chattahoochee"
- 1993 Single of the Year – "Chattahoochee"
- 1993 Vocal Event of the Year – "I Don't Need Your Rockin' Chair"
- 1994 Song of the Year with Jim McBride – "Chattahoochee"
- 1995 Entertainer of the Year
- 2000 Vocal Event of the Year – "Murder on Music Row"
- 2002 Album of the Year – "Drive"
- 2002 Male Vocalist of the Year
- 2002 Entertainer of the Year
- 2002 Single of the Year – "Where Were You (When the World Stopped Turning)"
- 2002 Song of the Year – "Where Were You (When the World Stopped Turning)"
- 2003 Entertainer of the Year
- 2003 Male Vocalist of the Year
- 2003 Vocal Event of the Year with Jimmy Buffett – "It's Five O'Clock Somewhere"
- 2022 Willie Nelson Lifetime Achievement Award

Grammy Awards

- 2002 Best Country Song – "Where Were You (When the World Stopped Turning)"
- 2011 Best Country Collaboration with Vocals- "As She's Walking Away", with Zac Brown Band

ASCAP Awards

- 2014 Country Music Award for Heritage Award

Golden Boot Awards

- 2014 Album of the Year – "The Bluegrass Album"

TNN Music City News Country Awards

- 1990 Song of the Year "Here in the Real World"
- 1991 Star of Tomorrow
- 1991 Album of the Year "Here in the Real World"
- 1992 Single of the Year "Don't Rock the Jukebox"
- 1992 Album of the Year "Don't Rock the Jukebox"
- 1992 Male Artist of the Year
- 1993 Video of the Year "Midnight in Montgomery"
- 1993 Song of the Year "Chattahoochee"
- 1993 Male Artist of the Year
- 1993 Entertainer of the Year
- 1994 Video of the Year "Chattahoochee"
- 1994 Single of the Year "Chattahoochee"
- 1994 Album of the Year "A Lot About Livin"
- 1994 Male Artist of the Year
- 1994 Entertainer of the Year
- 1995 Vocal Collaboration of the Year " A Good Year For the Roses" with George Jones
- 1995 Single of the Year "Livin' on Love"
- 1995 Album of the Year "Who I Am"
- 1995 Male Artist of the Year
- 1995 Entertainer of the Year
- 1996 Male Artist of the Year
- 1996 Entertainer of the Year
- 1997 Male Artist of the Year
- 1997 Entertainer of the Year
- 2001 Video of the Year "WWW.Memory"
- 2001 Song of the Year "Murder on Music Row" with George Strait
- 2001 Single of the Year "Murder on Music Row" with George Strait
- 2001 Album of the Year " When Somebody Loves You"
- 2001 Collaborative Event of the Year "Murder on Music Row" with George Strait
- 2001 Male Artist of the Year

CMT Flameworthy Awards

- 2002 Love Your Country Video of the Year- "Where Were You When the World Stopped Turning"

Other Honors

- 2017: Inducted into the Country Music Hall of Fame
