= Keith Stegall =

American singer-songwriter and record producer

- Birth name: Robert Keith Stegall
- Born: November 1, 1955 (age 69)
- Origin: Wichita Falls, Texas, U.S.
- Genres: Country
- Occupation(s): Singer-songwriter record producer
- Instrument(s): Vocals acoustic guitar keyboard banjo
- Years active: 1980–present
- Labels: Capitol; Epic; Mercury
- Website: keithstegall.com

Robert Keith Stegall (born November 1, 1955) is an American country music recording artist and record producer. Active since 1980, Stegall has recorded two major-label studio albums: 1985's Keith Stegall and 1996's Passages, although he is mainly known for his production work.

== Musical career ==
Robert Keith Stegall was born in Wichita Falls, Texas, in 1955. He performed in local bands, spent a short time in northwestern Louisiana (in the mid-1970s) where he operated a small-time music recording business, then moved to Nashville, Tennessee, at the persuasion of Kris Kristofferson.

Stegall charted thirteen singles on the Billboard Hot Country Songs charts, with the highest-peaking being 1985's "Pretty Lady", a No. 10 hit. Starting in the late 1980s, Stegall has been active primarily as a record producer for several recording acts, most notably Alan Jackson, George Jones, Zac Brown Band, and Clay Walker. Stegall has also written several of Jackson's singles, as well as George Strait's Number one hit "I Hate Everything" and Dr. Hook's "Sexy Eyes".

In 2008, Stegall co-founded the label Bigger Picture Music Group. The label closed in 2014.

In 2016, Stegall launched a Nashville-based production, management, and publishing firm, Dreamlined Entertainment Group, with Scott Miller of Miller Investment Management.

In October 2017, Fangate Music, a label run by Australian country music promoter Rob Potts, in conjunction with Sony Music Australia, announced their partnership with Stegall's Dreamlined Entertainment Group.

== Discography ==
=== Albums ===
Title	Album details	Peak positions
Title	Album details	US Country
Keith Stegall	Release date: April 10, 1985; Label: Epic Records	45
Passages	Release date: February 27, 1996; Label: Mercury Nashville	—
"—" denotes releases that did not chart

=== Singles ===
Year	Single	Peak chart positions		Album
Year	Single	US Country	CAN Country	Album
1980	"The Fool Who Fooled Around"	58	—	—
1981	"Anything That Hurts You (Hurts Me)"	55	—	—
1981	"Won't You Be My Baby"	65	—	—
1982	"In Love with Loving You"	64	40	—
1984	"I Want to Go Somewhere"	25	—	Keith Stegall
1984	"Whatever Turns You On"	19	—	Keith Stegall
1985	"California"	13	11	Keith Stegall
1985	"Pretty Lady"	10	12	Keith Stegall
1985	"Feed the Fire"	45	—	Keith Stegall
1986	"I Think I'm in Love"	36	50	—
1986	"Ole Rock and Roller (With a Country Heart)"	52	48	—
1996	"1969"	43	36	Passages
1996	"Fifty-Fifty"^{A}	75	—	Passages
"—" denotes releases that did not chart

- ^{A}B-side to "1969."

=== Music videos ===
Year	Video	Director
1985	"California"	—
1996	"1969"	Piers Plowden
1996	"Fifty-Fifty"	Piers Plowden
1996	"Roll the Dice"	Piers Plowden
