= The Greatest Hits Collection (Alan Jackson album) =

Compilation album by Alan Jackson
- Released: October 24, 1995
- Recorded: June 26, 1989–May 31, 1995
- Genre: Country
- Length: 66:24
- Label: Arista
- Producers: Scott Hendricks; Keith Stegall

Alan Jackson chronology
| Who I Am (1994) | The Greatest Hits Collection (1995) | Everything I Love (1996) |

Singles from The Greatest Hits Collection
- 1. "Tall, Tall Trees" Released: October 9, 1995; 2. "I'll Try" Released: January 1996; 3. "Home" Released: April 15, 1996

Professional ratings
Review scores
| Source | Rating |
|---|---|
| Allmusic | 5/5 stars |
| Entertainment Weekly | A− |
| Q | 3/5 stars |
| Robert Christgau | (choice cut) |
| The Rolling Stone Album Guide | 3.5/5 stars |

The Greatest Hits Collection is the first compilation album by American country music artist Alan Jackson. Released on October 24, 1995, it includes the greatest hits from his first four studio albums, as well as an album cut from his 1990 debut Here in the Real World and two new tracks — "Tall, Tall Trees" and "I'll Try", both of which were Number One hits for him on the Billboard Hot Country Songs.

The Greatest Hits Collection peaked at #5 on the U.S. Billboard 200 Albums Chart and #1 on the Top Country Albums Chart, becoming Alan Jackson's third #1 country album. In October 2006, the album was certified 6× Platinum by the RIAA.

== Content ==
The Greatest Hits Collection reprises all of Jackson's greatest hits from his first four studio albums. "Here in the Real World", "Wanted", "Chasin' That Neon Rainbow" and "I'd Love You All Over Again" from 1990's Here in the Real World; "Don't Rock the Jukebox", "Someday", "Dallas", "Midnight in Montgomery" and "Love's Got a Hold on You" from 1991's Don't Rock the Jukebox; "She's Got the Rhythm (And I Got the Blues)", "Chattahoochee", "Mercury Blues" and "Who Says You Can't Have It All" from 1992's A Lot About Livin' (And a Little 'bout Love), and "Summertime Blues", "Livin' on Love", "Gone Country" and "I Don't Even Know Your Name" from 1994's Who I Am. The only singles not included on this collection are "Blue Blooded Woman" from Here in the Real World, "Tonight I Climbed the Wall" from A Lot About Livin' (And a Little 'bout Love), and "Song for the Life" from Who I Am.

Two previously unreleased songs are included on this compilation as well. "Tall, Tall Trees", originally recorded by George Jones on his 1958 album Long Live King George, and the newly written "I'll Try". Both of these were released as singles, reaching the top of the Billboard country charts in late 1995 and early 1996, respectively. One song on this compilation, "Home", was previously included on Here in the Real World but was not released as a single until mid-1996, peaking at #3 on the country charts.

== Track listing ==
| Track number | Song | Writer(s) | Length | Year | From the LP |
|---|---|---|---|---|---|
| 01 | "Chattahoochee" (extended mix) | Alan Jackson, Jim McBride | 3:56 | 1993 | Chattahoochee/I Don't Need the Booze (To Get a Buzz On) |
| 02 | "Gone Country" | Bob McDill | 4:19 | 1994 | Who I Am |
| 03 | "She's Got the Rhythm (And I Got the Blues)" | A. Jackson, Randy Travis | 2:23 | 1992 | A Lot About Livin' (And a Little 'bout Love) |
| 04 | "Midnight in Montgomery" | Jackson, Don Sampson | 3:44 | 1991 | Don't Rock the Jukebox |
| 05 | "Tall, Tall Trees" | George Jones, Roger Miller | 2:27 | 1995 | Previously unreleased ^{A} |
| 06 | "Chasin' That Neon Rainbow" | A. Jackson, Jim McBride | 3:05 | 1990 | Here in the Real World |
| 07 | "I'll Try" | A. Jackson | 3:51 | 1995 | Previously unreleased ^{A} |
| 08 | "Don't Rock the Jukebox" | A. Jackson, Roger Murrah, Keith Stegall | 2:51 | 1991 | Don't Rock the Jukebox |
| 09 | "Livin' on Love" | A. Jackson | 3:48 | 1994 | Who I Am |
| 10 | "Summertime Blues" | Jerry Capehart, Eddie Cochran | 3:11 | 1994 | Who I Am |
| 11 | "Love's Got a Hold on You" | Carson Chamberlain, Stegall | 2:53 | 1991 | Don't Rock the Jukebox |
| 12 | "(Who Says) You Can't Have It All" | A. Jackson, Jim McBride | 3:28 | 1992 | A Lot About Livin' (And a Little 'bout Love) |
| 13 | "Home" | A. Jackson | 3:17 | 1990 | Here in the Real World |
| 14 | "Wanted" | Charlie Craig, A. Jackson | 2:57 | 1990 | Here in the Real World |
| 15 | "I Don't Even Know Your Name" | A. Jackson, Ron Jackson, Andy Loftin | 3:49 | 1994 | Who I Am |
| 16 | "Dallas" | A. Jackson, Stegall | 2:43 | 1991 | Don't Rock the Jukebox |
| 17 | "Here in the Real World" | Mark Irwin, A. Jackson | 3:37 | 1990 | Here in the Real World |
| 18 | "Someday" | A. Jackson, Jim McBride | 3:17 | 1991 | Don't Rock the Jukebox |
| 19 | "Mercury Blues" | K. C. Douglas, Bob Geddins | 3:38 | 1992 | A Lot About Livin' (And a Little 'bout Love) |
| 20 | "I'd Love You All Over Again" | A. Jackson | 3:10 | 1990 | Here in the Real World |

^{A}Previously unreleased

== Personnel ==
Tracks 5, 7 & 13 only.

- Eddie Bayers – drums
- Jimmy Capps – acoustic guitar (13)
- Stuart Duncan – fiddle (5, 7)
- Paul Franklin – steel guitar
- Steve Gibson – electric guitar (13)
- Rob Hajacos – fiddle (13)
- Dennis Henson – background vocals (13)
- Roy Huskey Jr. – upright bass (5)
- Brent Mason – electric guitar (5, 7)
- Larry Paxton – bass guitar (13)
- Hargus "Pig" Robbins – piano
- John Wesley Ryles – background vocals (5, 7)
- Jo-El Sonnier – accordion (5)
- Bruce Watkins – acoustic guitar (5, 7)
- Glenn Worf – bass guitar (5, 7)

== Charts ==
=== Weekly charts ===
| Chart (1995) | Peak position |
|---|---|
| Australian Albums (ARIA) | 46 |
| Canadian Albums (RPM) | 14 |
| Canadian Country Albums (RPM) | 1 |
| New Zealand Albums (RMNZ) | 45 |
| US Billboard 200 | 5 |
| US Top Country Albums (Billboard) | 1 |

=== Year-end charts ===
| Chart (1995) | Position |
|---|---|
| US Billboard 200 | 183 |
| US Top Country Albums (Billboard) | 31 |
| Chart (1996) | Position |
| US Billboard 200 | 15 |
| US Top Country Albums (Billboard) | 3 |
| Chart (1997) | Position |
| US Billboard 200 | 128 |
| US Top Country Albums (Billboard) | 18 |
| Chart (2001) | Position |
| Canadian Country Albums (Nielsen SoundScan) | 23 |
| Chart (2002) | Position |
| Canadian Country Albums (Nielsen SoundScan) | 15 |
| Chart (2020) | Position |
| US Top Country Albums (Billboard) | 70 |
| Chart (2021) | Position |
| US Top Country Albums (Billboard) | 50 |
| Chart (2022) | Position |
| US Top Country Albums (Billboard) | 38 |
| Chart (2023) | Position |
| US Top Country Albums (Billboard) | 50 |
| Chart (2024) | Position |
| US Top Country Albums (Billboard) | 56 |
| Chart (2025) | Position |
| US Top Country Albums (Billboard) | 66 |

== Certifications ==
| Region | Certification | Certified units/sales |
|---|---|---|
| Australia (ARIA) | Platinum | 70,000^{^} |
| Canada (Music Canada) | 4× Platinum | 400,000^{^} |
| United Kingdom (BPI) | Silver | 60,000^{‡} |
| United States (RIAA) | 6× Platinum | 6,000,000^{^} |
^{^} Shipments figures based on certification alone.^{‡} Sales+streaming figures based on certification alone.
