= List of songs written by Jim McBride =

Jim McBride has recorded songs that he wrote individually and with the following co-writers: Roger Murrah, Keith Stegall, Charlie Monk, Wayland Holyfield, Stewart Harris, Charlie Craig, Brent Mason, Peter McCann, Guy Clark, Alan Jackson, Steve Dean, Gary Overton, Sam Hogin, Dan Truman, Joy Lynn White, Jerry Salley, Chapin Hartford, Don Cook, Greg Holland, Nelson Larkin, Ken Mellons, Carson Chamberlain, Trace Adkins, Phil Barnhart, Wally Wilson, Bill Anderson, Tammy Cochran, Buddy Jewell, Luke Bryan and Steve Norman.

== All recordings ==
Songs written by Jim McBride can be found on the following sites: AllMusic, Discogs, Genius, Music VF, Second Hand Songs, Songview, a.k.a. ACE (on ASCAP, which reports both ASCAP & BMI songs written by Jim McBride), Spirit Music Group, Wikipedia, Category: Songs written by Jim McBride, and YouTube Playlist. Print references used to help compile this list: the book "Hot Country Songs" by Joel Whitburn, 8th Edition, 1944–2012, and "Definitive Country: The Ultimate Encyclopedia of Country Music and Its Performers" by Barry McCloud and contributing writers.

=== 1970s ===
TITLE	CO-WRITERS	ARTISTS	ALBUM TITLE	RELEASE DATE	LABEL	PEAK CHART POSITIONS			AWARDS
TITLE	CO-WRITERS	ARTISTS	ALBUM TITLE	RELEASE DATE	LABEL	US Billboard	US Billboard	R&R Charts	AWARDS
TITLE	CO-WRITERS	ARTISTS	ALBUM TITLE	RELEASE DATE	LABEL	Hot Country Songs	Hot 100	R&R Charts	AWARDS
"I Just Don't Feel at Home (In Your Arms)"	N/A	The Hagers	"I Just Don't Feel at Home" (A-Side) / "Summer Only Needs Its Autumn" (B-Side)	1972	Barnaby Records	/	/	/	/
"I Just Don't Feel at Home (In Your Arms)"	N/A	The Hagers	The Hagers - Music on the Country Side	1972	Barnaby Records	/	/	/	/
"I Just Don't Feel at Home (In Your Arms)"	N/A	Conny Van Dyke	Conny Van Dyke	1972	Barnaby Records	/	/	/	/
"I Just Don't Feel at Home (In Your Arms)"	N/A	Herman Lee Montgomery		1975	Mega Records	/	/	/	/
"The Cost of Love Is Getting Higher"	Roger Murrah	The Hagers	The Hagers - Music on the Country Side	1972	Barnaby Records	/	/	/	/
"I Might as Well be Home"	N/A	Price Mitchell	"Mr. and Mrs. Untrue" (A-Side) / "I Might as Well be Home" (B-Side)	1975	Prize Records	/	/	/	/
"I Don't Feel Like No Hero Tonight"	N/A	Mickey Gilley	The Songs We Made Love To	1979	Epic / Playboy Records	/	/	/	/
"Mothers and Daddys" (Alt. Title: "Mothers and Daddies")	Roger Murrah	John Wesley Ryles	Let the Night Begin	1979	MCA	/	/	/	/
"Mothers and Daddys" (Alt. Title: "Mothers and Daddies")	Roger Murrah	Mickey Gilley		1979	Epic / Jet / Playboy Records	/	/	/	/
“We Let Love Fade Away”	Roger Murrah	Leon Everette	I Don't Want to Lose	1978	Orlando Records	#89	/	/	/
“We Let Love Fade Away”	Roger Murrah	Leon Everette	I Don't Want to Lose	Jan. 1979	Orlando Records	#89	/	/	/
“I'm Gettin’ Into Your Love”	Roger Murrah	Ruby Falls		Jun-79	50 States	#56	/	/	/
/ Indicates not charting or no award(s)

=== 1980s ===
TITLE	CO-WRITERS	ARTISTS	ALBUM TITLE	RELEASE DATE	LABEL	PEAK CHART POSITIONS			AWARDS
TITLE	CO-WRITERS	ARTISTS	ALBUM TITLE	RELEASE DATE	LABEL	US Billboard	US Billboard	R&R Charts	AWARDS
TITLE	CO-WRITERS	ARTISTS	ALBUM TITLE	RELEASE DATE	LABEL	Hot Country Songs	Hot 100	R&R Charts	AWARDS
"Mothers and Daddys" (Alt. Title: "Mothers and Daddies")	Roger Murrah	Diana Trask		1980	Mercury Records	/	/	/	/
“A Bridge That Just Won't Burn”	Roger Murrah	Conway Twitty	Rest Your Love on Me	Oct. 1980	MCA	#3	/	/	1981 BMI Award
“A Bridge That Just Won't Burn”	Roger Murrah	Conway Twitty	Number Ones	1982	MCA	#3	/	/	1981 BMI Award
“If I Keep on Going Crazy”	Roger Murrah	Mel McDaniel	I'm Countryfied	Nov. 10, 1980	Capitol Records	/	/	/	/
“If I Keep on Going Crazy”	Roger Murrah	Danny Hooper		1981	Saddletramp Records	/	/	/	/
“If I Keep on Going Crazy”	Roger Murrah	Leon Everette	If I Keep On Going Crazy	Feb. 27, 1981	RCA	#11	/	/	/
“If I Keep on Going Crazy”	Roger Murrah	Leon Everette	Leon Everette	1983	RCA	#11	/	/	/
“If I Keep on Going Crazy”	Roger Murrah	Gene Allison	Picture-Disc Rallye Paris-Dakar (Country Hits 3)	1985	Extra Records & Tapes	/	/	/	/
“Houston Blue”	N/A	David Rogers	(single only)	May-81	Karl	#88	/	/	/
“We’re Building Our Love on a Rock”	Roger Murrah	Lou Hobbs		Sept. 1981	Kik	#93	/	/	/
"Ten Years, Three Kids, and Two Loves Too Late"	Roger Murrah	Charlie Louvin		1981	First Generation Records	/	/	/	/
"Ten Years, Three Kids, and Two Loves Too Late"	Roger Murrah	Mel McDaniel	I'm Countryfied	1980	Capitol Records	/	/	/	/
"Ten Years, Three Kids, and Two Loves Too Late"	Roger Murrah	Mel McDaniel	"Take Me to the Country" (A-Side) / "Ten Years, Three Kids, and Two Loves Too Late" (B-Side)	1982	Capitol Records	/	/	/	/
“Bet Your Heart on Me”	N/A	Johnny Lee		Sept. 28, 1981	Full Moon / Asylum	#1	#54	/	/
“Bet Your Heart on Me”	N/A	Johnny Lee	"Bet Your Heart on Me" (A-Side) / "Pickin' Up Strangers" (B-Side)	1981	Asylum	#1	#54	/	/
“Bet Your Heart on Me”	N/A	Johnny Lee	All Star Country Gold (Various Artist)	1982	Sessions Records / Warner Special Products	#1	#54	/	/
“Bet Your Heart on Me”	N/A	Johnny Lee	Country Festival, Vol. 3 (Various Artists)	1982	WEA	#1	#54	/	/
“Bet Your Heart on Me”	N/A	Carter Edwards		1986	RCA / Nicholls N' Dimes Records	/	/	/	/
“Bet Your Heart on Me”	N/A	The Maple Sugar Music Co.	Showdown	1985	Signature Records & Tapes	/	/	/	/
"Shame"	N/A	John Conlee	Busted	1982	MCA	/	/	/	/
“The Perfect Picture (to Fit My Frame of Mind)”	Roger Murrah	Gary Wolf		Oct. 1982	Columbia	#54	/	/	/
"Down in Louisiana"	Keith Stegall	Charley Pride		Aug. 1983	RCA / RCA Victor	/	/	/	/
“This Bed's Not Big Enough”	Charlie Monk	Louise Mandrell	"This Bed's Not Big Enough" (A Side) / "Playing Through the Heart" (B Side)	1983	RCA / RCA Victor	#52	/	/	/
“This Bed's Not Big Enough”	Charlie Monk	Louise Mandrell	Close Up	1983	RCA / RCA Victor	#52	/	/	/
“This Bed's Not Big Enough”	Charlie Monk	Louise Mandrell	I'm Not Through Loving You Yet	Dec. 1984	RCA	#52	/	/	/
"Tender Hearts"	N/A	Louise Mandrell	To Hot Too Sleep	1983	RCA Victor	/	/	/	/
"(Just) Can't Leave That Woman Alone"	Wayland Holyfield	Charley Pride	Night Games	1983	RCA	/	/	/	/
"(Just) Can't Leave That Woman Alone"	Wayland Holyfield	Charley Pride	The Best There Is	1986	RCA	/	/	/	/
"(Just) Can't Leave That Woman Alone"	Wayland Holyfield	Moe Bandy		1985	Columbia	/	/	/	/
"(Just) Can't Leave That Woman Alone"	Wayland Holyfield	Moe Bandy	Keepin' It Country	1986	Columbia	/	/	/	/
“Dixie Boy”	N/A	Alabama	Closer You Get	Mar-83	RCA Records	/	/	/	1983 CMA Awards, The Closer You Get, Album of the Year
“Dixie Boy”	N/A	Alabama	Original Album Classics	2013	RCA / Legacy Records	/	/	/	/
“First Time Burned”	N/A	Johnny Rodriguez	Foolin’ With Fire	Aug. 1984	Epic	#63	/	/	/
“Living Like There's No Tomorrow (Finally Got to Me Tonight)”	Roger Murrah	Keith Whitley	A Hard Act to Follow	1984	RCA	/	/	/	/
“Living Like There's No Tomorrow (Finally Got to Me Tonight)”	Roger Murrah	Keith Whitley		1996	RCA	/	/	/	/
“Living Like There's No Tomorrow (Finally Got to Me Tonight)”	Roger Murrah	John Conlee	American Faces	Nov. 1987	Columbia	#55	/	/	/
“I Wish I Had Loved Her That Way”	Roger Murrah	John Anderson	Eye of a Hurricane	18-Jun-84	Warner Bros.	/	/	/	/
“I Wish I Had Loved Her That Way”	Roger Murrah	Del Reeves		1986	Playback Records	/	/	/	/
"Those Kind of Memories"	Stewart Harris	Waylon Jennings	Turn the Page	1985	RCA	/	/	/	/
"Those Kind of Memories"	Stewart Harris	Waylon Jennings	The Best of Waylon	1988	RCA	/	/	/	/
“Whose Heartache Is This Anyway”	Wayland Holyfield	Reba McEntire	Have I Got a Deal for You	10-Jun-85	MCA	/	/	/	/
“Whose Heartache Is This Anyway”	Wayland Holyfield	Reba McEntire	My Kind of Country / Have I Got a Deal For You	1985	MCA	/	/	/	/
"Tender Heart"	N/A	Al Harrington		1985	South Pacific Man Records	/	/	/	/
"California"	Charlie Craig & Keith Stegall	Keith Stegall	Keith Stegall	1985	Epic	#13	/	/	/
"California"	Charlie Craig & Keith Stegall	Keith Stegall	"California" (A-Side) / "Straight Shooter" (B-Side)	1985	Epic	#13	/	/	/
"California"	Charlie Craig & Keith Stegall	Keith Stegall	I Love New Country (Various Artists)	1988	CBS	#13	/	/	/
"California"	Charlie Craig & Keith Stegall	Keith Stegall	I Love New Country (Various Artists)	1988	(France)	#13	/	/	/
“Don't Make Me Wait on the Moon”	N/A	Shelly West	Don't Make Me Wait on the Moon	1985	Viva Records	#46	/	/	/
"The Best Thing We Could Do Is Say Goodbye"	Brent Mason	Billie Jo Spears	Billie Jo Spears	1986	Dot Records	/	/	/	/
"Lonely Town"	Brent Mason	Jim Ed Brown & The Browns	Jim Ed Brown & The Browns	1986	MCA / Dot Records	/	/	/	/
"Lonely Town"	Brent Mason	Conway Twitty	Borderline	1987	MCA	/	/	/	/
"Do I Have to Say Goodbye"	Peter McCann	Crystal Gayle	Straight to the Heart	1986	Warner Bros.	/	/	/	/
"Do I Have to Say Goodbye"	Peter McCann	Louise Mandrell	Dreamin’	Feb. 1987	RCA	#28	/	/	/
"Do I Have to Say Goodbye"	Peter McCann	Louise Mandrell	Best of Louise Mandrell	1988	RCA Victor	#28	/	/	/
"Do I Have to Say Goodbye"	Peter McCann	Louise Mandrell	Anthology	1998	Renaissance Records	#28	/	/	/
“Guilty Eyes”	Brent Mason	Darlene Austin		Jul-86	CBT	#81	/	/	/
“Heavy Metal (Don't Mean Rock and Roll to Me)”	Guy Clark	Johnny Cash	Johnny Cash is Coming to Town	1987	Mercury Records	/	/	/	/
“Heavy Metal (Don't Mean Rock and Roll to Me)”	Guy Clark	Guy Clark		1988	Sugar Hill Records	/	/	/	/
“Rose in Paradise”	Stewart Harris	Waylon Jennings	Hangin' Tough	1987	MCA	#1	/	#2 (1987)	1988 BMI Country Award
“Rose in Paradise”	Stewart Harris	Waylon Jennings	"Will the Wolf Survive" (A-Side) / "Rose in Paradise" (B-Side)	1987	MCA	#1	/	#2 (1987)	1988 BMI Country Award
“Rose in Paradise”	Stewart Harris	Waylon Jennings	Will the Wolf Survive / Hangin' Tough	1987	MCA	#1	/	#2 (1987)	1988 BMI Country Award
“Rose in Paradise”	Stewart Harris	Waylon Jennings	Number One Hits of the 80's, Vol. 3 by Various Artists	1988	MCA Special Products, Excelsior	#1	/	#2 (1987)	1988 BMI Country Award
“Rose in Paradise”	Stewart Harris	Waylon Jennings	New Classic Waylon	1989	MCA	#1	/	#2 (1987)	1988 BMI Country Award
“Rose in Paradise”	Stewart Harris	Waylon Jennings	Live From Gilley's	1989	Westwood One	#1	/	#2 (1987)	1988 BMI Country Award
"The Crown Prince"	Roger Murrah	Waylon Jennings	Hangin' Tough	1987	MCA	/	/	/	/
"I Know You"	Bud McGuire	Mirinda		1987	Heart Records	/	/	/	/
“I'm a Survivor”	Keith Stegall	George Jones	Too Wild Too Long	1987	Epic	#52	/	/	/
“I'm a Survivor”	Keith Stegall	George Jones	"I'm a Survivor" (A-Side) / "The Real McCoy" (B-Side)	1987	Epic	#52	/	/	/
“I'm a Survivor”	Keith Stegall	George Jones	"I'm a Survivor" (both sides)	1988	Epic	#52	/	/	/
“Chasin’ That Neon Rainbow”	Alan Jackson	Alan Jackson	"Chasin' That Neon Rainbow" (A-Side) / "Short Sweet Ride" (B-Side)	1989	Arista	#2	/	/	1990 CMA Awards, Here in the Real World nominated for Album of the Year
“Short Sweet Ride”	Alan Jackson	Alan Jackson	"Chasin' That Neon Rainbow" (A-Side) / "Short Sweet Ride" (B-Side)	1989	Arista	/	/	/	1990 CMA Awards, Here in the Real World nominated for Album of the Year
“I Was Born with a Broken Heart”	Aaron Tippin	Josh Logan	Somebody Paints the Wall	Sept. 1989	Curb / MCA	#75	/	/	/
“I Was Born with a Broken Heart”	Aaron Tippin	Josh Logan	"I was born with a Broken Heart" (A & B Side)	1989	Curb / MCA	#75	/	/	/
“I Was Born with a Broken Heart”	Aaron Tippin	David Ball	Steppin' Out	Dec. 1989	RCA	/	/	/	/
“She Don't Get the Blues”	Alan Jackson	Alan Jackson	Here in the Real World	1989	Arista	/	/	/	1990 CMA Awards, Here in the Real World nominated for Album of the Year
/ Indicates not charting or no award(s)

=== 1990"s ===
TITLE	CO-WRITERS	ARTISTS	ALBUM TITLE	RELEASE DATE	LABEL	PEAK CHART POSITIONS			AWARDS
TITLE	CO-WRITERS	ARTISTS	ALBUM TITLE	RELEASE DATE	LABEL	US Billboard	US Billboard	R&R Charts	AWARDS
TITLE	CO-WRITERS	ARTISTS	ALBUM TITLE	RELEASE DATE	LABEL	Hot Country Songs	Hot 100	R&R Charts	AWARDS
“Living Like There's No Tomorrow (Finally Got to Me Tonight)”	Roger Murrah	Keith Whitley	The Essential	1996	RCA	/	/	/	/
“California”	Charlie Craig & Keith Stegall	Keith Stegall	Beautiful Country (Various Artists)	1990	CBS (Denmark)	#13	/	/	/
“California”	Charlie Craig & Keith Stegall	Keith Stegall	Grandes Momentos Del Country Baladas Clasicas	1992	CBS / Sony (Spain)	#13	/	/	/
“California”	Charlie Craig & Keith Stegall	Keith Stegall	Les Plus Grands Moments Country - American Ballads (Various Artists)	1993	Columbia (France)	#13	/	/	/
"Do I Have to Say Goodbye"	Peter McCann	Louise Mandrell	Anthology	1998	Renaissance Records	#28	/	/	/
“Rose in Paradise”	Stewart Harris	Waylon Jennings	My Rough & Rowdy Days	1990	MCA Special Products	#1	/	#2 (1987)	1988 BMI Country Award
“Rose in Paradise”	Stewart Harris	Waylon Jennings	Desperados	1995	K-Tel Records	#1	/	#2 (1987)	1988 BMI Country Award
“Rose in Paradise”	Stewart Harris	Waylon Jennings	The Country Music Hall of Fame Presents - Legendary Country Singers	1996	Time Life Music	#1	/	#2 (1987)	1988 BMI Country Award
“Rose in Paradise”	Stewart Harris	Waylon Jennings	The Country Songwriters Hits Showcase #8	1997	The Country Songwriters Hit Showcase	#1	/	#2 (1987)	1988 BMI Country Award
“Rose in Paradise”	Stewart Harris	Waylon Jennings	The Ultimate Collection	1999	BMG Music Australia	#1	/	#2 (1987)	1988 BMI Country Award
“I'm a Survivor”	Keith Stegall	Johnny Paycheck	I'm a Survivor	1996	Sterling Entertainment Group	/	/	/	/
“Chasin’ That Neon Rainbow”	Alan Jackson	Alan Jackson	Here in the Real World	Sept. 1990		#2	/	/	1990 CMA Awards, Here in the Real World nominated for Album of the Year
“Chasin’ That Neon Rainbow”	Alan Jackson	Alan Jackson	Full Steam Ahead	1990		#2	/	/	1990 CMA Awards, Here in the Real World nominated for Album of the Year
“Chasin’ That Neon Rainbow”	Alan Jackson	Alan Jackson	Country Heat	1991	BMG (Canada)	#2	/	/	1990 CMA Awards, Here in the Real World nominated for Album of the Year
“Chasin’ That Neon Rainbow”	Alan Jackson	Alan Jackson	Entertainment Weekly Presents New Country	1992	Warner Special Products / Entertainment Weekly	#2	/	/	1990 CMA Awards, Here in the Real World nominated for Album of the Year
“Chasin’ That Neon Rainbow”	Alan Jackson	Alan Jackson	"Chasin' That Neon Rainbow" (A-Side) / "Midnight in Montgomery" (B-Side)	1993	Arista	#2	/	/	1990 CMA Awards, Here in the Real World nominated for Album of the Year
“Chasin’ That Neon Rainbow”	Alan Jackson	Alan Jackson	America's Dancin'	1993	Sony Music Special Products	#2	/	/	1990 CMA Awards, Here in the Real World nominated for Album of the Year
“Chasin’ That Neon Rainbow”	Alan Jackson	Alan Jackson	Rock the First - Vol. 7 - Country Edition	1993	Sandstone Music	#2	/	/	1990 CMA Awards, Here in the Real World nominated for Album of the Year
“Chasin’ That Neon Rainbow”	Alan Jackson	Alan Jackson	Chartbreakers CD Music Library	1994	Broadcast Programming	#2	/	/	1990 CMA Awards, Here in the Real World nominated for Album of the Year
“Chasin’ That Neon Rainbow”	Alan Jackson	Alan Jackson	The Greatest Hits Collection	1995	Arista	#2	/	/	1990 CMA Awards, Here in the Real World nominated for Album of the Year
“Chasin’ That Neon Rainbow”	Alan Jackson	Alan Jackson	Hey, This Thing Just Might Work. The 5th Anniversary Collection	1995	Arista	#2	/	/	1990 CMA Awards, Here in the Real World nominated for Album of the Year
“Chasin’ That Neon Rainbow”	Alan Jackson	Alan Jackson	Harley Davidson Country Road Songs	Oct. 29, 1996	The Right Stuff	#2	/	/	1990 CMA Awards, Here in the Real World nominated for Album of the Year
“Chasin’ That Neon Rainbow”	Alan Jackson	Alan Jackson	Farther Down the Road, Vol. 51	1998	BMG Special Products / Father Down the Road	#2	/	/	1990 CMA Awards, Here in the Real World nominated for Album of the Year
“Chasin’ That Neon Rainbow”	Alan Jackson	Alan Jackson	High Mileage	1998	Arista Nashville	#2	/	/	1990 CMA Awards, Here in the Real World nominated for Album of the Year
“Short Sweet Ride”	Alan Jackson	Alan Jackson	Here in the Real World	Feb. 27, 1990	Arista	/	/	/	1990 - CMA Awards, Here in the Real World nominated for Album of the Year
“I Was Born with a Broken Heart”	Aaron Tippin	David Ball	David Ball	1994	RCA	/	/	/	
“I Was Born with a Broken Heart”	Aaron Tippin	Aaron Tippin	Single - "I Was Born with a Broken Heart"	1992	RCA	#38	/	/	/
“I Was Born with a Broken Heart”	Aaron Tippin	Aaron Tippin	Read Between the Lines	Oct. 24, 1992		#38	/	/	/
“I Was Born with a Broken Heart”	Aaron Tippin	Aaron Tippin	The Essential Aaron Tippin	1998		#38	/	/	/
"The Road Home"	N/A	Travis Tritt	"I'm Gonna Be Somebody" (A-Side) / "The Road Home (B-Side)	1990	Warner Bros.	/	/	/	/
"The Road Home"	N/A	Travis Tritt	Country Club	1990	Warner Bros.	/	/	/	/
“One Bridge I Didn't Burn”	Steve Dean	Conway Twitty	"One Bridge I Didn't Burn" (A-Side) / "I'm Tired of Being Something (That Means Nothing to You)"	1990	MCA	#57	#91	/	/
“One Bridge I Didn't Burn”	Steve Dean	Conway Twitty	Crazy In Love	May-91	MCA	#57	#91	/	/
“She Don't Get the Blues”	Alan Jackson	Prairie Oyster	Only One Moon	1994	Arista	/	/	/	/
“Just Playin’ Possum”	Alan Jackson & Gary Overton	Alan Jackson	"Dallas" (A-Side) / "Just Playin' Possum" (B-Side) [Albums 72]	1991	Arista	/	/	/	1991- CMA Awards, Don't Rock the Jukebox, nominated for Album of the Year 1992 - TNN Music City News Awards, Don't Rock the Jukebox, Album of the Year
“Just Playin’ Possum”	Alan Jackson & Gary Overton	Alan Jackson	Don't Rock the Jukebox	14-May-91	Arista	/	/	/	1991- CMA Awards, Don't Rock the Jukebox, nominated for Album of the Year 1992 - TNN Music City News Awards, Don't Rock the Jukebox, Album of the Year
“Someday”	Alan Jackson	Alan Jackson	"Someday" (A-Side) / "From A Distance" (B-Side) [Albums 74]	1991	Arista	#1	/	/	1991- CMA Awards, Don't Rock the Jukebox, nominated for Album of the Year 1992 - TNN Music City News Awards, Don't Rock the Jukebox, Album of the Year
“Someday”	Alan Jackson	Alan Jackson	Don't Rock the Jukebox	Aug. 19, 1991	Arista	#1	/	/	1991- CMA Awards, Don't Rock the Jukebox, nominated for Album of the Year 1992 - TNN Music City News Awards, Don't Rock the Jukebox, Album of the Year
“Someday”	Alan Jackson	Alan Jackson	"Love's Got a Hold on You" (A-Side) / "Someday" (B-Side)	1993	Arista	#1	/	/	1991- CMA Awards, Don't Rock the Jukebox, nominated for Album of the Year 1992 - TNN Music City News Awards, Don't Rock the Jukebox, Album of the Year
“Someday”	Alan Jackson	Alan Jackson	The Greatest Hits Collection	1995	Arista	#1	/	/	1991- CMA Awards, Don't Rock the Jukebox, nominated for Album of the Year 1992 - TNN Music City News Awards, Don't Rock the Jukebox, Album of the Year
“That's All I Need to Know”	Alan Jackson	Alan Jackson	Don't Rock the Jukebox	May 14, 1991	Arista	/	/	/	1991- CMA Awards, Don't Rock the Jukebox, nominated for Album of the Year 1992 - TNN Music City News Awards, Don't Rock the Jukebox, Album of the Year
“That's All I Need to Know”	Alan Jackson	Alan Jackson	"Love's Got a Hold on You" (A-Side) / "That's All I Need to Know" (B-Side)	1992	Arista	/	/	/	1991- CMA Awards, Don't Rock the Jukebox, nominated for Album of the Year 1992 - TNN Music City News Awards, Don't Rock the Jukebox, Album of the Year
“Allergic to the Blues”	Alan Jackson	Randy Travis	High Lonesome	Aug. 27, 1991	Warner Bros.	/	/	/	/
“Allergic to the Blues”	Alan Jackson	Randy Travis	Warner Music Canada Promotional DC June 1992 (Vol. 142)	Jun-92	Warner Music Canada	/	/	/	/
“Chattahoochee”	Alan Jackson	Alan Jackson	A Lot About Livin’ (And a Little ‘bout Love)	1992	Arista	#1	#46	/	1993 - ACM Awards -: Single Record of the Year; A Lot About Livin' (And a Little 'bout Love), Album of the Year; AMAs -: Favorite Country Single; A Lot About Livin' (And a Little 'bout Love), Favorite Country Album; CMA Awards -: Single of the Year, Music Video of the Year, & nominated for Song of the Year; A Lot about Livin' (And a Little 'bout Love) nominated for Album of the Year; 1994 - ASCAP Awards, Song of the Year CMA Awards, Song of the Year Grammy's - nominated for Best Country Song
“Chattahoochee”	Alan Jackson	Alan Jackson	Chattahoochee	1992	Arista	#1	#46	/	1993 - ACM Awards -: Single Record of the Year; A Lot About Livin' (And a Little 'bout Love), Album of the Year; AMAs -: Favorite Country Single; A Lot About Livin' (And a Little 'bout Love), Favorite Country Album; CMA Awards -: Single of the Year, Music Video of the Year, & nominated for Song of the Year; A Lot about Livin' (And a Little 'bout Love) nominated for Album of the Year; 1994 - ASCAP Awards, Song of the Year CMA Awards, Song of the Year Grammy's - nominated for Best Country Song
“Chattahoochee”	Alan Jackson	Alan Jackson	"Mercury Blues" (A-Side) / "Chattahoochee" - Club Mix (B-Side)	1993	Arista	#1	#46	/	1993 - ACM Awards -: Single Record of the Year; A Lot About Livin' (And a Little 'bout Love), Album of the Year; AMAs -: Favorite Country Single; A Lot About Livin' (And a Little 'bout Love), Favorite Country Album; CMA Awards -: Single of the Year, Music Video of the Year, & nominated for Song of the Year; A Lot about Livin' (And a Little 'bout Love) nominated for Album of the Year; 1994 - ASCAP Awards, Song of the Year CMA Awards, Song of the Year Grammy's - nominated for Best Country Song
“Chattahoochee”	Alan Jackson	Alan Jackson	The Greatest Music Herd Vol. 19	1993	BMG Music Canada	#1	#46	/	1993 - ACM Awards -: Single Record of the Year; A Lot About Livin' (And a Little 'bout Love), Album of the Year; AMAs -: Favorite Country Single; A Lot About Livin' (And a Little 'bout Love), Favorite Country Album; CMA Awards -: Single of the Year, Music Video of the Year, & nominated for Song of the Year; A Lot about Livin' (And a Little 'bout Love) nominated for Album of the Year; 1994 - ASCAP Awards, Song of the Year CMA Awards, Song of the Year Grammy's - nominated for Best Country Song
“Chattahoochee”	Alan Jackson	Alan Jackson	A Lot About Livin’ (And a Little ‘bout Love)	May 17, 1993	Arista	#1	#46	/	1993 - ACM Awards -: Single Record of the Year; A Lot About Livin' (And a Little 'bout Love), Album of the Year; AMAs -: Favorite Country Single; A Lot About Livin' (And a Little 'bout Love), Favorite Country Album; CMA Awards -: Single of the Year, Music Video of the Year, & nominated for Song of the Year; A Lot about Livin' (And a Little 'bout Love) nominated for Album of the Year; 1994 - ASCAP Awards, Song of the Year CMA Awards, Song of the Year Grammy's - nominated for Best Country Song
“Chattahoochee”	Alan Jackson	Alan Jackson	The Strayhorns - Featuring Alan Jackson	1995	Warner Bros.	#1	#46	/	1993 - ACM Awards -: Single Record of the Year; A Lot About Livin' (And a Little 'bout Love), Album of the Year; AMAs -: Favorite Country Single; A Lot About Livin' (And a Little 'bout Love), Favorite Country Album; CMA Awards -: Single of the Year, Music Video of the Year, & nominated for Song of the Year; A Lot about Livin' (And a Little 'bout Love) nominated for Album of the Year; 1994 - ASCAP Awards, Song of the Year CMA Awards, Song of the Year Grammy's - nominated for Best Country Song
“Chattahoochee”	Alan Jackson	Alan Jackson	The Greatest Hits Collection	1995	Arista	#1	#46	/	1993 - ACM Awards -: Single Record of the Year; A Lot About Livin' (And a Little 'bout Love), Album of the Year; AMAs -: Favorite Country Single; A Lot About Livin' (And a Little 'bout Love), Favorite Country Album; CMA Awards -: Single of the Year, Music Video of the Year, & nominated for Song of the Year; A Lot about Livin' (And a Little 'bout Love) nominated for Album of the Year; 1994 - ASCAP Awards, Song of the Year CMA Awards, Song of the Year Grammy's - nominated for Best Country Song
“Chattahoochee”	Alan Jackson	Alan Jackson	Arista The First 20 Years (Various Artists)	1997	Arista	#1	#46	/	1993 - ACM Awards -: Single Record of the Year; A Lot About Livin' (And a Little 'bout Love), Album of the Year; AMAs -: Favorite Country Single; A Lot About Livin' (And a Little 'bout Love), Favorite Country Album; CMA Awards -: Single of the Year, Music Video of the Year, & nominated for Song of the Year; A Lot about Livin' (And a Little 'bout Love) nominated for Album of the Year; 1994 - ASCAP Awards, Song of the Year CMA Awards, Song of the Year Grammy's - nominated for Best Country Song
“Chattahoochee”	Alan Jackson	Alan Jackson	"I'll Go On Loving You" (A-Side) / "Chattahoochee" (B-Side)	1998	Arista	#1	#46	/	1993 - ACM Awards -: Single Record of the Year; A Lot About Livin' (And a Little 'bout Love), Album of the Year; AMAs -: Favorite Country Single; A Lot About Livin' (And a Little 'bout Love), Favorite Country Album; CMA Awards -: Single of the Year, Music Video of the Year, & nominated for Song of the Year; A Lot about Livin' (And a Little 'bout Love) nominated for Album of the Year; 1994 - ASCAP Awards, Song of the Year CMA Awards, Song of the Year Grammy's - nominated for Best Country Song
“Chattahoochee”	Alan Jackson	Alan Jackson	The Country Line Dance Collection	1998	Pulse Records	#1	#46	/	1993 - ACM Awards -: Single Record of the Year; A Lot About Livin' (And a Little 'bout Love), Album of the Year; AMAs -: Favorite Country Single; A Lot About Livin' (And a Little 'bout Love), Favorite Country Album; CMA Awards -: Single of the Year, Music Video of the Year, & nominated for Song of the Year; A Lot about Livin' (And a Little 'bout Love) nominated for Album of the Year; 1994 - ASCAP Awards, Song of the Year CMA Awards, Song of the Year Grammy's - nominated for Best Country Song
“Chattahoochee”	Alan Jackson	Alan Jackson	Mr. Music Country 08/99 (Various Artists)	Aug. 1999	Mr. Music	#1	#46	/	1993 - ACM Awards -: Single Record of the Year; A Lot About Livin' (And a Little 'bout Love), Album of the Year; AMAs -: Favorite Country Single; A Lot About Livin' (And a Little 'bout Love), Favorite Country Album; CMA Awards -: Single of the Year, Music Video of the Year, & nominated for Song of the Year; A Lot about Livin' (And a Little 'bout Love) nominated for Album of the Year; 1994 - ASCAP Awards, Song of the Year CMA Awards, Song of the Year Grammy's - nominated for Best Country Song
“Chattahoochee”	Alan Jackson	Unknown	The Ultimate Party Mix	1997	Popular Records	/	/	/	/
“Chattahoochee”	Alan Jackson	Sean Kenny	Line Dance Crazy	1997	Hog Wild Records	/	/	/	/
“Chattahoochee”	Alan Jackson	Skipper & Co.	... For Fuld Fart Frem (Denmark)	1998	National Records	/	/	/	/
“(Who Says) You Can't Have It All”	Alan Jackson	Alan Jackson	A Lot About Livin’ (And a Little ‘bout Love)	1992	Arista	#4	/	/	1993 ACM Awards, - A Lot About Livin' (And a Little 'bout Love), Album of the Year AMAs, A Lot About Livin' (And a Little 'bout Love), Favorite Country Album; CMA Awards, A Lot about Livin' (And a Little 'bout Love) nominated for Album of the Year
“(Who Says) You Can't Have It All”	Alan Jackson	Alan Jackson	Chattahoochee	1992	Arista	#4	/	/	1993 ACM Awards, - A Lot About Livin' (And a Little 'bout Love), Album of the Year AMAs, A Lot About Livin' (And a Little 'bout Love), Favorite Country Album; CMA Awards, A Lot about Livin' (And a Little 'bout Love) nominated for Album of the Year
“(Who Says) You Can't Have It All”	Alan Jackson	Alan Jackson	"(Who Says) You Can't Have it All" (A-Side) / "If it Ain't One Thing (It's You)" (B-Side)	1993	Arista	#4	/	/	1993 ACM Awards, - A Lot About Livin' (And a Little 'bout Love), Album of the Year AMAs, A Lot About Livin' (And a Little 'bout Love), Favorite Country Album; CMA Awards, A Lot about Livin' (And a Little 'bout Love) nominated for Album of the Year
“(Who Says) You Can't Have It All”	Alan Jackson	Alan Jackson	A Lot About Livin’ (And a Little ‘bout Love)	Jan. 24, 1994	Arista	#4	/	/	1993 ACM Awards, - A Lot About Livin' (And a Little 'bout Love), Album of the Year AMAs, A Lot About Livin' (And a Little 'bout Love), Favorite Country Album; CMA Awards, A Lot about Livin' (And a Little 'bout Love) nominated for Album of the Year
“(Who Says) You Can't Have It All”	Alan Jackson	Alan Jackson	The Greatest Music Herd - Vol. 24 (Various Artists)	1994	BMG Music Canada	#4	/	/	1993 ACM Awards, - A Lot About Livin' (And a Little 'bout Love), Album of the Year AMAs, A Lot About Livin' (And a Little 'bout Love), Favorite Country Album; CMA Awards, A Lot about Livin' (And a Little 'bout Love) nominated for Album of the Year
“(Who Says) You Can't Have It All”	Alan Jackson	Alan Jackson	The Greatest Hits Collection	1995	Arista	#4	/	/	1993 ACM Awards, - A Lot About Livin' (And a Little 'bout Love), Album of the Year AMAs, A Lot About Livin' (And a Little 'bout Love), Favorite Country Album; CMA Awards, A Lot about Livin' (And a Little 'bout Love) nominated for Album of the Year
“Sawmill Road”	Sam Hogin & Dan Truman	Diamond Rio	Close to the Edge	1992	Arista	#21	/	/	/
“Sawmill Road”	Sam Hogin & Dan Truman	Diamond Rio	"Sawmill Road" (A & B-Side)	1992	Arista	#21	/	/	/
“Sawmill Road”	Sam Hogin & Dan Truman	Diamond Rio	"Sawmill Road" (A-Side) / "I Was Meant to Be With You" (B-Side)	1993	Arista	#21	/	/	/
“Tropical Depression”	Alan Jackson & Charlie Craig	Alan Jackson	A Lot About Livin’ (And a Little ‘bout Love)	1992	Arista	#75	/	/	1993 ACM Awards, - A Lot About Livin' (And a Little 'bout Love), Album of the Year AMAs, A Lot About Livin' (And a Little 'bout Love), Favorite Country Album; CMA Awards, A Lot about Livin' (And a Little 'bout Love) nominated for Album of the Year
“Tropical Depression”	Alan Jackson & Charlie Craig	Alan Jackson	A Lot About Livin’ (And a Little ‘bout Love)	Aug. 1993	Arista	#75	/	/	1993 ACM Awards, - A Lot About Livin' (And a Little 'bout Love), Album of the Year AMAs, A Lot About Livin' (And a Little 'bout Love), Favorite Country Album; CMA Awards, A Lot about Livin' (And a Little 'bout Love) nominated for Album of the Year
"Bittersweet End"	Joy Lynn White & Sam Hogin	Joy Lynn White	Between Midnight and Hindsight	1992	Lucky Dog / Columbia	/	/	/	/
"Bittersweet End"	Joy Lynn White & Sam Hogin	Joy Lynn White	"Cold Day in July'' (A-Side) / "Bittersweet End" (B-Side)	1992	Columbia	/	/	/	/
“If it Ain’t One Thing (It's You)”	Alan Jackson	Alan Jackson	A Lot About Livin’ (And a Little ‘bout Love)	Oct. 6, 1992	Arista	/	/	/	1993 ACM Awards, - A Lot About Livin' (And a Little 'bout Love), Album of the Year AMAs, A Lot About Livin' (And a Little 'bout Love), Favorite Country Album; CMA Awards, A Lot about Livin' (And a Little 'bout Love) nominated for Album of the Year
“If it Ain’t One Thing (It's You)”	Alan Jackson	Alan Jackson	"(Who Says) You Can't Have it All" (A-Side) / "If it Ain't One Thing (It's You)" (B-Side)	1993	Arista	/	/	/	1993 ACM Awards, - A Lot About Livin' (And a Little 'bout Love), Album of the Year AMAs, A Lot About Livin' (And a Little 'bout Love), Favorite Country Album; CMA Awards, A Lot about Livin' (And a Little 'bout Love) nominated for Album of the Year
“Love Builds Bridges (Pride Builds the Walls)”	Jerry Salley	Patty Loveless	"Nothin' But the Wheel" (A-Side) / "Love Builds The Bridges (Pride Builds the Walls)" (B-Side)	1993	Epic	/	/	/	/
“Love Builds Bridges (Pride Builds the Walls)”	Jerry Salley	Patty Loveless	Only What I Feel	April 20, 1993	Epic	/	/	/	/
"Angel of No Mercy"	Chapin Hartford	Collin Raye	Extremes	1993	Epic	/	/	/	/
"Angel of No Mercy"	Chapin Hartford	Collin Raye	"My Kind of Girl" (A-Side) / "Angel of No Mercy" (B-Side)	1994	Epic	/	/	/	/
"Angel of No Mercy"	Chapin Hartford	Collin Raye	Extremes	1994	Epic - (Indonesia, Canada, & Europe)	/	/	/	/
"Southern Justice"	Stewart Harris	Travis Tritt	Ten Feet Tall and Bulletproof	1994	Warner Bros.	/	/	/	/
“What I Meant to Say”	Don Cook & Sam Hogin	Wade Hayes	"What I Meant to Say" (A-Side) / "Kentucky Bluebird" (B-Side)	1994	Columbia	#5	#16	/	1996 BMI Country Award
“What I Meant to Say”	Don Cook & Sam Hogin	Wade Hayes	"What I Meant to Say" (Promo)	1995	Columbia	#5	#16	/	1996 BMI Country Award
“What I Meant to Say”	Don Cook & Sam Hogin	Wade Hayes	Old Enough to Know Better	Oct. 31, 1995	Columbia	#5	#16	/	1996 BMI Country Award
“What I Meant to Say”	Don Cook & Sam Hogin	Wade Hayes	CDX Vol. 120 October 1995 - (Various Artists)	Oct. 1995	Compact Disc Xpress	#5	#16	/	1996 BMI Country Award
“What I Meant to Say”	Don Cook & Sam Hogin	Wade Hayes	Music First (Vol. 4) (Various Artists)	1995	Sony Music Nashville / Columbia / Epic	#5	#16	/	1996 BMI Country Award
“What I Meant to Say”	Don Cook & Sam Hogin	Wade Hayes	John Laws - Country Collection Vol. 4 (Various Artists)	1997	Columbia - (Australia)	#5	#16	/	1996 BMI Country Award
“Hole in the Wall”	Alan Jackson	Alan Jackson	"Summertime Blues" (A-Side) / "Hole in the Wall" (B-Side)	1994	Arista	/	/	/	1994 CMA Awards, Who I Am, nominated for Album of the Year
“Hole in the Wall”	Alan Jackson	Alan Jackson	Who I Am	June 28, 1994	Arista	/	/	/	1994 CMA Awards, Who I Am, nominated for Album of the Year
"Hurts, Don't It"	Greg Holland & Sam Hogin	Greg Holland	Warner Bros. Presents Greg Holland	1994	Warner Bros.	/	/	/	/
"Hurts, Don't It"	Greg Holland & Sam Hogin	Greg Holland	Let Me Drive	1994	Warner Bros.	/	/	/	/
"Hurts, Don't It"	Greg Holland & Sam Hogin	Wade Hayes	"It's Over My Head" (A-Side) / "Hurts Don't It" (B-Side)	1996	Columbia	/	/	/	/
"Hurts, Don't It"	Greg Holland & Sam Hogin	Wade Hayes	On a Good Night	1996	DKC Music / Columbia	/	/	/	/
“If I Had You”	Alan Jackson	Alan Jackson	Who I Am	June 28, 1994	Arista	/	/	/	1994 CMA Awards, Who I Am, nominated for Album of the Year 1995 CMA Awards, Who I Am, nominated for Album of the Year
“If I Had You”	Alan Jackson	Alan Jackson	"I Don't Even Know Your Name" (A-Side) / "If I Had You" (B-Side)	1994	Arista	/	/	/	1994 CMA Awards, Who I Am, nominated for Album of the Year 1995 CMA Awards, Who I Am, nominated for Album of the Year
“The Night Before Christmas”	Sam Hogin & Nelson Larkin	Toby Keith	Christmas to Christmas	1995	Mercury Records	/	/	/	/
“The Night Before Christmas”	Sam Hogin & Nelson Larkin	Alabama	Christmas Vol. II	Sept. 17, 1996	RCA	/	/	/	/
"Where Forever Begins"	Ken Mellons & Carson Chamberlain	Ken Mellons	Where Forever Begins	Nov. 14, 1995	Epic	/	/	/	/
“A House with No Curtains”	Alan Jackson	Alan Jackson	"A House with No Curtains" (Single)	1996	Arista	#18	/	/	1997 CMA Awards, Everything I Love, nominated for Album of the Year
“A House with No Curtains”	Alan Jackson	Alan Jackson	"There Goes" (A-Side) / "A House with No Curtains" (B-Side)	1996	Arista	#18	/	/	1997 CMA Awards, Everything I Love, nominated for Album of the Year
“A House with No Curtains”	Alan Jackson	Alan Jackson	Everything I Love	Jan. 1998	Arista	#18	/	/	1997 CMA Awards, Everything I Love, nominated for Album of the Year
“A House with No Curtains”	Alan Jackson	Alan Jackson	CDX Volume 178, January 1998	Jan. 1998	Compact Disc Xpress	#18	/	/	1997 CMA Awards, Everything I Love, nominated for Album of the Year
“A House with No Curtains”	Alan Jackson	Alan Jackson	Crook & Chase Country Countdown: Show #306 - Feb 7–8, 1998	Feb. 7, 1998	Crook & Chase Country Countdown	#18	/	/	1997 CMA Awards, Everything I Love, nominated for Album of the Year
“A House with No Curtains”	Alan Jackson	Alan Jackson	(various artists)	Feb. 7, 1998	Crook & Chase Country Countdown	#18	/	/	1997 CMA Awards, Everything I Love, nominated for Album of the Year
“A House with No Curtains”	Alan Jackson	Geoff Evans	Another Year On	1998	NONE - (Australia)	/	/	/	/
“A Bad Way of Saying Goodbye”	Trace Adkins & Sam Hogin	Trace Adkins	Dreamin’ Out Loud	June 25, 1996	Capitol	/	/	/	/
“Buicks to the Moon”	Alan Jackson	Alan Jackson	"Who's Cheatin' Who" (A-Side) / "Buicks to the Moon" (B-Side)	1996	Arista	/	/	/	1997 CMA Awards, Everything I Love, nominated for Album of the Year
“Buicks to the Moon”	Alan Jackson	Alan Jackson	Everything I Love	Oct. 29, 1996	Arista	/	/	/	1997 CMA Awards, Everything I Love, nominated for Album of the Year
"A Week in Juarez"	Phil Barnhart & Sam Hogin	Lonestar	Crazy Nights	1997	BNA Records	/	/	/	/
"A Week in Juarez"	Phil Barnhart & Sam Hogin	Lonestar	Crazy Nights / I'm Already There / Let's Be Us Again		Sony Music Entertainment	/	/	/	/
"A Week in Juarez"	Phil Barnhart & Sam Hogin	Lonestar	Crazy Nights / I'm Already There / Let's Be Us Again		(Canada)	/	/	/	/
"Crazy from the Heat"	Sam Hogin & Wally Wilson	Lorrie Morgan	Shackin' Things Up	Aug. 12, 1997	BNA Records	/	/	/	/
"Crazy from the Heat"	Sam Hogin & Wally Wilson	Lorrie Morgan	Mr. Music Country 04/99	1999	Mr. Music	/	/	/	/
"Crazy from the Heat"	Sam Hogin & Wally Wilson	Lorrie Morgan	Mr. Music Country 04/99	1999	(Sweden)	/	/	/	/
“How Do You Sleep at Night”	Jerry Salley	Wade Hayes	Father Down the Road - Vol. 56 (Various Artists)	1997	Sony Music Special Products	#13	#67	/	/
“How Do You Sleep at Night”	Jerry Salley	Wade Hayes	CDX Volume 190 June 1998 (Various Artists)	Jun-98	Compact Disc Express	#13	#67	/	/
“How Do You Sleep at Night”	Jerry Salley	Wade Hayes	When the Wrong One Loves You Right	July 4, 1998	Columbia	#13	#67	/	/
“How Do You Sleep at Night”	Jerry Salley	Wade Hayes	Country Countdown USA: Show #98-38 Weekend of Sept. 19/20, 1998	Sept. 19, 1998	Country Countdown USA	#13	#67	/	/
“Way Too Much Time on My Hands”	Bill Anderson	Bill Anderson	Fine Wine	Aug. 25, 1998	Warner Bros.	/	/	/	/
/ Indicates not charting or no award(s)

=== 2000s ===
TITLE	CO-WRITERS	ARTISTS	ALBUM TITLE	RELEASE DATE	LABEL	PEAK CHART POSITIONS			AWARDS
TITLE	CO-WRITERS	ARTISTS	ALBUM TITLE	RELEASE DATE	LABEL	US Billboard	US Billboard	R&R Charts	AWARDS
TITLE	CO-WRITERS	ARTISTS	ALBUM TITLE	RELEASE DATE	LABEL	Hot Country Songs	Hot 100	R&R Charts	AWARDS
“Rose in Paradise”	Stewart Harris	Waylon Jennings	The Best of Waylon Jennings	May 9, 2000	MCA Nashville	#1	/	#2 (1987)	1988 BMI Country Award
“Rose in Paradise”	Stewart Harris	Waylon Jennings	The Complete MCA Recordings	2004	MCA Nashville	#1	/	#2 (1987)	1988 BMI Country Award
“Rose in Paradise”	Stewart Harris	Waylon Jennings	Ultimate Waylon Jennings	2004	RCA / BMG Heritage	#1	/	#2 (1987)	1988 BMI Country Award
“Rose in Paradise”	Stewart Harris	Waylon Jennings	Nashville Rebel	2006	Legacy	#1	/	#2 (1987)	1988 BMI Country Award
“Rose in Paradise”	Stewart Harris	Waylon Jennings	The Essential Waylon	2007	RCA / Legacy	#1	/	#2 (1987)	1988 BMI Country Award
“Rose in Paradise”	Stewart Harris	Out and Runnin'	Out and Runnin'	2008	NONE	/	/	/	/
“Rose in Paradise”	Stewart Harris	Chris Young & Willie Nelson	The Man I Want To Be	2009	RCA	/	/	/	/
“I'm a Survivor”	Keith Stegall	Johnny Paycheck	Survivor	2001	Bo-Will Enterprises, Inc. / Hitman Records	/	/	/	/
“I'm a Survivor”	Keith Stegall	Johnny Paycheck	Survivor	2001	VooDoo Records (France)	/	/	/	/
“Just Playin’ Possum”	Alan Jackson & Gary Overton	Alan Jackson	Grandes Seccessos	2001 (Europe)	Arista / BMG Brazil	/	/	/	1991- CMA Awards, Don't Rock the Jukebox, nominated for Album of the Year 1992 - TNN Music City News Awards, Don't Rock the Jukebox, Album of the Year
“Just Playin’ Possum”	Alan Jackson & Gary Overton	Alan Jackson	Grandes Seccessos	2002 (Brazil)	Arista / BMG Brazil	/	/	/	1991- CMA Awards, Don't Rock the Jukebox, nominated for Album of the Year 1992 - TNN Music City News Awards, Don't Rock the Jukebox, Album of the Year
“Just Playin’ Possum”	Alan Jackson & Gary Overton	Alan Jackson	Alan Jackson - The Collection	2006	Sony BMG Music Entertainment / Madacy Entertainment	/	/	/	1991- CMA Awards, Don't Rock the Jukebox, nominated for Album of the Year 1992 - TNN Music City News Awards, Don't Rock the Jukebox, Album of the Year
“Just Playin’ Possum”	Alan Jackson & Gary Overton	Alan Jackson	Forever Legends	2006	Sony BMG Music Entertainment Custom Marketing Group / Madacy Entertainment	/	/	/	1991- CMA Awards, Don't Rock the Jukebox, nominated for Album of the Year 1992 - TNN Music City News Awards, Don't Rock the Jukebox, Album of the Year
“Someday”	Alan Jackson	Alan Jackson	Grandes Seccessos	2001 (Europe)	Arista / BMG Brazil	#1	/	/	1991- CMA Awards, Don't Rock the Jukebox, nominated for Album of the Year 1992 - TNN Music City News Awards, Don't Rock the Jukebox, Album of the Year
“Someday”	Alan Jackson	Alan Jackson	Grandes Seccessos	2002 (Brazil)	Arista / BMG Brazil	#1	/	/	1991- CMA Awards, Don't Rock the Jukebox, nominated for Album of the Year 1992 - TNN Music City News Awards, Don't Rock the Jukebox, Album of the Year
“Someday”	Alan Jackson	Alan Jackson	Alan Jackson - The Collection	2006	Sony BMG Music Entertainment / Madacy Entertainment	#1	/	/	1991- CMA Awards, Don't Rock the Jukebox, nominated for Album of the Year 1992 - TNN Music City News Awards, Don't Rock the Jukebox, Album of the Year
“Chattahoochee”	Alan Jackson	Alan Jackson	Grandes Seccessos	2001 (Europe)	Arista / BMG Brazil	#1	#46		1993 - ACM Awards -: Single Record of the Year; A Lot About Livin' (And a Little 'bout Love), Album of the Year; AMAs -: Favorite Country Single; A Lot About Livin' (And a Little 'bout Love), Favorite Country Album; CMA Awards -: Single of the Year, Music Video of the Year, & nominated for Song of the Year; A Lot about Livin' (And a Little 'bout Love) nominated for Album of the Year; 1994 - ASCAP Awards, Song of the Year CMA Awards, Song of the Year Grammy's - nominated for Best Country Song
“Chattahoochee”	Alan Jackson	Alan Jackson	Grandes Seccessos	2002 (Brazil)	Arista / BMG Brazil	#1	#46		1993 - ACM Awards -: Single Record of the Year; A Lot About Livin' (And a Little 'bout Love), Album of the Year; AMAs -: Favorite Country Single; A Lot About Livin' (And a Little 'bout Love), Favorite Country Album; CMA Awards -: Single of the Year, Music Video of the Year, & nominated for Song of the Year; A Lot about Livin' (And a Little 'bout Love) nominated for Album of the Year; 1994 - ASCAP Awards, Song of the Year CMA Awards, Song of the Year Grammy's - nominated for Best Country Song
“Chattahoochee”	Alan Jackson	Alan Jackson	The Very Best of Alan Jackson	June 14, 2004	Arista	#1	#46		1993 - ACM Awards -: Single Record of the Year; A Lot About Livin' (And a Little 'bout Love), Album of the Year; AMAs -: Favorite Country Single; A Lot About Livin' (And a Little 'bout Love), Favorite Country Album; CMA Awards -: Single of the Year, Music Video of the Year, & nominated for Song of the Year; A Lot about Livin' (And a Little 'bout Love) nominated for Album of the Year; 1994 - ASCAP Awards, Song of the Year CMA Awards, Song of the Year Grammy's - nominated for Best Country Song
“Chattahoochee”	Alan Jackson	Alan Jackson	Forever Legends	2006	Sony BMG Music Entertainment Custom Marketing Group / Madacy Entertainment	#1	#46		1993 - ACM Awards -: Single Record of the Year; A Lot About Livin' (And a Little 'bout Love), Album of the Year; AMAs -: Favorite Country Single; A Lot About Livin' (And a Little 'bout Love), Favorite Country Album; CMA Awards -: Single of the Year, Music Video of the Year, & nominated for Song of the Year; A Lot about Livin' (And a Little 'bout Love) nominated for Album of the Year; 1994 - ASCAP Awards, Song of the Year CMA Awards, Song of the Year Grammy's - nominated for Best Country Song
“Chattahoochee”	Alan Jackson	Alan Jackson	16 Biggest Hits	2007	Arista Nashville / Legacy	#1	#46		1993 - ACM Awards -: Single Record of the Year; A Lot About Livin' (And a Little 'bout Love), Album of the Year; AMAs -: Favorite Country Single; A Lot About Livin' (And a Little 'bout Love), Favorite Country Album; CMA Awards -: Single of the Year, Music Video of the Year, & nominated for Song of the Year; A Lot about Livin' (And a Little 'bout Love) nominated for Album of the Year; 1994 - ASCAP Awards, Song of the Year CMA Awards, Song of the Year Grammy's - nominated for Best Country Song
“Chattahoochee”	Alan Jackson	Alan Jackson	Norwegian Favorites	2009	Arista Nashville / Sony Music (Norway)	#1	#46		1993 - ACM Awards -: Single Record of the Year; A Lot About Livin' (And a Little 'bout Love), Album of the Year; AMAs -: Favorite Country Single; A Lot About Livin' (And a Little 'bout Love), Favorite Country Album; CMA Awards -: Single of the Year, Music Video of the Year, & nominated for Song of the Year; A Lot about Livin' (And a Little 'bout Love) nominated for Album of the Year; 1994 - ASCAP Awards, Song of the Year CMA Awards, Song of the Year Grammy's - nominated for Best Country Song
“Chattahoochee”	Alan Jackson	The Sidekicks	Swingin' The Jukebox - The Western Swing Tribute to Alan Jackson	2006	CMH Records	/	/	/	/
“Chattahoochee”	Alan Jackson	Lotta Källström	Red Strings	2008	LK Productions (Sweden)	/	/	/	/
“Chattahoochee”	Alan Jackson	Sheriff & Co.	The Number One (Brazil)	2008	NONE	/	/	/	/
“(Who Says) You Can't Have It All”	Alan Jackson	Alan Jackson	Grandes Seccessos	2001 (Europe)	Arista / BMG Brazil	#4	/	/	1993 ACM Awards, - A Lot About Livin' (And a Little 'bout Love), Album of the Year AMAs, A Lot About Livin' (And a Little 'bout Love), Favorite Country Album; CMA Awards, A Lot about Livin' (And a Little 'bout Love) nominated for Album of the Year
“(Who Says) You Can't Have It All”	Alan Jackson	Alan Jackson	Grandes Seccessos	2002 (Brazil)	Arista / BMG Brazil	#4	/	/	1993 ACM Awards, - A Lot About Livin' (And a Little 'bout Love), Album of the Year AMAs, A Lot About Livin' (And a Little 'bout Love), Favorite Country Album; CMA Awards, A Lot about Livin' (And a Little 'bout Love) nominated for Album of the Year
“(Who Says) You Can't Have It All”	Alan Jackson	Alan Jackson	Super Hits	2007	Sony BMG Music Entertainment Custom Marketing Group	#4	/	/	1993 ACM Awards, - A Lot About Livin' (And a Little 'bout Love), Album of the Year AMAs, A Lot About Livin' (And a Little 'bout Love), Favorite Country Album; CMA Awards, A Lot about Livin' (And a Little 'bout Love) nominated for Album of the Year
“What I Meant to Say”	Don Cook & Sam Hogin	Wade Hayes	100% Country (Various Artists)	2001	Vale Music / Buckaroo - (Spain)	#5	#16	/	1996 BMI Country Award
“Angels in Waiting”	Tammy Cochran & Stewart Harris	Tammy Cochran	Tammy Cochran	Mar. 19, 2001	Epic	#9	#73	/	2001 - ACM Awards, Song of the Year & Video of the Year 2002 - BMI Country Award
“Angels in Waiting”	Tammy Cochran & Stewart Harris	Tammy Cochran	"Angels In Waiting" (Promo)	2001	Epic	#9	#73	/	2001 - ACM Awards, Song of the Year & Video of the Year 2002 - BMI Country Award
“Angels in Waiting”	Tammy Cochran & Stewart Harris	Tammy Cochran	Promo Only Country Radio: March 2001	2001	Promo Only	#9	#73	/	2001 - ACM Awards, Song of the Year & Video of the Year 2002 - BMI Country Award
“Angels in Waiting”	Tammy Cochran & Stewart Harris	Tammy Cochran	CDX Volume 261 March 2001 (Various Artists)	Mar-01	Compact Disc Xpress	#9	#73	/	2001 - ACM Awards, Song of the Year & Video of the Year 2002 - BMI Country Award
“Angels in Waiting”	Tammy Cochran & Stewart Harris	Tammy Cochran	"Love Won't Let Me" (A-Side) / "Angels in Waiting" (B-Side)	2002	Epic	#9	#73	/	2001 - ACM Awards, Song of the Year & Video of the Year 2002 - BMI Country Award
“Angels in Waiting”	Tammy Cochran & Stewart Harris	Tammy Cochran	Totally Country (Various Artists)	Feb. 5, 2002	BNA Records Label	#9	#73	/	2001 - ACM Awards, Song of the Year & Video of the Year 2002 - BMI Country Award
“Angels in Waiting”	Tammy Cochran & Stewart Harris	Tammy Cochran	Mr. Music Country 1/2002	2002	Mr. Music	#9	#73	/	2001 - ACM Awards, Song of the Year & Video of the Year 2002 - BMI Country Award
“Angels in Waiting”	Tammy Cochran & Stewart Harris	Tammy Cochran	Mr. Music Country 1/2002	2002	(Sweden)	#9	#73	/	2001 - ACM Awards, Song of the Year & Video of the Year 2002 - BMI Country Award
“Angels in Waiting”	Tammy Cochran & Stewart Harris	Tammy Cochran	30 Something and Single	2009	IBI Records	#9	#73	/	2001 - ACM Awards, Song of the Year & Video of the Year 2002 - BMI Country Award
“Angels in Waiting”	Tammy Cochran & Stewart Harris	Tammy Cochran	Country Super Hits (Various Artists)	2009	Sony Music Custom Marketing	#9	#73	/	2001 - ACM Awards, Song of the Year & Video of the Year 2002 - BMI Country Award
"The Road Home"	N/A	Travis Tritt	Travis Tritt - Hits	2002	Warner Special Products	/	/	/	/
"There's No New Way Home"	Jerry Salley	Bluegrass Brothers	The Church of Yesterday	2002	Hay Holler Records	/	/	/	/
“The Whiskey and the Wind”	Buddy Jewell	Buddy Jewell	Far Enough Away	Jan. 22, 2002	Self-Released	/	/	/	/
“Allergic to the Blues”	Alan Jackson	Randy Travis	Trail of Memories - The Randy Travis Anthology	2002	Rhino Records	/	/	/	/
“Allergic to the Blues”	Alan Jackson	Unknown	Pickin' On Randy Travis	2003	CMH Records	/	/	/	/
“Bet Your Heart on Me”	N/A	Johnny Lee	The Very Best of Country / Country Roads	2003	Digimode Entertainment Ltd.	#1	#54	/	/
“Living Like There's No Tomorrow (Finally Got to Me Tonight)”		Wildfire	Where Roads Divide	2003	Pinecastle Records	/	/	/	/
“Sawmill Road”	Sam Hogin & Dan Truman	Diamond Rio	Diamond Rio	2003	BMG Special Products	#21	/	/	/
“Hole in the Wall”	Alan Jackson	Alan Jackson	Greatest Hits Volume II (And Some Other Stuff)	2003		/	/	/	1994 CMA Awards, Who I Am, nominated for Album of the Year
“Buicks to the Moon”	Alan Jackson	Alan Jackson	Greatest Hits Volume II (And Some Other Stuff)	2003		/	/	/	1997 CMA Awards, Everything I Love, nominated for Album of the Year
“Buicks to the Moon”	Alan Jackson	Alan Jackson	Super 20 Super Country (Various Artists)	2003	Camden - (South Africa)	/	/	/	1997 CMA Awards, Everything I Love, nominated for Album of the Year
“Buicks to the Moon”	Alan Jackson	The John Gill Band	The Tracks of Our Years 1982 - 2005	2005	NONE - (UK)	/	/	/	/
“Tropical Depression”	Alan Jackson & Charlie Craig	Alan Jackson	Greatest Hits Volume II (And Some Other Stuff)	2003		#75	/	/	1993 ACM Awards, - A Lot About Livin' (And a Little 'bout Love), Album of the Year AMAs, A Lot About Livin' (And a Little 'bout Love), Favorite Country Album; CMA Awards, A Lot about Livin' (And a Little 'bout Love) nominated for Album of the Year
“Tropical Depression”	Alan Jackson & Charlie Craig	Alan Jackson	The Collection	2006	Sony BMG Music Entertainment / Madacy Entertainment	#75	/	/	1993 ACM Awards, - A Lot About Livin' (And a Little 'bout Love), Album of the Year AMAs, A Lot About Livin' (And a Little 'bout Love), Favorite Country Album; CMA Awards, A Lot about Livin' (And a Little 'bout Love) nominated for Album of the Year
“Tropical Depression”	Alan Jackson & Charlie Craig	Alan Jackson	Forever Legends	2006	Sony BMG Music Entertainment Custom Marketing Group / Madacy Entertainment	#75	/	/	1993 ACM Awards, - A Lot About Livin' (And a Little 'bout Love), Album of the Year AMAs, A Lot About Livin' (And a Little 'bout Love), Favorite Country Album; CMA Awards, A Lot about Livin' (And a Little 'bout Love) nominated for Album of the Year
“Tropical Depression”	Alan Jackson & Charlie Craig	Alan Jackson	Songs of Love and Heartache	2009	Music Catalogue Cracker Barrel Old Country Store / Arista Nashville / Sony Music Custom Marketing Group / Sony Music	#75	/	/	1993 ACM Awards, - A Lot About Livin' (And a Little 'bout Love), Album of the Year AMAs, A Lot About Livin' (And a Little 'bout Love), Favorite Country Album; CMA Awards, A Lot about Livin' (And a Little 'bout Love) nominated for Album of the Year
“Tropical Depression”	Alan Jackson & Charlie Craig	Kjell Roos	Nu Börjar Livet	2001	Taton Music	/	/	/	/
“Tropical Depression”	Alan Jackson & Charlie Craig	Ten-4	Country Music	2004	NONE	/	/	/	/
“Tropical Depression”	Alan Jackson & Charlie Craig	Double Barrel	Business as Usual	2008	NONE	/	/	/	/
“Guilty Eyes”	Brent Mason	Darlene Austin	20 Country Hits / Enduring	May 26, 2003	ZYX Music (Germany)	#81	/	/	/
“Heavy Metal (Don't Mean Rock and Roll to Me)”	Guy Clark	Johnny Cash	Johnny Cash is Coming to Town / Boom Chicka Boom	Feb. 18, 2003		/	/	/	/
“Heavy Metal (Don't Mean Rock and Roll to Me)”	Guy Clark	Johnny Cash	Nashville Sessions Vol. 1: Johnny Cash is Coming to Town & Water from the Well of Home	2006		/	/	/	/
"The Crown Prince"	Roger Murrah	Waylon Jennings	The Complete MCA Recordings	2004		/	/	/	/
“I Was Born with a Broken Heart”	Aaron Tippin	Aaron Tippin	Ultimate Aaron Tippin	2004	RCA Nashville / BMG Heritage	#38	/	/	/
“A Hard Secret to Keep”	Jerry Salley	Mark Chesnutt	Savin’ the Honky Tonk	May-05	Vivaton!	#59	/	/	/
“A Hard Secret to Keep”	Jerry Salley	Mark Chesnutt	CDX Volume 366 March 2005 (Various Artists)	Mar-05	Compact Disc Xpress	#59	/	/	/
“A Hard Secret to Keep”	Jerry Salley	Mark Chesnutt	Promo Only Country Radio: May 2005 (Various Artists)	May-05	Promo Only	#59	/	/	/
“A Hard Secret to Keep”	Jerry Salley	Mark Chesnutt	Heard It in a Love Song	2006	CBUJ Entertainment	#59	/	/	/
“Chasin’ That Neon Rainbow”	Alan Jackson	Alan Jackson	Country Six Pack - Red, White & Blue Collar	Sept. 2, 2005	Westwood One - Labor Day Show	#2			1990 CMA Awards, Here in the Real World nominated for Album of the Year
“Chasin’ That Neon Rainbow”	Alan Jackson	Alan Jackson	The Collection	2006	Sony BMG Music Entertainment / Madacy Entertainment	#2			1990 CMA Awards, Here in the Real World nominated for Album of the Year
“Chasin’ That Neon Rainbow”	Alan Jackson	Alan Jackson	16 Biggest Hits	2007	Arista Nashville / Legacy	#2			1990 CMA Awards, Here in the Real World nominated for Album of the Year
“Chasin’ That Neon Rainbow”	Alan Jackson	Alan Jackson	Super Hits	2007	Sony BMG Music Entertainment Custom Marketing Group	#2			1990 CMA Awards, Here in the Real World nominated for Album of the Year
“Chasin’ That Neon Rainbow”	Alan Jackson	Alan Jackson	Collections	2009	Sony BMG Music Entertainment (Russia)	#2			1990 CMA Awards, Here in the Real World nominated for Album of the Year
“Chasin’ That Neon Rainbow”	Alan Jackson	Roger & The Wild Horses	LIve-2-Two	2004	Lion Music (8) (Switzerland)	/	/	/	/
“She Don't Get the Blues”	Alan Jackson	Alan Jackson	Alan Jackson - The Collection	2006	Sony BMG Music Entertainment / Madacy Entertainment	/	/	/	1990 CMA Awards, Here in the Real World nominated for Album of the Year
“She Don't Get the Blues”	Alan Jackson	Alan Jackson	Forever Legends	2006	Sony BMG Music Entertainment Custom Marketing Group / Madacy Entertainment	/	/	/	1990 CMA Awards, Here in the Real World nominated for Album of the Year
“That's All I Need to Know”	Alan Jackson	Alan Jackson	Collections	2006	Sony BMG Music Entertainment (Europe)	/	/	/	1991- CMA Awards, Don't Rock the Jukebox, nominated for Album of the Year 1992 - TNN Music City News Awards, Don't Rock the Jukebox, Album of the Year
“That's All I Need to Know”	Alan Jackson	Alan Jackson	Alan Jackson - The Collection	2006	Sony BMG Music Entertainment / Madacy Entertainment	/	/	/	1991- CMA Awards, Don't Rock the Jukebox, nominated for Album of the Year 1992 - TNN Music City News Awards, Don't Rock the Jukebox, Album of the Year
“That's All I Need to Know”	Alan Jackson	Alan Jackson	Super Hits	2007	Sony BMG Music Entertainment Custom Marketing Group	/	/	/	1991- CMA Awards, Don't Rock the Jukebox, nominated for Album of the Year 1992 - TNN Music City News Awards, Don't Rock the Jukebox, Album of the Year
"He Carried Her Memory"	Jerry Salley	Bradley Walker	Highway of Dreams	2006	Rounder Records	/	/	/	/
“The Car in Front of Me”	Luke Bryan	Luke Bryan	I'll Stay Me	2007	Capitol Records Nashville	/	/	/	/
/ Indicates not charting or no award(s)

=== 2010s ===
TITLE	CO-WRITERS	ARTISTS	ALBUM TITLE	RELEASE DATE	LABEL	PEAK CHART POSITIONS			AWARDS
TITLE	CO-WRITERS	ARTISTS	ALBUM TITLE	RELEASE DATE	LABEL	US Billboard	US Billboard	R&R Charts	AWARDS
TITLE	CO-WRITERS	ARTISTS	ALBUM TITLE	RELEASE DATE	LABEL	Hot Country Songs	Hot 100	R&R Charts	AWARDS
“Rose in Paradise”	Stewart Harris	Waylon Jennings	Chet Atkins - Certified Guitar Player - As Seen on PBS	2010	Digital Row				
“Rose in Paradise”	Stewart Harris	The Pear Ratz	Rat Outta Hell	2010	Self Released	/	/	/	/
“Rose in Paradise”	Stewart Harris	Lonesome River Band	Bridging The Tradition	March 18, 2016	Mountain Home Music Company	/	/	/	/
“Rose in Paradise”	Stewart Harris	Lorrie Morgan & Pam Tillis	Come See Me and Come Lonely	Nov. 10, 2017	Goldenlane Records	/	/	/	/
“Chasin’ That Neon Rainbow”	Alan Jackson	Alan Jackson	34 Number Ones	Nov. 22, 2010	Arista				
“Chasin’ That Neon Rainbow”	Alan Jackson	Alan Jackson	Original Album Classics	2011	Sony Music / Legacy / Arista Nashville (Europe)				
“Chasin’ That Neon Rainbow”	Alan Jackson	Alan Jackson	The Essential Alan Jackson	2012	Arista / Legacy / Sony Music				
“Chasin’ That Neon Rainbow”	Alan Jackson	Alan Jackson	Here in the Real World / Don't Rock the Jukebox / A Lot About Livin' / & Who I Am	2019	BGO Records (UK)				
“Chasin’ That Neon Rainbow”	Alan Jackson	Cool Person	Weird Person	June 9, 2019	Permanent Nostalgia	/	/	/	/
“Someday”	Alan Jackson	Alan Jackson	34 Number Ones	Nov. 22, 2010	Arista				
“Someday”	Alan Jackson	Alan Jackson	Playlist: The Very Best of Alan Jackson	2012	Arista Nashville / Legacy				
“Someday”	Alan Jackson	Alan Jackson	The Essential Alan Jackson	2012	Arista / Legacy / Sony Music				
“Chattahoochee”	Alan Jackson	Alan Jackson	34 Number Ones	Nov. 22, 2010	Arista				Grammy's:
“Chattahoochee”	Alan Jackson	Alan Jackson	The Essential Alan Jackson	2012	Arista / Legacy / Sony Music				nominated for Best Country Song
“Chattahoochee”	Alan Jackson	Alan Jackson	Ultimate Country	2014	Sony Music Commercial Music Group				
“Chattahoochee”	Alan Jackson	Alan Jackson	Genuine - The Alan Jackson Story	2015	Arista Nashville / Legacy				
“Chattahoochee”	Alan Jackson	Alan Jackson	My Favorite Country Songs	2015	Ariola / Sony Music				
“(Who Says) You Can't Have It All”	Alan Jackson	Alan Jackson	34 Number Ones	Nov. 22, 2010	Arista				
“(Who Says) You Can't Have It All”	Alan Jackson	Alan Jackson	The Essential Alan Jackson	2012	Arista / Legacy / Sony Music				
“This Bed's Not Big Enough”	Charlie Monk	Charley Pride	Choices	March 8, 2011	RCA / RCA Victor	/	/	/	/
"Do I Have to Say Goodbye"	Peter McCann	Crystal Gayle	100 Hits Legends - Crystal Gayle	2011	Demon Music Group (UK)				
“She Don't Get the Blues”	Alan Jackson	Alan Jackson	Alan Jackson - Original Album Classics	2011	Sony Music / Legacy / Arista Nashville (Europe)				
“Just Playin’ Possum”	Alan Jackson & Gary Overton	Alan Jackson	Alan Jackson - Original Album Classics	2011	Sony Music / Legacy / Arista Nashville (Europe)				
“Tropical Depression”	Alan Jackson & Charlie Craig	Alan Jackson	Alan Jackson - Original Album Classics	2011	Sony Music / Legacy / Arista Nashville				
“Tropical Depression”	Alan Jackson & Charlie Craig	Alan Jackson	Alan Jackson - Original Album Classics	2011	(Europe)				
“Tropical Depression”	Alan Jackson & Charlie Craig	Alan Jackson	The Perfect Country Collection - 25 Original Albums (Various Artists)	2011	Sony Music / RCA / Columbia / Epic / Arista Nashville / Legacy / RCA Victor				
“Tropical Depression”	Alan Jackson & Charlie Craig	Alan Jackson	The Perfect Country Collection - 25 Original Albums (Various Artists)	2011	(Europe)				
“If it Ain’t One Thing (It's You)”	Alan Jackson	Alan Jackson	The Perfect Country Collection - 25 Original Albums (Various Artists)	2011	Sony Music / RCA / Columbia / Epic / Arista Nashville / Legacy / RCA Victor - (Europe)				CMA Awards, A Lot about Livin' (And a Little 'bout Love) nominated for Album of the Year
“Hole in the Wall”	Alan Jackson	Alan Jackson	Original Album Classics	2011	Sony Music / Legacy / Arista Nashville - (Europe)				CMA Awards, Who I Am, nominated for Album of the Year
“If I Had You”	Alan Jackson	Alan Jackson	Original Album Classics	2011	Sony Music / Legacy / Arista Nashville - (Europe)				
“A House with No Curtains”	Alan Jackson	Alan Jackson	Original Album Classics	2011	Sony Music / Legacy / Arista Nashville - (Europe)				
“A House with No Curtains”	Alan Jackson	Alan Jackson	Genuine - The Alan Jackson Story	2015	Arista Nashville / Legacy				
“A House with No Curtains”	Alan Jackson	Shane Worley	Honky Tonk History	2010	Country Discovery	/	/	/	/
“A House with No Curtains”	Alan Jackson	Johnny Neale & Pam Bailey	Boxcars	2011	Calico Recordings - (UK)	/	/	/	/
"Angel of No Mercy"	Chapin Hartford	Collin Raye	Extremes & I Think About You	2012	SPV Country / Yellow Label - (Germany)				
“Dixie Boy”	N/A	Alabama	Original Album Classics	2013	RCA / Legacy Records	/	/	/	1983 CMA Awards, The Closer You Get, Album of the Year
“I'm a Survivor”	Keith Stegall	George Jones	Too Wild Too Long & You Oughta Be Here With Me	2013	Morello Records (Europe)				
“Allergic to the Blues”	Alan Jackson	Randy Travis	Original Album Series	2013	Warner Bros. Records (Europe)				
“The Night Before Christmas”	Sam Hogin & Nelson Larkin	Alabama	The Classic Christmas Album	2013					
“Love Builds Bridges (Pride Builds the Walls)”	Jerry Salley	Kristy Cox	Living for the Moment	2014	Pisgah Ridge	/	/	/	/
“Heavy Metal (Don't Mean Rock and Roll to Me)”	Guy Clark	Guy Clark	Great American Music Hall, San Francisco 1988	2017	Keyhole - (Cyprus)				
“Living Like There's No Tomorrow (Finally Got to Me Tonight)”	Roger Murrah	John Conlee	Classics 3	2018	Rose Colored Records	#55	/	/	/
"The Road Home"	N/A	Travis Tritt	Blue Collar Man: The Complete Albums 1990-1998 [Albums 67]	2019					
"The Road Home"	N/A	Town Mountain		2019		/	/	/	
“Buicks to the Moon”	Alan Jackson	Cool Person	Weird Person	2019	Permanent Nostalgia	/	/	/	/
/ Indicates not charting or no award(s)

=== 2020s ===
TITLE	CO-WRITERS	ARTISTS	ALBUM TITLE	RELEASE DATE	LABEL	PEAK CHART POSITIONS			AWARDS
TITLE	CO-WRITERS	ARTISTS	ALBUM TITLE	RELEASE DATE	LABEL	US Billboard	US Billboard	R&R Charts	AWARDS
TITLE	CO-WRITERS	ARTISTS	ALBUM TITLE	RELEASE DATE	LABEL	Hot Country Songs	Hot 100	R&R Charts	AWARDS
"I Just Don't Feel at Home (In Your Arms)"	N/A	Johnnie Allan	"It Must Be Love" (A-Side) / "I Don't Feel at Home in Your Arms Anymore" (B-Side)	2020	Jin Records	/	/	/	/
“Living Like There's No Tomorrow (Finally Got to Me Tonight)”	Roger Murrah	Doyle Lawson & Quicksilver	Live in Prague, Czech Republic	2020	Billy Blue Records	/	/	/	/
“Heavy Metal (Don't Mean Rock and Roll to Me)”	Guy Clark	Johnny Cash	The Complete Mercury Recordings 1986 - 1991	June 26, 2020	Mercury - (USA & Europe)				
“Heavy Metal (Don't Mean Rock and Roll to Me)”	Guy Clark	Johnny Cash	Austin City Limits (1/3/87)	2021	Cash Bootleg Series (CBS) - (Europe)				
“I'm a Survivor”	Keith Stegall	George Jones	George Jones - Gold	2020	Crimson (Europe)				
“Chasin’ That Neon Rainbow”	Alan Jackson	Cody Jinks	Red Rocks Live	2020	Late August Records	/	/	/	/
“Chasin’ That Neon Rainbow”	Alan Jackson	Alan Jackson	Austin City Limits Country	2021	Time Life				
“Chattahoochee”	Alan Jackson	Alan Jackson	The Greatest Hits Collection	June 26, 2020	Arista Nashville / Legacy				
"Those Kind of Memories"	Stewart Harris	Waylon Jennings	It's Only Rock & Roll / Never Could Toe The Mark / Turn The Page / Sweet Mother Texas (UK)	2021	BGO Records				
/ Indicates not charting or no award(s)

=== Unknown release date ===
TITLE	CO-WRITERS	ARTISTS	ALBUM TITLE	RELEASE DATE	LABEL	PEAK CHART POSITIONS			AWARDS
TITLE	CO-WRITERS	ARTISTS	ALBUM TITLE	RELEASE DATE	LABEL	US Billboard	US Billboard	R&R Charts	AWARDS
TITLE	CO-WRITERS	ARTISTS	ALBUM TITLE	RELEASE DATE	LABEL	Hot Country Songs	Hot 100	R&R Charts	AWARDS
“Chasin’ That Neon Rainbow”	Alan Jackson	Alan Jackson	Forever Legends	????	Sony BMG Music Entertainment Custom Marketing Group / Madacy Entertainment				
“Chasin’ That Neon Rainbow”	Alan Jackson	Alan Jackson	Seven Bridges Road	????	Flying Cow Records (Europe)				
“Chasin’ That Neon Rainbow”	Alan Jackson	Don Costa	The Fire Still Burns	????	Not on Label	/	/	/	/
“Chattahoochee”	Alan Jackson	Instrumental Karaoke Tape - Unknown	Demonstration Tape (Various Artists)	????	Sound Choice	/	/	/	/
“What I Meant to Say”	Don Cook & Sam Hogin	Wade Hayes	GoldDisc 1170 - (Various Artists)	????	TM Century				
“Buicks to the Moon”	Alan Jackson	Clearwater	Independence Day	????	Self Released	/	/	/	/
"A Week in Juarez"	Phil Barnhart & Sam Hogin	Lonestar	Crazy Nights / I'm Already There / Let's Be Us Again	????	Sony Music Entertainment - (Canada)				
"Jesse Freeman"	Steve Norman	Alice Martin	"Charlie, The Christmas Chimpanzee" (A-Side) / "Jesse Freeman" (B-Side)	????	Kontention Records	/	/	/	/
/ Indicates not charting or no award(s)

== Credits: television, film and YouTube ==
Song / Mention	TV Show, Movie, YouTube Video	ASCAP No.	Year	Other Info	External Video Link	Marker in Video
Jackson thanks McBride	ACM Awards, 26th Annual Awards		1991	Alan Jackson wins Top New Male Vocalist and thanks Jim McBride and more.	https://www.youtube.com/watch?v=KzKVBOMsilM</ref>	56:34
Jackson thanks McBride	TNN Music City News Awards		1992	Don't Rock the Jukebox, Album of the Year winner; Alan thanks Jim McBride and more.	https://www.youtube.com/watch?v=RTSE9GyTMis</ref>	57:47
"Someday"	TNN, This Year in Country Music '93		1993		https://www.youtube.com/watch?v=tmKYzKFL8YU</ref>	12:06
"Chattahoochee"	TNN, This Year in Country Music '93		1993		https://www.youtube.com/watch?v=tmKYzKFL8YU</ref>	31:42
TNN's Music City News Country Songwriter Award	TNN, This Year in Country Music '93		1993	TNN's Music City News Country Songwriter Award	https://www.youtube.com/watch?v=tmKYzKFL8YU</ref>	27:53
"Chattahoochee"	CMA Awards		1993	Sept. 1993, "Chattahoochee" by Alan Jackson (LIVE)	https://www.youtube.com/watch?v=QjqUkcqrjvU</ref>	
"Chattahoochee"	CMA Awards		1993	"Chattahoochee" (Recording), Album of the Year Nomination	https://www.youtube.com/watch?v=5da_wIe3FHs</ref>	24:25
"Chattahoochee"	CMA Awards		1993	Single of the Year Award winner, Jackson thanks Jim McBride and more	https://www.youtube.com/watch?v=5da_wIe3FHs</ref>	40:38
"Chattahoochee"	TNN, Music City News Country Songwriters Awards		1994	"Chattahoochee" by Alan Jackson (LIVE)	https://www.youtube.com/watch?v=eg5MgDlZkIo</ref>	
Medley with "Chasin' That Neon Rainbow" & "Chattahoochee"	American Country Awards		2010	In Las Vegas on FOX, Alan Jackson's (LIVE) medley of his hits include "Chasin' That Neon Rainbow" & "Chattahoochee"; where Jackson received the Greatest Hits Artist Award.	https://www.youtube.com/watch?v=WqsRRiPmF6Q</ref>	
"Chasin' That Neon Rainbow"	Alan Jackson's YouTube Channel - Video Title: Alan Jackson - Alan Jackson Interview - "Early Hits" - 34 Number Ones		2011		https://www.youtube.com/watch?v=x-rRhnJHBRM</ref>	
"Chattahoochee"	Tim & Willy on KMLE Country Radio 108		2012	interview with Alan Jackson, mentions "Chattahoochee"	https://www.youtube.com/watch?v=FEYMk5fmR84</ref>	
"Chattahoochee"	YouTube - Georgia Country		2017	Alan Jackson accepts his Medallion and Induction into the Nashville Country Music Hall of Fame and mentions "Chattahoochee".	https://www.youtube.com/watch?v=Q9WvIgF5Dqs</ref>	
"Chattahoochee"	53rd Annual Academy of Country Music Awards		2018	Part of the show called "ACM Flashbacks" honoring classic country hits from 1993. "Chattahoochee" performed by Alan Jackson and Jon Pardi.	https://www.dickclark.com/news/superstar-collaborations-announced-for-the-53rd-acm-awards/</ref>	
"Chasin' That Neon Rainbow"	CMT, YouTube Channel - Video Title: Alan Jackson’s Journey To Country Music Stardom | Hot 20 | CMT		2020		https://www.youtube.com/watch?v=QVp1tEsu4dc</ref>	1:24
"Chattahoochee"	The Bobby Bones Show, (on iHeartRadio & YouTube) - Video Title: Alan Jackson On Songwriting		2021	Singing At His Wedding, And His Hit Songs; the writing of "Chattahoochee" with Jim McBride talked about.	https://www.youtube.com/watch?v=zbQkXA7mLoA</ref>	
"Chattahoochee"	1996 Olympics	9168	1996			
"Chattahoochee"	1994 Grammy Awards	335730	1994			
"Chattahoochee"	21st AMA Awards	323098	1994	Nomination only. Alan wasn't there to accept it.	https://www.youtube.com/watch?v=zbQkXA7mLoA</ref>	
"Chattahoochee"	2018 Outback Bowl	4208788	2018			
"Chattahoochee"	27th CMA Awards	308292				
"Chattahoochee"	28th ACM Awards	321339				
"Chattahoochee"	29th ACM Awards	332663				
"Chattahoochee"	35th ACM Awards	845323				
"Angels In Waiting"	36th ACM Awards	975267				
"Chattahoochee"	36th Grammy Awards	335730				
"Angels In Waiting"	37th ACM Awards	1142929				
"Chattahoochee"	40th CMA Awards	687192				
"Chattahoochee"	53rd ACM Awards	3769604				
"Chattahoochee"	40th ACM Awards	1620804				
"Chattahoochee"	40th ACM Awards	1618401				
"Angels In Waiting"	2002 ACM Red Carpet	1437256				
"Chattahoochee"	2003 ACM Awards	1415762				
"Chattahoochee"	2014 Superstar US	2963585		Lorrie Morgan and Pam Tillis		
"Bet Your Heart On Me"	1995 As The World Turns	292515				
"Chattahoochee"	2003 CBS MLB	1344670		Detroit vs Yankees		
"Chattahoochee"	2003 CBS MLB	1344603		Seattle vs Yankees		
"Chattahoochee"	2003 CBS MLB	1334354		Tampa Bay vs Yankees		
"Chasin' That Neon Rainbow"	CBS Sunday Morning News	3060659				
"Rose In Paradise"	Chet Atkins Certified Guitar Player	2190472		Cinemax Special		
"Rose In Paradise"	Chet Atkins Certified Guitar Player	3872049		Cinemax Special		
"Chattahoochee"	1993 Disney's Countdown to Kids Day	328503				
"Chattahoochee"	E! News Daily	400459				
"Chasin' That Neon Rainbow"	Entertainment Tonight	202146	1991			
"Chattahoochee"	Entertainment Tonight	180633	1991			
"Rose In Paradise"	Entertainment Tonight	180595				
"Someday"	Entertainment Tonight	202291				
"Chattahoochee"	1996 Espy Awards	395136				
"Chattahoochee"	1994 Extra Extra	400673				
"California"	1994 Extra Extra	338045				
"Short Sweet Ride"	1995 Extra Extra	459993				
"Chattahoochee"	Fox & Friends	3196454				
"Chattahoochee"	Fox & Friends	3442902				
"Chasin' That Neon Rainbow"	Fox & Friends	2755523	2014			
"Chattahoochee"	Hannity	2981643	2015			
"I Was Born With A Broken Heart"	Hee Haw	195576	1992			
"Someday"	Hee Haw	195570				
"How Do You Sleep At Night"	Live From The Bluebird Café	1587657	2000			
"Chasin' That Neon Rainbow"	Live From The Bluebird Café	1343822	2004			
"Rose In Paradise"	Live From The Bluebird Café	343823	2003			
"I Was Born With A Broken Heart"	Maury Povich	180819	1996			
"Down In Louisiana"	Nashville Now	229361	1991			
"Chattahoochee"	NBA AllStar Weekend	1262574	2003			
"Just Playin' Possum"	Regis and Kathy Lee	187005				
"Chattahoochee"	Public Eye w/ Bryant Gumbel	615479				
"Someday"	Regis and Kathy Lee	186910	1991			
"Angels In Waiting"	Nashville TV Show	1039441	2014	Episode 301 "That's Me Without You"		
"Chattahoochee"	The Five	7079736	2021			
"Chattahoochee"	The Today Show	3332557	1995			
"I Was Born With A Broken Heart"	Vicki	225390	1992			
"Chattahoochee"	W "The Movie"	2077966	2008			
"Chattahoochee"	World News Now	861726	1996			
"Who Says You Can't Have It All"	TNN Country News	214864	1993			
"Tropical Depression"	TNN Country News	327318	1994			
"A Bridge That Just Won't Burn"	TNN Country News	327446	1994			
"Chasin' That Neon Rainbow"	TNN Country News	327434	1994			
"Who Says You Can't Have It All"	TNN Country News	327451	1994			
"What I Meant To Say"	TNN Country News	356734	1995			
"Someday"	TNN Country News	356840	1995			
"Where Forever Begins"	TNN Country News	403274	1995			
