= I Would Like to See You Again =

Studio album by Johnny Cash
- Released: April 10, 1978
- Recorded: July 6, 1976–October 4, 1977
- Studio: Sound Spectrum
- Genre: Country; outlaw country
- Length: 32:44
- Label: Columbia
- Producer: Larry Butler

Johnny Cash chronology
The Rambler (1977)	I Would Like to See You Again (1978)	Greatest Hits, Vol. 3 (1978)

Singles from I Would Like to See You Again
- 1. "I Would Like to See You Again" Released: 1978; 2. "There Ain't No Good Chain Gang" / "I Wish I Was Crazy Again" Released: 1978

I Would Like to See You Again is an album by American country singer Johnny Cash, released on Columbia Records in 1978. The title track peaked at No. 12 on the singles chart, while "There Ain't No Good Chain Gang" reached No. 2; the album peaked at No. 23. The album features a pair of duets with Waylon Jennings, one of which was the "There Ain't No Good Chain Gang" single; it was one of Cash's first collaborations with Jennings, and the two recorded songs together throughout the 1980s, including a separate album entitled Heroes. Cash and Jennings would also work together as the Highwaymen with Willie Nelson and Kris Kristofferson.

== Critical reception ==
Professional ratings
Review scores
Source	Rating
AllMusic	2.5/5 stars

Rolling Stone noted that, "in current country terminology, this outsider has become an Outlaw, and Cash, in keeping with the new secular faith, strips his sound to a lean roar, writes a few hard-boiled stories ripe with romantic agonies and enjoins Waylon Jennings, country music's Incredible Hulk, to glower along on a couple of songs."

== Track listing ==
No.	Title	Writer(s)	Length
1.	"I Would Like to See You Again"	Larry Atwood, Charlie Craig	2:55
2.	"Lately"	Cash	2:01
3.	"I Wish I Was Crazy Again" (with Waylon Jennings)	Bob McDill	2:44
4.	"Who's Gene Autry?"	Cash	3:53
5.	"Hurt So Bad"	Cash	2:37
6.	"I Don't Think I Could Take You Back Again"	Earl Poole Ball, Jo-El Sonnier	2:51
7.	"Abner Brown"	Cash	3:40
8.	"After Taxes"	Jerry Leiber, Billy Edd Wheeler	3:03
9.	"There Ain't No Good Chain Gang" (with Waylon Jennings)	Hal Bynum, David Kirby	3:18
10.	"That's the Way It Is"	Roger Bowling, Larry Butler	3:03
11.	"I'm Alright Now"	Jerry Hensley	2:39

== Personnel ==
- Johnny Cash - vocals, guitar
- Waylon Jennings - vocals and electric guitar on "I Wish I Was Crazy Again" and "There Ain't No Good Chain Gang"
- Bob Wootton, Jerry Hensley, Jack Routh, Jimmy Capps, Jerry Shook, Pete Wade - guitar
- Marshall Grant, Gordon Payne - bass
- WS Holland - drums
- Ralph Mooney - steel guitar
- Larry McCoy, Cliff Robertson, Earl Poole Ball - piano
- Terry McMillan - harmonica
- Farrell Morris - percussion
- The Jordanaires - vocals
- John Carter Cash - question on "Who's Gene Autry?"

Additional personnel

- Produced by Larry Butler
- "I Wish I Was Crazy Again" and "There Ain't No Good Chain Gang" produced by Johnny Cash and Waylon Jennings
- Engineers: Roger Tucker, Billy Sherrill
- Recorded at Sound Spectrum Recording, Inc.
- Mixed at Jack Clement Recording Studio
- Johnny Cash cover photo by Alexander Agor
- "Vision" photo of June Carter by Johnny Cash
- Liner Notes by Larry Butler

== Charts ==
Album - Billboard (United States)

Year	Chart	Position
1978	Country Albums	23

Singles - Billboard (United States)

Year	Single	Chart	Position
1978	"I Would Like to See You Again"	Country Singles	12
1978	"There Ain't No Good Chain Gang"	Country Singles	2
1978	"I Wish I Was Crazy Again"	Country Singles	22
