= I Would Like to See You Again (song) =

Song by Johnny Cash

Single by Johnny Cash

from the album I Would Like to See You Again
- A-side: "I Would Like to See You Again" "Lately"
- Released: 1978
- Genre: country
- Label: Columbia 3-10681
- Songwriters: Charlie Craig, Larry Atwood
- Producer: Larry Butler

Johnny Cash singles chronology
"After the Ball" (1977)	"I Would Like to See You Again" (1978)	"There Ain't No Good Chain Gang" / "I Wish I Was Crazy Again" (1978)

Audio
- "I Would Like to See You Again" on YouTube

"I Would Like to See You Again" is a song written by Charlie Craig and Larry Atwood.

Kenny Rogers recorded it for his first solo album Love Lifted Me, produced by Larry Butler for United Artists Records.

The album, released in 1976, turned out, according to Kenny Rogers himself, "pretty much enevenful", yet, as C. Eric Banister put it in his book Johnny Cash FAQ: All That's Left to Know About the Man in Black, "it included several decent songs, one of which was 'I Would Like to See You Again'" that would later be covered by Johnny Cash.

Another known version of this song is by Del Reeves, it is included on his 1975 album With Strings and Things, produced by Butler as well.

Another cover was done by Don Williams. It was released as a B-side to his hit single "Lay Down Beside Me" in March 1979, and was the opening track for his 1978 album, Expressions.

== Johnny Cash version ==
Cash's version gave its title to his Larry-Butler-produced album I Would Like to See You Again, released in April 1978.

It is a "thoughtful, nostalgic ballad".

Put out as a single (Columbia 3-10681, with "Lately" on the opposite side) from the upcoming album in February or March 1978, the song spent 13 weeks on U.S. Billboard's country chart, reaching number 12.

== Track listing ==
7" single (Columbia 3-10681, 1978)
No.	Title	Writer(s)	Length
1.	"I Would Like to See You Again"	C. Craig – L. Atwood	2:51
2.	"Lately"	J. R. Cash	1:58

== Charts ==
Chart (1978)	Peak position
US Hot Country Songs (Billboard)	12
