= Home (Alan Jackson song) =

Single by Alan Jackson

from the album The Greatest Hits Collection
- B-side: "I'll Try"
- Released: April 15, 1996
- Genre: Country
- Length: 3:18
- Label: Arista
- Songwriter: Alan Jackson
- Producer: Keith Stegall

Alan Jackson singles chronology
"I'll Try" (1996)	"Home" (1996)	"Little Bitty" (1996)

"Home" is a song written and recorded by American country music artist Alan Jackson. The song was originally recorded for his 1990 debut album Here in the Real World. The original 1989 recording served as the B-side to three of Jackson's singles: his debut single "Blue Blooded Woman", as well as his first two Number One hits "I'd Love You All Over Again" and "Don't Rock the Jukebox."

Jackson included "Home" in his first Greatest Hits package, The Greatest Hits Collection, in 1995. The song served as the B-side to that album's first two singles, "Tall, Tall Trees" and "I'll Try" before it was issued in 1996 as the album's third single. In mid-1996, "Home" reached a peak of number 3 on the Billboard Hot Country Singles & Tracks (now Hot Country Songs) charts.

== Content ==
It is a moderate up-tempo song in which Jackson recalls his and his parents' upbringing as children in the state of Georgia. Jackson said it was written the first month he moved to Nashville because he was homesick.

== Critical reception ==
Deborah Evans Price, of Billboard magazine reviewed the song favorably, calling it a "loving tribute to Jackson's parents and the home they provided." She goes on to say that "in the hands of a lesser, artist this type of song could easily disintegrate into sticky sentimentality, but that is definitely not the case here. Honest and heartfelt emotion makes for powerful communication, and the straightforward sincerity in Jackson's voice makes this tune a homespun masterpiece."

== Chart positions ==
"Home" debuted at number 67 on the U.S. Billboard Hot Country Singles & Tracks for the week of April 20, 1996.

Chart (1996)	Peak position
Canada Country Singles (RPM)	4
US Hot Country Songs (Billboard)	3

=== Year-end charts ===
Chart (1996)	Position
Canada Country Tracks (RPM)	27
US Country Songs (Billboard)	17
