= I Wish I Was Crazy Again =

Song by Johnny Cash and Waylon Jennings

Single by Johnny Cash and Waylon Jennings

from the album I Would Like to See You Again
- A-side: "There Ain't No Good Chain Gang"
- B-side: "I Wish I Was Crazy Again"
- Released: 1978
- Genre: country
- Label: Columbia 3-10742
- Songwriter: Bob McDill

Johnny Cash and Waylon Jennings singles chronology
"After the Ball" (1977)	"There Ain't No Good Chain Gang" / "I Wish I Was Crazy Again" (1978)	"Gone Girl" (1978)

Audio
- "I Wish I Was Crazy Again" on YouTube

"I Wish I Was Crazy Again" is a song written by Bob McDill and introduced by the duet of Johnny Cash and Waylon Jennings on Cash's 1978 album I Would Like to See You Again.

Two Cash and Jennings' duets from that album, "There Ain't No Good Chain Gang" and "I Wish I Was Crazy Again", were coupled together for a single release. "There Ain't No Good Chain Gang" peaked at number 2 on U.S. Billboard's country chart for two weeks in July of that year, while "Wish I Was Crazy Again" peaked at number 22 a year and a half later, for two weeks of January 1980.

== Track listing ==
7" single (Columbia 3-10742, 1978)
No.	Title	Writer(s)	Length
1.	"There Ain't No Good Chain Gang"	H. Bynum, D. Kirby	3:15
2.	"I Wish I Was Crazy Again"	B. McDill	2:41

== Charts ==
Chart (1979–1980)	Peak position
US Hot Country Songs (Billboard)	22
