= Here in the Real World =

1990 album by Alan Jackson

Studio album by Alan Jackson
- Released: February 27, 1990
- Recorded: June 1989
- Studio: Omnisound Recording and Nightingale Studios, Nashville, TN
- Genre: Neotraditional country
- Length: 29:50
- Label: Arista
- Producer: Scott Hendricks; Keith Stegall

Alan Jackson chronology
| New Traditional (1987) | Here in the Real World (1990) | Don't Rock the Jukebox (1991) |

Singles from Here in the Real World
- 1. "Blue Blooded Woman" Released: September 1989; 2. "Here in the Real World" Released: January 15, 1990; 3. "Wanted" Released: May 28, 1990; 4. "Chasin' That Neon Rainbow" Released: September 1990; 5. "I'd Love You All Over Again" Released: January 7, 1991

Professional ratings
Review scores
| Source | Rating |
|---|---|
| AllMusic | 4/5 stars |
| Entertainment Weekly | B |
| Q | 3/5 stars |
| The Rolling Stone Album Guide | 2/5 stars |

Here in the Real World is the debut studio album by American country music artist Alan Jackson. It was released on February 27, 1990, and produced five singles: "Blue Blooded Woman", "Here in the Real World", "Wanted", "Chasin' That Neon Rainbow", and "I'd Love You All Over Again", Jackson's first No. 1 hit.

The track "Home" served as the B-side for several of Jackson's later singles, before he re-released the song in 1995 for his The Greatest Hits Collection album, and finally issued it as a single in 1996. The track "Ace of Hearts" was later recorded by Mark Wills for his self-titled debut album in 1996.

== Track listing ==
| No. | Title | Writer(s) | Length |
|---|---|---|---|
| 1. | "Ace of Hearts" | Carson Chamberlain, Ron Moore, Lonnie Wilson | 3:06 |
| 2. | "Here in the Real World" | Mark Irwin, Alan Jackson | 3:36 |
| 3. | "Blue Blooded Woman" | Jackson, Roger Murrah, Keith Stegall | 2:14 |
| 4. | "Wanted" | Jackson, Charlie Craig | 2:56 |
| 5. | "Chasin' That Neon Rainbow" | Jackson, Jim McBride | 3:06 |
| 6. | "She Don't Get the Blues" | Jackson, McBride | 2:46 |
| 7. | "I'd Love You All Over Again" | Jackson | 3:11 |
| 8. | "Dog River Blues" | Jackson | 2:20 |
| 9. | "Home" | Jackson | 3:18 |
| 10. | "Short Sweet Ride" | Jackson, McBride | 2:29 |

== Personnel ==
- Alan Jackson – lead vocals, backing vocals
- Eddie Bayers – drums
- Harold Bradley – six-string bass guitar
- Jimmy Capps – acoustic guitar
- Paul Franklin – steel guitar
- Steve Gibson – electric guitar
- Rob Hajacos – fiddle
- Dennis Henson – backing vocals
- Roy Huskey Jr. – upright bass
- Brent Mason – electric guitar
- Weldon Myrick – steel guitar
- Larry Paxton – bass guitar
- Dave Pomeroy – bass guitar
- Hargus "Pig" Robbins – piano
- Keith Stegall – backing vocals
- Bruce Watkins – acoustic guitar

== Charts ==
=== Weekly charts ===
| Chart (1990) | Peak position |
|---|---|
| US Billboard 200 | 57 |
| US Top Country Albums (Billboard) | 4 |

=== Year-end charts ===
| Chart (1990) | Position |
|---|---|
| US Top Country Albums (Billboard) | 12 |
| Chart (1991) | Position |
| US Top Country Albums (Billboard) | 5 |
| Chart (1992) | Position |
| US Top Country Albums (Billboard) | 47 |

== Certifications ==
Certifications for Here in the Real World
| Region | Certification | Certified units/sales |
|---|---|---|
| Canada (Music Canada) | 2× Platinum | 200,000^{^} |
| United States (RIAA) | 2× Platinum | 2,000,000^{^} |
^{^} Shipments figures based on certification alone.
