= Tall, Tall Trees =

1995 single by Alan Jackson

Single by George Jones

from the album Long Live King George
- A-side: "Hearts in My Dream"
- Released: August 26, 1957
- Genre: Country
- Length: 2:29
- Label: Mercury
- Songwriters: George Jones, Roger Miller
- Producer: Pappy Daily

George Jones singles chronology
"Too Much Water" (1957)	"Tall, Tall Trees" (1957)	"Cup of Loneliness" (1957)

"Tall, Tall Trees" is a song co-written by American singers George Jones and Roger Miller. Jones first released the song in 1957 as the B-side to his "Hearts in My Dream" single. Miller released his version on his 1970 album A Trip in the Country.

== Other recordings ==
"Tall, Tall Trees"

Single by Alan Jackson

from the album The Greatest Hits Collection
- B-side: "Home" (7")
- Released: October 9, 1995
- Recorded: May 31, 1995
- Genre: Country
- Length: 2:28
- Label: Arista Nashville 12879
- Songwriters: George Jones; Roger Miller
- Producer: Keith Stegall

Alan Jackson singles chronology
"I Don't Even Know Your Name" (1995)	"Tall, Tall Trees" (1995)	"I'll Try" (1996)

The most famous and commercially successful recording was released by Alan Jackson in October 1995 on a single in conjunction with his 1995 compilation album The Greatest Hits Collection. Jackson's cover was his twelfth Number One hit on the Billboard country charts.

== Content ==
The song is an up-tempo track in which the narrator promises to his significant other that he will give her anything she desires, whether it be a "big limousine", a "great big mansion", or "tall, tall trees and all the water in the seas".

In the liner notes for his Greatest hits album, Jackson wrote,"This is an old Roger Miller song I stumbled across. It's a real fun song with a Cajun feel. I've always been a big fan of Roger's and when it came time to record a couple of new songs for this greatest hits, I couldn't resist. After I recorded it, we found out that George Jones is a co-writer - I think George had even forgotten he'd written it. I'm proud to have the chance to record a song written by two of my favorites."

== Critical reception ==
Deborah Evans Price, of Billboard magazine reviewed the song favorably, saying that Jackson's vocal "evokes the right combination of devotion and playfulness on this tune about a man who promises his love everything from a big mansion to tall, tall trees."

== Music video ==
The music video was directed and produced by Sherman Halsey and premiered in October 1995 on CMT. It features a barefoot woman (played by actress Monica Potter) in a white room watching screenshots of Jackson and his band playing in a black room. Throughout the video appears a random guy who tries to woo her. Near the end of the video a boy dressed like a cowboy gives the woman a peanut butter sandwich already bitten by the boy and she takes a bite but then leaves it on the chair, and then at the very end of the video, Jackson comes into the room and finds the sandwich on the chair, takes it, and walks away eating it.

== Charts ==
"Tall, Tall Trees" debuted at number 51 on the U.S. Billboard Hot Country Singles & Tracks for the week of October 21, 1995.

Chart (1995)	Peak position
Canada Country Singles (RPM)	1
US Hot Country Songs (Billboard)	1

=== Year-end charts ===
Chart (1995)	Position
Canada Country Tracks (RPM)	62

== Certifications ==
Certifications for Tall, Tall Trees
Region	Certification	Certified units/sales
United States (RIAA)	Gold	500,000^{‡}
^{‡} Sales+streaming figures based on certification alone.
