= I'll Try =

Single by Alan Jackson

from the album The Greatest Hits Collection
- B-side: "Home"
- Released: January 1996
- Recorded: May 31, 1995
- Genre: Country
- Length: 3:51
- Label: Arista Nashville
- Songwriter: Alan Jackson
- Producer: Keith Stegall

Alan Jackson singles chronology
"Tall, Tall Trees" (1995)	"I'll Try" (1996)	"Home" (1996)

"I'll Try" is a song written and recorded by American country music artist Alan Jackson. It was released in January 1996 as the second single from his 1995 compilation album The Greatest Hits Collection. Like "Tall, Tall Trees" (the other newly recorded track on that compilation), it was a number-one hit on the U.S. Billboard Hot Country Singles & Tracks. It also reached number 5 on the Canadian RPM Country Tracks chart.

== Background and writing ==
Jackson told Billboard magazine, "Everybody kept telling me, 'You need to come out with a positive love song.' I've had a lot of sad ballads, but I have a hard time writing those [positive love songs] because there's a tendency to get real sappy with them so they're not real. That's the way most of them come off to me. I wanted to write one that was realistic, what I call a realistic approach to a positive love song."

== Content ==
The song is a love ballad with the male narrator pledging his faithfulness to his significant other regardless of the relationship complications that may occasionally arise and despite the narrator's imperfect well-being. The line "We both know damn well it's not easy together," from the first verse, was changed to "We both know too well..." in the radio edit.

== Critical reception ==
Deborah Evans Price of Billboard magazine reviewed the song favorably, saying "How refreshing—an honest love song. Instead of promising the moon and stars, Jackson has penned a song that simply says, "I'm not perfect, just another man/But I will give you all that I am/And I'll try to love only you/And I'll try my best to be true/Oh darlin' I'll try." What more could a woman want? Honesty is the best policy, and this realistic look at love is destined to be a hit with country music lovers everywhere."

== Chart positions ==
"I'll Try" debuted at number 67 on the U.S. Billboard Hot Country Singles & Tracks for the week of December 30, 1995.

Chart (1996)	Peak position
Canada Country Singles (RPM)	5
US Hot Country Songs (Billboard)	1

=== Year-end charts ===
Chart (1996)	Position
Canada Country Tracks (RPM)	71
US Country Songs (Billboard)	29
