= Dallas (Alan Jackson song) =

Single by Alan Jackson

from the album Don't Rock the Jukebox
- B-side: "Just Playin' Possum"
- Released: December 30, 1991
- Recorded: January 4, 1991
- Genre: Country
- Length: 2:43
- Label: Arista 12385
- Songwriters: Alan Jackson; Keith Stegall
- Producers: Scott Hendricks; Keith Stegall

Alan Jackson singles chronology
| "Someday" (1991) | "Dallas" (1991) | "Midnight in Montgomery" (1992) |

"Dallas" is a song written by American country music artists Alan Jackson and Keith Stegall, and recorded by Jackson. It was released in December 1991 as the third single from Jackson's second album, Don't Rock the Jukebox. The song peaked at number 1 on the Billboard Hot Country Singles & Tracks chart, Jackson's fourth consecutive single to top the chart, as well as number 1 on the Canadian RPM Country Tracks chart, Jackson's fourth single to top that chart also.

== Background and writing ==
According to the liner notes of his 1995 album The Greatest Hits Collection, Jackson was inspired to write the song after having played at Billy Bob's in Fort Worth, Texas. After playing the show, he commented that he "wished Dallas was in Tennessee" and based the song off that comment.

== Content ==
"Dallas" is a song in which the male narrator tells of a lover named Dallas who has left him for Dallas, Texas. He then goes on to say that he wishes that Dallas were in Tennessee — both the city and his former lover.

== Critical reception ==
Kevin John Coyne of Country Universe gave the song a B+ grade," calling it "a simple enough song, yet with some clever lyrics, a generous dose of pedal steel and Jackson's typical smooth, agreeable vocals."

== Peak chart positions ==
"Dallas" debuted on the U.S. Billboard Hot Country Singles & Tracks for the week of January 4, 1992.

| Chart (1991–1992) | Peak position |
|---|---|
| Canada Country Singles (RPM) | 1 |
| US Hot Country Songs (Billboard) | 1 |

=== Year-end charts ===
| Chart (1992) | Position |
|---|---|
| Canada Country Tracks (RPM) | 13 |
| US Country Songs (Billboard) | 6 |
