= Heart Records and Tapes of Canada Ltd. =

Canadian independent record label

Heart Records and Tapes of Canada Ltd. was a Canadian Independent record label based in Calgary. It was started in 1978 by owners Ron Mahonin and Val Mahonin. The first single, "A Hit Song" was written by Ron Mahonin and recorded at One Step Up in Los Angeles under the direction of manager Marc Gordon, who added Mahonin to his artist roster. The song (also known as "Trying To Write A Hit Song") had previously won semi-finalist in the American Song Festival and was covered by the pop group Player on their debut album of the same name.

The single was released in Canada on the self-owned label simply out of need to get the recording out and recoup some of the investment - and surprisingly the record quickly gained ground in Canadian radio airplay, and a distribution deal was made with Quality Records, thus giving the label a chance to release a second single with some credibility. The label grew (almost unintentionally) to release some 38 singles and half a dozen albums - from Adult Contemporary and Pop to Country - over the course of its five-year existence. Some artists releasing on the label were Rick Morgenstern, Ron Mahonin, Doug Watt, Sherry Kennedy Mary Lu Zahalan to name a few.

Mindful of Canadian Radio-television and Telecommunications Commission Canadian content regulations and after substantial Canadian airplay, some releases picked up notable awards - for example, Mahonin's "You Came Into My Life" won Pro Canada's Song of the Year Award for outstanding airplay, as did "Hotel Eldorado" penned by Bonnie James (Kruzik) and Ed Molyski. A number of the releases were distributed in other countries, and songs from the publishing catalogue were subsequently re-recorded by other artists in other countries. Via sub-publishing and co-publishing arrangements, some of these recordings were released in countries such as Spain, France, Belgium, Portugal, South Africa and some, such as The Kids even found a position on the Top 40 charts of Japan.

As the label's popularity grew, and after floundering through various distributors until finally organizing its own distribution network, the label gained a broader acceptance in the Canadian industry - both in the radio community and the distribution community. Not only were songwriters and other publishers trying to align with this growing company, but surprisingly, a few other well-known independent Canadian labels sought distribution with the Heart Records network.

Prior to its demise in 1983, the label was named the Number 7 most popular label in an RPM Magazine poll, as voted for by the radio industry reporting to RPM. The financial backing needed to compete on the world stage was never secured, and the label quietly closed its doors in 1983 after contributing to the mosaic of the Canadian music industry for a six-year stretch.

== See also ==
- List of record labels
