= Greg Holland (musician) =

American country musician (born Feb. 22,1968)

- Born: Johnny, till mother changed to Gregory; February 22, 1967 (age 58)
- Origin: Douglas, Georgia, United States
- Genres: Country
- Occupation: Singer
- Years active: 1994-present
- Labels: Warner Bros., Asylum

Greg Holland is an American country musician. Holland grew up in Douglas, Georgia, where he performed as a youngster in local play productions and on television. He recorded a demo before reaching his teens and opened in concert for Ronnie Milsap when he was 12 years old. Holland played several instruments in the school band in high school, and also played in a rock group called The Bad Boys. He spent three years in the Army, performing with a soldiers' group in Europe, Excitement 89, and upon his return joined band touring Ga and FL named Borderline, several years of clubs and trips solo to Nashville signed with Warner Bros. Records. Two solo albums followed, one for Warner in 1994 and one for Asylum in 1997.

== Discography ==
=== Albums ===
Title	Album details
Let Me Drive	Release date: September 13, 1994; Label: Warner Bros. Records
Exception to the Rule	Release date: March 25, 1997; Label: Asylum Records

=== Singles ===
Year	Single	Peak chart positions		Album
Year	Single	US Country	CAN Country	Album
1994	"Let Me Drive"	63	58	Let Me Drive
1994	"When I Come Back (I Wanna Be My Dog)"	66	82	Let Me Drive
1997	"Divine Intervention"	—	—	Exception to the Rule
1997	"Exception to the Rule"	—	—	Exception to the Rule
"—" denotes releases that did not chart

=== Music videos ===
Year	Video	Director
1994	"Let Me Drive"	Steven T. Miller/R. Brad Murano
1994	"When I Come Back (I Wanna Be My Dog)"	
