= I'd Love You All Over Again =

Single by Alan Jackson

from the album Here in the Real World
- B-side: "Home"
- Released: January 7, 1991
- Recorded: June 26, 1989
- Genre: Country
- Length: 3:11
- Label: Arista 2166
- Songwriter: Alan Jackson
- Producers: Scott Hendricks; Keith Stegall

Alan Jackson singles chronology
"Chasin' That Neon Rainbow" (1990)	"I'd Love You All Over Again" (1991)	"Don't Rock the Jukebox" (1991)

"I'd Love You All Over Again" is a song written and recorded by American country music artist Alan Jackson. It was released in January 1991 as the last single from his debut album, Here in the Real World and the song was Jackson's first number 1 single on the Billboard Hot Country Singles & Tracks chart, as well as his second number 1 on the Canadian RPM Country Tracks chart.

== Content ==
The song is told from the point of view of a husband celebrating his 10th anniversary. He states that if he had the chance to love his wife for the first time again, he would. The song was written for Alan's wife, Denise in a hotel room in Pine Bluff, Arkansas on a rainy evening.

== Critical reception ==
Kevin John Coyne of Country Universe gave the song an A grade," saying that the song "showcases a particular skill that Jackson has as a songwriter. He can include a clever turn of phrase without it sounding forced, or worse, distracting from the overall mood."

== Peak chart positions ==
Chart (1991)	Peak position
Canada Country Singles (RPM)	1
US Hot Country Songs (Billboard)	1

=== Year-end charts ===
Chart (1991)	Position
Canada Country Tracks (RPM)	30
US Country Songs (Billboard)	11
