= Long Live King George =

Compilation album by George Jones
- Released: March 11, 1965
- Recorded: August 27, 1955 – April 21, 1958
- Genres: Country, rockabilly
- Label: Starday
- Producer: Pappy Daily

George Jones chronology
The Great George Jones (1964)	Long Live King George (1965)	Greatest Hits, Vol. 2 (1965)

Singles from Long Live King George
- 1. "Why Baby Why" Released: August 27, 1955; 2. "I'm Ragged But I'm Right" Released: February 1956; 3. "You Gotta Be My Baby" Released: March 1956; 4. "No, No, Never (flip)" Released: July 1, 1957; 5. "Take the Devil Out of Me (flip)" Released: October 21, 1957; 6. "Tall, Tall Trees" Released: August 26, 1957; 7. "Nothing Can Stop Me" Released: June 23, 1958; 8. "Jesus Wants Me" Released: June 30, 1958; 9. "If I Don't Love You (Grits Ain't Groceries) (flip)" Released: October 13, 1958

Long Live King George is a 1965 country music album released by George Jones. The album was long thought to be a studio release; however, it is a late Starday Records compilation of Jones recordings throughout the mid- to late 1950s.

The album features many of Jones' early songs, including many of his earliest hits, "You Gotta Be My Baby" from 1956, "Seasons of My Heart" from 1955, and Jones' first chart single "Why Baby Why" in 1955. It lists a track from his third collaboration attempt in 1957 with Virginia Spurlock titled: "No, No, Never".

== Background and composition ==
In late 1956, there were shakeups in some of the top management jobs in Nashville and part of this realignment saw Starday Records, an independent country music label founded in Houston by Jones's producer and mentor H.W. "Pappy" Daily and Jack Starns, absorbed into Mercury Records. As Colin Escott writes in the liner notes to the Jones retrospective Cup of Loneliness: The Classic Mercury Years, Daily and Starday president Don Pierce were approached to take over Mercury's country roster to form the Mercury-Starday label but "the clincher was the success of George Jones. After 12 years in the business, Mercury hadn't found one country artist who had promised or delivered half of what George had." By July 1958, Mercury-Starday dissolved with Pierce assuming control of Starday and Jones remaining at Mercury with Daily producing him.

Jones wrote or co-wrote all of the selections on Long Live King George. Two selections, "Nothing Can Stop My Love" and "Tall, Tall Trees", were co-written with Jones's friend Roger Miller, the latter becoming a chart-topping country hit for Alan Jackson in 1995. Jones also collaborated with J.P. Richardson (better known as the Big Bopper) on the upbeat "If I Don't Love You (Grits Ain't Groceries)" (which, aside from the title line, has no relation to the R&B song "Grits Ain't Groceries"). Richardson would also compose "White Lightnin'", which would become Jones's first number one in 1959.

Long Live King George includes several songs, such as his first chart hit "Why Baby Why", that appeared on his 1957 debut album Grand Ole Opry's New Star. As Jones star continued to rise in the country music field, Starday would continue to release albums featuring recordings by Jones culled from its archive, including several rockabilly sides that the singer detested. Starday would continue this practice into the 1970s. Jones would later explain to Nick Tosches in 1994, "There was no such thing as production at Starday. We’d go in with the band, we’d go over the song, I’d look over and tell the steel player to take a break or kick it off, and I’d get the fiddle to play a turnaround in the middle. I’d just let them know if we were going to tag it or not. We’d just go through it. We didn’t take the pains of making several takes. Back then, over three or four takes, they’d say, 'My God, this is costing us money.' So we’d just get it down as good as we could. If we went a little flat or sharp in a place or two, they’d say, 'The public ain’t going to notice that, so put it out.' So we did, and it wasn’t too successful, so I think maybe the public did notice it."

Professional ratings
Review scores
Source	Rating
Allmusic	link

== Track listing ==
Side One
No.	Title	Writer(s)	Length
1.	"Nothing Can Stop My Love"	Roger Miller, George Jones	2:27
2.	"No Use to Cry"	Jones	2:15
3.	"No, No, Never (w/ Virginia Spurlock)"	Jones, Bernard Spurlock	2:04
4.	"If I Don't Love You (Grits Ain't Groceries)"	Jones, J.P. Richardson	1:54
5.	"Seasons of My Heart"	Jones, Darrell Edwards	2:55
6.	"Jesus Wants Me"	Jones, Eddie Noack	1:59

Side Two
No.	Title	Writer(s)	Length
7.	"You Gotta Be My Baby"	Jones	2:29
8.	"I Gotta Talk to Your Heart"	Jones	2:21
9.	"Tall, Tall Trees"	Miller, Jones	2:24
10.	"I'm Ragged But Right"	Jones	2:14
11.	"Why Baby Why"	Jones, Edwards	2:18
12.	"Take the Devil Out of Me"	Jones	2:39
