= Someday (Alan Jackson song) =

Single by Alan Jackson

from the album Don't Rock the Jukebox
- B-side: "From a Distance"
- Released: August 19, 1991
- Recorded: August 21, 1990
- Genre: Country
- Length: 3:18
- Label: Arista 12335
- Songwriters: Alan Jackson; Jim McBride
- Producers: Scott Hendricks; Keith Stegall

Alan Jackson singles chronology
"Don't Rock the Jukebox" (1991)	"Someday" (1991)	"Dallas" (1991)

"Someday" is a song written by American country music singer Alan Jackson and Jim McBride, and recorded by Jackson. It was released in August 1991 as the second single from Jackson's second album, Don't Rock The Jukebox. The song peaked at number 1 on the Billboard Hot Country Singles & Tracks chart, and number 2 on the Canadian RPM Country Tracks chart.

== Content ==
The narrator in the song is seeing his relationship with his significant other end because she's finally moving on. The man was always saying he'd get his act together someday, but someday never came around and she got sick of waiting. At the end of the song, the narrator proves he has gotten his act together by fixing up an old car he said he'd get around to "someday" and driving to his ex's work where she drives off with him.

== Critical reception ==
Kevin John Coyne of Country Universe gave the song an A grade, saying that "one of Jackson’s greatest strengths as a writer is that he’s able to craft lyrics that weave everyday jargon into poetry. The man and woman here talk like real people talk, but the conversation is structured in such a way that it elevates it into art."

== Music video ==
The music video was directed by Mark Lindquist and premiered in mid-1991.

== Peak chart positions ==
"Someday" debuted at No. 50 on the U.S. Billboard Hot Country Singles & Tracks for the week of August 31, 1991.

Chart (1991)	Peak position
Canada Country Singles (RPM)	2
US Hot Country Songs (Billboard)	1

=== Year-end charts ===
Chart (1991)	Position
Canada Country Tracks (RPM)	51
US Country Songs (Billboard)	63
