= Midnight in Montgomery =

Single by Alan Jackson

from the album Don't Rock the Jukebox
- B-side: "Working Class Hero"
- Released: April 20, 1992
- Recorded: August 21, 1990
- Genre: Country
- Length: 3:46
- Label: Arista 12418
- Songwriters: Alan Jackson; Don Sampson
- Producers: Scott Hendricks; Keith Stegall

Alan Jackson singles chronology
"Dallas" (1991)	"Midnight in Montgomery" (1992)	"Love's Got a Hold on You" (1992)

"Midnight in Montgomery" is a song written by American country music singer Alan Jackson and Don Sampson, and recorded by Jackson. It was released in April 1992 as the fourth single from Jackson's second album, Don't Rock the Jukebox. The song peaked at number 3 on the Billboard Hot Country Singles & Tracks chart (the album's only single not to top the chart), and number 3 as well on the Canadian RPM Country Tracks chart. It has been featured on numerous compilation albums by Jackson, such as 34 Number Ones and the 2015 box set Genuine: The Alan Jackson Story.

In August 2020, Josh Turner recorded a cover version of "Midnight In Montgomery" on his album Country State of Mind.

== Content ==
This song was written about Hank Williams, who was from Montgomery, Alabama. It is a mid-tempo, largely acoustic ballad in the key of D minor.

The singer, while heading to Mobile for a New Year's Eve show, makes a visit to a Montgomery grave (Williams died on New Year's Day 1953, and is buried in Montgomery), and encounters the ghost of Williams who thanks him for paying tribute before disappearing. The song also references several Williams hits, including "I'm So Lonesome I Could Cry." The song ends with the words "Hank's always singing there".

== Critical reception ==
Leeann Ward of Country Universe gave the song an A grade, saying that "the song’s story is fascinating in and of itself, but equally impressive is the recording as a whole package." She goes on to say that "along with the ominous production and chilling story, Jackson’s performance strays from its usual smooth reliability and picks up its own haunting quality, which perfectly adds to the overall darkness of the song."

== Music video ==
The music video was directed by Jim Shea and premiered in April 1992. It was filmed in black and white under a full moon amidst the headstones of an empty cemetery. It went on to win that year's Country Music Association award for Music Video of the Year. They had to record the video twice, in the first take, there was a shadow that wasn't supposed to be in the video.

== Charts ==
"Midnight in Montgomery" debuted on the U.S. Billboard Hot Country Singles & Tracks for the week of April 25, 1992.

Chart (1992)	Peak position
Canada Country Singles (RPM)	3
US Hot Country Songs (Billboard)	3

=== Year-end charts ===
Chart (1992)	Position
Canada Country Tracks (RPM)	12
US Country Songs (Billboard)	27

== Certifications ==
Certifications for Midnight in Montgomery
Region	Certification	Certified units/sales
United States (RIAA)	Gold	500,000^{‡}
^{‡} Sales+streaming figures based on certification alone.

== See also ==
- Oakwood Cemetery (Montgomery, Alabama)
