= Here in the Real World (song) =

Single by Alan Jackson

from the album Here in the Real World
- B-side: "Blue Blooded Woman"
- Released: January 15, 1990
- Recorded: June 27, 1989
- Genre: Country
- Length: 3:36
- Label: Arista Nashville 9922
- Songwriters: Mark Irwin; Alan Jackson
- Producers: Scott Hendricks; Keith Stegall

Alan Jackson singles chronology
"Blue Blooded Woman" (1989)	"Here in the Real World" (1990)	"Wanted" (1990)

"Here in the Real World" is a song co-written and recorded by American country music artist Alan Jackson. It was released in January 1990 as the second single and title track from his debut album Here in the Real World, and in early 1990 it became his first Top 10 country hit. The song reached a peak of number 3 on the U.S. Billboard Hot Country Singles & Tracks charts, and number 1 on the Canadian RPM Top Country Tracks charts and 162 in the UK in August 1990. Jackson wrote the song with Mark Irwin. The song is also included on Jackson's 2015 career-spanning box set Genuine: The Alan Jackson Story.

== Content ==
The song is a mid-tempo piece, firmly in the neotraditional style, backed by fiddle and steel-string acoustic guitar, in which the narrator observes the difference between an idealized movie situation and the real world, saying "If life were like the movies, I'd never be blue". In the chorus, he observes that "here in the real world, it's not that easy at all / 'Cause when hearts get broken, it's real tears that fall."

== Critical reception ==
Kevin John Coyne of Country Universe gave the song an A grade," calling the conceit "bloody well brilliant, what with the juxtaposition of reality and fiction, but none of its intelligence would matter without the heartbroke sincerity that gives it its simplicity." An uncredited review from Cash Box magazine was also positive, praising the neotraditionalist country sound and saying that Jackson "gives us incredible lyrics with just the right hooks. This cut offers a strong sense of comfort and a vocal range that’s totally soothing."

== Music video ==
The music video was directed by Jim May and premiered in early 1990. It begins with a retro-style title card, features mostly Jackson performing, and closes with a brief snippet of Gene Autry singing "Back in the Saddle Again."

== Covers ==
- Glen Campbell recorded the song on his 1994 album Glen Campbell Live! His Greatest Hits
- George Jones recorded this song on his last studio album, Hits I Missed...And One I Didn't
- Charley Pride recorded the song on his 1991 album Classics With Pride

== Charts ==
Chart (1990)	Peak position
Canada Country Singles (RPM)	1
US Hot Country Songs (Billboard)	3

=== Year-end charts ===
Chart (1990)	Position
Canada Country Tracks (RPM)	7
US Country Songs (Billboard)	10

== Certifications ==
Certifications for Here in the Real World
Region	Certification	Certified units/sales
United States (RIAA)	Gold	500,000^{‡}
^{‡} Sales+streaming figures based on certification alone.
