= There Ain't No Good Chain Gang =

- Dutch release picture sleeve

Single by Johnny Cash with Waylon Jennings

from the album I Would Like to See You Again
- B-side: "I Wish I Was Crazy Again"
- Released: May 20, 1978
- Genre: Outlaw country
- Length: 3:16
- Label: Columbia
- Songwriters: Hal Bynum, Dave Kirby
- Producer: Larry Butler

Johnny Cash singles chronology
"I Would Like to See You Again" (1978)	"There Ain't No Good Chain Gang" (1978)	"Gone Girl" (1978)

Waylon Jennings singles chronology
"Mammas Don't Let Your Babies Grow Up to Be Cowboys" (1978)	"There Ain't No Good Chain Gang" (1978)	"I've Always Been Crazy" (1978)

"There Ain't No Good Chain Gang" is a song written by Hal Bynum and Dave Kirby, and recorded by American country music artists Johnny Cash and Waylon Jennings. It was released in May 1978 as the second single from the album I Would Like to See You Again. The song reached #2 on the Billboard Hot Country Singles & Tracks chart.

== Content ==
The song is written and sung from the perspective of a prison inmate, writing back home to his family. He tells of the lessons he's learned while incarcerated; the chorus tells the four main ones:

1. "There ain't no good in an evil-hearted woman",
2. "I ain't cut out to be no Jesse James",
3. "You don't go writing hot checks down in Mississippi", and
4. "There ain't no good chain gang".

== Chart performance ==
Chart (1978)	Peak position
US Hot Country Songs (Billboard)	2
Canadian RPM Country Tracks	5
