= Wanted (Alan Jackson song) =

Single by Alan Jackson

from the album Here in the Real World
- B-side: "Dog River Blues"
- Released: May 24, 1990
- Recorded: June 26, 1989
- Genre: Country
- Length: 2:56
- Label: Arista 2032
- Songwriters: Alan Jackson; Charlie Craig
- Producers: Scott Hendricks; Keith Stegall

Alan Jackson singles chronology
"Here in the Real World" (1990)	"Wanted" (1990)	"Chasin' That Neon Rainbow" (1990)

"Wanted" is a song written by American country music artist Alan Jackson and Charlie Craig, and recorded by Jackson. It was released in May 1990 as the third single from Jackson's first album, Here in the Real World. The song peaked at number 3 on both the Billboard Hot Country Singles & Tracks (now Hot Country Songs) charts and the Canadian RPM Country Tracks Chart.

== Background and writing ==
The front cover resembles a western "wanted" poster. Jackson was inspired to write the song after seeing a wanted poster in an old John Wayne movie.

== Content ==
The song is a mid-tempo ballad in which the male narrator decides to place a classified ad in the local newspaper. To the casual reader, the words may describe what is desired from a lover: "Wanted, one good hearted woman / To forgive imperfection / In the man that she loves". However, the ad turns out to be a plea for forgiveness, the man admitting that he did the woman he loves wrong and, now deeply remorseful, hopes she will forgive his transgression when she reads the ad: "Wanted: just one chance to tell her / How much he still loves her / He can't be sorry enough."

== Critical reception ==
Kevin John Coyne of Country Universe gave the song a B− grade," saying that the song contains "heartfelt vocal and sincere delivery." He goes on to say that "if a lesser singer was at the mic, the sheer implausibility of the lyric would be nakedly evident, but Jackson will have you looking in the classified section, expecting the chorus to be there."

== Music video ==
The music video was directed by Bing Sokolsky and premiered in mid-1990.

== Peak chart positions ==
Chart (1990)	Peak position
Canada Country Singles (RPM)	3
US Hot Country Songs (Billboard)	3

=== Year-end charts ===
Chart (1990)	Position
Canada Country Tracks (RPM)	33
US Country Songs (Billboard)	30
