= Chasin' That Neon Rainbow =

Single by Alan Jackson

from the album Here in the Real World
- B-side: "Short Sweet Ride"
- Released: September 1990
- Recorded: June 26, 1989
- Genre: Country
- Length: 3:06
- Label: Arista 2095
- Songwriters: Alan Jackson; Jim McBride
- Producers: Scott Hendricks; Keith Stegall

Alan Jackson singles chronology
"Wanted" (1990)	"Chasin' That Neon Rainbow" (1990)	"I'd Love You All Over Again" (1991)

"Chasin' That Neon Rainbow" is a song written by American country music artist Alan Jackson and Jim McBride, and recorded by Jackson. It was released in September 1990 as the fourth single from Jackson's first album, Here in the Real World. The song peaked at number 2 on the Billboard Hot Country Singles & Tracks chart, behind "I've Come to Expect It from You" by George Strait, and number 5 on the Canadian RPM Country Tracks chart.

== Background and writing ==
Jackson recounts the song's origins in the album notes. "Jim McBride and I were writing together for the first time. We were talking about my life in Georgia and the experience of playing the honky tonk circuit. I remembered a radio that my daddy won when I was a young child and how my mama used to sing to my sisters and me. I also remembered how my mama hated for me to play in the bars. All those things set the story in motion, and within a few sessions, my life chasing that neon rainbow was set to music."

== Content ==
The song recounts the narrator's life of trying to make it big as a country music artist.

== Critical reception ==
Kevin John Coyne of Country Universe gave the song an A grade," calling the song "memorable" due to "an exuberant melody and decidedly country production, but the lyrics are anything but lightweight." He goes on to say that the song is "sung with a humble innocence, exudes boundless gratefulness and optimism for a budding career."

== Music video ==
The music video was directed by Jack Cole and premiered on CMT on September 12, 1990. It depicts Jackson going to a bar to audition as a musical act for the bar. The ending of Jackson's next single (and first Number One), "I'd Love You All Over Again", is heard in the beginning of the video at the bar.

== Charts ==
Chart (1990)	Peak position
Canada Country Singles (RPM)	5
US Hot Country Songs (Billboard)	2

=== Year-end charts ===
Chart (1991)	Position
US Country Songs (Billboard)	48

== Certifications ==
Certifications for Chasin' That Neon Rainbow
Region	Certification	Certified units/sales
United States (RIAA)	Platinum	1,000,000^{‡}
^{‡} Sales+streaming figures based on certification alone.
