= Don't Rock the Jukebox =

Studio album by Alan Jackson
- Released: May 14, 1991
- Recorded: August 21, 1990–January 4, 1991
- Studios: Recording Arts, 16th Avenue Sound, Sound Emporium, The Castle and Digital Recorders, Nashville, TN
- Genre: Neotraditional country
- Length: 31:21
- Label: Arista
- Producers: Scott Hendricks; Keith Stegall

Alan Jackson chronology
Here in the Real World (1990)	Don't Rock the Jukebox (1991)	A Lot About Livin' (And a Little 'bout Love) (1992)

Singles from Don't Rock the Jukebox
- 1. "Don't Rock the Jukebox" Released: April 29, 1991; 2. "Someday" Released: August 19, 1991; 3. "Dallas" Released: December 30, 1991; 4. "Midnight in Montgomery" Released: April 20, 1992; 5. "Love's Got a Hold on You" Released: July 13, 1992

Don't Rock the Jukebox is the second studio album by American country music artist Alan Jackson. It was released on May 14, 1991, and produced five singles on the Hot Country Songs charts; the title track, "Someday", "Dallas", and "Love's Got a Hold on You", which all reached number 1, and "Midnight in Montgomery" (a tribute song to Hank Williams) which peaked at number 3. Fellow country music artist George Jones makes a cameo on the album, singing the last line on "Just Playin' Possum". ("The Possum" was one of Jones' nicknames.)

Professional ratings
Review scores
Source	Rating
AllMusic	4.5/5 stars
Chicago Tribune	4/4 stars
Robert Christgau	(choice cut)
Entertainment Weekly	A
(The New) Rolling Stone Album Guide	2.5/5 stars

== Commercial performance ==
Don't Rock the Jukebox peaked at No. 17 on the U.S. Billboard 200 and No. 2 on the Top Country Albums chart. In August 2026, Don't Rock the Jukebox was certified 5× Platinum by the RIAA.

== Track listing ==
No.	Title	Writer(s)	Length
1.	"Don't Rock the Jukebox"	Alan Jackson, Roger Murrah, Keith Stegall	2:52
2.	"That's All I Need to Know"	Jackson, Jim McBride	3:47
3.	"Dallas"	Jackson, Stegall	2:43
4.	"Midnight in Montgomery"	Jackson, Don Sampson	3:46
5.	"Love's Got a Hold on You"	Carson Chamberlain, Stegall	2:54
6.	"Someday"	Jackson, McBride	3:18
7.	"Just Playin' Possum"	Jackson, McBride, Gary Overton	2:54
8.	"From a Distance"	Alan Jackson; Randy Travis	3:38
9.	"Walkin' the Floor Over Me"	Jackson, Sampson	2:26
10.	"Working Class Hero"	Jackson, Sampson	3:14

Note

- On the vinyl and cassette versions of the album, "Walkin' the Floor Over Me" is placed as track #5, following "Midnight in Montgomery" as the end of Side A.

== Personnel ==
- Alan Jackson - lead vocals, backing vocals
- Eddie Bayers - drums
- Bruce Rutherford - drums, backing vocals
- Michael Rhodes - bass guitar
- Roger Wills - bass guitar
- Roy Huskey Jr. - upright bass
- Dirk Johnson - piano
- Hargus "Pig" Robbins - piano
- Brent Mason - acoustic guitar, electric guitar
- Bruce Watkins - acoustic guitar
- Danny Groah - electric guitar
- Robbie Flint - steel guitar
- Paul Franklin - steel guitar
- Rob Hajacos - fiddle
- Mark McClurg - fiddle
- George Jones - guest vocals on "Just Playin' Possum"

Production

- Scott Hendricks - producer, engineer, mixing
- Keith Stegall - producer
- Hans Akelsen - engineer
- Paul Cochrane - engineer
- Jeff Coppage - engineer
- Bill Heath - engineer
- Clark Hook - engineer
- Gary Laney - engineer
- Mark Nevers - engineer
- John David Parker - engineer
- Dave Sinko - engineer
- Hank Williams - mastering

== Charts ==
Chart (1991)	Peak position
U.S. Billboard 200	17
U.S. Billboard Top Country Albums	2
Canadian RPM Country Albums	6

== Certifications ==
Certifications for Don't Rock the Jukebox
Region	Certification	Certified units/sales
Canada (Music Canada)	2× Platinum	200,000^{^}
United States (RIAA)	5× Platinum	5,000,000^{‡}
^{^} Shipments figures based on certification alone.^{‡} Sales+streaming figures based on certification alone.
