= Don't Rock the Jukebox (song) =

Single by Alan Jackson

from the album Don't Rock the Jukebox
- B-side: "Walkin' the Floor Over Me"
- Released: April 29, 1991
- Recorded: August 21, 1990
- Genre: Country
- Length: 2:52
- Label: Arista (2220)
- Songwriters: Alan Jackson, Roger Murrah, Keith Stegall
- Producers: Scott Hendricks, Keith Stegall

Alan Jackson singles chronology
"I'd Love You All Over Again" (1991)	"Don't Rock the Jukebox" (1991)	"Someday" (1991)

"Don't Rock the Jukebox" is a song by American country music artist Alan Jackson. It was released on April 29, 1991, as the lead single from the album of the same name. It was his second consecutive Number One single on the U.S. Billboard Hot Country Singles & Tracks charts. Jackson wrote the song with Roger Murrah and Keith Stegall.

The song also received an ASCAP award for Country Song of the Year in 1992. That same year, the song was covered by Alvin and the Chipmunks, featuring commentary by Alan Jackson himself, for their 1992 album Chipmunks in Low Places.

== Background and writing ==
The song is sung from the perspective of a heartbroken bar patron who wishes to hear country music to ease his heartbreak. As such, he tells the other patrons in the bar, "don't rock the jukebox" (i.e. play country instead of rock).

Jackson wrote about the inspiration at the beginning of the video: "I wanna tell you a little story about an incident that happened on the road a couple years ago when me and my band, The Strayhorns, were playing this little truck stop lounge up in Doswell, Virginia, a place called Geraldine's. We'd been there for four or five nights, you know, playing those dance sets. It'd been a long night, I took a break and walked over to the Jukebox. Roger, my bass player, was already over there reading the records, you know. I leaned up on the corner of it and one of the legs was broken off, jukebox kind of wobbling around, you know. And Roger looked up at me and said...".

== Cover versions ==
Country music singer Dierks Bentley covered the song from the television special CMT Giants: Alan Jackson.

== Critical reception ==
Kevin John Coyne of Country Universe gave the song an A grade," saying that the song "defies explanation" because Jackson "perfectly inhabits the song’s affable weariness, and because Scott Hendricks and Keith Stegall arrange it to honky-tonk heaven."

== Music video ==
The music video for the song premiered on May 2, 1991 on CMT, and was directed by Julien Temple, and begins in black and white, where Jackson described about the song, and then, it cuts to Jackson playing his guitar and singing the song while standing in front of a jukebox. As he does this, a seated figure in the shadows nods his head and taps the table to the beat. Several people come and dance in front of the jukebox during the song, including Hal Smith, referencing or possibly reprising his role as Otis Campbell from The Andy Griffith Show, while some people who come up to the jukebox shake it around angrily, thus prompting Jackson to sing the title line of the song. At the end of the video, the seated figure morphs into George Jones, who is mentioned in the song's lyrics several times.

== Charts ==
Chart (1991)	Peak position
Canada Country Singles (RPM)	1
US Hot Country Songs (Billboard)	1

=== Year-end charts ===
Chart (1991)	Position
Canada Country Tracks (RPM)	8
US Country Songs (Billboard)	1

== Certifications ==
Certifications for Don't Rock the Jukebox
Region	Certification	Certified units/sales
United States (RIAA)	Platinum	1,000,000^{‡}
^{‡} Sales+streaming figures based on certification alone.
