= Hal Bynum =

American singer-songwriter (1934–2022)

- Born: Harold Lynn Bynum; September 29, 1934; Ralls, Texas, U.S.
- Died: June 2, 2022 (aged 87)
- Genres: Country music
- Occupation: songwriter

Harold Lynn Bynum (September 29, 1934 – June 2, 2022) was an American songwriter associated with the outlaw country movement in the 1970s. Bynum wrote more than 200 songs for popular country artists, including Kenny Rogers ("Lucille"), Patty Loveless ("Chains"), Johnny Cash ("Papa Was a Good Man"), Cash and Waylon Jennings ("There Ain't No Good Chain Gang"), and Jim Reeves ("Nobody's Fool"). Bynum also wrote "The Old, Old House", which has been performed by George Jones, Bill Monroe, Ralph Stanley, and the Grateful Dead.

In 1977, Bynum received songwriter awards from the Country Music Association Awards and the Academy of Country Music for "Lucille" (co-written with Roger Bowling), the Song of the Year. Bynum's autobiographical book, The Promise (2002) (also the name of his 2002 album), describes his upbringing in Texas and his work as a songwriter in Nashville. Both his book and the album of the same name were released on Bynum's Beauregard Books/Records label. Bynum is also known for his spoken word recordings.

He died from the combined effects of Alzheimer's disease and a stroke at the age of 87 in June 2022.

== Selected discography ==
- If I Could Do Anything (1998)
- The Promise (2002)
- An American Prayer (2004)
