= Charlie Craig (songwriter) =

American songwriter

Charlie Craig (September 30, 1938 – July 1, 2011) was an American songwriter born and raised in Watts Mills, South Carolina. He relocated to Nashville, Tennessee, and spent over 40 years in the music industry. Some of his songs have been recorded by Keith Whitley, Dolly Parton, Kenny Rogers, Alan Jackson, Travis Tritt, Johnny Cash, Aaron Tippin and George Strait. Craig died of lung cancer on July 1, 2011, in Nashville.

== Hit songs recorded by other artists ==
- "Between an Old Memory and Me" – Travis Tritt
- "I Think I'm in Love" – Keith Stegall
- "I Would Like to See You Again" – Johnny Cash
- "Lay a Little Lovin' on Me" – Del Reeves
- "Leavin's Been a Long Time Comin'" – Shenandoah
- "The Generation Gap" – Jeannie C. Riley, Hoodoo Gurus
- "She's Single Again" – Janie Fricke
- "Wanted" – Alan Jackson
