= Alan Jackson albums discography =

Alan Jackson discography
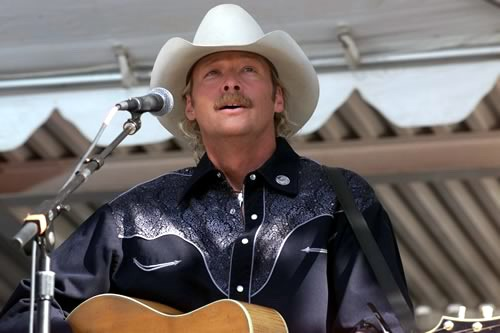
- Studio albums: 22
- Live albums: 1
- Compilation albums: 14
- Tribute albums: 1
- Video albums: 6

Alan Jackson is an American country music artist. The first artist signed to Arista Nashville, he was with them from 1989 to 2011. He has released 21 studio albums (22 counting New Traditional), including two Christmas albums, and a tribute album for the label, as well as released 14 compilation albums. His second greatest hits album Greatest Hits Volume II is his highest-certified album, being certified 7× Platinum by the Recording Industry Association of America, with sales in the United States of over 7,000,000. His other greatest hits album (1995's The Greatest Hits Collection) as well as his 1992 studio album, A Lot About Livin' (And a Little 'bout Love), are his second highest-certified albums, at 6× Platinum. He has sold over 40 million albums in the United States since 1991 when Nielsen SoundScan began tracking sales for Billboard.

In addition to releasing country albums, in 2006, he released Precious Memories, an album composed of Christian music as well as gospel music. The album was a commercial success, charting to number one on the Top Country Albums and the Top Christian Albums music charts. It is one of several Platinum-selling albums for Jackson.

== Studio albums ==
=== 1980s and 1990s ===
Title	Details	Peak chart positions						Certifications (sales threshold)
Title	Details	US Country	US	CAN Country	CAN	AUS	UK	Certifications (sales threshold)
New Traditional	Release date: November 16, 1987; Label: Americana Records	—	—	—	—	—	—	
Here in the Real World	Release date: February 27, 1990; Label: Arista Nashville	4	57	—	—	—	—	RIAA: 2× Platinum; MC: 2× Platinum
Don't Rock the Jukebox	Release date: May 14, 1991; Label: Arista Nashville	2	17	6	—	—	—	RIAA: 5× Platinum; MC: 2× Platinum
A Lot About Livin' (And a Little 'bout Love)	Release date: October 6, 1992; Label: Arista Nashville	1	13	5	22	—	—	RIAA: 6× Platinum; ARIA: Gold; MC: 3× Platinum
Who I Am	Release date: June 28, 1994; Label: Arista Nashville	1	5	1	8	—	—	RIAA: 4× Platinum; ARIA: Gold; MC: 2× Platinum
Everything I Love	Release date: October 29, 1996; Label: Arista Nashville	1	12	1	29	76	192	RIAA: 3× Platinum; ARIA: Gold
High Mileage	Release date: September 1, 1998; Label: Arista Nashville	1	4	1	28	32	—	RIAA: Platinum; MC: Platinum
Under the Influence	Release date: October 26, 1999; Label: Arista Nashville	2	9	4	36	—	—	RIAA: Platinum
"—" denotes releases that did not chart

=== 2000s ===
Title	Details	Peak chart positions							Certifications (sales threshold)
Title	Details	US Country	US	CAN	AUS	NOR	SWI	UK	Certifications (sales threshold)
When Somebody Loves You	Release date: November 7, 2000; Label: Arista Nashville	1	15	—	—	—	—	—	RIAA: Platinum; MC: Gold
Drive	Release date: January 15, 2002; Label: Arista Nashville	1	1	1	33	11	—	191	RIAA: 4× Platinum; ARIA: Gold; MC: Platinum
What I Do	Release date: September 7, 2004; Label: Arista Nashville	1	1	2	39	10	—	183	RIAA: Platinum
Like Red on a Rose	Release date: September 26, 2006; Label: Arista Nashville	1	4	8	41	11	—	177	RIAA: Gold
Good Time	Release date: March 4, 2008; Label: Arista Nashville	1	1	3	21	2	66	124	RIAA: Platinum; ARIA: Gold; MC: Gold
"—" denotes releases that did not chart

=== 2010s and 2020s ===
Title	Details	Peak chart positions								Sales
Title	Details	US Country	US	AUS	CAN	NOR	SWE	SWI	UK	Sales
Freight Train	Release date: March 30, 2010; Label: Arista Nashville	2	7	25	8	2	32	65	142	US: 168,000
Thirty Miles West	Release date: June 5, 2012; Label: ACR/EMI Nashville	1	2	6	4	14	45	—	95	
The Bluegrass Album (Note: The Bluegrass Album also peaked at number 1 on the Top Bluegrass Albums chart)	Release date: September 24, 2013; Label: ACR/EMI Nashville	3	11	18	—	—	—	—	—	US: 148,000
Angels and Alcohol	Release date: July 17, 2015; Label: ACR/EMI Nashville	1	5	4	4	38	—	—	85	US: 135,500
Where Have You Gone	Release date: May 14, 2021; Label: ACR/EMI Nashville	2	9	14	33	—	—	—	—	
"—" denotes releases that did not chart

=== Christmas albums ===
Title	Details	Peak chart positions				Certifications	Sales
Title	Details	US Country	US Christ	US	US Holiday	Certifications	Sales
Honky Tonk Christmas	Release date: October 12, 1993; Label: Arista Nashville	7	—	42	4	RIAA: 2× Platinum	US: 1,324,800
Let It Be Christmas	Release date: October 22, 2002; Label: Arista Nashville	6	3	27	2	RIAA: Platinum	

=== Gospel albums ===
Title	Details	Peak chart positions			Sales	Certifications
Title	Details	US Country	US	US Christ	Sales	Certifications
Precious Memories	Release date: February 28, 2006; Label: Arista Nashville	1	4	1	US: 389,600	RIAA: Platinum
Precious Memories Volume II	Release date: March 26, 2013; Label: ACR/EMI Nashville	2	5	1	US: 453,200	

== Compilation albums ==
Title	Details	Peak chart positions								Certifications / Sales
Title	Details	US Country	US	US Christ	AUS	CAN	NOR	NZ	UK	Certifications / Sales
The Greatest Hits Collection (Note: The Greatest Hits Collection also peaked at number 1 on the RPM Country Albums chart)	Release date: October 24, 1995; Label: Arista Nashville	1	5	—	46	14	—	45	—	RIAA: 6× Platinum; ARIA: Platinum; BPI: Gold; MC: 4× Platinum
Super Hits	Release date: March 23, 1999; Label: Arista Nashville	44	—	—	—	—	—	—	—	
Greatest Hits Volume II... and Some Other Stuff	Release date: August 12, 2003; Label: Arista Nashville	1	1	—	—	—	—	—	—	
Greatest Hits Volume II	Release date: December 16, 2003; Label: Arista Nashville	2	19	—	24	2	3	—	47	RIAA: 7× Platinum; MC: 4× Platinum
The Very Best of Alan Jackson	Release date: June 14, 2004; Label: Sony BMG International	—	—	—	—	—	—	—	—	ARIA: Platinum
16 Biggest Hits	Release date: August 7, 2007; Label: Arista Nashville	22	147	—	—	—	—	—	—	RIAA: Gold
Collections	Release date: May 2008; Label: Arista Nashville	—	—	—	78	—	—	—	—	
Norwegian Favorites	Release date: 2009; Label: Arista Nashville / Sony Music	—	—	—	—	—	1	—	—	
Songs of Love and Heartache	Release date: November 2, 2009; Label: Cracker Barrel	10	34	—	—	—	—	—	—	
34 Number Ones	Release date: November 23, 2010; Label: Arista Nashville	7	37	—	7	40	—	—	—	RIAA: Gold; ARIA: Platinum; BPI: Gold
The Essential Alan Jackson	Release date: April 17, 2012; Label: Arista Nashville/Legacy	20	145	—	—	—	—	—	—	
Playlist: The Very Best of Alan Jackson	Release date: October 9, 2012; Label: Arista Nashville/Legacy	19	146	—	—	40	—	—	—	US: 266,100
Genuine: The Alan Jackson Story	Release date: November 6, 2015; Label: Arista Nashville/Legacy	19	—	—	41	—	—	—	—	
Precious Memories Collection	Release date: November 6, 2015; Label: Arista Nashville/Legacy	4	33	1	—	—	—	—	—	US: 390,000
"—" denotes releases that did not chart

== Live albums ==
Title	Details	Peak chart positions	
Title	Details	US Country	US
Live at Texas Stadium (with George Strait and Jimmy Buffett)	Release date: April 3, 2007; Label: Mailboat Records	4	11

== Video albums ==
Title	Details	Certifications (sales threshold)
Here in the Reel World	Released: July 1, 1991; Label: Arista Nashville	RIAA: Gold
Livin', Lovin', and Rockin' That Jukebox	Released: October 26, 1993; Label: Arista Nashville	RIAA: Platinum
The Greatest Hits Video Collection	Released: November 21, 1995; Label: Arista Nashville	RIAA: Platinum
Greatest Hits Volume II, Disc 1	Released: August 12, 2003; Label: Arista Nashville	RIAA: Platinum
Greatest Hits Volume II, Disc 2	Released: February 10, 2004; Label: Arista Nashville	RIAA: Gold
Precious Memories: Live at the Ryman	Released: April 14, 2009; Label: Arista Nashville	
