= Songs of Love and Heartache =

Greatest hits album by Alan Jackson
- Released: November 2, 2009
- Genre: Country
- Length: 43:29
- Label: Arista Nashville / Cracker Barrel
- Producers: Keith Stegall, Alison Krauss

Alan Jackson chronology
Good Time (2008)	Songs of Love and Heartache (2009)	Freight Train (2010)

Songs of Love and Heartache is the sixth greatest hits compilation album by American country artist Alan Jackson. It was released in the United States on November 2, 2009 on the Arista Nashville and Cracker Barrel labels. The album itself contains 12 songs, which consists of 7 singles, 3 album tracks, and 2 previously unreleased songs.

== Critical reception ==
Stephen Thomas Erlewine of AllMusic writes, "Released exclusively through Cracker Barrel, the 2009 compilation Songs of Love & Heartache delivers upon its title's promise, serving up 12 tunes of romance won and lost, including two perfectly fine previously unreleased cuts."

== Track listing ==
All tracks are written by Alan Jackson, unless otherwise noted.

No.	Title	Writer(s)	Original Album	Length
1.	"Here in the Real World"	Mark Irwin, Jackson	Here in the Real World (1989)	3:40
2.	"She's Got the Rhythm (And I Got the Blues)"	Jackson, Randy Travis	A Lot About Livin' (And a Little 'bout Love) (1992)	2:25
3.	"Tropical Depression"	Charlie Craig, Jackson, Jim McBride	A Lot About Livin' (And a Little 'bout Love)	2:58
4.	"Livin' on Love"		Who I Am (1994)	3:49
5.	"You Can't Give Up on Love"		Who I Am	3:07
6.	"Gone Crazy"		High Mileage (1998)	3:48
7.	"When Somebody Loves You"		When Somebody Loves You (2000)	3:29
8.	"Remember When"		Greatest Hits Volume II… and Some Other Stuff (2003)	4:31
9.	"Rainy Day in June"		What I Do (2004)	4:41
10.	"A Woman's Love"		Like Red on a Rose (2006)	4:15
11.	"That's What I'd Be Like Without You"	Jackson, Don Sampson	New Song	2:58
12.	"Nothing Sure Looked Good on You"	Jim Rushing	New Song	3:48
Total length:				43:29

- Track information and credits verified from Discogs and the album's liner notes.

== Charts and certifications ==
Songs of Love and Heartache debuted at number 34 on the US Billboard 200 for the week of November 21, 2009, where it stayed for one week.

== Charts ==
Chart (2009)	Peak position
US Top Country Albums (Billboard)	10
US Billboard 200	34
