= 16 Biggest Hits (Alan Jackson album) =

Greatest hits album by Alan Jackson
- Released: August 7, 2007
- Genre: Country
- Length: 58:35
- Label: Arista Nashville/Legacy Recordings
- Producer: Al Quaglieri

Alan Jackson chronology
Live at Texas Stadium (2007)	16 Biggest Hits (2007)	Good Time (2008)

Professional ratings
Review scores
Source	Rating
AllMusic	4/5 stars

16 Biggest Hits is the fifth greatest hits compilation album by American country music artist Alan Jackson. It is part of a series of similar 16 Biggest Hits albums released by Legacy Recordings. It has sold 446,000 copies in the United States as of May 2013.

== Track listing ==
No.	Title	Writer(s)	Length
1.	"Chattahoochee"	Alan Jackson, Jim McBride	3:59
2.	"Gone Country"	Bob McDill	4:20
3.	"It Must Be Love"	McDill	2:52
4.	"Midnight in Montgomery"	A. Jackson, Don Sampson	3:47
5.	"Chasin' That Neon Rainbow"	A. Jackson, McBride	3:07
6.	"Don't Rock the Jukebox"	A. Jackson, Roger Murrah, Keith Stegall	2:53
7.	"Mercury Blues"	K. C. Douglas, Robert Geddins	3:40
8.	"Here in the Real World"	Mark Irwin, Jackson	3:40
9.	"Pop a Top"	Nat Stuckey	3:06
10.	"That'd Be Alright"	Tim Nichols, Mark D. Sanders, Tia Sillers	3:43
11.	"I Don't Even Know Your Name"	A. Jackson, Ron Jackson, Andy Loftin	3:53
12.	"Gone Crazy"	A. Jackson	3:50
13.	"I'll Go On Loving You"	Kieran Kane	4:00
14.	"Little Man"	A. Jackson	4:30
15.	"Who's Cheatin' Who"	Jerry Hayes	4:02
16.	"Summertime Blues"	Jerry Capehart, Eddie Cochran	3:12
Total length:			58:35

== Chart performance ==
16 Biggest Hits peaked at #22 on the U.S. Billboard Top Country Albums chart the week of August 25, 2007. It also peaked at #141 on the Billboard 200 the week of March 22, 2008.

=== Weekly charts ===
Chart (2007–08)	Peak position
US Billboard 200	141
US Top Country Albums (Billboard)	22

=== Year-end charts ===
Chart (2008)	Position
US Top Country Albums (Billboard)	50

== Certifications ==
Certifications for 16 Biggest Hits
Region	Certification	Certified units/sales
United States (RIAA)	Gold	500,000^{‡}
^{‡} Sales+streaming figures based on certification alone.
