= Playlist: The Very Best of Alan Jackson =

Compilation album by Alan Jackson
- Released: October 9, 2012
- Genre: Country
- Length: 50:20
- Label: Legacy Recordings
- Producer: Various

Alan Jackson chronology
| Thirty Miles West (2012) | Playlist: The Very Best of Alan Jackson (2012) | Precious Memories Volume II (2013) |

Professional ratings
Review scores
| Source | Rating |
|---|---|
| AllMusic | 4/5 stars |

Playlist: The Very Best of Alan Jackson is the eighth greatest hits compilation album by American country music artist Alan Jackson. It is part of a series of similar Playlist albums issued by Legacy Recordings. The album features thirteen of Jackson's singles spanning from "Here in the Real World" in 1990 to "Monday Morning Church" from What I Do in 2004. Also included is "Never Loved Before", a duet with Martina McBride from Jackson's 2008 album Good Time.

== Critical reception ==
Stephen Thomas Erlewine of AllMusic gave the album four stars out of five, calling it "a good sampling of [Jackson's] new millennium staples."

== Commercial performance ==
Playlist: The Very Best of Alan Jackson peaked at number 19 on the U.S. Billboard Top Country Albums chart. It also peaked at number 146 on the Billboard 200. The album has sold 266,100 copies in the United States as of October 2019.

== Track listing ==
| No. | Title | Writer(s) | Original Album | Length |
|---|---|---|---|---|
| 1. | "Where I Come From" | Alan Jackson | When Somebody Loves You [2000] | 3:59 |
| 2. | "It Must Be Love" | Bob McDill | Under the Influence [1999] | 2:52 |
| 3. | "Never Loved Before" (with Martina McBride) | Jackson | Good Time [2008] | 3:31 |
| 4. | "Livin' on Love" | Jackson | Who I Am [1994] | 3:49 |
| 5. | "Here in the Real World" | Jackson, Mark Irwin | Here in the Real World [1989] | 3:38 |
| 6. | "Someday" | Jackson, Jim McBride | Don't Rock the Jukebox [1991] | 3:18 |
| 7. | "Dallas" | Jackson, Keith Stegall | Don't Rock the Jukebox [1991] | 2:45 |
| 8. | "She's Got the Rhythm (And I Got the Blues)" | Jackson, Randy Travis | A Lot About Livin' (And a Little 'Bout Love) [1992] | 2:24 |
| 9. | "Gone Country" | McDill | Who I Am [1994] | 4:21 |
| 10. | "There Goes" | Jackson | Everything I Love [1996] | 3:56 |
| 11. | "It's Five O'Clock Somewhere" (with Jimmy Buffett) | Jim "Moose" Brown, Don Rollins | Greatest Hits Volume II [2003] | 3:51 |
| 12. | "Drive (For Daddy Gene)" | Jackson | Drive [2002] | 4:03 |
| 13. | "Monday Morning Church" | Brent Baxter, Erin Enderlin | What I Do [2004] | 3:23 |
| 14. | "Remember When" | Jackson | Greatest Hits Volume II [2003] | 4:30 |

== Charts ==
| Chart (2012) | Peak position |
|---|---|
| U.S. Billboard 200 | 146 |
| U.S. Billboard Top Country Albums | 19 |
