= So You Don't Have to Love Me Anymore =

Single by Alan Jackson

from the album Thirty Miles West
- Released: January 16, 2012
- Recorded: 2011
- Genre: Country
- Length: 3:44
- Label: Alan's Country Records/ EMI Records Nashville
- Songwriters: Jay Knowles; Adam Wright
- Producer: Keith Stegall

Alan Jackson singles chronology
"Long Way to Go" (2011)	"So You Don't Have to Love Me Anymore" (2012)	"You Go Your Way" (2012)

"So You Don't Have to Love Me Anymore" is a song recorded by American country music artist Alan Jackson. It was released in January 2012 as the second single from Jackson's album Thirty Miles West. The song was written by Jay Knowles and Jackson's nephew, Adam Wright (of The Wrights). The song was nominated for Best Country Song at the 55th Annual Grammy Awards.

== Critical reception ==
Billy Dukes of Taste of Country gave the song four and a half stars out of five, writing that "the best songs always allow a listener to fill in the spaces between the words, and Jackson's patient performance leaves plenty of room to do that." Kyle Ward of Roughstock also gave the song four and a half stars out of five, saying "Jackson offers up his most heart-felt vocal since 'Monday Morning Church,' and the soft neo-traditional production serves as quite a breath of fresh air."

Kevin John Coyne of Country Universe gave the song an A grade, writing that it "ranks among his best work, and given that he's one of the genre's all time greats, that's heavy company for it to be in." The song also received a "thumbs up" from Engine 145 reviewer Juli Thanki, who called it "his best single in at least half a decade."

== Music video ==
The music video, which premiered in January 2012, was directed by Steven Goldmann and filmed at Coney Island. The video is Alan Jackson's second time in which he appears without his trademark mustache, the first being in 1993's "Tonight I Climbed the Wall"

== Chart performance ==
"So You Don't Have to Love Me Anymore" debuted at number 58 on the U.S. Billboard Hot Country Songs chart for the week of January 28, 2012.

Chart (2012)	Peak position
US Hot Country Songs (Billboard)	25
US Billboard Bubbling Under Hot 100	8
Canada Country (Billboard)	42

=== Year-end charts ===
Chart (2012)	Position
US Country Songs (Billboard)	85
