= Good Time (Alan Jackson song) =

- Cover for the "dance mix"

Single by Alan Jackson

from the album Good Time
- Released: April 21, 2008
- Genre: Country
- Length: 5:06 (Album Version); 3:39 (Radio Edit); 4:46 (Dance Mix)
- Label: Arista Nashville
- Songwriter: Alan Jackson
- Producer: Keith Stegall

Alan Jackson singles chronology
"Small Town Southern Man" (2007)	"Good Time" (2008)	"Country Boy" (2008)

"Good Time" is a song written and recorded by American country music singer Alan Jackson. It is the title track and second single from his album Good Time, having been released on April 21, 2008. Overall, it is his forty-eighth Top Ten hit on the Billboard Hot Country Songs charts and his twenty-fourth Number One hit. This song is used in the Rock Band Country Track Pack, and has been confirmed as upcoming downloadable content for the Rock Band series.

== Content ==
"Good Time" is an up-tempo song in which the narrator claims that he is tired after a week of working, and wants to have a party because "all the conditions are right".

After the first verse, the lyrics list off the various details of the party, such as "a shot of tequila, beer on tap / Sweet Southern woman to sit on my lap". The lyrics also contain references to "All My Rowdy Friends Are Coming Over Tonight" by Hank Williams, Jr. and "Boot Scootin' Boogie" by Brooks & Dunn. The radio edit omits two verses. Jackson also released a remix called the "Too Hot to Fish" mix, which increases the rhythm section.

As with all the other songs on the album, Jackson wrote "Good Time" himself. Describing the song in an article for Country Weekly magazine, he said, "I've just always written things that are simpler… just things that I like and my fans still like… [Fans] would just rather have something that makes their day easier."

== Music video ==
The music video for "Good Time" showed Jackson and his band playing the song, as hundreds of people formed a huge line dance. Local television coverage clips showing that Jackson was attempting to set the record for longest line dance were included. The televised news coverage and line dance record attempt were fictional and performed by actors for dramatic purposes. This video was directed by Trey Fanjoy. However, after about 6 months on the TV, the channels cut it short, by replacing it with the radio version, cutting off the outro, & using a different intro, with Jay Leno in the beginning. The late George Jones made a cameo in the video with his wife Nancy Jones. Alan's wife, Denise Jackson, made a cameo at the end of the video where her unidentified character plays the role of picking Alan up in a convertible sports car.

== Critical reception ==
Reviewer Matt C. of Engine 145, a country music blog, gave "Good Time" a "thumbs down" review, as he thought that its list-format lyrics were a "crutch" that Jackson was using. Although he commended Jackson's "classy and genuine" vocal performance, he nonetheless considered the song lacking in "the kind of sentiment that characterized 'Small Town Southern Man'". Adam Tamburin from the same site gave the song a more positive review in his review of the album, stating that the song "[shook] the cobwebs from Jackson's lighthearted side", which he thought had been downplayed on Jackson's more somber offerings (such as Precious Memories, his first gospel album).

Initially, Jackson had wanted "Good Time" to be the first single from the album, because he had largely avoided up-tempo songs for the past several years, and wanted to put out "somethin' a little more fun [and] up-tempo." However, the staff at his label decided to release "Small Town Southern Man" first, as it was "more typical of what people expect" of him. "Good Time" was then chosen as the second single, because it was thought that an up-tempo song would work well for the summertime.

== Chart performance ==
"Good Time" debuted at number 42 on the U.S. Billboard Hot Country Songs chart dated April 18, 2008. On the chart week of August 2, 2008, it reached Number One, giving Jackson the twenty-fourth Number One country hit of his career. The song peaked at number 40 on the Billboard Hot 100, giving Jackson his last (to date) top 40 hit.

Chart (2008)	Peak position
US Hot Country Songs (Billboard)	1
US Billboard Hot 100	40
Canada Country (Billboard)	1
Canada Hot 100 (Billboard)	57

=== Year-end charts ===
Chart (2008)	Position
US Country Songs (Billboard)	12
Canada Country (Billboard)	1

== Certifications ==
Region	Certification	Certified units/sales
United States (RIAA)	2× Platinum	2,000,000^{‡}
^{‡} Sales+streaming figures based on certification alone.
