= USA Today (disambiguation) =

USA Today is an American newspaper, founded in 1982.

USA Today may also refer to:

- USA Today (magazine), an American periodical
- "USA Today" (song), by Alan Jackson, 2005
