= I Love to Tell the Story =

Poem by Katherine Hankey

- Hymn
- Written: 1866
- Text: by Katherine Hankey
- Meter: 7.6.7.6 D with refrain
- Melody: by William G. Fischer
- Published: 1869: Philadelphia
- Publisher: Methodist Episcopal book Room

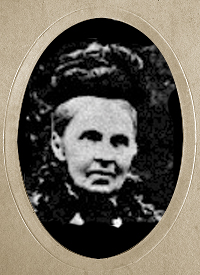
Katherine Hankey, lyricist for "I Love to Tell the Story"

"I Love to Tell the Story" is a well-known hymn which was written as a poem by an English evangelist, Katherine Hankey. It was set to music by William G. Fischer.

Hankey had a serious spell of sickness while on a mission in Africa. During her long days of convalescence, she wrote a long piece on the life of Jesus in 1866 in two parts. The first part was a poem of fifty stanzas titled "The Story Wanted" (dated 29 January 1866), and second part titled "The Story Told" (dated 18 November 1866).

Certain verses were taken from Part I. by Dr. W. H. Doane in 1867 to make the popular and familiar hymn beginning, "Tell me the old, old story". From Part II. certain verses were selected to make the hymn, "I Love to Tell the Story".

The tune was composed by William G. Fischer, a professor of music at Girard College, Philadelphia, PA and appeared in Fischer's Joyful Songs, Nos. 1 to 3 published in 1869 in Philadelphia, Pennsylvania by Methodist Episcopal Book Room.

The refrain used was

"I love to tell the story, 'twill be my theme in glory,
To tell the old, old story of Jesus and His love.

== In recordings ==
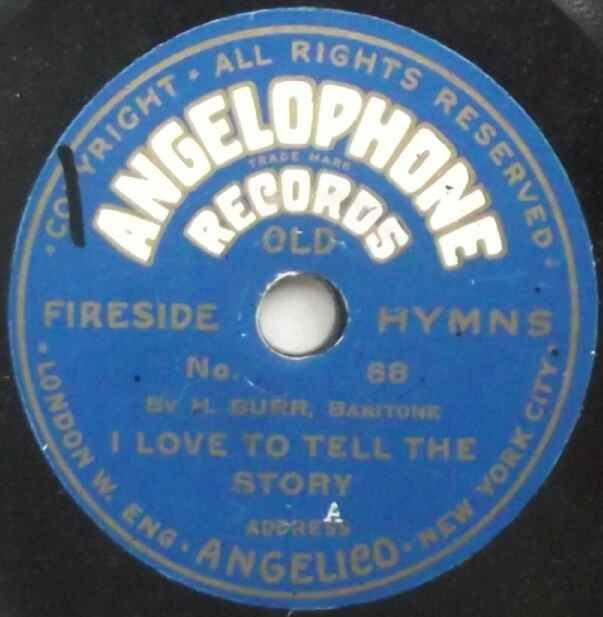

- Henry Burr recorded it c. 1916 for Angelophone Records (pictured)
- Country singer Alan Jackson included it in his 2006 Gospel album Precious Memories.
- Christian singer Mark Lowry made it the title track of his Christian hymns album I Love to Tell the Story, A Hymns Collection released July 17, 2007
