= Anthony Johnson Showalter =

American composer (1858–1924)

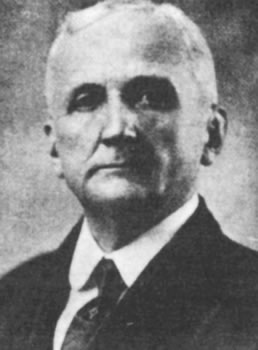

Anthony Johnson Showalter (May 1, 1858 – September 14, 1924) was an American gospel music composer, teacher and publisher. He was born in Cherry Grove, West Virginia. Showalter was trained in the Ruebush-Kieffer School of Music and was teaching in shape note singing schools by age fourteen. In 1880 he became principal of the Southern Normal Musical Institute. His students included hymn author and composer Emma Pitt. In 1884, he formed the Showalter Music Company of Dalton, Georgia. He was also an elder of the First Presbyterian Church in Dalton.

Showalter's best known song is "Leaning on the Everlasting Arms,” which was published in 1887. He has generally been credited with writing the music and chorus. However, Showalter's nephew, Samuel Duncan, is also credited with some of the music for the verses. Elisha Hoffman wrote some of the verses. The song features prominently in the score of Night of the Hunter, serving as a leitmotif for Robert Mitchum's character Reverend Harry Powell, and forms about a quarter of the score of the 2010 film True Grit.

Showalter authored several rudimentary books on music theory and a book on harmony and song composition. These were widely used in singing schools across the South.

He died in Chattanooga, Tennessee in 1924 and is buried at West Hill Cemetery in Dalton.
