= You Go Your Way (disambiguation) =

"You Go Your Way" is a song by Perrie.

You Go Your Way may also refer to:

- "You Go Your Way" (Alan Jackson song)
- You Go Your Way, a 2009 album by Amy Correia
- "You Go Your Way (and I'll Go Crazy)", a song written by Bob Russell
- You Go Your Way, a 1941 novel by Katharine Brush

== See also ==
- Most Likely You Go Your Way and I'll Go Mine, a song by Bob Dylan
