= Leaning on the Everlasting Arms =

Hymn

- by Anthony J. Showalter and Elisha Hoffman
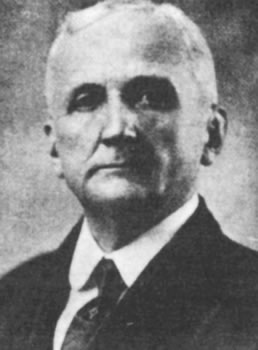
- A. J. Showalter
- Genre: Hymn
- Based on: Deuteronomy 33:27
- Meter: 10.9.10.9 with refrain
- Melody: Anthony J. Showalter
- Published: 1887 in The Glad Evangel/The Song Evangel by A. J. Showalter & Co.

Leaning on the Everlasting Arms is a hymn published in 1887 with music by Anthony J. Showalter and lyrics by Showalter and Elisha Hoffman. It is most commonly played in the key of A-flat major.

Showalter said that he received letters from two of his former pupils saying that their wives had died. When writing letters of consolation, Showalter was inspired by the phrase in the Book of Deuteronomy 33:27, "The eternal God is thy refuge, and underneath are the everlasting arms".

== Lyrics ==
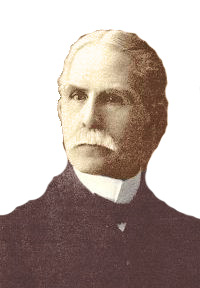
Elisha Hoffman

Showalter wrote the lyrics to the refrain in Hartselle, Alabama and asked Hoffman to write the remaining lyrics.

What a fellowship, what a joy divine,
Leaning on the everlasting arms;
What a blessedness, what a peace is mine,
Leaning on the everlasting arms.

Refrain:

Leaning, leaning, safe and secure from all alarms;
Leaning, leaning, leaning on the everlasting arms.

O how sweet to walk, In this pilgrim way,
Leaning on the everlasting arms;
O how bright the path grows from day to day,
Leaning on the everlasting arms.

Refrain

What have I to dread, what have I to fear,
Leaning on the everlasting arms;
I have blessed peace with my Lord so near,
Leaning on the everlasting arms.

Refrain

Alternate version

There is an alternate version of the refrain, typically sung by basses:

Leaning on Jesus, leaning on Jesus, safe and secure from all alarms;
Leaning on Jesus, leaning on Jesus, leaning on the everlasting arms.

== Versions ==
It has been performed and recorded by such artists as Roy Clark, Iris DeMent, Mahalia Jackson, George Jones, Twila Paris, Selah and Norbert Susemihl.

Alan Jackson included it in his 2006 live gospel album Precious Memories.

mewithoutyou uses the lyrics from the 3rd stanza and part of the 2nd in their song Watermelon Ascot from their Pale Horses album.

The Carter Family performed the hymn during their time on Mexican Radio Stations in the late 1930s and early 1940s.

Brian Fallon included it in his 2021 studio album Night Divine.

Chanel Beads released a video of their recording of the hymn on YouTube in December 2024.

== In popular culture ==
The song has been used in several movies, including The Human Comedy (1943), Native Son (1950), The Night of the Hunter (1955), Phase IV (1974), Wild Bill (1995), Next of Kin (1989), True Grit (2010) (of which it forms about a quarter of the score), First Reformed (2017), and Her Story (2024).

In television, it was used in the Dollhouse season one episode "True Believer". It was also used in the House of Cards episode "Chapter 42" (season 4, episode 3), in the Law and Order: Special Victims Unit episode "Pattern Seventeen" (season 16, episode 9), in Justified (season 4, episode 5, "Kin") and in The Simpsons episode "The Yellow Badge of Cowardge" (season 25, episode 22). It was also sung in an episode of The Andy Griffith Show, "Mountain Wedding" (Season 3, Episode 31), during the wedding scene.

It was also used in a Guinness beer commercial titled "Empty Chair" which was produced by Human Worldwide Inc. and in a 2014 Sainsbury's ad regarding the World War I "Christmas Truce" of 1914.
