= Sissy's Song =

Single by Alan Jackson

from the album Good Time
- Released: March 2, 2009
- Genre: Country
- Length: 3:02
- Label: Arista Nashville
- Songwriter: Alan Jackson
- Producer: Keith Stegall

Alan Jackson singles chronology
"Country Boy" (2008)	"Sissy's Song" (2009)	"I Still Like Bologna" (2009)

"Sissy's Song" is a song written and recorded by American country music singer Alan Jackson. It was released in March 2009 as the fourth single from his album Good Time, and his fifty-sixth single release overall (and to date his last top ten hit). Jackson wrote the song after the sudden death of a housekeeper that worked at his house.

== Composition ==
"Sissy's Song" is an acoustic mid-tempo country ballad, written by Jackson as a tribute to a housekeeper named Leslie "Sissy" Fitzgerald, who worked daily at Jackson's house. Jackson wrote the song after Sissy died in a motorcycle accident on May 20, 2007. He then went to the recording studio, and working with longtime producer Keith Stegall, made a recording of the song with just his vocals and steel-string acoustic guitar to be played for the family at her funeral. The song expresses Jackson's feeling for Sissy, in addition to hoping that "she flew up to heaven on the wings of angels."

== Critical reception ==
Karlie Justus, of Engine 145, gave the song a "thumbs up" rating. She said that the song was both "deeply personal and universally relatable", and that it showed his sense for simplicity and authenticity. However, she considered some of the lyrics stilted and cliché in nature. Lynn Douglas, reviewing the song for Country Universe, gave it a B+ rating. She described the song as "a reflective and moving experience."

== Music video ==
The song's music video was directed by Scott Scovill. It is shot in black-and-white and is at a church and it features footage of Jackson performing the song. It was shot in a historic church, located south of Nashville.

== Charts ==
"Sissy's Song" debuted at number 45 on the U.S. Billboard Hot Country Songs for the chart week of February 28, 2009.

Chart (2009)	Peak position
US Hot Country Songs (Billboard)	9
US Billboard Hot 100	61
Canada Country (Billboard)	6
Canada Hot 100 (Billboard)	67

== Certifications ==
Certifications for Sissy's Song
Region	Certification	Certified units/sales
United States (RIAA)	Gold	500,000^{‡}
^{‡} Sales+streaming figures based on certification alone.
