= Like Red on a Rose (song) =

Single by Alan Jackson

from the album Like Red on a Rose
- Released: July 24, 2006
- Genre: Country, soft rock
- Length: 3:32
- Label: Arista Nashville
- Songwriter: Robert Lee Castleman; Melanie Castleman
- Producer: Alison Krauss

Alan Jackson singles chronology
"USA Today" (2005)	"Like Red on a Rose" (2006)	"A Woman's Love" (2007)

"Like Red on a Rose" is a song written by Robert Lee Castleman and Melanie Castleman, and recorded by the American country music singer Alan Jackson. It was released in July 2006 as the first single and title track from Jackson's album Like Red on a Rose.

Alison Krauss, who produced the album, told Billboard that the song was "so positive and loving, yet it has a real dark melody".

== Critical reception ==
The song was nominated for a Grammy Award for Best Country Song at the 2006 Grammy Awards.

== Chart performance ==
"Like Red on a Rose" debuted at number 42 on the U.S. Billboard Hot Country Songs charts dated for the week ending July 29, 2006. It spent 20 weeks on that chart and peaked at number 15.

Chart (2006)	Peak position
US Hot Country Songs (Billboard)	15
US Billboard Hot 100	80
