= Long Way to Go (Alan Jackson song) =

Single by Alan Jackson

from the album Thirty Miles West
- Released: June 27, 2011
- Genre: Country
- Length: 3:39
- Label: Alan's Country Records/EMI Records Nashville
- Songwriter: Alan Jackson
- Producer: Keith Stegall

Alan Jackson singles chronology
"Ring of Fire" (2010)	"Long Way to Go" (2011)	"So You Don't Have to Love Me Anymore" (2012)

"Long Way to Go" is a song written and recorded by American country music artist Alan Jackson. It was released in June 2011 as the lead-off single from his seventeenth studio album Thirty Miles West, and debut on his new label EMI Records Nashville. The song reached number 24 on the Billboard Hot Country Songs chart.

== Background ==
When Alan Jackson was asked of his self-penned song he stated, "Seems like every time you turn around lately there's just something heavy going on in the world, so I felt like singing something that was kind of light and fun. When asked about the story behind this song during an interview with Country Weekly, Jackson replied, "It's just a fun summertime song. I had something to drink one time and a bug flew in it and I kinda made a note of that. Some people have asked if I was sitting someplace warm or near a beach when I was writing it, but I was actually in Nashville and it was pretty cold!"

== Critical reception ==
Kevin John Coyne of Country Universe gave the song a B, stating that, "More than twenty years in, Alan Jackson’s sounding as great as ever, delivering a vocal that’s all charm, personality and general tunefulness."

Billy Dukes of Taste of Country gave the song 2 out of 5 stars. He states that, this is the next page in the same book from Jackson. After his last few singles (‘Hard Hat and a Hammer,’ ‘It’s Just That Way,’ ‘I Still Like Bologna’) failed to gather much attention on country radio, people began to wonder if he was saving his best material for his new label. Sadly, the answer so far is ‘no.’ While his musings of simple life were once charming and cozy, they now seem lazy and dated."

== Music video ==
A music video for "Long Way to Go" was released in 2011 and was directed by Steven Goldmann. The tiki bar featured in the video is the Square Grouper Tiki Bar in Jupiter, Florida.

== Chart performance ==
Chart (2011)	Peak position
US Hot Country Songs (Billboard)	24
US Billboard Bubbling Under Hot 100	20
Canada Country (Billboard)	25

=== Year-end charts ===
Chart (2011)	Position
US Country Songs (Billboard)	86
