= I Love to Tell the Story, A Hymns Collection =

Studio album by Mark Lowry
- Released: July 17, 2007
- Recorded: September 19, 2005 – April 8, 2006
- Genre: CCM, Gospel
- Label: EMI Christian Music Group

Professional ratings
Review scores
Source	Rating
Allmusic	(not rated) link

I Love to Tell the Story, A Hymns Collection is a studio album released by Christian singer Mark Lowry. The album was released by EMI Christian Music Group on July 17, 2007. The album features renditions of several traditional and popular Christian hymns.

== Track listing ==
1. "I Love to Tell the Story" (William Fischer, Katherine Hankey) – 1:40
2. "In the Garden / O, How I Love Jesus" (Charles A. Miles, Frederick Whitfield) – 4:29
3. "Count Your Blessings" (E.O. Excell, Johnson Oatman) – 3:04
4. "The Old Rugged Cross" (George Bennard) – 4:15
5. "Softly and Tenderly" (Will L. Thompson) – 3:40
6. "Marvelous Grace (Grace Greater Than Our Sin)" (Julia Johnston, Daniel B. Towner) – 3:14
7. Heaven Medley: "When the Roll Is Called Up Yonder / In the Sweet By-and-By" (Sanford Bennett, James Black, Joseph P. Webster) – 3:50
8. "What a Friend We Have in Jesus" (Charles Converse, Joseph M. Scriven) – 2:54
9. "Blessed Assurance" (Fanny J. Crosby, Phoebe P. Knapp) – 4:22
10. "Does Jesus Care? / God Will Take Care of You" (Frank E. Graeff, J. Lincoln Hall, Civilla D. Martin, Walter Martin) – 4:49
11. "Untitled Hymn (Come to Jesus)" (Chris Rice) – 3:53

== Awards ==
The album won a Dove Award for Inspirational Album of the Year at the 39th GMA Dove Awards.

== Chart performance ==
The album peaked at No. 34 on Billboard's Christian Albums.
