= Song for the Life =

Single by Alan Jackson

from the album Who I Am
- B-side: "You Can't Give Up on Love"
- Released: February 6, 1995
- Genre: Country
- Length: 4:32 (album version); 3:58 (radio edit)
- Label: Arista Nashville 12792
- Songwriter: Rodney Crowell
- Producer: Keith Stegall

Alan Jackson singles chronology
"Gone Country" (1994)	"Song for the Life" (1995)	"I Don't Even Know Your Name" (1995)

"Song for the Life" is a song written by American singer Rodney Crowell and originally recorded by The Seldom Scene. Crowell recorded the song in 1978 on his debut album Ain't Living Long Like This, and since then, the song has been covered by several other artists. One version, recorded by Alan Jackson, was released as a single in 1995, and was a Top Ten country hit for him that year. It was on the Greatest hits video collection

== Recording history ==
The first version of "Song for the Life" was recorded by the Seldom Scene for their 1976 album The New Seldom Scene Album, with John Starling singing the lead. Singer-songwriter Jonathan Edwards also recorded the song for his 1976 release Rockin Chair, produced by Brian Ahern. The following year Rodney Crowell put it on his 1978 debut album Ain't Living Long Like This, with backing vocals from Willie Nelson, Emmylou Harris and Nicolette Larson. Crowell's version was released a single in November 1978. Jerry Jeff Walker covered the song on his 1977 album Man Must Carry On, as did Johnny Cash on his 1978 album Gone Girl, John Denver on his 1980 album Autograph, Waylon Jennings on his 1982 album Black on Black, Tony Rice on his 1983 album Cold on the Shoulder, and Kathy Mattea on her 1986 album Walk the Way the Wind Blows. Mattea's version of the song was the b-side to her 1987 single "You're the Power". Alison Krauss recorded the song on her debut album with Union Station in 1987, "Too Late to Cry" at the age of 16. A version was also recorded by The Waterboys for their album Room to Roam in 1990, although it wasn't released until 2008 on the remastered edition of the same album. However, the Waterboys version of the song did appear on the BBC television 1991 series "Bringing it all Back Home - the influence of Irish Music" and was released on the supporting CD and DVD of the series.

Alan Jackson recorded it for his 1994 album Who I Am. His version was released in February 1995 as a single, reaching a peak of number six on the Billboard Hot Country Songs charts.

== Critical reception ==
Jackson's rendition was given favorable reviews: Mario Tarradell of the Dallas Morning News called it "the quintessential Alan Jackson ballad", and Thom Jurek of Allmusic said, "in a version that rivals Crowell's own, Jackson's balladry in three-forths [sic] time is heartbreakingly beautiful." Ron Young of the San Antonio Express-News said that although it "pales next to Jerry Jeff Walker's, it's a good attempt and an excellent choice." In a retrospective review, Kevin John Coyne of Country Universe gave the song an "A" grade, writing that "The list of distinguished artists who have recorded “Song for the Life” is a long one, but Alan Jackson is the only one who managed to make a hit out of it. That radio played this pensive and philosophical ballad at all is a testament to Jackson’s incredible popularity at the time."

== Chart performance ==
Jackson's rendition debuted at number 73 on the Billboard Hot Country Singles & Tracks (now Hot Country Songs) charts dated for February 11, 1995. It peaked at number 6 on the week of May 6.

Chart (1995)	Peak position
Canada Country Singles (RPM)	11
US Hot Country Songs (Billboard)	6

=== Year-end charts ===
Chart (1995)	Position
US Country Songs (Billboard)	56
