= I Still Like Bologna =

Single by Alan Jackson

from the album Good Time
- Released: August 3, 2009
- Genre: Country
- Length: 4:39 (Album Version); 4:23 (Single Version)
- Label: Arista Nashville
- Songwriter: Alan Jackson
- Producer: Keith Stegall

Alan Jackson singles chronology
"Sissy's Song" (2009)	"I Still Like Bologna" (2009)	"It's Just That Way" (2010)

"I Still Like Bologna" is a song written and recorded by American country music artist Alan Jackson. It is the fifty-seventh single release of his career, and the fifth single from his album Good Time. The song was released to radio on August 3, 2009, and debuted at number 56 on the Billboard Hot Country Songs charts.

== Composition ==
As with all of the other songs on Good Time, Jackson wrote "I Still Like Bologna" himself. In the song, the narrator states that, although he owns many pieces of modern technology (such as a cell phone, plasma television, and laptop computer) and embraces technological advances, he still likes the simplicity of a bologna sandwich on white bread, or the scenery of a rural lifestyle.

Regarding the song's theme, Jackson said that the title "just sounded like the perfect way to say that I’m aware of all the modern technology and do adapt to some of it, and the health — better eating and diet policies — but every now and then, I still like that bologna on white bread."

== Critical reception ==
The song has been met with primarily negative reception. Jonathan Keefe of Slant Magazine said that the song "jettison[s] any serious attempts at reflection by simply reciting long lists of common points of reference," and Rolling Stone critic Rob Sheffield said that Jackson "goes overboard" on the song due to its length. Engine 145 critic Karlie Justus gave a thumbs-down review, saying that the song's premise "wears a thin [sic]", although her review also calls it "agreeable, likable album filler." In his Allmusic review, Stephen Thomas Erlewine gave a more favorable description, calling it "slightly gangly, tongue-in-cheek Western swing," and Bobby Peacock of Roughstock said, "While that list [of things that Jackson likes] may sound fairly pedestrian[…]every note seems to ring true here. The lyrics find Alan in his smoothest narrative mode[.]"

== Music video ==
The song's music video is directed by Scott Scovill. It was released to Country Music Television on August 20, 2009. On GAC's Top 50 Videos Of 2009, it was voted in at number 36.

== Chart performance ==
"I Still Like Bologna" debuted at number 56 on the U.S. Billboard Hot Country Songs charts dated for the week of August 8, 2009. The song reached a peak of number 32 in October 2009, making it Jackson's first single to miss Top 20 since "The Blues Man" in 2000.

Chart (2009)	Peak position
US Hot Country Songs (Billboard)	32
