= Tonight I Climbed the Wall =

Single by Alan Jackson

from the album A Lot About Livin' (And a Little 'bout Love)
- B-side: "Up to My Ears in Tears"
- Released: January 25, 1993
- Recorded: 1992
- Genre: Country
- Length: 3:30
- Label: Arista Nashville 12514
- Songwriter: Alan Jackson
- Producers: Scott Hendricks; Keith Stegall

Alan Jackson singles chronology
"She's Got the Rhythm (And I Got the Blues)" (1992)	"Tonight I Climbed the Wall" (1993)	"Chattahoochee" (1993)

"Tonight I Climbed the Wall" is a song written and recorded by American country music artist Alan Jackson. It was released in January 1993 as the second single from his album A Lot About Livin' (And a Little 'bout Love). It peaked at number 4 on both the United States Billboard Hot Country Singles & Tracks chart and the Canadian RPM Country Tracks chart.

== Content ==
The song discusses a couple that had been fighting. They had built a wall between them with all of the arguing and now the man in the song climbed that wall. He put all the disagreements behind them and went to his wife. After he made the climb and admitted his faults, he realized the things they were fighting over were small and unimportant.

== Music video ==
The music video was directed by Jim Shea, is entirely in black and white, and premiered in early 1993. It switches between scenes of Alan performing live and a woman walking around on a farm. This is one of only twice when Jackson appears without his trademark mustache, the second time being in the music video for "So You Don't Have to Love Me Anymore" in 2012.

== Chart positions ==
"Tonight I Climbed the Wall" debuted at number 73 on the Hot Country Singles & Tracks chart for the week of February 6, 1993.

Chart (1993)	Peak position
Canada Country Singles (RPM)	4
US Hot Country Songs (Billboard)	4

=== Year-end charts ===
Chart (1993)	Position
Canada Country Tracks (RPM)	57
US Country Songs (Billboard)	53
