= The Talkin' Song Repair Blues =

Single by Alan Jackson

from the album What I Do
- Released: March 21, 2005
- Recorded: 2004
- Genre: Country
- Length: 2:58
- Label: Arista Nashville
- Songwriter: Dennis Linde
- Producer: Keith Stegall

Alan Jackson singles chronology
"Monday Morning Church" (2004)	"The Talkin' Song Repair Blues" (2005)	"USA Today" (2005)

"The Talkin' Song Repair Blues" is a song written by Dennis Linde, and recorded by American country music artist Alan Jackson. It was released in March 2005 as the third single from his album What I Do. It peaked at No. 18 on the United States Billboard Hot Country Songs chart.

== Content ==
A songwriter brings his automobile into a repair shop for maintenance; the mechanic on duty inspects the vehicle and determines it needs extensive minor repairs, adding up to $800. The mechanic recognizes that his customer is a prominent Nashville songwriter and asks to have a song that he wrote looked over. The songwriter agrees but, tongue in cheek, assesses that the song has numerous musical flaws, using much of the same language the mechanic used on him; the songwriter offers to fix the song for about $900. Jackson said that he and producer Keith Stegall had intended to record the song for a minimum of two previous albums before it was finally included on What I Do.

== Critical reception ==
Deborah Evans Price, of Billboard magazine reviewed the song favorably, saying that Jackson "has a chance to exact a little justice, by working on his song." She went on to say that the song "boasts some of Linde's most inventive lyrics, and Jackson delivers each line with a tongue-in-cheek attitude that is sure to elicit smiles." Nick Marino of Entertainment Weekly gave the song a positive review, contrasting it with "Burnin' the Honky Tonks Down" on the same album. He wrote that both songs were "a hoot and a half."

== Music video ==
The video was directed by Margaret Malandruccolo and released in May 2005. Actors Anthony Clark (as the customer/songwriter) and former Nickelodeon GUTS and Get the Picture host Mike O'Malley (as the mechanic), then cast members of the CBS sitcom Yes, Dear, appear in the video.

The video begins with Clark's car breaking down in front of a garage. He has O'Malley look at it, and he tells Clark the distributor cap is broken, and to come back (as he was lucky that this was the only garage for 50 miles). The song then begins, and the rest of the video goes exactly as the song states, with both actors mouthing the dialogue in the song. Finally, Jackson pulls up in a Ford GT with "Yee Haw" on the license plate, and offers to take Clark to his destination. He tells O'Malley to have the car ready, and he and Jackson drive off, leaving O'Malley confused as he goes back into the garage.

Alan is also seen performing the song near a fence while playing guitar.

== Chart performance ==
"The Talkin' Song Repair Blues" debuted at number 45 on the U.S. Billboard Hot Country Singles & Tracks for the week of April 2, 2005.

Chart (2005)	Peak position
US Hot Country Songs (Billboard)	18
US Billboard Hot 100	99
