= Small Town Southern Man =

Single by Alan Jackson

from the album Good Time
- Released: November 19, 2007
- Genre: Country
- Length: 4:40
- Label: Arista Nashville
- Songwriter: Alan Jackson
- Producer: Keith Stegall

Alan Jackson singles chronology
"A Woman's Love" (2007)	"Small Town Southern Man" (2007)	"Good Time" (2008)

"Small Town Southern Man" is a song written and recorded by American country music artist Alan Jackson. It was released in November 2007 as the lead single from his album Good Time (see 2008 in country music). The song reached the top of the Billboard Hot Country Songs charts in March 2008, becoming Jackson's 23rd number one hit on that chart, and his first since "Remember When" in February 2004.

== Content ==
Described by the magazine Country Weekly as a "loping, fiddle-and-steel-guitar-driven song", "Small Town Southern Man" is set in a moderate tempo and composed of three verses. Its lyrics tell of the life of Jackson's father, and how he was "raised on the ways and gentle kindness of a small town Southern man".

Despite several similarities between his life and the song, Jackson said it wasn't a tribute to his father or a grandfather, although he did draw from his own ancestry as an inspiration. This is especially evident in the line, "First there came four pretty daughters for the Small Town Southern Man, then a few years later came another, a boy; he wasn't planned," (Jackson has 4 sisters, is the youngest and only son). According to him, the song is actually a tribute to anyone with a rural upbringing such as his own: "Wherever you go, there are rural people that are working for a living and raising families. They all have the same qualities and goals as a small town Southern man."

== Critical reception ==
Kevin John Coyne, reviewing the song for Country Universe, gave it an A rating. He calls the song "a deserving tribute to fathers who put family before everything else, and a comfort to the sons and daughters that miss them once they’re gone".

== Chart performance ==
Chart (2007–2008)	Peak position
US Hot Country Songs (Billboard)	1
US Billboard Hot 100	42
US Billboard Pop 100	89
Canada Country (Billboard)	3
Canada Hot 100 (Billboard)	62

=== Year-end charts ===
Chart (2008)	Position
US Country Songs (Billboard)	3
Canada Country (Billboard)	9

== Certifications ==
Certifications for Small Town Southern Man
Region	Certification	Certified units/sales
United States (RIAA)	Platinum	1,000,000^{‡}
^{‡} Sales+streaming figures based on certification alone.
