= Super Hits (Alan Jackson album) =

Greatest hits album by Alan Jackson
- Released: March 23, 1999
- Genre: Country
- Length: 28:39
- Label: Arista
- Producer: Scott Hendricks; Keith Stegall

Alan Jackson chronology
High Mileage (1998)	Super Hits (1999)	Under the Influence (1999)

Super Hits is the second greatest hits compilation album by Alan Jackson. The album was re-released in 2007. It is part of a series of similar Super Hits albums issued by Sony BMG, the parent company of Jackson's label, Arista Nashville.

== Track listing ==
No.	Title	Writer(s)	Length
1.	"Chasin' That Neon Rainbow"	Alan Jackson, Jim McBride	3:05
2.	"(Who Says) You Can't Have It All"	A. Jackson, McBride	3:28
3.	"She's Got the Rhythm (And I Got the Blues)"	A. Jackson, Randy Travis	2:23
4.	"I Don't Even Know Your Name"	A. Jackson, Ron Jackson, Andy Loftin	3:50
5.	"Blue Blooded Woman"	A. Jackson, Roger Murrah, Keith Stegall	2:13
6.	"Working Class Hero"	A. Jackson, Don Sampson	3:14
7.	"That's All I Need to Know"	A. Jackson, McBride	3:46
8.	"You Can't Give Up on Love"	A. Jackson	3:06
9.	"Must've Had a Ball"	A. Jackson	3:34
Total length:			28:39

== Critical reception ==
Professional ratings
Review scores
Source	Rating
Allmusic	2.5/5 stars
The Rolling Stone Album Guide	2/5 stars

Super Hits received two and half stars out of five from Stephen Thomas Erlewine of Allmusic. Erlewine concludes that the album is "entertaining" on its own terms but "simply doesn't deliver the hits it promises."

== Chart performance ==
Super Hits peaked at #44 on the U.S. Billboard Top Country Albums chart the week of May 22, 1999.

=== Weekly charts ===
Chart (1999)	Peak position
U.S. Billboard Top Country Albums	44

=== Year-end charts ===
Chart (2002)	Position
Canadian Country Albums (Nielsen SoundScan)	81
