= Too Much of a Good Thing =

Single by Alan Jackson

from the album What I Do
- Released: June 21, 2004
- Genre: Country
- Length: 3:08
- Label: Arista Nashville
- Songwriter: Alan Jackson
- Producer: Keith Stegall

Alan Jackson singles chronology
"Hey, Good Lookin'" (2004)	"Too Much of a Good Thing" (2004)	"Monday Morning Church" (2004)

"Too Much of a Good Thing" is a song written and recorded by American country music artist Alan Jackson. It was released in June 2004 as the lead-off single from his album What I Do. It peaked at number 5 on the United States Billboard Hot Country Singles & Tracks chart, and number 46 on the Billboard Hot 100 chart.

== Content ==
In the song, the narrator states tells his lover that seeing each other all the time is a good thing. He goes on to tell her that they have a good thing going on.

== Chart performance ==
"Too Much of a Good Thing" debuted at number 49 on the U.S. Billboard Hot Country Singles & Tracks for the week of June 26, 2004.

Chart (2004)	Peak position
US Hot Country Songs (Billboard)	5
US Billboard Hot 100	46

=== Year-end charts ===
Chart (2004)	Position
US Country Songs (Billboard)	33
