= Right on the Money =

"Right On The Money"

Single by Alan Jackson

from the album High Mileage
- B-side: "A Woman's Love"
- Released: October 19, 1998
- Genre: Country
- Length: 3:49
- Label: Arista Nashville 13136
- Songwriters: Charlie Black; Phil Vassar
- Producer: Keith Stegall

Alan Jackson singles chronology
"I'll Go On Loving You" (1998)	"Right On The Money" (1998)	"Gone Crazy" (1999)

"Right on the Money" is a song written by Phil Vassar and Charlie Black, and recorded by American country music singer Alan Jackson. It was released in October 1998 as the second single from his CD High Mileage. The song became Jackson's sixteenth number-one single on the Hot Country Singles & Tracks (now Hot Country Songs) chart.

== Composition ==
The song is in the key of E-flat major. Jackson's vocals range from B♭3 to E♭5. The main chord progression in the verses is E♭-Edim-Fm7-B♭7 three times, followed by A♭ and B♭ for a measure each.

== Chart positions ==
"Right on the Money" debuted at number 75 on the U.S. Billboard Hot Country Singles & Tracks for the week of October 17, 1998.

Chart (1998–1999)	Peak position
Canada Country Singles (RPM)	1
US Billboard Hot 100	43
US Hot Country Songs (Billboard)	1

=== Year-end charts ===
Chart (1999)	Position
Canada Country Tracks (RPM)	49
US Country Songs (Billboard)	47
