= Country Boy (Alan Jackson song) =

Single by Alan Jackson

from the album Good Time
- Released: September 29, 2008
- Genre: Country
- Length: 4:06
- Label: Arista Nashville
- Songwriter: Alan Jackson
- Producer: Keith Stegall

Alan Jackson singles chronology
"Good Time" (2008)	"Country Boy" (2008)	"Sissy's Song" (2009)

"Country Boy" is a song written and recorded by American country music artist Alan Jackson. It is the third single from his album Good Time, having been released in September 2008. In January 2009, "Country Boy" became his twenty-fifth Number One hit on the Billboard country singles charts, as well as the third straight Number One from the album. It was briefly used in the 2010 film Unstoppable.

== Content ==
The song is a moderate up-tempo backed mainly by electric guitar. In it, the male narrator addresses a female, inviting her to climb up into his four-wheel drive truck and telling her that he can take her wherever she wants, because he is a "country boy".

== Critical reception ==
Brady Vercher of Engine 145 gave the song a "thumbs down" rating. His review called the song "four minutes of triviality that declines to say anything more significant than 'I'm a country boy, I've got a 4 wheel drive…'Country Boy' is the kind of rubbish that would be expected from a new artist trying to prove their questionable country credentials rather than a respected veteran of the genre." His review also compared the song's theme to "Country Man", a Top Ten hit for Luke Bryan in mid-2008: "where ['Country Man'] embraces it’s [sic] own absurdity, 'Country Boy' tries to cover it’s [sic] own suggestive innuendo." Jeffrey B. Remz of Country Standard Time described the song more favorably, saying that despite the song's often-used theme of Southern life, "Jackson can lay claim to being the real deal and not a poseur."

== Music video ==
In late September 2008, Jackson announced on his official YouTube channel that he was holding a music video contest for "Country Boy". The viewers, or YouTubers, were asked to create a simple video no longer than five minutes driving around with a girlfriend. The contest ended on October 6, 2008, and was won by Clay Ashley, Dan Hair, and Mark Trotter of Sioux City, Iowa. Before the official video, television network CMT aired a live music video which featured Jackson performing the song with Brad Paisley, Dierks Bentley and George Strait on the CMT Country Giants special.

== Chart performance ==
"Country Boy" peaked at Number One on the Billboard country charts in January 2009, becoming Jackson's twenty-fifth Number One on that chart and matching George Strait's record for the most Number One hits by a country artist since January 1990, when the charts were first tabulated via Nielsen Broadcast Data Systems (counting only singles that were Number Ones during that timespan).

Chart (2008–2009)	Peak position
US Hot Country Songs (Billboard)	1
US Billboard Hot 100	49
Canada Country (Billboard)	1
Canada Hot 100 (Billboard)	61

=== Year-end charts ===
Chart (2009)	Position
US Country Songs (Billboard)	46

== Certifications ==
Certifications for Country Boy
Region	Certification	Certified units/sales
United States (RIAA)	Platinum	1,000,000^{‡}
^{‡} Sales+streaming figures based on certification alone.
