= Little Man (Alan Jackson song) =

Single by Alan Jackson

from the album High Mileage
- B-side: "Hurtin' Comes Easy"
- Released: May 31, 1999
- Genre: Country
- Length: 4:28
- Label: Arista Nashville
- Songwriter: Alan Jackson
- Producer: Keith Stegall

Alan Jackson singles chronology
"Gone Crazy" (2008)	"Little Man" (1999)	"Pop a Top" (1999)

"Little Man" is a song written and recorded by American country music artist Alan Jackson. It was released in May 1999 as the fourth and final single from his album High Mileage. The song topped at number three on the U.S. Billboard Hot Country Singles charts, and four on the Canadian RPM Country Tracks chart. It was also Jackson's first single to reach the Top 40 on the Billboard Hot 100, peaking at #39.

== Content ==
The song is about small businesses that struggled to compete against big businesses, such as corporations, but did not make it, referring to them as "the little man". The narrator tells about his memories as he looks at the storefronts of abandoned businesses that went under. "I go back now and the stores are empty/ Except an old Coke sign dated 1950/ Boarded up like they never existed."

== Music video ==
The music video was shot entirely in black and white. It starts out with Jackson talking about his inspiration for writing the song before going into the actual video of the song. Jackson tells of a trip he took through random small towns where he saw many closed small businesses. Many of the places he visited he had been to as a child, and he realized how much they'd changed. The video was shot in the small towns of Lascassas, Tennessee, Jasper, Florida, White Springs, Florida and Pavo, Georgia. Most of the video shows Alan driving down the main street waving at the townspeople. It was directed by Steven Goldmann.

== Chart positions ==
"Little Man" debuted at number 68 on the Billboard Hot Country Singles & Tracks (now Hot Country Songs) charts dated for the week ending May 29, 1999.

Chart (1999)	Peak position
Canada Country Singles (RPM)	4
US Billboard Hot 100	39
US Hot Country Songs (Billboard)	3

=== Year-end charts ===
Chart (1999)	Position
Canada Country Tracks (RPM)	9
US Country Songs (Billboard)	25
