= The Wrights (duo) =

American country music duo

- Origin: Atlanta, Georgia, United States
- Genre: Country
- Years active: 1998–present
- Label: Alan's Country Records/RCA
- Members: Adam Wright; Shannon Wright

The Wrights are an American country music duo composed of husband and wife Adam Wright and Shannon Wright. Adam Wright is also the nephew of country music artist Alan Jackson.

Adam and Shannon Wright met in 1998 after he filled in for a musician in her band in Atlanta, Georgia. The two started out writing songs together, eventually marrying and moving to Nashville, Tennessee, in 2002. Two of the duo's songs can be found on Jackson's 2004 album What I Do.

A year later, the Wrights' debut album, Down This Road, was released on Jackson's personal label, ACR (Alan's Country Records), in association with RCA Records. Adam and Shannon wrote all of the songs on their album. A self-titled, eight-song EP and a second album, In the Summertime, both followed in 2008.

== Discography ==
=== Albums ===
Title	Album details	Peak positions
Title	Album details	US Country
Down This Road	Release date: May 16, 2005; Label: ACR/RCA Records	71
The Wrights	Release date: January 29, 2008; Label: Mailboat Records	—
In the Summertime	Release date: June 17, 2008; Label: TOUR	—
Red and Yellow, Blue and Green	Release date: August 10, 2010; Label: TOUR	—
"—" denotes releases that did not chart

=== Singles ===
Year	Single	Album
2005	"Down This Road"	Down This Road
2005	"On the Rocks"	Down This Road

=== Music videos ===
Year	Video	Director
2005	"Down This Road"	Steven Goldmann
