= Precious Memories (Alan Jackson album) =

Studio album by Alan Jackson
- Released: February 28, 2006
- Genres: Christian country, gospel
- Length: 37:00
- Label: Arista Nashville
- Producer: Keith Stegall

Alan Jackson chronology
What I Do (2004)	Precious Memories (2006)	Like Red on a Rose (2006)

Professional ratings
Aggregate scores
Source	Rating
Metacritic	(71/100)
Review scores
Source	Rating
About.com	5/5 stars
AllMusic	3/5 stars
Billboard	(favorable)
E! Online	C
Entertainment Weekly	B+
No Depression	(favorable)
Rolling Stone	2.5/5 stars
Stylus Magazine	B+

Precious Memories is the thirteenth studio album and the first gospel album by American country music artist Alan Jackson. It was released on February 28, 2006 on the Arista Nashville label. This project began at The Rukkus Room Recording Studios when Alan Jackson recorded a song for his father-in-law’s funeral. This recording led to what is now the Precious Memories album. Unlike his previous albums, this is a side project composed of traditional gospel songs. Although no singles were released from it, Precious Memories earned a Platinum certification by the Recording Industry Association of America (RIAA).

A second volume, Precious Memories Volume II, was released on March 26, 2013.

== Track listing ==
1. "Blessed Assurance" – 1:56 (Phoebe P. Knapp, Fanny J. Crosby)
2. "Softly and Tenderly" – 3:17 (Will L. Thompson)
3. "I Love to Tell the Story" – 2:53 (William G. Fischer, Katherine Hankey)
4. "When We All Get to Heaven" (Eliza E. Hewitt) – 1:44
5. "'Tis So Sweet to Trust in Jesus" (Louisa M. R. Stead) – 1:52
6. "In the Garden" (Charles Austin Miles) – 2:54
7. "Are You Washed in the Blood?" (Elisha Hoffman)– 1:15
8. "I'll Fly Away" (Albert E. Brumley) – 2:13
9. "What a Friend We Have in Jesus" (Charles Converse, Joseph Scriven) – 2:16
10. "Standing on the Promises" (Russell Kelso Carter) – 1:35
11. "Turn Your Eyes upon Jesus" (Helen H. Lemmel) – 3:47
12. "Leaning on the Everlasting Arms" (Anthony J. Showalter, Elisha A. Hoffman)– 1:34
13. "The Old Rugged Cross" (George Bennard) – 3:06
14. "How Great Thou Art" (Stuart Hine) – 3:32
15. "I Want to Stroll over Heaven with You" (Dale Dodson) – 3:06

== Personnel ==
As listed in liner notes.

- Alan Jackson – vocals, acoustic guitar
- Melodie Crittenden – backing vocals
- Ali Jackson – backing vocals on "'Tis So Sweet to Trust in Jesus"
- Dani Jackson – assistant backing vocals on "'Tis So Sweet to Trust in Jesus"
- Denise Jackson – backing vocals on "'Tis So Sweet to Trust in Jesus"
- Mattie Jackson – backing vocals on "'Tis So Sweet to Trust in Jesus"
- Brent Mason – acoustic guitar
- Gary Prim – piano, organ
- John Wesley Ryles – backing vocals
- Keith Stegall – piano on "Turn Your Eyes Upon Jesus"

== Chart performance ==
Precious Memories debuted at No. 4 on the U.S. Billboard 200, and No. 1 on the Top Country Albums, becoming his eighth #1 country album. In August 2006, Precious Memories was certified Platinum by the RIAA. It has sold 389,600 copies in the United States as of November 2017.

== Charts ==
=== Weekly charts ===
Chart (2006)	Peak position
US Billboard 200	4
US Top Christian Albums (Billboard)	1
US Top Country Albums (Billboard)	1

=== Year-end charts ===
Chart (2006)	Position
US Billboard 200	45
US Christian Albums (Billboard)	1
US Top Country Albums (Billboard)	13

Chart (2007)	Position
US Billboard 200	123
US Christian Albums (Billboard)	2
US Top Country Albums (Billboard)	22

== Sales and certifications ==
Region	Provider	Certification	Sales
United States	RIAA	Platinum	389,600

== Awards ==
In 2007, the album won a Dove Award for Country Album of the Year at the 38th GMA Dove Awards.
