= Who I Am (Alan Jackson album) =

Studio album by Alan Jackson
- Released: June 28, 1994
- Recorded: January 1994
- Studio: Cayman Moon Recorders, Berry Hill, TN, The Castle, Franklin TN, Eleven Eleven Sound, and Showbus Studio, Nashville, TN
- Genre: Neotraditional country
- Length: 46:50
- Label: Arista
- Producer: Keith Stegall

Alan Jackson chronology
Honky Tonk Christmas (1993)	Who I Am (1994)	The Greatest Hits Collection (1995)

Singles from Who I Am
- 1. "Summertime Blues" Released: June 6, 1994; 2. "Livin' on Love" Released: August 29, 1994; 3. "Gone Country" Released: November 15, 1994; 4. "Song for the Life" Released: February 6, 1995; 5. "I Don't Even Know Your Name" Released: May 15, 1995

Professional ratings
Review scores
Source	Rating
AllMusic	4/5 stars
Entertainment Weekly	B
Los Angeles Times	(June 26, 1994) (November 27, 1994)
(The New) Rolling Stone Album Guide	2/5 stars

Who I Am is the fifth studio album by American country music artist Alan Jackson. The album was released on June 28, 1994, via Arista Records. It features the Number One singles "Summertime Blues", "Gone Country", "Livin' on Love", and "I Don't Even Know Your Name", and the #6-peaking "Song for the Life".

Several of this album's tracks had been recorded by other artists, including two of the singles: "Summertime Blues" is a cover of the pop standard made famous by Eddie Cochran, while "Song for the Life" was recorded by several artists, including writer Rodney Crowell, whose version can be found on his 1977 debut Ain't Living Long Like This. In addition, "Thank God for the Radio" was a Number One hit in 1984 for The Kendalls from their album Movin' Train. Jackson re-recorded "Let's Get Back to Me and You" for his 2013 release, The Bluegrass Album.

The international version of the album included an extended remix of Jackson's 1993 Number One hit "Chattahoochee" as a bonus track.

== Track listing ==
No.	Title	Writer(s)	Length
1.	"Summertime Blues"	Jerry Capehart, Eddie Cochran	3:11
2.	"Livin' on Love"	Alan Jackson	3:49
3.	"Hole in the Wall"	A. Jackson, Jim McBride	3:33
4.	"Gone Country"	Bob McDill	4:20
5.	"Who I Am"	Harley Allen, Mel Besher	2:46
6.	"You Can't Give Up on Love"	A. Jackson	3:06
7.	"I Don't Even Know Your Name"	A. Jackson, Ron Jackson, Andy Loftin	3:49
8.	"Song for the Life"	Rodney Crowell	4:32
9.	"Thank God for the Radio"	Max D. Barnes, Robert John Jones	3:19
10.	"All American Country Boy"	Charlie Craig, Keith Stegall	3:18
11.	"Job Description"	A. Jackson	4:41
12.	"If I Had You"	A. Jackson, McBride	3:33
13.	"Let's Get Back to Me and You"	A. Jackson	2:52

=== International bonus track ===
No.	Title	Writer(s)	Length
14.	"Chattahoochee (Extended Remix)"	A. Jackson, McBride	4:06

Note

- On the back of the album, "Let's Get Back to Me and You" is listed as track #14, with no #13 on the packaging. A short message on the back reads: "That's right folks, I am just a tad superstitious - AJ."

== Personnel ==
Compiled from the album's liner notes.

Musicians

- Alan Jackson – lead vocals, backing vocals on "Summertime Blues"
- Eddie Bayers – drums
- Stuart Duncan – fiddle
- Robbie Flint – acoustic slide guitar
- Larry Franklin – fiddle
- Paul Franklin – steel guitar
- John Hughey – steel guitar
- Roy Huskey Jr. – acoustic bass
- John Kelton – tic tac bass
- Brent Mason – electric guitar, six-string electric bass, acoustic guitar solo on "I Don't Even Know Your Name"
- Hargus "Pig" Robbins – piano
- John Wesley Ryles – backing vocals
- Keith Stegall – acoustic guitar, piano
- Bruce Watkins – acoustic guitar
- Glenn Worf – bass guitar

Technical

- John Kelton – recording, mixing
- Steve Lowery – additional recording
- Keith Stegall – production
- Hank Williams – mastering

== Chart performance ==
Who I Am peaked at #5 on the U.S. Billboard 200 and #1 on the Top Country Albums selling 102,000 copies, becoming Alan Jackson's second #1 country album. In January 1999, Who I Am was certified 4× Platinum by the Recording Industry Association of America.

== Charts ==
=== Weekly charts ===
Chart (1994)	Peak position
Canadian Albums (RPM)	8
Canadian Country Albums (RPM)	1
US Billboard 200	5
US Top Country Albums (Billboard)	1

=== Year-end charts ===
Chart (1994)	Position
US Billboard 200	70
US Top Country Albums (Billboard)	8
Chart (1995)	Position
US Billboard 200	72
US Top Country Albums (Billboard)	8

== Certifications ==
Certifications for Who I Am
Region	Certification	Certified units/sales
Australia (ARIA)	Gold	35,000^{^}
Canada (Music Canada)	3× Platinum	300,000^{^}
United States (RIAA)	4× Platinum	4,000,000^{^}
^{^} Shipments figures based on certification alone.
