= A Woman's Love =

Single by Alan Jackson

from the album Like Red on a Rose
- Released: January 8, 2007
- Recorded: 2006
- Genre: Country, soft rock, adult contemporary
- Length: 4:13 (2006 version); 3:53 (1998 version); 4:03 (2006 radio version)
- Label: Arista Nashville
- Songwriter: Alan Jackson
- Producer: Alison Krauss

Alan Jackson singles chronology
"Like Red on a Rose" (2006)	"A Woman's Love" (2007)	"Small Town Southern Man" (2007)

"A Woman's Love" is a song written and recorded by American country music artist Alan Jackson. Jackson originally recorded the song on his 1998 album High Mileage. This version was the b-side to the album's single "Right on the Money".

In 2006, Jackson re-recorded the song for his album Like Red on a Rose. This version was released in January 2007 as the album's second and final single.

== Content ==
The song explores a man's thoughts on being loved.

The 2007 re-recording features twin electric guitar played by Ron Block.

== Critical reception ==
Deborah Evans Price, of Billboard magazine reviewed the song favorably, calling the song "a warm, romantic tune that showcases Jackson's softer side." She goes on to call the song "beautifully performed and written." Kevin John Coyne, reviewing the song for Country Universe, gave it a B+ rating. He said the song is "deep and meaningful, with even Jackson sounding far more committed to his own song now than he did eight years ago."

== Chart performance ==
"A Woman's Love" debuted at number 57 on the U.S. Billboard Hot Country Songs for the week of January 6, 2007.

Chart (2007)	Peak position
US Hot Country Songs (Billboard)	5
US Billboard Hot 100	73
Canada Country (Billboard)	11

=== Year-end charts ===
Chart (2007)	Position
US Country Songs (Billboard)	19
