= Are You Washed in the Blood? =

1878 Christian hymn

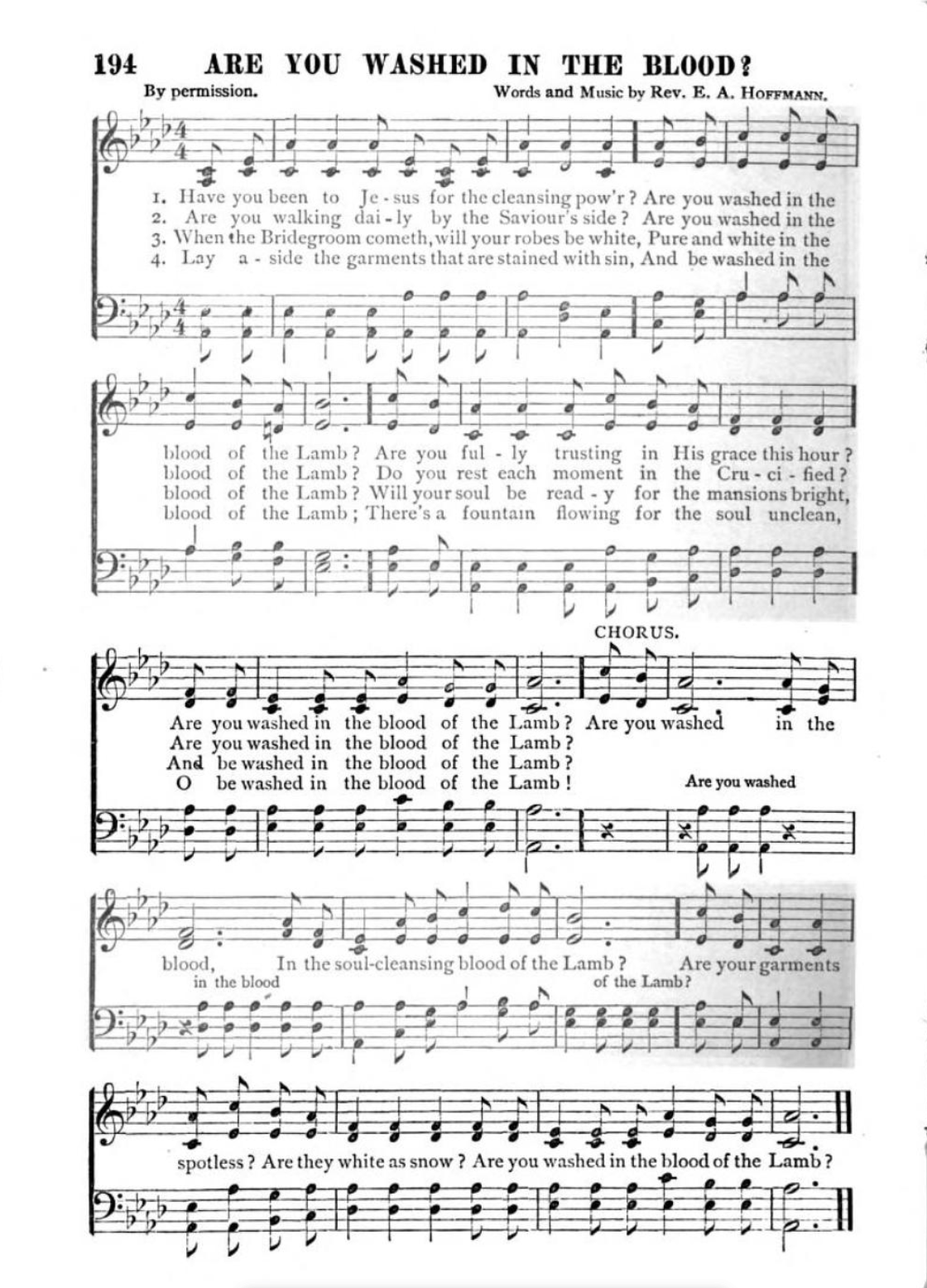
"Are You Washed in the Blood?" music from Gospel Praise Book: A Collection of Choice Gems of Sacred Song (1880)

Are You Washed in the Blood? is a Christian hymn written in 1878 in Ohio by Elisha Hoffman, a Presbyterian minister from Pennsylvania; it was first published in Spiritual Songs for Gospel Meetings and the Sunday School. The song "became a marching song for the Salvation Army." It contains many Bible references and allusions, including to Revelation 7:14: "They have washed their robes and made them white in the blood of the Lamb".

The song has been recorded by many artists, including Johnny Cash, Alan Jackson, Randy Travis, the Louvin Brothers, and Ernest Stoneman's Dixie Mountaineers in the Bristol sessions (1927). It is heard in the Paul Schrader film First Reformed and in the opening tutorial sequence of the multi-platform video game Wasteland 3 under the name "Blood of the Lamb".
