= Honky Tonk Christmas =

Studio album (Christmas) by Alan Jackson
- Released: October 12, 1993
- Genres: Christmas; country
- Length: 31:43
- Label: Arista
- Producer: Keith Stegall

Alan Jackson chronology
A Lot About Livin' (And a Little 'bout Love) (1992)	Honky Tonk Christmas (1993)	Who I Am (1994)

Honky Tonk Christmas is the fourth studio album and the first Christmas album by country music artist Alan Jackson. It was released on October 12, 1993, by Arista Records. The title track, "A Holly Jolly Christmas" and "I Only Want You for Christmas" charted on the Hot Country Songs charts.

"Please, Daddy (Don't Get Drunk This Christmas)" was originally recorded by John Denver for his 1973 album Farewell Andromeda. Jackson's version of "A Holly Jolly Christmas" first appeared on the soundtrack to the 1992 film Home Alone 2: Lost in New York, while "Santa's Gonna Come in a Pickup Truck" was also included on the 1994 Alvin and the Chipmunks album A Very Merry Chipmunk.

"Honky Tonk Christmas" was released on vinyl for the first time in October 2023 for the album's 30th anniversary.

Professional ratings
Review scores
Source	Rating
AllMusic	4.5/5 stars
Entertainment Weekly	B+
Los Angeles Times	3/4 stars
The Rolling Stone Album Guide	2/5 stars

== Track listing ==
CD
No.	Title	Writer(s)	Duet partner (s)	Length
1.	"Honky Tonk Christmas"	Buddy Brock; Zack Turner; Kim Williams		2:53
2.	"The Angels Cried"	Harley Allen; Debbie Nims	Alison Krauss	2:51
3.	"If We Make It Through December"	Merle Haggard		2:45
4.	"If You Don't Wanna See Santa Claus Cry"	Keith Stegall		3:14
5.	"I Only Want You for Christmas"	Turner; Tim Nichols		3:20
6.	"Merry Christmas to Me"	Alan Jackson		2:53
7.	"A Holly Jolly Christmas"	Johnny Marks		2:16
8.	"There's a New Kid in Town"	Don Cook; Curly Putman; Keith Whitley	Keith Whitley	4:09
9.	"Santa's Gonna Come in a Pickup Truck"	Don Rich; Red Simpson	Alvin and the Chipmunks	4:08
10.	"Please Daddy (Don't Get Drunk This Christmas)"	Bill Danoff; Taffy Nivert		3:20
Total length:				31:49

== Personnel ==
- Alan Jackson – lead vocals, backing vocals
- Vanessa Adiar – choir
- Harley Allen – mandolin
- Cindy Ashcraft – choir
- Ross Bagdasarian Jr. – speaking part
- Eddie Bayers – drums
- Ashley Berry – choir
- Mark Casstevens – banjo
- Angela Chancellor – choir
- Alvin and the Chipmunks – vocals on "Santa's Gonna Come in a Pickup Truck"
- Jennifer Cockrell – choir
- Eric Darken – percussion
- Stuart Duncan – fiddle, mandolin
- Joe Fisher – choir
- Rhonda Forlaw – choir
- Paul Franklin – pedal steel guitar
- Kelly Giedt – choir
- Dottie Hahn – choir
- Frank Hamlin – choir
- Chris Harris – backing vocals
- Mike Haynes – backing vocals
- Steve Hood – choir
- Jim Horn – saxophone
- Roy Huskey Jr. – bass
- Dick Kaiser – choir
- Janice Karmen – speaking part
- Wayne Kirkpatrick – backing vocals
- Alison Krauss – vocals on "The Angels Cried"
- Jimmy Kull – choir
- Brent Mason – electric guitar
- Richard Morris – choir
- Weldon Myrick – pedal steel guitar
- Kerri Pauley – choir
- Jon Robbin – choir
- Hargus "Pig" Robbins – piano, backing vocals
- Kara Ross – choir
- Bruce Rutherford – backing vocals
- John Wesley Ryles – backing vocals
- Roxane Stueve – choir
- Kris Sultemeir – choir
- Tom Thornton – choir
- Jim Vest – pedal steel guitar
- Bruce Watkins – acoustic guitar
- Biff Watson – acoustic guitar
- Keith Whitley – vocals on "There's a New Kid in Town"
- Glenn Worf – bass

== Charts ==
Honky Tonk Christmas peaked at No. 42 on the U.S. Billboard 200, and No. 7 on the Top Country Albums. In January 1998, Honky Tonk Christmas was certified Platinum by the RIAA. It has sold 1,324,800 copies in the U.S. as of November 2017. It was later certified double platinum in 2026.

=== Charts ===
Chart (1993)	Peak position
U.S. Billboard 200	43
U.S. Billboard Top Country Albums	7
U.S. Billboard Top Holiday Albums	4

== Certifications ==
Certifications for Honky Tonk Christmas
Region	Certification	Certified units/sales
United States (RIAA)	2× Platinum	2,000,000^{‡}
^{‡} Sales+streaming figures based on certification alone.
