= Live at Texas Stadium =

Live album by Alan Jackson, George Strait and Jimmy Buffett
- Released: April 3, 2007
- Recorded: May 29, 2004
- Venue: Texas Stadium
- Genre: Country
- Length: 59:38
- Label: Mailboat
- Producer: Mac McAnally, Keith Stegall, George Strait, Michael Utley

Alan Jackson chronology
Like Red on a Rose (2006)	Live at Texas Stadium (2007)	16 Biggest Hits (2007)

George Strait chronology
Fresh Cut Christmas (2006)	Live at Texas Stadium (2007)	22 More Hits (2007)

Jimmy Buffett chronology
Take the Weather with You (2006)	Live at Texas Stadium (2007)	Live in Anguilla (2007)

Professional ratings
Review scores
Source	Rating
Allmusic	3/5 stars

Live at Texas Stadium is a live album by Alan Jackson, George Strait and Jimmy Buffett. It was recorded during a concert at Texas Stadium that took place on May 29, 2004. The album was released by Mailboat Records on April 3, 2007.

== Track listing ==
No.	Title	Writer(s)	Performer(s)	Length
1.	"Honk If You Honky Tonk"	Dean Dillon, Ken Mellons, John Northrup	George Strait	2:49
2.	"Murder on Music Row"	Larry Cordle, Larry Shell	Alan Jackson, Strait	4:23
3.	"Milk Cow Blues"	Kokomo Arnold	Strait	5:20
4.	"Cowboys Like Us"	Bob DiPiero, Anthony Smith	Strait	4:02
5.	"All My Ex's Live in Texas"	Sanger D. Shafer, Lyndia Shafer	Strait, Jimmy Buffett	3:26
6.	"Hey Good Lookin'"	Hank Williams	Jackson, Strait, Buffett	4:11
7.	"Sea of Heartbreak"	Hal David, Paul Hampton	Strait, Buffett	4:18
8.	"North East Texas Woman"	Willis Alan Ramsey	Buffett	3:57
9.	"Boats to Build"	Guy Clark, Verlon Thompson	Jackson, Buffett	3:03
10.	"Margaritaville"	Jimmy Buffett	Jackson, Strait, Buffett	4:37
11.	"It's Five O'Clock Somewhere"	Jim Brown, Don Rollins	Jackson, Buffett	3:56
12.	"Designated Drinker"	Alan Jackson	Jackson, Strait	4:24
13.	"Texas Women"	Hank Williams Jr.	Jackson	2:51
14.	"Seven Bridges Road"	Steve Young	Jackson	2:53
15.	"Where I Come From"	Alan Jackson	Jackson	5:21
Total length:				59:38

== Personnel ==
- Monty Allen – background vocals
- Anthony Bazzani – keyboards
- Jimmy Buffett – lead vocals, acoustic guitar, electric guitar
- Mike Daily – steel guitar
- Gene Elders – fiddle
- Robbie Flint – steel guitar
- Dave Gaylord – fiddle, mandolin, background vocals
- Doyle Grisham – steel guitar
- Danny Groah – electric guitar
- Tina Gullickson – acoustic guitar, background vocals
- Roger Guth – drums
- Terry Hale – bass guitar
- Wes Hightower – background vocals
- Ronnie Huckaby – piano
- Alan Jackson – acoustic guitar, lead vocals
- Dan Kelley – fiddle, mandolin
- Mike Kennedy – drums
- John Lovell – trumpet
- Ralph MacDonald – percussion
- Mac McAnally – acoustic guitar, background vocals
- Rick McRae – electric guitar
- Jim Mayer – bass guitar, background vocals
- Monty Perkey – keyboards
- Bill Payne – piano
- Bruce Rutherford – drums
- Tom Rutledge – acoustic guitar, resonator guitar
- Nadirah Shakoor – background vocals
- Marty Slayton – background vocals
- Tony Stephens – harmonica
- George Strait – lead vocals, acoustic guitar
- Jeff Sturms – acoustic guitar
- Michael Utley – keyboards, background vocals
- Roger Wills – bass guitar

== Charts ==
Live at Texas Stadium debuted at number 11 on the U.S. Billboard 200 and number 4 on the Top Country Albums.

=== Weekly charts ===
Chart (2007)	Peak position
US Billboard 200	11
US Top Country Albums (Billboard)	4

=== Year-end charts ===
Chart (2007)	Position
US Top Country Albums (Billboard)	53
