= Precious Memories Volume II =

Studio album by Alan Jackson
- Released: March 26, 2013
- Genre: Christian country, gospel
- Length: 35:47
- Label: Alan's Country Records; EMI Nashville
- Producer: Keith Stegall

Alan Jackson chronology
Playlist: The Very Best of Alan Jackson (2012)	Precious Memories Volume II (2013)	The Bluegrass Album (2013)

Professional ratings
Review scores
Source	Rating
Allmusic	3/5 stars

Precious Memories Volume II is the eighteenth studio album and the second gospel album by American country music artist Alan Jackson. It was released on March 26, 2013, via Alan's Country Records and EMI Nashville. The album is a follow-up to Jackson's 2006 album Precious Memories. Of the album, Jackson said, "Denise and I had made a list of 30 to 40 songs to do for that first album. We had so many that we didn't get to, I thought we'd go in and do a few more just the same way - heartfelt and simple."

== Reception ==
Precious Memories Volume ll debuted at No. 1 on Top Christian Albums, and No. 2 on Top Country Albums on chart date of April 13, 2013. It sold 56,000 copies in the first week, only 7,000 of these were digital albums. The album has sold 453,200 copies in the United States as of October 2019.

The album won Top Christian Album at the 2014 Billboard Music Awards.

== Track listing ==
No.	Title	Writer(s)	Length
1.	"Amazing Grace"	John Newton	4:04
2.	"He Lives"	Alfred Henry Ackley	3:02
3.	"Just as I Am"	Charlotte Elliott; William Batchelder Bradbury	4:16
4.	"Love Lifted Me"	James Rowe	2:39
5.	"O How I Love Jesus"	Frederick Whitfield	2:24
6.	"Only Trust Him"	John H. Stockton	2:40
7.	"There is Power in the Blood"	Lewis Edgar Jones	2:38
8.	"Precious Memories"	John B. F. Wright	4:21
9.	"Sweet Hour of Prayer"	William W. Walford	3:16
10.	"When the Roll Is Called Up Yonder"	James Milton Black	2:21
11.	"Wherever He Leads I'll Go"	Baylus Benjamin McKinney	4:06
Total length:			35:47

== Personnel ==
- Joe Combs - background vocals
- Ed Enoch - background vocals
- Tania Hancheroff - background vocals
- Travis Humbert - percussion
- Alan Jackson - lead vocals
- John Kelton - autoharp
- Steve Ladd - background vocals
- Brent Mason - acoustic guitar
- Michael Means - background vocals
- Gary Prim - keyboards
- John Wesley Ryles - background vocals
- Keith Stegall - acoustic guitar
- Glenn Worf - bass guitar

== Charts ==
=== Weekly charts ===
Chart (2013)	Peak position
US Billboard 200	5
US Christian Albums (Billboard)	1
US Top Country Albums (Billboard)	2

=== Year-end charts ===
Chart (2013)	Position
US Billboard 200	128
US Christian Albums (Billboard)	3
US Top Country Albums (Billboard)	28
Chart (2014)	Position
US Christian Albums (Billboard)	35
