= Good Time (Alan Jackson album) =

Studio album by Alan Jackson
- Released: March 4, 2008
- Genre: Country
- Length: 71:11
- Label: Arista Nashville
- Producer: Keith Stegall

Alan Jackson chronology
16 Biggest Hits (2007)	Good Time (2008)	Songs of Love and Heartache (2009)

Singles from Good Time
- 1. "Small Town Southern Man" Released: November 19, 2007; 2. "Good Time" Released: April 21, 2008; 3. "Country Boy" Released: September 29, 2008; 4. "Sissy's Song" Released: March 2, 2009; 5. "I Still Like Bologna" Released: August 3, 2009

Professional ratings
Aggregate scores
Source	Rating
Metacritic	(68/100)
Review scores
Source	Rating
Allmusic	4/5 stars
The A.V. Club	B
Entertainment Weekly	B+
Los Angeles Times	3.5/4 stars
The Phoenix	2.5/4 stars
PopMatters	7/10 stars
Robert Christgau	(choice cut)
Rolling Stone	3/5 stars
Slant	2.5/5 stars
Engine 145	3.5/5 stars
Uncut	2/5 stars

Good Time is the fifteenth studio album by American country music artist Alan Jackson. It was released on March 4, 2008, and produced five singles on the country singles charts. The first three of these — "Small Town Southern Man", the title track, and "Country Boy" — have all become Number One hits. This album marked Alan Jackson's return to the traditional country music roots.

Good Time debuted at number one on the U.S. Billboard 200 chart, selling about 119,000 copies in its first week, and was certified Platinum on February 16, 2010.

== Production ==
After working with Alison Krauss for his previous studio album, Like Red on a Rose, Jackson returned to Keith Stegall (who had produced or co-produced all of Jackson's previous albums) as his producer for this album. Good Time is also the first album of his career on which Jackson wrote all of the material by himself.

== Singles ==
"Small Town Southern Man", the first single, was released in late 2007, and in March 2008, the song reached the top of the Billboard Hot Country Songs charts, becoming Jackson's first Number One hit since "Remember When" in 2004. The album itself was released in March 2008. Following "Small Town Southern Man" were the album's title track and "Country Boy", both of which became Number One hits as well. "Sissy's Song", a song which Jackson originally recorded for the funeral of his housekeeper, was released in March 2009 as the fourth single, and "I Still Like Bologna" was released in August as the fifth.

== Track listing ==
All tracks are written by Alan Jackson.

No.	Title	Length
1.	"Good Time"	5:06
2.	"Small Town Southern Man"	4:40
3.	"I Wish I Could Back Up"	5:05
4.	"Country Boy"	4:06
5.	"Right Where I Want You"	3:51
6.	"1976"	4:09
7.	"When the Love Factor's High"	4:18
8.	"Long Long Way"	4:08
9.	"Sissy's Song"	3:02
10.	"I Still Like Bologna"	4:39
11.	"Never Loved Before" (duet with Martina McBride)	3:32
12.	"Nothing Left to Do"	4:44
13.	"Listen to Your Senses"	3:09
14.	"This Time"	4:34
15.	"Laid Back 'n Low Key (Cay)"	2:51
16.	"If You Want to Make Me Happy"	4:20
17.	"If Jesus Walked the World Today"	4:57

== Chart performance ==
Good Time debuted at #1 on the U.S. Billboard 200, becoming his fourth #1 album, and #1 on the Top Country Albums, becoming his tenth #1 country album. In February 2010, Good Time was certified Platinum by the RIAA.

=== Weekly charts ===
Chart (2008)	Peak position
Australian Albums (ARIA)	21
Canadian Albums (Billboard)	3
Norwegian Albums (VG-lista)	2
Swiss Albums (Schweizer Hitparade)	66
US Billboard 200	1
US Top Country Albums (Billboard)	1

=== Year-end charts ===
Chart (2008)	Position
US Billboard 200	67
US Top Country Albums (Billboard)	14
Chart (2009)	Position
US Billboard 200	95
US Top Country Albums (Billboard)	21

== Certifications ==
Certifications for Good Time
Region	Certification	Certified units/sales
Australia (ARIA)	Gold	35,000^{^}
Canada (Music Canada)	Gold	50,000^{^}
United States (RIAA)	Platinum	1,000,000^{^}
^{^} Shipments figures based on certification alone.

== Personnel ==
- Robert Bailey – background vocals
- Eddie Bayers – drums
- Angela Bennett – background vocals
- Jamaal Carter – background vocals
- Jimmy Carter – bass guitar
- Janice Corder – background vocals
- Melodie Crittenden – background vocals
- Stuart Duncan – fiddle, mandolin
- Robbie Flint – lap steel guitar
- Paul Franklin – Dobro, pedal steel guitar, lap steel guitar
- Vicki Hampton – background vocals
- Emily Harris – background vocals
- Greenwood Hart – vocoder
- Jim Hokeywokey – harmonica, bass harmonica, accordion, Jew's harp
- Alan Jackson – lead vocals
- Edward Jenkins – background vocals
- Shane Keister – vocoder
- Lucas Ketner – percussion
- Martina McBride – duet vocals on "Never Loved Before"
- Brent Mason – electric guitar, acoustic guitar, six-string bass guitar
- James Mitchell – accordion, electric guitar
- Shandra Penix – background vocals
- Gary Prim – piano, keyboards, Hammond B-3 organ, clavinet, Wurlitzer
- Hargus "Pig" Robbins – piano, Hammond B-3 organ, Wurlitzer
- John Wesley Ryles – background vocals
- Bruce Watkins – acoustic guitar, banjo
- Glenn Worf – bass guitar, upright bass
