= Thirty Miles West =

Studio album by Alan Jackson
- Released: June 5, 2012
- Recorded: 2011–2012
- Genre: Country
- Length: 52:21
- Labels: Alan's Country Records; EMI Nashville
- Producer: Keith Stegall

Alan Jackson chronology
34 Number Ones (2010)	Thirty Miles West (2012)	Playlist: The Very Best of Alan Jackson (2012)

Singles from Thirty Miles West
- 1. "Long Way to Go" Released: June 27, 2011; 2. "So You Don't Have to Love Me Anymore" Released: January 16, 2012; 3. "You Go Your Way" Released: August 27, 2012

Thirty Miles West is the seventeenth studio album by American country music artist Alan Jackson. It was released on June 5, 2012, and is Jackson's first album on his own Alan's Country Records in a joint venture with EMI Nashville. The album includes the singles "Long Way to Go," "So You Don't Have to Love Me Anymore" and "You Go Your Way."

The album's title refers to a song about a stretch of the Dixie Highway near Jackson's hometown of Newnan, Georgia. The song, "Dixie Highway," is a duet with Zac Brown.

== Critical reception ==
Professional ratings
Review scores
Source	Rating
About.com	3.5/5 stars
Allmusic	4/5 stars
Country Weekly	(positive)
Los Angeles Times	3/4 stars
The New York Times	(average)
The Washington Post	(average)

Upon its release, Thirty Miles West received generally positive reviews from most music critics. At Metacritic, which assigns a normalized rating out of 100 to reviews from mainstream critics, the album received an average score of 75, based on 4 reviews, which indicates "generally favorable reviews".

== Track listing ==
No.	Title	Writer(s)	Length
1.	"Gonna Come Back as a Country Song"	Terry McBride, Chris Stapleton	3:02
2.	"You Go Your Way"	Troy Jones, David Lee, Tony Lane	3:18
3.	"Everything but the Wings"	Alan Jackson	4:44
4.	"Talk Is Cheap"	Guy Clark, Stapleton, Morgane Hayes	3:48
5.	"So You Don't Have to Love Me Anymore"	Jay Knowles, Adam Wright	3:42
6.	"Look Her in the Eye and Lie"	Jackson	3:48
7.	"Dixie Highway" (with Zac Brown)	Jackson	7:24
8.	"She Don't Get High"	Clint Daniels, Jeff Hyde, Kylie Sackley	4:12
9.	"Her Life's a Song"	Jackson	4:25
10.	"Nothin' Fancy"	Knowles, Wright	3:12
11.	"Long Way to Go"	Jackson	3:39
12.	"Life Keeps Bringin' Me Down"	Al Anderson, Shawn Camp	3:04
13.	"When I Saw You Leaving (For Nisey)"	Jackson	4:04
Total length:			52:21

== Personnel ==
- Zac Brown - duet vocals on "Dixie Highway"
- J.T. Corenflos - electric guitar
- Dan Dugmore - steel guitar, slide guitar
- Larry Franklin - fiddle, mandolin
- Greenwood Hart - percussion
- Alan Jackson - lead vocals
- John Barlow Jarvis - piano, Wurlitzer
- Andy Leftwich - fiddle
- Brent Mason - electric guitar, gut string guitar
- Greg Morrow - drums
- Gordon Mote - Hammond B-3 organ, piano, Wurlitzer
- Steve Patrick - trumpet
- John Wesley Ryles - background vocals
- Marty Slayton - background vocals
- Bobby Terry - acoustic guitar, gut string guitar
- Scott Vestal - banjo
- Glenn Worf - bass guitar

== Charts ==
=== Weekly charts ===
Chart (2012)	Peak position
Australian Albums (ARIA)	6
Canadian Albums (Billboard)	4
Norwegian Albums (VG-lista)	14
Swedish Albums (Sverigetopplistan)	45
UK Country Albums (Official Charts)	3
US Billboard 200	2
US Top Country Albums (Billboard)	1

=== Year-end charts ===
Chart (2012)	Position
US Billboard 200	124
US Top Country Albums (Billboard)	26
