= You Go Your Way (Alan Jackson song) =

Single by Alan Jackson

from the album Thirty Miles West
- Released: August 27, 2012
- Genre: Country
- Length: 3:17
- Label: Alan's Country Records/ EMI Records Nashville
- Songwriters: David Lee; Tony Lane; Troy Jones
- Producer: Keith Stegall

Alan Jackson singles chronology
"So You Don't Have to Love Me Anymore" (2012)	"You Go Your Way" (2012)	"Jim and Jack and Hank" (2015)

"You Go Your Way" is a song recorded by American country music artist Alan Jackson. It was released in August 2012 as the third single from Jackson's seventeenth studio album Thirty Miles West. The song was written by David Lee, Tony Lane, and Troy Jones.

== Critical reception ==
Ben Foster of Country Universe gave the song an A grade. He writes that, "In structure and theme, "You Go Your Way" bears a moderate resemblance to George Strait’s classic 1993 hit "Easy Come, Easy Go", but with a deeper shade of heartache." He goes on to say, "The lyric is framed in a quietly infectious melody as well as a fiddle and steel-drenched Keith Stegall arrangement that sounds absolutely fantastic. Though we would generally expect nothing less from Alan Jackson, such work seems almost revolutionary in comparison to the warmed-over sounds that have all but taken over country radio."

Taste of Country editor Billy Dukes rated the song 2.5 stars out of 5. Dukes states, "Unlike 'So You Don't Have to Love Me Anymore', the legend doesn't appear to dive deep into a memory to recreate a sense of loss. The song is sung with all the worry of Brad Paisley's 'I’m Gonna Miss Her'."

== Chart performance ==
"You Go Your Way" reached 41 on the Billboard Hot Country Songs chart as well as 39 on the Billboard Country Airplay chart. To date, this is Jackson's final Top 40 hit.

Chart (2012)	Peak position
US Country Airplay (Billboard)	39
US Hot Country Songs (Billboard)	41
