= USA Today (song) =

Single by Alan Jackson

from the album What I Do
- Released: August 22, 2005
- Recorded: 2004
- Genre: Country
- Length: 3:26
- Label: Arista Nashville
- Songwriter: Alan Jackson
- Producer: Keith Stegall

Alan Jackson singles chronology
"The Talkin' Song Repair Blues" (2005)	"USA Today" (2005)	"Like Red on a Rose" (2006)

"USA Today" is a song written and recorded by American country music artist Alan Jackson. It was released in August 2005 as the fourth single from his album What I Do. It peaked at number 18 on the United States Billboard Hot Country Songs chart, and number 7 on the Bubbling Under Hot 100 chart.

== Content ==
The newspaper, USA Today thinks about doing a story of the loneliest man in the "USA Today".

== Chart performance ==
"USA Today" debuted at number 49 on the U.S. Billboard Hot Country Songs for the week of August 27, 2005.

Chart (2005)	Peak position
US Hot Country Songs (Billboard)	18
US Billboard Bubbling Under Hot 100	7
