= Tell Me the Old, Old Story =

1883 poem and hymn composed by William Howard Doane with lyrics by Katherine Hankey

Tell me the old, old story
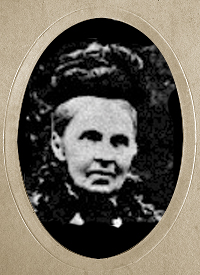
- Katherine Hankey
- Genre: Hymn
- Written: 1866
- Text: Katherine Hankey
- Meter: 7.6.7.6 D
- Melody: "Evangel" by William Howard Doane

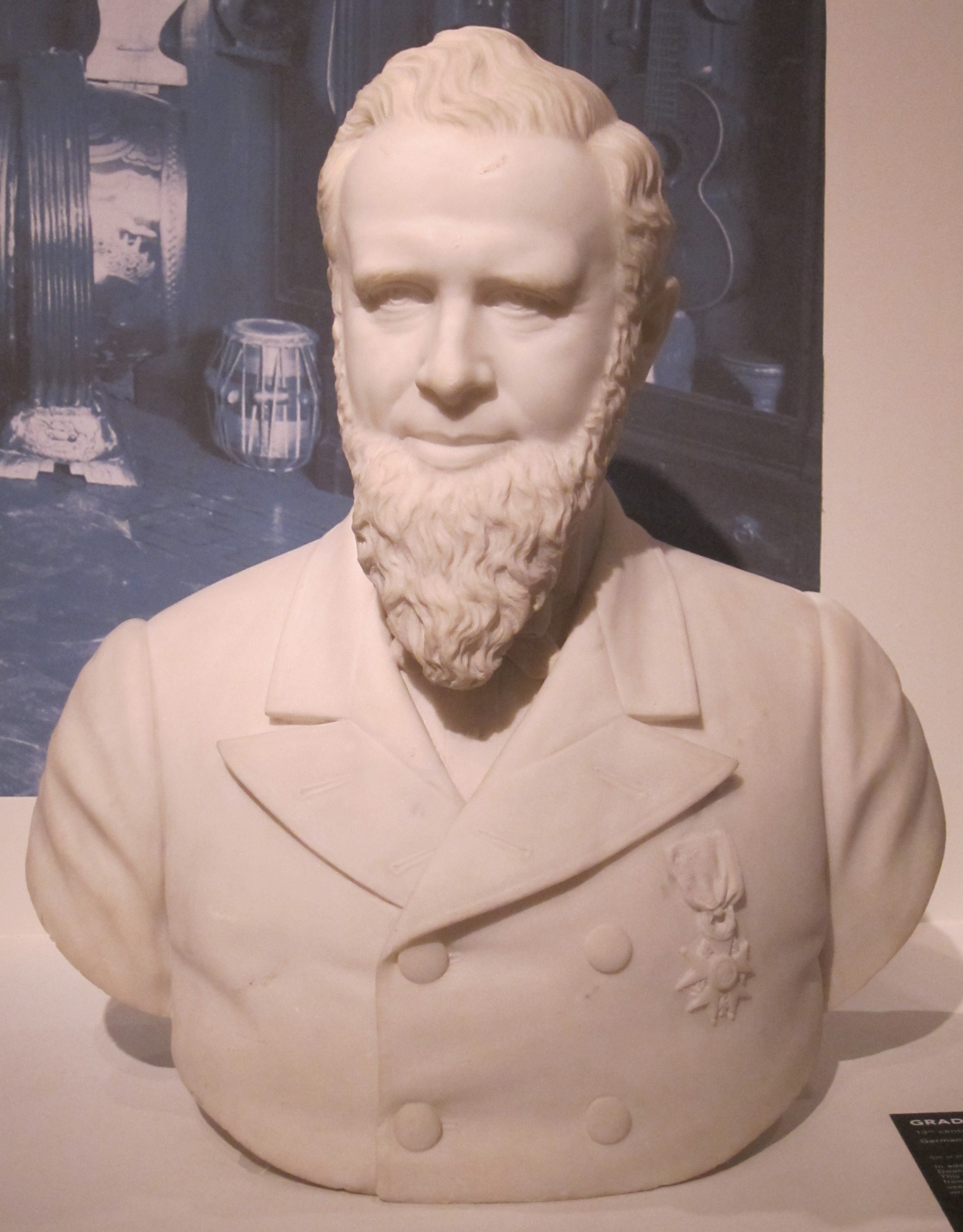
Marble bust of William Howard Doane

"Tell Me the Old, Old Story" is a hymn. The words were written as a poem in 1866 by Katherine Hankey, an English evangelist, while she was recovering from a serious illness in London. It was set to music by William Howard Doane, who was much impressed by the poem when it was recited by Major General David Russell while they were attending an international convention of the YMCA in Montreal in 1867.

== Lyrics ==
Tell me the old, old story
Of unseen things above,
Of Jesus and His glory,
Of Jesus and His love.
Tell me the story simply,
As to a little child,
For I am weak and weary,
And helpless and defiled.

Refrain: Tell me the old, old story,
Tell me the old, old story,
Tell me the old, old story,
Of Jesus and His love.

Tell me the story slowly,
That I may take it in,
That wonderful redemption,
God’s remedy for sin.
Tell me the story often,
For I forget so soon;
The early dew of morning
Has passed away at noon.

Refrain

Tell me the story softly,
With earnest tones and grave;
Remember I’m the sinner
Whom Jesus came to save.
Tell me the story always,
If you would really be,
In any time of trouble,
A comforter to me.

Refrain

Tell me the same old story
When you have cause to fear
That this world’s empty glory
Is costing me too dear.
Yes, and when that world’s glory
Is dawning on my soul,
Tell me the old, old story:
Christ Jesus makes thee whole.

Refrain
