= Gone Crazy =

Single by Alan Jackson

from the album High Mileage
- B-side: "Amarillo"
- Released: January 25, 1999
- Genre: Country
- Length: 3:49
- Label: Arista Nashville 13155
- Songwriter: Alan Jackson
- Producer: Keith Stegall

Alan Jackson singles chronology
"Right on the Money" (1998)	"Gone Crazy" (1999)	"Little Man" (1999)

"Gone Crazy" is a song written and recorded by American country music artist Alan Jackson. It was released in January 1999 as the third single from his album High Mileage, and peaked at No. 4 on the U.S. country singles chart.

== Critical reception ==
Deborah Evans Price, of Billboard magazine reviewed the song favorably, saying that Jackson's "stone-country vocal drips with pain and the remorse of a man who let love slip through calloused hands."

Jeffrey B. Remz of Country Standard Time cited the song as a standout track on High Mileage, calling it a "spare, sad ballad" and saying that the song's theme of lost love was "not surprising" given that Jackson had just separated from, and reunited with, his wife.

== Chart performance ==
"Gone Crazy" debuted at No. 53 on the Billboard Hot Country Singles & Tracks (now Hot Country Songs) charts dated for the week ending February 6, 1999.

Chart (1999)	Peak position
Canada Country Singles (RPM)	2
US Billboard Hot 100	43
US Hot Country Songs (Billboard)	4

=== Year-end charts ===
Chart (1999)	Position
Canada Country Tracks (RPM)	28
US Country Songs (Billboard)	33
