= Monday Morning Church =

Single by Alan Jackson

from the album What I Do
- Released: October 11, 2004
- Recorded: 2004
- Genre: Country
- Length: 3:23
- Label: Arista Nashville
- Songwriters: Brent Baxter; Erin Enderlin
- Producer: Keith Stegall

Alan Jackson singles chronology
"Too Much of a Good Thing" (2004)	"Monday Morning Church" (2004)	"The Talkin' Song Repair Blues" (2005)

"Monday Morning Church" is a song written by Brent Baxter and Erin Enderlin, and recorded by American country music artist Alan Jackson. It was released in October 2004 as the second single from his album What I Do. It peaked at number 5 on the United States Billboard Hot Country Singles & Tracks. It features background vocals from Patty Loveless.

== Background ==
Jackson told Billboard that the song was almost recorded by Lee Ann Womack but he's glad he got it instead. "It's about trying to survive after you've lost a loved one and just how every little thing you touch or see stirs up the memories and makes it hard," Jackson says.

Brent Baxter, one of the writers of the song, was inspired by the song after reading a poem that his mother wrote that included the line, "Empty as a church on Monday morning." He stated that the line had "such religious overtones that [he] had to come up with something really heavy to fit around it." He went on to say that it was fascinating to explore what someone might go through when they lose a loved one. After writing the lyrics, Baxter gave them to Erin Enderlin, a music student at Middle Tennessee State University. Enderlin stated that she related to the lyrics because she had just lost a friend in a car accident, and proceeded to write "a really sad, beautiful melody", before circulating the song in Nashville. After hearing the song, Jackson decided to record it.

== Content ==
The song follows the story of a man grasping for faith after the death of his wife. A preacher stops by to tell him that Jesus loves him but he doubts if he deserves it because he no longer has any faith. He believes that his wife has made it to heaven but that without her, he can't bring himself to believe in God.

== Critical reception ==
Deborah Evans Price, of Billboard magazine reviewed the song favorably, calling it "one of the most potent ballads in country music since George Jones' 'He Stopped Loving Her Today'.

In 2014, Rolling Stone named the song number 39 on its "40 Saddest Country Songs of All Time".

== Music video ==
The music video was directed by Kristin Barlowe, and features a man who's struggling through his house, and running to a church, struggling from a lost lover.

== Chart performance ==
"Monday Morning Church" debuted at number 47 on the U.S. Billboard Hot Country Singles & Tracks for the week of October 16, 2004.

Chart (2004–2005)	Peak position
US Hot Country Songs (Billboard)	5
US Billboard Hot 100	54

=== Year-end charts ===
Chart (2005)	Position
US Country Songs (Billboard)	34
