= Gone Country =

Single by Alan Jackson

from the album Who I Am
- B-side: "All American Country Boy"
- Released: November 15, 1994
- Recorded: January 11, 1994
- Genre: Country, country rock
- Length: 4:20
- Label: Arista
- Songwriter: Bob McDill
- Producer: Keith Stegall

Alan Jackson singles chronology
"A Good Year for the Roses" (1994)	"Gone Country" (1994)	"Song for the Life" (1995)

"Gone Country" is a song written by Bob McDill and recorded by American country music artist Alan Jackson. It was released in November 1994 as the third single from his fourth major-label studio album, Who I Am. As with that album's first two singles ("Summertime Blues" and "Livin' on Love"), "Gone Country" reached the top of the Billboard Hot Country Singles & Tracks (now Hot Country Songs) charts, a position that it held for one week.

== Content ==
"Gone Country" served as a commentary on the country music scene, illustrating three examples of other singers (a lounge singer in Las Vegas from Long Island, New York; a folk rocker in Greenwich Village; and a "serious composer schooled in voice and composition" who commutes to L.A. from the San Fernando Valley), all of whom find that their respective careers are failing, and as a result, they decide to begin performing country music instead. Alan Jackson said about the song: "Bob McDill wrote this and he is one of my favorite writers of all time. When I first heard this song I fell in love with it. I wish that I'd written it cause it says a lot of things that I'd like to say. I think it's just a fun song actually, celebrating how country music has become more widespread and accepted by all types of people all over the country."

== Cover versions ==
Country music singers Miranda Lambert and Lee Ann Womack covered the song from the television special CMT Giants: Alan Jackson.

== Critical reception ==
Deborah Evans Price, of Billboard magazine reviewed the song favorably, saying that it was "the most talked-about country song of the year, and deservedly so." She goes on to say that it is "an ode to all the carpetbaggers flowing into Music City. Musically, it kicks ass."

== Music video ==
The video was directed by Michael Oblowitz, and filmed in New York City atop 622 3rd Avenue, as well as in Knoxville, Tennessee, and Las Vegas. The concert scenes in the video were shot in Evansville, Indiana, at Roberts Municipal Stadium, and in Knoxville. It features the former World Trade Center Towers in a flyover.

== Charts ==
Chart (1994–1995)	Peak position
Canada Country Singles (RPM)	2
US Hot Country Songs (Billboard)	1

=== Year-end charts ===
Chart (1995)	Position
Canada Country Tracks (RPM)	55

== Certifications ==
Region	Certification	Certified units/sales
United States (RIAA)	2× Platinum	2,000,000^{‡}
^{‡} Sales+streaming figures based on certification alone.

== Parodies ==
- Jackson himself adopted the tune in commercials for the Ford Motor Company in the late 1990s, titling the track "Ford Country."
- American country music parody artist Cledus T. Judd released a parody of "Gone Country" titled "Gone Funky" on his 1995 album Cledus T. Judd (No Relation).
- The comedy podcast PolitiPod released a parody about a supporter of Donald Trump titled "Gone Trumpin'" in their 2020 "Minisode #3."
