= Chattahoochee (song) =

Single by Alan Jackson

from the album A Lot About Livin' (And a Little 'bout Love)
- B-side: "I Don't Need the Booze (To Get a Buzz On)"
- Released: May 17, 1993
- Recorded: 1992
- Genre: Country
- Length: 2:27 (album version); 3:56 (extended mix); 4:06 (extended remix/video mix); 3:06 (Remix)
- Label: Arista Nashville 20962
- Songwriters: Alan Jackson; Jim McBride
- Producer: Keith Stegall

Alan Jackson singles chronology
"Tonight I Climbed the Wall" (1993)	"Chattahoochee" (1993)	"Mercury Blues" (1993)

Music video
- "Chattahoochee" on YouTube

"Chattahoochee" is a song co-written and recorded by American country music artist Alan Jackson. It was released in May 1993 as the third single from his album A Lot About Livin' (And a Little 'bout Love). The album is named for a line in the song itself. Jackson wrote the song with Jim McBride. It is one of Jackson's most popular and well-known country songs, being included on his 2015 box set Genuine: The Alan Jackson Story.

"Chattahoochee" also received CMA awards for Single of the Year and Song of the Year.

== Background and writing ==
Alan Jackson talks about the song in the liner notes for his 1995 compilation album, The Greatest Hits Collection: "Jim McBride and I were trying to write an up-tempo song and Jim came in with the line 'way down yonder on the Chattahoochee'. It kind of went from there. It's a song about having fun, growing up, and coming of age in a small town - which really applies to anyone across the country, not just by the Chattahoochee. We never thought it would be as big as it's become."

== Content ==
The song is uptempo and talks about growing up and falling in love along the Chattahoochee River that flows from northern Georgia and forms part of the borders that Georgia shares with both Alabama and Florida.

== Critical reception ==
Kevin John Coyne of Country Universe gave the song an A grade, saying that the song could have performed well because it "looked back on the innocence of adolescence with bemusement and fondness for that transitional period of life."

== Music video ==
The music video was directed by Martin Kahan, premiered in May 1993, and uses the extended remix of the song. The video is remembered for Jackson water-skiing in his red cowboy boots and red life vest.

== Chart performance ==
"Chattahoochee" debuted at No. 72 on the U.S. Billboard Hot Country Singles & Tracks for the week of May 15, 1993. It also peaked at No. 46 on the Billboard Hot 100, becoming Jackson's first Hot 100 entry. It was certified three-times platinum by the Recording Industry Association of America.

== Charts ==
=== Weekly charts ===
Chart (1993)	Peak position
Canada Country Singles (RPM)	1
US Billboard Hot 100	46
US Hot Country Songs (Billboard)	1
US Cash Box Top 100	44

=== Year-end charts ===
Chart (1993)	Position
Canada Country Tracks (RPM)	8
US Country Songs (Billboard)	1

== Certifications ==
Region	Certification	Certified units/sales
New Zealand (RMNZ)	Platinum	30,000^{‡}
United States (RIAA)	5× Platinum	5,000,000^{‡}
^{‡} Sales+streaming figures based on certification alone.
