= High Mileage =

Studio album by Alan Jackson
- Released: September 1, 1998
- Genre: Country
- Length: 38:16
- Label: Arista Nashville
- Producer: Keith Stegall

Alan Jackson chronology
| Everything I Love (1996) | High Mileage (1998) | Super Hits (1999) |

Singles from High Mileage
- 1. "I'll Go On Loving You" Released: July 27, 1998; 2. "Right on the Money" Released: October 19, 1998; 3. "Gone Crazy" Released: January 25, 1999; 4. "Little Man" Released: May 31, 1999

Professional ratings
Review scores
| Source | Rating |
|---|---|
| AllMusic | 4/5 stars |
| Chicago Tribune | (positive) |
| Entertainment Weekly | B |
| Q | 3/5 stars |
| The Rolling Stone Album Guide | 2/5 stars |

High Mileage is the seventh studio album by American country music artist Alan Jackson. It was released on September 1, 1998, and produced four hit singles on the Hot Country Songs charts for Jackson: "I'll Go on Loving You" (#3), "Right on the Money" (#1), "Gone Crazy" (#4) and "Little Man" (#3). Upon its release in late 1998, "I'll Go on Loving You" became the highest-debuting single of Jackson's career at the time, entering the country charts at #35.

Also included here is the track "A Woman's Love", which Jackson re-recorded in 2006 for his album Like Red on a Rose. The re-recorded version on that album was released as a single in 2007, peaking at #5 that year.

== Background ==
During the release of his 2000 album, When Somebody Loves You, Jackson reflected on the album on Arista's website: " I guess the last album I made -- not the cover-song album, Under the Influence, but High Mileage was a little on the dark side. [Laughs] I love that album, but some of it's a little heavy. Of course, some of my life was a little dark at that time, and that's probably why it ended up that way. I guess this one reflects a little more of what I feel today. "

== Track listing ==
| No. | Title | Writer(s) | Length |
|---|---|---|---|
| 1. | "Right on the Money" | Charlie Black, Phil Vassar | 3:49 |
| 2. | "Gone Crazy" | Alan Jackson | 3:49 |
| 3. | "Little Man" | Jackson | 4:28 |
| 4. | "What a Day Yesterday Was" | Mel Besher, Charlie Craig | 3:47 |
| 5. | "Hurtin' Comes Easy" | Jackson | 3:01 |
| 6. | "I'll Go On Loving You" | Kieran Kane | 3:58 |
| 7. | "Another Good Reason" | Harley Allen, Carson Chamberlain | 4:26 |
| 8. | "A Woman's Love" | Jackson | 3:53 |
| 9. | "Dancin' All Around It" | Chamberlain, Brian Tabor, Michael White | 2:56 |
| 10. | "Amarillo" | Jackson | 4:11 |

== Personnel ==
- Alan Jackson - acoustic guitar, lead vocals
- Bob Adcock - cello
- Vage Ayrikyan - cello
- Eddie Bayers - drums
- Bob Becker - viola
- Jodi Burnett - cello
- Larry Corbett - cello
- J. T. Corenflos - electric guitar
- Bruce Dembow - viola
- Steve Dorff - string arrangements, conductor
- Bruce Dukov - violin
- Stuart Duncan - fiddle, mandolin
- Robbie Flint - steel guitar, silvertone
- Larry Franklin - fiddle
- Paul Franklin - steel guitar
- Berj Garabedian - violin
- Keith Greene - viola
- Danny Groah - electric guitar
- Alan Grunfeld - violin
- Paula Hochhalter - cello
- Pat Johnson - violin
- Dennis Karmazyn - cello
- Janet Lakatos - viola
- Brent Mason - electric guitar
- Monty Parkey - keyboards, piano
- Katia Popov - violin
- Rachel Purkin - violin
- Hargus "Pig" Robbins - keyboards
- Gil Romero - violin
- Bruce Rutherford - drums, congas
- Tom Rutledge - Dobro, acoustic guitar, mandolin
- John Wesley Ryles - backing vocals
- Sheldon Sanov - violin
- John Scanlon - viola
- Daniel Shindaryov - violin
- Harry Shirinian - viola
- Roman Volodarsky - violin
- Bruce Watkins - acoustic guitar
- Roger Wills - bass guitar
- Glenn Worf - bass guitar

== Charts ==
High Mileage peaked at #4 on the U.S. Billboard 200, and peaked at #1 on the Top Country Albums selling 97,000 copies, his fourth #1 Country album. In October 1998, High Mileage was certified platinum by the RIAA.

=== Weekly charts ===
| Chart (1998) | Peak position |
|---|---|
| Australian Albums (ARIA) | 32 |
| Canadian Albums (RPM) | 28 |
| Canadian Country Albums (RPM) | 1 |
| US Billboard 200 | 4 |
| US Top Country Albums (Billboard) | 1 |

=== Year-end charts ===
| Chart (1998) | Position |
|---|---|
| US Billboard 200 | 145 |
| US Top Country Albums (Billboard) | 18 |

| Chart (1999) | Position |
|---|---|
| US Billboard 200 | 191 |
| US Top Country Albums (Billboard) | 14 |

== Certifications ==
Certifications for High Mileage
| Region | Certification | Certified units/sales |
|---|---|---|
| Canada (Music Canada) | Platinum | 100,000^{^} |
| United States (RIAA) | Platinum | 1,000,000^{^} |
^{^} Shipments figures based on certification alone.
