= I Don't Even Know Your Name =

Single by Alan Jackson

from the album Who I Am
- B-side: "If I Had You"
- Released: May 15, 1995
- Recorded: January 12, 1994
- Genre: Country, country rock, rockabilly
- Length: 3:49
- Label: Arista 12830
- Songwriters: Alan Jackson; Ron Jackson; Andy Loftin
- Producer: Keith Stegall

Alan Jackson singles chronology
| "Song for the Life" (1995) | "I Don't Even Know Your Name" (1995) | "Tall, Tall Trees" (1995) |

"I Don't Even Know Your Name" is a song co-written and recorded by American country music artist Alan Jackson. It was released in May 1995 as the fifth and final single from his album Who I Am. It reached number-one on the U.S. Billboard country charts and on the Canadian RPM Country Tracks chart. It was written by Jackson with Ron Jackson and Andy Loftin.

== Background and writing ==
Alan Jackson commented that the song was written as a joke by request of some family members. While on tour in 1993, he decided to write it and record it. After he gave the demo tape to his brother in-law, everybody wanted to hear the song so he put it on Who I Am.

== Content ==
The song begins with a man who is "sitting at a roadhouse." As his waitress, who noticeably has a missing left front tooth, takes his order, another waitress at the roadhouse catches his eye. Over the course of the song, the singer falls in love with the other waitress, winds up intoxicated, blacks out, and comes to his senses in the middle of his own wedding; as it turns out, he has now been unwittingly married to the waitress with the missing tooth. All the while, none of the three characters know each other's names.

== Music video ==
The video for "I Don't Even Know Your Name" starred Jeff Foxworthy as the song's male character.

== Chart positions ==
"I Don't Even Know Your Name" debuted at number 75 on the U.S. Billboard Hot Country Singles & Tracks for the week of May 13, 1995.

| Chart (1995) | Peak position |
|---|---|
| Canada Country Singles (RPM) | 4 |
| US Hot Country Songs (Billboard) | 1 |

=== Year-end charts ===
| Chart (1995) | Position |
|---|---|
| Canada Country Tracks (RPM) | 70 |
| US Country Songs (Billboard) | 26 |
