= A Lot About Livin' (And a Little 'bout Love) =

1992 Alan Jackson album

A Lot about Livin' (and a Little 'bout Love)

Studio album by Alan Jackson
- Released: October 6, 1992
- Recorded: May–June 1992
- Studios: Cayman Moon Recorders; Recording Arts; Sound Emporium (Nashville, Tennessee); Castle Recording Studio (Franklin, Tennessee)
- Genres: Neotraditional country; blues
- Length: 31:15
- Label: Arista
- Producers: Keith Stegall "Tonight I Climbed the Wall" co-produced by Scott Hendricks

Alan Jackson chronology
Don't Rock the Jukebox (1991)	A Lot about Livin' (and a Little 'bout Love) (1992)	Honky Tonk Christmas (1993)

Singles from A Lot about Livin' (and a Little 'bout Love)
- 1. "She's Got the Rhythm (And I Got the Blues)" Released: October 5, 1992; 2. "Tonight I Climbed the Wall" Released: January 25, 1993; 3. "Chattahoochee" Released: May 21, 1993; 4. "Mercury Blues" Released: September 13, 1993; 5. "(Who Says) You Can't Have It All" Released: January 24, 1994

Professional ratings
Review scores
Source	Rating
AllMusic	5/5 stars
Entertainment Weekly	A
Q	3/5 stars
The Rolling Stone Album Guide	3/5 stars

A Lot about Livin' (and a Little 'bout Love) is the third studio album by American country music artist Alan Jackson. It was released on October 6, 1992, and produced the singles, "Chattahoochee", "She's Got the Rhythm (and I Got the Blues)", "Tonight I Climbed the Wall", "(Who Says) You Can't Have It All", and "Mercury Blues". "Chattahoochee" and "She's Got the Rhythm (and I Got the Blues)" were both #1 hits on the Hot Country Songs charts, while the other three songs all reached Top 5. Additionally, "Tropical Depression" peaked at #75 based on unsolicited airplay.

Keith Stegall produced the entire album, working with Scott Hendricks on "Tonight I Climbed the Wall".

== Commercial performance ==
A Lot about Livin' (and a Little 'bout Love) peaked at #13 on the U.S. Billboard 200 and #1 on the Top Country Albums, becoming Alan Jackson's first #1 country album. In January 1996, A Lot about Livin' (and a Little 'bout Love) was certified 6× Platinum by the RIAA.

== Track listing ==
No.	Title	Writer(s)	Length
1.	"Chattahoochee"	Alan Jackson, Jim McBride	2:29
2.	"She's Got the Rhythm (And I Got the Blues)"	Jackson, Randy Travis	2:25
3.	"Tonight I Climbed the Wall"	Jackson	3:30
4.	"I Don't Need the Booze (to Get a Buzz On)"	Toni Dae, Joy Swinea	3:15
5.	"(Who Says) You Can't Have It All"	Jackson, McBride	3:29
6.	"Up to My Ears in Tears"	Jackson, Don Sampson	2:53
7.	"Tropical Depression"	Charlie Craig, Jackson, McBride	2:57
8.	"She Likes It Too"	Zack Turner, Tim Nichols	2:50
9.	"If It Ain't One Thing (It's You)"	Jackson, McBride	3:52
10.	"Mercury Blues"	K. C. Douglas, Bob Geddins	3:39

== Personnel ==
- Alan Jackson – lead vocals
- Eddie Bayers – drums
- Stuart Duncan – fiddle
- Robbie Flint – acoustic slide guitar
- Paul Franklin – pedal steel guitar
- Rob Hajacos – fiddle
- Roy Huskey Jr. – double bass
- Brent Mason – electric guitar
- Weldon Myrick – pedal steel guitar
- Hargus "Pig" Robbins – piano
- Bruce Rutherford – backing vocals
- Hank Singer – fiddle
- Keith Stegall – acoustic guitar
- Bruce Watkins – acoustic guitar
- Glenn Worf – bass guitar

== Charts ==
=== Weekly charts ===
Chart (1992–1993)	Peak position
Canadian Albums (RPM)	22
Canadian Country Albums (RPM)	5
US Billboard 200	13
US Top Country Albums (Billboard)	1

=== Year-end charts ===
Chart (1992)	Position
US Top Country Albums (Billboard)	64
Chart (1993)	Position
US Billboard 200	25
US Top Country Albums (Billboard)	6
Chart (1994)	Position
US Billboard 200	48
US Top Country Albums (Billboard)	6
Chart (1995)	Position
US Top Country Albums (Billboard)	39

== Certifications ==
Certifications for A Lot About Livin' (And a Little 'bout Love)
Region	Certification	Certified units/sales
Australia (ARIA)	Gold	35,000^{^}
Canada (Music Canada)	3× Platinum	300,000^{^}
United States (RIAA)	6× Platinum	6,000,000^{^}
^{^} Shipments figures based on certification alone.

== Accolades ==
Academy of Country Music

- Single Record of the Year, "Chattahoochee" 1993
- Album of the Year, 1993

Country Music Association

- Single of the Year, "Chattahoochee" 1993
- Music Video of the Year, "Chattahoochee" 1993
- Song of the Year, "Chattahoochee" 1994
