= What I Do =

Studio album by Alan Jackson
- Released: September 7, 2004
- Genre: Country
- Length: 44:42
- Label: Arista Nashville
- Producer: Keith Stegall

Alan Jackson chronology
The Very Best of Alan Jackson (2004)	What I Do (2004)	Precious Memories (2006)

Singles from What I Do
- 1. "Too Much of a Good Thing" Released: June 21, 2004; 2. "Monday Morning Church" Released: October 11, 2004; 3. "The Talkin' Song Repair Blues" Released: March 21, 2005; 4. "USA Today" Released: August 22, 2005

What I Do is the twelfth studio album by American country music artist Alan Jackson. It was released on September 7, 2004, and produced four singles for Jackson on the Hot Country Songs charts: "Too Much of a Good Thing" and "Monday Morning Church" both reached #5, while "The Talkin' Song Repair Blues" and "USA Today" both reached #18, making this album the first of Jackson's career not to produce any #1 hits.

The Wrights, a duo composed of Adam and Shannon Wright (the former of whom is Jackson's nephew) are featured as background vocalists on "If Love Was a River", which they also co-wrote. Adam Wright also wrote the track "Strong Enough".

== Critical reception ==
Professional ratings
Aggregate scores
Source	Rating
Metacritic	(80/100)
Review scores
Source	Rating
AllMusic	4.5/5 stars
BBC Music	(favorable)
Blender	4.5/5 stars
Entertainment Weekly	B+
Los Angeles Times	3/4 stars
The New York Times	(favorable)
People	4/4 stars
Robert Christgau	(choice cut)
Rolling Stone	3/5 stars
The Village Voice	(positiv)

Giving the album all four stars, People magazine said on the album that Jackson "continues to sound more and more like Merle Haggard, which is tantamount to approaching perfection."

== Track listing ==
No.	Title	Writer(s)	Length
1.	"Too Much of a Good Thing"	Alan Jackson	3:08
2.	"Rainy Day in June"	Jackson	4:40
3.	"USA Today"	Jackson	3:26
4.	"If Love Was a River" (background vocals: The Wrights)	Adam Wright, Shannon Wright	3:54
5.	"If French Fries Were Fat Free"	Jackson	4:16
6.	"You Don't Have to Paint Me a Picture"	Jackson	3:45
7.	"There Ya Go"	Dan Hill, Keith Stegall	3:13
8.	"The Talkin' Song Repair Blues"	Dennis Linde	2:58
9.	"Strong Enough"	A. Wright	4:04
10.	"Monday Morning Church" (background vocals: Patty Loveless)	Brent Baxter, Erin Enderlin	3:23
11.	"Burnin' the Honky Tonks Down" (background vocals: Richard Sterban of The Oak Ridge Boys)	Billy Burnette, Shawn Camp	4:53
12.	"To Do What I Do" (Live)	Tim Johnson	3:00

== Personnel ==
- Monty Allen – background vocals
- Eddie Bayers – drums
- Stuart Duncan – fiddle, mandolin
- Mark Fain – bass guitar
- Robbie Flint – steel guitar
- Paul Franklin – steel guitar, lap steel guitar
- Dave Gaylord – fiddle
- Lloyd Green – steel guitar
- Danny Groah – electric guitar
- Alan Jackson – acoustic guitar, lead vocals, background vocals
- Kirk "Jelly Roll" Johnson – harmonica
- Dave Kelley – mandolin
- Patty Loveless – background vocals on "Monday Morning Church"
- Brent Mason – electric guitar, six-string bass guitar
- Monty Parkey – piano
- Hargus "Pig" Robbins – piano
- Matt Rollings – piano
- Bruce Rutherford – drums
- Tom Rutledge – acoustic guitar
- John Wesley Ryles – background vocals
- Tony Stephens – acoustic guitar
- Richard Sterban – background vocals on "Burnin' the Honky Tonks Down"
- Bruce Watkins – acoustic guitar, banjo
- Roger Wills – bass guitar
- Glenn Worf – bass guitar
- Adam Wright – background vocals on "If Love Was a River"
- Shannon Wright – background vocals on "If Love Was a River"

== Chart performance ==
What I Do debuted at #1 on the U.S. Billboard 200 selling 139,000 copies, becoming his third #1 album, and #1 on the Top Country Albums, becoming his seventh #1 country album. The album was certified Platinum by the RIAA in October 2004.

=== Weekly charts ===
Chart (2004)	Peak position
Australian Albums (ARIA)	7
Canadian Albums (Billboard)	2
Norwegian Albums (VG-lista)	10
US Billboard 200	1
US Top Country Albums (Billboard)	1

=== Year-end charts ===
Chart (2004)	Position
US Billboard 200	157
US Top Country Albums (Billboard)	28
Chart (2005)	Position
US Top Country Albums (Billboard)	35

== Certifications ==
Certifications for What I Do
Region	Certification	Certified units/sales
United States (RIAA)	Platinum	1,000,000^{^}
^{^} Shipments figures based on certification alone.
