= Like Red on a Rose =

Studio album by Alan Jackson
- Released: September 26, 2006
- Genres: Country, soft rock, adult contemporary
- Length: 49:23
- Label: Arista Nashville
- Producer: Alison Krauss

Alan Jackson chronology
Precious Memories (2006)	Like Red on a Rose (2006)	Live at Texas Stadium (2007)

Singles from Like Red on a Rose
- 1. "Like Red on a Rose" Released: July 24, 2006; 2. "A Woman's Love" Released: January 8, 2007

Professional ratings
Aggregate scores
Source	Rating
Metacritic	(83/100)
Review scores
Source	Rating
About.com	3/5 stars
AllMusic	4.5/5 stars
Country Weekly	(average)
Entertainment Weekly	A−
The Music Box	3.5/5 stars
No Depression	(mixed)
People	3.5/4 stars
PopMatters	6/10 stars
Slant	4/5 stars
Stylus Magazine	A−
The Village Voice	(favorable)
Yahoo! Music	(favorable)

Like Red on a Rose is the fourteenth studio album by American country music artist Alan Jackson. It was released on September 26, 2006. The album produced two singles, the title track and "A Woman's Love", which respectively reached numbers 15 and 5 on the Hot Country Songs charts.

This album was produced by singer Alison Krauss, who also selected the songs. "A Woman's Love", a re-recording of a song previously included on Jackson's 1998 High Mileage album, was the only song written by Jackson. It is Jackson's only album to date to not involve producer Keith Stegall and exchanges his normal traditional country sound for a soft rock/adult contemporary sound.

== Track listing ==
No.	Title	Writer(s)	Length
1.	"Anywhere on Earth You Are"	Tim Krekel, Danny O'Keefe	4:13
2.	"Good Imitation of the Blues"	Patrick Brayer	3:23
3.	"Like Red on a Rose"	Robert Lee Castleman, Melanie Castleman	3:32
4.	"Nobody Said That It Would Be Easy"	R. Castleman, M. Castleman	3:44
5.	"Don't Change on Me"	Jimmy Holiday, Eddie Reeves	3:26
6.	"The Firefly's Song"	R. Castleman	3:56
7.	"Wait a Minute"	Herb Pedersen	4:22
8.	"Had It Not Been You"	Sidney Cox	4:01
9.	"A Woman's Love"	Alan Jackson	4:13
10.	"Don't Ask Why"	Roy Freeland, Bill LaBounty	3:01
11.	"As Lovely As You"	John Pennell	4:05
12.	"Where Do I Go From Here (A Trucker's Song)"	R. Castleman, Stephen Foster	4:02
13.	"Bluebird"	Leon Russell	3:25
Total length:			49:23

== Personnel ==
Adapted from the album's liner notes.

=== Musicians ===
- Ron Block – acoustic guitar, twin electric guitars on "A Woman's Love"
- Jim Cox – Fender Rhodes, Hammond B-3 organ, Wurlitzer
- Jerry Douglas – lap steel guitar, Dobro
- Alan Jackson – lead vocals
- Alison Krauss – strings
- Viktor Krauss – bass guitar, upright bass
- Howard Levy – harmonica
- Michael McDonald – clavinet, Fender Rhodes
- Joey Miskulin – accordion
- Gordon Mote – piano, Fender Rhodes, Hammond B-3 organ
- The Nashville String Machine – strings on "A Woman's Love" and "Had It Not Been You"
- Bernard Purdie – drums
- Kenny Vaughan – electric guitar

=== Backing vocalists ===
- Sam Bush
- Sidney Cox
- Suzanne Cox
- Dave Denman
- Alison Krauss
- Richard Sterban
- Dan Tyminski
- Cheryl White
- Lee Ann Womack

=== Technical ===
- Carl Gorodetzky – string contractor
- Alison Krauss – producer
- Michael Omartian – string arranger and conductor
- Gary Paczosa – Recording Engineer, Mix Engineer
- Brandon Bell – Recording Engineer
- Joey Crawford – Assistant Recording Engineer
- Greg Lawrence – Assistant Recording Engineer
- Terry Christian – Recording Engineer (for String Session)
- Doug Sax – Mastering Engineer
- Sangwook Nam – Mastering Engineer

== Charts and certifications ==
Like Red on a Rose debuted at No. 4 on the U.S. Billboard 200, and No. 1 on the Top Country Albums selling 86,000 copies, becoming his ninth No. 1 country album. The album was certified Gold by the RIAA in January 2007.

=== Weekly charts ===
Chart (2006)	Peak position
Australian Albums (ARIA)	41
Canadian Albums (Billboard)	8
Norwegian Albums (VG-lista)	11
US Billboard 200	4
US Top Country Albums (Billboard)	1

=== Year-end charts ===
Chart (2006)	Position
US Billboard 200	157
US Top Country Albums (Billboard)	32

Chart (2007)	Position
US Billboard 200	158
US Top Country Albums (Billboard)	28

=== Singles ===
Year	Single	Chart Positions		
Year	Single	US Country	US	US Pop
2006	"Like Red on a Rose"	15	80	99
2007	"A Woman's Love"	5	73	—

=== Sales and certifications ===
Region	Provider	Certification	Sales/Shipments
United States	RIAA	Gold	841,000
