= 2002 in country music =

This is a list of notable events in country music that took place in the year 2002.

== Events ==
- January 13 - CMT premieres CMT Crossroads, which features country music artists being paired with artists from other genres. The show has since become one of the channel's most successful programs; the first episode featured Lucinda Williams and Elvis Costello.
- May 27 - Toby Keith releases "Courtesy of the Red, White and Blue (The Angry American)"; written in response to the death of Keith's father and the September 11, 2001 attacks, the song stirs up controversy for the line "We'll put a boot in your ass/It's the American way". Canadian-born newsman Peter Jennings and Dixie Chicks frontwoman Natalie Maines both express criticism of the song, with a feud with the latter lasting for a year.
- October 7 - Toby Keith begins airing in television spots as the spokesman for Ford, with his original composition, "Ford Truck Man", during that night's broadcast of Monday Night Football.
- November 19 – Shania Twain returned with her fourth album, Up!. It opened at No. 1 on the Billboard 200 chart with 874,000 copies; the album remained atop the chart until the new year.
- The Statler Brothers retire from touring and singing together at their Farewell Concert in Salem, Virginia. Jimmy Fortune continued his career as a solo artist.
- Kitty Wells celebrates her 50th Grand Ole Opry anniversary

== Top hits of the year ==
The following songs placed within the Top 20 on the Hot Country Songs charts in 2002:

US	Single	Artist	Reference
18	All Over Me	Blake Shelton	
5	American Child	Phil Vassar	
1	Beautiful Mess	Diamond Rio	
15	Before I Knew Better	Brad Martin	
1	Blessed	Martina McBride	
1	Bring On the Rain	Jo Dee Messina with Tim McGraw	
1	Courtesy of the Red, White and Blue (The Angry American)	Toby Keith	
1	The Cowboy in Me	Tim McGraw	
12	Cry	Faith Hill	
1	Drive (For Daddy Gene)	Alan Jackson	
12	Every River	Brooks & Dunn	
12	Forgive	Rebecca Lynn Howard	
1	Good Morning Beautiful	Steve Holy	
1	The Good Stuff	Kenny Chesney	
17	Help Me Understand	Trace Adkins	
1	I Breathe In, I Breathe Out	Chris Cagle	
18	I Cry	Tammy Cochran	
2	I Don't Have to Be Me ('til Monday)	Steve Azar	
7	I Don't Want You to Go	Carolyn Dawn Johnson	
5	I Keep Looking	Sara Evans	
1	I Miss My Friend	Darryl Worley	
4	I Should Be Sleeping	Emerson Drive	
7	I'm Gonna Getcha Good!	Shania Twain	
1	I'm Gonna Miss Her (The Fishin' Song)	Brad Paisley	
4	I'm Movin' On	Rascal Flatts	
3	The Impossible	Joe Nichols	
10	In Another World	Joe Diffie	
9	Just Let Me Be in Love	Tracy Byrd	
13	Just What I Do	Trick Pony	
2	Landslide	Dixie Chicks	
20	Life Happened	Tammy Cochran	
1	Living and Living Well	George Strait	
1	The Long Goodbye	Brooks & Dunn	
2	Long Time Gone	Dixie Chicks	
8	Modern Day Bonnie and Clyde	Travis Tritt	
5	My Heart Is Lost to You	Brooks & Dunn	
1	My List	Toby Keith	
5	My Town	Montgomery Gentry	
3	Not a Day Goes By	Lonestar	
14	Ol' Red	Blake Shelton	
3	The One	Gary Allan	
5	Red Ragtop	Tim McGraw	
16	Saints & Angels	Sara Evans	
11	She Was	Mark Chesnutt	
1	She'll Leave You with a Smile	George Strait	
7	Some Days You Gotta Dance	Dixie Chicks	
1	Somebody Like You	Keith Urban	
20	Something Worth Leaving Behind	Lee Ann Womack	
16	Squeeze Me In	Garth Brooks duet with Trisha Yearwood	
13	Strong Enough to Be Your Man	Travis Tritt	
1	Ten Rounds with Jose Cuervo	Tracy Byrd	
16	That's Just Jessie	Kevin Denney	
3	That's When I Love You	Phil Vassar	
1	These Days	Rascal Flatts	
18	Thicker Than Blood	Garth Brooks	
19	'Til Nothing Comes Between Us	John Michael Montgomery	
7	Tonight I Wanna Be Your Man	Andy Griggs	
1	Unbroken	Tim McGraw	
2	What If She's an Angel	Tommy Shane Steiner	
8	When You Lie Next to Me	Kellie Coffey	
2	Where the Stars and Stripes and the Eagle Fly	Aaron Tippin	
3	Where Would You Be	Martina McBride	
1	Who's Your Daddy?	Toby Keith	
3	Work in Progress	Alan Jackson	
2	Wrapped Around	Brad Paisley	
5	Wrapped Up in You	Garth Brooks	
2	Young	Kenny Chesney	

== Top new album releases ==
The following albums placed within the Top 50 on the Top Country Albums charts in 2002:

US	Album	Artist	Record label	Reference
8	20th Century Masters: The Millennium Collection	George Strait	MCA Nashville	
9	The Almeria Club Recordings	Hank Williams, Jr.	Curb	
4	American Child	Phil Vassar	Arista Nashville	
2	American IV: The Man Comes Around	Johnny Cash	Lost Highway	
3	Completely	Diamond Rio	Arista Nashville	
1	Cry	Faith Hill	Warner Bros.	
1	Drive	Alan Jackson	Arista Nashville	
1	Elv1s: 30 #1 Hits	Elvis Presley	RCA	
5	Forgive	Rebecca Lynn Howard	MCA Nashville	
7	Freedom	Andy Griggs	RCA Nashville	
2	Golden Road	Keith Urban	Capitol Nashville	
5	The Great Divide	Willie Nelson	Lost Highway	
4	Halos & Horns	Dolly Parton	Blue Eye	
1	Home	Dixie Chicks	Open Wide	
1	I Miss My Friend	Darryl Worley	DreamWorks Nashville	
7	Jerusalem	Steve Earle	E-Squared	
3	Knock on the Sky	SHeDAISY	Lyric Street	
6	Let It Be Christmas	Alan Jackson	Arista Nashville	
9	Live	Alison Krauss & Union Station	Rounder	
9	Man with a Memory	Joe Nichols	Universal South	
1	Melt	Rascal Flatts	Lyric Street	
3	My Town	Montgomery Gentry	Columbia	
1	No Shoes, No Shirt, No Problems	Kenny Chesney	BNA	
8	Rise and Shine	Randy Travis	Word/Curb	
7	Sharp Dressed Men: A Tribute to ZZ Top	Various Artists	RCA Nashville	
9	Side Tracks	Steve Earle	E-Squared	
2	Something Worth Leaving Behind	Lee Ann Womack	MCA Nashville	
10	Stars & Stripes	Aaron Tippin	Lyric Street	
4	Strong Enough	Travis Tritt	Columbia	
6	Then Came the Night	Tommy Shane Steiner	RCA Nashville	
2	This Side	Nickel Creek	Sugar Hill	
2	Tim McGraw and the Dancehall Doctors	Tim McGraw	Curb	
2	Totally Country	Various Artists	BNA	
5	Totally Country Vol. 2	Various Artists	Epic	
3	Twisted Angel	LeAnn Rimes	Curb	
1	Unleashed	Toby Keith	DreamWorks Nashville	
1	Up!	Shania Twain	Mercury Nashville	
5	When You Lie Next to Me	Kellie Coffey	BNA	

=== Other top albums ===
US	Album	Artist	Record label
47	20th Century Masters: The Millennium Collection	Johnny Cash	Mercury Nashville
14	After the Storm	Chris LeDoux	Capitol Nashville
39	Another Way to Go	Radney Foster	Dualtone
13	Barricades & Brickwalls	Kasey Chambers	Warner Bros.
46	The Best of America	Various Artists	Curb
20	Bluegrass & White Snow: A Mountain Christmas	Patty Loveless	Epic
47	Bramble Rose	Tift Merritt	Lost Highway
39	Can You Hear Me Now	Sawyer Brown	Curb
39	Can't Back Down	Collin Raye	Epic
35	Chase the Sun	Shannon Lawson	MCA Nashville
37	Cheap Drunk: An Autobiography	Bill Engvall	Warner Bros.
28	Classic Country: Great Story Songs	Various Artists	Time Life
19	Cledus Envy	Cledus T. Judd	Monument
39	Cledus Navidad	Cledus T. Judd	Monument
37	The Color of Roses	Lorrie Morgan	Image
13	Country Croonin'	Anne Murray	StraightWay
46	The Dark	Guy Clark	Sugar Hill
21	Down the Old Plank Road: The Nashville Sessions	The Chieftains	RCA
29	Easy	Kelly Willis	Rykodisc
34	Electric	Jack Ingram	Columbia
13	Emerson Drive	Emerson Drive	DreamWorks Nashville
16	The Essential Johnny Cash	Johnny Cash	Legacy
35	The Family Album	Roy D. Mercer	Capitol Nashville
18	Forever Country	Various Artists	Razor & Tie
16	Greatest Hits	Mark Wills	Mercury Nashville
49	The Heart of a Legend	Johnny Cash	Madacy
39	A Hillbilly Tribute to Mountain Love	Hayseed Dixie	Dualtone
40	How Sweet the Sound: 25 Favorite Hymns and Gospel Greats	Charlie Daniels	Sparrow
26	If That Ain't Country	Anthony Smith	Mercury Nashville
48	Inside Traxx 2002	Various Artists	Curb
12	It Won't Be Christmas Without You	Brooks & Dunn	Arista Nashville
39	Johnny Cash at Madison Square Garden	Johnny Cash	Legacy
18	A Joyful Noise	Jo Dee Messina	Curb
14	Kevin Denney	Kevin Denney	Lyric Street
17	Kindred Spirits: A Tribute to the Songs of Johnny Cash	Various Artists	Columbia
11	Life Happened	Tammy Cochran	Epic
40	Little Big Town	Little Big Town	Monument
27	Love Songs	John Michael Montgomery	Warner Bros.
17	Lovesick, Broke and Driftin'	Hank Williams III	Curb
48	The Lovin' Side	Travis Tritt	Rhino
23	Mark Chesnutt	Mark Chesnutt	Columbia
50	Midnight and Lonesome	Buddy Miller	Hightone
29	Mindy McCready	Mindy McCready	Capitol Nashville
35	Miss Fortune	Allison Moorer	Universal South
19	Now Again	The Flatlanders	New West
13	On a Mission	Trick Pony	Warner Bros.
29	Osama-Yo' Mama, The Album	Ray Stevens	Curb
28	Outside the Lines	Cory Morrow	Write On
17	Pinmonkey	Pinmonkey	BNA
13	Pictures	John Michael Montgomery	Warner Bros.
22	Ralph Stanley	Ralph Stanley	Columbia
40	Redneck Fiddlin' Man	Charlie Daniels	Blue Hat
36	Ricky Skaggs and Friends Sing the Songs of Bill Monroe	Ricky Skaggs	Lyric Street
12	Room to Breathe	Delbert McClinton	New West
38	Roses	Kathy Mattea	Narada
19	The Season for Romance	Lee Ann Womack	MCA Nashville
38	Sixwire	Sixwire	Warner Bros.
37	Spirit Dancer	BlackHawk	Columbia
18	Stars & Guitars	Willie Nelson	Lost Highway
39	Tanya	Tanya Tucker	Tuckertime
32	This Is Ty Herndon: Greatest Hits	Ty Herndon	Epic
27	Time-Life's Treasury of Bluegrass	Various Artists	Time Life
21	Today, Tomorrow & Forever	Elvis Presley	RCA
32	The Ultimate Collection	Hank Williams	Mercury Nashville
23	Up! (Country Mixes)	Shania Twain	Mercury Nashville
19	The Very Best of Linda Ronstadt	Linda Ronstadt	Elektra
29	Waitin' on Joe	Steve Azar	Mercury Nashville
14	We Were Soldiers Soundtrack	Various Artists	Columbia
42	White Trash Christmas	Bob Rivers	Atlantic
18	Will The Circle Be Unbroken, Volume III	Nitty Gritty Dirt Band	Capitol Nashville
34	Wings of a Honky-Tonk Angel	Brad Martin	Epic
45	Winter Marquee	Nanci Griffith	Rounder

== Births ==
- August 13 – Stella Lefty, singer-songwriter of the 2020s ("Boston").

== Deaths ==
- February 13 – Waylon Jennings, 64, singer and guitarist (diabetic complications)
- March 3 – Harlan Howard, 74, songwriter
- May 26 – Orville Couch, 67, singer-songwriter (acute lymphoblastic leukemia)

== Hall of Fame inductees ==
=== Bluegrass Music Hall of Fame inductees ===
- The Lilly Brothers & Don Stover
- David Freeman

=== Country Music Hall of Fame inductees ===
- Bill Carlisle (1908–2003)
- Porter Wagoner (1927–2007)

=== Canadian Country Music Hall of Fame inductees ===
- Anne Murray
- Art Snider
- Bev Munro
- D'Arcy Scott
- Elmer Tippe

== Major awards ==
=== ARIA Awards ===
- Best Country Album – Barricades & Brickwalls (Kasey Chambers)
- ARIA Hall of Fame – Olivia Newton-John

=== Grammy Awards ===
- Best Female Country Vocal Performance – "Cry" (Faith Hill)
- Best Male Country Vocal Performance – "Give My Love to Rose" (Johnny Cash)
- Best Country Performance by a Duo or Group with Vocal – "Long Time Gone" (Dixie Chicks)
- Best Country Collaboration with Vocals – "Mendocino County Line" (Willie Nelson featuring Lee Ann Womack)
- Best Country Instrumental Performance – "Lil' Jack Slade" (Dixie Chicks)
- Best Country Song – "Where Were You (When the World Stopped Turning)" (Alan Jackson)
- Best Country Album – Home (Dixie Chicks)
- Best Bluegrass Album – Lost in the Lonesome Pines (Jim Lauderdale, Ralph Stanley & the Clinch Mountain Boys)

=== Juno Awards ===
- Country Recording of the Year – "I'm Gonna Getcha Good!", Shania Twain

=== CMT Flameworthy Video Music Awards ===
- Video of the Year – "Young", Kenny Chesney
- Male Video of the Year – "Young", Kenny Chesney
- Female Video of the Year – "Blessed", Martina McBride
- Group / Duo Video of the Year – "Only in America", Brooks & Dunn
- Breakthrough Video of the Year – "I Breathe In, I Breathe Out", Chris Cagle
- Video Collaboration of the Year – "Mendocino County Line", Willie Nelson Featuring Lee Ann Womack
- Hottest Video of the Year – "The Cowboy in Me", Tim McGraw
- Concept Video of the Year – "I'm Gonna Miss Her (The Fishin' Song)", Brad Paisley
- Fashion Plate Video of the Year – "Jezebel", Chely Wright
- "LOL" (Laugh Out Loud) Video of the Year – "I Wanna Talk About Me", Toby Keith
- Love Your Country Video of the Year – "Where Were You (When the World Stopped Turning)", Alan Jackson
- Video Director of the Year – "I Wanna Talk About Me", Toby Keith (Director: Michael Salomon)
- Video Visionary Award – Dixie Chicks

=== Americana Music Honors & Awards ===
- Album of the Year – Buddy & Julie Miller
- Artist of the Year – Jim Lauderdale
- Song of the Year – "She's Looking At Me" (Jim Lauderdale)
- Instrumentalist of the Year – Jerry Douglas
- Spirit of Americana/Free Speech Award – Johnny Cash
- Lifetime Achievement: Songwriting – Billie Joe Shaver
- Lifetime Achievement: Performance – Emmylou Harris
- Lifetime Achievement: Executive – T Bone Burnett

=== Academy of Country Music ===
- Entertainer of the Year – Toby Keith
- Song of the Year – "I'm Movin' On", Rascal Flatts
- Single of the Year – "The Good Stuff," Kenny Chesney
- Album of the Year – Drive, Alan Jackson
- Top Male Vocalist – Kenny Chesney
- Top Female Vocalist – Martina McBride
- Top Vocal Duo – Brooks & Dunn
- Top Vocal Group – Rascal Flatts
- Top New Male Vocalist – Joe Nichols
- Top New Female Vocalist – Kellie Coffey
- Top New Vocal Duo or Group – Emerson Drive
- Video of the Year – "Drive (For Daddy Gene)", Alan Jackson (Director: Steven Goldmann)
- Vocal Event of the Year – "Mendocino County Line", Willie Nelson and Lee Ann Womack

=== Canadian Country Music Association ===
- Fans' Choice Award – Terri Clark
- Male Artist of the Year – Paul Brandt
- Female Artist of the Year – Carolyn Dawn Johnson
- Group or Duo of the Year – Emerson Drive
- SOCAN Song of the Year – "Ten Million Teardrops", Jason McCoy, Tim Taylor
- Single of the Year – "I Don't Want You to Go", Carolyn Dawn Johnson
- Album of the Year – Small Towns and Big Dreams, Paul Brandt
- Top Selling Album – Scarecrow, Garth Brooks
- CMT Video of the Year – "I Don't Want You to Go", Carolyn Dawn Johnson
- Chevy Trucks Rising Star Award – Emerson Drive
- Roots Artist or Group of the Year – Jimmy Rankin

=== Country Music Association ===
- Entertainer of the Year – Alan Jackson
- Song of the Year – "Where Were You (When the World Stopped Turning)," Alan Jackson
- Single of the Year – "Where Were You (When the World Stopped Turning)," Alan Jackson
- Album of the Year – Drive, Alan Jackson
- Male Vocalist of the Year – Alan Jackson
- Female Vocalist of the Year – Martina McBride
- Vocal Duo of the Year – Brooks & Dunn
- Vocal Group of the Year – Dixie Chicks
- Musician of the Year – Jerry Douglas
- Horizon Award – Rascal Flatts
- Music Video of the Year – "I'm Gonna Miss Her (The Fishin' Song)," Brad Paisley (Director: Peter Zavadil)
- Vocal Event of the Year – "Mendocino County Line", Willie Nelson and Lee Ann Womack
- Musician of the Year – Jerry Douglas

== Other links ==
- Country Music Association
- Inductees of the Country Music Hall of Fame
