= That'd Be Alright =

Single by Alan Jackson

from the album Drive
- B-side: "It's Five O'Clock Somewhere"
- Released: December 9, 2002
- Recorded: 2001–2002
- Genre: Country
- Length: 3:41
- Label: Arista Nashville
- Songwriters: Tia Sillers; Tim Nichols; Mark D. Sanders
- Producer: Keith Stegall

Alan Jackson singles chronology
"Work in Progress" (2002)	"That'd Be Alright" (2002)	"It's Five O'Clock Somewhere" (2003)

"That'd Be Alright" is a song written by Tia Sillers, Tim Nichols and Mark D. Sanders, and recorded by American country music artist Alan Jackson. It was released in December 2002 as the fourth and final single from his album Drive. The song reached the Top 5 on the U.S. Billboard Hot Country Singles & Tracks chart, peaking at number 2.

== Music video ==
The music video was directed by Steven Goldmann. It premiered on CMT on December 13, 2002, when CMT named it a "Hot Shot". It begins with Jackson, Joe Galante (president of Sony BMG's Nashville division at the time, the parent company of Jackson's label) and cinematographer Gerry Aschlag portraying a film director who wants to work in the music video field. The three are in a conference room together with Aschlag discussing his ideas for a new video. Jackson is mostly unimpressed with Aschlag's ideas, but still humors Aschlag by pretending to like his ideas. Finally, Jackson sarcastically reveals Aschlag his own idea - "shoot this thing without me in it," and then, he leaves the room. Then the song starts out with Aschlag attempting to go on with the video shoot by auditioning look-a-likes of Jackson, and even going as far as secretly filming Jackson going about his daily business, and shows the band playing in the barn. One of the look-a-likes of Alan Jackson was radio DJ Gunner from WIVK-FM in Knoxville, TN and another was former professional wrestle Bob Holly. A still image from the "Mercury Blues" video is seen by mouth movements. Another still image from the "It's Alright to Be a Redneck" video is used by mouth movements. Stock footage from "Chattahoochee", "Summertime Blues", "Don't Rock the Jukebox", and "I'll Go On Loving You" are used by mouth movements. The video ends with Aschlag daydreaming that the finished project had just won a CMA award. A clip from the 36th edition of the Country Music Association Awards in 2002 is seen near the end of the video, although neither the video nor the song was released before that particular award show. Scenes also included Jackson at a Sonic Drive In, dressed as a space cowboy, and Jackson walking with his wife in Franklin, TN.

== Chart performance ==
"That'd Be Alright" debuted at number 53 on the U.S. Billboard Hot Country Singles & Tracks for the week of December 14, 2002.

Chart (2002–2003)	Peak position
US Hot Country Songs (Billboard)	2
US Billboard Hot 100	29

=== Year-end charts ===
Chart (2003)	Position
US Country Songs (Billboard)	22
