= When Somebody Loves You =

When Somebody Loves You may refer to:

- When Somebody Loves You (album), by Alan Jackson
  - "When Somebody Loves You" (Alan Jackson song), its title track
- "When Somebody Loves You" (Restless Heart song)
