= 2001 Country Music Association Awards =

Annual US music awards ceremony

- Date: November 7, 2001
- Location: Grand Ole Opry House, Nashville, Tennessee
- Hosted by: Vince Gill
- Most wins: n/a
- Most nominations: Sara Evans (5)

Television/radio coverage
- Network: CBS

The 2001 Country Music Association Awards, 35th Ceremony, was held on November 7, 2001, at the Grand Ole Opry House in Nashville, Tennessee, and was hosted by CMA Award winner Vince Gill.

Sara Evans led the night with five nominations, including Female Vocalist of the Year and Album of the Year.

== Winners and nominees ==
Entertainer of the Year	Album of the Year
Tim McGraw; Brooks & Dunn; Dixie Chicks; Alan Jackson; George Strait	O Brother, Where Art Thou? — Various Artists; Born to Fly — Sara Evans; Set This Circus Down — Tim McGraw; Steers & Stripes — Brooks & Dunn; When Somebody Loves You — Alan Jackson
Male Vocalist of the Year	Female Vocalist of the Year
Toby Keith; Alan Jackson; Tim McGraw; Brad Paisley; George Strait	Lee Ann Womack; Sara Evans; Faith Hill; Martina McBride; Trisha Yearwood
Vocal Group of the Year	Vocal Duo of the Year
Lonestar; Alabama; Diamond Rio; Dixie Chicks; Nickel Creek	Brooks & Dunn; Bellamy Brothers; Montgomery Gentry; The Kinleys; The Warren Brothers
Single of the Year	Song of the Year
"I Am a Man of Constant Sorrow" — The Soggy Bottom Boys; "Ain't Nothing 'Bout You" — Brooks & Dunn; "I'm Already There" — Lonestar; "One More Day" — Diamond Rio; "Born to Fly" — Sara Evans	"Murder On Music Row" — Larry Cordle, Larry Shell; "Born to Fly" — Sara Evans, Marcus Hummon, Darryl Scott; "How Do You Like Me Now?!" — Chuck Cannon, Toby Keith; "I'm Already There" — Richie McDonald, Gary Baker, Frank Myers; "One More Day" — Steven Dale Jones, Bobby Tomberlin
Horizon Award	Musician of the Year
Keith Urban; Jessica Andrews; Nickel Creek; Jamie O'Neal; Phil Vassar	Dann Huff; Stuart Duncan; Paul Franklin; John Hobbs; Brent Mason
Music Video of the Year	Music Event of the Year
"Born to Fly" — Sara Evans; "Ashes By Now" — Lee Ann Womack; "I Would've Loved You Anyway" — Trisha Yearwood; "There Is No Arizona" — Jamie O'Neal; "www.memory" — Alan Jackson	"Too Country" — Brad Paisley (feat. George Jones, Bill Anderson, Buck Owens); "Alright, I'm Wrong" — Dwight Yoakam with Buck Owens; "Didn't Leave Nobody But the Baby" — Emmylou Harris, Alison Krauss, Gillian Welch; "Hard to Be a Husband, Hard to Be a Wife" — Brad Paisley, Chely Wright; "I'll Fly Away" — Alison Krauss, Gillian Welch
