= 2002 Country Music Association Awards =

Annual US music awards ceremony

- Date: November 6, 2002
- Location: Grand Ole Opry House, Nashville, Tennessee
- Hosted by: Vince Gill

Highlights
- Most wins: Alan Jackson (5)
- Most nominations: Alan Jackson (10)

Television/radio coverage
- Network: CBS

The 2002 Country Music Association Awards, 36th Ceremony, was held on November 6, 2002 at the Grand Ole Opry House, Nashville, Tennessee, and hosted by CMA Award Winner, Vince Gill. Alan Jackson lead the night with 10 nominations, including Album of the Year, and Entertainer of the Year.

== Winners and nominees ==
Entertainer of the Year	Album of the Year
Alan Jackson; Brooks & Dunn; Kenny Chesney; Toby Keith; George Strait	Drive — Alan Jackson; New Favorite — Alison Krauss and Union Station; No Shoes, No Shirt, No Problems — Kenny Chesney; Pull My Chain — Toby Keith; The Great Divide — Willie Nelson; The Road Less Traveled — George Strait
Male Vocalist of the Year	Female Vocalist of the Year
Alan Jackson; Kenny Chesney; Toby Keith; Brad Paisley; George Strait	Martina McBride; Sara Evans; Alison Krauss; Lee Ann Womack; Trisha Yearwood
Vocal Group of the Year	Vocal Duo of the Year
Dixie Chicks; Diamond Rio; Lonestar; Nickel Creek; Rascal Flatts	Brooks & Dunn; Bellamy Brothers; Montgomery Gentry; Sons of the Desert; The Warren Brothers
Single of the Year	Song of the Year
”Where Were You (When The World Stopped Turning)” — Alan Jackson; “Blessed” — Martina McBride; ”Courtesy Of The Red, White & Blue (The Angry American)” — Toby Keith; ”Drive (For Daddy Gene)” — Alan Jackson; ”I’m Gonna Miss Her (The Fishin’ Song)” — Brad Paisley	”Where Were You (When The World Stopped Turning)” - Alan Jackson; “Blessed” — Martina McBride; ”Courtesy Of The Red, White & Blue (The Angry American)” — Toby Keith; ”Drive (For Daddy Gene)” — Alan Jackson; ”I’m Gonna Miss Her (The Fishin’ Song)” — Brad Paisley; ”I Am a Man of Constant Sorrow”— Carter Stanley
Horizon Award	Musician of the Year
Rascal Flatts; Carolyn Dawn Johnson; Nickel Creek; Phil Vassar; Darryl Worley	Jerry Douglas — dobro; Glen Duncan — fiddle; Paul Franklin — steel guitar; Dann Huff — guitar; Brent Mason — guitar
Music Video of the Year	Music Event of the Year
”I’m Gonna Miss Her (The Fishin’ Song)” — Brad Paisley; “Drive (For Daddy Gene)” — Alan Jackson; ”I Wanna Talk About Me” — Toby Keith; ”Modern Day Bonnie and Clyde” — Travis Tritt; ”Where Were You (When The World Stopped Turning)” — Alan Jackson	“Mendocino County Line” — Willie Nelson with Lee Ann Womack; “Beer Run (B-double E-double Are You In?)" — Garth Brooks with George Jones; “Bring On The Rain” — Jo Dee Messina with Tim McGraw; “Designated Drinker” — Alan Jackson with George Strait; “I’ll Fly Away” (live) — Alison Krauss and Gillian Welch
