= Country Music Association Awards =

American music awards

- Current: 60th Annual Country Music Association Awards
- Awarded for: Achievements in country music
- Country: United States
- Presented by: Country Music Association
- First award: 1967; 59 years ago
- Website: www.cmaawards.com

Television/radio coverage
- Network: NBC (1968–1971); CBS (1972–2005); ABC (2006–present); Disney + (2026–present)

The Country Music Association Awards, also known as the CMA Awards or CMAs, are presented to country music artists and broadcasters to recognize outstanding achievement in the country music industry. The televised annual presentation ceremony features performances and award presentations by popular country music artists, with occasional appearances from pop and rock artists. The CMA Awards were first presented in 1967, and televised for the first time the following year.

== History ==
The first CMA awards were presented at an untelevised ceremony at the Nashville Municipal Auditorium on October 20, 1967; the Entertainer of the Year award went to Eddy Arnold that night. The second annual CMA awards were presented in October 1968; NBC taped the ceremony and televised it a few weeks later. Since then, the awards have been televised live, usually in October or November, by NBC from 1969 through 1971, by CBS from 1972 through 2005, and by ABC beginning in 2006. Starting in 1968 they were held at Nashville's Grand Ole Opry (initially at Ryman Auditorium, and from 1974 through 2004 at the new Grand Ole Opry House). In 2005, the awards show was held at Madison Square Garden in New York City.

Since 2006, they have been held at Nashville's Bridgestone Arena.In 2020, due to audience precautions from the COVID-19 pandemic, the 54th CMA Awards were held at Nashville's Music City Center.

Since 2024, the ceremony has been held on the third Wednesday of November. From 2017 to 2023, it was held on the second Wednesday of November. Prior to 2017, the awards were generally held on the first Wednesday of November. The awards have been rescheduled for later in the month to avoid conflict with a possible game seven of Major League Baseball's World Series.

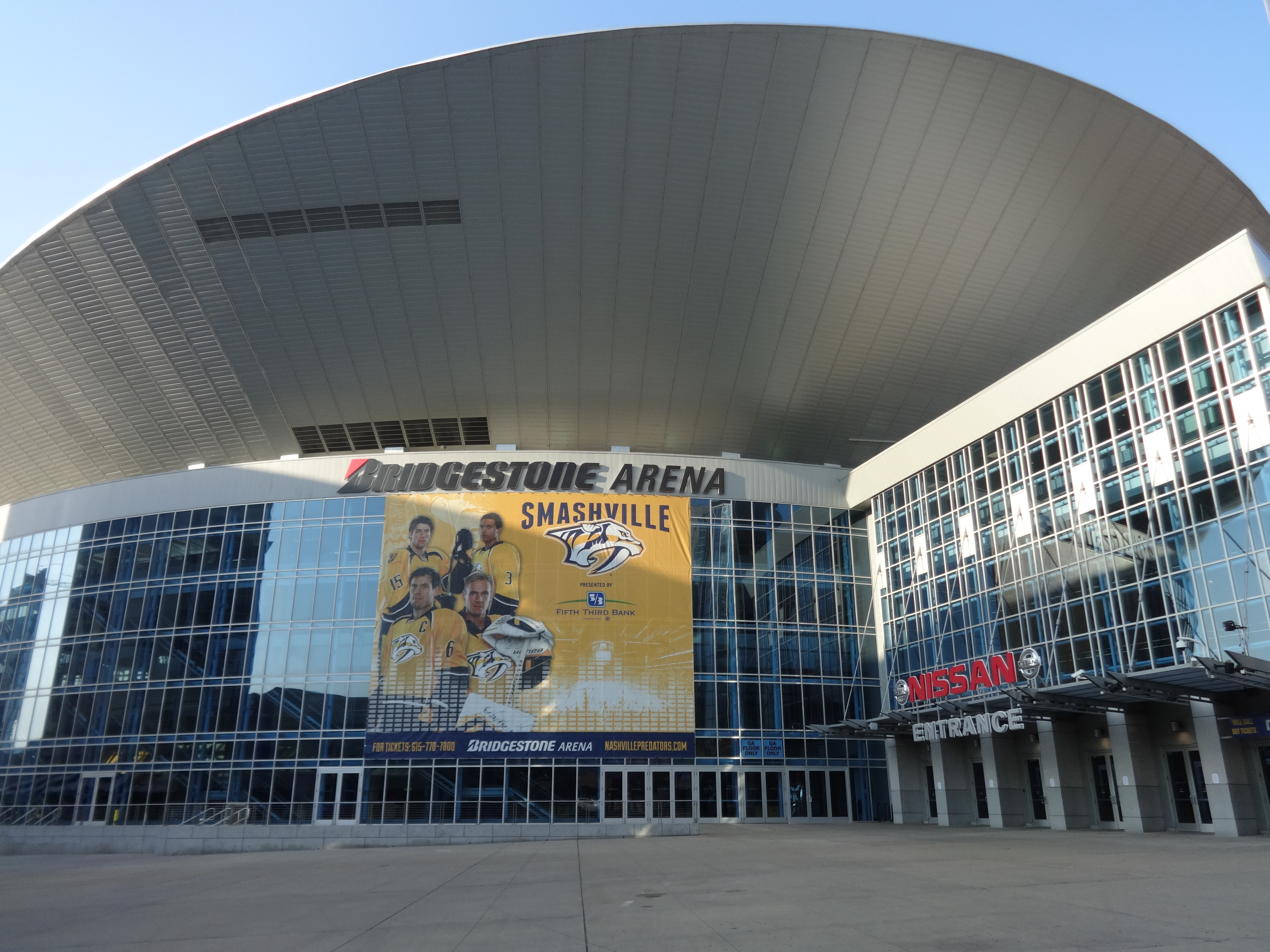
Exterior of the Bridgestone Arena.

In May 2026, the Country Music Association announced that they would extend its broadcast contract with ABC and Disney through 2032. They also announced, for the first time, the ceremony would be simulcast live from ABC and Disney+.

== Eligibility and voting ==
Albums and songs released between July 1 of the previous calendar year and June 30 of the award show's year are eligible for consideration.6,678 individuals from the Country Music Association professional members vote for the nominees and winners through three rounds of balloting.

== Awards ==
Annual awards are given in the following twelve categories: Entertainer, Male Vocalist, Female Vocalist, New Artist (previously known as the Horizon Award until 2008), Vocal Group, Vocal Duo (introduced in 1970), Single, Album, Song, Musical Event (split off from the Vocal Duo award in 1988 as Vocal Event), Music Video (introduced in 1985), and Musician. The distinction between the Duo and Event awards is that the former is presented to two artists who normally perform together, while the latter was specifically created to honor one-off collaborations. Nine awards are also given to radio broadcasters for Station of the Year and Personality of the Year (divided into four categories each, based on market size), as well as National Personality of the Year to the host of a nationally syndicated show. Since 2012, the ceremony features a Lifetime Achievement Award. Vince Gill, and Alan Jackson are the only individuals to win Entertainer of the Year, Male/Female Vocalist of the Year or Group/Duo of the Year, Album of the Year, and Song of the Year all in the same year.

=== Categories ===
- Entertainer of the Year
- Male Vocalist of the Year
- Female Vocalist of the Year
- Vocal Group of the Year
- Vocal Duo of the Year
- New Artist of the Year
- Musician of the Year
- Album of the Year
- Single of the Year
- Song of the Year
- Musical Event of the Year
- Video of the Year
- International Achievement Award

Defunct categories

- Comedian of the Year (1967–1970)
- Instrumental Group of the Year (1967–1986)

Industry Honors

- Award of Excellence
- Humanitarian Award
- J. William Denny Award
- Joe Talbot Award
- Lifetime Achievement Award
- Media Achievement Award
- Pinnacle Award
- President's Award
- Songwriter Advocate Award

Radio awards

- National Personality of the Year
- Major Market Personality of the Year
- Large Market Personality of the Year
- Medium Market Personality of the Year
- Small Market Personality of the Year
- Major Market Station of the Year
- Large Market Station of the Year
- Medium Market Station of the Year
- Small Market Station of the Year

=== Major awards ===
Year	Entertainer of the Year	Male Vocalist of the Year	Female Vocalist of the Year	Album of the Year	Song of the Year	New Artist of the Year (Horizon Award)
2026	Ella Langley	Chris Stapleton	Ella Langley	Dandelion	Ella Langley, Luke Dick, Miranda Lambert, Joybeth Taylor – “Choosin’ Texas”	Stephen Wilson Jr.
2025	Lainey Wilson	Cody Johnson	Lainey Wilson	Whirlwind	Ella Langley, Riley Green, Aaron Raitiere – "You Look Like You Love Me"	Zach Top
2024	Morgan Wallen	Chris Stapleton	Lainey Wilson	Leather	Chris Stapleton, Dan Wilson – "White Horse"	Megan Moroney
2023	Lainey Wilson	Chris Stapleton	Lainey Wilson	Bell Bottom Country	Tracy Chapman – "Fast Car"	Jelly Roll
2022	Luke Combs	Chris Stapleton	Lainey Wilson	Growin' Up	Jacob Davis, Jordan Davis, Josh Jenkins, Matt Jenkins – "Buy Dirt"	Lainey Wilson
2021	Luke Combs	Chris Stapleton	Carly Pearce	Starting Over	Mike Henderson and Chris Stapleton – "Starting Over"	Jimmie Allen
2020	Eric Church	Luke Combs	Maren Morris	What You See Is What You Get	Maren Morris, Jimmy Robbins, and Laura Veltz – "The Bones"	Morgan Wallen
2019	Garth Brooks	Luke Combs	Kacey Musgraves	Girl	Luke Combs, Wyatt B. Durrette III, Robert Williford - "Beautiful Crazy"	Ashley McBryde
2018	Keith Urban	Chris Stapleton	Carrie Underwood	Golden Hour	Chris Stapleton and Mike Henderson – "Broken Halos"	Luke Combs
2017	Garth Brooks	Chris Stapleton	Miranda Lambert	From A Room: Volume 1	Taylor Swift – "Better Man"	Jon Pardi
2016	Garth Brooks	Chris Stapleton	Carrie Underwood	Mr. Misunderstood	Lori McKenna – "Humble and Kind"	Maren Morris
2015	Luke Bryan	Chris Stapleton	Miranda Lambert	Traveller	Liz Rose, Lori McKenna and Hillary Lindsey – "Girl Crush"	Chris Stapleton
2014	Luke Bryan	Blake Shelton	Miranda Lambert	Platinum	Kacey Musgraves, Shane McAnally, Brandy Clark – "Follow Your Arrow"	Brett Eldredge
2013	George Strait	Blake Shelton	Miranda Lambert	Based on a True Story...	Jessi Alexander, Connie Harrington, Jimmy Yeary – "I Drive Your Truck"	Kacey Musgraves
2012	Blake Shelton	Blake Shelton	Miranda Lambert	Chief	Miranda Lambert, Blake Shelton – "Over You"	Hunter Hayes
2011	Taylor Swift	Blake Shelton	Miranda Lambert	My Kinda Party	Kimberly Perry – "If I Die Young"	The Band Perry
2010	Brad Paisley	Blake Shelton	Miranda Lambert	Revolution	Tom Douglas, Allen Shamblin – "The House That Built Me"	Zac Brown Band
2009	Taylor Swift	Brad Paisley	Taylor Swift	Fearless	Jamey Johnson, Lee Thomas Miller, James Otto – "In Color"	Darius Rucker
2008	Kenny Chesney	Brad Paisley	Carrie Underwood	Troubadour	Jennifer Nettles – "Stay"	Lady Antebellum
2007	Kenny Chesney	Brad Paisley	Carrie Underwood	It Just Comes Natural	Bill Anderson, Jamey Johnson, Buddy Cannon – "Give It Away"	Taylor Swift
2006	Kenny Chesney	Keith Urban	Carrie Underwood	Time Well Wasted	Craig Wiseman, Ronnie Dunn – "Believe"	Carrie Underwood
2005	Keith Urban	Keith Urban	Gretchen Wilson	There's More Where That Came From	Bill Anderson, Jon Randall – "Whiskey Lullaby"	Dierks Bentley
2004	Kenny Chesney	Keith Urban	Martina McBride	When the Sun Goes Down	Craig Wiseman, Tim Nichols – "Live Like You Were Dying"	Gretchen Wilson
2003	Alan Jackson	Alan Jackson	Martina McBride	The Man Comes Around	Doug Johnson, Kim Williams – "Three Wooden Crosses"	Joe Nichols
2002	Alan Jackson	Alan Jackson	Martina McBride	Drive	Alan Jackson – "Where Were You (When the World Stopped Turning)"	Rascal Flatts
2001	Tim McGraw	Toby Keith	Lee Ann Womack	O Brother, Where Art Thou?	Larry Cordle, Larry Shell – "Murder on Music Row"	Keith Urban
2000	Dixie Chicks	Tim McGraw	Faith Hill	Fly	Mark D. Sanders, Tia Sillers – "I Hope You Dance"	Brad Paisley
1999	Shania Twain	Tim McGraw	Martina McBride	A Place in the Sun	Beth Neilsen Chapman, Annie Roboff, Rob Lerner – "This Kiss"	Jo Dee Messina
1998	Garth Brooks	George Strait	Trisha Yearwood	Everywhere	Steve Wariner, Billy Kirsch – "Holes in the Floor of Heaven"	Dixie Chicks
1997	Garth Brooks	George Strait	Trisha Yearwood	Carrying Your Love with Me	Matraca Berg, Gary Harrison – "Strawberry Wine"	LeAnn Rimes
1996	Brooks & Dunn	George Strait	Patty Loveless	Blue Clear Sky	Vince Gill – "Go Rest High on That Mountain"	Bryan White
1995	Alan Jackson	Vince Gill	Alison Krauss	When Fallen Angels Fly	Gretchen Peters – "Independence Day"	Alison Krauss
1994	Vince Gill	Vince Gill	Pam Tillis	Common Thread	Alan Jackson, Jim McBride – "Chattahoochee"	John Michael Montgomery
1993	Vince Gill	Vince Gill	Mary Chapin Carpenter	I Still Believe in You	John Barlow Jarvis, Vince Gill – "I Still Believe in You"	Mark Chesnutt
1992	Garth Brooks	Vince Gill	Mary Chapin Carpenter	Ropin' the Wind	Max D. Barnes, Vince Gill – "Look at Us"	Suzy Bogguss
1991	Garth Brooks	Vince Gill	Tanya Tucker	No Fences	Tim DuBois, Vince Gill – "When I Call Your Name"	Travis Tritt
1990	George Strait	Clint Black	Kathy Mattea	Pickin' on Nashville	Don Henry, Jon Vezner – "Where've You Been"	Garth Brooks
1989	George Strait	Ricky Van Shelton	Kathy Mattea	Will the Circle Be Unbroken: Volume II	Max D. Barnes, Vern Gosdin – "Chiseled in Stone"	Clint Black
1988	Hank Williams, Jr.	Randy Travis	K. T. Oslin	Born to Boogie	K. T. Oslin – "80's Ladies"	Ricky Van Shelton
1987	Hank Williams, Jr.	Randy Travis	Reba McEntire	Always & Forever	Paul Overstreet, Don Schlitz – "Forever and Ever, Amen"	Holly Dunn
1986	Reba McEntire	George Strait	Reba McEntire	Lost in the Fifties Tonight	Paul Overstreet, Don Schlitz – "On the Other Hand"	Randy Travis
1985	Ricky Skaggs	George Strait	Reba McEntire	Does Fort Worth Ever Cross Your Mind	Lee Greenwood – "God Bless the USA"	Sawyer Brown
1984	Alabama	Lee Greenwood	Reba McEntire	A Little Good News	Larry Henley, Jeff Silbar – "Wind Beneath My Wings"	The Judds
1983	Alabama	Lee Greenwood	Janie Fricke	The Closer You Get...	Wayne Carson Thompson, Johnny Christopher, Mark James – "Always on My Mind"	John Anderson
1982	Alabama	Ricky Skaggs	Janie Fricke	Always on My Mind	Wayne Carson Thompson, Johnny Christopher, Mark James – "Always on My Mind"	Ricky Skaggs
1981	Barbara Mandrell	George Jones	Barbara Mandrell	I Believe in You	Bobby Braddock, Curly Putman – "He Stopped Loving Her Today"	Terri Gibbs
1980	Barbara Mandrell	George Jones	Emmylou Harris	Coal Miner's Daughter Soundtrack	Bobby Braddock, Curly Putman – "He Stopped Loving Her Today"	No award presented
1979	Willie Nelson	Kenny Rogers	Barbara Mandrell	The Gambler	Don Schlitz – "The Gambler"	No award presented
1978	Dolly Parton	Don Williams	Crystal Gayle	It Was Almost Like a Song	Richard Leigh – "Don't It Make My Brown Eyes Blue"	No award presented
1977	Ronnie Milsap	Ronnie Milsap	Crystal Gayle	Ronnie Milsap: Live	Roger Bowling, Hal Bynum – "Lucille"	No award presented
1976	Mel Tillis	Ronnie Milsap	Dolly Parton	Wanted! The Outlaws	Larry Weiss – "Rhinestone Cowboy"	No award presented
1975	John Denver	Waylon Jennings	Dolly Parton	A Legend in My Time	John Denver – "Back Home Again"	No award presented
1974	Charlie Rich	Ronnie Milsap	Olivia Newton-John	A Very Special Love Song	Don Wayne – "Country Bumpkin"	No award presented
1973	Roy Clark	Charlie Rich	Loretta Lynn	Behind Closed Doors	Kenny O'Dell – "Behind Closed Doors"	No award presented
1972	Loretta Lynn	Charley Pride	Loretta Lynn	Let Me Tell You About a Song	Freddie Hart – "Easy Loving"	No award presented
1971	Charley Pride	Charley Pride	Lynn Anderson	I Won't Mention It Again	Freddie Hart – "Easy Loving"	No award presented
1970	Merle Haggard	Merle Haggard	Tammy Wynette	Okie from Muskogee	Kris Kristofferson – "Sunday Mornin' Comin' Down"	No award presented
1969	Johnny Cash	Johnny Cash	Tammy Wynette	Johnny Cash at San Quentin	Bob Ferguson – "The Carroll County Accident"	No award presented
1968	Glen Campbell	Glen Campbell	Tammy Wynette	Johnny Cash At Folsom Prison	Bobby Russell – "Honey"	No award presented
1967	Eddy Arnold	Jack Greene	Loretta Lynn	There Goes My Everything	Dallas Frazier – "There Goes My Everything"	No award presented

=== Country Music Association Award for International Achievement ===
The Country Music Association Award for International Achievement is presented to international artists and executives.

==== International Artist Achievement Award ====
Formerly presented as the International Touring Artist Award, this award recognizes outstanding achievement by a U.S.-based artist who has demonstrated the most significant creative growth, development and promotion of the country music industry outside of the United States during the eligibility period. The Dixie Chicks were the first artists to receive the award twice. 2008 is the only year in which there were multiple winners.

- 2026: Lainey Wilson
- 2025: Morgan Wallen
- 2024: Kip Moore
- 2023: Luke Combs
- 2022: Ashley McBryde
- 2021: Luke Combs
- 2020: Keith Urban
- 2019: Kacey Musgraves
- 2018: Little Big Town
- 2017: Carrie Underwood
- 2016: Kacey Musgraves
- 2015: Not presented
- 2014: Brad Paisley
- 2013: Taylor Swift
- 2012: Lady Antebellum
- 2011: Brad Paisley
- 2010: Not presented
- 2009: Taylor Swift
- 2008: Dierks Bentley and Brooks & Dunn
- 2007: Dwight Yoakam
- 2006: Dixie Chicks
- 2005: Keith Urban
- 2004: Dolly Parton
- 2003: Dixie Chicks
- 2002: Bellamy Brothers
- 2001: Lonestar
- 2000: Reba McEntire
- 1999: Shania Twain
- 1998: Trisha Yearwood
- 1997: The Mavericks
- 1996: BR5 49

==== Global Country Achievement Award ====
Named in honor of Jeff Walker, this award recognizes outstanding achievements by a country music artist signed outside of the United States. The artist must have furthered the popularity of country music as well as brought attention to the country music format in their territory. This award was first presented in 2003 and has been presented annually since, with the exception of 2015. The Global Country Achievement Award has been most frequently won by Australian artists.

- 2026: James Johnston (Australia)
- 2025: Cameron Whitcomb (Canada)
- 2024: Josh Ross (Canada)
- 2023: Kaylee Bell (New Zealand)
- 2022: Ilse DeLange (The Netherlands)
- 2021: The Shires (UK)
- 2020: Ilse DeLange (The Netherlands)
- 2019: Travis Collins (Australia) and Ward Thomas (UK)
- 2018: Dean Brody (Canada)
- 2017: The Shires (UK)
- 2016: Gord Bamford (Canada)
- 2015: Not presented
- 2014: Morgan Evans (Australia)
- 2013: Gord Bamford (Canada)
- 2012: Jasmine Rae (Australia)
- 2011: The McClymonts (Australia)
- 2010: Tommy Emmanuel (Australia)
- 2009: Catherine Britt (Australia)
- 2008: Troy Cassar-Daley (Australia)
- 2007: Adam Harvey (Australia)
- 2006: Jason McCoy (Canada)
- 2005: Paul Brandt (Canada)
- 2004: Kasey Chambers and Slim Dusty (Australia)
- 2003: Lee Kernaghan (Australia)

==== International Broadcaster of the Year ====
This award recognizes outstanding achievement by a radio broadcaster outside the United States who has made important contributions for the development of country music in their country. Up to three recipients may be named in any year. Each recipient must represent a different territory.

- 2026: Bob Harris (UK)
- 2025: Mattias Hansson (Sweden)
- 2024: Joakim Richardson (Sweden), Wimpie van der Sandt (South Africa), Justin Thomson (Australia)
- 2023: Ricky Ross (UK)
- 2022: Chris Stevens (UK)
- 2021: Baylen Leonard (UK)
- 2020: Ben Earle (UK)
- 2019: Baylen Leonard (UK)
- 2018: Chris Stevens (UK)
- 2017: Bob Harris (UK)
- 2016: Paul McGuire (Canada)
- 2015: Not presented
- 2014: Ricky Ross (UK)
- 2013: Bob Harris (UK)
- 2012: David Burton (Australia), Takehisa Matsuda (Japan) and Lee Williams (UK)
- 2011: Ken McLeod (Scotland), Felicity Urquhart (Australia) and Brian D'Arcy (Northern Ireland)
- 2010: Sandy Harsch (Ireland), Larry Cann (Australia) and Alan Watkiss (UK)
- 2009: Grant Goldman (Australia), Casey Clarke (Canada) and Brian Clough (UK)
- 2008: Pio McCann (Ireland), John Bond (Australia) and Joe Fish (UK)
- 2007: Nick Erby (Australia), Jackie-Rae Greening (Canada) and Georges Lang (France)
- 2006: Tim Rogers (UK), Ian Holland (Australia) and Helen Macpherson (Scotland)
- 2005: The Odd Squad (Canada), Ray Hadley (Australia) and Bryan Burnett (Scotland)
- 2004: Trevor Campbell (UK), Bob Harris (UK) and Nikos Garavelas (Greece)
- 2003: Pat Geary (Scotland), Johnnie Walker (UK) and John Laws (Australia)
- 2002: Stuart Cameron and David Allan (UK)
- 2001: Gary Beattie (Australia) and Bill Black (UK)
- 2000: Thomas Jeier (Germany), Korneliusz Pacuda (Poland), John Nutting (Australia) and Dick Barrie (Scotland)
- 1999: Trevor Smith (Australia), Dieter Vulpus and Bernd Schroeder (Germany), Country FM (The Netherlands)
- 1998: Ruud Hermans and Jan de Jong (The Netherlands), Lloyd Cole (Wales) and Kirsten Helm Petersen (Denmark)
- 1997: Walter Fuchs (Germany), Nick Erby and John Laws (Australia)

== CMA Awards hosts ==
Host	Times hosted/co-hosted
Vince Gill	12 (1992–2003)
Carrie Underwood	12 (2008–2019)
Brad Paisley	11 (2008–2018)
Reba McEntire	5 (1990–1992, 2019–2020)
Johnny Cash	5 (1973–1974, 1976–1978)
Kenny Rogers	4 (1979, 1984, 1987, 1989)
Luke Bryan	4 (2021–2024)
Tennessee Ernie Ford	3 (1969–1971)
Mac Davis	3 (1980–1982)
Barbara Mandrell	3 (1980–1982)
Anne Murray	3 (1983, 1985, 1989)
Brooks & Dunn	3 (2004–2006)
Peyton Manning	3 (2022–2024)
Lainey Wilson	3 (2024–2026)
Glen Campbell	2 (1972, 1975)
Willie Nelson	2 (1983, 1986)
Kris Kristofferson	2 (1985, 1986)
Dolly Parton	2 (1988, 2019)
Darius Rucker	1 (2020)
Randy Travis	1 (1990)
Roy Clark	1 (1976)
Charley Pride	1 (1975)
Dale Evans	1 (1968)
Roy Rogers	1 (1968)
Bobbie Gentry	1 (1967)
Sonny James	1 (1967)

== Award milestones ==
=== Most wins ===
Artist	Wins
Brooks & Dunn	20
Chris Stapleton	19
Vince Gill	18
Miranda Lambert	17
George Strait	17
Alan Jackson	16
Brad Paisley	14
Garth Brooks	14

Most wins, in single ceremony

- Ella Langley – 6 (2026)
- Johnny Cash – 5 (1969); Vince Gill – 5 (1993); Alan Jackson – 5 (2002); Lainey Wilson – 5 (2023)

=== Most nominated ===
Artist	Nominations
George Strait	83
Alan Jackson	81
Miranda Lambert	70
Brad Paisley	58
Brooks & Dunn	58
Vince Gill	54
Reba McEntire	51

Most nominations, in single ceremony

- Alan Jackson – 10 (2002)
- Miranda Lambert – 9 (2010); Miranda Lambert – 9 (2014); Lainey Wilson – 9 (2023); Ella Langley – 9 (2026)

==== Top five awards ====
Only two artists have won the top five awards (Entertainer, Album, Male Vocalist/Female Vocalist/Group/Duo, Single and Song of the Year) in a single ceremony: Alan Jackson (2002), Ella Langley (2026).

Ceremony	Entertainer	Album	Vocalist/Group/Duo	Single	Song
36th	Alan Jackson	Drive – Alan Jackson	Alan Jackson	"Where Were You (When the World Stopped Turning)" – Alan Jackson	"Where Were You (When the World Stopped Turning)" – Alan Jackson
60th	Ella Langley	Dandelion – Ella Langley	Ella Langley	“Choosin’ Texas” – Ella Langley	“Choosin’ Texas” – Ella Langley

== Controversies ==
=== Charlie Rich "lights up" John Denver ===
When presenting the Entertainer of the Year award at the 1975 ceremony, Charlie Rich, who appeared to be intoxicated after drinking backstage and was allegedly taking pain medication for a broken foot, opened the envelope to reveal the winner. When he saw that John Denver had been chosen, Rich pulled out his lighter and burned the envelope, sarcastically declaring that the winner was "my friend, Mr. John Denver". Many saw Rich's actions as a protest towards pop artists crossing over into country music and it remains one of the most discussed moments in CMA history.

=== Kathy Mattea's AIDS speech ===
During a time when the rest of the entertainment industry were wearing red ribbons to signify solidarity and promote awareness of the AIDS epidemic, in an attempt to steer clear of controversy, the CMA instead encouraged guests to wear green ribbons to signify environmental awareness. This did not sit well with Kathy Mattea, who had lost several friends to the disease, and she requested the CMA's help in drafting a short speech on the issue, but they ignored her request and she took matters into her own hands. At the 1992 ceremony while presenting an award, Mattea wore three red ribbons and one green ribbon and announced the names of her friends who had succumbed to AIDS and delivered an impassioned speech that created a discussion and elevated AIDS awareness among the Nashville community. Mattea went on to become a staunch advocate for the cause, releasing the album Red Hot + Country two years later to raise funds for AIDS charities.

=== Alan Jackson's 1999 performance ===
On May 8, 1999, George Jones released "Choices", a song written by Mike Curtis and Billy Yates, that featured an accompanying music video which depicted his struggles with substance abuse. The song subsequently became a Top 30 hit for Jones and was nominated for Single of the Year at the 1999 CMA Awards, with the CMA inviting him to perform a shortened version at the ceremony. Jones felt insulted that the CMA requested he remove part of the song and declined the invitation. Alan Jackson, who was slated to perform his current single "Pop a Top", was offended that the CMA had denied Jones the opportunity to sing the full song, and so during his performance, he stopped his own band mid-song and proceeded to sing the chorus of "Choices", which went on to earn a standing ovation from the audience.

=== Beyoncé 50th anniversary performance ===
At the 50th CMA Awards in 2016, Beyoncé, along with The Chicks, performed a medley of "Daddy Lessons" from her 2016 Lemonade album and The Chicks' 2002 hit "Long Time Gone". While many viewers and critics praised the performance, it garnered criticism from some country traditionalists, who stated that Beyoncé, a pop/R&B artist, had no place at a country music awards show. The comments polarized opinions, with some noting that they could be seen as a racist attack, as previous collaborations with non-country artists had not received the same amount of criticism and some suggesting that old grudges against the Chicks had fueled the extreme responses to their performance, after their first performance since their comments about George Bush resulted in them being blacklisted from the industry. Many artists including Dierks Bentley and Karen Fairchild defended the performance while others did not, including Alan Jackson who reportedly left the arena.

=== Morgan Wallen 55th anniversary ban ===
At the 55th CMA Awards in 2021, country singer Morgan Wallen was banned from the event, resulting in the disqualification of his submissions for his album Dangerous: The Double Album, due to a video in which Wallen uttered a racial slur and the ensuing controversy within the country music community, which included accusations of racism. Wallen replied the day after the ceremony stating "I wake up every morning and thank the Lord for my blessings. Tomorrow morning will be no different. I love y’all". Wallen was readmitted to the competition in 2022, facing citicism from the audience.

=== Accusations of bias against black artists ===
Over the years numerous publications, websites, and magazines on country music have accused the association of discriminating African-American country artists, and particularly black female artists in the selection of nominations and award winners. Through the years US nonprofit civil rights organization Color of Change president Rashad Robinson has accused the ceremony of not recognizing African American country musicians and the history of the genre. At the 58th CMA Awards, the nominating committee was accused of purposefully snubbing Beyoncé's eighth studio album, Cowboy Carter, as well as the lead single, "Texas Hold 'Em", even though it's not clear if any of her works were submitted to the nominating committee that year.

== See also ==
- Inductees of the Country Music Hall of Fame
- CMA Music Festival, a CMA-produced summer event which is part of the CMA broadcast contract with ABC
