= 1975 Country Music Association Awards =

Annual US music awards ceremony

- Date: October 13, 1975
- Location: Grand Ole Opry House, Nashville, Tennessee
- Hosted by: Glen Campbell; Charley Pride
- Most wins: John Denver (2)
- Most nominations: John Denver (5)

Television/radio coverage
- Network: CBS

The 1975 Country Music Association Awards, 9th Ceremony, was held on October 13, 1975, at the Grand Ole Opry House, Nashville, Tennessee, and was hosted by CMA Award winners Glen Campbell and Charley Pride.

== Winners and nominees ==
Winners in Bold.

Entertainer of the Year	Album of the Year
**John Denver**; Waylon Jennings; Loretta Lynn; Ronnie Milsap; Conway Twitty	**A Legend in My Time — Ronnie Milsap**; An Evening with John Denver — John Denver; Before the Next Teardrop Falls — Freddy Fender; Feelins' — Conway Twitty and Loretta Lynn; The Ramblin' Man — Waylon Jennings; Rhinestone Cowboy — Glen Campbell
Male Vocalist of the Year	Female Vocalist of the Year
**Waylon Jennings**; John Denver; Freddy Fender; Ronnie Milsap; Conway Twitty	**Dolly Parton**; Jessi Colter; Loretta Lynn; Linda Ronstadt; Tanya Tucker
Vocal Group of the Year	Vocal Duo of the Year
**Statler Brothers**; Asleep at the Wheel; Four Guys; The Osborne Brothers; Pointer Sisters	**Conway Twitty and Loretta Lynn**; Jack Greene and Jeannie Seely; George Jones and Tammy Wynette; Mel Tillis and Sherry Bryce; Porter Wagoner and Dolly Parton
Single of the Year	Song of the Year
**"Before the Next Teardrop Falls" — Freddy Fender**; "(Hey Won't You Play) Another Somebody Done Somebody Wrong Song" — B. J. Thomas; "I'm Not Lisa" — Jessi Colter; "Rhinestone Cowboy" — Glen Campbell; "Thank God I'm a Country Boy" — John Denver	**"Back Home Again" — John Denver**; "Before the Next Teardrop Falls" — Ben Peters, Vivian Keith; "(Hey Won't You Play) Another Somebody Done Somebody Wrong Song" — Chips Moman, Larry Butler; "I'm Not Lisa" — Jessi Colter; "Rainy Day Woman" — Waylon Jennings
Instrumental Group of the Year	Instrumentalist of the Year
**Roy Clark and Buck Trent**; Danny Davis and the Nashville Brass; The Earl Scruggs Revue; Po' Boys; Twitty Birds	**Johnny Gimble**; Chet Atkins; Roy Clark; Charlie McCoy; Jerry Reed

== Hall of Fame ==
Country Music Hall of Fame Inductees
- Minnie Pearl

== Performers ==
Artist(s)	Song(s)
Charley Pride	"Kiss an Angel Good Mornin'"
Freddy Fender	"Before the Next Teardrop Falls"
Dolly Parton	"Love Is Like a Butterfly"
Loretta Lynn	"Coal Miner's Daughter"
Glen Campbell	"Rhinestone Cowboy"
Conway Twitty; Joni Lee	"Don't Cry, Joni"
Mickey Gilley; Gary Stewart; Ronnie Milsap	Piano Players Medley "Bouquet of Roses" "She's Actin' Single (I'm Drinkin' Doubles)" "Daydreams About Night Things" "How I Love Them Old Songs"
Willie Nelson	"Blue Eyes Crying in the Rain"
Chet Atkins	Patriotic Medley "Yankee Doodle Dixie" "Battle Hymn of the Republic" "America the Beautiful"

== Presenters ==
Presenter(s)	Award
Mac Davis; Bobby Goldsboro	Female Vocalist of the Year
Anne Murray; Johnny Rodriguez	Vocal Duo of the Year
Pee Wee King; Freddie Hart	Vocal Group of the Year
Lynn Anderson; Mel Tillis	Album of the Year
Donna Fargo; George Jones	Song of the Year
Tammy Wynette; Tanya Tucker	Male Vocalist of the Year
Porter Wagoner; Mac Wiseman	Instrumental Group of the Year
Billy "Crash" Craddock; Minnie Pearl	Single of the Year
Bill Anderson; Bobby Bare	Instrumentalist of the Year
Tennessee Ernie Ford	Presented Country Music Hall of Fame Induction of Minnie Pearl
Charlie Rich	Entertainer of the Year
