= Ross Holmes =

American musician, composer, and producer (born 1984)

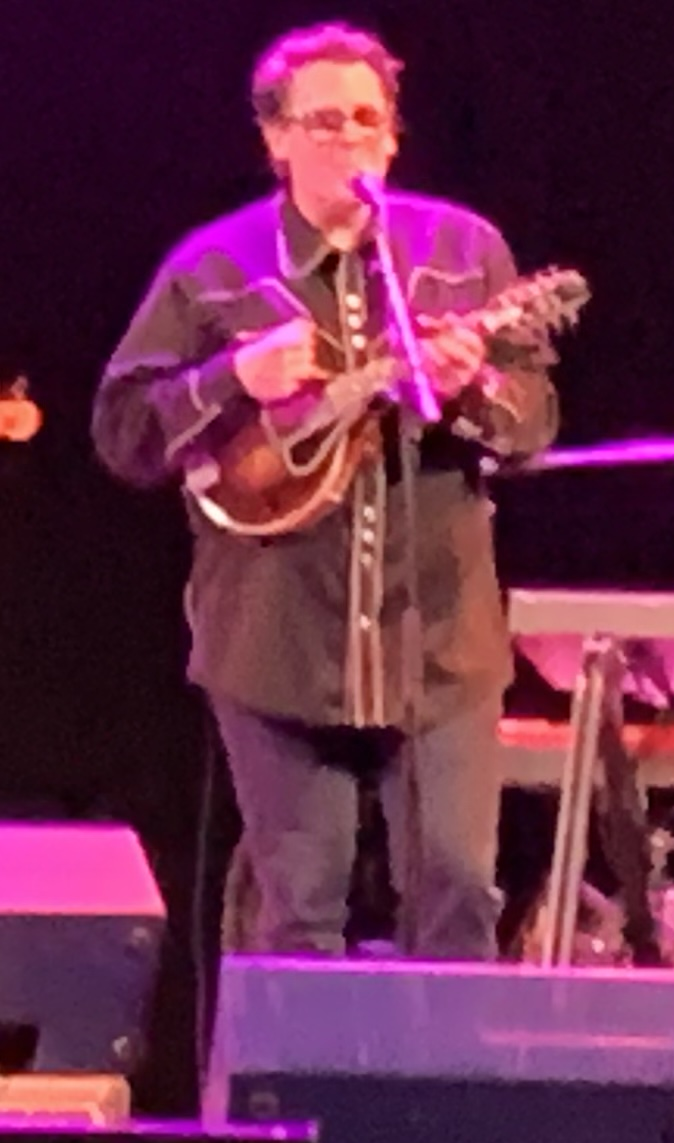
- Holmes with Nitty Gritty Dirt Band in 2024.

Background information
- Born: June 14, 1984 (age 42); Fort Worth, Texas
- Genres: Folk; bluegrass; classical; folk rock
- Occupations: Composer; record producer
- Instruments: Vocals; violin; mandolin
- Years active: 2002–present
- Member of: Nitty Gritty Dirt Band
- Formerly of: Cadillac Sky
- Website: http://rossholmes.net/

Elliott Ross Holmes (born June 14, 1984) is an American violinist, composer and producer known for his progressive style that is genre fluid, mixing old and new world styles. Since 2018, Holmes has been a member of the Nitty Gritty Dirt Band.

== Early life ==
Growing up in Fort Worth, Texas, Holmes was inspired by the Texas music scene and competitive fiddle playing. His Grandfather played the violin and that was Ross’s first introduction to the instrument. At the age of 8, his younger sister (Katie Shore from Asleep at the Wheel) started taking fiddle lessons and this quickly piqued Ross’s interest to learn the instrument for himself.

Holmes foundational training combined Texas contest fiddle and classical styles taught to him by his mentors, Texas fiddlers Jimmie Don Bates, Joey McKenzie and Dr. Kurt Sprenger of the Warsaw National Philharmonic Orchestra. At the age of 11, Holmes enrolled in the Mark O’Connor string camp which acted as a major catalyst for him to pursue a career in music. Additionally, his background and training as a member of the Texas Boys Choir was Holmes first exposure as a touring musician across the U.S.

== Music career ==
Holmes has worked with famous bands and artists such as Mumford & Sons, Nitty Gritty Dirt Band, Bruce Hornsby and the Noisemakers, Warren Haynes, Ryan Bingham, Bela Fleck, Abigail Washburn, and Keith & Kristyn Getty. He is a founding member of progressive Bluegrass group, Cadillac Sky.

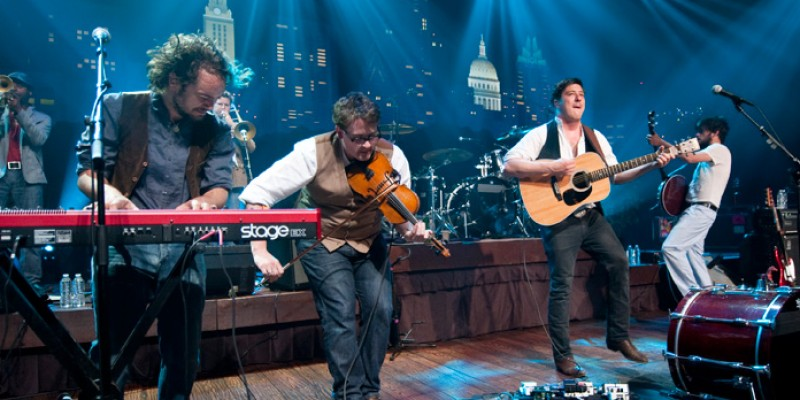
Mumford & Sons, Austin City Limits, 2011

=== Cadillac Sky ===
Cadillac Sky formed in 2002 when Holmes met founding members Bryan Simpson (vocals, mandolin), Matt Menefee (banjo) in Texas. The group’s early years reflected a more traditional bluegrass sound, which evolved to the progressive bluegrass style they were later acclaimed for.

The ensemble got a foothold touring regionally around the south. When their progress was interrupted in 2004, Holmes drove overnight to Nashville for an audition with fast-rising country traditionalist, Josh Turner. Holmes earned his first industry experience on the road with the baritone star.

Cadillac Sky became active again in 2006 with the group signing to the Skaggs Family label. They released their debut album, Blind Man Walking; which reached number two on the US Grass Billboard Charts. Later on in the winter of 2011 Cadillac Sky disbanded, declaring a hiatus.

=== Mumford and Sons ===
With Cadillac Sky on hiatus, Mumford & Sons invited Ross to be their fiddle player. He toured globally as the band evolved to one of the largest pop sensations, making headline appearances for 250,000 people at the Glastonbury Festival, Lollapalooza in Chicago, and Red Rocks Amphitheatre.

Holmes joined Railroad Revival Tour, a multi-day jaunt that Mumford & Sons, Edward Sharpe and the Magnetic Zeros and Old Crow Medicine Show traveled by a 14-car train from Oakland to New Orleans, playing six concerts along the way. A documentary called Big Easy Express developed out of this tour, directed by Emmett Malloy premiered at SXSW 2012 and won a Grammy Award in 2013.

Holmes became a deep contributor to Mumford & Sons where he acted as arranger for the string parts for the band’s anticipated second album Babel. The album went on to win the Grammy Award for Album of the Year in 2012 in which Holmes was recognized for his role by The Recording Academy.

=== ChessBoxer ===
In 2010, Holmes's musical explorations with Cadillac Sky banjo player Matt Menefee evolved into a duo project called ChessBoxer. The style reflected a movement to the Newgrass sound by combining genres of bluegrass, folk and rock. In 2013 Holmes and Menefee self-released their debut EP ChessBoxer. In 2014, double bassist Royal Masat became a member of ChessBoxer. In 2015, the trio self-released their second recorded work, Apollo EP, while supporting guitarist Warren Haynes on the international Ashes & Dust Tour.

=== Bruce Hornsby and the Noisemakers ===
In 2013 Holmes received a phone call from Bruce Hornsby who expressed interest in working with him. Holmes became a member of Hornsby’s touring band, the Noisemakers, and from 2014–2017 played fiddle and mandolin on tour and on Hornsby's latest studio release, Rehab Reunion. Holmes became indispensable to the new sound of the band but left in 2018 when he was invited to become a member of the Nitty Gritty Dirt Band.

=== Nitty Gritty Dirt Band ===
In Jan 2018, Holmes was invited to join the Nitty Gritty Dirt Band for several shows as a substitute after John McEuen's departure from the band in the fall of 2017. After establishing a rapport with the band, Holmes was invited to become a member of NGDB along with Jaime Hanna, son of Jeff Hanna.

=== Debut Release ===
On October 23, 2018, Holmes self-released his debut album, "Not Very Good at Winning," a collection of 12 Texas-style contest fiddle tunes recorded in 360° sound at Southern Ground Studios in Nashville, Tennessee. The album is the first solo unaccompanied recording of Texas-style contest fiddle tunes since Eck Robertson recorded in New York City June 30 and July 1, 1922.

== Discography ==
=== Cadillac Sky (Band member – Fiddle, Vocals, Writer, and Misc instruments) ===
| Year | Work | Record label |
|---|---|---|
| 2003 | Talent Show | Self Release |
| 2007 | Blind Man Walking | Skaggs Family Records |
| 2009 | Gravity's Our Enemy | Self Release |
| 2010 | Weary Angel EP | Self Release |
| 2010 | Letter's In The Deep | Dualtone Records |

=== Mumford & Sons (Touring member – Fiddle, Misc instruments, Arranger) ===
| Year | Work | Record label |
|---|---|---|
| 2012 | Big Easy Express | GathrFilms |
| 2012 | Babel | Glassnote Records |
| 2012 | The Road to Red Rocks | Glassnote Records |

=== Bruce Hornsby and the Noisemakers (Band member – Fiddle, Mandolin, Vocals) ===
| Year | Work | Record label |
|---|---|---|
| 2016 | Rehab Reunion | 429 Records |

=== ChessBoxer (Band member – Fiddle, Vocals, Writer, and Misc instruments) ===
| Year | Work | Record label |
|---|---|---|
| 2012 | ChessBoxer (Self Titled) | Self Release |
| 2015 | Apollo EP | Self Release |

=== Solo (Fiddle, Arranger, Producer) ===
| Year | Work | Record label |
|---|---|---|
| 2018 | Not Very Good At Winning | Ross Holmes |

=== Producer ===
| Year | Title | Artist |
|---|---|---|
| 2015 | Fall Away | Katie Shore |
| 2016 | Unarmored | Sam Burchfield |
| 2017 | Wooden | Ben Sparaco |

== See also ==
- Mumford & Sons
- Cadillac Sky
