= The Whistles & the Bells =

American experimental alt-rock band

- Origin: Nashville, Tennessee
- Genres: Alternative rock
- Years active: 2008—present
- Label: New West
- Members: Bryan Simpson
- Website: thewhistlesandthebells.com

The Whistles & the Bells is an American experimental alt-rock band based in Nashville, Tennessee, that serves as a moniker for singer-songwriter and producer Bryan Simpson. The band has released two full-length studio albums: The Whistles & the Bells in 2015 and Modern Plagues in 2017. Their music incorporates elements of rock, pop, folk, and electronic.

== Formation ==
Singer-songwriter Bryan Simpson began the Whistles & the Bells as a solo venture in 2008. For its original lineup, Simpson brought in Matt Menefee and Ross Holmes, members of his previous project, the progressive bluegrass band Cadillac Sky, with which he had released three albums.

== The Whistles & the Bells ==
Simpson self-released the band's eponymous debut album in 2014. It was recorded at Sputnik Sound by Grammy Award-winning engineer Vance Powell, together with Eddie Spear. All songs were written by Simpson except "Ghost Town" and "Ghetto Gold" (Simpson and Thad Cokrell), and "Last Night God Sang Me a Song" (Ben Kyle and Simpson). On August 7, 2015, the record was reissued globally by New West Records.

=== Personnel ===
- Bryan Simpson – vocals, acoustic and electric guitars, mandolin, fiddle
- Matthew Menefee – banjo, mandolin
- Melvin "Maestro" Lightford – organ, piano
- Byron House – piano and bass
- Adam Stockdale – electric guitar
- Keio Stroud, Chris Powell, Billy Brimblecom – drums
- "Fats" Kaplin – steel guitar
- Rob Ickes – guitar
- Kai Welch – trumpet
- Jim Hoke – saxophone
- Ross Holmes – violin
- Nat Smith – cello
- Jeff Taylor – accordion
- Eddie Spear – double gong
- Kristen Rogers, Thad Cockrell, Phoebe Deffenbaugh – backing vocals
- The Doberman Region, a.k.a. "Crisco and Boots", Edward Spear – additional vocals

The Stars in My Sky Choir:

- Kristi Simpson, Nathan Meredith, Matt and Brittany Jenkins, Brent Rupard, Nathan Belt, Doctor Proctor, Taylor Jones, Bruno and Caitie Jones, Aaron Mandalak, Gary and Debra Sadler
- Produced by B. Simpson
- Engineering: Vance Powell, Eddie Spear, Ben Phillips, Matt Gordon
- Mixing Engineer: Vance Powell, Eddie Spear
- Mastered by: Chris Athens

== Modern Plagues ==
The band's second album, Modern Plagues, was released on April 28, 2017, by New West Records. It features collaborations with the Raconteurs' Brendan Benson and Matt Menefee. Eddie Spear engineered and co-produced the album with Simpson.

=== Personnel ===
- Bryan Simpson – vocals, guitar, mandolin
- Matt Menefee – banjo, electric guitar, synth, piano, mandocello
- Brooke Waggoner – piano, organ, synth
- Royal Masat – electric and upright bass
- Adam Stockdale – electric guitar
- Dave Jackson – drums
- Chris Powell – drums on "Spiral Staircase"
- Eddie Spear – hookah on "Harry Potter," tambourine and animal drums on "Zombie Heartz"
- Jon Estes – electric bass on "Year of the Freak Out" and "40 Years"
- John Painter – horns
- Timbre – harp
- Eli Bishop & Tyler Andal – violins
- Emily Nelson – cello
- Tyler Summers – flute, clarinet
- Phoebe Cryar – featured lead on "Supadope"
- Phoebe Cryar, Callie Cryar Pittman, Doberman Region Act 2 – background vocals on "Head in the Sand", Uncle Buffalo

- Produced by: Eddie Spear and Bryan Simpson
- Recorded by: Eddie Spear at Sound Emporium – Nashville, TN; "Spiral Staircase" recorded at Omni Studios, Nashville, TN
- Assistant Engineer: Zach Pancoast, Jordan Harrell, Logan Yandell
- Mixed by: Eddie Spear
- Mastered by: Chris Athens at Chris Athens Mastering, Austin, TX
- Management: Santo Pullella at Head West Management
