= At the End of the Day (song) =

Single by Kellie Coffey

from the album When You Lie Next to Me
- Released: July 29, 2002
- Genre: Country
- Length: 4:21
- Label: BNA
- Songwriters: Kellie Coffey, Brett James
- Producer: Dann Huff

Kellie Coffey singles chronology
"When You Lie Next to Me" (2001)	"At the End of the Day" (2002)	"Whatever It Takes" (2003)

"At the End of the Day" is a song co-written and recorded by American country music artist Kellie Coffey. It was released in July 2002 as the second single from the album When You Lie Next to Me. The song reached number 18 on the U.S. Billboard Hot Country Singles & Tracks chart. Coffey wrote this song with Brett James.

== Background and writing ==
According to the official single cover, Coffey and Brett James wrote the song after talking about how life is crazy when trying to record an album, be an artist, and live daily life. Coffey said that the message of the song is to not forget who you are and where you came from.

== Chart performance ==
"At the End of the Day" debuted at number 57 on the U.S. Billboard Hot Country Singles & Tracks for the week of August 3, 2002.

Chart (2002–2003)	Peak position
US Hot Country Songs (Billboard)	18
US Bubbling Under Hot 100 (Billboard)	6
