= Wings of a Honky-Tonk Angel =

Studio album by Brad Martin
- Released: June 18, 2002
- Genre: Country
- Label: Epic
- Producer: Billy Joe Walker, Jr.

Professional ratings
Review scores
Source	Rating
Allmusic	3/5 stars
About.com	(favorable)

Wings of a Honky-Tonk Angel is the only studio album of American country music artist Brad Martin. Released on Epic Records in 2002, it features the singles "Before I Knew Better" and "Rub Me the Right Way", which both charted on the Billboard Hot Country Songs charts that year.

== Track listing ==
No.	Title	Writer(s)	Length
1.	"Before I Knew Better"	David Lee, Bryan Simpson	3:36
2.	"Completely"	Mike Geiger, Brad Martin, John Ramey	3:49
3.	"Rub Me the Right Way"	Geiger, Martin, Ramey	2:59
4.	"On the Wings of a Honky-Tonk Angel"	Martin, Rick Williamson	3:08
5.	"Run to Me"	Geiger, Martin, Ramey	3:09
6.	"The Fifth"	Kenny Beard, Tony Mullins, Don Pfrimmer	4:00
7.	"Just Like Love"	Geiger, Martin, Ramey	3:28
8.	"That's a Woman"	Alan Laney, Martin, Williamson	3:01
9.	"Damn the Whiskey"	Martin, Monty Powell, Anna Wilson	2:38
10.	"Walt"	Michael P. Heeney, Martin	3:22

== Personnel ==
- Larry Beaird – acoustic guitar
- Mike Brignardello – bass guitar
- Lisa Cochran – background vocals
- Melodie Crittenden – background vocals
- Eric Darken – percussion
- Dan Dugmore – steel guitar
- Paul Franklin – steel guitar
- Tony Harrell – synthesizer, keyboards
- Aubrey Haynie – fiddle
- Wes Hightower – background vocals
- Jim Horn – saxophone
- John Barlow Jarvis – piano, keyboards
- Kirk "Jelly Roll" Johnson – harmonica
- John Jorgenson – electric guitar
- B. James Lowry – acoustic guitar
- Liana Manis – background vocals
- Brad Martin – lead vocals, background vocals
- Brent Mason – electric guitar
- Greg Morrow – drums
- Russ Pahl – banjo
- Michael Rhodes – bass guitar
- John Wesley Ryles – background vocals
- Neil Thrasher – background vocals
- Billy Joe Walker, Jr. – acoustic guitar, electric guitar
- Biff Watson – acoustic guitar
- Curtis Young – background vocals

== Chart performance ==
Chart (2002)	Peak position
U.S. Billboard Top Country Albums	34
U.S. Billboard Top Heatseekers	32
