= Texas Plates (song) =

Single by Kellie Coffey
- Released: September 22, 2003
- Genre: Country
- Length: 3:32
- Label: BNA
- Songwriters: Kellie Coffey; Brett James
- Producer: Dann Huff

Kellie Coffey singles chronology
"Whatever It Takes" (2003)	"Texas Plates" (2003)	"Dance with My Father" (2004)

"Texas Plates" is a song by American country music singer-songwriter Kellie Coffey. Coffey wrote the single with Brett James, while Dann Huff provided production. It was released on September 22, 2003, as the intended lead single to Coffey's second studio album for BNA Records titled A Little More Me, though the album ultimately went unreleased and Coffey parted ways with the label the following year.

It reached number 24 on the US Hot Country Songs chart, becoming Coffey's third top 40 hit.

== Music video ==
Shaun Silva directed the video for "Texas Plates". Coffey regarded the music video as her best video she had ever done. The video was added to CMT and GAC-TV's playlists for the week of February 8, 2004.

== Commercial performance ==
"Texas Plates" debuted on the US Billboard Hot Country Songs chart the week of October 11, 2003, at number 53, becoming the "Hot Shot Debut" of the week. It reached the top-forty the week of November 8, 2003, at number 40. It reached a peak position of number 24 on the chart the week of February 14, 2004. It spent 22 weeks in total on the chart, becoming Coffey's third highest-charting single. It performed better on the Radio & Records Country Top 50, reaching as high as number 21.

== Charts ==
=== Weekly charts ===
Weekly chart performance for "Texas Plates"
Chart (2003–2004)	Peak position
US Country Top 50 (Radio & Records)	21
US Hot Country Songs (Billboard)	24

=== Year-end charts ===
Year-end chart performance for "Texas Plates"
Chart (2004)	Position
US Country (Radio & Records)	94
US Country Songs (Billboard)	92
