= Www.memory =

"www.memory"

Single by Alan Jackson

from the album When Somebody Loves You
- B-side: "It's Alright to Be a Redneck"
- Released: October 2, 2000
- Genre: Country
- Length: 2:36
- Label: Arista Nashville 69020
- Songwriter: Alan Jackson
- Producer: Keith Stegall

Alan Jackson singles chronology
"It Must Be Love" (2000)	"www.memory" (2000)	"When Somebody Loves You" (2001)

"www.memory" is a song written and recorded by American country music singer Alan Jackson. The song was released in October 2000 as the first single from his album When Somebody Loves You. The song peaked number 6 for Jackson on the Hot Country Songs charts in early 2001.

== Content ==
The song uses Internet terminology, such as "if you feel the need, just click on me", with Jackson directing his fictional lover to a website called "www.memory", omitting a required top-level domain. The lyric describes love gone wrong, but it adds a new twist in that the man invites his old flame to take a stroll down memory lane via www.memory.

== Critical reception ==
Deborah Evans Price, of Billboard magazine reviewed the song favorably, calling it a "winning little tune drenched in steel guitar and resonating with good-ole-boy country charm" She states that the lyric is "cleverly written and delivered in his usual impeccable style."

== Music video ==
The music video features a female driving through a town in a Chrysler PT Cruiser, passing by billboards featuring Jackson's face. It was directed by Morgan Lawley.

== Chart positions ==
"www.memory" debuted at number 46 on the U.S. Billboard Hot Country Singles & Tracks for the week of October 7, 2000.

Chart (2000–2001)	Peak position
Canada Country Singles (RPM)	26 (Note: "www.memory" had not yet peaked when RPM ceased publication in November 2000.)
US Hot Country Songs (Billboard)	6
US Billboard Hot 100	45

=== Year-end charts ===
Chart (2001)	Position
US Country Songs (Billboard)	51
