= Thomas Jeier =

Thomas Jeier (born 24 April 1947 in Minden) was raised in Frankfurt and started writing prose as a student. He proved himself an expert of North America's present and past by publishing travel guides, books on history, biographies and novels (in particular of the western genre). He was translated and published in the United States too.
