= When Somebody Loves You (album) =

Studio album by Alan Jackson
- Released: November 7, 2000
- Genre: Country
- Length: 33:56
- Label: Arista Nashville
- Producer: Keith Stegall

Alan Jackson chronology
Under the Influence (1999)	When Somebody Loves You (2000)	Drive (2002)

Singles from When Somebody Loves You
- 1. "www.memory" Released: October 2, 2000; 2. "When Somebody Loves You" Released: March 5, 2001; 3. "Where I Come From" Released: July 9, 2001; 4. "It's Alright to Be a Redneck" Released: November 5, 2001

Professional ratings
Review scores
Source	Rating
About.com	3.5/5 stars
AllMusic	4/5 stars
Entertainment Weekly	B
People	(unfavorable)
Plugged In (publication)	(average)
The Rolling Stone Album Guide	2/5 stars

When Somebody Loves You is the ninth studio album by American country music artist Alan Jackson. It was released on November 7, 2000, and produced the singles "Where I Come From", "www.memory", "When Somebody Loves You", and "It's Alright to Be a Redneck".

== Reception ==
Critical reception to the album was pretty positive. AllMusic gave the album four out of five stars, saying "Jackson gets a vote not only for holding on to the tradition but because he is able to articulate its heart in a heartless age." While People found the album "innocuous enough" and "mildly amusing," ultimately the reviewer found it "a waste of one of the most distinctive voices in country music."

== Track listing ==
No.	Title	Writer(s)	Length
1.	"Meat and Potato Man"	Harley Allen, John Pennell	2:28
2.	"When Somebody Loves You"	Alan Jackson	3:28
3.	"The Thrill Is Back"	Anna Lisa Graham, Dana Hunt	2:45
4.	"www.memory"	Jackson	2:36
5.	"Where I Come From"	Jackson	4:02
6.	"I Still Love You"	Allen	3:19
7.	"Life or Love"	Allen, Gary Cotton	2:31
8.	"A Love Like That"	Jackson	3:28
9.	"It's Alright to Be a Redneck"	Bill Kenner, Pat McLaughlin	2:44
10.	"Maybe I Should Stay Here"	Robert Lee Castleman, Melanie Castleman	3:33
11.	"Three Minute Positive Not Too Country Up-Tempo Love Song"	Jackson	3:02

== Personnel ==
- Alan Jackson - lead vocals
- Eddie Bayers - drums
- Stuart Duncan - fiddle, mandolin
- Larry Franklin - fiddle
- Paul Franklin - pedal steel guitar, lap steel guitar on "Where I Come From", Dobro on "When Somebody Loves You"
- Terry McMillan - harmonica and Jew's harp on "Where I Come From"
- Brent Mason - electric guitar
- Gary Prim - keyboards, piano
- John Wesley Ryles - backing vocals on all tracks except "Meat and Potato Man"
- Keith Stegall - piano
- Rhonda Vincent - backing vocals on "I Still Love You" and "Life or Love"
- Bruce Watkins - acoustic guitar, banjo on "Life or Love"
- Glenn Worf - bass guitar

== Chart performance ==
When Somebody Loves You peaked at #15 on the U.S. Billboard 200, and peaked at #1 on the Top Country Albums, his fifth #1 Country album. The album was certified platinum by the RIAA in August 2001.

=== Weekly charts ===
Chart (2000)	Peak position
US Billboard 200	15
US Top Country Albums (Billboard)	1

=== Year-end charts ===
Chart (2001)	Position
Canadian Country Albums (Nielsen SoundScan)	28
US Billboard 200	123
US Top Country Albums (Billboard)	11
Chart (2002)	Position
US Top Country Albums (Billboard)	36

== Certifications ==
Certifications for When Somebody Loves You
Region	Certification	Certified units/sales
Canada (Music Canada)	Gold	50,000^{^}
United States (RIAA)	Platinum	1,000,000^{^}
^{^} Shipments figures based on certification alone.
