= The Earl Scruggs Revue =

Studio album by The Earl Scruggs Revue
- Released: 1973
- Genre: Progressive country
- Label: Columbia
- Producer: Ron Bledsoe

The Earl Scruggs Revue chronology
Dueling Banjos (1973)	The Earl Scruggs Revue (1973)	Anniversary Special (1975)

The Earl Scruggs Revue is a 1973 album by the progressive country band of the same name, formed by Earl Scruggs with his sons Gary and Randy Scruggs.

== Track listing ==
Side 1

1. "If I'd Only Come and Gone" (Shel Silverstein) – 2:55
2. "Tears" (Craig Fuller) – 2:12
3. "Some of Shelley's Blues" (Michael Nesmith) – 2:57
4. "It Takes a Lot to Laugh, It Takes a Train to Cry" (Bob Dylan) – 4:25
5. "Step It Up and Go" (Blind Boy Fuller) – 2:25
6. "Back Slider's Wine" (Michael Martin Murphey) – 2:33

Side 2

1. "Down in the Flood" (Bob Dylan) – 2:38
2. "Love In My Time" (Steve Young) – 3:43
3. "Holiday Hotel" (Alan Garth, Jim Messina) – 2:07
4. "Come On Train" (Josh Graves) – 5:30
5. "Salty Dog Blues" (Wiley Morris, Zeke Morris) – 2:10
6. "Station Break" (Earl Scruggs) – 1:59

== Personnel ==
- Earl Scruggs – banjo, backing vocals
- Gary Scruggs – electric bass, harmonica, lead vocals
- Randy Scruggs – electric and acoustic lead guitars, rhythm guitar, backing vocals
- Jody Maphis – drums, backing vocals
- Josh Graves – dobro, guitar, lead vocals on "Step It Up and Go"; backing vocals
- Jack Lee – keyboards

With:

- Tracy Nelson – backing vocals
- Andy McMahon – piano, organ, backing vocals
- Chip Young – rhythm guitar
- The Holladays – backing vocals on "Down in the Flood"
- Karl Himmel – drums on "Love in My Time", "Tears" and "Come on Train"

== Reviews ==
- Erlewine, Stephen Thomas. "The Earl Scruggs Revue - Review". AllMusic.
