= Cadillac Sky =

American progressive bluegrass group

- Origin: Fort Worth, Texas, U.S.
- Genre: Progressive bluegrass
- Years active: 2002–2010
- Labels: DualTone Music Group, Skaggs Family
- Past members: Bryan Simpson; Mike Jump; Clint Sturgeon; Matt Menefee; Ross Holmes; Levi Lowrey; David Mayfield; Andy Moritz

Cadillac Sky was an American progressive bluegrass group based in Nashville, Tennessee. Their debut album "Blind Man Walking" is widely considered to be one of the greatest albums in Progressive Bluegrass music. The band is currently on an "indefinite hiatus."

== History ==
Cadillac Sky was founded in Texas and recorded their first album, Blind Man Walking, in 2006, including mainly traditional bluegrass tunes. The band members at that time were Matt Menefee (Banjo), Ross Holmes (Violin), Bryan Simpson (mandolin), Mike Jump (guitar, vocals), and Matt Blaize (bass, vocals).

In 2008, the band played at the Panhandle Bluegrass Festival in Hedgesville, West Virginia, and released an album, Gravity's Our Enemy.

Mandolin player and singer Bryan Simpson left the band in the middle of a tour in 2010, and was replaced by guitarist Levi Lowrey. That year the band played at Merlefest and guitarist David Mayfield joined the band.

The band's third album, Letters in the Deep combined elements of blues, rock country and jazz with some more traditional bluegrass numbers. Most of the songs are written by members of the band.

At the time the band members decided to go their separate ways in 2011, the lineup consisted of Matt Menefee, Ross Holmes, Levi Lowrey, David Mayfield, and Andy "The Panda" Moritz (Bass).

== Discography ==
=== Albums ===
Title	Album details	Peak chart positions	
Title	Album details	US Grass	US Country
Talent Show	Release date: 2003; Label: Self Release	—	—
Blind Man Walking	Release date: January 23, 2007; Label: Skaggs Family	2	75
Gravity's Our Enemy	Release date: August 19, 2008; Label: Skaggs Family	3	58
Letters in the Deep	Release date: June 8, 2010; Label: Dualtone Records	4	—
"—" denotes releases that did not chart

=== Music videos ===
Year	Video
2007	"Born Lonesome"
2010	"Hangman"
