= Work in Progress (song) =

Single by Alan Jackson

from the album Drive
- Released: June 24, 2002
- Recorded: 2001
- Genre: Country
- Length: 4:07
- Label: Arista Nashville
- Songwriter: Alan Jackson
- Producer: Keith Stegall

Alan Jackson singles chronology
"Drive (For Daddy Gene)" (2002)	"Work in Progress" (2002)	"That'd Be Alright" (2002)

"Work in Progress" is a song written and recorded by American country music artist Alan Jackson. It was released in June 2002 as the third single from his album Drive. It peaked at number 3 on the United States Billboard Hot Country Singles & Tracks chart, and number 35 on the United States Billboard Hot 100 chart.

== Content ==
The narrator tells his significant other to be patient with him because he is a "work in progress".

== Chart performance ==
"Work in Progress" debuted at number 52 on the United States Billboard Hot Country Singles & Tracks for the week of June 29, 2002.

Chart (2002)	Peak position
US Hot Country Songs (Billboard)	3
US Billboard Hot 100	35

=== Year-end charts ===
Chart (2002)	Position
US Country Songs (Billboard)	31
