= When You Lie Next to Me =

Studio album by Kellie Coffey
- Released: May 7, 2002
- Genre: Country
- Length: 41:53
- Label: BNA
- Producer: Dann Huff

Kellie Coffey chronology
When You Lie Next to Me (2002)	Walk On (2007)

Singles from When You Lie Next to Me
- 1. "When You Lie Next to Me" Released: December 3, 2001; 2. "At the End of the Day" Released: July 29, 2002; 3. "Whatever It Takes" Released: February 17, 2003

When You Lie Next to Me is the debut studio album by American country music singer-songwriter Kellie Coffey. Produced by Dann Huff, it was released on May 7, 2002, via BNA Records. Coffey co-wrote seven of the 11 tracks on the album. The album includes the singles "When You Lie Next to Me", "At the End of the Day", and "Whatever It Takes". As of September 5, 2003, the album has sold 415,000 copies in the United States.

== Critical reception ==
Stephen Thomas Erlewine of Allmusic rated the album three stars out of five, describing Coffey as "a more approachable Faith Hill— her polished country-pop is every bit as urbane, yet it doesn't feel as glamorous." Country Standard Time reviewer Jeffrey B. Remz compared her vocals to those of Sara Evans, saying that Coffey's voice was "strong [and] full-bodied" but added that he thought the album lacked a sense of identity. Ray Waddell of Billboard gave it a mostly favorable review, praising Coffey's vocals, although he did note "Whatever It Takes" and the "Breathe-wannabe" title track as unmemorable. He ended his review by saying, "Producer Dann Huff paints a vibrant sonic picture, and Coffey definitely has the goods, particularly when she's allowed to take a chance here and there."

== Track listing ==
No.	Title	Writer(s)	Length
1.	"Bluer Skies"	Kellie Coffey; Franne Golde; Trina Harmon	3:31
2.	"Why Wyoming"	Coffey; Wayne Kirkpatrick	4:13
3.	"At the End of the Day"	Coffey; Brett James	4:20
4.	"When You Lie Next to Me"	Coffey; Harmon; J. D. Martin	3:59
5.	"What It's Like to Be Me"	Ed Hill; Shaye Smith	3:18
6.	"Fingerprints"	John Bettis; James	4:27
7.	"The Simple Truth"	Jennifer Hanson; Kim Patton-Johnston	3:05
8.	"Whatever It Takes"	Coffey; Gordon O'Brian	3:50
9.	"I Just Knew"	Coffey; Josh Leo	3:07
10.	"Love's Funny That Way"	Tina Arena; Dean McTaggart; David Tyson	4:04
11.	"Outside Looking In" (duet with Richie McDonald)	Coffey; Billy Kirsch	3:58
Total length:			41:53

== Personnel ==
- Tim Akers – keyboards
- Bruce Bouton – steel guitar
- Mike Brignardello – bass guitar
- David Campbell — string arrangements
- Lisa Cochran – background vocals
- J. T. Corenflos – electric guitar
- Eric Darken – percussion
- Paul Franklin – steel guitar
- Dann Huff – electric guitar
- Kim Keyes – background vocals
- Billy Kirsch – piano
- Paul Leim – drums
- Brent Mason – electric guitar
- Steve Nathan – keyboards
- Chris Rodriguez – background vocals
- Brent Rowan – electric guitar
- Russell Terrell – background vocals
- Biff Watson – acoustic guitar
- John Willis – acoustic guitar
- Glenn Worf – bass guitar
- Jonathan Yudkin – fiddle, mandolin, cello

== Charts ==
=== Weekly charts ===
Chart (2002)	Peak position
US Billboard 200	54
US Top Country Albums (Billboard)	5

=== Year-end charts ===
Chart (2002)	Position
US Top Country Albums (Billboard)	54
