= Kellie Coffey =

American country music artist

- Born: Kellie Ann Coffey; April 22, 1971 (age 55)
- Origin: Moore, Oklahoma, U.S.
- Genres: Country
- Occupation: Singer-songwriter
- Instrument: Vocals
- Years active: 2002–present
- Label: BNA
- Website: http://www.kelliecoffey.com/

Kellie Ann Coffey (born April 22, 1971) is an American country music artist. She made her debut in 2002 with the release of her single "When You Lie Next to Me", a top-ten hit on the Billboard Hot Country Singles & Tracks chart. Her debut album, also titled When You Lie Next to Me, was released the same year on BNA Records, and in 2003, Coffey won the Top New Female Vocalist award from the Academy of Country Music. She was inducted into the Oklahoma Music Hall of Fame in 2018.

== Biography ==
=== Early life and education ===
Kellie Coffey was born April 22, 1971, in Moore, Oklahoma. She became a regular singer after performing on the Oklahoma Opry at age nine, graduated from Westmoore High School in Moore in 1989, and participated in various musicals while attending the University of Oklahoma.

=== Early career ===
Later on, she moved to Los Angeles, California, where she lived in a friend's apartment. At the same time, she sang demos, as well as music used on the television show Walker, Texas Ranger. She also sang backing vocals for Barbra Streisand at a Las Vegas show.

=== Disney ===
In the late 1990s and early 2000s, Coffey performed on the soundtracks of several live entertainment shows and promotional campaigns at The Walt Disney Company's theme parks. Her credits include:

- IllumiNations: Reflections of Earth at EPCOT, Walt Disney World Resort (1999–2019)
- Believe...in Holiday Magic fireworks spectacular at Disneyland Park, Disneyland Resort (2000–present)
- "100 Years of Magic" promotional campaign, Walt Disney World Resort (2001)
- Imagine...A Fantasy in the Sky fireworks spectacular (2004)
- Wintertime Enchantment at Disneyland Park, Disneyland Resort (2007–present)

=== 2002–2003: When You Lie Next to Me ===
After a showcase at a Los Angeles restaurant, Coffey was signed to a publishing contract with Warner/Chappell Music. Later, she moved to Nashville, Tennessee, where she auditioned for recording contracts. BNA Records, a sister label of RCA Records, signed her in 2001.

Coffey released her debut single "When You Lie Next to Me" in December 2001. The song spent 33 weeks on the Billboard country singles charts, reaching a peak of number 8. It was the title track to her Dann Huff-produced debut album When You Lie Next to Me. She co-wrote seven of the album's 11 songs, including all three of its singles. Following the title track were "At the End of the Day" at number 18 and "Whatever It Takes" at number 44.

Stephen Thomas Erlewine of Allmusic rated the album three stars out of five, describing Coffey as "a more approachable Faith Hill— her polished country-pop is every bit as urbane, yet it doesn't feel as glamorous." Country Standard Time reviewer Jeffrey B. Remz compared her vocals to those of Sara Evans, saying that Coffey's voice was "strong [and] full-bodied" An uncredited article in the Grand Forks Herald described the title track as "one of those lush, lyrical ballads that makes you long for a slow dance with the one you love."

At the Academy of Country Music awards in May 2003, Coffey won the Top New Female Vocalist award. She also toured with labelmate Kenny Chesney in 2003.

=== 2003–2004: A Little More Me ===
In late 2003, Coffey made her fourth appearance on the country charts with "Texas Plates". This song, which peaked at number 24, was intended to be the first release from a second album for BNA, to have been titled A Little More Me. After it, she released a cover version of Luther Vandross' "Dance with My Father" and took it to number 41. A Little More Me was not released. She continued to tour with George Strait until 2004, when Coffey was dropped by BNA and her managers.

=== 2005–present ===
Coffey self-released the album Walk On in 2007. Produced by Wayne Kirkpatrick, the album included 12 songs, 11 of which she co-wrote. Its first single was "I Would Die for That", which Coffey wrote about her own infertility. To promote "I Would Die for That", she released a promotional video on YouTube.

Scott Sexton writes from Country Music About.com "Kellie Coffey's sophomore CD lets you look into her true range as a singer and a songwriter. From the first song to the last you are left wanting more. Kellie co-wrote eleven of the twelve songs on this album, and they are all truly unique. Every song sounded like it came straight from her heart, which made the album that much more enjoyable."

The following year, Coffey did a campaign with the Susan G. Komen Foundation in the production of the video for the title track of her independent album, "Walk On". The video features documentary footage of participants in breast cancer walks.

In 2010 Coffey was the subject of the feature documentary film, "Kellie Coffey: I'm Still Here". On May 26, 2013, she performed "Walk On" at a memorial service for the victims of the May 20 tornado which hit her hometown of Moore.

== Personal life ==
Coffey is married to songwriter Geoff Koch. They have a son, Jackson, who was born in November 2005, and a daughter, Maggie, born in May 2008. She has two brothers named Robert and John.

== Discography ==
=== Studio albums ===
Title	Album details	Peak chart positions	
Title	Album details	US Country	US
When You Lie Next to Me	Release date: May 7, 2002; Label: BNA Records	5	54
Walk On	Release date: June 1, 2007; Label: Duet Records	—	—

=== Extended plays ===
Title	Album details
Why I'm Alive	Release date: November 7, 2009; Label: self-released

=== Singles ===
Year	Single	Peak chart positions			Album
Year	Single	US Country	US	US AC	Album
2001	"When You Lie Next to Me"	8	54	14	When You Lie Next to Me
2002	"At the End of the Day"	18	—^{A}	—	When You Lie Next to Me
2003	"Whatever It Takes"	44	—	—	When You Lie Next to Me
2003	"Texas Plates"	24	—	—	A Little More Me (unreleased)
2004	"Dance with My Father"	41	—	—	A Little More Me (unreleased)
2007	"I Would Die for That"	—	—	—	Walk On
2009	"Dream You Here"	—	—	—	single only
"—" denotes releases that did not chart

- ^{A}"At the End of the Day" did not enter the Hot 100, but peaked at No. 6 on Bubbling Under Hot 100 Singles.

=== Music videos ===
Year	Video	Director
2002	"When You Lie Next to Me"	Deaton-Flanigen Productions
2003	"Whatever It Takes"	Steven Goldmann
2004	"Texas Plates"	Shaun Silva
2007	"I Would Die for That"	Tom Blomquist
2008	"Walk On"	Tom Blomquist

== Awards and nominations ==
Year	Organization	Award	Nominee/Work	Result
2003	American Music Awards	Favorite Country New Artist	Kellie Coffey	Nominated
2003	Academy of Country Music Awards	Top New Female Vocalist	Kellie Coffey	Won
