= Jan de Jong (ice master) =

Dutch Ice rink master

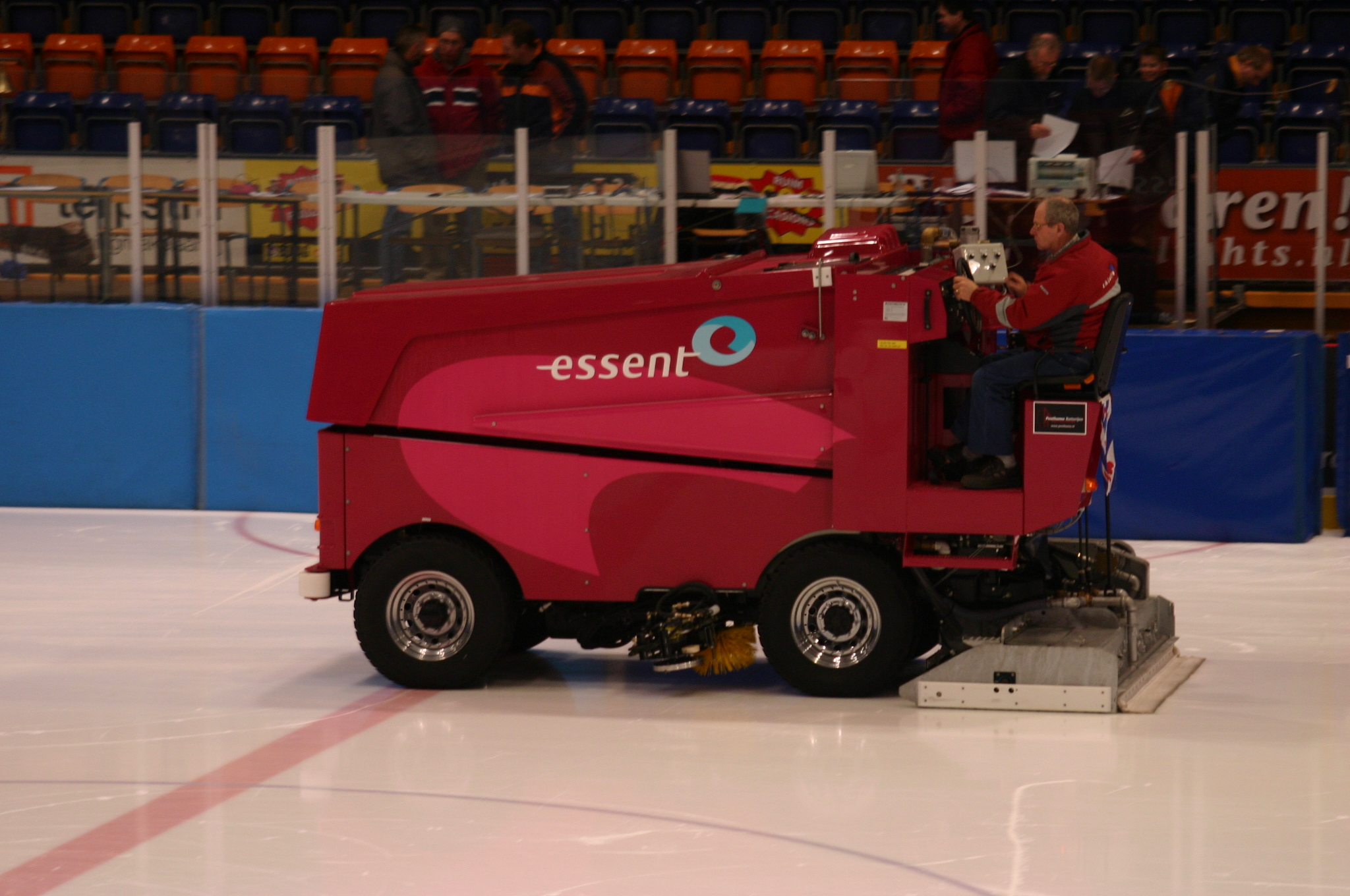
Ice resurfacing in Thialf, 2007.

Jan de Jong (1942 – c. 28 April 2009) was the ice master of the Thialf skating stadium in Heerenveen, Netherlands. De Jong was responsible for the ice in the pre-eminent Dutch skating rink from 1967 when it opened as an outdoor 400-metre oval (the first with a concrete floor under the ice), and then from 1986 on, when Thialf became the first indoor ice stadium in the world, until his retirement in 2000, when he was succeeded by Beert Boomsma.

An ice master's job consists of preparing and cleaning the ice; they control the temperature of the ice to create the fastest possible surface and clean ("mop") or shave the ice to repair damage done by skates. De Jong considered himself the last old-fashioned craftsman, much of the work now being controlled by computers.

== Thialf ==
De Jong was instrumental in the development of Thialf as the premier skating rink in the Netherlands and, for the first years of its existence, a world-record setting rink: until the construction of rinks at higher altitude such as the rinks in Utah Olympic Oval near Salt Lake City and the Olympic Oval in Calgary, Thialf was the location for 35 world records, and De Jong is credited with a total of 38 world records. His importance to Thialf was recognized outside the Netherlands also, the German paper Die Welt, for instance, making note of his retirement in 2000.

Despite the competition from high-altitude venues, Thialf remained (though by a small margin) the fastest oval in the world until at least 1993, for which De Jong was given credit--by that time producing the fastest surface possible had developed into a science. De Jong used ever-changing chemical mixtures instead of just water to create his ice, and was assisted by the School of Human Movement Sciences of the Vrije Universiteit, Amsterdam. In 1993 De Jong and his colleague Mark Messer (from Calgary) looked on in dismay when the Vikingskipet Olympic Arena in Hamar, built for the 1994 Winter Olympics was inaugurated; Bjorn Lindstoen, the ice master in Hamar, could boast two world records and forty national records after two days of World Cup skating. In 1997, Thialf invested in osmosis equipment, giving De Jong cleaner water to make ice with.

== Incidents ==
A number of incidents have made Jan de Jong an important character in Dutch speed skating, and he went on record in 2000 discussing some of them, not long before his retirement from Thialf (there were rumors that he was hired in Salt Lake City, and had guaranteed them a monopoly on world records).

=== Heiden vs. Van der Duim, 1980 ===
In 1980, Dutch skater Hilbert van der Duim was the first man in four years to beat Eric Heiden in the World Allround Speed Skating Championships for Men. Heiden dominated international skating; he was world champion three years in a row, and had won five gold medals at the 1980 Winter Olympics in Lake Placid. At the world championship, however, he managed only a second place (and retired afterward). Years later, De Jong admitted what many had thought at the time: manipulating the ice mopping schedule, he had favored Van der Duim by ensuring that he would skate the concluding 10,000 meters on newly refinished ice, while Heiden had to make do on relatively worn ice, slowing him down so much that Heiden, the Olympic champion on that distance, lost the World Championship to Van der Duim: "Even a five-fold Olympic champion can't go faster on worn-out ice than Hilbert on freshly redone ice," De Jong said later. Heiden said in response that he did not realize he had been short-changed, and laughed it off: "I remember the ten kilometer. When I came out of the dressing room, it was raining. The ice wasn't as fast as I expected, but I didn't think anything of it."

=== Soft-ice to prevent premiums ===
In 1986, when the newly covered Thialf stadium reopened, the organization promised skaters 25,000 guilders per broken world record. On the first day, six records were broken, and management asked De Jong to make the ice slower. He did, by softening the ice; no more records were broken that weekend.

=== "Super soft ice, to put it mildly" ===
De Jong came under severe criticism in 1995 during the European Speed Skating Championships for Men. Although De Jong desired a softer track for the 500 metres and a superhard surface for the 5000 metres, his machinery proved incapable of producing a decent surface for any of the races (though the high number of cigarette-smoking spectators was also cited as a factor). Dutch skater Rintje Ritsma was the only skater who managed to cope with the ice, winning the European title, though he also complained, saying that calling the ice "super soft" was an understatement. De Jong took the blame: "I have made one serious mistake in 28 years, and that was today."
