= Drive (For Daddy Gene) =

Single by Alan Jackson

from the album Drive
- B-side: "Where Were You (When the World Stopped Turning)"
- Released: January 28, 2002
- Recorded: 2001–2002
- Genre: Country
- Length: 4:02
- Label: Arista Nashville
- Songwriter: Alan Jackson
- Producer: Keith Stegall

Alan Jackson singles chronology
"Where Were You (When the World Stopped Turning)" (2001)	"Drive (For Daddy Gene)" (2002)	"Work in Progress" (2002)

"Drive (For Daddy Gene)" is a song written and recorded by American country music singer Alan Jackson. It was released in January 2002 as the second single from his album, Drive. It reached number one on the U.S. Billboard Hot Country Singles & Tracks in May 2002 and also peaked at number 28 on the Billboard Hot 100.

== Content ==
The song is dedicated to Alan's father, Eugene Jackson, who died on January 31, 2000. In the song, Alan recalls as a child he and his father driving around the countryside in an old beat up truck that they fixed up together, as well as a boat they would drive around the lake. In the final verse, Alan talks about sharing his childhood experiences with his daughters and letting them drive his Jeep around their pasture.

== Critical reception ==
Chuck Taylor, of Billboard magazine reviewed the song favorably saying that it's "a heartfelt lyric that allows listeners to share a stroll down memory lane with Jackson and appreciate a kinder, simpler time". Taylor also says that Jackson delivers the song with "the same honesty, integrity, and emotional warmth that has always made listeners powerfully connect to his work".

In 2024, Rolling Stone ranked the song at #52 on its 200 Greatest Country Songs of All Time ranking.

== Music video ==
The music video, directed by Steven Goldmann and animated by The Illusion Factory, follows the plot of the story by showing scenes of a boy and his father driving around in a speedboat and later in his truck. The scene for the final verse shows Jackson driving around in a Ford Bronco, not a Jeep as the lyrics state, with his three daughters. The whole video is presented as animated pictures in a story coming to life out of a book. The music video was nominated for Music Video of the Year in the top award shows and won the award for Best Music Video in the Country Music Awards.

== Cover versions ==
When Jackson was honored by "CMT Giants," country singer Taylor Swift sang "Drive" as a tribute.

== Chart positions ==
"Drive (For Daddy Gene)" debuted at number 53 on the U.S. Billboard Hot Country Singles & Tracks for the week of February 2, 2002.

Chart (2002)	Peak position
US Hot Country Songs (Billboard)	1
US Billboard Hot 100	28

=== Year-end charts ===
Chart (2002)	Position
US Country Songs (Billboard)	2
US Billboard Hot 100	86

== Certifications ==
Region	Certification	Certified units/sales
New Zealand (RMNZ)	Gold	15,000^{‡}
United States (RIAA)	2× Platinum	2,000,000^{‡}
^{‡} Sales+streaming figures based on certification alone.
