= When You Lie Next to Me (song) =

Single by Kellie Coffey

from the album When You Lie Next to Me
- Released: December 3, 2001
- Recorded: 2001
- Genre: Country
- Length: 3:59
- Label: BNA
- Songwriters: Kellie Coffey; Trina Harmon; J.D. Martin
- Producer: Dann Huff

Kellie Coffey singles chronology
"When You Lie Next to Me" (2001)	"At the End of the Day" (2002)

"When You Lie Next to Me" is the debut single by American country music singer-songwriter Kellie Coffey. Coffey wrote the single with Trina Harmon and J.D. Martin. It was released on December 3, 2001 to country radio via BNA Records as the lead single to her debut studio album of the same name.

The song peaked at number eight on the US Hot Country Songs chart and number 14 on the Adult Contemporary chart.

== Content ==
"When You Lie Next to Me" is a country ballad, backed by piano and strings with steel guitar fills. The song's female narrator describes telling her lover of the intense feelings she has for him whenever "[he] lies next to [her]," insisting that they don't waste any chance to spend time with each other.

== Critical reception ==
In his review of the album, Stephen Thomas Erlewine of AllMusic indicated the song as one of the standout tracks and mentioning that it "could be [a] staple on adult contemporary radio.

== Music video ==
The music video was directed by Deaton-Flanigen Productions. In the video, Coffey is shown performing the song from various locations within a large house: standing in a hallway with the wind blowing in, sitting on a pillow surrounded by lit candles, and resting on a pedestal in the middle of a pool.

== Charts ==
"When You Lie Next to Me," after spending 33 weeks on the chart, reached a peak of number 8 on the U.S. Billboard Hot Country Singles & Tracks chart for the week of July 13, 2002. The song also had crossover success on the U.S. Billboard Hot Adult Contemporary Tracks chart, achieving a peak of number 14 in January 2003.

Chart (2001–2003)	Peak position
US Hot Country Songs (Billboard)	8
US Billboard Hot 100	54
US Adult Contemporary (Billboard)	14

=== Year-end charts ===
Chart (2002)	Position
US Country Songs (Billboard)	34

== Release history ==
Release dates and format(s) for "When You Lie Next to Me"
Region	Date(s)	Format(s)	Label(s)	Ref.
United States	December 3, 2001	Country radio	BNA	
United States	August 5, 2002	Adult contemporary radio	BNA	
United States	February 2003	Hot adult contemporary radio	BNA	
