= Where Were You (When the World Stopped Turning) =

2001 song by Alan Jackson

Single by Alan Jackson

from the album Drive
- B-side: "Drive (For Daddy Gene)"
- Released: November 26, 2001
- Genre: Country, soft rock
- Length: 5:05 (studio version); 5:47 (live version)
- Label: Arista Nashville 69129
- Songwriter: Alan Jackson
- Producer: Keith Stegall

Alan Jackson singles chronology
"It's Alright to Be a Redneck" (2001)	"Where Were You (When the World Stopped Turning)" (2001)	"Drive (For Daddy Gene)" (2002)

"Where Were You (When the World Stopped Turning)" is a song written and recorded by American country music singer Alan Jackson. It was the lead single from his tenth studio album, Drive (2002), released on Arista Nashville. The song's lyrics center on reactions to the September 11 attacks in the United States, written in the form of questions. Jackson desired to write a song capturing the emotions surrounding the attacks, but found it difficult to do so.

He debuted the song publicly at the Country Music Association's annual awards show on November 7, 2001. It was released that month as a single and topped the Hot Country Singles & Tracks chart for five weeks; in addition, it reached number 28 on Billboard's all-genre Hot 100 chart. The song received largely positive reviews from critics, who appreciated its simple, largely apolitical stance. The song won multiple awards at the Academy of Country Music and Country Music Association Awards, including Song of the Year, and also earned Jackson his first Grammy Award for Best Country Song.

== Background ==
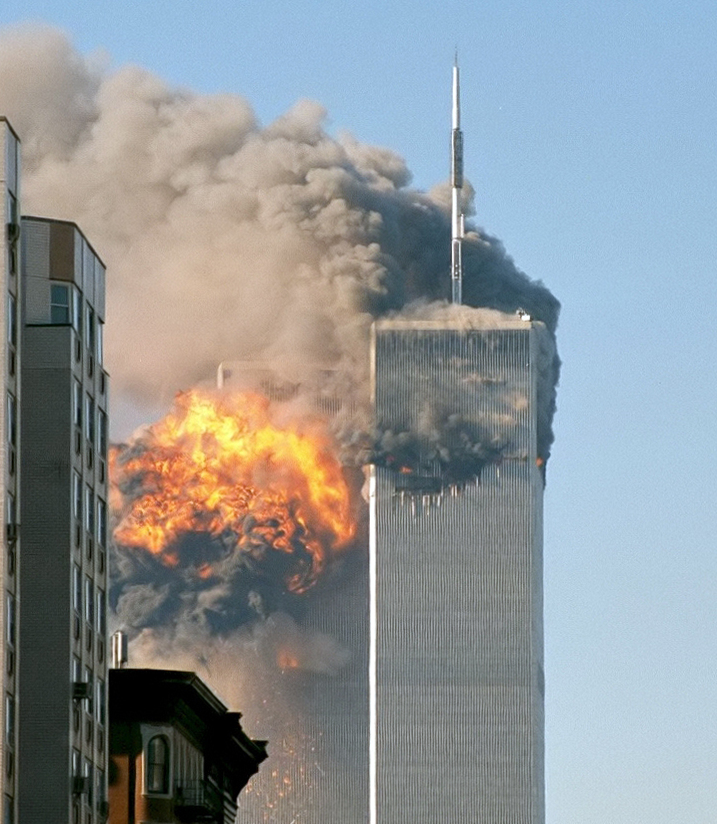
The song was written after the September 11 attacks.

The song is based on Jackson’s own experience on September 11, 2001. Jackson had taken his usual morning walk and returned indoors to discover news of the attacks on television. He immediately wanted to write a song expressing his thoughts and emotions, but he found it hard to do so for many weeks. "I didn't want to write a patriotic song," Jackson said. "And I didn't want it to be vengeful, either. But I didn't want to forget about how I felt and how I knew other people felt that day."

Finally, on the morning of Sunday, October 28, 2001, he awoke at 4 a.m. with the melody, opening lines, and chorus going through his mind. He hastily got out of bed, and sang them into a hand-held digital recorder so as to remember them later on. Later that morning, when his wife and children had gone to Sunday school, he sat down in his study and completed the lyrics.

Initially, he felt squeamish about recording it, much less releasing it as a single, because he disliked the idea of capitalizing on a tragedy. But after he played it for his wife Denise and for his producer, Keith Stegall, both of whom gave their approval, Jackson went into the studio to record "Where Were You" that week. On Stegall's advice, Jackson played the finished track for a group of executives at his record label. "We just kind of looked at one another," RCA Label Group chairman Joe Galante said later. "Nobody spoke for a full minute."

== Composition ==
The verses focus on others' reactions in the form of questions. One verse asks, "Did you lay down at night and think of tomorrow?/Go out and buy you a gun?/Did you turn off that violent old movie you're watchin'/And turn on I Love Lucy reruns?" In between, he asks about the locations of people when the tragedy played out, "Were you in the yard with your wife and children?/Or workin' on some stage in LA?" In the chorus, Jackson tries to sum up his own feelings, first by calling himself merely "a singer of simple songs", and "not a real political man", and finally by paraphrasing the Biblical New Testament's first letter of Paul to the Corinthians, chapter 13, verse 13: "Faith, hope and love are some good things He gave us/And the greatest is love."

The song is in the key of C major with a vocal range of A_{2}-C_{4} and a primary chord pattern of C-G.

== Promotion ==
Jackson was scheduled to perform at the Country Music Association's annual awards ceremony on November 7, 2001, to be aired on CBS. Originally, he planned to perform "Where I Come From", which, at the time, was the No. 1 hit on the Billboard country charts. But mere days before the awards show, Jackson's manager, Nancy Russell, played a recording of "Where Were You" for four of the CMA's top executives. All four were overcome with emotion by the time the song ended.

The day before the show, CMT had a brief note on its web site that Jackson would be introducing the new song during the awards telecast. The next night, after an introduction from the show's host, Vince Gill, Jackson performed "Where Were You" seated on a stool, with an orchestra and backing singers behind him. At the conclusion of the five-minute-long song, the audience gave him an immediate standing ovation. This performance, along with Gill's introduction, is used as the song's music video.

== Track listings ==
US promotional CD single Arista Nashville 69118

1. Where Were You (When the World Stopped Turning) 4:58
2. Where Were You (When the World Stopped Turning) 4:58
  (same version appears twice)

US 7-inch single Arista Nashville 69129

1. Where Were You (When the World Stopped Turning) 5:05
2. Drive (For Daddy Gene) 4:03

== Reception ==
=== Commercial ===
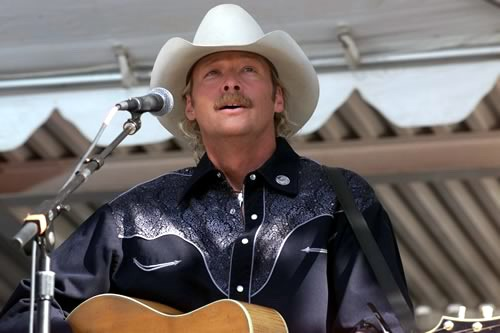
Jackson performing the song at the Pentagon in 2002.

The next morning, many stations already were playing Jackson's new song after taping it from the broadcast. Several pop-oriented stations, including one in New York, started to play it as well. Based almost entirely on that unsolicited airplay, "Where Were You" debuted at number 25 on the Billboard country chart the week ending November 24, 2001, the highest debut since "The Thunder Rolls" by Garth Brooks debuted at number 19 in 1991. A week later, with Arista finally having released a promotional single to radio, it jumped to number 12. On the December 29 country singles chart, "Where Were You (When the World Stopped Turning)" was the number 1 song. It had taken only six weeks to get there, the fastest rise to the top in four years. The song spent five weeks at the top, and it also became a Top 40 pop hit, peaking at number 28. At the time, it was Jackson's biggest country and pop hit.

Jackson's record label determined that it could not manufacture a commercial single fast enough to meet demand. Instead, Arista pushed up the release date for the new album, Drive, from May to January 15. Arista also chose to include both the studio version and the live CMA Awards version on the new album. The pent-up demand for "Where Were You" helped propel the album to the top of both the Billboard country and pop album charts, becoming Jackson's first number 1 on the main album chart. It spent five weeks at the top.

The song was never sold as a benefit song, and it is unknown if proceeds from the song's success were contributed to 9/11-related benefit organizations. Management for Jackson only claimed at the time of the song release that Jackson "has no official ties to any nonprofit group," and he preferred "to make his donations privately."

As of September 2015, the song has sold 395,000 digital copies in the United States.

=== Critical ===
I've always been real careful about writing or recording 'preachy' songs, and I didn't want it to look like I was taking advantage of the situation for my own career or something. I never wanted it to come across that way.

— Alan Jackson on his reservations for the song, 2002

Critical response to the single was positive. Deborah Evans Price (with Billboard) remarked "A multitude of songs have been written and recorded in the wake of September 11, but none captures the myriad emotions unleashed by the terrorist attacks on an unsuspecting nation more perfectly than Jackson's eloquent ballad". Stephen Thomas Erlewine of the All Music Guide remarked, "Given the enormity of the subject-- it's simply not something that can be summarized in song-- it's a surprisingly effective and moving tune". Jackson's reaction to "Where Were You (When the World Stopped Turning)" was this: "I think it was Hank Williams who said, 'God writes the songs, I just hold the pen.' That's the way I felt with this song." He considered the song's success personally overwhelming and uncomfortable due to its subject matter.

After the song's success, Jim Bessman of Billboard summarized its impact: "Deeply personal and self-effacingly simple, [the song] struck a chord with poignant, understatedly eloquent contemplations and a basic, overriding "love is the answer" theme." Dan Milliken of Country Universe rated the song number 7 on his list of the 201 Greatest Singles of the Decade. He stated that the song "cannot travel forward into the future the way other songs on this countdown can; its full impact will remain locked in the memories of those of us who lived through September 11th, 2001, and will never be experienced quite so deeply ever again." Rolling Stone ranked it among the 40 "Saddest Country Songs" at number 11, with a reviewer claiming, "Jackson's heartfelt expression of stunned helplessness encapsulated the American collective consciousness perfectly." Georgia Rep. Mac Collins entered the lyrics into the U.S. Congressional Record, citing the song as "an example of how all Americans can help heal our nation from the wounds we suffered on that tragic day."

Some of the song's lyrics, particularly "I watch CNN but I'm not sure I could tell you/The difference in Iraq and Iran" stood out to critics for other reasons. Bessman wrote that these passages "inadvertently point out our dangerously widespread ignorance of the rest of the world." While not critical of the lyrics themselves, Bessman is critical of the condition these lyrics highlight. Nevertheless, there were some negative reactions to the song. The song was mocked in "A Ladder to Heaven", a 2002 episode of the American animated television series South Park. The show's creators, Trey Parker and Matt Stone, disliked the song; Stone later said in the episode's audio commentary that he felt Jackson was "cashing in on the sentimentality of [remembering the 9/11 attacks]."

=== Accolades ===
Later in 2002, "Where Were You" won both the Academy of Country Music and CMA honors for "Song of the Year" and "Single of the Year". In 2003, "Where Were You (When the World Stopped Turning)" earned Jackson his first Grammy Award, for "Best Country Song". It was also nominated in the overall "Song of the Year" category, a rarity for a pure country song, but it lost to "Don't Know Why", written by Jesse Harris and a hit for Norah Jones. It was also ranked 28th on CMT's list of the "100 Greatest Country Songs".

== Cover versions ==
- Country singer Scotty McCreery covered the song while on the tenth season of American Idol. He would later win the season.
- Taylor Swift covered the song live on her Speak Now World Tour in Vancouver, British Columbia on September 11, 2011, the tenth anniversary of the attacks. Swift also covered the song the following month at a gala for the Nashville Songwriters Hall of Fame.
- Country music singer George Strait covered the song from the television special CMT Giants: Alan Jackson.

== Charts ==
Chart (2001–2002)	Peak position
US Hot Country Singles & Tracks (Billboard)	1
US Billboard Hot 100	28

=== Year-end charts ===
Chart (2002)	Position
US Hot Country Singles & Tracks (Billboard)	24
US Billboard Hot 100	98

== Certifications ==
Certifications for "Where Were You (When the World Stopped Turning)"
Region	Certification	Certified units/sales
United States (RIAA)	Platinum	1,000,000^{‡}
^{‡} Sales+streaming figures based on certification alone.

== See also ==
- "Have You Forgotten"
- "Courtesy of the Red, White and Blue (The Angry American)"
