= Where I Come From (Alan Jackson song) =

Single by Alan Jackson

from the album When Somebody Loves You
- B-side: "A Love Like That"
- Released: July 9, 2001
- Genre: Country
- Length: 4:02
- Label: Arista Nashville 69102
- Songwriter: Alan Jackson
- Producer: Keith Stegall

Alan Jackson singles chronology
"When Somebody Loves You" (2001)	"Where I Come From" (2001)	"It's Alright to Be a Redneck" (2001)

"Where I Come From" is a song written and recorded by American country music singer Alan Jackson. It was released in July 2001 as the third single from his album When Somebody Loves You. In November 2001, the song became Jackson's 18th #1 hit on the Billboard country charts, his only number one from the album.

== Content ==
The song is a moderate up-tempo which finds the narrator, a truck driver, traveling across the United States and finding himself in various situations that make him think about how life in other places is different from his Southern lifestyle. The first verse finds him pulled over by a police officer in New Jersey, who says that he "don't know about that accent". In the second verse, the narrator stops at a diner near Detroit to have a barbecue dinner, which he claims is not like his mother would make it. In the third verse, he is stopped in Ventura after losing his universal joint, when he is met by a lady who asks if "he has plans for dinner”, and finally, in the fourth and final verse, he is driving through Kentucky when asked on the CB radio if he is from Tulsa. After each verse comes a chorus where the narrator explains how the road life is different.

== Critical reception ==
Allmusic critic Thom Jurek described the song favorably in his review of the album, calling it a "redneck anthem" that "rocks a little harder with a ZZ Top-styled guitar".

== Chart performance ==
"Where I Come From" re-entered the chart as a single at number 58 on the U.S. Billboard Hot Country Singles & Tracks for the week of July 14, 2001. The song reached its peak position of number 1 on the Billboard country charts for the week of October 13. It held the position on October 20, then fell to number 2 on October 27, with Brooks & Dunn's "Only in America" taking over at Number One. The next week, "Where I Come From" returned to number 1 for a third and final week at the top.

== Charts ==
Chart (2001)	Peak position
US Hot Country Songs (Billboard)	1
US Billboard Hot 100	34

=== Year-end charts ===
Chart (2001)	Position
US Country Songs (Billboard)	24

== Certifications ==
Certifications for Where I Come From
Region	Certification	Certified units/sales
United States (RIAA)	Platinum	1,000,000^{‡}
^{‡} Sales+streaming figures based on certification alone.
