= Brad Martin (singer-songwriter) =

American country music singer-songwriter (1973–2022)

- Born: Bradley Curtis Martin; May 3, 1973; Chillicothe, Ohio, U.S.
- Died: March 11, 2022 (aged 48) Nashville, Tennessee, U.S.
- Genre: Country
- Occupation: Singer-songwriter
- Instrument: Vocals
- Years active: 2002–2022
- Labels: Epic, Curb
- Formerly of: Martin Ramey

Bradley Curtis Martin (May 3, 1973 – March 11, 2022) was an American country music singer-songwriter. He made his debut on the American country music scene in 2002 with the release of his debut album Wings of a Honky-Tonk Angel, which produced the No. 15 single "Before I Knew Better". In 2008, he and songwriter John Ramey briefly founded the duo Martin Ramey.

== Biography ==
Martin was taught to play the guitar at an early age. He later gained an interest in songwriting, and moved to Nashville, Tennessee in his early 20s. He performed daily in a nightclub, and was eventually spotted by Joe Carter, an artist manager who had previously worked with Tracy Byrd. Carter saw potential in the young artist and he was soon signed to Sony Epic Record Label.

Martin was signed to Epic Records in 2000. His debut single, "Before I Knew Better", was released in 2002, the first single from his debut album Wings of a Honky-Tonk Angel. The album received a favorable review from About.com for its neotraditionalist sound. In addition, "Before I Knew Better" won an award from BMI for being among the fifty most played country songs of 2003. However, the second single from Wings of a Honky-Tonk Angel, "Rub Me The Right Way", failed to make Top 40, as did "Just Like Love". A non-album single, "One of Those Days", followed in 2003 before Martin exited Epic's roster. He remained inactive in country music until joining songwriter John Ramey to found the duo Martin Ramey in 2008. Martin Ramey signed to Curb Records that year.

Martin died in Nashville on March 11, 2022, at the age of 48.

== Discography ==
=== Albums ===
Title	Album details	Peak chart positions	
Title	Album details	US Country	US Heat
Wings of a Honky-Tonk Angel	Release date: June 18, 2002; Label: Epic Records	34	32

=== Singles ===
Year	Single	Peak chart positions		Album
Year	Single	US Country	US Bubbling	Album
2002	"Before I Knew Better"	15	8	Wings of a Honky-Tonk Angel
2002	"Rub Me the Right Way"	51	—	Wings of a Honky-Tonk Angel
2002	"Just Like Love"	—	—	Wings of a Honky-Tonk Angel
2003	"One of Those Days"	50	—	—N/a
"—" denotes releases that did not chart

=== Music videos ===
Year	Video	Director
2002	"Before I Knew Better"	Shaun Silva
