= Before I Knew Better =

Single by Brad Martin

from the album Wings of a Honky-Tonk Angel
- B-side: "On the Wings of a Honky Tonk Angel"
- Released: February 16, 2002
- Genre: Country
- Length: 3:36
- Label: Epic
- Songwriters: David Lee; Bryan Simpson
- Producer: Billy Joe Walker Jr.

Brad Martin singles chronology
"Before I Knew Better" (2002)	"Rub Me the Right Way" (2002)

"Before I Knew Better" is a debut song recorded by American country music artist Brad Martin. It was released in February 2002 as the first single from his debut album Wings of a Honky-Tonk Angel. The song was written by David Lee and Bryan Simpson.

== Music video ==
The music video was filmed in the Holly Desert in Palmdale, California.

== Chart performance ==
"Before I Knew Better" debuted at number 46 on the U.S. Billboard Hot Country Singles & Tracks chart for the week of February 16, 2002.

Chart (2002)	Peak position
US Hot Country Songs (Billboard)	15
US Billboard Bubbling Under Hot 100	8

=== Year-end charts ===
Chart (2002)	Position
US Country Songs (Billboard)	53
