= When Somebody Loves You (Alan Jackson song) =

Single by Alan Jackson

from the album When Somebody Loves You
- B-side: "Meat and Potato Man"
- Released: March 5, 2001
- Recorded: 2000
- Genre: Country
- Length: 3:28
- Label: Arista Nashville 69049
- Songwriter: Alan Jackson
- Producer: Keith Stegall

Alan Jackson singles chronology
"www.memory" (2000)	"When Somebody Loves You" (2001)	"Where I Come From" (2001)

"When Somebody Loves You" is a song written and recorded by American country music artist Alan Jackson. It was released in March 2001 as the second single and title track from the album of the same name. It peaked at number 5 on the Hot Country Songs chart.

== Critical reception ==
Deborah Evans Price, of Billboard magazine reviewed the song favorably, saying that Jackson's "warm-throated delivery turns it into a treasure." She goes on to say that there is a "tender, vulnerable quality to his performance, ideally underscored by the mandolin and dobro that enhance the production."

== Cover versions ==
Country music singer Martina McBride covered the song from the television special CMT Giants: Alan Jackson.

== Music video ==
The music video was directed by Chris Rogers and is filmed entirely in black and white, except for one rose, seen at the end of the video. It was one of CMT's Top 20 most-played videos of 2001.

== Chart performance ==
"When Somebody Loves You" debuted at number 42 on the U.S. Billboard Hot Country Singles & Tracks for the week of March 10, 2001.

Chart (2001)	Peak position
US Hot Country Songs (Billboard)	5
US Billboard Hot 100	52

=== Year-end charts ===
Chart (2001)	Position
US Country Songs (Billboard)	33
