= It's Alright to Be a Redneck =

2001 single by Alan Jackson

Single by Alan Jackson

from the album When Somebody Loves You
- B-side: "A Love Like That"
- Released: November 5, 2001
- Genre: Country
- Length: 2:44
- Label: Arista Nashville 69102
- Songwriters: Bill Kenner; Pat McLaughlin
- Producer: Keith Stegall

Alan Jackson singles chronology
"Where I Come From" (2001)	"It's Alright to Be a Redneck" (2001)	"Where Were You (When the World Stopped Turning)" (2001)

"It's Alright to Be a Redneck" is a song written by Bill Kenner and Pat McLaughlin, and performed by American singer Alan Jackson. It was released in November 2001 as the fourth and final single from his album When Somebody Loves You. Just a few weeks after its release, it was pulled so Jackson's newly penned and highly anticipated single, "Where Were You (When the World Stopped Turning)", could be released.

== Critical reception ==
Deborah Evans Price, of Billboard magazine reviewed the song favorably, saying that while it is a silly song, "Jackson delivers it with a kind of good ole boy charm that works." She goes on to say that a record "this lightweight could derail a lesser artist's career, but Jackson has a history of churning out frivolous little singles that his fans embrace and turn into hits." She concludes the review by saying that the song is a hit, "despite itself."

== Music video ==
The music video was directed by Steven Goldmann and premiered in August 2001, before the song's official release. It begins with a child in an elementary school talking about a presentation on the origins of the word redneck. Alan Jackson makes an appearance and performs the song in front of the class.

== Chart performance ==
"It's Alright to Be a Redneck" re-entered the U.S. Billboard Hot Country Singles & Tracks at number 59 for the week of November 17, 2001.

Chart (2001)	Peak position
US Hot Country Songs (Billboard)	53
