= Bryan Simpson =

American musician

- Born: Bryan Simpson
- Origin: Fort Worth, Texas, United States
- Genres: Country; pop; indie folk
- Occupations: Singer-songwriter, guitarist
- Instruments: Guitar; mandolin; violin
- Years active: 2002–present
- Member of: The Whistles & The Bells
- Formerly of: Cadillac Sky
- Website: thewhistlesandthebells.com

Bryan Simpson is an American singer-songwriter from Fort Worth, Texas, who is based out of Nashville, Tennessee. Simpson is best known for his solo output as the Whistles & The Bells, his work as a founding member of Cadillac Sky, and the songs he has written for artists including Tim McGraw and Joe Nichols.

== Career ==
As a songwriter, Simpson has written songs for Tim McGraw, Blake Shelton, Billy Currington, George Strait, Jason Aldean, and Joe Nichols, whose track "Yeah" went to No. 1 for three consecutive weeks on Billboard Country Airplay in 2014. Simpson also charted with Blake Shelton's "I'll Just Hold On" (2009) at No. 5 and "A Guy with a Girl" (2016) at No. 1, as well as Tim McGraw's "Better Than I Used To Be" (2010), which peaked at No. 5 on the Billboard chart. Simpson has won NSAI's Country Awards Top 50 Songs for his work on Brad Martin's "Before I Knew Better", Tim McGraw's "Better Than I Used To Be", Blake Shelton's "I'll Just Hold On", and Joe Nichols' "Yeah".

In 2002, Simpson co-founded Progressive bluegrass band Cadillac Sky in Texas with Matt Menefee (banjo), Ross Holmes (violin), Mike Jump (guitar, vocals), and Clint Sturgeon/Andy Moritz (bass, vocals). They recorded their debut album Blind Man Walking in 2006 for a January 2007 release on the Skaggs Family label. They followed up their debut with Gravity's Our Enemy in 2008 and Letters in the Deep in 2010, which was produced by Dan Auerbach and released through Dualtone Records. Simpson departed the group in 2010 shortly after embarking on a tour opening for Mumford & Sons.

Following his time in Cadillac Sky, Simpson began a solo musical venture in Nashville, called The Whistles & The Bells. Simpson self-produced and self-released the project's eponymous debut album in 2014. It was recorded over two days with the help of Matt Menefee and Byron House among others. On August 7, 2015, the album was reissued globally by New West Records. The project's second album, Modern Plagues, was released on April 28, 2017, promoted with the lead single "Harry Potter".

== Discography ==
Cadillac Sky

- Blind Man Walking (2007)
- Gravity's Our Enemy (2008)
- Letters in the Deep (2010)

The Whistles and The Bells

- The Whistles & The Bells (2014)
- Modern Plagues (2017)
