= Drive (Alan Jackson album) =

Studio album by Alan Jackson
- Released: January 15, 2002
- Recorded: 2001
- Genre: Country
- Length: 49:37
- Label: Arista Nashville
- Producer: Keith Stegall

Alan Jackson chronology
When Somebody Loves You (2000)	Drive (2002)	Let It Be Christmas (2002)

Singles from Drive
- 1. "Where Were You (When the World Stopped Turning)" Released: November 26, 2001; 2. "Drive (For Daddy Gene)" Released: January 28, 2002; 3. "Work in Progress" Released: June 24, 2002; 4. "That'd Be Alright" Released: December 9, 2002

Professional ratings
Review scores
Source	Rating
About.com	4/5 stars
Allmusic	4/5 stars
Entertainment Weekly	B+
Los Angeles Times	2.5/4 stars
Plugged In (publication)	(average)
Q	3/5 stars
Robert Christgau	(3-star Honorable Mention)
Rolling Stone	3.5/5 stars

Drive is the tenth studio album by American country music artist Alan Jackson. Released in 2002 on Arista Nashville, the album produced Jackson's highest-debuting single on the Hot Country Songs charts in the number 1 hit, "Where Were You (When the World Stopped Turning)", a ballad written in response to the September 11 attacks. "Drive (For Daddy Gene)", "Work in Progress", and "That'd Be Alright" were also released as singles, peaking at number 1, number 3, and number 2, respectively, on the same chart; "Designated Drinker" also reached number 44 without officially being released. In addition, all four released singles cracked the Top 40 on the Billboard Hot 100, peaking at numbers 28, 28, 35 and 29, respectively.

== Reception ==
At the 2003 Academy of Country Music Awards, Jackson was nominated for 10 awards winning Album of the Year for Drive and Video of the Year for the video to "Drive (For Daddy Gene)."

In 2009, Rhapsody ranked the album number 3 on its "Country’s Best Albums of the Decade" list.

== Track listing ==
All tracks written by Alan Jackson, except where noted.

No.	Title	Writer(s)	Length
1.	"Drive (For Daddy Gene)"		4:02
2.	"A Little Bluer Than That"	Mark Irwin, Irene Kelley	2:54
3.	"Bring On the Night"	Jackson, Charlie Craig, Keith Stegall	4:04
4.	"Work in Progress"		4:07
5.	"The Sounds"		3:23
6.	"Designated Drinker" (featuring George Strait)		3:52
7.	"Where Were You (When the World Stopped Turning)"		5:06
8.	"That'd Be Alright"	Tim Nichols, Mark D. Sanders, Tia Sillers	3:41
9.	"Once in a Lifetime Love"		3:25
10.	"When Love Comes Around"		3:07
11.	"I Slipped and Fell in Love"	Harley Allen, John Wiggins	2:55
12.	"First Love"		3:14
13.	"Where Were You (When the World Stopped Turning)" (Live from the 35th Annual CMA Awards, spoken intro by Vince Gill)		5:47

== Personnel ==
- Eddie Bayers – drums
- J. T. Corenflos – electric guitar
- Stuart Duncan – fiddle, mandolin
- Robbie Flint – steel guitar (track 13)
- Paul Franklin – steel guitar
- Vince Gill – introduction (track 13)
- Danny Groah – electric guitar (track 13)
- Greenwood Hart – acoustic guitar, piano, accordion
- Wes Hightower – background vocals
- Jim Hoke – harmonica
- Alan Jackson – acoustic guitar (track 13), lead vocals
- Irene Kelley – background vocals
- John Kelton – tic-tac bass
- Matthew McCauley – conductor, string arrangements
- Mark McClurg – fiddle (track 13)
- Brent Mason – electric guitar
- Gordon Mote – keyboards, piano
- The Nashville String Machine – strings
- Monty Parkey – piano (track 13)
- Dave Pomeroy – bass guitar
- Bruce Rutherford – drums (track 13)
- Tom Rutledge – acoustic guitar (track 13)
- Kim Parent – background vocals
- John Wesley Ryles – background vocals
- Marty Slayton – background vocals (track 13)
- Tony Stephens – acoustic guitar (track 13)
- George Strait – duet vocals (track 6)
- Bruce Watkins – banjo, acoustic guitar
- Bergen White – conductor (track 13)
- Roger Wills – bass guitar (track 13)
- Glenn Worf – bass guitar

== Chart performance ==
Drive debuted at number one on the U.S. Billboard 200, his first number-one debut, and debuted at number one on the Top Country Albums chart, selling 211,000 copies, his sixth number-one country album. The album was certified 4× Platinum by the RIAA in May 2003.

=== Weekly charts ===
Chart (2002)	Peak position
Australian Albums (ARIA)	33
Canadian Albums (Billboard)	1
Norwegian Albums (VG-lista)	11
US Billboard 200	1
US Top Country Albums (Billboard)	1

=== Year-end charts ===
Year-end chart performance for Drive by Alan Jackson
Chart (2002)	Position
Canadian Albums (Nielsen SoundScan)	30
Canadian Country Albums (Nielsen SoundScan)	5
US Billboard 200	15
US Top Country Albums (Billboard)	3
Worldwide Albums (IFPI)	25

Chart (2003)	Position
US Billboard 200	111
US Top Country Albums (Billboard)	12

== Certifications ==
Certifications for Drive
Region	Certification	Certified units/sales
Australia (ARIA)	Gold	35,000^{^}
Canada (Music Canada)	Platinum	100,000^{^}
United States (RIAA)	4× Platinum	4,000,000^{^}
^{^} Shipments figures based on certification alone.
