= Mark Chesnutt discography =

- Studio albums: 18
- Extended plays: 1
- Live albums: 3
- Compilation albums: 5
- Singles: 48
- Music videos: 17
- Other charted songs: 1
- #1 Singles: 9

Mark Chesnutt is an American country music singer. His discography comprises 18 studio albums, five compilation albums, and 48 singles. Although Chesnutt's first release was Doing My Country Thing in 1988 on Axbar Records, he did not break through until his second album, 1990's Too Cold at Home, on MCA Nashville. This album and the two that followed — Longnecks & Short Stories and Almost Goodbye, from 1992 and 1993, respectively — are all certified platinum by the RIAA, as is his 1996 Greatest Hits. 1994's What a Way to Live, the first of four albums that he released on Decca Records, is certified gold.

Chesnutt's first chart entry is "Too Cold at Home" from 1990, a #3 hit on the U.S. country singles charts. After this song came his first Number One, "Brother Jukebox", followed by a string of chart singles that lasted throughout the 1990s; they include the Number Ones "I'll Think of Something", "It Sure Is Monday", "Almost Goodbye", "I Just Wanted You to Know", "Gonna Get a Life", "It's a Little Too Late", and a cover of Aerosmith's "I Don't Want to Miss a Thing". This cover is also his only Top 40 pop hit, reaching #17 on the Billboard Hot 100. He has sold more than ten million records worldwide.

== Studio albums ==
=== 1980s ===
Title	Album details
Doing My Country Thing	Release date: 1988; Label: Axbar Records; Formats: LP, cassette

=== 1990s ===
Title	Album details	Peak chart positions			Certifications (sales thresholds)
Title	Album details	US Country	US	CAN Country	Certifications (sales thresholds)
Too Cold at Home	Release date: September 14, 1990; Label: MCA Records; Formats: CD, cassette	12	132	23	US: Platinum
Longnecks & Short Stories	Release date: March 17, 1992; Label: MCA Records; Formats: CD, cassette	9	68	5	US: Platinum
Almost Goodbye	Release date: June 22, 1993; Label: MCA Records; Formats: CD, cassette	6	43	7	US: Platinum
What a Way to Live	Release date: September 13, 1994; Label: Decca Nashville; Formats: CD, cassette	15	98	—	US: Gold
Wings	Release date: October 3, 1995; Label: Decca Nashville; Formats: CD, cassette	24	116	11	
Thank God for Believers	Release date: September 23, 1997; Label: Decca Nashville; Formats: CD, cassette	25	165	—	
I Don't Want to Miss a Thing	Release date: February 9, 1999; Label: Decca Nashville; Formats: CD, cassette	6	65	6	
"—" denotes releases that did not chart

=== 2000s ===
Title	Album details	Peak chart positions		
Title	Album details	US Country	US	US Indie
Lost in the Feeling	Release date: October 17, 2000; Label: MCA Nashville; Formats: CD, cassette	53	—	—
Mark Chesnutt	Release date: May 21, 2002; Label: Columbia Records; Formats: CD	23	184	—
Savin' the Honky Tonk	Release date: September 21, 2004; Label: Vivaton! Records; Formats: CD, music download	23	70	15
Heard It in a Love Song	Release date: September 5, 2006; Label: Vivaton! Records; Formats: CD, music download	—	—	—
Rollin' with the Flow	Release date: June 24, 2008; Label: Lofton Creek Records; Formats: CD, music download	35	—	43
"—" denotes releases that did not chart

=== 2010s ===
Title	Album details	Peak positions
Title	Album details	US Country
Outlaw	Release date: June 22, 2010; Label: Saguaro Road; Formats: CD, music download	42
Tradition Lives	Release date: July 8, 2016; Label: Row Entertainment; Formats: CD, music download	22
Duets	Release date: 2017; Label: Nada Dinero Records; Formats: CD	—
The Early Days	Release date: November 2017; Label: Nada Dinero Records; Formats: CD	—
Gone But Not Forgotten... A Tribute Album by Mark Chesnutt	Release date: December 2018; Label: Nada Dinero Records; Formats: CD	—

== Compilation albums ==
Title	Album details	Peak chart positions			Certifications (sales thresholds)
Title	Album details	US Country	US	CAN Country	Certifications (sales thresholds)
Greatest Hits	Release date: November 19, 1996; Label: Decca Nashville; Formats: CD, cassette	18	130	14	US: Platinum
20th Century Masters: The Millennium Collection	Release date: November 20, 2001; Label: MCA Nashville; Formats: CD	—	—	—	
Greatest Hits II	Release date: July 1, 2015; Label: Nada Dinero Records; Formats: CD	—	—	—	
Greatest Hits II (Deluxe Edition)	Release date: October 1, 2016; Label: Nada Dinero Records; Formats: CD	—	—	—	
Mark's Favorite Album Cuts (Fan Club Exclusive)	Release date: 2016; Label: Nada Dinero Records; Formats: CD	—	—	—	
"—" denotes releases that did not chart

== Live albums ==
Title	Album details
Live from the Big D	Release date: July 12, 2011; Label: Nada Dinero Records; Formats: CD, music download
Your Room	Release date: August 28, 2012; Label: AIX Records; Formats: Blu-ray Disc
Live from the Big D (Deluxe Edition)	Release date: February 8, 2016; Label: Nada Dinero Records; Formats: CD, music download
Live From the Honky Tonk	Release date: February 26, 2021; Label: Nada Dinero Records; Formats: CD, music download
Live From Cutters (Volume 1)	Release date: April 15, 2022; Label: Nada Dinero Records; Formats: CD, music download
Live From Cutters (Volume 2)	Release date: September 2, 2022; Label: Nada Dinero Records; Formats: CD, music download

== EP's ==
Title	Album details
Christmas	Release date: December 2016; Label: Nada Dinero Records; Formats: CD
Numbers On the Jukebox	Release date: August 14, 2020; Label: Nada Dinero Records; Formats: music download
6 Pack Summer Mix Tape	Release date: June 4, 2021; Label: Nada Dinero Records; Formats: music download

== Singles ==
=== 1990-2000 ===
Year	Single	Peak chart positions			Certifications	Album
Year	Single	US Country	US Bubbling	CAN Country	Certifications	Album
1990	"Too Cold at Home"	3	—	1		Too Cold at Home
1990	"Brother Jukebox"	1	—	1		Too Cold at Home
1991	"Blame It on Texas"	5	—	4		Too Cold at Home
1991	"Your Love Is a Miracle"	3	—	2		Too Cold at Home
1991	"Broken Promise Land"	10	—	7		Too Cold at Home
1992	"Old Flames Have New Names"	5	—	4		Longnecks & Short Stories
1992	"I'll Think of Something"	1	—	1		Longnecks & Short Stories
1992	"Bubba Shot the Jukebox"	4	21	14	RIAA: Gold	Longnecks & Short Stories
1993	"Ol' Country"	4	—	2		Longnecks & Short Stories
1993	"It Sure Is Monday"	1	19	1		Almost Goodbye
1993	"Almost Goodbye"	1	—	2		Almost Goodbye
1993	"I Just Wanted You to Know"	1	—	1		Almost Goodbye
1994	"Woman, Sensuous Woman"	21	—	14		Almost Goodbye
1994	"She Dreams"	6	—	7		What a Way to Live
1994	"Goin' Through the Big D"	2	—	2		What a Way to Live
1995	"Gonna Get a Life"	1	—	2		What a Way to Live
1995	"Down in Tennessee"	23	—	7		What a Way to Live
1995	"Trouble"	18	—	19		Wings
1996	"It Wouldn't Hurt to Have Wings"	7	—	4		Wings
1996	"Wrong Place, Wrong Time"	37	—	13		Wings
1996	"It's a Little Too Late"	1	—	5		Greatest Hits
1997	"Let It Rain"	8	—	16		Greatest Hits
1997	"Thank God for Believers"	2	—	7		Thank God for Believers
1997	"It's Not Over" (with Alison Krauss and Vince Gill)	34	—	34		Thank God for Believers
1998	"I Might Even Quit Lovin' You"	18	—	8		Thank God for Believers
1998	"Wherever You Are"	45	—	56		Thank God for Believers
1998	"I Don't Want to Miss a Thing"^{A}	1	—	1		I Don't Want to Miss a Thing
1999	"This Heartache Never Sleeps"	17	1	10		I Don't Want to Miss a Thing
2000	"Fallin' Never Felt So Good"	52	—	52		Lost in the Feeling
2000	"Lost in the Feeling"	59	—	—		Lost in the Feeling
"—" denotes releases that did not chart

- ^{A}"I Don't Want to Miss a Thing" peaked at number 17 on the Billboard Hot 100.

=== 2001-present ===
Year	Single	Peak chart positions		Album
Year	Single	US Country	US	Album
2002	"She Was"	11	62	Mark Chesnutt
2002	"I Want My Baby Back"	47	—	Mark Chesnutt
2003	"I'm in Love With a Married Woman"	48	—	Mark Chesnutt
2004	"The Lord Loves the Drinkin' Man"	36	—	Savin' the Honky Tonk
2005	"I'm a Saint"	33	—	Savin' the Honky Tonk
2005	"A Hard Secret to Keep"	59	—	Savin' the Honky Tonk
2006	"Heard It in a Love Song"	—	—	Heard It in a Love Song
2007	"That Good That Bad"	—	—	Heard It in a Love Song
2007	"Rollin' with the Flow"	25	—	Rollin' with the Flow
2008	"When You Love Her Like Crazy"	—	—	Rollin' with the Flow
2008	"(Come on In) The Whiskey's Fine"	—	—	Rollin' with the Flow
2008	"Things to Do in Wichita"	—	—	Rollin' with the Flow
2009	"She Never Got Me Over You"	49	—	Rollin' with the Flow
2009	"Goin' On Later On"	—	—	Rollin' with the Flow
2010	"Lovin' Her Was Easier (Than Anything I'll Ever Do Again)"	—	—	Outlaw
2013	"When the Lights Go Out (Tracie's Song)"	—	—	Greatest Hits II
2016	"Oughta Miss Me By Now"	—	—	Tradition Lives
2017	"Hot"	—	—	Tradition Lives
"—" denotes releases that did not chart

== Featured singles ==
Year	Single	Artist	Peak chart positions		Album
Year	Single	Artist	US Country	US Bubbling	Album
2001	"A Good Way to Get on My Bad Side"	Tracy Byrd	21	21	Ten Rounds

== Other charted songs ==
Year	Single	Peak positions	Album
Year	Single	US Country	Album
1997	"What Child Is This"	75	A Country Christmas from WKIS 99.9

== Videography ==
=== Music videos ===
Year	Title	Director
1990	"Too Cold at Home"	Bill Young
1990	"Brother Jukebox"	Bill Young
1991	"Your Love Is a Miracle"	Bill Young
1992	"I'll Think of Something"	John Lloyd Miller
1993	"Ol' Country"	John Lloyd Miller
1993	"It Sure Is Monday"	John Lloyd Miller
1993	"Almost Goodbye"	John Lloyd Miller
1994	"She Dreams"	Steven Goldmann
1995	"Gonna Get a Life"	Sherman Halsey
1995	"Trouble"	Sherman Halsey
1996	"It's a Little Too Late"	Richard Murray
1997	"Let It Rain"	Michael McNamara
1997	"Thank God for Believers"	Richard Murray
1998	"Wherever You Are"	Richard Murray
2000	"Fallin' Never Felt So Good"	Eric Welch
2000	"Lost in the Feeling"	Gerry Wenner
2002	"She Was"	Eric Welch

=== Guest appearances ===
Year	Title	Director
1992	"I Don't Need Your Rockin' Chair" (George Jones and Friends)	Marc Ball
