= Greatest Hits (Mark Chesnutt album) =

Greatest hits album by Mark Chesnutt
- Released: November 19, 1996
- Recorded: 1990–1996
- Studios: Emerald Sound Studios (Nashville, Tennessee)
- Genres: Neotraditional country; honky-tonk
- Length: 40:00
- Label: Decca
- Producers: Previously released material produced by Mark Wright "It's a Little Too Late" and "Let It Rain" produced by Tony Brown

Mark Chesnutt chronology
Wings (1995)	Greatest Hits (1996)	Thank God for Believers (1997)

Singles from Greatest Hits
- 1. "It's a Little Too Late" Released: September 30, 1996; 2. "Let It Rain" Released: March 25, 1997

Professional ratings
Review scores
Source	Rating
Allmusic –	link
Robert Christgau	A−

Greatest Hits is the first compilation album by American country music artist Mark Chesnutt. It features ten hits from his first four studio albums: 1990's Too Cold at Home, 1992's Longnecks & Short Stories, 1993's Almost Goodbye, and 1994's What a Way to Live, as well as the newly recorded tracks "It's a Little Too Late" and "Let It Rain". Both of these tracks were co-written by Chesnutt and released as singles in 1996, peaking at #1 and #8, respectively, on the Hot Country Songs charts. The album itself earned RIAA platinum certification.

== Track listing ==
No.	Title	Writer(s)	Length
1.	"Bubba Shot the Jukebox"	Dennis Linde	3:06
2.	"Too Cold at Home"	Bobby Harden	3:38
3.	"Blame It on Texas"	Ronnie Rogers, Mark Wright	2:49
4.	"Almost Goodbye"	Billy Livsey, Don Schlitz	4:09
5.	"It's a Little Too Late"	Mark Chesnutt, Roger Springer, Slugger Morrissette	2:43
6.	"Ol' Country"	Harden	3:50
7.	"Brother Jukebox"	Paul Craft	3:04
8.	"Gonna Get a Life"	Frank Dycus, Jim Lauderdale	3:43
9.	"Let It Rain"	Chesnutt, Springer, Steve Leslie	3:01
10.	"It Sure Is Monday"	Linde	2:56
11.	"Goin' Through the Big D"	M. Wright, Jon Wright, Rogers	2:34
12.	"I'll Think of Something"	Jerry Foster, Bill Rice	4:12

== Personnel ==
The following musicians performed on the new tracks "It's a Little Too Late" and "Let It Rain".

- Mark Chesnutt – lead vocals
- Matt Rollings – acoustic piano
- Tim Broussard – diatonic accordion
- Larry Byrom – electric guitar
- Brent Rowan – electric guitar
- Biff Watson – acoustic guitar
- Robby Turner – steel guitar
- Michael Rhodes – bass
- Eddie Bayers – drums
- Stuart Duncan – fiddle
- Liana Manis – backing vocals
- Curtis Young – backing vocals

=== Production ===
- Mark Wright – producer (1–4, 6–8, 10–12)
- Tony Brown – producer (5, 9)
- Steve Marcantonio – recording (5, 9), mixing (5, 9)
- Tim Waters – second engineer (5, 9)
- Denny Purcell – mastering at Georgetown Masters (Nashville, Tennessee)
- Katie Gillon – art direction
- Wesley Ligon – art direction, design
- Caroline Greyshock – photography
- Trish Townsend – stylist
- Begonia Moody – hair, make-up
- Robert K. Oermann – liner notes

== Chart performance ==
Chart (1996)	Peak position
U.S. Billboard Top Country Albums	18
U.S. Billboard 200	130
Canadian RPM Country Albums	14
