= Tradition Lives =

Studio album by Mark Chesnutt
- Released: July 8, 2016
- Genre: Country
- Length: 47:08
- Label: Row Entertainment
- Producer: Jimmy Ritchey

Mark Chesnutt chronology
Outlaw (2010)	Tradition Lives (2016)

Tradition Lives is a 2016 studio album by American country music singer Mark Chesnutt. It was released in 2016 on Row Entertainment.

== Content ==
The album includes the track "There Won't Be Another Now", a cover of a Merle Haggard song from his 1985 album Kern River. Chesnutt had recorded the song several years prior and had not intended for it to be on an album, but chose to include it because the album had been released shortly after Haggard's death. "I've Got a Quarter in My Pocket" was first recorded by Gary Allan on his 1998 album It Would Be You. "Is It Still Cheating" was first recorded by Justin Haigh on his 2011 album People Like Me.

== Critical reception ==
Stephen Thomas Erlewine of AllMusic wrote "Throughout the album, Chesnutt keeps things simple, spare, and easy, keeping the focus on the song and the instrumental interplay — the very things that make for great country, of which this is proudly part of that long tradition."

== Track listing ==
No.	Title	Writer(s)	Length
1.	"I've Got a Quarter in My Pocket"	Billy Yates; John Ludowitz	2:46
2.	"Is It Still Cheating"	Randy Houser; Jamey Johnson; Jerrod Niemann	3:50
3.	"Lonely Ain't the Only Game in Town"	Don Poythress; Jimmy Ritchey; Donnie Skaggs	2:57
4.	"Oughta Miss Me by Now"	Trey Mathews; Tony Ramey	3:35
5.	"Neither Did I"	Monty Criswell; Tim Menzies; Ritchey	4:09
6.	"So You Can't Hurt Me Anymore"	Roger Springer; William Michael Morgan; Ritchey	3:49
7.	"You Moved Up in Your World"	Dale Dodson; Brett Eldredge; Curly Putman	3:24
8.	"Look at Me Now"	Blaine Larsen; Poythress; Ritchey	4:14
9.	"Losing You All Over Again"	Larsen; Poythress; Ritchey	3:52
10.	"Never Been to Texas"	Mark Chesnutt; Slugger Morrissette; Ritchey	3:16
11.	"What I Heard"	Byron Hill; Cary Stone	3:16
12.	"Hot"	Poythress; Wynn Varble	3:44
13.	"There Won't Be Another Now"	Red Lane	4:16
Total length:			47:08

== Personnel ==
Adapted from liner notes.

Musicians

- Mark Chesnutt – lead vocals
- Jim "Moose" Brown – acoustic piano, Hammond B3 organ
- Steve Nathan – acoustic piano, Hammond B3 organ, synthesizers
- B. James Lowry – acoustic guitar
- Brent Mason – electric guitar
- Jimmy Ritchey – acoustic guitar, electric guitar, tic-tac bass
- Mike Johnson – dobro, steel guitar
- Michael Rhodes – bass
- Glenn Worf – bass, upright bass
- Eddie Bayers – drums
- Larry Franklin – fiddle
- Wes Hightower – backing vocals

Production

- Jimmy Ritchey – producer
- Ed Seay – tracking engineer, overdubs, mixing, editing
- Jake Burns – tracking assistant, overdubs, editing
- Derek Parnell – tracking assistant
- Erik Hellerman – overdubs, editing
- Tim Roberts – overdubs, editing
- Jason Waite – cover photography
- Mary Sue Englund – album design
- Mike McCary – cover design

== Charts ==
Chart (2016)	Peak position
US Independent Albums (Billboard)	22
US Top Country Albums (Billboard)	22
