= Songs for the Daily Planet =

Studio album by Todd Snider
- Released: 1994
- Genre: Alternative country
- Label: MCA/Margaritaville
- Producers: Tony Brown; Michael Utley

Todd Snider chronology
Songs for the Daily Planet (1994)	Step Right Up (1996)

Singles from Songs for the Daily Planet
- 1. "Talkin' Seattle Grunge Rock Blues" Released: 1994; 2. "This Land Is Our Land" Released: 1994; 3. "Alright Guy" Released: 1995

Songs for the Daily Planet is the 1994 debut album of American alternative country artist Todd Snider. It was released in 1994 via MCA Records.

== Content ==
The album contains 12 songs, all written or co-written by Snider. "Talkin' Seattle Grunge Rock Blues", a hidden track on the album, was a minor radio hit.

Mark Chesnutt covered "Trouble" on his 1995 album Wings, and Gary Allan covered "Alright Guy" on his 2001 album Alright Guy, both of which were also produced by Tony Brown.

== Critical reception ==
Professional ratings
Review scores
Source	Rating
AllMusic	4.5/5 stars
Chicago Tribune	3.5/4 stars
Entertainment Weekly	A–
The Village Voice	(choice cut)

Jack Leaver of AllMusic wrote that it was "a rootsy record that combines country and folk elements with a genuine rock & roll sensibility". Dan Kening of the Chicago Tribune rated it 3.5 out of 4 stars, comparing Snider's sound to Billy Joe Shaver and Steve Earle while noting "deft lyrical insights" on songs such as "This Land Is Our Land" and "You Think You Know Somebody". Rating it "A−", Bob Cannon of Entertainment Weekly compared Snider's sound to R&B music and Bruce Springsteen, while noting that "You Think You Know Somebody" was "moving—the last thing you'd expect from a wiseass."

== Track listing ==
All songs written by Todd Snider except where noted.

1. "My Generation (Part 2)" – 3:09
2. "Easy Money" – 5:16
3. "That Was Me" – 3:15
4. "This Land Is Our Land" – 4:31
5. "Alright Guy" – 4:30
6. "I Spoke as a Child" – 4:16
7. "Turn It Up" – 4:31
8. "Trouble" – 3:42
9. "Alot More" – 4:52
10. "You Think You Know Somebody" – 4:26
11. "Somebody's Coming" (Snider, Mark Marchetti, Shannon Hills) – 4:05
12. "Joe's Blues" (Snider, Joe Mariencheck) – 8:43
  - includes hidden track "Talkin' Seattle Grunge Rock Blues"

== Personnel ==
Compiled from liner notes.

Musicians

- Marshall Chapman – background vocals
- Ashley Cleveland – background vocals
- Peter Hyrka – violin, mandolin, acoustic guitar, squeeze box, finger snaps
- Doug Lancio – additional electric guitar on "This Land Is Our Land"
- Tom Littlefield – background vocals
- Mark "Hoot" Marchetti – finger snaps, vibraphone
- Joe Mariencheck – bass guitar, finger snaps, background vocals
- Joe McLeary – drums
- Terry McMillan – percussion
- Edgar Meyer – double bass
- Eddy Shaver – electric guitar
- Todd Snider – vocals, acoustic guitar, harmonica
- Harry Stinson – background vocals
- Michael Utley – piano, organ

Technical

- Chuck Ainlay – overdubbing
- Tony Brown – production
- Jim Demain – overdubbing
- Richard Dodd – overdubbing, mixing
- Lee Groitzsch – recording
- Steve Hall – mastering
- Roger Nichols – recording, overdubbing
- Steven B. Schnoor – engineering
- Brian Tankersley – recording
- John Thomas II – engineering
- Michael Utley – production
