= I Might Even Quit Lovin' You =

"i Might Even Quit Lovin' You"

Single by Mark Chesnutt

from the album Thank God for Believers
- B-side: "Numbers on the Jukebox"
- Released: March 14, 1998
- Genre: Country
- Length: 3:39
- Label: Decca
- Songwriters: Mark Chesnutt, Roger Springer, Slugger Morrissette
- Producer: Mark Wright

Mark Chesnutt singles chronology
"It's Not Over" (1998)	"i Might Even Quit Lovin' You" (1998)	"Wherever You Are" (1998)

"I Might Even Quit Lovin' You" is a song co-written and recorded by American country music artist Mark Chesnutt. It was released in March 1998 as the third single from the album Thank God for Believers. The song reached #18 on the Billboard Hot Country Singles & Tracks chart.

== Chart performance ==
Chart (1998)	Peak position
Canada Country Singles (RPM)	8
US Hot Country Songs (Billboard)	18

=== Year-end charts ===
Chart (1998)	Position
Canada Country Tracks (RPM)	89
