= Lovin' Her Was Easier (than Anything I'll Ever Do Again) =

1971 single by Kris Kristofferson

- Japanese release picture sleeve

Single by Kris Kristofferson

from the album The Silver Tongued Devil and I
- B-side: "Epitaph (Black And Blue)"
- Released: July 1971
- Recorded: April 1971
- Studio: Monument Recording, Nashville, Tennessee
- Genre: Country
- Length: 3:47
- Label: Monument; ZS7-8525
- Songwriter: Kris Kristofferson
- Producer: Fred Foster

Kris Kristofferson singles chronology
"Jody and the Kid" (1970)	"Lovin' Her Was Easier (than Anything I'll Ever Do Again)" (1971)	"Taker" (1971)

"Lovin' Her Was Easier (than Anything I'll Ever Do Again)" is a song written, composed, first recorded, and first released by Kris Kristofferson. It was also recorded and released by Roger Miller, who included it on his album The Best of Roger Miller and released it as a single in July 1971. Ten years later, it was recorded by Tompall & the Glaser Brothers for the album Lovin' Her Was Easier.

== Lyrics content ==
The narrator describes a lover in somewhat nostalgic terms, using images drawn from nature and references to inter-personal intimacy. As originally performed by Kristofferson, it is in the key of C major.

== Kris Kristofferson version ==
Kristofferson recorded the song on his 1971 album for Monument Records, The Silver Tongued Devil and I.

Kristofferson's rendition of the song was not promoted to country music radio. It reached 26 on the Billboard Hot 100 and 4 on Hot Adult Contemporary Tracks. In Canada, it reached 21 on the RPM Top Singles charts and 8 on that same publication's Adult Contemporary list.

Chart (1971)	Peak position
US Billboard Hot 100	26
US Adult Contemporary (Billboard)	4
Canadian RPM Top Singles	21
Canadian RPM Adult Contemporary Tracks	8

== Roger Miller version ==
"Lovin' Her Was Easier (than Anything I'll Ever Do Again)"

Single by Roger Miller

from the album The Best of Roger Miller
- B-side: "Qua la Linta"
- Released: July 1971
- Genre: Country
- Length: 3:06
- Label: Mercury 73230
- Songwriter: Kris Kristofferson
- Producer: Jerry Fuller

Roger Miller singles chronology
"Tomorrow Night in Baltimore" (1971)	"Lovin' Her Was Easier (than Anything I'll Ever Do Again)" (1971)	"We Found It in Each Other's Arms" (1972)

Miller's version of the song entered the Hot Country Singles chart in August 1971. The song spent eleven weeks on that chart and peaked at 28. In Canada, the song debuted at 50 on the RPM Country Tracks charts dated for September 11, 1971, peaking at 8 on the chart week of October 16.

Chart (1971)	Peak position
US Hot Country Songs (Billboard)	28
Canadian RPM Country Tracks	8
Canadian RPM Adult Contemporary	11

== Tompall & the Glaser Brothers versions ==
"Lovin' Her Was Easier (than Anything I'll Ever Do Again)"

Single by Tompall & the Glaser Brothers

from the album Lovin' Her Was Easier
- B-side: "United We Fall"
- Released: 1981
- Genre: Country
- Label: Elektra 73230
- Songwriter: Kris Kristofferson
- Producer: Jimmy Bowen

Tompall & the Glaser Brothers singles chronology
"Sweet City Woman" (1980)	"Lovin' Her Was Easier (than Anything I'll Ever Do Again)" (1981)	"Just One Time" (1981)

Tompall & the Glaser Brothers recorded the song in the 1970's, releasing it on the album Vocal Group Of The Decade. They also recorded the song in 1981. This was the group's third single following its 1980 reunion, as frontman Tompall Glaser had departed the group in 1973 for a solo career. Released in mid-1981, this version of "Lovin' Her Was Easier" went on to become the group's highest-charting single. It was also the title track of the Glaser brothers's reunion album, Lovin' Her Was Easier. Following the release of this song, the Glaser brothers recorded only four more cuts for Elektra before disbanding a second time.

=== Chart performance ===
Tompall & the Glaser Brothers' rendition of the song spent sixteen weeks on the Billboard country music chart. The song reached a peak of number 2 on that chart, holding the position for two weeks. It also reached a number 2 peak on the RPM country singles charts.

Chart (1981)	Peak position
US Hot Country Songs (Billboard)	2
Canadian RPM Hot Country Singles	2

== Mark Chesnutt version ==
In 2010, Mark Chesnutt included his version of the song on his album Outlaw, an album which comprises covers of songs recorded by "outlaw" country music artists. His version was released as the first single from it. Chesnutt told LimeWire that, although he was familiar with both Kristofferson's and the Glaser Brothers's renditions of the songs, he "wasn't a big fan of the song" until he heard Waylon Jennings sing it. (Jennings recorded the song on his 1971 album The Taker/Tulsa.)

== Other versions ==
- Waylon Jennings recorded the song for his 1971 album The Taker / Tulsa
- Billie Jo Spears recorded the song as "Loving him was easier (than anything I'll ever do again)" in 1977 for her album If you want me
- Nana Mouskouri recorded the song as "Loving Him Was Easier" in 1982 for her album Song for Liberty
- Willie Nelson and Dyan Cannon recorded the song as "Loving Her Was Easier (Than Anything I'll Ever Do Again)" for the film Honeysuckle Rose
- Anita Carter with Billy Sanford (gt) Recorded 29 January 1971
- Skeeter Davis with Vocal Accompaniment by The Jordanaires and The Nashville Edition, 1972
- Billy Ray Cyrus recorded the song for his 2016 album Thin Line
- The Highwaymen performed the song during their American Outlaws tour in 1990; the song′s featured on their compilation album Live: American Outlaws (2016)
