= Rollin' with the Flow (album) =

Studio album by Mark Chesnutt
- Released: June 24, 2008
- Studio: OmniSound Studios (Nashville, Tennessee); Fox Ridge Studios (Brentwood, Tennessee)
- Genre: Country
- Length: 39:54
- Label: Lofton Creek
- Producer: Jimmy Ritchey

Mark Chesnutt chronology
Heard It in a Love Song (2006)	Rollin' with the Flow (2008)	Outlaw (2010)

Singles from Rollin' with the Flow
- 1. "Rollin' with the Flow" Released: August 2007

Professional ratings
Review scores
Source	Rating
Allmusic	4/5 stars
Engine 145	3/5 stars

Rollin' with the Flow is the thirteenth studio album of American country music artist Mark Chesnutt. It was released on June 24, 2008. Its lead-off single and title track, a cover of Charlie Rich's Number One hit from 1977, peaked at #25 on the Billboard country charts in early 2008. "When You Love Her Like Crazy", "(Come on In) The Whiskey's Fine", "Things to Do in Wichita," and "Going On Later On" were also released, all of which failed to chart.

The fifth single serviced to radio, is "She Never Got Me Over You" which is the last song written by Keith Whitley. Hank Cochran had held on to this song, until he offered it to Mark in 2007. The song was released to radio in March 2009. The song debuted on the Hot Country Songs chart at #60 on the chart dated April 11, 2009, and reached a peak of #49.

== Track listing ==
No.	Title	Writer(s)	Length
1.	"Things to Do in Wichita"	Jimmy Ritchey, Bob Regan	3:35
2.	"When You Love Her Like Crazy"	Tony Martin, Mark Nesler	3:36
3.	"Rollin' with the Flow"	Jerry Hayes	2:48
4.	"Going On Later On"	Ritchey, Regan	2:28
5.	"Live to Be 100"	Jim Collins, Martin, Nesler	4:03
6.	"When I Get This Close to You"	Phil O'Donnell, Buddy Owens, Billy Lawson	3:17
7.	"(Come on In) The Whiskey's Fine"	O'Donnell, Dave Turnbull, J.R. Shelby	3:50
8.	"If the Devil Brought You Roses"	Tony Stampley, Toni Dae, Kim Williams	3:10
9.	"Woman"	Roger Springer, Martin	3:02
10.	"Man in the Mirror"	Mark Chesnutt, Springer, Noah Kelley	3:32
11.	"Long Way to Go"	Chesnutt, Springer	3:28
12.	"She Never Got Me Over You"	Keith Whitley, Dean Dillon, Hank Cochran	3:05

== Personnel ==
- Mark Chesnutt – lead vocals
- Jim "Moose" Brown – acoustic piano
- John Barlow Jarvis – acoustic piano
- Gordon Mote – acoustic piano
- Paul Grégorie – accordion
- B. James Lowry – acoustic guitar, gut string guitar
- Brent Mason – electric guitar
- Jimmy Ritchey – acoustic guitar, baritone guitar, electric guitar
- Paul Franklin – steel guitar
- Glenn Worf – bass
- Eddie Bayers – drums
- Lonnie Wilson – drums
- Larry Franklin – fiddle
- Jonathan Yudkin – cello, string bass, viola, violin
- Tania Hancheroff – backing vocals
- Wes Hightower – backing vocals

=== Production ===
- Kelly Williams – executive producer
- Jimmy Ritchey – producer
- Erik Hellerman – engineer
- Stoker White – second engineer
- Clark Schleicher – mixing at Warner Bros. Studios (Nashville, Tennessee)
- Andrew Bazinet – second mix engineer
- John Mayfield – mastering at Mayfield Mastering (Nashville, Tennessee)
- Grant Lovett – photography
- Mark Borchetta – design, layout

== Chart performance ==
Chart (2008)	Peak position
U.S. Billboard Top Country Albums	35
U.S. Billboard Top Independent Albums	43
