= Bandana (country band) =

American country music band

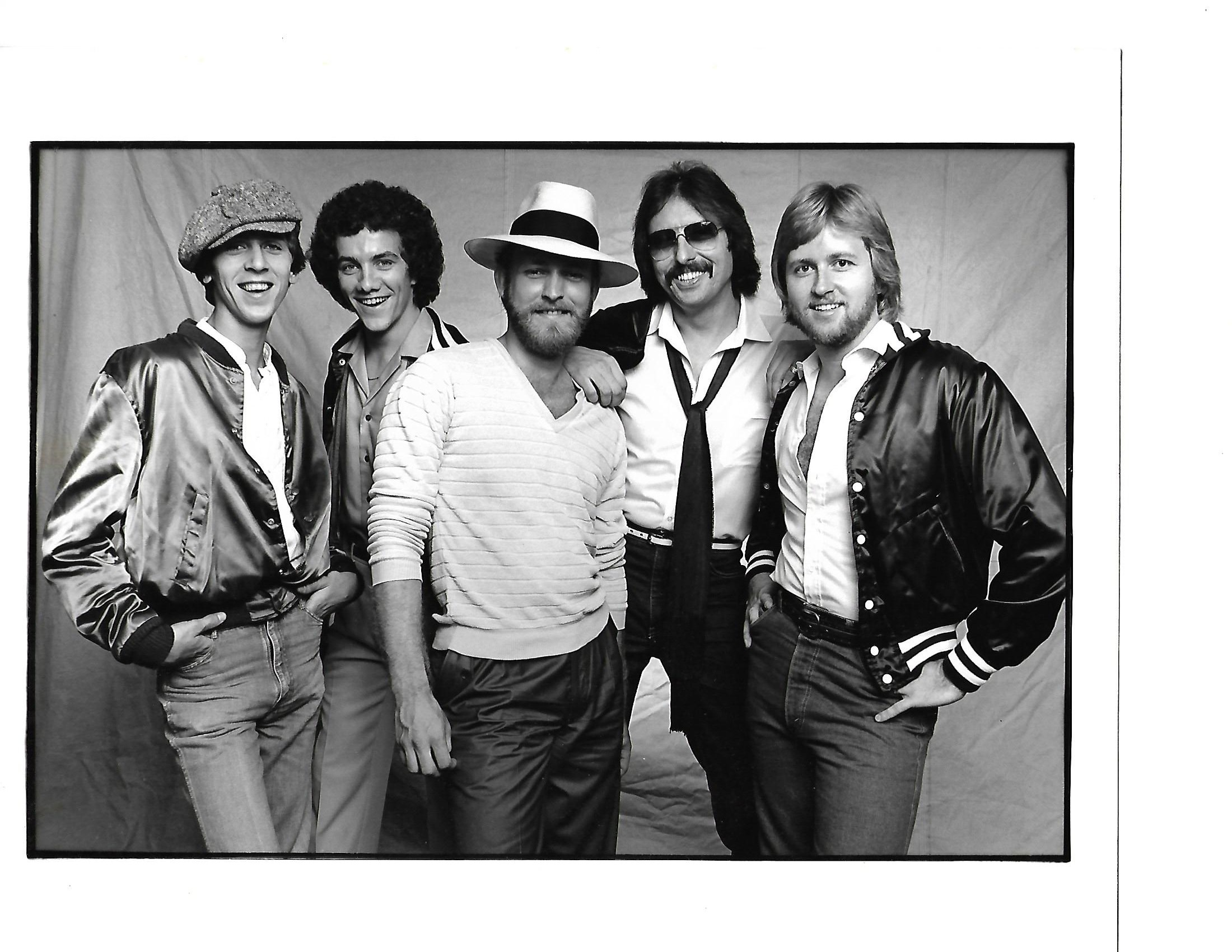
- The original Bandana lineup signed to Warner Bros. Records. L to R: Jerry Ray Johnston, Tim Menzies, Lonnie Wilson, Jerry Fox, Joe Van Dyke.

Background information
- Origin: Nashville, Tennessee, U.S.
- Genre: Country
- Years active: 1982–1986
- Label: Warner Bros. Nashville
- Past members: Jerry Fox; Jerry Ray Johnston; Tim Mensy; Joe Van Dyke; Lonnie Wilson; Michael Black; Billy Kemp; Bob Mummert

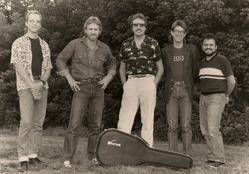
The 1986 personnel lineup: L to R: Bob Mummert, Lonnie Wilson, Jerry Fox, Billy Kemp, Michael Black.

Bandana was an American country music band from Nashville, Tennessee. The band was originally composed of Lonnie Wilson (lead vocals), Jerry Fox (bass guitar), Tim Menzies (guitar), Joe Van Dyke (keyboards), and Jerry Ray Johnston (drums). After Menzies, Johnston and Van Dyke left, they were replaced with Michael Black and Billy Kemp on guitars, and Bob Mummert on drums. Between 1982 and 1986, they were signed to Warner Bros. Records, on which they charted ten singles on the Billboard Hot Country Singles (now Hot Country Songs) charts, including the top 20 hits "The Killin' Kind" and "Outside Lookin' In". The latter also appeared on a self-titled album.

After disbanding, Menzies assumed the name Tim Mensy. He began a solo career, and later wrote hit singles for other artists. Wilson found work as a session drummer. Johnston's son, Jaren Johnston, founded the Southern rock group American Bang, which disbanded and re-established as The Cadillac Three. Jerry Ray Johnston died on January 9, 2022. Mummert later played drums for Radney Foster and Dailey & Vincent, and died in 2023.

== Discography ==
=== Singles ===
Year	Title	US Country	Album
1982	"Guilty Eyes"	37	single only
1982	"Cheatin' State of Mind"	61	single only
1982	"The Killin' Kind"	17	single only
1983	"I Can't Get over You (Getting over Me)"	29	single only
1983	"Outside Lookin' In"	18	Bandana
1984	"Better Our Hearts Should Bend (Than Break)"	26	Bandana
1984	"All I Wanna Do (Is Make Love to You)"	52	single only
1985	"It's Just Another Heartache"	46	Bandana
1985	"Lovin' Up a Storm"	37	Bandana
1986	"Touch Me"	54	single only
