= Wings (Mark Chesnutt album) =

Studio album by Mark Chesnutt
- Released: October 3, 1995
- Recorded: 1994–1995
- Studios: Emerald Sound (Nashville, Tennessee)
- Genre: Country
- Length: 32:54
- Label: Decca
- Producer: Tony Brown

Mark Chesnutt chronology
| What a Way to Live (1994) | Wings (1995) | Greatest Hits (1996) |

Singles from Wings
- 1. "Trouble" Released: September 12, 1995; 2. "It Wouldn't Hurt to Have Wings" Released: December 18, 1995; 3. "Wrong Place, Wrong Time" Released: May 4, 1996

Professional ratings
Review scores
| Source | Rating |
|---|---|
| Allmusic | 4.5/5 stars |
| Entertainment Weekly | (B+) |

Wings is the sixth studio album by American country music artist Mark Chesnutt, and his second for Decca Records. Released in late 1995, it features the singles "Trouble", "It Wouldn't Hurt to Have Wings", and "Wrong Place, Wrong Time". Respectively, these reached #18, #7, and #37 on the Billboard Hot Country Songs charts. Unlike Chesnutt's first five albums, which were produced by Mark Wright, Wings was produced by Tony Brown. This was the first album of Chesnutt's career not to achieve RIAA certification.

"The King of Broken Hearts" was previously recorded by George Strait on the soundtrack of the 1992 film Pure Country, and was later covered by Lee Ann Womack on her 2008 album Call Me Crazy. "Trouble" was originally recorded by Todd Snider on his 1994 debut album Songs for the Daily Planet.

== Track listing ==
| No. | Title | Writer(s) | Length |
|---|---|---|---|
| 1. | "As the Honky Tonk Turns" | Mark Chesnutt, Roger Springer, Tommy Nixon | 3:39 |
| 2. | "The King of Broken Hearts" | Jim Lauderdale | 3:03 |
| 3. | "Trouble" | Todd Snider | 3:34 |
| 4. | "(I Think) I've Finally Broken Mine" | Johnny MacRae, Steve Clark | 3:19 |
| 5. | "Wrong Place, Wrong Time" | Jimmy Alan Stewart, Scott Miller | 3:33 |
| 6. | "I May Be a Fool" | Lauderdale, Clay Blaker | 2:49 |
| 7. | "It Wouldn't Hurt to Have Wings" | Jerry Foster, Roger LaVoie, Johnny Morris | 3:12 |
| 8. | "Pride's Not Hard to Swallow" | Jerry Chesnut | 3:20 |
| 9. | "Settlin' for What They Get" | Mack Vickery | 3:25 |
| 10. | "Strangers" | Springer, Chesnutt, Aimee Mayo | 3:00 |

== Personnel ==
- Mark Chesnutt – lead vocals
- Steve Nathan – acoustic piano, keyboards, synthesizers, Hammond B3 organ
- Larry Byrom – electric guitars
- Brent Mason – electric guitars, tic tac bass
- Billy Joe Walker, Jr. – electric guitars, acoustic guitars
- Biff Watson – acoustic guitars
- Paul Franklin – steel guitar
- Glenn Worf – bass
- Lonnie Wilson – drums
- Terry McMillan – harmonica, percussion
- Rob Hajacos – fiddle
- Liana Manis – backing vocals
- John Wesley Ryles – backing vocals
- Harry Stinson – backing vocals

=== Production ===
- Tony Brown – producer
- Steve Tillisch – recording, mixing, mastering
- Grant Greene – recording assistant, mix assistant
- Glenn Meadows – mastering
- Masterfonics (Nashville, Tennessee) – mastering location
- Jessie Noble – project coordinator
- Virginia Team – art direction
- Elizabeth Workman – design
- Mark Tucker – photography
- Trish Townsend – stylist
- Debra Wingo – hair
- Mary Beth Felts – make-up
- The BDM Company – management

== Chart performance ==
| Chart (1995) | Peak position |
|---|---|
| U.S. Billboard Top Country Albums | 24 |
| U.S. Billboard 200 | 116 |
| Canadian RPM Country Albums | 11 |
