= Thank God for Believers =

Studio album by Mark Chesnutt
- Released: September 23, 1997
- Recorded: 1997
- Studios: Big Javelina (Nashville, Tennessee); Sound Kitchen (Franklin, Tennessee)
- Genre: Country
- Length: 32:25
- Label: Decca
- Producer: Mark Wright

Mark Chesnutt chronology
Greatest Hits (1996)	Thank God for Believers (1997)	I Don't Want to Miss a Thing (1999)

Singles from Thank God for Believers
- 1. "Thank God for Believers" Released: July 15, 1997; 2. "It's Not Over" Released: December 1997; 3. "I Might Even Quit Lovin' You" Released: March 14, 1998

Professional ratings
Review scores
Source	Rating
Allmusic	4/5 stars
Entertainment Weekly	(B+)

Thank God for Believers is the seventh studio album by American country music artist Mark Chesnutt. His third album for Decca Records, it produced four singles on the Billboard Hot Country Songs charts between 1997 and 1998: the title track (number 2), "It's Not Over" (number 34), "I Might Even Quit Lovin' You" (number 18), and "Wherever You Are" (number 45). "Wherever You Are" was the first single of Chesnutt's career to miss the Top 40 on the country charts. With this album, Chesnutt is also reunited with producer Mark Wright, who produced Chesnutt's first four MCA Nashville albums.

"It's Not Over" was previously recorded by Chesnutt on his third album, 1992's Longnecks & Short Stories, and before that by Reba McEntire on her 1984 album My Kind of Country. The version included on this album is the same as on Longnecks & Short Stories. Chesnutt chose to include it because he felt that it should have been released as a single from the original album, and suggested that it be included to replace another song that he felt did not fit thematically with the rest of the album.

== Track listing ==
No.	Title	Writer(s)	Length
1.	"Goodbye Heartache"	Mark Chesnutt, Steve Leslie, Roger Springer	2:52
2.	"Thank God for Believers"	Mark Alan Springer, R. Springer, Tim Johnson	3:25
3.	"Wherever You Are"	R. Springer, Reese Wilson, Tony Martin	3:25
4.	"I Might Even Quit Lovin' You"	Chesnutt, R. Springer, Slugger Morrissette	3:38
5.	"Numbers on the Jukebox"	Chesnutt, R. Springer, Morrissette	3:20
6.	"That Side of You"	Chesnutt, Leslie, R. Springer	3:37
7.	"Useless"	Mark Wright, R. Springer, Robert Arthur	2:34
8.	"Hello Honky Tonk"	Ron Harbin, Kim Williams, L. David Lewis	2:46
9.	"Any Ole Reason"	Chesnutt, R. Springer, Morrissette	3:13
10.	"It's Not Over" (featuring Vince Gill and Alison Krauss)	Mark Wright, Larry Kingston	3:18

== Personnel ==
As listed in liner notes.

- Mark Chesnutt – lead vocals
- Steve Nathan – acoustic piano (1–9), synthesizers (1–9), Hammond B3 organ (1–9)
- Hargus "Pig" Robbins – acoustic piano (10)
- Pat Flynn – acoustic guitar (1–6, 8–10)
- B. James Lowry – acoustic guitar (1–6, 8, 9)
- Brent Rowan – electric guitars
- Biff Watson – acoustic guitar (7, 10)
- Buddy Emmons – steel guitar (1–6, 8, 9)
- Paul Franklin – steel guitar (7, 10)
- Michael Rhodes – bass (1–6, 8, 9)
- Mike Brignardello – bass (7)
- Bob Wray – bass (10)
- Owen Hale – drums (1–9)
- Paul Leim – drums (10)
- Larry Franklin – fiddle (1–9)
- Hank Singer – fiddle (8)
- Rob Hajacos – fiddle (10)
- Nashville String Machine – strings
- Bergen White – string arrangements, additional backing vocals (1, 5)
- Carl Gorodetzky – string conductor
- Liana Manis – backing vocals (1–9)
- Louis Nunley – backing vocals (1–9)
- John Wesley Ryles – backing vocals (1–9)
- Curtis Young – backing vocals (1–9)
- Jana King Evans – additional backing vocals (1, 5)
- Lisa Silver – additional backing vocals (1, 5)
- Vince Gill – harmony vocals (10)
- Alison Krauss – harmony vocals (10)

=== Production ===
- Mark Wright – producer
- Steve Marcantonio – recording
- Greg Droman – overdub recording, mixing
- Tim Coyle – second engineer
- Joe Hayden – second engineer
- Hank Williams – mastering
- Ronnie Thomas – mastering
- MasterMix (Nashville, Tennessee) – mastering location
- Virginia Team – art direction, additional photography
- Chris Ferrara – design
- Jim "Señor" McGuire – photography
- The BDM Company – management

== Chart performance ==
Chart (1997)	Peak position
U.S. Billboard Top Country Albums	25
U.S. Billboard 200	165
