= What a Way to Live =

Studio album by Mark Chesnutt
- Released: September 13, 1994
- Recorded: 1993–1994
- Studio: Javelina Studios and Woodland Sound Studios (Nashville, Tennessee)
- Genre: Country
- Length: 33:25
- Label: Decca
- Producer: Mark Wright

Mark Chesnutt chronology
Almost Goodbye (1993)	What a Way to Live (1994)	Wings (1995)

Singles from What a Way to Live
- 1. "She Dreams" Released: July 12, 1994; 2. "Goin' Through the Big D" Released: October 18, 1994; 3. "Gonna Get a Life" Released: February 21, 1995; 4. "Down in Tennessee" Released: June 12, 1995

Professional ratings
Review scores
Source	Rating
Allmusic	3/5 stars

What a Way to Live is the fifth studio album by American country music artist Mark Chesnutt. His first album for Decca Records, it earned RIAA gold certification in the United States for sales of 500,000 copies. The tracks "She Dreams", "Goin' Through the Big D", "Gonna Get a Life", and "Down in Tennessee" were all released as singles, peaking at #6, #2, #1, and #23, respectively, on the Billboard Hot Country Songs charts. "She Dreams" was co-written and originally recorded by Tim Mensy on his 1992 album This Ol' Heart, from which it was released as a single, peaking at #74 on the country charts that year. Mark duets with Waylon Jennings on the track "Rainy Day Woman" which Jennings first recorded on his 1974 album The Ramblin' Man. The title track was originally recorded by Willie Nelson in 1960.

== Track listing ==
No.	Title	Writer(s)	Length
1.	"What a Way to Live"	Hank Craig; Willie Nelson	2:40
2.	"Live a Little"	Tony Martin; Roger Springer	2:46
3.	"She Dreams"	Gary Harrison; Tim Mensy	3:43
4.	"Goin' Through the Big D"	Ronnie Rogers; John Wright; Mark Wright	2:34
5.	"Down in Tennessee"	Wayland Holyfield	3:21
6.	"Gonna Get a Life"	Frank Dycus; Jim Lauderdale	3:43
7.	"It's Almost Like You're Here"	Charles Quillen; John Priestley; Jonathan Clift	3:34
8.	"Rainy Day Woman" (duet with Waylon Jennings)	Waylon Jennings	3:51
9.	"This Side of the Door"	Mensy; Shawn Camp	3:23
10.	"Half of Everything (And All of My Heart)"	Mark Chesnutt; Glenn Gordon; David Lott	3:50
Total length:			33:25

== Personnel ==
- Mark Chesnutt – vocals
- Steve Nathan – keyboards
- Matt Rollings – acoustic piano
- Tim Broussard – squeezebox
- Pat Flynn – acoustic guitar
- B. James Lowry – acoustic guitar
- Tim Mensy – acoustic guitar
- Biff Watson – acoustic guitar
- Brent Rowan – electric guitars
- Paul Franklin – steel guitar
- Russ Pahl – steel guitar
- Bob Wray – bass guitar
- Roy Huskey Jr. – upright bass
- Owen Hale – drums
- Paul Leim – drums
- Glen Duncan – fiddle, mandolin
- Rob Hajacos – fiddle
- Nashville String Machine – strings
- Bergen White – string arrangements, backing vocals
- Carl Gorodetzky – string conductor
- Thom Flora – backing vocals
- Chris Harris – backing vocals
- Matt Kaminski – backing vocals
- Jana King – backing vocals
- Kim Rogers – backing vocals
- John Wesley Ryles – backing vocals
- Lisa Silver – backing vocals
- Cindy Walker – backing vocals
- Dennis Wilson – backing vocals
- Ann Wright – backing vocals
- Curtis "Mr. Harmony" Young – backing vocals
- Waylon Jennings – vocals (8)

== Production ==
- Mark Wright – producer
- Warren Peterson – recording, overdub recording
- Robert Charles – overdub recording, second engineer
- Larry Jeffries – second engineer
- King Williams – second engineer
- Lynn Peterzell – mixing
- Mark Friego – second engineer
- Mark Hagen – second engineer
- Glenn Meadows – digital editing and mastering at Masterfonics (Nashville, Tennessee)
- Joe Johnston – production coordinator
- Simon Levy – art direction, design
- Keith Carter – photography
- Lucy Santamassino – hair, make-up
- The BDM Company – management

== Charts ==
=== Weekly charts ===
Chart (1994)	Peak position
US Billboard 200	98
US Top Country Albums (Billboard)	15

=== Year-end charts ===
Chart (1995)	Position
US Top Country Albums (Billboard)	56

== Certifications ==
Region	Certification	Certified units/sales
United States (RIAA)	Gold	500,000^{^}
^{^} Shipments figures based on certification alone.
