= Heard It in a Love Song (album) =

Studio album by Mark Chesnutt
- Released: September 5, 2006
- Genre: Country
- Length: 30:41
- Label: Vivaton!
- Producer: Mark Chesnutt; Jimmy Ritchey; Ralph Sall; Mark Wright

Mark Chesnutt chronology
Savin' the Honky Tonk (2004)	Heard It in a Love Song (2006)	Rollin' with the Flow (2008)

Professional ratings
Review scores
Source	Rating
Allmusic	link

Heard It in a Love Song is the twelfth studio album by American country music artist Mark Chesnutt. Its title track is a cover of The Marshall Tucker Band's single from 1977. Both it and "That Good That Bad" were released as singles, though neither charted. "A Hard Secret to Keep", originally found on Chesnutt's 2004 album Savin' the Honky Tonk, is reprised here. "Apartment #9" is a cover of a Tammy Wynette song, and "Dreaming My Dreams with You" a cover of the Waylon Jennings song.

== Track listing ==
1. "Heard It in a Love Song" (Toy Caldwell) - 4:07
2. "Dreaming My Dreams with You" (Allen Reynolds) - 3:59
3. "That Good That Bad" (Mark Chesnutt, Roger Springer, Clessie Lee Morrissette, Jr.) - 2:42
4. "A Hard Secret to Keep" (Jim McBride, Jerry Salley) - 3:19
5. "A Day in the Life of a Fool" (Eddie Noack) - 2:14
6. "You Can't Find Many Kissers" (Hank Williams, Jr.) - 2:36
7. "Apartment #9" (Johnny Paycheck, Bobby Austin) - 2:31
8. "A Shoulder to Cry On" (Merle Haggard) - 3:14
9. "Goodbye Comes Hard for Me" (Tommy Collins) - 3;15
10. "Lost Highway" (Leon Payne) - 2:44
