= I Just Wanted You to Know =

"I Just Wanted You To Know"

Single by Mark Chesnutt

from the album Almost Goodbye
- B-side: "April's Fool"
- Released: November 30, 1993
- Recorded: 1993
- Genre: Neotraditional country
- Length: 3:21
- Label: MCA
- Songwriters: Tim Mensy, Gary Harrison
- Producer: Mark Wright

Mark Chesnutt singles chronology
"Almost Goodbye" (1993)	"I Just Wanted You To Know" (1993)	"Woman, Sensuous Woman" (1994)

"I Just Wanted You to Know" is a song written by Tim Mensy and Gary Harrison and recorded by American country music singer Mark Chesnutt. It was released in November 1993 as the third single from his album Almost Goodbye. The song reached number-one on the U.S. Billboard Hot Country Singles & Tracks (now Hot Country Songs) chart and on the Canadian RPM Country Tracks chart.

== Content ==
"I Just Wanted You to Know" is an uptempo song accompanied by fiddle, electric guitar and steel guitar. It tells of a man who keeps thinking about a woman he loved. He calls the woman to talk to her, because he can't get over her.

== Chart performance ==
The song officially debuted at number 53 on the Hot Country Singles & Tracks chart dated December 18, 1993. It charted for 19 weeks on that chart, and reached Number One on the chart dated March 5, 1994. It remained there for one week, becoming Chesnutt's fifth Number One single, and his third consecutive Number One single from his Almost Goodbye album.

=== Charts ===
Chart (1993–1994)	Peak position
Canada Country Singles (RPM)	1
US Hot Country Songs (Billboard)	1

=== Year-end charts ===
Chart (1994)	Position
Canada Country Tracks (RPM)	53
US Country Songs (Billboard)	18
