= Let It Rain (Mark Chesnutt song) =

Single by Mark Chesnutt

from the album Greatest Hits
- B-side: "Goin' Through the Big D"
- Released: March 25, 1997
- Recorded: 1996
- Genre: Country
- Length: 3:01
- Label: Decca
- Songwriters: Mark Chesnutt, Roger Springer, Steve Leslie
- Producer: Tony Brown

Mark Chesnutt singles chronology
"It's a Little Too Late" (1996)	"Let It Rain" (1997)	"Thank God for Believers" (1997)

"Let It Rain" is a song co-written and recorded by American country music artist Mark Chesnutt. It was released in March 1997 as the second single from his Greatest Hits compilation album. The song reached number 8 on the U.S. Billboard Hot Country Singles & Tracks chart and peaked at number 16 on the Canadian RPM Country Tracks chart. It was written by Chesnutt, Roger Springer and Steve Leslie.

== Critical reception ==
Deborah Evans Price, of Billboard magazine reviewed the song favorably, saying that "from the gentle opening bars of the soft and pretty melody to the final hushed notes, this is a great song - definitely one of the best in Chesnutt's already highly distinguished career." She goes on to say that his performance is "superb, sweet, and loving - but never syrupy. The well crafted song also shows off his burning talents as a songwriter."

== Music video ==
The music video was directed by Michael McNamara and premiered in late 1996.

== Chart performance ==
"Let It Rain" debuted at number seventy-three on the U.S. Billboard Hot Country Singles & Tracks for the week of March 15, 1997.

Chart (1997)	Peak position
Canada Country Singles (RPM)	16
US Hot Country Songs (Billboard)	8

=== Year-end charts ===
Chart (1997)	Position
US Country Songs (Billboard)	73
