= Thank God for Believers (song) =

Single by Mark Chesnutt

from the album Thank God for Believers
- B-side: "Hello Honky Tonk"
- Released: July 15, 1997
- Recorded: 1996
- Genre: Country
- Length: 3:26
- Label: Decca
- Songwriters: Mark Alan Springer, Roger Springer, Tim Johnson
- Producer: Mark Wright

Mark Chesnutt singles chronology
"Let It Rain" (1997)	"Thank God for Believers" (1997)	"It's Not Over" (1997)

"Thank God for Believers" is a song co-written by Mark Alan Springer, Roger Springer and Tim Johnson and was recorded by the American country music singer Mark Chesnutt. It was released in July 1997 as the title track and first single from his album Thank God for Believers. It peaked at number 2 on the U.S. Billboard Hot Country Singles & Tracks chart and number 7 on the Canadian RPM Country Tracks chart.

== Content ==
The narrator describes his lover, who is a very spiritual woman. He tells the audience about her strong faith and how she always gives him second chances after all the hell he's put her through. He can't believe that his wife's faith in him remains so he thanks God for believers.

== Critical reception ==
Deborah Evans Price, of Billboard magazine reviewed the song favorably, saying that Chesnutt "wrings every drop of regret, pain, bewilderment, and appreciation from this great lyric..." She goes on to say that Chesnutt remains one of the "most affecting male vocalists on the country music landscape."

== Music video ==
The music video was directed by Richard Murray and premiered in late 1997. Country music singer-songwriter Ed Bruce appears as the old man in the video.

== Chart performance ==
"Thank God for Believers" debuted at number 69 on the U.S. Billboard Hot Country Singles & Tracks for the chart week of August 2, 1997.

Chart (1997)	Peak position
Canada Country Singles (RPM)	7
US Hot Country Songs (Billboard)	2

=== Year-end charts ===
Chart (1997)	Position
US Country Songs (Billboard)	66
