= Almost Goodbye =

Studio album by Mark Chesnutt
- Released: June 22, 1993
- Recorded: 1992–1993
- Studio: Javelina Studios and Woodland Sound Studios (Nashville, Tennessee)
- Genre: Honky-tonk; Western swing
- Length: 35:25
- Label: MCA
- Producer: Mark Wright

Mark Chesnutt chronology
Longnecks & Short Stories (1992)	Almost Goodbye (1993)	What a Way to Live (1994)

Singles from Almost Goodbye
- 1. "It Sure Is Monday" Released: May 18, 1993; 2. "Almost Goodbye" Released: August 30, 1993; 3. "I Just Wanted You to Know" Released: November 30, 1993; 4. "Woman (Sensuous Woman)" Released: March 22, 1994

Professional ratings
Review scores
Source	Rating
Allmusic	3/5 stars
Entertainment Weekly	A−

Almost Goodbye is the fourth studio album by American country music artist Mark Chesnutt. His third album for MCA Records, it was also the third consecutive album to receive RIAA platinum certification in the United States. Four singles were released from this album, of which three — "It Sure Is Monday", "Almost Goodbye", and "I Just Wanted You to Know" — reached Number One on the Billboard Hot Country Songs charts. "Woman (Sensuous Woman)", a cover of the Don Gibson hit from 1972, served as the fourth single, and peaked at #21.

== Musical style and composition ==
Almost Goodbye has been described as a honky-tonk and Western swing album compared to the work of neotraditional country contemporary George Strait.

== Track listing ==
No.	Title	Writer(s)	Length
1.	"It Sure Is Monday"	Dennis Linde	2:56
2.	"Woman, Sensuous Woman"	Gary S. Paxton	3:12
3.	"Almost Goodbye"	Billy Livsey, Don Schlitz	4:09
4.	"I Just Wanted You to Know"	Tim Mensy, Gary Harrison	3:21
5.	"April's Fool"	Mark Chesnutt, Glenn Gordon, David Lott	5:03
6.	"Texas Is Bigger Than It Used to Be"	Mark Wright, Joe Johnston, Ronnie Rogers	4:08
7.	"My Heart's Too Broke (To Pay Attention)"	Lonnie Wilson, Kim Williams, Phil Barnhart	2:33
8.	"Vickie Vance Gotta Dance"	Wright, Bill Kenner	3:47
9.	"Till a Better Memory Comes Along"	Mensy, Gene Dobbins, Glenn Ray	2:58
10.	"The Will"	Jackson Leap	3:20

== Personnel ==
- Mark Chesnutt – lead vocals
- Steve Nathan – keyboards
- Hargus "Pig" Robbins – acoustic piano
- Matt Rollings – keyboards
- Wayne Toups – squeezebox
- Pat Flynn – acoustic guitar
- Glenn Gordon – acoustic guitar
- Brent Rowan – electric guitars
- Biff Watson – acoustic guitar
- Paul Franklin – steel guitar
- David Hungate – bass
- Bob Wray – bass
- Owen Hale – drums
- Paul Leim – drums
- Lynn Peterzell – percussion
- Rob Hajacos – fiddle
- Nashville String Machine – strings
- Bergen White – string arrangements, backing vocals
- Carl Gorodetzky – string conductor
- Thom Flora – backing vocals
- Christopher Harris – backing vocals
- Jana King – backing vocals
- John Wesley Ryles – backing vocals
- Lisa Silver – backing vocals
- Bergen White – backing vocals
- Dennis Wilson – backing vocals
- Curtis Young – backing vocals

Production

- Jimmy Gilmer – executive producer
- Mark Wright – producer
- Warren Peterson – recording
- Robert Charles – overdub recording, second engineer
- Larry Jeffries – second engineer
- Lynn Peterzell – mixing
- Mark Friego – mix assistant
- Mark Hagen – mix assistant
- Glenn Meadows – digital editing and mastering at Masterfonics (Nashville, Tennessee)
- Joe Johnston – production coordinator
- Jim Kemp – art direction
- Carmelo Roman – art direction, design
- Keith Carter – photography
- Breon Reynolds – make-up
- BDM Company – management

== Charts ==
=== Weekly charts ===
Chart (1993)	Peak position
Canadian Country Albums (RPM)	7
US Billboard 200	43
US Top Country Albums (Billboard)	6

=== Year-end charts ===
Chart (1993)	Position
US Top Country Albums (Billboard)	43
Chart (1994)	Position
US Top Country Albums (Billboard)	32
