= It Wouldn't Hurt to Have Wings =

Single by Mark Chesnutt

from the album Wings
- B-side: "I May Be a Fool"
- Released: December 18, 1995
- Genre: Country
- Length: 3:13
- Label: Decca
- Songwriters: Jerry Foster, Roger Lavoie, Johnny Morris
- Producer: Tony Brown

Mark Chesnutt singles chronology
"Trouble" (1995)	"It Wouldn't Hurt to Have Wings" (1995)	"Wrong Place, Wrong Time" (1996)

"It Wouldn't Hurt to Have Wings" is a song written by Jerry Foster, Roger Lavoie and Johnny Morris, and recorded by American country music artist Mark Chesnutt. It was released in December 1995 as the second single from the album Wings. The song reached number 7 on the U.S. Billboard Hot Country Singles & Tracks chart and number 4 on the Canadian RPM Country Tracks chart.

== Critical reception ==
Deborah Evans Price, of Billboard magazine reviewed the song favorably, stating that Chesnutt "makes the trials of heartbreak sound survivable in this fiddle-laced tune that eloquently expresses, 'They say time can fly like a magical thing, but it sure wouldn't hurt to have wings.'"

== Chart performance ==
"It Wouldn't Hurt to Have Wings" debuted at number 60 on the U.S. Billboard Hot Country Singles & Tracks for the week of December 30, 1995.

Chart (1995–1996)	Peak position
Canada Country Singles (RPM)	4
US Hot Country Songs (Billboard)	7

=== Year-end charts ===
Chart (1996)	Position
Canada Country Tracks (RPM)	82
US Country Songs (Billboard)	42
