= Trouble (Todd Snider song) =

Single by Mark Chesnutt

from the album Wings
- B-side: "Strangers"
- Released: September 12, 1995
- Recorded: 1995
- Genre: Country
- Length: 3:34
- Label: Decca
- Songwriter: Todd Snider
- Producer: Tony Brown

Mark Chesnutt singles chronology
"Down in Tennessee" (1995)	"Trouble" (1995)	"It Wouldn't Hurt to Have Wings" (1995)

"Trouble" is a song written by Todd Snider and included on his 1994 debut album Songs for the Daily Planet. The song was subsequently recorded by American country music artist Mark Chesnutt and released in September 1995 as the first single from his album Wings. Chesnutt's version reached number 18 on the Billboard Hot Country Singles & Tracks chart.

== Music video ==
The music video was directed by Sherman Halsey and premiered in September 1995.

== Chart performance ==
"Trouble" debuted at number 57 on the U.S. Billboard Hot Country Singles & Tracks for the week of September 23, 1995.

Chart (1995)	Peak position
Canada Country Singles (RPM)	19
US Hot Country Songs (Billboard)	18
