= It's Not Over (Vern Gosdin song) =

Single by Mark Chesnutt with Alison Krauss and Vince Gill

from the album Thank God for Believers
- B-side: "Useless"
- Released: December 1997
- Genre: Country
- Length: 3:18
- Label: Decca
- Songwriters: Mark Wright; Larry Kingston
- Producer: Mark Wright

Mark Chesnutt singles chronology
"Thank God for Believers" (1997)	"It's Not Over" (1997)	"I Might Even Quit Lovin' You" (1998)

"It's Not Over" is a song written by Mark Wright and Larry Kingston, and recorded by American country music singer Mark Chesnutt. Originally found on his 1992 album Longnecks & Short Stories, the song was also included on his 1997 album Thank God for Believers,

== History ==
The song was originally recorded under the title "It's Not Over (If I'm Not Over You)" by Vern Gosdin and released on his 1982 album Passion. Reba McEntire also cut it in 1984 on her album My Kind of Country. Mark Chesnutt included his version of the song on his 1992 album Longnecks & Short Stories, but did not release it as a single at the time. His rendition of the song features backing vocals from Vince Gill and Alison Krauss.

Five years later, he put the original version on his 1997 album Thank God for Believers. Chesnutt chose to put the song on the album in order to replace a song that he felt did not fit thematically with the rest of the album. Regarding its placement on the album, he said that "When we put it up against the other songs, you would never know it was recorded so long ago." He also chose to make it a single because he "always thought that song had a place on radio".

== Critical reception ==
A review from Billboard was favorable, praising Chesnutt's "heartbroken hillbilly delivery", the presence of steel guitar and fiddle in the production, and the harmony vocals.

== Personnel ==
From Thank God for Believers liner notes.

- Pat Flynn - acoustic guitar
- Paul Franklin - steel guitar
- Vince Gill - background vocals
- Rob Hajacos - fiddle
- Alison Krauss - background vocals
- Paul Leim - drums
- Hargus "Pig" Robbins - piano
- Brent Rowan - electric guitar
- Biff Watson - acoustic guitar
- Bob Wray - bass guitar

== Chart performance ==
The song was the "Hot Shot Debut", meaning the highest-debuting song of the week, on the Hot Country Songs chart published for December 13, 1997, where it entered at No. 53.

Chart (1997–1998)	Peak position
US Hot Country Songs (Billboard)	34
