= Woman (Sensuous Woman) =

1972 Don Gibson song

Single by Don Gibson

from the album Woman (Sensuous Woman)
- B-side: "If You Want Me To I'll Go"
- Released: June 1972
- Recorded: April 11, 1972
- Studio: Acuff-Rose Sound Studio, Nashville, Tennessee
- Genre: Country
- Length: 3:16
- Label: Hickory 1638
- Songwriter: Gary S. Paxton
- Producer: Wesley Rose

Don Gibson singles chronology
"Far, Far Away" (1972)	"Woman (Sensuous Woman)" (1972)	"Is This the Best I'm Gonna Feel" (1972)

"Woman, Sensuous Woman"

Single by Mark Chesnutt

from the album Almost Goodbye
- B-side: "Til a Better Memory Comes Along
- Released: March 22, 1994
- Recorded: 1993
- Genre: Country
- Length: 3:12
- Label: MCA
- Songwriter: Gary S. Paxton
- Producer: Mark Wright

Mark Chesnutt singles chronology
"I Just Wanted You to Know" (1993)	"Woman, Sensuous Woman" (1994)	"She Dreams" (1994)

"Woman (Sensuous Woman)" is a 1972 single by Don Gibson. "Woman (Sensuous Woman)" was Don Gibson's final number one on the country charts spending one week at the top and a total of sixteen weeks on the charts. Other artists released their versions of "Woman (Sensuous Woman)," including Ray Charles on his 1984 album "Do I Ever Cross Your Mind," and Mark Chesnutt, whose version under the title "Woman, Sensuous Woman" peaked at #21 in the Country Music charts.

== Charts ==
=== Don Gibson version ===
Chart (1972)	Peak position
US Hot Country Songs (Billboard)	1
Canadian RPM Country Tracks	1

=== Mark Chesnutt version ===
Chart (1994)	Peak position
Canada Country Singles (RPM)	14
US Hot Country Songs (Billboard)	21
