= Down in Tennessee =

1985 country music single

Single by John Anderson

from the album Tokyo, Oklahoma
- B-side: "I've Got Me a Woman"
- Released: November 4, 1985
- Genre: Country
- Length: 3:23
- Label: Warner Bros. Nashville
- Songwriter: Wayland Holyfield
- Producers: John Anderson; Lou Bradley; Jim Ed Norman

John Anderson singles chronology
"Tokyo, Oklahoma" (1985)	"Down in Tennessee" (1985)	"You Can't Keep a Good Memory Down" (1986)

"Down in Tennessee" is a song written by Wayland Holyfield and recorded by American country music artist John Anderson. It was released in November 1985 as the second single from the album Tokyo, Oklahoma. The song reached number 12 on the Billboard Hot Country Singles & Tracks chart.

== Critical reception ==
Kip Kirby, of Billboard magazine reviewed the song favorably, saying that "the heartsick blues are well handled here by an artist who sings ballads with tears in every syllable."

== Chart performance ==
Chart (1985–1986)	Peak position
US Hot Country Songs (Billboard)	12
Canadian RPM Country Tracks	35

== Mark Chesnutt version ==
"Down in Tennessee"

Single by Mark Chesnutt

from the album What a Way to Live
- B-side: "This Side of the Door"
- Released: June 12, 1995
- Genre: Country
- Length: 3:21
- Label: Decca
- Songwriter: Wayland Holyfield
- Producer: Mark Wright

Mark Chesnutt singles chronology
"Gonna Get a Life" (1995)	"Down in Tennessee" (1995)	"Trouble" (1995)

"Down in Tennessee" was also recorded by American country music artist Mark Chesnutt. It was released in June 1995 as the fourth single from the album What a Way to Live. The song reached number 23 on the Billboard Hot Country Singles & Tracks chart. It also peaked at number 7 on the Canadian RPM Country Tracks chart.

=== Critical reception ===
Deborah Evans Price, of Billboard magazine reviewed the song favorably, saying that Chesnutt's version is "just as compelling on this powerful ballad of a man dealing with lost love." She goes on to say that Chesnutt "makes you feel like hurting right along with him."

=== Chart performance ===
"Down in Tennessee" debuted at number 66 on the U.S. Billboard Hot Country Singles & Tracks for the week of June 17, 1995.

Chart (1995)	Peak position
Canada Country Singles (RPM)	7
US Hot Country Songs (Billboard)	23
