= It's a Little Too Late (Mark Chesnutt song) =

Single by Mark Chesnutt

from the album Greatest Hits
- B-side: "The King of Broken Hearts"
- Released: September 30, 1996
- Recorded: 1996
- Genre: Country
- Length: 2:43
- Label: Decca Nashville
- Songwriters: Mark Chesnutt, Roger Springer, Slugger Morrissette
- Producer: Tony Brown

Mark Chesnutt singles chronology
"Wrong Place, Wrong Time" (1996)	"It's a Little Too Late" (1996)	"Let It Rain" (1997)

"It's a Little Too Late" is a song co-written and recorded by American country music singer Mark Chesnutt. It was released in September 1996 as the lead single from his Greatest Hits compilation album. The song reached number-one on the U.S. Billboard Hot Country Singles & Tracks chart and peaked at number 5 on the Canadian RPM Country Tracks chart. The song was written by Chesnutt, Roger Springer and Slugger Morrissette.

== Content ==
The song describes a narrator whose lover had recently walked out on him, wanting him to be a better man. The narrator keeps stating in his mind that he should have been there for her when she needed him: "I should've done this and I should've done that / I should've been there then she'd have never left / I should've been hangin' on to every word she ever had to say / But it's a little too late, she's a little too gone / She's a little too right, I'm a little too wrong / Now would be a good time to change / But it's a little too late."

In the second verse, the narrator states coming home late, and rather than being angry at him, his lover leaves him.

== Critical reception ==
Deborah Evans Price, of Billboard magazine reviewed the song favorably, saying that the song "demonstrates that he can deliver the driving tempo records country radio seems to favor these days without sacrificing any of the traditional country flavor of the music."

== Music video ==
The music video was directed by Richard Murray. It begins with a moving van pulling into the driveway of a house. Two guys hop out of the truck, and then, we see a man watching Claude "Fish" Fishburne hosting Go Fish on TNN. A woman then bangs a pair of cymbals to start the song. After we see the two guys moving a sofa into the house, Mark starts singing and playing guitar. The woman tries to interrupt the narrator from watching Go Fish on TNN. The movers then start packing everything out of the house, including the sofa that the narrator was sitting on, and the TV. The woman then gives her husband a fish and a rod, and he enjoys it, then goes to thank the movers for everything. After the moving van leaves, it starts to rain on the narrator.

== Chart performance ==
This song was Chesnutt's seventh Billboard Number One country single. It entered the Hot Country Singles & Tracks chart at number 63 on the chart dated October 5, 1996, and climbed to Number One in its eighteenth chart week on the chart dated February 8, 1997, where it held the top spot for two weeks.

Chart (1996–1997)	Peak position
Canada Country Singles (RPM)	5
US Hot Country Songs (Billboard)	1

=== Year-end charts ===
Chart (1997)	Position
Canada Country Tracks (RPM)	92
US Country Songs (Billboard)	53
