= Wrong Place, Wrong Time =

Single by Mark Chesnutt

from the album Wings
- B-side: "As the Honky Tonk Turns"
- Released: May 4, 1996
- Genre: Country
- Length: 3:33
- Label: Decca
- Songwriters: Scott Miller, Jimmy Alan Stewart
- Producer: Tony Brown

Mark Chesnutt singles chronology
| "It Wouldn't Hurt to Have Wings" (1996) | "Wrong Place, Wrong Time" (1996) | "It's a Little Too Late" (1996) |

"Wrong Place, Wrong Time" is a song written by Scott Miller and Jimmy Alan Stewart, and recorded by American country music artist Mark Chesnutt. It was released in May 1996 as the third single from the album Wings. The song reached #37 on the Billboard Hot Country Singles & Tracks chart.

== Content ==
The song chronicles two men who go out together one night, but undergo experiences that they declare put them in the "wrong place, wrong time".

== Critical reception ==
A review in Billboard praised the use of piano and harmonica in the production, along with Chesnutt's vocal performance.

== Chart performance ==
| Chart (1996) | Peak position |
|---|---|
| Canada Country Singles (RPM) | 13 |
| US Hot Country Songs (Billboard) | 37 |
