= Rollin' with the Flow =

1977 single by Charlie Rich

Single by Charlie Rich

from the album Rollin' with the Flow
- B-side: "To Sing a Love Song"
- Released: May 1977
- Recorded: April 1977
- Genre: Country
- Length: 2:43
- Label: Epic 50392
- Songwriter: Jerry Hayes
- Producer: Billy Sherrill

Charlie Rich singles chronology
"My Mountain Dew" (1977)	"Rollin' with the Flow" (1977)	"Beautiful Woman" (1978)

"Rollin' with the Flow" is a song first released by American country music artist T.G. Sheppard, in 1974 on the B-side of a single and in 1975 on his debut album T.G. Sheppard. It is better known for a version released by Charlie Rich in 1977. The Rich single was his eighth Number One on the U.S. Billboard Hot Country Singles charts. "Rollin' with the Flow" also crossed over into the top-40 of the adult contemporary music charts and narrowly missed the Billboard Hot 100, peaking at number 101 on the Bubbling Under the Hot 100 chart. The song returned to the country music charts in 2008, with a version by Mark Chesnutt reaching number 25 on the Billboard Hot Country Songs chart.

== Content ==
The mid-tempo song is sung from the perspective of a man who, despite being at an age when most of his peers have started raising families (at least 30 years old according to the second line), still lives a hard-partying, rock-and-roll lifestyle more in tune with far younger men. The song also makes reference to his Christian faith, noting that he knows he cannot continue like this in heaven (thus why he does it while he is still alive) and that he will eventually be forgiven, not just by Jesus, but his "crazy friends" as well.

== Charts ==
=== Weekly charts ===
Chart (1977)	Peak position
Australia (Kent Music Report)	47
US Hot Country Songs (Billboard)	1
US Bubbling Under Hot 100 (Billboard)	1
US Adult Contemporary (Billboard)	32
Canadian RPM Country Tracks	1
Canadian RPM Top Singles	100
Canadian RPM Adult Contemporary Tracks	35

=== Year-end charts ===
Chart (1977)	Position
US Hot Country Songs (Billboard)	6

== Mark Chesnutt version ==
"Rollin' with the Flow"

Single by Mark Chesnutt

from the album Rollin' with the Flow
- Released: August 2007
- Genre: Country
- Length: 2:47
- Label: Lofton Creek
- Songwriter: Jerry Hayes
- Producer: Jimmy Ritchey

Mark Chesnutt singles chronology
"Heard It in a Love Song" (2007)	"Rollin' with the Flow" (2007)	"When You Love Her Like Crazy" (2008)

In 2007, country music artist Mark Chesnutt recorded the song as the title track for an album. It was released on June 24, 2008. Chesnutt's version became his first Top 40 hit since "I'm a Saint" in late 2004-early 2005, peaking at number 25.

=== Chart performance ===
Chart (2007–2008)	Peak position
US Hot Country Songs (Billboard)	25

== Kurt Vile version ==
American indie rock artist Kurt Vile covered the song on his 2018 album, Bottle It In.
