= She Was =

Single by Mark Chesnutt

from the album Mark Chesnutt
- Released: February 4, 2002
- Recorded: January 2002
- Genre: Country
- Length: 3:21
- Label: Columbia
- Songwriters: Jimmy Melton; Neal Coty
- Producer: Billy Joe Walker Jr.

Mark Chesnutt singles chronology
"Lost in the Feeling" (2000)	"She Was" (2002)	"I Want My Baby Back" (2002)

"She Was" is a song written by Jimmy Melton and Neal Coty, and recorded by American country music singer Mark Chesnutt. It was released in February 2002 as the lead-off single from his self-titled album. It peaked at number 11 on the United States country music charts, and number 62 on the U.S. Billboard Hot 100 chart.

== Content ==
The song describes a girl who is asked if she's sure that her lover is the one, and she was. It then describes the life of the same woman who knew what she wanted and did it. Throughout the song, it is revealed that the narrator is a child of the mother.

== Music video ==
The music video was directed by Eric Welch and premiered in early 2002. It is Chesnutt's last music video to date.

== Cover versions ==
The song was later recorded by Joe Nichols on his 2022 album Good Day for Living.

== Chart performance ==
"She Was" debuted at number 51 on the U.S. Billboard Hot Country Singles & Tracks for the chart week of February 9, 2002. This was Chesnutt's final top twenty hit.

Chart (2002)	Peak position
US Hot Country Songs (Billboard)	11
US Billboard Hot 100	62

=== Year-end charts ===
Chart (2002)	Position
US Country Songs (Billboard)	46
