= Old Flames Have New Names =

Single by Mark Chesnutt

from the album Longnecks & Short Stories
- B-side: "Postpone the Pain"
- Released: February 1992
- Recorded: 1991
- Genre: Country
- Length: 2:24
- Label: MCA
- Songwriters: Bobby Braddock, Rafe Van Hoy
- Producer: Mark Wright

Mark Chesnutt singles chronology
"Broken Promise Land" (1991)	"Old Flames Have New Names" (1992)	"I'll Think of Something" (1992)

"Old Flames Have New Names" is a song written by Bobby Braddock and Rafe Van Hoy, and recorded by American country music singer Mark Chesnutt. It was released in February 1992 and is one of his most well known songs. It was the leading single from Chesnutt's second album Longnecks & Short Stories.

== Background ==
Braddock and Van Hoy wrote the song over the telephone in an attempt to create something along the lines of George Strait's 1987 country single "All My Ex's Live in Texas". They initially titled the song "Old Flames With New Names". Mark Wright, who would produce Chesnutt's record, suggested the change to "Old Flames Have New Names".

== Content ==
The protagonist — an apparent self-described "ladies' man" — moves back to his hometown after a two-year absence, hoping to resume his wild, womanizing ways with women he found desirable. But instead of receiving a grand homecoming and a night of carousing and sex, he finds out some hard truths: that all of his former love interests have moved on with their lives and settled down.

Several of the protagonist's old flames are married, two are expectant mothers and another has taken up vows of sisterhood. Upon finding out these things about his former girlfriends, he bemoans that now they don't want anything to do with him, since "I'm just a bad reminder of their wild and wooly days."

== Chart performance ==
=== Weekly charts ===
Chart (1992)	Peak position
Canada Country Singles (RPM)	4
US Hot Country Songs (Billboard)	5

=== Year-end charts ===
Chart (1992)	Position
Canada Country Tracks (RPM)	77
US Country Songs (Billboard)	33
