= Mark Chesnutt (album) =

Studio album by Mark Chesnutt
- Released: May 21, 2002
- Studio: Emerald Entertainment, Our Place Studios and OmniSound Studios (Nashville, Tennessee)
- Genre: Country
- Length: 35:44
- Label: Columbia Nashville
- Producer: Billy Joe Walker Jr.

Mark Chesnutt chronology
Lost in the Feeling (2000)	Mark Chesnutt (2002)	Savin' the Honky Tonk (2004)

Singles from Mark Chestnutt
- 1. "She Was" Released: February 4, 2002

Professional ratings
Review scores
Source	Rating
Allmusic	3/5 stars

Mark Chesnutt is the tenth studio album by American country music artist Mark Chesnutt. His only album for the Columbia Records Nashville label, it features the singles "She Was", "I Want My Baby Back" and "I'm in Love with a Married Woman", which peaked at #11, #47, and #48, respectively, on the Billboard Hot Country Songs charts. "I'm in Love with a Married Woman" was later recorded by Blaine Larsen on his 2006 album Rockin' You Tonight.

== Track listing ==
No.	Title	Writer(s)	Length
1.	"Don't Know Why I Do It"	Mark Nesler, Tony Martin	2:48
2.	"She Was"	Jimmy Melton, Neal Coty	3:21
3.	"Sacred as a Sunday"	Zack Turner, Kim Williams, Lonnie Wilson	3:13
4.	"I'm in Love with a Married Woman"	Marc Beeson, Tim Johnson	3:28
5.	"Population Minus One"	Neil Thrasher, Wendell Mobley, Kent Blazy	3:24
6.	"You'd Be Wrong"	Nesler, Martin	3:03
7.	"I Want My Baby Back"	Nesler, Martin, Tom Shapiro	3:58
8.	"Just Right for You"	Nesler, Martin	3:07
9.	"My Dreams"	Chris DuBois, Lee Thomas Miller	3:10
10.	"I Drew Me"	Casey Beathard, Dean Dillon	2:44
11.	"Good Night to Be Lonely"	Michael Dulaney, Jason Sellers	3:28
Total length:			35:44

== Personnel ==
- Mark Chesnutt – lead vocals
- John Hobbs – keyboards, acoustic piano
- John Barlow Jarvis – keyboards, acoustic piano
- J.T. Corenflos – electric guitar
- B. James Lowry – acoustic guitar
- Brent Mason – electric guitar
- Billy Panda – acoustic guitar
- Billy Joe Walker Jr. – electric guitar
- Reggie Young – electric guitar
- Dan Dugmore – steel guitar
- Paul Franklin - steel guitar
- Robby Turner – steel guitar
- Russ Pahl – banjo
- Mike Brignardello – bass
- Glenn Worf – bass
- Eddie Bayers – drums
- Paul Leim – drums
- Eric Darken – percussion
- Larry Franklin – fiddle, mandolin
- Aubrey Haynie – fiddle
- Hank Singer – fiddle
- Andrea Zonn – fiddle, backing vocals
- Michael Black – backing vocals
- Wes Hightower – backing vocals
- Liana Manis – backing vocals
- Louis Dean Nunley – backing vocals
- John Wesley Ryles – backing vocals
- Russell Terrell – backing vocals
- Neil Thrasher – backing vocals
- Ray Walker – backing vocals
- Curtis Young – backing vocals

Production

- Cliff Audretch Jr. – A&R direction
- Anthony S. Martin – A&R direction
- Billy Joe Walker Jr. – producer
- Steve Tillisch – recording
- Ed Seay – mixing
- Eric Bickel – recording assistant
- Jason Lefan – recording assistant
- Sean Neff – mix assistant
- Hank Williams – mastering at MasterMix (Nashville, Tennessee)
- Michael Hiatt – A&R coordinator
- Kay Smith – A&R coordinator
- Jessie Noble – production coordinator
- Ginny Johnson Walker – production assistant
- Tracy Baskette-Fleaner – art direction, design
- Deb Haus – art direction, artist development
- Russ Harrington – photography
- Vicki Russell – creative production

== Chart performance ==
Chart (2002)	Peak position
U.S. Billboard Top Country Albums	23
U.S. Billboard 200	184
