= She Dreams =

Single by Mark Chesnutt

from the album What a Way to Live
- B-side: "What a Way to Live"
- Released: July 12, 1994
- Recorded: 1994
- Genre: Country
- Length: 3:43
- Label: Decca
- Songwriters: Tim Mensy, Gary Harrison
- Producer: Mark Wright

Mark Chesnutt singles chronology
| "Woman, Sensuous Woman" (1994) | "She Dreams" (1994) | "Goin' Through the Big D" (1994) |

"She Dreams" is a song co-written by Tim Mensy and Gary Harrison. It was originally recorded by Mensy for his 1993 album This Ol' Heart (produced by James Stroud), from which it was released as the third and final single. It was also the final single release of his career. It was recorded by American country music artist Mark Chesnutt and released in July 1994 as the lead single from the album, What a Way to Live. It peaked at number 6 on the U.S. Billboard Hot Country Singles & Tracks chart and at number 7 on the Canadian RPM Country Tracks chart.

== Content ==
The song discusses a 30-year-old housewife who dreams of her husband being more affectionate towards her.

== Chart performance ==
"She Dreams" debuted at number 74 on the U.S. Billboard Hot Country Singles & Tracks for the week of March 6, 1993.

| Chart (1993) | Peak position |
|---|---|
| US Hot Country Songs (Billboard) | 74 |

== Mark Chesnutt version ==
One year later, Mark Chesnutt covered "She Dreams" on his album What a Way to Live. The song was the first release from the album, as well as his first release on the Decca Records label.

=== Critical reception ===
Mike Joyce of The Washington Post gave Chesnutt's version of the song a positive review, saying that Chesnutt "makes the most of sentimental balladry." Deborah Evans Price, of Billboard magazine reviewed the song favorably, saying that Chesnutt comes up with "one of his most fully realized vocal performances on this debut single for his new label." She goes on to say that "tasteful guitar and string arrangements help distinguish this song."

=== Chart performance ===
"She Dreams" debuted at number 64 on the U.S. Billboard Hot Country Singles & Tracks for the week of July 23, 1994.

| Chart (1994) | Peak position |
|---|---|
| Canada Country Singles (RPM) | 7 |
| US Hot Country Songs (Billboard) | 6 |

=== Year-end charts ===
| Chart (1994) | Position |
|---|---|
| Canada Country Tracks (RPM) | 89 |
| US Country Songs (Billboard) | 54 |
