= Savin' the Honky Tonk =

Studio album by Mark Chesnutt
- Released: September 21, 2004
- Studio: The Money Pit, Sound Kitchen and Loud Recording (Nashville, Tennessee); Fox Ridge Studios (Brentwood, Tennessee)
- Genre: Country
- Length: 49:29
- Label: Vivaton!
- Producer: Jimmy Ritchey

Mark Chesnutt chronology
Mark Chesnutt (2002)	Savin' the Honky Tonk (2004)	Heard It in a Love Song (2006)

Professional ratings
Review scores
Source	Rating
Allmusic	4.5/5 stars

Savin' the Honky Tonk is the eleventh studio album by American country music artist Mark Chesnutt. His first album for the Vivaton! label, it features the singles "The Lord Loves the Drinkin' Man", "I'm a Saint", and "A Hard Secret to Keep", which reached numbers 34, 33, and 59, respectively, on the Hot Country Songs charts.

Three of this album's tracks were previously recorded by other artists. "Beer, Bait, and Ammo" was originally recorded by its writer, Kevin Fowler, on his 2000 album of the same name, and later by Sammy Kershaw on his 2003 album I Want My Money Back. Fowler also recorded "The Lord Loves the Drinkin' Man" on his 2004 album Loose, Loud & Crazy. "Would These Arms Be in Your Way" was originally recorded by Keith Whitley on his 1988 album Don't Close Your Eyes.

The people pictured on the album cover include all of Chesnutt's road band and crew.

== Track listing ==
No.	Title	Writer(s)	Length
1.	"Somebody Save the Honky Tonks"	Mark Chesnutt, Bob Regan, Jimmy Ritchey	3:18
2.	"I'm a Saint"	Jason Sellers, Tony Martin, Ritchey	2:59
3.	"The Lord Loves the Drinkin' Man"	Kevin Fowler	4:03
4.	"Would These Arms Be in Your Way"	Vern Gosdin, Hank Cochran, Red Lane	3:11
5.	"You Can't Do Me This Way"	Roger Miller	2:20
6.	"A Hard Secret to Keep"	Jim McBride, Jerry Salley	3:22
7.	"What Are We Doing in Love"	Dean Miller	2:51
8.	"Don't Ruin It for the Rest of Us"	Annie Tate, Sam Tate, Georgia Middleman, Ritchey	3:54
9.	"Mama's House"	Neal Coty, Jimmy Melton	3:04
10.	"Since You Ain't Home"	Shawn Camp, Ken Mellons, Dale Dodson	3:54
11.	"Think Like a Woman"	Jim Collins, Mark Nesler, Martin	3:11
12.	"Then We Can All Go Home"	Regan, Ritchey	3:18
13.	"Beer, Bait and Ammo"	Fowler	4:15
14.	"My Best Drinkin'"	Collins, Chuck Jones, Ritchey	4:02
15.	"Honky Tonk Heroes"	Billy Joe Shaver	1:36

== Production ==
- Jimmy Ritchey – producer
- Clarke Schleicher – engineer, mixing
- Erik Hellerman – overdub recording, assistant engineer
- J.C. Monterrosa – assistant engineer
- Rich Hanson – mix assistant
- Bob Ludwig – mastering at Gateway Mastering Studios, Inc. (Portland, Maine)
- Mike "Frog" Griffith – production assistant
- Bill Tyler – art direction, design
- Russ Harrington – photography
- Suzy Kipp – stylist

== Personnel ==
As listed in liner notes.

- Mark Chesnutt – lead vocals
- John Barlow Jarvis – acoustic piano
- B. James Lowry – acoustic guitar
- Brent Mason – electric guitar
- Jimmy Ritchey – acoustic guitar, electric guitar, tic tac bass
- Paul Franklin –steel guitar, dobro
- Glenn Worf – bass
- Eddie Bayers – drums
- Larry Franklin – fiddle
- Wes Hightower – backing vocals
- John Wesley Ryles – backing vocals
- Lee Ann Womack – backing vocals on "Would These Arms Be in Your Way"

== Chart performance ==
Chart (2004)	Peak position
U.S. Billboard Top Country Albums	23
U.S. Billboard 200	70
U.S. Billboard Independent Albums	15
