= Gonna Get a Life =

Single by Mark Chesnutt

from the album What a Way to Live
- B-side: "Half of Everything (And All of My Heart)"
- Released: February 21, 1995
- Recorded: 1994
- Studio: Javelina (Nashville, Tennessee)
- Genre: Country
- Length: 3:43
- Label: Decca
- Songwriters: Jim Lauderdale, Frank Dycus
- Producer: Mark Wright

Mark Chesnutt singles chronology
"Goin' Through the Big D" (1994)	"Gonna Get a Life" (1995)	"Down in Tennessee" (1995)

"Gonna Get a Life" is a song written by Jim Lauderdale and Frank Dycus, and recorded by American country music singer Mark Chesnutt. It was released in February 1995 as the third single from his album What a Way to Live. The song became Chesnutt's sixth U.S. Country Music charts Number One in May of that year.

== Background and writing ==
Jim Lauderdale told Taste of Country that he was working at co-writer Frank Dycus' house that day and while taking a break he played a melody that he came up with. Dycus came up with the title and then wrote the rest of the lyrics.

== Critical reception ==
Billboard magazine reviewed the song favorably, calling it a "spicy mix of country and cajun."

== Music video ==
The music video was directed by Sherman Halsey and premiered in early 1995. It was filmed in Lafayette, Louisiana. It features Chesnutt performing the song in concert, in a treehouse, and at a cajun party surrounded by various people.

== Chart performance ==
"Gonna Get a Life" debuted at number 68 on the U.S. Billboard Hot Country Singles & Tracks for the week of February 25, 1995.

Chart (1995)	Peak position
Canada Country Singles (RPM)	2
US Hot Country Songs (Billboard)	1

=== Year-end charts ===
Chart (1995)	Position
Canada Country Tracks (RPM)	66
US Country Songs (Billboard)	22
