= Bubba Shot the Jukebox =

Single by Mark Chesnutt

from the album Longnecks & Short Stories
- B-side: "Blame It on Texas"
- Released: September 15, 1992
- Recorded: 1991
- Genre: Country
- Length: 3:05
- Label: MCA
- Songwriter: Dennis Linde
- Producer: Mark Wright

Mark Chesnutt singles chronology
"I'll Think of Something" (1992)	"Bubba Shot the Jukebox" (1992)	"Ol' Country" (1993)

"Bubba Shot the Jukebox" is a song written by Dennis Linde, and recorded by American country music singer Mark Chesnutt. It was released in September 1992 as the third single from his album Longnecks & Short Stories. It peaked at number 4 on the U.S. Billboard Hot Country Singles & Tracks chart and at number 14 on the Canadian RPM Country Tracks chart.

== Content ==
The song is an uptempo, in which a man named Bubba shoots a jukebox when he hears a song that makes him cry, which causes a scene. Bubba is taken to jail.

== Chart performance ==
"Bubba Shot the Jukebox" charted for several weeks prior to its release, due to several stations giving it unsolicited airplay while "I'll Think of Something" was Chesnutt's active single. A column in Billboard described the song as "not thought to be viable for radio by some in both Chesnutt's and MCA's camps", but that the unsolicited airplay made it "destined" to be a single.

Chart (1992)	Peak position
Canada Country Singles (RPM)	14
US Bubbling Under Hot 100 (Billboard)	21
US Hot Country Songs (Billboard)	4

== Certifications ==
Region	Certification	Certified units/sales
United States (RIAA)	Gold	500,000^{‡}
^{‡} Sales+streaming figures based on certification alone.
