= Longnecks & Short Stories =

Studio album by Mark Chesnutt
- Released: March 21, 1992
- Recorded: 1991
- Studio: Javelina Studios (Nashville, Tennessee)
- Genre: Neotraditional country
- Length: 32:33
- Label: MCA
- Producer: Mark Wright

Mark Chesnutt chronology
| Too Cold at Home (1990) | Longnecks & Short Stories (1992) | Almost Goodbye (1993) |

Singles from Longnecks & Short Stories
- 1. "Old Flames Have New Names" Released: February 1992; 2. "I'll Think of Something" Released: June 2, 1992; 3. "Bubba Shot the Jukebox" Released: September 15, 1992; 4. "Ol' Country" Released: January 4, 1993

Professional ratings
Review scores
| Source | Rating |
|---|---|
| Allmusic | link |
| Robert Christgau | (1-star Honorable Mention) |
| Entertainment Weekly | B link |

Longnecks & Short Stories is the third studio album by American country music artist Mark Chesnutt. It was released in 1992 on MCA Records, and like its predecessor Too Cold at Home, it was certified platinum in the United States for sales of one million copies. Four singles were released from this album, all of which were Top Ten hits on the Billboard Hot Country Songs charts: "Old Flames Have New Names" (#5), "I'll Think of Something" (#1), "Bubba Shot the Jukebox" and "Ol' Country" (both #4).

"I'll Think of Something" was originally a Top Ten country hit in 1974 for Hank Williams, Jr., who recorded it on his album Living Proof. In addition, "It's Not Over (If I'm Not over You)" was originally recorded by Vern Gosdin on his 1982 album Passion. Chesnutt later included the song on his 1997 album Thank God for Believers, releasing it as a single from that album in 1998. "Uptown, Downtown (Misery's All the Same)", was originally recorded by Ray Price, as a 1984 single known as "Better Class of Losers". "Who Will the Next Fool Be?" was originally recorded by its writer, Charlie Rich, as a single released in 1961.

== Track listing ==
| No. | Title | Writer(s) | Length |
|---|---|---|---|
| 1. | "Ol' Country" | Bobby Harden | 3:53 |
| 2. | "Old Flames Have New Names" | Bobby Braddock; Rafe Van Hoy | 2:24 |
| 3. | "I'll Think of Something" | Bill Rice; Jerry Foster | 4:13 |
| 4. | "It's Not Over" (featuring Vince Gill and Alison Krauss) | Larry Kingston; Mark Wright | 3:21 |
| 5. | "Uptown, Downtown (Misery's All the Same)" | Harlan Howard; Ron Peterson | 2:40 |
| 6. | "Bubba Shot the Jukebox" | Dennis Linde | 3:05 |
| 7. | "Postpone the Pain" | Gary Scruggs; Wright | 3:00 |
| 8. | "Talking to Hank" (duet with George Jones) | Harden | 2:47 |
| 9. | "I'm Not Getting Any Better at Goodbyes" | Steve Earle | 3:50 |
| 10. | "Who Will the Next Fool Be?" | Charlie Rich | 3:32 |
| Total length: | | | 32:33 |

== Personnel ==
Musicians

- Mark Chesnutt – vocals
- David Briggs – acoustic piano
- Steve Nathan – acoustic piano
- Hargus "Pig" Robbins – acoustic piano
- Wayne Toups – squeezebox, backing vocals
- Pat Flynn – acoustic guitar
- Brent Rowan – acoustic guitar, electric guitars
- Biff Watson – acoustic guitar
- Terry Crisp – steel guitar
- Paul Franklin – steel guitar
- Bob Wray – bass
- Owen Hale – drums
- Paul Leim – drums
- Lynn Peterzell – percussion
- Rob Hajacos – fiddle
- Nashville String Machine – strings
- Bergen White – string arrangements, backing vocals
- Carl Gorodetzky – string conductor
- Jana King – backing vocals
- Jim Lauderdale – backing vocals
- Keith Morris – backing vocals
- Wendy Suits Johnson – backing vocals
- Dennis Wilson – backing vocals
- Curtis "Mr. Harmony" Young – backing vocals
- Vince Gill – backing vocals (4)
- Alison Krauss – backing vocals (4)
- George Jones – vocals (8)

Production

- Jimmy Gilmer – executive producer
- Mark Wright – producer
- Warren Peterson – recording
- Lynn Peterzell – mixing
- Robert Charles – second engineer
- Larry Jefferies – second engineer
- Shaun Gallant London – second engineer
- Mike McCarthy – second engineer
- Milan Bogdan – digital editing
- Glenn Meadows – mastering
- Masterfonics (Nashville, Tennessee) – editing and mastering location
- Michael Grady – sequencing assistant
- Joe Johnston – production assistant
- Katherine DeVault – art direction, design
- Mike Rutherford – photography
- The BDM Company – management

== Chart performance ==
| Chart (1992) | Peak position |
|---|---|
| U.S. Billboard Top Country Albums | 9 |
| U.S. Billboard 200 | 68 |
| Canadian RPM Country Albums | 5 |
