= Ol' Country =

Single by Mark Chesnutt

from the album Longnecks & Short Stories
- B-side: "Talking to Hank"
- Released: January 4, 1993
- Recorded: 1992
- Genre: Country
- Length: 3:53
- Label: MCA
- Songwriter: Bobby Harden
- Producer: Mark Wright

Mark Chesnutt singles chronology
"Bubba Shot the Jukebox" (1992)	"Ol' Country" (1993)	"It Sure Is Monday" (1993)

"Ol' Country" is a song written by Bobby Harden and recorded by American country music singer Mark Chesnutt. It was released in January 1993 as the fourth and final single from his album: Longnecks & Short Stories. It peaked at number 4 on the U.S. Billboard Hot Country Singles & Tracks chart and at number 2 on the Canadian RPM Country Tracks chart.

== Content ==
The song tells the story of a country boy from Birmingham, Alabama and a city girl from Ohio who met each other by chance and fell in love.

== Music video ==
The music video was directed by John Lloyd Miller and premiered in early 1993.

== Chart performance ==
Chart (1993)	Peak position
Canada Country Singles (RPM)	2
US Hot Country Songs (Billboard)	4

=== Year-end charts ===
Chart (1993)	Position
Canada Country Tracks (RPM)	42
US Country Songs (Billboard)	63
