= Almost Goodbye (song) =

Single by Mark Chesnutt

from the album Almost Goodbye
- B-side: "Texas Is Bigger Than It Used to Be"
- Released: August 30, 1993
- Recorded: 1993
- Genre: Country
- Length: 4:09
- Label: MCA
- Songwriters: Billy Livsey; Don Schlitz
- Producer: Mark Wright

Mark Chesnutt singles chronology
"It Sure Is Monday" (1993)	"Almost Goodbye" (1993)	"I Just Wanted You to Know" (1993)

"Almost Goodbye" is a song written by Billy Livsey and Don Schlitz, and recorded by American country music singer Mark Chesnutt. It was released in August 1993 as the second single and title track from his 1993 album of the same name. The power ballad peaked at number-one on the U.S. Billboard Hot Country Singles & Tracks (now Hot Country Songs) chart and at number 2 on the Canadian RPM Country Tracks chart.

== Music video ==
The music video was directed by John Lloyd Miller and premiered in late 1993.

== Chart performance ==
The song debuted at number 68 on the Hot Country Singles & Tracks chart dated September 4, 1993. It charted for 20 weeks on that chart, and became his fourth Number One single on the chart dated November 20, 1993, holding the top spot for one week.

=== Charts ===
Chart (1993)	Peak position
Canada Country Singles (RPM)	2
US Hot Country Songs (Billboard)	1

=== Year-end charts ===
Chart (1993)	Position
Canada Country Tracks (RPM)	4
