= Goin' Through the Big D =

Single by Mark Chesnutt

from the album What a Way to Live
- B-side: "It's Almost Like You're Here"
- Released: October 18, 1994
- Recorded: 1994
- Genre: Country
- Length: 2:34
- Label: Decca
- Songwriters: Mark Wright; Ronnie Rogers; Jon Wright
- Producer: Mark Wright

Mark Chesnutt singles chronology
"She Dreams" (1994)	"Goin' Through the Big D" (1994)	"Gonna Get a Life" (1995)

"Goin' Through the Big D" is a song written by Mark Wright, John Wright and Ronnie Rogers, and recorded by American country music artist Mark Chesnutt. It was released in October 1994 as the second single from his album What a Way to Live. It peaked at number 2 on both the U.S. Billboard Hot Country Singles & Tracks chart and the RPM country tracks charts in Canada. It was later the b-side to his 1997 single "Let It Rain".

== Content ==
The song's main protagonist is going through a divorce and says that he is "goin' through the big D and don't mean Dallas". Early on, the young man muses about his wife getting almost everything in the divorce settlement, including the house, while he only gets their Jeep. The house serves as the focal point for the man's misery, until in the end he realizes that the house's mortgage is due and it has just two bedrooms – in essence, meaning he is relieved to have the marriage ended.

== Chart performance ==
"Goin' Through the Big D" debuted at number 58 on the U.S. Billboard Hot Country Singles & Tracks for the chart week of October 29, 1994.

Chart (1994–1995)	Peak position
Canada Country Singles (RPM)	2
US Hot Country Songs (Billboard)	2

=== Year-end charts ===
Chart (1995)	Position
Canada Country Tracks (RPM)	22
US Country Songs (Billboard)	57
