= I'll Think of Something =

1974 single by Hank Williams Jr.

Single by Hank Williams Jr.

from the album Living Proof
- B-side: "Country Music Lover"
- Released: June 24, 1974
- Genre: Country
- Length: 2:23
- Label: MGM
- Songwriters: Bill Rice, Jerry Foster
- Producer: Jim Vienneau

Hank Williams Jr. singles chronology
"Rainy Night in Georgia" (1974)	"I'll Think of Something" (1974)	"Angels Are Hard to Find" (1975)

"I'll Think of Something" is a song written by Bill Rice and Jerry Foster, which has been recorded by American country music singers Hank Williams Jr. and Mark Chesnutt. The song was also recorded by Loretta Lynn for her 1985 album Just a Woman.

== Hank Williams, Jr. version ==
Hank Williams Jr. was the first artist to record the song. His version was a number seven country hit and the first single from his 1974 album Living Proof.

=== Chart performance ===
Chart (1974)	Peak position
US Hot Country Songs (Billboard)	7
Canadian RPM Country Tracks	2

== Mark Chesnutt version ==
"I'll Think of Something"

Single by Mark Chesnutt

from the album Longnecks & Short Stories
- B-side: "Uptown, Downtown (Misery's All the Same)"
- Released: June 2, 1992
- Recorded: 1991
- Genre: Country
- Length: 4:13
- Label: MCA
- Songwriters: Bill Rice, Jerry Foster
- Producer: Mark Wright

Mark Chesnutt singles chronology
"Old Flames Have New Names" (1992)	"I'll Think of Something" (1992)	"Bubba Shot the Jukebox" (1992)

Chesnutt's version is the second single released from his 1992 album Longnecks & Short Stories. It peaked at number one in both the United States and Canadian Country music charts.

An earlier fade marks the difference between the version released for radio airplay and 7-inch single release, and the longer album version.

=== Music video ===
The music video was directed by John Lloyd Miller.

=== Chart performance ===
Chart (1992)	Peak position
Canada Country Singles (RPM)	1
US Hot Country Songs (Billboard)	1

=== Year-end charts ===
Chart (1992)	Position
Canada Country Tracks (RPM)	23
US Country Songs (Billboard)	11
