= Outlaw (Mark Chesnutt album) =

Studio album by Mark Chesnutt
- Released: June 22, 2010
- Studio: The Nest (Glendale, California)
- Genre: Country
- Length: 45:32
- Label: Saguaro Road
- Producer: Pete Anderson

Mark Chesnutt chronology
Rollin' with the Flow (2008)	Outlaw (2010)	Live from the Big D (2011)

Outlaw is the fourteenth studio album by American country music artist, Mark Chesnutt. It was released on June 22, 2010, via Saguaro Road Records.

== Background ==
Outlaw, unlike Chesnutt's previous work, is composed of covers of some 'Outlaw Classics'. The album includes material from Billy Joe Shaver, Willie Nelson, Kris Kristofferson and Waylon Jennings. Chesnutt said "When I was first approached to record this CD, my reaction wasn’t just ‘yes,’ but ‘hell, yeah. I cut my teeth on this kind of music, and it’s an opportunity [that might not have otherwise presented itself] for me to pay tribute to some of my biggest heroes in country music." Producer Pete Anderson commended Chesnutt on the work he did with the record by saying "Mark Chesnutt put on a vocal display like I’ve never before seen in the studio. He stood in front of the mic and sang the whole record, from beginning to end, flawlessly [and in less than three hours]. We are all amazed at the results. There may be singers out there as good as Mark, but there are none better and, at this point in my career, I am thrilled to have had the opportunity to work with this caliber of talent."

== Track listing ==
No.	Title	Writer(s)	Length
1.	"Black Rose"	Billy Joe Shaver	2:53
2.	"Whiskey Bent and Hell Bound"	Hank Williams, Jr.	3:14
3.	"Only Daddy That'll Walk the Line"	Jimmy Bryant	2:34
4.	"A Couple More Years" (duet with Amber Digby)	Dennis Locorriere, Shel Silverstein	4:43
5.	"Need a Little Time Off for Bad Behavior"	David Allan Coe, Bobby Keel, Larry Latimer	2:54
6.	"Sunday Mornin' Comin' Down"	Kris Kristofferson	4:49
7.	"Are You Ready for the Country"	Neil Young	2:31
8.	"Lovin' Her Was Easier (Than Anything I'll Ever Do Again)"	Kristofferson	4:10
9.	"Country State of Mind"	Roger Alan Wade, Williams, Jr.	3:54
10.	"Freedom to Stay"	Willis David Hoover	3:24
11.	"Bloody Mary Morning"	Willie Nelson	3:53
12.	"Desperados Waiting for a Train"	Guy Clark	6:33

== Personnel ==
- Mark Chesnutt – all vocals
- Michael Murphy – keyboards
- Dennis Gurwell – French accordion (3)
- Pete Anderson – acoustic guitars, electric guitars, slide guitar, bass guitar, drums, percussion, harmonica
- Gary Morse – pedal steel guitar
- Bob "Boo" Bernstein – pedal steel guitar solo (11)
- Chris Ross – drums
- Mickey Raphael – harmonica
- Donny Reed – fiddle
- Sara Watkins – fiddle solo (11)
- Amber Digby – vocals (4)

=== Production ===
- Mike Jason – executive producer
- Bas Hartong – A&R
- Pete Anderson – producer, arrangements
- Michael Murphy – associate producer
- Sam Davis – recording
- Doug Deveaux – additional recording
- Sally Browder – mixing
- Joseph M. Palmaccio – mastering at The Place...for Mastering (Nashville, Tennessee)
- Susan Winslow – project manager
- Ingwersen Design Company – design
- Joseph Anthony Baker – photography
- Terri Newton – hair, make-up
- Olivia Kim – editorial research
- Ladd Management – management

== Chart performance ==
Chart (2010)	Peak position
U.S. Billboard Top Country Albums	42
