= It Sure Is Monday =

Single by Mark Chesnutt

from the album Almost Goodbye
- B-side: "I'm Not Getting Any Better at Goodbyes"
- Released: May 18, 1993
- Recorded: 1993
- Genre: Country
- Length: 2:56
- Label: MCA
- Songwriter: Dennis Linde
- Producer: Mark Wright

Mark Chesnutt singles chronology
"Ol' Country" (1993)	"It Sure Is Monday" (1993)	"Almost Goodbye" (1993)

"It Sure Is Monday" is a song written by Dennis Linde and recorded by American country music artist Mark Chesnutt. It was released in May 1993 as the first single from his 1993 album Almost Goodbye. The song reached number-one on the U.S. Billboard Hot Country Singles & Tracks chart and on the Canadian RPM Country Tracks chart. It also peaked at number 19 on the U.S. Billboard Bubbling Under Hot 100 chart.

== Content ==
The song is uptempo. The narrator is a young man who is complaining that he has to get busy again seeing that the weekend has passed and that "it sure is Monday".

== Music video ==
The music video was directed by John Lloyd Miller and premiered in mid-1993.

== Chart performance ==
"It Sure Is Monday" debuted at number 65 on the U.S. Billboard Hot Country Singles & Tracks for the week of May 22, 1993.

Chart (1993)	Peak position
Canada Country Singles (RPM)	1
US Bubbling Under Hot 100 (Billboard)	19
US Hot Country Songs (Billboard)	1

=== Year-end charts ===
Chart (1993)	Position
Canada Country Tracks (RPM)	39
US Country Songs (Billboard)	8
