= Mark Chesnutt =

American country music singer (born 1963)

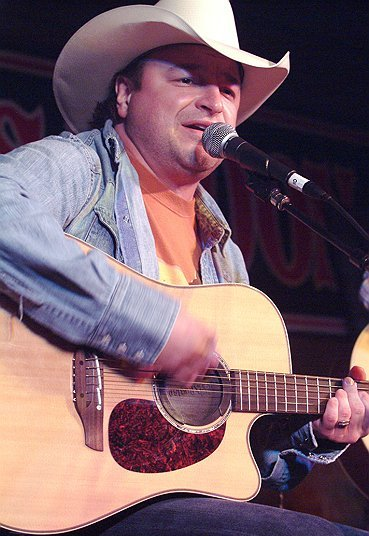
- Chesnutt performing in 2006

Background information
- Born: Mark Nelson Chesnutt; September 6, 1963 (age 63); Beaumont, Texas, United States
- Origin: Beaumont, Texas, U.S.
- Genres: Country (neotraditional); honky-tonk
- Occupations: Singer; songwriter
- Instruments: Vocals; acoustic guitar
- Years active: 1984–present
- Labels: Axbar; Cherry; MCA Nashville; Decca Nashville; Columbia Nashville; Vivaton!; CBuJ Entertainment; Lofton Creek; Saguaro Road; Nada Dinero
- Spouse: Tracie Motley (m. 1992)
- Website: Official site

Mark Nelson Chesnutt (born September 6, 1963) is an American country music singer and songwriter. Between 1990 and 1999, he had his greatest chart success recording for Universal Music Group Nashville's MCA and Decca branches, with a total of eight albums between those two labels. During this timespan, Chesnutt also charted twenty top-ten hits on the Billboard Hot Country Songs charts, of which eight reached number one: "Brother Jukebox", "I'll Think of Something", "It Sure Is Monday", "Almost Goodbye", "I Just Wanted You to Know", "Gonna Get a Life", "It's a Little Too Late", and a cover of Aerosmith's "I Don't Want to Miss a Thing". His first three albums for MCA (Too Cold at Home, Longnecks & Short Stories, and Almost Goodbye) along with a 1996 Greatest Hits package issued on Decca are all certified platinum by the Recording Industry Association of America (RIAA); 1994's What a Way to Live, also issued on Decca, is certified gold. After a self-titled album in 2002 on Columbia Records, Chesnutt has continued to record predominantly on independent labels.

Chesnutt is known for his neotraditionalist country and honky-tonk influences, with frequent stylistic comparisons to George Jones. He has recorded several cover songs as both singles and album cuts, including covers of Hank Williams Jr., John Anderson, Don Gibson, Conway Twitty, and Charlie Rich. Artists with whom he has collaborated include Jones, Tracy Byrd, Vince Gill, and Alison Krauss. Mark Wright produced all but one of his albums released in the 1990s, while his work since 2005 has been produced by Jimmy Ritchey. Chesnutt has also won two awards from the Country Music Association: the Horizon Award (now known as Best New Artist) and Vocal Event of the Year, both in 1993.

== Biography ==
Mark Nelson Chesnutt was born on September 6, 1963, in Beaumont, Texas. He drew musical influence from his father, Bob Chesnutt, who was a singer and record collector. Chesnutt first played drums as a child after receiving a drum kit as a Christmas gift, but at his father's persuasion, he stopped playing drums and chose to focus on singing instead. He dropped out of school in the eleventh grade to play in clubs around southeast Texas. When he turned 17, his father took him to Nashville, Tennessee to begin recording. For the next ten years, he recorded on small regional labels while playing in the house band for local Beaumont nightclub Cutters. By the late 1980s, he had released eight singles, which would later be released together as an album titled Doing My Country Thing. Record producer Tony Brown heard one of Chesnutt's independent releases and recommended him to Mark Wright, a songwriter, session musician, and record producer who helped Chesnutt sign with the Nashville branch of MCA Records in 1990. The same year, Bob Chesnutt died of a heart attack.

== Musical career ==
=== Too Cold at Home ===
Chesnutt released his major-label debut Too Cold at Home in 1990. It accounted for five chart singles on the Billboard Hot Country Singles & Tracks (now Hot Country Songs) charts. The first was "Too Cold at Home", written by Bobby Harden of The Harden Trio. This song reached a peak of number three on Billboard, while reaching number one on the country music charts published by Radio & Records, Gavin Report, and Cashbox. The second single was "Brother Jukebox", which was written by Paul Craft, originally released as a single by Don Everly of The Everly Brothers in 1977, and also recorded by Keith Whitley on his 1989 album I Wonder Do You Think of Me. Chesnutt's rendition of the song became his first number-one single on Hot Country Songs in 1991, while "Blame It on Texas", "Your Love Is a Miracle", and "Broken Promise Land" all peaked within the top ten of the same chart by year's end. "Broken Promise Land" was previously released by Waylon Jennings in 1986. Contributing musicians to Too Cold at Home included Richard Bennett, David Briggs, Mark O'Connor, Hargus "Pig" Robbins, Matt Rollings, Brent Rowan, and Glenn Worf. Wright produced the album and provided background vocals on some tracks. He also wrote or co-wrote five of its ten tracks including both "Blame It on Texas" and "Your Love Is a Miracle". Also included on the album was Chesnutt's rendition of "Friends in Low Places", which was released as a single in late 1990 by Garth Brooks.

Too Cold at Home was met with generally positive critical and commercial reception. Alanna Nash of Entertainment Weekly praised Chesnutt's singing voice and honky-tonk style, but felt that the album had too many cover songs. Brian Mansfield of AllMusic compared the album's sound to Western swing and George Jones. In 1994, Too Cold at Home earned a platinum certification from the Recording Industry Association of America (RIAA) for U.S. shipments of one million copies. In addition, the Country Music Association nominated him for the 1991 Horizon Award (now known as Best New Artist).

=== Longnecks & Short Stories ===
Chesnutt's second album, 1992's Longnecks & Short Stories, also earned a platinum certification. In order of release, its singles were "Old Flames Have New Names", "I'll Think of Something", "Bubba Shot the Jukebox", and "Ol' Country" (also written by Harden). "I'll Think of Something", previously a single for Hank Williams Jr. in 1974, became Chesnutt's second number-one single on Billboard in 1992. The other three singles all made top ten on Billboard. The album included many of the same session musicians as its predecessor, along with guest vocals from George Jones on "Talkin' to Hank", and both Alison Krauss and Vince Gill on "It's Not Over". The latter was originally recorded by Reba McEntire, while the closing track "Who Will the Next Fool Be?" was originally recorded by Charlie Rich. Chesnutt noted in a 1992 news article in The Tennessean that he was pleased to have recorded a duet with Jones, whom he considered a musical idol. He also noted that "Bubba Shot the Jukebox" (written by Dennis Linde) had been serviced "as a joke" by Nashville song promoters and was not taken seriously by other artists, but he felt that the song had potential. The song was not originally intended to be a single, but was selected as one after a number of stations on the Billboard survey played the song frequently enough for it to enter the charts. Mansfield wrote in AllMusic that the album "heralded the emergence of a Texas voice that contained both the knack for humor... and the depth for heartache". Nash praised the song variety, highlighting the singles and "It's Not Over" in particular, but felt that Chesnutt's voice was "a little too laid back".

=== Almost Goodbye ===
Chestnutt's third album for MCA was Almost Goodbye. Released in 1993, it produced three straight number-one singles on Hot Country Singles & Tracks: "It Sure Is Monday" (also written by Linde), the title track, and "I Just Wanted You to Know". The album's final single, a cover of Don Gibson's 1972 single "Woman, Sensuous Woman", was less successful on the charts. The album also became his third to be certified platinum. Mansfield wrote of the album in AllMusic that "Weak material weighs down Chesnutt's third release, though he still sings them like the most romantic western swinger since George Strait." He praised the title track for its string section, but criticized the uptempo material as being inferior to "Bubba Shot the Jukebox" and "Old Flames Have New Names". Nash felt that the album was "class-A honky-tonk, ballad, and Texas swing, delivered by a guy whose instincts are usually as sure as his pitch", but criticized the lyrics of the closing track "The Will". Also in 1993, Chesnutt won two awards from the Country Music Association: the Horizon Award, and Vocal Event of the Year for George Jones' 1992 single "I Don't Need Your Rockin' Chair", which featured Chesnutt as one of several guest vocalists and was awarded to all participants on the song. Following the success of Almost Goodbye, Chesnutt embarked on his first headlining tours in 1994, a move which Chesnutt later said inspired him to focus more on songwriting due to the minimal profitability from touring.

=== What a Way to Live ===
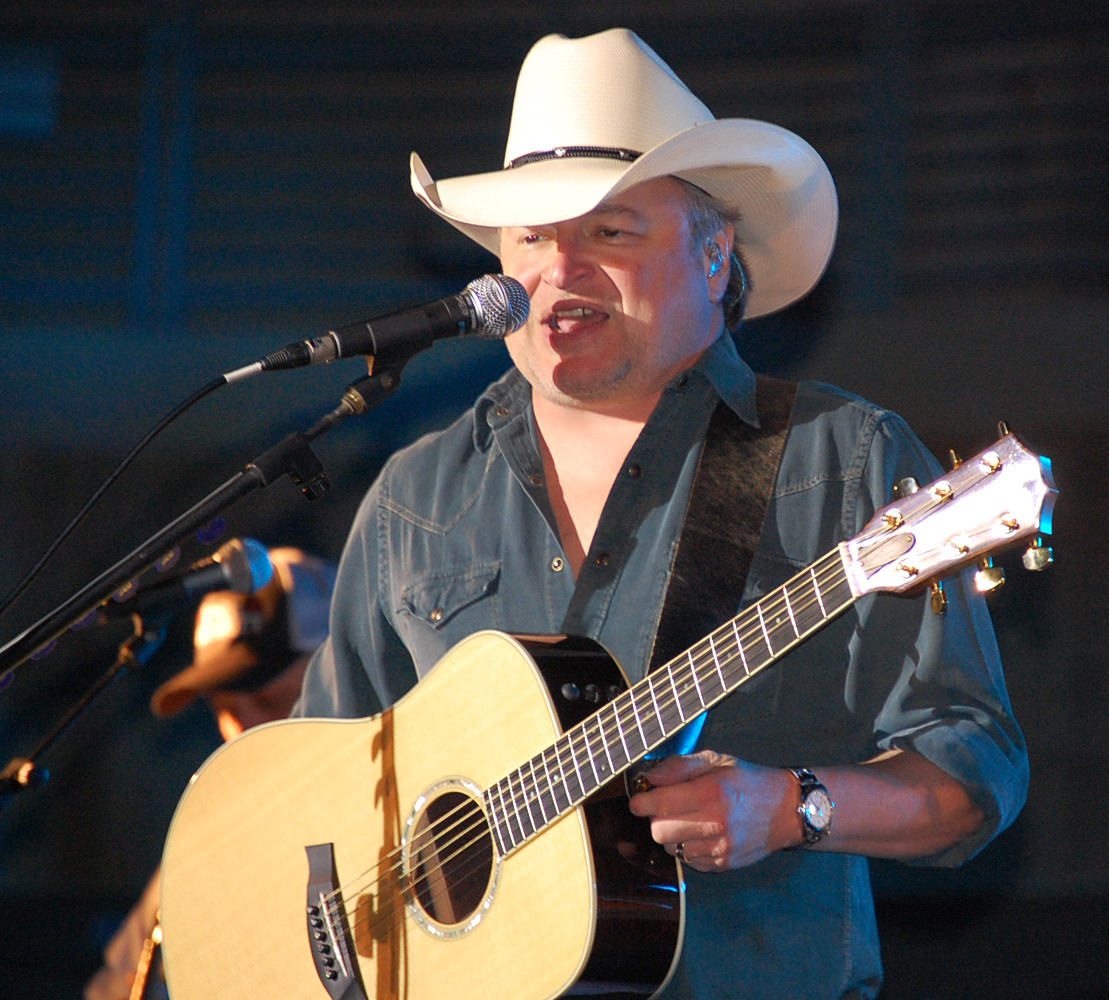
Chesnutt performing at Camp Humphreys in 2010.

In 1994, MCA revived the Nashville branch of Decca Records and moved Chesnutt to it. His first Decca album, What a Way to Live, came out that year. The album included four singles: "She Dreams", "Goin' Through the Big D", "Gonna Get a Life", and "Down in Tennessee". Of these, "She Dreams" was previously a single in 1993 for its co-writer Tim Mensy, while "Down in Tennessee" was previously a single for John Anderson in 1985. "Gonna Get a Life" was the most successful of the singles, reaching the top of the Billboard country charts in 1995. Two other cover songs were included on the album as well: the title track was originally recorded by Willie Nelson in 1960, while a cover of Waylon Jennings' 1974 single "Rainy Day Woman" included Jennings on duet vocals and lead guitar. Chesnutt said that he chose to record the Jennings cover at the suggestion of his managers while listening to Jennings' albums on his tour bus, and that Wright was responsible for making arrangements for Jennings to appear on the song. The album received a positive review from David Zimmerman of Gannett News Service, who praised the variety of traditional-leaning country sounds and Chesnutt's singing voice. Stephen Thomas Erlewine of AllMusic was less favorable, stating that the album "is dogged by inconsistent material, but Chesnutt's fine singing manages to save most of the weaker material from being a bore." What a Way to Live earned a gold certification from the RIAA in 1995 for shipments of 500,000 copies.

=== Wings and Greatest Hits ===
His next album, Wings, came out in 1995. For this album, Tony Brown served as producer instead of Wright. According to Chesnutt, he chose a different producer because Wright had wanted to push him to a more country pop style, a change with which Chesnutt disagreed. Chesnutt noted that the album was completed more quickly than his previous ones: while the others took an average of two months to complete due to him having to schedule recording sessions around tour dates, he was able to complete Wings in only ten consecutive days. He also took most of April and May 1995 off from touring, and resumed in June on a tour that also featured Brooks & Dunn. Contributing songwriters on Wings included Jim Lauderdale and Mack Vickery. The first single was a cover of Todd Snider's "Trouble", which Chesnutt took to Top 20 of Hot Country Songs in 1995. The album's second single, "It Wouldn't Hurt to Have Wings", was a top-ten country hit, while followup "Wrong Place, Wrong Time" was less successful on the charts. Also included on the album was a cover of Hank Williams Jr.'s 1972 hit "Pride's Not Hard to Swallow." Chesnutt co-wrote the track "As the Honky Tonk Turns", which he said was inspired by his early days singing in honky-tonk bars and observing the crowds. Rick Mitchell in The Encyclopedia of Country Music described it as a "honky-tonk concept album" that "bucked the commercial trend toward throwaway novelty tunes and lightweight country-pop." The album received largely positive reviews from publications such as Country Standard Time, Billboard, and AllMusic, all of which praised the songwriting quality and honky-tonk stylings of the music, with the former two publications also considering it among the strongest album releases of the year.

Decca issued a Greatest Hits package in 1996. This album reprised ten of his biggest hits and included two new songs in "It's a Little Too Late" and "Let It Rain"; both were released as singles, with the former becoming a number-one single on Billboard in 1997. At the time of this compilation's release, Chesnutt stated that he had toured almost nonstop for the past six years, and that he had wanted to take longer breaks between touring but was unable to since his album sales were not as strong as those of his contemporaries. Four years after its release, Greatest Hits became Chesnutt's fourth and final platinum album.

=== Thank God for Believers ===
In 1997, Chesnutt released Thank God for Believers, which reunited him with Wright on production duties. Of their reunion, Wright said that he felt that both of them were "on a downslide" prior to Wings, while Chesnutt said that "Mark and I kind of got away from each other for awhile because we needed it. We both lost a little bit of what we started together" and that, once the two started working together, "It was like we were never apart." The album also featured several songs penned by Roger Springer, with whom Chesnutt soon developed a friendship and songwriting relationship. This album's title track, which also served as the lead single, ascended to the number two position on the Hot Country Singles & Tracks charts by the end of 1997. While finishing the album, Chesnutt and Wright chose to include the same recording of "It's Not Over" that had previously appeared on Longnecks & Short Stories to replace a song that the two felt did not fit with the rest of the album. "It's Not Over" was sent out as the second single from Thank God for Believers due to demand from radio listeners. Chesnutt agreed to release the song because he felt it had potential as a single, and he was "disappointed" that it had not been a single from its original album. Two more singles followed in 1998: "I Might Even Quit Lovin' You" and "Wherever You Are". Nash called the album "a sometimes stunning reminder of the singer’s first-rate, smooth-as-bourbon interpretive style". Thom Owens wrote in AllMusic that the album was "strong, thoroughly enjoyable modern country."

=== I Don't Want to Miss a Thing ===
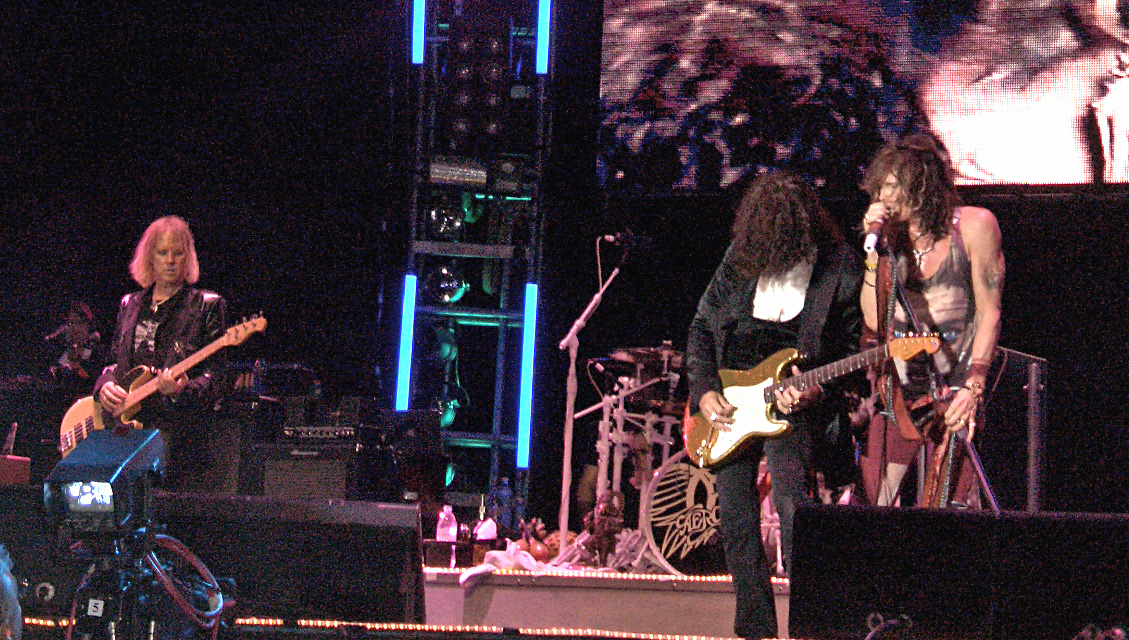
Chesnutt topped the country music charts in early 1999 with a cover of "I Don't Want to Miss a Thing", originally recorded by the rock band Aerosmith (pictured here in 2007).

In late 1998, Chesnutt recorded a cover version of Aerosmith's "I Don't Want to Miss a Thing" at the suggestion of Wright, who had heard the song on his car radio. Because the two thought that the song had potential as a single, Decca withdrew promotion of "Wherever You Are" in favor of the cover, which resulted in "Wherever You Are" becoming his first single not to make top 40 on the country music charts. Chesnutt said that he decided to cover the song because he felt that, despite his chart successes, he "wasn't getting noticed" due to the weaker sales of his last two albums compared to his first three. He felt that covering a pop song would "show people [he] could sing something other than the same old stuff", while also noting that many of his previous successful songs had been ballads. By early 1999, his version of "I Don't Want to Miss a Thing" had reached the top of the Hot Country Singles & Tracks charts; it was also his first entry on the Billboard Hot 100, where it ascended to No. 17. Despite showing favor toward the cover song at the time, he later expressed disdain for recording it; he told the blog Taste of Country in 2018 that he did not think that it fit his established style, that neither the single nor the corresponding album sold well despite the song's success at radio, and that he had refused offers from the label to release another cover of a pop song. The corresponding album, also titled I Don't Want to Miss a Thing, went on to account for only one other single in "This Heartache Never Sleeps". which reached top 20 on the country music charts. Nash wrote of the album that the cover was "a bit of a jolt", but added that Chesnutt "goes on to find enough snappy rhythm tunes and scampering Western swing to keep the toes tapping." An uncredited review from People magazine praised Chesnutt's singing voice and the "good and varied songs".

=== Lost in the Feeling ===
In January 1999, MCA Nashville dissolved the Decca Nashville division. While most of the artists were dropped, Chesnutt was one of only three to move back to MCA, alongside Lee Ann Womack and Gary Allan. MCA released his album Lost in the Feeling in October 2000. The album included covers of two songs co-written and originally recorded by Shawn Camp on his 1993 self-titled debut album, which was also produced by Wright: "Fallin' Never Felt So Good" and "Confessin' My Love". Also covered on the album were the title track, previously a single for Conway Twitty in 1983, and Gene Watson's 1975 single "Love in the Hot Afternoon". "Fallin' Never Felt So Good" and "Lost in the Feeling" were both issued as singles, but neither made Top 40 of the country music charts. A review in Billboard was positive, stating that "seldom has he packed more authority and emotion into a recording", highlighting the cover songs in particular. Maria Konicki Dinoia of AllMusic also showed favor toward the cover songs while comparing Chesnutt's voice to that of Merle Haggard. Lost in the Feeling was commercially unsuccessful, and Chesnutt was dropped from MCA's roster one month after the album's release. Despite not being on a label at the time, he sang duet vocals on Tracy Byrd's early-2001 single "A Good Way to Get on My Bad Side", from Byrd's album Ten Rounds.

=== Mark Chesnutt ===
Chesnutt signed to Columbia Records in 2002 for the release of his self-titled studio album. The lead single "She Was" went to number 11 on Hot Country Singles & Tracks and number 62 on the Hot 100, while the followup singles "I Want My Baby Back" and "I'm in Love with a Married Woman" did not reach Top 40 of the former. To promote the album, Chesnutt went on a 75-date tour known as the Rockin' Roadhouse Tour, which also featured Joe Diffie and Tracy Lawrence. Billy Joe Walker Jr. produced the album, and contributing musicians included Aubrey Haynie, Brent Mason, and Dan Dugmore. Both William Ruhlmann of AllMusic and Peter Cooper of The Tennessean criticized the album for weak songwriting, while John Lupton of Country Standard Time felt that the album was "about average for him, but...it's an average that's usually a cut above." Chesnutt later stated that he quickly left Columbia Records because executives had pressured him into recording more modern-sounding country pop instead of his traditional style, a concern that he had also had during his latter years at MCA.

=== Savin' the Honky Tonk and Heard It in a Love Song ===
Chesnutt's eleventh album, Savin' the Honky Tonk, was released in 2004 via the independent Vivaton! label. Jimmy Ritchey was the album's producer, and one of several contributing songwriters along with Chesnutt, Jerry Salley, Dean Miller, Jason Sellers, and Kevin Fowler. Chesnutt said that he intended for the album to be a return to the honky-tonk sounds of his earlier albums, and felt that being on an independent label allowed for him to record music that he wanted to record, as opposed to being pressured into recording songs that were forced upon him by major-label executives. The album accounted for three singles: "The Lord Loves the Drinkin' Man", "I'm a Saint", and "A Hard Secret to Keep". Erlewine said of the album that "Chesnutt not only sounds comfortable and relaxed, he's re-energized, both by the straight-ahead setting and the freedom to pick songs without an eye on the airwaves." Robert Loy of Country Standard Time considered the disc a concept album, noting the unifying theme of alcohol consumption in most of the songs. Chesnutt toured small venues in 2004 and 2005 in support of the album.

Heard It in a Love Song followed in 2006 on CBuJ Records. Its title track was previously a pop hit for The Marshall Tucker Band, and many of the other songs on the album were covers as well, including Charley Pride's "A Shoulder to Cry On" and Hank Williams's "Lost Highway". Barry Gilbert of the St. Louis Post-Dispatch rated the album "B", praising Chesnutt's singing voice and the contrast of the title track with the other cover songs. Mark Deming of AllMusic stated that "while Heard It in a Love Song lacks the hard country feel of [Savin' the Honky Tonk], it's a solid set that confirms the man's musical instincts are back on track."

=== Rollin' with the Flow and Outlaw ===
Chesnutt signed to Lofton Creek Records in 2007. His only disc for the label was Rollin' with the Flow, the title track of which was a number-one single on the country charts for Charlie Rich in 1977. Chesnutt's version reached number 25 on the same chart in late 2007-early 2008, and "She Never Got Me Over You" made the charts as well. The album once again featured Jimmy Ritchey as producer, with contributing musicians including Glenn Worf, Brent Mason, Eddie Bayers, and Lonnie Wilson. Ritchey also co-wrote several songs on the album. Mark Deming of AllMusic wrote of the album that it was "as solid an album as Chesnutt's ever recorded — which is saying plenty." Writing for Roughstock, Matt Bjorke said that it was "the kind of record that traditionalist country fans dream about. It has something for all those fans", highlighting Chesnutt's vocal delivery on the title track in particular.

In 2010, Chesnutt announced the release of his next studio album, Outlaw. The album includes covers of songs by outlaw country artists, including Waylon Jennings, Willie Nelson, Hank Williams Jr., Kris Kristofferson, Billy Joe Shaver, David Allan Coe, and Jerry Jeff Walker. According to Chesnutt, he was presented the idea by record producer Pete Anderson, best known for his work with Dwight Yoakam, when Saguaro Road Records was seeking an artist to perform a covers album. The two recorded the album at Anderson's studio in Burbank, California, in only two days. To support the album, he toured with Tracy Lawrence and Richie McDonald (of Lonestar) on the Country Rat Pack Tour. Thom Jurek referred to the album as "a no-frills, solid, lean, mean, rocking, emotionally sincere tribute to the outlaw generation, which is, in many ways, an extension of Chesnutt's own persona."

=== Live From The Big D, Greatest Hits II, and Tradition Lives ===
Chesnutt formed his own label, Nada Dinero, in 2012. His first release through this label was a live album called Live from the Big D, recorded in Dallas, Texas. This was followed by a second Greatest Hits package in 2015. The album accounted for one single, "When the Lights Go Out (Tracie's Song)".

Chesnutt continued to tour throughout the 2010s. In 2013, George Jones invited Chesnutt to be his opener on the last show of his farewell tour at Bridgestone Arena in Nashville, Tennessee. However, Jones died before the show could take place, so Chesnutt and other artists held a tribute show in Jones's honor instead. His next studio album, Tradition Lives, came out in 2016. Included on the album was a cover of Merle Haggard's "There Won't Be Another Now", from his 1985 album Kern River. According to Chesnutt, the cover was something that Ritchey and Chesnutt had done for fun, without the intention of ever putting it on an album, due to it being one of Chesnutt's favorite Merle Haggard songs. As Haggard died just before the album's release, they chose to include it as a tribute to him. Of the album's sound, Chesnutt remarked that "I wanted to show the world that I’m still here and that I’m still Country. I’m not changing with the times." Erlewine noted the "simple, spare, and easy" production of the album, and thought that it was similar in sound to Chesnutt's earlier albums.

== Additional contributions ==
In 1993, Chesnutt was featured in an ad campaign for Frito-Lay where he sang their tagline "I know what I like and I like Fritos." In 1994, he contributed three cover songs to multi-artist compilation albums. These were Merle Haggard's "Goodbye Comes Hard for Me", recorded for the AIDS benefit album Red Hot + Country; Keith Whitley's "I Never Go Around Mirrors (I've Got a Heartache to Hide)" to Keith Whitley: A Tribute Album; and "Good Ones and Bad Ones", a duet with George Jones on the latter's 1994 duets album The Bradley Barn Sessions. In 1996, the radio station WKIS in Boca Raton, Florida, compiled a Christmas album titled A Country Christmas from WKIS 99.9, to which Chesnutt contributed a recording of the Christmas carol "What Child Is This?" His version made the Hot Country Songs charts that same year due to seasonal airplay.

== Musical style and influences ==
Chesnutt's musical style draws mainly from honky-tonk and neotraditional country. Due to both singers hailing from Beaumont, Chesnutt was frequently compared stylistically to George Jones. Jack Hurst of the Chicago Tribune wrote that he was "a throwback to the inwardly-tough, just-do-it kind of country star they were making back when they minted George Jones, who preceded Chesnutt out of the rough-and-tumble East Texas honky-tonks 40 years ago." Nash described Chesnutt's vocal style by saying that he "has a comely, smooth baritone and a supple way of moving through his vocal range", and a "friendly foghorn" with "earnestness". Rick Mitchell, writing in The Encyclopedia of Country Music, described Chesnutt as "arguably the strongest pure-country voice to come out of Southeastern Texas since George Jones", and an uncredited review in People said that Chesnutt "has a natural, George Jonesian sob and enough machismo to get away with going falsetto when he wants." Chesnutt has cited Merle Haggard, Hank Williams, and Elvis Presley as major influences of his. Mitchell also noted that Chesnutt was able to have success with both ballads and uptempo material such as "Bubba Shot the Jukebox" and "Old Flames Have New Names", as well as the strong presence of cover songs from the 1950s and 1960s. Some of his songs, such as "It Sure Is Monday" and "Gonna Get a Life", have featured influences of Cajun music through prominent use of fiddle and accordion.

Chesnutt's musical persona placed a greater emphasis on song quality over physical attractiveness, compared to the move toward young and attractive males that prevailed in country music in the 1990s. Nash stated that he "distanced himself from the pack with an identifiable baritone and a focus on music over image", and Barry Gilbert of the St. Louis Post-Dispatch similarly stated that he "put the music and his warm, classic-country voice before the image." Chesnutt stated in a 1996 interview that "I would rather play honky-tonks the rest of my life for $500 a week than be something I'm not." He noted that during his latter years at Decca and MCA, he was constantly pressured by label heads to record more mainstream-friendly country pop instead of the traditional sounds of his earlier albums, due to the genre's shift away from neotraditional country having a negative impact on his album sales. He also said that some of the tracks on Savin' the Honky Tonk were songs that the major labels had rejected, and that he would "rather sell 100,000 albums [of traditional country] than 6 million of some crap that I wasn't happy with."

== Personal life ==
Chesnutt has been married to the former Tracie Motley since 1992. The two met in a bar, and according to Chesnutt, "She came out there with a guy she was with at the time, and I took her away from him". The couple have three sons: Waylon, Casey, and Cameron. Waylon was named after Waylon Jennings, who jokingly suggested during the recording sessions for their cover of "Rainy Day Woman" that the then-pregnant Tracie name their child after him. Although Jennings later stated that the suggestion was a joke, Chesnutt decided to choose the name anyway. In late 1995, following Waylon Chesnutt's birth, Tracie typically stayed home at the couple's house in Jasper, Texas, while also working as an artist. The birth of his sons also caused Chesnutt to tour less frequently by the end of the 1990s, as he wanted to be able to spend more time with his family.

=== Health ===
In October 2021, Chesnutt announced that he would be taking a hiatus from touring until 2022 in order to recover from back surgery. On November 1, 2023, Chesnutt was hospitalized for an issue that required critical care, and underwent multiple tests to determine the exact problem. Several of his concerts were canceled, but his condition was reported as stable. He canceled further shows in June 2024 after being hospitalized again for an emergency quadruple bypass surgery. Minor health issues caused further cancellations in 2026.

== Discography ==
Studio albums

- Doing My Country Thing (1988)
- Too Cold at Home (1990)
- Longnecks & Short Stories (1992)
- Almost Goodbye (1993)
- What a Way to Live (1994)
- Wings (1995)
- Thank God for Believers (1997)
- I Don't Want to Miss a Thing (1999)
- Lost in the Feeling (2000)
- Mark Chesnutt (2002)
- Savin' the Honky Tonk (2004)
- Heard It in a Love Song (2006)
- Rollin' with the Flow (2008)
- Outlaw (2010)
- Tradition Lives (2016)
- Duets (2017)
- The Early Years (2017)
- Gone But Not Forgotten...A Tribute Album by Mark Chesnutt (2018)

=== Billboard number-one hits ===
- "Brother Jukebox" (2 weeks, 1990-1991)
- "I'll Think of Something" (1 week, 1992)
- "It Sure Is Monday" (1 week, 1993)
- "Almost Goodbye" (1 week, 1993)
- "I Just Wanted You to Know" (1 week, 1993-1994)
- "Gonna Get a Life" (1 week, 1995)
- "It's a Little Too Late" (2 weeks, 1996-1997)
- "I Don't Want to Miss a Thing" (2 weeks, 1998-1999)

== Awards and nominations ==
=== TNN/Music City News Country Awards ===
Year	Nominee / work	Award	Result
1992	Mark Chesnutt	Star of Tomorrow	Nominated
1993	George Jones and Friends^{[A]}	Vocal Collaboration of the Year	Nominated
1994	Mark Chesnutt	Star of Tomorrow	Nominated

=== Academy of Country Music Awards ===
Year	Nominee / work	Award	Result
1991	Mark Chesnutt	Top New Male Vocalist	Shortlisted
1992	Mark Chesnutt	Top New Male Vocalist	Nominated
1994	Mark Chesnutt	Top Male Vocalist of the Year	Shortlisted
1994	"Almost Goodbye"	Single Record of the Year	Shortlisted
1995	Waylon Jennings and Mark Chesnutt	Top Vocal Duo of the Year	Shortlisted

=== Country Music Association Awards ===
Year	Nominee / work	Award	Result
1991	Mark Chesnutt	Horizon Award	Nominated
1993	Mark Chesnutt	Horizon Award	Won
1993	"I Don't Need Your Rockin' Chair"^{[B]}	Vocal Event of the Year	Won

^[A] George Jones' "Friends" also includes: Vince Gill, Garth Brooks, Travis Tritt, Joe Diffie, Alan Jackson, Pam Tillis, T. Graham Brown, Patty Loveless and Clint Black
^[B] Nominated alongside George Jones and Friends
