= Tim Menzies =

American singer-songwriter

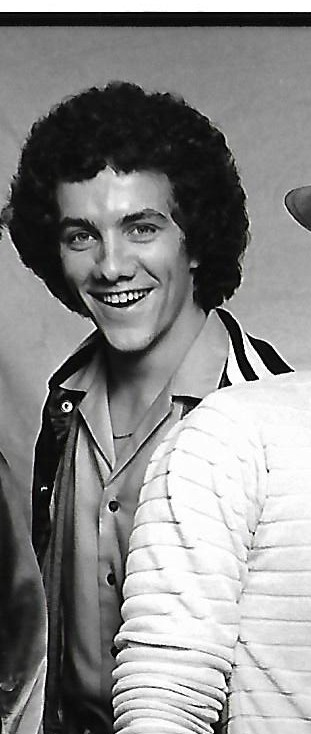
- Menzies in the 1980s

Background information
- Also known as: Tim Mensy
- Born: Timothy Ray Menzies; August 25, 1959 (age 66)
- Origin: Mechanicsville, Virginia, United States
- Genres: Country, Christian music
- Occupation: Singer-songwriter
- Instruments: Vocals, guitar
- Years active: 1982–present
- Labels: Columbia; Giant
- Formerly of: Bandana

Timothy Ray Menzies (born August 25, 1959), sometimes known as Tim Mensy, is an American country music artist. Initially, he was a member of the band Bandana, in which he charted several singles on the Hot Country Songs charts in the 1980s. After leaving Bandana, Menzies began a solo career on Columbia Records in 1990, releasing his debut album Stone by Stone that year. A second album, This Ol' Heart, followed in 1992 on Giant Records. Overall, these two albums produced six singles for Menzies on the country charts as well.

In addition to his work as a musician, Menzies has written songs for several artists, including Mark Chesnutt, Shelby Lynne, Trisha Yearwood, and Reba McEntire.

== Biography ==
Menzies was born in Mechanicsville, Virginia. He debuted as a performer at age three, with a band his mother was a member of. Born to a musical family, he, his two brothers, two sisters, and parents performed throughout Virginia. They opened shows for Dolly Parton, Johnny Cash and other country music stars. At age eight, he was playing mandolin in the band. Menzies suffered a hearing disorder as a child, which he overcame at age sixteen following seven operations.

In the mid-1980s, he played guitar in the group Bandana, which released ten singles for Warner Bros. Records between 1985 and 1987. Menzies left the band in 1986 and was replaced by Michael Black and Billy Kemp.

Menzies co-wrote the single "Mama Knows," recorded by Shenandoah and released in 1989. That same year he signed to Columbia Records, performing as Tim Mensy, with his debut album Stone by Stone following a year later. It produced three singles, all of which made the lower regions of the country music charts.

A second album, This Ol' Heart, followed on the Giant label in 1992. It included three singles, one of which ("She Dreams") was later a Top Ten hit for Mark Chesnutt in 1994. Menzies did not release another album until the self-titled Tim Mensy in 2002.

In 2014, Tim Menzies released a Christian album titled His Way Of Loving Me. It was released under his birth name and created with help from Ben Isaacs of The Isaacs family band. His 2019 album His Name is Jesus was nominated for a Grammy Award for Best Roots Gospel Album.

== Discography ==
=== Albums ===
Title	Album details	Peak positions
Title	Album details	US Country
Stone by Stone	Release date: February 22, 1990; Label: Columbia Records	72
This Ol' Heart	Release date: August 11, 1992; Label: Giant Records	—
Tim Mensy	Release date: March 19, 2002; Label: PJM	—
His Way of Loving Me	Release date: March 10, 2014; Label: By Grace Records	—
His Name is Jesus	Release date: May 31, 2019; Label: New Day	—
"—" denotes releases that did not chart

=== Singles ===
Year	Single	Peak chart positions		Album
Year	Single	US Country	CAN Country	Album
1989	"Hometown Advantage"	67	—	Stone by Stone
1989	"Stone by Stone"	60	—	Stone by Stone
1990	"You Still Love Me in My Dreams"	82	85	Stone by Stone
1990	"Too Close to Tulsa"	—	—	Stone by Stone
1992	"This Ol' Heart"	53	86	This Ol' Heart
1992	"That's Good"	52	72	This Ol' Heart
1993	"She Dreams"	74	—	This Ol' Heart
"—" denotes releases that did not chart

=== Music videos ===
Year	Video	Director
1989	"Stone by Stone"	Deaton-Flanigen Productions
1990	"You Still Love Me in My Dreams"	Deaton-Flanigen Productions
1992	"This Ol' Heart"	
1992	"That's Good"	Steven Goldmann
