= Roger Springer =

American singer-songwriter

- Born: June 15, 1962 (age 64)
- Origin: Caddo, Oklahoma, U.S.
- Genre: Country
- Occupation: Singer-songwriter
- Instruments: Vocals, guitar
- Years active: 1992–present
- Labels: MCA Nashville; Giant Records

Roger Springer (born June 15, 1962) is an American country music artist. Springer's only single as a solo artist, "The Right One Left," was released in 1992 on MCA Nashville and peaked at No. 69 on the Billboard Hot Country Singles & Tracks chart.

"The Right One Left" was to have been included on a self-titled debut album (produced by Allen Reynolds), but MCA shelved the album due to the single’s poor chart performance and Springer was dropped from the label shortly afterwards.

In 1998, Springer formed the country music trio Springer! with Shara Johnson and Joe Manuel. Their first single, "Don't Try to Find Me," peaked at No. 64 on the Hot Country Singles & Tracks chart. A second single, "Ain't Nothing but a Cloud," was released in 1999 but failed to chart. Renamed The Roger Springer Band, Giant released the trio's eponymous debut album in July 1999 shortly before they disbanded.

As a songwriter, Springer has co-written single releases by Mark Chesnutt ("I Might Even Quit Lovin' You," "It's a Little Too Late," "Let It Rain," "Thank God for Believers"), Sammy Kershaw ("Matches") and Love and Theft ("Dancing in Circles").

== Discography ==
=== Albums ===
Title	Album details
The Roger Springer Band	Release date: July 20, 1999; Label: Giant Records

=== Singles ===
Year	Single	Peak chart positions		Album
Year	Single	US Country	CAN Country	Album
1992	"The Right One Left"	69	—	Roger Springer(unreleased)
1998	"Don't Try to Find Me"	64	92	The Roger Springer Band
1999	"Ain't Nothing but a Cloud"	—	—	The Roger Springer Band
"—" denotes releases that did not chart

=== Music videos ===
Year	Video	Director
1992	"The Right One Left"	Bill Young
