= List of songs about Oklahoma =

List of songs about the U.S. state Oklahoma

A list of songs about the U.S. state of Oklahoma, Oklahomans and Oklahoma locations.

== Songs about Oklahoma ==
=== # ===
- "24 Hours From Tulsa" — Gene Pitney; written by Burt Bacharach and Hal David, 1963

=== A ===
- "Ada on My Mind," written and recorded by Jeremy Castle, 2010.
- "Ain't No Love in Oklahoma," written by Luke Combs, Jessi Alexander and Jonathan Singleton, sung by Combs in the movie Twisters, 2024.
- "Ain't Oklahoma Pretty" – written and sung by John Pizzarelli, performed with Bucky Pizzarelli, 2009.
- "All Aboard" - Chuck Berry, 1961.
- "All Aboard for Oklahoma" – Spade Cooley and Ike Cargill, vocal by Red Egner, 1947.
- "All Across Oklahoma" – The Brombies, 2010.
- "All the Time in the World" – John Fullbright, 2012.
- "Almost to Tulsa" – Buddy Charleton, pedal steel guitarist with Ernest Tubb and the Texas Troubadors, 1967. – Later recorded by Mike Auldridge on Dobro.
- "Along the Verdigris" – Tom Paxton, recorded with Iris Dement singing harmony, 1994.
- "Anywhere I'm Loving You" – Matt Hillyer and Eleven Hundred Springs, 1999.

=== B ===
- "The Bad Roads of Oklahoma" — Susan Herndon, 2010.
- "Back in Oklahoma" – Written and performed by Jamie Richards, 2004.
- "Back in Oklahoma" – Wayde Blair, 2006.
- "Back to Oklahoma" – Ned Miller, 1970; written by Alan O'Day.
- "Back to Oklahoma" – Michael Fracasso, 1995.
- "Back to Oklahoma" – Jim Layeux, 1998.
- "Back to Oklahoma" – Donnie Duree, 2009.
- "Baja Oklahoma" – written by Willie Nelson and Dan Jenkins for the HBO movie of the same name, 1988. Later recorded with significant variations by Karla Bonoff, 2007.
- "Ballad of the Oklahoma Women's Liberation Front" – Beth Elliott, 1976.
- "Beim alten Bill in Oklahoma" – Written by Ulrich Jonas, Peter Power and Rolf Soja, recorded by Heino, 1979.
- "Big Boat Across Oklahoma" – Hank Thompson, co-written with William Penix, 1969.
- "Big Cedar" – Bill Grant and Delia Bell, 1976 and 1980.
- "Blown Away" – written by Josh Kear and Chris Tompkins, recorded by Carrie Underwood, 2012.
- "Blues for Oklahoma" – Virgel Bozman, 1950.
- "Bob's Got a Swing Band in Heaven" – Red Steagall, 1978.
- "Border Oklahoma" – Norfolk & Western, 2001.
- "Boy from Oklahoma" (about Woody Guthrie) – Willis Alan Ramsey, 1972.
- "Boys from Oklahoma" – Written by Gene Collier; recorded by Cross Canadian Ragweed, 2002.

=== C ===
- "California Cotton Fields" – Written by Dallas Frazier and Earl Montgomery, recorded by Frazier, then by Merle Haggard, 1969/71.
- "California Okie" – Kevin "Blackie" Farrell, recorded by Commander Cody and His Lost Planet Airmen, 1975.
- "California Okie" – Robert John Jones, a.k.a. "Rocky Topp", writer; recorded by Buck Owens, 1976.
- "California Okies" – Betty Overstreet, 2007/8.
- "Cherokee Maiden" – written by Cindy Walker, recorded by Bob Wills, 1942; a No. 1 hit for Merle Haggard, 1976; later performed by Asleep at the Wheel, 1999.
- "Cherokee Strip" – written by Glenn and Tim Spencer, members of the Sons of the Pioneers, 1940. Performed by the group in the movie The Durango Kid. Later recorded by Bob Beckham, 1967.
- "Chickasha City" – written by Kris Bergsnes, Larry W. Herbstritt, Brian Dean Maher and Rich McCready, recorded by McCready, 2005; later recorded by Charley Austin, 2008.
- "Choctaw Bingo" – James McMurtry, 2002; also recorded by Ray Wylie Hubbard, 2005.
- "Chouteau, Oklahoma" – Brian Wyer, 2008.
- "Cimarron (Roll On)" – The Jimmy Wakely Trio; written by one of the trio, Johnny Bond, 1938.
- "Cleveland County Blues" – John Moreland, 2015.
- "Coal County Country" – Ed and Jolene Bullard, 1983.
- "Crazy About Oklahoma" – written by Al Smith, recorded by Jimmy Reed, 1967.

=== D ===
- "The Day That She Left Tulsa (In a Chevy)" – written by Steven R. Diamond and Mark Daniel Sanders, recorded by Wade Hayes, 1997.
- "Dear Okie" – Doye O'Dell and Rudy Sooter, 1948. Later recorded by the New Lost City Ramblers, 1968, and Hank Thompson, 1969.
- "Death Trip to Tulsa" – Mark Lanegan, 2014.
- "The Devil Went on to Tulsa" – Jana Jae, 1979.
- "Does the Wind Still Blow in Oklahoma?" – Reba McEntire & Ronnie Dunn, 2007.
- "(Don't Let the Sun Set on You in) Tulsa" – written by Wayne Carson Thompson, recorded first by him (as Wayne Carson), then by Glenn Yarbrough, both 1969, and then by Waylon Jennings, 1970. (The Waylon Jennings record is often listed with the one-word title "Tulsa.")
- "Don't Make Me Come to Tulsa" – written by Don Cook, recorded by Wade Hayes, 1994.
- "Down in Oklahoma" – Ginger Prince; written by Lee "Lasses" White; from the film The Prince of Peace, (also known as The Lawton Story), 1949/51.
- "Down in Stillwater Oklahoma" – written by Joe King and Benny McArthur. Recorded by Joe King, 2020.
- "Down to the Ark" – written by John Darnielle, performed live by The Mountain Goats on American Public Media's Weekend America in 2008.
- "Dust Pneumonia Blues," Woody Guthrie,1940.

=== E ===
- "East Tulsa Stomp" — Combsy, 2017. Instrumental.
- "El Reno" — written by Rudy Sooter, recorded by Merle Travis, 1950.
- "En un Carril de Oklahoma" – written by Ramiro Cleto, recorded by Vagon Chicano, 2006.
- "Endless Oklahoma Sky" – John Moreland and the Black Gold Band, 2008.
- "Enid, Oklahoma" – Brad Fielder, 2010.
- "The Everlasting Hills of Oklahoma" – Tim Spencer, founding member of the Sons of the Pioneers, 1946. Composed for the 1946 film Home in Oklahoma.

=== F ===
- "Fabulous Oklahoma" – Hank Harral, 1957.
- "Falling (It's a Long Long Way From Hollis, Oklahoma)" – Terry Stafford, 1989.
- "Farmer's Luck" – Written and recorded by Greg Jacobs, 2001. Later recorded by Jason Boland & the Stragglers, 2011. About the creation of Lake Eufaula.
- "Fire Eyed Woman from Oklahoma" – written by Brandon L. Harris, recorded by the Franklin Brothers, 1970.
- "Flood to the Drought" — Lauren Barth, 2017.
- "Fly Over States" – written by Neil Thrasher and Michael Dulaney, recorded by Jason Aldean, 2010.
- "For Oklahoma, I'm Yearning" – Jack Guthrie, cowritten with his sister Wava White, recorded 1947, unreleased until 1991.
- "Fort Gibson Lake" — Jared Tyler, 2017.
- "Freedom, Oklahoma" – Rascal and McLane XL The Band, from Germany, 2006.
- "From Oklahoma with Love" – Becky Hobbs, 1998.
- "From Tulsa to North Caroline" – Link Wray, co-written with Yvonne Verroca; recorded 1971, released on the LP Beans and Fatback, 1973.

=== G ===
- "The Gal from Oklahoma" – Junior Brown, 1993.
- "Girl from Oklahoma" – Beau Jennings, 2008.
- "Girl from Oklahoma" – Steel Panther, 2009.
- "The Girl in Oklahoma" – written by Billy McCoy, recorded by Tracey K. Houston, 2000.
- "The Girl Who Danced Oklahoma" – Terry Allen, 1978.
- "Give Me a Home in Oklahoma" – Gene Austin, 1947.
- "God Is Down in Oklahoma" – Mike West, 2000.
- "God's in Oklahoma Today" – Justin McBride, co-written with Philip O'Donnell and Wynn Varble, 2008.
- "Goin' Back to Oklahoma" – Eddie Meduza, 1979.
- "Goin' to Oklahoma" – written by Bob Bryden, recorded by Christmas, 1970.
- "Going Back to Oklahoma" – Emily Kaitz, 1998.
- "Going Out to Tulsa" – written by C. E. Daniels, recorded by Johnny Seay, 1968.
- "Going to Scotland" – The Mountain Goats, 1996.
- "Good Old Oklahoma" – written by Bob Wills and Tommy Duncan, lead singer with Bob Wills and the Texas Playboys, and recorded by them in 1935. More recently recorded by JD McPherson and Pokey Lafarge, 2013.
- "Goodbye Oklahoma" – written by Eberhard (Lo) Faber, recorded by God Street Wine, 1997.
- "Gotta Get to Oklahoma ('Cause California's Gettin' to Me)" – The Hagers; written by Rodney Lay and Buck Owens, 1969.
- "(Gotta Get To) Oklahoma City" – Written by Don Reed and Dan Franklin, recorded by Luke Wills' Rhythm Busters, 1947.
- "The Great State of Oklahoma" – Ali Harter, 2012.
- "Guthrie" – Hank Thompson, 1969.

=== H ===
- "Halfway to Tulsa" – written by Leroy Drumm and Cal Freeman, recorded by Larry Sparks, 1992.
- "Hang Me in the Tulsa County Stars" – John Moreland, 2015.
- "Happy, Oklahoma" – Hank Thompson, co-written with William Penix, 1969.
- "He's a Real Gone Oakie" – written by Mary London, recorded by Judy Hayden with Cliffie Stone and His Orchestra, 1948. See below under S for a male vocalist version, "She's a Real Gone Oakie."
- "Heart of Oklahoma" – Mark Whitehead, 2005.
- "Hell and Oklahoma" – The Michael Abbott Band, 2011. Also recorded by Aaron Benward, 2011.
- "Henryetta, Oklahoma" – Marvin Rainwater, co-written with Dale Siegenthaler, 1981.
- "Here with You" – Saliva, 2007.
- "Hereford Heaven" – written by Oklahoma Governor Roy J. Turner, recorded by the Flying L Ranch Quartet, 1945. Used the following year in the 1946 film Home in Oklahoma, performed again by the Flying L Ranch Quartet.
- "High on Tulsa Heat" – John Moreland, 2015.
- "Hollis, Oklahoma" – The Tyler McCumber Band, 2006.
- "Holy Tulsa Thunder" – Beau Jennings, 2008.
- "Home in Oklahoma" – written by Jack Elliott for Roy Rogers and the Sons of the Pioneers in their 1946 movie also called Home in Oklahoma.
- "Home Sweet Oklahoma" – written by Tom Glazer, recorded by Roy Rogers, 1951.
- "Home Sweet Oklahoma" – written and recorded by Leon Russell, 1970.
- "Home, Sweet Oklahoma" – written and recorded by Tom Paxton, 1991.
- "Home Sweet Oklahoma" – Patrick Brealey & the Knives, 2007.
- "Home Sweet Oklahoma" – Patti Page and Vince Gill, written by Ted Hewitt and Kris Bergsnes, 2008. (The Glazer, Russell, Paxton, Brealey and Hewitt/Bergsnes songs are five completely different compositions.)
- "Homesick, Lonesome, Hillbilly Okie" – Hank Thompson, co-written with William Penix, 1969.
- "Hungover in Oklahoma City" – Joe "King" Carrasco, 2008.

=== I ===
- "I Ain't in Checotah Anymore" – Carrie Underwood, co-written by her, Trey Bruce and Angelo Petraglia, 2005.
- "I Heard Oklahoma Calling Me" – David Allan Coe, 1987.
- "I Wanna Make Her Mine" – Jeremy Castle, 2002.
- "I Was Born in Oklahoma" – Bryant Oden, 2011.
- "I'll See You in Oklahoma" – Written by Frank Skinner, Al Skinner, and Alan Clark. Recorded by George Cates, 1957. The official State Semi-Centennial Song.
- "I'm a Poor Oakie" — Arkie Shibley, co-written with W. S. Stevenson, 1960.
- "I'm Goin' Back to Oklahoma" – written by Egbert Van Alstyne and Harry Williams, 1912.
- "I'm Gonna Send You Back to Oklahoma" – Ted Taylor, 1969.
- "I've Got Those Oklahoma Blues" – Bill Boyd and His Cowboy Ramblers. This 1938 recording is of a song written by Frank Wallace (Frankie Marvin) who first recorded it in 1928 under its original title "Oklahoma Blues"–see below in this list for that song and other compositions with the same title.
- "Idabel Blues" – written by David Clark and John Cooper, recorded by their band, the Red Dirt Rangers, 1996. Later recorded by Stoney LaRue, 2005.
- "If I Ever Get Back to Oklahoma" – Jason Boland & the Stragglers, 1999.
- "If You're Ever in Oklahoma" – J.J. Cale, 1972.
- "In Oklahoma" – Mel McDaniel, 1986.
- "In Oklahoma" – written by Cody Canada and Stoney LaRue, performed by Cross Canadian Ragweed, 2007.
- "In Ole Oklahoma" – Pinky Tomlin, 1938. Tomlin wrote that it was at one time Oklahoma's official state song. It won a statewide contest for "New State Song" sponsored by the Oklahoma Junior Chamber of Commerce.
- "In Tishomingo" – Jeremy Castle, 2023.

=== J ===
- Jack Straw — Music composed by Bob Weir and lyrics written by Robert Hunter, recorded by the Grateful Dead. The song first appeared as a track on the Europe '72 album, 1972.

=== K ===
- "Kiamichi Mountain Home" – Bill Grant and Delia Bell, 1972.
- "The Kiamichi Trace" – Bill Grant, 2008.
- "King of Oklahoma" – Michael Franks, 1973.

=== L ===
- "Last Trip to Tulsa" – Neil Young, 1968.
- "Lawton, Oklahoma Blues" – Lawyer ("Soldier Boy") Houston, recorded in 1950, released in 1972.
- "Leroy's Dust Bowl Blues" – written by Steve Earle, recorded by him with Del McCoury, 1999.
- "A Long Way from OK" – Jeff Wood, co-written by him with Gary Burr and Pat McDonald, 1997.
- "A Long Way from OK" – Granger Smith, 2005.
- "Lonesome Okie Goin' Home" – Merl Lindsay, 1948.
- "Lost My Heart in Oklahoma" – Kevin Fowler, 1997.
- "Loves in Oklahoma" – Jason Eklund, 1993.

=== M ===
- "M'en revenant de l'Oklahoma" – Paul Brunelle, 1969. In Québécois French. Later recorded by Normand Grenier, 2004.
- "Man from Oklahoma" – written by Sanford Green and June Carroll for the 1945 movie The Man from Oklahoma, performed by Roy Rogers and the Sons of the Pioneers and other cast members in the film.
- "Mannford, Oklahoma" – Lee Hazlewood, recorded 1967, released only in Germany and Scandinavia in 1968.
- "Mehan, Oklahoma" – James Talley, 1974.
- "Moffet, Oklahoma" – written by Curtis Leach and Claude McBride, recorded by Charlie Walker, 1967.
- "Moonlight in Oklahoma" – Smokey Wood and His Woodchips, 1937/8.
- "My Chickashay Gal" – Spade Cooley and Smokey Rogers, 1945. Recorded by Roy Rogers, 1947.
- "My Little Okie Sweetheart" – Floyd Davis.
- "My Oklahoma" – written by Cheryl Young (a.k.a. Terrye Newkirk). Recorded by Steve Young, 1972, Country Gazette, 1973, and Riders in the Sky, 1987.
- "My Oklahoma" – Clay Greenberg, 2000. (Greenberg's and Young's/Newkirk's songs are two completely different compositions.)
- "My Oklahoma Angel Love" – Charles Manson, recorded 1980s, released 1999.
- "My Oklahoma Home" – Gene Autry, 1929.
- "My Oklahoma Home" – written by Reed Mathis, recorded by him with Tea Leaf Green, 2011.
- "My Oklahoma Home Blowed Away" – Sis Cunningham and her brother Bill, recorded most famously by Pete Seeger, 1961, and on a Seeger tribute CD by Bruce Springsteen, as "My Oklahoma Home," 2006.
- "My Oklahoma Lullaby" – Tom Paxton, 2002.
- "My Oklahoma Rose" – Billy Hayes and Marty Symes, recorded by Wilf Carter (Montana Slim), in 1951, released in 1952.
- "My Pathway Leads to Oklahoma" – written by Tracy Schwarz (as "My Pathway Leads to Pennsylvania"); lyrics modified and recorded by Bill Grant and Delia Bell, 1978.
- "My Pony Knows the Way" – Tom Paxton, 2002.
- "My Rose of Oklahoma" – Goldwing Express recorded "Oklahoma Rose," written by Jesse McReynolds, under this title, 1998.

=== N ===
- "NE OK" — written by Beau Roberson, recorded by Pilgrim, 2015.
- "Never Been to Spain" – Written by Oklahoman Hoyt Axton, recorded by Three Dog Night, 1971.
- "New Memories of Oklahoma" – Lac La Belle, 2012.
- "Next to the Soil" – Everett I. "Billy" Hughes, 1946, recorded by Jack Guthrie, released 1948.
- "No U in Oklahoma" – written by Ronnie Dunn, Reba McEntire and Donna McSpadden, recorded by Reba McEntire, 2019.
- "Nothin' New in Oklahoma" – Bobby Bond (Bob Reinhardt), 1971.

=== O ===
- "O-k-l-a-h-o-m-a" – Hank Thompson, 1969. Also known as "O K L A H O M A" and "Oklahoma."
- "Oakie Boogie" – Johnny Tyler, 1946; also brecorded by Jack Guthrie, 1946, Ella Mae Morse, 1952, and others.
- "OKC" - Oh Dang, 2026.
- "Okie" – J. J. Cale, 1974.
- "Okie Blondie" – written by Hank Thompson, Billy Gray and Dick Reynolds; recorded by Thompson, 1952, but not released until 2008; recorded by Billy Gray, 1955.
- "Okie from L.A." – Cort Murray, 2007.
- "Okie from Muskogee" – Merle Haggard, co-written with Roy Eddie Burris, 1969.
- "Okie Moon" – Steve Suffet, 2005.
- "Okie Noodlin'" – The Como Avenue Jug Band, 2011.
- "Okie Road" – Homer Joy, 2007.
- "Okie Skies" – The Bays Brothers, 2004.
- "The Okie Surfer" – written by David Gates, lead singer of The Country Boys, 1964.
- "Okie Wind" – Greg Jacobs, 1997.
- "Okies in California" – Doye O'Dell, 1949.
- "Oklahoma" – many different songs have this one-word title. Arranged chronologically, the list that follows gives some samples from their lyrics to distinguish them from each other:

- "Oklahoma" (Since 1953, Oklahoma's official state song) – Rodgers and Hammerstein, 1943. "Where the wind comes sweeping down the plain."
- "Oklahoma" – written by Webb Pierce, Max Powell and DeWayne Phillips, recorded by Cal Smith, 1968. "Oklahoma how I wish I could come home."
- "Oklahoma" – Sammy Kershaw, 1979. "Oklahoma, you got the best part of me."
- "Oklahoma" – The Call, 1986. "Another hot Oklahoma night."
- "Oklahoma" – Written by J. C. (Christer) Ericcson, recorded by Lasse Stefanz, 1986. In Swedish. "Långt bort till Oklahoma, bort till Nashville Tennessee."
- "Oklahoma" – P (Johnny Depp and Gibby Haynes), 1995.
- "Oklahoma" – Scud Mountain Boys, 1995. "She's gone to Oklahoma/I don't know where that is."
- "Oklahoma" – Quarkspace: band members Paul Williams, Darren Gough, Chet Santia, Jay Swanson, 1996.
- "Oklahoma" – Dan Bern, co-written with Chris Chandler, 1997. "On the 19th day of April/In 1995/There was the worst car bombing/Near 200 people died."
- "Oklahoma" – Whiskeytown, 1997. "See old Mabel walk on down . . ." (No audible reference to Oklahoma.)
- "Oklahoma" – Fink, 1997. In German. "Der Wind in Oklahoma ist der gleiche/Wie hier nur er gehört nach Oklahoma."
- "Oklahoma" – The Dead Salesmen (Australia), 1997. From their CD Bluestoned. Only reference to Oklahoma is a single mention 40 seconds from the end of the song.
- "Oklahoma" – Lynn Woolever, 1990s. "Let me die in Oklahoma/Lay me down in Tulsa Town."
- "Oklahoma" – Common Rotation, 1999. "There's a skyline in Oklahoma, stretches out over the corn."
- "Oklahoma" – written by John Allen and David Vincent Williams, recorded by Billy Gilman, 2000. "Son, we think we found your dad in Oklahoma."
- "Oklahoma" – Bob Schneider, 2001. "She came from Oklahoma, said the end of the world was on its way."
- "Oklahoma" – Van Zant, 2001. "Come Hell or come high water/We'll stand together in the rain/Oklahoma."
- "Oklahoma" – One-Eyed Jack, 2001/3. "Say you never get to heaven, Oklahoma's not that far."
- "Oklahoma" – Bathtub Mary, 2002. "Leavin' Oklahoma the car broke down."
- "Oklahoma" – Fred Gillen, Jr., 2002. "I'm not going down without a fight the like of which/will knock out every light/and burn out every switch in Oklahoma." Lyrics also quote a line from Oscar Hammerstein.
- "Oklahoma" – Darkest Hour, 2003. "Within a mechanical pose/And a heart pumping a need for control."
- "Oklahoma" – The Hard Chihuahuas, 2003. "I was raised in Eviston, Oklahoma....I'm comin' home, with a new way to look at the world."
- "Oklahoma?" – from the musical Dirty Rotten Scoundrels by David Yazbek, 2004. "And the shade is mighty thin in Oklahoma/And our leading cause of death is Melanoma."
- "Oklahoma" – The Answering Machine, 2006. "Oklahoma, she won't be your friend /She waits at the disco for her song to end."
- "Oklahoma" – Elvin Bishop, 2008. Blues autobiography: "I come all the way from Oklahoma."
- "Oklahoma" – Bishop Allen, 2009. "You've got eyes like Oklahoma/Learn to swim in Lake Texoma."
- "Oklahoma" – Willamena, 2013. "I'll be home soon, my Oklahoma's just on the rise."
- "Oklahoma" – written and recorded by Kalyn Fay, 2016. "Oh, my Oklahoma, I think I've known you too long."
- "Oklahoma" – written and performed by Keb' Mo', 2019. "Cowboys and Choctaws/Oklahoma/Chickasaws and outlaws/I can feel the sunshine/Sweeping through the plains/Jesus on the mainline/Devil stay away/Rain or shine/Oklahoma's gonna be okay."
- "Oklahoma" – written and performed by Jeremy Castle, 2023. "Oklahoma, you will always be home to me. Oklahoma, you're always where I wanna be no matter where I go."
- "Oklahoma" – Carly Pearce, 2024.“I might be in Oklahoma, but I'm not OK.”

- "Oklahoma 3/4 Moon" – see below, after "Oklahoma, That's for Me"
- "Oklahoma '41" – see below, after "Oklahoma Flower"
- "Oklahoma 1955" – see below, after "Oklahoma Nights"
- "Oklahoma, A Toast" – written by Harriet Parker Camden of Kingfisher, OK, in 1905. With additional music by Marie Crosby, adopted as the first official state song of Oklahoma in 1935. Replaced in 1953 as official state song by Rodgers and Hammerstein's "Oklahoma."
- "Oklahoma Annie" – Monty Harper and Evalyn Harper, 2007.
- "Oklahoma Baby" – Don Fowler and the Country Timers, 1966.
- "Oklahoma Baby" – Johnny & the Jailbirds, 1980.
- "Oklahoma Backroads" – Bill Caswell, 1980.
- "Oklahoma Backroom Dancer" – written by Michael Martin Murphey, recorded by the Monkees, 1969.
- "Oklahoma Bay" – written by John Möring, Detlef Reshöft and Reinhard Frantz, recorded by Peggy March, 1978. In German.
- "Oklahoma Bill" – written and recorded by Stuart Hamblen, 1952; later recorded by Jimmy Dean, 1961.
- "Oklahoma Blues" – at least nine different songs with this title have been recorded:

- "Oklahoma Blues" – written in 1928 and recorded several times by Frankie Marvin, sometimes using the name Frank Wallace; the oldest. Later recorded by Bill Boyd and His Cowboy Ramblers under the title "I've Got Those Oklahoma Blues" and more recently, with the original title, by Sourdough Slim (Rick Crowder) and by the Any Old Time String Band.
- "Oklahoma Blues" – Zeke Clements, 1947. Later also recorded by Luke Wills.
- "Oklahoma Blues" – Jimmy Wakely, 1948.
- "Oklahoma Blues" – Patti Page recorded this composition by her manager, Jack Rael, 1949.
- "Oklahoma Blues" – Ellis Walsh, 1950.
- "Oklahoma Blues" – Gene Chapman, 1962. Rockabilly.
- "Oklahoma Blues" – DeGarmo and Key, 1982. Christian rock.
- "Oklahoma Blues" – Steve Ripley, 2002.
- "Oklahoma Blues" – Watermelon Slim, 2003.
- "Oklahoma Blues" – Homer Joy, 2007. "Oklahoma is all I know, ... Oklahoma ain't perfect, but neither am I."

- "Oklahoma Bombs" – Delicate AWOL, 2002.
- "Oklahoma Boogie" – written by John Balogh, recorded by Louie Bashell, 1954.
- "Oklahoma Boogie" – Leon Russell, 2008.
- "Oklahoma Border" – R. David Cash, 2006.
- "Oklahoma Borderline" – Vince Gill, Guy Clark and Rodney Crowell co-wrote the song that was recorded by Gill in 1985.
- "Oklahoma Bound" – Paul Westmoreland, 1946. Also recorded by Bill Boyd and His Cowboy Ramblers, 1946.
- "Oklahoma Bound" – Homer Zeke Clemons, 1950.
- "Oklahoma Bound" – Joe West, 2005.
- "Oklahoma Bound" – written by Jerry Haire and Jerry Mosley, recorded by Krazy 4 Kuntry, 2006.
- "Oklahoma Bound" – written by Acie Cargill, recorded by Wes Reynolds, 2008.
- "Oklahoma Bound" – The Brian Collins Band, 2012.
- "Oklahoma Bound" – Alan Munde, recorded by him and Billy Bright, 2018. (The listed songs entitled "Oklahoma Bound" are seven completely different compositions.)
- "Oklahoma Boy Blues" – Jimmie Creswell, co-written with Sherman Bankston, 1970s?
- "Oklahoma Breakdown" – written by Michael Hosty. Recorded by the Hosty Duo, 2003, then by Stoney LaRue, 2006/7.
- "Oklahoma Broke My Heart" – Syd Masters and the Swing Riders, 2002.
- "Oklahoma by Night" – written and recorded by Kenny Feidler, 2010.
- "Oklahoma Charlie" – Bud Billings (Frank Luther) and Carson Robison, 1930.
- "Oklahoma Christmas" – Written by Rob Byus, Jenee Fleenor and Trent Willmon. Recorded by Blake Shelton and Reba McEntire, 2012.
- "Oklahoma Christmas Spirit" – Gannon/Lowe/Robin Ruddy, composers. Recorded by Dana Spencer, 2000.
- "Oklahoma City" – written by Fred Rose, recorded by Paul Howard and His Cotton Pickers, 1947.
- "Oklahoma City" – Nine Days, 1996.
- "Oklahoma City" – Kim Fowley, 1998.
- "Oklahoma City" – Argyle Street, 2008.
- "Oklahoma City" – Cake Bake Betty, 2008.
- "Oklahoma City" – written and recorded by Zach Bryan, 2020.
- "Oklahoma City Alarm Clock" – The Fixtures, 1996.
- "Oklahoma City Blues" – Jimmy Wakely. Wakely earlier recorded the song as "Oklahoma Blues." This one (with "City") is a little shorter, but has the same words and tune.
- "Oklahoma City Blues" – Neal Pattman, 1999. (Wakely's and Pattman's songs are two completely different compositions.)
- "Oklahoma City on the Radio" – written by Thomas E. Calame, recorded by Charley Austin, 2008.
- "Oklahoma City Times" – Written by Paul Hampton, recorded by Hamilton Camp, 1969, Bobby Sherman, 1970, Ray Peterson, 1970, and the Limeliters, 1987.
- "Oklahoma City Woman Blues" – Written by Matthew Campbell, recorded by his band The Deep Vibration, 2008.
- "Oklahoma Country" – Written by Rich Dodson, recorded by his band The Stampeders, 1971.
- "Oklahoma Country Girl" – Elvin Bishop, 1988.
- "Oklahoma Crude" – The Corbin/Hanner Band, 1981.
- "Oklahoma Daydreams" – Written by Jody Adams, recorded by his band Palmer Divide, 2008.
- "Oklahoma Dust" – writing credit to Vince Gill and Leslie Ann Winn, recorded by The Notorious Cherry Bombs, 2004.
- "Oklahoma Fields" – Chad Lewis, 2004.
- "Oklahoma Flower" – Ed and Jolene Bullard, 1983.
- "Oklahoma '41" – Mark Elliott, 2000/2002.
- "Oklahoma Gal" – Spade Cooley and Smokey Rogers, 1945.
- "Oklahoma Gal" – written by Tracy Byrd, Frank Dycus and Mark Nesler; recorded by Ray Pillow, 2004.
- "Oklahoma Gals" – Bob Wills, 1962.
- "Oklahoma Girl" – John Collins, 1995.
- "Oklahoma Girl" – written by band members Mike Eli (Diaz) and Jon Jones, recorded by the Eli Young Band, 2005.
- "Oklahoma Girl" – written and recorded by Leon Russell, 2007/8.
- "Oklahoma Girl" – Ahab, 2008.
- "Oklahoma Girl" – Susan Herndon, 2010. (The five songs listed with the title "Oklahoma Girl" are completely different compositions.)
- "Oklahoma Girls Are Still the Prettiest" – Jeremy Castle, 2019.
- "Oklahoma Going Home" – Kate Wolf, 1976.
- "Oklahoma Gypsy Shuffler" – Adam Carroll, 2008.
- "Oklahoma Heart" – Becky Hobbs, co-written by her, Byron Gallimore, Blake Mevis and William D. Shore, 1984.
- "Oklahoma Hell" – Written by Don Andrews and Sonny Bennett, recorded by Henson Cargill, 1972.
- "Oklahoma Heroes at the Library" – Monty Harper, 2007.
- "Oklahoma Hills" (Since 2001, Oklahoma's official folk song) – written by Woody Guthrie and Jack Guthrie, recorded by Jack, 1945.
- "Oklahoma Hills" – Kalyn Fay, 2019.
- "Oklahoma Home Brew" – Hank Thompson, co-written with William Penix, 1969.
- "Oklahoma, Home of Mine" – Loggins and Messina, 1977.
- "Oklahoma, Home of My Heart" – Curtis Leach, 1964.
- "Oklahoma Honky Tonk Gal" – Sheb Wooley, 1946.
- "Oklahoma, I Love You" – written by Opal Harrison Williford, arranged by Clarence Woods, 1938.
- "Oklahoma Indian Jazz" – written by Ray Hibbeler, T. J. Johnsen, J. W. Barna, T. Guarini, and J. J. Murrin. Recorded as an instrumental by the Benson Orchestra of Chicago, and with vocals by Jules Herbuveaux and his Guyon's Paradise Orchestra, 1923.
- "Oklahoma Is a State of Mind" – Peter Kalla, 2005.
- "Oklahoma is Callin' Me Home" – Melissa Black, 2012.
- "Oklahoma Joe" – written by Gil Milan, recorded by Chris LeDoux, 1974.
- "The Oklahoma Kid" – Goebel Reeves, "The Texas Drifter," 1930.
- "Oklahoma Kids, a Kaleidoscope" – Monty Harper, 2007.
- "Oklahoma Land" – Hank Harral, 1959.
- "Oklahoma, Land of the Sunny West" – Frankie Marvin, 1929.
- "Oklahoma Land Rush, 1889" – Monty Harper, 2007.
- "Oklahoma Lou" – Bob and Jim (The Tulsa Cowboys)–Bob Armstrong & Jim Childress, 1947.
- "Oklahoma Loves You" – Laura Cooper and the Honest Johns, 2011.
- "Oklahoma Lovin'" – The Swon Brothers, 2012.
- "An Oklahoma Lullaby," Greg Shelley, 2004.
- "Oklahoma Man Blues" – Lucille Bogan, 1927.
- "The Oklahoma Miner" – Kevin Danzig, 2007.
- "Oklahoma Moon" – Oscar Brand, 1949.
- "Oklahoma Moon" – Bill Snow, Jr., 2006.
- "Oklahoma Moon" – Chad Sullins and the Last Call Coalition, 2012.
- "Oklahoma Moon" – Michael Cooper, 2015. The four songs with the title "Oklahoma Moon" are all different compositions.
- "Oklahoma Morning" – written by Jim Chesnut, recorded by Charley Pride, 1975.
- "Oklahoma Music Shop" – Becky Hobbs, 2015.
- "Oklahoma, My Home" – George Dickey, 1999.
- "Oklahoma, My Native Land" – composed by Martha Kemm Barrett, 1994; declared Oklahoma's official children's song, 1996.
- "Oklahoma Nights" – written by Jimmy Webb, recorded by Arlo Guthrie, 1981.
- "Oklahoma Nights" – written by William Roy "Doc" Swicegood, recorded by Troy Aikman on the all-Dallas-Cowboy CD Everybody Wants to Be a Cowboy, 1993.
- "Oklahoma Nights" – Dryve, 1994.
- "Oklahoma – 1955" – Les Gilliam, 2009.
- "Oklahoma Polka" – written by Madeline Twomey, Ben Weisman and Elaine Wise, recorded by Georgia Gibbs, 1951.
- "Oklahoma Porch Song" – Brad Fielder, 2009.
- "Oklahoma Promise" – Red Steagall, 1972.
- "Oklahoma Rag" – Bob Wills, 1936.
- "Oklahoma Rising" – Vince Gill, co-written with Jimmy Webb.
- "Oklahoma Roots" – Mare Wakefield, 1997.
- "The Oklahoma Rose" – Percy French, 1910.
- "Oklahoma Rose" – Rex Allen, Jr., co-written with Judy Maude, 1980.
- "Oklahoma Rose" – written by Jesse McReynolds, recorded by Jim and Jesse, 1996.
- "Oklahoma Rose" – Freddy Pigg, 2007. The four "Oklahoma Rose" songs listed here are distinct compositions, as are the similarly titled "My Oklahoma Rose" (Montana Slim) and "Rose of Oklahoma" (Cowboy Copas).
- "Oklahoma Rounder" – Jimmie Revard and His Oklahoma Playboys, 1936.
- "Oklahoma Saturday Night" – John Nelson, 2011.
- "Oklahoma Shines" – written by Jerry Fuller, recorded by Mel McDaniel, 1989.
- "Oklahoma Skies" – Jody Stevens, 2005.
- "Oklahoma Skies" – written by Beau Bedford, recorded by Sarah Dye, 2011.
- "Oklahoma Sky" – Lexi Pierson, 2007.
- "Oklahoma Sky" – Jeremy Johnson, 2009.
- "Oklahoma Sky" – written by Allison Moorer, recorded by Miranda Lambert, 2011. Each of the "Oklahoma Skies" and "Oklahoma Sky" songs listed is a separate, distinct composition.
- "Oklahoma Song" – Hoyt Axton, 1973.
- "Oklahoma Sooner" – written by Mark McGuinn, Trey Matthews and David Chamberlain, recorded by Chamberlain, 2010.
- "Oklahoma Stardust Blues" – The Spikedrivers, 2003.
- "Oklahoma State of Mind" – Kane, 2000.
- "Oklahoma Stomp" – written by Irving Mills and Duke Ellington, performed by the Duke Ellington Orchestra (as "The Six Jolly Jesters"), 1929.
- "Oklahoma Stomp" – Spade Cooley, 1947.
- "Oklahoma Sunday Morning" – written by Albert Hammond, Mike Hazlewood and Tony Macaulay; recorded by Glen Campbell, 1971.
- "Oklahoma Sunset" – Travis Kidd, 2008.
- "Oklahoma Sunsets" – Hayden Miller, 2010.
- "Oklahoma Sunshine" – written by Bud Reneau and Hal Bynum, recorded by Waylon Jennings, 1974.
- "Oklahoma Sunshine" – written by Mike Settle, recorded by Jerry Reed, 1976.
- "Oklahoma Sunshine" – Scout Cloud Lee, 2005.
- "Oklahoma Superstar" – written by John Durrill, recorded by Brenda Lee, 1976.
- "Oklahoma Sweetheart" – George Thorogood, 1991.
- "Oklahoma Sweetheart Sally Ann" – Rose Maddox, 1950.
- "Oklahoma Swing" – written by Vince Gill and Tim DuBois, recorded by Gill with Reba McEntire, 1989.
- "Oklahoma Tape Deck" – Chris Brown and Kate Fenner, 1999.
- "Oklahoma Territory" – John Williams. Part of film score of Far and Away, 1992.
- "Oklahoma-Texas Line" – Rascal Flatts (Jay DeMarcus, Gary Levox and Joe Don Rooney), 2004.
- "Oklahoma, That's for Me" – Written by Peggy Johnson and Johnnie Lee Wills; recorded by Johnnie Lee Wills and His Boys, 1951.
- "Oklahoma 3/4 Moon" – John Sprott, 2006.
- "Oklahoma Tom" – written by Kurt Feltz and Heinz Geitz, recorded by Die Sieben Raben, 1956. In German.
- "Oklahoma Tornado" – Mickey Jones, 2009.
- "Oklahoma Town" – Jeremy Castle, 2012.
- "Oklahoma Towns" – written by Edna Mae Holden and Merele Harmon, recorded by R.W. Hampton with Rich O'Brien and the Enid Symphony Orchestra, 2007.
- "Oklahoma Twilight" – written and recorded by Wayne Parker, 1975. Recorded again by his nephew, Kevin Danzig, 2007/8.
- "Oklahoma Twister" – written by Max D. Barnes, recorded by Cal Smith, 1977.
- "Oklahoma U.S.A." – written by Ray Davies, performed by The Kinks, 1971.
- "Oklahoma Waltz" – Jack Perry & the Light Crust Doughboys, 1947.
- "Oklahoma Waltz"– co-written by Cindy Walker and Spade Cooley; recorded by the Spade Cooley Orchestra with vocal by Red Egner, 1948.
- "Oklahoma Waltz" – written by "Jimmy Kenton," a pseudonym for Johnny Bond; recorded by Johnny Bond with Dick Reinhart, 1948.
- "Oklahoma Waltz" – Byron Berline, 1990. Fiddle instrumental.
- "Oklahoma Waltz" – written by Kelly McCune, recorded by her band Border Radio, 2001.
- "Oklahoma Waltz" – written by Acie Cargill, recorded by him with Cindy Lee Ward, 2008.
- "Oklahoma Waltz" – Kenny Walters, 2015. (Each of the seven "Oklahoma Waltz" songs listed is a different composition.)
- "Oklahoma Wind" – written by Alan Rush and Dennis Linde, recorded by Mel McDaniel, 1978.
- "Oklahoma Wind" – written by Dale J. Smith. Designated the official Oklahoma State Waltz, 1982.
- "Oklahoma Wind" – written and sung by Billy Joe Shaver, 1982; he later recorded it with Waylon Jennings, 1993.
- "Oklahoma Wind" – written by lead singer Shaun Johnson for his a cappella group Tonic Sol-fa, 2001.
- "Oklahoma Wind" – Gretchen Anderson, 2003.
- "Oklahoma Wind" – Hunt Family Bluegrass, 2010. (Each of the six "Oklahoma Wind" songs listed is a different composition.)
- "Oklahoma Woman" – Roger Miller, 1977.
- "Oklahoma's Calling" – Jack Guthrie, 1946. (Uses the melody and most of the words of Jack Sutton's 1944 song, "Montana Cowboy")
- "Oklahoma's Going Dry" – I See Hawks In L.A., 2013.
- "Oklahoma's Home to Me" – George Highfill, 2002.
- "Old Oklahoma" – Frankie Yankovic recorded Johnny Bond's "Oklahoma Waltz" using this title, 1958. Dutch singer Ben Steneker also recorded it as "Old Oklahoma." Later released by Yankovic as "Old Oklahoma Waltz."
- "On the Oklahoma Prairie" – written by Acie Cargill, recorded by Kathy McMearty, 2008.
- "On the Road to Tulsa" – The Interociter.
- "Only Oklahoma Away" – Ken "Bucky" Jones and Claude "Curly" Putman, writers; recorded by John Conlee (1981), Leroy Van Dyke (1982), and Nat Stuckey (released posthumously—1998—after his death in 1988).
- "Osage Girl" – written and recorded by Jesse Aycock, 2006.
- "Osage Stomp" – Bob Wills, 1935.
- "Our Heart's in Oklahoma" – honoring the victims of the 1995 Murrah Building bombing. Lyrics written by Anita Bonita; tune drawn from the song "My Home's in Alabama" by Alabama; arranged by Dave Fields, 1995.
- "Our Lady of Oklahoma" – Peter Stampfel, 2009.
- "Outlaw Band" – Bob Childers, 1999. Co-written by Childers, Randy Crouch and Laile Stagner. Recorded again in 2005 by the Burtschi Brothers, then by Jason Boland & the Stragglers, 2008.

=== P ===
- "Passing Through Tulsa" – Tom Paxton, 1994.
- "Pink and Blue" – The Mountain Goats, 2001.
- "Pretty Boy Floyd" – Woody Guthrie, 1939.
- "Play a Little Haggard Just for Me" – Jeremy Castle, 2023.

=== Q ===
- "Queen of Oklahoma" – Patrick Bloom, 2008.
- "Queen of Oklahoma" – Carter Sampson, 2011.

=== R ===
- "Ragtime Cowboy Joe" – Pinky Tomlin recorded this 1912 composition in 1935 and again in 1938, changing "Arizona" to "Oklahoma" as the origin of the ragtime cowboy.
- "The Rain Don't Ever Stop in Oklahoma" – Red Steagall, 1978.
- "Ramblin' Oakie" – Written by Leodie Jackson, recorded by him and his "Western Swingsters" with vocal by Terry Fell, 1946.
- "Ramona" – Guster, 2003.
- "Rapid Roy (The Stock Car Boy)" – Jim Croce, 1972.
- "Red Durt" – Chop Chop, 2008.
- "Red River Blue" – duet recorded by Blake Shelton and Miranda Lambert, 2011; written by Buddy Owens and Ray Stephenson.
- "Rodeo", written by Larry Bastian, recorded by Garth Brooks, 1991.
- "Roll On Oklahoma" – Zach Swon, 2009.
- "Rollin' " – Bill Grant and Delia Bell, 1981.
- "Rollin' On Home for Christmas" – Written by Jim Carter and J.B. Smith, recorded by Gina Michaells, 2008. (The song's lyrics as recorded in 1999 by Myra Pearce did not mention Oklahoma.)
- "Rose of Oklahoma" – written by Rose E. Black, with additional writing credits to Cowboy Copas, Chaw Mank and Lew Mel (Louis Mulé); record released with vocal by Cowboy Copas, 1948.
- "Rough Wind in Oklahoma" – Michael Hedges, 1999.

=== S ===
- "The Sailor and the Oklahoma Girl" – Bruce Michael Miller, co-written with Ken Forsythe, 2001/2.
- "Sally Sue From Sallisaw" – written by Cindy Walker, recorded by Doye O'Dell, 1949.
- "She's a Real Gone Oakie" – written by Mary London (as " He's a Real Gone Oakie",) recorded by Deuce Spriggens, 1948.
- "She's An Okie" – written by Billy Hughes, recorded by Al Vaughn, 1948.
- "She's Got That Oklahoma Look" – written by Sanger D. Shafer, recorded by Moe Bandy, 1976.
- "Should've Spent More Time in Oklahoma" – John George Campbell, 2006.*"Sins of Oklahoma" – Written by Jason Glass and Zach Huckabee, recorded by the Zach Huckabee Band, 2010.
- "Skies Are Bluer" – written by Sanford Green and June Carroll for the 1945 movie The Man from Oklahoma, performed by Roy Rogers and the Sons of the Pioneers and other cast members in the film.
- "Slow Night, So Long" - written and recorded by Kings of Leon, 2004.
- "Small Town Oklahoma" – Mare Wakefield, 2011.
- "Soft Winds of Oklahoma" – written by Doyle Lawson, recorded by Bill Emerson, 1996. Banjo instrumental.
- "Southeast Oklahoma" – Clay Edwards, 2012.
- "Speedway Oklahoma" – Tyson Meade, leader of the Chainsaw Kittens, 1996.
- "Storm over Oklahoma" – written by Byron Berline and Dan Crary, performed by Sundance, 1976. Fiddle-guitar-banjo instrumental.
- "Stormclouds Over Tulsa" – Written by Bryce Martin, recorded by Marada Dunn (Brymar 5543), 1984. Godot Boys Music (BMI).
- "Sunday in Ponca City" – written by Michael and Sara Kathleen West, recorded by Truckstop Honeymoon, 2014.
- "Sweet Oklahoma" – Bill Caswell, 1980.

=== T ===
- "T-Town Blues" – Ernie Fields and His Orchestra, 1939. Written by Fields.
- "T Town Blues" – The Bays Brothers, 2004.
- "Take Her Back to Tulsa" – Kerry Grombacher, 2001.
- "Take Me Back to Oklahoma" – Redd Harper & The Flatlanders, 1948.
- "Take Me Back to Oklahoma" – Redd Stewart, 1991.
- "Take Me Back to Oklahoma" – written by Chubby Checker, Wade Boger and Gary Nutt, recorded by Chubby Checker, 1994.
- "Take Me Back to Oklahoma" – George Dickey, 2005.
- "Take Me Back to Oklahoma" – written by Charlie Hall, recorded by Henson Cargill, 2007. (Each of the five songs with the title "Take Me Back to Oklahoma" is a separate composition.)
- "Take Me Back to Tulsa" – Bob Wills/Tommy Duncan, 1941.
- "Taking Bob Back To Tulsa" – written by Richard E. O'Brien, recorded by Gary P. Nunn, 2000.
- "Talihina Sky" – written by Angelo Petraglia, Caleb Followill and Nathan Followill, recorded by Kings of Leon, 2003.
- "Tampa to Tulsa" – written by Tim O'Reagan, recorded with his band The Jayhawks, 2003.
- "Tear Drops in Tulsa" – Mustang Mesa, 2000.
- "Teardrops in Tulsa" – Jason Stringfellow Band, 2013.
- "Tell Me Something Bad About Tulsa" – written by Red Lane, recorded by Merle Haggard, 1986, Noel Haggard, 1997, and George Strait, 2003.
- "Ten Miles to Tulsa" – written by Billy & Liza (William Nershi and Elizabeth Oxnard), recorded by them with the String Cheese Incident, 2001.
- "Texas and Oklahoma" – Freddy Powers, 1987.
- "Them Tulsa Boys" – Paul Benjaman Band, 2012.
- "They've Taken Bob Back to Tulsa" – original title of song written by Richard E. O'Brien; recorded as "Taking Bob Back to Tulsa" by Gary P. Nunn, 2000 (see above) and as "We've Taken Bob Back to Tulsa" by R.W. Hampton, 2007 (see below).
- "Those Oklahoma Bluegrass Blues" – Bill Grant and Delia Bell & the Kiamichi Mountain Boys.
- "Three Good Reasons" – Jacob Tovar, 2015.
- "Tokyo, Oklahoma" – John Anderson, written by Mack Vickery, 1985.
- "Tornado Season in Tulsa" – Emily Kaitz, 2001.
- "Town in Oklahoma" — Wink Burcham, 2012.
- "La Tragedia de Oklahoma" – written by Valle y Oro, recorded by Silvano Ramos and Ortega, 1931.
- "Truth" – Jimmy Lafave, 2007.
- "Tucker's Knob" – Bill Grant and Delia Bell, 2003.
- "Tulsa" – Jerry Merritt and the Crowns, 1964.
- "Tulsa" – Travis Linville and the Burtschi Brothers, 2000/1.
- "Tulsa" – Casey Donahew, 2006.
- "Tulsa" – Wayne "The Train" Hancock, 2006.
- "Tulsa" – Rufus Wainwright, 2007.
- "Tulsa" – Kalyn Fay, 2016. (Each of the six songs with the title "Tulsa" is a completely different composition.)
- ”Tulsa” - 49 Winchester, 2024.
- "Tulsa Baby" – written by Dave Stogner and Jim Childress, recorded by Dave Stogner, 1950, and by him again in 1951.
- "Tulsa Baby" – written by Louie Walker, recorded by the Miller Brothers, 1955. Later recorded by Deke Dickerson, 1998.
- "Tulsa Ballroom" – Dottie West, written by Dewayne Blackwell and John Durrill, 1983.
- "Tulsa County" – written by Pamela Polland; recorded by Ry Cooder and Taj Mahal as part of the group Rising Sons, 1966—but not released until 1992; by The Byrds, 1969; by Anita Carter,1970; and by Son Volt, 2005.
- "Tulsa Girl" – Dwight Twilley, 1976.
- "Tulsa Girl" – The Greyhounds, 2008.
- "Tulsa Girl" – written by Angel Z. Angelov and Douglas "Katch" Gray, recorded by Katch Gray, 2013.
- "Tulsa Imperative" – written by John Darnielle for The Mountain Goats, unreleased; recorded by DiskothiQ, 1994.
- "Tulsa, Oklahoma" – written by Jesper Jelse, Marina Ljung, and Stefan Andersson, recorded by Shebang, 2003.
- "Tulsa on a Saturday Night" – written and recorded by Benny Kubiak as a fiddle tune, 1975; lyrics by Walt Wilder, recorded by vocalist Ronnie McClendon with Benny Kubiak on fiddle, 1975.
- "Tulsa Queen" – written by Emmylou Harris and Rodney Crowell, recorded by Emmylou, 1977.
- "Tulsa Riots" – written by Jacob, Bethany and Michael Latham, recorded by them as Blue Cut, 2010.
- "Tulsa Shuffle" – Elvin Bishop, 1969.
- "The Tulsa Shuffle" – written by Steve Ripley, recorded by his band The Tractors, 1994.
- "Tulsa Sound" – written and recorded by Beau Jennings, 2008.
- "Tulsa Sounds Like Trouble to Me" – Shawn Camp, co-written with Mark Sanders, 2006. Also recorded by the Nitty Gritty Dirt Band, 2009.
- "Tulsa Straight Ahead" – Jimmy Hall, fiddler and vocalist with Leon McAuliffe and His Cimarron Boys, recorded by them, 1947.
- "Tulsa Sunday" – written and recorded by Lee Hazlewood, 1972.
- "Tulsa Telephone Book" – written and recorded by Tom T. Hall, 1971; also recorded by Calexico, 1998.
- "Tulsa Time" – written by Danny Flowers, recorded by Don Williams, Eric Clapton, and Reba McEntire, among others. Flowers was the guitarist in the Williams band; the Williams and Clapton recordings were both released in 1978.
- "Tulsa Town" — written and recorded by Dwight Twilley, 2011.
- "Tulsa Turnaround" – written by Larry Collins and Alex Harvey, recorded by Kenny Rogers and the First Edition, 1971.
- "Tulsa Twist" – written by Buddy Ray, recorded by Dickie McBride, 1941. Instrumental.
- "Tulsa Twist" – written and recorded by Speedy West, 1962. Instrumental.
- "Tulsa Waltz" – Jimmie Revard & His Oklahoma Playboys, 1937/8. Instrumental.
- "Twenty Four Hours from Tulsa" — written by Burt Bacharach and Hal David, recorded by Gene Pitney, 1963.

=== U ===
- "Up Against the Wall, Redneck Mother" – written by Ray Wylie Hubbard, recorded by Jerry Jeff Walker, 1973.

=== V ===
- "The Verdigris" – written and recorded by Beau Jennings, 2015.

=== W ===
- "Waltz of the Arbuckles" — Benny Kubiak, 1975. Instrumental.
- "Wanderin' Oakie" – written by Wayne Walker and Eddie Noack, recorded by Noack, 1955; not released until 1985.
- "Way Back in Oklahoma" – written by Johnny Bond, recorded by him as a member of the Jimmy Wakely Trio (using the name "The Rough Riders"), 1939.
- "We've Taken Bob Back to Tulsa" – R.W. Hampton with Rich O'Brien and the Enid Symphony Orchestra, 2007.
- "West of Tulsa" – Bill Caswell, 1980.
- "What if I Die Flying Over Oklahoma?" – Rae Isla, 2025.
- "Wheat King of Oologah" — Beau Jennings, 2015.
- "When I Can See the Wichitas" – Phil Sampson 1999.
- "Where the Arkansas River Leaves Oklahoma" – written by Wayland Holyfield, recorded by Don Williams, 1976.
- "The Wind Blows Every Day in Oklahoma" – written and recorded by Buck Owens, 1970.
- "The Wind of Oklahoma" – written by Dallas Frazier, recorded by the Mills Brothers, 1970, and by Tex Ritter, 1972.
- "Winds of Oklahoma" – written and recorded by Andy Germak, 2000.

=== Y ===
- "You're the Reason God Made Oklahoma" – Introduced in the motion picture Any Which Way You Can. Written by James "Sandy" Pinkard, Larry Collins, and Felice and Boudleaux Bryant, performed by David Frizzell and Shelly West, 1980.

== See also ==
- Music of Oklahoma
