= How Do You Sleep at Night =

Single by Wade Hayes

from the album When the Wrong One Loves You Right
- Released: July 4, 1998
- Genre: Country
- Length: 3:25
- Label: Columbia Nashville
- Songwriters: Jim McBride; Jerry Salley
- Producer: Don Cook

Wade Hayes singles chronology
"When the Wrong One Loves You Right" (1998)	"How Do You Sleep at Night" (1998)	"Tore Up from the Floor Up" (1999)

"How Do You Sleep at Night" is a song written by Jim McBride and Jerry Salley, and recorded by American country music artist Wade Hayes. It was released in July 1998 as the third single from his album When the Wrong One Loves You Right. The song reached number 13 on the Billboard Hot Country Singles & Tracks chart in November 1998. It is his final Top 40 Hit to date.

== Critical reception ==
Deborah Evans Price of Billboard gave the song a favorable review, writing that "with each successive release [Hayes] seems to grow more confident in his smoky baritone, and he imbues this taut single with a tense passion that perfectly suits the lyric."

== Chart performance ==
Chart (1998)	Peak position
Canada Country Singles (RPM)	30
US Billboard Hot 100	67
US Hot Country Songs (Billboard)	13
