= Jim McBride (songwriter) =

American country music songwriter (1947–2026)

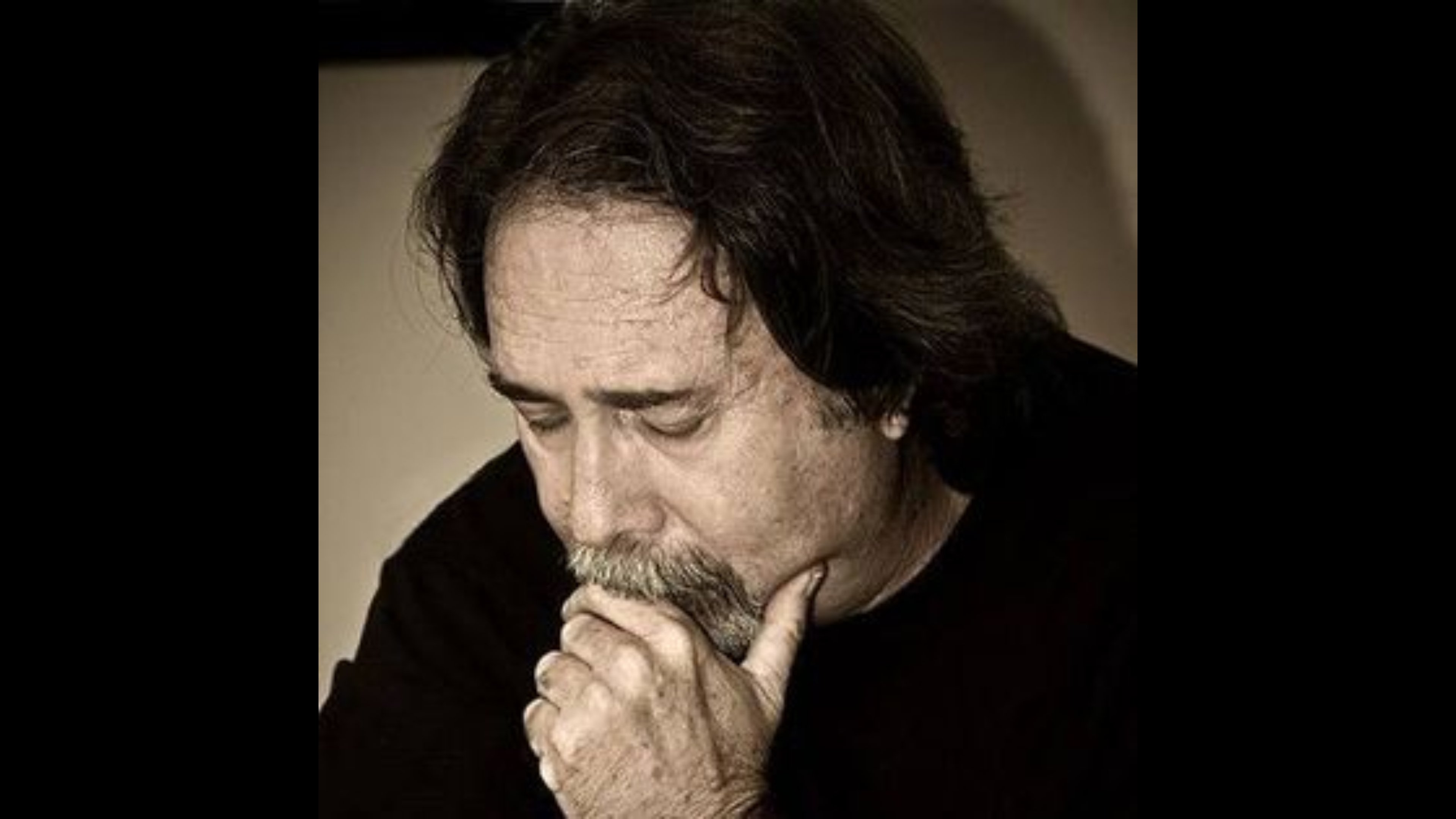
- McBride in 2021

Background information
- Born: Jimmy Ray McBride; April 28, 1947; Huntsville, Alabama, U.S.
- Died: January 7, 2026 (aged 78)
- Genres: Country, gospel, bluegrass
- Occupation: Songwriter
- Years active: 1968–2026

Jimmy Ray McBride (April 28, 1947 – January 7, 2026) was an American country music songwriter. He has written five number one songs, ten top 10 singles, and eighteen top 40 singles. In 2017, McBride was inducted into the Nashville Songwriters Hall of Fame.

McBride's songs have been recorded by more than eighty major artists, including Alabama, Trace Adkins, Johnny Cash, Tammy Cochran, Diamond Rio, Crystal Gayle, Vern Gosdin, Jack Greene, Wade Hayes, Waylon Jennings, George Jones, Toby Keith, Kris Kristofferson, Johnny Lee, Jerry Lee Lewis, Lonestar, Reba McEntire, Willie Nelson, the Oak Ridge Boys, Johnny Paycheck, Charley Pride, Pam Tillis, Randy Travis, Conway Twitty, and Keith Whitley.

His most successful collaboration was with Alan Jackson, resulting in the five Top 20 singles and the chart-topping songs "Chasing That Neon Rainbow", "(Who Says) You Can’t Have It All", and "Someday". Their song "Chattahoochee" was selected as song of the year by ASCAP, American Songwriter, and the Country Music Association.

== Early life ==
McBride was born in Huntsville, Alabama, on April 28, 1947. His parents were James Alvin and Helen Hillis McBride. His grandfather was a sharecropper in Alabama. McBride grew up listening to country music on WBHP with his mother. On Saturday nights, his entire family listened to the Grand Ole Opry.

He attended Rison Elementary, and Lee Junior High, before graduating from Lee High School in 1965.

McBride spent his younger years reading about songs, especially in the magazine Country Song Roundup. His favorite writers were Hank Williams and Don Gibson. He wrote his first song when he was twelve years old and began writing full-time at eighteen.

In the 1970s, McBride brought his songs to Curly Putman, a fellow songwriter from Alabama who had started Tree Publishing in Nashville, Tennessee. Putman became McBride's mentor and friend. In the early 1970s, The Hagers recorded five of his songs and performed them on the television show Hee Haw. However, McBride did not make money from these recordings.

Frustrated by his lack of success selling songs, McBride stopped writing. He worked for the U.S. Post Office for fourteen years. In 1980, McBride told co-writer Roger Murrah that he would quit his job and move to Nashville if their song "A Bridge That Just Won't Burn" was recorded as a single. McBride says, "Roger called me one night and said 'I guess you need to pack your bags, we've got Conway's next single.' I quit the post office the day after Christmas, 1980 ...".

== Career ==
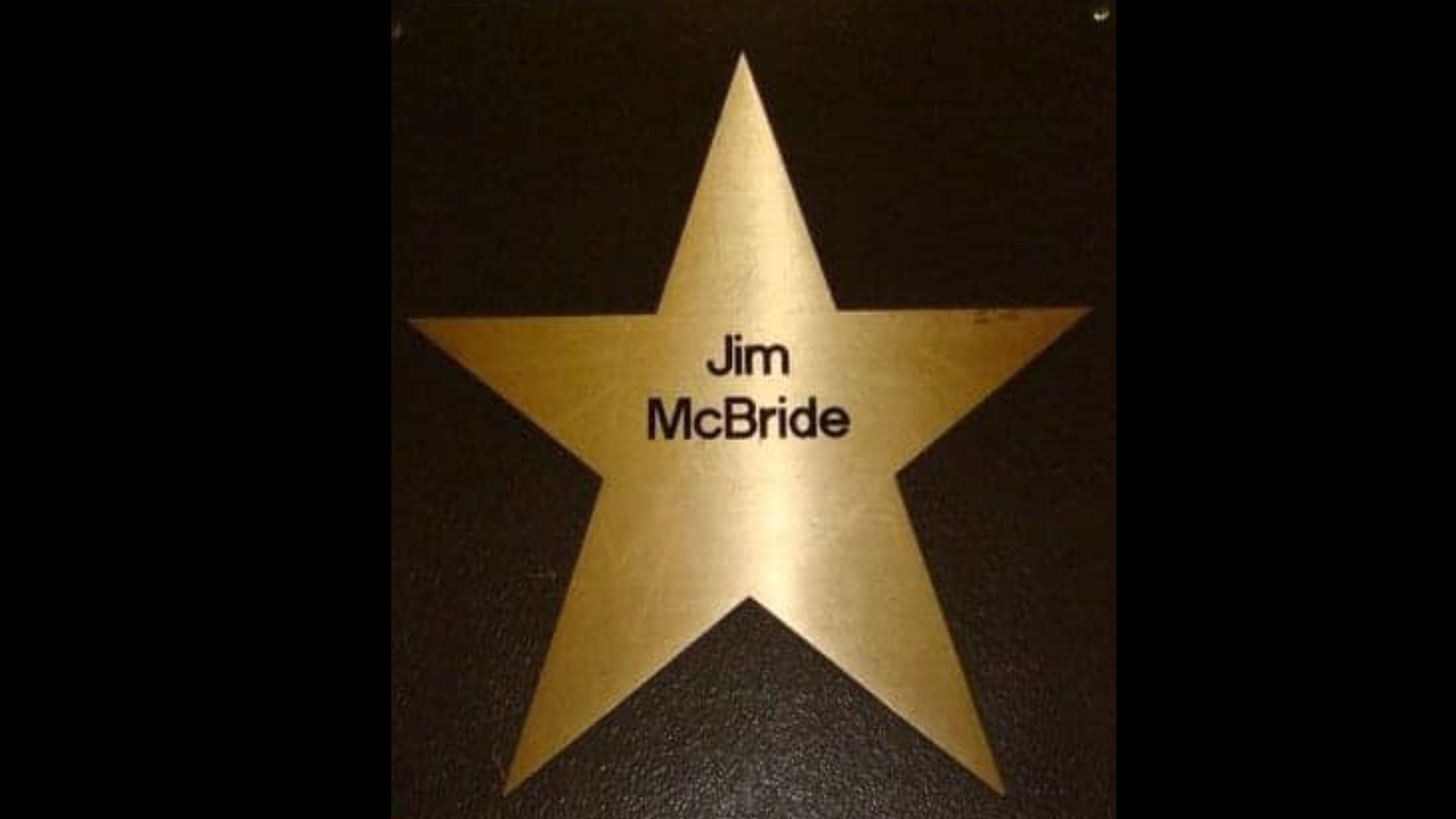
McBride's Alabama Music Hall of Fame star.

Conway Twitty released McBride's song, "A Bridge That Just Won't Burn", in October 1980. The song entered the Billboard Hot Country Songs chart at number 62 the week of October 18, 1980. It stayed on the chart for seventeen consecutive weeks, peaking at number three the week of January 10, 1981. It won the BMI Country Award in 1981.

In January 1981, McBride started working as a songwriter for Bill Rice and Jerry Foster, along with Roger Murrah. McBride's first number one song on Billboard's Hot Country Songs Chart was "Bet Your Heart on Me" recorded by Johnny Lee and released in September 1981. Lee's recording entered Billboard Hot Country Songs at number 55 the week of October 3, 1981, staying there for fifteen consecutive weeks and peaking at number one the week on December 5, 1981. It also made the Billboard Hot 100 chart, entering at number 84 the week of October 10, 1981, and peaking at number 54 on November 14, 1981.

In March 1983, the country band Alabama released McBride's song, "Dixie Boy", on their album The Closer You Get... Although McBride's song was not a hit, the album stayed on Billboard's Top Country Albums chart for 206 weeks. It was also the Country Music Association's Album of the Year.

In 1987, Waylon Jennings released "Rose in Paradise", a song McBride co-wrote with Stewart Harris. "Rose in Paradise" would rise to number one on Billboard's Hot Country Songs Chart in April 1987. This success led publisher Charlie Monk and CBS Songs to buy McBride's contract from Jerry Foster. Also in 1987, George Jones recorded "I'm a Survivor", a song McBride co-wrote with Keith Stegall, for the album titled Too Wild Too Long.

In 1988, McBride met Alan Jackson, a young singer newly arrived in Nashville. The two began writing songs together; Jackson became McBride's most frequent collaborator during the 1990s and the 2000s. Jackson recorded their song "Chasin' That Neon Rainbow" and released it as a single in 1989, with another song written by the pair, "Short Sweet Ride", on the B-Side. "Chasin' That Neon Rainbow" peaked number two on the Billboard Hot Country Songs chart in December 1990. The song was also included on Jackson's album, Here in the Real World, released in February 1990, along with two other songs written by McBride and Jackson. Although the album peaked at number 57 on the Billboard Top Country Albums chart, it went Multi-Platinum and was the 1991 TNN Music City News Country Awards Album of the Year.

While writing with Jackson, McBride wrote songs recorded by Aaron Tippin, Randy Travis, Travis Tritt, and Conway Twitty. Then, McBride and Jackson co-wrote "Someday", released by Jackson as a single in 1991. "Someday" entered Billboard's Country Airplay chart and Billboard Hot Country Songs chart at number fifty the week of August 31, 1991, and stayed on the charts for twenty consecutive weeks. It reached number one on both charts the week of November 9, 1991.

In 1992, McBride and Jackson co-wrote "Chattahoochee". Jackson's recording of the song entered Billboard's Country Airplay chart and Billboard's Hot Country Songs chart at number 72 the week of May 15, 1993. It reached number one on both charts the week of July 17, 1993, and stayed there for four consecutive weeks. "Chattahoochee" won the Academy of Country Music Awards Single Record of the Year, the American Music Awards Favorite Country Single, ASCAP Country Award Song of the Year, Country Music Association Awards Single of the Year, Country Music Association Awards Song of the Year, and the TNN Music City News Country Awards Single of the Year.

"Chattahoochee" was included on Jackson's album, A Lot About Livin' (And a Little 'bout Love) along with three other songs by the songwriting duo, "(Who Says) You Can't Have It All", "Tropical Depression", and "If It Ain't One Thing (It's You)". "(Who Says) You Can't Have It All" peaked at number four on Billboard's Country Airplay Hot Country Songs chart in April 1993. "Tropical Depression" peaked at number 75 on Billboard's Hot Country Songs chart in August 1993. The album entered the charts on October 24, 1992, ranking number 84 on Billboard's 200, Top Album Sales, and Top Current Albums charts; in addition to number 24 on Top Country Albums. It stayed on the Top Country Albums chart for 159 consecutive weeks, reaching number one the week of August 14, 1993.

McBride co-wrote "What I Meant To Say" which was recorded by Wade Hayes in 1995. The song was a Top 10 single and won the 1996 BMI Country Award. Tammy Cochran recorded "Angels In Waiting" in 2001, a song she co-wrote with McBride and Stewart Harris. The song was a Top 10 single and won the 2002 BMI Country Award.

He served as the president of the Nashville Songwriters Association.

== Personal life and death ==
McBride married and lived in Huntsville, Alabama. They had two sons, Brent and Wes. In January 1981, McBride and his family moved to Franklin, Tennessee, so he could write songs in Nashville. McBride's second wife, Jeanne Ivey, is a former elementary and high school classmate. They lived in Hazel Green, Alabama, on land once farmed by his grandfather.

McBride died January 7, 2026, at the age of 78.

== Awards and honors ==
- 1981 – BMI Country Award: "Bridge That Just Won't Burn" by Conway Twitty, co-written by McBride and Roger Murrah
- 1983 – Country Music Association Awards, Album of the Year: The Closer You Get by Alabama. McBride wrote "Dixie Boy".
- 1988 – BMI Country Award: "Rose in Paradise" by Waylon Jennings, co-written by McBride and Stewart Harris
- 1991 – TNN Music City News Country Awards, Album of the Year: Here in the Real World by Alan Jackson. McBride wrote "Chasin' That Neon Rainbow", "She Don't Get the Blues", and "Short Sweet Ride"
- 1992 – TNN Music City News Country Awards, Album of the Year: Don't Rock the Jukebox by Alan Jackson. McBride wrote "That's All I Need to Know", "Someday", and "Just Playin' Possum"
- 1993 – Academy of Country Music Awards, Single Record of the Year: “Chattahoochee” by Alan Jackson, co-written by McBride and Jackson
- 1993 – Academy of Country Music Awards, Album of the Yearr: A Lot About Livin' (And a Little 'bout Love) by Alan Jackson. McBride co-wrote "Chattahoochee", "(Who Says) You Can't Have It All", "Tropical Depression", and "If It Ain't One Thing (It's You)".
- 1993 – American Music Awards, Favorite Country Single: “Chattahoochee” by Alan Jackson, co-written by McBride and Jackson
- 1993 – American Music Awards, Favorite Country Album: A Lot About Livin' (And a Little 'bout Love) by Alan Jackson
- 1994 – ASCAP Country Award, Song of the Year: "Chattahoochee" by Alan Jackson, co-written by McBride and Jackson
- 1993 – Country Music Association Awards, Single of the Year: “Chattahoochee” by Alan Jackson, co-written by McBride and Jackson.
- 1994 – Country Music Association Awards, Song of the Year: “Chattahoochee” by Alan Jackson, co-written by McBride and Jackson
- 1994 – TNN Music City News Country Awards, Single of the Year: "Chattahoochee" by Alan Jackson, co-written by McBride and Jackson.
- 1994 – TNN Music City News Country Awards, Video of the Year: "Chattahoochee" by Alan Jackson, co-written by McBride and Jackson
- 1994 – TNN Music City News Country Awards, Album of the Year: A Lot About Livin' (And a Little 'Bout Love) by Alan Jackson
- 1995 – Alabama Music Hall of Fame, Creator's Award
- 1995 – TNN Music City News Country Awards, Album of the Year: Who I Am by Alan Jackson. McBride wrote "Hole in the Wall" and "If I Had You"
- 1996 – BMI Country Award: "What I Meant to Say" by Wade Hayes. Co-written by McBride, Don Cook and Sam Hogin
- 2002 – BMI Country Award for "Angels in Waiting" by Tammy Cochran. Co-written by McBride, Cochran, and Stewart Harris
- 2004 – Canadian Country Music Awards, Top Selling Album: Greatest Hits Volume II by Alan Jackson. McBride wrote "Tropical Depression", "Hole in the Wall", and "Buicks to the Moon".
- 2017 – Nashville Songwriters Hall of Fame

== RIAA certification ==
The Recording Industry Association of America (RIAA) awards certification based on the number of singles and albums sold. Gold status indicates 500,000 units sold. Platinum status indicates 1,000,000 units sold. Multi-Platinum status indicates 2,000,000 + units sold, with a new certification for every increase in a million units.

Artist	Title	Format	Release	Gold	Platinum	Multi-Platinum		Songs by McBride
Alan Jackson	Here In the Real World	Album	2/27/1990	9/12/1990	3/12/1991	2x	8/10/1994	"Chasin' That Neon Rainbow"
Alan Jackson	Here In the Real World	Album	2/27/1990	9/12/1990	3/12/1991	2x	8/10/1994	"She Don't Get the Blues"
Alan Jackson	Here In the Real World	Album	2/27/1990	9/12/1990	3/12/1991	2x	8/10/1994	"Short Sweet Ride"
Alan Jackson	Here In the Real World	Video Longform	11/6/1990	1/22/1992				"Chasin' That Neon Rainbow"
Alan Jackson	Don't Rock the Jukebox	Album	5/14/1991	7/19/1991	10/25/1991	2x	8/26/1992	"That's All I Need To Know"
Alan Jackson	Don't Rock the Jukebox	Album	5/14/1991	7/19/1991	10/25/1991	3x	11/29/1994	"Someday"
Alan Jackson	Don't Rock the Jukebox	Album	5/14/1991	7/19/1991	10/25/1991	4x	4/5/1995	"Just Playin' Possum"
Alan Jackson	A Lot About Livin' (and a Little 'Bout Love)	Album	9/30/1992	12/1/1992	12/3/1992	2x	8/11/1993	"Chattahoochee"
Alan Jackson	A Lot About Livin' (and a Little 'Bout Love)	Album	9/30/1992	12/1/1992	12/3/1992	3x	12/1/1993	"(Who Says) You Can't Have It All"
Alan Jackson	A Lot About Livin' (and a Little 'Bout Love)	Album	9/30/1992	12/1/1992	12/3/1992	4x	9/13/1994	"Tropical Depression"
Alan Jackson	A Lot About Livin' (and a Little 'Bout Love)	Album	9/30/1992	12/1/1992	12/3/1992	5x	4/5/1995	"If It Ain't One Thing (It's You)"
Alan Jackson	A Lot About Livin' (and a Little 'Bout Love)	Album	9/30/1992	12/1/1992	12/3/1992	6x	7/16/1995	
Alan Jackson	Livin', Lovin', and Rockin' That Jukebox	Video Longform	10/26/1993	1/5/1994	6/21/1994			"Someday"
Alan Jackson	Livin', Lovin', and Rockin' That Jukebox	Video Longform	10/26/1993	1/5/1994	6/21/1994			"Chattahoochee"
Alan Jackson	"Chattahoochee"	Single	5/21/1993	12/1/1993				
Alan Jackson	Who I Am	Album	6/28/1994	8/30/1994	8/30/1994	2x	2/14/1995	"Hole in the Wall"
Alan Jackson	Who I Am	Album	6/28/1994	8/30/1994	8/30/1994	3x	5/30/1995	"If I Had You"
Alan Jackson	Who I Am	Album	6/28/1994	8/30/1994	8/30/1994	4x	1/13/1999	
Alan Jackson	Everything I Love	Album	10/29/1996	2/21/1997	2/21/1997	2x	1/26/1998	"Buicks to the Moon"
Alan Jackson	Everything I Love	Album	10/29/1996	2/21/1997	2/21/1997	3x	8/1/2001	"A House with no Curtains"
Alan Jackson	Greatest Hits Collection	Album	10/24/1995	1/3/1996	1/3/1996			"Chattahoochee" (Extended Mix)
Alan Jackson	Greatest Hits Collection	Album	10/24/1995	1/3/1996	1/3/1996			"Chasin' That Neon Rainbow"
Alan Jackson	Greatest Hits Collection	Album	10/24/1995	1/3/1996	1/3/1996			"(Who Says) You Can't Have It All"
Alan Jackson	Greatest Hits Collection	Album	10/24/1995	1/3/1996	1/3/1996			"Someday"
Alan Jackson	Greatest Hits Collection	Video Longform	11/21/1995	12/22/1999	12/22/1999			"Chattahoochee" (Extended Mix)
Alan Jackson	Greatest Hits Collection	Video Longform	11/21/1995	12/22/1999	12/22/1999			"Chasin' That Neon Rainbow"
Alan Jackson	Greatest Hits Collection	Video Longform	11/21/1995	12/22/1999	12/22/1999			"(Who Says) You Can't Have It All"
Alan Jackson	Greatest Hits Collection	Video Longform	11/21/1995	12/22/1999	12/22/1999			"Someday"
Alan Jackson	34 Number Ones	Album	11/22/2010	2/15/2011		2x	1/3/1996	"Chasin' That Neon Rainbow"
Alan Jackson	34 Number Ones	Album	11/22/2010	2/15/2011		3x	4/6/1996	"Someday"
Alan Jackson	34 Number Ones	Album	11/22/2010	2/15/2011		4x	3/31/1998	"Chattahoochee"
Alan Jackson	34 Number Ones	Album	11/22/2010	2/15/2011		5x	10/19/2001	"(Who Says) You Can't Have It All"
Alan Jackson	34 Number Ones	Album	11/22/2010	2/15/2011		6x	10/20/2006	
Wade Hayes	Old Enough To Know Better	Album	12/20/1994	9/5/1995				"What I Meant to Say"
Diamond Rio	Close to the Edge	Album	10/27/1992	1/26/1994				"Sawmill Road"
Conway Twitty	Number Ones	Album	5/6/1982	11/29/1988				"A Bridge That Just Won't Burn"
Aaron Tippin	Read Between the Lines	Album	3/10/1992	7/22/1992	7/19/1993			"I Was Born With A Broken Heart"
Alabama	The Closer You Get	Album	3/1/1983	5/3/1983	5/3/1983	2x	10/25/1984	"Dixie Boy"
Alabama	The Closer You Get	Album	3/1/1983	5/3/1983	5/3/1983	3x	7/30/1985	"Dixie Boy"
Alabama	The Closer You Get	Album	3/1/1983	5/3/1983	5/3/1983	4x	9/30/1996	"Dixie Boy"

== See also ==
- List of songs written by Jim McBride
