= When the Wrong One Loves You Right =

Studio album by Wade Hayes
- Released: January 27, 1998
- Recorded: 1997
- Studio: Emerald Sound Studios, Sound Shop, and Sony/Tree Studios Nashville, TN
- Genre: Country
- Length: 33:05
- Label: Columbia Nashville
- Producer: Don Cook

Wade Hayes chronology
On a Good Night (1996)	When the Wrong One Loves You Right (1998)	Highways & Heartaches (2000)

Singles from When the Wrong One Loves You Right
- 1. "The Day That She Left Tulsa (In a Chevy)" Released: November 18, 1997; 2. "When the Wrong One Loves You Right" Released: 1998; 3. "How Do You Sleep at Night" Released: July 4, 1998; 4. "Tore Up from the Floor Up" Released: 1998

Professional ratings
Review scores
Source	Rating
Allmusic	3/5 stars

When the Wrong One Loves You Right is the third studio album by American country music artist Wade Hayes. Released in January 1998 as his final album for Columbia Records Nashville, it includes the singles "The Day That She Left Tulsa (In a Chevy)" and "How Do You Sleep at Night", which peaked at #5 and #13, respectively, on the Billboard Hot Country Singles & Tracks (now Hot Country Songs) charts. Also released were the title track and "Tore Up from the Floor Up", neither of which reached the Top 40.

The album was originally to have been released in 1997 under the title Tore Up from the Floor Up, with a cover of Glen Campbell's "Wichita Lineman" serving as the lead-off single. After this cover failed to reach Top 40, however, it was replaced with "The Day That She Left Tulsa" and the album was re-titled, with "Wichita Lineman" not making the album's final cut.

The track "Summer Was a Bummer" was previously cut by Ty Herndon on his 1995 debut album What Mattered Most.

== Track listing ==
No.	Title	Writer(s)	Length
1.	"When the Wrong One Loves You Right"	Leslie Satcher	2:30
2.	"How Do You Sleep at Night"	Jim McBride, Jerry Salley	3:25
3.	"The Day That She Left Tulsa (In a Chevy)"	Mark D. Sanders, Steve Diamond	3:33
4.	"Are We Having Fun Yet"	Wade Hayes, Chick Rains, Lonnie Wilson	3:16
5.	"This Is My Heart Talking Now"	Jason Sellers, Lewis Anderson	3:32
6.	"One More Night with You"	Hayes, Rains, Don Cook	3:57
7.	"Summer Was a Bummer"	Hank Cochran, Dean Dillon	3:22
8.	"Tore Up from the Floor Up"	J. B. Rudd, Bob Regan	3:04
9.	"If I Wanted to Forget"	Chris Waters, Tom Shapiro	3:03
10.	"Mine to Lose"	Larry Boone, Paul Nelson, Matt King	3:23

== Personnel ==
As listed in liner notes.

- Bruce Bouton – pedal steel guitar, lap steel guitar
- Mark Casstevens – acoustic guitar
- Larry Franklin – fiddle, mandolin
- Wade Hayes – lead vocals, background vocals, electric guitar
- John Barlow Jarvis – piano, keyboards, Hammond organ
- Liana Manis – background vocals
- Brent Mason – electric guitar, gut-string guitar, 6-string bass guitar
- Joey Miskulin – accordion
- Michael Rhodes – bass guitar
- John Wesley Ryles – background vocals
- Dennis Wilson – background vocals
- Lonnie Wilson – drums, percussion
- Glenn Worf – bass guitar

== Chart performance ==
Chart (1998)	Peak position
U.S. Billboard Top Country Albums	9
U.S. Billboard 200	92
Canadian RPM Country Albums	22
