= Highways & Heartaches =

Highways & Heartaches may refer to:

- Highways & Heartaches (Wade Hayes album), 2000
- Highways & Heartaches (Ricky Skaggs album), 1982
