= On a Good Night =

Studio album by Wade Hayes
- Released: June 25, 1996
- Genre: Country
- Length: 33:52
- Label: Columbia Nashville
- Producer: Don Cook

Wade Hayes chronology
Old Enough to Know Better (1995)	On a Good Night (1996)	When the Wrong One Loves You Right (1998)

Singles from On a Good Night
- 1. "On a Good Night" Released: May 7, 1996; 2. "Where Do I Go to Start All Over" Released: October 8, 1996; 3. "It's Over My Head" Released: January 7, 1997

Professional ratings
Review scores
Source	Rating
Allmusic	3/5 stars

On a Good Night is the second studio album by American country music artist Wade Hayes. Released in 1996 on Columbia Records Nashville, it produced a #2-peaking single on the Billboard Hot Country Singles & Tracks (now Hot Country Songs) charts in its title track that year. Like his previous album Old Enough to Know Better, On a Good Night also received gold certification in the U.S. for sales of more than 500,000 copies.

"Undo the Right" was previously recorded by Willie Nelson on his 1962 album And Then I Wrote, "Hurts Don't It" by Greg Holland on his 1994 debut album Let Me Drive, and "Our Time Is Coming" by Brooks & Dunn on their 1993 album Hard Workin' Man.

== Track listing ==
No.	Title	Writer(s)	Length
1.	"On a Good Night"	Larry Boone, Don Cook, Paul Nelson	3:09
2.	"Undo the Right"	Willie Nelson, Hank Cochran	2:55
3.	"The Room"	Chris Waters, Tom Shapiro	3:40
4.	"It's Over My Head"	Bill Anderson, Wade Hayes, Chick Rains	2:48
5.	"I Still Do"	Marty Stuart, Rains	3:50
6.	"My Side of Town"	Cook, Rains	2:45
7.	"Where Do I Go to Start All Over"	Rains, Hayes	3:07
8.	"Our Time Is Coming"	Kix Brooks, Ronnie Dunn	4:30
9.	"Hurts Don't It"	Sam Hogin, Jim McBride, Greg Holland	3:20
10.	"This Is the Life for Me"	Hayes, Rains, Gary Nicholson	3:46

== Personnel ==
As listed in liner notes.

- Bruce C. Bouton – pedal steel guitar, slide guitar
- Dennis Burnside – piano, Hammond organ
- Mark Casstevens – acoustic guitar
- Rob Hajacos – fiddle, "assorted hoedown tools"
- Wade Hayes – lead vocals, acoustic guitar, electric guitar
- Dave Hoffner – piano
- David Hungate – bass guitar
- Brent Mason – electric guitar, baritone guitar
- John Wesley Ryles – background vocals
- Glenn Worf – bass guitar
- Dennis Wilson – background vocals
- Lonnie Wilson – drums, percussion

== Charts ==
=== Weekly charts ===
Chart (1996)	Peak position
US Billboard 200	91
US Top Country Albums (Billboard)	11

=== Year-end charts ===
Chart (1996)	Position
US Top Country Albums (Billboard)	73

== Certifications ==
Region	Certification	Certified units/sales
Canada (Music Canada)	Gold	50,000^{^}
United States (RIAA)	Gold	500,000^{^}
^{^} Shipments figures based on certification alone.
