= What I Meant to Say =

Single by Wade Hayes

from the album Old Enough to Know Better
- B-side: "Kentucky Bluebird"
- Released: October 31, 1995
- Recorded: 1994
- Genre: Country
- Length: 3:19
- Label: Columbia Nashville 78087
- Songwriters: Don Cook, Sam Hogin, Jim McBride
- Producer: Don Cook

Wade Hayes singles chronology
"Don't Stop" (1995)	"What I Meant to Say" (1995)	"On a Good Night" (1996)

"What I Meant to Say" is a song written by Sam Hogin, Jim McBride and Don Cook, and recorded by American country music artist Wade Hayes. It was released in October 1995 as the fourth and final single from Hayes' debut album Old Enough to Know Better. The song reached #5 on the Billboard Hot Country Songs chart and #15 on the Canadian RPM country singles chart. It even charted on the Billboard Hot 200, peaking at #116.

== Content ==
The narrator realizes that he hurt his lover when he said he could walk out on her and regrets it deeply. In the chorus he tells her that he really meant to apologize and to tell her that he loves her.

== Critical reception ==
Larry Flick, of Billboard magazine reviewed the song favorably, calling it a "slow and pretty ballad." He goes on to say the song proves that "as good as Hayes sounds on uptempo, this ballad is further proof that he can slow it way down and still deliver the goods with warmth and style."

== Music video ==
The music video was directed by Steven Goldmann and shot completely in sepia tone. The video begins with Wade sitting alone in a bar. As he gets up and goes outside everything and everybody starts going backwards as he walks back to his house. When he gets there, his lover is waiting there, crying after their fight. When he hugs her, time goes back to normal and they go inside.

== Chart performance ==
"What I Meant to Say" debuted at number sixty-nine on the U.S. Billboard Hot Country Singles & Tracks for the week of October 28, 1995.

Chart (1995–1996)	Peak position
Canada Country Singles (RPM)	15
US Bubbling Under Hot 100 (Billboard)	16
US Hot Country Songs (Billboard)	5
