= On a Good Night (song) =

Single by Wade Hayes

from the album On a Good Night
- B-side: "Steady as She Goes"
- Released: May 7, 1996
- Recorded: 1996
- Genre: Country
- Length: 3:09
- Label: Columbia Nashville 78312
- Songwriters: Larry Boone, Don Cook, Paul Nelson
- Producer: Don Cook

Wade Hayes singles chronology
"What I Meant to Say" (1996)	"On a Good Night" (1996)	"Where Do I Go to Start All Over" (1996)

"On a Good Night" is a song written by Larry Boone, Don Cook and Paul Nelson, and recorded by American country music artist Wade Hayes. It was released in May 1996 as the lead-off single and title from Hayes' album On a Good Night. The song reached number 2 on the Billboard Hot Country Songs chart and number 4 on the Canadian RPM country singles chart. It is his second highest-peaking single.

== Content ==
The song is an uptempo ode to what really makes a good night. The narrator discusses many different things that occur during a good night, including meeting a woman.

== Critical reception ==
Deborah Evans Price, of Billboard magazine reviewed the song favorably, saying that Hayes sounds more self-assured and confident than on previous singles. She goes on to say that the combination of Cook's and Hayes' vocals make for an extremely appealing single.

== Music video ==
The music video, like most of Wade Hayes' videos, was directed by Steven Goldmann. It takes place at a party in a barn. Wade is inside playing on stage. The video focuses on a clumsy woman that he notices in the audience who keeps falling down and even interrupts the song when she trips and disconnects the power cord.

== Chart performance ==
"On a Good Night" debuted at number sixty-one on the U.S. Billboard Hot Country Singles & Tracks for the week of May 11, 1996.

Chart (1996)	Peak position
Canada Country Singles (RPM)	2
US Hot Country Songs (Billboard)	2

=== Year-end charts ===
Chart (1996)	Position
Canada Country Tracks (RPM)	22
US Country Songs (Billboard)	20
