= Don't Stop (Wade Hayes song) =

Single by Wade Hayes

from the album Old Enough to Know Better
- B-side: "Someone Had to Teach You"
- Released: July 4, 1995
- Genre: Country
- Length: 2:44
- Label: Columbia Nashville 77954
- Songwriters: Chick Rains, Tom Shapiro
- Producer: Don Cook

Wade Hayes singles chronology
"I'm Still Dancin' with You" (1995)	"Don't Stop" (1995)	"What I Meant to Say" (1996)

"Don't Stop" is a song written by Chick Rains and Tom Shapiro, and recorded by American country music artist Wade Hayes. It was released in July 1995 as the third single from Hayes' debut album Old Enough to Know Better. The song reached number 10 on the Billboard Hot Country Songs chart and number 12 on the Canadian RPM country singles chart.

== Critical reception ==
Larry Flick, of Billboard magazine reviewed the song favorably, calling it a "fun, uptempo romp."

== Music video ==
The music video was directed by Steven Goldmann and premiered in mid-1995.

== Chart performance ==
"Don't Stop" debuted at number fifty-four on the U.S. Billboard Hot Country Singles & Tracks for the week of July 15, 1995.

Chart (1995)	Peak position
Canada Country Singles (RPM)	12
US Hot Country Songs (Billboard)	10

=== Year-end charts ===
Chart (1995)	Position
US Country Songs (Billboard)	72
