= I'm Still Dancin' with You =

Single by Wade Hayes

from the album Old Enough to Know Better
- B-side: "It's Gonna Take a Miracle"
- Released: March 6, 1995
- Recorded: 1994
- Genre: Honky-tonk
- Length: 3:19
- Label: Columbia Nashville
- Songwriters: Wade Hayes; Chick Rains
- Producer: Don Cook

Wade Hayes singles chronology
"Old Enough to Know Better" (1994)	"I'm Still Dancin' with You" (1995)	"Don't Stop" (1995)

"I'm Still Dancin' with You" is a song co-written and recorded by American country music artist Wade Hayes. It was released in March 1995 as the second single from his debut album, Old Enough to Know Better. The song reached number 4 on the Billboard Hot Country Singles & Tracks chart in June 1995. It was written by Hayes and Chick Rains.

== Content ==
The narrator states that even though he is no longer with his former lover, whenever he dances with another person he still thinks of the former lover.

== Music video ==
The music video was directed by Steven Goldmann and premiered in early 1995. It was filmed in Austin, Texas.

== Chart performance ==
"I'm Still Dancin' with You" debuted at number sixty-two on the U.S. Billboard Hot Country Singles & Tracks for the week of March 18, 1995.

Chart (1995)	Peak position
Canada Country Singles (RPM)	6
US Bubbling Under Hot 100 (Billboard)	13
US Hot Country Songs (Billboard)	4

=== Year-end charts ===
Chart (1995)	Position
Canada Country Tracks (RPM)	58
US Country Songs (Billboard)	63
