= McHayes =

American country music duo

- Origin: Nashville, Tennessee, United States
- Genres: Country
- Years active: 2003
- Labels: Universal South =
- Past members: Wade Hayes; Mark McClurg

McHayes was an American country music duo established in 2003 by Wade Hayes (guitar, vocals) and Mark McClurg (fiddle, vocals). Prior to the duo's foundation, Hayes was a solo artist, and McClurg was a member of Alan Jackson's road band, The Strayhorns. Active only in the year 2003, McHayes recorded an unreleased studio album on the Universal South Records label, in addition to charting one single on the Billboard Hot Country Singles & Tracks (now Hot Country Songs) charts. After disbanding, McClurg rejoined Jackson's band, and Hayes joined former Alabama lead singer Randy Owen's backing band.

== History ==
Between 1995 and 2002, McHayes frontman Wade Hayes was a solo artist, recording four studio albums, and charting more than a dozen singles on the Billboard country music charts, including the number 1 single "Old Enough to Know Better". After poor performance of his fourth studio album, Highways & Heartaches, he partnered with musician Mark McClurg, who had previously played fiddle in Alan Jackson's road band The Strayhorns, to form the duo McHayes. Signed to Universal South Records in 2003, McHayes charted one single, titled "It Doesn't Mean I Don't Love You", which peaked at number 41 on the U.S. country charts. McHayes also recorded an album titled Lessons in Lonely, which was slated for release in mid-2003 under the production of Brent Rowan. The album was never released, and the duo exited Universal South's roster.

== Discography ==
=== Singles ===
Year	Single	Peak positions	Album
Year	Single	US Country	Album
2003	"It Doesn't Mean I Don't Love You"	41	Lessons in Lonely (unreleased)
2004	"Tulsa Time"	—	Lessons in Lonely (unreleased)
"—" denotes releases that did not chart

=== Music videos ===
Year	Video
2004	"Tulsa Time"
