= Steven Goldmann =

Canadian director (1961–2015)

- Born: Steven Harvey Goldmann; August 18, 1961; Montreal, Quebec, Canada
- Died: April 30, 2015 (aged 53) Woodland Hills, California, U.S.
- Occupations: Music video director Filmmaker
- Years active: 1989–2013
- Formerly of: Shania Twain; Emerson Drive; John Anderson; Trace Adkins; Dwight Yoakam; Brooks & Dunn

Steven Harvey Goldmann (August 18, 1961 – April 30, 2015) was a Canadian music video and film director. He directed over 200 music videos, several television programs, and the movies Broken Bridges and Trailer Park of Terror. Goldmann died of cancer on April 30, 2015.

== Career ==
=== 1990-1999 ===
Goldmann came to international prominence and was recognized as a director to watch in 1998-1999, winning the triple crown of the country music video industry. His innovative direction of Faith Hill's "This Kiss" took top prize with the Country Music Association, Academy of Country Music, and TNN Music City News Best Video of the Year. In addition, he was awarded Video of the Year by Country Music Television (CMT) and Nashville Music Awards for "This Kiss". Goldmann also received the 1998 MusicRow Awards Best Video of the Year and a Telly Award (Kathy Mattea's "I'm On Your Side"), the 1998 MVPA (Music Video Production Association) Award for Country Video Of The Year (Mary Chapin Carpenter's "Better To Dream Of You"), and got to work with one of his heroes, Bruce Springsteen. It was by all measurements a year to remember and a year that brought Goldmann to national prominence. It capped off a run of recognition in the music video world that started with consecutive CMT Director of the Year Awards in 1996 and 1997, and ended with Rolling Stone magazine sighting Goldmann's Shania Twain video for "You Win My Love", one of six he directed for her, as the 5th most important/influential video of the 90s.

=== 2000-2013 ===
He directed the 2003 release of the fantasy musical Our Country, an IMAX film for Gaylord Entertainment. Goldmann both wrote and directed the large format film which includes Lyle Lovett, The Dixie Chicks, Dwight Yoakam, Alan Jackson, Martina McBride, andDolly Parton.

In 2004 Goldmann directed several episodes of Missing for Lifetime and Lions Gate Entertainment.

Goldmann also directed the feature film Broken Bridges, starring Toby Keith, Kelly Preston, Tess Harper, and Burt Reynolds for Paramount/CMT FILMS. In late 2007, Goldmann completed the horror film Trailer Park of Terror with producer Jonathan Bogner.

== Notable awards ==
- 1993 (CMT) COUNTRY MUSIC TELEVISION Director of the Year
- 1996 Collin Raye's "I Think About You" - ACADEMY OF COUNTRY MUSIC Video of the Year
- 1996 (CMT) COUNTRY MUSIC TELEVISION Director of the Year
- 1996 Shania Twain's "(If You're Not in It for Love) I'm Outta Here!" - Canadian Country Music Awards' CMT Video of the Year, 1996 SILVER CLIO AWARD
- 1997 Kathy Mattea's "455 Rocket" - COUNTRY MUSIC ASSOCIATION Video of the Year, 1997 NASHVILLE MUSIC AWARD Video of the Year
- 1997 (CMT) COUNTRY MUSIC TELEVISION Director of the Year
- 1998-1999 Faith Hill's "This Kiss" video - TNN Music City News Best Video Of The Year, Nashville Music Awards, and CMT's Video Of The Year
- 1998 Kathy Mattea's "I'm On Your Side" video - MusicRow Awards Best Video Of The Year, Telly Award
- 1998 Mary Chapin Carpenter's "The Better To Dream Of You" video - MVPA Award
- 2000 50 Odd Dollars - ALABAMA/UNA FILM FESTIVAL - Gold Lion for Best in Show & Best Short, HOUSTON FILM FESTIVAL Best Short Subject
- 2003 Alan Jackson's "Drive (For Daddy Gene)" video - ACM's Video of the Year award
- 2007 Emerson Drive's "Moments" - Canadian Country Music Awards' CMT Video of the Year

== Videography ==
=== Films directed ===
- Trailer Park of Terror (2007) – Summit Entertainment
- Broken Bridges (2006) – CMT/Paramount
- Our Country (2003) – Gaylord Entertainment

=== Television programs directed ===
- Missing – 4 episodes – Lifetime/Lions Gate
- Bruce Springsteen - A Secret History – BBC 2 Documentary
- BreakOUT! – Pilot – Concert/Reality show – MTV-2
- 2001 Canadian Country Music Awards - CBC
- Stampede – Variety - CBC

=== Music videos directed ===
193 music videos are currently listed here.

Year	Video	Artist
1989	"Time Will Tell"	Fifth Angel
1990	"Don't You Know"	The Joneses
1991	"I'll Start with You"	Paulette Carlson
1991	"Billy Can't Read"	Paul Overstreet
1992	"The Rock"	Lee Roy Parnell
1992	"Take It Like a Man"	Michelle Wright
1992	"I Can See Arkansas"	Anne Murray
1992	"That's Good"	Tim Mensy
1992	"Shake the Sugar Tree"	Pam Tillis
1992	"Bad Day for Trains"	Patricia Conroy
1992	"He Would Be Sixteen"	Michelle Wright
1992	"Cheap Whiskey"	Martina McBride
1993	"Let That Pony Run"	Pam Tillis
1993	"When My Ship Comes In"	Clint Black
1993	"What Made You Say That"	Shania Twain
1993	"Under the Light of the Texaco"	Lisa Stewart
1993	"Fallin' Never Felt So Good"	Shawn Camp
1993	"My Baby Loves Me (Just the Way That I Am)"	Martina McBride
1993	"Broken"	Andy Childs
1993	"You Lay a Whole Lot of Love on Me"	Shania Twain
1993	"I'm Playing for You"	Ronnie Milsap
1993	"There's a New Kid in Town"	Kathy Mattea
1994	"Confessin' My Love"	Shawn Camp
1994	"Life #9"	Martina McBride
1994	"Long Legged Hannah (From Butte, Montana)"	Jesse Hunter
1994	"Walking Away a Winner"	Kathy Mattea
1994	"That's My Baby"	Lari White
1994	"Spilled Perfume"	Pam Tillis
1994	"Big Heart"	Rodney Crowell
1994	"You Wouldn't Say That to a Stranger"	Suzy Bogguss
1994	"Runaway Train"	Dawn Sears
1994	"Radio Active"	Bryan Austin
1994	"Nobody's Gonna Rain on Our Parade"	Kathy Mattea
1994	"One Good Man"	Michelle Wright
1994	"She Dreams"	Mark Chesnutt
1994	"When You Walk in the Room"	Pam Tillis
1994	"Coming Back to Haunt Me"	Dale Daniel
1994	"Now I Know"	Lari White
1994	"Somebody's Leavin'"	Patricia Conroy
1994	"Somewhere in the Vicinity of the Heart"	Shenandoah with Alison Krauss
1995	"What Else Can I Do"	Patricia Conroy
1995	"That's How You Know (When You're in Love)"	Lari White
1995	"I Should Have Been True"	The Mavericks
1995	"What Mattered Most"	Ty Herndon
1995	"Where I Used to Have a Heart"	Martina McBride
1995	"The Likes of Me"	Marty Stuart
1995	"I'm Still Dancin' with You"	Wade Hayes
1995	"Drown"	Son Volt
1995	"Clown in Your Rodeo"	Kathy Mattea
1995	"This Is Me Missing You"	James House
1995	"Darned If I Don't (Danged If I Do)"	Shenandoah
1995	"I Didn't Know My Own Strength"	Lorrie Morgan
1995	"Slow Me Down"	Shelby Lynne
1995	"I Want My Goodbye Back"	Ty Herndon
1995	"Don't Stop"	Wade Hayes
1995	"It's Not the End of the World"	Emilio Navaira
1995	"Safe in the Arms of Love"	Martina McBride
1995	"When a Woman Loves a Man"	Lee Roy Parnell
1995	"Anything for Love"	James House
1995	"Listenin' to the Radio"	Chely Wright
1995	"Heart Half Empty"	Ty Herndon with Stephanie Bentley
1995	"Deep Down"	Pam Tillis
1995	"What I Meant to Say"	Wade Hayes
1995	"(If You're Not in It for Love) I'm Outta Here!"	Shania Twain
1995	"Not That Different"	Collin Raye
1995	"Standing Tall"	Lorrie Morgan
1995	"White Christmas"	Lari White
1996	"Some Things Are Meant to Be"	Linda Davis
1996	"The River and the Highway"	Pam Tillis
1996	"Who's That Girl"	Stephanie Bentley
1996	"You Win My Love"	Shania Twain
1996	"I Think About You"	Collin Raye
1996	"Thinkin' Strait"	Rich McCready
1996	"On a Good Night"	Wade Hayes
1996	"No One Needs to Know"	Shania Twain
1996	"Living in a Moment"	Ty Herndon
1996	"Nobody's Girl"	Michelle Wright
1996	"You Can't Lose Me"	Faith Hill
1996	"Home Ain't where His Heart Is (Anymore)"	Shania Twain
1996	"Where Do I Go to Start All Over"	Wade Hayes
1996	"Let Me into Your Heart"	Mary Chapin Carpenter
1996	"You've Got a Friend in Me"	Lyle Lovett
1996	"She Wants to Be Wanted Again"	Ty Herndon
1996	"Remember When"	Ray Vega
1996	"I Meant to Do That"	Paul Brandt
1996	"Born in the U.S.A." (acoustic)	Bruce Springsteen
1997	"455 Rocket"	Kathy Mattea
1997	"Places I've Never Been"	Mark Wills
1997	"Keeping Your Kisses"	Kris Tyler
1997	"The Better to Dream of You"	Mary Chapin Carpenter
1997	"All the Good Ones Are Gone"	Pam Tillis
1997	"I'm on Your Side"	Kathy Mattea
1997	"Flowers"	Billy Yates
1997	"Better Days"	Bekka & Billy
1997	"You Walked In"	Lonestar
1997	"Wichita Lineman"	Wade Hayes
1997	"From Here to Eternity"	Michael Peterson
1997	"Blink of an Eye"	Ricochet
1997	"I Have to Surrender"	Ty Herndon
1997	"One Solitary Tear"	Sherrié Austin
1997	"What a Woman Knows"	Kris Tyler
1997	"The Next Step"	Jim Collins
1997	"Just Another Heartache"	Chely Wright
1997	"He's Got You"	Brooks & Dunn
1997	"The Day That She Left Tulsa (In a Chevy)"	Wade Hayes
1998	"Back in the Saddle"	Matraca Berg
1998	"Too Good to Be True"	Michael Peterson
1998	"Woman to Woman"	The Lynns
1998	"Now That I Found You"	Terri Clark
1998	"This Kiss"	Faith Hill
1998	"A Man Holdin' On (To a Woman Lettin' Go)"	Ty Herndon
1998	"105"	Fred Eaglesmith
1998	"I Can Still Feel You"	Collin Raye
1998	"Why'd You Start Lookin' So Good"	Monty Holmes
1998	"How Long Gone"	Brooks & Dunn
1998	"I'll Go On Loving You"	Alan Jackson
1998	"Five O'Clock Hero"	Matt King
1998	"You're Easy on the Eyes"	Terri Clark
1998	"Wherever You Are"	Mary Chapin Carpenter
1998	"When I Grow Up"	Clint Daniels
1998	"I Won't Lie"	Shannon Brown
1998	"Tore Up from the Floor Up"	Wade Hayes
1999	"With You"	Lila McCann
1999	"Did I Shave My Back for This?" (with Cledus T. Judd)	Cledus T. Judd
1999	"It's About Time"	Julie Reeves
1999	"Maybe Not Tonight"	Sammy Kershaw with Lorrie Morgan
1999	"Slave to the Habit"	Shane Minor
1999	"If I Had a Nickel (One Thin Dime)"	Redmon & Vale
1999	"The Secret of Life"	Faith Hill
1999	"Little Man"	Alan Jackson
1999	"Rodeo Boy"	Fred Eaglesmith
1999	"Crush"	Lila McCann
1999	"Ordinary Love"	Shane Minor
1999	"I Wear Your Love"	Lisa Angelle
1999	"Let There Be Love"	Anne Murray with Dawn Langstroth
1999	"Steam"	Ty Herndon
1999	"Pop a Top"	Alan Jackson
1999	"Christ-mas"	Cledus T. Judd
1999	"Here Comes My Baby"	The Mavericks
2000	"A Mother and Father's Prayer"	Collin Raye with Melissa Manchester
2000	"More"	Trace Adkins
2000	"Couldn't Last a Moment"	Collin Raye
2000	"The Trouble with Angels"	Kathy Mattea
2001	"When God-Fearin' Women Get the Blues"	Martina McBride
2001	"Helplessly, Hopelessly"	Jessica Andrews
2001	"It's Alright to Be a Redneck"	Alan Jackson
2001	"I'm Tryin'"	Trace Adkins
2001	"Karma"	Jessica Andrews
2002	"Drive (For Daddy Gene)"	Alan Jackson
2002	"Consider This"	Aaron Pritchett
2002	"Here I Am I'm Sorry"	Jason Popham
2002	"The Last Man Committed"	Eric Heatherly
2002	"Look at Me Now"	Sixwire
2002	"If I Left You"	Kelly Willis
2002	"Modern Man"	Michael Peterson
2002	"These Are Those Days"	Holly Lamar
2002	"Waitin' on Joe"	Steve Azar
2002	"That'd Be Alright"	Alan Jackson
2003	"Whatever It Takes"	Kellie Coffey
2003	"Only God (Could Stop Me Loving You)"	Emerson Drive
2003	"Red Dirt Road"	Brooks & Dunn
2003	"Honesty (Write Me a List)"	Rodney Atkins
2003	"Long Black Train"	Josh Turner
2003	"Would You Believe"	The Mavericks
2003	"The First Day You Wake Up Alone"	Beverley Mahood
2004	"Break Down Here"	Julie Roberts
2004	"Simple Life"	Carolyn Dawn Johnson
2004	"The Late Great Golden State"	Dwight Yoakam
2004	"This Love"	LeAnn Rimes
2004	"Blame It on Mama"	The Jenkins
2004	"North Dakota Boy"	Doc Walker
2004	"What It Ain't"	Josh Turner
2004	"Come Home Soon"	SHeDAISY
2005	"Wake Up Older"	Julie Roberts
2005	"Down This Road"	The Wrights
2005	"In State"	Kathleen Edwards
2006	"A Good Man"	Emerson Drive
2006	"Broken"	Lindsey Haun
2006	"Countrified Soul"	Emerson Drive
2006	"Moments"	Emerson Drive
2006	"Bagpipes Cryin'"	Rushlow Harris
2007	"Love Sweet Love"	Johnny Reid
2008	"Belongs to You"	Emerson Drive
2008	"15 Minutes of Shame"	Kristy Lee Cook
2010	"Journey On" (with Flick Wiltshire)	Ty Herndon
2010	"This Song's for You" (with Darren Doane)	Joey + Rory with Zac Brown Band
2011	"Wait"	Amber Hayes
2011	"Long Way to Go"	Alan Jackson
2011	"Hard Time Movin' On"	David Bradley
2011	"Headache" (with Bryan Allen)	Joey + Rory
2012	"So You Don't Have to Love Me Anymore"	Alan Jackson
2013	"With You" (with David Pichette)	Emerson Drive
2013	"Put It Into Drive"	Doc Walker
2013	"Lies I Told Myself"	Ty Herndon
