= Old Enough to Know Better =

Studio album by Wade Hayes
- Released: January 3, 1995
- Recorded: 1994
- Studio: Soundshop A & B, Nashville, TN
- Genre: Honky-tonk
- Length: 33:36
- Label: Columbia Nashville
- Producer: Don Cook

Wade Hayes chronology
Old Enough to Know Better (1995)	On a Good Night (1996)

Singles from Old Enough to Know Better
- 1. "Old Enough to Know Better" Released: November 14, 1994; 2. "I'm Still Dancin' with You" Released: March 6, 1995; 3. "Don't Stop" Released: July 4, 1995; 4. "What I Meant to Say" Released: October 31, 1995

Professional ratings
Review scores
Source	Rating
Allmusic	4/5 stars
Entertainment Weekly	B

Old Enough to Know Better is the debut studio album by American country music artist Wade Hayes. Released in early 1995 on Columbia Records, it produced a Number One hit on the Billboard Hot Country Singles & Tracks (now Hot Country Songs) charts in its title track. The singles "I'm Still Dancin' with You," "Don't Stop," and "What I Meant to Say" were also Top Ten hits on the same chart. The album itself was certified gold by the RIAA for US shipments of 500,000 copies. The track "Steady as She Goes" was co-written by both members of Brooks & Dunn.

== Musical style and composition ==
Old Enough to Know Better has been described as a honky-tonk album, with its style style compared to the works of traditional country performers such as Merle Haggard, Waylon Jennings, Willie Nelson, and George Jones.

== Track listing ==
No.	Title	Writer(s)	Length
1.	"Don't Make Me Come to Tulsa"	Don Cook	3:32
2.	"I'm Still Dancin' with You"	Wade Hayes, Chick Rains	3:19
3.	"Old Enough to Know Better"	Hayes, Rains	3:39
4.	"Kentucky Bluebird"	Cook, Wally Wilson	3:25
5.	"Don't Stop"	Rains, Tom Shapiro	2:44
6.	"What I Meant to Say"	Cook, Sam Hogin, Jim McBride	3:19
7.	"Steady as She Goes"	Kix Brooks, Ronnie Dunn, Cook	3:22
8.	"Family Reunion"	Rains, Harlan Howard	4:07
9.	"Someone Had to Teach You"	Howard, Bill Hervey	2:48
10.	"It's Gonna Take a Miracle"	Hayes, Rains	3:21

== Personnel ==
As listed in liner notes.

- Bruce Bouton – slide guitar, pedal steel guitar
- Mark Casstevens – acoustic guitar
- Rob Hajacos – fiddle, "electric hoedown tools"
- Wade Hayes – lead vocals, background vocals
- Mitch Humphries – piano (5)
- John Barlow Jarvis – piano (1–4, 6–10), Hammond organ (5)
- Patty Loveless – background vocals (4)
- Brent Mason – electric guitar, six-string bass guitar
- Michael Rhodes – bass guitar
- John Wesley Ryles – background vocals (1–3, 5–10)
- Dennis Wilson – background vocals (1–3, 5–10)
- Lonnie Wilson – drums, percussion

== Charts ==
=== Weekly charts ===
Chart (1995)	Peak position
US Billboard 200	99
US Top Country Albums (Billboard)	19
US Heatseekers Albums (Billboard)	1

=== Year-end charts ===
Chart (1995)	Position
US Top Country Albums (Billboard)	33
Chart (1996)	Position
US Top Country Albums (Billboard)	64

== Certifications ==
Region	Certification	Certified units/sales
Canada (Music Canada)	Gold	50,000^{^}
United States (RIAA)	Gold	500,000^{^}
^{^} Shipments figures based on certification alone.

== Sources ==
- Liner notes to Old Enough to Know Better. Columbia Records, 1995.
