= Old Enough to Know Better (song) =

Single by Wade Hayes

from the album Old Enough to Know Better
- B-side: "Family Reunion"
- Released: November 14, 1994
- Genre: Honky-tonk
- Length: 3:39
- Label: Columbia Nashville 77739
- Songwriters: Wade Hayes; Chick Rains
- Producer: Don Cook

Wade Hayes singles chronology
"Old Enough to Know Better" (1994)	"I'm Still Dancin' with You" (1995)

"Old Enough to Know Better" is a song co-written and recorded by American country music singer Wade Hayes. It was released in November 1994 as the first single and title track from his debut album Old Enough to Know Better, as well as his debut single. The song is also his only Number One hit, having reached its peak on the Billboard country charts in February of that year. It was written by Hayes and Chick Rains.

== Content ==
"Old Enough to Know Better" is a moderate up-tempo that begins with a fiddle solo. The male narrator tells of how a lifestyle of nighttime partying leaves him short on money and criticized by his boss. The narrator then concludes that he is "old enough to know better, but still too young to care".

== Critical reception ==
Alanna Nash of Entertainment Weekly, in her review of the album, called the song "a born-to-win dance number", and Charlotte Dillon of Allmusic called it "an impressive honky-tonk [number]".

== Chart positions ==
"Old Enough to Know Better" debuted at number 64 on the U.S. Billboard Hot Country Singles & Tracks for the week of November 19, 1994.

Chart (1994–1995)	Peak position
Canada Country Singles (RPM)	1
US Hot Country Songs (Billboard)	1

=== Year-end charts ===
Chart (1995)	Position
Canada Country Tracks (RPM)	59
US Country Songs (Billboard)	54
