= The Day That She Left Tulsa (In a Chevy) =

Single by Wade Hayes

from the album When the Wrong One Loves You Right
- B-side: "Wichita Lineman"
- Released: November 18, 1997
- Recorded: 1997
- Genre: Country
- Length: 3:33
- Label: Columbia Nashville
- Songwriters: Mark D. Sanders, Steve Diamond
- Producer: Don Cook

Wade Hayes singles chronology
"Wichita Lineman" (1997)	"The Day That She Left Tulsa (In a Chevy)" (1997)	"When the Wrong One Loves You Right" (1998)

"The Day That She Left Tulsa (In a Chevy)" is a song written by Mark D. Sanders and Steve Diamond, and recorded by American country music artist Wade Hayes. It was released in November 1997 the lead-off single from Hayes' album When the Wrong One Loves You Right. The song reached number 5 on the Billboard Hot Country Songs chart and number 9 on the Canadian RPM country singles chart. It also peaked at number 86 on the Billboard Hot 100 chart. It was his last top ten single to date.

== Content ==
While riding the Ferris wheel at a carnival, the narrator's girlfriend reveals that she is pregnant. He takes it for granted at first but realizes that the baby isn't his when she becomes distraught and leaves town without notice. He says that if he had the chance, he would have loved her anyway.

== Music video ==
The music video, like most of Wade Hayes' videos, was directed by Steven Goldmann. It begins, just like in the song, with a couple on a Ferris wheel and the woman telling him she's pregnant. She then becomes distraught and drives away. Wade drives around and finds her walking on a bridge. After trying to reconcile with her she gets back in her truck and drives away from him.

== Critical reception ==
In reviewing the album, When the Wrong One Loves You Right, Thom Owens of Allmusic cited this track as "illustrating Hayes' true potential" and as one of the strongest cuts on the album "where the melody, lyric and delivery blend perfectly".

== Chart performance ==
"The Day That She Left Tulsa (In a Chevy)" debuted at number sixty-two on the U.S. Billboard Hot Country Singles & Tracks for the week of November 1, 1997.

Chart (1997–1998)	Peak position
Canada Country Singles (RPM)	9
US Billboard Hot 100	86
US Hot Country Songs (Billboard)	5

=== Year-end charts ===
Chart (1998)	Position
Canada Country Tracks (RPM)	78
US Country Songs (Billboard)	53
