= Highways & Heartaches (Wade Hayes album) =

Studio album by Wade Hayes
- Released: September 12, 2000
- Genre: Country
- Length: 33:05
- Label: Monument Nashville
- Producer: Don Cook; Ronnie Dunn; Terry McBride; Chick Rains

Wade Hayes chronology
When the Wrong One Loves You Right (1998)	Highways & Heartaches (2000)	Place to Turn Around (2009)

Singles from Highways & Heartaches
- 1. "Up North (Down South, Back East, Out West)" Released: March 7, 2000; 2. "Goodbye Is the Wrong Way to Go" Released: 2000; 3. "What's It Gonna Take" Released: 2000

Professional ratings
Review scores
Source	Rating
Allmusic	link

Highways & Heartaches is the fourth studio album by American country music artist Wade Hayes. His final studio album and his only album for Monument Records, it produced the minor singles "Up North (Down South, Back East, Out West)" and "Goodbye Is the Wrong Way to Go", which peaked at #48 and #45, respectively, on the Billboard Hot Country Singles & Tracks (now Hot Country Songs) charts.

After this album's release, Hayes and fiddler Mark McClurg, under the name McHayes, recorded an album entitled Lessons in Lonely. It was not released, but its lead-off single charted at #41 on the country charts.

== Track listing ==
1. "Up North (Down South, Back East, Out West)" (Jill Wood, Danny Wells) – 3:41
2. "Life After Lovin' You" (Billy Burnette, Brett Beavers) – 3:45
3. "Goodbye Is the Wrong Way to Go" (Shawn Camp, Will Smith) – 3:21
4. "What's It Gonna Take" (John Rich, John Barlow Jarvis) – 3:13
5. "She Used to Say that to Me" (Jim Lauderdale, John Scott Sherrill) – 2:44
6. "Up and Down" (Terry McBride, Marv Green) – 3:19
7. "You Just Keep On" (Camp, Herb McCullough, Taylor Dunn) – 3:49
8. "That's What Honky Tonks Are For" (Don Cook, Chick Rains) – 2:45
9. "You Were, You Are, You'll Always Be" (Lewis Anderson, George Teren) – 3:16
10. "I'm Lonesome Too" (Camp, Gary Scruggs) – 5:38

== Personnel ==
- Bruce Bouton - steel guitar, keyboards
- Mark Casstevens - acoustic guitar
- Chad Cromwell - drums, percussion
- Paul Franklin - electric guitar, steel guitar, slide guitar
- Sonny Garrish - steel guitar
- Rob Hajacos - fiddle, mandolin, "assorted hoedown tools"
- Wade Hayes - electric guitar, lead vocals, background vocals
- Aubrey Haynie - fiddle, mandolin, "assorted hoedown tools"
- John Hobbs - keyboards
- John Barlow Jarvis - organ, piano
- Chris Leuzinger - electric guitar
- Liana Manis - background vocals
- Brent Mason - electric guitar
- Michael Rhodes - bass guitar
- John Wesley Ryles - background vocals
- Brian Siewart - string arrangements
- Biff Watson - acoustic guitar
- Dennis Wilson - background vocals
- Lonnie Wilson - drums, percussion
- Glenn Worf - bass guitar
- Reese Wynans - organ, piano

== Chart performance ==
Chart (2000)	Peak position
U.S. Billboard Top Country Albums	55
