= Jerry Salley =

American singer-songwriter

- Origin: United States
- Genres: Bluegrass; Country
- Occupations: Singer-songwriter musician
- Instruments: Guitar vocals
- Years active: 1982–present
- Labels: Banner Music Publishing, Mountain Home
- Website: www.jerrysalley.com

Jerry Salley is an American country and bluegrass singer-songwriter. Salley won SESAC's 2003 "Country Music Songwriter of the Year" award.

Salley has been writing and singing in Nashville, Tennessee since 1982. To date, he has had 300 songs recorded in his career, including by Reba McEntire ("I'm Gonna Take That Mountain"), Wild Rose ("Breaking New Ground"), John Anderson ("I Fell in the Water"), Wade Hayes ("How Do You Sleep at Night"), and ten (10) top twenty gospel songs.

== Biography ==
Salley has had songs recorded by Toby Keith, Patty Loveless, Brad Paisley, Joe Nichols, Darryl Worley, The Whites, Loretta Lynn, and many others.

Salley is a six-time Dove Award nominee, and won a Dove award in 1990 for Inspirational Song of the Year. He won the award for co-writing "His Strength is Perfect", with Steven Curtis Chapman.

Numerous other nationally known country, gospel and bluegrass artists have also recorded Jerry's songs, including: IIIrd Tyme Out, The Seldom Scene, Mountain Heart, Lonesome River Band, Dale Ann Bradley, Jeff & Sheri Easter, The Isaacs, Bradley Walker, Newfound Road, Wildfire, Terri Gibbs, Kyle Petty, Barbara Fairchild, The Kingsmen, The Florida Boys, The Martins, Don Rigsby, Rock Country, David Peterson & 1946, Jake Hess, Lordsong, The Ruppes, Rebecca Lynn Howard, Melba Montgomery, Gary Stewart, Shenandoah, and Vern Jackson.

As an artist, Salley has performed on numerous stage shows, including the Grand Ole Opry. He has also appeared on Late Show with David Letterman, Regis and Kathie Lee, Today Show, and several shows on the former TNN network.

In addition to his Dove recognition from the Gospel Music Association, Jerry has received numerous awards from different associations for his songwriting accomplishments, from the IBMA, NSAI, SESAC, and Gospel Voice Magazine. Along with friends Carl Jackson and Larry Cordle, the trio (Cordle, Jackson & Salley) recorded the song "You’re Running Wild" on the Louvin Brothers Tribute on Universal South Records, which features numerous country music stars singing songs made famous by the legendary duo. Entitled Livin', Lovin', Losin': Songs of the Louvin Brothers, this project won the 2004 Grammy for Country Album of the Year. The trio tours across the country and performs the hits they wrote for others. Working on another project with Carl Jackson, Salley co-wrote "Indian Crow" for the critically acclaimed Mark Twain: Words & Music project.
