= Academy of Western Artists =

Cultural heritage organization

The Academy of Western Artists, originally based in Gene Autry, Oklahoma, is an organization that honors individuals who have preserved and perpetuated the heritage of the American cowboy, through music, poetry, campfire and chuckwagon cooking, and western and ranch clothing and gear.

The academy seeks to preserve and promote the traditional values associated with the cowboy image despite consolidation in the cattle industry and changes in contemporary society. The group hosts annual awards shows. Its director was the late western publisher Bobby Newton.

In 1996, the academy began making annual awards at a gathering in Fort Worth, Texas, specifically to recognize the performers and artisans active in the contemporary cowboy and western movement. The awards have been received by more than 500 individuals in a variety of categories. R.W. Hampton received the first Will Rogers Awards, named for the cowboy humorist Will Rogers. He was both "Male Vocalist of the Year" and "Entertainer of the Year" in 1996. A year later, Hampton's album, Ridin' The Dreamland Range, was honored as the association's Album of the Year. Hampton won "Male Vocalist of the Year" again in 1999, 2002, and 2006.

The 2011 winner, honored early in 2012 at the 16th annual awards presentation, include Bruce Pollock (radio disc jockey), Henry Real Bird and Bette Wolf Duncan (poetry books, Horse Tracks and Dakota, respectively), The Nugents (young artists), Syd Masters (male singer), and Mary Kaye (female singer), Jimmy Burson and Joni Harms (Western swing), Stardust Cowboys (Western album "Riding Back to You"), Curtis Potter (Country album, "The Potter's Touch"), and B. K. Nuzum (chuckwagon).

The Academy was reorganized in 2024 by Bob Saul of Fort Worth Texas. Saul sought out Deanna Dickinson McCall as the Manager, a noted Western authority and author. It is now based in Fort Worth, Texas. The awards now include media, film, events and promoters, making it the only group to cover almost all facets of Western Culture.

== See Also ==
- Western Music Association
