= Rich McCready =

American country music singer-songwriter (born 1970)

- Born: February 9, 1970 (age 55)
- Origin: Seneca, Missouri
- Genres: Country
- Occupation: Singer-songwriter
- Instrument: Guitar
- Years active: 1996–present
- Labels: Magnatone, American Originals, KP Records
- Website: Official website

Rich McCready (born February 9, 1970, in Seneca, Missouri) is an American country music singer-songwriter. McCready signed to Magnatone Records in 1995 and recorded two albums for the label. His highest-charting single, "Thinkin' Strait," peaked at number 53 in 1996.

== Discography ==
=== Albums ===
Title	Album details
Rich McCready	Release date: February 20, 1996; Label: Magnatone; Formats: CD, Cassette
That Just About Covers It	Release date: June 17, 1997; Label: Magnatone; Formats: CD, Cassette
2005	Release date: September 21, 2004; Label: American Originals; Formats: CD
Ride On	Release date: June 1, 2011; Label: KP Records; Formats: CD

=== Singles ===
Year	Single	Peak positions	Album
Year	Single	US Country	Album
1995	"Hangin' On"	58	Rich McCready
1996	"Thinkin' Strait"	53	Rich McCready
1996	"When Hell Freezes Over"	—	Rich McCready
1997	"That Just About Covers It"	74	That Just About Covers It
1997	"Let Me Take That Ol' Heartache"	—	That Just About Covers It
2005	"Wish I Was in Wichita"	—	2005
2006	"Intergalactic Cowboy"	—	2005
"—" denotes releases that did not chart

=== Music videos ===
Year	Video	Director
1995	"Hangin' On"	Richard Murray
1996	"Thinkin' Strait"	Steven Goldmann
1996	"When Hell Freezes Over"	David Blood
1997	"That Just About Covers It"	Richard Murray
