= R.W. Hampton =

American singer-songwriter (born 1957)

- Born: June 17, 1957 (age 69)
- Origin: Houston, Texas, U.S.
- Genres: Country; cowboy; folk
- Occupations: Singer; songwriter; musician; actor
- Instruments: Singer; acoustic guitar
- Years active: 1983–present
- Label: Cimarron Sounds
- Website: rwhampton.com

R. W. Hampton (born June 17, 1957 in Houston, Texas) is an American western music singer-songwriter. Hampton has achieved both critical and commercial success, winning multiple awards from the Western Music Association and the Academy of Western Artists and four separate Wrangler Awards from the National Cowboy & Western Heritage Museum in Oklahoma City.

In 2013, Hampton was named among the "Top 50 Best Singers of Country and Western Singers of All Time" by American Cowboy magazine (alongside performers like George Strait, Johnny Cash, George Jones, and Gene Autry) and has won acclaim and countless awards singing songs celebrating the Western way of life.

Called “Today's Voice of the American Cowboy,” Hampton began his career playing guitar and singing at cowboy campfires as a wrangler at Philmont Scout Ranch. Prior to his career in the entertainment industry, he drifted across the American West, working cowboy jobs on some of the biggest ranches in the West, punching cattle, riding young colts, shoeing horses and guiding trail rides and hunters in the high country.

A writer and performer, Hampton's wife Lisa doubles as his manager & agent.

== Early career ==
After eleven years working as a cowboy working on western ranches, Hampton began a career in music. In 1984, he released his first album, Travelin' Light, with appearances at The Grand Ole Opry in Nashville, Tennessee and the Smithsonian Institution in Washington, D.C. Kenny Rogers chose Hampton to play himself, a cowboy singing at the campfire, in the television movie, Wild Horses.

Hampton worked at ranch duties on the former Spade Ranch in Texas, the IL Ranch in northern Nevada, the ZX Ranch in Oregon, and the Pickerel Land and Cattle Company in Wyoming, but preferred the Texas Panhandle and eastern New Mexico, where he owns the Clearview Ranch, located about twenty miles southwest of Cimarron. and in 2022 purchased a cattle and big game hunting property, The Six Springs Ranch, Southeast of Raton, NM.

== 1990s ==
Throughout the 1990s, Hampton continued his recording and entertainment career, appearing in several Western films and recording five albums in six years from 1994 to 1999. In 1996, he received the Academy of Western Artists’ first Will Rogers Award for both Male Vocalist of the Year and Entertainer of the Year. A year later, his album, Ridin’ The Dreamland Range, won the association's Album of the Year. The Academy named Hampton its Male Vocalist of the Year again in 1999.

=== The Last Cowboy (1993) ===
The one-man stage play The Last Cowboy was written with Hampton's brother Jeff, and playwright Dave Marquis in 1993. The show received critical praise for Hampton's performance, and for his interpretation of the cowboy past. His album The Last Cowboy – His Journey, which was inspired by the play, won him his first Wrangler Award in 2000 for Excellence in Dramatic Presentation and Original Music Composition from the National Cowboy Museum and Western Heritage Center.

== 2000s ==
=== "For The Freedom" (2006) ===
Hampton won a Western Music Association award for Top Male Performer in 2004. In 2006, he won the WMA Song of the Year award for his composition "For the Freedom" (which appears on his album I Believe). American Cowboy magazine said of the record, "For The Freedom" "touches the heart in a personal way. Regardless of how one feels about war, it beautifully honors the soldiers’ work and commitment."

=== Oklahoma… (2007) ===
In 2008, Hampton won his second Western Heritage Award, this time for his album Oklahoma … Where the West Remains! which was named Outstanding Traditional Western Album. This album was Hampton's first performance with a full orchestra. It was praised by Western Horseman magazine for what it described as Hampton's "deep, velvety vocals, idyllic lyrics and cowboy authenticity" which has "captivated audiences worldwide."

=== "Austin to Boston" (2010) ===
Prior to the album's release, the first European focus track, "Cowboy's Prayer", debuted at No. 2 on the UK Hotdisc Top 40 chart and rose to No. 1, where it remained for three weeks; the second European focus track, "Driftin' Again", debuted at No. 1. Early in 2011, Hampton received his third Wrangler Award from the National Cowboy Museum and Western Heritage Center in the "Outstanding Original Western Composition" category for his song, "Shortgrass", from this album.

=== Lubbock Cowboy Symposium (2013) ===
Having recorded twelve albums, Hampton was a headline performer at the 2013 National Cowboy Symposium in Lubbock, Texas, sponsored in part by the American Cowboy Culture Association. Hampton first played before an audience in Lubbock in 1978; his selection at that time was "Little Joe the Wrangler".

In an interview with Ray Westbrook of the Lubbock Avalanche-Journal, Hampton said:

The spiritual songs seem to go right along with the cowboy life. There's varying degrees of people's faith out where we live, but it seems to go right along, because you work out in this creation — God's creation. ... Every time I see a beautiful sunset or a sunrise — and I've seen a bunch of them — I always think of the song, "How Great Thou Art". I like to call it the world's greatest cowboy song because it talks about God's creation. ... When the sun comes up over the horizon, [it] just lights everything up, and you go "wow!"...

I have a song, kind of a signature song, called "Born to be a Cowboy". It says, "The life I love I freely chose; I'm at it yet tonight. I was born to be a cowboy, and I will be 'til I die."

In late 2013 American Cowboy Magazine released their Legends Collector's Edition where they listed Hampton among the "Top 50 Greatest Country & Western Singers of All Time" along with Johnny Cash, Roy Rogers, George Strait, Hank Williams, Ian Tyson, and Chris LeDoux. In April 2014 Hampton's song "Born to be a Cowboy", originally recorded in 1994 was chosen by cowboy music radio host and writer Charley Engel as one of the Top 20 Cowboy Songs written in the previous 20 years, saying "One mark of success is how many times your song has been covered. There are no less than nine versions by other top artists." Other musicians on the list included Riders in the Sky, Michael Martin Murphey, Tom Russell and Don Edwards.

=== "This Cowboy" (2014) ===
Hampton's latest release is the first album in a two-part project, "This Cowboy, My Country" which includes songs written or co-written by Hampton, as well as several cover versions. Two tracks on the album were pre-released in 2013 and 2014 to positive reviews and sold as singles to benefit a New Mexico Veterans group, (Horses for Heroes, New Mexico), that Hampton and his family have become involved with. "My Country's Not For Sale" stayed at the top of the Western Music radio charts for the entire 12 months of 2014 and the album "This Cowboy" was listed at No. 40 for Top True Country Albums for 2014 on the Roots Music Report. The album was at the No. 2 position for the Roots Music Report True Country Chart as of February 9, 2015.

=== Awards and recognition ===
Hampton has won industry awards for his performing and songwriting fifteen times, notably in November 2011, when he was inducted into the Hall of Fame of the Western Music Association. His first industry awards came in 1996, when the Academy of Western Artists presented him with its first Will Rogers awards, naming him both Male Vocalist of the Year and Entertainer of the Year. Twelve months later, his album, Ridin’ The Dreamland Range, won recognition as the group's Album of the Year. The Academy named Hampton its Male Vocalist of the Year again in 1999, 2002 and 2006.

The Western Music Association inducted him into the Association's Hall of Fame in 2011, and have voted him Top Male Performer for 2004 and 2010, and his composition, "For the Freedom" (from his Western gospel album, I Believe) won the 2006 WMA Song of the Year. In September 2009, Hampton received a Lifetime Achievement Award from the American Association of Cowboy Culture.

Hampton was named the 2018 recipient of the Philmont Staff Association's Distinguished Staff Alumni Award. The Distinguished Staff Alumni Award (DSAA) is presented annually by the Philmont Staff Association (PSA) to recognize “distinguished or exceptional personal success or achievement on a national or international level by a current or former Philmont staff member, in any field of human endeavor, that brings honor and credit to the legacy of the Philmont staff.” Previous recipients include Wally Berg, internationally known mountaineer and explorer; the late Steve Fossett, world record aviator and adventurer, and Rick Searfoss, former NASA astronaut and space shuttle commander.

In 2021, Hampton was awarded the prestigious Chester A. Reynolds Award at the Western Heritage Awards in Oklahoma City, OK. The National Cowboy & Western Heritage Museum (formerly National Cowboy Hall of Fame and Western Heritage Center) established the Chester A. Reynolds Award, named in honor of the founder of the Museum, Chester A. Reynolds. The award is presented to a living honoree that has made outstanding contributions as an individual, group or institution toward perpetuating the ideals, history and heritage of the American West, whether by a single remarkable achievement or a body of quality work over a period of years.

== Key live performances ==
Hampton has performed on the Grand Ole Opry in Nashville, Tennessee, the American Folklife Festival at the Smithsonian Institution in Washington, D.C., British Country Music Awards in Surrey, England, The National Cowboy Poetry Gathering (for more than 20 years) at the Western Folklife Center in Elko, NV., Red Steagall's Cowboy Gathering in Fort Worth, TX, and has toured extensively across the United States as well as Australia, Canada and South America.

== Film and television work ==
As an actor, Hampton has appeared in "Kenny Rogers & The American Cowboy," (1979) "Wild Horses," (1985) "Independence," (1987) "The Gambler III," (1987) "Long Arm," (1988), "The Tracker," (1988) "Desperado II," (1988) "Lucky Luke," (1991) "Doc West," (2009) "Cactus Creek," (2010), "In the Bunkhouse with Red Steagall," (2011), "Sundown" (2013 - 2014), "Canyon Trail" (2015), "Red Steagall is West of Wall Street (2021) and "What Remains" (2022).

In 2022, Hampton appeared in two films – "Peace River" and "The Contested Plains." Hampton is currently working on films "Sod and Stubble" and "The Christmas Guest."

== Voice and print work ==
Hampton has also done extensive work in advertising for companies Levi Strauss, Resistol Hats, The Western Channel, The American Cowboy Gallery, the National Cowboy & Western Heritage Museum, Cal Farley's Boys Ranch, The Western Channel, Rockmount Western Clothing, Atwood's Ranch and Home Stores and more.

His print work includes Stetson Hats, Levi Strauss, Cowboy Artists of America, "Last of a Breed," "America," "Buckaroo (Bound Sound Book)" "After Barbed Wire: Cowboys of Our Time", the Oklahoma Tourism Council, "American Cowboy," American Paint Horse and more.

== Discography ==
=== Albums ===
- 2014 This Cowboy
- 2013 Hell in a Helmet
- 2013 My Country's Not For Sale
- 2010 Austin to Boston
- 2008 My Old Friends
- 2007 Oklahoma… Where the West Remains!
- 2005 I Believe
- 2005 Our First Noel
- 2003 Troubadour
- 2001 Always in My Heart
- 1999 The Last Cowboy
- 1998 Then Sings My Soul
- 1996 Ridin’ the Dreamland Range
- 1994 Born to Be a Cowboy
- 1992 The One That I Could Never Ride
- 1984 Travelin’ Light
