= Wade Hayes =

American country music singer (born 1969)

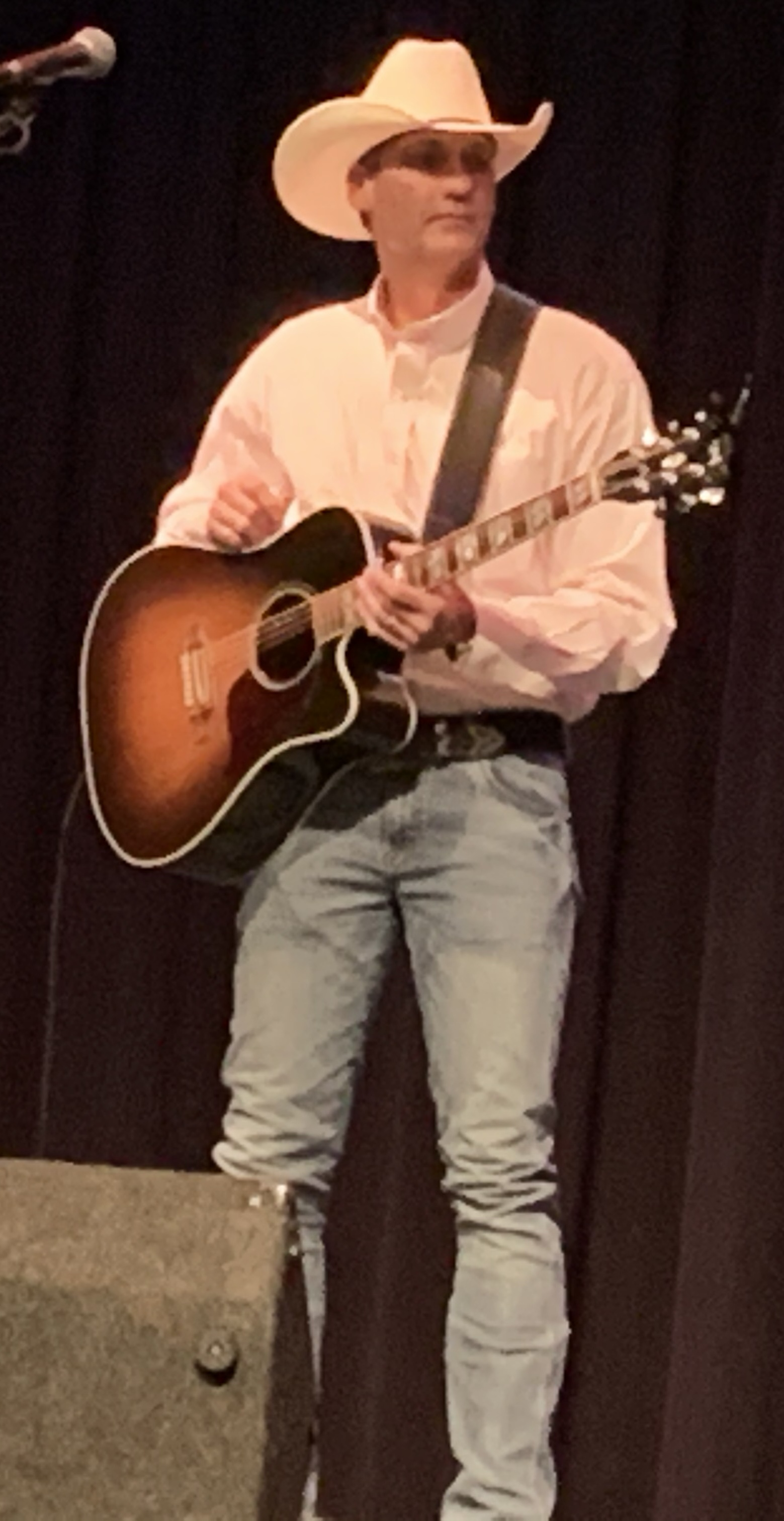
- Wade Hayes in 2022

Background information
- Born: Tony Wade Hayes; April 20, 1969 (age 57) Tulsa, Oklahoma, United States
- Origin: Bethel Acres, Oklahoma, United States
- Genre: Country
- Occupation: Singer
- Instruments: Vocals, guitar
- Years active: 1994–2004; 2008–present
- Labels: Columbia, Monument, RPM
- Formerly of: McHayes
- Website: Website

Tony Wade Hayes (born April 20, 1969) is an American country music artist. Signed to Columbia Records in 1994, he made his debut that year with his gold-certified album Old Enough to Know Better. Its title track "Old Enough to Know Better", which served as his debut single, reached number one on the Billboard Hot Country Singles & Tracks (now Hot Country Songs) charts. He released two more albums for Columbia Nashville: On a Good Night in 1996 and When the Wrong One Loves You Right in 1998. Later albums were released on Monument Records and independently. In addition to "Old Enough to Know Better", Hayes reached top ten on the Billboard charts with "I'm Still Dancin' with You", "Don't Stop", "What I Meant to Say", "On a Good Night", and "The Day That She Left Tulsa (In a Chevy)".

In 2003, he founded the duo McHayes with Mark McClurg. The duo charted one single on the country charts and recorded one unreleased album for the Universal South label, Lessons in Lonely. Hayes' career was briefly placed on hiatus due to a diagnosis of Stage IV colon cancer, which went into remission in 2012. Hayes has continued to tour and record independently since.

== Biography ==
Wade Hayes was born and raised in Bethel Acres, Oklahoma. His father, Don Hayes, also a professional country musician, inspired him to begin playing music as well. Initially, Hayes had learned to play mandolin, but later switched to guitar after his father bought him one. When he was 11 years old, his family moved to Nashville, Tennessee, where his father signed with an independent record label. The label soon declared bankruptcy. The family returned to Oklahoma, where Wade later found work as a musician in his father's band.

Although he attended three different colleges, Hayes dropped out of college in 1991 in pursuit of a career in country music, after seeing bluegrass musician Ricky Skaggs perform on the 1991 Country Music Association awards show. Wade returned to Nashville, where he began recording demo tapes and writing his own material. Eventually, Hayes partnered with a songwriter named Chick Rains, who recommended him to Don Cook, a record producer who has produced albums for several country music artists, including Brooks & Dunn.

== Musical career ==
=== 1994–1996: Old Enough to Know Better ===
With Cook's help, Hayes was signed to a record deal with Columbia Records in late 1994. The same year, Hayes' debut single, "Old Enough to Know Better", was released, and by early 1995, it peaked at Number One on the Billboard Hot Country Singles & Tracks charts. The single was followed by the release of Hayes' debut album, also titled Old Enough to Know Better, which produced three additional Top Ten singles on the country music charts: "I'm Still Dancin' with You", "Don't Stop" and "What I Meant to Say", at No. 4, No. 10 and No. 5 respectively. It was also certified gold by the Recording Industry Association of America for shipping 500,000 copies. Also in 1995, Hayes was nominated for Top New Male Vocalist of the Year by the Country Music Association.

=== 1996–1997: On a Good Night ===
On a Good Night, Hayes' second album, was released via Columbia in 1996. Although the album's lead-off single (which was the title track) peaked at No. 2 on the country charts, the second and third singles — "Where Do I Go to Start All Over" and "It's over My Head" — both failed to make Top 40. Nonetheless, the album was certified gold as well. Also included on this album was a cover of "Undo the Right", a song originally recorded by Willie Nelson.

=== 1997–1999: When the Wrong One Loves You Right ===
In 1997, Hayes also issued a cover of Glen Campbell's song "Wichita Lineman" as the first single for a third album which was to have been titled Tore Up from the Floor Up. This cover failed to reach Top 40, however, and the album was delayed. It was followed with "The Day That She Left Tulsa (In a Chevy)", which reached No. 5 on the country charts. After this song's release, Hayes's third album – by then re-titled When the Wrong One Loves You Right — was issued, with the Glen Campbell cover omitted. "The Day That She Left Tulsa" was followed by "When the Wrong One Loves You Right", "How Do You Sleep at Night" (his final Top 40 hit at No. 13), and finally, "Tore Up from the Floor Up". Hayes considered When the Wrong One Loves You Right as a more mature effort than his first two albums, with more of an emphasis on ballads than his previous two albums.

=== 2000–2001: Highways and Heartaches ===
By 2000, Hayes had switched from Columbia Records to Monument Records. His fourth and final album before his nine-year hiatus, titled Highways & Heartaches, was released in 2000. Three singles were released from the album before Hayes left Monument.

=== 2001–2004: Duo formation and hiatus ===
In 2003, Hayes joined fiddler Mark McClurg to form the duo McHayes, which charted one single ("It Doesn't Mean I Don't Love You", which reached No. 41 on the country charts) and recorded one unreleased album for Universal South Records. After McHayes disbanded in July 2004, McClurg rejoined Jackson's road band, and Hayes went on hiatus.

=== 2008–2009: Return to music and Place to Turn Around ===
He rejoined the music business in 2008, taking a role as lead guitarist and singer in former Alabama lead singer Randy Owen's road band. Hayes also returned to touring on his own. Hayes released a fifth album, Place to Turn Around, in July 2009, on an independent label. The album features eleven songs, with ten being penned by Hayes.

In 2012, Hayes released the single "Is It Already Time" through RPM Entertainment.

=== 2016–2017: Old Country Song ===
On June 9, 2017, Hayes released Old Country Song. The 11-cut collection of old and new songs was produced by Dave Mcfee and Hayes. It was released on Conabor Records.

== Personal life ==
On April 4, 1999, Hayes married Danni Boatwright. The couple divorced in 2003. Boatwright later was a contestant on the CBS reality television series Survivor.

In December 2011, Hayes was diagnosed with Stage 4 colon cancer, which was successfully operated on that same month. The last tumors were removed in March 2012.

On September 25, 2018, Hayes became engaged to Lea Bayer, a realtor. The two were introduced by her first cousin, country singer John Rich. On December 4, 2018, Billboard Magazine published an article announcing their engagement and Hayes’ new song. They were married on January 25, 2019.

== Discography ==
=== Studio albums ===
Title	Album details	Peak chart positions			Certifications (sales thresholds)
Title	Album details	US Country	US	CAN Country	Certifications (sales thresholds)
Old Enough to Know Better	Release date: January 3, 1995; Label: Columbia Records; Formats: CD, cassette	19	99	—	US: Gold; CAN: Gold
On a Good Night	Release date: June 25, 1996; Label: Columbia Records; Formats: CD, cassette	11	91	—	US: Gold; CAN: Gold
When the Wrong One Loves You Right	Release date: January 27, 1998; Label: Columbia Records; Formats: CD, cassette	9	92	22	
Highways & Heartaches	Release date: September 12, 2000; Label: Monument Records; Formats: CD, cassette	55	—	—	
Place to Turn Around	Release date: July 15, 2009; Label: self-released; Formats: CD, music download	—	—	—	
Go Live Your Life	Release date: February 27, 2015; Label: Conabor Records; Formats: CD, music download	—	—	—	
Old Country Song	Release date: June 9, 2017; Label: Conabor Records; Formats: CD, music download	—	—	—	
"—" denotes releases that did not chart

=== Singles ===
Year	Single	Peak chart positions			Album
Year	Single	US Country	US	CAN Country	Album
1994	"Old Enough to Know Better"	1	—	1	Old Enough to Know Better
1995	"I'm Still Dancin' with You"	4	— (Note: "I'm Still Dancin' with You" did not enter the Hot 100, but peaked at number 13 on Bubbling Under Hot 100 Singles, which acts as a 25-song extension of the Hot 100.)	6	Old Enough to Know Better
1995	"Don't Stop"	10	—	12	Old Enough to Know Better
1995	"What I Meant to Say"	5	— (Note: "What I Meant to Say" did not enter the Hot 100, but peaked at number 16 on Bubbling Under Hot 100 Singles, which acts as a 25-song extension of the Hot 100.)	15	Old Enough to Know Better
1996	"On a Good Night"	2	—	4	On a Good Night
1996	"Where Do I Go to Start All Over"	42	—	59	On a Good Night
1997	"It's Over My Head"	46	—	55	On a Good Night
1997	"Wichita Lineman"	55	—	48	—N/a
1997	"The Day That She Left Tulsa (In a Chevy)"	5	86	9	When the Wrong One Loves You Right
1998	"When the Wrong One Loves You Right"	50	—	41	When the Wrong One Loves You Right
1998	"How Do You Sleep at Night"	13	67	30	When the Wrong One Loves You Right
1999	"Tore Up from the Floor Up"	57	—	—	When the Wrong One Loves You Right
2000	"Up North (Down South, Back East, Out West)"	48	—	73	Highways & Heartaches
2000	"Goodbye Is the Wrong Way to Go"	45	—	—	Highways & Heartaches
2000	"What's It Gonna Take"	—	—	—	Highways & Heartaches
2012	"Is It Already Time?"	—	—	—	—N/a
"—" denotes releases that did not chart

=== Music videos ===
Year	Video	Director
1995	"Old Enough to Know Better"	Gerry Wenner
1995	"I'm Still Dancing with You"	Steven Goldmann
1995	"Don't Stop"	Steven Goldmann
1996	"What I Meant to Say"	Steven Goldmann
1996	"On a Good Night"	Steven Goldmann
1996	"Where Do I Go to Start All Over"	Steven Goldmann
1997	"Wichita Lineman"	Steven Goldmann
1998	"The Day She Left Tulsa (In a Chevy)"	Steven Goldmann
1999	"Tore Up from the Floor Up"	Steven Goldmann
2000	"Up North (Down South, Back East, Out West)"	Jim Shea
2013	"Is It Already Time?"	David Shamban

== Awards and nominations ==
Year	Organization	Award	Nominee/Work	Result
1996	Academy of Country Music Awards	Top New Male Vocalist	Wade Hayes	Nominated
1996	TNN/Music City News Country Awards	Male Star of Tomorrow	Wade Hayes	Nominated
1996	Country Music Association Awards	Horizon Award	Wade Hayes	Nominated
1997	TNN/Music City News Country Awards	Male Star of Tomorrow	Wade Hayes	Won
