= Don Cook =

American record producer and songwriter

- Born: Don Kirby Cook; May 25, 1949 (age 77)
- Origin: San Antonio, Texas
- Genre: Country
- Years active: 1971–present

Don Kirby Cook (born May 25, 1949) is an American record producer and songwriter whose work is mainly in the field of country music. Artists who recorded Cook's material include Barbara Mandrell, John Conlee, Mark Collie, Wade Hayes and Brooks & Dunn. Cook's production work began in the early 1990s when he worked with Brooks & Dunn.

== Musical career ==
Don Cook began writing songs at age twelve and recorded his first demo at age fourteen. He played at various clubs and coffeehouses in Houston, Texas during his teenage years, and moved to Nashville, Tennessee through the suggestion of a friend. Through the assistance of Don Gant, he signed with Acuff-Rose Music. In the 1980s, Cook had several cuts that were released as singles, including "Lady Lay Down" by John Conlee, which was Cook's first Number One as a songwriter.

Cook co-wrote "Brand New Man", the first single release by Brooks & Dunn, and was asked to produce for the duo as well. At first, he was reluctant, but he was encouraged to keep producing after the commercial success of Brooks & Dunn's debut album. Over time, Cook produced most of Brooks & Dunn's material, including thirteen of their songs which went to Number One. Other artists who released his work as singles include Mark Collie, Wade Hayes, Lari White and Steve Wariner.

In 1994, Cook was named Chief Creative Officer and Senior Vice President of Sony/ATV Music Publishing. He retired from both positions in 2004, but has continued to write songs.
