= Now and Again (Daryle Singletary album) =

Compilation album by Daryle Singletary
- Released: July 11, 2000
- Genre: Country
- Length: 33:26
- Label: Audium
- Producer: John Hobbs, David Malloy, James Stroud, Randy Travis

Daryle Singletary chronology
Ain't It the Truth (1998)	Now and Again (2000)	That's Why I Sing This Way (2002)

Professional ratings
Review scores
Source	Rating
AllMusic	3/5 stars
The Encyclopedia of Popular Music	3/5 stars

Now and Again is a compilation album by the American country music singer Daryle Singletary, released in 2000 via Audium.

The album includes six songs from his previous albums for Giant Records: "I Let Her Lie", "Too Much Fun" and "Would These Arms Be in Your Way" from Daryle Singletary, "Amen Kind of Love" from All Because of You, and "You Ain't Heard Nothing Yet" and "The Note" from Ain't It the Truth. It also includes four new tracks in "I've Thought of Everything", "Dumaflache", a cover of Savage Garden's "I Knew I Loved You", and the title track.

"I Knew I Loved You" and "I've Thought of Everything" were both released as singles, peaking at No. 55 and No. 70 on the U.S. country singles charts.

== Critical reception ==
Country Standard Time called the album "fabulous," and compared Singletary to George Jones and Faron Young. Rolling Stone, in article published after Singletary's death, praised the "less polished and a lot more organic" cover of "I Knew I Loved You".

== Track listing ==
1. "Too Much Fun" (Curtis Wright, T.J. Knight) – 2:45
2. "I've Thought of Everything" (Trey Matthews, Daryle Singletary, Kerry Singletary) – 3:28
3. "You Ain't Heard Nothing Yet" (Tony Haselden, Tim Mensy) – 4:10
4. "Amen Kind of Love" (Trey Bruce, Wayne Tester) – 3:29
5. "I Let Her Lie" (Tim Johnson) – 2:58
6. "Would These Arms Be in Your Way" (Hank Cochran, Vern Gosdin, Red Lane) – 3:07
7. "Dumaflache" (Billy Lawson) – 3:18
8. "I Knew I Loved You" (Daniel Jones, Darren Hayes) – 3:31
9. "Now and Again" (Chris Cummings, D. Singletary) – 3:15
10. "The Note" (Buck Moore, Michele Rae) – 3:27
