= Paul Leim =

American drummer

- Born: Paul William Leim; December 29, 1950 (age 75); Port Huron, Michigan, United States
- Origin: Nashville, Tennessee, United States
- Genres: Country music, rock, pop, Contemporary Christian, film music
- Occupation: Musician
- Instruments: Drums, percussion
- Years active: 1970–present
- Website: paulleim.com

Paul William Leim (born December 29, 1950) is an American drummer and recording session musician based in Nashville.

== Biography ==
Leim was born in Port Huron, Michigan and raised in Troup, Texas. He was inspired to take up drumming as a child after hearing the recording of "Skin Deep" by Duke Ellington and his Orchestra featuring Louie Bellson on drums. Robin Hood Brians, a recording studio owner, told Leim he played as if he had a metronome in his head, and invited Leim to play on recordings.

He moved to Los Angeles in his mid 20s to further pursue his music career, and relocated to Nashville in 1988.

Leim has worked with John Williams (Return of the Jedi), Doc Severinsen, The Berlin Orchestra, The London Symphony, The Boston Pops, Lionel Richie, Dolly Parton, Peter Cetera, Tanya Tucker, Randy Travis, Michael W. Smith, Reba McEntire, Kenny Rogers, PUR, Lorrie Morgan, Lyle Lovett, Amy Grant, Collin Raye, Montgomery Gentry, Lonestar, Faith Hill, Bob Seger, Billy Currington, Kenny Chesney, Shania Twain, and others.

Motion picture credits for Leim include The River, Tank, The Legend of DB Cooper, Dirty Dancing, Elvis and Me, Elvis, and Star Wars Return of the Jedi. Episodic television series and specials include Wonder Woman, Knight Rider, Dukes of Hazzard, Elvis, Fall Guy, Spencer for Hire, The Tonight Show, Growing Pains, Battlestar Galactica, Barbara Mandrell and the Mandrell Sisters, and Dolly. He was staff on The Grammy Awards, eight years on Dick Clark's American Music Awards, four years with the Academy of Country Music Awards, and the Grand Ole Opry.

Leim recorded with The Monkees on their 20th anniversary album, Then and Now, including "That was Then and This is Now".

Leim is an eight-time Academy of Country Music drummer of the year Nominee, multiple winner of Nashville Music Award, "Drummer/Percussionist", and Nashville Music Row Magazine's "Top 10 Music All Stars" award winner. Most recently he is winner of "Drum Magazine" Drummie of the Year, (Country Category) 4 Years in a Row and Modern Drummer Magazine "Reader's Poll", Drummer of the Year, (Country Category) for an Eighth year in a Row (2001 – 2008).

=== Touring ===
Leim has toured with:

- Tom Jones (1977–1978)
- Randy Travis (1995–1998)
- Neil Diamond (1977, 1999)
- Tanya Tucker (1978)
- Faith Hill and Tim McGraw (2006)
- Elvis: The Concert (2005–2012)
- TCB Band (2005–2012, 2021-present)
- Lynda Carter (2008–2011)
- Mike Nesmith (2013)

=== Personal life ===
Leim lives in Nashville with his wife Jeanie. He is a licensed pilot and has owned several aircraft.

== Discography ==
=== 1970–1984 ===
This section presents a partial list of albums to which Leim has contributed.

- 1970: Will Barnes - No Place But Texas (Armadillo Country)
- 1976: Doc Severinsen - Night Journey (Epic)
- 1976: David Meece - David (Myrrh)
- 1978: Pink Lady - America! America! America! (Victor)
- 1978: Tanya Tucker - TNT (MCA)
- 1979: Michael Nesmith - Infinite Rider on the Big Dogma (Pacific Arts)
- 1979: The Imperials - One More Song for You (Dayspring Records)
- 1980: Debby Boone - With My Song (Lamb & Lion)
- 1980: The Imperials - Priority (Dayspring)
- 1980: David Meece - Are You Ready? (Myrrh)
- 1981: Joe Chemay Band - The Riper the Finer (Unicorn)
- 1981: Kenny Rogers - Share Your Love (Liberty)
- 1982: Shirley Bassey - All By Myself (Applause)
- 1982: Amy Grant - Age to Age (Myrrh)
- 1982: Lionel Richie - Lionel Richie (Motown)
- 1982: Kenny Rogers - Love Will Turn You Around (Liberty)
- 1983: Lionel Richie - Can't Slow Down (Motown)
- 1983: Kenny Rogers - Eyes That See in the Dark (RCA)
- 1983: Kenny Rogers - We've Got Tonight (Liberty)
- 1983: Amy Grant - A Christmas Album (Myrrh)
- 1983: David Meece - Count the Cost (Myrrh)
- 1984: Amy Grant - Straight Ahead (Myrrh)
- 1984: Evelyn "Champagne" King - So Romantic (RCA)
- 1984: Eddie Rabbitt - The Best Year of My Life (Mercury)
- 1984: Kenny and Dolly - Once Upon a Christmas (RCA)
- 1984: Michael W. Smith - Michael W. Smith 2 (Reunion Records)
- 1984: Kathy Troccoli - Heart and Soul (Reunion)
- 1984: Wayne Watson - Man In The Middle (Milk & Honey)

=== 1985–1987 ===
- 1985: Rosanne Cash - Rhythm and Romance (Columbia)
- 1985: Debby Boone - Choose Life (Lamb & Lion)
- 1985: Amy Grant - Unguarded (Myrrh)
- 1985: Whitney Houston - Whitney Houston (Arista)
- 1985: Dolly Parton - Real Love (RCA)
- 1985: Diana Ross - Eaten Alive (RCA)
- 1985: Maurice White - Maurice White (Columbia)
- 1985: Russ Taff - Medals (Myrrh)
- 1985: The Imperials - Let the Wind Blow (Myrrh)
- 1985: Steve Camp - Shake Me to Wake Me (Sparrow Records)
- 1985: David Meece - 7 (Myrrh)
- 1986: Billy Burnette - Soldier of Love (MCA / Curb)
- 1986: Belinda Carlisle - Belinda (IRS)
- 1986: Peter Cetera - Solitude/Solitaire (Warner Bros.)
- 1986: Stacy Lattisaw - Take Me All the Way (Motown)
- 1986: Sandi Patti - Morning Like This (A&M)
- 1986: Lionel Richie - Dancing on the Ceiling (Motown)
- 1986: Kathy Troccoli - Images (Reunion)
- 1987: Air Supply - The Christmas Album (Arista)
- 1987: Richard Carpenter - Time (A&M)
- 1987: Duane Eddy - Duane Eddy (Capitol)
- 1987: Whitney Houston - Whitney (Arista)
- 1987: Kashif - Love Changes (Arista)
- 1987: Gladys Knight & the Pips - All Our Love (MCA)
- 1987: Meli'sa Morgan - Good Love (Capitol)
- 1987: Kenny Rogers - I Prefer the Moonlight (RCA)
- 1987: Teen Dream - Let's Get Busy (Warner Bros.)
- 1987: Dionne Warwick - Reservations for Two (Arista)
- 1987: Russ Taff - Russ Taff (A&M)
- 1987: The Imperials - This Year’s Model (Myrrh)
- 1987: Roy Orbison - "In Dreams" (Virgin)
- 1987: Patrick Swayze - “She’s Like the Wind” (RCA)

=== 1988–1990 ===
- 1988: Neil Diamond - The Best Years of Our Lives (Columbia)
- 1988: Amy Grant - Lead Me On (A&M)
- 1988: Michael W. Smith - I 2 (EYE) (Reunion)
- 1988: The Imperials - Free the Fire (Myrrh)
- 1988: BeBe & CeCe Winans - Heaven (Sparrow/Capitol)
- 1988: Bette Midler - Beaches (Atlantic)
- 1988: Billy Joe Walker Jr. - Universal Language (MCA)
- 1989: Animotion - Animotion (Room to Move) (Mercury)
- 1989: Scott Grimes - Scott Grimes (A&M)
- 1989: Lyle Lovett - Lyle Lovett and His Large Band (MCA / Curb)
- 1989: Barry Manilow - Barry Manilow (Arista)
- 1989: The Oak Ridge Boys - American Dreams (MCA)
- 1989: Kenny Rogers - Something Inside So Strong (Reprise)
- 1989: Randy Travis - No Holdin' Back (Warner Bros.)
- 1989: Billy Joe Walker, Jr. - Painting Music (MCA)
- 1989: Michael W. Smith - Christmas (Reunion)
- 1989: Carman - Revival in the Land (Benson Records)
- 1989: David Meece - Learning to Trust (Star Song Communications)
- 1990: Beth Nielsen Chapman - Beth Nielsen Chapman (Reprise)
- 1990: Kenny Rogers - Love Is Strange (Reprise)
- 1990: Randy Travis - "Heroes & Friends" (Warner Bros.)
- 1990: Tanya Tucker - Tennessee Woman (Capitol Nashville)
- 1990: Andy Williams - I Still Believe in Santa Claus (Curb)
- 1990: Steven Curtis Chapman - For the Sake of the Call (Sparrow Records)
- 1990: Michael W. Smith - Go West Young Man (Reunion)
- 1990: Steve Camp - Doing My Best: Volume 1 (Sparrow)
- 1990: Bruce Carroll - The Great Exchange (Word Records)

=== 1991–1992 ===
- 1991: Glen Campbell - Show Me Your Way (New Haven)
- 1991: Michael English - Michael English (Warner Alliance)
- 1991: George Jones - And Along Came Jones (MCA)
- 1991: Shelby Lynne - Soft Talk (Epic)
- 1991: Lorrie Morgan - Something in Red (RCA)
- 1991: Collin Raye - All I Can Be (Epic)
- 1991: Mike Reid - Turning for Home (Columbia)
- 1991: Kenny Rogers - Back Home Again (Reprise)
- 1991: Jo-El Sonnier - Tears of Joy (Capitol Nashville)
- 1991: Les Taylor - Blue Kentucky Wind (Epic)
- 1991: Pam Tillis - Put Yourself in My Place (Arista)
- 1991: Randy Travis - High Lonesome (Warner Bros.)
- 1991: Tanya Tucker - What Do I Do with Me (Capitol Nashville)
- 1991: Billy Joe Walker Jr. - The Walk (Geffen)
- 1991: Steve Camp - Consider the Cost (Sparrow)
- 1992: Mark Chesnutt - Longnecks & Short Stories (MCA)
- 1992: Kathie Lee Gifford - Sentimental Journey (Heartland)
- 1992: Amy Grant - Home for Christmas (A&M)
- 1992: Martina McBride - The Time Has Come (RCA)
- 1992: Reba McEntire - It's Your Call (MCA)
- 1992: Lorrie Morgan - Watch Me (BNA / BMG)
- 1992: Pam Tillis - Homeward Looking Angel (Arista)
- 1992: Tanya Tucker - Can't Run from Yourself (Liberty)
- 1992: Steven Curtis Chapman - The Great Adventure (Sparrow)
- 1992: 4Him - The Basics of Life (Benson Records)
- 1992: Dennis Robbins - Man With a Plan (Giant)

=== 1993–1994 ===
- 1993: Steve Camp - Taking Heaven By Storm (Warner Alliance)
- 1993: Glen Campbell - Somebody Like That (Liberty)
- 1993: Mark Chesnutt - Almost Goodbye (MCA)
- 1993: Darryl & Don Ellis - Day in the Sun (Epic)
- 1993: Kathie Lee Gifford - Sentimental (Warner Bros.)
- 1993: John Jarvis - Balancing Act (Liberty)
- 1993: Tim McGraw - Tim McGraw (Curb)
- 1993: Kenny Rogers - If Only My Heart Had a Voice (Giant)
- 1993: Twila Paris - Beyond a Dream (Twila Paris album) (Star Song)
- 1993: Shania Twain - Shania Twain (Mercury)
- 1993: Rhonda Vincent - Written in the Stars (Giant Nashville)
- 1993: Michael English - Hope (Curb)
- 1993: Carman - The Standard (Sparrow)
- 1994: Peter Hofmann - Country Roads (Columbia)
- 1994: Prescott-Brown - Already Restless (Columbia)
- 1994: Mark Chesnutt - What a Way to Live (Decca)
- 1994: Sammy Kershaw - Feelin' Good Train (Mercury Nashville)
- 1994: Sammy Kershaw - Christmas Time's A-Comin' (Mercury Nashville)
- 1994: Lorrie Morgan - War Paint (BNA)
- 1994: Collin Raye - Extremes (Epic)
- 1994: Randy Travis - This is Me (Warner Bros.)
- 1994: Clay Walker - If I Could Make a Living (Giant)
- 1994: Bryan White - Bryan White (Asylum)
- 1994: Michelle Wright - The Reasons Why (Arista)
- 1994: Wayne Watson - One Christmas Eve (Word Records)

=== 1995–1996 ===
- 1995: 4 Runner - 4 Runner (Polydor Nashville)
- 1995: Peter Cetera - One Clear Voice (River North)
- 1995: Philip Claypool - A Circus Leaving Town (Curb)
- 1995: Mark Collie - Tennessee Plates (Giant)
- 1995: Ty England - Ty England (RCA / BMG)
- 1995: Ty Herndon - What Mattered Most (Epic)
- 1995: Shelby Lynne - Restless (Magnatone)
- 1995: The Oak Ridge Boys - Country Christmas Eve (Capitol Nashville)
- 1995: Point of Grace - The Whole Truth (Word / Epic)
- 1995: Clay Crosse - Time to Believe (Reunion)
- 1995: Collin Raye - I Think About You (Epic)
- 1995: Victoria Shaw - In Full View (Reprise)
- 1995: Daryle Singletary - Daryle Singletary (Giant)
- 1995: Doug Supernaw - You Still Got Me (Giant)
- 1995: Shania Twain - The Woman in Me (Mercury Nashville)
- 1995: Steven Curtis Chapman - The Music of Christmas (Sparrow)
- 1995: Russ Taff - Winds of Change (Warner Alliance)
- 1995: Wayne Watson - Field of Souls (Warner Alliance)
- 1996: Neil Diamond - Tennessee Moon (Columbia)
- 1996: Ty England - Two Ways to Fall (RCA)
- 1996: Ty Herndon - Living in a Moment (Epic)
- 1996: George Jones - I Lived to Tell It All (MCA)
- 1996: Sammy Kershaw - Politics, Religion and Her (Mercury)
- 1996: Barry Manilow - Summer of '78 (Arista)
- 1996: Mindy McCready - Ten Thousand Angels (BNA)
- 1996: Lorrie Morgan - Greater Need (BNA)
- 1996: Rich Mullins - Songs (Reunion)
- 1996: Danielle Peck - Danielle Peck (Big Machine)
- 1996: Collin Raye - Christmas: The Gift (Epic)
- 1996: Kenny Rogers - The Gift (Curb / MCA)
- 1996: Kevin Sharp - Measure of a Man (143 / Asylum)
- 1996: Daryle Singletary - All Because of You (Giant)
- 1996: Randy Travis - Full Circle (Warner Bros. Nashville)
- 1996: Rhonda Vincent - Trouble Free (Giant)
- 1996: Steve Wariner - No More Mr. Nice Guy (Arista)
- 1996: Bryan White - Between Now and Forever (Asylum)

=== 1997–1998 ===
- 1997: Sherrié Austin - Words (Arista Nashville)
- 1997: Richard Carpenter - Pianist, Arranger, Composer, Conductor (A&M)
- 1997: Mark Chesnutt - Thank God for Believers (Decca)
- 1997: The Manhattan Transfer - Swing (Atlantic)
- 1997: Neal McCoy - Be Good at It (Atlantic)
- 1997: Mindy McCready - If I Don't Stay the Night (BNA)
- 1997: Beth Nielsen Chapman - Sand and Water (Reprise)
- 1997: Ricochet - Blink of an Eye (Columbia)
- 1997: Kenny Rogers - Across My Heart (Magnatone)
- 1997: Ricky Skaggs - Life Is a Journey (Atlantic)
- 1997: Shania Twain - Come On Over (Mercury)
- 1997: Bryan White - The Right Place (Asylum)
- 1998: Billy Ray Cyrus - Shot Full of Love (Mercury)
- 1998: Ty Herndon - Big Hopes (Epic)
- 1998: Faith Hill - Faith (Warner Bros.)
- 1998: Reba McEntire - If You See Him (MCA Nashville)
- 1998: Olivia Newton-John - Back With a Heart (MCA Nashville)
- 1998: Point of Grace - Steady On (Word / Sony)
- 1998: Collin Raye - The Walls Came Down (Epic)
- 1998: Lionel Richie - Time (Mercury)
- 1998: Kevin Sharp - Love Is (Asylum)
- 1998: Daryle Singletary - Ain't It the Truth (Giant)
- 1998: Randy Travis - You and You Alone (DreamWorks Nashville)
- 1998: Travis Tritt - No More Looking over My Shoulder (Warner Bros. Nashville)
- 1998: Steve Wariner - Burnin' the Roadhouse Down (Capitol)
- 1998: Trisha Yearwood - Where Your Road Leads (MCA Nashville)
- 1998: Michael W. Smith - Christmastime (Reunion)

=== 1999–2001 ===
- 1999: Tracy Byrd - It's About Time (RCA)
- 1999: Kenny Chesney - Everywhere We Go (BNA)
- 1999: Philip Claypool - Perfect World (Curb / MCA)
- 1999: Jimmy Dean - 20 Great Story Songs (Curb)
- 1999: Toby Keith - How Do You Like Me Now?! (DreamWorks)
- 1999: Matt King - Hard Country (Atlantic)
- 1999: Lace - Lace (143 / Warner Bros.)
- 1999: Lonestar - Lonely Grill (BNA)
- 1999: Lila McCann - Something in the Air (Asylum)
- 1999: Neal McCoy - The Life of the Party (Atlantic)
- 1999: Mindy McCready - I'm Not So Tough (BNA)
- 1999: Reba McEntire - So Good Together (MCA)
- 1999: Montgomery Gentry - Tattoos & Scars (Columbia)
- 1999: Sawyer Brown - Drive Me Wild (Curb)
- 1999: SHeDAISY - The Whole SHeBANG (Lyric Street)
- 1999: Randy Travis - A Man Ain't Made of Stone (DreamWorks Nashville)
- 1999: Steve Wariner - Two Teardrops (Capitol)
- 1999: Chely Wright - Single White Female (MCA Nashville)
- 1999: Point of Grace - A Christmas Story (Word)
- 2000: Chad Brock - Yes! (Warner Bros.)
- 2000: Ronan Keating - Ronan (Polydor)
- 2000: Loretta Lynn - Still Country (Audium)
- 2000: Collin Raye - Counting Sheep (Sony)
- 2000: Collin Raye - Tracks (Epic)
- 2000: Kenny Rogers - There You Go Again (Dreamcatcher)
- 2000: Daryle Singletary - Now and Again (Audium / Koch)
- 2000: Randy Travis - Inspirational Journey (Word / Warner Bros. Nashville / Curb)
- 2001: Tracy Byrd - Ten Rounds (RCA Nashville)
- 2001: Tammy Cochran - Tammy Cochran (Epic)
- 2001: Rodney Crowell - The Houston Kid (Sugar Hill)
- 2001: Hal Ketchum - Lucky Man (Curb)
- 2001: Lila McCann - Complete (Warner Bros. Nashville)
- 2001: Lorrie Morgan and Sammy Kershaw - I Finally Found Someone (RCA)
- 2001: LeAnn Rimes - LeAnn Rimes (Curb)
- 2001: Pam Tillis - Thunder & Roses (Arista Nashville)
- 2001: Chely Wright - Never Love You Enough (MCA Nashville)

=== 2002–2004 ===
- 2002: Kenny Chesney - No Shoes, No Shirt, No Problems (BNA / BMG)
- 2002: Mark Chesnutt - Mark Chesnutt (Columbia Nashville)
- 2002: Tammy Cochran - Life Happened (Epic)
- 2002: Kellie Coffey - When You Lie Next to Me (BNA)
- 2002: Mindy McCready - Mindy McCready (Capitol Nashville)
- 2002: Jo Dee Messina - A Joyful Noise (Curb)
- 2002: Selah - Rose of Bethlehem (Curb MCA)
- 2002: Daryle Singletary - That's Why I Sing This Way (Audium / Koch)
- 2002: Tommy Shane Steiner - Then Came the Night (RCA)
- 2002: Randy Travis - Rise and Shine (Word / Warner Bros. / Curb)
- 2002: Shania Twain - Up! (Mercury)
- 2003: Tracy Byrd - The Truth About Men (RCA Nashville)
- 2003: Rodney Crowell - Fate's Right Hand (DMZ / Epic)
- 2003: Billy Ray Cyrus - The Other Side (Word)
- 2003: Sammy Kershaw - I Want My Money Back (Audium / Koch)
- 2003: Reba McEntire - Room to Breathe (MCA Nashville)
- 2003: Craig Morgan - I Love It (Broken Bow)
- 2003: Kenny Rogers - Back to the Well (Sanctuary)
- 2003: Hank Williams Jr. - I'm One of You (Curb)
- 2004: Ronnie Milsap - Just for a Thrill (Image Entertainment)
- 2004: Lorrie Morgan - Show Me How (Image Entertainment)
- 2004: Randy Travis - Passing Through (Word / Warner Bros. / Curb)

=== 2005–2007 ===
- 2005: Kenny Chesney - The Road and the Radio (BNA / BMG)
- 2005: Kenny Chesney - Be as You Are (BNA / BMG)
- 2005: Billy Dean - Let Them Be Little (Curb)
- 2005: Billy Gilman - Everything and More (Image Entertainment)
- 2005: Collin Raye - Twenty Years and Change (Aspirion)
- 2005: Sawyer Brown - Mission Temple Fireworks Stand (Curb)
- 2006: Billy Gilman - Billy Gilman (Image Entertainment)
- 2006: Steve Holy - Brand New Girlfriend (Curb)
- 2006: Jack Ingram - Live: Wherever You Are (Big Machine)
- 2006: Sammy Kershaw - Honky Tonk Boots (Category 5)
- 2006: Bob Seger - Face the Promise (Capitol)
- 2007: Luke Bryan - I'll Stay Me (Capitol / EMI)
- 2007: Kenny Chesney - Just Who I Am: Poets & Pirates (BNA / BMG)
- 2007: Cledus T. Judd - Boogity, Boogity – A Tribute to the Comedic Genius of Ray Stevens (Asylum / Curb)
- 2007: Reba McEntire - Duets (MCA Nashville)
- 2007: Randy Travis - Songs of the Season (Word)
- 2007: Michael W. Smith - It's a Wonderful Christmas (Reunion)

=== 2008–2009 ===
- 2008: Laura Bryna - Trying to Be Me (Equity Music Group)
- 2008: Kenny Chesney - Lucky Old Sun (BNA / BMG)
- 2008: Billy Currington - Little Bit of Everything (Mercury Nashville)
- 2008: Hal Ketchum - Father Time (Asylum / Curb)
- 2008: Richie McDonald - I Turn to You (Stroudavarious)
- 2008: Willie Nelson - Moment of Forever (Lost Highway)
- 2008: Olivia Newton-John - A Celebration in Song (EMI)
- 2008: Randy Travis - Around the Bend (Cozat)
- 2009: Luke Bryan - Doin' My Thing (Capitol Nashville)
- 2009: Lynda Carter - At Last (Potomac)
- 2009: Terri Clark - The Long Way Home (Capitol / BareTrack)
- 2009: Kelly Clarkson - All I Ever Wanted (RCA / 19 Recordings / S Records)
- 2009: Jason Crabb - Jason Crabb (Spring Hill Music Group)
- 2009: Daryle Singletary - Rockin' in the Country (E1 Music)
- 2009: Steve Wariner - My Tribute to Chet Atkins (SelecTone)
- 2009: Hank Williams Jr. - 127 Rose Avenue (Curb)

=== 2010–present ===
- 2010: Billy Currington - Enjoy Yourself (Mercury)
- 2010: Joey + Rory - Album Number Two (Sugar Hill / Vanguard)
- 2010: Mindy McCready - I'm Still Here (Iconic)
- 2010: Jon Secada - Classics (Big 3)
- 2011: Lynda Carter - Crazy Little Things (Potomac)
- 2011: Billy Ray Cyrus - I'm American (Disney)
- 2011: Scotty McCreery - Clear as Day (Mercury Nashville / 19 / Interscope)
- 2012: Chris Cagle - Back in the Saddle (Bigger Picture Music Group)
- 2012: Kenny Chesney - Welcome to the Fishbowl (Columbia Nashville)
- 2012: Lionel Richie - Tuskegee (Mercury)
- 2012: Carrie Underwood - Blown Away (19 / Arista Nashville)
- 2013: Kenny Chesney - Life on a Rock (Columbia Nashville)
- 2013: Billy Currington - We Are Tonight (Mercury Nashville)
- 2014: Kenny Chesney - The Big Revival (Columbia Nashville)
- 2014: Michael Nesmith - Movies of the Mind (Pacific Arts)
- 2015: Brian Setzer Orchestra - Rockin' Rudolph (Surfdog)
