= 2018 in country music =

This is a list of notable events in country music that took place in 2018.

== Events ==
- January – The critically acclaimed ABC/CMT series Nashville announces it will stop production after its sixth season which premiered on January 4, 2018. The show's last episode aired on July 26, 2018.
- January 17 – Kenny Chesney announces that he has left Sony Music Nashville after 23 years and has subsequently signed with Warner Music Nashville.
- February 2 – Montgomery Gentry release their final album together, Here's to You, following the death of Troy Gentry in September 2017.
- April 14 – Weeks after his impromptu performance of the Hank Williams Sr. hit song "Lovesick Blues" at his local Wal-Mart in southern Illinois had made him a viral country phenomenon, 11 year old Mason Ramsey realizes his dream of performing at the Grand Ole Opry. Five years later, a teenaged Ramsey would return to the Opry, performing the song again on the 75th anniversary of the country standard.
- April 15 – The Academy of Country Music awards return to Las Vegas for the first time since the October 2017 Las Vegas shooting, with Reba McEntire returning as host; Carrie Underwood makes her comeback performance after months out of the public eye while recovering from injuries she suffered in a fall at home.
- April 30 – USA Network announces Real Country, a reality competition show designed to find the next big country star and featuring Travis Tritt, Jake Owen and Shania Twain as judges.
- June 8 – Sugarland returns with the release of their first album together since 2010, Bigger.
- June 25 – Fox announces it will air "iHeartCountry Festival", featuring headliners Luke Bryan, Keith Urban, and more in August.
- June 26 – Dolly Parton, Emmylou Harris, Linda Ronstadt, and Faith Hill are announced to receive stars on the Hollywood Walk of Fame in 2019.
- July 25 – Reba McEntire is announced as one of the recipients of the 2018 Kennedy Center Honors.
- August 8 – Carrie Underwood announces her pregnancy with her second child.
- September 20 – Carrie Underwood receives her star on the Hollywood Walk of Fame.
- November 20 – Jimmie Allen reaches number one on Country Airplay with "Best Shot", making him the first African American to send a debut single to the top of that chart.

== Top hits of the year ==
The following songs placed within the Top 20 on the Hot Country Songs, Country Airplay, or Canada Country charts in 2018:

=== Singles released by American and Australian artists ===
Songs	Airplay	Canada	Single	Artist	References
21	11	22	"All Day Long"	Garth Brooks	
6	2	2	"All on Me"	Devin Dawson	
8	17	16	"Babe"	Sugarland featuring Taylor Swift	
5	1	1	"Best Shot"	Jimmie Allen	
5	1	2	"Blue Tacoma"	Russell Dickerson	
19	18	26	"Born to Love You"	LANCO	
14	16	50	"Boy"	Lee Brice	
4	2	34	"Break Up in the End"	Cole Swindell	
5	1	3	"Broken Halos"	Chris Stapleton	
11	3	1	"Coming Home"	Keith Urban featuring Julia Michaels	
5	9	8	"Cry Pretty"	Carrie Underwood	
8	13	4	"Desperate Man"	Eric Church	
14	15	22	"Downtown's Dead"	Sam Hunt	
3	1	1	"Drowns the Whiskey"	Jason Aldean featuring Miranda Lambert	
12	7	25	"Drunk Girl"	Chris Janson	
6	2	2	"Drunk Me"	Mitchell Tenpenny	
9	1	16	"Everything's Gonna Be Alright"	David Lee Murphy & Kenny Chesney	
4	—	—	"Famous"	Mason Ramsey	
11	12	3	"Female"	Keith Urban	
4	1	2	"Five More Minutes"	Scotty McCreery	
7	1	6	"For the First Time"	Darius Rucker	
2	1	1	"Get Along"	Kenny Chesney	
17	15	43	"Get to You"	Michael Ray	
15	6	10	"A Girl Like You"	Easton Corbin	
8	2	4	"Hangin' On"	Chris Young	
18	13	32	"Happens Like That"	Granger Smith	
22	15	33	"Heart Break"	Lady Antebellum	
2	1	1	"Heaven"	Kane Brown	
21	13	13	"Hide the Wine"	Carly Pearce	
6	2	14	"Hooked"	Dylan Scott	
5	1	2	"Hotel Key"	Old Dominion	
7	1	14	"I Could Use a Love Song"	Maren Morris	
8	3	3	"I Lived It"	Blake Shelton	
7	1	1	"I Was Jack (You Were Diane)"	Jake Owen	
28	17	43	"Kinda Don't Care"	Justin Moore	
11	3	20	"Kiss Somebody"	Morgan Evans	
12	6	23	"Last Shot"	Kip Moore	
10	1	3	"Legends"	Kelsea Ballerini	
6	1	1	"Life Changes"	Thomas Rhett	
3	1	1	"Like I Loved You"	Brett Young	
7	3	7	"The Long Way"	Brett Eldredge	
1	1	1	"Lose It"	Kane Brown	
7	1	2	"Losing Sleep"	Chris Young	
23	15	12	"Make a Little"	Midland	
2	1	1	"Marry Me"	Thomas Rhett	
1	1	7	"Meant to Be"	Bebe Rexha & Florida Georgia Line	
2	1	8	"Mercy"	Brett Young	
4	1	1	"Most People Are Good"	Luke Bryan	
14	—	—	"Must've Never Met You"	Luke Combs	
24	20	35	"Neon Church"	Tim McGraw	
3	1	1	"One Number Away"	Luke Combs	
22	15	38	"The Ones That Like Me"	Brantley Gilbert	
18	25	48	"The Rest of Our Life"	Tim McGraw and Faith Hill	
8	4	2	"Rich"	Maren Morris	
7	2	8	"Round Here Buzz"	Eric Church	
2	1	1	"She Got the Best of Me"	Luke Combs	
2	1	1	"Simple"	Florida Georgia Line	
4	1	1	"Singles You Up"	Jordan Davis	
1	1	2	"Speechless"	Dan + Shay	
4	1	2	"Sunrise, Sunburn, Sunset"	Luke Bryan	
12	8	3	"Take Back Home Girl"	Chris Lane featuring Tori Kelly	
1	1	1	"Tequila"	Dan + Shay	
14	10	20	"Turnin' Me On"	Blake Shelton	
5	1	1	"Up Down"	Morgan Wallen featuring Florida Georgia Line	
7	1	1	"Woman, Amen"	Dierks Bentley	
3	1	1	"Written in the Sand"	Old Dominion	
9	10	17	"You Broke Up with Me"	Walker Hayes	
2	1	1	"You Make It Easy"	Jason Aldean	
3	1	2	"Yours"	Russell Dickerson	

=== Singles released by Canadian artists ===
Songs	Airplay	Canada	Single	Artist	References
—	—	1	"8th Day"	Dean Brody	
—	—	15	"18 Ends"	Petric	
—	—	9	"All About Her"	Paul Brandt	
—	—	8	"Anthem"	Brett Kissel	
—	—	12	"The Bad Guy"	Meghan Patrick	
—	—	16	"Bittersweet"	Paul Brandt featuring Lindsay Ell	
—	—	19	"Blame It on the Neon"	Leaving Thomas	
—	—	9	"Born and Raised"	Hunter Brothers	
—	—	7	"Camouflage"	Jess Moskaluke	
—	—	5	"Country Music Made Me Do It"	Meghan Patrick	
28	19	1	"Criminal"	Lindsay Ell	
—	—	3	"Dear Drunk Me"	Chad Brownlee	
—	—	5	"Denim on Denim"	Tebey	
—	—	1	"Dive Bar"	Gord Bamford	
—	—	8	"Do It with You"	Andrew Hyatt	
—	—	13	"Downtown Kids"	David James	
—	—	11	"Feel Like That"	Washboard Union	
—	—	10	"Forever Rebels"	Tim Hicks	
—	—	18	"Get Me There"	Shawn Austin	
—	—	6	"Good Goodbye"	Dean Brody	
—	—	6	"Good Together"	James Barker Band	
—	—	6	"Got Your Name on It"	Jade Eagleson	
—	—	8	"Guitars and Gasoline"	Brett Kissel	
—	—	12	"Habit"	Andrew Hyatt	
—	—	16	"Little Girl"	Kira Isabella	
—	—	6	"Long Live the Night"	The Reklaws	
—	—	4	"Loud"	Tim Hicks	
—	—	1	"Make 'Em Like You"	Dallas Smith	
—	—	9	"Miss Me Yet"	Aaron Goodvin	
—	—	13	"Money"	Cold Creek County	
—	—	11	"Neon Love"	Madeline Merlo	
—	—	10	"Neon Smoke"	Gord Bamford	
—	—	3	"One Drink Ago"	Dallas Smith & Terri Clark	
—	—	6	"The Road"	Emerson Drive	
11	7	—	"She's with Me" (U.S. release)	High Valley	
—	—	1	"Sleepin' Around"	Dallas Smith	
—	—	16	"Sun Set on It"	David James	
—	—	9	"Those Were the Nights"	Hunter Brothers	
—	—	1	"Walls Come Down"	Meghan Patrick	
—	—	15	"What We're Made Of"	Washboard Union	
—	—	1	"Who's Gonna Love You"	Tebey	
—	—	17	"The Worst Kind"	Tim Hicks & Lindsay Ell	
—	—	6	"Worth a Shot"	Aaron Pritchett	
—	—	10	"Young Forever"	High Valley	

=== Notes ===
- "—" denotes releases that did not chart
- A Current singles.

== Top new album releases ==
The following albums placed on the Top Country Albums charts in 2018:

US	Album	Artist	Record label	Release date	Reference
1	All of It	Cole Swindell	Warner Bros. Nashville	August 17	
5	Amos	Michael Ray	Atlantic Nashville	June 1	
2	Bigger	Sugarland	Big Machine	June 8	
5	Creeker	Upchurch	Redneck Nation	April 20	
1	Cry Pretty	Carrie Underwood	19/Capitol Nashville	September 14	
1	Dan + Shay	Dan + Shay	Warner Bros. Nashville	June 22	
5	Dark Horse	Devin Dawson	Warner Bros. Nashville	January 19	
1	Experiment	Kane Brown	RCA Nashville	November 9	
1	Desperate Man	Eric Church	EMI Nashville	October 5	
3	Find a Light	Blackberry Smoke	3 Legged Records	April 6	
10	Florida Georgia Line (EP)	Florida Georgia Line	Republic Nashville	June 1	
7	Girl Going Nowhere	Ashley McBryde	Warner Bros. Nashville	March 30	
1	Golden Hour	Kacey Musgraves	MCA Nashville	March 30	
1	Graffiti U	Keith Urban	Capitol Nashville	April 27	
1	Hallelujah Nights	LANCO	Arista Nashville	January 19	
3	Here's to You	Montgomery Gentry	Average Joes	February 2	
6	Home State	Jordan Davis	MCA Nashville	March 23	
2	I Serve a Savior	Josh Turner	MCA Nashville	October 26	
1	If I Know Me	Morgan Wallen	Big Loud Mountain	April 27	
1	Interstate Gospel	Pistol Annies	RCA Nashville	November 2	
9	Johnny Cash: Forever Words	Various Artists	Legacy	April 6	
8	Laps Around the Sun	Chris Lane	Big Loud	July 13	
3	Last Man Standing	Willie Nelson	Legacy	April 27	
2	Lifers	Cody Jinks	Rounder	July 27	
3	Live from the Ryman	Jason Isbell	Thirty Tigers	October 19	
1	The Mountain	Dierks Bentley	Capitol Nashville	June 8	
6	Now That's What I Call Country, Volume 11	Various Artists	Sony Music/Universal	June 8	
2	Port Saint Joe	Brothers Osborne	EMI Nashville	April 20	
1	Rearview Town	Jason Aldean	Broken Bow	April 13	
4	Restoration: Reimagining the Songs of Elton John and Bernie Taupin	Various Artists	UMG Nashville	April 6	
1	Seasons Change	Scotty McCreery	Triple Tigers	March 16	
1	Songs for the Saints	Kenny Chesney	Warner Music Nashville	July 27	
6	Supernatural	Upchurch	Redneck Nation	September 7	
5	Telling All My Secrets	Mitchell Tenpenny	Riser House/Columbia Nashville	December 14	
9	Things That We Drink To	Morgan Evans	Warner Music Nashville	October 12	
1	Ticket to L.A.	Brett Young	Big Machine	December 7	
2	The Tree of Forgiveness	John Prine	Oh Boy Records	April 13	
9	Water (EP)	Sister Hazel	Croakin' Poets	February 9	
8	Wouldn't It Be Great	Loretta Lynn	Legacy	September 28	

=== Other top albums ===
US	Album	Artist	Record label	Release date	Reference
13	Ameracal	Adam Calhoun	Adam Calhoun	March 16	
40	The Anthology Part III, LIVE	Garth Brooks	Pearl Records	November 20	
29	The Biggest Hits of Tim McGraw	Tim McGraw	Curb Records	June 15	
24	Dirt Rock	The Lacs	Average Joes	May 4	
41	Downey to Lubbock	Dave Alvin & Jimmie Dale Gilmore	Yep Roc	June 1	
16	Dumplin'	Dolly Parton	RCA Nashville/Dolly Records	November 30	
38	Elvis: '68 Comeback Special: 50th Anniversary Edition (soundtrack)	Elvis Presley	RCA Legacy	November 30	
17	Elvis Presley: The Searcher (Soundtrack)	Elvis Presley	RCA Legacy	April 6	
19	Hard Times and White Lines	Whitey Morgan and the 78's	Whitey Morgan Music	October 26	
11	Mercury Lane	Jimmie Allen	Broken Bow/Stoney Creek	October 12	
35	Mitchell Tenpenny (EP)	Mitchell Tenpenny	Riser House	February 23	
35	No Zip Code	David Lee Murphy	Reviver	April 6	
41	One Drop of Truth	The Wood Brothers	Honey Jar	February 2	
27	Project X, Volume 1	Upchurch x Bottleneck	Redneck Nation	January 26	
21	River Rat	Upchurch	Redneck Nation	December 21	
20	Room to Spare: The Acoustic Sessions	Kip Moore	MCA Nashville	November 16	
16	She Remembers Everything	Rosanne Cash	Blue Note Records	November 2	
42	Shooter	Shooter Jennings	Low Country Sound	August 10	
27	Solid Ground	Wade Bowen	Lil' Buddy Toons	February 9	
29	Sometimes Just the Sky	Mary Chapin Carpenter	Lambent Light	March 30	
17	Songs of the Plains	Colter Wall	Young Mary's	October 12	
21	Sparrow	Ashley Monroe	Warner Bros. Nashville	April 20	
23	They Were There: A Hero's Documentary (soundtrack)	Granger Smith	Wheelhouse Records	November 30	
20	Things Change	American Aquarium	New West Records	June 1	
21	The Throne	Adam Calhoun	Adam Calhoun	November 2	
16	'Til I'm Gone	Frank Foster	Lone Chief	September 21	
39	The Tree	Lori McKenna	CN Records	July 20	
32	The Voice: The Season 15 Collection	Kirk Jay		December 14	
49	The Voice: The Season 15 Collection	Chevel Shepherd		December 14	
14	Volunteer	Old Crow Medicine Show	Columbia Nashville	April 20	
46	Wind (EP)	Sister Hazel	Croakin' Poets	September 7	
20	WW III	Wheeler Walker Jr.	Thirty Tigers	November 30	
34	You Got 'Em All	Trent Harmon	Big Machine Label Group	May 18	

== Deaths ==
- January 2 – Rick Hall, 85, record producer and owner of FAME Studios
- January 23 – Lari White, 52, singer-songwriter and actress best known for the hit "Now I Know" (advanced peritoneal cancer).
- February 12 – Daryle Singletary, 46, neotraditionalist singer-songwriter with hits including "I Let Her Lie", "Amen Kind of Love" and "Too Much Fun". (blood clot)
- February 25 – Bruce Nelson Stratton, 74, American radio personality (throat cancer).
- March 2 – Ronnie Prophet, 80, Canadian country music singer (multiple organ failure).
- March 18 – Hazel Smith, 83, American country music journalist, publicist and songwriter; first to coin the phrase "outlaw" in relation to country music.
- March 27 – Kenny O'Dell, 73, American country singer-songwriter ("Behind Closed Doors", "Lizzie and the Rainman", "Mama He's Crazy"), Grammy winner (1974).
- April 17 – Tom McBride, 81, Irish country star and lead singer of Big Tom and The Mainliners.
- April 18 – Randy Scruggs, 64, multiple Grammy-winning songwriter and guitarist; son of Earl Scruggs.
- June 2 – Wayne Secrest, 68, bassist for Confederate Railroad
- June 5 – Billy ThunderKloud, 70, Native American country music singer. (complications from stroke and pneumonia).
- August 4 – Lorrie Collins, 76, American rockabilly singer, member of The Collins Kids.
- August 11 - Blue Miller, 66, member of Gibson/Miller Band
- October 27 – Freddie Hart, 91, singer-songwriter ("Easy Loving", "My Hang-Up Is You", "Trip to Heaven", "Hang In There Girl") (pneumonia).
- November 1 – Dave Rowland, 74, lead singer of Dave & Sugar (stroke).
- November 15 – Roy Clark, 85, country music singer, musician and host of Hee Haw (complications from pneumonia).
- December 15 – Jerry Chesnut, 87, songwriter ("It's Four in the Morning", "T-R-O-U-B-L-E")
- December 22 – Jimmy Work, 94, American country singer-songwriter ("Making Believe").
- December 31 – Ray Sawyer, 81, American country singer Dr. Hook & the Medicine Show (short illness).

== Hall of Fame inductees ==
=== Bluegrass Hall of Fame ===
- Tom T. Hall and Dixie Hall
- Ricky Skaggs
- Paul Williams

=== Country Music Hall of Fame inductees ===
- Ricky Skaggs, bluegrass-influenced-and-styled singer-songwriter-musician and leading figure in the neotraditionalist movement of the 1980s onward (born 1954).
- Dottie West, leading singer of the 1960s and early 1970s, enjoyed pop-styled resurgence in late 1970s and early 1980s (1932–1991).
- Johnny Gimble, Western swing-styled musician and member of Bob Wills' Texas Playboys (1926–2015).

=== Canadian Country Music Hall of Fame inductees ===
- Terri Clark, singer (born 1968)
- Jackie Rae Greening, broadcaster

== Major awards ==
=== Academy of Country Music ===
(presented in Las Vegas on April 7, 2019)

- Entertainer of the Year – Keith Urban
- Male Vocalist of the Year – Thomas Rhett
- Female Vocalist of the Year – Kacey Musgraves
- Vocal Duo of the Year – Dan + Shay
- Vocal Group of the Year – Old Dominion
- New Male Vocalist of the Year – Luke Combs
- New Female Vocalist of the Year – Ashley McBryde
- New Vocal Duo/Group of the Year – Lanco
- Songwriter of the Year – Shane McAnally
- Album of the Year – Golden Hour (Kacey Musgraves)
- Single of the Year – "Tequila" (Dan + Shay)
- Song of the Year – "Tequila" (Nicolle Galyon, Jordan Reynolds Dan Smyers)
- Vocal Event of the Year – "Burning Man" (Dierks Bentley featuring Brothers Osborne
- Video of the Year – "Drunk Girl" (Chris Janson)
- Artist of the Decade – Jason Aldean

ACM Honors
(presented August 22 in Nashville)

- Cliffie Stone Icon Award – Alan Jackson
- Merle Haggard Spirit Award – Dierks Bentley
- Mae Boren Axton Award – Mickey Christensen, Chris Christensen and Eddie Miller
- Poet's Award – Matraca Berg and Norro Wilson
- Gary Haber Lifting Lives Award – Darius Rucker
- Gene Weed Milestone Award – Sam Hunt
- Songwriter of the Year – Rhett Akins
- Producer of the Year – Dave Cobb
- Jim Reeves International Award – Rob Potts

=== Americana Music Honors & Awards ===
(presented on September 12, 2018)

- Album of the Year – The Nashville Sound (Jason Isbell)
- Artist of the Year – John Prine
- Duo/Group of the Year – Jason Isbell and the 400 Unit
- Song of the Year – "If We Were Vampires" (Jason Isbell)
- Emerging Artist of the Year – Tyler Childers
- Instrumentalist of the Year – Molly Tuttle
- Spirit of Americana/Free Speech Award – Rosanne Cash
- Lifetime Achievement: Trailblazer – k.d. lang
- Lifetime Achievement: Performance – Irma Thomas
- Lifetime Achievement: Instrumentalist – Buddy Guy
- Lifetime Achievement: Executive – Judy Dlugacz and Cris Williamson

=== American Music Awards ===
(presented in Los Angeles on October 9, 2018)

- Favorite Male Artist – Kane Brown
- Favorite Female Artist – Carrie Underwood
- Favorite Group or Duo – Florida Georgia Line
- Favorite Album – Kane Brown (Kane Brown)
- Favorite Song – "Heaven" (Kane Brown)

=== ARIA Awards ===
(presented in Sydney on November 28, 2018)

- Best Country Album – Campfire (Kasey Chambers)
- ARIA Hall of Fame – Kasey Chambers

=== Billboard Music Awards ===
(presented in Las Vegas on May 20, 2018)

- Top Country Artist – Chris Stapleton
- Top Male Country Artist – Chris Stapleton
- Top Female Country Artist – Maren Morris
- Top Country Duo/Group – Florida Georgia Line
- Top Country Album – From A Room: Volume 1 (Chris Stapleton)
- Top Country Song – "Body Like a Back Road" (Zach Crowell, Sam Hunt, Shane McAnally, Josh Osborne)
- Top Country Tour – Huntin', Fishin' and Lovin' Every Day Tour (Luke Bryan)

=== CMT Awards ===
(presented on June 7, 2018, in Nashville)

- Video of the Year – "I'll Name the Dogs" (Blake Shelton)
- Male Video of the Year – "I'll Name the Dogs" (Blake Shelton)
- Female Video of the Year – "The Champion" (Carrie Underwood ft. Ludacris)
- Duo Video of the Year – "Tequila" (Dan + Shay)
- Group Video of the Year – "When Someone Stops Loving You" (Little Big Town)
- Breakthrough Video of the Year – "Every Little Thing" (Carly Pearce)
- Collaborative Video of the Year – "What Ifs" (Kane Brown ft. Lauren Alaina)
- CMT Performance of the Year – "Everybody" (Backstreet Boys and Florida Georgia Line) from CMT Crossroads

CMT Artists of the Year
(presented on October 17, 2019, in Nashville)

- Kelsea Ballerini
- Karen Fairchild
- Miranda Lambert
- Maren Morris
- Kimberley Schlapman
- Hillary Scott
- Carrie Underwood
- Artist of a Lifetime: Shania Twain

=== Country Music Association Awards ===
(presented on November 15, 2018, in Nashville)

- Entertainer of the Year – Keith Urban
- Male Vocalist of the Year – Chris Stapleton
- Female Vocalist of the Year – Carrie Underwood
- New Artist of the Year – Luke Combs
- Vocal Duo of the Year – Brothers Osborne
- Vocal Group of the Year – Old Dominion
- Musician of the Year – Mac McAnally
- Single of the Year – "Broken Halos" (Chris Stapleton)
- Song of the Year – "Broken Halos" (Mike Henderson, Chris Stapleton)
- Album of the Year – Golden Hour (Kacey Musgraves)
- Musical Event of the Year – "Everything's Gonna Be Alright (David Lee Murphy and Kenny Chesney)
- Music Video of the Year – "Marry Me" (Thomas Rhett)
- International Artist Achievement Award – Little Big Town
- Global Artist Achievement Award – Dean Brody (Canada)

=== Grammy Awards ===
(presented in Los Angeles on February 10, 2019)

- Album of the Year – Golden Hour (Kacey Musgraves)
- Best Country Solo Performance – "Butterflies" (Kacey Musgraves)
- Best Country Duo/Group Performance – "Tequila" (Dan + Shay)
- Best Country Song – "Space Cowboy" (Luke Laird, Shane McAnally, Kacey Musgraves)
- Best Country Album – Golden Hour (Kacey Musgraves)
- Best Bluegrass Album – The Travelin' McCourys (The Travelin' McCourys)
- Best Americana Album – By the Way, I Forgive You (Brandi Carlile)
- Best American Roots Performance – "The Joke" (Brandi Carlile)
- Best American Roots Song – "The Joke" (Brandi Carlile, Dave Cobb, Phil Hanseroth, Tim Hanseroth)
- Best Roots Gospel Album – Unexpected (Jason Crabb)

=== International Bluegrass Music Association Awards ===
(presented on September 27, 2018)

- Entertainer of the Year – Balsam Range
- Male Vocalist of the Year – Buddy Melton
- Female Vocalist of the Year – Brooke Aldridge
- Vocal Group of the Year – Doyle Lawson & Quicksilver
- Instrumental Group of the Year – The Travelin' McCourys
- Emerging Artist of the Year – The Po' Ramblin' Boys
- Guitar Player of the Year – Molly Tuttle
- Banjo Player of the Year – Ned Luberecki
- Mandolin Player of the Year – Sierra Hull
- Fiddle Player of the Year – Michael Cleveland
- Bass Player of the Year – Tim Surrett
- Dobro Player of the Year – Justin Moses
- Album of the Year – Rivers & Roads (The Special Consensus)
- Song of the Year – "If I'd Have Wrote That Song" (Larry Cordle, Larry Shell, James Silvers)
- Recorded Event of the Year – "Swept Away" (Missy Raines with Alison Brown, Becky Buller, Sierra Hull and Molly Tuttle)
- Instrumental Recorded Performance of the Year – "Squirrel Hunters" (The Special Consensus with John Hartford, Rachel Baiman, Christian Sedelmyer and Alison Brown)
- Gospel Recorded Performance of the Year – "Speakin' To That Mountain" (Becky Buller)

=== Juno Awards ===
(presented in London on March 16–17, 2019)

- Country Album of the Year – We Were That Song (Brett Kissel)
- Contemporary Roots Album of the Year – Both Ways (Donovan Woods)
- Traditional Roots Album of the Year – Sweet Old Religion (Pharis and Jason Romero)
- Breakthrough Group of the Year – The Washboard Union
- Recording Engineer of the Year – Shawn Everett (Golden Hour)

=== Hollywood walk of Fame ===
Stars who were honored in 2018

Carrie Underwood

=== Kennedy Center Honors ===
Country stars who were honored in 2018

Reba McEntire

== See also ==
- Country Music Association
- Inductees of the Country Music Hall of Fame
