= Super Grit Cowboy Band =

- Origin: North Carolina, U.S.
- Genres: Country rock, southern rock, bluegrass
- Years active: 1975-present
- Labels: Sound Hut, Hoodswamp
- Members: Mark Golladay; Dexter Horton; Mike Kinzie; Clyde Mattocks; Carroll Wade
- Past members: Alan M Hicks; Bill Lyerly; Don Cox; Bill Ellis; Danny Vinson; Cliff Swanhart; Jason D. Smith; Bill Norton; Curtis Wright

Super Grit Cowboy Band is an American country music band formed in North Carolina. It was founded by Clyde Mattocks, Libby Mattocks, Bill Lyerly, Danny Vinson, Dave Cavanaugh and Alfred Ward. Active since 1974, the band recorded first with Sound Hut Studios. Beginning with their 1981 album, the band has recorded on its own Hoodswamp label.

== History ==
The band formed in 1974, comprising Clyde Mattocks (steel guitar, Dobro, banjo, electric guitar), Danny Vinson (drums), Mike Kinzie (fiddle, saxophone, piano, harmonica, acoustic guitar), Bill Ellis (bass guitar, keyboards) and Curtis Wright (lead guitar).

The band recorded their first album in 1977 featuring Bill Lyerly (Bill Lyerly Band). Later the band recorded for its own label, Hoodswamp Records, and released three albums on it. In 1981, the band charted for the first time on Hot Country Songs with "If You Don't Know Me by Now," which reached No. 71. Between then and 1983, four more of the band's singles reached the country charts, including its highest-charting, the No. 48 "She Is the Woman." Billboard gave the band's 1981 album If You Can't Hang a positive review, praising the instrumentation as well as the rock influences.

At one point, Don Cox was a member of the band. He later recorded All Over Town for Step One Records and charted at No. 53 on the country music charts with its title track. Wright later joined Vern Gosdin's road band, of which he was a member until 1989. After quitting that band, Wright was a solo artist for Airborne and Liberty Records, charting in the Top 40 with "She's Got a Man on Her Mind" in 1990 and releasing a self-titled album in 1992. He later recorded one album with Robert Ellis Orrall in the duo Orrall & Wright, then joined Shenandoah from 2000 to 2008. Wright has also written singles for Shenandoah, Ronnie Milsap, Daryle Singletary, and Carolina Rain.

Since 2010, the band has consisted of Mattocks and Kinzie, along with guitarist Mark Golladay, drummer Dexter Horton and bass guitarist Carroll Wade.

== Discography ==
=== Albums ===
Year	Album information
1977	Super Grit Cowboy Band: Label: Sound Hut
1981	If You Can't Hang...Drag Your Country Ass Home: Label: Hoodswamp
1983	Showin' Our Class: Label: Hoodswamp
1986	This Way To The Stage: Label: Hoodswamp

=== Singles ===
Year	Single	Chart Positions
Year	Single	US Country
1981	"If You Don't Know Me by Now"	71
1981	"Carolina by the Sea"	64
1982	"Semi Diesel Blues"	83
1982	"She Is the Woman"	48
1983	"I Bought the Shoes (That Just Walked Out on Me)"	79
