= Curtis Wright (1992 album) =

Studio album by Curtis Wright
- Released: July 14, 1992
- Genre: Country
- Length: 31:39
- Label: Liberty
- Producer: Lynn Peterzell; James Stroud

Curtis Wright chronology
Curtis Wright (1992)	Curtis Wright (2016)

Singles from Curtis Wright
- 1. "Hometown Radio" Released: June 1992; 2. "If I Could Stop Lovin' You" Released: December 1992

Curtis Wright is the self-titled debut studio album by American country music singer-songwriter Curtis Wright. It was released on July 14, 1992, by Liberty Records.

"What's It to You" and "I Don't Know How Love Starts" were both later recorded by Clay Walker on his 1993 self-titled debut album. The former would be released as his first single and first number one, and the latter was co-written by Rich Alves of Pirates of the Mississippi.

"Phonographic Memory" and "If I Ever Love Again" were later recorded by Daron Norwood on his 1994 self-titled debut album and the latter would be released as a single and peak at number 48 on the Billboard Hot Country Songs chart. Dude Mowrey previously recorded "If I Ever Love Again" for his 1991 debut album Honky Tonk.

"If I Could Stop Lovin' You" was later recorded by country and bluegrass singer Rhonda Vincent for her 1996 album Trouble Free.

== Critical reception ==
Billboard gave the album a review calling Curtis Wright "a soulful vocalist and a keen-eyed and sensitive writer."

== Track listing ==
No.	Title	Writer(s)	Length
1.	"What's It to You"	Curtis Wright, Robert Ellis Orrall	2:47
2.	"Phonographic Memory"	Wright, Orrall, Doug Millet	2:29
3.	"If I Ever Love Again"	Wright, Billy Spencer	3:53
4.	"I Can't Stand to Watch My Old Flame Burn"	Wright, T.J. Knight	3:02
5.	"I Don't Know How Love Starts"	Wright, Knight, Rich Alves	3:40
6.	"If I Could Stop Lovin' You"	Wright, Orrall, Spencer	2:23
7.	"If You Don't Love Me"	Wright	3:05
8.	"Talk to Me, Heart"	Wright	3:45
9.	"I Tripped Over Your Memory"	Wright, Curt Ryle, Mike Baker	2:50
10.	"Hometown Radio"	Vernon Rust	3:45

== Personnel ==
Compiled from liner notes.

- Mike Baker – acoustic guitar
- Bill Cook – bass guitar
- Larry Franklin – fiddle
- Sonny Garrish – steel guitar
- Steve Gibson – electric guitar
- Vince Gill – background vocals
- Rob Hajacos – fiddle
- Jana King – background vocals
- Chris Leuzinger – electric guitar
- Randy McCormick – piano
- Roger McVay – bass guitar
- Tony Piro – drums
- Gary Prim – piano
- Brent Rowan – electric guitar, acoustic guitar
- Curt Ryle – acoustic guitar, steel guitar
- James Stroud – drums
- Curtis Wright – vocals, acoustic guitar
- Curtis Young – background vocals

Technical

- Julian King – recording
- Glenn Meadows – mastering
- Lynn Peterzell – production, recording, mixing
- James Stroud – production
