= You Still Got Me (Doug Supernaw album) =

Studio album by Doug Supernaw
- Released: October 24, 1995
- Genre: Country
- Length: 38:14
- Label: Giant
- Producer: Richard Landis

Doug Supernaw chronology
Deep Thoughts from a Shallow Mind (1994)	You Still Got Me (1995)	The Encore Collection (1997)

You Still Got Me is the third studio album by American country music artist Doug Supernaw. Released on October 24, 1995, by Giant Records the album produced the single "Not Enough Hours in the Night", a Top 5 hit for Supernaw on the Hot Country Songs charts in 1996. The track "Roots and Wings" later served as the title track to James Bonamy's 1997 album Roots and Wings, while "The Note" was released in 1998 as a single by Daryle Singletary on his album Ain't It the Truth.

== Track listing ==
No.	Title	Writer(s)	Length
1.	"Not Enough Hours in the Night"	Aaron Barker; Kim Williams; Ron Harbin	3:11
2.	"She Never Looks Back"	Jim Lauderdale; Frank Dycus	2:28
3.	"You Still Got Me"	Doug Supernaw; Kenny King	4:13
4.	"Country Conscience"	Roger Murrah; Keith Stegall; Michael White	2:39
5.	"Daddy Made the Dollars (Mamma Made the Sense)"	Gene Robbins; Bobby Taylor; John Ramey	3:28
6.	"Roots and Wings"	Skip Ewing; Bill Anderson	4:45
7.	"We're All Here"	Supernaw; King; Allen Huff; Justin White IV; Don Crider	3:32
8.	"A Fire in the Rain"	Rick Giles; Amanda Hunt Taylor	3:57
9.	"Time Off from Good Behavior"	Roger Springer; Tony Martin; Reese Wilson	2:24
10.	"The Note"	Buck Moore; Michele Rae	3:37
11.	"What in the World"	Supernaw; King; Huff; Crider; White; Joe DeLeon; Tim Buckley	4:00

== Personnel ==
- Acoustic Guitar - Billy Joe Walker, Jr., Skip Ewing
- Background Vocals - Doug Supernaw, Curtis Young, Curtis Wright
- Bass guitar - Glenn Worf, David Hungate
- Drums - Paul Leim
- Electric guitar - Brent Mason, Dann Huff
- Fiddle - Stuart Duncan, Glen Duncan
- Keyboards - Carl Marsh
- Lead Vocals - Doug Supernaw
- Percussion - Terry McMillan
- Piano - Mitch Humphries, Hargus "Pig" Robbins
- Steel Guitar - Paul Franklin, Sonny Garrish
- Strings - Nashville String Machine

== Chart performance ==
=== Album ===
Chart (1996)	Peak position
U.S. Billboard Top Country Albums	42
U.S. Billboard Top Heatseekers	19
Canadian RPM Country Albums	31

=== Singles ===
Year	Single	Peak positions	
Year	Single	US Country	CAN Country
1995	"Not Enough Hours in the Night"	3	4
1996	"She Never Looks Back"	51	—
1996	"You Still Got Me"	53	69
