= That's Why I Sing This Way =

Studio album by Daryle Singletary
- Released: April 23, 2002
- Genre: Country
- Label: Audium/Koch
- Producer: Gregory Cole

Daryle Singletary chronology
Now and Again (2000)	That's Why I Sing This Way (2002)	Straight from the Heart (2007)

Professional ratings
Review scores
Source	Rating
About.com	Favorable link
Allmusic	link
Country Standard Time	Favorable link

That's Why I Sing This Way is the fourth studio album by American country music singer Daryle Singletary. It was released on April 23, 2002 via Koch Records. Except for its title track, the album is composed of cover songs. Two singles were released from it: the title track and a cover of Conway Twitty's 1980 Number One single "I'd Love to Lay You Down", which respectively reached #47 and #43 on the U.S. Billboard country singles charts. The version of "I Never Go Around Mirrors" on this album was first recorded by Keith Whitley, Whitley had Shafer write the second verse heard here. The album includes guest appearances from George Jones, Dwight Yoakam, Rhonda Vincent, John Wesley Ryles, Merle Haggard and Johnny Paycheck.

== Track listing ==
No.	Title	Writer(s)	Original Artist	Length
1.	"Love's Gonna Live Here" (with Dwight Yoakam)	Buck Owens	Buck Owens	2:44
2.	"Walk Through This World with Me" (with George Jones)	Kaye Savage, Sandra Seamons	George Jones	2:32
3.	"I'd Love to Lay You Down"	Johnny MacRae	Conway Twitty	3:09
4.	"A-11"	Hank Cochran	Johnny Paycheck	2:40
5.	"Long Black Veil"	Marijohn Wilkin, Danny Dill	Lefty Frizzell	3:23
6.	"Kay" (with John Wesley Ryles)	Hank Mills	John Wesley Ryles	3:34
7.	"That's Why I Sing This Way"	Max D. Barnes	Daryle Singletary	2:56
8.	"I Never Go Around Mirrors (I've Got a Heartache to Hide)"	Lefty Frizzell, Sanger D. Shafer	Lefty Frizzell	4:30
9.	"Dim Lights, Thick Smoke (And Loud, Loud Music)"	Max M. Fidler, Joe Maphis, Rose Lee Maphis	Joe Maphis and Rose Lee	3:58
10.	"Makeup and Faded Blue Jeans" (with Merle Haggard)	Merle Haggard	Merle Haggard	3:45
11.	"After the Fire Is Gone" (with Rhonda Vincent)	L. E. White	Conway Twitty and Loretta Lynn	2:51
12.	"Old Violin" (with Johnny Paycheck)	Johnny Paycheck	Johnny Paycheck	3:29

== Personnel ==
- Joe Caverlee - fiddle, mandolin
- Gregory Cole - background vocals
- Merle Haggard - vocals on "Makeup and Faded Blue Jeans"
- George Jones - vocals on "Walk Through This World with Me"
- Paul Leim - drums
- Terry McMillan - harmonica
- Brent Mason - electric guitar
- Mike Johnson - pedal steel guitar
- Danny Parks - acoustic guitar, electric guitar
- Johnny Paycheck - vocals on "Old Violin"
- John Wesley Ryles - vocals on "Kay"
- Daryle Singletary - lead vocals
- Catherine Styron - piano
- Darrin Vincent - background vocals
- Rhonda Vincent - vocals on "After the Fire Is Gone"
- Glenn Worf - bass guitar
- Dwight Yoakam - vocals on "Love's Gonna Live Here"

== Chart performance ==
Chart (2002)	Peak position
U.S. Billboard Top Country Albums	65
