= Ain't It the Truth =

Studio album by Daryle Singletary
- Released: February 24, 1998
- Recorded: 1997
- Genre: Country
- Length: 34:08
- Label: Giant
- Producers: John Hobbs, Doug Johnson

Daryle Singletary chronology
All Because of You (1996)	Ain't It the Truth (1998)	Now and Again (2000)

Professional ratings
Review scores
Source	Rating
AllMusic	4/5 stars
Country Standard Time	favorable
Entertainment Weekly	B−

Ain't It the Truth is the third studio album by American country music singer Daryle Singletary. It was released in 1998 via Giant Records. It was led off by the single "The Note" (previously recorded by Doug Supernaw on 1995's You Still Got Me), which peaked at #28 on the country singles charts that year. The next two singles, "That's Where You're Wrong" and "My Baby's Lovin'" both missed Top 40, and by the end of the year, Singletary exited the label's roster. "A Thing Called Love" was originally released by Jimmy Dean. "The Note" was also Singletary's only entry on the Billboard Hot 100 chart, peaking at #90.

== Track listing ==
No.	Title	Writer(s)	Length
1.	"The Note"	Buck Moore, Michele Rae	3:22
2.	"Love or the Lack Of"	Mary Ann Kennedy, Rich Wayland	3:52
3.	"That's Where You're Wrong"	Jeff Crossan	3:29
4.	"A Thing Called Love"	Jerry Reed	2:41
5.	"I'd Live for You"	DeWayne Blackwell	2:40
6.	"Miracle in the Making" (duet with Kerry Singletary)	Joe Doyle, Josh Kear	3:24
7.	"My Baby's Lovin'"	Michael Lunn, Delbert McClinton	3:53
8.	"You Ain't Heard Nothin' Yet"	Tony Haselden, Tim Mensy	4:10
9.	"The Real Deal"	Daryle Singletary, Robert Arthur, Roger Springer	2:38
10.	"Ain't It the Truth"	Singletary, Doug Johnson, John Hobbs	3:59

== Personnel ==
- Larry Byrom - acoustic guitar, electric guitar
- Joe Chemay - bass guitar
- Larry Franklin - fiddle
- Paul Franklin - dobro, steel guitar
- Sonny Garrish - steel guitar
- Steve Gibson - acoustic guitar, electric guitar, mandolin
- John Hobbs - keyboards, synthesizer
- Dann Huff - bass guitar, electric guitar
- Paul Leim - drums, percussion
- Liana Manis - background vocals
- Brent Rowan - electric guitar
- John Wesley Ryles - background vocals
- Daryle Singletary - lead vocals
- Kerry Singletary - background vocals
- Biff Watson - acoustic guitar
- Dennis Wilson - background vocals
- Lonnie Wilson - drums
- Glenn Worf - bass guitar

== Chart performance ==
Chart (1998)	Peak position
U.S. Billboard Top Country Albums	18
U.S. Billboard 200	160
U.S. Billboard Top Heatseekers	7
