= Trying to Be Me =

Trying to Be Me may refer to:

- Trying to Be Me (album), 2008 album by Laura Bryna
- "Trying to Be Me" (song), 2000 song by Sweetbox
