= Daryle Singletary (album) =

Studio album by Daryle Singletary
- Released: May 23, 1995
- Recorded: 1994–1995 at Sound Stage Studio and Loud Recording - Nashville, Tennessee
- Genre: Neotraditional country; honky-tonk
- Length: 32:00
- Label: Giant
- Producer: James Stroud, Randy Travis, David Malloy

Daryle Singletary chronology
Daryle Singletary (1995)	All Because of You (1996)

Singles from Daryle Singletary
- 1. "I'm Living Up to Her Low Expectations" Released: March 1995; 2. "I Let Her Lie" Released: July 17, 1995; 3. "Too Much Fun" Released: November 27, 1995; 4. "Workin' It Out" Released: April 1996

Daryle Singletary is the debut studio album by American country music singer Daryle Singletary. It was released in 1995 (see 1995 in country music) via Giant Records Nashville. The album includes four singles: "I'm Living Up to Her Low Expectations", "I Let Her Lie", "Too Much Fun" and "Workin' It Out", all of which charted on the Billboard country singles charts between 1995 and 1996. Although "I Let Her Lie" and "Too Much Fun" were both Top 5 country hits, the album only peaked at #44 on Top Country Albums.

The track "My Heart's Too Broke (To Pay Attention)" was previously recorded by Mark Chesnutt on his 1993 album Almost Goodbye.

== Musical style and composition ==
Daryle Singletary has been described a neotraditional country and honky-tonk album.

== Critical reception ==
Alanna Nash of Entertainment Weekly gave the album a B+ rating, saying that Singletary "mines familiar honky-tonk sources on this stylish debut, but he has a terrific presence and a knack for inhabiting a lyric."

== Track listing ==
No.	Title	Writer(s)	Length
1.	"Too Much Fun"	Curtis Wright, T.J. Knight	2:45
2.	"I'm Living Up to Her Low Expectations"	Bob McDill, Tommy Rocco	3:08
3.	"There's a Cold Spell Moving In"	Randy Travis, Jerry Foster, Ron Avis	3:22
4.	"Ordinary Heroes"	Tim Johnson, Alex Call	3:09
5.	"I Let Her Lie"	Johnson	2:58
6.	"A Love That Never Died"	Skip Ewing, Donny Kees	3:46
7.	"Workin' It Out"	Johnson, Brett Jones	3:05
8.	"My Heart's Too Broke (To Pay Attention)"	Phil Barnhart, Kim Williams, Lonnie Wilson	2:43
9.	"Would These Arms Be in Your Way"	Hank Cochran, Vern Gosdin, Red Lane	3:08
10.	"What Am I Doing There"	Buddy Brock, Zack Turner	3:49

== Personnel ==
As listed in liner notes.

- Larry Byrom – acoustic guitar
- Mark Casstevens – acoustic guitar
- Paul Franklin – steel guitar
- Sonny Garrish – steel guitar
- Rob Hajacos – fiddle
- Dann Huff – electric guitar
- Paul Leim – drums
- Brent Mason – electric guitar, acoustic guitar
- Terry McMillan – harmonica
- Jimmy Nichols – organ on "I Let Her Lie"
- Hargus "Pig" Robbins – piano
- Matt Rollings – piano
- Daryle Singletary – lead vocals
- Rhonda Vincent – background vocals on "Would These Arms Be in Your Way"
- Glenn Worf – bass guitar
- Curtis Wright – background vocals
- Curtis Young – background vocals

== Chart performance ==
Chart (1995)	Peak position
U.S. Billboard Top Country Albums	44
U.S. Billboard Top Heatseekers	27
