= Now and Again (disambiguation) =

Now and Again is a 1999–2000 American television series.

Now and Again may also refer to:

- Now and Again (Daryle Singletary album)
- Now and Again (The Grapes of Wrath album)
