= Straight from the Heart (Daryle Singletary album) =

Studio album by Daryle Singletary
- Released: February 27, 2007
- Genre: Country
- Label: Shanachie
- Producer: Gregory Cole, Chuck Rhodes

Daryle Singletary chronology
That's Why I Sing This Way (2002)	Straight from the Heart (2007)	Rockin' in the Country (2009)

Professional ratings
Review scores
Source	Rating
Allmusic	3/5 stars
Country Standard Time	(favorable)

Straight from the Heart is the fifth studio album by American country music singer Daryle Singletary. It was released on February 27, 2007, via Shanachie Records. Like his last album, 2002's That's Why I Sing This Way, this album is largely composed of cover songs, save for "I Still Sing This Way", which is an original song. It and "Jesus & Bartenders" were both released as singles from this album, although both failed to chart. As with his last covers album, this one includes several guest appearances.

== Track listing ==
No.	Title	Writer(s)	Original artist(s)	Length
1.	"The Bottle Let Me Down"	Merle Haggard	Merle Haggard	2:51
2.	"Black Sheep" (with John Anderson)	Robert Altman, Daniel Darst	John Anderson	3:25
3.	"Some Broken Hearts Never Mend"	Wayland Holyfield	Don Williams	3:08
4.	"Promises"	Randy Travis, John Lindley	Randy Travis	3:58
5.	"I've Got a Tiger by the Tail" (with Ricky Skaggs)	Harlan Howard, Buck Owens	Buck Owens	2:33
6.	"Jesus and Bartenders"	Larry Cordle, Leslie Satcher	Larry Cordle	3:29
7.	"These Days I Barely Get By"	George Jones, Tammy Wynette	George Jones	3:03
8.	"Miami, My Amy"	Hank Cochran, Dean Dillon, Royce Porter	Keith Whitley	3:35
9.	"I Still Sing This Way"	Chris DuBois, David Lee, Daryle Singletary	Daryle Singletary	3:27
10.	"Lovin' on Back Streets"	Hugh King	Mel Street	3:02
11.	"Fifteen Years Ago"	Ray Smith	Conway Twitty	3:40
12.	"We're Gonna Hold On" (with Rhonda Vincent)	Jones, Earl Montgomery	George Jones and Tammy Wynette	2:55

== Personnel ==
- John Anderson - vocals on "Black Sheep"
- Joe Caverlee - fiddle
- Shannon Forrest - drums
- Aubrey Haynie - fiddle
- Mike Johnson - steel guitar
- Catherine Styron Marx - piano
- Brent Mason - electric guitar
- Duncan Mullins - bass guitar
- Danny Parks - electric guitar
- Hargus "Pig" Robbins - piano
- Daryle Singletary - lead vocals
- Ricky Skaggs - vocals on "I've Got a Tiger by the Tail"
- Bryan Sutton - acoustic guitar
- Darrin Vincent - background vocals
- Rhonda Vincent - vocals on "We"re Gonna Hold On"

== Chart performance ==
Chart (2007)	Peak position
U.S. Billboard Top Country Albums	74
