= They've Been Talkin' About Me =

Studio album by Jeff Knight
- Released: April 21, 1992
- Genre: Country
- Length: 29:50
- Label: Polygram/Mercury
- Producer: Bud Logan; Harold Shedd

Jeff Knight chronology
They've Been Talkin' About Me (1992)	Easy Street (1993)

Singles from They've Been Talkin' About Me
- 1. "They've Been Talkin' About Me" Released: March 1992; 2. "I Wish She Didn't Know Me" Released: May 1992; 3. "Someone Like You" Released: September 1992

They've Been Talkin' About Me is the debut studio album by American country music singer-songwriter Jeff Knight. It was released on April 21, 1992, via Polygram/Mercury Records.

"Tearing Down Walls", "You Gotta Let Go", "The Bitter End" and "Someone Like You" were all co-written by Rich Alves of Pirates of the Mississippi.

== Critical reception ==
Jason Ankeny of AllMusic gave a review stating "Knight's debut spotlights his soulful readings of ballads."

== Track listing ==
All tracks written or co-written by Jeff Knight. Co-writers are named in parentheses.

No.	Title	Writer(s)	Length
1.	"Tearing Down Walls"	Rich Alves, Jerry Taylor	3:43
2.	"You Gotta Let Go"	Alves, Taylor	3:02
3.	"They've Been Talkin' About Me"		3:15
4.	"I Wish She Didn't Know Me"		3:25
5.	"All I Think About Is You"		2:44
6.	"The Bitter End"	Alves, Taylor	2:44
7.	"I Got Through Everything (But the Door)"	Charlie Williams	3:22
8.	"Someone Like You"	Alves, Taylor	2:31
9.	"Gettin' In to Goin' Out"	Curtis Wright	2:54
10.	"Everybody's Doin' It"		2:10

== Personnel ==
Compiled from liner notes.

- Michael Black – background vocals
- Dennis Burnside – piano
- Buddy Cannon – background vocals
- Jimmy Capps – acoustic guitar
- Michael Chapman – bass
- Paul Franklin – steel guitar
- Sonny Garrish – steel guitar
- Rob Hajacos – fiddle
- Ted Hewitt – background vocals
- Keith Hinton – electric guitar
- Jeff Knight – lead vocals, background vocals
- Jerry Kroon – drums
- Chris Leuzinger – electric guitar
- Steven Nathan – keyboards
- The Polygram Singers – background vocals (track 9)
- Gary Prim – keyboards
- Tom Robb – bass
- Brent Rowan – electric guitar
- Milton Sledge – drums
- John Willis – acoustic guitar
- Dennis Wilson – background vocals
- Bob Wray – bass
- Curtis Wright – background vocals (track 9)
- Curtis Young – background vocals
