= Rockin' in the Country =

Studio album by Daryle Singletary
- Released: June 9, 2009
- Genre: Country
- Label: E1 Music
- Producer: Greg Cole, Chuck Rhodes

Daryle Singletary chronology
Straight from the Heart (2007)	Rockin' in the Country (2009)	There's Still a Little Country Left (2015)

Professional ratings
Review scores
Source	Rating
Allmusic	link
Country Weekly	July 13, 2009, p. 51
Country Standard Time	Favorable link

Rockin' in the Country is the sixth studio album by American country music singer Daryle Singletary. It was released June 9, 2009 via E1 Music. The album includes the non-charting single "Love You with the Lights On", as well as two cover versions: "How Can I Believe in You", previously recorded by Vern Gosdin on his 1984 album There Is a Season, and "Take Me Home, Country Roads", originally recorded by John Denver.

== Track listing ==
1. "Rockin' in the Country" (Paul Overstreet, Sonny Tillis) – 3:47
  - duet with Charlie Daniels
2. "Love You with the Lights On" (Christopher Dubois, David Cory Lee) – 3:51
3. "That's Why God Made Me" (Harley Allen, Jimmy Melton) – 4:04
4. "How Can I Believe in You (When You'll Be Leaving Me)" (Buddy Cannon, Vern Gosdin) – 3:21
5. "Going Through Hell (With You Again)" (Don Poythress, Wynn Varble, Jimmy Wayne) – 3:17
6. "Background Noise" (Marc Beeson, Jim Collins, Curtis Wright) – 3:46
7. "If I Ever Get Her Back" (Billy Lawson, Billy Yates) – 3:01
8. "Real Estate Hands" (Lawson, Terry Skinner) – 4:23
9. "She's a Woman" (Lawson, Daryle Singletary) – 3:56
10. "She Sure Looks Good in Black" (Lawson, Dale Dodson) – 5:41
11. "They Know How to Grow 'em" (Lawson, Ed Hill) – 2:33
12. "Take Me Home, Country Roads" (John Denver, Bill Danoff, Taffy Nivert) – 3:07
