= Orrall & Wright =

American country music duo

- Origin: United States
- Genre: Country
- Years active: 1994-1995
- Label: Giant
- Past members: Robert Ellis Orrall; Curtis Wright

Orrall & Wright was an American country music duo composed of Robert Ellis Orrall and Curtis Wright. Both members had recorded solo albums and had charted singles of their own prior to Orrall & Wright's inception. As Orrall & Wright, they charted two more singles and recorded a self-titled album on the Giant label. Of the album, Billboard reviewed it, saying that their "confectionery country/pop mix seems custom-made for today's hybrid playlists."

Unlike most other country music duos present at the time, Orrall & Wright's members shared lead vocals on every song that they recorded. Although active for only one year, they received a Duo of the Year nomination from the Country Music Association. By the end of 1994, both members resumed their solo careers. Wright joined the band Shenandoah, in which he served as lead singer until being replaced with Jimmy Yeary in 2007. After leaving Shenandoah, he joined Pure Prairie League. Orrall, meanwhile, has continued a solo career.

== Discography ==
=== Albums ===
Front cover of the album

Orrall & Wright is their self-titled studio album. It was released on July 12, 1994, via Giant Records (24561). Billboard gave the album a review saying the duo's "confectionery country/pop mix seems custom-made for today's hybrid playlists." The album produced 3 singles, two of which hit the Billboard Hot Country Singles chart. It is the only album released by the duo before they disbanded the following year.

No.	Title	Writer(s)	Length
1.	"She Loves Me Like She Means It"	Angelo, Robert Ellis Orrall, Billy Spencer	2:44
2.	"The Last Time I Loved Like That"	Curtis Wright, Orrall	3:50
3.	"I'm Outta Here"	T. J. Knight, Wright	3:21
4.	"Fall Reaching"	Josh Leo, Orrall	3:31
5.	"What Do You Want from Me"	Orrall, Wright	3:01
6.	"Go West Young Man"	Orrall, Wright, Spencer	3:22
7.	"You Saved Me"	Wright	3:03
8.	"Pound, Pound, Pound"	Dale Jarvis, Orrall	3:11
9.	"If You Could Say What I'm Thinking"	Orrall, Wright	3:43
10.	"I'll Tell You When I Get There"	Petraglia, Orrall, Wright	2:43

Overall length: 32:29

==== Personnel ====
Robert Ellis Orrall and Curtis Wright both performed vocals; Orrall also played keyboards and Wright electric guitar.

The additional musicians were Eddie Bayers (drums), Mike Brignardello (bass guitar), Larry Byrom (acoustic guitar), Bill Cuomo (keyboards), Dan Dugmore (steel guitar), Stuart Duncan (fiddle), Sonny Garrish (steel guitar), and Dann Huff (electric guitar).

The technical staff were Marc Frigo (mixing assistant), Mark Hagen (mixing assistant), Julian King (recording, mixing assistant), Robert Ellis Orrall (production), Lynn Peterzell (production, recording, mixing), Denny Purcell (mastering), James Stroud (executive production), Craig White (recording), and Curtis Wright (production).

=== Singles ===
Year	Single	Peak chart positions		Album
Year	Single	US Country	CAN Country	Album
1994	"She Loves Me Like She Means It"	47	39	Orrall & Wright
1994	"If You Could Say What I'm Thinking"	70	68	Orrall & Wright
1995	"What Do You Want from Me"	—	—	Orrall & Wright
"—" denotes releases that did not chart

=== Music videos ===
Year	Video	Director
1994	"She Loves Me Like She Means It"	Roger Pistole
1994	"If You Could Say What I'm Thinking"	Jeff Smith

== Awards and nominations ==
Year	Organization	Award	Nominee/Work	Result
1994	Country Music Association Awards	Vocal Duo of the Year	Orrall & Wright	Nominated
