= Kay (song) =

1968 song by John Wesley Ryles

Single by John Wesley Ryles

from the album Kay
- B-side: "Come On Home" (1968 version); "Next Time" (re-release)
- Released: 1968
- Genre: Country
- Length: 3:41
- Label: Columbia (1968); Dot (1978)
- Songwriter: Hank Mills
- Producer: George Richey (1968); Johnny Morris (1978)

John Wesley Ryles singles chronology
"Kay" (1968)	"Heaven Below" (1969)

"Kay" is a song written by Hank Mills and recorded by American country music artist John Wesley Ryles. It was released in late 1968 by Columbia Records as Ryles' debut single. "Kay," recorded and released while Ryles was still a teenager, began a string of country music hits for him that would continue into the 1980s.

== Content ==
"Kay" is about a taxicab driver in Nashville, Tennessee. He sold everything he owned to bring the woman he has loved and been with for years from Houston to Nashville, where she is becoming a star and moving beyond needing him. It is a song full of feelings and sadness. The song describes some of the people that he carries. Among them are soldiers from Fort Campbell who tell him that they "hate that war in Vietnam". This line has been cited as an example of the anti-war movement's presence in country music in the late 1960s.

== Chart performance ==
Ryles' original version of "Kay" spent 17 weeks on the Hot Country Songs charts, peaking at number 9. It also reached number 83 on the Billboard Hot 100. Ryles re-recorded it for ABC Records in 1978, including this version on his album Shine on Me.

=== Original version ===
Chart (1968–69)	Peak position
U.S. Billboard Hot Country Singles	9
U.S. Billboard Hot 100	83
Canadian RPM Country Tracks	6
Canadian RPM Top Singles	88

=== Re-release ===
Chart (1978)	Peak position
U.S. Billboard Hot Country Singles	50
Canadian RPM Country Tracks	55

== Other versions ==
Daryle Singletary covered the song as a duet with Ryles on his 2002 album That's Why I Sing This Way.

== See also ==
- List of anti-war songs
