= All Because of You (Daryle Singletary album) =

Studio album by Daryle Singletary
- Released: October 8, 1996
- Recorded: 1995–6 at Sound Stage and Loud Recording, Nashville, TN
- Genre: Neotraditional country
- Length: 30:21
- Label: Giant
- Producer: David Malloy and James Stroud

Daryle Singletary chronology
Daryle Singletary (1995)	All Because of You (1996)	Ain't It the Truth (1998)

Singles from All Because of You
- 1. "Amen Kind of Love" Released: October 1, 1996; 2. "The Used to Be's" Released: March 1997; 3. "Even the Wind" Released: 1997

Professional ratings
Review scores
Source	Rating
AllMusic	4/5 stars
Country Standard Time	favorable

All Because of You is the second studio album by American country music singer Daryle Singletary. It was released on October 8, 1996, via Giant Records. Although its lead-off single "Amen Kind of Love" reached #2 on the U.S. country singles charts, the next two singles ("The Used to Be's" and "Even the Wind") both missed Top 40. The album was produced by David Malloy and James Stroud, who also produced Singletary's 1995 self-titled debut.

== Musical style ==
All Because of You has been described as a neotraditional country album, with Singletary's vocal performances compared to traditional country musician Merle Haggard.

== Track listing ==
No.	Title	Writer(s)	Length
1.	"The Used to Be's"	Donny Kees, Michael Huffman, Bob Morrison	2:24
2.	"Amen Kind of Love"	Trey Bruce, Wayne Tester	3:27
4.	"My Heart Population You"	Max T. Barnes	3:19
5.	"Hurts Don't It"	Bruce, Roger Springer	3:15
6.	"Liar Liar My Heart's on Fire"	Springer, Robert Arthur, Tim Mensy	2:53
7.	"Even the Wind"	Hank Cochran, Tim Johnson	3:40
8.	"All Because of You"	Billy Henderson, Steven Dale Jones	3:02
9.	"Redneckin'"	Ron Harbin, Daryle Singletary, Kim Williams	2:09
10.	"He'll Heal My Broken Heart"	Mensy, Springer	3:04
11.	"That's What I Get for Thinkin'"	Harbin, Singletary, Williams	3:14

== Personnel ==
Adapted from liner notes.

=== Musicians ===
- Kathy Burdick – background vocals
- Larry Byrom – electric guitar, acoustic guitar
- Paul Franklin – steel guitar
- Dann Huff – electric guitar, acoustic guitar
- Paul Leim – drums
- Brent Mason – electric guitar
- Jimmy Nichols – keyboards, background vocals
- Steve Nathan – keyboards
- Michael Rhodes – bass guitar
- Hargus "Pig" Robbins – piano
- Matt Rollings – keyboards
- Daryle Singletary – lead vocals
- Joe Spivey – fiddle
- Lonnie Wilson – drums
- Glenn Worf – bass guitar
- Curtis Wright – background vocals
- Curtis Young – background vocals

== Chart performance ==
Chart (1996)	Peak position
U.S. Billboard Top Country Albums	60
