= Heart over Mind (Tammy Wynette album) =

Heart Over Mind

Studio album by Tammy Wynette
- Released: September 3, 1990
- Recorded: May 1990
- Studios: The Bennett House (Franklin, Tennessee); Omni Sound (Nashville, Tennessee)
- Genre: Country
- Length: 31:05
- Label: Epic Records
- Producer: Bob Montgomery

Tammy Wynette chronology
Next to You (1989)	Heart Over Mind (1990)	Honky Tonk Angels (1993)

Singles from Heart Over Mind
- 1. "Let's Call It a Day Today" Released: August 1990; 2. "I'm Turning You Loose" Released: October 1990; 3. "What Goes with Blue" Released: January 1991

Heart Over Mind is the twenty-ninth studio album by American country music singer-songwriter Tammy Wynette. It was released on September 3, 1990, by Epic Records.

== Chart performance ==
The album peaked at No. 64 on the Billboard Top Country Albums chart. The album's lead single, Let's Call It a Day", peaked at No. 57 on the Billboard Hot Country Singles & Tracks chart. The second single, "I'm Turning You Loose", did not chart. The album's third and final single, "What Goes with Blue", reached a peak position of No. 56.

== Track listing ==
Side one
No.	Title	Writer(s)	Length
1.	"Let’s Call It a Day Today"	Don Pfrimmer, Byron Gallimore	3:30
2.	"I’m Turning You Loose"	Sonny Throckmorton, Curly Putman	3:18
3.	"Suddenly Single"	Max D. Barnes, Troy Seals	2:58
4.	"What Goes with Blue"	Paul Nelson, Dave Gibson	3:21
5.	"Just For a Minute There"	Chester Lester	3:16

Side two
No.	Title	Writer(s)	Length
1.	"Half the Way Home"	Wanda Mallette	3:28
2.	"I’m Falling Heart Over Mind"	Tim Mensy, Don Cook	2:24
3.	"Where’s the Fire?"	Ron Moore, Lari White	2:53
4.	"If You Were the Friend"	Tim Mensy, Debbie Hupp	3:06
5.	"One Stone at a Time"	Gary Heyde, Kevin Morris	2:51

== Personnel ==
- Lea Jane Berinati - backing vocals
- Larry Byrom - electric guitar
- Kathy Ciavola - backing vocals
- Gene Eichelberger - recording and mixing
- Paul Franklin - steel guitar
- Bill Hullett - acoustic guitar
- Roy Huskey, Jr. - bass guitar
- Bill Johnson - album art design
- Toni Jolene - backing vocals
- Larry Keith - backing vocals
- Harry Langdon - album photography
- Tim Mensy - acoustic guitar
- Shawn McLean - recording and mixing assistant
- Terry McMillan - harmonica
- Bob Montgomery - producer
- Cathy Moore - production assistant
- Kim Morrison - backing vocals
- Ron Oats - keyboards, arrangements
- Denny Purcell - mastering
- Jim Vest - steel guitar
- Lonnie Wilson - drums, percussion
- Bob Wray - bass guitar
- Tammy Wynette - lead vocals
- Jonathan Yudkin - mandolin

== Chart positions ==
=== Album ===
Year	Chart	Peak position
1990	Top Country Albums (Billboard)	64
1990	Australian Albums (ARIA)	135

=== Singles ===
Year	Single	Chart	Peak position
1990	"Let's Call It a Day Today"	Hot Country Singles & Tracks (Billboard)	57
1990	"I'm Turning You Loose"	—	—
1991	"What Goes with Blue"	Hot Country Singles & Tracks (Billboard)	56
