= Not Enough Hours in the Night =

Single by Doug Supernaw

from the album You Still Got Me
- B-side: "We're All Here
- Released: October 9, 1995
- Genre: Country
- Length: 3:11
- Label: Giant
- Songwriters: Aaron Barker; Kim Williams; Ron Harbin
- Producer: Richard Landis

Doug Supernaw singles chronology
"What'll You Do About Me" (1995)	"Not Enough Hours in the Night" (1995)	"She Never Looks Back" (1996)

"Not Enough Hours in the Night" is a song written by Aaron Barker, Kim Williams and Ron Harbin, and recorded by American country music artist Doug Supernaw. It was released in October 1995 as the first single from his album You Still Got Me. It peaked at #3 in the United States, and #4 in Canada, his highest-charting song in Canada. It was his third top five hit, as well as his only top ten hit in Canada.

== Music video ==
The music video was directed by Steven T. Miller and R. Brad Murano.

== Chart positions ==
"Not Enough Hours in the Night" debuted at #74 on the U.S. Billboard Hot Country Singles & Tracks for the week of October 14, 1995.

Chart (1995–1996)	Peak position
Canada Country Singles (RPM)	4
US Hot Country Songs (Billboard)	3

=== Year-end charts ===
Chart (1996)	Position
Canada Country Tracks (RPM)	52
US Country Songs (Billboard)	72
