= The Note (song) =

Single by Daryle Singletary

from the album Ain't It the Truth
- B-side: "I Let Her Lie"
- Released: November 17, 1997
- Genre: Country
- Length: 3:22
- Label: Giant
- Songwriter(s): Buck Moore; Michelle Ray
- Producer(s): Doug Johnson; John Hobbs

Daryle Singletary singles chronology
"Even the Wind" (1997)	"The Note" (1997)	"That's Where You're Wrong" (1998)

"The Note" is a country music song written by Buck Moore and Michele Ray. The most famous version of the song was recorded by Daryle Singletary, whose version was the lead single to his 1998 album Ain't It the Truth.

== Content ==
The song is about a man who witnesses a breakup through a note left by his former lover.

== History ==
The song was first cut by Conway Twitty on his 1985 album Don't Call Him a Cowboy.

Gene Watson recorded a version of 'The Note' and included the track on his 1985 album Memories to Burn.

Tammy Wynette recorded a version of the song for her 1989 album Next To You.

It also appeared on Doug Supernaw's 1995 album You Still Got Me, which, like Singletary's version, was released through Giant Records Nashville. Doug Johnson, then-president of Giant Records Nashville, said that he had "no idea" about the song's history. Singletary discovered the song through a friend of his bass player's wife, and Johnson had discovered it through a song plugger.

== Critical reception ==
A review in Billboard was positive, saying that "this young traditionalist can stand toe to toe with such master stylists as Merle Haggard and George Jones" and "the lyric is one that listeners will find themselves singing along with."

== Chart performance ==
Although the song was not officially released until November 17, 1997, many stations on the Billboard survey added it prior to the single's release.

Chart (1997–1998)	Peak position
US Billboard Hot 100	90
US Hot Country Songs (Billboard)	28
