= Next to You (Tammy Wynette album) =

Studio album by Tammy Wynette
- Released: March 7, 1989
- Recorded: November 1988; Nashville, TN
- Genre: Country
- Length: 31:17
- Label: Epic Records
- Producer: Norro Wilson

Tammy Wynette chronology
Higher Ground (1987)	Next to You (1989)	Heart Over Mind (1990)

Singles from Next to You
- 1. "Next to You" Released: January 1989; 2. "Thank the Cowboy for the Ride" Released: May 1989

Professional ratings
Review scores
Source	Rating
Allmusic	3/5 stars

Next to You is the twenty-eighth studio album by American country music singer-songwriter Tammy Wynette. It was released on March 7, 1989, by Epic Records.

== Commercial performance ==
The album reached No. 42 on the Billboard Top Country Albums chart. The album's first single, "Next to You", peaked at No. 51 on the Billboard Hot Country Singles chart, and the second single, "Thank the Cowboy for the Ride", peaked at No. 66.

== Reception ==
Spin wrote, "Even when the album's at its worst, the sing-song inanity of "When a Girl Becomes a Wife", Tammy's shimmering vox rescue it to reasonability. Tammy Wynette's records sounds like therapy."

== Track listing ==
Side one
No.	Title	Writer(s)	Length
1.	"Next to You"	Allen Estes, Chris Hill	3:24
2.	"(I'm So) Afraid of Losing You Again"	Dallas Frazier, A.L. "Doodle" Owens	3:01
3.	"You Left Memories Layin’ (All Over the Place)"	Roger Brown, Rick Peoples	2:52
4.	"When a Girl Becomes a Wife"	Tammy Wynette, George Richey	3:24
5.	"If You Let Him Drive You Crazy (He Will)"	Curly Putman, Don Cook, Max D. Barnes	3:19

Side two
No.	Title	Writer(s)	Length
1.	"The Note"	Buck Moore, Michelle Ray	3:09
2.	"Thank the Cowboy for the Ride"	Paul Richey, Ed Bruce	3:22
3.	"I Almost Forgot"	Karen Staley	3:35
4.	"We Called It Everything But Quits"	Barry Paul Jackson, Toni Dae, Jerry Taylor	2:31
5.	"Liar’s Roses"	Bill Rice, Sharon Vaughn	2:40

== Personnel ==
- Norro Wilson - producer
- Denny Purcell - mastering
- Bill Johnson - album art direction
- Randee St. Nicholas - album photography
- Randal Mertin - art assistance

== Chart positions ==
=== Album ===
Year	Chart	Peak position
1989	Top Country Albums (Billboard)	42

=== Singles ===
Year	Single	Chart	Peak position
1989	"Next to You"	Hot Country Singles (Billboard)	51
1989	"Thank the Cowboy for the Ride"	Hot Country Singles (Billboard)	66
