= Don Cox (singer) =

American singer-songwriter

- Born: January 14, 1964 (age 61); Belhaven, North Carolina
- Genres: Country
- Occupation: Singer
- Years active: 1984–present
- Labels: Step One Records
- Formerly of: Super Grit Cowboy Band

Don Cox (born January 14, 1964, in Belhaven, North Carolina) is an American country music singer.

Cox began his career as a member of the Super Grit Cowboy Band. Between 1994 and 1996, he released two albums on Step One Records. His 1994 single "All Over Town" peaked at number 53 on the Billboard Hot Country Singles & Tracks chart.

Cox unsuccessfully ran for election as a Beaufort County commissioner in 2014 and 2016. In 2019 he ran unsuccessfully in the Republican Party primary for the North Carolina 3rd congressional district special election. Cox finished in a distant 15th place out of 17 candidates garnering 251 votes out of 42,175 votes cast or 0.6 of the vote.

== Discography ==
=== Albums ===
| Title | Album details |
|---|---|
| All Over Town | Release date: 1994; Label: Step One Records |
| Each One's a Winner | Release date: 1996; Label: Step One Records |

=== Singles ===
| Year | Single | Peak positions | Album |
| Year | Single | US Country | Album |
|---|---|---|---|
| 1994 | "All Over Town" | 53 | All Over Town |
| 1994 | "In My Father's Eyes" | — | All Over Town |
| 1995 | "Honey, Don't Pay the Ransom" | — | All Over Town |
| 1997 | "Sweet Sweet Woman" | — | Each One's a Winner |
"—" denotes releases that did not chart

=== Music videos ===
| Year | Video | Director |
|---|---|---|
| 1994 | "In My Father's Eyes" | Bob Whitt |
| 1995 | "Honey, Don't Pay the Ransom" | Greg Crutcher |
