= Trying to Be Me (album) =

Studio album by Laura Bryna
- Released: January 22, 2008
- Studios: Sony/Tree Studios, OmniSound Studios, Quad Studios, The Compound, Loud Recording, Blackbird Studios, 1808 Studios, The Insanery and Vibe 56 (Nashville, Tennessee); Sound Kitchen (Franklin, Tennessee)
- Genre: Country
- Label: Equity Music Group
- Producers: Roger Sarchet; Kyle Lehning

Trying to Be Me is the only album by American country music singer Laura Bryna. It was released on January 22, 2008 via Equity Music Group. "Make a Wish", "Life Is Good" and "Hometown Heroes" were all released as singles.

== Critical reception ==
Country Weekly gave the album two-and-a-half stars out of five, praising Bryna's voice but criticizing the album for containing "some of the most over-the-top tear-jerkers in recent memory." Jacquilynne Schlesier of Country Standard Time similarly said that Bryna had "lots of character in the phrasing", but said "most of the lyrics sound like songs you've heard before." PopMatters also criticized the album for "play[ing] a variety of obvious cards in her pursuit of country or pop audiences."

== Track listing ==
No.	Title	Writer(s)	Length
1.	"Life Is Good"	Billy Crain, Tammy Hyler, Liz Rose	3:32
2.	"Maybe She Fell"	Pat Bunch, Georgia Middleman	4:15
3.	"Set It on Fire"	Tony Mullins, Danny Wells	3:36
4.	"Room 228"	Victoria Banks	3:08
5.	"Same Dog"	Jennifer Hanson, Mark Nesler, Tony Martin	3:06
6.	"Make a Wish"	Laura Bryna, Jeff Batson, Roger Sarchet, Steven J. Williams	3:31
7.	"Out the Window"	Marv Green, Chris Lindsey, Hillary Lindsey, Aimee Mayo	3:21
8.	"640 Battlefield Dr."	Bonnie Baker, Connie Harrington	4:13
9.	"According to the Radio"	Monty Powell, Keith Urban	4:08
10.	"She Can't Save Him"	Sherrié Austin, Will Rambeaux, Steven J. Williams	4:20
11.	"No Man's Land"	Kaci Bolls, Marty Dodson, Liz Hengber	3:01
12.	"Smoke from a Bridge You Burned"	Skip Ewing, Donny Kees	3:46

Bonus track
No.	Title	Writer(s)	Length
13.	"I Don't Have a Thing to Wear"	Monty Holmes, Monty Criswell	3:40

== Personnel ==
- Laura Bryna – lead vocals
- Tony Harrell – keyboards
- John Hobbs – acoustic piano, Hammond B3 organ
- John Barlow Jarvis – acoustic piano, Hammond B3 organ
- Bob Patin – acoustic piano, Hammond B3 organ
- Mike Rojas – acoustic piano, Hammond B3 organ
- Catherine Styron-Marx – acoustic piano, Hammond B3 organ
- Bryan Austin – electric guitars
- Jeff King – electric guitars
- Brent Mason – electric guitars
- Dan Dugmore – electric guitars, acoustic guitar, 12-string acoustic guitar, pedal steel guitar
- Steve Gibson – acoustic guitar
- Kerry Marx – acoustic guitar
- Michael Noble – acoustic guitar, 12-string acoustic guitar
- Billy Panda – acoustic guitar, mandolin
- Mike Severs – acoustic guitar
- Ilya Toshinsky – acoustic guitar, electric guitars, banjo, mandolin
- Sonny Garrish – dobro, steel guitar
- Mike Douchette – steel guitar
- Mike Johnson – steel guitar
- Zach Runquist – mandolin, cello, violin
- David Hungate – bass guitar
- Alison Prestwood – bass guitar
- Michael Rhodes – bass guitar
- Eddie Bayers – drums
- Paul Leim – drums, percussion
- Greg Morrow – drums
- Casey Wood – chimes, cymbals, shaker, tambourine, timpani, gongs
- Kirk "JellyRoll" Johnson – harmonica (5, 11)
- Larry Franklin – fiddle
- Andrea Zonn – fiddle (2, 12)
- Larry Hall – strings
- Bekka Bramlett – backing vocals
- Lisa Cochran – backing vocals
- Perry Coleman – backing vocals
- Thom Flora – backing vocals
- Tania Hancheroff – backing vocals
- Wes Hightower – backing vocals
- Gale Mayes West – backing vocals
- Kim Parent – backing vocals
- Angela Primm – backing vocals
- Chris Rodriguez – backing vocals
- Russell Terrell – backing vocals

=== Production ===
- Roger Sarchet – producer, management
- Kyle Lehning – producer (3, 6, 8, 9, 13), mixing
- Pat McMackin – recording, additional mixing
- Casey Wood – recording, overdub recording (3, 13), additional engineer (6, 8, 9)
- Jason Lehning – engineer (6, 8, 9)
- Adam Engelhardt – recording assistant, mix assistant
- Paul Hart – recording assistant, mix assistant
- Matt Coles – recording assistant (3, 13)
- Lowell Reynolds – assistant engineer (6)
- Eric Tonkin – additional vocal engineer and editing
- Doug Sax – mastering
- Sangwook Nam – mastering
- The Mastering Lab (Hollywood, California) – mastering location
- Lorna Leighton – art direction, design
- flytedesign.com – art direction, design
- Dana Tynan – photography
- Felix Fischer – hair stylist
- John Stapleton – make-up
- WRPG Management, Inc. – management
