= Philip Claypool =

American singer-songwriter

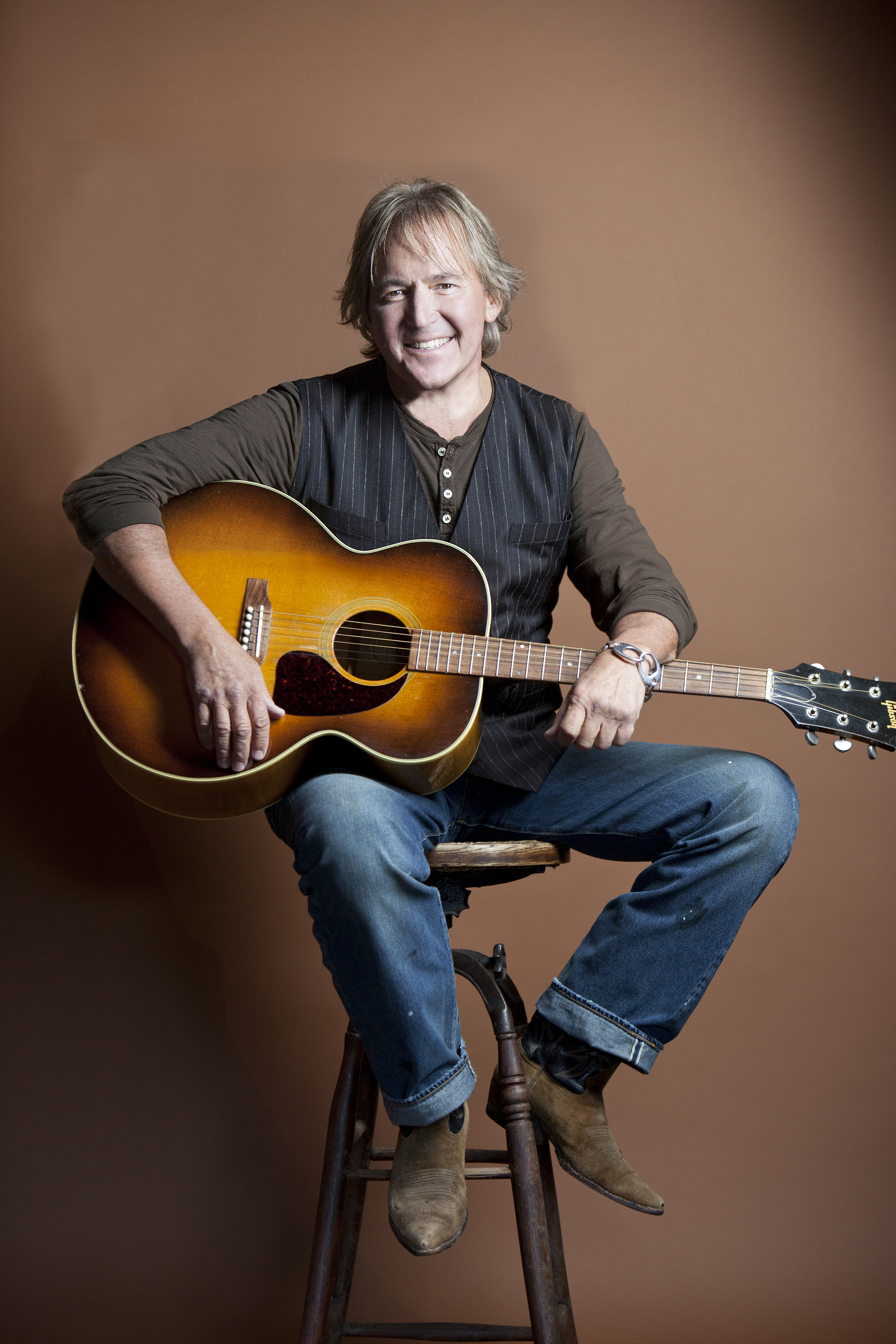
- Philip Claypool 2013

Background information
- Origin: Memphis, Tennessee, United States
- Genres: Country
- Occupation: Singer-songwriter
- Instruments: Vocals, guitar
- Years active: 1995–present
- Labels: Curb, HeyDay Productions
- Website: www.philipclaypool.com/home/

Philip Kennard Claypool (born in Memphis, Tennessee) is an American country music artist. Between 1995 and 1999, he recorded two studio albums for the Curb Records label (1995's A Circus Leaving Town and 1999's Perfect World), in addition to charting four singles on the Billboard Hot Country Singles & Tracks (now Hot Country Songs) charts. His highest-charting single was a cover of Bad Company's 1975 hit "Feel Like Makin' Love."

== Biography ==
Philip Claypool was born and raised in Memphis, Tennessee. His mother, a church organist, influenced him to take interest in gospel music. By the time he was in high school, Claypool had begun writing songs as well, and by age 21, he had made his first professional performance.

By 1995, Claypool had signed to Curb Records as a recording artist. Working with producer Jerry Crutchfield, he released his debut album A Circus Leaving Town that same year. This album produced four chart singles on the Billboard Hot Country Singles & Tracks charts (now Hot Country Songs). Among these were the title track (which was later recorded by Travis Tritt on his 2004 album My Honky Tonk History) and Claypool's highest-charting hit, a cover of British band Bad Company's 1975 single "Feel Like Makin' Love".

Claypool's debut album received a three-star rating from Stephen Thomas Erlewine of Allmusic, who called it "a diverse collection [b]uilding on a solid contemporary base", with "intriguing" production that "sav[ed] even the weakest tracks". Dan Kuchar of Country Standard Time noted Claypool's "leather and velvet" voice but said that, except for the Bad Company cover and one other song, the material was largely "tired, cliché-laden… [and] devoid of any hooks". Claypool himself described the album as being "left of center". In a 1996 interview with Modern Screen's Country Music magazine, he called it "more mature" but "a little distanced from what is happening radio-wise".

Claypool also recorded a song for the soundtrack to the 1998 film Major League: Back to the Minors His self-produced second album, Perfect World, was released in 1999, although it contained no chart singles and mostly comprised material from his first album. In late 2012, Claypool recorded his first album in over a decade. Scheduled to be released in 2013, it was produced by Michael Lloyd. The first single from the album, "I'm Gonna Lie", was released on March 18, 2013.

Claypool is now the resident musician at Southend Brewery and Smokehouse in Charleston, South Carolina, home of the Big Pig and celebrity chef Orlando Barrera.

== Discography ==
=== Albums ===
| Title | Album details |
|---|---|
| A Circus Leaving Town | Release date: November 21, 1995; Label: Curb Records |
| Perfect World | Release date: July 6, 1999; Label: Curb Records |
| Come On Back Home | Release date: June 19, 2014; Label: Heyday Records |

=== Singles ===
| Year | Single | Peak positions | Album |
| Year | Single | US Country | Album |
|---|---|---|---|
| 1995 | "Swingin' on My Baby's Chain" | 71 | A Circus Leaving Town |
| 1995 | "Feel Like Makin' Love" | 60 | A Circus Leaving Town |
| 1996 | "The Strength of a Woman" | 73 | A Circus Leaving Town |
| 1996 | "Circus Leaving Town" | 70 | A Circus Leaving Town |
| 1998 | "Looking Up from a Long Way Down" | — | Major League: Back to the Minors (soundtrack) |
| 2013 | "I'm Gonna Lie" | — | Come On Back Home |
| 2013 | "Strong One" | — | Come On Back Home |
| 2014 | "Come On Back Home" | — | Come On Back Home |
| 2015 | "Three More Beers" | — | Come On Back Home |
"—" denotes releases that did not chart

=== Music videos ===
| Year | Video | Director |
|---|---|---|
| 1995 | "Swingin' on My Baby's Chain" | Roger Pistole |
| 1995 | "The Strength of a Woman" | Chris Rogers |
| 1998 | "Looking Up from a Long Way Down" | |
| 2014 | "Jack Daniel and Mr. Jim Beam" | |
| 2015 | "Three More Beers" | |
