= Laura Bryna =

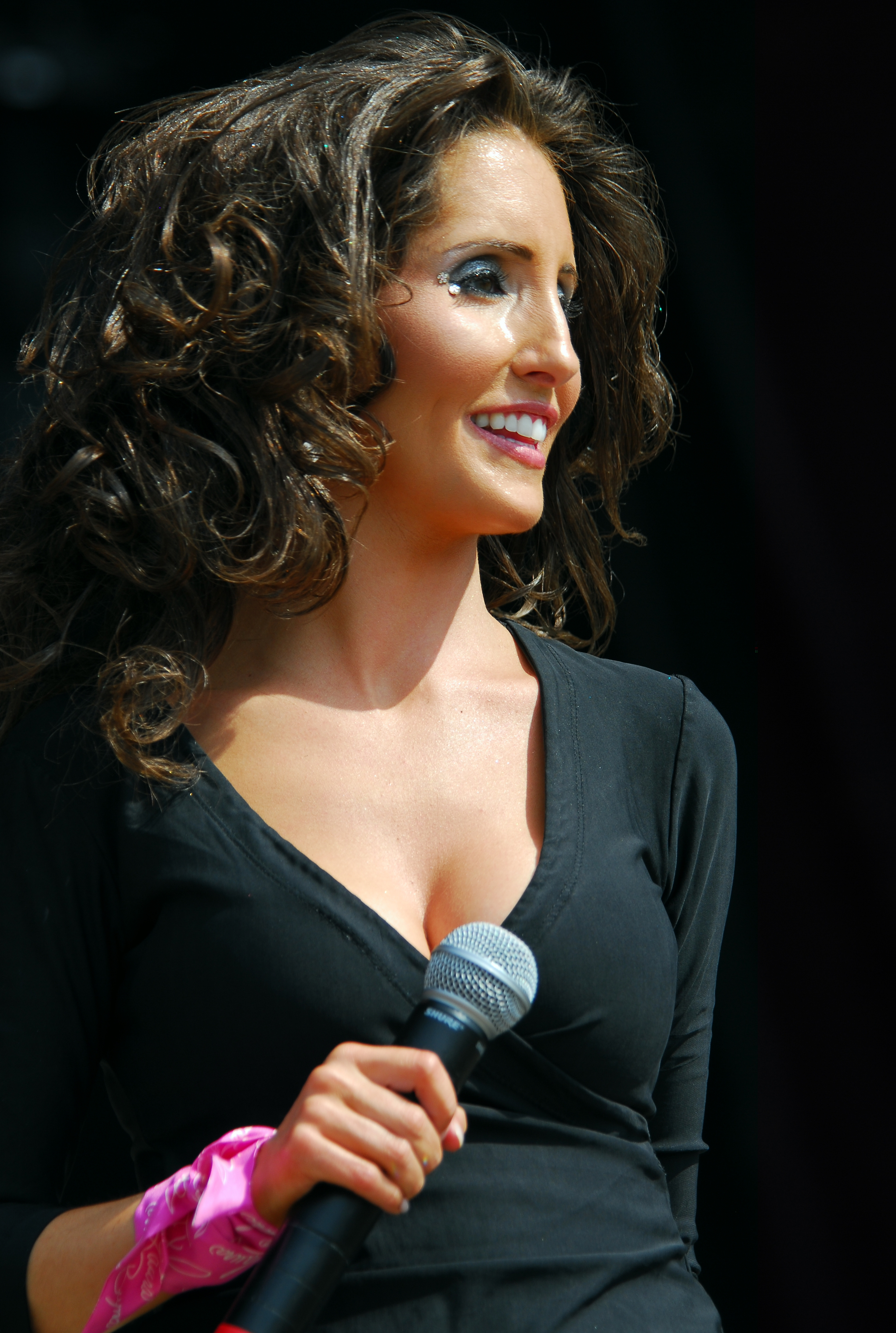
- Bryna in 2024

Background information
- Born: Mount Airy, Maryland, U.S.
- Genre: Country
- Occupations: Singer, actress
- Years active: 2006—present
- Label: Equity Music Group

Laura Bryna is an American country music singer. She has released one album, Trying to Be Me, has been involved in the Make-A-Wish Foundation, and has shared the stage with other notable country artists like Taylor Swift and Emmylou Harris.

== Biography ==
Laura Bryna first gained an interest in country music on road trips to Washington, D.C. while her brother was in a hospital there. After attending Philadelphia's University of the Arts, she starred in a musical called Rasputin and moved to Nashville, Tennessee. There, she got internships at Sony Tree Publishing and DreamWorks Publishing.

Bryna toured with Black in late 2007. To promote her debut album, Bryna broadcast the music video for the single "Make a Wish" on flat-screen monitors in the Luxor and Excalibur Hotel and Casino in Las Vegas for one month. She also performed at the Fashion Show Mall and had 10,000-square-foot (930 m^{2}) images of herself on top of the Luxor's tower. On January 14, she held a release party for the album at the Luxor, and included a bonus track called "I Don't Have a Thing to Wear" on a special edition of the album which was released only at the Luxor and Excalibur.

In April 2008, Bryna joined the board of directors for the Make-A-Wish Foundation of the Mid-Atlantic. She also released another single, "Life Is Good", in early 2008. She has continued to tour and perform at various venues, including a performance at the House of Blues in 2009. In 2010, she became the host of GoTV Networks' True Country show.

In 2022, Bryna released the single "Jawbreaker". The single received acclaim from critics, highlighting her voice and energetic musical style.

In 2023, Bryna released "Certified", a track about warning off men who would try to outshine her. The song was added by more than 100 radio stations and later remixed by producer Deerock. The song made it to the top 50 on both the Mediabase Indicator and MusicRow charts and became a top trending song on the app Shazam.

== Discography ==
=== Albums ===
Title	Album details
Trying to Be Me	Release date: January 22, 2008; Label: Equity Music Group; Format: CD

=== Singles ===
Year	Single	Peak chart positions
Year	Single	US AC
2007	"I Don't Have a Thing to Wear"	—
2008	"Make a Wish"	—
2008	"Life Is Good"	—
2008	"Hometown Heroes"	—
2025	"Rise" (with Common Tribe)	25

=== Music videos ===
Year	Single
2007	"I Don't Have a Thing to Wear"
2008	"Make a Wish"
2008	"Life Is Good"
2008	"Hometown Heroes"
