= Too Much Fun (song) =

Single by Daryle Singletary

from the album Daryle Singletary
- Released: November 27, 1995
- Recorded: 1995
- Genre: Country
- Length: 2:45
- Label: Giant
- Songwriters: Curtis Wright; Jeff Knight
- Producers: James Stroud; Randy Travis; David Malloy

Daryle Singletary singles chronology
"I Let Her Lie" (1995)	"Too Much Fun" (1995)	"Workin' It Out" (1996)

"Too Much Fun" is a song written by Curtis Wright and Jeff Knight, and recorded by American country music singer Daryle Singletary. It was released in November 1995 as the third single from his self-titled debut album. It peaked at number 4 on the U.S. Billboard Hot Country Singles & Tracks chart and at number 10 on the RPM Country Tracks chart in Canada. American mixed martial artist Chael Sonnen frequently uses this song for his entrance music in the UFC.

== Critical reception ==
Deborah Evans Price, of Billboard magazine reviewed the song favorably, calling it a "fun, uptempo romp." She goes on to say that the track has "lots of energy and is highlighted by some blazing harmonica, and Singletary's voice rides the crest of fun with good-old fashioned down-home charm."

== Music video ==
The music video was co-directed by Steven T. Miller and R. Brad Murano and premiered in November 1995. The video features Singletary as the driver of a blue Dodge Ram pickup truck hauling his band members in a police chase along county roads around Hunt County, Texas, ending with Singletary arriving at the Texas Star honky-tonk off of Interstate 30 in Greenville to perform a impromptu concert in the parking lot of the nightclub.

== Chart positions ==
"Too Much Fun" debuted at number 63 on the U.S. Billboard Hot Country Singles & Tracks for the week of December 9, 1995.

Chart (1995–1996)	Peak position
Canada Country Singles (RPM)	10
US Hot Country Songs (Billboard)	4

=== Year-end charts ===
Chart (1996)	Position
Canada Country Tracks (RPM)	99
US Country Songs (Billboard)	54
