= Lynn Peterzell =

American musician

Lynn Meyer Peterzell (January 10, 1955 – September 8, 1994) was a country music audio engineer from Nashville, Tennessee.

Lynn Peterzell was raised in Pascagoula, Mississippi by Frances and Milton Peterzell. He was the third of five children.

== Professional career ==
Peterzell began recording and engineering music shortly after he dropped out of high school. He followed his brother Lee, also an engineer, into the recording studio. Early works include work with Eddie Rabbitt and Charlie Daniels.

From the late 1980s until his death, he moved to the forefront of country engineers. Credits include all of Clint Black's albums prior to his death, as well as Tim McGraw's first two albums and Shania Twain's second album The Woman In Me.

He was awarded the 1994 CMA Album of the Year award posthumously, for producing a track on the album Common Thread: The Songs of the Eagles.

== Death ==
Lynn Peterzell died of a heart attack at the age of 39, while at work in the studio.
