= John Wesley Ryles =

American singer-songwriter (1950–2025)

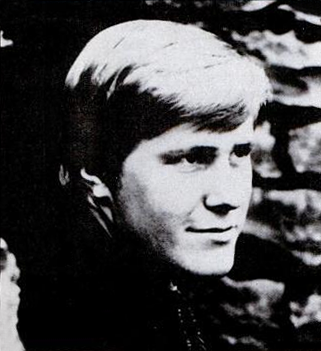
- Ryles in 1970

Background information
- Also known as: John Wesley Ryles I
- Born: December 2, 1950; Bastrop, Louisiana, U.S.
- Died: November 2, 2025 (aged 74)
- Genres: Country
- Occupations: Singer-songwriter; Session musician
- Instruments: Vocals; guitar
- Years active: 1968–1971; 1976–2025
- Labels: Columbia; RCA; Plantation; Music Mill; ABC/Dot; MCA; Primero; 16th Avenue; Warner Bros.
- Spouse: Joni Lee

John Wesley Ryles (December 2, 1950 – November 2, 2025) was an American country music artist. He recorded a string of hit country songs, beginning in 1968 when he was still a teenager and continuing through the 1980s. His recordings include the 1968 single "Kay", a top-ten hit on the Billboard country charts. From the late 1980s until his death, Ryles worked mainly as a session backing vocalist.

== Life and career ==
John Wesley Ryles was born in Bastrop, Louisiana, on December 2, 1950. At age 17, he made his debut in 1968 with the single "Kay", a Top Ten hit on the Billboard Hot Country Singles (now Hot Country Songs) charts, and the title track to his debut album for Columbia Records.

Ryles later recorded one album, Reconsider Me, for the Plantation label, which produced a No. 39 single in its title track. It was followed by two non-album singles, "Tell It Like It Is" and "When a Man Loves a Woman," both on the Music Mill label in 1976. He then moved to Dot Records. His first single on ABC/Dot, "Fool", made it to No. 18 on the Hot Country chart followed by his highest-peaking single, the No. 5 "Once in a Lifetime Thing." When that label merged with MCA Records, he issued the album Let the Night Begin there. The first single, "Liberated Woman", climbed to No. 14 on the Billboard Hot Country chart. It was followed by a rendition of "Always on My Mind", which went to No. 20 on the Billboard Hot Country chart. The last song released from this album, "Perfect Strangers", reached No. 24 on the Billboard chart.

Two more singles followed on the Primero label: "We've Got to Start Meeting Like This" and "Just Once", followed by "She Took It Too Well" on 16th Avenue Records in 1984. The last label for which he recorded was Warner Bros. Records between 1987 and 1988. Although he reached the Top 20 with "Louisiana Rain" during his stay on Warner, he did not release an album for the label.

Following the release of his last single in 1988, Ryles was primarily a background vocalist. He was married to Joni Lee, the daughter of country singer Conway Twitty.

Ryles died on November 2, 2025, at the age of 74.

== Discography ==
=== Albums ===
Year	Album	Chart Positions	Label
Year	Album	US Country	Label
1969	Kay	22	Columbia
1971	Reconsider Me	—	Plantation
1977	John Wesley Ryles	39	ABC/Dot
1978	Shine on Me	—	ABC
1978	Love's Sweet Pain	—	ABC
1979	Let the Night Begin	—	MCA

=== Singles ===
Year	Single	Chart Positions			Album
Year	Single	US Country	CAN Country	AU	Album
1968	"Kay"^{A, B}	9	6	38	Kay
1969	"Heaven Below"^{B}	55	—	—	Kay
1970	"The Weakest Kind of Man"^{B}	57	—	—	Kay
1970	"I've Just Been Wasting My Time"^{B}	17	6	—	Kay
1971	"Reconsider Me"^{B}	39	—	—	Reconsider Me
1976	"Tell It Like It Is"	83	—	—	John Wesley Ryles
1976	"When a Man Loves a Woman"	72	—	—	John Wesley Ryles
1977	"Fool"	18	—	—	John Wesley Ryles
1977	"Once in a Lifetime Thing"	5	9	—	John Wesley Ryles
1978	"Shine on Me (The Sun Still Shines When It Rains)"	13	14	—	Shine on Me
1978	"Easy"	63	—	—	single only
1978	"Kay" (new recording)	50	55	—	Shine on Me
1978	"Someday You Will"	45	—	—	Love's Sweet Pain
1979	"Love Ain't Made for Fools"	33	40	—	Love's Sweet Pain
1979	"Liberated Woman"	14	17	—	Let the Night Begin
1979	"You Are Always on My Mind"	20	24	—	Let the Night Begin
1980	"Perfect Strangers"	24	—	—	Let the Night Begin
1980	"May I Borrow Some Sugar from You"	52	—	—	singles only
1980	"Cheater's Trap"	54	—	—	singles only
1981	"Somewhere to Come When It Rains"	80	—	—	singles only
1981	"Mathilda"	78	—	—	singles only
1982	"We've Got to Start Meeting Like This"	76	—	—	singles only
1982	"Just Once"	80	—	—	singles only
1984	"She Took It Too Well"	78	—	—	singles only
1987	"Midnight Blue"	36	—	—	singles only
1987	"Louisiana Rain"	20	—	—	singles only
1988	"Nobody Knows"	53	—	—	singles only

- ^{A}Peaked at No. 83 on Billboard Hot 100 and No. 88 on RPM Top Singles.
- ^{B}Credited to John Wesley Ryles I.
