= I Let Her Lie =

Single by Daryle Singletary

from the album Daryle Singletary
- B-side: "Ordinary Heroes"
- Released: July 17, 1995
- Genre: Country
- Length: 2:58
- Label: Giant
- Songwriter: Tim Johnson
- Producers: James Stroud, Randy Travis, David Malloy

Daryle Singletary singles chronology
"I'm Living Up to Her Low Expectations" (1995)	"I Let Her Lie" (1995)	"Too Much Fun" (1996)

"I Let Her Lie" is a song written by Tim Johnson, and recorded by American country music artist Daryle Singletary. It was released in July 1995 as the second single from the album Daryle Singletary. The song reached number 2 on the Billboard Hot Country Singles & Tracks chart, behind "Check Yes or No" by George Strait.

== Critical reception ==
Larry Flick, a writer for Billboard magazine, reviewed the song favorably, saying that Singletary has a "stone country voice that does justice to the lyric, as pain turns to resignation."

== Music video ==
The music video was directed by Steven T. Miller with R. Brad Murano and premiered in mid-1995.

== Chart performance ==
"I Let Her Lie" debuted at number 66 on the U.S. Billboard Hot Country Singles & Tracks for the week of July 29, 1995.

Chart (1995)	Peak position
Canada Country Singles (RPM)	2
US Hot Country Songs (Billboard)	2

=== Year-end charts ===
Chart (1995)	Position
Canada Country Tracks (RPM)	37
US Country Songs (Billboard)	70
