= Amen Kind of Love =

Single by Daryle Singletary

from the album All Because of You
- Released: October 1, 1996
- Genre: Country
- Length: 3:27
- Label: Giant
- Songwriters: Trey Bruce, Wayne Tester
- Producers: James Stroud, David Malloy

Daryle Singletary singles chronology
"Workin' It Out" (1996)	"Amen Kind of Love" (1996)	"The Used to Be's" (1997)

"Amen Kind of Love" is a song written by Trey Bruce and Wayne Tester, and recorded by American country music artist Daryle Singletary. It was released in October 1996 as the first single from the album All Because of You. The song reached number 2 on the Billboard Hot Country Singles & Tracks chart, behind Rick Trevino's "Running Out of Reasons to Run".

== Critical reception ==
Larry Flick, of Billboard magazine reviewed the song favorably, saying it is the "perfect marriage of voice and song." He goes on to say that "his phrasing, accented by fiddle and steel guitar, should make country programmers want to stand up and testify (to borrow a word from the song)."

== Music video ==
The music video was directed by Jeffrey Phillips and premiered in September 1996.

== Chart performance ==
"Amen Kind of Love" debuted at number 68 on the U.S. Billboard Hot Country Singles & Tracks for the week of October 12, 1996.

Chart (1996–1997)	Peak position
Canada Country Singles (RPM)	2
US Hot Country Songs (Billboard)	2

=== Year-end charts ===
Chart (1997)	Position
Canada Country Tracks (RPM)	78
US Country Songs (Billboard)	65
