= Jeff Knight (singer) =

American singer-songwriter

- Also known as: T. J. Knight
- Born: Thomas Jeff Knight; Thomas Jeff Knight
- Origin: El Paso, Texas, U.S.
- Genres: Country
- Occupation: Singer-songwriter
- Instrument: Vocals
- Years active: 1992-1996
- Label: Mercury

Thomas Jeff Knight is an American country music artist, sometimes credited as T.J. Knight. Born in El Paso, Texas, he later moved to the Allegheny Mountains region of Pennsylvania; after finding work as a truck driver, he moved to Nashville, Tennessee, where he signed to a publishing contract with a publishing company known as Music of the World. Among the artists who cut his songs are Pirates of the Mississippi, Johnny Cash, Clay Walker, and Vince Gill.

Knight was signed to a recording contract with Polygram Records/Mercury Records in 1992. He released two albums for the label and released four singles. He also wrote Daryle Singletary's 1996 single "Too Much Fun", for which Knight won a BMI award.

== Discography ==
=== Albums ===
Title	Album details
They've Been Talkin' About Me	Release date: April 21, 1992; Label: Polygram/Mercury Records
Easy Street	Release date: October 5, 1993; Label: Polygram/Mercury Records

=== Singles ===
Year	Single	Peak chart positions	Album
Year	Single	Cash Box Country	Album
1992	"They've Been Talkin' About Me"	46	They've Been Talkin' About Me
1992	"I Wish She Didn't Know Me"	—	They've Been Talkin' About Me
1992	"Someone Like You"	—	They've Been Talkin' About Me
1993	"Easy Street"	—	Easy Street
"—" denotes releases that did not chart

== Music videos ==
Year	Video	Director
1992	"They've Been Talkin' About Me"	
1992	"Someone Like You"	Thom Oliphant
1993	"Easy Street"	L. J. Kreussling

== Chart singles written by Jeff Knight ==
The following is a list of Jeff Knight compositions that were chart hits.

Year	Title	Recording artist	Chart positions	
Year	Title	Recording artist	Billboard Country	RPM Country
1995	Too Much Fun co-written with Curtis Wright	Daryle Singletary	4	10
2003	You Can't Take It With You When You Go co-written with Curtis Wright	Rhonda Vincent	58	
