= Curtis Wright =

American country music artist

- Born: Curtis Blaine Wright; June 6, 1955 (age 70)
- Origin: Huntingdon, Pennsylvania, United States
- Genres: Country
- Occupation: Singer-songwriter
- Instruments: Vocals, guitar
- Years active: 1974–present
- Labels: MCA/Airborne, Liberty, Voxhall Records
- Formerly of: Super Grit Cowboy Band, Orrall & Wright, Shenandoah, Pure Prairie League

Curtis Blaine Wright (born June 6, 1955) is an American country music artist. He first played in the 1970s and 80s as a member of the Super Grit Cowboy Band before becoming a solo artist in the late 1980s and early 1990s. Wright charted three singles on Billboard Hot Country Songs between 1990 and 1993. He has also recorded as a member of Orrall & Wright, Shenandoah, and Pure Prairie League. In addition to these, Wright holds several credits as a songwriter, including the number one singles "A Woman in Love" by Ronnie Milsap, "Next to You, Next to Me" by Shenandoah, and "What's It to You" by Clay Walker. Curtis Wright now resides in his hometown Huntington Pennsylvania with his wife Debra Demko Wright He continues writing and is pursuing his music career.

== Biography ==
Curtis Blaine Wright was born June 6, 1955, in Huntingdon, Pennsylvania.

Initially a member of a band known as the Country Generation, succeeded by the Super Grit Cowboy Band, Wright later performed as a backup vocalist and guitarist for Vern Gosdin. In December 1989, he quit Gosdin's band and wrote Ronnie Milsap's number one single "A Woman in Love". Wright signed with Airborne Records in 1989 and released "She's Got a Man on Her Mind", which charted at number 38 on Hot Country Songs. (A version of the same song by Conway Twitty charted one year later.) Wright was also slated to release an album titled Slick Hick in March 1990, which would have been produced by himself and Jeff Carlton. However, the album went unreleased due to financial issues with the label.

Later in the same year, he co-wrote Shenandoah's "Next to You, Next to Me" with Robert Ellis Orrall, and Steve Wariner's top 20 hit "There for Awhile". In 1992, Wright signed to Liberty Records, where he released his self-titled debut album that year. This album produced two more low-charting singles. It also included the song "What's It to You", which Wright also co-wrote with Orrall. Although Wright's version was never released as a single, Clay Walker later recorded this song on his 1993 debut album, and his version was a number one hit that year. He also co-wrote Shenandoah's 1992 single "Rock My Baby". Also in 1992, Wright co-wrote a song with fellow country singer Dennis Robbins and musician Warren Haynes which would become the title track of Robbins first Giant Records album called "Man With A Plan", for which Wright also provided backing vocals. By 1994, Wright joined Orrall to form Orrall & Wright, a duo which charted two singles, recorded one album for Giant Records and received a Duo of the Year nomination from the Country Music Association before disbanding. Wright later wrote Daryle Singletary's 1996 single "Too Much Fun".

After the departure of their former lead singer Brent Lamb (who, in turn, replaced Marty Raybon) in the late 1990s, Shenandoah chose Wright as their third lead singer. Wright left Shenandoah in 2007 to join Reba McEntire's band and Jimmy Yeary succeeded him. He also toured as a member of Pure Prairie League in the beginning of the 21st century. Curtis has returned to his central PA roots . He continues to write with his wife Debra Demko Wright their new song at the end of the Appalachian trail is a biography..

== Discography ==
=== Albums ===
Title	Album details
Slick Hick	Release date: Unreleased; Label: Airborne Records
Curtis Wright	Release date: July 14, 1992; Label: Liberty Records
Curtis Wright	Release date: April 22, 2016; Label: Voxhall Records

=== Singles ===
Year	Single	Peak chart positions		Album
Year	Single	US Country	CAN Country	Album
1989	"She's Got a Man on Her Mind"	38	—	Slick Hick (unreleased)
1990	"You Saved Me"	—	—	Slick Hick (unreleased)
1992	"Hometown Radio"	59	66	Curtis Wright (1992)
1993	"If I Could Stop Lovin' You"	53	79	Curtis Wright (1992)
2016	"Going Through Carolina"	—	—	Curtis Wright (2016)
"—" denotes releases that did not chart

=== Music videos ===
Year	Video	Director
1993	"If I Could Stop Lovin' You"	Michael Merriman

== Chart Singles written by Curtis Wright ==
The following is a list of Curtis Wright compositions that were chart hits.

Year	Single Title	Recording Artist	Chart Positions		
Year	Single Title	Recording Artist	Billboard Country	Billboard Hot 100	RPM Country
1982	She Is the Woman	Super Grit Cowboy Band	48		
1987	You Saved Me	Patty Loveless	43		
1989	Who Needs You	The Sanders	73		
1989	A Woman in Love co-written with Doug Millett	Ronnie Milsap	1		1
1989	Who's Lovin' My Baby	John Anderson	66		
1990	Next to You, Next to Me co-written with Robert Ellis Orrall	Shenandoah	1		1
1990	There for Awhile co-written with Anna Lisa Graham	Steve Wariner	17		16
1991	She's Got a Man on Her Mind co-written with Billy Spencer	Conway Twitty	22		43
1992	Rock My Baby co-written with Billy Spencer and Phil Whitley	Shenandoah	2		4
1993	What's It to You co-written with Robert Ellis Orrall	Clay Walker	1	73	1
1994	If I Ever Love Again co-written with Billy Spencer	Daron Norwood	48		52
1994	If You Could Say What I'm Thinking co-written with Robert Ellis Orrall	Orrall & Wright	70		68
1995	My Girl Friday co-written with Carl Jackson	Daron Norwood	58		
1995	Too Much Fun co-written with T. J. Knight	Daryle Singletary	4		10
1998	Takin' the Country Back co-written with Marty Stuart	John Anderson	41		69
1998	When You Get to Be You co-written with Dennis Robbins and Michael Dan Ehmig	Lisa Brokop	64		57
2003	You Can't Take It With You When You Go co-written with T. J. Knight	Rhonda Vincent	58		
2004	Go Home co-written with Jim Collins	Steve Holy	49		
2005	Get Outta My Way co-written with Robert Ellis Orrall	Carolina Rain	28		
