= Daryle Singletary =

American country music singer (1971–2018)

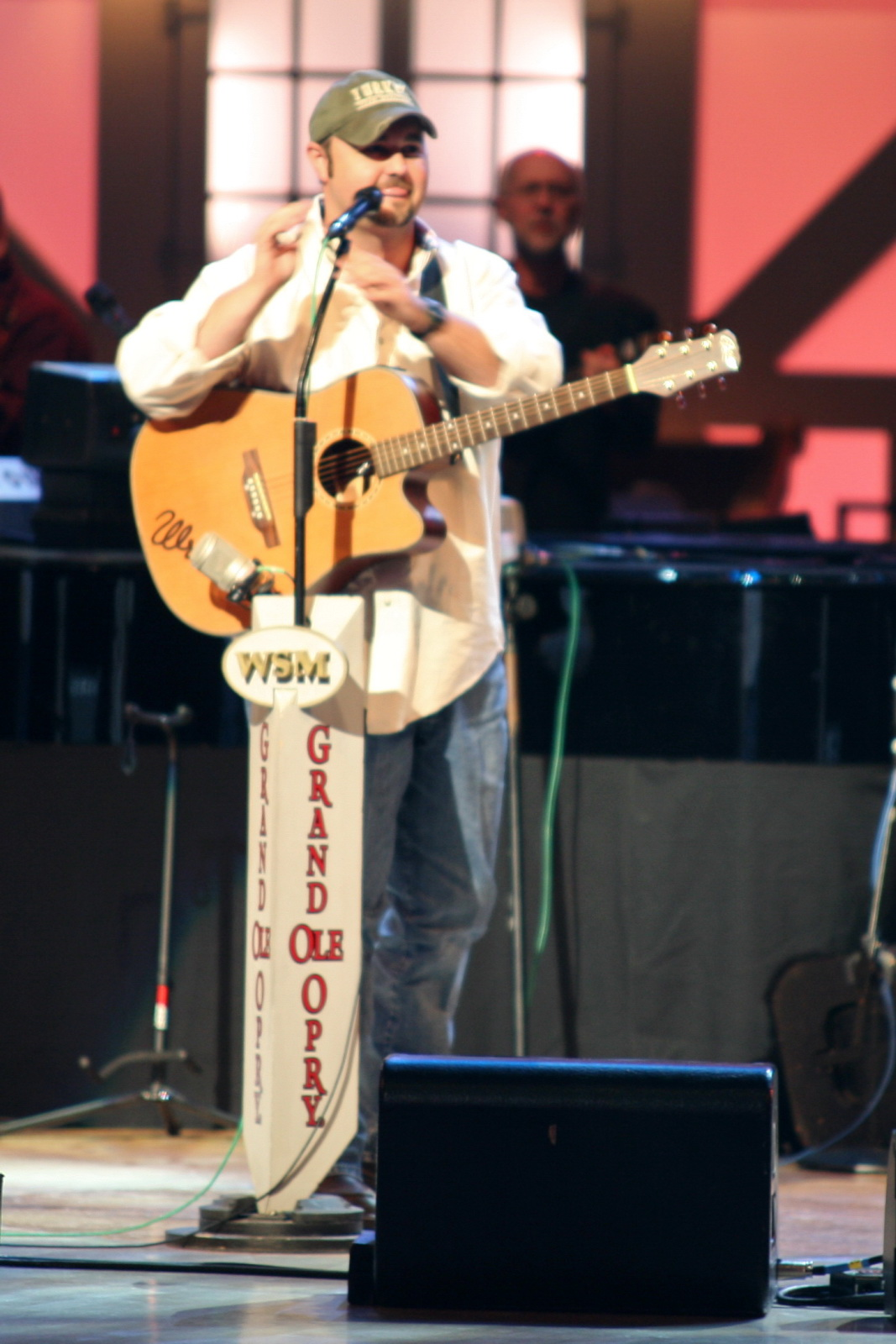
- Singletary performing at the Grand Ole Opry in 2007

Background information
- Born: Daryle Bruce Singletary; March 10, 1971; Cairo, Georgia, U.S.
- Died: February 12, 2018 (aged 46) Lebanon, Tennessee, U.S.
- Genre: Country
- Occupation: Singer
- Instruments: Vocals; guitar
- Years active: 1994–2018
- Labels: Giant; Audium; Shanachie; E1 Music
- Spouses: Kerry Harvick (m. 1995) Holly Mercer (m. 2003–2018)

Daryle Bruce Singletary (March 10, 1971 – February 12, 2018) was an American country music singer. Between 1995 and 1998, he recorded for Giant Records, for which he released three studio albums, Daryle Singletary (1995), All Because of You (1996), and Ain't It the Truth (1998). In the same timespan, Singletary entered the Top 40 of the Hot Country Songs charts five times, reaching number two with "I Let Her Lie" and "Amen Kind of Love", and number four with "Too Much Fun".

In 2000, Singletary switched to Audium Entertainment (now part of MNRK Music Group), where he released the albums Now and Again (2000) and That's Why I Sing This Way (2002), both of which were largely composed of cover songs. A third album of covers, Straight from the Heart (2007), was issued on the independent Shanachie Records label. He returned to E1 Music in 2010, to release Rockin' in the Country.

== Early life ==
Daryle Singletary was born March 10, 1971, in Cairo, Georgia. His father, Roger Singletary, was a postal worker, while his mother, Anita, was a hair dresser. At an early age, he sang gospel music with his cousins and brother. Later on, in high school, he began taking vocal classes as well. In 1990, he moved to Nashville, Tennessee, in pursuit of a record deal.

In Nashville, he found work singing during open-mic nights at various venues, before finding work as a demo singer. One of the demos that Singletary sang was "An Old Pair of Shoes", which Randy Travis eventually recorded. Travis recommended Singletary to his management team, who helped him sign to a recording contract with Giant Records.

== Career ==
=== 1995–1996: Self-titled album ===
Singletary's self-titled debut album was released in 1995. The lead-off single, "I'm Living Up to Her Low Expectations", spent one week in the Top 40 on the Billboard country charts, peaking at No. 39. It was followed by his biggest hit, the No. 2 "I Let Her Lie". This album also produced the No. 4 "Too Much Fun" and finally "Working It Out" at No. 50. Despite the two Top Five hits it produced, the album sold poorly and reached No. 44 on Top Country Albums. The album was produced by David Malloy, James Stroud and Randy Travis.

=== 1996–1997: All Because of You ===
A second album for Giant, All Because of You, was released in 1996. Although its lead-off single "Amen Kind of Love" became his second No. 2 hit that year, the album's other two tracks — "The Used to Be's" and "Even the Wind" — both fell short of Top 40, peaking at number 48 and 68 respectively.

=== 1998–1999: Ain't It the Truth ===
Ain't It the Truth, his third and final album for Giant, produced a minor hit in "The Note", which peaked at No. 28 on the country charts and No. 90 on the Billboard Hot 100. Despite this song's minor crossover success, however, this album also saw its second and third singles miss the Top 40, and Singletary was dropped from Giant's roster.

=== 2000–2001: Now and Again ===
In 2000, Singletary signed to Audium/Koch Entertainment to release his fourth album, 2000's Now and Again. This album's lead-off single was a cover of Savage Garden's 1999 pop single "I Knew I Loved You". Following it were "I've Thought of Everything" at No. 70, and the album's title track, which failed to chart.

=== 2002–2003: That's Why I Sing This Way ===
His second album for Audium/Koch, That's Why I Sing This Way, was mostly a cover album save for the title track. Both "That's Why I Sing This Way" and a cover of Conway Twitty's "I'd Love to Lay You Down" were released from this album, respectively reaching No. 47 and No. 43.

=== 2003–2018: Later years ===
After Audium/Koch closed its country division, Singletary signed to Shanachie Records. His first project for the label was a second album, 2007's Straight from the Heart, which was also largely composed of cover songs. Its singles, "I Still Sing This Way" and "Jesus & Bartenders", both failed to chart.

In 2009, Singletary returned to Koch under the label's new name of E1 Music. He released his next single, "Love You With the Lights On" in February. The single was the lead-off single to a new album, Rockin' in the Country, released in June 2009.

== Personal life ==
In 1995, Singletary married Kerry Harvick, also a country music singer and songwriter. By 2003, he had separated from Harvick and married Holly Mercer, a nurse originally from Waycross, Georgia.

Singletary died unexpectedly at his home in Lebanon, Tennessee, on the morning of February 12, 2018. The cause of death was not revealed at the time, although Taste of Country and The Boot both reported that Singletary's death was caused by a blood clot. Later that same year, Platinum Records Nashville released a posthumous single titled "She's Been Cheatin' on Us". Although the label announced that the song's proceeds were to benefit his family, a representative of the singer stated that no such fund existed, and that the recording was a demo that was never meant to be released.

== Discography ==
=== Studio albums ===
Title	Album details	Peak chart positions		
Title	Album details	US Country	US	US Heat
Daryle Singletary	Release date: May 23, 1995; Label: Giant Nashville; Formats: CD, cassette	44	—	27
All Because of You	Release date: October 8, 1996; Label: Giant Nashville; Formats: CD, cassette	60	—	—
Ain't It the Truth	Release date: February 24, 1998; Label: Giant Nashville; Formats: CD, cassette	18	160	7
That's Why I Sing This Way	Release date: April 23, 2002; Label: Audium/Koch Records; Formats: CD	65	—	—
Straight from the Heart	Release date: February 27, 2007; Label: Shanachie Records; Formats: CD, music download	74	—	—
Rockin' in the Country	Release date: June 9, 2009; Label: E1 Music; Formats: CD, music download	—	—	—
There's Still a Little Country Left	Release date: July 28, 2015; Label: TMF x 4 LLC; Formats: CD, music download	—	—	—
"—" denotes releases that did not chart

=== Collaboration albums ===
Title	Details	Peak chart positions		Sales
Title	Details	US Grass	US Country	Sales
American Grandstand (with Rhonda Vincent)	Release date: July 7, 2017; Label: Upper Management; Formats: CD, music download	1	45	US: 10,900

=== Compilation albums ===
Title	Album details
Now and Again	Release date: July 11, 2000; Label: Audium/Koch Records; Formats: CD, cassette
Live In Concert	Release date: March 16, 2007; Label: Big Band Concert Series; Formats: CD

=== Singles ===
Year	Single	Peak chart positions			Album
Year	Single	US Country	US	CAN Country	Album
1995	"I'm Living Up to Her Low Expectations"	39	—	35	Daryle Singletary
1995	"I Let Her Lie"	2	—	2	Daryle Singletary
1995	"Too Much Fun"	4	—	10	Daryle Singletary
1996	"Workin' It Out"	50	—	56	Daryle Singletary
1996	"Amen Kind of Love"	2	—	2	All Because of You
1997	"The Used to Be's"	48	—	85	All Because of You
1997	"Even the Wind"	68	—	—	All Because of You
1997	"The Note"	28	90	70	Ain't It the Truth
1998	"That's Where You're Wrong"	49	—	—	Ain't It the Truth
1998	"My Baby's Lovin'"	44	—	88	Ain't It the Truth
2000	"I Knew I Loved You"	55	—	—	Now and Again
2000	"I've Thought of Everything"	70	—	—	Now and Again
2001	"Now and Again"	—	—	—	Now and Again
2002	"That's Why I Sing This Way"	47	—	—	That's Why I Sing This Way
2002	"I'd Love to Lay You Down"	43	—	—	That's Why I Sing This Way
2007	"I Still Sing This Way"	—	—	—	Straight from the Heart
2007	"Jesus & Bartenders"	—	—	—	Straight from the Heart
2009	"Love You With the Lights On"	—	—	—	Rockin' in the Country
2015	"Spilled Whiskey"	—	—	—	There's Still a Little Country Left
2016	"We're Not Going to Hell for Having a Hell of a Time"	—	—	—	—N/a
2017	"One" (with Rhonda Vincent)	—	—	—	American Grandstand
2018	"She's Been Cheatin' On Us"	—	—	—	—N/a
"—" denotes releases that did not chart

=== Music videos ===
Year	Video	Director
1995	"I'm Living Up to Her Low Expectations"	Planet Pictures/Scene Three
1995	"I Let Her Lie"	Steven T. Miller/R. Brad Murano
1995	"Too Much Fun"	Steven T. Miller/R. Brad Murano
1996	"Workin' It Out"	Jeffrey Phillips
1996	"Amen Kind of Love"	Jeffrey Phillips
1997	"The Used to Be's"	Marc Ball
1997	"The Note"	Jim Hershleder
2000	"I Knew I Loved You"	David McClister
