= Country Standard Time =

Website dedicated to country music

- Editor: Jeffrey B. Remz
- Categories: Music magazine
- Publisher: Jeffrey B. Remz
- Founder: Jeffrey B. Remz
- Founded: 1993
- Final issue: January 2009 (print)
- Country: United States
- Based in: Newton Centre, Massachusetts
- Language: English
- Website: countrystandardtime.com
- OCLC: 190760123

Country Standard Time is a website dedicated to country music and related genres including Americana, bluegrass and rockabilly. It provides news and musical reviews pertaining to the genre. It was established in 1993 by Jeffrey B. Remz as a print magazine, which was first published only in New England but went nationwide in 1995. The magazine has had a website since 1997, and ended its print publication in January 2009.

The web site has features, news and CD, concert and book reviews and attracts about 50,000 page views per month.
