= Keith Whitley discography =

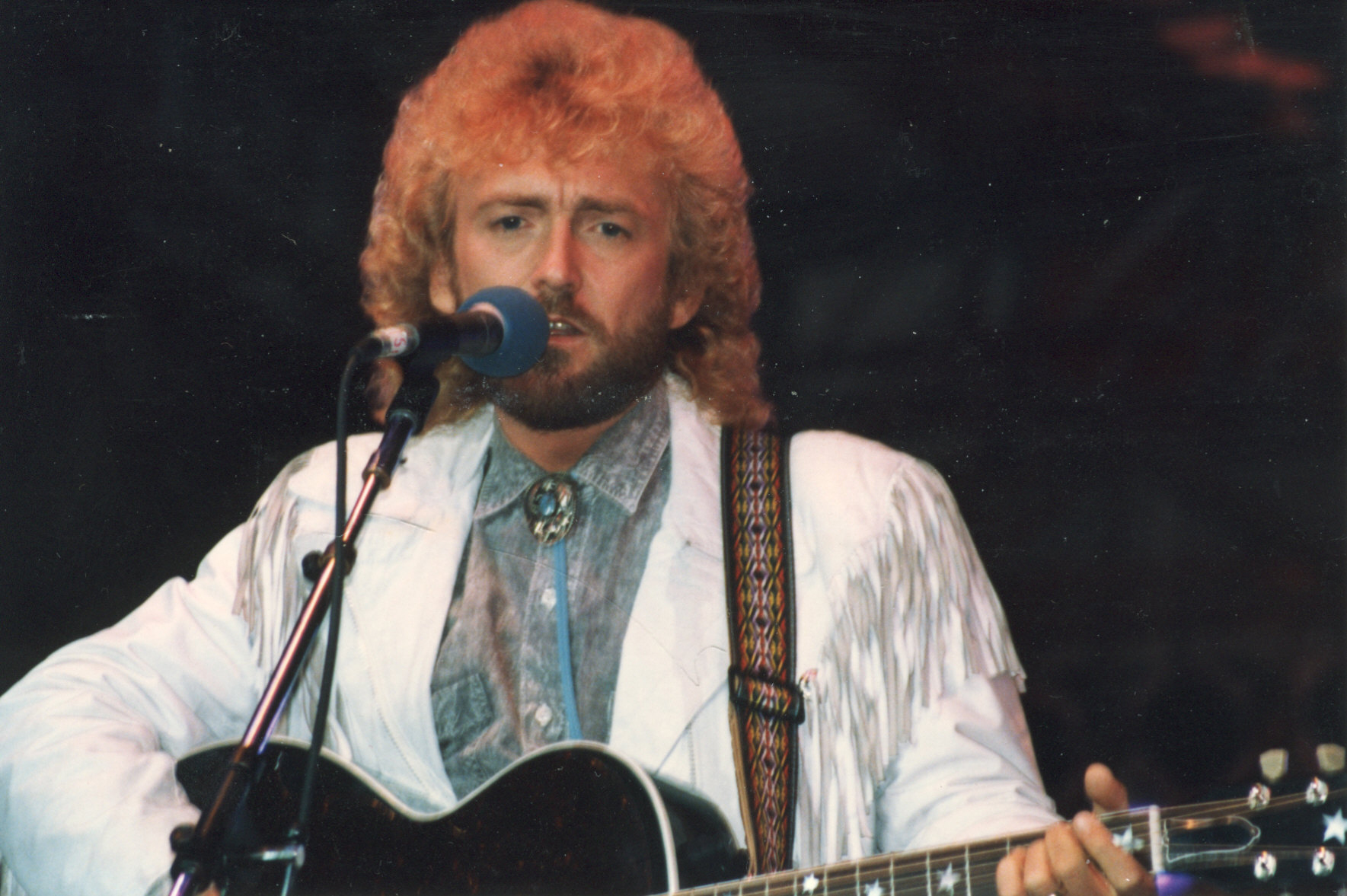
- Whitley performing in June 1988
- Studio albums: 5
- EPs: 1
- Compilation albums: 10
- Tribute albums: 1
- Singles: 20
- Music videos: 7

The discography of American country music singer Keith Whitley includes five studio albums, 10 compilation albums, one extended play and 20 singles. Of his singles, 15 reached the top 40 of the Billboard Hot Country Songs chart between 1986 and 1992, including five number one hits ("Don't Close Your Eyes", "When You Say Nothing at All", "I'm No Stranger to the Rain", "I Wonder Do You Think of Me" and "It Ain't Nothin'"). Four of his albums have been certified Gold or Platinum by the RIAA in the U.S.

== Studio albums ==
Title	Album details	Peak positions			Certifications
Title	Album details	US Country	US	CAN Country	Certifications
L.A. to Miami	Release date: October 28, 1985; Label: RCA Records	26	—	—	
Don't Close Your Eyes	Release date: May 31, 1988; Label: RCA Records	8	121	10	RIAA: Platinum
I Wonder Do You Think of Me	Release date: August 1, 1989; Label: RCA Records	2	115	—	RIAA: Gold
Wherever You Are Tonight	Release date: October 24, 1995; Label: BNA Records	—	—	—	
Sad Songs & Waltzes	Release date: September 12, 2000; Label: Rounder Records	—	—		
"—" denotes releases that did not chart

== Compilation albums ==
Title	Album details	Peak positions			Certifications
Title	Album details	US Country	US	CAN Country	Certifications
Greatest Hits	Release date: August 7, 1990; Label: RCA Records	5	67	—	RIAA: Platinum; MC: Gold
Kentucky Bluebird	Release date: September 10, 1991; Label: RCA Records	45	—	17	
The Best of Keith Whitley	Release date: June 22, 1993; Label: RCA Records	—	—	—	
Super Hits	Release date: May 21, 1996; Label: RCA Records	51	—	—	RIAA: Gold
The Essential Keith Whitley	Release date: June 18, 1996; Label: RCA Records	—	—	—	
Keith Whitley Remembered: The Encore Collection	Release date: April 14, 1998; Label: BMG Special Products	—	—	—	
RCA Country Legends	Release date: March 5, 2002; Label: BMG Heritage Records	—	—	—	
Platinum and Gold Collection	Release date: September 9, 2003; Label: BMG Heritage Records	—	—	—	
16 Biggest Hits	Release date: April 11, 2006; Label: Legacy Recordings	—	—	—	
Country	Release date: March 5, 2013; Label: Sony Music Entertainment	49	—	—	
"—" denotes releases that did not chart

== Tribute albums ==
Title	Album details	Peak positions		Certifications
Title	Album details	US Country	CAN Country	Certifications
Keith Whitley: A Tribute Album	Release date: September 27, 1994; Label: BNA Records	29	19	RIAA: Gold

== Extended plays ==
Title	Album details
A Hard Act to Follow	Release date: October 1, 1984; Label: RCA Records

== Singles ==
Year	Single	Peak positions		Sales	Album
Year	Single	US Country	CAN Country	Sales	Album
1984	"Turn Me to Love"	51	57		A Hard Act to Follow
1984	"Don't Our Love Look Natural"	—	—		A Hard Act to Follow
1985	"A Hard Act to Follow"	76	—		A Hard Act to Follow
1985	"I've Got the Heart for You"	57	—		L.A. to Miami
1985	"Miami, My Amy"	14	38		L.A. to Miami
1986	"Ten Feet Away"	9	16		L.A. to Miami
1986	"Homecoming '63"	9	25		L.A. to Miami
1987	"Hard Livin'"	10	—		L.A. to Miami
1987	"Would These Arms Be in Your Way"	36	—		Don't Close Your Eyes
1987	"Some Old Side Road"	16	32		Don't Close Your Eyes
1988	"Don't Close Your Eyes"	1	2	RIAA: Platinum	Don't Close Your Eyes
1988	"When You Say Nothing at All"	1	1	RIAA: Platinum	Don't Close Your Eyes
1989	"I'm No Stranger to the Rain"	1	1	RIAA: Gold	Don't Close Your Eyes
1989	"I Wonder Do You Think of Me"	1	1		I Wonder Do You Think of Me
1989	"It Ain't Nothin'"	1	1		I Wonder Do You Think of Me
1990	"I'm Over You"	3	3		I Wonder Do You Think of Me
1990	"'Til a Tear Becomes a Rose" (with Lorrie Morgan)	13	13		Greatest Hits
1991	"Brotherly Love" (with Earl Thomas Conley)	2	6		Kentucky Bluebird
1991	"Somebody's Doin' Me Right"	15	12		Kentucky Bluebird
1995	"Wherever You Are Tonight"	75	—		Wherever You Are Tonight
2000	"Sad Songs and Waltzes"	—	—		Sad Songs and Waltzes
"—" denotes releases that did not chart

== Music videos ==
Year	Video	Director
1986	"Homecoming '63"	Arnold Levine
1987	"Hard Livin'"	George Bloom
1988	"Don't Close Your Eyes"	Michael McClary
1988	"Honky Tonk Heart"	
1988	"When You Say Nothing at All"	Stephen Buck
1989	"I'm No Stranger to the Rain"	Stephen Buck
1989	"It Ain't Nothin'"	Ethan Russell
1991	"Brotherly Love" (with Earl Thomas Conley)	Jack Cole
