= Greatest Hits (Keith Whitley album) =

Greatest hits album by Keith Whitley
- Released: August 7, 1990
- Genre: Country
- Length: 38:40
- Label: RCA
- Producer: Garth Fundis; Blake Mevis; Keith Whitley

Keith Whitley chronology
| I Wonder Do You Think of Me (1989) | Greatest Hits (1990) | Kentucky Bluebird (1991) |

Singles from Greatest Hits
- 1. "'Til a Tear Becomes a Rose" Released: July 1990

Professional ratings
Review scores
| Source | Rating |
|---|---|
| AllMusic | 5/5 stars |

Greatest Hits is American country music artist Keith Whitley's first compilation album, released a year after his death. It was released in 1990 by RCA Records. It peaked at No. 5 on the Top Country Albums chart, and was certified platinum by the RIAA. One single was released from it: "'Til a Tear Becomes a Rose", an overdubbed duet with his widow, Lorrie Morgan. It reached No. 13 on the Billboard Hot Country Singles & Tracks chart. The album was certified platinum by the RIAA on June 24, 1993. It has sold 991,900 copies in the United States as of October 2019.

== Track listing ==
| No. | Title | Writer(s) | Length |
|---|---|---|---|
| 1. | "Don't Close Your Eyes" | Bob McDill | 4:10 |
| 2. | "I'm No Stranger to the Rain" | Sonny Curtis; Ron Hellard | 3:34 |
| 3. | "Miami, My Amy" | Hank Cochran; Dean Dillon; Royce Porter | 3:27 |
| 4. | "When You Say Nothing at All" | Paul Overstreet; Don Schlitz | 3:41 |
| 5. | "It Ain't Nothin'" | Tony Haselden | 4:05 |
| 6. | "I'm Over You" | Tim Nichols; Zack Turner | 3:01 |
| 7. | "I Wonder Do You Think of Me" | Sanger D. Shafer | 3:16 |
| 8. | "Ten Feet Away" | Max D. Barnes; Troy Seals; Billy Sherrill | 3:23 |
| 9. | "Talk to Me Texas" | Don Cook; Bucky Jones; Curly Putman | 3:32 |
| 10. | "'Til a Tear Becomes a Rose" (duet with Lorrie Morgan) | Bill Rice; Sharon Vaughn | 3:30 |
| 11. | "Tell Lorrie I Love Her" | Ben Raleigh; Jeff Barry; Keith Whitley | 3:01 |

== Charts ==
=== Weekly charts ===
| Chart (1990) | Peak position |
|---|---|
| US Billboard 200 | 67 |
| US Top Country Albums (Billboard) | 5 |

=== Year-end charts ===
| Chart (1990) | Position |
|---|---|
| US Top Country Albums (Billboard) | 58 |
| Chart (1991) | Position |
| US Top Country Albums (Billboard) | 19 |
