= Kentucky Bluebird =

Compilation album by Keith Whitley
- Released: September 10, 1991
- Genre: Country
- Length: 39:54
- Label: RCA Records
- Producer: Kix Brooks; Don Cook; Garth Fundis; Fred Koller; Blake Mevis; Keith Whitley

Keith Whitley chronology
Greatest Hits (1990)	Kentucky Bluebird (1991)	Wherever You Are Tonight (1995)

Singles from Kentucky Bluebird
- 1. "Brotherly Love" Released: August 26, 1991; 2. "Somebody's Doin' Me Right" Released: January 3, 1992

Kentucky Bluebird is the second compilation album by American country music singer Keith Whitley. His second posthumous album, it was released by RCA Records in September 1991. The album consists of four previously released songs, re-orchestrated demos, and other previously unreleased songs, as well as snippets from live performances that predate his professional music career.

== Content ==
The album features several snippets from various points at Whitley's career, including: a performance that he gave at age eight on Buddy Starcher's television show in Charleston, West Virginia; a radio show performance given as a member of the Lonesome Mountain Boys in 1971; two interviews from the radio countdown show American Country Countdown (then hosted by Bob Kingsley); and an interview with Ralph Emery. Also included are "Lucky Dog" and "Would These Arms Be in Your Way", both of which were included on only the compact disc release of his 1988 album Don't Close Your Eyes, as well as "I Never Go Around Mirrors" from that album and "Between an Old Memory and Me" from 1989's I Wonder Do You Think of Me. These latter two songs were added because they were among Whitley's favorite songs that he recorded. Three of the new songs — "Backbone Job", "I Want My Rib Back" and the title track — had already been recorded by Whitley as demos, with new musical accompaniment added by producer Garth Fundis. The rest of the songs on the album were to have been included on an album that was never released. Kenny Chesney later recorded "I Want My Rib Back" on his 1994 debut album In My Wildest Dreams, "Brotherly Love" was originally a single for Moe Bandy in 1989, and Wade Hayes covered the title track on his 1995 debut album Old Enough to Know Better. Glen Campbell had previously recorded "Somebody's Doin' Me Right" on his 1991 album Unconditional Love.

Of the new material on Kentucky Bluebird, two songs were released as singles: "Brotherly Love", a duet with Earl Thomas Conley, and "Somebody's Doin' Me Right". Respectively, these reached numbers two and 15 on the U.S. Billboard Hot Country Singles & Tracks (now Hot Country Songs) charts, with the latter becoming Whitley's last top 40 country hit. The album itself peaked at number 45 on Top Country Albums.

== Critical reception ==
Alanna Nash of Entertainment Weekly gave the album an A rating, saying that while it did not function as a greatest hits album, it "contain[s] some of Whitley's best moments on record[…] paired here with crisp new instrumental backings". AllMusic critic Al Campbell gave it three stars out of five, calling the album "a documentary of sorts" and "definitely not a first-purchase disc, but a recommended curio".

== Track listing ==
1. Buddy Starcher Show (from Charleston, West Virginia, ca. 1962) – 0:56
2. "Going Home" (Troy Seals, John Schneider) – 4:00
3. "Lucky Dog" (Verlon Thompson, Bill Caswell) – 2:00
4. "That's Where I Want to Take Our Love" (Hank Cochran, Dean Dillon) – 3:13
5. "Somebody's Doin' Me Right" (J. Fred Knobloch, Paul Overstreet, Dan Tyler) – 3:50
6. American Country Countdown interview excerpt – 0:33
7. "I Never Go Around Mirrors" (Sanger D. Shafer, Lefty Frizzell) – 4:24
8. Lonesome Mountain Boys Radio Show, circa 1972 / American Country Countdown interview excerpts – 1:10
9. "Brotherly Love" (Jimmy Alan Stewart, Tim Nichols) – 3:19
  - duet with Earl Thomas Conley
10. "Backbone Job" (Keith Whitley, Kix Brooks) – 2:42
11. "Would These Arms Be in Your Way" (Cochran, Vern Gosdin, Red Lane) – 3:10
12. "Between an Old Memory and Me" (Charlie Craig, Keith Stegall) – 3:18
13. Ralph Emery interview excerpt, January 1989 – 0:43
14. "I Want My Rib Back" (Whitley, Fred Koller) – 3:38
15. "Kentucky Bluebird" (Don Cook, Wally Wilson) – 3:38

== Production ==
As listed in liner notes.

- "Going Home", "That's Where I Want to Take Our Love", "Somebody's Doing Me Right", "Brotherly Love" originally produced by Blake Mevis; additional recording produced by Garth Fundis
- "Lucky Dog", "I Never Go Around Mirrors", "Between an Old Memory and Me" produced by Garth Fundis and Keith Whitley
- "Backbone Job" produced by Kix Brooks and Keith Whitley; additional recording produced by Garth Fundis
- "Would These Arms Be in Your Way" produced by Blake Mevis
- "I Want My Rib Back" produced by Fred Koller and Keith Whitley; additional recording produced by Garth Fundis
- "Kentucky Bluebird" produced by Don Cook; additional recording produced by Garth Fundis

== Personnel ==
As listed in liner notes.

- Eddie Bayers – drums
- Sam Bush – mandolin
- Mark Casstevens – acoustic guitar
- Earl Thomas Conley – duet vocals on "Brotherly Love"
- Carson Chamberlain – Dobro, harmonica
- Paul Franklin – steel guitar, Pedabro
- Allen Frizzell – background vocals
- Sonny Garrish – steel guitar
- Vern Gosdin – background vocals
- Rob Hajacos – fiddle
- Emmylou Harris – background vocals
- Randy Hayes – background vocals
- Mitch Humphries – keyboards
- Jerry Kroon – drums
- Red Lane – acoustic guitar
- Brent Mason – electric guitar
- Mac McAnally – acoustic guitar
- Larry Paxton – bass guitar
- Dave Pomeroy – bass guitar, upright bass
- Gary Prim – keyboards
- Ricky Ray Rector – acoustic guitar, electric guitar
- Matt Rollings – piano
- Brent Rowan – gut string guitar, acoustic guitar, electric guitar
- Bruce Rutherford – background vocals
- Billy Sanford – gut string guitar, acoustic guitar, electric guitar
- Keith Whitley – lead vocals
- Dennis Wilson – background vocals
- Wally Wilson – organ
- Curtis Young – background vocals

== Chart performance ==
Chart (1991)	Peak position
U.S. Billboard Top Country Albums	45
Canadian RPM Country Albums	17
