= Keith Whitley: A Tribute Album =

Studio album by Various artists
- Released: September 27, 1994
- Genre: Country
- Length: 48:36
- Label: BNA
- Producer: Blake Mevis; Randy Scruggs

Keith Whitley: A Tribute Album is a tribute album to American country music singer Keith Whitley. It was released in 1994 via BNA Records.

== Content ==
The album includes renditions of Keith Whitley's songs by various country music artists, as well as an original composition called "Little Boy Lost", co-written and performed by Daron Norwood. The album also contains four previously unreleased Whitley demos from 1984 that were enhanced by the album's producer, Blake Melvin. The four songs are "I'm Gonna Hurt Her on the Radio", "Charlotte's in North Carolina", "The Comeback Kid", and "I Just Want You" (on which his widow, Lorrie Morgan, was dubbed in as a duet partner). The final track, "A Voice Still Rings True", is another original composition written for the album and performed by the "All-Star Band", which featured John Anderson, Steve Wariner, Sawyer Brown, Joe Diffie, and Ricky Skaggs on lead vocals, with backing vocals including Tanya Tucker, Mark Collie, T. Graham Brown, Deborah Allen, Rhonda Vincent, Dean Dillon, Turner Nichols, Earl Thomas Conley, Larry Cordle, and Ken Mellons.

Alison Krauss's rendition of "When You Say Nothing at All" was released as a single from the album in 1995.

== Critical reception ==
An uncredited review in AllMusic gave the album 4 stars out of 5, praising the performances of Alan Jackson, Diamond Rio, Alison Krauss, and Joe Diffie in particular. People also reviewed the album favorably, with an also uncredited review saying that "But while the artists paying their respects do their best to capture the spirit of Whitley's originals, it is the four previously unreleased cuts sung by the man himself…that ultimately prove to be the most satisfying". Alanna Nash of Entertainment Weekly was less favorable, saying that "only Morgan and [Mark] Chesnutt match Whitley's pained intensity" and giving the album a "C+".

== Track listing ==
No.	Title	Writer(s)	Performer	Length
1.	"Don't Close Your Eyes"	Bob McDill	Alan Jackson	4:14
2.	"Ten Feet Away"	Billy Sherrill; Max D. Barnes; Troy Seals	Diamond Rio	3:28
3.	"I'm Gonna Hurt Her on the Radio"	Mac McAnally; Tom Brasfield	Keith Whitley	2:58
4.	"I'm Over You"	Tim Nichols; Zack Turner	Tracy Lawrence	3:09
5.	"When You Say Nothing at All"	Paul Overstreet; Don Schlitz	Alison Krauss and Union Station	4:21
6.	"Charlotte's in North Carolina"	Dean Dillon; Blake Mevis; Kent Robbins; David Wills	Keith Whitley	2:59
7.	"I Just Want You"	Barnes; Seals	Keith Whitley and Lorrie Morgan	3:31
8.	"Little Boy Lost"	Daron Norwood; Wayne Perry	Daron Norwood	4:44
9.	"All I Ever Loved Was You"	Dorothy Skaggs	Shenandoah and Ricky Skaggs	3:52
10.	"I'm No Stranger to the Rain"	Sonny Curtis; Ron Hellard	Joe Diffie	3:33
11.	"I Never Go Around Mirrors (I've Got a Heartache to Hide)"	Lefty Frizzell; Sanger D. Shafer	Mark Chesnutt	4:22
12.	"The Comeback Kid"	Hank Cochran; Dillon	Keith Whitley	3:33
13.	"A Voice Still Rings True"	Larry Cordle; Randy Scruggs	All-Star Band	3:52

== Chart performance ==
=== Weekly charts ===
Chart (1994–95)	Peak position
Canadian Country Albums (RPM)	19
US Top Country Albums (Billboard)	29

=== Year-end charts ===
Chart (1995)	Position
US Top Country Albums (Billboard)	69

== Certifications ==
Region	Certification	Certified units/sales
United States (RIAA)	Gold	500,000^{^}
^{^} Shipments figures based on certification alone.
