= It Ain't Nothin' =

Single by Keith Whitley

from the album I Wonder Do You Think of Me
- B-side: "Heartbreak Highway"
- Released: October 1989
- Recorded: Early 1989
- Genre: Country
- Length: 4:03
- Label: RCA
- Songwriter: Tony Haselden
- Producers: Garth Fundis; Keith Whitley

Keith Whitley singles chronology
"I Wonder Do You Think of Me" (1989)	"It Ain't Nothin'" (1989)	"I'm Over You" (1990)

"It Ain't Nothin'" is a song written by Tony Haselden, the long-time guitarist with the band Louisiana's LeRoux, and recorded by American country music artist Keith Whitley. It was posthumously released in October 1989 as the second single from the album I Wonder Do You Think of Me. His fifth and last No. 1 on the Billboard Hot Country Singles chart, the song was his second posthumous chart-topper, reaching the top of the chart seven months after his death.

The song spent one week at No. 1 and 17 weeks in the Hot Country Singles chart's top 40.

== Music video ==
A music video was released for the song, and it was directed by Ethan Russell. The music video shows photographs and footage of his souvenirs that define Keith Whitley's life in a sliding effect, including photos and footage of Lorrie Morgan, as well as clips from Whitley's previous videos, including 1986's "Homecoming '63", 1987's "Hard Livin'", 1988's "When You Say Nothing at All", and 1989's "I'm No Stranger to the Rain".

== Chart performance ==
Chart (1989–1990)	Peak position
Canada Country Singles (RPM)	1
US Hot Country Songs (Billboard)	1

=== Year-end charts ===
Chart (1990)	Position
Canada Country Tracks (RPM)	28
US Country Songs (Billboard)	40
