= 24th TNN/Music City News Country Awards =

US country music awards ceremony in 1990

- Date: June 4, 1990
- Location: Grand Ole Opry House, Nashville, Tennessee
- Hosted by: Jimmy Dean; Barbara Mandrell

Highlights
- Most wins: Clint Black; Ricky Van Shelton; The Statlers; Hank Williams; Hank Williams Jr. (2 each)
- Most nominations: Randy Travis (5)

Television/radio coverage
- Network: TNN

The 24th TNN/Music City News Country Awards was held on June 4, 1990, at the Grand Ole Opry House, in Nashville, Tennessee. The ceremony was hosted by Jimmy Dean and Barbara Mandrell.

== Winners and nominees ==
Winners are shown in bold.

Entertainer of the Year	Album of the Year
**Ricky Van Shelton**; Alabama; The Statlers; George Strait; Randy Travis	**Killin' Time — Clint Black**; Alone — Vern Gosdin; Beyond the Blue Neon — George Strait; I Wonder Do You Think of Me — Keith Whitley; No Holdin' Back — Randy Travis
Female Artist of the Year	Male Artist of the Year
**Patty Loveless**; Kathy Mattea; Reba McEntire; Lorrie Morgan; Tanya Tucker	**Ricky Van Shelton**; Clint Black; Rodney Crowell; George Strait; Randy Travis
Vocal Group of the Year	Vocal Duo of the Year
**The Statlers**; Alabama; Highway 101; Oak Ridge Boys; Shenandoah	**The Judds**; Baillie and the Boys; Bellamy Brothers; The Everly Brothers; Sweethearts of the Rodeo
Single of the Year	Video of the Year
"**More Than a Name on a Wall**" — **The Statlers**; "After All This Time" — Rodney Crowell; "I'm No Stranger to the Rain" — Keith Whitley; "It's Just a Matter of Time" — Randy Travis; "Living Proof" — Ricky Van Shelton	**"There's a Tear in My Beer"** — **Hank Williams** **and** **Hank Williams Jr.**; "Dear Me" — Lorrie Morgan; "It's Just a Matter of Time" — Randy Travis; "That Just About Does It" — Vern Gosdin; "Why'd You Come in Here Lookin' Like That" — Dolly Parton
Star of Tomorrow	Vocal Collaboration of the Year
**Clint Black**; Garth Brooks; Skip Ewing; Lorrie Morgan; Paul Overstreet	**Hank Williams** **and** **Hank Williams Jr.**; Patrick Swayze and Larry Gatlin; Shelby Lynne and George Jones; Kenny Rogers and Anne Murray; Sharon White and Ricky Skaggs
Gospel Act of the Year	Comedian of the Year
**The Chuck Wagon Gang**; The Cathedrals; Cumberland Boys; Fox Brothers; J.D. Sumner and the Stamps	**Ray Stevens**; Andy Andrews; Jerry Clower; Shotgun Red; Williams and Ree
Instrumentalist of the Year
**Ricky Skaggs**; Chet Atkins; Roy Clark; Charlie Daniels; Mike Snider
Living Legend Award
**Merle Haggard**
Minnie Pearl Award
**Tennessee Ernie Ford**

== See also ==
- CMT Music Awards
