= I'm Gonna Hurt Her on the Radio =

1985 song performed by David Allan Coe

Single by David Allan Coe

from the album Unchained
- B-side: "He Has to Pay (For What I Get for Free)"
- Released: November 2, 1985
- Genre: Country
- Length: 2:38
- Label: Columbia Nashville
- Songwriters: Mac McAnally, Tom Brasfield
- Producer: Billy Sherrill

David Allan Coe singles chronology
"My Elusive Dreams" (1985)	"I'm Gonna Hurt Her on the Radio" (1985)	"A Country Boy Who Rolled the Rock Away" (1986)

"I'm Gonna Love Her on the Radio"

Single by Charley Pride

from the album I'm Gonna Love Her on the Radio
- B-side: "Shouldn't It Be Easier Than This"
- Released: May 7, 1988
- Genre: Country
- Length: 2:53
- Label: 16th Avenue
- Songwriters: Mac McAnally, Tom Brasfield
- Producers: Jerry Bradley, Charley Pride

Charley Pride singles chronology
"Shouldn't It Be Easier Than This" (1987)	"I'm Gonna Love Her on the Radio" (1988)	"Where Was I" (1988)

"I'm Gonna Hurt Her on the Radio" is a song written by Mac McAnally and Tom Brasfield. The song was first recorded by Keith Whitley in 1984, but went unreleased until five years after his death in 1994 on the Keith Whitley: A Tribute Album. The first release of the song was by The Bellamy Brothers on their 1985 album Howard & David, and then shortly thereafter by David Allan Coe on his 1985 album Unchained. Coe's version went to number 52 on the Hot Country Singles & Tracks chart that year.

The most successful version of the song was recorded by American country music artist Charley Pride as "I'm Gonna Love Her on the Radio". and released in May 1988 as the second single and title track from the album I'm Gonna Love Her on the Radio. Pride's single reached number 13 on the same chart.

Shenandoah also released a version on their 1987 self-titled debut album.

== Chart performance ==
=== David Allan Coe ===
Chart (1985)	Peak position
US Hot Country Songs (Billboard)	52

=== Charley Pride ===
Chart (1988)	Peak position
US Hot Country Songs (Billboard)	13
Canadian RPM Country Tracks	33
