= Amy's Eyes (song) =

Single by Charley Pride

from the album Moody Woman
- A-side: "I Made Love to You in My Mind"
- Released: December 1989
- Recorded: September 1988
- Genre: Country
- Length: 3:00
- Label: 16th Avenue
- Songwriters: Terry Brown; Jaima Prater Hunt
- Producers: Jerry Bradley; Charley Pride

Charley Pride singles chronology
| "The More I Do" (1989) | "Amy's Eyes" (1989) | "Moody Woman" (1990) |

"Amy's Eyes" is a song written by Terry Brown and Jaima Prater Hunt, and recorded by American country music artist Charley Pride. It was released in December 1989 as the third single from the album Moody Woman. The song became the final top 40 hit of Pride's career.

== Background and content ==
Charley Pride left his long time label (RCA Records) after 20 years due to frustrations with marketing and promotion of younger artists. In 1987, he signed with 16th Avenue Records and had a series of hits, including the top five, "Shouldn't It Be Easier Than This." Following this he recorded the album, Moody Woman for the label, which spawned the single "Amy's Eyes." The song was recorded in September 1988. The session was produced by Jerry Bradley, whom Pride had been working with for several years up to that point. Pride also co-produced the song.

== Release and reception ==
"Amy's Eyes" was released as a single via 16th Avenue Records in December 1989. The song spent 17 weeks on the Billboard Hot Country Songs chart and peaked at number 28 on the list in January 1990. It was Pride's final charting single on the Billboard country songs chart, yet he would continue releasing singles. The song also became a top 40 hit on the Canadian RPM Country Singles chart when it peaked at number 32. It was also released on Pride's 1989 studio album, Moody Woman.

== Track listings ==
7" vinyl single

- "Amy's Eyes" – 3:00
- "I Made Love to You in My Mind" – 3:08

== Chart performance ==
| Chart (1989) | Peak position |
|---|---|
| Canada Country Songs (RPM) | 32 |
| US Hot Country Songs (Billboard) | 28 |
