= Have I Got Some Blues for You =

Single by Charley Pride

from the album After All This Time
- B-side: "Even Knowin'"
- Released: March 21, 1987
- Genre: Country
- Length: 3:09
- Label: 16th Avenue
- Songwriter(s): David Chamberlain
- Producer(s): Jerry Bradley, Charley Pride

Charley Pride singles chronology
"Love on a Blue Rainy Day" (1986)	"Have I Got Some Blues for You" (1987)	"If You Still Want a Fool Around" (1987)

"Have I Got Some Blues for You" is a song recorded by American country music artist Charley Pride. It was released in March 1987 as the first single from the album After All This Time. The song reached #14 on the Billboard Hot Country Singles & Tracks chart. The song was written by David Chamberlain.

== Chart performance ==
Chart (1987)	Peak position
US Hot Country Songs (Billboard)	14
Canadian RPM Country Tracks	50
