= Miami (Morgan Wallen song) =

2025 song by Morgan Wallen

Song by Morgan Wallen

from the album I'm the Problem
- Released: May 16, 2025
- Length: 3:25
- Label: Big Loud; Republic; Mercury
- Songwriters: Morgan Wallen; Ryan Vojtesak; Ernest Smith; Michael Hardy; Blake Pendergrass; Chase McGill; Dean Dillon; Hank Cochran; Royce Porter
- Producers: Charlie Handsome; Joey Moi

Lyric video
- "Miami" on YouTube

"Miami" is a song by American country music singer Morgan Wallen from his fourth studio album I'm the Problem (2025). It contains an interpolation of "Miami, My Amy" by Keith Whitley and was produced by Charlie Handsome and Joey Moi. An official remix of the song featuring American rappers Lil Wayne and Rick Ross was released on July 25, 2025.

== Background ==
The song was first teased during Morgan Wallen's interview on Theo Von's This Past Weekend podcast. Wallen revealed that rapper BigXthaPlug was originally planned to be featured on the second verse of the song, but he never finished his verse in time so Wallen wrote another verse with his team. He described this "Miami, My Amy" interpolation as "spur-of-the-moment" and said:

We flipped it...it's a little more like a rap style, but it's cool, man. I like it. It seemed like it could use a rapper on there, I didn't end up using a feature, we ended up just making a second verse, but it's one of those songs where it wouldn't be surprising if we got like a remix and did that...Once it's out, and all that stuff.

In May 2025, Wallen provided his commentary on the interpolation in an interview with Kelleigh Bannen for Apple Music's Today Country. He stated that he considered Keith Whitley the greatest vocalist in country music and related to the heartbreak in his music, adding:

Obviously, it seems like he was in a lot of pain, and I seem to empathize with people like that. And then you throw his vocal, and those songs, on top of it, it's just incredible. You said something about "Miami", I already know I'm gonna get crucified for that song, but I don't know… it is fun, and I enjoyed it, and me and the boys writing it had a good time writing it. In my own way, I'm not gonna do a Keith Whitley cover, probably. I don't feel right doing that… this is my own way of paying my respect. And if that offends people, I don't really care, but I'm gonna assume it will.

== Composition ==
The song contains a trap beat. In the lyrics, Morgan Wallen recounts his trip to Miami, having traveled to avoid the cold weather in Tennessee in January. There, he meets a woman who seems to be from Havana, Cuba and have been drinking Captain Morgan. She begs for him to stay in Miami. In the chorus, Wallen explains that although he has enjoyed her company, he cannot move to Miami as he feels he is not suited to live in such a city, detailing that he would not be able to keep his gun in his truck, see the stars or visit bars where people know his name. Wallen references his song "Sand in My Boots", which tells a similar story. Next, he describes spending a night with her at a nightclub, where he drinks whiskey and dances with her. He plays on the word "outskirts" as he sings about missing the rural environment of his home but still being allured by the woman.

== Critical reception ==
Billboard placed "Miami" at number 37 (last place) in their ranking of the songs from I'm the Problem. Maxim Mower of Holler called the song's incorporation of trap elements "an innovative take on a classic country earworm" and wrote "The layering of Wallen's vocals and the introduction of the rattling 808s give this simmering offering an added sense of verve and swagger". Meaghan Garvey of Pitchfork commented "Delete two-thirds of I'm the Problem, whose back-end filler tracks are not even worth noting (save for the bizarre 'Miami', which sounds like a The-Dream song for the Don't Tread on Me set), and a more interesting album emerges".

== Charts ==
Chart performance for "Miami"
Chart (2025)	Peak position
Canada Hot 100 (Billboard)	80
US Billboard Hot 100	65
US Hot Country Songs (Billboard)	33

== Certifications ==
Region	Certification	Certified units/sales
United States (RIAA)	Gold	500,000^{‡}
^{‡} Sales+streaming figures based on certification alone.

== Remix ==
"Miami"

Promotional single by Morgan Wallen featuring Lil Wayne and Rick Ross
- Released: July 25, 2025
- Genre: Country rap
- Length: 3:37
- Label: Big Loud; Republic; Mercury
- Songwriters: Morgan Wallen; Ryan Vojtesak; Ernest Smith; Michael Hardy; Blake Pendergrass; Chase McGill; Dean Dillon; Hank Cochran; Royce Porter; Dwayne Carter Jr.; William Roberts II
- Producers: Charlie Handsome; Joey Moi

Audio
- "Miami" on YouTube

The official remix was released on July 25, 2025 and features American rappers Lil Wayne and Rick Ross. Morgan Wallen first previewed it as his walkout song during the opening of his July 11 and 12 shows at Hard Rock Stadium in Miami, as part of his I'm The Problem Tour.

On the remix, Lil Wayne performs in Auto-Tuned, melodic vocals for an R&B-style verse. Using a humorous tone, he makes numerous references associated with Miami, name-dropping Refrigerator Perry, Will Smith, Trick Daddy, Uncle Luke, and his ex-girlfriend Trina, whom he claims he almost married. He also details his luxurious lifestyle, such as yacht parties, and declares "I got a target on my wallet, but like Morgan, boy, I'm wildin' in Miami", pronouncing "wildin" like "Wallen". Rick Ross raps about his wealth, such as designer bags, Corvette convertibles and spending time with his partner along the Miami coast, and legacy as a leading figure in hip-hop. In addition, he reflects on his grief upon his father's death and appreciates those who have been loyal to him, stating that he would die for them.

=== Charts ===
==== Weekly charts ====
Weekly chart performance for "Miami"
Chart (2025)	Peak position
Canada Hot 100 (Billboard)	51
Global 200 (Billboard)	65
New Zealand Hot Singles (RMNZ)	12
US Billboard Hot 100	21
US Hot Country Songs (Billboard)	5
US Rhythmic Airplay (Billboard)	21

==== Year-end charts ====
Year-end chart performance for "Miami"
Chart (2025)	Position
US Hot Country Songs (Billboard)	44
