= Moody Woman =

Studio album by Charley Pride
- Released: 1989
- Genre: Country
- Length: 31:57
- Label: 16th Avenue
- Producer: Charley Pride, Jerry Bradley

Charley Pride chronology
I'm Gonna Love Her on the Radio (1988)	Moody Woman (1989)	Best of Charley Pride (1990)

Moody Woman is an album by American country music artist Charley Pride. It was released in 1989 via 16th Avenue Records. The album includes the single "Amy's Eyes". Pride duetted with his son Dion on the cover of "Heaven Help Us All". The album was one of Pride's final commercial successes.

== Critical reception ==
Professional ratings
Review scores
Source	Rating
The Encyclopedia of Popular Music	3/5 stars

The Houston Chronicle wrote: "Pride's up-tempo songs are invariably unconvincing (he always sounds guilty when he's trying to seem cheerful), and his ceaseless ballads become tiresome after a while."

== Track listing ==
No.	Title	Writer(s)	Length
1.	"White Houses"	Johnny Cunningham	3:15
2.	"Can't Stop the Mississippi"	Richard Leigh, Wayland Holyfield	3:04
3.	"You Put It There"	Donny Kees, Jimmy Jay, Richard Ross	2:41
4.	"Sail Away"	Mickey Newbury	2:30
5.	"Moody Woman"	Kees, Jay, Ross	3:18
6.	"Heaven Help Us All" (duet with Dion Pride)	Ronald Miller	3:14
7.	"Amy's Eyes"	Terry Brown, Jaima Prater Hunt	3:00
8.	"After Me, After You"	Gidget Baird, Bill Shore, Byron Gallimore	2:52
9.	"I Made Love to You in My Mind"	Danny Hutchins, Stephen Pride	3:08
10.	"The More I Do"	Baird, Gallimore	3:55

== Chart performance ==
Chart (1989)	Peak position
US Top Country Albums (Billboard)	51
