= If You Still Want a Fool Around =

Single by Charley Pride

from the album After All This Time
- B-side: "You Took Me There"
- Released: July 18, 1987
- Genre: Country
- Length: 3:19
- Label: 16th Avenue
- Songwriter(s): Kent Robbins
- Producer(s): Jerry Bradley, Charley Pride

Charley Pride singles chronology
"Have I Got Some Blues for You" (1987)	"If You Still Want a Fool Around" (1987)	"Shouldn't It Be Easier Than This" (1987)

"If You Still Want a Fool Around" is a song recorded by American country music artist Charley Pride. It was released in July 1987 as the second single from the album After All This Time. The song reached #31 on the Billboard Hot Country Singles & Tracks chart. The song was written by Kent Robbins.

== Chart performance ==
Chart (1987)	Peak position
US Hot Country Songs (Billboard)	31
