= Too Cold at Home =

Studio album by Mark Chesnutt
- Released: September 14, 1990
- Recorded: March 1990
- Studios: Eleven Eleven (Nashville, Tennessee); Javelina (Nashville, Tennessee)
- Genres: Neotraditional country; honky-tonk
- Length: 30:57
- Label: MCA
- Producer: Mark Wright

Mark Chesnutt chronology
Doing My Country Thing (1988)	Too Cold at Home (1990)	Longnecks & Short Stories (1992)

Singles from Too Cold at Home
- 1. "Too Cold at Home" Released: July 16, 1990; 2. "Brother Jukebox" Released: November 26, 1990; 3. "Blame It on Texas" Released: March 19, 1991; 4. "Your Love Is a Miracle" Released: July 1, 1991; 5. "Broken Promise Land" Released: October 1991

Professional ratings
Review scores
Source	Rating
AllMusic	4.5/5 stars
Entertainment Weekly	B

Too Cold at Home is the second studio album by American country music artist Mark Chesnutt, released in 1990 on MCA Records. Certified platinum by the RIAA for sales of one million copies, the album produced five Top Ten singles for Chesnutt on the Billboard Hot Country Songs charts. Chronologically, these singles were "Too Cold at Home" (#3), "Brother Jukebox" (#1), "Blame It on Texas" (#5), "Your Love Is a Miracle" (#3), and "Broken Promise Land" (#10). Two of these singles were previously recorded by other artists: "Broken Promise Land" by Waylon Jennings on his 1985 album Turn the Page and "Brother Jukebox" by Keith Whitley on his 1989 album I Wonder Do You Think of Me, and before that by Don Everly in 1977.

Also featured on this album is the song "Friends in Low Places", which was recorded by Garth Brooks on his 1990 album No Fences. Brooks's rendition of the song, released as a single in late 1990, spent four weeks at Number One that year, and has since become a country classic.

== Track listing ==
No.	Title	Writer(s)	Length
1.	"Too Cold at Home"	Bobby Harden	3:42
2.	"Brother Jukebox"	Paul Craft	3:05
3.	"Blame It on Texas"	Ronnie Rogers; Mark Wright	2:51
4.	"Your Love Is a Miracle"	Bill Kenner; Wright	2:49
5.	"Broken Promise Land"	Bill Rice; Sharon Vaughn	3:06
6.	"Too Good a Memory"	Lewis Anderson; Wright	2:41
7.	"Friends in Low Places"	Earl Bud Lee; Dewayne Blackwell	3:28
8.	"Lucky Man"	Rogers; Wright	3:24
9.	"Hey You There in the Mirror"	Jim Rushing; Herb McCullough	2:51
10.	"Danger at My Door"	Wright	3:15
Total length:			30:57

== Musical style and composition ==
Too Cold at Home has been described as a neotraditional country and honky-tonk album, with elements of Western swing. It has been compared to the musical styles of traditional country artists such as Bob Wills, Merle Haggard, and George Jones, the latter of whom endorsed the album in its liner notes.

== Personnel ==
- Mark Chesnutt – lead vocals
- David Briggs – acoustic piano
- Phil Naish – synthesizers
- Steve Nathan – acoustic piano
- Hargus "Pig" Robbins – acoustic piano
- Matt Rollings – acoustic piano
- Richard Bennett – electric guitars
- Pat Flynn – acoustic guitar
- Brent Rowan – acoustic guitar, electric guitars
- Biff Watson – acoustic guitar
- Bill Kenner – reggae guitar
- Paul Franklin – steel guitar
- Glenn Worf – bass
- Bob Wray – bass
- Owen Hale – drums
- Milton Sledge – drums
- Jerry Carrigan – percussion
- Lynn Peterzell – percussion
- Glen Duncan – fiddle
- Mark O'Connor – fiddle
- Jana King – backing vocals
- Lisa Silver – backing vocals
- Bergen White – backing vocals
- Dennis Wilson – backing vocals
- Mark Wright – backing vocals
- Curtis Young – backing vocals

=== Production ===
- Jimmy Gilmer – executive producer
- Mark Wright – producer
- Warren Peterson – recording (1–8)
- Bob Bullock – recording (9, 10)
- Lynn Peterzell – remixing
- Robert Charles – recording assistant (1–8)
- Mike McCarthy – recording assistant (1–8)
- Rodney Good – recording assistant (9, 10), remix assistant
- Milan Bogdan – digital editing
- Glenn Meadows – mastering
- Masterfonics (Nashville, Tennessee) – editing and mastering location
- Jessie Noble – project coordinator
- Jim Kemp – creative director
- Katherine DeVault – art direction, design
- Mike Rutherford – photography
- The BDM Company – management

== Charts ==
=== Weekly charts ===
Chart (1990–1991)	Peak position
Canadian Country Albums (RPM)	23
US Billboard 200	132
US Top Country Albums (Billboard)	12

=== Year-end charts ===
Chart (1991)	Position
US Top Country Albums (Billboard)	15
Chart (1992)	Position
US Top Country Albums (Billboard)	60
