= I Guess I Just Missed You =

Studio album by Canyon
- Released: May 1988
- Genre: Country
- Label: 16th Avenue
- Producer: Tom Brasfield

Canyon chronology
I Guess I Just Missed You (1988)	Radio Romance (1989)

Singles from I Guess I Just Missed You
- 1. "Overdue" Released: January 1988; 2. "In the Middle of the Night" Released: May 1988; 3. "I Guess I Just Missed You" Released: August 1988; 4. "Love Is on the Line" Released: November 1988

I Guess I Just Missed You is the debut studio album by American country music band Canyon. It was released in May 1988 via 16th Avenue Records. The album produced 4 singles, the highest being "Love Is on the Line," which peaked at number 47 on the Billboard Hot Country Singles chart. The album peaked at number 51 on the Billboard Top Country Albums chart.

== Critical reception ==
Billboard gave the album a review saying "Canyon enthusiastically stakes its claim with this impressive debut."

== Track listing ==
No.	Title	Writer(s)	Length
1.	"I Guess I Just Missed You"	Walt Aldridge, Tom Brasfield	2:42
2.	"In the Middle of the Night"	Mike Geiger, Woody Mullis, Ricky Ray Rector	3:10
3.	"To Make a Long Story Short"	S. Alan Taylor, Geiger, Mullis	2:40
4.	"Overdue"	Robert Byrne, Rick Bowles, Brasfield	2:30
5.	"Everybody Needs to Be Needed"	Steve Bogard, Jeff Tweel	2:47
6.	"Love Is on the Line"	Steve Cooper	3:02
7.	"Room with a View"	Taylor, Brasfield	3:05
8.	"The Rest Are History"	Byrne, Bowles	2:45
9.	"Love Wins"	Geiger, Taylor	2:30
10.	"One Night Could Last Forever"	Dave Loggins, Karen Brooks	3:18

== Personnel ==
Canyon

- Steve Cooper - acoustic guitar, banjo, lead vocals
- Johnny Boatright - guitar, backing vocals
- Randy Russell Rigney - bass, backing vocals
- Keech Rainwater - drums
- J. Ellis Brown - keyboards

Additional musicians

- Mac McAnally - electric guitar, acoustic guitar
- Duncan Cameron - electric guitar, steel guitar
- Owen Hale - drums
- Ralph Ezell - bass
- Bob Wray - bass
- Steve Nathan - keyboards
- John Willis - electric guitar
- Ricky Ray Rector - electric guitar
- Paul Franklin - dobro

Technical

- Pete Green - engineering
- Alan Schulman - engineering
- Bill Harris - engineering
- Gary Paczosa - engineering
- Denny Purcell - mastering
- Tom Brasfield - production

== Chart performance ==
Album

Chart (1988)	Peak position
U.S. Top Country Albums	51

Singles

Year	Single	Peak positions
Year	Single	US Country
1988	"Overdue"	59
1988	"In the Middle of the Night"	54
1988	"I Guess I Just Missed You"	55
1988	"Love Is on the Line"	47
