= I'm Gonna Love Her on the Radio =

Studio album by Charley Pride
- Released: March 1988
- Genre: Country
- Length: 29:37
- Label: 16th Avenue
- Producer: Jerry Bradley

Charley Pride chronology
After All This Time (1987)	I'm Gonna Love Her on the Radio (1988)	Moody Woman (1989)

I'm Gonna Love Her on the Radio is the thirty-sixth studio album by American country music artist Charley Pride. It was released in March 1988 via 16th Avenue Records. The album includes the singles "Shouldn't It Be Easier Than This", "I'm Gonna Love Her on the Radio" and "Where Was I".

== Track listing ==
No.	Title	Writer(s)	Length
1.	"I'm Gonna Love Her on the Radio"	Mac McAnally, Tom Brasfield	2:40
2.	"She's Soft to Touch (But She's Hard to Hold)"	Bob McDill, Jim Weatherly	3:01
3.	"Shouldn't It Be Easier Than This"	John Jarrard, Rick Giles	3:06
4.	"Your Used to Be"	Bill Shore, Byron Gallimore	2:54
5.	"Where Was I"	Steve Clark, Rick Peoples	2:48
6.	"Come On In and Let Me Love You"	Don Scoggins	3:04
7.	"A Whole Lot of Lovin'"	Carol Chase, Shore, Gallimore	3:05
8.	"Leaving Never Gets Me Anywhere"	Randy VanWarmer, Bobby Barker	3:11
9.	"There Ain't No Me (If There Ain't No You)"	Skip Ewing, Max D. Barnes, Patsy Barnes	3:11
10.	"A Little Piece of Heaven"	Ewing, Michael White, Don Sampson	2:37

== Chart performance ==
Chart (1988)	Peak position
US Top Country Albums (Billboard)	36
