= After All This Time (album) =

Studio album by Charley Pride
- Released: March 1987
- Genre: Country
- Length: 30:22
- Label: 16th Avenue
- Producer: Jerry Bradley, Charley Pride

Charley Pride chronology
Back to the Country (1986)	After All This Time (1987)	I'm Gonna Love Her on the Radio (1988)

After All This Time is the thirty-fifth studio album by American country music artist Charley Pride. It was released in March 1987 via 16th Avenue Records. The album includes the singles "Have I Got Some Blues for You" and "If You Still Want a Fool Around".

== Track listing ==
No.	Title	Writer(s)	Length
1.	"Have I Got Some Blues for You"	David Chamberlain	3:07
2.	"Looking at a Sure Thing"	Kent Robbins	2:52
3.	"Even Knowin'"	Dickey Lee, Johnny Russell, Tommy Rocco	2:44
4.	"After All This Time"	Tommy Collins	2:32
5.	"Next to You, I Like Me"	Billy Haynes, Bobby Fischer, Rick Giles	3:11
6.	"If You Still Want a Fool Around"	Robbins	3:17
7.	"On the Other Hand"	Paul Overstreet, Don Schlitz	3:07
8.	"One of These Days"	Ray Charles, Lamont Hawkins, Jason Hunter Corey Woods	2:34
9.	"Look in Your Mirror"	Bill Shore, Byron Gallimore	3:09
10.	"You Took Me There"	Blake Mevis, Shore, Gallimore	3:49

== Chart performance ==
Chart (1987)	Peak position
US Top Country Albums (Billboard)	18
