= Radio Romance =

Radio Romance may refer to:

- Radio Romance (Eddie Rabbitt album), 1982
- Radio Romance (Canyon album), 1989
- "Radio Romance" (song), by Tiffany, 1989
- Radio Romance (TV series), a 2018 South Korean romance series
- Radio Romance (film), a Philippine film of 1996
- MOR Entertainment, originally Radio Romance (1989–1993), a Philippine new media radio service
