= Unconditional Love (Glen Campbell album) =

Studio album by Glen Campbell
- Released: January 7, 1991
- Recorded: 1990
- Studio: Sound Stage Studio, Nashville, TN
- Genre: Country
- Label: Liberty
- Producer: Jimmy Bowen, Jerry Crutchfield

Glen Campbell chronology
Walkin' in the Sun (1990)	Unconditional Love (1991)	Show Me Your Way (1991)

Unconditional Love is the forty-seventh album by American singer/guitarist Glen Campbell, released in 1991 (see 1991 in music). The title track "Unconditional Love" was the first single, reaching No. 27 on the Hot Country Singles chart, while "Living in a House Full of Love" was the second single. The album itself did not chart in the US, but did chart briefly in New Zealand reaching No. 48.

The song "Somebody's Doin' Me Right" was also recorded by Keith Whitley and released posthumously as a single in 1992 from his album Kentucky Bluebird.

== Track listing ==
1. "Unconditional Love" (Donny Lowery, Randy Sharp, Tim DuBois) – 3:18
2. "We Will" (Tony Haselden, Stan Munsey) – 3:06
3. "Right Down to the Memories" (Steve Bogard, Rick Giles) – 3:06
4. "Livin' in a House Full of Love" (Glenn Sutton, Billy Sherrill) – 2:20
5. "Healing Hands of Time" (Willie Nelson) – 2:39
6. "Next to You" (Lowery, Sharp) – 2:58
7. "Somebody's Doin' Me Right" (J. Fred Knobloch, Paul Overstreet, Dan Tyler) – 3:09
8. "I'm Gone This Time" (Carl Jackson) – 2:22
9. "Once a Day" (Bill Anderson) – 2:34
10. "Light of a Clear Blue Morning" (Dolly Parton) – 3:00

== Personnel ==
- Glen Campbell – lead vocals, acoustic guitar, electric guitar, background vocals
- Larry Byrom – acoustic guitar, electric guitar
- Brent Rowan – electric guitar
- Reggie Young – electric guitar
- Carl Jackson – electric guitar
- Patrick Flynn – acoustic guitar
- Michael Rhodes – bass guitar
- Paul Franklin – steel guitar
- Larry Knechtel – piano, synthesizer
- Dave Innis – synthesizer
- Hargus "Pig" Robbins – piano
- Rob Hajacos – fiddle
- James Stroud – drums
- Wayland Patton, Curtis Young, John Cowan, Dennis Wilson, Louis Nunley, Donna McElroy, Carol Chase – background vocals

== Production ==
- Producers – Jimmy Bowen and Jerry Crutchfield
- Engineers – John Guess, Marty Williams
- Overdubs – Bob Bullock, Mark Coddington, Tim Kish, Tom Perry
- Remix engineers – Tom Perry, David Boyer
- Song selection – Ray Pillow
- CD master tape prepared by Glenn Meadows at Masterfonics

== Charts ==
Singles – Billboard (United States)

Year	Single	Hot Country Singles
1991	"Unconditional Love"	27
1991	"Living in a House Full of Love"	70
