= Some Old Side Road =

Single by Keith Whitley

from the album Don't Close Your Eyes
- B-side: "Light at the End of the Tunnel"
- Released: November 2, 1987
- Genre: Country
- Length: 3:25
- Label: RCA
- Songwriter(s): Roger D. Ferris
- Producer(s): Blake Mevis

Keith Whitley singles chronology
"Would These Arms Be in Your Way" (1987)	"Some Old Side Road" (1987)	"Don't Close Your Eyes" (1988)

"Some Old Side Road" is a song written by Roger D. Ferris and recorded by American country music artist Keith Whitley. It was released in November 1987 as the second single from the album Don't Close Your Eyes. The song reached number 16 on the Billboard Hot Country Singles & Tracks chart.

== Chart performance ==
Chart (1987–1988)	Peak position
US Hot Country Songs (Billboard)	16
Canadian RPM Country Tracks	32
