= Blame It on Texas =

Single by Mark Chesnutt

from the album Too Cold at Home
- B-side: "Danger at My Door"
- Released: March 19, 1991
- Recorded: 1990
- Genre: Country
- Length: 2:51
- Label: MCA
- Songwriters: Ronnie Rogers, Mark Wright
- Producer: Mark Wright

Mark Chesnutt singles chronology
"Brother Jukebox" (1990)	"Blame It on Texas" (1991)	"Your Love Is a Miracle" (1991)

"Blame It on Texas" is a song written by Ronnie Rogers and Mark Wright, and recorded by American country music singer Mark Chesnutt. It was released in March 1991 as the third single from his debut album Too Cold at Home. It peaked at #5 in the United States, and #4 in Canada.

== Content ==
The narrator tells that from his humble beginnings in Beaumont, Texas (Chesnutt's birthplace) he has traveled all around the country. He says it's great and all but he still prefers Texas. In the second verse, he describes hooking up with an Oklahoma oil heiress, then leaving her in the middle of the night because he missed home. In each chorus he tells the audience to blame his insanity on Texas, not him.

== Critical reception ==
An uncredited review in Cashbox described the song as "destined to create a little toe-tappin' and finger-snappin' action" with "pure country vocals".

== Chart performance ==
Chart (1991)	Peak position
Canada Country Singles (RPM)	4
US Hot Country Songs (Billboard)	5

=== Year-end charts ===
Chart (1991)	Position
Canada Country Tracks (RPM)	76
US Country Songs (Billboard)	57
