= Shouldn't It Be Easier Than This =

Single by Charley Pride

from the album I'm Gonna Love Her on the Radio
- B-side: "Look in Your Mirror"
- Released: October 1987
- Genre: Country
- Length: 3:12
- Label: 16th Avenue
- Songwriter(s): Rick Giles; John Jarrard
- Producer(s): Jerry Bradley; Charley Pride

Charley Pride singles chronology
"If You Still Want a Fool Around" (1987)	"Shouldn't It Be Easier Than This" (1987)	"I'm Gonna Love Her on the Radio" (1988)

"Shouldn't It Be Easier Than This" is a song written by John Jarrard and Rick Giles, and recorded by American country music artist Charley Pride. It was released in October 1987 as the first single from his album I'm Gonna Love Her on the Radio. The song peaked at No. 5 on the Billboard Hot Country Singles chart. It was Pride's 52nd and final Top 10 hit on Billboard country music charts.

== Charts ==
=== Weekly charts ===
Chart (1987–1988)	Peak position
US Hot Country Songs (Billboard)	5
Canadian RPM Country Tracks	29

=== Year-end charts ===
Chart (1988)	Position
US Hot Country Songs (Billboard)	30
