= Your Love Is a Miracle =

Single by Mark Chesnutt

from the album Too Cold at Home
- B-side: "Too Good a Memory"
- Released: July 1, 1991
- Recorded: 1990
- Genre: Country
- Length: 2:49
- Label: MCA
- Songwriters: Bill Kenner, Mark Wright
- Producer: Mark Wright

Mark Chesnutt singles chronology
"Blame It on Texas" (1991)	"Your Love Is a Miracle" (1991)	"Broken Promise Land" (1991)

"Your Love Is a Miracle" is a song written by Bill Kenner and Mark Wright, and recorded by American country music singer Mark Chesnutt. It was released in July 1991 as the fourth single from his debut album Too Cold at Home. It peaked at number 3 in the United States, and number 2 in Canada in their respective Country Music charts.

== Content ==
The narrator tells his lover that her love is a miracle for ending his rambling-man ways and making him settle down.

== Music video ==
The music video was directed by Bill Young and premiered in mid-1991.

== Chart performance ==
Chart (1991)	Peak position
Canada Country Singles (RPM)	2
US Hot Country Songs (Billboard)	3

=== Year-end charts ===
Chart (1991)	Position
Canada Country Tracks (RPM)	24
US Country Songs (Billboard)	32
