= Canyon (country music band) =

American country music group (1981–1992)

- Origin: Dallas, Texas, USA
- Genres: Country, country pop
- Years active: 1981–1992
- Label: 16th Avenue
- Spinoffs: Lonestar
- Past members: Steve Cooper; Johnny Boatright; J. Ellis Brown; Randy Rigney; Randy Smith; Keech Rainwater; Michael Britt

Canyon was an American country music group composed of Steve Cooper (vocals, guitar), Johnny Boatright (guitar), J. Ellis Brown (keyboards), Randy Rigney (bass) and Keech Rainwater (drums), who replaced Randy Smith, their original drummer. Between 1988 and 1989, the band released two studio albums on 16th Avenue. They also charted nine songs on the Billboard Hot Country Singles & Tracks chart, including the Top 40 single "Hot Nights". Canyon got their big break on the show Star Search with Ed McMahon, where they were the runner up to Sawyer Brown in 1983 for Vocal Band. Boatright was replaced in 1990 by Michael Britt.

They were nominated in 1991 at the Academy of Country Music for Top New Vocal Duo or Group, along with Prairie Oyster and Pirates of the Mississippi, but lost to the Pirates of the Mississippi.

After Canyon disbanded in 1992, Rainwater and Britt joined the group Texassee, who would later change their name to Lonestar.

== Discography ==
=== Albums ===
Year	Album	US Country	Label
1988	I Guess I Just Missed You	51	16th Avenue
1989	Radio Romance	61	16th Avenue

=== Singles ===
Year	Single	Chart positions		Album
Year	Single	US Country	CAN Country	Album
1988	"Overdue"	59	—	I Guess I Just Missed You
1988	"In the Middle of the Night"	54	—	I Guess I Just Missed You
1988	"I Guess I Just Missed You"	55	—	I Guess I Just Missed You
1988	"Love Is on the Line"	47	—	I Guess I Just Missed You
1989	"Right Track, Wrong Train"	44	—	Radio Romance
1989	"Hot Nights"	40	68	Radio Romance
1989	"Radio Romance"	53	—	Radio Romance
1990	"Carryin' On"	74	—	Radio Romance
1990	"Dam These Tears"	71	—	—N/a

=== Music videos ===
Year	Video	Director
1988	"I Guess I Just Missed You"	George Deaton
1989	"Right Track, Wrong Train"	George Deaton
1989	"Hot Nights"	George Deaton
1989	"Radio Romance"	George Deaton
1990	"Carrying On"	Michael Merriman
1990	"Dam These Tears"	Michael Merriman

== Awards and nominations ==
Year	Organization	Award	Nominee/Work	Result
1990	Academy of Country Music Awards	Top New Vocal Group or Duet	Canyon	Shortlisted
1991	Academy of Country Music Awards	Top New Vocal Group or Duet	Canyon	Nominated
