= Broken Promise Land =

1986 song by Bill Rice and Sharon Vaughn

"The Broken Promise Land"

Single by Waylon Jennings

from the album The Best of Waylon
- B-side: "I Don't Have Any More Love Songs"
- Released: December 1986
- Genre: Country
- Length: 3:13
- Label: RCA
- Songwriters: Bill Rice, Sharon Vaughn
- Producers: Jerry Bridges, Gary Scruggs

Waylon Jennings singles chronology
"The Ballad of Forty Dollars" (1986)	"The Broken Promise Land" (1986)	"Rose in Paradise" (1987)

"Broken Promise Land"

Single by Mark Chesnutt

from the album Too Cold at Home
- B-side: "Friends In Low Places"
- Released: October 1991
- Recorded: 1990
- Genre: Country
- Length: 3:06
- Label: MCA
- Songwriters: Bill Rice, Sharon Vaughn
- Producer: Mark Wright

Mark Chesnutt singles chronology
"Your Love Is a Miracle" (1991)	"Broken Promise Land" (1991)	"Old Flames Have New Names" (1992)

"Broken Promise Land" is a song written by Bill Rice and Sharon Vaughn, and recorded by American country music singer Waylon Jennings in 1985 for his album Turn the Page as "The Broken Promise Land". It was released as a single from Jennings' compilation album The Best of Waylon in December 1986. John Schneider recorded a cover of the song, also titled "The Broken Promise Land," on his 1986 album Take The Long Way Home on MCA Records. In 1990, Mark Chesnutt recorded his cover of the song but without "The" in its title. It was Chesnutt's fifth and final single released from his debut album Too Cold at Home. It peaked at number 10 in the United States, and number 7 in Canada in their respective country music charts.

== Content ==
The song begins with the narrator in a motel room with a woman he shouldn't be with. He calls his wife, who believes he's on a business trip, out of guilt and tells her he'll be gone a bit longer. In the chorus the narrator refers to where he's at is called Broken Promise Land. When the narrator returns home, he finds his wife has left, her wedding ring on the floor. He says that she's going to Broken Promise Land as well.

== Chart performance ==
Chart (1991–1992)	Peak position
Canada Country Singles (RPM)	7
US Hot Country Songs (Billboard)	10

=== Year-end charts ===
Chart (1992)	Position
Canada Country Tracks (RPM)	75
