= Radio Romance (Canyon album) =

Studio album by Canyon
- Released: May 1989
- Genre: Country
- Label: 16th Avenue
- Producer: Ron Chancey

Canyon chronology
I Guess I Just Missed You (1988)	Radio Romance (1989)

Singles from Radio Romance
- 1. "Right Track, Wrong Train" Released: April 1989; 2. "Hot Nights" Released: July 1989; 3. "Radio Romance" Released: October 1989; 4. "Carryin' On" Released: March 1990

Professional ratings
Review scores
Source	Rating
AllMusic	2/5 stars

Radio Romance is the second studio album by American country music band Canyon. It was released in May 1989 via 16th Avenue Records. The album produced 4 singles, including the band's only top 40 hit, "Hot Nights", which peaked at number 40 on the Billboard Hot Country Singles chart. The album peaked at number 61 on the Billboard Top Country Albums chart.

== Track listing ==
No.	Title	Writer(s)	Length
1.	"Right Track, Wrong Train"	S. Alan Taylor, Lonnie Wilson	3:29
2.	"She Keeps Me in One Piece"	Dave Loggins	3:30
3.	"Radio Romance"	Reed Nielsen, Monty Powell, Jackie White	3:39
4.	"Louisiana Won't Let Go"	Barbara Rothstein, George Michael Elian, Jesse Turnbow	3:55
5.	"Hitch a Ride"	Tim Phelan	3:14
6.	"Hot Nights"	Fred Knobloch, Jim Weatherly	3:14
7.	"The Way She Said Goodbye"	Carol Chase, Dave Gibson, Paul Nelson	3:26
8.	"Streamline"	Brent Mason, Lewis Anderson	2:55
9.	"Oh, Help Me"	Alan Rush, Dennis Linde	3:40
10.	"Carryin' On"	Bob DiPiero, Gerry House	3:58

== Personnel ==
Canyon

- Steve Cooper - acoustic guitar, lead vocals
- Johnny Boatright - guitar, backing vocals
- Randy Russell Rigney - bass, backing vocals
- Keech Rainwater - drums
- J. Ellis Brown - keyboards

Additional musicians

- Mac McAnally - acoustic guitar
- Roger Hawkins - drums, percussion
- David Hood - bass
- Steve Nathan - keyboards
- Brent Rowan - electric guitar, dobro

Strings on "The Way She Said Goodbye" and "Carryin' On"

- David Davidson
- Conni Ellisor
- Robert Mason
- Laura Molyneaux
- Alan Umstead
- Catherine Umstead
- Gary Vanosdale
- Kris Wilkinson
- Bergen White - arranger

Technical

- Rodney Good - engineering
- Bobby Bradley - engineering
- Vicki Lancaster - engineering
- Carlos Grier - mastering
- Denny Purcell - mastering
- Billy Sherrill - mixing
- Ron Chancey - production

== Chart performance ==
Album

Chart (1989)	Peak position
U.S. Top Country Albums	61

Singles

Year	Single	Peak positions	
Year	Single	US Country	CAN Country
1989	"Right Track, Wrong Train"	44	—
1989	"Hot Nights"	40	68
1989	"Radio Romance"	53	—
1990	"Carryin' On"	74	—
"—" denotes releases that did not chart
