= Somebody's Doin' Me Right =

Single by Keith Whitley

from the album Kentucky Bluebird
- B-side: "Would These Arms Be in Your Way"
- Released: January 3, 1992
- Genre: Country
- Length: 3:50
- Label: RCA
- Songwriters: J. Fred Knobloch; Paul Overstreet; Dan Tyler
- Producers: Blake Mevis; Garth Fundis

Keith Whitley singles chronology
"Brotherly Love" (1991)	"Somebody's Doin' Me Right" (1992)	"Wherever You Are Tonight" (1995)

"Somebody's Doin' Me Right" is a song written by J. Fred Knobloch, Paul Overstreet and Dan Tyler, and recorded by American country music artist Keith Whitley. It was posthumously released in January 1992 as the second single from his album, Kentucky Bluebird, and reached No. 15 on the Billboard Hot Country Singles & Tracks chart.

== Other versions ==
It was previously released by Glen Campbell on his 1991 album Unconditional Love. Before that, S-K-O recorded it on their debut album Schuyler, Knobloch and Overstreet.

== Personnel ==
- Eddie Bayers — drums
- Paul Franklin — steel guitar
- Brent Mason — electric guitar
- Dave Pomeroy — bass guitar
- Billy Sanford — acoustic guitar
- Dennis Wilson — background vocals
- Curtis Young — background vocals

== Chart performance ==
Chart (1992)	Peak position
Canada Country Singles (RPM)	12
US Hot Country Songs (Billboard)	15
