= Too Cold at Home (song) =

Single by Mark Chesnutt

from the album Too Cold at Home
- B-side: "Lucky Man"
- Released: July 16, 1990
- Recorded: March 1990
- Genre: Country
- Length: 3:42
- Label: MCA
- Songwriter: Bobby Harden
- Producer: Mark Wright

Mark Chesnutt singles chronology
"Too Cold at Home" (1990)	"Brother Jukebox" (1990)

"Too Cold at Home" is a song written by Bobby Harden, and recorded by American country music singer Mark Chesnutt. It was released on July 16, 1990, as the lead single from his album of the same name. It peaked at number 3 in the United States, while it was a number-one hit in Canada, on their country music charts.

== Music video ==
The music video was directed by Bill Young. It begins with Chesnutt driving up to a bar and going in, with the radio blasting how hot it is outside. Inside the dead establishment, he reflects on some posters and trophies of the Dodgers (as mentioned in the lyrics) on the wall. It then cuts to him and a full band performing the song to a much livelier and more crowded bar at night. The acting Chesnutt then leaves and passes by his trailer home (which is locked) before driving down the road with the radio blasting the weather again after the song is finished. It was filmed at the Pine Tree Lodge in LaBelle, Texas, and at Cutter's in Beaumont, Texas.

== Chart performance ==
Chart (1990)	Peak position
Canada Country Singles (RPM)	1
US Hot Country Songs (Billboard)	3

=== Year-end charts ===
Chart (1990)	Position
Canada Country Tracks (RPM)	17
US Country Songs (Billboard)	45
