= Brother Jukebox =

Single by Mark Chesnutt

from the album Too Cold at Home
- B-side: "Hey You There in the Mirror"
- Released: November 26, 1990
- Recorded: 1990
- Genre: Country
- Length: 3:05
- Label: MCA
- Songwriter: Paul Craft
- Producer: Mark Wright

Mark Chesnutt singles chronology
"Too Cold at Home" (1990)	"Brother Jukebox" (1990)	"Blame It on Texas" (1991)

"Brother Jukebox" is a song written by Paul Craft. It was originally recorded in 1976 by Don Everly, one-half of The Everly Brothers, and reached number 96 on the country singles charts in 1977. It was later covered by Keith Whitley on I Wonder Do You Think of Me and by Mark Chesnutt on his 1990 debut album Too Cold at Home. Released in November 1990 as the album's second single, it became his first number one country hit in the United States. It was also recorded by John Starling on his 1977 album Long Time Gone.

== Content ==
The song's narrator tells of a man who, after being left by his wife, addresses "brother jukebox", "sister wine", "mother freedom" and "father time" as the only family he has left in his life.

== Music video (Mark Chesnutt) ==
The music video was directed by Bill Young and premiered in late 1990.

== Chart performance ==
=== Don Everly ===
Chart (1977)	Peak position
US Hot Country Songs (Billboard)	96

=== Mark Chesnutt ===
Chart (1990–1991)	Peak position
Canada Country Singles (RPM)	1
US Hot Country Songs (Billboard)	1

==== Year-end charts ====
Chart (1991)	Position
Canada Country Tracks (RPM)	20
US Country Songs (Billboard)	6
