= 'Til a Tear Becomes a Rose =

1990 single by Keith Whitley and Lorrie Morgan

Single by Keith Whitley with Lorrie Morgan

from the album Greatest Hits
- B-side: "Lady's Choice"
- Released: July 1990
- Genre: Country
- Length: 3:29
- Label: RCA
- Songwriters: Bill Rice; Sharon Vaughn
- Producer: Garth Fundis

Keith Whitley singles chronology
"I'm Over You" (1990)	"'Til a Tear Becomes a Rose" (1990)	"Brotherly Love" (1991)

Lorrie Morgan singles chronology
"Five Minutes" (1990)	"'Til a Tear Becomes a Rose" (1990)	"We Both Walk" (1991)

"'Til a Tear Becomes a Rose" is a song originally recorded by American country music artist Leon Everette. It was released in 1985 from his album Where's the Fire. His version of the song peaked at number 44 on Hot Country Songs.

The song was later covered by Keith Whitley as a duet with his wife Lorrie Morgan. Posthumously released in July 1990, it was the only single from his Greatest Hits album. This version peaked at number 13 on the country singles charts and won the Vocal Event of the Year at the Country Music Association awards.

Another version was released in 1990 by Jann Browne on her album Tell Me Why.

John Prine and Fiona Whelan Prine also covered the song for the 1999 album In Spite of Ourselves.

In 2015, a version of the song was released by singer Kevin Moon and bluegrass artist Rhonda Vincent for Moon's Throwback CD.

== Chart performance ==
=== Leon Everette ===
Chart (1985)	Peak position
US Hot Country Songs (Billboard)	44

=== Keith Whitley with Lorrie Morgan ===
Chart (1990)	Peak position
Canada Country Singles (RPM)	13
US Hot Country Songs (Billboard)	13
