= I Wonder Do You Think of Me (song) =

Single by Keith Whitley

from the album I Wonder Do You Think of Me
- B-side: "Brother Jukebox"
- Released: June 1989
- Recorded: April 1989
- Genre: Country
- Length: 3:12
- Label: RCA
- Songwriter: Sanger D. Shafer
- Producers: Garth Fundis; Keith Whitley

Keith Whitley singles chronology
"I'm No Stranger to the Rain" (1989)	"I Wonder Do You Think of Me" (1989)	"It Ain't Nothin'" (1989)

"I Wonder Do You Think of Me" is a song written by Sanger D. Shafer, and recorded by American country music artist Keith Whitley. It was posthumously released in June 1989 as the first single and title track from the album I Wonder Do You Think of Me. The song was Whitley's fourth number one on the country chart. The single went to number one for one week and spent a total of fourteen weeks on the country chart.

== Chart performance ==
Chart (1989)	Peak position
Canada Country Singles (RPM)	1
US Hot Country Songs (Billboard)	1

=== Year-end charts ===
Chart (1989)	Position
Canada Country Tracks (RPM)	80
US Country Songs (Billboard)	14
