= Homecoming '63 =

Single by Keith Whitley

from the album L.A. to Miami
- B-side: "On the Other Hand"
- Released: November 3, 1986
- Genre: Country
- Length: 3:01
- Label: RCA
- Songwriter(s): Dean Dillon; Royce Porter
- Producer(s): Blake Mevis

Keith Whitley singles chronology
"Ten Feet Away" (1986)	"Homecoming '63" (1986)	"Hard Livin'" (1987)

"Homecoming '63" is a song written by Dean Dillon and Royce Porter, and recorded by American country music artist Keith Whitley. It was released in November 1986 as the fourth single from the album L.A. to Miami. The song reached number nine on the Billboard Hot Country Singles & Tracks chart.

== Chart performance ==
"Homecoming '63" debuted at number 61 on the U.S. Billboard Hot Country Singles & Tracks for the week of November 8, 1986.

Chart (1986–1987)	Peak position
US Hot Country Songs (Billboard)	9
Canadian RPM Country Tracks	25
