= Hard Livin' =

Single by Keith Whitley

from the album L.A. to Miami
- B-side: "Quittin' Time"
- Released: March 14, 1987
- Genre: Country
- Length: 2:56
- Label: RCA
- Songwriter(s): David Halley
- Producer(s): Blake Mevis

Keith Whitley singles chronology
"Homecoming '63" (1986)	"Hard Livin'" (1987)	"Would These Arms Be in Your Way" (1987)

"Hard Livin'" is a song written by David Halley, and recorded by American country music artist Keith Whitley. It was released in March 1987 as the fifth single from the album L.A. to Miami. The song reached number 10 on the Billboard Hot Country Singles & Tracks chart.

== Music video ==
The song's music video was directed by George Bloom.

== Chart performance ==
Chart (1987)	Peak position
US Hot Country Songs (Billboard)	10
