= Would These Arms Be in Your Way =

Single by Keith Whitley

from the album Don't Close Your Eyes
- B-side: "Someone New"
- Released: June 1987
- Genre: Country
- Length: 3:09
- Label: RCA
- Songwriter(s): Hank Cochran; Vern Gosdin; Red Lane
- Producer(s): Blake Mevis

Keith Whitley singles chronology
"Hard Livin'" (1987)	"Would These Arms Be in Your Way" (1987)	"Some Old Side Road" (1987)

"Would These Arms Be in Your Way'" is a song written by Hank Cochran, Vern Gosdin, and Red Lane, and recorded by American country music artist Keith Whitley. It was released in June 1987 as the lead-off single from the album Don't Close Your Eyes. The song reached number 36 on the Billboard Hot Country Singles & Tracks chart.

== Cover versions ==
This song has been covered numerous times, most notably by Daryle Singletary on his 1995 self-titled album, Gosdin on his 1998 album The Voice, Mark Chesnutt on his 2004 album Savin' the Honky Tonk, and Jamey Johnson on his 2012 album Living for a Song.

Gosdin, along with Emmylou Harris, provided the backing vocals for Whitley's version.

== Chart performance ==
Chart (1987)	Peak position
US Hot Country Songs (Billboard)	36
