= Miami, My Amy =

Single by Keith Whitley

from the album L.A. to Miami
- B-side: "I've Got the Heart for You"
- Released: November 1985
- Genre: Country
- Length: 3:28
- Label: RCA
- Songwriters: Hank Cochran; Dean Dillon; Royce Porter
- Producer: Blake Mevis

Keith Whitley singles chronology
"I've Got the Heart for You" (1985)	"Miami, My Amy" (1985)	"Ten Feet Away" (1986)

"Miami, My Amy" is a song written by Dean Dillon, Hank Cochran and Royce Porter, and recorded by American country music artist Keith Whitley. It was released in January 1986 as the second single from the album L.A. to Miami. The song reached number 14 on the Billboard Hot Country Singles & Tracks chart.

== Content ==
The song is about a man from Los Angeles, California, who meets a woman named Amy in Miami, Florida, before traveling back to his hometown. Upon returning to Los Angeles, he receives a phone call from the woman, who claims that she misses him and invites him to take a flight back to Miami. In the chorus, the narrator states that "Miami, my Amy, loves me after all".

== Critical reception ==
Kay Privett of the Memphis Commercial Appeal described the song favorably in a review of L.A. to Miami, comparing Whitley's "warm" vocals to those of Merle Haggard. In the book Country Music: The Rough Guide, Kurt Wolff stated that the song's initial success on the charts helped Whitley gain recognition for the success of his following album, Don't Close Your Eyes. He also stated that the song had a more country pop production style than Don't Close Your Eyes did.

From March 2022, the song trended on TikTok when users began posting videos with a nostalgic theme set to the song.

== Chart performance ==
"Miami, My Amy" debuted on the Billboard Hot Country Songs charts dated for November 2, 1985. The song became Whitley's first top-40 hit on that chart, peaking at number 14 in early 1986. The single's B-side was "I've Got the Heart for You", which had previously served as the album's lead single and peaked at number 57 on the same chart in 1985.

Chart (1985–1986)	Peak position
US Hot Country Songs (Billboard)	14
Canadian RPM Country Tracks	38

== Cover versions ==
In 2007, Daryle Singletary recorded the song for his covers album Straight from the Heart. Morgan Wallen sampled the song in his 2025 single "Miami".
