= Wherever You Are Tonight =

Studio album by Keith Whitley
- Released: October 24, 1995
- Recorded: Masterfonics Studio 6, Nashville, Tennessee
- Genre: Country
- Length: 33:13
- Label: BNA
- Producer: Steve Lindsey, Benny Quinn

Keith Whitley chronology
Kentucky Bluebird (1991)	Wherever You Are Tonight (1995)	Sad Songs & Waltzes (2000)

Wherever You Are Tonight is the fourth studio album released by American country music singer Keith Whitley. It was the third posthumous album of his career. The album consists of ten songwriter demos that Whitley had recorded. His vocal was the only track kept from those original demos. All new music arrangements were written by Ron Oates to renew and dynamically support Whitley's vocals. The album was released via BNA Records, the label to which Whitley's widow, Lorrie Morgan, was signed at the time. "Wherever You Are Tonight" peaked at number 75 on the U.S. Billboard Hot Country Singles & Tracks (now Hot Country Songs) charts in 1995. "Light at the End of the Tunnel" was originally recorded by John Anderson on his 1988 album, 10.

== Track listing ==
1. "I'm Losing You All Over Again" (Keith Whitley, Bill Caswell) – 4:10
2. "Daddy Loved Trains" (Whitley, Don Cook) – 3:01
3. "Tell Me Something I Don't Know" (Whitley, Cook, Gary Nicholson) – 3:02
4. "Blind and Afraid of the Dark" (Whitley, Max D. Barnes) – 3:58
5. "Buck" (Whitley) – 3:01
6. "Light at the End of the Tunnel" (Whitley, Cook) – 3:08
7. "I'm Not That Easy to Forget" (Whitley, Cook, Curly Putman) – 2:54
8. "Just How Bad Do You Wanna Feel Good" (Whitley, Caswell) – 2:56
9. "Leave Well Enough Alone" (Whitley, Caswell) – 3:44
10. "Wherever You Are Tonight" (Whitley, Cook, Nicholson) – 3:19

== Personnel ==
As listed in liner notes.

=== Musicians ===
- Ron Oates – piano, synthesizers
- Mike Chapman – bass guitar
- Jerry Kroon – drums
- Pete Bordonali – acoustic guitar, Dobro, mandolin
- Brent Rowan – electric guitar
- Sonny Garrish – pedal steel guitar, lap steel guitar, Dobro, Pedabro
- Michael Douchette – harmonica
- Bruce Watkins – fiddle, mandolin
- Rob Hajacos – fiddle
- Carl Gorodetzky – violin
- Conni Ellisor – violin
- Alan Umstead – violin
- Lee Larrison – violin
- Robert Mason – cello
- John Catchings – cello
- John Wesley Ryles – background vocals
- Penny Cardin – background vocals
- Tony King – background vocals
- Dennis Wilson – background vocals
- Keith Whitley – lead vocals

Rhythm section arrangements by Ron Oates. Orchestra arranged and conducted by Ron Oates
