= A Hard Act to Follow =

EP by Keith Whitley
- Released: September 28, 1984
- Recorded: March 8–27, 1984
- Studio: Music City Music Hall (Nashville, Tennessee)
- Genre: Country
- Length: 18:16
- Label: RCA
- Producer: Norro Wilson

Keith Whitley chronology
Somewhere Between (1982)	A Hard Act to Follow (1984)	L.A. to Miami (1985)

Singles from A Hard Act to Follow
- 1. "Turn Me to Love" Released: September 21, 1984; 2. "Don't Our Love Look Natural" Released: December 1984; 3. "A Hard Act to Follow" Released: February 1985

A Hard Act to Follow is an extended play by American country music singer Keith Whitley. It was released in September 1984 by RCA Records. The album includes the singles "Turn Me to Love" and "A Hard Act to Follow" and which respectively reached numbers 59 and 76 on the U.S. country singles charts. Al Campbell of AllMusic gave the album two stars out of five, saying that it did not "match up with the tremendous success" of his later albums for RCA.

The title song, "A Hard Act to Follow" had originally been released by Conway Twitty on his By Heart album earlier in 1984.

== Track listing ==
No.	Title	Writer(s)	Length
1.	"Turn Me to Love"	Wayland Holyfield; Norro Wilson	3:21
2.	"Living Like There's No Tomorrow (Finally Got to Me Tonight)"	Jim McBride; Roger Murrah	3:28
3.	"A Hard Act to Follow"	Gary Nicholson; David Chamberlain	2:36
4.	"If a Broken Heart Could Kill"	Holyfield; Wilson; Allen Henson	3:05
5.	"If You Think I'm Crazy Now (You Should Have Seen Me When I Was a Kid)"	Bob McDill	2:39
6.	"Don't Our Love Look Natural"	Harlan Howard; Don Cook	3:07
Total length:			18:16
