= L.A. to Miami =

L.A to Miami

Studio album by Keith Whitley
- Released: October 28, 1985
- Recorded: 1985
- Studio: Music City Music Hall and Eleven Eleven Studio (Nashville, Tennessee)
- Genre: Country
- Length: 29:43
- Label: RCA
- Producer: Blake Mevis

Keith Whitley chronology
A Hard Act to Follow (1984)	L.A to Miami (1985)	Don't Close Your Eyes (1988)

Singles from L.A. to Miami
- 1. "I've Got the Heart for You" Released: October 1985; 2. "Miami, My Amy" Released: January 25, 1986; 3. "Ten Feet Away" Released: June 9, 1986; 4. "Homecoming '63" Released: November 3, 1986; 5. "Hard Livin'" Released: March 14, 1987

L.A. to Miami is the debut studio album by American country music singer Keith Whitley. It was released in October 1985 by RCA Records. The album includes the singles "I've Got the Heart for You", "Miami, My Amy", "Ten Feet Away", "Homecoming '63" and "Hard Livin'", all of which charted on Billboard Hot Country Singles (now Hot Country Songs) between 1985 and 1987. Also included are two songs that later became singles for other artists: "On the Other Hand" and "Nobody in His Right Mind Would've Left Her", which were number ones for Randy Travis and George Strait, respectively, in 1986. The latter was previously a No. 25 country hit for its writer, Dean Dillon, in 1980.

== Critical reception ==
Al Campbell of AllMusic gave the album two stars out of five, saying that it "suffers as a whole from a lack of tempo change".

== Track listing ==
No.	Title	Writer(s)	Length
1.	"Miami, My Amy"	Hank Cochran; Dean Dillon; Royce Porter	3:28
2.	"I've Got the Heart for You"	Larry Boone; John Greenebaum	2:39
3.	"I Get the Picture"	Don Cook; Fred Koller	2:56
4.	"On the Other Hand"	Paul Overstreet; Don Schlitz	3:12
5.	"Hard Livin'"	David Halley	2:56
6.	"Ten Feet Away"	Max D. Barnes; Troy Seals; Billy Sherrill	3:23
7.	"That Stuff"	Sonny Curtis; Ron Hellard	3:24
8.	"Nobody in His Right Mind Would've Left Her"	Dillon	2:28
9.	"Homecoming '63"	Dillon; Porter	3:00
10.	"Quittin' Time"	Michael Garvin; Bucky Jones; Hellard	2:54

== Personnel ==
Adapted from liner notes.

=== Musicians ===
- Keith Whitley – lead vocals
- Mitch Humphries – keyboards
- Gary Prim – keyboards
- Brent Rowan – lead guitars, dobro
- Don Potter – rhythm guitars
- Bobby Thompson – rhythm guitars
- Chip Young – rhythm guitars
- Sonny Garrish – steel guitar, fretless dobro
- David Hungate – bass guitar
- Larry Paxton – bass guitar
- Jerry Kroon – drums
- Denis Solee – saxophone
- Carol Chase – backing vocals
- Curtis Young – backing vocals

=== Production ===
- Blake Mevis – producer
- Bill Harris – engineer
- Ron Reynolds – engineer
- Doug Crider – assistant engineer
- Randy Kling – mastering at Disc Mastering, Inc. (Nashville, Tennessee)
- Del Boyd – A&R coordinator
- Tal Howell Design – art direction
- Jim Shea – photography
- Don Light – management

== Chart performance ==
Chart (1986)	Peak position
U.S. Billboard Top Country Albums	26
