= Don't Close Your Eyes (Keith Whitley song) =

Single by Keith Whitley

from the album Don't Close Your Eyes
- B-side: "Lucky Dog"
- Released: March 1988
- Recorded: 1987
- Genre: Country
- Length: 4:11
- Label: RCA
- Songwriter: Bob McDill
- Producers: Garth Fundis; Keith Whitley

Keith Whitley singles chronology
"Some Old Side Road" (1987)	"Don't Close Your Eyes" (1988)	"When You Say Nothing at All" (1988)

Music video
- "Don't Close Your Eyes" by Keith Whitley on YouTube

"Don't Close Your Eyes" is a song written by Bob McDill, and recorded by American country music artist Keith Whitley. It was released in March 1988 as the third single from his album of the same name. In the United States, the single reached number-one for the week of August 13, while peaking at number two in Canada. Additionally, it was Billboard's number-one country single of the year for 1988.

== Content ==
In the song, Whitley talks about how a girl who is still stuck on a former boyfriend. Whitley tells not to close her eyes due to believing that she fantasizes about the other guy.

== Music video ==
The music video was directed by Michael McClary and premiered in mid-1988.

== Covers ==
The song was covered by Alan Jackson for Keith Whitley's 1994 tribute album, by Kellie Pickler for the deluxe edition of her 2008 self-titled second album, and by The Voice season six contestant Jake Worthington for his audition song and fan-chosen final performance. Garth Brooks performed the song at the 50th CMA Awards whilst Whitley's widow Lorrie Morgan looked emotional in the audience. Garth Brooks also recorded this song for The Ultimate Collection box set only sold at Target stores in 2016.

== Commercial performance ==
The song reached number one on Billboard's Hot Country Songs on chart dated August 13, 1988. After it became available for digital download, the song has sold 475,000 digital copies in the United States as of March 2019.

== Charts ==
=== Weekly chart ===
Chart (1988)	Peak position
US Hot Country Songs (Billboard)	1
Canadian RPM Country Tracks	2

=== Year-end Chart ===
Chart (1988)	Position
Canadian RPM Country Tracks	15
US Hot Country Songs (Billboard)	1

== Certifications ==
Region	Certification	Certified units/sales
United States (RIAA)	Platinum	1,000,000^{‡}
^{‡} Sales+streaming figures based on certification alone.

== "Don't Close Your Eyes (The Ashamed Remix)" ==
On July 1, 2015, Billboard announced the release of "Don't Close Your Eyes (Ashamed)" a tribute to Keith Whitley on his 60th birthday. The song is performed by Shady Records recording artist Kxng Crooked formerly known as Crooked I (from Slaughterhouse), Truth Ali, Jonathan Hay and Morgan McRae. "I feel the rap verses really capture the emotional torment of the original", producer Jonathan Hay tells Billboard. "As you may or may not know, Keith Whitley died from alcoholism – Kxng Crooked talks about his own chilling battle with alcoholism in his verse", he adds of the evocative tribute. "One of the main reasons I wanted to do this tribute is because I was raised in Kentucky, just like Keith Whitley", Hay continues. "Being all over the United States, it seems Whitley is more iconic back home in the 'Bluegrass State' than he is everywhere else. We want to change that". "Don't Close Your Eyes (The Ashamed Remix)" is part of The Urban Hitchcock LP.

The music video premiered on MTV News on August 27.
