= Don't Close Your Eyes (album) =

Studio album by Keith Whitley
- Released: May 31, 1988
- Recorded: 1987
- Studio: Music City Music Hall and Sound Emporium (Nashville, Tennessee)
- Genre: Country
- Length: 39:31
- Label: RCA
- Producer: Garth Fundis; Keith Whitley; Blake Mevis (tracks 6 and 7)

Keith Whitley chronology
L.A. to Miami (1985)	Don't Close Your Eyes (1988)	I Wonder Do You Think of Me (1989)

Singles from Don't Close Your Eyes
- 1. "Would These Arms Be in Your Way" Released: June 1987; 2. "Some Old Side Road" Released: November 2, 1987; 3. "Don't Close Your Eyes" Released: March 1988; 4. "When You Say Nothing at All" Released: August 1988; 5. "I'm No Stranger to the Rain" Released: January 1989

Professional ratings
Review scores
Source	Rating
AllMusic	4.5/5 stars

Don't Close Your Eyes is the second studio album by American country music artist Keith Whitley and the last to be released during his lifetime. The album was released on May 31, 1988, by RCA Records. After the success of his debut album, L.A. to Miami (1985), Whitley re-entered the studio and began recording a second album with producer Blake Mevis. After its completion, Whitley was unhappy with its production, and he convinced his label to shelve the recordings. Don't Close Your Eyes was subsequently recorded with producer Garth Fundis. The album's liner notes credit Fundis and Whitley with production on all tracks except "Some Old Side Road" and "Would These Arms Be in Your Way", which are credited to Mevis.

The album became a commercial success, and was certified Platinum by the Recording Industry Association of America. It contained three consecutive number one hits on the Hot Country Singles chart: "Don't Close Your Eyes", "When You Say Nothing at All", and "I'm No Stranger to the Rain".

== Track listing ==
No.	Title	Writer(s)	Length
1.	"Flying Colors"	Kim Morrison; Gary Talley	3:35
2.	"It's All Coming Back to Me Now"	Don Cook; Curly Putman; Keith Whitley	2:45
3.	"Lucky Dog"	Bill Caswell; Verlon Thompson	2:00
4.	"Don't Close Your Eyes"	Bob McDill	4:11
5.	"The Birmingham Turnaround"	Warren Robb; Sanger D. Shafer	2:49
6.	"Some Old Side Road"	Roger D. Ferris	3:25
7.	"Would These Arms Be in Your Way"	Hank Cochran; Vern Gosdin; Red Lane	3:10
8.	"I'm No Stranger to the Rain"	Sonny Curtis; Ron Hellard	3:33
9.	"I Never Go Around Mirrors"	Lefty Frizzell; Shafer	4:24
10.	"When You Say Nothing at All"	Paul Overstreet; Don Schlitz	3:40
11.	"A Day in the Life of a Fool"	Mike Dekle; Byron Hill	3:37
12.	"Honky Tonk Heart"	Johnny Neel; Lonnie Wilson	3:04
Total length:			39:31

- "Lucky Dog," "Would These Arms Be in Your Way," and "A Day in the Life of a Fool" were omitted from LP and cassette versions. 31:26 is the total length of the LP and Cassette versions. CD and digital versions are 39:31.

== Personnel ==
Compiled from liner notes.

All tracks except "Some Old Side Road" and "Would These Arms Be in Your Way"

Musicians

- Eddie Bayers — drums
- Paul Franklin — steel guitar, Pedabro
- Allen Frizzell — background vocals on "I Never Go Around Mirrors"
- Garth Fundis — background vocals
- Red Lane — acoustic guitar
- Mac McAnally — acoustic guitar
- Dave Pomeroy — bass guitar
- Matt Rollings — piano
- Billy Sanford — acoustic guitar, electric guitar
- Keith Whitley — lead vocals
- Dennis Wilson — background vocals

Technical

- Garth Fundis — production, mixing
- Carlos Grier — mastering assistant
- Gary Laney — engineering, mixing
- Denny Purcell — mastering
- Todd Sholar — assistant engineer
- Keith Whitley — production

"Some Old Side Road" and "Would These Arms Be in Your Way"

Musicians

- Sonny Garrish — steel guitar
- Vern Gosdin — background vocals on "Would These Arms Be in Your Way"
- Rob Hajacos — fiddle on "Would These Arms Be in Your Way"
- Emmylou Harris — background vocals on "Would These Arms Be in Your Way"
- Mitch Humphries — keyboards
- Jerry Kroon — drums
- Mike Lawler — synthesizer
- Larry Paxton — bass guitar
- Brent Rowan — acoustic guitar, electric guitar
- Keith Whitley — lead vocals
- Dennis Wilson — background vocals on "Some Old Side Road"
- Curtis "Mr. Harmony" Young — background vocals on "Some Old Side Road"

Technical

- Bill Harris — engineering
- Blake Mevis — production

== Chart performance ==
=== Weekly charts ===
Chart (1988–1989)	Peak position
Canadian Country Albums (RPM)	10
US Billboard 200	121
US Top Country Albums (Billboard)	8

=== Year-end charts ===
Chart (1988)	Position
US Top Country Albums (Billboard)	47
Chart (1989)	Position
US Top Country Albums (Billboard)	14
Chart (1990)	Position
US Top Country Albums (Billboard)	39

=== Singles ===
Year	Single	Peak positions	
Year	Single	US Country	CAN Country
1987	"Would These Arms Be in Your Way"	36	—
1987	"Some Old Side Road"	16	32
1988	"Don't Close Your Eyes"	1	2
1988	"When You Say Nothing at All"	1	1
1989	"I'm No Stranger to the Rain"	1	1
"—" denotes releases that did not chart

== Certifications ==
Region	Certification	Certified units/sales
United States (RIAA)	Platinum	1,000,000^{‡}
^{‡} Sales+streaming figures based on certification alone.

== Production ==
- Produced by Garth Fundis and Keith Whitley except for tracks 6 and 7, produced by Blake Mevis for Southwind Music, Inc.
- Engineered by Bill Harris, Gary Laney and Todd Sholar
- Mixed by Garth Fundis and Gary Laney
- Digital editing by Carlos Grier
- Mastered by Denny Purcell
