= I Wonder Do You Think of Me =

Studio album by Keith Whitley
- Released: August 1, 1989
- Recorded: April 1989
- Studio: Sound Emporium Studios and GroundStar Laboratories (Nashville, Tennessee)
- Genre: Country
- Length: 32:42
- Label: RCA
- Producer: Garth Fundis; Keith Whitley

Keith Whitley chronology
Don't Close Your Eyes (1988)	I Wonder Do You Think of Me (1989)	Greatest Hits (1990)

Singles from I Wonder Do You Think of Me
- 1. "I Wonder Do You Think of Me" Released: June 1989; 2. "It Ain't Nothin'" Released: October 1989; 3. "I'm Over You" Released: January 1990

Professional ratings
Review scores
Source	Rating
AllMusic	5/5 stars

I Wonder Do You Think of Me is the third studio album by American country music artist Keith Whitley, released in August 1989 by RCA Records. It is Whitley's first posthumous album, being released three months after his death from alcohol poisoning. It peaked at number two on the Top Country Albums chart, and is certified gold by the RIAA. The album includes the singles "I Wonder Do You Think of Me", "It Ain't Nothin'" and "I'm Over You", the first two of which were number one country hits.

Also included are two songs which later became singles for other artists: A Don Everly cover of "Brother Jukebox" that went on to become a number one country single in 1991 for Mark Chesnutt from the album Too Cold at Home, and "Between an Old Memory and Me" which was a number 11 country single in 1995 for Travis Tritt from the album Ten Feet Tall and Bulletproof.

== Track listing ==
No.	Title	Writer(s)	Length
1.	"Talk to Me Texas"	Don Cook; Bucky Jones; Curly Putman	3:30
2.	"Between an Old Memory and Me"	Charlie Craig; Keith Stegall	3:18
3.	"It Ain't Nothin'"	Tony Haselden	4:03
4.	"I'm Over You"	Tim Nichols; Zack Turner	3:01
5.	"Turn This Thing Around"	Gary Harrison; Gene Nelson	3:27
6.	"Lady's Choice"	Bill Rice; Sharon Vaughn	2:35
7.	"Brother Jukebox"	Paul Craft	2:44
8.	"Tennessee Courage"	Louis Brown; Rex Gosdin; Vern Gosdin	4:00
9.	"Heartbreak Highway"	Brent Mason; Don Pfrimmer; Lonnie Wilson	2:54
10.	"I Wonder Do You Think of Me"	Sanger D. Shafer	3:12

== Personnel ==
- Keith Whitley – lead vocals
- Matt Rollings – acoustic piano
- Biff Watson – keyboards
- Brent Mason – electric guitar, acoustic guitar
- Mac McAnally – acoustic guitar
- Billy Sanford – electric guitar, acoustic guitar, gut-string guitar, tic-tac bass
- Paul Franklin – steel guitar, pedabro
- Dave Pomeroy – bass guitar, electric upright bass
- Eddie Bayers – drums
- Rob Hajacos – fiddle
- Dennis Wilson – harmony vocals
- Curtis Young – harmony vocals

=== Production ===
- Joe Galante – A&R direction
- Mary Martin – A&R direction
- Garth Fundis – producer, mixing
- Keith Whitley – producer
- Gary Laney – recording, mix assistant
- Keith Odle – mix assistant
- Denny Purcell – mastering at Georgetown Masters (Nashville, Tennessee)
- Mary Hamilton – art direction, design
- Chuck Kuhn – photography
- Empire Studio – photo illustrations
- Jack McFadden – management

== Charts ==
=== Weekly charts ===
Chart (1989)	Peak position
US Billboard 200	115
US Top Country Albums (Billboard)	2

=== Year-end charts ===
Chart (1989)	Position
US Top Country Albums (Billboard)	51
Chart (1990)	Position
US Top Country Albums (Billboard)	20

== Certifications ==
Region	Certification	Certified units/sales
United States (RIAA)	Gold	500,000^{^}
^{^} Shipments figures based on certification alone.
