= Ten Feet Away =

Single by Keith Whitley

from the album L.A. to Miami
- B-side: "Nobody in His Right Mind Would've Left Her"
- Released: June 9, 1986
- Genre: Country
- Length: 3:20
- Label: RCA
- Songwriter(s): Billy Sherrill; Troy Seals; Max D. Barnes
- Producer(s): Blake Mevis

Keith Whitley singles chronology
"Miami, My Amy" (1986)	"Ten Feet Away" (1986)	"Homecoming '63" (1986)

"Ten Feet Away" is a song written by Billy Sherrill, Troy Seals and Max D. Barnes, and recorded by American country music artist Keith Whitley. It was released in June 1986 as the third single from the album L.A. to Miami. The song reached number nine on the Billboard Hot Country Singles & Tracks chart.

== Content ==
The song is a midtempo description of instant attraction.

== Critical reception ==
Kip Kirby, of Billboard magazine reviewed the song favorably, saying that Whitley is "more intimate and less hard-edged here than in recent outings".

== Chart performance ==
"Ten Feet Away" debuted at number 72 on the U.S. Billboard Hot Country Singles & Tracks for the week of June 21, 1986.

Chart (1986)	Peak position
US Hot Country Songs (Billboard)	9
Canadian RPM Country Tracks	16
