= I'm Over You (Keith Whitley song) =

Single by Keith Whitley

from the album I Wonder Do You Think of Me
- B-side: "Tennessee Courage"
- Released: January 1990
- Genre: Country
- Length: 3:01
- Label: RCA
- Songwriters: Tim Nichols; Zack Turner
- Producers: Garth Fundis; Keith Whitley

Keith Whitley singles chronology
"It Ain't Nothin'" (1989)	"I'm Over You" (1990)	"'Til a Tear Becomes a Rose" (1990)

"I'm Over You" is a song written by Tim Nichols and Zack Turner, and recorded by American country music artist Keith Whitley. It was posthumously released in January 1990 as the third single from the album I Wonder Do You Think of Me. The song reached No. 3 on the Billboard Hot Country Singles & Tracks chart.

== Content and history ==
I Wonder Do You Think of Me was Whitley's final studio album before his death from alcohol poisoning in 1989. "I'm Over You" was the album's third and final single, written by Tim Nichols and Zack Turner. It is composed in the key of F major, following a main chord pattern of F–B♭–F.

== Cover versions ==
In 2010, country artist Chris Young released an acoustic cover version on his extended play Voices.

== Charts ==
=== Weekly charts ===
Chart (1990)	Peak position
Canada Country Singles (RPM)	3
US Hot Country Songs (Billboard)	3

=== Year-end charts ===
Chart (1990)	Position
Canada Country Tracks (RPM)	48
US Country Songs (Billboard)	15
