= When You Say Nothing at All =

1988 single by Keith Whitley

Single by Keith Whitley

from the album Don't Close Your Eyes
- B-side: "Lucky Dog"
- Released: 1988
- Genre: Country
- Length: 3:40
- Label: RCA
- Songwriters: Paul Overstreet; Don Schlitz
- Producers: Garth Fundis; Keith Whitley

Keith Whitley singles chronology
"Don't Close Your Eyes" (1988)	"When You Say Nothing at All" (1988)	"I'm No Stranger to the Rain" (1989)

Music video
- "When You Say Nothing at All" on YouTube

"When You Say Nothing at All" is a country song written by Paul Overstreet and Don Schlitz. It was a hit song for four different performers: Keith Whitley, who took it to the top of the Billboard Hot Country Singles chart on December 24, 1988; Alison Krauss & Union Station, whose version was their first solo top-10 country hit in 1995; Irish singer Frances Black, whose 1996 version became her third Irish top-10 single; and Irish pop singer Ronan Keating, whose 1999 version was his first solo single and a number-one hit in the United Kingdom, Ireland, and New Zealand.

== Origin ==
Songwriters Paul Overstreet and Don Schlitz came up with "When You Say Nothing at All" at the end of an otherwise unproductive day. Strumming a guitar, trying to write their next song, they were coming up empty. "As we tried to find another way to say nothing, we came up with the song", Overstreet later told author Ace Collins. They thought the song was OK, but nothing special. When Keith Whitley heard it, he loved it, and was not going to let it get away. Earlier, he had recorded another Overstreet-Schlitz composition that became a No. 1 hit for another artist – Randy Travis' "On the Other Hand". Whitley did not plan to let "When You Say Nothing at All" meet the same fate.

== Keith Whitley ==
RCA released "When You Say Nothing at All" as the follow-up single to the title song of Whitley's Don't Close Your Eyes album. The former song already had hit No. 1 on the Billboard Hot Country Singles chart, his first chart-topper after three prior singles made the top 10. "When You Say Nothing at All" entered the Hot Country Singles chart on September 17, 1988, at No. 61, and gradually rose to the top, where it stayed for two weeks at the end of the year. It was the second of five consecutive chart-topping singles for Whitley, who did not live to see the last two, as he died on May 9, 1989, of alcohol poisoning. "Keith did a great job singin' that song", co-composer Schlitz told author Tom Roland. "He truly sang it from the heart". In 2004, Whitley's original was ranked 12th among CMT's 100 Greatest Love Songs. It was sung by Sara Evans on the show. As of February 2015, the song has sold 599,000 digital copies in the US after it became available for download.

=== Charts ===
==== Weekly charts ====
Chart (1988)	Peak position
Canada Country Tracks (RPM)	1
US Hot Country Songs (Billboard)	1

==== Year-end charts ====
Chart (1988)	Position
Canada Country Tracks (RPM)	56

=== Certifications ===
Region	Certification	Certified units/sales
United States (RIAA)	Platinum	1,000,000^{‡}
^{^} Shipments figures based on certification alone.

== Alison Krauss & Union Station version ==
"When You Say Nothing at All"

Single by Alison Krauss & Union Station

from the album Keith Whitley: A Tribute Album and Now That I've Found You: A Collection
- B-side: "Charlotte's in North Carolina" (by Keith Whitley)
- Released: January 1995
- Studio: Scruggs Sound (Berry Hill, Tennessee)
- Genre: Country
- Length: 4:20
- Label: BNA
- Songwriters: Paul Overstreet; Don Schlitz
- Producer: Randy Scruggs

Alison Krauss singles chronology
"Somewhere in the Vicinity of the Heart" (1995)	"When You Say Nothing at All" (1995)	"Baby Now That I've Found You" (1995)

Music video
- "When You Say Nothing at All" on YouTube

In 1994, bluegrass music group Alison Krauss & Union Station covered the song for a tribute album to Whitley titled Keith Whitley: A Tribute Album. After this cover began to receive unsolicited airplay, BNA Records, the label that had released the album, issued it to radio in January 1995. That version, also featured on Krauss' compilation Now That I've Found You: A Collection, peaked at No. 3 on the Billboard Hot Country Singles & Tracks chart, and a commercial single reached No. 2 on the same magazine's Hot Country Singles Sales chart. The B-side of the single was Keith Whitley's "Charlotte's in North Carolina", which was another previously unreleased track featured on the Tribute album.

Its success, as well as that of the album, caught Krauss by surprise. "It's a freak thing", she told a Los Angeles Times reporter in March 1995. "It's kinda ticklin' us all. We haven't had anything really chart before. At all. Isn't it funny though? We don't know what's goin' on....The office said, 'Hey, it's charting,' and we're like, 'Huh?'"

Mike Cromwell, then the production director at WMIL-FM in Milwaukee, Wisconsin, concocted a duet merging elements of the Alison Krauss & Union Station version with Whitley's original hit version. The "duet" garnered national attention, and it spread from at least Philadelphia to Albuquerque. This "duet" was however never officially serviced to radio and has never been available commercially.

The Alison Krauss & Union Station recording won the 1995 CMA award for "Single of the Year". It has sold 468,000 digital downloads as of May 2017.

=== Track listing ===
1. "When You Say Nothing at All"
2. "Charlotte's In North Carolina"

=== Charts ===
==== Weekly charts ====
Chart (1995)	Peak position
Canada Country Singles (RPM)	7
UK Singles (Official Charts)	81
US Billboard Hot 100	53
US Hot Country Songs (Billboard)	3

==== Year-end charts ====
Chart (1995)	Position
Canada Country Tracks (RPM)	99

=== Certifications ===
Certifications for "When You Say Nothing at All"
Region	Certification	Certified units/sales
United States (RIAA)	Gold	500,000^{‡}
^{‡} Sales+streaming figures based on certification alone.

== Frances Black version ==
"When You Say Nothing at All"

Single by Frances Black

from the album The Smile on Your Face
- B-side: "Send Him a Letter"
- Released: August 1996
- Length: 5:07
- Label: Dara
- Songwriters: Paul Overstreet; Don Schlitz
- Producers: Arty McGlynn; Ciarán Byrnes

Frances Black singles chronology
"The Sky Road" (1995)	"When You Say Nothing at All" (1996)	"Stranger on the Shore" (1997)

Music video
- "When You Say Nothing at All" on YouTube

"When You Say Nothing At All" is the opening track on Frances Black's third solo album, The Smile on Your Face (1996), the title of the album being a lyric from this song. Released in August 1996 as the album's first single, this single became her third to reach the Irish top 10, peaking at number eight during an 11-week run in the top 30.

=== Track listing ===
1. "When You Say Nothing at All"
2. "Send Him a Letter"

=== Personnel ===
- Paul Overstreet – writing
- Don Schilitz – writing
- Frances Black – vocals
- Mary Black – backing vocals
- Arty McGlynn – guitar, production
- Ciarán Byrnes – engineering, production
- Rod McVey – keyboards, piano
- Noel Bridgeman – drums
- James Blennerhasset – bass

=== Charts ===
Chart (1996)	Peak position
Ireland (IRMA)	8

== Ronan Keating version ==
"When You Say Nothing at All"

Single by Ronan Keating

from the album Ronan, Notting Hill and By Request
- Released: July 26, 1999
- Studio: Metropolis, the Aquarium (London, England)
- Length: 4:18
- Label: Polydor
- Songwriters: Paul Overstreet; Don Schlitz
- Producer: Stephen Lipson

Ronan Keating singles chronology
"When You Say Nothing at All" (1999)	"These Days" (1999)

Paulina Rubio singles chronology
"Casanova" (2002)	"When You Say Nothing at All (Cuando no Dices Nada)" (2003)	"Te Quise Tanto" (2004)

Music video
- "When You Say Nothing at All" on YouTube

"When You Say Nothing at All" was released as the debut solo single by Irish singer-songwriter Ronan Keating. The song was recorded for the soundtrack to the film Notting Hill and also appeared on Keating's debut solo album, Ronan. This cover was released on July 26, 1999, in the United Kingdom. It peaked at number one in the UK, Ireland, and New Zealand. The single is certified double platinum in the UK and platinum in Australia, Denmark, and Sweden.

In February 2003, Keating re-recorded the song as a duet with Mexican singer Paulina Rubio in Spanglish, which was released in Spain, Mexico, and Latin America (excluding Brazil) to promote Keating's second studio album, Destination. In Brazil, Ronan chose the Brazilian singer Deborah Blando to re-record the song in English and English-Portuguese for the 10 Years of Hits album exclusive for that country. A music video was recorded for this version with Blando. Following Keating's December 31, 2025 BBC One New Year's Eve special, Ronan Keating and Friends: A New Year's Eve Party, "When You Say Nothing At All" debuted at number 63 on the UK Singles Downloads Chart on January 2, 2026.

=== Critical reception ===
Daily Record wrote that Keating "sounds like Marti Pellow on this drippy ballad". The Spanish website Jenesaispop described the Spanglish version as one of the most "squeaky" bilingual collaboration, while Victor González of GQ Spain praised the collaboration as "great" in an article of "unusual collaborations".

=== Track listings ===
- UK CD1
1. "When You Say Nothing at All"
2. "When You Say Nothing at All" (acoustic version)
3. "This Is Your Song"
4. "When You Say Nothing at All" (video CD ROM)
- UK CD2
1. "When You Say Nothing At All"
2. "At the End of a Perfect Day"
3. "I Will Miss You"
- UK cassette single
1. "When You Say Nothing at All"
2. "This Is Your Song"
- Australian CD single
1. "When You Say Nothing at All"
2. "This Is Your Song"
3. "When You Say Nothing at All" (acoustic version)

=== Credits and personnel ===
Credits are taken from the UK CD1 liner notes.

Studios

- Recorded at Metropolis and the Aquarium (London, England)
- Mixed at the Aquarium (London, England)
- Mastered at 777 Productions (London, England)

Personnel

- Paul Overstreet – writing
- Don Schilitz – writing
- Ronan Keating – vocals
- Miriam Stockley – backing vocals
- Tessa Niles – backing vocals
- Dominic Miller – guitar
- Stephen Lipson – bass, production, programming
- Peter-John Vettese – keyboards
- James McNally – whistle, accordion
- Andy Duncan – drums
- Heff Moraes – engineering, mixing
- Arun Chakraverty – mastering

=== Charts ===
==== Weekly charts ====
Chart (1999)	Peak position
Australia (ARIA)	3
Austria (Ö3 Austria Top 40)	5
Belgium (Ultratop 50 Flanders)	3
Belgium (Ultratop 50 Wallonia)	38
Canada Adult Contemporary (RPM)	78
Denmark (IFPI)	6
Estonia (Eesti Top 20)	9
Europe (Eurochart Hot 100)	6
Europe (European Hit Radio)	5
Finland (Suomen virallinen lista)	5
France (SNEP)	41
Germany (GfK)	6
Hungary (Mahasz)	8
Iceland (Íslenski Listinn Topp 40)	2
Ireland (IRMA)	1
Italy (Musica e dischi)	2
Latvia (Latvijas Top 20)	8
Netherlands (Dutch Top 40)	5
Netherlands (Single Top 100)	5
New Zealand (Recorded Music NZ)	1
Norway (VG-lista)	5
Scottish Singles Sales (Official Charts)	1
Spain Airplay (Top 40 Radio)	32
Sweden (Sverigetopplistan)	2
Switzerland (Schweizer Hitparade)	4
UK Singles (Official Charts)	1
UK Airplay (Music Week)	2

Chart (2026)	Peak position
UK Singles Downloads (OCC)	63

==== Year-end charts ====
Chart (1999)	Position
Australia (ARIA)	15
Austria (Ö3 Austria Top 40)	38
Belgium (Ultratop 50 Flanders)	25
Europe (Eurochart Hot 100)	28
Germany (Media Control)	49
Netherlands (Dutch Top 40)	19
Netherlands (Single Top 100)	39
New Zealand (RIANZ)	5
Sweden (Hitlistan)	19
Taiwan (Hito Radio)	77
UK Singles (OCC)	18
UK Airplay (Music Week)	20

=== Certifications ===
Region	Certification	Certified units/sales
Australia (ARIA)	Platinum	70,000^{^}
Belgium (BRMA)	Gold	25,000^{*}
Denmark (IFPI Danmark)	Platinum	90,000^{‡}
Germany (BVMI)	Gold	300,000^{‡}
Italy (FIMI)	Gold	35,000^{‡}
New Zealand (RMNZ)	2× Platinum	60,000^{‡}
Norway (IFPI Norway)	Gold	
Spain (Promusicae)	Gold	30,000^{‡}
Sweden (GLF)	Platinum	30,000^{^}
United Kingdom (BPI)	2× Platinum	1,200,000^{‡}
^{*} Sales figures based on certification alone.^{^} Shipments figures based on certification alone.^{‡} Sales+streaming figures based on certification alone.

=== Release history ===
Region	Date	Format(s)	Label(s)	Ref.
United Kingdom	July 26, 1999	CD; cassette	Polydor	
Japan	October 1, 1999	CD	Polydor	
