= I'm No Stranger to the Rain =

Single by Keith Whitley

from the album Don't Close Your Eyes
- B-side: "A Day in the Life of a Fool"
- Released: January 1989
- Recorded: 1988
- Genre: Country
- Length: 3:33
- Label: RCA
- Songwriters: Sonny Curtis; Ron Hellard
- Producers: Garth Fundis; Keith Whitley

Keith Whitley singles chronology
"When You Say Nothing at All" (1988)	"I'm No Stranger to the Rain" (1989)	"I Wonder Do You Think of Me" (1989)

"I'm No Stranger to the Rain" is a song recorded by American country music artist Keith Whitley. It was released in January 1989 as the fifth and final single from his album Don't Close Your Eyes, and was the last single released during Whitley's lifetime. It peaked at number-one in both the United States and Canada. Joe Diffie covered the song on Whitley's 1995 tribute album. It was written by Sonny Curtis and Ron Hellard.

The song won Single of the Year at the Country Music Association Awards in 1989 after Whitley's death.

== Critical reception ==
In 2014, Rolling Stone ranked the song at number 139 on its 200 Greatest Country Songs of All Time ranking.

== Music video ==
A music video was filmed for this song, which was Whitley's last video of his career. It features Whitley and his band performing at the now closed Douglas Corner Cafe in Nashville.

== Chart positions ==
Chart (1989)	Peak position
Canada Country Singles (RPM)	1
US Hot Country Songs (Billboard)	1

=== Year-end charts ===
Chart (1989)	Position
Canada Country Tracks (RPM)	9
US Country Songs (Billboard)	7

== Certifications ==
Region	Certification	Certified units/sales
United States (RIAA)	Gold	500,000^{‡}
^{‡} Sales+streaming figures based on certification alone.
