= 16th Avenue Records =

Independent record label

- Parent company: Apple Productions
- Founded: 1981
- Founder: Stan Campbell, Veronica Mataseje
- Defunct: 1990
- Status: Defunct
- Genre: Country
- Country of origin: Canada, U.S.
- Location: Toronto, Nashville

16th Avenue Records was an independent record label specializing in country music. The first 16th Avenue label was founded in Toronto in May 1981 by Apple Productions Corporation principals Stan Campbell and Veronica Mataseje. In May 1984, 16th Avenue Records moved to Nashville, Tennessee. In 1987 the Opryland Music Group assumed the 16th Avenue Records name with Jerry Bradley as President. The label's first signee was Charley Pride, whose 1987 single "Have I Got Some Blues for You" was the label's first release.

Other artists who recorded for 16th Avenue included Vicki Bird, Canyon, Lane Caudell, John Conlee, Neal McCoy, Robin & Cruiser, John Wesley Ryles, and Randy VanWarmer. The label closed in November 1990.
