= Keith Whitley =

American country singer (1954–1989)

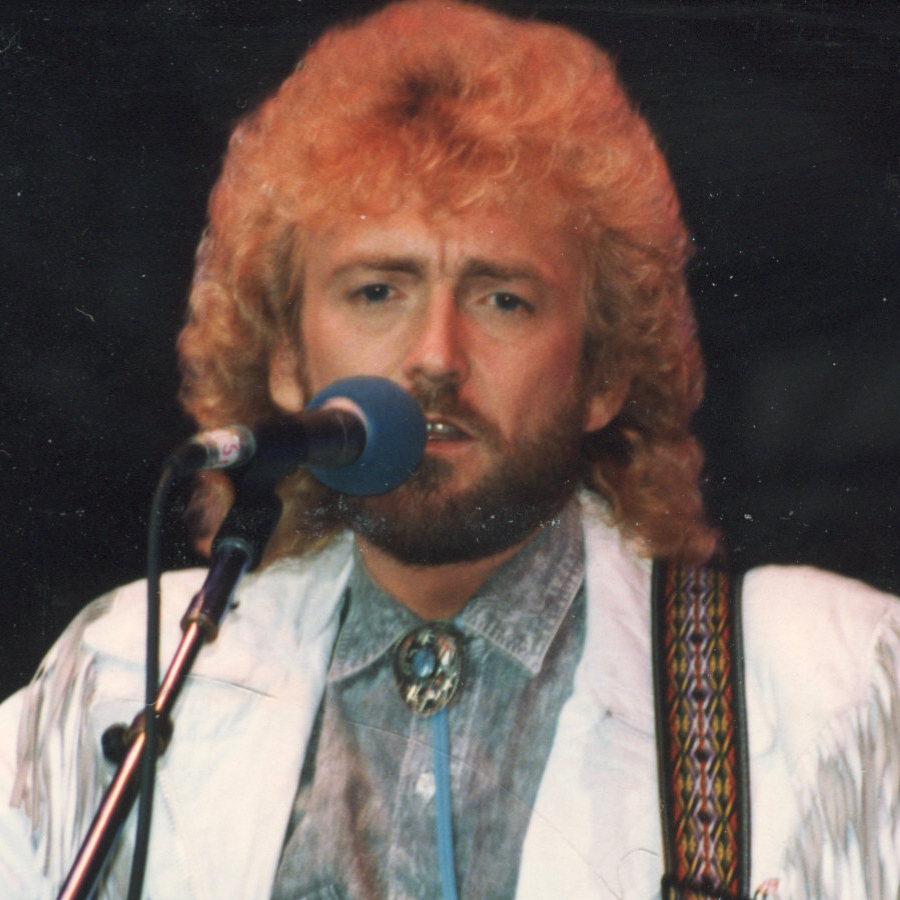
- Whitley performing in 1988

Background information
- Born: Jackie Keith Whitley; July 1, 1954; Ashland, Kentucky, U.S.
- Origin: Sandy Hook, Kentucky, U.S.
- Died: May 9, 1989 (aged 34) Goodlettsville, Tennessee, U.S.
- Genres: Neotraditional country; honky-tonk; bluegrass (early work)
- Occupations: Singer, songwriter
- Instruments: Vocals, guitar
- Years active: 1970–1989
- Labels: RCA; BNA
- Formerly of: Clinch Mountain Boys, J.D. Crowe & The New South
- Spouse: Lorrie Morgan (m. 1986)

Jackie Keith Whitley (July 1, 1954 – May 9, 1989) was an American country music and bluegrass singer and songwriter. During his career, he released only two albums, but charted 12 singles on the Billboard country charts, and seven more after his death.

Born in Ashland, Kentucky, Whitley was raised in the nearby town of Sandy Hook. He began his career there in 1970, performing in Ralph Stanley's band. Establishing himself as a lead singer in bluegrass music, Whitley moved to Nashville in 1983 and began his recording career there. His first top-20 country hit single, "Miami, My Amy", was released in 1986. In 1988, his first three singles from his second studio album Don't Close Your Eyes, the title song, "When You Say Nothing at All", and "I'm No Stranger to the Rain" were number-one hits. During the final years of his life, Whitley struggled with a lifelong alcohol addiction. He completed his sessions for his follow-up album, I Wonder Do You Think of Me, before dying of acute alcohol poisoning in 1989 at his Goodlettsville home at age 34. The album's title song, along with "It Ain't Nothin'" and "I'm Over You", were released as singles after his death.

In 2022, Whitley was posthumously inducted into the Country Music Hall of Fame.

== Early life ==
Whitley was born to Faye Ferguson (editor of The Elliott County News) and Elmer Whitley (an electrician) in Ashland, Kentucky, but was raised 46 miles away in Sandy Hook, and attended Sandy Hook High School. He had two brothers, Randy and Dwight, and a sister, Mary. The Whitley family is of English and Scots-Irish descent and has lived in the Elliott County area since the 1840s.

While Whitley was a teenager in Sandy Hook, his friends and he would pass the time drinking bootleg bourbon and racing their cars down mountain roads at dangerous speeds. Whitley was once in a car whose driver attempted to round a curve at 120 miles per hour (190 km/h). The car wrecked, killing his friend and almost breaking Whitley's neck. In another incident, he drove his car off a 120-foot (37 m) cliff into a frozen river, escaping with only a broken collar bone. Whitley's older brother Randy was killed in an October 1983 motorcycle accident.

== Musical style and influences ==
Keith Whitley's musical style was rooted in Kentucky bluegrass in his early career as a member of Ralph Stanley's Clinch Mountain Boys, but Whitley later shifted towards neotraditional country and honky-tonk during the peak and end of his career. Whitley's influences ranged from Appalachian bluegrass performers such as Ralph Stanley to traditional country and honky-tonk musicians such as Hank Williams, George Jones, Merle Haggard, and Lefty Frizzell.

== Musical career ==
In 1969, he performed in a musical contest in Ezel, Kentucky, with brother Dwight on five-string banjo. Ricky Skaggs was also in the contest. Skaggs and Whitley instantly bonded and subsequently became close friends.

Whitley and Skaggs, both 16 years old, were discovered in Ft. Gay, West Virginia, by Ralph Stanley, who was 45 minutes late for a gig due to a flat tire. Stanley opened the door of the club and heard what he thought was the Stanley Brothers playing on a jukebox. However, it was Whitley and Skaggs, who "sounded just like me and Carter in the early days". The two soon joined Stanley's band. Whitley became lead singer for Stanley in 1974. Whitley also played with J.D. Crowe and the New South in the mid-1970s. During this period, he established himself as one of the most versatile and talented lead singers in bluegrass. His singing was heavily influenced by Carter Stanley and Lefty Frizzell. He moved to Nashville in 1983 to pursue a country music career, and soon signed a record deal with RCA Records.

Whitley's first solo album, A Hard Act to Follow, was released in 1984, and featured a more mainstream country style. While Whitley was working hard to achieve his own style, the songs he produced were inconsistent. Critics regarded the album as too erratic. Whitley honed his sound within the next few years for his next album, L.A. to Miami, which, released in 1985, would give him his first top-20 country hit single, "Miami, My Amy". The song was followed by three more hit songs: "Ten Feet Away", "Homecoming '63", and "Hard Livin'", The album also included "On the Other Hand" and "Nobody in His Right Mind Would've Left Her". "On the Other Hand" was pitched to Whitley before Randy Travis released the song as a single, and when Whitley's version was not released as a single, Travis released his version in 1986, as did George Strait. During his tour to promote L.A. to Miami, he met and began a romantic relationship with country singer Lorrie Morgan. They were married in November 1986, and had their only child, a son, Jesse Keith Whitley, in June 1987. Whitley also adopted Lorrie's daughter, Morgan, from her first marriage.

During the new recording sessions in 1987, Whitley began feeling that the songs chosen were not up to his standards, so he approached RCA and asked if the project of 15 songs could be shelved. He also asked if he could take a major role in creating the songs and in production. The new album, titled Don't Close Your Eyes, was released in 1988, and the album sold extremely well. The album contained one of the many songs that Whitley had a hand in writing in his years at Tree Publishing, "It's All Coming Back to Me Now". On the album was a remake of Lefty Frizzell's classic standard "I Never Go Around Mirrors", and the song became a huge hit at Whitley's concerts. The first three singles from the album—"When You Say Nothing at All", "I'm No Stranger to the Rain", and the title cut—all reached number one on Billboard's country charts during the autumn of 1988 and the winter of 1989, with the title track "Don't Close Your Eyes" being ranked as Billboard’s number-one country song of 1988. Another cut from the album, "Honky Tonk Heart", was slated to be the follow-up single to "Don't Close Your Eyes", but was passed over in favor of "When You Say Nothing at All"; a music video was even made for the song. Shortly thereafter, "I'm No Stranger to the Rain" also earned Whitley his first and only Country Music Association award as a solo artist and a Grammy nomination for Best Country Vocal Performance, Male.

In early 1989, Whitley approached RCA chairman Joe Galante with the intention of releasing "I Never Go Around Mirrors" as a single. Galante approved of the musical flexibility that Whitley achieved with the song; however, he suggested that Whitley record something new and more upbeat. The result was a song Whitley had optioned for his previous album called I Wonder Do You Think of Me, and was to result in his next album release.

Whitley was scheduled to be invited to join the Grand Ole Opry in late May 1989. He was posthumously inducted as a former member on October 14, 2023, in a tribute concert held during that night's Opry broadcast. His final concert was held in Brazoria, Texas, at the Armadillo Ballroom on May 6, 1989.

== Death ==
On May 9, 1989, Whitley had a brief phone call with his mother, and was later visited by his brother-in-law, Lane Palmer. The two had coffee and were planning a day of golf and lunch, after which Whitley planned to start writing songs to record with Lorrie Morgan when she returned from her concert tour. Palmer left around 8:30 am, asking Whitley to be ready to leave within an hour. Upon returning, Palmer found Whitley unresponsive on his bed and called an ambulance. Whitley was taken to the hospital, where he was pronounced dead; he was 34.

The official cause of death was acute ethanol poisoning. Davidson County Medical Examiner Charles Harlan stated that Whitley's blood alcohol level was 0.47 (the equivalent of 20 one-ounce shots of 100-proof whiskey). He was born in 1954 per his birth certificate and passport, but his grave marker erroneously recorded his birth year as 1955.

The day after his death, Music Row was lined with black ribbons in memory of Whitley. He is buried in the Spring Hill Cemetery outside Nashville. His gravestone reads, "Forever yours faithfully" (part one) and "His being was my reason" (part two).

== Posthumous releases ==
At the time of his death, Whitley had just finished work on his third and final studio album, I Wonder Do You Think of Me. The album was released three months after his death, on August 1, 1989. The album produced two more number-one hits, with the title track and "It Ain't Nothin'." "I'm Over You" also was in the top five in early 1990, reaching number three.

Two new songs were added to Greatest Hits: The first, "Tell Lorrie I Love Her" was written and recorded at home by Whitley for Morgan, originally intended as a work tape for Whitley's friend Curtis "Mr. Harmony" Young to sing at Whitley's wedding. The second was "'Til a Tear Becomes a Rose", a 1987 demonstration recording taken from Tree that originally featured harmony vocals by childhood friend Ricky Skaggs. Lorrie Morgan, with creative control and license to Whitley's namesake, recorded her voice alongside Whitley's, and released it as a single, which rose to number 13 and won the 1990 CMA award for Best Vocal Collaboration, as well as a Grammy nomination for Best Country Vocal Collaboration.

RCA also released a compilation of performance clips (from his days in the Ralph Stanley-fronted Clinch Mountain Boys), interviews, and some previously unreleased material under the title Kentucky Bluebird. The album produced hits for Whitley, as well, including a duet with Earl Thomas Conley, named "Brotherly Love", which peaked at number two in late 1991 and gave Whitley his second consecutive posthumous Grammy nomination for Best Country Vocal Collaboration.

In 1994, Whitley's widow, Lorrie Morgan, organized several of Whitley's friends in bluegrass and some of the big names in country at the time to record a tribute album to Whitley. Keith Whitley: A Tribute Album was released in September 1994 via BNA. It included covers of Whitley's songs from artists such as Alan Jackson, Diamond Rio, and Ricky Skaggs. The album also included four previously unreleased tracks recorded by Whitley in 1987, one of which had Morgan dubbed in as a duet partner. The album also included two original songs: "Little Boy Lost", co-written and sung by Daron Norwood, and "A Voice Still Rings True", a multiple-artist song. Alison Krauss's rendition of "When You Say Nothing at All" was released as a single from the album, reaching number three on the country charts in 1995.

In 1995, the album Wherever You Are Tonight was released, produced by Lorrie Morgan, featuring restored demos of 1986–1988, with crisper 1990s recording techniques and a full orchestra. The album and single of the same name both did very well on the Billboard and R&R charts, and Super Hits and The Essential Keith Whitley followed in 1996. The Essential contained the remastered and long-since unavailable LP and Whitley's debut, the six-track "A Hard Act to Follow", and a scrapped song from 1986's L.A. to Miami, "I Wonder Where You Are Tonight".

== Legacy ==
Several film projects depicting Whitley's life were slated, but none has yet come to fruition. One idea was a film version of the George Vescey and Lorrie Morgan-penned Forever Yours, Faithfully. While Morgan's book was a benchmark in piecing together Whitley's final moments, perhaps the most research went into a project titled Kentucky Bluebird, which was to star writer/actor/director David Keith.

Despite his brief moment in the spotlight, Whitley's legacy remains. He was inducted into the Country Music Hall of Fame in 2022; prior to that, he was the subject of an exhibit detailing his life and legacy. Whitley retains a persistent influence on country artists, including Tim McGraw, Ronnie Dunn, and Dierks Bentley. He is also the progenitor of newer artists like Morgan Wallen; a song named after Whitley features on Wallen's 2023 double album, One Thing at a Time, which won the approval of Whitley's widow and son.

Whitley is the only person to be posthumously recognized as a former member of the Grand Ole Opry, without ever being an active member. Management had scheduled Whitley for an appearance in late May 1989, where he was to be invited to join, but his death on May 9 interrupted those plans. As the Opry has a policy only inducting living artists as members, Whitley's induction was scrapped. During a Keith Whitley tribute show at the Opry on October 14, 2023, Garth Brooks and Lorrie Morgan announced that Whitley's name would be engraved on a plaque and included in the Opry's Member Gallery backstage, alongside every act who has held Opry membership at some point in the show's history, dating to 1925.

== Discography ==
- 1984: A Hard Act to Follow (EP)
- 1985: L.A. to Miami
- 1988: Don't Close Your Eyes
- 1989: I Wonder Do You Think of Me
- 1991: Kentucky Bluebird
- 1995: Wherever You Are Tonight
- 2000: Sad Songs and Waltzes

=== Billboard number-one hits ===
- "Don't Close Your Eyes" (1 week, 1988)
- "When You Say Nothing at All" (2 weeks, 1988)
- "I'm No Stranger to the Rain" (2 weeks, 1989)
- "I Wonder Do You Think of Me" (1 week, 1989)
- "It Ain't Nothin'" (1 week, 1990)

== Awards and nominations ==
=== Grammy Awards ===
Year	Nominee / work	Award	Result
1990	"I'm No Stranger to the Rain"	Best Male Country Vocal Performance	Nominated
1991	"'Til a Tear Becomes a Rose"	Best Country Collaboration with Vocals	Nominated
1992	"Brotherly Love"	Best Country Collaboration with Vocals	Nominated

=== Music City News Country Awards and TNN/Music City News Country Awards ===
Year	Nominee / work	Award	Result
1989	Keith Whitley	Star of Tomorrow	Nominated
1990	I Wonder Do You Think of Me	Album of the Year	Nominated
1990	"I'm No Stranger to the Rain"	Single of the Year	Nominated
1991	"'Til a Tear Becomes a Rose"	Single of the Year	Nominated
1991	Lorrie Morgan and Keith Whitley	Vocal Collaboration of the Year	Won
1994	Alan Jackson and Keith Whitley	Vocal Collaboration of the Year	Nominated

=== TNN Viewers' Choice Awards ===
Year	Nominee / work	Award	Result
1989	Keith Whitley	Favorite Newcomer of the Year	Nominated
1989	"Don't Close Your Eyes"	Favorite Song of the Year	Nominated

=== Academy of Country Music Awards ===
Year	Nominee / work	Award	Result
1986	Keith Whitley	Top New Male Vocalist	Nominated
1989	"Don't Close Your Eyes"	Song of the Year	Nominated
1989	"Don't Close Your Eyes"	Single Record of the Year	Nominated
1990	"I'm No Stranger to the Rain"	Single Record of the Year	Nominated
1990	"I Wonder Do You Think of Me"	Song of the Year	Shortlisted
1990	Keith Whitley	Top Male Vocalist of the Year	Shortlisted
1992	"Brotherly Love"	Video of the Year	Nominated
2013	Keith Whitley	Cliffie Stone Pioneer Award	Awarded

=== Country Music Association Awards ===
Year	Nominee / work	Award	Result
1989	"I'm No Stranger to the Rain"	Single of the Year	Won
1989	Keith Whitley	Horizon Award	Nominated
1989	Keith Whitley	Male Vocalist of the Year	Nominated
1990	I Wonder Do You Think of Me	Album of the Year	Nominated
1990	Keith Whitley and Lorrie Morgan	Vocal Event of the Year	Won
1992	Keith Whitley and Earl Thomas Conley	Vocal Event of the Year	Nominated
