= Opry 100: A Live Celebration =

2025 American television special

- Promotional poster for the special
- Presented by: Blake Shelton
- Narrated by: Scotty McCreery

Opry 100: A Live Celebration is a three-hour television concert special to commemorate the 100th birthday of the Grand Ole Opry. Produced by Baz Halpin, Mark Bracco and Linda Gierahn, it aired live from the Grand Ole Opry House on March 19, 2025, on NBC and was streamed simultaneously on Peacock. The show also featured some performances which were pre-recorded at the Ryman Auditorium. The special was hosted by Opry member Blake Shelton, with voiceover from Opry member Scotty McCreery, and featured performances and tributes to the history of the Opry and its contribution to country music. Over 50 of the Opry's 75 living members either performed or were featured in the special, or were in attendance. The event marked the final time that Opry members Jeannie Seely and Stu Phillips would make appearances on behalf of the Opry prior to their respective deaths later in 2025 (Seely on video; Phillips on stage).

Red carpet coverage was hosted by Kelly Sutton on E! News, NBC and the Opry's official YouTube channels. The special is part of a series of Opry licensed television productions produced as part of NBC's purchase of a minority stake in the brand in 2022.

== Performers ==
Almost all of the performers on the special were Grand Ole Opry members, with the exception of The McCrary Sisters, The War and Treaty, Amy Grant, Yolanda Adams, Post Malone, Aloe Blacc, and Eric Church. Jelly Roll was also scheduled to perform, but did not appear. The finale performance of "Will the Circle Be Unbroken?" was cut from the television broadcast but was later released on the Opry's social media channels and included in the Peacock broadcast.

Performer(s)	Song(s)
Reba McEntire	Tribute to Patsy Cline and Loretta Lynn "Sweet Dreams" "You Ain't Woman Enough (To Take My Man)"
Reba McEntire Trisha Yearwood	"The Night the Lights Went Out in Georgia"
Ketch Secor Jamey Johnson^{§} Dierks Bentley	Tribute to Charlie Daniels "Drinkin' My Baby Goodbye" "The Devil Went Down to Georgia"
Marty Stuart^{§} Lainey Wilson	Tribute to Hank Williams "Lost Highway"
Marty Stuart^{§} Lainey Wilson	"Things a Man Oughta Know"
Steven Curtis Chapman^{§} The McCrary Sisters The War and Treaty Amy Grant Yolanda Adams	Tribute to the Opry's gospel roots "Precious Memories" "Just a Closer Walk with Thee" "How Great Thou Art"
Carrie Underwood	Tribute to Randy Travis "Three Wooden Crosses" "Forever and Ever, Amen"
Kelsea Ballerini	Tribute to Barbara Mandrell "I Was Country When Country Wasn't Cool"
Alan Jackson	"Chattahoochee"
Travis Tritt Post Malone	"T-R-O-U-B-L-E"
Ashley McBryde Terri Clark	"Girl Goin' Nowhere"
Aloe Blacc The McCrary Sisters	Tribute to Charley Pride "Kiss an Angel Good Mornin'"
Eric Church	"Why Not Me"
Keith Urban	Tribute to Crystal Gayle "Don't It Make My Brown Eyes Blue"
Keith Urban	"Wasted Time"
Alison Krauss & Union Station	Tribute to the Opry's bluegrass roots "Let Me Touch You for Awhile"
Clint Black	"Nothin' but the Taillights"
Trace Adkins	"(This Ain't) No Thinkin' Thing"
Blake Shelton	Tribute to Joe Diffie "Pickup Man"
Garth Brooks Trisha Yearwood	Tribute to George Jones and Tammy Wynette "He Stopped Loving Her Today" "Your Good Girl's Gonna Go Bad" "Golden Ring"
Brad Paisley Alison Krauss	Tribute to Bill Anderson "Whiskey Lullaby"
Carly Pearce	Tribute to Dolly Parton "Jolene"
Ashley McBryde Post Malone	Tribute to Johnny Cash and June Carter Cash "Jackson"
Luke Combs	Tribute to George Jones "The Grand Tour"
Luke Combs	"Hurricane"
Vince Gill^{§} Ricky Skaggs^{§} Sonya Isaacs^{§}	Tribute to deceased Opry members "Go Rest High on That Mountain"
Reba McEntire Lady A Carrie Underwood Ensemble	"I Will Always Love You"
Scotty McCreery^{§} Dustin Lynch^{§} Ensemble	""Will the Circle Be Unbroken?"

== Appearances ==
=== Featured ===
The following Opry members made special appearances during the special:

- Sara Evans and Dustin Lynch^{§} - featured in a package about the history of the Opry
- Barbara Mandrell - on stage during a tribute performance by Kelsea Ballerini
- Randy Travis - in the audience for a tribute performance by Carrie Underwood
- Jeannie Seely^{†} - featured in a package about special moments in Opry history
- Chris Janson - featured in a package about special moments in Opry history
- Lauren Alaina - featured in a segment about Opry inductions
- Crystal Gayle - in the audience during a tribute performance by Keith Urban
- Rhonda Vincent - introduced Alison Krauss and Union Station
- Bill Anderson^{§} - introduced Brad Paisley and Alison Krauss and remained on stage throughout their performance
- Dolly Parton - appeared via video message

=== Opry members in attendance ===
The following Opry members were not featured prominently in the special, but were in the audience, and took part in the finale performance:

- Mandy Barnett^{§}
- T. Graham Brown^{§}
- Henry Cho^{§}
- John Conlee^{§}
- Dailey & Vincent^{§}
- Diamond Rio
- Gary Mule Deer^{§}
- Larry Gatlin & the Gatlin Brothers^{§}
- Del McCoury^{§}
- Charlie McCoy^{§}
- Ronnie Milsap
- Eddie Montgomery
- Oak Ridge Boys
- Stu Phillips^{†}
- Don Schlitz^{§}
- Connie Smith
- The Isaacs^{§}
- Sharon and Cheryl White^{§}
- Mark Wills^{§}

=== Not in attendance ===
The following living Opry members were not present in any form during the special:

- Bobby Bare
- Emmylou Harris
- Patty Loveless
- Martina McBride
- Little Big Town
- Craig Morgan
- Lorrie Morgan^{§}
- Opry Square Dancers^{§}
- Jon Pardi
- Jeanne Pruett
- Rascal Flatts
- Riders in the Sky^{§}
- Darius Rucker
- Mike Snider
- Pam Tillis^{§}
- Josh Turner
- Ricky Van Shelton
- Steve Wariner
- Gene Watson
- Chris Young

† Final appearance on behalf of the Opry prior to their respective deaths.
§ Appeared on the Opry's 100th Anniversary live radio broadcast special on November 28, 2025.
