= A Life in Pieces =

A Life in Pieces may refer to:

- A Life in Pieces, a 1990 BBC comedy series starring Peter Cook
- A Life in Pieces, a novella about the BBC science fiction series Doctor Who spin-off character Bernice Summerfield

== See also ==
- Life in Pieces, an American television series
- "Pieces of My Life", a 1975 single by Elvis Presley
