= T-R-O-U-B-L-E (album) =

Studio album by Travis Tritt
- Released: August 18, 1992
- Recorded: 1991–1992
- Genre: Country
- Length: 43:12
- Label: Warner Bros. Nashville
- Producer: Gregg Brown

Travis Tritt chronology
It's All About to Change (1991)	T-R-O-U-B-L-E (1992)	A Travis Tritt Christmas: Loving Time of the Year (1992)

Singles from T-R-O-U-B-L-E
- 1. "Lord Have Mercy on the Working Man" Released: August 10, 1992; 2. "Can I Trust You with My Heart" Released: November 30, 1992; 3. "T-R-O-U-B-L-E" Released: March 13, 1993; 4. "Looking Out for Number One" Released: July 5, 1993; 5. "Worth Every Mile" Released: October 30, 1993

Professional ratings
Review scores
Source	Rating
AllMusic	3/5 stars
Chicago Tribune	4/4 stars
Entertainment Weekly	B−
Los Angeles Times	2.5/4 stars
Windsor Star	A

T-R-O-U-B-L-E is the third studio album by American country music artist Travis Tritt. It was released on Warner Bros. Records in 1992. Five singles were released from the album: "Lord Have Mercy on the Working Man", "Can I Trust You with My Heart", the title track, "Looking Out for Number One", and "Worth Every Mile"; they reached numbers 5, 1, 13, 11, and 30 on Billboard Hot Country Songs. The album was certified 2× Platinum by the RIAA for U.S. shipments of two million copies.

== Content ==
"Lord Have Mercy on the Working Man" was the first single released from the album. Written by Kostas, it features Brooks & Dunn, T. Graham Brown, George Jones, Little Texas, Dana McVicker, Tanya Tucker, and Porter Wagoner as backing vocalists on the final chorus. Two cover songs are on the album: the title track, originally a single in 1975 for Elvis Presley, and "Leave My Girl Alone", previously recorded by Stevie Ray Vaughan on his 1989 album In Step, and earlier by Chicago blues guitarist Buddy Guy.

== Track listing ==
No.	Title	Writer(s)	Length
1.	"Looking Out for Number One"	Travis Tritt; Troy Seals	3:30
2.	"Can I Trust You With My Heart"	Tritt; Stewart Harris	3:34
3.	"T-R-O-U-B-L-E"	Jerry Chesnut	3:00
4.	"When I Touch You"	Tritt; Harris	3:56
5.	"Lord Have Mercy on the Working Man"	Kostas	4:55
6.	"I Wish I Could Go Back Home"	Tritt	4:07
7.	"A Hundred Years from Now"	Marty Stuart	2:54
8.	"Blue Collar Man"	Tritt; Gary Rossington	3:47
9.	"Worth Every Mile"	Tritt	5:06
10.	"Leave My Girl Alone"	Buddy Guy	8:52
Total length:			43:41

== Personnel ==
Adapted from the liner notes.

- Sam Bacco – timpani (2, 6, 9), cymbals (2, 6), crotales (2), tambourine (2, 3, 4, 9), percussion (3), marimba (4), cabasa (4), shaker (4, 6), bass drum (5), spoons (5), wobble board (5), broom (5), chimes (6, 9), gong (6, 9), congas (6), zill (9)
- Richard Bennett – acoustic guitar (5), slide guitar (5)
- Mike Brignardello – bass guitar
- Larry Byrom – slide guitar (1, 3, 10), acoustic guitar (2, 3, 5, 7, 8)
- John Catchings – cello (6, 9)
- John Cowan – backing vocals (1, 3, 4, 6, 7)
- Wendell Cox – electric guitar (5)
- Terry Crisp – baritone steel guitar (2, 6, 9), pedal steel guitar (4, 5, 7), resonator guitar (5)
- David Davidson – violin (6)
- Stuart Duncan – fiddle (4–7)
- Connie Heard – violin (6)
- Jack Holder – electric guitar (1, 2, 3, 7, 8, 10)
- John Jorgenson – electric guitar (3, 4, 6, 7, 9), six-string bass guitar (7)
- Billy Livsey – Wurlitzer electric piano (1, 4), Hammond organ (2, 3, 6, 10), harmonium (2, 9), clavinet (3)
- Dennis Locorriere – backing vocals (7, 8)
- Dana McVicker – backing vocals (1, 2, 3, 4, 6, 8, 9)
- Edgar Meyer – double bass (6, 9), string arrangements (6, 9)
- Mark O'Connor – fiddle (9)
- Bobby Ogdin – piano (1, 8), Hammond organ (1, 8)
- Hargus "Pig" Robbins – piano (all tracks except 5)
- Matt Rollings – piano (5)
- Gary Rossington – electric guitar (8)
- Jimmy Joe Ruggiere – harmonica (1, 3, 5, 6, 7, 8, 10)
- Steve Turner – drums
- Billy Joe Walker Jr. – acoustic guitar (1, 4, 5, 6, 9), electric guitar (1, 2, 3, 4, 5, 7, 8, 10), slide guitar (2)
- Kris Wilkinson – viola (6, 9)
- Dennis Wilson – backing vocals (5)
- Curtis Young – backing vocals (5)
- Reggie Young – electric guitar (2, 3, 6, 9, 10)

Guest vocals on last chorus of "Lord Have Mercy on the Working Man"

- Brooks & Dunn
- T. Graham Brown
- George Jones
- Little Texas
- Dana McVicker
- Tanya Tucker
- Porter Wagoner

Production

- Gregg Brown – producer
- John Dickson – engineering
- Rob Feaster – recording, mixing (tracks 4, 6, 9)
- Erik Flettrich – engineering
- Carlos Grier – digital editing
- Chris Hammond – recording (track 5)
- John Hampton – mixing (all tracks except 4, 6, 9)
- Clark Hook – engineering
- Bob Ludwig – mastering
- Patrick Kelly – engineering
- Carry Summers – engineering

== Charts ==
=== Weekly charts ===
Chart (1992)	Peak position
Canadian Albums (RPM)	39
Canadian Country Albums (RPM)	3
US Billboard 200	27
US Top Country Albums (Billboard)	6

=== Year-end charts ===
Chart (1992)	Position
US Top Country Albums (Billboard)	40
Chart (1993)	Position
US Top Country Albums (Billboard)	24

== Certifications ==
Region	Certification	Certified units/sales
Canada (Music Canada)	Gold	50,000^{^}
United States (RIAA)	2× Platinum	2,000,000^{^}
^{^} Shipments figures based on certification alone.
