= Lord Have Mercy on the Working Man =

Single by Travis Tritt

from the album T-R-O-U-B-L-E
- B-side: "Lord Have Mercy on the Working Man" (album version)
- Released: August 10, 1992
- Genre: Country
- Length: 4:55 (album version); 4:12 (single version)
- Label: Warner Bros. Nashville
- Songwriter: Kostas
- Producer: Gregg Brown

Travis Tritt singles chronology
"Nothing Short of Dying" (1992)	"Lord Have Mercy on the Working Man" (1992)	"Can I Trust You with My Heart" (1992)

"Lord Have Mercy on the Working Man" is a song written by Kostas and recorded by American country music singer Travis Tritt. It was released in August 1992 as the first of five singles from his third studio album, T-R-O-U-B-L-E. The song became Tritt's tenth entry on the Billboard Hot Country Singles & Tracks (now Hot Country Songs) charts, where it peaked at number 5.

== Content ==
"Lord Have Mercy on the Working Man" is a moderate up-tempo whose lyrics centralize on a theme of economic injustice towards blue collar workers.

The instrumentation features various forms of percussion from Sam Bacco, including crotales, wobble board, spoons and a broom. Richard Bennett and Wendell Cox play guitar solos before the third verse, and Brooks & Dunn, T. Graham Brown, George Jones, Little Texas, Dana McVicker, Tanya Tucker and Porter Wagoner all sing background vocals on the final chorus.

== Personnel ==
- Sam Bacco – bass drum, spoons, wobble board, broom
- Richard Bennett – acoustic guitar, slide guitar
- Mike Brignardello – bass guitar
- Brooks & Dunn – additional backing vocals on final chorus
- T. Graham Brown – additional backing vocals on final chorus
- Larry Byrom – acoustic guitar
- Wendell Cox – electric guitar
- Terry Crisp – pedal steel guitar, resonator guitar
- Stuart Duncan – fiddle
- George Jones – additional backing vocals on final chorus
- Little Texas – additional backing vocals on final chorus
- Dana McVicker – additional backing vocals on final chorus
- Matt Rollings – piano
- Jimmy Joe Ruggiere – harmonica
- Steve Turner – drums
- Billy Joe Walker Jr. – acoustic guitar, electric guitar
- Travis Tritt – vocals
- Tanya Tucker – additional backing vocals on final chorus
- Porter Wagoner – additional backing vocals on final chorus
- Dennis Wilson – backing vocals
- Curtis Young – backing vocals

== Critical reception ==
Teresa M. Walker, in her review for the Gainesville Sun, said that with the assistance from superstars on the final chorus, the song "should shoot up the charts." Dave Larsen of the Dayton Daily News cited it as one of the stronger tracks on the album, saying that the album "works best when Tritt sticks with the populist approach." Alanna Nash of Entertainment Weekly said of the song, "Tritt finds a solid image for his laborer's lament[…]But the melody is so slight that he resorts to an acoustic arrangement that evokes Jimmie Rodgers and the young Roy Acuff." Deborah Evans Price, of Billboard magazine gave the song a mixed review, saying that while the final chorus of song features famous country artists, it was too bad that the entire song isn't as strong as the last verse. Leeann Ward of Country Universe praised the song, referring to it as the best working man anthem of the 1990s, and amongst the best working man anthems overall.

== Music video ==
Jack Cole directed the song's music video. In the book Country Music Culture: From Hard Times to Heaven, Curtis W. Ellison wrote that the song's music video "confronted a litany of personal oppressions attributed to government policy" that coincided with Bill Clinton's presidential campaign.

== Chart performance ==
"Lord Have Mercy on the Working Man" spent 20 weeks on the Billboard Hot Country Singles & Tracks (now Hot Country Songs) charts in 1992, peaking at number 5 for the chart dated November 7. The song also reached number 10 on the Canadian RPM Country Tracks charts.

Chart (1992)	Peak position
Canada Country Singles (RPM)	10
US Hot Country Songs (Billboard)	5
