= Looking Out for Number One (Travis Tritt song) =

1993 single by Travis Tritt

Single by Travis Tritt

from the album T-R-O-U-B-L-E
- B-side: "Blue Collar Man"
- Released: July 5, 1993
- Genre: Country
- Length: 3:30
- Label: Warner Bros. Nashville
- Songwriters: Travis Tritt, Troy Seals
- Producer: Gregg Brown

Travis Tritt singles chronology
"T-R-O-U-B-L-E" (1993)	"Looking Out for Number One" (1993)	"Worth Every Mile" (1993)

"Looking Out for Number One" is a song co-written and recorded by American country music artist Travis Tritt. It was released in July 1993 as the fourth single from the album T-R-O-U-B-L-E. The song reached number 11 on the Billboard Hot Country Singles & Tracks chart. The song was written by Tritt and Troy Seals.

== Critical reception ==
Deborah Evans Price, of Billboard magazine reviewed the song favorably, saying that Tritt "maintains his uncanny sense of balance between country and southern rock in this ode to self-preservation." She says that the song contains "ripping guitar and growling blues harp way up front." She goes on to say that Tritt's "pinched-from-the-throat vocals manage to keep things reassuringly country."

== Chart performance ==
Chart (1993)	Peak position
Canada Country Singles (RPM)	4
US Hot Country Songs (Billboard)	11

=== Year-end charts ===
Chart (1993)	Position
Canada Country Tracks (RPM)	71
