= Today (Elvis Presley album) =

Studio album by Elvis Presley
- Released: May 7, 1975
- Recorded: March 10–12, 1975
- Studio: RCA (Hollywood)
- Genre: Country; pop
- Length: 34:15
- Label: RCA Victor
- Producer: Felton Jarvis

Elvis Presley chronology
Promised Land (1975)	Today (1975)	Elvis: A Legendary Performer Volume 2 (1976)

Singles from Today
- 1. "T-R-O-U-B-L-E" Released: April 22, 1975; 2. "Bringing It Back" Released: September 20, 1975; 3. "Green, Green Grass of Home" Released: November 21, 1975

Professional ratings
Review scores
Source	Rating
AllMusic	4/5 stars
Christgau's Record Guide	B−
Rough Guides	3/5 stars

Today is the twenty-second studio album by American singer Elvis Presley, released on May 7, 1975, by RCA Records. The album featured the country and pop music sound typical of Elvis during the 1970s, as well as a new rock and roll song, "T-R-O-U-B-L-E", which was released as its first single and went Top 40 in the US. "Bringing It Back" was its second single in the US. The album also features covers of songs by Perry Como, Tom Jones, the Pointer Sisters, Billy Swan, Faye Adams, the Statler Brothers and Charlie Rich.

== Content ==
The Today sessions were held in RCA's Studio C, Hollywood, Los Angeles, California, March 10–12, 1975, and marked the last time Presley would record in a studio. He last recorded at Studio C, Hollywood in 1972 where he recorded the gold records "Burning Love" and "Separate Ways". At this time, Elvis was 40 years old. He was accompanied by his then-current girlfriend, Sheila Ryan. In the 2005 Follow That Dream reissue of the album, Presley can be heard saying "step up here Sheila, let me sing to ya baby" on Take 1 of Don McLean's "And I Love You So". He continued to make "And I Love You So" and "Fairytale" a part of his live concerts until his death. On stage, he often referred to "Fairytale" as the story of his life.

"Green, Green Grass of Home" was released as a single in the UK, where it went Top 30, and also received US airplay. Presley was a big fan of Tom Jones' version of the song; while travelling, he would repeatedly have his friends call the local radio stations to request it.

== Reissues ==
In 2005 Today was reissued on the Follow That Dream label in a special edition that contained the original album tracks along with a selection of alternate takes.

== Track listing ==
=== Original release ===
Side A
No.	Title	Writer(s)	Recording date	Length
1.	"T-R-O-U-B-L-E"	Jerry Chesnut	March 11, 1975	3:03
2.	"And I Love You So"	Don McLean	March 10, 1975	3:41
3.	"Susan When She Tried"	Don Reid	March 11, 1975	2:20
4.	"Woman Without Love"	Jerry Chesnut	March 11, 1975	3:37
5.	"Shake a Hand"	Joe Morris	March 11, 1975	3:52

Side B
No.	Title	Writer(s)	Recording date	Length
1.	"Pieces of My Life"	Troy Seals	March 12, 1975	4:07
2.	"Fairytale"	Bonnie Pointer, Anita Pointer	March 10, 1975	2:47
3.	"I Can Help"	Billy Swan	March 10, 1975	4:08
4.	"Bringing It Back"	Gregg Gordon	March 12, 1975	3:04
5.	"Green, Green Grass of Home"	Curly Putman	March 10, 1975	3:39

=== Follow That Dream re-issue ===
Disc 1
No.	Title	Length
1.	"T-R-O-U-B-L-E"
2.	"And I Love You So"
3.	"Susan When She Tried"
4.	"Woman Without Love"
5.	"Shake A Hand"
6.	"Pieces of My Life"
7.	"Fairytale"
8.	"I Can Help"
9.	"Bringin’ It Back"
10.	"Green, Green Grass Of Home"
11.	"Tiger Man"
12.	"And I Love You So" (take 2)
13.	"Pieces Of My Life" (take 1)
14.	"Fairytale" (takes 1,2)
15.	"Bringin’ It Back" (take 1)
16.	"Green, Green Grass Of Home" (take 1)
17.	"Shake A Hand" (take 1)
18.	"Susan When She Tried" (take 3)
19.	"Pieces Of My Life" (takes 2,3)
20.	"And I Love You So" (take 3)

Disc 2
No.	Title	Length
1.	"Fairytale"
2.	"Green, Green Grass Of Home"
3.	"I Can Help"
4.	"And I Love You So"
5.	"Susan When She Tried"
6.	"T-R-O-U-B-L-E"
7.	"Woman Without Love"
8.	"Shake A Hand"
9.	"Bringin’ It Back"
10.	"Pieces Of My Life"
11.	"Green, Green Grass Of Home" (takes 2,3)
12.	"Susan When She Tried" (takes 1,2)
13.	"And I Love You So" (take 1)
14.	"Bringin' It Back" (takes 2,3)
15.	"T-R-O-U-B-L-E" (take 1)
16.	"Shake A Hand" (take 2)

=== 2015 reissue ===
==== Disc 1 ====
Original album track listing + Undubbed Session Mixes

==== Disc 2 ====
All tracks previously unissued

No.	Title	Length
1.	"Also Sprach Zarathustra"
2.	"See See Rider"
3.	"Medley: I Got a Woman / Amen"
4.	"Love Me"
5.	"If You Love Me (Let Me Know)"
6.	"Love Me Tender"
7.	"All Shook Up"
8.	"Medley: (Let Me Be Your) Teddy Bear / Don't Be Cruel"
9.	"Hound Dog"
10.	"The Wonder of You"
11.	"Burning Love"
12.	"Introductions / Johnny B. Goode"
13.	"Introductions / School Days"
14.	"T-R-O-U-B-L-E"
15.	"Why Me Lord?"
16.	"How Great Thou Art"
17.	"Let Me Be There"
18.	"An American Trilogy"
19.	"Funny How Time Slips Away"
20.	"Little Darlin'"
21.	"Medley: Mystery Train / Tiger Man"
22.	"Can't Help Falling in Love"

== Personnel ==
Sourced from Keith Flynn and Ernst Jorgensen's examination of original session tapes, session logs, and RCA and union/AFM paperwork.

- Elvis Presley – lead vocals; harmony vocals on "T-R-O-U-B-L-E"
- Voice (Donnie Sumner, Sherrill Nielsen, Tim Baty, Thomas Hensley) – backing vocals
- James Burton – lead guitar
- John Wilkinson – rhythm guitar
- Charlie Hodge – acoustic rhythm guitar
- Duke Bardwell – bass guitar on "T-R-O-U-B-L-E"
- Glen D. Hardin – piano
- Tony Brown – piano on "Bringing It Back"
- Ronnie Tutt – drums
- David Briggs – clavinet

Overdubbed

- Millie Kirkham – backing vocals
- Mary Holladay – backing vocals
- Ginger Holladay – backing vocals
- Lea Berinati – backing vocals
- Chip Young – guitar on "And I Love You So", "Shake A Hand", and "Fairytale"; additional lead guitar on "I Can Help"
- Johnny Christopher – guitar except "T-R-O-U-B-L-E", "Shake A Hand", and "I Can Help"
- Norbert Putnam – bass guitar except "T-R-O-U-B-L-E" and "Shake A Hand"
- Mike Leech – bass guitar on "Shake A Hand"
- Buddy Spicher – fiddle on "Fairytale"
- Weldon Myrick – steel guitar on "Fairytale"
- Farrell Morris – bells and percussion on "And I Love You So", "Shake A Hand", and "I Can Help"
- Charles Rose – saxophone on "And I Love You So", "Shake A Hand", and "I Can Help"
- Ronald Eades – baritone saxophone on "And I Love You So", "Shake A Hand", and "I Can Help"
- Harvey Thompson – trombone on "And I Love You So", "Shake A Hand", and "I Can Help"
- Harrison Calloway – trumpet on "And I Love You So", "Shake A Hand", and "I Can Help"

Technical

- Felton Jarvis – producer
- Al Pachucki, Mike Shockley, Rick Ruggieri – engineer
