= List of Grand Ole Opry members =

The Grand Ole Opry is a country music concert and radio show, held between twice and five times per week, in Nashville, Tennessee. The show began as a radio barn dance on November 28, 1925, by George D. Hay and has since become one of the genre's most enduring and revered stages. Each performance consists of multiple guest artists as well as Opry members, sometimes called "Opry stars". Members are selected by Opry management (with input from existing members) based on several factors including critical and commercial success, respect for the history of country music and commitment to appearing on the program. Opry members have permission to perform at any Opry show they wish. A typical Opry performance will feature seven to nine artists, including (but not limited to) at least three members.

== Membership process ==
Publicly, once a new member is chosen, an existing member will ask the new member to join the Opry live on-air during the broadcast, usually when the new member is performing as a guest. In recent years, invitations have been delivered in other public settings. Prior to 1999, membership was effective immediately upon invitation. Currently, artists who accept the invitation will return on a later date for a scheduled performance and induction ceremony. Being invited to become a member of the Grand Ole Opry is considered one of country music's crowning achievements.

Over its history, the Opry has featured a large, rotating ensemble of members ranging from all-time greats and neotraditionalists to contemporary stars. At its beginning, it featured only instrumental string bands; the show's repertoire slowly broadened to allow singers and vocal groups in the late 1930s, electric amplification by the early 1940s, and eventually drums, with the first performance featuring a full drum kit taking place in 1967. As the Opry is a running series, membership requires that the performer appear regularly on the program to remain a member of the show. It originally signed its artists to short-term contracts and required its artists to perform 26 shows per year; the program shifted to a permanent membership model in the 1960s and progressively relaxed its requirements over the next several decades. If a performer ceases appearing at the Opry altogether or runs afoul of management, they can be stripped of their membership; if the exiled performer reconciles and renews their commitment to the show, they can be reinstated. Membership expires when the performer dies; if a single member of a duo or group retires or dies, the surviving members may continue to maintain Opry membership on the group's behalf. Only once, in the case of Keith Whitley, has a member been inducted posthumously, as the process to induct Whitley had already begun before he died in 1989 and was eventually completed in 2023. The Opry, in general, allows performers who retire, or are no longer physically able to perform on a regular basis to stay as members. The Grand Ole Opry House maintains a member gallery backstage that contains an engraved brass nameplate for every act who has ever been a member of the Grand Ole Opry (including those whose membership has lapsed or have been asked to leave).

== Familial connections ==
In addition to several family acts who have held membership over the years, two sets of siblings have been invited to join the Opry separately:

- Loretta Lynn and her younger sister, Crystal Gayle
- Darrin Vincent (half of Dailey & Vincent) and his older sister, Rhonda

Likewise, there have been three instances of parents and their children being inducted separately:

- Ernest Tubb and his son Justin
- George Morgan and his daughter Lorrie
- Pam Tillis and her father Mel

Several Opry members over the years have been married to each other:

- Kitty Wells and Johnnie Wright; Married 1937–2011 (his death)
- June Carter and Carl Smith; Married 1952–1956 (divorce)
- Jean Shepard and Hawkshaw Hawkins; married 1960-1963 (his death)
- June Carter Cash and Johnny Cash; Married 1968–2003 (her death)
- George Jones and Tammy Wynette; Married 1969–1975 (divorce)
- Ricky Skaggs and Sharon White (of The Whites); Married since 1981
- Lorrie Morgan and Keith Whitley; married 1986-1989 (his death)
- Connie Smith and Marty Stuart; Married since 1997
- Garth Brooks and Trisha Yearwood; Married since 2005
- Karen Fairchild and Jimi Westbrook (who make up half of the quartet Little Big Town); Married since 2006

== Current membership ==
Excluding the Opry Square Dancers, who have sui generis membership status, there are currently 76 Grand Ole Opry members.

- Sixty-two of the Opry's current members perform as solo musical artists.
  - Of those, seven have retired, but may make occasional appearances on the show in performing or non-performing roles (Barbara Mandrell, Jeanne Pruett, Randy Travis, Ricky Van Shelton, Patty Loveless, Ronnie Milsap and Alan Jackson).
- Two of the members are stand-up comedians (Henry Cho and Gary Mule Deer).
- Twelve duos and groups hold membership.
  - Among them, three have had a member die since their respective inductions (Montgomery Gentry, The Oak Ridge Boys, and The Whites).
    - The Oak Ridge Boys have been inducted twice, under two completely different lineups.
  - Two other groups have each replaced living group members since being inducted, but maintain their Opry membership (Old Crow Medicine Show and Diamond Rio).
- Five living people are former Opry members who no longer hold membership: Leroy Van Dyke, Norma Jean, Doug Kershaw, Sam Wellington of the Four Guys, and Willie Nelson.
- Two artists (Charlie Worsham and Neal McCoy) have accepted the invitation to join and are awaiting their respective official inductions.

=== Age and service of current members ===
- The oldest living member (although retired) is Jeanne Pruett, born in 1935
  - The oldest living person to have ever been a member is Leroy Van Dyke, born in 1929 (he allowed his membership to lapse but still occasionally appears in a non-member capacity)
  - Bill Anderson is the oldest living active member (born in 1937), the longest-serving current member as well as the longest-serving member in the show's history, as his membership has not lapsed since his induction in 1961.
  - Connie Smith, who joined in 1965, is the Opry's longest-serving female member. She and Anderson are the last remaining members to have been inducted before 1972, and the only active members inducted before 1976.
- The youngest member is Lauren Alaina, born in 1994.
  - The youngest members ever inducted were Doyle and Teddy Wilburn, child prodigies who were inducted in 1940 at ages ten and nine, respectively; after an initial run, their membership was suspended until 1956 due to child labor laws.

== All-time membership ==
Indicates active members
Indicates active members who have retired from performing, but may make occasional appearances
Indicates acts invited to join, but not yet officially inducted
Indicates acts in which at least one of the members is deceased, retired, or has left the group, with the other(s) maintaining active membership

Acts with a ^{†} are deceased; ^{‡} indicates a member of the group is deceased.

=== 1920s ===
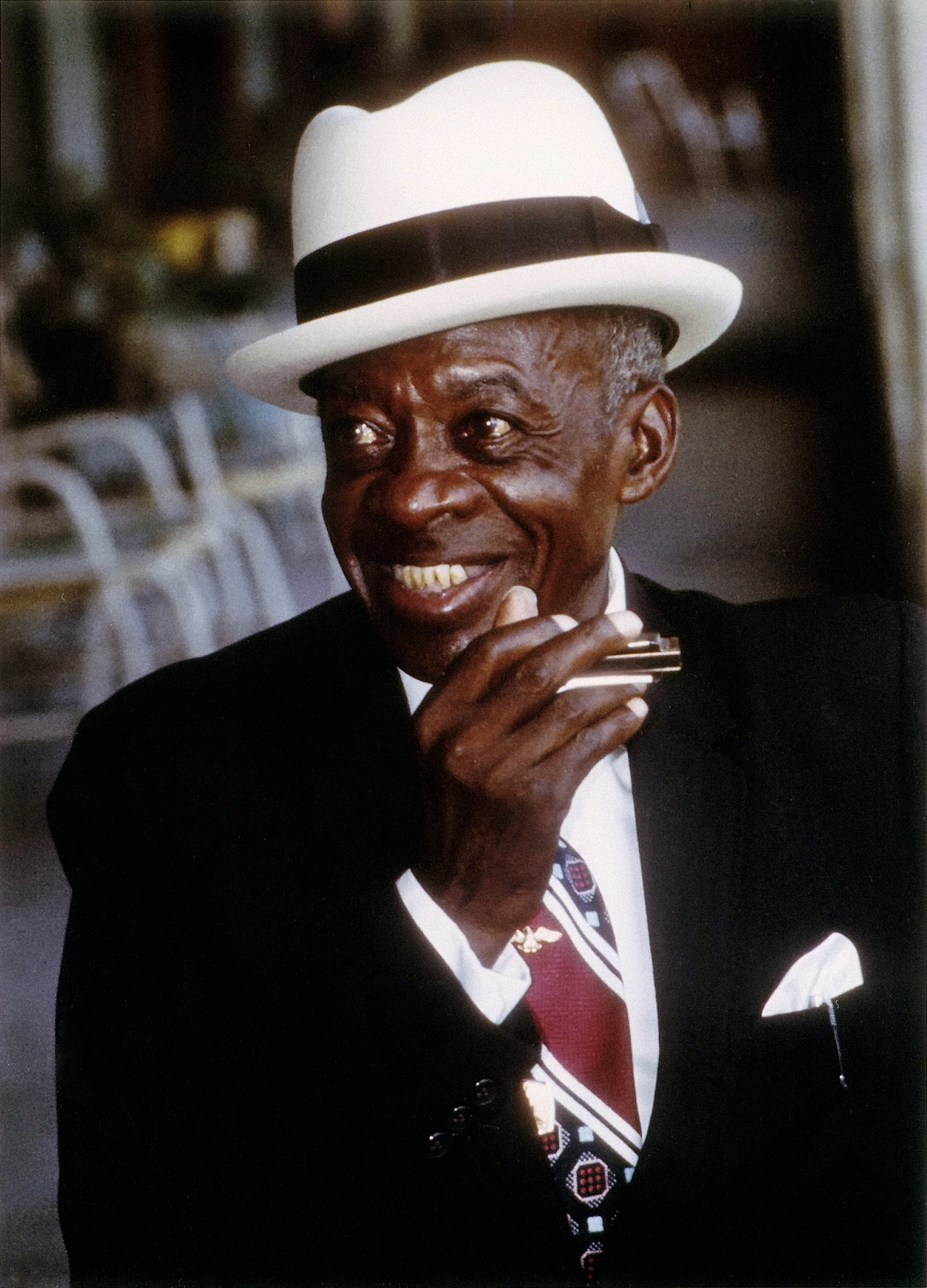
Founding member DeFord Bailey was the Opry's only black member until his 1941 departure; no others were inducted until 1993.

| No. | Name | Induction date | Notes |
|---|---|---|---|
| 1 | Uncle Jimmy Thompson^{†} | November 28, 1925 | |
| 2 | Humphrey Bate^{†} | January 2, 1926 | |
| 3 | Henry Bandy^{†} | March 13, 1926 | |
| 4 | The McGee Brothers^{†} | 1926 | |
| 5 | Mazy Todd^{†} | April 3, 1926 | |
| 6 | Uncle Dave Macon^{†} | April 17, 1926 | |
| 7 | The Pikard Family^{†} | May 8, 1926 | |
| 8 | DeFord Bailey^{†} | June 19, 1926 | Forced to retire due to WSM's cancellation of its ASCAP license in 1941. He returned in 1974, appearing sporadically until his death. His son DeFord Bailey Jr. and grandson Carlos DeFord Bailey have also appeared on the show. |
| 9 | The Crook Brothers^{†} | July 24, 1926 | Herman Crook, one of the Crook Brothers, was the last survivor of the 1920s era Opry members, maintaining his membership uninterrupted until his 1988 death—a record that would stand until Bill Anderson surpassed him in 2023. |
| 10 | Sid Harkreader^{†} | July 24, 1926 | |
| 11 | Binkley Brothers' Dixie Clodhoppers^{†} | October 30, 1926 | |
| 12 | Theron Hale and his Daughters^{†} | November 13, 1926 | |
| 13 | Arthur Smith^{†} | July 16, 1927 | |
| 14 | The Fruit Jar Drinkers^{†} | December 17, 1927 | |
| 15 | The Gully Jumpers^{†} | December 24, 1927 | |
| 16 | Kitty Cora Cline^{†} | March 24, 1928 | |
| 17 | Ed Poplin and his Barn Dance Orchestra^{†} | April 21, 1928 | |
| 18 | Uncle Joe Mangrum and Fred Schriver^{†} | July 30, 1928 | |

=== 1930s ===
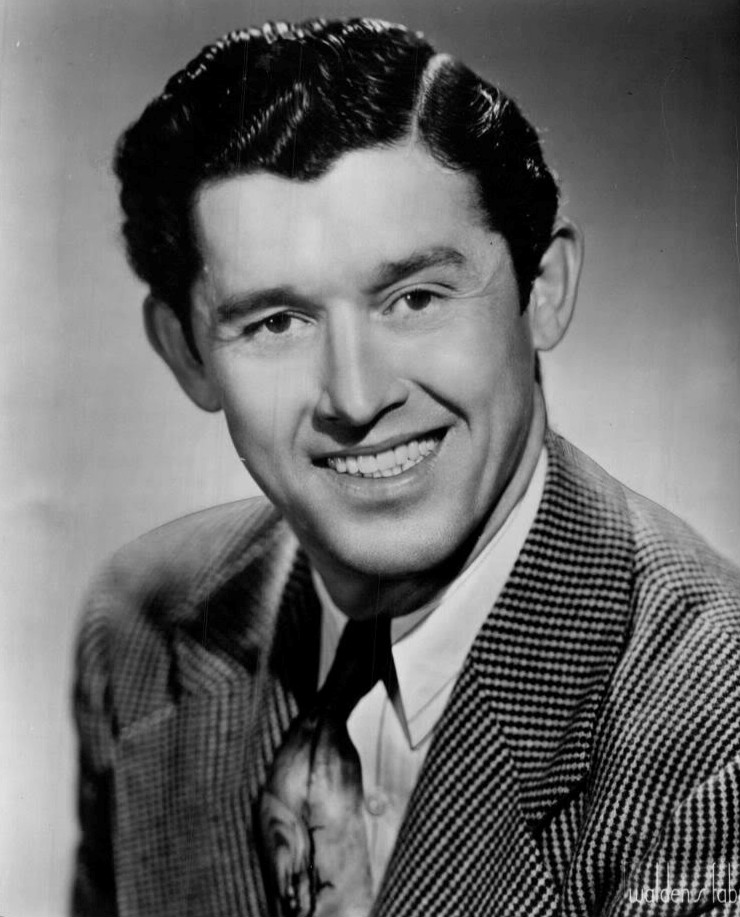
1938 inductee Roy Acuff, singer and publisher, was the public face of the Opry from the 1970s until his death.

| No. | Name | Induction date | Notes |
|---|---|---|---|
| 19 | Ford Rush^{†} | | |
| 20 | Hilltop Harmonizers^{†} | | |
| 21 | Nap and Dee^{†} | | |
| 22 | The Vagabonds^{†} | September 5, 1931 | |
| 23 | Asher and Little Jimmy Sizemore^{†} | September 24, 1932 | |
| 24 | Curly Fox^{†} | September 24, 1932 | |
| 25 | Zeke Clements^{†} | September 24, 1932 | |
| 26 | The Delmore Brothers^{†} | April 29, 1933 | |
| 27 | Robert Lunn^{†} | March 31, 1934 | |
| 28 | Lee White^{†} | April 21, 1934 | |
| 29 | Sarie and Sally^{†} | January 26, 1935 | |
| 30 | Jack Shook and his Missouri Mountaineers^{†} | February 2, 1935 | |
| 31 | The Lakeland Sisters^{†} | January 23, 1937 | |
| 32 | Bob Wills^{†} | May 22, 1937 | |
| 33 | Pee Wee King^{†} | June 27, 1937 | |
| 34 | Roy Acuff and the Smoky Mountain Boys^{†} | February 19, 1938 | Left the Opry in 1946 and returned in the early 1960s. Bashful Brother Oswald represented the Smoky Mountain Boys after Acuff's 1992 death, and was given his own formal induction in 1995. |
| 35 | Cousin Jody^{†} | | |
| 36 | Jamup and Honey^{†} | January 7, 1939 | |
| 37 | Bill Monroe^{†} | October 28, 1939 | |

=== 1940s ===
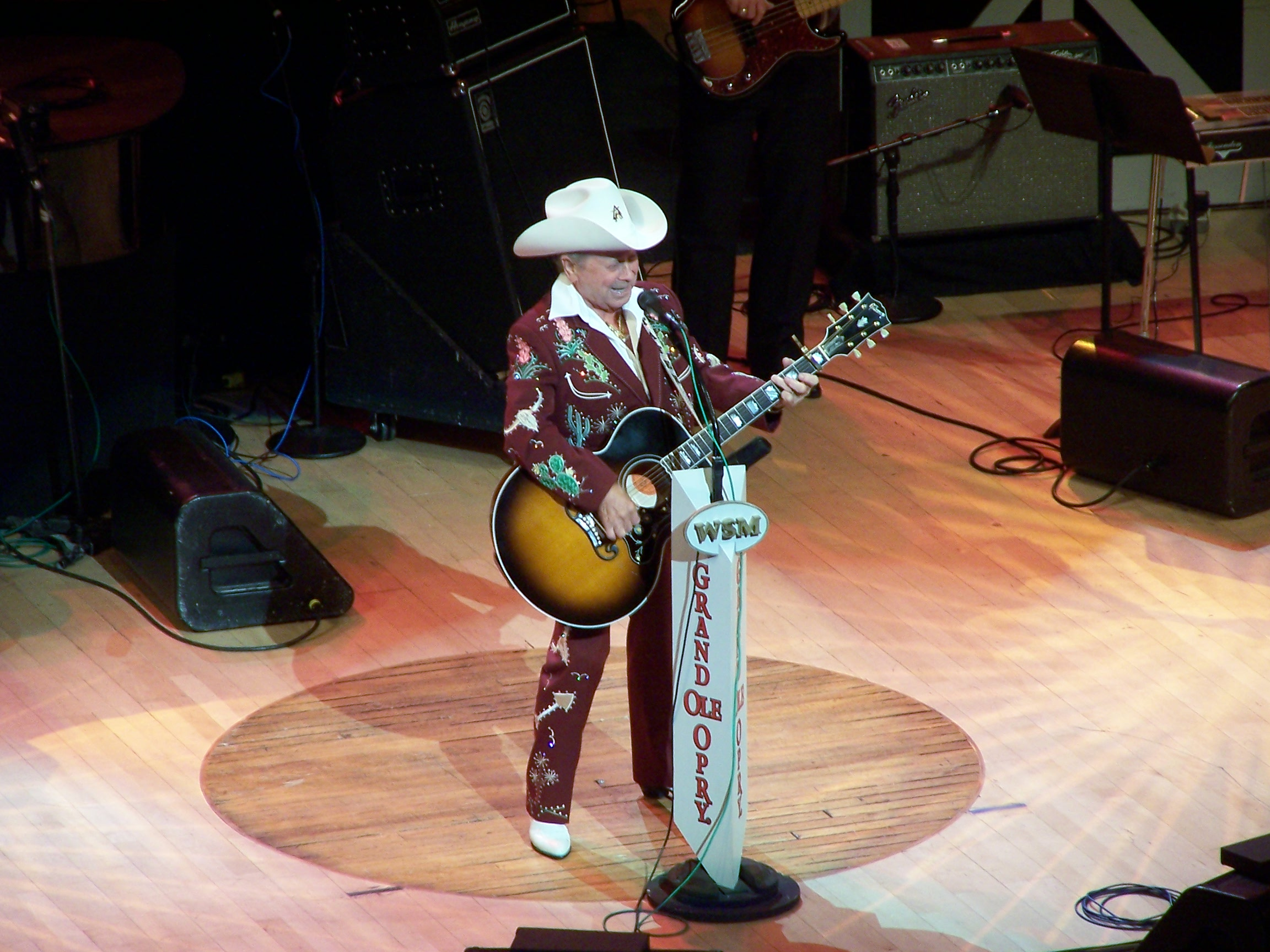
Little Jimmy Dickens was an Opry member for 67 years.

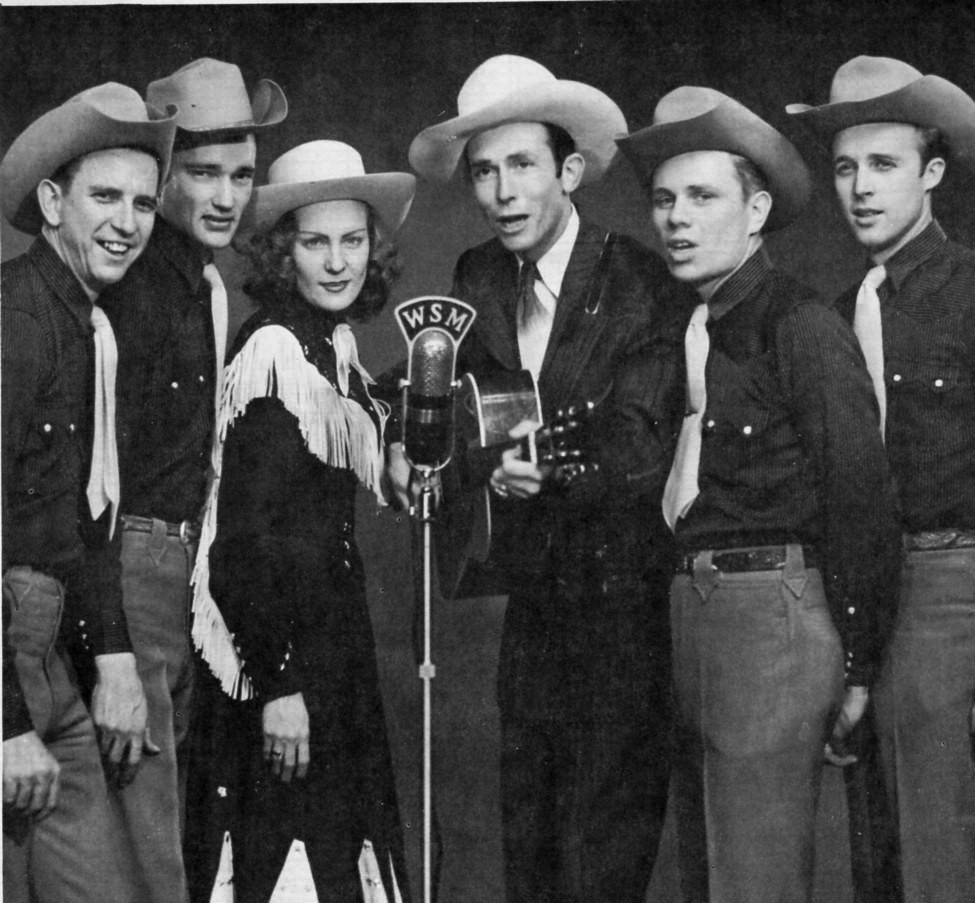
Hank Williams Sr. and the Drifting Cowboys were Opry members from 1949 to 1952.

| No. | Name | Induction date | Notes |
|---|---|---|---|
| 38 | Danny Dill^{†} | | |
| 39 | Johnnie and Jack^{†} | | |
| 40 | Milton Estes and his Musical Millers^{†} | | |
| 41 | Old Hickory Singers ^{†} | | |
| 42 | Minnie Pearl^{†} | November 30, 1940 | |
| 43 | The Duke of Paducah^{†} | 1942 | |
| 44 | John Daniel Quartet^{†} | 1942 | Included among its members Wally Fowler, who was inducted with his own group in 1945 (see below). |
| 45 | Eddy Arnold^{†} | 1943 | Relinquished membership in 1948 when he launched his own radio show on CBS. |
| 46 | Cowboy Copas^{†} | 1943 | |
| 47 | Ernest Tubb^{†} | February 13, 1943 | |
| 48 | Curley Williams^{†} | September 4, 1943 | |
| 49 | The Bailes Brothers^{†} | 1944 | |
| 50 | The DeZurik Sisters^{†} | 1944 | |
| 51 | The Poe Sisters^{†} | June 17, 1944 | |
| 52 | Rod Brasfield^{†} | July 15, 1944 | |
| 53 | David "Stringbean" Akeman^{†} | 1945 | |
| 54 | Lew Childre Sr.^{†} | 1945 | |
| 55 | Bradley Kincaid^{†} | 1945 | |
| 56 | Wally Fowler and the Oak Ridge Quintet^{†} | January 27, 1945 | Fowler was already a de facto member by way of his membership in the John Daniel Quartet. The Oak Ridge Quintet was a direct predecessor to the group now known as The Oak Ridge Boys. All of its personnel were replaced by the time Fowler sold the rights to the name to Smitty Gatlin in 1957. Gatlin left in 1966, replaced by current Oak Ridge Boys lead Duane Allen. The modern-era version of the group was inducted in 2011. |
| 57 | Jimmy Wakely^{†} | September 29, 1945 | |
| 58 | The Willis Brothers^{†} | 1946 | |
| 59 | Grandpa Jones^{†} | March 16, 1946 | |
| 60 | Red Foley^{†} | April 13, 1946 | |
| 61 | Lonzo and Oscar^{†} | 1947 | |
| 62 | Paul Howard and the Arkansas Cotton Pickers^{†} | 1947 | |
| 63 | George Morgan^{†} | September 25, 1948 | |
| 64 | Little Jimmy Dickens^{†} | November 6, 1948 | Membership lapsed from 1957 to 1975 |
| 65 | Jordanaires^{†} | 1949 | Membership lapsed prior to 1998. The group formally disbanded with the death of its last founding member in 2013, but reunited in 2023. One member from its period of flourishing, bass vocalist Ray Walker, survives. |
| 66 | Hank Williams and the Drifting Cowboys^{†} | June 11, 1949 | Dismissed and membership revoked August 11, 1952, for habitual drunkenness and missing shows. The Cowboys eventually rejoined by becoming Ray Price's backing band, with Price eventually evolving the group into the Cherokee Cowboys. |

=== 1950s ===
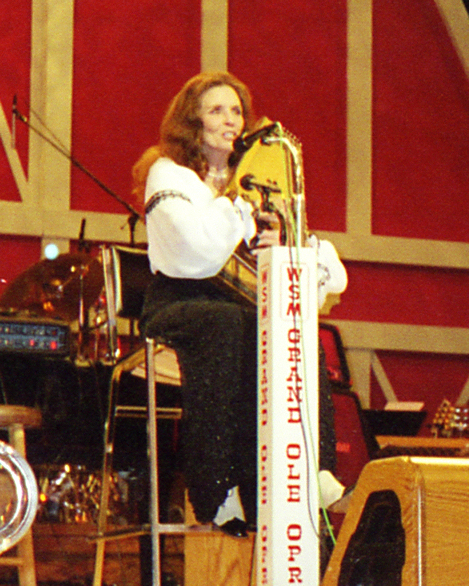
June Carter Cash, the last member of the Carter Sisters to pass, performing at the Opry in 1999.

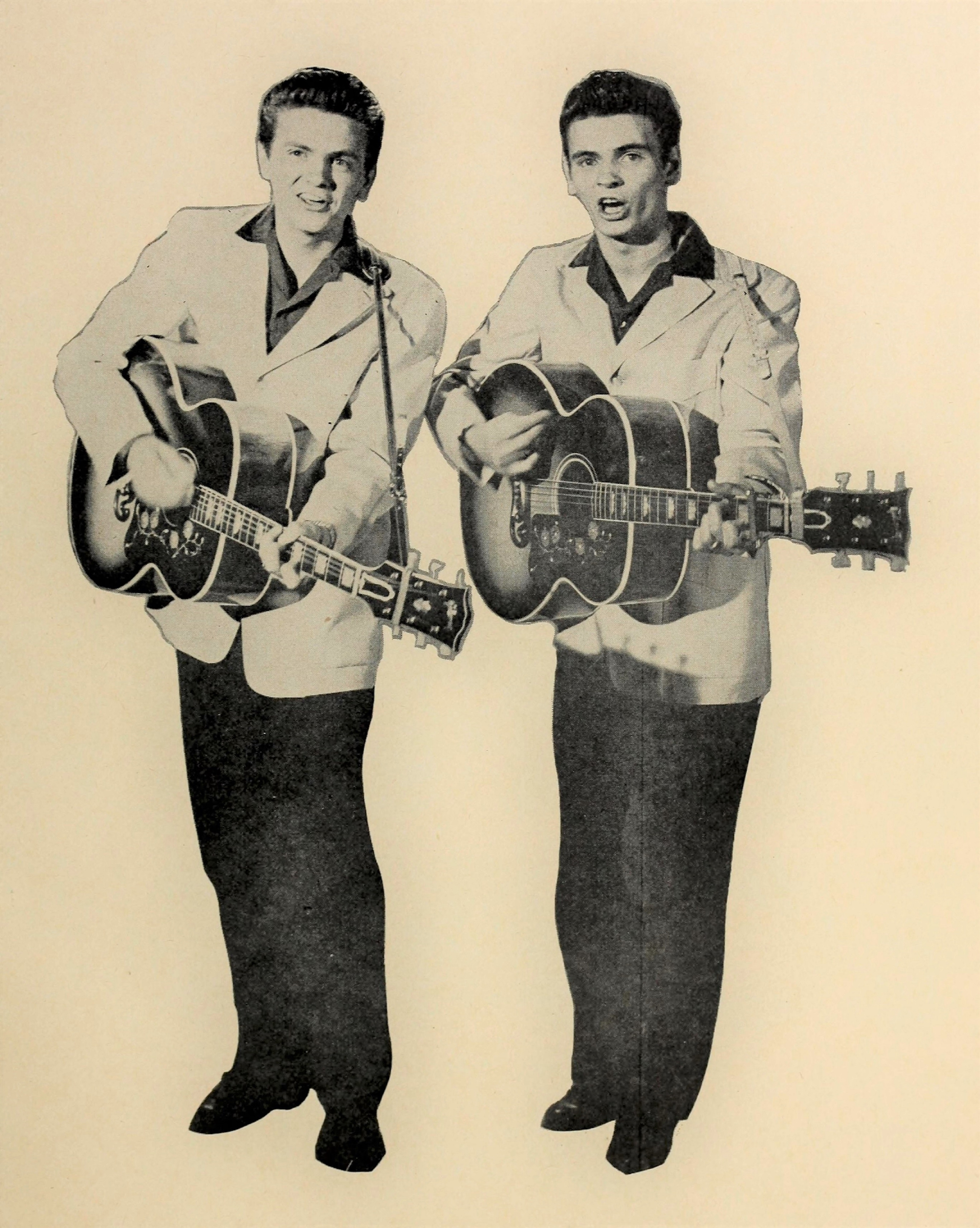
The Everly Brothers were briefly members in 1957. They left the same year to tour with Buddy Holly, remarking in 1960 that their style no longer fit the program.

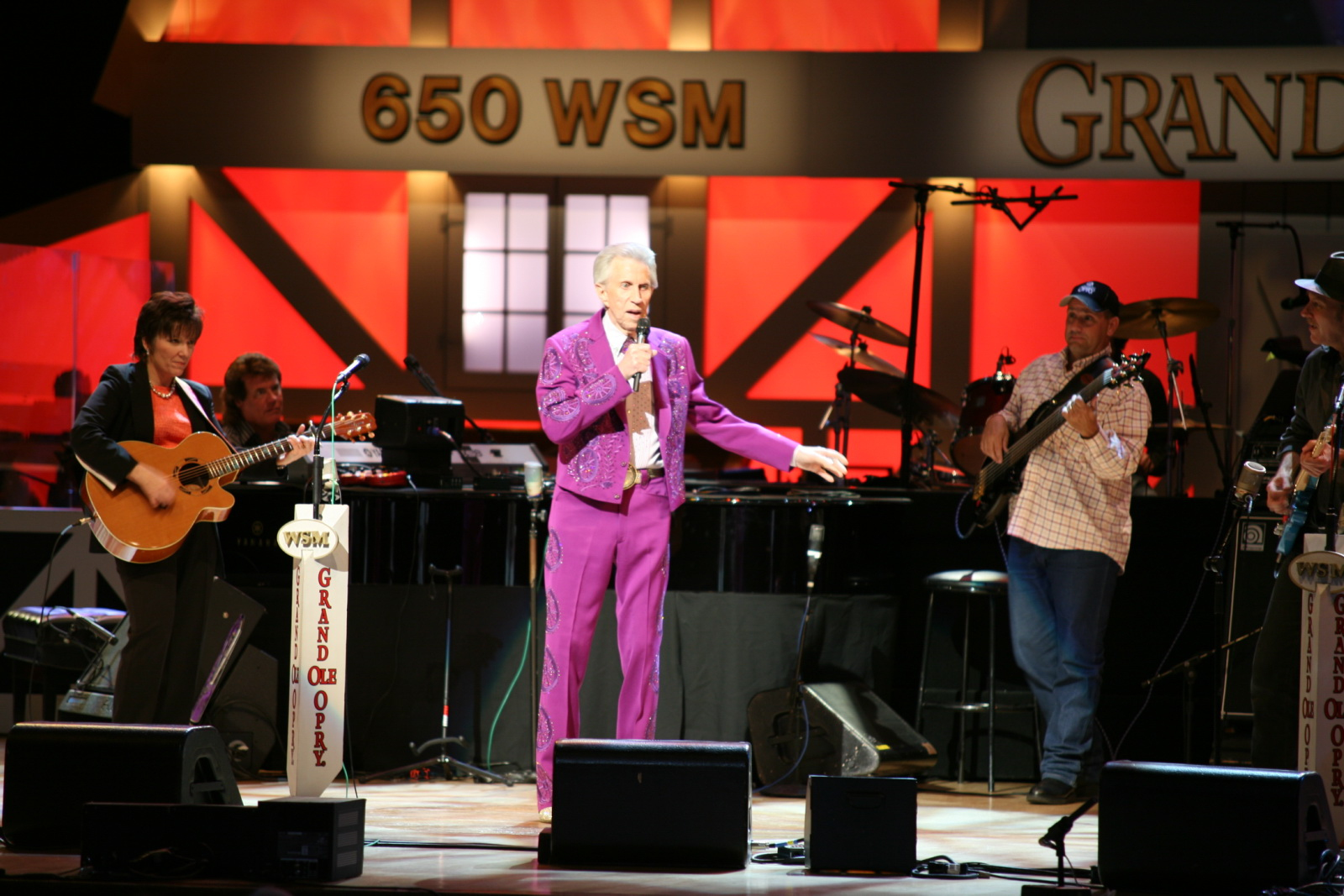
Porter Wagoner performing at the Opry in 2007.

| No. | Name | Induction date | Notes |
|---|---|---|---|
| 67 | Chet Atkins^{†} | 1950 | |
| 68 | Kitty Wells^{†} | 1952 | |
| 69 | Hawkshaw Hawkins^{†} | June 1955 | |
| 70 | Goldie Hill^{†} | August 22, 1953 | |
| 71 | The Ladells^{†} | 1955 | |
| 72 | Red Sovine^{†} | 1955 | |
| 73 | Ray Price^{†} | 1951 | |
| 74 | Hank Snow^{†} | January 7, 1950 | Inducted by Ernest Tubb |
| 75 | Carl Smith^{†} | April 29, 1950 | Relinquished membership in 1956 following his divorce from June Carter. |
| 76 | The Carter Sisters and Mother Maybelle^{†} | May 13, 1950 | Billed as the Carter Family after 1960. June Carter Cash represented the family following the death of the other members; her children John and Carlene have made occasional appearances but did not maintain membership for the group. |
| 77 | Moon Mullican^{†} | 1951 | |
| 78 | Lefty Frizzell^{†} | July 21, 1951 | |
| 79 | Martha Carson^{†} | April 26, 1952 | |
| 80 | Opry Square Dancers (sui generis) | July 5, 1952 | Originally inducted as Ralph Sloan and his Tennessee Travelers. The Opry's square-dance troupe has gone through several incarnations through its history and is a regular fixture on shows. Ralph's younger brother Melvin Sloan ran the troupe from Ralph's death in 1980 until his 2002 retirement. It merged with the other square-dance troupe, Ben Smathers and his Stoney Mountain Cloggers, when Smathers died in 1990. Originally included as full standing members, the Opry took over the troupe after Melvin's retirement and granted it a sui generis status separate from the other members. The last dancer from the Ralph Sloan era, Eddie Oliver, retired in 2016. The Opry Square Dancers regularly appear on the Saturday show only, rarely performing on other nights (typically only for special occasions). |
| 81 | Webb Pierce^{†} | September 13, 1952 | |
| 82 | Marty Robbins^{†} | January 19, 1953 | |
| 83 | Carl Butler^{†} | October 17, 1953 | |
| 84 | Del Wood^{†} | November 13, 1953 | |
| 85 | The Carlisles^{†} | November 14, 1953 | |
| 86 | Ferlin Husky^{†} | June 12, 1954 | |
| 87 | Faron Young^{†} | November 19, 1954 | |
| 88 | Lester Flatt and Earl Scruggs^{†} | January 1, 1955 | |
| 89 | The Louvin Brothers^{†} | February 26, 1955 | Ira Louvin left in 1963 (and died in 1965); Charlie Louvin represented the duo until his own death. |
| 90 | Justin Tubb^{†} | September 10, 1955 | |
| 91 | Jim Reeves^{†} | October 22, 1955 | |
| 92 | Slim Whitman^{†} | October 29, 1955 | |
| 93 | Jean Shepard^{†} | November 21, 1955 | |
| 94 | Johnny Cash^{†} | July 7, 1956 | Expelled in 1965 for breaking the stage lights with his microphone stand during an Opry performance. Reconciled in 1968 and remained a member the rest of his life. |
| 95 | Jimmy C. Newman^{†} | August 4, 1956 | |
| 96 | George Jones^{†} | August 25, 1956 | |
| 97 | Rose Maddox^{†} | September 29, 1956 | |
| 98 | Stonewall Jackson^{†} | November 3, 1956 | Filed age discrimination case in 2006 and membership was temporarily revoked. His case was settled and he returned from 2008 until his 2012 retirement due to vascular dementia; he remained a standing member until his death. |
| 99 | The Wilburn Brothers^{†} | November 10, 1956 | Briefly members in 1940, the child stars could not legally work in Tennessee and had to wait until adulthood to officially rejoin. |
| 100 | Wilma Lee Cooper^{†} | January 12, 1957 | |
| 101 | Porter Wagoner^{†} | February 23, 1957 | |
| 102 | Rusty† & Doug | May 18, 1957 | Departed prior to the duo's breakup in 1963. |
| 103 | The Everly Brothers^{†} | 1957 | Disowned the Opry and dissolved their membership in 1960. |
| 104 | Margie Bowes^{†} | 1958 | |
| 105 | Archie Campbell^{†} | 1958 | |
| 106 | Don Gibson^{†} | May 20, 1958 | |
| 107 | Ben Smathers and the Stoney Mountain Cloggers^{†} | September 13, 1958 | Merged with the Melvin Sloan Dancers in 1990 (now the Opry Square Dancers - see No. 80, above). |
| 108 | Billy Grammer^{†} | February 27, 1959 | |
| 109 | Roy Drusky^{†} | June 13, 1959 | |
| 110 | Skeeter Davis^{†} | August 4, 1959 | |

=== 1960s ===
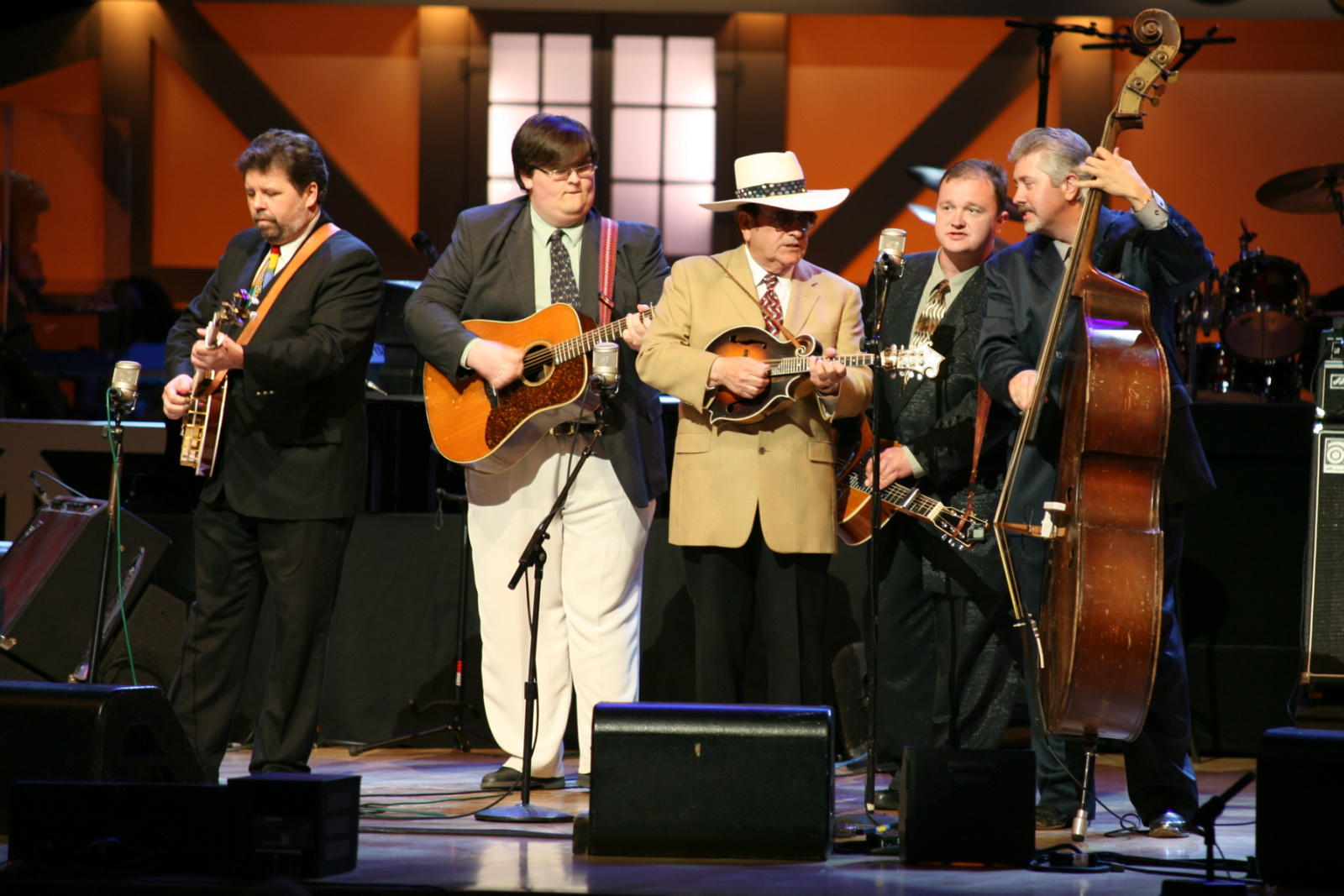
Bobby Osborne and the Rocky Top X-Press playing the Opry.

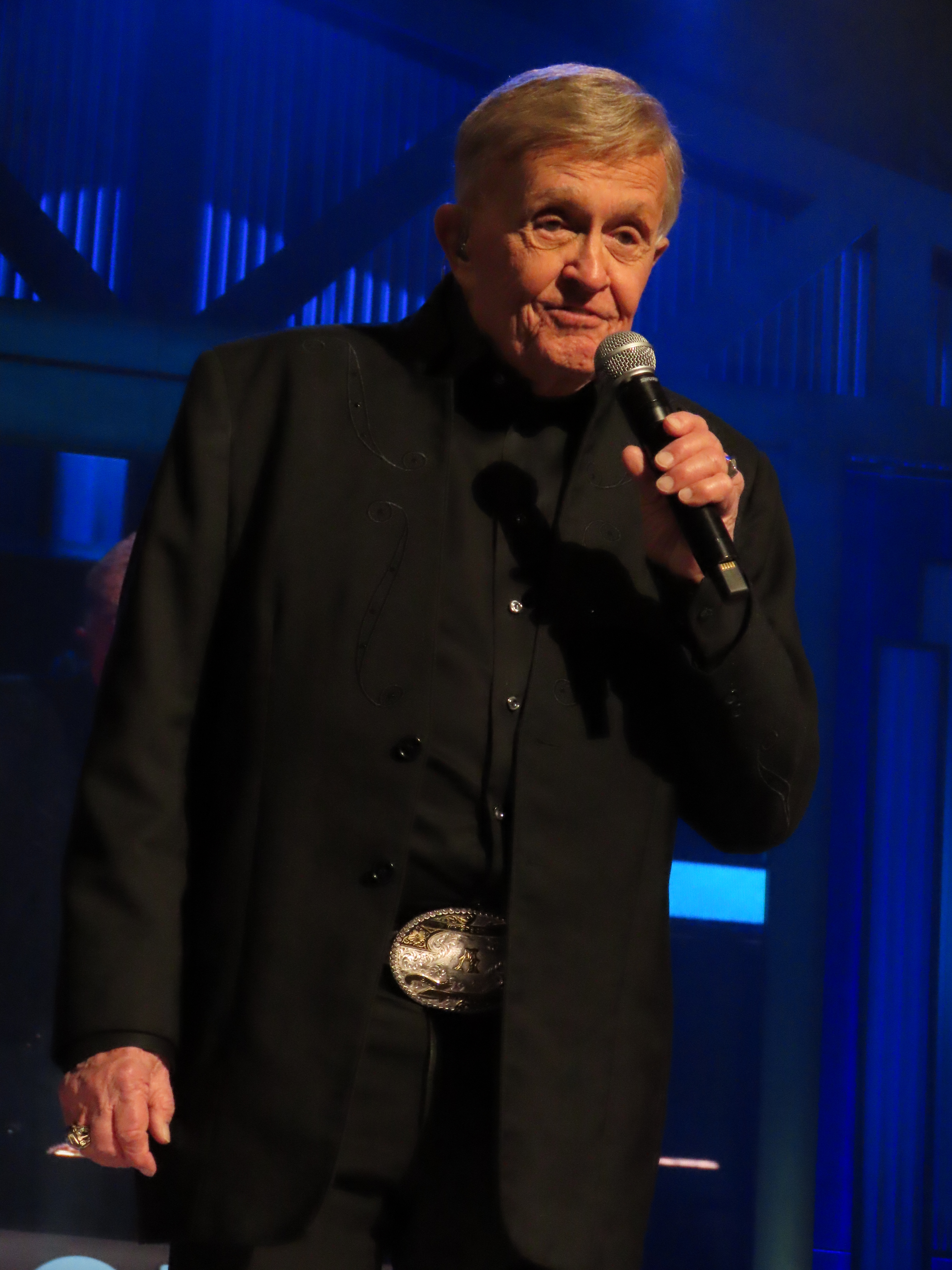
Bill Anderson, the longest serving member in Opry history, performing in 2022.

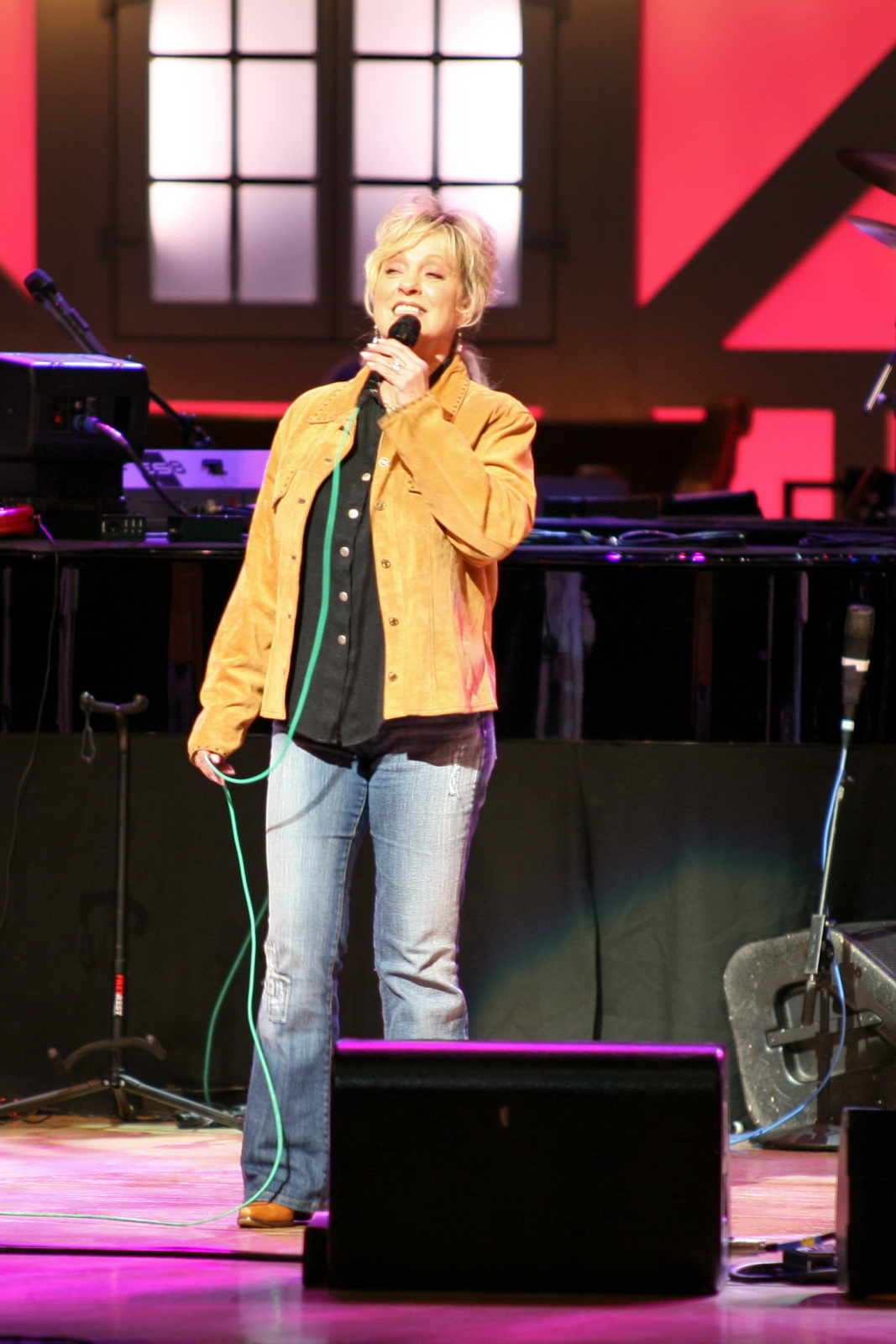
Opry star Connie Smith performing in 2007.

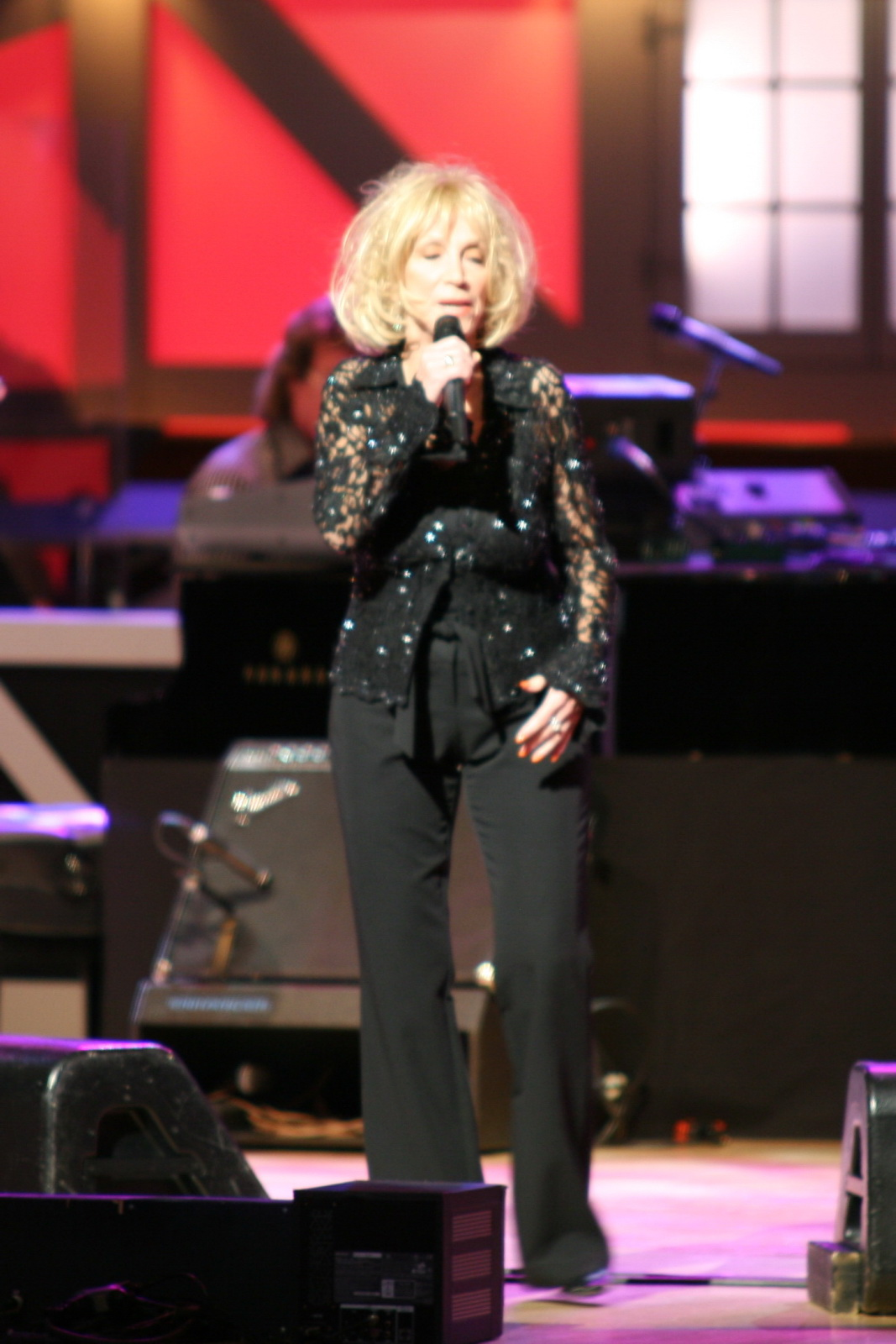
Jeannie Seely was the first woman to host a segment of the Opry and appeared more times than any other performer—over 5,000 times in 58 years.

| No. | Name | Induction date | Notes |
|---|---|---|---|
| 111 | Jimmy Driftwood^{†} | | Membership lapsed before 1997, most likely in 1975 when he retired and returned to his home state of Arkansas. |
| 112 | Tompall and the Glaser Brothers^{†} | | Last performance was in 1990. |
| 113 | Bobby Lord^{†} | 1960 | |
| 114 | Billy Walker^{†} | January 1, 1960 | |
| 115 | Patsy Cline^{†} | January 9, 1960 | |
| 116 | George Hamilton IV^{†} | February 6, 1960 | |
| 117 | Hank Locklin^{†} | November 12, 1960 | |
| 118 | Bill Anderson | July 15, 1961 | With 64 years of continuous service as of July 2025, Anderson is the longest-serving member in the Opry's history. |
| 119 | Loretta Lynn^{†} | September 25, 1962 | |
| 120 | Leroy Van Dyke | October 20, 1962 | Membership lapsed prior to 1998; still makes occasional appearances. |
| 121 | Sonny James^{†} | October 27, 1962 | |
| 122 | Marion Worth^{†} | 1963 | |
| 123 | The Browns^{†} | August 17, 1963 | Jim Ed Brown continued to hold Opry membership from the group's breakup in 1967 until his 2015 death. |
| 124 | Jim & Jesse^{†} | March 2, 1964 | Represented by Jesse McReynolds from Jim's death in 2002 until his own death in 2023. |
| 125 | Ernie Ashworth^{†} | March 7, 1964 | |
| 126 | The Osborne Brothers^{†} | August 8, 1964 | Represented by Bobby Osborne and Rocky Top X-Press from Sonny Osborne's retirement in 2005 until Bobby Osborne's death in 2023. |
| 127 | Dottie West^{†} | August 8, 1964 | |
| 128 | Willie Nelson | November 28, 1964 | Resigned his membership in 1972 after relocating to Texas. |
| 129 | Norma Jean | January 9, 1965 | Mostly retired from the music industry after 1973. |
| 130 | Tex Ritter^{†} | June 12, 1965 | |
| 131 | Connie Smith | August 21, 1965 | |
| 132 | Bob Luman^{†} | September 18, 1965 | |
| 133 | Ray Pillow^{†} | April 30, 1966 | Did not perform in the later years of his life, but remained a standing member until his 2023 death. |
| 134 | Del Reeves^{†} | October 14, 1966 | |
| 135 | The Four Guys^{‡} | April 22, 1967 | Disbanded in 1999. An attempt to continue the group's membership with a new lineup was rejected by Opry management and the group was formally expelled in 2000. Sam Wellington, the lone surviving member of the quartet, last appeared on the Opry stage in 2023. |
| 136 | Stu Phillips^{†} | June 1, 1967 | Last appeared on stage to sing with the chorus of members in the finale of the "Opry 100: A Live Celebration" NBC television special in 2025. |
| 137 | Charlie Walker^{†} | August 19, 1967 | |
| 138 | Jeannie Seely^{†} | September 16, 1967 | Seely performed on more Opry episodes than any other performer, appearing 5,397 times from her May 28, 1966 debut until her final performance on February 22, 2025. |
| 139 | Jack Greene^{†} | December 27, 1967 | Greene had already been a de facto member as part of Ernest Tubb's band since 1962. |
| 140 | Dolly Parton^{†} | January 4, 1969 | Parton's appearances had generally been limited to pre-recorded messages due to a heavy touring schedule and health issues since the 2020s until her death. |
| 141 | Tammy Wynette^{†} | January 4, 1969 | |

=== 1970s ===
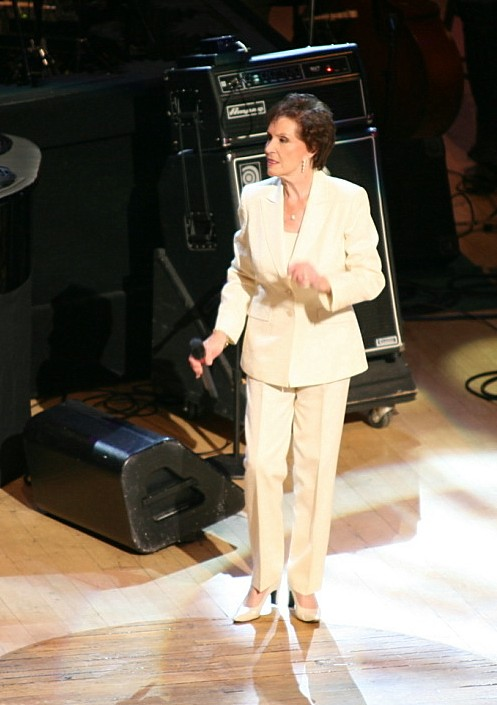
Jan Howard performing at the Opry in 2007. After the death of Little Jimmy Dickens in 2015, Howard was the oldest member of the Opry cast until her death in 2020.

| No. | Name | Induction date | Notes |
|---|---|---|---|
| 142 | Tom T. Hall^{†} | January 1, 1971 | Retired since 1996 but remained a standing member until his death. |
| 143 | Jan Howard^{†} | March 27, 1971 | |
| 144 | Freddie Hart^{†} | October 16, 1971 | |
| 145 | Barbara Mandrell | July 29, 1972 | Retired since 1997, but still listed as a standing member. Mandrell made two one-off, non-singing appearances in 2022 and 2025. |
| 146 | David Houston^{†} | August 12, 1972 | |
| 147 | Jeanne Pruett | July 21, 1973 | Retired since 2006, but still listed as a standing member. |
| 148 | Jerry Clower^{†} | October 27, 1973 | |
| 149 | Ronnie Milsap | February 6, 1976 | Retired in October 2023; still a standing member. |
| 150 | Don Williams^{†} | April 23, 1976 | |
| 151 | Larry Gatlin and the Gatlin Brothers | December 25, 1976 | Gatlin has set a planned date of retirement for May 2028. |

=== 1980s ===
Riders in the Sky have been Opry members and frequent performers since 1982.

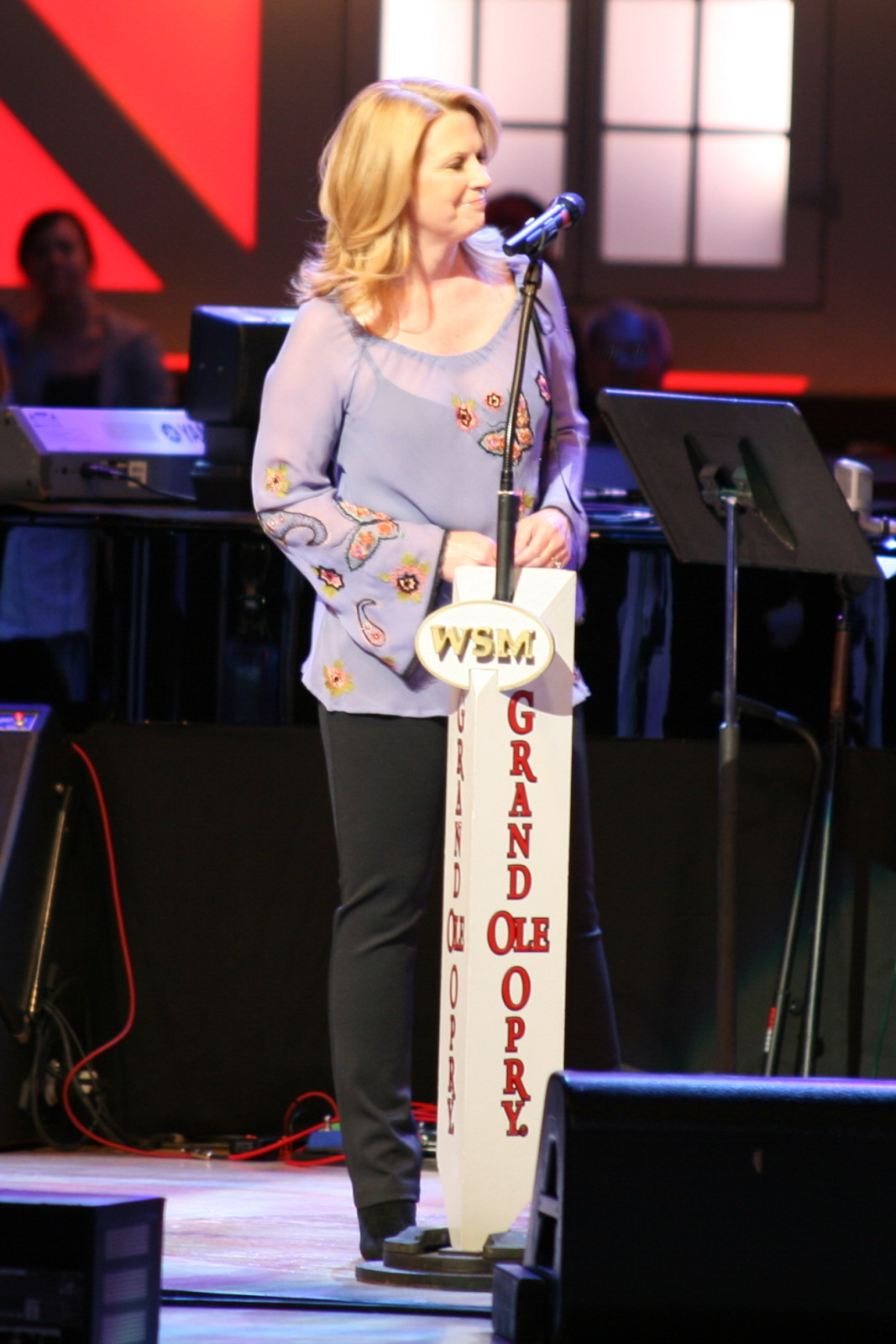
Patty Loveless performing on the Opry in 2007.

| No. | Name | Induction date | Notes |
|---|---|---|---|
| 152 | John Conlee | February 7, 1981 | |
| 153 | Boxcar Willie^{†} | February 21, 1981 | |
| 154 | B. J. Thomas^{†} | August 7, 1981 | Full-time membership lapsed prior to 1998; continued to make occasional appearances until his death. |
| 155 | Ricky Skaggs | May 15, 1982 | With backing band Kentucky Thunder since 1997. |
| 156 | Riders in the Sky | June 19, 1982 | |
| 157 | The Whites^{‡} | March 2, 1984 | Sharon and Cheryl White continue to represent the family group as a duo following the death of their father (and third group member), Buck, in 2025. |
| 158 | Lorrie Morgan | June 9, 1984 | |
| 159 | Johnny Russell^{†} | July 6, 1985 | |
| 160 | Mel McDaniel^{†} | January 11, 1986 | |
| 161 | Reba McEntire | January 17, 1986 | McEntire was invited during the Opry's 60th anniversary television special. |
| 162 | Randy Travis | December 20, 1986 | In 2013, Travis suffered a stroke that left him with severely impaired motor skills and vocal abilities. Although he is no longer able to perform, he remains an active member and occasionally makes Opry appearances to support other artists. |
| 163 | Roy Clark^{†} | August 22, 1987 | |
| 164 | Ricky Van Shelton | June 10, 1988 | Retired in 2006; still officially a standing member. |
| 165 | Patty Loveless | June 11, 1988 | Though Loveless no longer tours as a performer, she continues to occasionally perform on the Opry, typically only at specially-programmed shows. |
| | Keith Whitley^{†} | May 1989 (scheduled) | Whitley is the only person to be posthumously recognized as a former member, without ever having been an active member. Whitley died on May 9, 1989, three weeks before a scheduled Opry appearance where management was planning to surprise him with an invitation to join the cast. As the Opry has a policy only recognizing living artists as members, Whitley's induction was never made official. During a Keith Whitley tribute show at the Opry on October 14, 2023, Garth Brooks presented Whitley's widow, Opry member Lorrie Morgan, with a replica Opry member plaque engraved with Whitley's name, identical to those hanging in the Opry's member gallery backstage. |
| 166 | Holly Dunn^{†} | October 14, 1989 | Retired in 2003 and died in 2016. |

=== 1990s ===
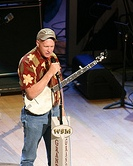
Mike Snider performing on the Opry in 2007

| No. | Name | Induction date | Invited by | Inducted by | Notes |
|---|---|---|---|---|---|
| 167 | Mike Snider | June 2, 1990 | | Minnie Pearl | |
| 168 | Garth Brooks | October 6, 1990 | | Johnny Russell | |
| 169 | Clint Black | January 10, 1991 | | Garth Brooks | Black was invited during the Opry's 65th anniversary television special. |
| 170 | Alan Jackson | June 7, 1991 | | Roy Acuff and Randy Travis | Ceased performing in 2026. |
| 171 | Vince Gill | August 10, 1991 | | Roy Acuff | |
| 172 | Emmylou Harris | January 25, 1992 | | | |
| 173 | Travis Tritt | February 29, 1992 | | | |
| 174 | Marty Stuart and The Fabulous Superlatives | November 28, 1992 | | | |
| 175 | Charley Pride^{†} | May 1, 1993 | | Jimmy C. Newman | |
| 176 | Alison Krauss and Union Station | July 3, 1993 | | Garth Brooks | |
| 177 | Joe Diffie^{†} | November 27, 1993 | | | |
| 178 | Hal Ketchum^{†} | January 22, 1994 | | Little Jimmy Dickens | |
| 179 | Bashful Brother Oswald^{†} | January 21, 1995 | | Marty Stuart | Oswald was a de facto Opry member as the last original member of Roy Acuff's backing band, the Smoky Mountain Boys. Following Acuff's death in November 1992, Oswald assumed leadership of the band as it continued performing on Opry shows, leading to his formal induction just over two years later. |
| 180 | Martina McBride | November 30, 1995 | | Loretta Lynn | |
| 181 | Steve Wariner | May 11, 1996 | Bob Whittaker | | |
| 182 | Johnny Paycheck^{†} | 1997 | Bob Whittaker | Porter Wagoner and Johnny Russell | |
| 183 | Diamond Rio | April 18, 1998 | Bob Whittaker | Little Jimmy Dickens | Gene Johnson & Brian Prout retired in 2022, and were replaced by Micah Schweinsberg and Carson McKee |
| 184 | Trisha Yearwood | March 13, 1999 | Ricky Skaggs | Porter Wagoner | |

=== 2000s ===
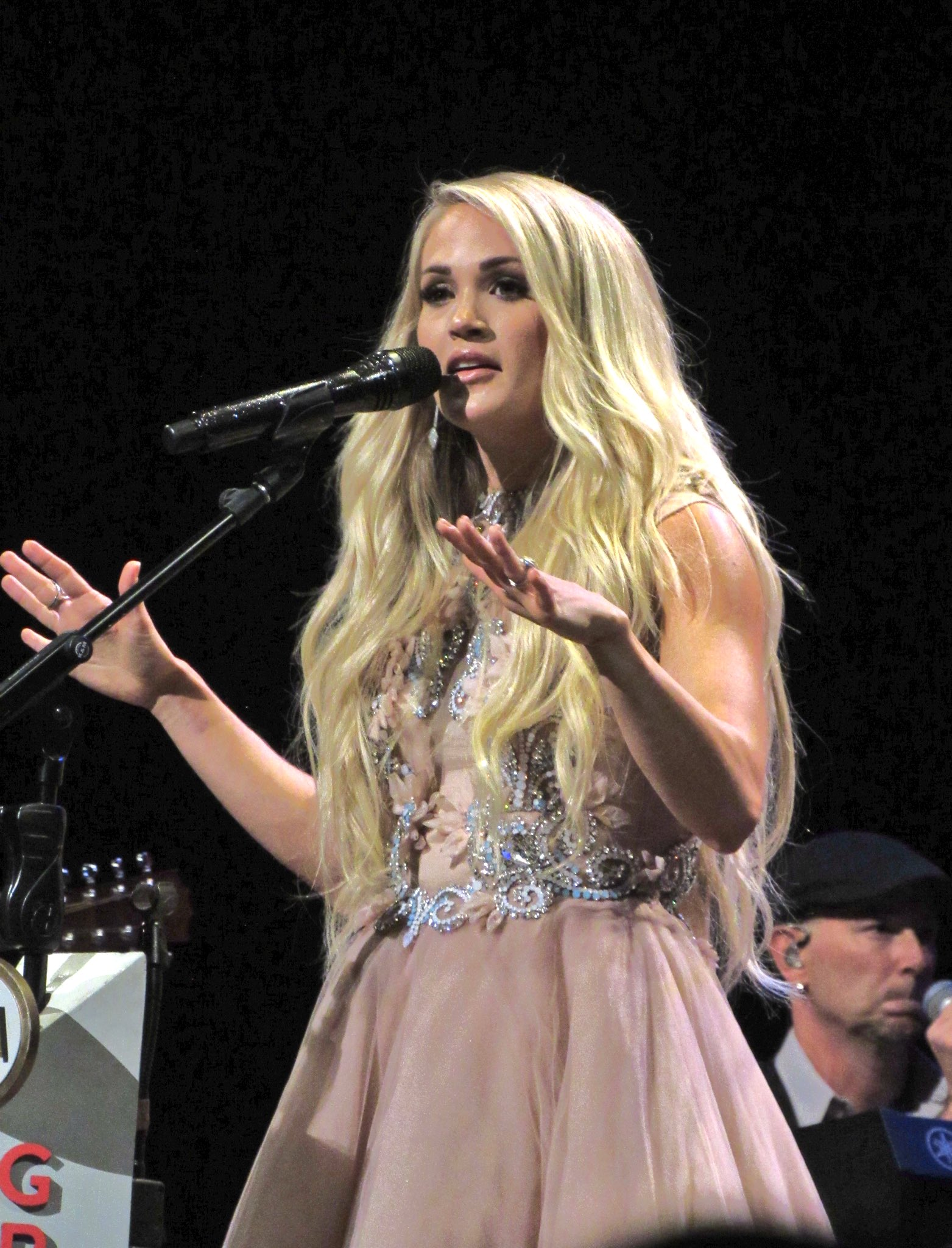
Carrie Underwood singing at the Opry in 2018

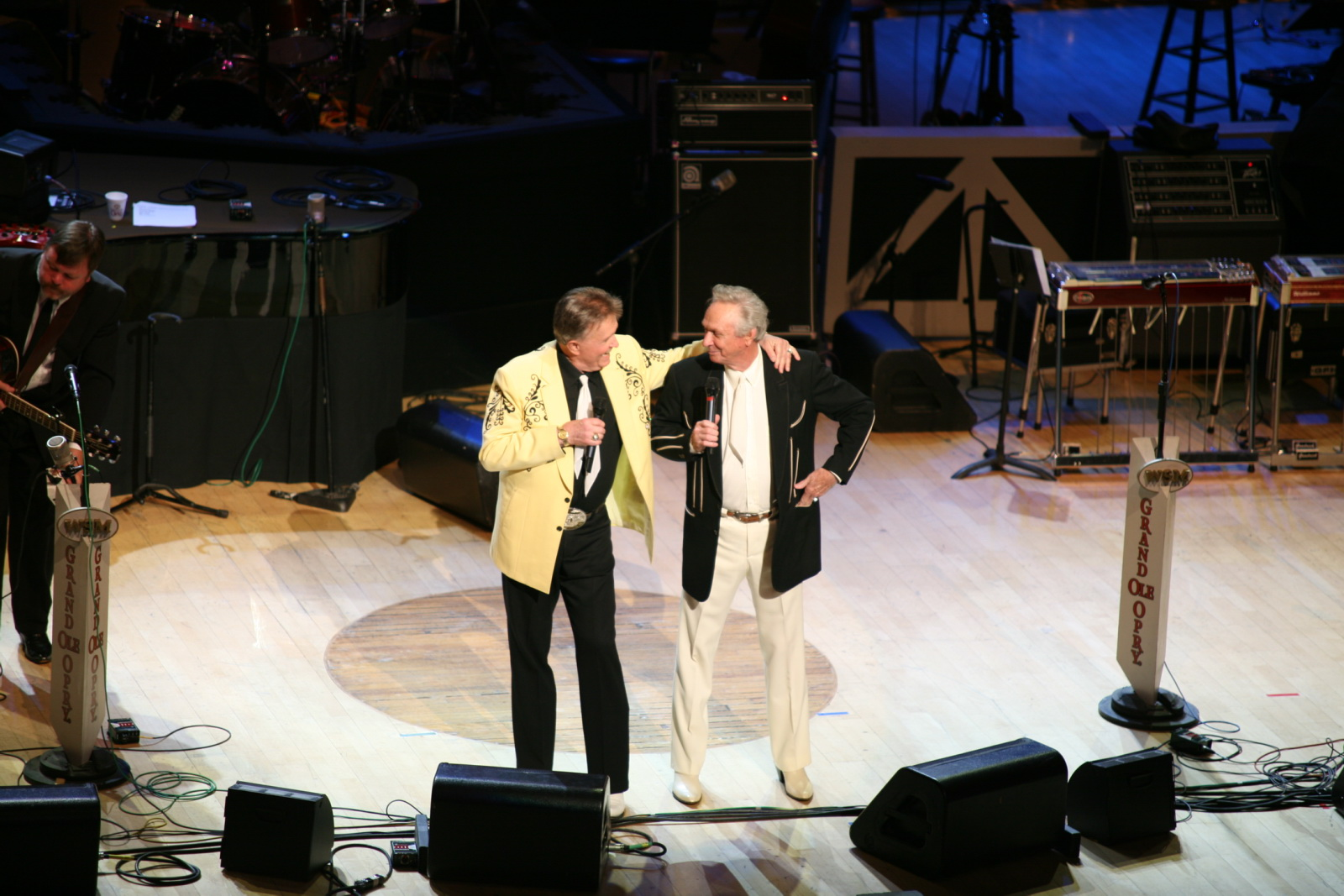
1961 inductee Bill Anderson, the Opry's longest-tenured active member as of 2021, inducts his friend Mel Tillis into the Opry in 2007.

| No. | Name | Induction date | Invited by | Inducted by | Notes |
|---|---|---|---|---|---|
| 185 | Ralph Stanley and the Clinch Mountain Boys^{†} | January 15, 2000 | Patty Loveless and Porter Wagoner | | |
| 186 | Pam Tillis | August 26, 2000 | Little Jimmy Dickens | Marty Stuart | |
| 187 | Brad Paisley | February 17, 2001 | Bill Anderson, Jeannie Seely and Little Jimmy Dickens | Steve Wariner | |
| 188 | Trace Adkins | August 23, 2003 | Little Jimmy Dickens | Ronnie Milsap and Lorrie Morgan | |
| 189 | Del McCoury | October 25, 2003 | | Patty Loveless | |
| 190 | Terri Clark | June 12, 2004 | Steve Wariner | Marty Stuart, Pam Tillis, and Patty Loveless | |
| 191 | Dierks Bentley | October 1, 2005 | Marty Stuart | | In the late 1990s, when Bentley worked for the Opry's TV network (TNN) as a researcher, he was barred from entering the Opry House after abusing his backstage privileges as a company employee. The "ban" was lifted in 2003, when he was asked to perform. |
| 192 | Mel Tillis^{†} | June 9, 2007 | Bill Anderson | Pam Tillis | Mel Tillis became the first Opry member inducted by their own child when his daughter, Pam, did the honors. |
| 193 | Josh Turner | October 27, 2007 | Roy Clark | Vince Gill | |
| 194 | Charlie Daniels^{†} | January 19, 2008 | Martina McBride | Marty Stuart and Connie Smith | |
| 195 | Carrie Underwood | May 10, 2008 | Randy Travis | Garth Brooks | |
| 196 | Craig Morgan | October 25, 2008 | John Conlee | | Morgan was performing Conlee's hit "Rose Colored Glasses" during a concert at Fort Bragg when Conlee surprised him on stage with the invitation. |
| 197 | Montgomery Gentry^{‡} | June 23, 2009 | Charlie Daniels | Marty Stuart and Little Jimmy Dickens | Eddie Montgomery has represented the duo as a solo performer since Troy Gentry's 2017 death. |

=== 2010s ===
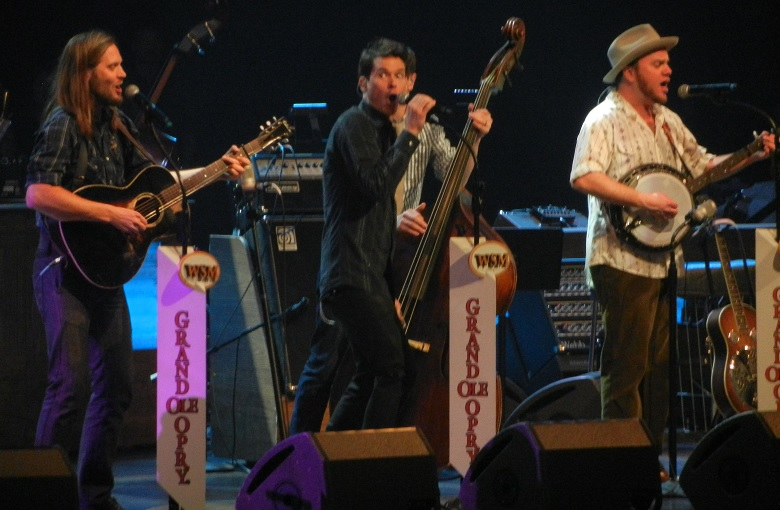
Old Crow Medicine Show performing at their induction in 2013

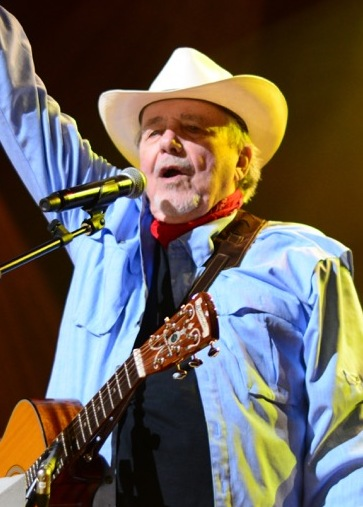
Bobby Bare was a member from 1964 to 1974, then rejoined in 2018.

| No. | Name | Induction date | Invited by | Inducted by | Notes |
|---|---|---|---|---|---|
| 198 | Blake Shelton | October 23, 2010 | Trace Adkins | | Shelton was invited to join the cast during the Opry's first show at the Grand Ole Opry House following nearly five months of flood remediation. |
| 199 | The Oak Ridge Boys^{‡} | August 6, 2011 | Little Jimmy Dickens | | Two of the four members remain from their 2011 induction: Ben James replaced Joe Bonsall shortly before Bonsall's death in 2024, while Richard Sterban died in 2026. |
| 200 | Rascal Flatts | October 8, 2011 | Vince Gill | Little Jimmy Dickens | Disbanded from 2020 to 2024; Gary LeVox and Jay DeMarcus continued to appear separately and maintain the group's membership in that span. |
| 201 | Keith Urban | April 21, 2012 | Vince Gill, Rascal Flatts, and The Oak Ridge Boys | Trace Adkins and Josh Turner | |
| 202 | Darius Rucker | October 16, 2012 | Brad Paisley | Vince Gill and Keith Urban | |
| 203 | Old Crow Medicine Show | September 17, 2013 | Marty Stuart | Marty Stuart and Dierks Bentley | Only Ketch Secor, Morgan Jahnig, and Cory Younts remain from the band's roster on its induction date |
| 204 | Little Big Town | October 17, 2014 | Reba McEntire | Vince Gill and Little Jimmy Dickens | |
| 205 | Crystal Gayle | January 21, 2017 | Carrie Underwood | Loretta Lynn | |
| 206 | Dailey & Vincent | March 11, 2017 | Marty Stuart | Old Crow Medicine Show and Jeannie Seely | Darrin Vincent had previously been a de facto member as part of Ricky Skaggs's Kentucky Thunder until 2008. |
| 207 | Chris Young | October 17, 2017 | Vince Gill | Brad Paisley | |
| 208 | Chris Janson | March 20, 2018 | Keith Urban | Garth Brooks | |
| 209 | Bobby Bare | April 7, 2018 | | Garth Brooks | Original induction date was August 14, 1964. Membership lapsed 1974. Inducted again by Brooks in 2018. |
| 210 | Dustin Lynch | September 18, 2018 | Trace Adkins | Reba McEntire | |
| 211 | Mark Wills | January 11, 2019 | Vince Gill | Craig Morgan | |
| 212 | Kelsea Ballerini | April 16, 2019 | Little Big Town | Carrie Underwood | 25 years old at her induction, Ballerini became the youngest solo performer to become an Opry member, a record she holds as of 2025. |
| 213 | Luke Combs | July 16, 2019 | Craig Morgan, Chris Janson, and John Conlee | Joe Diffie and Vince Gill | |

=== 2020s ===
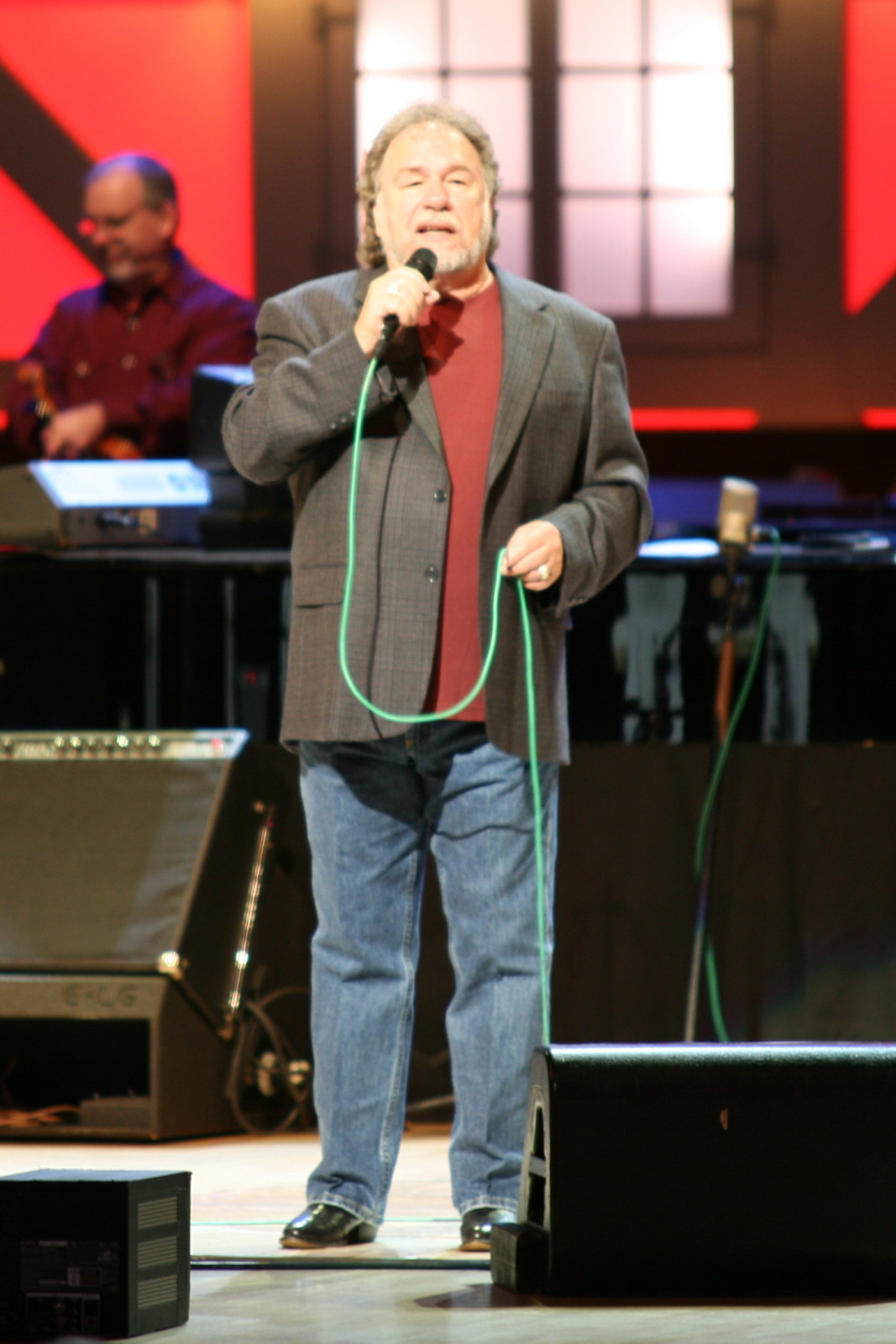
Gene Watson, the sole new member in 2020, performing on the Opry in 2007

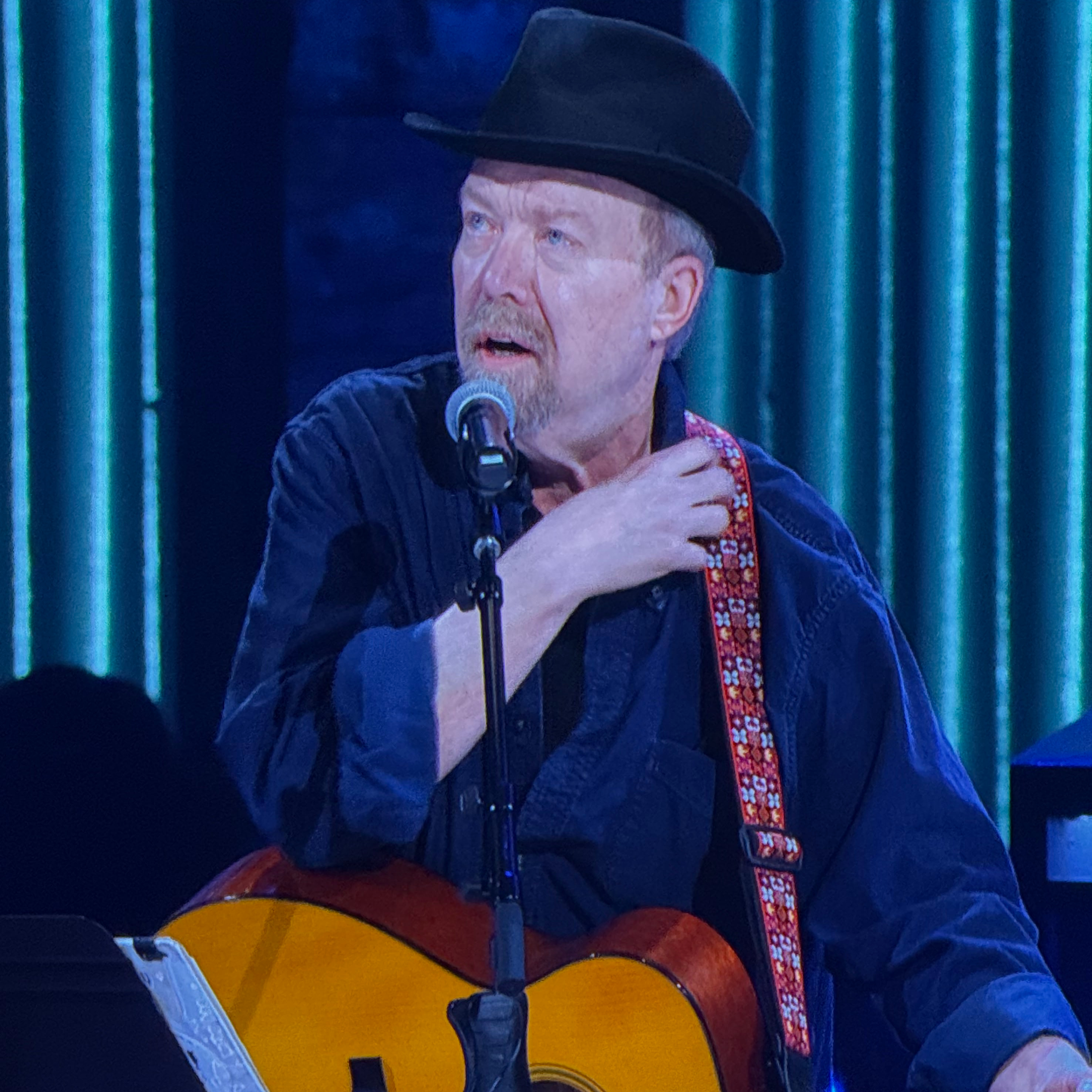
Don Schlitz was a member from 2022 until his death in 2026. A member of multiple songwriting halls of fame but never a touring performer, Schlitz is the only person in the show's history to hold Opry membership on the strength of songwriting alone.

| No. | Name | Induction date | Invited by | Inducted by | Notes |
|---|---|---|---|---|---|
| 214 | Gene Watson | February 7, 2020 | Vince Gill | Steve Wariner | |
| 215 | Lady A | January 21, 2021 | Darius Rucker | | Inducted immediately upon invitation, as part of a filming of NBC’s 2021 special, Grand Ole Opry: 95 Years of Country Music |
| 216 | Rhonda Vincent | February 6, 2021 | Jeannie Seely | Dierks Bentley | Delayed from her originally scheduled March 24, 2020 induction date due to the Coronavirus pandemic |
| 217 | Carly Pearce | August 3, 2021 | Dolly Parton | Trisha Yearwood | Pearce was led to believe she was recording a video advertisement for Dollywood when Parton appeared on set and surprised her with the invitation. |
| 218 | The Isaacs | September 14, 2021 | Ricky Skaggs | The Whites and Ricky Skaggs | |
| 219 | Mandy Barnett | November 2, 2021 | Connie Smith | Marty Stuart and Connie Smith | |
| 220 | Lauren Alaina | February 12, 2022 | Trisha Yearwood | | Dolly Parton delivered a recorded video message as part of the induction ceremony |
| 221 | Jamey Johnson | May 14, 2022 | Bill Anderson | | |
| 222 | Charlie McCoy | July 13, 2022 | Vince Gill | Larry Gatlin | In a first for the Opry, Vince Gill extended two separate invitations during the same show when, on June 11, 2022, he first invited McCoy and then returned to invite Schlitz. |
| 223 | Don Schlitz^{†} | August 30, 2022 | Vince Gill | Vince Gill and Randy Travis | In a first for the Opry, Vince Gill extended two separate invitations during the same show when, on June 11, 2022, he first invited McCoy and then returned to invite Schlitz. |
| 224 | Ashley McBryde | December 10, 2022 | Garth Brooks | Terri Clark | McBryde was appearing on CBS Mornings in its New York studio when she received the invitation via a live video feed from Brooks on the Opry stage in Nashville. |
| 225 | Henry Cho | February 11, 2023 | Marty Stuart | Vince Gill, Don Schlitz, John Conlee, Ben Isaacs and Steve Wariner | Stuart was discussing comedy's role in the Opry's history with Cho and Mule Deer backstage before the January 6, 2023 show on a Facebook Live video when he extended the invitation to them simultaneously. |
| 226 | Gary Mule Deer | March 10, 2023 | Marty Stuart | Vince Gill, Henry Cho, Jeannie Seely, Rudy Gatlin and John Conlee | Stuart was discussing comedy's role in the Opry's history with Cho and Mule Deer backstage before the January 6, 2023 show on a Facebook Live video when he extended the invitation to them simultaneously. |
| 227 | Sara Evans | October 7, 2023 | Bill Anderson, Carly Pearce and Lady A | Crystal Gayle | Anderson invited Evans during her "Still Restless - The 20-Year Celebration" concert and livestream at Ryman Auditorium. Pearce & Lady A joined him on stage for the invitation. |
| 228 | Jon Pardi | October 24, 2023 | Alan Jackson | Garth Brooks | Jackson delivered the invitation on a recorded video displayed during a break in Pardi's performance at the 2023 Stagecoach Festival, with on-stage help from television personality Guy Fieri. |
| 229 | Scotty McCreery | April 20, 2024 | Garth Brooks | Josh Turner and Randy Travis | |
| 230 | T. Graham Brown | May 3, 2024 | Vince Gill | Vince Gill, Jeannie Seely, Mark Wills, the Isaacs, and John Conlee | Gill extended the invitation during a guest appearance on Brown's SiriusXM radio show. |
| 231 | Lainey Wilson | June 7, 2024 | Reba McEntire | Garth Brooks and Trisha Yearwood | McEntire invited Wilson during the Season 25 finale of The Voice. |
| 232 | Steven Curtis Chapman | November 1, 2024 | Ricky Skaggs | Lady A | Chapman is the only contemporary Christian musician to earn Opry membership. |
| 233 | Steve Earle | September 17, 2025 | Vince Gill | Emmylou Harris | |
| 234 | Kathy Mattea | October 11, 2025 | Charlie McCoy | Terri Clark | |
| 235 | Suzy Bogguss | January 16, 2026 | Kathy Mattea, Terri Clark, and Trisha Yearwood | Reba McEntire | Mattea invited Bogguss to join only moments after her own induction. Clark and Yearwood joined her on stage for the invitation. It is the first time in Opry history that an artist has been inducted and another invited during the same show. |
| 236 | Jelly Roll | March 10, 2026 | Craig Morgan | Lainey Wilson | Morgan issued the invitation via recorded message during Jelly Roll's appearance on The Joe Rogan Experience on December 10, 2025. |
| 237 | Rhett Akins | October 13, 2026 | Jon Pardi | Jamey Johnson and Jon Pardi | |
| | Charlie Worsham | TBD | Vince Gill | TBD | Worsham had briefly been a de facto Opry member during his time as a band member of Old Crow Medicine Show in 2019 |
| | Neal McCoy | TBD | Pam Tillis | TBD | McCoy was invited during a tribute show to his late mentor, Charley Pride. Joining Tillis on stage during the invitation were members of Pride's family. |
