= Can I Trust You with My Heart =

"Can I Trust You With My Heart"

Single by Travis Tritt

from the album T-R-O-U-B-L-E
- B-side: "A Hundred Years from Now"
- Released: November 30, 1992
- Genre: Country
- Length: 3:34
- Label: Warner Bros. Nashville
- Songwriters: Travis Tritt, Stewart Harris
- Producer: Gregg Brown

Travis Tritt singles chronology
"Lord Have Mercy on the Working Man" (1992)	"Can I Trust You With My Heart" (1992)	"T-R-O-U-B-L-E" (1993)

"Can I Trust You With My Heart" is a song co-written and recorded by American country music singer Travis Tritt. It was released in November 1992 as the second single released his CD T-R-O-U-B-L-E. The song reached the top of the Billboard Hot Country Singles & Tracks (now Hot Country Songs) chart. The song was written by Tritt and Stewart Harris.

== Content ==
The narrator first explains how special it is in falling in love with a person of the opposite sex, and the difficulties that can occasionally arise with it. He then elaborates on his own relationship with a significant other and goes on to explain that while he has developed a trust in her, he wonders if that trust is good enough to advance in spending the remainder of his life with her, especially if their relationship will ultimately result in marriage.

== Critical reception ==
Geoffrey Himes, of Billboard magazine reviewed the song favorably, calling it "a tear-in-your-beer ballad."

== Music video ==
The music video was directed by Jack Cole, and premiered in late 1992. It is almost entirely in black and white, save for a love scene in a motel room which is in color.

== Personnel ==
Per liner notes

- Sam Bacco - timpani, cymbals, crotales, tambourine
- Mike Brignardello - bass guitar
- Larry Byrom - acoustic guitar
- Terry Crisp - baritone steel guitar
- Jack Holder - electric guitar
- Billy Livsey - Hammond organ, harmonium
- Dana McVicker - backing vocals
- Hargus "Pig" Robbins - piano
- Travis Tritt - vocals
- Steve Turner - drums
- Billy Joe Walker Jr. - acoustic guitar, slide guitar
- Reggie Young - electric guitar

== Chart performance ==
The song debuted at number 62 on the Hot Country Singles & Tracks chart dated December 5, 1992. It spent twenty weeks on that chart and reached Number One on the chart dated February 13, 1993, remaining there for two weeks, marking Tritt's third Number One.

=== Charts ===
Chart (1992–1993)	Peak position
Canada Country Singles (RPM)	1
US Hot Country Songs (Billboard)	1

=== Year-end charts ===
Chart (1993)	Position
Canada Country Tracks (RPM)	13
US Country Songs (Billboard)	33
