= Bringing It Back =

1975 song written by Gregg Gordon

"Bringing It Back"^{[A]} is a song written by Gregg Gordon. The song was first released on the album called Today by Elvis Presley in May of 1975. The first version released as a single was from by Brenda Lee in July 1975, who enjoyed Top 40 US country and Canadian country chart success with it. Presley's version was issued as a single in September 1975 and reached the US Hot 100.

== Brenda Lee version ==
"Bringing It Back"

Single by Brenda Lee
- B-side: "Papa's Knee"
- Released: July 1975
- Recorded: January 1975
- Genre: Country
- Length: 3:07
- Label: MCA
- Songwriter: Greg Gordon
- Producer: Owen Bradley

Brenda Lee singles chronology
"He's My Rock" (1975)	"Bringing It Back" (1975)	"Find Yourself Another Puppet" (1976)

Brenda Lee had been a pop music artist during the 1960s with songs like "Sweet Nothin's" and "I'm Sorry" but was marketed towards the country field in the 1970s. She had a string of US top ten singles during the decade. Among them was two charting singles from 1975, one of them being "Bringing It Back". Lee's version was recorded in January 1975 in a session produced by Owen Bradley. Her version received positive reviews from magazines, with Cash Box calling it "a strong lyric set" while Billboard called it "a lovely ballad". "Bringing It Back" was issued as a single by MCA Records in July 1975, incorrectly spelling the writer's name as "Greg Gordon". It first charted in early August, then reached the Top 40 on the North American country song charts, rising to number 23 on the US Hot Country Songs chart in mid-September, also reaching number 26 on the Canadian Country Tracks chart.

=== Track listing ===
7-inch vinyl single

- "Bringing It Back" – 3:07
- "Papa's Knee" – 3:07

=== Charts ===
Weekly chart performance for "Bringing It Back"
Chart (1975)	Peak position
Canada Country Tracks (RPM)	26
US Hot Country Songs (Billboard)	23

== Elvis Presley version ==
"Bringing It Back"

Single by Elvis Presley

from the album Today
- B-side: "Pieces of My Life"
- Released: September 20, 1975
- Recorded: March 12, 1975
- Studio: RCA Studio C, Hollywood
- Genre: Country
- Label: RCA Victor
- Songwriter: Gregg Gordon
- Producer: Felton Jarvis

Elvis Presley singles chronology
"T-R-O-U-B-L-E" / "Mr. Songman" (1975)	"Bringing It Back" / "Pieces of My Life" (1975)	"For the Heart" / "Hurt" (1976)

Presley recorded his version in March 1975, three months after Brenda Lee recorded hers. His version appeared first on his Today album in May 1975, before her single came out. Just after Lee's version had peaked, Presley released "Bringing It Back" as a single (with "Pieces of My Life" on the B-side) on September 20, 1975. The single reached number 65 on the Billboard Hot 100.

=== Recording and release ===
Elvis recorded the song on March 12, 1975, at RCA's Studio C in Hollywood for his album Today. The session featured James Burton, John Wilkinson and Charlie Hodge on guitar, Duke Bardwell on bass, Ronnie Tutt on drums, Glen D. Hardin and Tony Brown on piano, David Briggs and Greg Gordon on clavinet; the recordings were later overdubbed by Johnny Christopher and Chip Young on guitar, Norbert Putnam and Mike Leech on bass, Richard F. Morris on percussion, Charles L. Rose on saxophone, Harvey L. Thompson on trombone, Harrison Calloway on trumpet, Ronald Eades on junior baritone saxophone and The Holladays on additional vocals.

On September 20, 1975, "with absolutely nothing new to release, and no prospects of another recording session in sight", RCA Victor released "Bringing It Back" and another song from the same album, "Pieces of My Life", as a single. As the Elvis Presley official website states it, "the strategy was not lost on a public that had already bought well-worn material once in numbers that were unlikely to be repeated". "Bringing It Back" reached number 65 on the Billboard Hot 100, and "Pieces of My Life" number 33 on the Billboard country chart.

=== Track listing ===
7-inch single (RCA Victor PB-10401, 1975)
No.	Title	Writer(s)	Length
1.	"Bringing It Back"	Greg Gordon	2:58
2.	"Pieces of My Life"	Troy Seals	3:59

=== Charts ===
Chart (1975)	Peak position
US Billboard Hot 100	65

== Notes ==
1. ^{A} Titled "Bringin' It Back" on the 2005 Follow That Dream re-issue of the album Today
