= Pieces of My Life =

Single by Elvis Presley

from the album Today
- A-side: "Bringing It Back" "Pieces of My Life"
- Released: September 20, 1975
- Recorded: March 12, 1975
- Studio: RCA Studio C, Hollywood
- Genre: Country
- Songwriter: Troy Seals

Elvis Presley singles chronology
"T-R-O-U-B-L-E" / "Mr. Songman" (1975)	"Bringing It Back" / "Pieces of My Life" (1975)	"For the Heart" / "Hurt" (1976)

"Pieces of My Life" is a song written by Troy Seals. It was originally recorded by Charlie Rich and appeared on his 1974 album The Silver Fox.

In 1975, Elvis Presley covered the song for his album Today. Released as a single (with "Bringing It Back" on the opposite side) on September 20, 1975, the song reached number 33 on the Billboard country chart.

== Elvis Presley version ==
=== Recording ===
Presley recorded the song on March 12, 1975, at RCA's Studio C in Hollywood for his album Today. It features James Burton, John Wilkinson and Charlie Hodge on guitar, Duke Bardwell on bass, Ronnie Tutt on drums, Glen D. Hardin and Tony Brown on piano, David Briggs and Greg Gordon on clavinet. The recording was later overdubbed by Johnny Christopher and Chip Young on guitar, Norbert Putnam and Mike Leech on bass, Richard F. Morris on percussion, Charles L. Rose on saxophone, Harvey L. Thompson on trombone, Harrison Calloway on trumpet, Ronald Eades on junior baritone saxophone and The Holladays on additional vocals.

During the session, Brian Wilson of the Beach Boys visited and disrupted the recording. Wilson remembered,

I was recording with Terry Melcher at RCA Victor Records in 1975. We were working on the song "Why Do Fools Fall in Love?" Terry said, "Hey, Elvis is in the next studio recording." That was a big surprise to hear he was in the studio next to me. So I walked into the studio and said, "Hi, I’m Brian Wilson" and he goes, "Hello Duke." I don’t know why he called me Duke." I said, "Would you like to hear what I’m doing in the studio?" and he said yes. So we walked over to my studio and listened to what I was doing and then said he had to leave.

According to Memphis Mafia member Jerry Schilling, Wilson played some of the band's recent recordings for Presley. "After a few tracks, Brian says, 'Well? Do you think they're any good?' Elvis looks up and replies, 'Nah,' before leaving. I don't think he had any idea that the guy was Brian Wilson." Wilson then tried to karate chop the singer.

=== Release ===
On September 20, 1975, "with absolutely nothing new to release, and no prospects of another recording session in sight", RCA Victor released "Pieces of My Life" and another song from the same album, "Bringing It Back", as a single. As the Elvis Presley official website states it, "the strategy was not lost on a public that had already bought well-worn material once in numbers that were unlikely to be repeated". "Brigning It Back" reached number 65 on the Billboard Hot 100, and "Pieces of My Life" number 33 on the Billboard country chart.

=== Track listing ===
7" single (RCA Victor PB-10401, 1975)
No.	Title	Writer(s)	Length
1.	"Bringing It Back"	Greg Gordon	2:58
2.	"Pieces of My Life"	Troy Seals	3:59

=== Charts ===
Chart (1975)	Peak position
US Hot Country Songs (Billboard)	33
