= T-R-O-U-B-L-E (song) =

1975 single by Elvis Presley

Single by Elvis Presley

from the album Today
- B-side: "Mr. Songman"
- Released: April 22, 1975
- Recorded: March 11, 1975
- Studio: Studio C, Hollywood
- Genre: Rock and roll; country rock
- Length: 3:02
- Label: RCA Victor
- Songwriter: Jerry Chesnut
- Producer: Felton Jarvis

Elvis Presley singles chronology
"My Boy" / "Thinking About You" (1975)	"T-R-O-U-B-L-E" (1975)	"Bringing It Back" / "Pieces of My Life" (1975)

"T-R-O-U-B-L-E" is a song written by Jerry Chesnut and recorded by Elvis Presley in March 1975. It was released as a single, as the A-side, with the B-side "Mr. Songman", through RCA Victor that was taken from his album Today. It is not to be confused with the Leiber and Stoller song "Trouble", that Presley first recorded in July 1958, and which was subsequently recorded by numerous other artists.

== Background and writing ==
Jerry Chesnut wrote the song in 1975, taking inspiration from a singer and pianist named Little David Wilkins. He said that, when writing the title, he thought of a woman walking through the door and causing trouble; he added that he spelled out the word "trouble", then the words "alone" and "looking", and found that they rhymed when spelled out.

== Content ==
The male narrator is a musician who performs at various nightclubs as his main source of income, especially during late-night hours. During a performance at one particular club, the narrator notices a rather attractive young female entering the club by herself. The narrator concurrently begins to boast about the female's characteristics and features, and implies a great sense of trouble (hence the song's hook, "I smell T-R-O-U-B-L-E") that the female could cause as a result, such as bringing her attractiveness to the attention of males that notice or approach her, and subsequently inflicting jealousy among other females with characteristics somewhat less appealing than hers.

== Chart performance ==
Chart (1975)	Peak position
US Billboard Hot 100	35
US Hot Country Songs (Billboard)	11
US Easy Listening (Billboard)	42
UK (Official Charts Company)	31

== Personnel ==
Sourced from Keith Flynn and RCA session logs.

- Elvis Presley – lead vocals, harmony vocals
- James Burton – lead guitar
- John Wilkinson – electric rhythm guitar
- Charlie Hodge – acoustic rhythm guitar; backing vocals (uncertain)
- Duke Bardwell – bass guitar
- Glen Hardin – piano
- Ron Tutt – drums
- David Briggs – clavinet
- Voice (Donnie Sumner, Sherrill Nielsen, Tim Baty, Thomas Hensley) – backing vocals

== Travis Tritt version ==
"T-R-O-U-B-L-E"

Single by Travis Tritt

from the album T-R-O-U-B-L-E
- B-side: "T-R-O-U-B-L-E" (remix)
- Released: March 13, 1993
- Recorded: 1992
- Length: 3:00
- Label: Warner Bros. Nashville
- Songwriter: Jerry Chesnut
- Producer: Gregg Brown

Travis Tritt singles chronology
"Can I Trust You With My Heart" (1992)	"T-R-O-U-B-L-E" (1993)	"Looking Out for Number One" (1993)

This song was recorded in 1992 by American country music singer Travis Tritt. It was the third single released from his 1992 album of the same name. It peaked at No. 13 in the United States, and No. 17 in Canada. It was later featured in the 1996 film Tremors 2: Aftershocks.

=== Personnel ===
- Sam Bacco – tambourine, percussion
- Mike Brignardello – bass guitar
- Larry Byrom – acoustic guitar, slide guitar
- John Cowan – backing vocals
- Jack Holder – electric guitar
- John Jorgenson – electric guitar
- Billy Livsey – Hammond organ, clavinet
- Dana McVicker – backing vocals
- Hargus "Pig" Robbins – piano
- Jimmy Joe Ruggiere – harmonica
- Travis Tritt – vocals
- Steve Turner – drums
- Billy Joe Walker Jr. – electric guitar
- Reggie Young – electric guitar

=== Critical reception ===
Geoffrey Himes, of Billboard magazine, reviewed the song favorably, saying that Tritt transforms it with "boogie-woogie piano, slide guitar and super-fast tempo into a bar romp reminiscent of Little Feat."

=== Music video ===
The music video was directed by Jack Cole. It features Tritt singing the song on a stage surrounded by a huge crowd. Later, he jumps into the crowd to look for a certain girl.

=== Charts ===
Chart (1993)	Peak position
Canada Country Singles (RPM)	17
US Bubbling Under Hot 100 (Billboard)	8
US Hot Country Songs (Billboard)	13
