= Gary Mule Deer =

American comedian and country musician (born 1939)

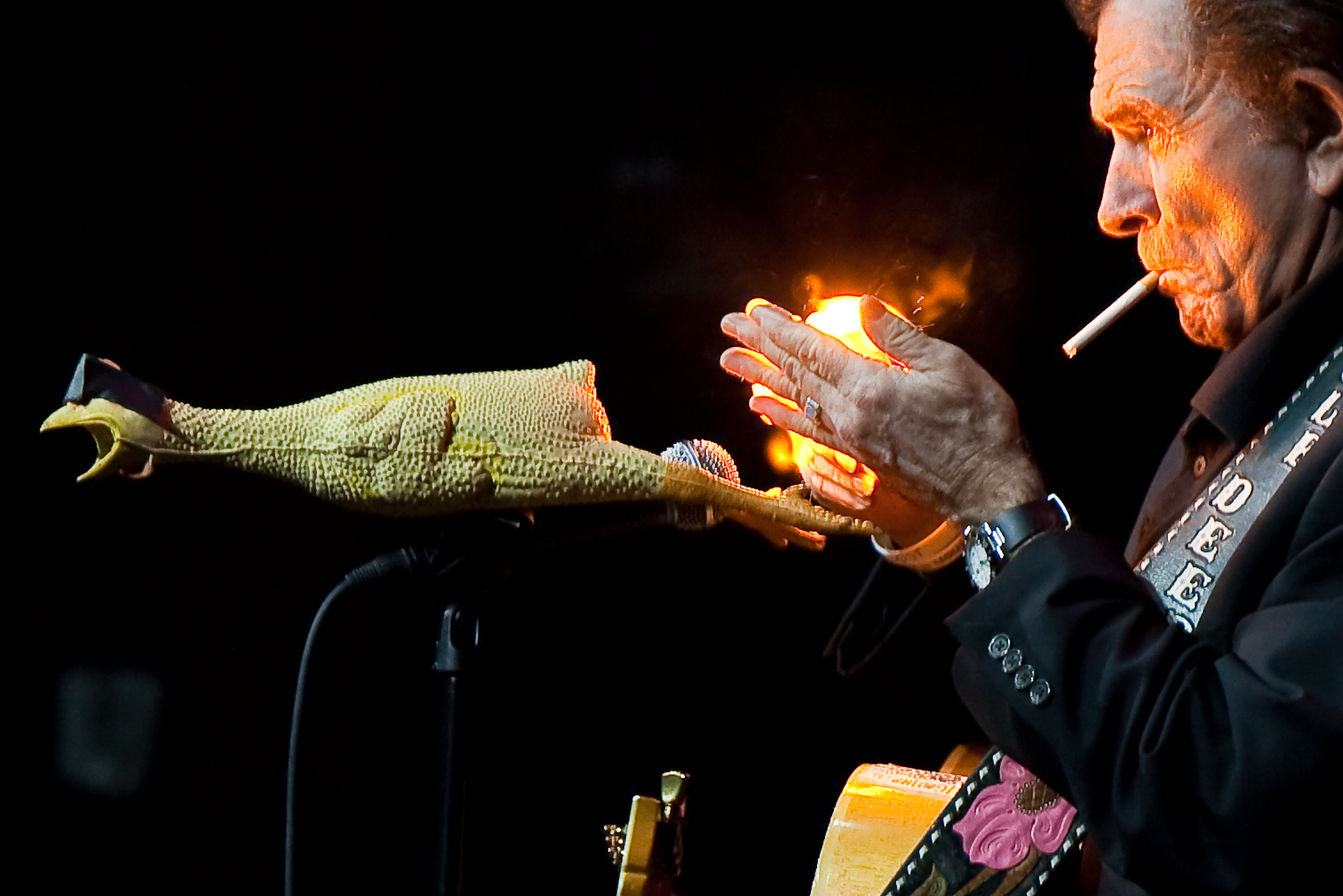
- Mule Deer in 2009
- Born: Gary C. Miller; November 21, 1939 (age 86); Deadwood, South Dakota, U.S.
- Occupations: Actor, comedian, musician
- Website: www.garymuledeer.com

Gary Mule Deer (born Gary C. Miller; November 21, 1939) is an American comedian and country musician.

== Biography ==
During a career spanning six decades, Gary Mule Deer has performed on many major concert stages in the United States, and has made over 350 television appearances, including many on both The Tonight Show starring Johnny Carson and the Late Show with David Letterman, both of whose hosts he had met early in his career at The Comedy Store in Los Angeles. He was one of six comedians, along with Jay Leno, to star on the first HBO comedy special, Freddie Prinze and Friends, was the co-host of Don Kirshner's Rock Concert for four years on NBC, a regular on Make Me Laugh, and a frequent judge on The Gong Show. He has made over 100 appearances on The Nashville Network, including two years as a cast member on Hee Haw. He has appeared in films such as Annie Hall, Up In Smoke and Tilt. He is featured on the DVDs "Jeff Foxworthy's Comedy Classics" and "The World's Greatest Stand-up Comedy Collection" hosted by Norm Crosby. He also has a Gary Mule Deer Live CD of his comedy and music. Gary is one of the most-played comedians on the Clean Comedy Channels of both Sirius and XM Satellite Radio.

After being a member of Epic Records' music group The Back Porch Majority, RCA Victor's The New Society, and Paramount Records' Bandanna in the 1960s, he joined with Denny Flannigan in the early 1970s to form a comedy act called "The Muledeer and Moondog Medicine Show". They became regulars on The John Byner Comedy Hour on CBS, Burns and Schreiber Comedy Hour on ABC, and Madhouse 90 With David Frost on NBC, and were frequent guests on The Midnight Special and In Concert. They also traveled for six years, performing at comedy clubs, the Playboy Clubs and the college circuit. They opened for many Rock bands, including the Doobie Brothers, Sly and the Family Stone, The Guess Who, and Boz Scaggs.

Gary Mule Deer entertains regularly at casinos in Las Vegas, Lake Tahoe, Atlantic City and Reno. On January 10, 2009, he appeared at Carnegie Hall. For 31 years, he toured as a special guest with Johnny Mathis on select dates, performing a stand-up routine in between sets. He performed at Mathis' last concert before his retirement from touring at Bergen Performing Arts Center. He performs often on the Grand Ole Opry stage, and was invited to become a member of the Opry on January 6, 2023.

Mule Deer was once roommates with comedian Steve Martin and musician Michael Johnson. Mule Deer supplied the first joke Martin submitted to Tommy Smothers on The Smothers Brothers Comedy Hour.
