= Wobble board =

Musical instrument invented by Rolf Harris

The wobble board is a musical instrument invented and popularised by Australian musician and artist Rolf Harris, and is featured in his best-known song "Tie Me Kangaroo Down, Sport". A wobble board, like some other musical instruments, can be ornately decorated because its large surface area can act as a canvas without detracting from its musical capability.

The instrument is played by holding the board lengthwise with the hands holding the edges and flicking the board outward, thereby making a characteristic "whoop-whoop" noise. The angle at which the board is held, and the way the board is "flicked", can alter the timbre of the sound produced. It is similar to the thunder sheet, a metal instrument used to imitate the sound of thunder in 18th century theatre.

== History ==
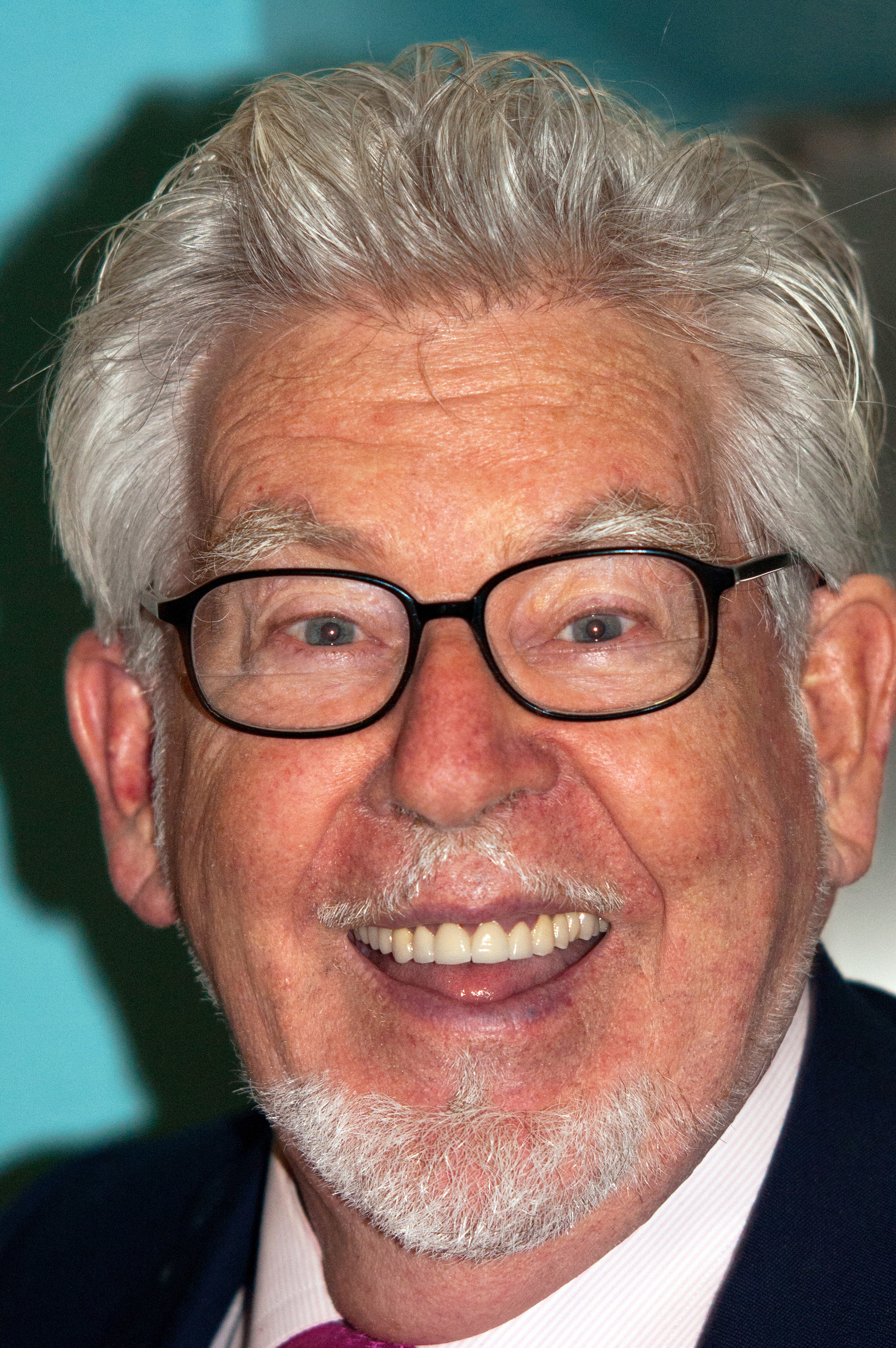
The wobble board was invented and popularised by Rolf Harris

According to an interview he gave to Tony Barrell for The Sunday Times Magazine in 2001, Harris discovered the musical properties of hardboard by chance in 1959, when he was about to paint a portrait of the conjurer Robert Harbin. Before his subject arrived, Harris prepared the background, covering a large piece of hardboard with Prussian blue oil paint mixed with turpentine. But the surface refused to dry. "It was all sticky and nasty. He was due to arrive in about half an hour." In desperation, Harris propped the board over a paraffin heater. When he touched it later, it was so hot it burned his finger. "So I propped it between the palms of my hands and shook it to cool it down. And ... I thought, 'What a marvellous sound.'"

Rolf Harris said:

My first Wobble Board was made of 2-foot-by-3-foot 1/10-inch-thick hardboard, although they can be made slightly smaller. There is a slight indentation in the middle of each of the short side so the hands don't slip when playing. This needs to be as wide as the hand and about quarter inch deep. It is played, not by gripping the board with the fingers, but by propping it between the palms of the hands and bouncing it, accenting every second rhythm, don't try to play every one. I've found tempered hardboard works best, or MDF board but it must be really thin, or it's too hard to bounce! Good Luck!

Official Rolf Harris wobble boards were sold commercially for a time in the 1970s but most were made by the player. Almost any large, springy and flexible sheet of material can be used as an impromptu wobble board, although some materials are markedly better than others. Harris's instrument was originally made from a type of wood composite known as hardboard (Masonite in the United States and Australia).

Two wobble boards donated by Harris were part of the National Museum of Australia collection before they were removed in the light of his arrest for indecent assault in 2013.
