= Travis Tritt discography =

- Studio albums: 14
- Live albums: 4
- Compilation albums: 6
- Singles: 43
- Music videos: 42

Travis Tritt is an American country music artist. His discography comprises 14 studio albums (counting a Christmas album), six compilation albums, and 43 singles. Of his studio albums, the highest-certified is 1991's It's All About to Change, at 3× Platinum certification by the RIAA and platinum certification by the CRIA. His first, third, and fourth albums—Country Club, T-R-O-U-B-L-E and Ten Feet Tall and Bulletproof, respectively—are all certified double platinum in the US, while 1996's The Restless Kind, 2000's Down the Road I Go and his 1995 Greatest Hits: From the Beginning album are all certified platinum. It's All About to Change is also his highest-peaking album on Billboard Top Country Albums, at #2.

Of Tritt's forty-three singles, all but two charted on Billboard Hot Country Songs. This total includes five Number Ones on that chart: "Help Me Hold On" (1990), "Anymore" (1991), "Can I Trust You with My Heart" (1993), "Foolish Pride" (1994), and "Best of Intentions" (2000). "Best of Intentions" is also his highest peak on the Billboard Hot 100 at #27, while its follow-ups ("It's a Great Day to Be Alive" and "Love of a Woman", both of which went to #2 on the country chart) reached #33 and #39 on the Hot 100. He has also charted three album cuts that entered the lower regions of the country chart based on unsolicited airplay.

Tritt has also been featured as a guest on eight singles, including two releases by his friend Marty Stuart: "This One's Gonna Hurt You (For a Long, Long Time)" and "Honky Tonkin's What I Do Best", from 1992 and 1996. He has also sung guest vocals on singles for Patty Loveless, Charlie Daniels, Mark O'Connor, and comedian Bill Engvall.

== Studio albums ==
=== 1980s and 1990s ===
Title	Album details	Peak chart positions				Certifications (sales threshold)
Title	Album details	US Country	US	CAN Country	CAN	Certifications (sales threshold)
Proud of the Country	Release date: May 21, 1987; Label: Copperhill Records; Formats: LP, cassette	—	—	—	—	
Country Club	Release date: February 22, 1990; Label: Warner Bros. Nashville; Formats: LP, CD, cassette	3	70	—	—	CAN: Gold; US: 2× Platinum
It's All About to Change	Release date: May 28, 1991; Label: Warner Bros. Nashville; Formats: CD, cassette	2	22	3	—	CAN: Platinum; US: 3× Platinum
T-R-O-U-B-L-E	Release date: August 18, 1992; Label: Warner Bros. Nashville; Formats: CD, cassette	6	27	3	39	CAN: Gold; US: 2× Platinum
A Travis Tritt Christmas: Loving Time of the Year	Release date: September 29, 1992; Label: Warner Bros. Nashville; Formats: CD, cassette	23	75	—	—	
Ten Feet Tall and Bulletproof	Release date: May 10, 1994; Label: Warner Bros. Nashville; Formats: CD, cassette	3	20	3	64	CAN: Platinum; US: 2× Platinum
The Restless Kind	Release date: August 27, 1996; Label: Warner Bros. Nashville; Formats: CD, cassette	7	53	8	—	US: Platinum
No More Looking Over My Shoulder	Release date: October 13, 1998; Label: Warner Bros. Nashville; Formats: CD, cassette	15	119	—	—	
"—" denotes releases that did not chart

=== 2000s ===
Title	Album details	Peak chart positions			Certifications (sales threshold)
Title	Album details	US Country	US	US Indie	Certifications (sales threshold)
Down the Road I Go (Note: Down the Road I Go also peaked at number 18 on the Canadian RPM Country Albums chart.)	Release date: October 3, 2000; Label: Columbia Nashville; Formats: CD, cassette	8	51	—	US: Platinum
Strong Enough	Release date: September 24, 2002; Label: Columbia Nashville; Formats: CD	4	27	—	
My Honky Tonk History	Release date: August 17, 2004; Label: Columbia Nashville; Formats: CD, music download	7	50	—	
The Storm	Release date: August 21, 2007; Label: Category 5 Records; Formats: CD, music download	3	28	3	
Set in Stone	Release date: May 7, 2021; Label: Big Noise Music Group; Formats: CD, music download, streaming	49	—	—	
Country Chapel	Release date: September 15, 2023; Label: Gaither Music Group; Formats: LP, CD, music download	—	—	—	
"—" denotes releases that did not chart

== Live albums ==
Title	Album details
A Man and His Guitar: Live From the Franklin Theatre	Release date: November 18, 2016; Label: Post Oak Records; Formats: CD, music download
The Big Bang Concert Series: Travis Tritt	Release date: February 6, 2017; Label: Mountain Man Music; Formats: CD, music download
Live On Soundstage	Release date: January 18, 2019; Label: BMG Rights Management; Formats: CD, music download
Homegrown	Release date: May 31, 2019; Label: Post Oak Records; Formats: CD, music download

== Compilation albums ==
Title	Album details	Peak chart positions			Certifications (sales threshold)
Title	Album details	US Country	US	US Indie	Certifications (sales threshold)
Greatest Hits: From the Beginning (Note: Greatest Hits: From the Beginning also peaked at number 17 on the Canadian RPM Country Albums chart.)	Release date: September 12, 1995; Label: Warner Bros. Nashville; Formats: CD, cassette	3	21	—	CAN: Gold; US: Platinum
Super Hits	Release date: February 20, 2000; Label: Warner Bros. Nashville; Formats: CD, cassette	50	—	—	
The Rockin' Side	Release date: February 5, 2002; Label: Warner Bros. Nashville; Formats: CD, cassette	66	—	—	
The Lovin' Side	Release date: February 5, 2002; Label: Warner Bros. Nashville; Formats: CD, cassette	48	—	—	
Essentials	Release date: April 22, 2003; Label: Rhino Records; Formats: CD	—	—	—	
The Very Best of Travis Tritt	Release date: January 30, 2007; Label: Rhino Records; Formats: CD, music download	21	124	—	
The Calm After... (Note: The Calm After... is a reissue of The Storm with bonus tracks.)	Release date: July 9, 2013; Label: Post Oak Records; Formats: CD, music download	31	190	39	
"—" denotes releases that did not chart

== Singles ==
=== 1980s and 1990s ===
Year	Single	Peak chart positions				Album
Year	Single	US Country	US	CAN Country	CAN AC	Album
1989	"Country Club"	9	—	22	—	Country Club
1990	"Help Me Hold On"	1	—	1	—	Country Club
1990	"I'm Gonna Be Somebody"	2	—	1	—	Country Club
1990	"Put Some Drive in Your Country"	28	—	23	—	Country Club
1991	"Drift Off to Dream"	3	—	1	—	Country Club
1991	"Here's a Quarter (Call Someone Who Cares)"	2	—	2	—	It's All About to Change
1991	"Anymore"	1	—	1	—	It's All About to Change
1991	"The Whiskey Ain't Workin'" (with Marty Stuart)	2	—	4	—	It's All About to Change
1992	"Nothing Short of Dying"	4	—	7	—	It's All About to Change
1992	"Lord Have Mercy on the Working Man"	5	—	10	—	T-R-O-U-B-L-E
1992	"Can I Trust You with My Heart"	1	—	1	—	T-R-O-U-B-L-E
1993	"T-R-O-U-B-L-E"	13	— (Note: "T-R-O-U-B-L-E" did not enter the Billboard Hot 100, but peaked at number 8 on Bubbling Under Hot 100 Singles, which acts as a 25-song extension of the Hot 100.)	17	—	T-R-O-U-B-L-E
1993	"Looking Out for Number One"	11	—	4	—	T-R-O-U-B-L-E
1993	"Worth Every Mile"	30	—	52	—	T-R-O-U-B-L-E
1994	"Take It Easy"	21	—	12	—	Common Thread: The Songs of the Eagles
1994	"Foolish Pride"	1	— (Note: "Foolish Pride" did not enter the Billboard Hot 100, but peaked at number 12 on Bubbling Under Hot 100 Singles, which acts as a 25-song extension of the Hot 100.)	1	35	Ten Feet Tall and Bulletproof
1994	"Ten Feet Tall and Bulletproof"	22	—	17	—	Ten Feet Tall and Bulletproof
1994	"Between an Old Memory and Me"	11	—	3	—	Ten Feet Tall and Bulletproof
1995	"Tell Me I Was Dreaming"	2	—	3	—	Ten Feet Tall and Bulletproof
1995	"Sometimes She Forgets"	7	—	6	—	Greatest Hits: From the Beginning
1996	"Only You (And You Alone)"	51	—	28	—	Greatest Hits: From the Beginning
1996	"More Than You'll Ever Know"	3	— (Note: "More Than You'll Ever Know" did not enter the Billboard Hot 100, but peaked at number 10 on Bubbling Under Hot 100 Singles, which acts as a 25-song extension of the Hot 100.)	7	—	The Restless Kind
1996	"Where Corn Don't Grow"	6	—	8	—	The Restless Kind
1997	"She's Going Home with Me"	24	—	17	—	The Restless Kind
1997	"Helping Me Get Over You" (with Lari White)	18	—	21	—	The Restless Kind
1998	"Still in Love with You"	23	—	13	—	The Restless Kind
1998	"If I Lost You"	29	86	26	—	No More Looking Over My Shoulder
1999	"No More Looking Over My Shoulder"	38	—	32	—	No More Looking Over My Shoulder
1999	"Start the Car"	52	—	90	—	No More Looking Over My Shoulder
1999	"Move It On Over" (with George Thorogood)	66	—	—	—	King of the Hill: Music from and Inspired by the Television Series
"—" denotes releases that did not chart

=== 2000s-2020s ===
Year	Single	Peak chart positions		Album
Year	Single	US Country	US	Album
2000	"Best of Intentions"	1	27	Down the Road I Go
2000	"It's a Great Day to Be Alive"	2	33	Down the Road I Go
2001	"Love of a Woman"	2	39	Down the Road I Go
2002	"Modern Day Bonnie and Clyde"	8	55	Down the Road I Go
2002	"Strong Enough to Be Your Man"	13	— (Note: "Strong Enough to Be Your Man" did not enter the Billboard Hot 100, but peaked at number 2 on Bubbling Under Hot 100 Singles, which acts as a 25-song extension of the Hot 100.)	Strong Enough
2003	"Country Ain't Country"	26	—	Strong Enough
2003	"Lonesome, On'ry and Mean"	50	—	I've Always Been Crazy: A Tribute to Waylon Jennings
2004	"The Girl's Gone Wild"	28	—	My Honky Tonk History
2004	"What Say You" (with John Mellencamp)	21	— (Note: "What Say You" did not enter the Billboard Hot 100, but peaked at number 17 on Bubbling Under Hot 100 Singles, which acts as a 25-song extension of the Hot 100.)	My Honky Tonk History
2005	"I See Me"	32	—	My Honky Tonk History
2007	"You Never Take Me Dancing"	27	—	The Storm
2007	"Something Stronger Than Me"	—	—	The Storm
2013	"Sometimes Love Just Ain't Enough" (with Tyler Reese)	—	—	The Calm After...
2020	"Ghost Town Nation"	—	—	Set in Stone
2021	"Smoke in a Bar"	—	—	Set in Stone
2021	"They Don’t Make ‘Em Like That No More"	—	—	Set in Stone
"—" denotes releases that did not chart

=== As a featured artist ===
Year	Single	Artist(s)	Peak chart positions						Album
Year	Single	Artist(s)	US Country	US Country Airplay	US	US Main Rock	US Rock	CAN Country	Album
1992	"This One's Gonna Hurt You (For a Long, Long Time)"	Marty Stuart	7		—	—	—	6	This One's Gonna Hurt You
1994	"The Devil Comes Back to Georgia"	Mark O'Connor (with Charlie Daniels, Johnny Cash, and Marty Stuart)	54		—	—	—	—	Heroes
1996	"Honky Tonkin's What I Do Best"	Marty Stuart	23		—	—	—	8	Honky Tonkin's What I Do Best
1996	"Hope"	Hope: Country Music's Quest for a Cure	57		—	—	—	—	—N/a
1997	"Here's Your Sign (Get the Picture)"	Bill Engvall	29		43	—	—	72	—N/a
1998	"I Know About Me, I Don't Know About You"	Waylon Jennings	—	—	—	—	—	—	Closing in on the Fire
1998	"Same Old Train"	Various	59		—	—	—	—	Tribute to Tradition
2002	"Out of Control Raging Fire"	Patty Loveless	—		—	—	—	—	Mountain Soul
2003	"Southern Boy"	The Charlie Daniels Band	51		—	—	—	—	Redneck Fiddlin' Man
2019	"Outlaws & Outsiders"	Cory Marks	— (Note: "Outlaws & Outsiders" did not enter the Hot Country Songs chart, but peaked at number 7 on the Country Digital Song Sales chart.)	—	—	10	14	—	Who I Am
2020	"Pick Her Up"	Hot Country Knights	—	41	—	—	—	42	The K Is Silent
2024	"(Make My) Country Rock"	Cory Marks	—	—	—	19	—	—	Sorry for Nothing
"—" denotes releases that did not chart

== Charted B-sides ==
Year	Single	Peak positions	Original A-side
Year	Single	US Country	Original A-side
1992	"Bible Belt" (with Little Feat)	72	"Nothing Short of Dying"

== Music videos ==
Year	Video	Director
1989	"Country Club"	Jim May
1990	"Help Me Hold On"	Greg Crutcher
1990	"Put Some Drive in Your Country"	Tim Newman
1991	"Drift Off to Dream"	Sherman Halsey
1991	"Here's a Quarter (Call Someone Who Cares)"	Gerry Wenner
1991	"Anymore"	Jack Cole
1991	"The Whiskey Ain't Workin'" (with Marty Stuart)	Gerry Wenner
1992	"Bible Belt"	Marius Penczner
1992	"I Don't Need Your Rockin' Chair" (George Jones & Friends)	Marc Ball
1992	"This One's Gonna Hurt You (For a Long, Long Time)" (with Marty Stuart)	John Lloyd Miller
1992	"Lord Have Mercy on the Working Man"	Jack Cole
1993	"Can I Trust You with My Heart"	Jack Cole
1993	"T-R-O-U-B-L-E"	Jack Cole
1993	"Worth Every Mile"	Gerry Wenner
1993	"The Devil Comes Back to Georgia" (with Mark O'Connor, Charlie Daniels, Marty Stuart & Johnny Cash)	Gustavo Garzon
1994	"Take It Easy"	Gerry Wenner
1994	"Foolish Pride"	Gustavo Garzon
1994	"Ten Feet Tall and Bulletproof"	Jon Small
1995	"Tell Me I Was Dreaming"	Michael Merriman
1995	"Sometimes She Forgets"	Michael Merriman
1996	"Only You (And You Alone)"	Jonathan Lynn
1996	"Honky Tonkin's What I Do Best" (with Marty Stuart)	Michael Merriman
1996	"More Than You'll Ever Know"	John Lloyd Miller
1997	"Here's Your Sign (Get the Picture)" (with Bill Engvall)	Jim Yukich
1997	"Where Corn Don't Grow"	Michael Merriman
1997	"She's Going Home with Me"	Michael Merriman
1997	"Helping Me Get Over You" (with Lari White)	Michael Merriman
1998	"If I Lost You"	Michael Merriman
1999	"No More Looking Over My Shoulder"	Joe DeMaio
1999	"Move It on Over" (with George Thorogood)	Jim Shea
2000	"Best of Intentions"	Michael Merriman
2001	"It's a Great Day to Be Alive"	Jon Small
2001	"Love of a Woman"	Michael Merriman
2002	"Modern Day Bonnie and Clyde"	Michael Merriman
2002	"Out of Control Raging Fire" (with Patty Loveless)	Brent Hedgecock
2002	"Strong Enough to Be Your Man"	Lawrence Carroll
2002	"Southern Boy" (with The Charlie Daniels Band)	Peter Zavadil
2003	"Lonesome, On'ry and Mean"	Deaton Flanigen
2004	"The Girl's Gone Wild"	Michael Salomon
2004	"What Say You" (with John Mellencamp)	Chris Lenz
2007	"You Never Take Me Dancing"	Flick Wiltshire
2013	"Sometimes Love Just Ain't Enough" (with Tyler Reese)	Troy Bieser
2021	"Smoke In A Bar"	David Abbott
2022	"Things You Can't Live Without (with Chris Janson)"	David Bradley
