= Greatest Hits: From the Beginning (Travis Tritt album) =

Greatest hits album by Travis Tritt
- Released: September 12, 1995
- Recorded: 1989–1995
- Genre: Country
- Length: 59:58
- Label: Warner Bros. Nashville
- Producer: Travis Tritt and Gregg Brown (newly recorded tracks); Gregg Brown (all other tracks)

Travis Tritt chronology
Ten Feet Tall and Bulletproof (1994)	Greatest Hits: From the Beginning (1995)	The Restless Kind (1996)

Singles from Greatest Hits: From the Beginning
- 1. "Sometimes She Forgets" Released: August 7, 1995

Professional ratings
Review scores
Source	Rating
Allmusic	link
Entertainment Weekly	A− link

Greatest Hits: From the Beginning is the first compilation album by American country music singer Travis Tritt. Released in 1995 on Warner Bros. Records, the album features thirteen tracks from Tritt's first four studio albums Country Club (1990), It's All About to Change (1991), T-R-O-U-B-L-E (1992), and Ten Feet Tall and Bulletproof (1994). Two songs were newly recorded for this album as well: the Steve Earle-penned "Sometimes She Forgets", and a rendition of the pop standard "Only You (And You Alone)". The former was released as a single in 1995, reaching #7 on the Hot Country Songs charts, while the latter reached #51 on the same chart. Overall, the album was certified platinum by the RIAA for sales of one million copies.

== Track listing ==
All tracks are written by Travis Tritt, unless otherwise noted.

No.	Title	Writer(s)	Original album	Length
1.	"Here's a Quarter (Call Someone Who Cares)"		It's All About to Change (1991)	2:32
2.	"Anymore"	Travis Tritt, Jill Colucci	It's All About to Change	3:47
3.	"Put Some Drive in Your Country"		Country Club (1990)	4:19
4.	"Foolish Pride"		Ten Feet Tall and Bulletproof (1994)	4:18
5.	"The Whiskey Ain't Workin'" (duet with Marty Stuart)	Marty Stuart, Ronny Scaife	It's All About to Change	2:40
6.	"Help Me Hold On"	Tritt, Pat Terry	Country Club	4:01
7.	"I'm Gonna Be Somebody"	Colucci, Stewart Harris	Country Club	4:04
8.	"Only You (And You Alone)"	Buck Ram, Ande Rand	New song	3:51
9.	"T-R-O-U-B-L-E"	Jerry Chesnut	T-R-O-U-B-L-E (1992)	3:00
10.	"Tell Me I Was Dreaming" (single version)	Tritt, Bruce Ray Brown	Ten Feet Tall and Bulletproof	4:54
11.	"Country Club"	Dennis Lord, Catesby Jones	Country Club	3:10
12.	"Can I Trust You with My Heart"	Tritt, Harris	T-R-O-U-B-L-E	6:00
13.	"Sometimes She Forgets"	Steve Earle	New song	4:36
14.	"Ten Feet Tall and Bulletproof"		Ten Feet Tall and Bulletproof	3:31
15.	"Drift Off to Dream"	Tritt, Harris	Country Club	5:15
Total length:				59:58

== Personnel ==
- Sam Bacco - percussion, timpani
- Richard Bennett - electric guitar
- Mike Briganrdello - bass guitar
- Pat Buchanan - electric guitar, slide guitar
- Larry Byrom - acoustic guitar, slide guitar
- John Cowan - background vocals
- Wendell Cox - electric guitar
- Terry Crisp - steel guitar
- Jerry Douglas - dobro
- Stuart Duncan - fiddle
- Paul Franklin - steel guitar
- Jack Holder - electric guitar
- John Jorgenson - electric guitar
- Bernie Leadon - electric guitar
- Billy Livsey - harmonium, Hammond organ
- Dennis Locorriere - background vocals
- Phil Madeira - Hammond organ
- Mac McAnally - acoustic guitar
- Dana McVicker - background vocals
- Edgar Meyer - arco bass
- Mark O'Connor - fiddle
- Bobby Ogdin - harpsichord, piano
- Hargus "Pig" Robbins - piano
- Mike Rojas - piano
- Matt Rollings - piano
- Jimmy Joe Ruggiere - harmonica
- Russell Smith - background vocals
- Marty Stuart - electric guitar and vocals on "The Whiskey Ain't Workin'"
- Travis Tritt - lead vocals
- Steve Turner - drums
- Billy Joe Walker Jr. - electric guitar
- Kent Wells - electric guitar
- Reggie Young - electric guitar

== Charts ==
=== Weekly charts ===
Chart (1995)	Peak position
Canadian Country Albums (RPM)	17
US Billboard 200	21
US Top Country Albums (Billboard)	3

=== Year-end charts ===
Chart (1995)	Position
US Top Country Albums (Billboard)	46
Chart (1996)	Position
US Billboard 200	162
US Top Country Albums (Billboard)	19
Chart (1997)	Position
US Top Country Albums (Billboard)	59

== Certifications ==
Region	Certification	Certified units/sales
Canada (Music Canada)	Gold	50,000^{^}
United States (RIAA)	Platinum	1,000,000^{^}
^{^} Shipments figures based on certification alone.
