= The Very Best of Travis Tritt =

Greatest hits album by Travis Tritt
- Released: January 30, 2007
- Genre: Country
- Length: 1:17:28
- Label: Rhino
- Producer: Various

Travis Tritt chronology
| My Honky Tonk History (2004) | The Very Best of Travis Tritt (2007) | The Storm (2007) |

The Very Best of Travis Tritt is the title of a compilation album released in 2007 by American country music singer Travis Tritt. It features 19 hits from his first several studio albums, as well as his rendition of the Eagles hit "Take It Easy", which he recorded in 1993 for Common Thread: The Songs of the Eagles. The album itself reached #21 on the Billboard Top Country Albums charts.

== Track listing ==
| No. | Title | Writer(s) | Length |
|---|---|---|---|
| 1. | "It's a Great Day to Be Alive" | Darrell Scott | 4:02 |
| 2. | "Take It Easy" | Jackson Browne, Glenn Frey | 3:32 |
| 3. | "Here's a Quarter (Call Someone Who Cares)" | Travis Tritt | 2:33 |
| 4. | "Anymore" | Tritt, Jill Colucci | 3:47 |
| 5. | "Country Club" | Dennis Lord, Catesby Jones | 3:12 |
| 6. | "Help Me Hold On" | Tritt, Pat Terry | 4:02 |
| 7. | "Where Corn Don't Grow" | Roger Murrah, Mark Alan Springer | 3:32 |
| 8. | "Best of Intentions" | Tritt | 4:19 |
| 9. | "I'm Gonna Be Somebody" | Colucci, Stewart Harris | 4:06 |
| 10. | "Can I Trust You With My Heart" | Harris, Tritt | 3:34 |
| 11. | "Foolish Pride" | Tritt | 4:21 |
| 12. | "Lord Have Mercy on the Working Man" | Kostas | 4:56 |
| 13. | "Nothing Short of Dying" | Tritt | 3:52 |
| 14. | "More Than You'll Ever Know" | Tritt | 3:29 |
| 15. | "Sometimes She Forgets" (single edit) | Steve Earle | 3:48 |
| 16. | "This One's Gonna Hurt You (For a Long, Long Time)" (duet with Marty Stuart) | Marty Stuart | 3:30 |
| 17. | "Tell Me I Was Dreaming" (single edit) | Tritt, Bruce Ray Brown | 3:46 |
| 18. | "Drift Off to Dream" (single version) | Tritt, Harris | 3:44 |
| 19. | "The Whiskey Ain't Workin'" (duet with Marty Stuart) | Stuart, Ronny Scaife | 2:41 |
| 20. | "T-R-O-U-B-L-E" | Jerry Chesnut | 3:01 |

== Critical reception ==
Professional ratings
Review scores
| Source | Rating |
|---|---|
| About.com | 5/5 stars |
| Allmusic | 4.5/5 stars |
| Country Weekly | (favorable) |

The Very Best of Travis Tritt received four-and-a-half stars from Jason Birchmeier of Allmusic. Birchmeier's review states that "it's difficult to envision a better-compiled Warner Brothers-era single-disc collection of Tritt's music." Jolene Downs of About.com gave the album five stars and says that the album "showcases Tritt's incredible talents not only as a songwriter but as a very versatile vocalist."

== Chart performance ==
The Very Best of Travis Tritt peaked at number 21 on the U.S. Billboard Top Country Albums chart and number 124 on the Billboard 200. As of April 2015, The Very Best of Travis Tritt has sold 506,100 copies in the United States.

| Chart (2007) | Peak position |
|---|---|
| U.S. Billboard 200 | 124 |
| U.S. Billboard Top Country Albums | 21 |
