= 31st Academy of Country Music Awards =

US music awards ceremony in 1996

- Date: April 24, 1996
- Location: Universal Amphitheatre, Los Angeles, California
- Hosted by: Brooks & Dunn; Faith Hill

Highlights
- Most wins: Brooks & Dunn; Shania Twain (2 each)
- Most nominations: Brooks & Dunn; Tim McGraw (5 each)

Television/radio coverage
- Network: NBC

The 31st Academy of Country Music Awards was held on April 24, 1996, at the Universal Amphitheatre, in Los Angeles, California . The ceremony was hosted by Faith Hill and Brooks & Dunn.

== Winners and nominees ==
Winners are shown in bold.

Entertainer of the Year	Album of the Year
**Brooks & Dunn**; Garth Brooks; Alan Jackson; Reba McEntire; Tim McGraw	**The Woman in Me — Shania Twain**; All I Want — Tim McGraw; Lead On — George Strait; Waitin' on Sundown — Brooks & Dunn; When Fallen Angels Fly — Patty Loveless
Top Female Vocalist of the Year	Top Male Vocalist of the Year
**Patty Loveless**; Faith Hill; Reba McEntire; Pam Tillis; Shania Twain	**Alan Jackson**; John Berry; Vince Gill; Tim McGraw; George Strait
Top Vocal Group of the Year	Top Vocal Duo of the Year
**The Mavericks**; Alabama; BlackHawk; Diamond Rio; Sawyer Brown	**Brooks & Dunn**; Baker & Myers; George Jones and Tammy Wynette; Shelby Lynne and Faith Hill; Dolly Parton and Vince Gill
Single Record of the Year	Song of the Year
**"Check Yes or No"** — **George Strait**; "Any Man of Mine" — Shania Twain; "I Like It, I Love It" — Tim McGraw; "It Matters to Me" — Faith Hill; "You're Gonna Miss Me When I'm Gone" — Brooks & Dunn	**"The Keeper of the Stars"** — **Dickey Lee, Karen Staley, Danny Mayo**; "I Like It, I Love It" — Jeb Stuart Anderson, Mark Hall, Steve Dukes; "Standing on the Edge of Goodbye" — John Berry, Stewart Harris; "You Don't Even Know Who I Am" — Gretchen Peters; "You're Gonna Miss Me When I'm Gone" — Don Cook, Kix Brooks, Ronnie Dunn
Top New Male Vocalist	Top New Female Vocalist
**Bryan White**; Wade Hayes; David Lee Murphy	**Shania Twain**; Terri Clark; Alison Krauss
Top New Vocal Duo or Group	Video of the Year
**Lonestar**; 4 Runner; Perfect Stranger	**"The Car"** — **Jeff Carson**; "My Wife Thinks You're Dead" — Junior Brown; "Not That Different" — Collin Raye; "Sold (The Grundy County Auction Incident)" — John Michael Montgomery; "Tell Me I Was Dreaming" — Travis Tritt
Pioneer Award
**Merle Haggard**
Special Achievement Award
**Jeff Foxworthy**

== Performers ==
Performer(s)	Song(s)
Joe Diffie; Aaron Tippin; John Anderson; Lee Roy Parnell	"C-O-U-N-T-R-Y"
Martina McBride	"Phones Are Ringin' All Over Town"
Terri Clark; Shania Twain	Top New Female Vocalist Medley "If I Were You" "Home Ain't Where His Heart Is (Anymore)"
Alabama	"Say I"
Garth Brooks	Tony Arata Medley "The Dance" "Face to Face" "The Change"
Tim McGraw	"All I Want Is a Life"
Lonestar; Perfect Stranger; 4 Runner	Top New Vocal Duo or Group Medley "No News" "You Have the Right to Remain Silent" "Cain's Blood"
Shania Twain	"No One Needs to Know"
Brooks & Dunn	"My Maria"
Reba McEntire	"Starting Over Again"
Clint Black	"A Bad Goodbye"
David Lee Murphy; Bryan White; Wade Hayes	Top New Male Vocalist Medley "Every Time I Get Around You" "I'm Not Supposed to Love You Anymore" "Old Enough to Know Better"
Alan Jackson	"Home"
Faith Hill	"It Matters to Me"
Marty Stuart; Travis Tritt	"Honky Tonkin's What I Do Best"
Collin Raye	"Not That Different"
Tracy Lawrence	"Time Marches On"
Collin Raye; Chely Wright; Tim McGraw; Trisha Yearwood; Michelle Wright; Marty Stuart; Little Texas; Tracy Lawrence; Terri Clark; Neal McCoy; Travis Tritt; John Berry; Steve Wariner; Rhett Akins; Jo Dee Messina	"Hope"

== Presenters ==
Presenter(s)	Notes
Billy Dean; Loni Anderson; Steve Wariner	Top Vocal Group of the Year
Tracy Byrd; Chely Wright; Clay Walker	Top New Female Vocalist
Brooks & Dunn; Faith Hill	Presented Special Achievement Award to Jeff Foxworthy
Mark Chesnutt; Crystal Bernard; Doug Supernaw	Video of the Year
Neal McCoy; Linda Davis; Emilio Navaira	Top New Vocal Duo or Group
Trisha Yearwood; The Mavericks	Song of the Year
Sawyer Brown; Pam Tillis	Album of the Year
Diamond Rio; Naomi Judd	Top Vocal Duo of the Year
Shelby Lynne; Little Texas	Top New Male Vocalist
Clint Black	Presented Cliffie Stone Pioneer Award to Merle Haggard
BlackHawk; Patty Loveless	Single Record of the Year
John Berry; Leeza Gibbons; Shawntel Smith	Top Female Vocalist of the Year
Michelle Wright; Janine Turner	Top Male Vocalist of the Year
Jay Leno	Entertainer of the Year
