= Ten Feet Tall (disambiguation) =

"Ten Feet Tall" is a 2014 song by Afrojack featuring Wrabel. Ten Feet Tall may also refer to:

== Music ==
- Ten Feet Tall and Bulletproof, American country artist Travis Tritt's fourth album

=== Songs ===
- "Ten Feet Tall", 1970 single by Joe Gibbs (record producer)
- "Ten Feet Tall", 1979 song by XTC from the album Drums and Wires
- "Ten Feet Tall", 1990 song by Mark Lanegan from the album The Winding Sheet
- "Ten Feet Tall", 1992 song by punk band Samiam from Billy
- "Ten Feet Tall and Bulletproof" (song), title track from above album by Travis Tritt
- "Ten Feet Tall", 1986 song by Eric Martin
- "Ten Feet Tall (II)", 2015 song by Passion Pit from the album Kindred
- "Ten Feet Tall", 2018 song by Cavetown from the album Lemon Boy

== Other uses ==
- Ten Feet Tall, a short film by Aaron Wilson (director)

== See also ==
- A Boy Ten Feet Tall, 1963 British film directed by Alexander Mackendrick
- A Man Is Ten Feet Tall, a screenplay by Robert Alan Aurthur produced as the final episode of The Philco Television Playhouse
- "A Man is Ten Feet Tall", 1956 song by Dick Williams
- "Little Man...Ten Feet Tall", episode 34 of season 4 of Bonanza
- "Love Makes You Feel Ten Feet Tall", 1970 song by The Velvet Underground from Loaded
