= It's All About to Change =

Studio album by Travis Tritt
- Released: May 28, 1991
- Recorded: 1990–1991
- Genre: Country
- Length: 33:22
- Label: Warner Bros. Nashville
- Producer: Gregg Brown

Travis Tritt chronology
Country Club (1990)	It's All About to Change (1991)	T-R-O-U-B-L-E (1992)

Singles from It's All About to Change
- 1. "Here's a Quarter (Call Someone Who Cares)" Released: May 7, 1991; 2. "Anymore" Released: September 2, 1991; 3. "The Whiskey Ain't Workin'" Released: November 11, 1991; 4. "Nothing Short of Dying" Released: February 24, 1992

Professional ratings
Review scores
Source	Rating
AllMusic	4.5/5 stars
Chicago Tribune	3.5/4 stars
Entertainment Weekly	A+
Los Angeles Times	2.5/5 stars

It's All About to Change is the second studio album by American country music singer Travis Tritt, released on Warner Bros. Records in 1991. The tracks "The Whiskey Ain't Workin'", "Nothing Short of Dying", "Anymore", and "Here's a Quarter (Call Someone Who Cares)" were released as singles; "Bible Belt" also charted from unsolicited airplay. "Anymore" was the second single of Tritt's career to reach Number One on the Hot Country Songs charts. Overall, this is Tritt's highest-certified album; with sales of over three million copies in the U.S., it has been certified 3× Platinum by the RIAA.

In collaboration with the band Little Feat, Tritt recorded the song "Bible Belt" about "an adulterous assistant preacher". He then rewrote the lyrics to reflect the titular character of My Cousin Vinny, portrayed by Joe Pesci, and this placement gained him some exposure.

== Track listing ==
CD
No.	Title	Writer(s)	Length
1.	"The Whiskey Ain't Workin'" (duet with Marty Stuart)	Ronny Scaife, Marty Stuart	2:40
2.	"Don't Give Your Heart to a Rambler"	Jimmie Skinner	3:40
3.	"Anymore"	Travis Tritt, Jill Colucci	3:48
4.	"Here's a Quarter (Call Someone Who Cares)"	Tritt	2:32
5.	"Bible Belt" (featuring Little Feat)	Tritt	2:50
6.	"It's All About to Change"	Tritt	3:06
7.	"Nothing Short of Dying"	Tritt	3:50
8.	"If Hell Had a Jukebox"	Tritt, Lee Rogers	3:17
9.	"Someone For Me"	Tritt, Stewart Harris	4:00
10.	"Homesick"	Buddy Buie, J.R. Cobb	4:06
Total length:			33:49

== Personnel ==
From It's All About to Change liner notes.

Musicians

- Chris Austin - mandolin (2), banjo (2), backing vocals (2)
- Sam Bacco - timpani (3, 4), percussion (3, 4, 9), marimba (7), maracas (7), congas (9)
- Grace Bahng - cello (9)
- Richard Bennett - electric guitar (1, 2, 3, 4, 7, 10), tic tac bass (6), acoustic guitar (8), twelve-string guitar (8), Danelectro (8)
- Mike Brignardello - bass guitar (except 5)
- Larry Byrom - acoustic guitar (1, 2, 3, 4, 6, 7, 8, 9), slide guitar (10)
- John Cowan - backing vocals (2, 4, 5)
- Wendell Cox - electric guitar (2, 4)
- Terry Crisp - steel guitar (1, 4, 6, 7)
- David Davidson - violin (9)
- Stuart Duncan - fiddle (1, 2, 4, 7, 8)
- Paul Franklin - pedal steel guitar (8), baritone steel guitar (8), The Box (8, 9)
- Jack Holder - electric guitar (9, 10)
- Bernie Leadon - acoustic guitar (2), electric guitar (4), mandola (9), mandocello (9)
- Chris Leuzinger - acoustic guitar (7), Dobro (7)
- Dennis Locorriere - backing vocals (1, 10)
- Mac McAnally - acoustic guitar (3, 6)
- Dana McVicker - backing vocals (3, 5, 10)
- Phil Madeira - Hammond B-3 organ (4)
- Edgar Meyer - conductor (9)
- Mark O'Connor - fiddle (6)
- Bobby Ogdin - piano (3, 6), harpsichord (3)
- Tim Passmore - backing vocals (1, 2, 4)
- Bill Payne - piano (2, 8, 10), Hammond B-3 organ (10)
- Hargus "Pig" Robbins - piano (7)
- Matt Rollings - piano (1, 4, 9)
- Jimmy Joe Ruggiere - harmonica (1, 2, 4, 5, 6, 8, 10)
- Russell Smith - backing vocals (4)
- Marty Stuart - electric guitar (1), vocals (1)
- Chris Teal - violin (9)
- Travis Tritt - lead vocals (all tracks)
- Tanya Tucker - backing vocals (9)
- Steve Turner - drums (except 5), cowbell (10)
- Billy Joe Walker Jr. - electric guitar (1, 2, 4, 6, 8, 10), acoustic guitar (3, 7, 8, 9)
- Kris Wilkinson - viola (9)
- Dennis Wilson - backing vocals (6, 7, 8)
- Curtis Young - backing vocals (6, 7, 8)
- Reggie Young - electric guitar (2, 3, 6, 7, 8, 10)

"The C.M.B. singers" on "Bible Belt": Kimberly Hughes, Matlen Latson, Rosa McLore, Helen Plummer, Sandra Prewitt, Patricia Snell, Robin Snell, Cherry Streeter, Lois Streeter, Willie Streeter, Christine Weston

Little Feat, as featured on "Bible Belt"

- Paul Barrere - electric and slide guitars
- Sam Clayton - congas, tambourine
- Kenny Gradney - bass guitar
- Richie Hayward - drums
- Bill Payne - piano, Hammond B-3 organ
- Fred Tackett - electric guitar

Technical

- Gregg Brown - production
- Carlos Grier - digital editing
- Chris Hammond - recording, mixing (6, 7, 9)
- John Hampton - mixing (except 6, 7, 9)
- Mike Poole - engineering
- Denny Purcell - mastering
- Clarke Schleicher - engineering
- Alan Schulman - engineering

== Charts ==
=== Weekly charts ===
Chart (1991)	Peak position
Canadian Country Albums (RPM)	3
US Billboard 200	22
US Top Country Albums (Billboard)	2

=== Year-end charts ===
Chart (1991)	P0sition
US Billboard 200	67
US Top Country Albums (Billboard)	21
Chart (1992)	P0sition
US Billboard 200	46
US Top Country Albums (Billboard)	9
Chart (1993)	P0sition
US Top Country Albums (Billboard)	57

== Certifications ==
Region	Certification	Certified units/sales
Canada (Music Canada)	Platinum	100,000^{^}
United States (RIAA)	3× Platinum	3,000,000^{^}
United States (RIAA) Video	Gold	50,000^{^}
^{^} Shipments figures based on certification alone.
