= Greatest Hits: From the Beginning =

Greatest Hits: From the Beginning may refer to:

- Greatest Hits: From the Beginning (Travis Tritt album)
- Greatest Hits: From the Beginning (The Miracles album)
