= Country Club (album) =

Studio album by Travis Tritt
- Released: February 22, 1990
- Recorded: 1988–1989
- Studios: Ardent Studios (Memphis TN), The Castle (Franklin TN), The Loft, Javelina Studios, Masterfonics, The Money Pit, Nightingale Recording Studio, Omnisound Studio, and Treasure Isle (Nashville TN)
- Genre: Country
- Length: 43:43
- Label: Warner Bros. Nashville
- Producer: Gregg Brown

Travis Tritt chronology
Proud of the Country (1987)	Country Club (1990)	It's All About to Change (1991)

Singles from Country Club
- 1. "Country Club" Released: August 7, 1989; 2. "Help Me Hold On" Released: February 8, 1990; 3. "I'm Gonna Be Somebody" Released: May 24, 1990; 4. "Put Some Drive in Your Country" Released: September 22, 1990; 5. "Drift Off to Dream" Released: January 8, 1991

Professional ratings
Review scores
Source	Rating
AllMusic	3.5/5 stars
Chicago Tribune	3.5/4 stars
Entertainment Weekly	B−

Country Club is the debut studio album by American country music artist Travis Tritt, released in 1990 by Warner Bros. Records. The tracks "Country Club", "I'm Gonna Be Somebody", "Help Me Hold On", "Drift Off to Dream", and "Put Some Drive in Your Country" were released as singles. Of these, "Help Me Hold On" was a Number One hit on the Billboard Hot Country Singles & Tracks (now Hot Country Songs) charts; all the other singles except for "Put Some Drive in Your Country" reached Top Ten.

== Track listing ==
CD
No.	Title	Writer(s)	Length
1.	"Country Club"	Catesby Jones, Dennis Lord	3:10
2.	"I'm Gonna Be Somebody"	Stewart Harris, Jill Colucci	4:04
3.	"Put Some Drive in Your Country"	Travis Tritt	4:19
4.	"Help Me Hold On"	Tritt, Pat Terry	4:00
5.	"Sign of the Times"	Tritt	5:17
6.	"Son of the New South"	Tritt, Larry Alderman	2:57
7.	"If I Were a Drinker"	Zack Turner, Tim Nichols	3:59
8.	"The Road Home"	Harris, Jim McBride	4:39
9.	"Drift Off to Dream"	Tritt, Harris	5:15
10.	"Dixie Flyer"	Susan Longacre, Russell Smith, Jim Photoglo	6:03
Total length:			43:43

== Personnel ==
As listed in liner notes.

Musicians

- Chris Austin – banjo (10)
- Sam Bacco – timpani (5, 7), percussion (7, 9), suspended cymbal (9)
- Mike Brignardello – bass guitar
- Gregg Brown – acoustic guitar (4)
- Larry Byrom – acoustic guitar (except 3), slide guitar (3, 6, 8), electric guitar solo (4)
- Wendell Cox – electric guitar solo (2)
- Terry Crisp – Steel guitar (1, 5, 6, 8, 10)
- Jerry Douglas – Dobro (9)
- Paul Franklin – Steel guitar (2, 4, 6, 7, 8), Acoustic lap steel (2)
- Gregg Galbraith – electric guitar (1, 5, 6, 8, 10)
- Jack Holder – electric guitar (2)
- Dennis Locorriere – backing vocals (1, 8)
- Dana McVicker – backing vocals (1, 2, 3, 4, 9, 10)
- Edgar Meyer – double bass (7, 9)
- Mark O'Connor – fiddle (except 3)
- Bobby Ogdin – piano (2, 3, 7, 9), keyboards (2, 3)
- Mike Rojas – piano (1, 4, 5, 6, 7, 8, 10)
- Jim "Jimmy Joe" Ruggiere – harmonica (1–6, 8, 10)
- Travis Tritt – lead vocals
- Steve Turner – drums, percussion (2, 8, 9), folding chair (10)
- Billy Joe Walker Jr. – electric guitar (3, 7), acoustic guitar (9)
- Kent Wells – electric guitar (4)
- Terri Williams – backing vocals (9)
- Dennis Wilson – backing vocals (5, 10)
- Curtis Young – backing vocals (5, 10)
- Reggie Young – electric guitar (2, 3, 4, 7, 9)

Technical

- Gregg Brown – producer
- Robert Charles – engineer
- Carlos Grier – digital editing
- Scott Gunter – engineer
- Chris Hammond – recording (2, 3, 7, 9), engineer, mixing (3, 4, 7, 9, 10)
- John Hampton – mixing (2)
- Scott Hendricks – mixing (1, 5, 6, 8)
- Daniel Johnston – engineer
- Patrick Kelly – engineer
- Julian King – engineer
- Mark Nevers – engineer
- Gary Paczosa – engineer
- Mike Poole – recording (1, 4, 5, 6, 8, 10)
- Denny Purcell – mastering
- Dave Sinko – engineer
- Carry Summers – engineer

== Charts ==
=== Weekly charts ===
Chart (1990)	Peak position
US Billboard 200	70
US Top Country Albums (Billboard)	3

=== Year-end charts ===
Chart (1990)	Position
US Top Country Albums (Billboard)	11
Chart (1991)	Position
US Top Country Albums (Billboard)	10
Chart (1992)	Position
US Top Country Albums (Billboard)	39

== Certifications ==
Region	Certification	Certified units/sales
Canada (Music Canada)	Gold	50,000^{^}
United States (RIAA)	2× Platinum	2,000,000^{^}
^{^} Shipments figures based on certification alone.
