= No More Looking over My Shoulder =

No More Looking Over My Shoulder

Studio album by Travis Tritt
- Released: October 13, 1998
- Genre: Country
- Length: 37:48
- Label: Warner Bros. Nashville
- Producer: Travis Tritt; Billy Joe Walker, Jr.

Travis Tritt chronology
The Restless Kind (1996)	No More Looking Over My Shoulder (1998)	Down the Road I Go (2000)

Singles from No More Looking Over My Shoulder
- 1. "No More Looking Over My Shoulder" Released: January 2, 1999

Professional ratings
Review scores
Source	Rating
AllMusic	2.5/5 stars
Entertainment Weekly	B

No More Looking over My Shoulder is American country music artist Travis Tritt's sixth studio album, released on October 13, 1998. It was the last album to be released by Warner Bros. Records before leaving for Columbia Records in 2000. Three singles were released from this album, in order of release they were: "If I Lost You", the title track, and "Start The Car", although the latter became the first single of his career to miss Top 40 on the country charts.

== Content ==
The album's title track was co-written by Michael Peterson, who also recorded it on his 2004 album Modern Man. Peterson contributes a backing vocal to Tritt's version.

== Critical reception ==
Michael Gallucci of AllMusic criticized Tritt's Southern rock influences by saying that it made the album sound "conspicuously way out of time." He thought that "If I Lost You" was the most country-influenced song and strongest track.

== Track listing ==
CD
No.	Title	Writer(s)	Length
1.	"No More Looking Over My Shoulder"	Craig Wiseman, Michael Peterson	3:49
2.	"Rough Around the Edges"	J.P. Pennington, Larry Cordle, Les Taylor	3:50
3.	"If I Lost You"	Travis Tritt, Stewart Harris	3:49
4.	"Girls Like That"	Tritt, Bruce Ray Brown	3:02
5.	"For You"	Tritt, Brown	3:47
6.	"I'm All the Man"	Tritt	3:52
7.	"Tougher Than the Rest"	Bruce Springsteen	4:15
8.	"Start the Car"	Jude Cole	4:12
9.	"Mission of Love"	Cordle, Leslie Satcher	3:30
10.	"The Road to You"	Tritt, Gary Baker, Frank J. Myers	3:59
Total length:			38:05

== Personnel ==
As listed in liner notes.

=== Musicians ===
- Eddie Bayers – drums, percussion
- Richard Bennett – acoustic guitar
- Bekka Bramlett – background vocals
- Larry Byrom – acoustic guitar
- Jude Cole – electric guitar
- Thom Flora – background vocals
- Paul Franklin – steel guitar
- Barry Green – trombone
- Rob Hajacos – fiddle
- Aubrey Haynie – fiddle
- Jim Horn – tenor saxophone, horn arrangements
- David Hungate – bass guitar
- Paul Leim – drums
- Brent Mason – electric guitar
- Dana McVicker – background vocals
- Steve Nathan – Hammond B-3 organ, keyboards
- Steve Patrick – trumpet
- Michael Peterson – background vocals
- Hargus "Pig" Robbins – piano
- Matt Rollings – piano
- Charles Rose – trombone
- John Wesley Ryles – background vocals
- Travis Tritt – lead vocals, background vocals
- Robby Turner – steel guitar
- Billy Joe Walker Jr. – acoustic guitar, electric guitar
- Biff Watson – acoustic guitar
- Dennis Wilson – background vocals
- Glenn Worf – bass guitar
- Curtis Wright – background vocals
- Curtis Young – background vocals
- Reggie Young – electric guitar

=== Production ===
- Amy Frigo – recording assistant
- Tyler Gish – overdub assistant
- Steve Lowery – overdub assistant
- Patrick Murphy – assistant
- Benny Quinn – mastering
- Alan Schulman – overdubs
- Glenn Spinner – recording assistant
- Chris Stone – overdubs, overdub assistant
- David Thoener – recording
- Travis Tritt – producer
- Billy Joe Walker Jr. – producer
- Matt Weeks – recording assistant

== Chart performance ==
Chart (1998)	Peak position
U.S. Billboard Top Country Albums	15
U.S. Billboard 200	119
