= Strong Enough to Be Your Man =

Single by Travis Tritt

from the album Strong Enough
- B-side: "Modern Day Bonnie and Clyde"
- Released: July 6, 2002
- Genre: Country
- Length: 3:48
- Label: Columbia Nashville
- Songwriter: Travis Tritt
- Producers: Billy Joe Walker Jr., Travis Tritt

Travis Tritt singles chronology
"Modern Day Bonnie and Clyde" (2002)	"Strong Enough to Be Your Man" (2002)	"Country Ain't Country" (2003)

"Strong Enough to Be Your Man" is a song written and recorded by American country music artist Travis Tritt. It was released in July 2002 as the first single from the album Strong Enough. The song reached number 13 on the Billboard Hot Country Singles & Tracks chart.

It is an answer song to Sheryl Crow's 1994 single "Strong Enough".

== Chart performance ==
Chart (2002)	Peak position
US Hot Country Songs (Billboard)	13
US Bubbling Under Hot 100 (Billboard)	2
