= Ten Feet Tall and Bulletproof =

Studio album by Travis Tritt
- Released: May 10, 1994
- Recorded: 1993
- Genre: Country
- Length: 42:08
- Label: Warner Bros. Nashville
- Producer: Gregg Brown

Travis Tritt chronology
A Travis Tritt Christmas: Loving Time of the Year (1992)	Ten Feet Tall and Bulletproof (1994)	Greatest Hits: From the Beginning (1995)

Singles from Ten Feet Tall and Bulletproof
- 1. "Foolish Pride" Released: March 29, 1994; 2. "Ten Feet Tall and Bulletproof" Released: August 6, 1994; 3. "Between an Old Memory and Me" Released: November 21, 1994; 4. "Tell Me I Was Dreaming" Released: April 3, 1995

Professional ratings
Review scores
Source	Rating
Allmusic	link
Chicago Tribune	link
Entertainment Weekly	B− link
Los Angeles Times	link
Rolling Stone	link

Ten Feet Tall and Bulletproof is the fourth studio album by American country music artist Travis Tritt. It was released on Warner Bros. Records in 1994. The tracks "Ten Feet Tall and Bulletproof", "Between an Old Memory and Me", "Foolish Pride", and "Tell Me I Was Dreaming" were released as singles, all charting in the Top 40 on the country charts. "Between an Old Memory and Me" was previously recorded by Keith Whitley on his 1989 album I Wonder Do You Think of Me. The album has been certificated 2× Platinum for sales of over 2,000,000 in the US.

== Track listing ==
CD
No.	Title	Writer(s)	Length
1.	"Ten Feet Tall and Bulletproof"	Travis Tritt	3:31
2.	"Walkin' All Over My Heart"	Paul Overstreet, Al Gore	3:11
3.	"Foolish Pride"	Tritt	4:19
4.	"Outlaws Like Us" (featuring Hank Williams Jr. and Waylon Jennings)	Tritt	4:10
5.	"Hard Times and Misery"	Marty Stuart	3:14
6.	"Tell Me I Was Dreaming"	Tritt, Bruce Ray Brown	6:27
7.	"Wishful Thinking"	Tritt, Brown	3:08
8.	"Between an Old Memory and Me"	Keith Stegall, Charlie Craig	4:05
9.	"No Vacation from the Blues"	Tritt, Gary Rossington	5:00
10.	"Southern Justice"	Stewart Harris, Jim McBride	5:13
Total length:			42:18

== Personnel ==
The following credits are sourced from liner notes.

=== Main band ===
- Mike Brignardello – bass guitar
- Larry Byrom – acoustic guitar, slide guitar
- Hargus "Pig" Robbins – piano
- Travis Tritt – lead vocals
- Steve Turner – drums, percussion
- Billy Joe Walker, Jr. – electric guitar, acoustic guitar
- Reggie Young – electric guitar, 6-string bass guitar

=== Additional musicians ===
"Ten Feet Tall and Bulletproof"

- Stuart Duncan – fiddle
- Wendell Cox – electric guitar
- Terry Crisp – steel guitar
- Dennis Locorriere – backing vocals
- Jimmy Joe Ruggiere – harmonica

"Walkin' All Over My Heart"

- Sam Bacco – tambourine
- Aaron Braun – tremolo guitar
- Mark O'Connor – fiddle
- John Cowan – background vocals
- Terry Crisp – steel guitar
- Billy Livsey – Hammond organ, Wurlitzer electric piano

"Foolish Pride"

- Sam Bacco – percussion, tambourine, timpani
- Mark O'Connor – fiddle
- Paul Franklin – steel guitar
- Billy Livsey – hammond organ, Wurlitzer electric piano, harmonium
- Dennis Locorriere – backing vocals
- Dana McVicker – backing vocals

"Outlaws Like Us"

- Stuart Duncan – fiddle
- Paul Franklin – steel guitar
- Jack Holder – electric and acoustic guitars
- Waylon Jennings – vocals
- Billy Livsey – Hammond organ, Wurlitzer electric piano
- Dennis Locorriere – backing vocals
- Jimmy Joe Ruggiere – harmonica
- Marty Stuart – background vocals
- Hank Williams Jr. – vocals

"Hard Times and Misery"

- Paul Franklin – steel guitar, "The Box"
- Billy Livsey – Hammond organ, Vox Continental
- Dennis Locorriere – background vocals
- Jimmy Joe Ruggiere – harmonica
- Marty Stuart – electric and acoustic guitars, backing vocals

"Tell Me I Was Dreaming"

- Sam Bacco – timpani
- Paul Franklin – pedal steel guitar
- Jack Holder – electric guitar
- Billy Livsey – Hammond organ
- Dennis Locorriere – backing vocals
- Dana McVicker – backing vocals

"Wishful Thinking"

- John Cowan – backing vocals
- Jack Holder – electric guitar
- Billy Livsey – Hammond organ, clavinet
- Dennis Locorriere – backing vocals
- Dana McVicker – backing vocals
- Jimmy Joe Ruggiere – harmonica

"Between an Old Memory and Me"

- John Cowan – background vocals
- Stuart Duncan – fiddle
- Paul Franklin – pedal steel guitar
- Billy Livsey – Wurlitzer electric piano, Hammond organ

"No Vacation from the Blues"

- Jack Holder – electric guitar
- Billy Livsey – Hammond organ, harmonium
- Dennis Locorriere – backing vocals
- Dana McVicker – backing vocals
- Jimmy Joe Ruggiere – harmonica
- Marty Stuart – electric guitar

"Southern Justice"

- Sam Bacco – timpani, percussion, gong
- Stuart Duncan – fiddle
- Béla Fleck – banjo
- Paul Franklin – pedal steel guitar, "The Box", baritone steel guitar
- Jack Holder – electric guitars
- Dennis Locorriere – backing vocals
- Dana McVicker – backing vocals
- Edgar Meyer – double bass
- Jimmy Joe Ruggiere – harmonica
- Matt Rollings – piano

=== Recording personnel ===
- Gregg Brown – producer
- Greg Calbi – mastering engineer
- Bob Feaster – recording engineer (except "Southern Justice"), mixing engineer
- Chris Hammond – recording engineer ("Southern Justice" only)

== Charts ==
=== Weekly charts ===
Chart (1994)	Peak position
Canadian Albums (RPM)	64
Canadian Country Albums (RPM)	3
US Billboard 200	20
US Top Country Albums (Billboard)	3

=== Year-end charts ===
Chart (1994)	Position
US Top Country Albums (Billboard)	26
Chart (1995)	Position
US Top Country Albums (Billboard)	35

== Certifications ==
Region	Certification	Certified units/sales
Canada (Music Canada)	Platinum	100,000^{^}
United States (RIAA)	2× Platinum	2,000,000^{^}
^{^} Shipments figures based on certification alone.
