= No More Looking Over My Shoulder (song) =

Single by Travis Tritt

from the album No More Looking Over My Shoulder
- B-side: "Girls Like That"
- Released: January 2, 1999
- Genre: Country
- Length: 3:49
- Label: Warner Bros. Nashville
- Songwriter(s): Michael Peterson, Craig Wiseman
- Producer(s): Billy Joe Walker Jr., Travis Tritt

Travis Tritt singles chronology
"If I Lost You" (1998)	"No More Looking Over My Shoulder" (1999)	"Start the Car" (1999)

"No Looking Over My Shoulder" is a song recorded by American country music artist Travis Tritt. It was released in January 1999 as the second single and title track from the album No More Looking Over My Shoulder. The song reached #38 on the Billboard Hot Country Singles & Tracks chart. The song was written by Michael Peterson and Craig Wiseman.

== Chart performance ==
Chart (1999)	Peak position
US Hot Country Songs (Billboard)	38
Canadian RPM Country Tracks	32
