= Country Ain't Country =

Single by Travis Tritt

from the album Strong Enough
- Released: January 25, 2003
- Genre: Country
- Length: 4:16
- Label: Columbia Nashville
- Songwriter(s): Teresa Boaz, Casey Beathard, Carson Chamberlain
- Producer(s): Billy Joe Walker Jr., Travis Tritt

Travis Tritt singles chronology
"Strong Enough to Be Your Man" (2002)	"Country Ain't Country" (2003)	"Lonesome, On'ry and Mean" (2003)

"Country Ain't Country" is a song recorded by American country music artist Travis Tritt. It was released in January 2003 as the second single from the album Strong Enough. The song reached #26 on the Billboard Hot Country Singles & Tracks chart. The song was written by Teresa Boaz, Casey Beathard and Carson Chamberlain.

== Chart performance ==
Chart (2003)	Peak position
US Hot Country Songs (Billboard)	26
