= If I Lost You =

Single by Travis Tritt

from the album No More Looking Over My Shoulder
- B-side: "Start the Car"
- Released: August 29, 1998
- Genre: Country
- Length: 3:49
- Label: Warner Bros. Nashville
- Songwriter(s): Travis Tritt, Stewart Harris
- Producer(s): Billy Joe Walker Jr., Travis Tritt

Travis Tritt singles chronology
"Still in Love with You" (1997)	"If I Lost You" (1998)	"No More Looking Over My Shoulder" (1999)

"If I Lost You" is a song co-written and recorded by American country music artist Travis Tritt. It was released in August 1998 as the first single from the album No More Looking Over My Shoulder. The song reached #29 on the Billboard Hot Country Singles & Tracks chart. The song was written by Tritt and Stewart Harris.

== Chart performance ==
Chart (1998)	Peak position
US Hot Country Songs (Billboard)	29
US Billboard Hot 100	86
Canadian RPM Country Tracks	26
