= A Travis Tritt Christmas: Loving Time of the Year =

Studio album by Travis Tritt
- Released: September 29, 1992
- Recorded: 1992
- Genre: Country
- Length: 40:15
- Label: Warner Bros. Nashville
- Producer: Gregg Brown

Travis Tritt chronology
T-R-O-U-B-L-E (1992)	A Travis Tritt Christmas: Loving Time of the Year (1992)	Ten Feet Tall and Bulletproof (1994)

Professional ratings
Review scores
Source	Rating
Allmusic	2.5/5 stars
Robert Christgau	(1-star Honorable Mention)

A Travis Tritt Christmas: Loving Time of the Year is the first Christmas music album by American country music singer Travis Tritt. It was released September 29, 1992, via Warner Bros. Records. The album includes a mix of traditional songs, cover songs and new material.

== Content ==
This album includes three covers of country Christmas songs. "Christmas in My Hometown" was originally recorded by Sonny James on his 1966 album My Christmas Dream. "Santa Looked a Lot Like Daddy" and "All I Want for Christmas Dear Is You" were both recorded by Buck Owens on his 1965 album Christmas with Buck Owens and His Buckaroos. "Loving Time of the Year" and "Christmas Just Ain't Christmas Without You" are the only new tracks on this album.

== Track listing ==
1. "Winter Wonderland" (Felix Bernard, Dick Smith) – 2:50
2. "Christmas in My Hometown" (Sonny James, John Skye) – 2:43
3. "Santa Looked a Lot Like Daddy" (Buck Owens, Don Rich) – 2:28
4. "All I Want for Christmas Dear Is You" (Owens, Rich) – 3:04
5. "O Little Town of Bethlehem" (Phillips Brooks, Lewis Redner) – 4:55
6. "Loving Time of the Year" (Travis Tritt) – 4:06
7. "Christmas Just Ain't Christmas Without You" (Johnny Neel) – 4:33
8. "I Heard the Bells on Christmas Day" (Henry Wadsworth Longfellow, Johnny Marks) – 4:10
9. "Silver Bells" (Jay Livingston, Ray Evans) – 5:18
10. "Have Yourself a Merry Little Christmas" (Hugh Martin, Ralph Blane) – 6:05

== Chart performance ==
Chart (1992)	Peak position
U.S. Billboard Top Country Albums	23
U.S. Billboard 200	75
U.S. Billboard Top Holiday Albums	17
