= The Storm (Travis Tritt album) =

2007 album by Travis Tritt

Studio album by Travis Tritt
- Released: August 21, 2007
- Genre: Country
- Label: Category 5
- Producers: Randy Jackson; Travis Tritt

Travis Tritt chronology
The Very Best of Travis Tritt (2007)	The Storm (2007)	The Calm After... (2013)

The Calm After...

Studio album by Travis Tritt
- Released: July 9, 2013
- Genre: Country
- Label: Post Oak

Travis Tritt chronology
The Storm (2007)	The Calm After... (2013)

Professional ratings
Review scores
Source	Rating
About.com	link
AllMusic	link
Billboard	(mixed) link

The Storm is the tenth studio album by American country music artist Travis Tritt. It was also his only album for the Category 5 label. In 2013, Travis Tritt re-released the album under the new title The Calm After via his own label Post Oak Records. The re-release features two new songs consisting of classic covers.

== History ==
Five of this album's tracks are covers: "Should've Listened" was originally recorded by Canadian rock band Nickelback on their album The Long Road, "I Don't Know How I Got By" was originally recorded by Edwin McCain for the soundtrack of the film The Family Man, "You Never Take Me Dancing" was previously recorded by Richard Marx on his album Flesh and Bone, "Somehow, Somewhere, Someway" was written/recorded by Kenny Wayne Shepherd from his 1997 album Trouble Is..., and "The Pressure Is On" is the title cut of a 1981 album release by Hank Williams, Jr. "You Never Take Me Dancing" was released as a single from this album, reaching number 27 on the Hot Country Songs chart in 2007. It was followed by "Something Stronger Than Me", which failed to chart. Category 5 closed soon afterward.

In 2013, Tritt acquired the rights to the album in order to re-release it via his own Post Oak Records under the title The Calm After... The re-release includes a cover of the Patty Smyth and Don Henley duet "Sometimes Love Just Ain't Enough" with his daughter, Tyler Reese, and a cover of Faces' "Stay with Me". The Calm After... sold more than 2,000 copies in its opening week and entered the Country Albums chart at number 31.

== Track listing ==
CD
No.	Title	Writer(s)	Length
1.	"Mudcat Moan (Prelude) / You Never Take Me Dancing"	Michael Thompson, Travis Tritt / Richard Marx	5:29
2.	"(I Wanna) Feel Too Much"	Diane Warren	4:03
3.	"Doesn't the Good Outweigh the Bad"	Tritt, Marx	4:23
4.	"What If Love Hangs On"	Rob Thomas, Tritt	4:02
5.	"Rub Off on Me"	Casey Beathard, Kevin Horne	4:40
6.	"Something Stronger Than Me"	Don Poythress, Donnie Skaggs, Michelle Little	3:39
7.	"The Storm"	Tritt	4:42
8.	"I Don't Know How I Got By"	Warren	3:45
9.	"The Pressure Is On"	Hank Williams Jr.	3:54
10.	"Should've Listened"	Mike Kroeger, Chad Kroeger, Ryan Peake, Ryan Vikedal	3:30
11.	"High Time for Gettin' Down"	John Kromer, Weston Harvey, Jay Speight	2:43
12.	"Somehow, Somewhere, Someway"	Kenny Wayne Shepherd, Danny Tate	5:42
Total length:			50:32

== Personnel (The Storm) ==
- Kenny Aronoff - drums
- Michael Atwood - cello
- Sherree Ford Brown - background vocals
- Paul Bushnell - bass guitar
- Caroline Campbell - violin
- Vinnie Colaiuta - drums
- Luis Conte - percussion
- Charlie Daniels - fiddle
- Tabitha Fair - background vocals
- Storm L. Gardner - background vocals
- Siedah Garrett - background vocals
- Sharlotte Gibson - background vocals
- James Harrah - acoustic guitar, electric guitar
- Joel Pargman - viola
- Matt Rollings - piano, Wurlitzer
- Kenny Wayne Shepherd - electric guitar
- Cameron Stone - violin
- Travis Tritt - acoustic guitar, gut string guitar, lead vocals, background vocals
- Patrick Warren - string arrangements
- Gabe Witcher - fiddle
- Jimmie Wood - harmonica

== Track listing (The Calm After) ==
1. "Mudcat Moan (Prelude)"/"You Never Take Me Dancing" - 5:29
2. "(I Wanna) Feel Too Much" - 4:03
3. "Doesn't the Good Outweigh the Bad" - 4:23
4. "Sometimes Love Just Ain't Enough" (Patty Smyth, Glen Burtnik) - 4:50
5. "What If Love Hangs On" - 4:02
6. "Rub Off on Me" - 4:40
7. "Stay with Me" (Rod Stewart, Ronnie Wood) - 4:41
8. "Something Stronger Than Me" - 3:39
9. "The Storm" - 4:42
10. "I Don't Know How I Got By" - 3:45
11. "The Pressure Is On" - 3:54
12. "Should've Listened" - 3:30
13. "High Time for Gettin' Down" - 2:43
14. "Somehow, Somewhere, Someway" - 5:42

== Personnel (The Calm After) ==
- Rusty Anderson - electric guitar
- Kenny Aronoff - drums
- Michael Atwood - cello
- Sherree Ford Brown - background vocals
- Paul Bushnell - bass guitar
- Caroline Campbell - violin
- Vinnie Colaiuta - drums
- Luis Conte - percussion
- Jim Cox - Hammond B-3 organ
- Charlie Daniels - fiddle
- Tabitha Fair - background vocals
- Mike Finnigan - Hammond B-3 organ, piano
- Storm L. Gardner - background vocals
- Siedah Garrett - background vocals
- Sharlotte Gibson - background vocals
- James Harrah - acoustic guitar, electric guitar
- Greg Leisz - pedal steel guitar
- Joel Pargman - viola
- Matt Rollings - piano, Wurlitzer
- Kenny Wayne Shepherd - electric guitar
- Cameron Stone - violin
- Michael Thompson - acoustic guitar, electric guitar
- Travis Tritt - acoustic guitar, gut string guitar, lead vocals, background vocals
- Tyler Reese Tritt - vocals on "Sometimes Love Just Ain't Enough"
- Patrick Warren - string arrangements
- Gabe Witcher - fiddle
- Jimmie Wood - harmonica

== Chart performance ==
=== The Storm ===
Chart (2007)	Peak position
U.S. Billboard Top Country Albums	3
U.S. Billboard 200	28
U.S. Billboard Independent Albums	3

=== The Calm After... ===
Chart (2013)	Peak position
U.S. Billboard Top Country Albums	31
U.S. Billboard 200	190
U.S. Billboard Independent Albums	39
