= Put Some Drive in Your Country =

Single by Travis Tritt

from the album Country Club
- B-side: "If I Were a Drinker"
- Released: September 22, 1990
- Recorded: 1989
- Genre: Country; country rock; Southern rock
- Length: 4:20
- Label: Warner Bros. Nashville 19797
- Songwriter: Travis Tritt
- Producer: Gregg Brown

Travis Tritt singles chronology
"I'm Gonna Be Somebody" (1990)	"Put Some Drive in Your Country" (1990)	"Drift Off to Dream" (1991)

"Put Some Drive in Your Country" is a song written and recorded by American country music artist Travis Tritt. It was released in September 1990 as the fourth single from his debut album Country Club.

== Content ==
The song is an up-tempo country rock song in which Tritt proclaims his influences, paying homage to Roy Acuff, George Jones, Hank Williams Jr. and Waylon Jennings as well. In the song, Tritt defines his style singing "I made myself a promise, when I was just a kid: I'd mix Southern rock and country, and that's just what I did".

== Critical reception ==
Stephen Thomas Erlewine by Allmusic said that "[the song], which had a clear rock & roll influence, stalled at #28, since radio programmers were reluctant to feature such blatantly rock-derived music".

== Personnel ==
The following musicians play on this track:

- Mike Brignardello – bass guitar
- Larry Byrom – slide guitar
- Dana McVicker – background vocals
- Bobby Ogdin – piano, keyboards
- Jim "Jimmy Joe" Ruggiere – harmonica
- Steve Turner – drums, percussion
- Billy Joe Walker Jr. – electric guitar
- Reggie Young – electric guitar

== Chart performance ==
Chart (1990)	Peak position
Canada Country Singles (RPM)	23
US Hot Country Songs (Billboard)	28
