= Honky Tonkin's What I Do Best (song) =

Single by Marty Stuart with Travis Tritt

from the album Honky Tonkin's What I Do Best
- B-side: "Me & Hank & Jumpin' Jack Flash"
- Released: April 1996
- Studio: Sound Emporium (Nashville, Tennessee)
- Genre: Country
- Length: 3:03
- Label: MCA
- Songwriter: Marty Stuart
- Producers: Tony Brown, Justin Niebank

Marty Stuart singles chronology
"If I Ain't Got You" (1995)	"Honky Tonkin's What I Do Best" (1996)	"Thanks to You" (1996)

Travis Tritt singles chronology
"Sometimes She Forgets" (1995)	"Honky Tonkin's What I Do Best" (1996)	"More Than You'll Ever Know" (1996)

"Honky Tonkin's What I Do Best" is a song written by Marty Stuart, and recorded by American country music artists Stuart and Travis Tritt. It was released in April 1996 as the first single and title track from the album Honky Tonkin's What I Do Best. The song reached number 23 on the Billboard Hot Country Singles & Tracks chart and peaked at number 8 on the RPM Country Tracks chart in Canada. It was nominated for the 1997 Grammy Award for Best Country Collaboration with Vocals, but lost to High Lonesome Sound by Vince Gill. It was also nominated for a CMA Vocal Event Of The Year Award in 1996.

== Music video ==
The music video was directed by Michael Merriman and premiered in May 1996.

== Chart performance ==
Chart (1996)	Peak position
Canada Country Singles (RPM)	8
US Hot Country Songs (Billboard)	23

=== Year-end charts ===
Chart (1996)	Position
Canada Country Tracks (RPM)	78
