= Strong Enough (Travis Tritt album) =

Studio album by Travis Tritt
- Released: September 24, 2002
- Genre: Country
- Length: 43:43
- Label: Columbia Nashville
- Producer: Travis Tritt; Billy Joe Walker, Jr.

Travis Tritt chronology
Down the Road I Go (2000)	Strong Enough (2002)	My Honky Tonk History (2004)

Singles from Strong Enough to Be Your Man
- 1. "Strong Enough to Be Your Man" Released: July 6, 2002; 2. "Country Ain't Country" Released: January 25, 2003

Professional ratings
Review scores
Source	Rating
About.com	(favorable)
Allmusic	3/5 stars
Entertainment Weekly	A−
People	(positive)

Strong Enough is American country music artist Travis Tritt's eighth studio album, released on Columbia Records Nashville in 2002. The tracks "Strong Enough To Be Your Man" (an answer song to Sheryl Crow's 1995 single "Strong Enough") and "Country Ain't Country" were released as singles, respectively reaching #13 and #26 on the Billboard country charts.

== Track listing ==
CD
No.	Title	Writer(s)	Length
1.	"You Can't Count Me Out Yet"	Travis Tritt	3:24
2.	"Can't Tell Me Nothin'"	Steve Bogard, Rick Giles	3:21
3.	"Strong Enough to Be Your Man"	Tritt	3:48
4.	"Country Ain't Country"	Teresa Boaz, Carson Chamberlain, Casey Beathard	4:16
5.	"If You're Going to Straighten Up (Brother Now's the Time)"	Tritt, Dennis Robbins, Bob DiPiero	3:10
6.	"Doesn't Anyone Hurt Anymore"	Tritt, Robbins, Troy Seals	3:31
7.	"You Really Wouldn't Want Me That Way"	Tritt, Beathard, Walt Aldridge	4:02
8.	"I Don't Ever Want Her to Feel That Way Again"	Tritt, Dean Dillon	3:35
9.	"Time to Get Crazy"	Tritt, Gary Nicholson	3:22
10.	"Now I've Seen It All"	Tritt, Aldridge, James LeBlanc	3:47
11.	"God Must Be a Woman"	Vernon Rust	4:01
12.	"I Can't Seem to Get over You"	Tritt, Marty Stuart	3:07
Total length:			43:24

== Personnel ==
Compiled from liner notes.

Musicians

- Eddie Bayers — percussion (track 7)
- Mike Brignardello — bass guitar (tracks 2, 5, 8–11)
- John Cowan — backing vocals (tracks 4, 9, 12)
- Lisa Cochran — backing vocals (tracks 1, 5, 9)
- Melodie Crittenden — backing vocals (tracks 2, 3, 4, 6, 10)
- Dan Dugmore — steel guitar
- Aubrey Haynie — fiddle
- Wes Hightower — backing vocals (track 11)
- John Barlow Jarvis — piano, keyboards
- Kirk "Jellyroll" Johnson — harmonica (track 5)
- Bob Mason — cello (track 8)
- Brent Mason — electric guitar
- Mac McAnally — acoustic guitar
- Greg Morrow — drums
- Marty Stuart — electric guitar (track 12)
- Neil Thrasher — backing vocals (tracks 1–3, 5, 6, 10)
- Travis Tritt — lead and backing vocals
- Billy Joe Walker Jr. — electric guitar (tracks 3, 4), acoustic guitar (tracks 4, 11)
- Glenn Worf — bass guitar (tracks 1, 3, 4, 6, 7, 12)
- Curtis Young — backing vocals (track 8)
- Reggie Young — electric guitar
- Andrea Zonn — backing vocals (tracks 4, 11, 12)

Technical

- Chuck Ainlay — mixing (except track 3)
- Ed Seay — mixing (track 3 only)
- Steve Tillisch — recording
- Travis Tritt — production
- Billy Joe Walker, Jr. — production
- Bergen White — string arrangements

== Charts ==
=== Weekly charts ===
Chart (2002)	Peak position
US Billboard 200	27
US Top Country Albums (Billboard)	4

=== Year-end charts ===
Chart (2002)	Position
US Top Country Albums (Billboard)	69
Chart (2003)	Position
US Top Country Albums (Billboard)	70
