= Between an Old Memory and Me =

Single by Travis Tritt

from the album Ten Feet Tall and Bulletproof
- B-side: "Wishful Thinking"
- Released: November 21, 1994
- Genre: Country
- Length: 4:05
- Label: Warner Bros. Nashville
- Songwriters: Keith Stegall, Charlie Craig
- Producer: Gregg Brown

Travis Tritt singles chronology
"Ten Feet Tall and Bulletproof" (1994)	"Between an Old Memory and Me" (1994)	"Tell Me I Was Dreaming" (1995)

"Between an Old Memory and Me" is a song written by Keith Stegall and Charlie Craig. It was originally recorded by American country music artist Keith Whitley for his 1989 album, I Wonder Do You Think of Me. It was then recorded by Travis Tritt and released in November 1994 as the third single from his 1994 album Ten Feet Tall and Bulletproof. It peaked at number 11 on the United States Billboard Hot Country Singles & Tracks chart, and at number 3 on the Canadian RPM Country Singles & Tracks chart.

== Critical reception ==
Deborah Evans Price, of Billboard magazine reviewed the song favorably, saying "leave it to ol' Travis to remind us that, as long as people drink, there will be drinking songs." She goes on to say that it "takes a lot of chutzpah to tackle an old Keith Whitley number, but Tritt rises to the challenge here, reminding us what a terrific song this is."

== Chart positions ==
"Between an Old Memory and Me" debuted at number 63 on the U.S. Billboard Hot Country Singles & Tracks for the week of November 26, 1994.

Chart (1994–1995)	Peak position
Canada Country Singles (RPM)	3
US Hot Country Songs (Billboard)	11

=== Year-end charts ===
Chart (1995)	Position
Canada Country Tracks (RPM)	69
