= Foolish Pride (Travis Tritt song) =

Single by Travis Tritt

from the album Ten Feet Tall and Bulletproof
- B-side: "No Vacation from the Blues"
- Released: March 29, 1994
- Genre: Country
- Length: 4:19
- Label: Warner Bros. Nashville 18180
- Songwriter: Travis Tritt
- Producer: Gregg Brown

Travis Tritt singles chronology
"Take It Easy" (1994)	"Foolish Pride" (1994)	"Ten Feet Tall and Bulletproof" (1994)

"Foolish Pride" is a song written and recorded by American country music singer Travis Tritt. It was released in March 1994 as the first single from his album Ten Feet Tall and Bulletproof. The song peaked at Number One on the U.S. country singles charts in July 1994, becoming the fourth Number One hit of his career.

== Content ==
"Foolish Pride" is a mid-tempo ballad detailing a failed relationship, in which both halves are afraid to show each other their feelings out of pride.

== Critical reception ==
Reviewing Ten Feet Tall and Bulletproof for Allmusic, Brian Mansfield cited "Foolish Pride" as a standout track, saying that it "rival[s] 'Anymore' for power and Skynyrd and Bob Seger for production values." Rolling Stone critic Jim Bessman also described the song favorably in his review of the album, calling it "a power ballad that shows that Tritt can be as tender and compassionate as [Randy] Travis." Deborah Evans Price, of Billboard magazine reviewed the song favorably, saying that Tritt "delivers a big message about the little fights that turn into huge irreconcilable differences." She goes on to call it "another solid song, and a welcome sentiment at a time when everybody seems to be reaching for the gun."

== Music video ==
The music video was directed by Gustavo Garzon and premiered in mid-1994.

It features a "ghost" (Travis Tritt) admonishing the couple to come together, rather than succumb to "foolish pride".

== Chart performance ==
"Foolish Pride" was released in early 1994. In July of the same year, it reached the top of the country singles charts in both U.S. and Canada, becoming his fourth U.S. Number One. It was also his last Number One until he topped the charts again in 2000 with "Best of Intentions".

Chart (1994)	Peak position
Canada Adult Contemporary (RPM)	35
Canada Country Singles (RPM)	1
US Bubbling Under Hot 100 (Billboard)	12
US Hot Country Songs (Billboard)	1

=== Year-end charts ===
Chart (1994)	Position
Canada Country Tracks (RPM)	4
US Country Songs (Billboard)	10
