= Ten Feet Tall and Bulletproof (song) =

Single by Travis Tritt

from the album Ten Feet Tall and Bulletproof
- B-side: "Ten Feet Tall and Bulletproof (Acoustic Version)"
- Released: August 6, 1994
- Genre: Country
- Length: 3:31
- Label: Warner Bros. Nashville
- Songwriter: Travis Tritt
- Producer: Gregg Brown

Travis Tritt singles chronology
"Foolish Pride" (1994)	"Ten Feet Tall and Bulletproof" (1994)	"Between an Old Memory and Me" (1994)

"Ten Feet Tall and Bulletproof" is a song written and recorded by American country music artist Travis Tritt. It was released in August 1994 as the second single and title track from the album Ten Feet Tall and Bulletproof. The song reached number 22 on the Billboard Hot Country Singles & Tracks chart.

== Content ==
The song is about a man who plans to become intoxicated until he feels "ten feet tall and bulletproof". Tritt's bus driver, Jackie McClure, suggested the title.

Tritt's autobiography, published in 1994, was also titled Ten Feet Tall and Bulletproof.

== Music video ==
The music video was directed by Jon Small, and premiered in late 1994.

== Chart performance ==
Chart (1994)	Peak position
Canada Country Singles (RPM)	17
US Hot Country Songs (Billboard)	22
