= Anymore (Travis Tritt song) =

Single by Travis Tritt

from the album It's All About To Change
- B-side: "It's All About to Change"
- Released: September 2, 1991
- Genre: Country
- Length: 3:47
- Label: Warner Bros. Nashville
- Songwriters: Travis Tritt, Jill Colucci
- Producer: Gregg Brown

Travis Tritt singles chronology
"Here's a Quarter (Call Someone Who Cares)" (1991)	"Anymore" (1991)	"The Whiskey Ain't Workin'" (1991)

"Anymore" is a song co-written and recorded by American country music artist Travis Tritt. It was released in September 1991 as the second single from his album It's All About to Change. It peaked at No. 1 in both the United States and Canada, becoming his second of such in the United States, and his fourth in Canada. The song was written by Tritt and Jill Colucci.

== Content and history ==
Tritt co-wrote the song with Jill Colucci, who also wrote his 1990 hit "I'm Gonna Be Somebody", when the two were together on an airplane ride. Colucci presented Tritt with a melody and the two began writing lyrics together. As they had not finished writing the lyrics at the time the airplane landed, they reunited in the studio six weeks later to finish writing.

== Personnel ==
Compiled from liner notes.

- Sam Bacco – timpani, percussion
- Richard Bennett – electric guitar
- Mike Brignardello – bass guitar
- Larry Byrom – acoustic guitar
- Mac McAnally – acoustic guitar solo
- Dana McVicker – background vocals
- Bobby Ogdin – piano, harpsichord
- Steve Turner – drums
- Billy Joe Walker Jr. – acoustic guitar
- Reggie Young – electric guitar, guitar solo

== Chart positions ==
"Anymore" debuted on the US Billboard Hot Country Singles & Tracks for the week of September 14, 1991.

Chart (1991)	Peak position
Canada Country Singles (RPM)	1
US Hot Country Songs (Billboard)	1

=== Year-end charts ===
Chart (1991)	Position
Canada Country Tracks (RPM)	17
US Country Songs (Billboard)	71
