= Help Me Hold On =

Single by Travis Tritt

from the album Country Club
- B-side: "All I'll Ever Be"
- Released: February 8, 1990
- Recorded: 1989
- Genre: Country
- Length: 4:00
- Label: Warner Bros. Nashville 19918
- Songwriters: Travis Tritt, Pat Terry
- Producer: Gregg Brown

Travis Tritt singles chronology
"Country Club" (1989)	"Help Me Hold On" (1990)	"I'm Gonna Be Somebody" (1990)

"Help Me Hold On" is a song by American country music artist Travis Tritt. It was released in February 1990 as the second single from his debut album Country Club. It reached number 1 in both the United States and Canada, thus becoming Travis Tritt's first number-one hit. The song was written by Tritt and Pat Terry.

== Content ==
"Help Me Hold On" is a ballad telling of a failing relationship. In it, the male narrator asks his significant other not to abandon him, by confessing his mistakes.

== Commercial performance ==
The song reached number one on the Billboard Hot Country Songs chart. It has also sold 167,000 digital copies since it became available for download.

== Music video ==
The music video was directed by Greg Crutcher. It begins and ends with old black and white footage playing on the TV set.

== Personnel ==
The following musicians play on this track:

- Gregg Brown – acoustic guitar
- Larry Byrom – acoustic guitar, electric guitar solo
- Mike Brignardello – bass guitar
- Paul Franklin – steel guitar
- Dana McVicker – background vocals
- Mark O'Connor – fiddle
- Michael Rojas – piano
- Jim "Jimmy Joe" Ruggiere – harmonica
- Steve Turner – drums, percussion
- Kent Wells – electric guitar
- Reggie Young – electric guitar

== Chart positions ==
Chart (1990)	Peak position
Canada Country Singles (RPM)	1
US Hot Country Songs (Billboard)	1

=== Year-end charts ===
Chart (1990)	Position
Canada Country Tracks (RPM)	5
US Country Songs (Billboard)	8
