= Nothing Short of Dying =

Single by Travis Tritt

from the album It's All About To Change
- B-side: "Bible Belt"
- Released: February 24, 1992
- Genre: Country
- Length: 3:50
- Label: Warner Bros. Nashville
- Songwriter: Travis Tritt
- Producer: Gregg Brown

Travis Tritt singles chronology
"The Whiskey Ain't Workin'" (1991)	"Nothing Short of Dying" (1992)	"Lord Have Mercy on the Working Man" (1992)

"Nothing Short of Dying" is a song written and recorded by American country music artist Travis Tritt. It was released in February 1992 as the fourth and final single from Tritt's album It's All About to Change. It peaked at number 4 on the Billboard country music chart in the United States, and at number 7 on the country singles chart in Canada.

== Personnel ==
Compiled from liner notes.

- Sam Bacco — marimba, maracas
- Richard Bennett — electric guitar
- Mike Brignardello — bass guitar
- Larry Byrom — acoustic guitar
- Terry Crisp — steel guitar
- Stuart Duncan — fiddle
- Chris Leuzinger — acoustic guitar, Dobro
- Hargus "Pig" Robbins — piano
- Steve Turner — drums
- Billy Joe Walker Jr. — acoustic guitar
- Dennis Wilson — background vocals
- Curtis Young — background vocals
- Reggie Young — electric guitar

== Chart positions ==
"Nothing Short of Dying" debuted on the U.S. Billboard Hot Country Singles & Tracks for the week of March 7, 1992.

Chart (1992)	Peak position
Canada Country Singles (RPM)	4
US Hot Country Songs (Billboard)	4

=== Year-end charts ===
Chart (1992)	Position
Canada Country Tracks (RPM)	45
US Country Songs (Billboard)	45
