= Country Club (song) =

Single by Travis Tritt

from the album Country Club
- B-side: "Sign of the Times"
- Released: August 7, 1989
- Recorded: late 1988
- Genre: Country
- Length: 3:10
- Label: Warner Bros. Nashville
- Songwriters: Catesby Jones, Dennis Lord
- Producer: Gregg Brown

Travis Tritt singles chronology
"Country Club" (1989)	"Help Me Hold On" (1990)

"Country Club" is a song written by Catesby Jones and Dennis Lord, and recorded by American country music artist Travis Tritt. It was released in August 1989 as the lead single and title track from Tritt's debut album. It peaked at No. 9 in the United States, and #22 in Canada. The song had originally been cut by Alan Jackson.

== Content ==
The song is a moderate up-tempo in which the male narrator attempts to get the attention of a female who is a member of a country club. After she tells him that only members are allowed in the country club, he responds by saying that he, too, is a member of a "country club" because he likes country music. In the second verse, he continues trying to convince her even further.

== Music video ==
This was Tritt's first music video and it was directed by Jim May.

== Personnel ==
The following musicians play on this track:

- Mike Brignardello – bass guitar
- Larry Byrom – acoustic guitar
- Terry Crisp – steel guitar
- Gregg Galbraith – electric guitar
- Dennis Locorriere – background vocals
- Dana McVicker – background vocals
- Mark O'Connor – fiddle
- Mike Rojas – piano
- Jim "Jimmy Joe" Ruggiere – harmonica
- Steve Turner – drums

== Chart positions ==
Chart (1989)	Peak position
Canada Country Singles (RPM)	22
US Hot Country Songs (Billboard)	9
