= Drift Off to Dream =

Single by Travis Tritt

from the album Country Club
- B-side: "Son of the New South"
- Released: January 8, 1991
- Recorded: 1989
- Genre: Country
- Length: 5:15 (album version); 3:44 (single edit)
- Label: Warner Bros. Nashville
- Songwriters: Travis Tritt, Stewart Harris
- Producer: Gregg Brown

Travis Tritt singles chronology
"Put Some Drive in Your Country" (1990)	"Drift Off to Dream" (1991)	"Here's a Quarter (Call Someone Who Cares)" (1991)

"Drift Off to Dream" is a song co-written and recorded by American country music artist Travis Tritt. It was released in January 1991 as the fifth and final single from his debut album Country Club. It peaked at number 3 in the United States, while it became his third number-one hit in Canada. The song was written by Tritt and Stewart Harris.

== Content ==
"Drift Off to Dream" is a mid-tempo waltz. It begins with the male narrator, alone in a bar, thinking about a lover whom he would like to meet. He imagines holding hands with her on a blanket in the yard and kissing until she "drift[s] off to dream" in his arms.

== Music video ==
The music video was directed by Sherman Halsey.

== Personnel ==
The following musicians perform on this track:

- Sam Bacco – suspended cymbal, percussion
- Mike Brignardello – bass guitar
- Larry Byrom – acoustic guitar
- Jerry Douglas – Dobro
- Dana McVicker – background vocals
- Edgar Meyer – arco bass
- Mark O'Connor – fiddle
- Bobby Ogdin – piano
- Steve Turner – drums, percussion
- Billy Joe Walker Jr. – acoustic guitar
- Terri Williams – background vocals
- Reggie Young – electric guitar

== Chart positions ==
Chart (1991)	Peak position
Canada Country Singles (RPM)	1
US Hot Country Songs (Billboard)	3

=== Year-end charts ===
Chart (1991)	Position
Canada Country Tracks (RPM)	21
US Country Songs (Billboard)	33
