= Here's a Quarter (Call Someone Who Cares) =

1991 single by Travis Tritt

Single by Travis Tritt

from the album It's All About to Change
- B-side: "If Hell Had a Jukebox"
- Released: May 7, 1991
- Genre: Country
- Length: 2:32
- Label: Warner Bros. Nashville
- Songwriter: Travis Tritt
- Producer: Gregg Brown

Travis Tritt singles chronology
"Drift Off to Dream" (1991)	"Here's a Quarter (Call Someone Who Cares)" (1991)	"Anymore" (1991)

"Here's a Quarter (Call Someone Who Cares)" is a song written and recorded by American country music artist Travis Tritt. It was released in May 1991 as the lead-off single to his album It's All About to Change. It peaked at number 2 in both the United States and Canada. This is one of Tritt’s most popular songs.

== Content ==
The narrator speaks of a former significant other who regrets leaving him, and now wants to include herself in his life once again. However, the narrator no longer trusts her because of her actions.

In response, he gives her a quarter (in 1991, the common price for a local pay telephone call) and tells her to phone someone else who cares to listen.

== Music video ==
The music video was directed by Gerry Wenner. The woman playing the role of the woman wanting the narrator of the song back is Leighanne Wallace, the future wife of Backstreet Boys member Brian Littrell.

== Personnel ==
The following musicians play on this track:

- Sam Bacco — percussion, timpani
- Richard Bennett — electric guitar, second solo
- Mike Brignardello — bass guitar
- Larry Byrom — acoustic guitar
- John Cowan — background vocals
- Wendell Cox — electric guitar, first solo
- Terry Crisp — steel guitar
- Stuart Duncan — fiddle
- Bernie Leadon — electric guitar
- Phil Madeira — Hammond B-3 organ
- Tim Passmore — background vocals
- Matt Rollings — piano
- Jimmy Joe Ruggiere — harmonica
- Russell Smith — background vocals
- Steve Turner — drums
- Billy Joe Walker Jr. — electric guitar

== Chart positions ==
Chart (1991)	Peak position
Canada Country Singles (RPM)	2
US Hot Country Songs (Billboard)	2

=== Year-end charts ===
Chart (1991)	Position
Canada Country Tracks (RPM)	22
US Country Songs (Billboard)	23
