= The Whiskey Ain't Workin' =

Single by Travis Tritt and Marty Stuart

from the album It's All About To Change
- B-side: "Bible Belt"
- Released: November 11, 1991
- Recorded: 1991
- Genre: Country
- Length: 2:40
- Label: Warner Bros. Nashville
- Songwriters: Ronny Scaife; Marty Stuart
- Producer: Gregg Brown

Travis Tritt singles chronology
| "Anymore" (1991) | "The Whiskey Ain't Workin'" (1991) | "Nothing Short of Dying" (1992) |

Marty Stuart singles chronology
| "Tempted" (1991) | "The Whiskey Ain't Workin'" (1991) | "Burn Me Down" (1992) |

"The Whiskey Ain't Workin'" is a song recorded by American country music artists Travis Tritt and Marty Stuart. It was released in November 1991 as the third single from Tritt's album It's All About to Change. It peaked at number two on the Billboard country music chart in the United States, behind "A Jukebox with a Country Song" by Doug Stone, and at number four on the country singles chart in Canada. The song was written by Stuart and Ronny Scaife.

The song won both artists the Grammy Award for Best Country Collaboration with Vocals at the 34th Annual Grammy Awards in 1992.

== Music video ==
The music video is directed by Gerry Wenner. In it, Tritt and Stuart are at a bar and they wind up going to jail, but are bailed out by a woman who was also at the bar.

== Personnel ==
Compiled from liner notes.

- Richard Bennett — electric guitar
- Mike Brignardello — bass guitar
- Larry Byrom — acoustic guitar
- Terry Crisp — steel guitar
- Stuart Duncan — fiddle
- Dennis Locorriere — background vocals
- Tim Passmore — background vocals
- Matt Rollings — piano
- Jim Ruggiere — harmonica
- Marty Stuart — electric guitar solo, lead and background vocals
- Travis Tritt — lead vocals
- Steve Turner — drums
- Billy Joe Walker Jr. — electric guitar

== Chart positions ==
| Chart (1991–1992) | Peak position |
|---|---|
| Canada Country Singles (RPM) | 4 |
| US Hot Country Songs (Billboard) | 2 |

=== Year-end charts ===
| Chart (1992) | Position |
|---|---|
| Canada Country Tracks (RPM) | 48 |
| US Country Songs (Billboard) | 55 |
