= I'm Gonna Be Somebody =

Single by Travis Tritt

from the album Country Club
- B-side: "The Road Home"
- Released: May 24, 1990
- Recorded: 1989
- Genre: Country
- Length: 4:05
- Label: Warner Bros. Nashville 19797
- Songwriters: Jill Colucci; Stewart Harris
- Producer: Gregg Brown

Travis Tritt singles chronology
"Help Me Hold On" (1990)	"I'm Gonna Be Somebody" (1990)	"Put Some Drive in Your Country" (1990)

"I'm Gonna Be Somebody" is a song written by Jill Colucci and Stewart Harris, and recorded by American country music artist Travis Tritt. It released in May 1990 as the third single from his debut album Country Club. It reached No. 2 in the United States, behind Shenandoah's "Next to You, Next to Me", while it became his second No. 1 hit in Canada.

== Content ==
The song is a moderate up-tempo describing a young man named Bobby, who lives in a lower-class community with rather difficult economical issues. Bobby is an aspiring young singer and musician whose lifelong dream is to have a successful career in the music business; however, people in his community beg to differ and advise Bobby to instead choose a more realistic source of income, as they believe a career in music is not a good option. Bobby quietly ignores their advice and continues his quest to pursue his dreams and prove all of the nonbelievers wrong. A decade passes before Bobby finally achieves those dreams; he is now one of the most successful recording artists (presumably in country music) with a top concert tour and number-one radio singles to his credit. Bobby eventually performs a summer homecoming concert; and during his performance, he happens to hear a singing voice coming from the front row of the audience, which is said to be another young man who has exactly the same dreams and ambitions that Bobby once had long ago.

== Personnel ==
The following musicians play on this track:

- Mike Brignardello – bass guitar
- Larry Byrom – acoustic guitar
- Wendell Cox – electric guitar solo
- Paul Franklin – pedal steel guitar, lap steel guitar
- Jack Holder – electric guitar
- Dana McVicker – background vocals
- Mark O'Connor – fiddle
- Bobby Ogdin – piano, keyboards
- Jim "Jimmy Joe" Ruggierre – harmonica
- Steve Turner – drums, percussion
- Reggie Young – electric guitar

== Chart positions ==
Chart (1990)	Peak position
Canada Country Singles (RPM)	1
US Hot Country Songs (Billboard)	2

=== Year-end charts ===
Chart (1990)	Position
Canada Country Tracks (RPM)	20
US Country Songs (Billboard)	33
