= Sometimes She Forgets =

Single by Travis Tritt

from the album Greatest Hits: From the Beginning
- B-side: "Only You (And You Alone)"
- Released: August 7, 1995
- Recorded: 1995
- Genre: Country
- Length: 3:45 (single version); 4:36 (album version)
- Label: Warner Bros. Nashville 17792
- Songwriter: Steve Earle
- Producer: Gregg Brown

Travis Tritt singles chronology
"Tell Me I Was Dreaming" (1995)	"Sometimes She Forgets" (1995)	"Only You (And You Alone)" (1996)

"Sometimes She Forgets" is a song written by Steve Earle, who recorded it on his 1995 Train a Comin' album.

The highest-charting version of the song was recorded by American country music artist Travis Tritt, and was released in August 1995 as the lead-off single from his compilation album Greatest Hits: From the Beginning. It peaked at number 7 in the United States, and at number 6 in Canada.

== Background ==
In the liner notes from his acoustic album Train a Comin', Earle indicates that he wrote the song in 1979. At that time, he was a staff writer in Nashville, before he had a recording contract. Earle did not record the song on his first four studio albums, but an early version was included on a set of demos, Uncut Gems, in the early 1990s. Earle's management circulated the demos to other artists when Earle's career was threatened by his drug use and he had been dropped from his label. This resulted in Tritt covering the song, as well as recordings of lesser-known versions by Martin Delray (1992) and Stacy Dean Campbell (1995). After getting sober in 1994, Earle recorded the song, as well as some of his other early work, on Train a Comin', released on February 28, 1995.

== Travis Tritt version ==
Tritt has described his version as a departure from his usual style. He told Billboard magazine that he and co-producer Gregg Brown cut the song with a little different flavor. "It's got a different feel from anything you've heard from me in a long time, maybe ever. The way we cut this song reminds me almost of a 'Tequila Sunrise'-type thing", Tritt said, referring to the Eagles song. "It's got a real good rhythm, almost a calypso kind of thing in there."

Deborah Evans Price of Billboard reviewed the song favorably, saying that it has an "intriguing calypso flavor that plays appealingly against the solid country lyric." She went on to say that Tritt's strongest asset is his vocal and he delivers the song with "heartfelt authority".

Tritt's music video was directed by Michael Merriman and features a view of New York City. It peaked at number 1 on CMT's Top 12 Countdown (now CMT's Top 20 Countdown) in 1995.

== Chart positions ==
Tritt's version of "Sometimes She Forgets" debuted at number 63 on the U.S. Billboard Hot Country Singles & Tracks for the week of August 19, 1995. Tritt's version charted in the U.S. and Canada.

Chart (1995)	Peak position
Canada Country Singles (RPM)	6
US Hot Country Songs (Billboard)	7
