= Jill Colucci =

American singer (born 1949)

- Born: 1949 (age 76–77)
- Origin: United States
- Occupations: Songwriter, vocalist
- Instruments: Vocals, guitar
- Years active: 1988-present

Jill Colucci (born 1949) is an American songwriter and vocalist. She initially rose to prominence in 1988, singing the main scores to the film Mystic Pizza. She sang the ABC promo campaigns Something's Happening (the 1987 version with Bill Champlin and the 1989 edition solo) and America's Watching ABC (1990 version only). She also performed "The Funny Things You Do”, the main theme song of America's Funniest Home Videos during the era of Bob Saget. Colucci's prolific credits even extended to Toyota, where she was the original vocalist of the auto maker's "I Love What You Do For Me" campaign in 1989 and she also performed the title theme song of the short-lived NBC-TV series Brand New Life (1989–90). The following year, as she continued to sing for ABC, she sang for The Disney Channel's Celebrate Me Home promotions. She also sang for promotional videos for the Apple II entitled "Apple II Forever" in 1984.

Colucci has also co-written four country music hits: "I'm Gonna Be Somebody" and "Anymore" by Travis Tritt, "No One Else on Earth" by Wynonna Judd, and "He Would Be Sixteen" by Michelle Wright. She also won the Billboard Song of the Year award for Judd's song. In 1993, she released an album called No Regrets, which also included her versions of those four songs and several other tracks that she had written for other artists.

Colucci first entered into the music industry at age five, when she was still with her family singing along to Brenda Lee albums. While acting with her brother, the two of them began to perform, with her singing and her brother playing the accordion. By age seven, Colucci was the winner of the televised talent competition on The Gene Carroll Show.
