= Tell Me I Was Dreaming =

Single by Travis Tritt

from the album Ten Feet Tall and Bulletproof
- Released: April 3, 1995
- Recorded: 1994
- Genre: Country
- Length: 6:27 (album version); 4:53 (single version); 3:45 (radio edit)
- Label: Warner Bros. Nashville
- Songwriters: Travis Tritt, Bruce Ray Brown
- Producer: Gregg Brown

Travis Tritt singles chronology
"Between an Old Memory and Me" (1995)	"Tell Me I Was Dreaming" (1995)	"Sometimes She Forgets" (1995)

"Tell Me I Was Dreaming" is a song co-written and recorded by American country music artist Travis Tritt. It was released in April 1995 as the fourth and final single from his album Ten Feet Tall and Bulletproof. It peaked at number 2 in the United States, and number 3 in Canada. The song was written by Tritt and Bruce Ray Brown.

== Critical reception ==
Deborah Evans Price, of Billboard magazine reviewed the song favorably, saying that the "big ballad combines an impassioned vocal performance with Gregg Brown's nifty production touches." She goes on to call the song "country through and through."

== Chart positions ==
"Tell Me I Was Dreaming" debuted at number 73 on the U.S. Billboard Hot Country Singles & Tracks for the week of April 15, 1995.

Chart (1995)	Peak position
Canada Country Singles (RPM)	3
US Hot Country Songs (Billboard)	2

=== Year-end charts ===
Chart (1995)	Position
Canada Country Tracks (RPM)	36
US Country Songs (Billboard)	14
