= Stewart Harris =

American songwriter (1949–2023)

- Birth name: Stewart Hamill Harris
- Born: February 13, 1949; Birmingham, Alabama, U.S.
- Origin: Nashville, Tennessee, U.S.
- Died: May 4, 2023 (aged 74)
- Genres: Country
- Occupation: Songwriter
- Years active: 1971–2023

Stewart Hamill Harris (February 13, 1949 – May 4, 2023) was an American country music songwriter. Active since the late 1970s, he has had four compositions which have reached number one on the Billboard Hot Country Songs chart.

== Biography and career ==
Harris was born in Birmingham, Alabama, but raised in Aiken, South Carolina, where he performed as a folk music singer. He then moved to New York City and Washington, D.C. before meeting Harry Warner, president of Jerry Reed's publishing company, Vector Music. Through this connection he moved to Nashville, Tennessee, in 1975 and began writing and touring with Reed. Harris also issued one album, Sing Me a Rainbow, on Mercury Records in 1977. Harris also wrote "A Player, a Pawn, a Hero, a King", which was recorded by Tammy Wynette for the 1978 movie Hooper; this song's success led to further success in film and television soundtrack composition, including the theme song for America's Funniest Home Videos.

Stewart's first chart credit as a songwriter was Donna Fargo's 1978 hit "Ragamuffin Man", which reached top 20 on the Billboard Hot Country Songs charts. Three years later, he had his first top-five hit on the same chart with Leon Everette's "Hurricane", followed by the number-one hits "Lonely Nights" by Mickey Gilley in 1982 and "Rose in Paradise" by Waylon Jennings in 1987. Travis Tritt would also record four of Harris's songs: "I'm Gonna Be Somebody", "Drift Off to Dream", "Can I Trust You with My Heart", and "If I Lost You". "Can I Trust You with My Heart" and Wynonna Judd's "No One Else on Earth" both hit number one on Hot Country Songs in 1992. Other artists who had top-ten hits with songs written by Harris include John Berry, Little Texas, Shenandoah, The Oak Ridge Boys, and Tammy Cochran. Harris has received ten "Million-Air" awards from Broadcast Music Incorporated (BMI), honoring songs of his which have received one million spins on radio. He was also nominated by the Academy of Country Music in 2002 for both Single of the Year and Song of the year for Cochran's "Angels in Waiting", and he is a member of the Alabama Music Hall of Fame.

He died on May 4, 2023.
