= Travis Tritt =

American country musician (born 1963)

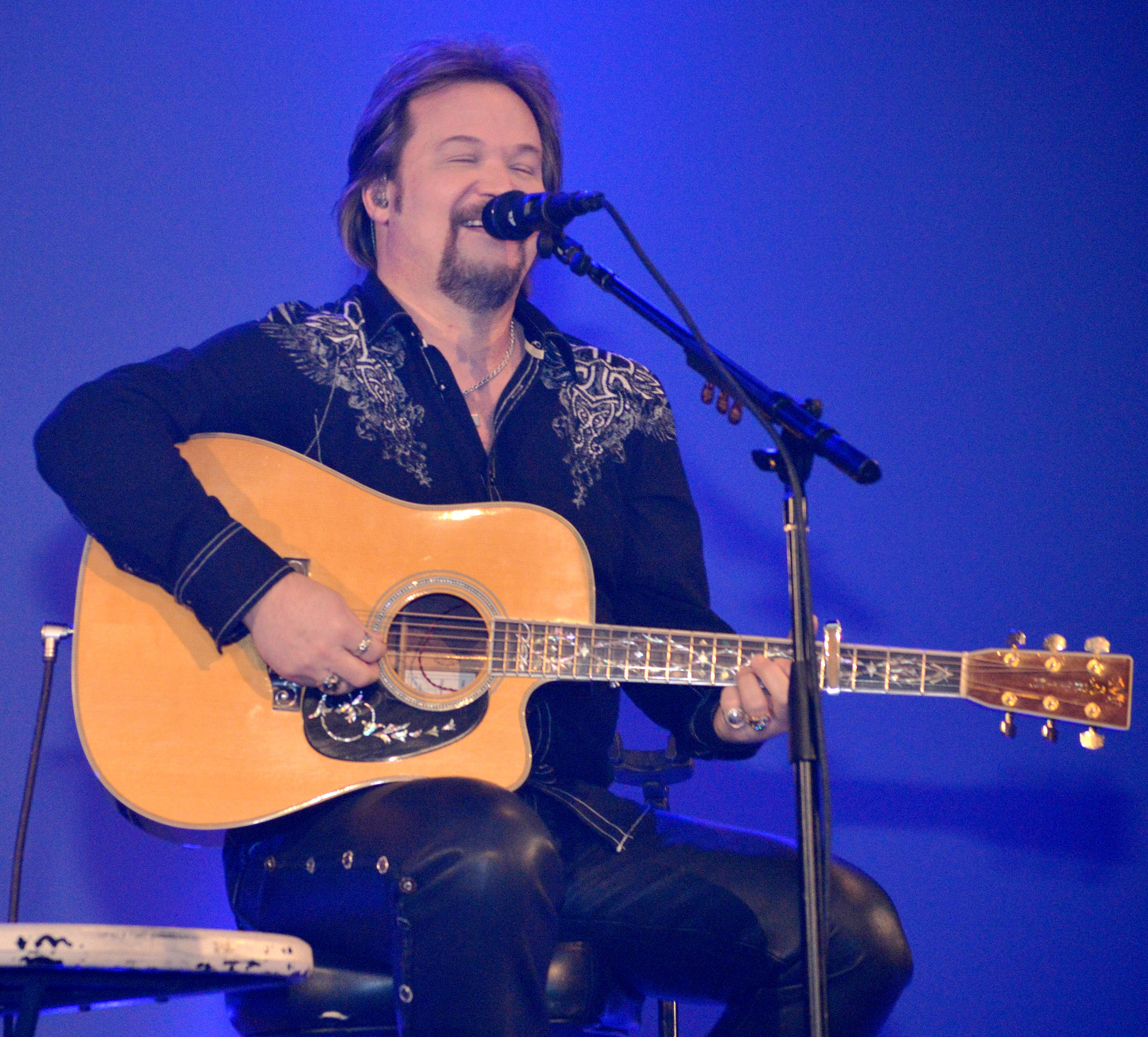
- Tritt performing in 2014

Background information
- Born: James Travis Tritt; February 9, 1963 (age 63); Marietta, Georgia, U.S.
- Genres: Country; outlaw country; southern rock
- Occupations: Singer, songwriter, actor
- Instruments: Vocals, guitar
- Years active: 1987–present
- Labels: Warner Bros.; Columbia; Category 5; Post Oak; Big Noise
- Spouse(s): Karen Ryon (m. 1982; div. 1984) Jodi Barnett (m. 1984; div. 1989) Theresa Nelson (m. 1997)
- Website: travistritt.com

James Travis Tritt (born February 9, 1963) is an American country singer, songwriter, and actor.

Seven of his albums (counting the Greatest Hits) are certified platinum or higher by the Recording Industry Association of America; the highest-certified is 1991's It's All About to Change, which is certified triple-platinum. Tritt has also charted more than forty times on the Hot Country Songs charts, including five number ones—"Help Me Hold On", "Anymore", "Can I Trust You with My Heart", "Foolish Pride", and "Best of Intentions"—and fifteen additional top-ten singles. Tritt's musical style is defined by mainstream country and Southern rock influences.

He has received two Grammy Awards, both for Best Country Collaboration with Vocals, in 1992 for "The Whiskey Ain't Workin'", a duet with Marty Stuart, and again in 1998 for "Same Old Train", a collaboration with Stuart and nine other artists. He has received four awards from the Country Music Association and has been a member of the Grand Ole Opry since 1992.

== Early life ==
James Travis Tritt was born on February 9, 1963, in Marietta, Georgia, to James and Gwen Tritt. He first took interest in singing after his church's Sunday school choir performed "Everything Is Beautiful". He received his first guitar at age eight and taught himself how to play it; in the fourth grade, he performed "Annie's Song" and "King of the Road" for his class and was later invited to play for other classrooms in his school. When he was 14, his parents bought him another guitar, and he learned more songs from his uncle, Sam Lockhart. Later, Tritt joined his church band, which occasionally performed at nearby churches.

Tritt began writing music while he was attending Sprayberry High School; his first song composition, entitled "Spend a Little Time", was written about a girlfriend with whom he had broken up. He performed the song for his friends, one of whom complimented him on his songwriting skills. He also founded a bluegrass group with some of his friends and won second place in a local tournament for playing "Mammas Don't Let Your Babies Grow Up to Be Cowboys".

During his adolescence, Tritt worked at a furniture store and later as a supermarket clerk. He lived with his mother after his father and she divorced; they remarried when he was 18. He worked at an air conditioning company while playing in clubs, but left the air conditioning job at the suggestion of one of his bandmates. Tritt's father thought that he would not find success as a musician, while his mother thought that he should perform Christian music instead of country.

Through the assistance of Warner Bros. Records executive Danny Davenport, Tritt began making demonstration recordings (demos). The two worked together for the next several years, eventually putting together a demo album called Proud of the Country. Davenport sent the demo to Warner Bros. representatives in Los Angeles, who in turn sent it to their Nashville division, which signed Tritt in 1987. Davenport also helped Tritt find a talent manager, Ken Kragen. At first, Kragen was not interested in taking an "entry-level act", but decided to sign on as Tritt's manager after Kragen's wife convinced him.

== Musical career ==
=== 1989–1991: Country Club ===
Tritt's contract with Warner Bros. meant that he was signed to record six songs, and three of them were to be released as singles. According to the contract, he would not be signed on for a full album unless one of the three singles became a hit. His first single was "Country Club". Recorded in late 1988 and released on August 7, 1989, the song spent 26 weeks on the Hot Country Singles and Tracks charts, peaking at number nine. It was the title track to his 1990 debut album Country Club, produced by Gregg Brown. The month of its release, Tritt burst a blood vessel on his vocal cords, and had to take vocal rest for a month. His second single, "Help Me Hold On", became his first number-one single in 1990. The album's third and fifth singles, "I'm Gonna Be Somebody" and "Drift Off to Dream", respectively, peaked at numbers two and three on the Hot Country Singles and Tracks charts, and number one on the Canadian RPM country charts; "I'm Gonna Be Somebody" also went to number one on the U.S. country singles charts published by Radio & Records. "Put Some Drive in Your Country", which was released fourth, peaked at 28 on Hot Country Songs. Country Club was certified platinum by the RIAA in July 1991 for shipments of one million copies, and no medals since in 1996. In 1990, he won the Top New Male Artist award from Billboard. The Country Music Association (CMA) also nominated him for the Horizon Award (now known as the New Artist Award), which is given to new artists who have shown the most significant artistic and commercial development from a first or second album.

Brian Mansfield of AllMusic gave the album a positive review, saying, "Put Some Drive in Your Country" paid homage to Tritt's influences, but that the other singles were more radio-friendly. Giving the album a B-minus, Alanna Nash of Entertainment Weekly compared Tritt's music to that of Hank Williams, Jr. and Joe Stampley.

=== 1991–1992: It's All About to Change ===
In 1991, Tritt received a second Horizon Award nomination, which he won that year. He also released his second album, It's All About to Change. The album went on to become his best-selling one, with a triple-platinum certification from the RIAA for shipments of three million copies. All four of its singles reached the top five on the country music charts. "Here's a Quarter (Call Someone Who Cares)" and the Marty Stuart duet "The Whiskey Ain't Workin'", respectively, the first and third singles, both reached number two, with the number-one "Anymore" in between. "Nothing Short of Dying" was the fourth single, with a peak at number four on Billboard; both "The Whiskey Ain't Working" and it went to number one on Radio and Records. "Bible Belt", another cut from the album (recorded in collaboration with Little Feat), appeared in the 1992 film My Cousin Vinny (the lyrics for the song, however, were changed for the version played in the movie to match the story line). Although not released as a single, it peaked at number 72 country based on unsolicited airplay and was the B-side to "Nothing Short of Dying". "Bible Belt" was inspired by a youth pastor whom Tritt had known in his childhood.

Stuart offered "The Whiskey Ain't Workin' Anymore" to Tritt backstage at the CMA awards show, and they recorded it as a duet through the suggestion of Tritt's record producer, Gregg Brown. The duet won both artists the next year's Grammy Award for Best Country Collaboration with Vocals. Tritt and Stuart charted a second duet, "This One's Gonna Hurt You (For a Long, Long Time)", which went to number seven in mid-1992 and appeared on Stuart's album This One's Gonna Hurt You. This song won the 1992 CMA award for Vocal Event of the Year.

In June 1992, Tritt received media attention when he criticized Billy Ray Cyrus' "Achy Breaky Heart" at a Fan Fair interview, saying that he did not think that Cyrus' song made a "statement". The following January, Cyrus responded at the American Music Awards by referring to Tritt's "Here's a Quarter". Tritt later apologized to Cyrus, but said that he defended his opinion on the song.

=== 1992–1993: T-R-O-U-B-L-E and A Travis Tritt Christmas ===
Tritt and Stuart began their No Hats Tour in 1992. In August of that same year, Tritt released the album T-R-O-U-B-L-E. Its first single was "Lord Have Mercy on the Working Man", a song written by Kostas. This song, which featured backing vocals from Brooks & Dunn, T. Graham Brown, George Jones, Little Texas, Dana McVicker (who also sang backup on Tritt's first two albums), Tanya Tucker, and Porter Wagoner on the final chorus, peaked at number five. Its follow-up, "Can I Trust You with My Heart", became Tritt's third Billboard number one in early 1993. The album's next three singles did not perform as well on the charts: The title track (a cover of an Elvis Presley song), peaked at 13, followed by "Looking Out for Number One" at number 11 and "Worth Every Mile" at number 30. T-R-O-U-B-L-E became the second album of his career to achieve double-platinum certification. Stephen Thomas Erlewine of AllMusic thought that T-R-O-U-B-L-E followed too closely the formula of It's All About to Change, but said that the songs showed Tritt's personality. Nash gave the album a similar criticism, but praised the rock influences of "Looking Out for Number One" and the vocals on "Can I Trust You with My Heart".

One month after the release of T-R-O-U-B-L-E, Tritt issued a Christmas album titled A Travis Tritt Christmas: Loving Time of the Year, for which he wrote the title track. He also joined the Grand Ole Opry, a weekly stage show and radio broadcast specializing in country music performances, and filled in for Garth Brooks at a performance on the American Music Awards. By year's end, Tritt and several other artists appeared on George Jones's "I Don't Need Your Rockin' Chair", which won all artists involved the next year's CMA Vocal Event of the Year award.

=== 1994–1995: Ten Feet Tall and Bulletproof and Greatest Hits ===
In early 1994, after "Worth Every Mile" fell from the charts, Tritt charted at number 21 with a cover of the Eagles' "Take It Easy". He recorded this song for the tribute album Common Thread: The Songs of the Eagles (released through Warner Bros.' Giant Records division), which featured country music artists' renditions of Eagles songs. When filming the music video for this song, Tritt requested that the band, which had been on hiatus for over 13 years, appear in it. This reunion inspired the Eagles' Hell Freezes Over Tour, which began that year.

His fourth album, Ten Feet Tall and Bulletproof, was released that May. Its lead-off single, "Foolish Pride", went to number one, and the fourth single, "Tell Me I Was Dreaming", reached number two. Between these songs were the title track at number 22 and "Between an Old Memory and Me" (originally recorded by Keith Whitley) at number 11. The album included two co-writes with Gary Rossington of Lynyrd Skynyrd, and guest vocals from Waylon Jennings and Hank Williams, Jr. on the cut "Outlaws Like Us". The album achieved platinum certification in December of that year and later became his third double-platinum album. AllMusic reviewer Brian Mansfield said that Tritt was "most comfortable with his Southern rock/outlaw mantle" on it, comparing "Foolish Pride" favorably to "Anymore" and the work of Bob Seger. Alanna Nash praised the title track and "Tell Me I Was Dreaming" in her review for Entertainment Weekly, but thought that the other songs were still too similar in sound to his previous works.

His 1995 album Greatest Hits: From the Beginning included most of his singles to that point, as well as two new cuts - the Steve Earle composition "Sometimes She Forgets" and a cover of the pop standard "Only You (And You Alone)". The former was a hit at number seven, while the latter spent only eight weeks on the country charts and peaked at number 51. Greatest Hits was certified platinum.

=== 1996–1997: The Restless Kind ===
In April 1996, Tritt and Stuart charted a third duet, "Honky Tonkin's What I Do Best", which appeared on Stuart's album of the same name and peaked at 23 on the country charts. The song won both artists that year's CMA award for Vocal Event, Tritt's third win in this category. The two began a second tour, the Double Trouble Tour, that year.

Tritt charted at number three in mid-1996 with "More Than You'll Ever Know", the first single from his fifth album, The Restless Kind. The album accounted for one more top-10 hit, a cover of Waylon Jennings's "Where Corn Don't Grow", which Tritt took to number six in late 1996. This song's chart run overlapped with that of "Here's Your Sign (Get the Picture)", a novelty release combining snippets of comedian Bill Engvall's "Here are Your Sign" routines with a chorus sung by Tritt. "Here's Your Sign (Get the Picture)" peaked at 29 on the country charts and 43 on the Billboard Hot 100, accounting for Tritt's first entry on the latter chart. The other singles from The Restless Kind all failed to make top 10 upon their 1997 release. "She's Going Home with Me" and "Still in Love with You" (previously the respective B-sides to "Where Corn Don't Grow" and "More Than You'll Ever Know") were the third and fifth releases, peaking at 24 and 23 on Hot Country Singles and Tracks. In between was the number-18 "Helping Me Get Over You", a duet with Lari White, which the two co-wrote.

Unlike his previous albums, all of which were produced by Gregg Brown, Tritt produced The Restless Kind with Don Was. Tritt told Billboard that the album showed a greater level of personal involvement than his previous efforts, as it was his first co-production credit. He also noted that he sang most of the vocal harmony by himself, played guitar on "She's Going Home with Me", and helped with the album's art direction. It received positive reviews from Thom Owens of AllMusic, who said that it was the most country-sounding album of his career. Don Yates of Country Standard Time also praised it for having a more "organic" sound than Tritt's other albums.

=== 1998–1999: No More Looking over My Shoulder ===
In 1998, several other artists and he contributed to Stuart's "Same Old Train", a cut from the collaborative album Tribute to Tradition; this song charted at number 59 on Hot Country Songs and won Tritt his second Grammy for Best Country Collaboration with Vocals. He also performed on Frank Wildhorn's concept album of the musical The Civil War, singing the song "The Day the Sun Stood Still". By year's end, Tritt also released his final Warner Bros. album, No More Looking over My Shoulder. It was his first of four consecutive albums he produced with Billy Joe Walker, Jr., who is a session guitarist, producer, and New Age musician. The album was led off by the ballad "If I Lost You", which peaked at number 29 on the country charts and number 86 on the Hot 100. Michael Peterson (who recorded for Warner Bros.' Reprise label at the time) co-wrote and sang backing vocals on the title track, which went to number 38 country in early 1999. The album's third and final single was a cover of Jude Cole's "Start the Car" (previously the B-side to "If I Lost You"), which peaked at number 52.

Late in 1999, Tritt recorded a cover of Hank Williams's "Move It on Over" with George Thorogood for the soundtrack to the cartoon King of the Hill. This cut peaked at number 66 on the country charts from unsolicited airplay.

=== 2000–2002: Down the Road I Go ===
Soon after leaving Warner Bros. Records, Tritt signed to Columbia Records and released the album Down the Road I Go in 2000. The album's first release was "Best of Intentions", his fifth and final number-one hit on Billboard. It was also his most successful entry on the Hot 100, where it reached number 27. The next two singles, "It's a Great Day to Be Alive" and "Love of a Woman", both peaked at number two on the country charts in 2001, followed by "Modern Day Bonnie and Clyde" at number eight. All three songs also crossed over to the Hot 100, respectively reaching peaks of 33, 39, and 55. Tritt wrote or co-wrote seven of the album's songs, including "Best of Intentions", and collaborated with Charlie Daniels on two of them. "It's a Great Day to Be Alive" was originally recorded by Jon Randall, whose version was to have been included on an unreleased album for BNA Records in the late 1990s.

Maria Konicki Dinoia gave the album a positive review on AllMusic, saying that Tritt "hasn't lost his touch". Country Standard Time also gave a positive review, saying that it showed Tritt's balance of country and rock influences. An uncredited review in Billboard magazine called "Best of Intentions" a "gorgeous ballad", comparing it favorably to his early Warner Bros. releases.

=== 2002–2005: Strong Enough and My Honky Tonk History ===
In September 2002, Tritt released his second album on Columbia Records, Strong Enough. Its first single was "Strong Enough to Be Your Man" (an answer song to Sheryl Crow's 1994 single "Strong Enough") which reached number 13. The only other release was "Country Ain't Country", which peaked at 26 on the country charts. William Ruhlmann gave the album a generally positive review on AllMusic, saying that he considered its sound closer to mainstream country than Tritt's previous albums.

Also in 2002, Tritt performed on an episode of Crossroads, a program on Country Music Television, which pairs country acts with musicians from other genres for collaborative performances. He performed with Ray Charles. Tritt contributed guest vocals to Charlie Daniels' 2003 single "Southern Boy", and recorded a cover of Waylon Jennings' "Lonesome, On'ry and Mean" to the RCA Records tribute album I've Always Been Crazy. Respectively, these songs reached 51 and 50 on the country charts.

Tritt's 10th studio album, My Honky Tonk History, was released in 2004. This album included three charting singles: "The Girl's Gone Wild" at 28, followed by the John Mellencamp duet "What Say You" at number 21 and "I See Me" at number 32. Other songs on the album included a cover of Philip Claypool's "Circus Leaving Town" and songs written by Gretchen Wilson, Benmont Tench, and Delbert McClinton. Thom Jurek rated this album favorably, saying that it was a "solid, sure-voiced outing"; he also thought that "What Say You" was the best song on it.

=== 2007–present: The Storm, The Calm After... and Set in Stone ===
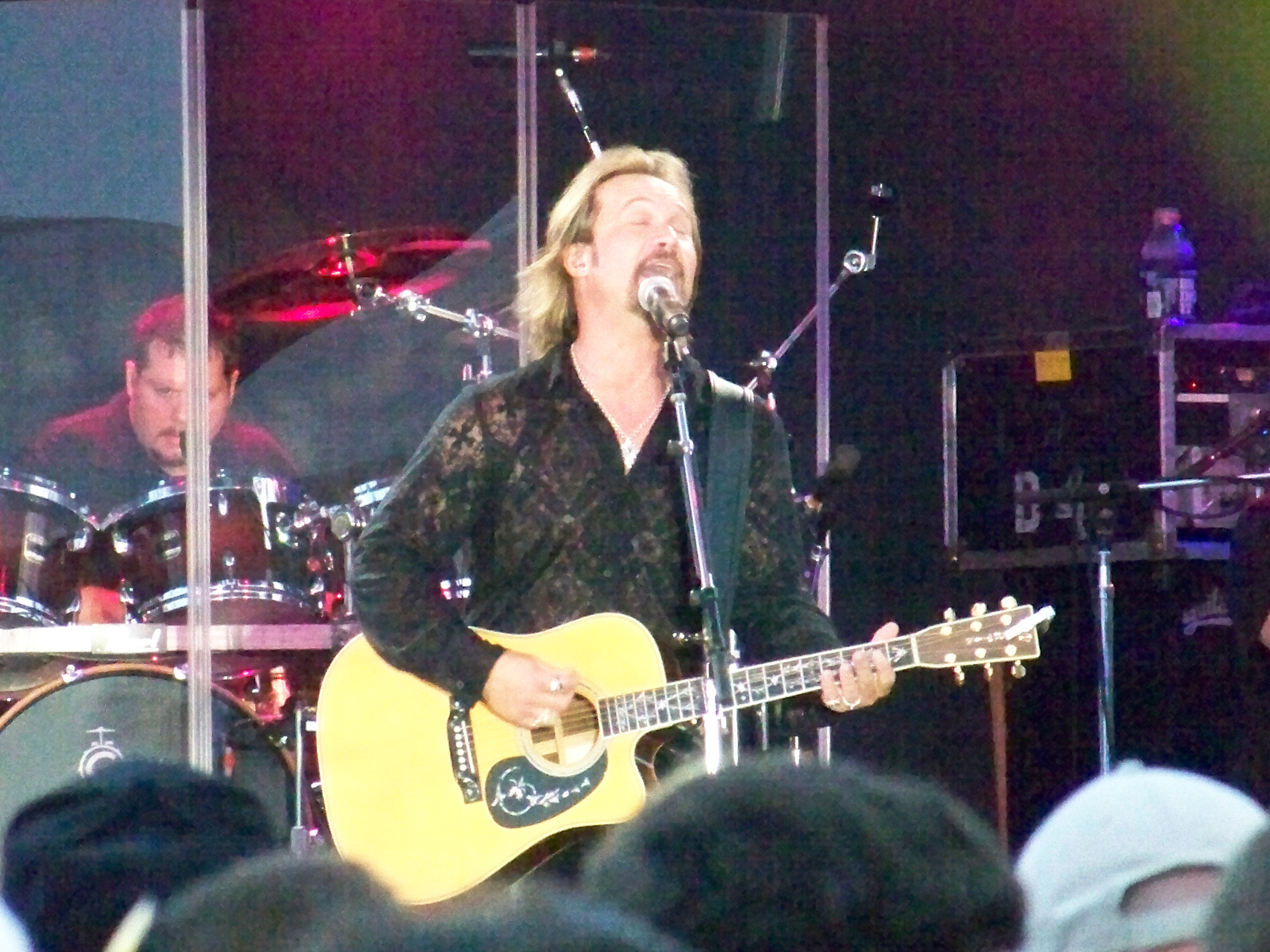
Tritt performing in 2009

Tritt exited Columbia in July 2005, citing creative differences over My Honky Tonk History. He signed to the independent Category 5 Records in February 2006, and served as the label's flagship artist. In March 2007, a concert promoter in the Pittsburgh area sued Tritt, claiming he had committed to play a show, but then backed out and signed to play a competing venue. Tritt's manager denied he had ever signed a contract with the promoter. Tritt released his first single for Category 5 in May 2007: a cover of the Richard Marx song "You Never Take Me Dancing". It was included on his only album for Category 5, The Storm, which American Idol judge Randy Jackson produced. The album featured a more rhythm and blues influence than Tritt's previous works. "You Never Take Me Dancing" peaked at number 27 on the country charts; a second single, "Something Stronger Than Me", was released in October, but it did not chart. Category 5 closed in November 2007 after allegations that the label's chief executive officer, Raymond Termini, had illegally used Medicaid funds to finance it. A month later, Tritt filed a $10 million lawsuit against Category 5, because the label had failed to pay royalties on the album, and failed to give him creative control on The Storm.

In October 2008, Tritt began an 11-date tour with Marty Stuart, on which they performed acoustic renditions of their duets; Tritt also performed five solo shows. Tritt signed a management deal with Parallel Entertainment in December 2010. He continued to tour through to 2012 and into 2013, with most of his shows being solo acoustic performances. Tritt acquired the rights to the songs on The Storm and reissued it via his own Post Oak label in July 2013 under the title The Calm After... The re-release included two covers - the Patty Smyth and Don Henley duet "Sometimes Love Just Ain't Enough", which he recorded as a duet with his daughter Tyler Reese, and Faces' 1971 hit "Stay with Me".

In 2019, Tritt was featured on the country rock hit "Outlaws & Outsiders" by Cory Marks. Set in Stone was released in 2021 in two formats - standard and acoustic; recorded around that time in 2019 and 2020, the album was pushed back in early 2021. In 2024, Tritt featured on another Cory Marks song titled "(Make My) Country Rock".

== Acting career ==
Tritt's first acting role was alongside fellow country singer Kenny Rogers in the 1993 made-for-television movie Rio Diablo. In 1994, Tritt made a special appearance as a bull rider in the movie The Cowboy Way, which starred Woody Harrelson, Kiefer Sutherland, and Dylan McDermott. In 1995, he appeared in season six of the horror anthology series Tales from the Crypt in the episode called "Doctor of Horror". He also starred in various guest roles on Yes, Dear as a rehabilitating criminal, on Diagnosis Murder as a terminally ill criminal taunting Steve Sloan (Barry Van Dyke), and on Dr. Quinn, Medicine Woman as a gun slinger. The following year, Tritt appeared as himself in Sgt. Bilko, which starred Steve Martin, Dan Aykroyd, and Phil Hartman; Tritt's cover of "Only You (And You Alone)" appeared in the film's soundtrack. He also appeared as himself in the 1997 film Fire Down Below, starring Steven Seagal and Kris Kristofferson. In 1999, Tritt appeared in Outlaw Justice with Willie Nelson, Waylon Jennings, and Kris Kristofferson. Tritt appeared in the film Blues Brothers 2000 as one of the Louisiana Gator Boys, performing alongside B. B. King, Eric Clapton, and Bo Diddley. In 2001, he guest-starred in Elmo's World the Wild Wild West. In September 2010, filming began on a movie called Fishers of Men, a Christian film.

== Musical styles ==
Although he had been singing since childhood, Tritt said that he began to put "a little more soul" in his voice after his church band performed at an African-American church. He said that he took interest in how African-American singers put "all these bends and sweeps and curls" in their voices, and began emulating that sound. While performing at these churches, he also took interest in gospel singers such as Andraé Crouch. Later on, he began listening to Southern rock acts such as Lynyrd Skynyrd through the recommendation of a friend, as well as the bluegrass music to which his uncle exposed him. Tritt said that he found his songwriting began to develop during the creation of his demonstration tape, when he had written a song called "Gambler's Blues" that "felt a lot more connected to Southern rock" than his previous writings. He cites country, rock, and folk as his influences. Stephen Thomas Erlewine contrasts him with contemporaries Clint Black and Alan Jackson, saying that Tritt was "the only one not to wear a [cowboy] hat and the only one to dip into bluesy Southern rock. Consequently, he developed a gutsy, outlaw image that distinguished him from the pack." Zell Miller, in the book They Heard Georgia Singing, said that Tritt has an "unerring ability to walk the narrow path between his country heritage and his rock leanings to the acclaim of the devotees of both."

Regarding his songwriting style and single choices, Tritt said that he writes "strictly from personal experiences" and does not follow a particular formula. He described "Here's a Quarter" as "one of the simplest three-chord waltzes I've ever written", and said that label executives were reluctant to release it because they thought that it was a novelty song. Also, he was told that "I'm Gonna Be Somebody" would not be a hit because it did not contain any rhymes, and fought the release of the song "Country Club" because he did not think that it fit his style. He also said that despite their low peaks, the more rock-influenced "Put Some Drive in Your Country" and "T-R-O-U-B-L-E" helped generate sales for their respective albums more so than the top-10 hits from those albums.

== Personal life ==
Tritt married his high school sweetheart, Karen Ryon, in September 1982. They were married two years before divorcing. After going to court, Tritt was ordered to pay alimony to Karen for six months. When he was 21, he married Jodi Barnett, who was 33 at the time. He divorced her shortly after signing with Warner Bros. in 1989; the divorce was finalized one month before "Country Club" was released. Tritt wrote the song "Here's a Quarter" the night he received his divorce papers.

He married Theresa Nelson on April 12, 1997. They have one daughter, and two sons.

Tritt is a lifelong fan of the Atlanta Falcons. During the early 1990s, he became friends with Jerry Glanville, who would invite him to games whenever he was in town during Glanville's tenure; Tritt was seen on the sideline for multiple games during the 1991 season.

On May 18, 2019, he was in his tour bus when it was involved in a motor vehicle accident that took the lives of two people driving the wrong way on Veteran's Highway leaving Myrtle Beach, South Carolina.

=== Political views and advocacy ===
Tritt is a member of the Republican Party and supported George W. Bush for president in 2000. The two met in 1996 at the Republican National Convention in San Diego, California, where Tritt sang the national anthem.

In September 2020, Tritt gained notoriety for joining fellow Republican James Woods in blocking random Twitter users for using pro-Black Lives Matter and other anti-Trump tags in their posts, under the belief that it would counteract anti-Republican sentiment on Twitter.

In April 2023, as a protest against Bud Light for supporting transgender influencer Dylan Mulvaney, Tritt tweeted, "I will be deleting all Anheuser-Busch products from my tour hospitality rider."

=== Alleged paranormal encounters ===
In October 2015, Tritt appeared on Lifetime Network's The Haunting of... program to discuss his experiences with the paranormal. Tritt stated that beginning in 1993, he was awakened "regularly" by disembodied voices in a vacation cabin that he owned – the voices spoke in an unknown dialect. His wife, Theresa, eventually heard them, as well. According to Tritt, "Over the years, these voices started happening on such a frequent basis that we were afraid to come up here." He also asserted that footprints once appeared in the carpet of the cabin, and imprints in the bedspread, that belonged to neither his wife nor him.

The show's host, Kim Russo, concluded that an African-American medicine man had been stabbed and beaten to death on the property, and the voices that Tritt was hearing belonged to the murderers' angry spirits. A title card in the program notes, "On August 14, 1875, a group of men killed a 'hoodoo doctor' close to the land where Travis's cabin was built." Russo believed that the hoodoo doctor's spirit also lingered on the property because it found a "kindred spirit" in Tritt.

== Discography ==
Studio albums

- Proud of the Country (1987)
- Country Club (1990)
- It's All About to Change (1991)
- T-R-O-U-B-L-E (1992)
- Ten Feet Tall and Bulletproof (1994)
- The Restless Kind (1996)
- No More Looking over My Shoulder (1998)
- Down the Road I Go (2000)
- Strong Enough (2002)
- My Honky Tonk History (2004)
- The Storm (2007)
- The Calm After... (2013)
- Set in Stone (2021)
- Country Chapel (2023)

Billboard number-one singles

- "Help Me Hold On" (1990)
- "Anymore" (1991)
- "Can I Trust You with My Heart" (1992 – 1993)
- "Foolish Pride" (1994)
- "Best of Intentions" (2000)

== Awards and nominations ==
=== Grammy Awards ===
Year	Nominee / work	Award	Result
1992	"Here's a Quarter (Call Someone Who Cares)"	Best Male Country Vocal Performance	Nominated
1992	"Here's a Quarter (Call Someone Who Cares)"	Best Country Song	Nominated
1993	"Lord Have Mercy on the Working Man"	Best Male Country Vocal Performance	Nominated
1993	"The Whiskey Ain't Workin'"^{[A]}	Best Country Collaboration with Vocals	Won
1995	"The Devil Comes Back to Georgia"^{[B]}	Best Country Collaboration with Vocals	Nominated
1997	"Honky Tonkin's What I Do Best"^{[A]}	Best Country Collaboration with Vocals	Nominated
1997	Hope: Country Music's Quest for a Cure	Best Country Collaboration with Vocals	Nominated
1999	"Same Old Train"^{[C]}	Best Country Collaboration with Vocals	Won

=== American Music Awards ===
Year	Nominee / work	Award	Result
1991	Travis Tritt	Favorite Country New Artist	Nominated
1992	It's All About to Change	Favorite Country Album	Nominated
1992	"Here's a Quarter (Call Someone Who Cares)"	Favorite Country Single	Nominated
2002	Travis Tritt	Favorite Country Male Artist	Nominated

=== TNN/Music City News Country Awards ===
Year	Nominee / work	Award	Result
1991	Travis Tritt	Star of Tomorrow	Nominated
1992	Travis Tritt	Star of Tomorrow	Won
1992	Travis Tritt and Marty Stuart	Vocal Collaboration of the Year	Nominated
1992	"Here's a Quarter (Call Someone Who Cares)"	Single of the Year	Nominated
1992	"Anymore"	Video of the Year	Nominated
1993	Travis Tritt and Marty Stuart	Vocal Collaboration of the Year	Won
1993	George Jones and Friends^{[D]}	Vocal Collaboration of the Year	Nominated
1994	Common Thread: The Songs of the Eagles	Album of the Year	Nominated
1996	"Tell Me I Was Dreaming"	Video of the Year	Nominated
1997	Travis Tritt and Marty Stuart	Vocal Collaboration of the Year	Nominated
1998	Travis Tritt and Lari White	Vocal Collaboration of the Year	Nominated

=== Academy of Country Music Awards ===
Year	Nominee / work	Award	Result
1991	Travis Tritt	Top New Male Vocalist	Nominated
1992	"Here's a Quarter (Call Someone Who Cares)"	Single Record of the Year	Nominated
1992	"Here's a Quarter (Call Someone Who Cares)"	Song of the Year	Nominated
1992	It's All About to Change	Album of the Year	Nominated
1992	"Anymore"	Video of the Year	Nominated
1992	Travis Tritt and Marty Stuart	Top Vocal Duo of the Year	Nominated
1993	Travis Tritt and Marty Stuart	Top Vocal Duo of the Year	Nominated
1993	"Lord Have Mercy on the Working Man"	Video of the Year	Nominated
1993	Travis Tritt	Entertainer of the Year	Nominated
1994	Travis Tritt	Entertainer of the Year	Nominated
1994	"Can I Trust You with My Heart"	Song of the Year	Nominated
1994	Common Thread: The Songs of the Eagles	Album of the Year	Nominated
1996	"Tell Me I Was Dreaming"	Video of the Year	Nominated
1997	"More Than You'll Ever Know"	Video of the Year	Nominated
1997	Travis Tritt and Marty Stuart	Top Vocal Duo of the Year	Nominated
1999	"Same Old Train"^{[C]}	Top Vocal Event of the Year	Nominated
2002	Travis Tritt	Top Male Vocalist of the Year	Nominated
2002	"It's a Great Day to Be Alive"	Single Record of the Year	Nominated
2002	Down the Road I Go	Album of the Year	Nominated
2002	"Out of Control Raging Fire"^{[E]}	Vocal Event of the Year	Nominated

=== Country Music Association Awards ===
Year	Nominee / work	Award	Result
1990	Travis Tritt	Horizon Award	Nominated
1991	Travis Tritt	Horizon Award	Won
1991	"Here's a Quarter (Call Someone Who Cares)"	Single of the Year	Nominated
1992	"Here's a Quarter (Call Someone Who Cares)"	Song of the Year	Nominated
1992	"Anymore"	Video of the Year	Nominated
1992	"This One's Gonna Hurt You (For a Long, Long Time)"^{[A]}	Vocal Event of the Year	Won
1992	Travis Tritt	Male Vocalist of the Year	Nominated
1992	Travis Tritt	Entertainer of the Year	Nominated
1993	"I Don't Need Your Rockin' Chair"^{[F]}	Vocal Event of the Year	Nominated
1994	"The Devil Comes Back to Georgia"^{[B]}	Vocal Event of the Year	Nominated
1994	Common Thread: The Songs of the Eagles	Album of the Year	Won
1994	Rhythm, Country and Blues	Album of the Year	Nominated
1996	"Honky Tonkin's What I Do Best"^{[A]}	Vocal Event of the Year	Nominated
1999	"Same Old Train"^{[C]}	Vocal Event of the Year	Nominated
2002	"Modern Day Bonnie and Clyde"	Video of the Year	Nominated

^[A]Nominated alongside Marty Stuart
^[B]Nominated alongside Marty Stuart, Mark O'Connor, Charlie Daniels and Johnny Cash
^[C]Nominated alongside Clint Black, Joe Diffie, Merle Haggard, Emmylou Harris, Alison Krauss, Patty Loveless, Earl Scruggs, Ricky Skaggs, Marty Stuart, Pam Tillis, Randy Travis and Dwight Yoakam
^[D]George Jones' "Friends" also includes: Vince Gill, Mark Chesnutt, Garth Brooks, Joe Diffie, Alan Jackson, Pam Tillis, T. Graham Brown, Patty Loveless and Clint Black
^[E]Nominated alongside Patty Loveless
^[F]Nominated alongside George Jones and Friends

== Filmography ==
Year	Title	Role	Notes
1990	Hee Haw	Himself	One episode: "Episode No. 22.12"
1993	Rio Diablo	Benjamin Taber	TV movie
1994	The Cowboy Way	Himself	
1994	Following Her Heart	Himself	TV movie
1995	Tales from the Crypt	Charlie	One episode: "Doctor of Horror"
1995	The Jeff Foxworthy Show	Himself	One episode: "He's Making a List, Checking It Twice"
1996	Sgt. Bilko	Himself	
1996	Dr. Quinn, Medicine Woman	Zachary Brett	One episode: "Tin Star"
1996	A Holiday for Love	Sheriff Tom Uhl	TV movie
1997	Fire Down Below	Himself	
1998	Blues Brothers 2000	Himself	
1999	The Long Kill	Sheriff Dalton	TV movie
1999	Diagnosis Murder	Kurt Fallon	One episode: "Down Among the Dead Men"
1999	Touched by an Angel	Dan McConnell	One episode: "Hearts"
1999	Arliss	"Cooter" McCoy	One episode: "The Cult of Celebrity"
2001	Elmo's World	Himself	One special: "Wild Wild West"
2002	CMT Crossroads	Himself	Performed with Ray Charles
2003	King of the Hill	Walt (voice)	One episode: "Livin' on Reds, Vitamin C and Propane"
2004	Yes, Dear	Hank	One episode: "Greg and Jimmy's Criminals"
2004	Higglytown Heroes	Farmer Hero	One episode: "Halloween Heroes"
2004	Celebrity Poker Showdown	Himself	Two episodes; 2004–2005 "Tournament 2, Game 1" "Tournament 5, Game 5"
2005	2001 Maniacs	Gas station attendant	
2005	Blue Collar TV	Himself	One episode: "Dating"
2008	Battleground Earth	Himself	One episode: "Fast Fuel"
2008	The Girls Next Door	Himself	One episode: "Kentucky Fried"
2011	Fishers of Men	Eddie Waters	post-production
2017	Let There Be Light	Dr. Corey	
2018	Forever My Girl	Walt	

== See also ==
- Travis (chimpanzee), named after Tritt
