= Dana McVicker =

American singer-songwriter

- Born: 1963 (age 62–63); Baltimore, Maryland, U.S.
- Origin: Nashville, Tennessee, U.S.
- Genres: Country
- Occupation: Singer
- Instrument: Vocals
- Years active: 1988–1993; 2011–present
- Label: Capitol Nashville
- Website: www.danamcvicker.com

Dana McVicker is an American country music artist. Born in Baltimore, Maryland, in 1963, she recorded for Capitol Records Nashville in 1988, releasing a self-titled album and charting four singles on the U.S. country charts. McVicker was also nominated for Best New Female Artist at the 1988 Academy of Country Music awards, losing to K. T. Oslin. She also appeared on the song "Young Country" from Hank Williams, Jr.'s Born to Boogie album.

After exiting Capitol, McVicker sang backing vocals on Travis Tritt's first five studio albums (counting his Christmas album), and was one of several guest vocalists on his 1992 single "Lord Have Mercy on the Working Man". She was also featured on the track "Drive Away" on Sawyer Brown's 1993 album Outskirts of Town.

McVicker's husband, Michael Thomas, played guitar for Reba McEntire's road band until an airplane, carrying Thomas, six other members of McEntire's band, and her road manager, crashed into a nearby mountain after taking off from an airport in San Diego, California, killing all on board.

== Discography ==
=== Albums ===
Title	Album details
Dana McVicker	Release date: 1988; Label: Capitol Nashville
Back	Release date: 2011; Label: Matchbook Records

=== Singles ===
Year	Single	Peak positions	Album
Year	Single	US Country	Album
1987	"I'd Rather Be Crazy"	64	—N/a
1987	"Call Me a Fool"	64	Dana McVicker
1988	"Rock-a-Bye Heart"	65	Dana McVicker
1988	"I'm Loving the Wrong Man Again"	88	Dana McVicker

=== Music videos ===
Year	Video	Director
1988	"I'm Loving the Wrong Man Again"	M.B. Kleber
