= Lisa Brokop discography =

- Studio albums: 10
- Soundtrack albums: 1
- Singles: 43
- Music videos: 22

The discography for Canadian country singer Lisa Brokop include 10 studio albums, one soundtrack album, and 43 singles. In 1991, Brokop issued her debut album, My Love, on the independent label Libre Records in Canada.

It was in 1994, Brokop signed with Patriot Records, a label owned by Liberty Records and released her second album Every Little Girl's Dream in both Canada and the United States. The album was certified Gold by the CRIA, for sales of 50,000 copies, in October 1995. Lisa Brokop followed in 1996 on Capitol Nashville, the album's commercial failure in both Canada and U.S. forced Brokop and Capitol to part ways.

In 1998, Brokop signed with Columbia Records and released the Canadian only release, When You Get to Be You. The album was scheduled for release in the United States, but due to all singles failing at radio, the album was never released. Undeniable, was issued in 2000 on the independent Cosmo Records label.

Five years after the release of her previous album, Brokop returned with Hey, Do You Know Me released in 2005 on Curb Records in Canada. Brokop's most recent album, Who's Gonna Fill Their Heels, was issued in 2023.

== Studio albums ==
=== 1990s ===
Title	Details	Peak positions		Certifications
Title	Details	CAN Country	US Country	Certifications
My Love	Release date: 1991; Label: Libre Records; Formats: CD, cassette	—	—	
Every Little Girl's Dream	Release date: September 6, 1994; Label: Patriot Records; Formats: CD, cassette	—	—	CAN: Gold
Lisa Brokop	Release date: February 20, 1996; Label: Capitol Nashville; Formats: CD, cassette	18	74	
When You Get to Be You	Release date: July 21, 1998; Label: Columbia Records; Formats: CD, cassette	21	—	
"—" denotes releases that did not chart

=== 2000s–2020s ===
Title	Details
Undeniable	Release date: 2000; Label: Cosmo Records; Formats: CD, cassette
Hey, Do You Know Me	Release date: January 11, 2005; Label: Asylum-Curb Records; Formats: CD, digital download
Beautiful Tragedy	Release date: August 19, 2008; Label: Ellbea Music; Formats: CD, digital download
The Jeffersons, Vol. 1 (with Paul Jefferson)	Release date: June 7, 2011; Label: Royalty Records; Formats: CD, digital download
The Patsy Cline Project	Release date: August 1, 2015; Label: Ellbea Music; Formats: CD, digital download
Who's Gonna Fill Their Heels	Release date: September 15, 2023; Label: BFD/Audium Nashville; Formats: CD, digital download

== Soundtrack albums ==
Title	Details
Harmony Cats	Release date: 1993; Label: A&M Records; Formats: CD, cassette

== Singles ==
=== As lead artist ===
==== 1990s ====
Year	Single	Peak positions		Album
Year	Single	CAN Country	US Country	Album
1990	"Daddy, Sing to Me"	10	—	My Love
1991	"Old Mister Moon"	34	—	My Love
1992	"Time to Come Back Home"	40	—	My Love
1992	"My Love"	34	—	My Love
1993	"Country Girl"	16	—	Harmony Cats (soundtrack)
1994	"Stand by Your Man"	88	—	Harmony Cats (soundtrack)
1994	"Give Me a Ring Sometime"	12	52	Every Little Girl's Dream
1994	"Take That"	34	52	Every Little Girl's Dream
1995	"One of Those Nights"	31	64	Every Little Girl's Dream
1995	"Who Needs You"	58	60	Every Little Girl's Dream
1995	"She Can't Save Him"	63	55	Lisa Brokop
1996	"Before He Kissed Me"	82	63	Lisa Brokop
1996	"West of Crazy"	—	—	Lisa Brokop
1998	"How Do I Let Go"	19	59	When You Get to Be You
1998	"What's Not to Love"	20	—	When You Get to Be You
1998	"When You Get to Be You"	57	64	When You Get to Be You
1999	"Ain't Enough Roses"	—	65	When You Get to Be You
1999	"Better Off Broken"	8	—	When You Get to Be You
1999	"Cool Summer Night"	53	—	When You Get to Be You
"—" denotes releases that did not chart

==== 2000s–2020s ====
Year	Single	Peak positions	Album
Year	Single	CAN Country (Note: Chart positions from RPM Country Tracks in 2000, Radio & Records from 2004 to 2005, and Billboard Canada Country from 2008 to present.)	Album
2000	"Something Undeniable"	18 (Note: "Something Undeniable" reached number 18 when RPM ceased publication in November 2000.)	Undeniable
2001	"Keep Mom and Dad in Love" (with Hal Ketchum)	×	Undeniable
2001	"I'd Like to See You Try"	×	Undeniable
2001	"Say"	×	Undeniable
2002	"Whiskey and Wine"	×	Undeniable
2004	"Wildflower"	14	Hey, Do You Know Me
2004	"Hey, Do You Know Me"	14	Hey, Do You Know Me
2005	"Ladylike"	—	Hey, Do You Know Me
2005	"Big Picture"	10	Non-album single
2008	"Break It"	20	Beautiful Tragedy
2008	"November Trees"	—	Beautiful Tragedy
2009	"Shackin' Up"	—	Beautiful Tragedy
2009	"Just Another Song (You Won't Hear on the Radio)"	—	Beautiful Tragedy
2010	"Find the Sun"	—	The Jeffersons, Vol. 1 (with Paul Jefferson)
2011	"Crazy On Me"	—	The Jeffersons, Vol. 1 (with Paul Jefferson)
2011	"One Headlight"	—	The Jeffersons, Vol. 1 (with Paul Jefferson)
2013	"Let It Burn"	36	Non-album singles
2014	"Love Me If You Can"	42	Non-album singles
2020	"Rockin' Guitars & Cadillac Cars"	—	Non-album singles
2021	"Is It Me and You"	—	Non-album singles
2022	"Trust in Jesus"	—	Non-album singles
"—" denotes releases that did not chart "×" indicates that no relevant chart existed or was archived

=== As featured artist ===
Year	Single	Peak positions	Album
Year	Single	CAN Country	Album
1994	"Light in My Life" (The Johner Brothers with Lisa Brokop)	16	My Brother and Me
1997	"Two Names on an Overpass" (Duane Steele with Lisa Brokop)	21	P.O. Box 423
2005	"God Save the World" (Jeff Carson with Lisa Brokop)	—	Best of America, Vol. 2
"—" denotes releases that did not chart

== Music videos ==
Year	Video	Director
1992	"Time to Come Back Home"	Evan Fitzer
1992	"My Love"	
1994	"Give Me a Ring Sometime"	Thom Oliphant
1994	"Take That"	Thom Oliphant
1995	"One of Those Nights"	Thom Oliphant
1995	"Who Needs You"	Jim Shea
1995	"She Can't Save Him"	Michael Merriman
1996	"West of Crazy"	Michael Merriman
1997	"Two Names on an Overpass" (with Duane Steele)	
1998	"How Do I Let Go"	
2001	"Keep Mom and Dad in Love" (with Hal Ketchum)	Robert Cuffley
2001	"I'd Like to See You Try"	Robert Cuffley
2001	"Say"	Robert Cuffley
2002	"Whiskey and Wine"	
2004	"Wildflower"	Stephano Barberis
2004	"Hey, Do You Know Me"	Stephano Barberis
2005	"Ladylike"	
2005	"Big Picture"	
2008	"Break It"	Stephano Barberis
2008	"November Trees"	Stephano Barberis
2011	"One Headlight" (The Jeffersons)	Julian Chojnacki
2013	"Let It Burn"	Evan Brace
