= Set List (Duane Steele album) =

Greatest hits album by Duane Steele
- Released: June 1, 2004
- Genre: Country
- Length: 1:09:09
- Label: Jolt/Royalty
- Producer: Louis Sedmak

Duane Steele chronology
| I'll Be Alright (2000) | Set List (2004) | Ghost Town (2006) |

Set List is a greatest hits album by Canadian country music artist Duane Steele. It was released by Jolt/Royalty Records on June 1, 2004. Singles released from the album include "Better Man," "Nobody Cheated, Nobody Lied" and "Sad Country Song."

== Track listing ==
1. "Nobody Cheated, Nobody Lied" – 3:05
2. "Sad Country Song" – 3:52
3. "Better Man" – 4:10
4. "The Heart of the It Don't Matter" – 3:09
5. "I-65" – 3:43
6. "This Is Love" – 3:02
7. "The Goodside of Your Goodbye" – 3:20
8. "I'll Be Alright" – 4:10
9. "Make Me Crazy" – 2:47
10. "Right from the Start" – 3:24
11. "If I Could Just Get to You" – 2:50
12. "If You Could Read My Mind" – 4:01
13. "Little Black Dress" – 3:21
14. "Leavin' Made Easy" – 3:35
15. "Tell the Girl" – 2:34
16. "She's Tough" – 3:33
17. "Two Names on an Overpass" – 3:29
  - duet with Lisa Brokop
18. "The Trouble with Love" – 3:37
19. "Anita Got Married" – 3:27
20. "Stuck on Your Love" – 3:30
