= 37th Academy of Country Music Awards =

US music awards ceremony in 2002

- Date: May 22, 2002
- Location: Universal Amphitheatre, Los Angeles, California
- Hosted by: Reba McEntire

Highlights
- Most wins: Brooks & Dunn; Alan Jackson (3)
- Most nominations: Brooks & Dunn; Toby Keith (5 each)

Television/radio coverage
- Network: CBS

The 37th Academy of Country Music Awards were held on May 22, 2002 at for the first time was held at the Universal Amphitheatre, in Los Angeles, California . The ceremony was hosted by ACM Award winner, Reba McEntire. This would be the final ceremony to be held at the Universal Amphitheatre.

== Winners and nominees ==
Winners are shown in bold.

Entertainer of the Year	Album of the Year
**Brooks & Dunn**; Garth Brooks; Alan Jackson; Toby Keith; Tim McGraw	**O Brother, Where Art Thou?** — **Soundtrack**; Down the Road I Go — Travis Tritt; Pull My Chain — Toby Keith; Set This Circus Down — Tim McGraw; Steers & Stripes — Brooks & Dunn
Top Female Vocalist of the Year	Top Male Vocalist of the Year
**Martina McBride**; Sara Evans; Faith Hill; Lee Ann Womack; Trisha Yearwood	**Alan Jackson**; Kenny Chesney; Toby Keith; Tim McGraw; Travis Tritt
Top Vocal Group of the Year	Top Vocal Duo of the Year
**Lonestar**; Diamond Rio; Dixie Chicks; Nickel Creek; Trick Pony	**Brooks & Dunn**; Montgomery Gentry; The Bellamy Brothers; The Kinleys; The Warren Brothers
Single Record of the Year	Song of the Year
"**Where Were You (When The World Stopped Turning)**" — **Alan Jackson**; "Ain't Nothing 'Bout You" — Brooks & Dunn; "I Wanna Talk About Me" — Toby Keith; "It's a Great Day to Be Alive" — Travis Tritt; "One More Day" — Diamond Rio	"**Where Were You (When The World Stopped Turning)**" — **Alan Jackson**; "Angels in Waiting" — Tammy Cochran, Stewart Harris and Jim McBride; "I Wanna Talk About Me" — Bobby Braddock; "One More Day" — Bobby Tomberlin and Steven Dale Jones; "Only in America" — Kix Brooks, Don Cook and Ronnie Rogers
Top New Male Vocalist	Top New Female Vocalist
**Phil Vassar**; Chris Cagle; Blake Shelton	**Carolyn Dawn Johnson**; Tammy Cochran; Cyndi Thomson
Top New Vocal Duo or Group of the Year	Video of the Year
**Trick Pony**; Nickel Creek; Sons of the Desert	**"Only in America"** — **Brooks & Dunn**; "Angels in Waiting" — Tammy Cochran; "I Wanna Talk About Me" — Toby Keith; "I'm Tryin'" — Trace Adkins; "Where the Stars and Stripes and the Eagle Fly" — Aaron Tippin
Vocal Event of the Year
**"I am a Man of Constant Sorrow" — Soggy Bottom Boys**; "Beer Run" — Garth Brooks and George Jones; "Bring on the Rain" — Jo Dee Messina and Tim McGraw; "Out of Control Raging Fire" — Patty Loveless and Travis Tritt; "Too Country" — Brad Paisley, Buck Owens, George Jones and Bill Anderson

== Performers ==
Performer(s)	Song(s)
Alan Jackson	"Drive (For Daddy Gene)"
George Strait	"Living and Living Well"
Toby Keith	"Courtesy of the Red, White and Blue (The Angry American)"
Trisha Yearwood	"I Don't Paint Myself into Corners"
Brooks & Dunn; Sheila E.	"My Heart Is Lost to You"
Lee Ann Womack; Willie Nelson	"Mendocino County Line"
Hank Williams Jr.	"Eyes of Waylon"
Jo Dee Messina	"Bring On the Rain"
Travis Tritt; Jerry Douglas	"Modern Day Bonnie and Clyde"
Alabama	"I'm in the Mood"
Kid Rock; Hank Williams Jr.	"The 'F' Word"
Kenny Chesney	"The Good Stuff"
Martina McBride	"Where Would You Be"
Sara Evans	"I Keep Looking"
Tracy Lawrence; Joe Diffie; Mark Chesnutt	"What a Difference You've Made in My Life"
Tim McGraw	"Unbroken"

== Presenters ==
Presenter(s)	Notes
Lolita Davidovich; Montgomery Gentry	Top Vocal Group of the Year
Clint Black	Song of the Year
Gary Allan; Jamie O'Neal	Top New Female Vocalist
Mark Wills; Katie Cook; Greg Martin	Video of the Year
Rascal Flatts; Ty Herndon	Top New Vocal Duo or Group of the Year
Chely Wright; Buck Owens	Top Vocal Duo of the Year
Jessica Andrews; The Bellamy Brothers	Single Record of the Year
Keith Urban; Nancy O'Dell	Top New Male Vocalist
Diamond Rio	Album of the Year
Trisha Yearwood	Present Home Depot Humanitarian Award for Reba McEntire
Trace Adkins; Tara Lipinski	Vocal Event of the Year
LeAnn Rimes	Top Male Vocalist of the Year
Tracy Lawrence; Joe Diffie; Mark Chesnutt	Pioneer Award for Ronnie Milsap
Dean Sams; Aaron Tippin	Top Female Vocalist of the Year
