= One of Those Nights =

One of Those Nights may refer to:

== Music ==
=== Albums ===
- One of Those Nights: The Anthology, 2006 greatest hits collection by band UFO

=== Songs ===
- "One of Those Nights" (Bucks Fizz song), 1981
- "One of Those Nights", song by Lisa Brokop from the album Every Little Girl's Dream (1994)
- "One of Those Nights" (Chris Brown song), 2011 song by Chris Brown from his album Fortune
- "One of Those Nights" (Juicy J song), 2013
- "One of Those Nights" (Tim McGraw song), 2012
- "One of Those Nights Tonight", song by American country music artist Lorrie Morgan from her 1997 album Shakin' Things Up
- "One of Those Nights" (센척안해), 2018 song by Key featuring Crush from his album Face

== See also ==
- One of These Nights (disambiguation)
