= Daddy, Sing to Me =

Single by Lisa Brokop

from the album My Love
- B-side: "Amazing Grace"
- Released: 1990
- Genre: Country
- Length: 3:46
- Label: Brainchild
- Producer: Peter McCann

Lisa Brokop singles chronology
"Daddy, Sing to Me" (1990)	"Old Mister Moon" (1991)

"Daddy, Sing to Me" is a song recorded by Canadian country music artist Lisa Brokop. It was released in 1990 as the first single from her debut album, My Love. It peaked at number 10 on the RPM Country Tracks chart in September 1990.

== Chart performance ==
Chart (1990)	Peak position
Canada Country Singles (RPM)	10
