= Set List =

Set List may refer to:

- Set List (The Frames album), 2002
- Set List (Duane Steele album), 2004
- Set List: Greatest Songs 2006–2007, an album by AKB48
- Setlist.fm, a website for concert set lists

== See also ==
- Set list
