= Tammy Cochran (album) =

Studio album by Tammy Cochran
- Released: May 1, 2001
- Genre: Country
- Length: 36:37
- Label: Epic
- Producer: Blake Chancey

Tammy Cochran chronology
Tammy Cochran (2001)	Life Happened (2002)

Singles from Tammy Cochran
- 1. "If You Can" Released: April 10, 2000; 2. "So What" Released: August 21, 2000; 3. "Angels in Waiting" Released: March 12, 2001; 4. "I Cry" Released: October 22, 2001

Professional ratings
Review scores
Source	Rating
AllMusic	3/5 stars
Entertainment Weekly	B+

Tammy Cochran is the debut studio album by American country music artist of the same name. It was released on May 1, 2001 by Epic Records. It was peaked at #27 on the Billboard Top Country Albums chart. The album includes the singles "If You Can", "So What", "Angels in Waiting" and "I Cry."

== Track listing ==
Tammy Cochran track listing
No.	Title	Writer(s)	Length
1.	"I Cry"	Mark Selby; Tia Sillers	3:34
2.	"If You Can"	Joy Swinea	3:35
3.	"So What"	Roxie Dean; Jamie O'Neal; Sonny Tillis	3:20
4.	"What I Learned from Loving You"	James Hooker Brown, Jr.; Howard Russell Smith	3:47
5.	"That Ain't Right"	Billy Crain; Jon McElroy	3:23
6.	"Say Goodbye"	Bonnie Baker; Jason Deere; Kim Keyes	3:46
7.	"When Love Was Enough"	Tammy Cochran; Tommy Polk; Verlon Thompson	3:01
8.	"Going, Going, Gone"	Sherrié Austin; Jon Davis; Will Rambeaux	4:47
9.	"Better Off Broken"	Lisa Brokop; Ron Harbin; Cyril Rawson	3:47
10.	"Angels in Waiting"	Cochran; Stewart Harris; Jim McBride	3:37
Total length:			36:37

== Personnel ==
- Richard Bennett – acoustic guitar
- Joe Chemay – bass guitar, background vocals
- Tammy Cochran – lead vocals
- Dan Dugmore – electric guitar, steel guitar
- Glen Duncan – fiddle, mandolin
- Carl Gorodetzky – violin
- David Grissom – electric guitar
- Jim Grosjean – viola
- John Barlow Jarvis – keyboards
- Lee Larrison – violin
- Paul Leim – drums, percussion
- Anthony Martin – background vocals
- Steve Nathan – keyboards
- Lisa Silver – background vocals
- Harry Stinson – background vocals
- Cindy Richardson-Walker – background vocals
- Biff Watson – acoustic guitar
- Bergen White – string arrangements, conductor

== Charts ==
=== Weekly charts ===
Chart (2001)	Peak position
US Top Country Albums (Billboard)	27
US Heatseekers Albums (Billboard)	13

=== Year-end charts ===
Chart (2001)	Position
US Top Country Albums (Billboard)	63
