= Good Time (Niko Moon album) =

Studio album by Niko Moon
- Released: August 27, 2021
- Studio: Southern Ground (Nashville); Sound Stage Studios (Nashville)
- Genre: Country
- Length: 45:47
- Label: RCA Nashville
- Producer: Josh Murty; Niko Moon

Niko Moon chronology
Good Time (2021)	Better Days (2024)

Singles from Good Time
- 1. "Good Time" Released: March 16, 2020; 2. "No Sad Songs" Released: April 19, 2021; 3. "Paradise to Me" Released: September 27, 2021

Good Time (stylized in all caps) is the debut studio album by American country music artist Niko Moon. It was released on August 27, 2021, via RCA Records Nashville.

== Content ==
Prior to releasing his debut album, Moon worked as a songwriter for various country music artists, including Zac Brown Band and Dierks Bentley. He also recorded with the former's Zac Brown in the electronic dance music trio Sir Rosevelt.

Moon released "Good Time" as his debut single in 2020, and the song reached the top of Billboard Hot Country Songs and Country Airplay charts in 2021. He wrote all but one of the album's songs with his wife, Anna, and Joshua Murty, with whom he also produced the album. The final track, and the only one which the Moons did not co-write, is a cover of Travis Tritt's 2001 single "It's a Great Day to Be Alive".

== Critical reception ==
Michael Rampa of Country Standard Time gave the album a mixed review, stating that "It is not as if the material is poorly written or the melodies displeasing, given Moon's expectations of positivity but it feels like these songs would fare better in the hands of a jam band outfit like Zac Brown Band that would certainly make it sound more country. But that was not what Moon was going for anyway."

== Track listing ==
All tracks are written by Niko Moon, Anna Moon, and Joshua Murty, except where noted.

No.	Title	Writer(s)	Length
1.	"No Sad Songs"	A. Moon; N. Moon; Murty; Steven Lee Olsen; Alysa Vanderheym	2:52
2.	"Way Back"		2:29
3.	"Paradise to Me"		3:36
4.	"Last Call"		2:41
5.	"Dance with Me"		3:38
6.	"Good Time"	A. Moon; N. Moon; Murty; Jordan Minton; Mark Trussell	3:35
7.	"Let It Ride"		3:07
8.	"She Ain't You"		3:19
9.	"Small Town State of Mind"		2:40
10.	"Good at Loving You"	A. Moon; N. Moon; Murty; Blake Bollinger	3:05
11.	"Without Sayin' a Word"		3:01
12.	"Drunk over You"		2:42
13.	"Diamond"		3:13
14.	"It's a Great Day to Be Alive"	Darrell Scott	3:09

== Personnel ==
Credits adapted from the album's liner notes.

Musicians

- Niko Moon – lead vocals, background vocals, gang vocals, programming, acoustic guitar
- Joshua Murty – acoustic guitar, electric guitar, keyboards, piano, ganjo, banjo, mandolin, bouzouki, nylon string guitar, pedal steel guitar, programming, hand claps, background vocals, gang vocals
- Derek Wells – acoustic guitar, electric guitar, dobro, banjo, ganjo, mandolin, bouzouki, baritone guitar
- Ian Fitchuk – B-3 organ, piano
- Brandon Hood – dobro, ganjo, mandolin
- Russ Pahl – pedal steel guitar
- Justin Schipper – pedal steel guitar
- Bryan Sutton – acoustic guitar
- Chris McHugh – percussion
- Phil Lawson – percussion
- Jason Kyle Saetveit – background vocals
- Noel Bisesti – background vocals, gang vocals

Production

- Joshua Murty – producer, engineering, digital editing
- Niko Moon – producer, engineering
- Andrew Boullianne – assistant engineering
- Trey Keller – digital editing
- Jon Castelli – mixing
- Josh Deguzman – mix engineer
- Dale Becker – mastering
- Hector Vega – audio engineer
- Fili Filizzola – audio engineer
- Connor Hedge – audio engineer

== Chart performance ==
Weekly chart performance for Good Time
Chart (2021)	Peak position
US Top Country Albums (Billboard)	12
US Billboard 200	139
