= Love Won't Let Me =

Single by Tammy Cochran

from the album Life Happened
- B-side: "Angels in Waiting"
- Released: December 7, 2002
- Genre: Country
- Length: 2:57
- Label: Epic
- Songwriters: Jason Deere, Franne Golde, Kasey Livingston
- Producers: Billy Joe Walker Jr., Anthony S. Martin

Tammy Cochran singles chronology
"Life Happened" (2002)	"Love Won't Let Me" (2002)	"What Kind of Woman Should I Be" (2003)

"Love Won't Let Me" is a song written by Jason Deere, Franne Golde and Kasey Livingston. It was first released in 2000 by Brazilian singer Wanessa Camargo for her self-titled debut album in English and Portuguese (retitled "O Amor Não Deixa"), then in 2002 by American country music artist Tammy Cochran.

Cochran's version was released in December 2002 as the second single from the album Life Happened. The song reached #31 on the Billboard Hot Country Singles & Tracks chart.

== Chart performance ==
Chart (2002–2003)	Peak position
US Hot Country Songs (Billboard)	31

== Wanessa Camargo version ==
The first release recording of the song was in 2000 by Brazilian singer Wanessa Camargo as "O Amor Não Deixa". It was released as her first single, with the original English version "Love Won't Let Me" also appearing on her debut album Wanessa Camargo. The Portuguese lyrics were written by Cesar Lemos. Camargo's English and Portuguese versions of the song were both produced by Jason Deere.
