= I'll Be Alright =

I'll Be Alright may refer to:

- I'll Be Alright (album), a 2000 album by Duane Steele
- "I'll Be Alright" (Anggun song), released in 2006
- "I'll Be Alright" (Passion Pit song), released in 2012
- "I'll Be Alright", a 2007 song by Sarah Geronimo from Taking Flight
- "I'll Be Alright", a 1988 song by Christopher Cross from Back of My Mind
