= Better Off Broken =

Single by Lisa Brokop

from the album When You Get to Be You
- Released: 1999
- Genre: Country
- Length: 3:16
- Label: Columbia
- Songwriters: Lisa Brokop; Ron Harbin; Cyril Rawson
- Producers: Dann Huff; Paul Worley

Lisa Brokop singles chronology
"Ain't Enough Roses" (1999)	"Better Off Broken" (1999)	"Cool Summer Night" (1999)

"Better Off Broken" is a song recorded by Canadian country music artist Lisa Brokop. It was released in 1999 as the fifth single from her fourth studio album, When You Get to Be You. It peaked at number 8 on the RPM Country Tracks chart in June 1999.

The song was also recorded by Tammy Cochran on her 2001 self-titled debut album.

== Chart performance ==
Chart (1999)	Peak position
Canada Country Singles (RPM)	8

=== Year-end charts ===
Chart (1999)	Position
Canada Country Tracks (RPM)	71
