= Duane Steele =

Canadian singer-songwriter

- Origin: Hines Creek, Alberta, Canada
- Genres: Country
- Occupation: Singer-songwriter
- Instruments: Vocals, Guitar
- Years active: 1984–present
- Labels: Mercury; Royalty; Icon
- Website: www.duanesteele.com

Duane Björklund (born 1968) known professionally as Duane Steele, is a Canadian country music artist. He has released five studio albums and one greatest hits album, and has charted multiple singles on the Canadian country singles charts, including the Number One hit "Anita Got Married" in 1996. A new album entitled "Drive On" was released in 2019.

== Biography ==
Steele's career began when he became the lead singer of the band Rock 'N' Horse in 1984 under his real name of Duane Björklund. The band released one album, Highways, in 1991, and the song "Real Good Love" reached No. 69 on the Canadian country singles chart. However, members of the band went their separate ways in 1993.

Steele moved to Nashville and signed a publishing contract with Warner-Chappell. He scored a record deal with Mercury Records in 1995 after a performance during Canadian Country Music Week. The following year, he released his debut solo album, P.O. Box 423. The first four singles from the project all reached the top 10 on the Canadian country chart, including "Anita Got Married," which became Steele's first No. 1 song. He was nominated for the Vista Rising Star Award by the Canadian Country Music Association (CCMA) in 1996, but lost to Terri Clark. He also received a nomination for Male Vocalist of the Year. In 1997, the Juno Awards nominated Steele for Best Country Male Vocalist, and also the all-genre Best New Solo Artist. He won his first award, Vocal Event of the Year, at the 1997 CCMA Awards for his duet with Lisa Brokop, "Two Names On An Overpass."

Steele's second album, This Is the Life, was released in September 1997. The disc included a cover of Gordon Lightfoot's "If You Could Read My Mind." The first two singles, "Tell The Girl" and "If I Could Just Get To You," both reached the Canadian top 10. Steele was again nominated for Male Vocalist of the Year in 1998 at both the CCMA Awards and the Juno Awards. When subsequent singles failed to reach the top 30, Steele and Mercury parted ways.

Steele moved back to Canada in 1999 and began writing for his third album. I'll Be Alright was released in August 2000 on Steele's own Jolt Records and distributed by Royalty Records. Seven singles were released from the project, including "The Good Side Of Your Goodbye," "This Is Love," "I-65" and "The Heart Of The It Don't Matter." In 2001, the CCMA named Steele Independent Male Artist of the Year.

Steele released a greatest hits album, Set List, in 2004. The album collected seventeen of Steele's biggest hits, along with three new songs. Steele's fourth studio album, Ghost Town, was released in 2006 on Icon Records. It was followed by Gas and Time, released in 2010 on Jolt. A new album entitled "Drive On" was released in 2019.

== Discography ==
=== Studio albums ===
Title	Album details	Peak positions
Title	Album details	CAN Country
P.O. Box 423	Release date: February 1996; Label: Mercury Records; Formats: CD, cassette	32
This Is the Life	Release date: September 1997; Label: Mercury Records; Formats: CD, cassette	—
I'll Be Alright	Release date: August 2000; Label: Jolt/Royalty Records; Formats: CD, cassette	—
Ghost Town	Release date: 4 July 2006; Label: Icon Records; Formats: CD, music download	—
Gas and Time	Release date: 1 June 2010; Label: Jolt Records; Formats: CD, music download	—
Dirt and Dreams	Release date: 17 February 2015; Label: Jolt Records; Formats: CD, music download	—
"—" denotes releases that did not chart

=== Compilation albums ===
Title	Album details
Set List	Release date: 1 June 2004; Label: Jolt/Royalty Records; Formats: CD, music download

=== Singles ===
==== 1990s ====
Year	Single	Peak positions	Album
Year	Single	CAN Country	Album
1996	"Stuck on Your Love"	2	P.O. Box 423
1996	"Anita Got Married"	1	P.O. Box 423
1996	"The Trouble with Love"	3	P.O. Box 423
1996	"She's Tough"	10	P.O. Box 423
1997	"Two Names on an Overpass" (featuring Lisa Brokop)	21	P.O. Box 423
1997	"Tell the Girl"	9	This Is the Life
1998	"If I Could Just Get to You"	10	This Is the Life
1998	"If You Could Read My Mind"	32	This Is the Life
1998	"Right From the Start"	37	This Is the Life
1999	"Little Black Dress"	33	This Is the Life

==== 2000s and 2010s ====
Year	Single	Album
2000	"Make Me Crazy"	I'll Be Alright
2001	"I'll Be Alright"	I'll Be Alright
2001	"The Goodside of Your Goodbye"	I'll Be Alright
2001	"What to Do"	I'll Be Alright
2002	"This Is Love"	I'll Be Alright
2002	"I-65"	I'll Be Alright
2003	"The Heart of the It Don't Matter"	I'll Be Alright
2004	"Better Man"	Set List
2004	"Nobody Cheated, Nobody Lied"	Set List
2005	"Sad Country Song"	Set List
2006	"Comin' Back Around"	Ghost Town
2006	"Ghost Town"	Ghost Town
2007	"What D'Ya Say"	Ghost Town
2007	"Blue Collar Man"	Ghost Town
2007	"Real Close"	Ghost Town
2008	"Two People in a Room" (featuring Stacie Roper)	Ghost Town
2008	"Bustin' Out"	Ghost Town
2009	"Farm Girl"	Gas and Time
2010	"Blessed"	Gas and Time
2011	"Waste of Good Whisky" (featuring Sean Hogan)	Gas and Time
2012	"Gas and Time"	Gas and Time
2015	"Brave"	Dirt and Dreams

=== Featured singles ===
Year	Single	Artist	Peak positions	Album
Year	Single	Artist	CAN Country	Album
1999	"Forever in Love"	Shirley Myers	9	There Will Come a Day

=== Music videos ===
Year	Video	Director
1996	"Stuck on Your Love"	
1996	"Anita Got Married"	
1996	"The Trouble with Love"	
1996	"She's Tough"	Keith Harrick
1997	"Two Names on an Overpass" (featuring Lisa Brokop)	
1997	"Tell the Girl"	
1998	"Right from the Start"	
2000	"Make Me Crazy"	
2001	"The Goodside of Your Goodbye"	
2002	"This Is Love"	
2004	"Better Man"	

== Awards ==
Canadian Country Music Awards

- 1997 – Vocal Collaboration of the Year ("Two Names On An Overpass" with Lisa Brokop)
- 2001 – Independent Male Artist of the Year
