= Sharon Anderson (singer) =

Canadian country music singer

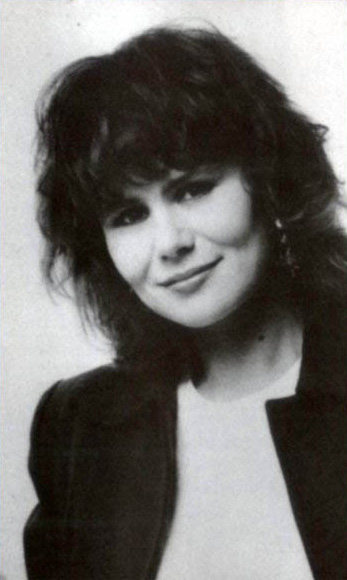

Background information
- Origin: Edmonton, Alberta, Canada
- Genres: Country, folk
- Occupation: singer/songwriter
- Instruments: Vocals, guitar
- Years active: 1988 – present
- Labels: Curb, Capitol, Liberty, Royalty
- Formerly of: Trinity Lane
- Website: sharonlenoreanderson.com

Sharon Lenore Anderson is a Canadian country music singer. During the late 1980s Anderson was a member of country group Trinity Lane, who charted three singles on Billboard Hot Country Singles chart in 1988. In 1991, she signed to Capitol Nashville and released her solo debut album, The Bottom Line, the same year. The album produced two singles that charted on the RPM Country Tracks chart in Canada. Another album, Bringing It Home, was released on Royalty Records in 1995.

As a songwriter Anderson co-wrote fellow Canadian country singer Lisa Brokop's 1994 Top 20 single "Give Me a Ring Sometime". Anderson recorded her own version, as "Gimme a Ring Sometime", on her 1995 album.

== Discography ==
=== Albums ===
Title	Details
The Bottom Line	Release date: June 4, 1991; Label: Capitol Nashville
Bringing It Home	Release date: January 1, 1995; Label: Royalty Records
Life and Times	Release date: April 2011; Label: RDR Music
Enchanted Trails	Release date: 2016; Available to listen or purchase: CDbaby and YouTube
Trinity Lane	Release date: 2016; Available to listen or purchase: Cdbaby and YouTube

=== Singles ===
Year	Single	Chart Positions		Album
Year	Single	CAN Country	US Country	Album
1988	"For a Song"	—	75	Non-album song (with Trinity Lane)
1988	"Someday, Somenight"	—	70	Non-album song (with Trinity Lane)
1988	"Ready to Take That Ride"	—	90	Non-album song (with Trinity Lane)
1991	"Unbelievable Love"	52	—	The Bottom Line
1991	"Go for Broke"	—	—	The Bottom Line
1991	"Pony"	—	—	The Bottom Line
1992	"The Wheel of Love"	84	—	The Bottom Line
1995	"I Take It Back"	47	—	Bringing It Home
1996	"Too Cool"	57	—	Bringing It Home
2011	"Springtime Johnny"	—	—	Life and Times
2011	"Long Gone Free"	—	—	Life and Times
2011	"I Got Love"	—	—	Life and Times
"—" denotes releases that did not chart

== See also ==
- Music of Canada
- List of Canadian musicians
