= Best of Intentions =

2000 single by Travis Tritt

Single by Travis Tritt

from the album Down the Road I Go
- B-side: "Southbound Train"
- Released: June 26, 2000
- Genre: Country
- Length: 4:17
- Label: Columbia Nashville 12778
- Songwriter: Travis Tritt
- Producers: Billy Joe Walker Jr. Travis Tritt

Travis Tritt singles chronology
"Start the Car" (1999)	"Best of Intentions" (2000)	"It's a Great Day to Be Alive" (2000)

"Best of Intentions" is a song written and recorded by American country music singer Travis Tritt. It was released in June 2000 as the first single from his album, Down the Road I Go. The song reached the top of the Billboard Hot Country Singles & Tracks chart and peaked at number 27 on the U.S. Billboard Hot 100 chart, his highest charting single to date. It also became Tritt's first Number One single since "Foolish Pride" in 1994, and his last number one of his career. It was also his first top 10 hit since "Where Corn Don't Grow" in 1997.

== Content ==
The song is a ballad in which the narrator discusses about his best intentions which never materialized into the life he had always planned to build for his significant other.

== Critical reception ==
Deborah Evans Price, of Billboard magazine reviewed the song favorably saying that it is a "gorgeous ballad" and that "the song boasts a sweet melody and tender lyric." Price goes on to say that it is a "stirring anthem of devotion that will likely strike a chord with country listeners."

== Music video ==
The music video for "Best of Intentions" was filmed at Tennessee State Penitentiary, where movies such as Marie, Ernest Goes to Jail, Last Dance and The Green Mile were filmed. It features Tritt portraying a prison inmate, scenes also feature him singing the song, and sitting on his stool.

== Chart positions ==
"Best of Intentions" debuted at number 62 on the U.S. Billboard Hot Country Singles & Tracks for the week of July 1, 2000.

Chart (2000)	Peak position
Canada Country Singles (RPM)	3^{[A]}
US Hot Country Songs (Billboard)	1
US Billboard Hot 100	27

=== Year-end charts ===
Chart (2000)	Position
US Country Songs (Billboard)	40

Chart (2001)	Position
US Country Songs (Billboard)	48

=== Notes ===
- A RPM ceased publication on November 13, 2000. The song had not yet reached its peak.
