= Angeline (Sean Hogan song) =

Single by Sean Hogan

from the album Hijacked
- Released: 2000
- Genre: Country
- Length: 3:20
- Label: Barnstorm
- Songwriter: Sean Hogan
- Producers: Rick Hutt; Sean Hogan

Sean Hogan singles chronology
"Dream Vacation" (2000)	"Angeline" (2000)	"Love Letters" (2000)

"Angeline" is a song recorded by Canadian country music artist Sean Hogan. It was released in 2000 as the fifth single from his second studio album, Hijacked. It peaked at number 8 on the RPM Country Tracks chart in September 2000.

== Chart performance ==
Chart (2000)	Peak position
Canada Country Singles (RPM)	8
