= Love of a Woman =

2001 single by Travis Tritt

Single by Travis Tritt

from the album Down the Road I Go
- Released: June 11, 2001
- Recorded: 2000
- Genre: Country
- Length: 3:38
- Label: Columbia Nashville
- Songwriter: Kevin Brandt
- Producers: Billy Joe Walker Jr., Travis Tritt

Travis Tritt singles chronology
"It's a Great Day to Be Alive" (2000)	"Love of a Woman" (2001)	"Modern Day Bonnie and Clyde" (2002)

"Love of a Woman" is a song written by Kevin Brandt, and recorded by American country music artist Travis Tritt. It was released in June 2001 as the third single from his album Down the Road I Go. It peaked at number 2 on the U.S. Billboard Hot Country Singles & Tracks, as did Travis Tritt's previous single "It's a Great Day to Be Alive". It also peaked at number 39 on the U.S. Billboard Hot 100.

== Critical reception ==
Chuck Taylor, of Billboard magazine reviewed the song favorably calling it "a gorgeous, understated ballad about the virtues of a good woman's love." He went on to mention that the production is "low-key" and Tritt's vocal is "an engaging blend of country-boy grit and heartfelt passion."

== Music video ==
The music video was directed by Michael Merriman. It was released in August 2001.

== Chart positions ==
Chart (2001)	Peak position
US Hot Country Songs (Billboard)	2
US Billboard Hot 100	39

=== Year-end charts ===
Chart (2001)	Position
US Country Songs (Billboard)	37
