= Sure Fire Love =

Single by Sean Hogan

from the album Hijacked
- Released: 1999
- Genre: Country
- Length: 3:37
- Label: Barnstorm
- Songwriter: Sean Hogan
- Producers: Rick Hutt; Sean Hogan

Sean Hogan singles chronology
"Walk the Talk" (1998)	"Sure Fire Love" (1999)	"Tired of Leavin'" (1999)

"Sure Fire Love" is a song recorded by Canadian country music artist Sean Hogan. It was released in 1999 as the second single from his second studio album, Hijacked. It peaked at number 9 on the RPM Country Tracks chart in August 1999.

== Chart performance ==
Chart (1999)	Peak position
Canada Country Singles (RPM)	9

=== Year-end charts ===
Chart (1999)	Position
Canada Country Tracks (RPM)	62
