= Modern Day Bonnie and Clyde =

2002 song by Travis Tritt

Single by Travis Tritt

from the album Down the Road I Go
- B-side: "'It's a Great Day to Be Alive"
- Released: January 7, 2002
- Recorded: 2000
- Genre: Country
- Length: 4:44 (album version); 3:59 (single version)
- Label: Columbia Nashville
- Songwriters: Walt Aldridge; James LeBlanc
- Producers: Travis Tritt; Billy Joe Walker Jr.

Travis Tritt singles chronology
| "Love of a Woman" (2001) | "Modern Day Bonnie and Clyde" (2002) | "Strong Enough to Be Your Man" (2002) |

"Modern Day Bonnie and Clyde" is a song written by Walt Aldridge and James LeBlanc, and recorded by American country music artist Travis Tritt. It was released in January 2002 as the fourth and final single from his album Down the Road I Go. It peaked at number 8, and is his last top ten hit to date.

== Content ==
The song describes a man who meets a woman at a truck stop in Johnson City, Tennessee. After leaving town, the woman robs a convenience store, and tells the man to drive away. Then later that night, after heading north on Interstate 95, the man and the woman are both arrested counting the money in a motel room in Richmond, Virginia.

== Critical reception ==
Chuck Taylor, of Billboard magazine, reviewed the song favorably, saying that the song has a "swampy, hypnotic appeal that commands attention." He went on to say that "the retro intro in this engaging musical outing serves notice that there is something cool and quite different in the air."

== Music video ==
The music video was directed by Michael Merriman, was filmed in California, instead of Tennessee and Virginia, like in the song's lyric, and features actor Billy Bob Thornton, who plays the man. The woman comes up to him at a truck stop and asks for a ride. The woman then robs a convenience store, and asks the man to drive away as the clerk is chasing her down. The man tells her that robbing the store was a big deal, while the woman thought that it was no big deal. He wonders what she was doing with a gun, and he also wonders how much money is in one of her bags. Later that night, at a motel, they're counting all the money, and enjoying themselves, at least until the police arrives, and the man and the woman are both arrested. The woman tries to fool one of the cops into letting her go, but the cop doesn't buy it. Travis Tritt plays the tow truck driver, who tows the man's car away with the man looking at it being towed away, and looking ashamed. In between these scenes, Tritt and 2 band members are also seen performing the song in an office setting.

== Chart positions ==
"Modern Day Bonnie and Clyde" debuted at number fifty-six on the U.S. Billboard Hot Country Singles & Tracks for the week of January 12, 2002.

| Chart (2002) | Peak position |
|---|---|
| US Hot Country Songs (Billboard) | 8 |
| US Billboard Hot 100 | 55 |

=== Year-end charts ===
| Chart (2002) | Position |
|---|---|
| US Country Songs (Billboard) | 45 |
