= How Do I Let Go =

Single by Lisa Brokop

from the album When You Get to Be You
- B-side: "Ain't Enough Roses"
- Released: May 26, 1998
- Genre: Country
- Length: 3:40
- Label: Columbia
- Songwriters: Karen Taylor-Good; Lisa Brokop
- Producers: Dann Huff; Paul Worley

Lisa Brokop singles chronology
"West of Crazy" (1996)	"How Do I Let Go" (1998)	"What's Not to Love" (1998)

"How Do I Let Go" is a song recorded by Canadian country music artist Lisa Brokop. It was released in May 1998 as the first single from her fourth studio album, When You Get to Be You. It peaked at number 19 on the RPM Country Tracks chart in June 1998.

== Chart performance ==
Chart (1998)	Peak position
Canada Country Singles (RPM)	19
US Hot Country Songs (Billboard)	59

=== Year-end charts ===
Chart (1998)	Position
Canada Country Tracks (RPM)	99
