= Sean Hogan =

Canadian country music singer-songwriter

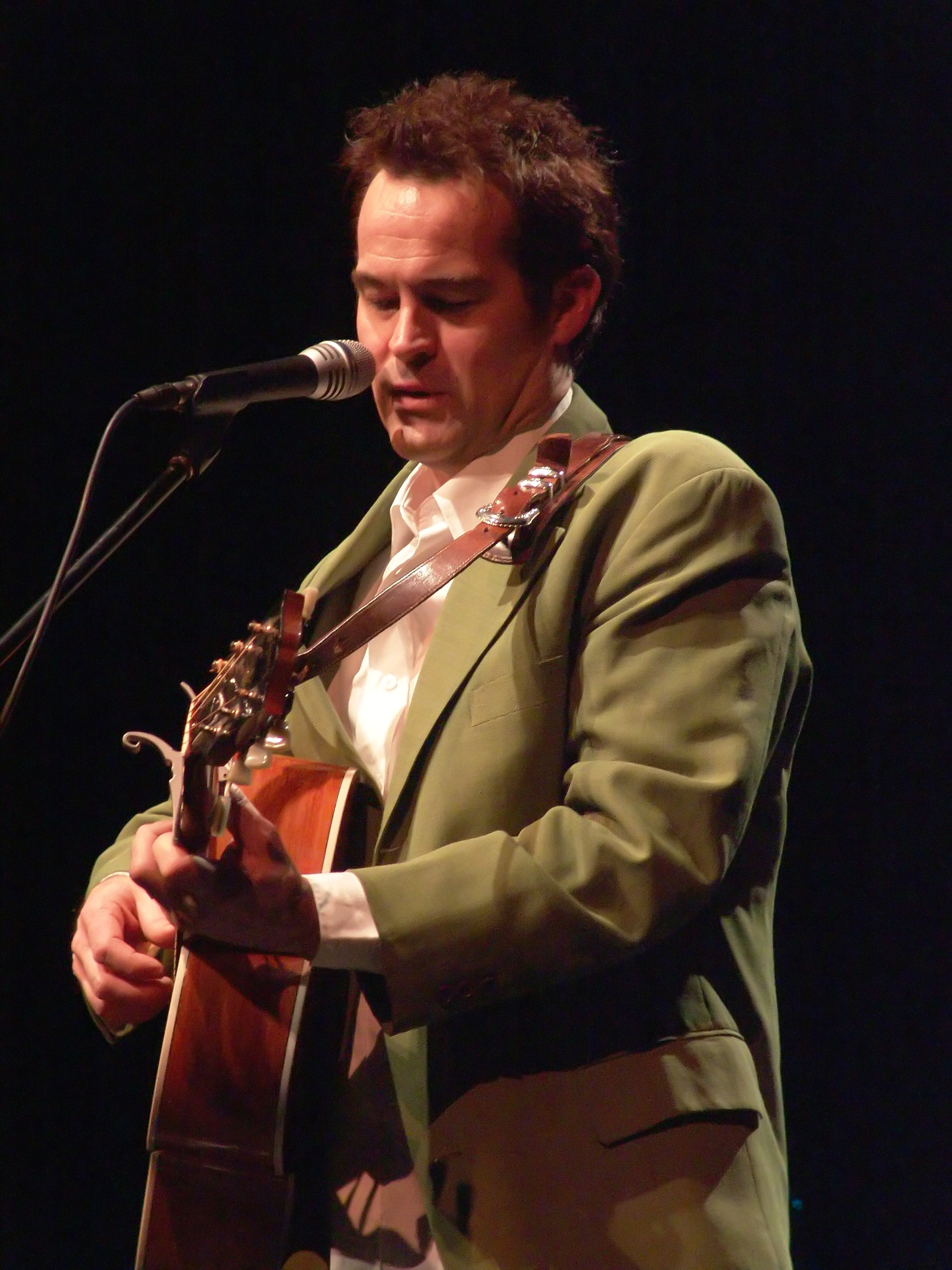
- Sean Hogan, November 2005

Background information
- Origin: Sarnia, Ontario, Canada
- Genres: Country
- Occupation: singer-songwriter
- Instrument: Guitar
- Years active: 1996–present
- Labels: Barnstorm; Raving Rooster
- Website: www.seanhogan.net

Sean Hogan is a Canadian country music singer-songwriter.

== Biography ==
Born in Sarnia, Ontario, Hogan attended Fanshawe College in London, Ontario, studying music. In 2003 he won the Roots Artist of the Year at the Canadian Country Music Awards and he has also won the Independent Male Artist of the Year award in 1997. Hogan engages in charity work and in 2005 the Saskatchewan Country Music Association named him Humanitarian of the Year.

== Discography ==
=== Albums ===
Title	Details
Sean Hogan	Release date: April 1996; Label: Barnstorm
Hijacked	Release date: June 1999; Label: Barnstorm
Late Last Night	Release date: November 20, 2001; Label: Barnstorm
Ruled by Mercury (U.S. release)	Release date: 2002; Label: Barnstorm
Catalina Sunrise	Release date: April 2005; Label: Raving Rooster
The Southern Sessions	Release date: June 2007; Label: Raving Rooster
Conspiracy Radio	Release date: July 2008; Label: Northbuck Records
The Southern Sessions (U.S. release)	Release date: September 15, 2009; Label: Lakeland Heart
Phoenix	Release date: March 20, 2012; Label: Lakeland Heart

=== Singles ===
==== 1996–2000 ====
Year	Single	Peak positions	Album
Year	Single	CAN Country	Album
1996	"Beg, Borrow and Steal the World"	25	Sean Hogan
1996	"Vulnerable"	25	Sean Hogan
1997	"Slow Turning"	20	Sean Hogan
1997	"Wild Rose"	19	Sean Hogan
1997	"Heaven by Your Side"	26	Sean Hogan
1998	"The Outcome"	37	Sean Hogan
1998	"Nothin' Could Be Better"	59	Sean Hogan
1998	"Walk the Talk"	40	Hijacked
1999	"Sure Fire Love"	9	Hijacked
1999	"Tired of Leavin'"	19	Hijacked
2000	"Dream Vacation"	19	Hijacked
2000	"Angeline"	8	Hijacked
2000	"Love Letters"	*	Hijacked
* denotes unknown peak positions

==== 2001–present ====
Year	Single	Album
2001	"Silver Lining Girl"	Hijacked
2001	"Hijacked"	Hijacked
2001	"I'd Rather Have You"	Late Last Night
2002	"Come Another Fine Day"	Late Last Night
2002	"Your Rockin' Horse"	Late Last Night
2003	"Love of Life"	Late Last Night
2003	"Ruled by Mercury"	Late Last Night
2004	"Centered"	Catalina Sunrise
2004	"Catalina Sunrise"	Catalina Sunrise
2004	"It's Christmas Time" (Sean Hogan & Friends)^{[A]}	Catalina Sunrise
2005	"My Livin' End Begins"	Catalina Sunrise
2005	"A Cowboy's Heart"	Catalina Sunrise
2006	"Yesterday's Town"	Catalina Sunrise
2006	"Sweet Talk Me"	Catalina Sunrise
2007	"What Would You Have Me Believe"	The Southern Sessions
2007	"Shangri-La"	The Southern Sessions
2007	"Don't Sweat the Small Stuff"	The Southern Sessions
2008	"Genuine Love"	The Southern Sessions
2008	"Suck It Up"	The Southern Sessions
2009	"Straight"	The Southern Sessions
2009	"Catalina Sunrise" (U.S. release)	Conspiracy Radio
2009	"Heartbreak Song"	The Southern Sessions
2010	"Something Beautiful"	Phoenix
2011	"Travel Plans"	Phoenix
2011	"A Song We Can Sing To"	Phoenix
2011	"Better Angels Prevail"	Phoenix
2012	"Like We Never Had to Say Goodbye"	Phoenix
2012	"Phoenix"	Phoenix
2012	"Make It Look Easy"	Phoenix
2013	"One Kiss from You"	Phoenix
2013	"Come Hell or High Water (See What Love Can Do)" (Sean Hogan & Friends)^{[B]}	—
2018	"California"	

Notes

- A Featuring Gord Bamford, Duane Steele, Jake Mathews, Diane Chase, Jamie Warren, Brad Johner, Lisa Hewitt, Colin Amey, Val LeRoy and Tracey James.
- B Featuring Beverley Mahood, Patricia Conroy, Bobby Wills, Amber Marshall, Wildflower, Angela Harris, Shane Yellowbird, Jake Mathews, Jamie Warren, Tenille, Pear and Leonard Bearshirt & Spirit Horse.

=== Guest singles ===
Year	Single	Artist	Album
2011	"Waste of Good Whisky"	Duane Steele	Gas and Time

=== Music videos ===
Year	Video	Director
1996	"Beg, Borrow and Steal the World"	Jason Bourque
1996	"Vulnerable"	Jason Bourque
1997	"Slow Turning"	Jason Bourque
1997	"Wild Rose"	Jason Bourque
1997	"Heaven by Your Side"	Jason Bourque
1998	"The Outcome"	Jason Bourque
1998	"Walk the Talk"	Jason Bourque
1999	"Sure Fire Love"	Jason Bourque
1999	"Tired of Leavin'"	Jason Bourque
2000	"Dream Vacation"	
2001	"Silver Lining Girl"	
2001	"Hijacked"	
2002	"I'd Rather Have You"	Colin Cunningham
2002	"Come Another Fine Day"	Colin Cunningham
2004	"Catalina Sunrise"	Colin Cunningham
2004	"It's Christmas Time" (Sean Hogan & Friends)	
2005	"A Cowboy's Heart"	Colin Cunningham
2011	"Travel Plans"	Colin Cunningham
2011	"A Song We Can Sing To"	Colin Cunningham
2013	"Come Hell or High Water (See What Love Can Do)" (Sean Hogan & Friends)	Colin Cunningham
