= Critterland =

Studio album by Willi Carlisle
- Released: January 26, 2024
- Genre: Country folk
- Length: 42:26
- Label: Signature Sounds
- Producer: Darrell Scott

Willi Carlisle chronology
Peculiar, Missouri (2022)	Critterland (2024)

Critterland is the third studio album by American folk singer Willi Carlisle, released on January 26, 2024, through Signature Sounds Recordings. It received acclaim from critics.

== Critical reception ==
Professional ratings
Aggregate scores
Source	Rating
Metacritic	85/100
Review scores
Source	Rating
Paste	7.5/10
PopMatters	8/10
Slant Magazine	4.5/5 stars

Critterland received a score of 85 out of 100 on review aggregator Metacritic based on four critics' reviews, indicating "universal acclaim". Tom Williams of Slant Magazine wrote that "Carlisle is a singular artist and that Critterland is a worthy addition to the canon of country-folk classics". Steve Horowitz of PopMatters commented that "nine of the ten songs are three-to-four-minute ditties sung over traditional-style strings" as "Carlisle croons in a clear voice layered with dust. He clearly articulates the words and emphasizes the important ones. The details matter."

Paste's Eric R. Danton found that the album "doesn't have the same sweeping scope as its predecessor", 2022's Peculiar, Missouri, but "he digs deeper on Critterland, an album that is more about making the best of heavy circumstances". John Moore of Glide Magazine described it as "a much broader lyrical and musically ambitious album than the last outing, occasionally great and occasionally, well, a little too overwhelming".

== Track listing ==
All tracks are written by Willi Carlisle; "When the Pills Wear Off" co-written by Billy Keane.

Critterland track listing
No.	Title	Length
1.	"Critterland"	4:09
2.	"Dry County Dust"	4:27
3.	"The Arrangements"	4:31
4.	"The Great Depression"	3:21
5.	"Two-Headed Lamb"	3:39
6.	"Higher Lonesome"	4:25
7.	"I Want No Children"	2:40
8.	"Jaybird"	3:53
9.	"When the Pills Wear Off"	4:10
10.	"The Money Grows on Trees"	7:11
Total length:		42:26

== Personnel ==
Credits adapted from the album's liner notes.

- Willi Carlisle – vocals (all tracks), harmonica (1, 4, 6), banjo (1, 4, 8), button box (1, 5), guitar (2, 3, 6, 9), flatpicked guitar (4), fiddle (7)
- Darrell Scott – pedal steel guitar (1, 2); guitar, dulcimer (1, 8); lap steel (3, 6, 8), baritone guitar (3), fingerpicked guitar (4), mandolin (6), banjo (7), vocals (8), piano (9), front-porch banjo (10)
- Jude Brothers – vocals (7)
- Jonathan Yudkin – strings (9)
