= Ghost Town (Duane Steele album) =

Studio album by Duane Steele
- Released: July 4, 2006
- Genre: Country
- Length: 34:46
- Label: Icon Records
- Producer: Steve Fox; Duane Steele

Duane Steele chronology
Set List (2004)	Ghost Town (2006)	Gas and Time (2010)

Ghost Town is the fourth studio album by Canadian country music artist Duane Steele. It was released by Icon Records on July 4, 2006. Singles released from the album include "Comin' Back Around," the title track, "What D'Ya Say," "Blue Collar Man," "Real Close," "Two People in a Room" and "Bustin' Out."

== Track listing ==
1. "Comin' Back Around" – 3:12
2. "Ghost Town" – 3:26
3. "Blue Collar Man" – 3:15
4. "Real Close" – 3:13
5. "Bustin' Out" – 4:06
6. "Livin' Backwards" – 3:30
7. "Two People in a Room" – 4:00
  - duet with Stacie Roper of Hey Romeo
8. "What D'Ya Say" – 2:43
9. "The Man Who Never Wakes Up" – 3:12
10. "Ode to Dad" – 4:09
