= I Cry (Tammy Cochran song) =

Single by Tammy Cochran

from the album Tammy Cochran
- Released: November 17, 2001
- Genre: Country
- Length: 3:34
- Label: Epic
- Songwriters: Tia Sillers, Mark Selby
- Producer: Blake Chancey

Tammy Cochran singles chronology
"Angels in Waiting" (2001)	"I Cry" (2001)	"Life Happened" (2002)

"I Cry" is a song written by Tia Sillers and Mark Selby, and recorded by American country music artist Tammy Cochran. It was released in November 2001 as the fourth single from the album Tammy Cochran. The song reached number 18 on the Billboard Hot Country Singles & Tracks chart.

== Charts ==
=== Weekly charts ===
Chart (2001–2002)	Peak position
US Hot Country Songs (Billboard)	18
US Bubbling Under Hot 100 (Billboard)	7

=== Year-end charts ===
Chart (2002)	Position
US Country Songs (Billboard)	59
