= Down the Road I Go =

Studio album by Travis Tritt
- Released: October 3, 2000
- Genre: Country
- Length: 42:37
- Label: Columbia Nashville
- Producers: Travis Tritt; Billy Joe Walker, Jr.

Travis Tritt chronology
No More Looking Over My Shoulder (1998)	Down the Road I Go (2000)	Strong Enough (2002)

Singles from Down the Road I Go
- 1. "Best of Intentions" Released: June 26, 2000; 2. "It's a Great Day to Be Alive" Released: December 18, 2000; 3. "Love of a Woman" Released: June 11, 2001; 4. "Modern Day Bonnie and Clyde" Released: January 7, 2002

Professional ratings
Review scores
Source	Rating
AllMusic	3/5 stars
Entertainment Weekly	B+

Down the Road I Go is American country music artist Travis Tritt's seventh studio album. It was released on October 3, 2000, his first album for Columbia Records. The tracks "Best of Intentions", "It's a Great Day to Be Alive", "Love of a Woman", and "Modern Day Bonnie and Clyde" were released as singles. "It's a Great Day to Be Alive" was originally recorded in 1996 by Jon Randall for an album which was never released. "Best of Intentions" was a Number One hit for him, and his first chart-topper since "Foolish Pride" in 1994. The album is certified Platinum for sales of over 1,000,000.

== Critical reception ==
People wrote that "Tritt emerges sounding strangely like Kenny Rogers, right down to the hokey catch in the voice and the melodramatic story song, in this case an ill-advised tribute to a couple of sadistic thugs, 'Modern Day Bonnie and Clyde'."

== Track listing ==
CD
No.	Title	Writer(s)	Length
1.	"Down the Road I Go"	Travis Tritt; Dennis Robbins; Bob DiPiero	3:26
2.	"Livin' on Borrowed Time"	Tritt; Robbins; DiPiero	3:03
3.	"Best of Intentions"	Tritt	4:17
4.	"It's a Great Day to Be Alive"	Darrell Scott	4:01
5.	"Love of a Woman"	Kevin Brandt	3:38
6.	"Never Get Away from Me (For Waylon and Jessi)"	Tritt; Robbins; DiPiero	3:54
7.	"Modern Day Bonnie and Clyde"	Walt Aldridge; James LeBlanc	4:44
8.	"I Wish I Was Wrong"	Monte Warden; Tommy Conners	3:56
9.	"If The Fall Don't Kill You"	Tritt; Charlie Daniels	3:37
10.	"Just Too Tired to Fight It"	Tritt; Stewart Harris	4:01
11.	"Southbound Train"	Tritt; Daniels	4:00
Total length:			42:37

== Personnel ==
- Mike Brignardello - bass guitar
- James Burton - electric guitar
- Larry Byrom - acoustic guitar
- Pat Coil - synthesizer
- John Cowan - background vocals
- Jerry Douglas - dobro
- Dan Dugmore - acoustic slide guitar, steel guitar
- Glen Duncan - fiddle
- Ray Flacke - electric guitar
- Aubrey Haynie - fiddle, mandolin
- Wes Hightower - background vocals
- Carl Jackson - banjo, background vocals
- John Barlow Jarvis - organ, piano
- Kirk "Jelly Roll" Johnson - harmonica
- Albert Lee - electric guitar
- Mac McAnally - acoustic guitar
- Dana McVicker - background vocals
- Brent Mason - electric guitar
- Greg Morrow - drums, percussion
- John Wesley Ryles - background vocals
- Travis Tritt - lead vocals, background vocals
- Billy Joe Walker Jr. - acoustic guitar, electric guitar, sitar, electric mandotar
- Glenn Worf - bass guitar
- Curtis Wright - background vocals

== Charts ==
=== Weekly charts ===
Chart (2000)	Peak position
Canadian Country Albums (RPM)	18
US Billboard 200	51
US Top Country Albums (Billboard)	8

=== Year-end charts ===
Chart (2000)	Position
US Top Country Albums (Billboard)	73
Chart (2001)	Position
Canadian Country Albums (Nielsen SoundScan)	29
US Billboard 200	141
US Top Country Albums (Billboard)	14
Chart (2002)	Position
Canadian Country Albums (Nielsen SoundScan)	52
US Top Country Albums (Billboard)	22

== Certifications ==
Region	Certification	Certified units/sales
United States (RIAA)	Platinum	1,000,000^{^}
^{^} Shipments figures based on certification alone.
