= Theatre of the Unheard =

Studio album by Darrell Scott
- Released: 2003
- Genre: Country
- Length: 61:27
- Label: Full Light Records
- Producer: Darrell Scott

Darrell Scott chronology
Real Time (with Tim O'Brien) (2003)	Theatre of the Unheard (2003)	Live in NC (with Danny Thompson and Kenny Malone) (2005)

Professional ratings
Review scores
Source	Rating
AllMusic	3/5 stars

Theatre of the Unheard is the third solo album by American country musician Darrell Scott, released in 2003 by the Full Light label.

== Background and recording ==
While attending Tufts University in the 1980s, Scott produced a demo tape that made its way to Charles Koppelman of SBK Records and, eventually, Scott's first record contract. In 1991, under the direction of producer Norbert Putnam in Memphis, Tennessee, Scott recorded what would have been his debut studio album of 12 songs. The record label, not hearing any hits on the record, chose not to release it, which also prohibited Scott from recording any of the songs on the album for the next seven years.

12 years later, having relocated to Nashville, established himself as a session musician, and released two other solo albums, Scott oversaw the re-recording of the material from the unreleased album in his own living room, releasing it as Theatre of the Unheard.

== Critical reception ==
In his review for AllMusic, Ronnie D. Lankford, Jr., writes, "It's easy to lump Darrell Scott with other singer/songwriters. His songs certainly give the impression that he's writing out of personal experience, but his tendency to paint with large brush strokes gives his material universal appeal."

David Whiteis of The Chicago Reader writes, "His recent Theatre of the Unheard (Full Light) revisits a set of tunes he originally cut 12 years ago for a never-released album. In the interim Scott has changed his musical approach, abandoning the melange of honky-tonk tropes, rock rhythms, and jazz colorings on his early recordings for straight-ahead country-rock bombast."

In early 2005, the album was awarded Album of the Year in the 4th Annual Independent Music Awards.

== Track listing ==
All tracks are written by Darrell Scott, unless otherwise noted.

No.	Title	Writer(s)	Length
1.	"East of Gary"		4:32
2.	"Uncle Lloyd"		4:11
3.	"Day After Day"	Darrell Scott; Gordon Heins	6:11
4.	"6 O'Clock in the Morning"		4:07
5.	"Miracle of Living"		5:17
6.	"Full Light"		3:55
7.	"I Wanna Be Free"		4:07
8.	"River Take Me"		5:56
9.	"Alton Air" (instrumental)		5:36
10.	"The Man Who Could Have Played Bass for Shanana"		6:44
11.	"After All"		5:32
12.	"10,000 Miles Away"		5:19
Total length:			61:27

== Musicians ==
- Darrell Scott – Accordion (Track 12), Banjo (Track 5), Banjolin (Track 6), Bouzouki (Track 2, 4, 8), Dobro (Track 1), 12 String Acoustic Guitar (Track 9, 12), Acoustic Guitar (Track 1-3, 5-6, 10-11), Baritone Acoustic Guitar (Track 4), electric guitar (Track 1, 3-6, 8-9, 11-12), Electric Baritone Guitar (Track 2, 7), Mandolin (Track 1-2, 4, 6, 8-9), Pedal Steel (Track 3), Percussion (Track 8), piano (Track 3, 11), Electric Piano (Track 7, 12), 2nd Solo (Track 6), Solo (Track 12), Lead Vocals (Track 1-2, 4-8, 10-11, 12), Background Vocals (Track 7-8, 12), Weissenborn Slide (Track 11)
- Kathy Chiavola – Voice (Track 4)
- Jeff Coffin – Flute (Track 4), Baritone Sax (Track 5), Soprano Sax (Track 10), Tenor Sax (Track 11)
- Dan Dugmore – Guitar, Electric guitar (Track 2-3, 5, 7), Electric Rhythm Guitar (Track 8), Lap Steel Guitar (Track 5-6), Pedal Steel (Track 2, 9-11), Solo (Track 3, 5, 7, 10), 1st & 3rd Solo (Track 6)
- Stuart Duncan – Fiddle (Track 9)
- Jim Hoke – Horn (Track 7)
- Kenny Malone – Drums (Track 1-3, 5-8, 10-12), Percussion (Track 7, 9-11), Tambourine (Track 2), Spoken Word (Track 4), The Beast (Track 12)
- Jane Salters – Spoken Word (Track 4)
- Jonell Mosser – Voice of Sally (Track 7)
- Steve Nathan – Organ (Track 1, 4, 6-8, 10-12)
- Dirk Powell – Accordion (Track 8), Fiddle (Track 8), Yells (Track 8)
- Suzy Ragsdale – Voice (Track 3, 6-8, 10, 12), Voice of Myrrah (Track 11)
- John Cowan – Voice (Track 3, 7-8, 10, 12)
- Rodney Crowell – Voice (Track 2)
- Wayne Scott – Spoken Word Phone Message (Track 3)
- Danny Thompson – Double Bass (Track 1-5, 7, 9-12), Acoustic Bass (Track 6, 8), Vocal "Zock" (Track 5)
- Kris Wilkinson – Viola (Track 4, 11)
- Andrea Zonn – Violin (Track 4, 12)
- John Catchings – Cello (Track 4, 12)

== Production ==
- Darrell Scott – Producer, Audio Production, Engineer, Mixing, Liner Notes, Photography
- Richard Dodd – Mastering
- Miles Wilkinson – Audio Engineer, Engineer, Mixing
- Stacy Zaferes – Photography
- Sherie René Scott – Photography
- Señor McGuire – Photography
- Maude Gilman Clapham – Art Direction, Design
- Phil Carroll – Settings

Track information and credits adapted from AllMusic. and verified from the album's liner notes.
