= Life Happened =

Studio album by Tammy Cochran
- Released: October 15, 2002
- Genre: Country
- Length: 39:56
- Label: Epic Records
- Producer: Blake Chancey; Anthony Martin; Billy Joe Walker, Jr.

Tammy Cochran chronology
Tammy Cochran (2001)	Life Happened (2002)

Singles from Tammy Cochran
- 1. "Life Happened" Released: May 28, 2002; 2. "Love Won't Let Me" Released: December 2, 2002; 3. "What Kind of Woman Would I Be" Released: April 14, 2003

Life Happened is the second studio album by American country music artist Tammy Cochran. It was released on October 15, 2002 by Epic Records. It was peaked at number 11 on the Billboard Top Country Albums chart. The album includes the singles "Life Happened", "Love Won't Let Me" and "What Kind of Woman Would I Be".

== Track listing ==
Life Happened track listing
No.	Title	Writer(s)	Length
1.	"Love Won't Let Me"	Jason Deere; Franne Golde; Kasey Livingston	2:57
2.	"Wanted"	Al Anderson; Sharon Vaughn	2:35
3.	"Go Slow"	Tammy Cochran	3:28
4.	"What Kind of Woman Would I Be"	Angela Hurt; Kerry Kurt Phillips	3:26
5.	"White Lies and Picket Fences"	Jess Brown; Tony Lane; Tammy Powell	3:41
6.	"I'm Getting There"	Billy Crain; Adrienne Follesé	2:58
7.	"Life Happened"	Patrick Jason Matthews; Phillips	4:27
8.	"I Used to Be That Woman"	Cochran	3:04
9.	"Dead of the Night"	Cochran; Patricia Gray	3:46
10.	"All in How You Look at Things"	Cochran; Gray	3:24
11.	"If You Can"	Joy Swinea	3:35
Total length:			39:56

== Personnel ==
- Eddie Bayers – drums
- Richard Bennett – acoustic guitar
- Joe Chemay – bass guitar
- Lisa Cochran – background vocals
- Tammy Cochran – lead vocals
- Melodie Crittenden – background vocals
- Eric Darken – congas, tambourine, vibraphone
- Dan Dugmore – electric guitar, steel guitar
- Glen Duncan – fiddle, mandolin
- Paul Franklin – steel guitar
- Carl Gorodetzky – violin
- David Grissom – electric guitar
- Jim Grosjean – viola
- Tony Harrell – synthesizer
- Aubrey Haynie – fiddle
- Wes Hightower – background vocals
- John Barlow Jarvis – keyboards, Hammond organ, piano
- Randy Kohrs – Dobro
- Paul Leim – drums, percussion
- B. James Lowry – acoustic guitar
- Anthony Martin – background vocals
- Bob Mason – cello
- Brent Mason – electric guitar
- Steve Nathan – keyboards, piano
- Matt Rollings – piano
- Jason Sellers – background vocals
- Pam Sixfin – violin
- Bryan Sutton – acoustic guitar
- Russell Terrell – background vocals
- Neil Thrasher – background vocals
- Billy Joe Walker Jr. – acoustic guitar, electric guitar
- Biff Watson – acoustic guitar
- Dennis Wilson – background vocals
- Glenn Worf – bass guitar
- Curtis Young – background vocals
- Reggie Young – electric guitar

== Charts ==
Chart (2002)	Peak position
US Billboard 200	95
US Top Country Albums (Billboard)	11
