= Every Little Girl's Dream =

Studio album by Lisa Brokop
- Released: September 6, 1994
- Genre: Country
- Length: 35:42
- Label: Patriot/Liberty
- Producer: Jerry Crutchfield

Lisa Brokop chronology
My Love (1991)	Every Little Girl's Dream (1994)	Lisa Brokop (1996)

Every Little Girl's Dream is the second studio album by Canadian country music singer Lisa Brokop. It was released on September 6, 1994 by Patriot/Liberty. "Give Me a Ring Sometime," "Take That," "One of Those Nights" and "Who Needs You" were all released as singles. The album has been certified Gold in Canada by the CRIA for sales of 50,000 copies.

== Track listing ==
1. "Take That" (Gary Burr, Tom Shapiro) - 3:31
2. "One of Those Nights" (Conway Twitty, Troy Seals) - 3:34
3. "You Already Drove Me There" (Scott Edwards Phelps, Cyril Rawson) - 3:32
4. "Give Me a Ring Sometime" (Kris Bergsnes, Bob Moulds, Sharon Anderson) - 3:01
5. "Every Little Girl's Dream" (Dave Loggins, Kenny Mims) - 4:05
6. "Never Did Say Goodbye" (Jeff Black) - 4:18
7. "Who Needs You" (Skip Ewing, Mickey Cates) - 3:25
8. "Not Here in My Arms" (Paul Nelson, Gene Nelson) - 3:39
9. "Let Me Live Another Day" (Byron Hill, Wayne Tester) - 3:36
10. "Never Gonna Be Your Fool Again" (Danny Mayo, Dickey Lee, DeAnna Cox) - 3:01

== Personnel ==
Adapted from Every Little Girl's Dream liner notes.

Musicians

- Eddie Bayers - drums
- Gary Burr - background vocals
- Carol Chase - background vocals
- Dale Daniel - background vocals
- Paul Franklin - steel guitar
- Sonny Garrish - steel guitar
- Steve Gibson - acoustic guitar
- Greg Gordon - background vocals
- Dann Huff - electric guitar
- Mitch Humphreys - piano, synthesizer
- David Hungate - bass guitar
- John Barlow Jarvis - synthesizer
- Dirk Johnson - synthesizer
- Tom Roady - percussion
- Judy Rodman - background vocals
- Brent Rowan - electric guitar
- Reggie Young - electric guitar

Technical

- Jerry Crutchfield - producer
- Tim Kish - recording, overdubbing
- Lynn Peterzell - mixing
- Denny Purcell - mastering
- Craig White - recording, overdubbing
