= Gas and Time =

Studio album by Duane Steele
- Released: June 1, 2010
- Genre: Country
- Length: 34:23
- Label: Jolt
- Producer: Duane Steele

Duane Steele chronology
Ghost Town (2006)	Gas and Time (2010)	Dirt and Dreams (2015)

Gas and Time is the fifth studio album by Canadian country music artist Duane Steele. It was released by Jolt Records on June 1, 2010. Singles released from the album include "Farm Girl," "Blessed" and "Waste of Good Whisky."

== Track listing ==
1. "Way Too Long" – 3:27
2. "Bottle It" – 3:50
3. "Blessed" – 3:26
4. "Gas and Time" – 3:17
5. "Waste of Good Whisky" – 2:44
  - featuring Sean Hogan
6. "Farm Girl" – 2:55
7. "Long Road, Short Memory" – 4:06
8. "Country Singer" – 3:07
9. "Life's Railway to Heaven" – 3:56
10. "Hooked on Trains" – 3:35
