= Life Happened (song) =

Single by Tammy Cochran

from the album Life Happened
- Released: June 1, 2002
- Genre: Country
- Length: 4:27
- Label: Epic
- Songwriters: Kerry Kurt Phillips; Patrick Jason Matthews
- Producer: Billy Joe Walker Jr.

Tammy Cochran singles chronology
"I Cry" (2001)	"Life Happened" (2002)	"Love Won't Let Me" (2002)

"Life Happened" is a song written by Kerry Kurt Phillips and Patrick Jason Matthews, and recorded by American country music artist Tammy Cochran. It was released in June 2002 as the first single and title track from the album Life Happened. The song reached #20 on the Billboard Hot Country Singles & Tracks chart.

== Chart performance ==
Chart (2002)	Peak position
US Hot Country Songs (Billboard)	20
US Bubbling Under Hot 100 (Billboard)	17
