= This Is the Life (Duane Steele album) =

Studio album by Duane Steele
- Released: September 1997
- Genre: Country
- Label: Mercury
- Producer: Steve Bogard; Michael D. Clute

Duane Steele chronology
P.O. Box 423 (1996)	This Is the Life (1997)	I'll Be Alright (2000)

This Is the Life is the second studio album by Canadian country music artist Duane Steele. It was released by Mercury Records in September 1997. Included are the Top Ten singles "Tell the Girl" and "If I Could Just Get to You" and a cover of Gordon Lightfoot's "If You Could Read My Mind."

== Track listing ==
1. "Tell the Girl"
2. "Leavin' Made Easy"
3. "Little Black Dress"
4. "Let's Go for a Drive"
5. "This Is the Life"
6. "Little Cabin"
7. "Just Like Love"
8. "If You Could Read My Mind"
9. "If I Could Just Get to You"
10. "Keep the Change"
11. "The Meaning of Life"
12. "Right from the Start"
