= P.O. Box 423 =

Studio album by Duane Steele
- Released: February 1996
- Genre: Country
- Length: 44:52
- Label: Mercury
- Producer: Steve Bogard; Michael D. Clute

Duane Steele chronology
P.O. Box 423 (1996)	This Is the Life (1997)

P.O. Box 423 is the debut album by Canadian country music artist Duane Steele. It was released by Mercury Records in February 1996. The album peaked at number 32 on the RPM Country Albums chart.

== Track listing ==
1. "Stuck on Your Love" – 3:29
2. "The Trouble with Love" – 3:38
3. "Anita Got Married" – 3:27
4. "Lies" – 3:09
5. "Fire to the Devil" – 4:27
6. "Two Names On an Overpass" – 3:30
  - duet with Lisa Brokop
7. "Top Down in the Rain" – 4:03
8. "P.O. Box 423" – 4:52
9. "She's Tough" – 3:31
10. "One More Time" – 4:09
11. "Misery with a Beat" – 3:10
12. "Tender to the Touch" – 3:27

== Chart performance ==
Chart (1996)	Peak position
Canadian RPM Country Albums	32
