= Good Time (Niko Moon song) =

2020 song by Niko Moon

Single by Niko Moon

from the album Good Time
- Released: March 16, 2020
- Genre: Country hip hop
- Length: 3:35
- Label: RCA Nashville
- Songwriters: Niko Moon; Anna Moon; Jordan Minton; Joshua Murty; Mark Trussell
- Producers: Niko Moon; Joshua Murty

Niko Moon singles chronology
"Good Time" (2020)	"No Sad Songs" (2021)

Music video
- "Good Time" on YouTube

"Good Time" (stylized in all caps) is a song co-written and recorded by American singer and songwriter Niko Moon. It was released on July 19, 2019, and serviced to country radio on March 16, 2020, as the lead single from his debut album of the same name (2021). Originally writing the song to pitch to other country artists, Moon ended up keeping it for himself when working on his album. In March 2021, "Good Time" became Moon's first number-one hit on both the Billboard Country Airplay and Hot Country Songs charts. It also reached number 20 on the Hot 100. The song was certified 2× Platinum by the Recording Industry Association of America (RIAA), denoting sales of over two million units in that country. In Canada, the track reached the top 10 of the Canada Country chart and number 74 on the Canadian Hot 100. An accompanying music video for the song, directed by Moon, features a campfire party in the woods.

== Background ==
Moon co-wrote "Good Time" with his wife Anna Moon, Jordan Minton, Joshua Murty, and Mark Trussell. He originally wrote the song planning to pitch it to other country artists, but ultimately wound up keeping the song for himself when he began working on his album.

== Music video ==
The music video premiered on September 16, 2019, which was filmed in Nashville, Tennessee, and features his friends from Georgia partying around a campfire in the woods. Moon self-directed the video.

== Commercial performance ==
"Good Time" debuted at number 95 on the Billboard Hot 100 the week of October 10, 2020 before leaving the next week. Twenty-one weeks later, it peaked at number 20 the week of March 13, 2021, and stayed on the chart for twenty-five weeks. In Canada, the song debuted at number 81 on the Canadian Hot 100 the week of January 16, 2021 before leaving the next week. It peaked at number 74 the week of February 13, and remained on the chart for six weeks.

== Charts ==
=== Weekly charts ===
Chart (2020–2021)	Peak position
Canada Hot 100 (Billboard)	74
Canada Country (Billboard)	10
Global 200 (Billboard)	145
US Billboard Hot 100	20
US Adult Pop Airplay (Billboard)	38
US Country Airplay (Billboard)	1
US Hot Country Songs (Billboard)	1

=== Year-end charts ===
Chart (2020)	Position
US Hot Country Songs (Billboard)	65

Chart (2021)	Position
US Billboard Hot 100	84
US Country Airplay (Billboard)	34
US Hot Country Songs (Billboard)	20

== Certifications ==
Region	Certification	Certified units/sales
Canada (Music Canada)	2× Platinum	160,000^{‡}
United States (RIAA)	3× Platinum	3,000,000^{‡}
^{‡} Sales+streaming figures based on certification alone.

== Release history ==
Region	Date	Format
United States	July 19, 2019	Digital download; streaming
United States	March 16, 2020	Country radio
United States	February 22, 2021	Adult contemporary radio
