= One of These Nights (disambiguation) =

One of These Nights is a 1975 album by the rock band the Eagles.

One of These Nights may also refer to:

- "One of These Nights" (Eagles song), the title song from the album
- "One of These Nights" (Red Velvet song), 2016

== See also ==
- One of Those Nights (disambiguation)
