= The Trouble with Love =

Single by Duane Steele

from the album P.O. Box 423
- Released: 1996
- Genre: Country
- Length: 3:38
- Label: Mercury
- Songwriters: Hal Ketchum; Matraca Berg
- Producers: Steve Bogard; Michael D. Clute

Duane Steele singles chronology
"Anita Got Married" (1996)	"The Trouble with Love" (1996)	"She's Tough" (1996)

"The Trouble with Love" is a song recorded by Canadian country music artist Duane Steele. It was released in 1996 as the third single from his debut album, P.O. Box 423. It peaked at number 3 on the RPM Country Tracks chart in October 1996.

== Chart performance ==
Chart (1996)	Peak position
Canada Country Singles (RPM)	3

=== Year-end charts ===
Chart (1996)	Position
Canada Country Tracks (RPM)	14
