= Willi Carlisle =

American folk musician (born 1989)

- Performing in Somerville, MA, 2026

Background information
- Born: May 29, 1989 (age 37)
- Origin: Kansas, United States
- Genres: Folk; country
- Instruments: Guitar; banjo; fiddle; accordion; concertina; harmonica
- Years active: 2016–present
- Labels: Signature Sounds Recordings; Free Dirt Records
- Website: willicarlisle.com

Willi Carlisle (born May 29, 1989) is an American folk singer-songwriter from Kansas, based in Arkansas. His music pulls from traditional American folk music, punk music, and country music. Many of his songs contain themes of drug abuse, queer life, and rural American life.

== Early life ==
Carlisle grew up in a musical family, with his father being a polka musician. At an early age, he was introduced to American folk, bluegrass, and country music. He participated in school musicals and was a member of his school's choir. He also called square dances.

Carlisle attended the University of Arkansas in Fayetteville, Arkansas, earning an MFA degree in poetry, with the hope of learning to write better folk music. While in college, he realized a disconnect existed between contemporary poetry and regular people, spurring him to write music to bridge that gap.

== Discography ==
=== Albums ===
List of albums
Title	Release date	Label
To Tell You the Truth	May 11, 2018	Self-released
Peculiar, Missouri	July 12, 2022	Free Dirt Records
Critterland	January 25, 2024	Signature Sounds Recordings
The Magnolia Sessions	December 6, 2024	Anti-Corp
Winged Victory	June 27, 2025	Signature Sounds Recordings
The Universal Bubba	November 6, 2026	Signature Sounds Recordings

=== Singles and EPs ===
List of singles and EPs
Title	Release date	Label	Appears on
Too Nice to Mean Much	October 10, 2016	Self-released	
Boy Howdy, Hot Dog! (GemsOnVHS Field Recording)	March 11, 2022	GemsOnVHS	
Tulsa's Last Magician	March 29, 2022	Free Dirt Records	Peculiar, Missouri
Life on the Fence	May 16, 2022	Free Dirt Records	Peculiar, Missouri
Vanlife	June 14, 2022	Free Dirt Records	Peculiar, Missouri
All of the Redheaded Stranger	March 6, 2023	Self-released	
The Grand Design (GemsOnVHS Field Recording)	April 29, 2023	GemsOnVHS	
Angels (Western AF Version)	June 19, 2023	Western AF	
Willi Carlisle Western AF Field Recordings (Western AF Version)	August 31, 2023	Western AF	
Critterland	October 16, 2023	Signature Sounds Recordings	Critterland
When the Pills Wear Off	November 13, 2023	Signature Sounds Recordings	Critterland
Higher Lonesome	January 11, 2024	Signature Sounds Recordings	Critterland
Dry County Dust	January 22, 2024	Signature Sounds Recordings	Critterland
Penny Evans (Live)	August 13, 2024	Signature Sounds Recordings	Tales From Critterland (Live)
Tales from Critterland (Live)	August 16, 2024	Signature Sounds Recordings	
