= Tell the Girl =

Single by Duane Steele

from the album This Is the Life
- Released: 1997
- Genre: Country
- Label: Mercury
- Songwriters: Duane Steele; Jon Robbin
- Producers: Steve Bogard; Michael D. Clute

Duane Steele singles chronology
| "Two Names on an Overpass" (1997) | "Tell the Girl" (1997) | "If I Could Just Get to You" (1998) |

"Tell the Girl" is a song recorded by Canadian country music artist Duane Steele. It was released in 1997 as the first single from his second studio album, This Is the Life. It peaked at number 9 on the RPM Country Tracks chart in December 1997.

== Chart performance ==
| Chart (1997) | Peak position |
|---|---|
| Canada Country Singles (RPM) | 9 |
