= One of Those Nights: The Anthology =

Anthology

Compilation album by UFO
- Released: August 15, 2006
- Genre: Hard rock, Heavy metal
- Label: Castle

Professional ratings
Review scores
Source	Rating
Allmusic	3/5 stars

One of Those Nights: The Anthology is a greatest hits collection by UFO, released in 2006. It is a 2 disc album, with disc 2 featuring a collection of tracks performed live. This material basically consists of their three albums: High Stakes & Dangerous Men, Live in Texas, and half of the tracks from Lights Out in Tokyo.

== Track listing ==
=== Disc one ===
1. "Borderline" – 5:20
2. "Primed for Time" – 3:24
3. "She's the One" – 3:46
4. "Ain't Life Sweet" – 3:44
5. "Don't Want to Lose You" – 5:38
6. "Burnin' Fire" – 4:04
7. "Running Up the Highway" – 4:41
8. "Back Door Man" – 5:08
9. "One of Those Nights" – 4:12
10. "Revolution" – 4:08
11. "Love Deadly Love – 4:55
12. "Let the Good Times Roll" – 4:16
13. "Long Gone" (Re-recorded Single B-Side) – 4:52

=== Disc two ===
1. "Electric Phase" (Live) – 3:07
2. "Hot N' Ready" (Live) – 4:06
3. "Pack It Up and Go" (Live) – 3:24
4. "Cherry" (Live) – 4:15
5. "Out in the Street" (Live) – 5:46
6. "Let It Roll" (Live) – 5:05
7. "Too Hot to Handle" (Live) – 4:47
8. "Borderline" (Live) – 5:35
9. "She's the One" (Live) – 3:25
10. "Back Door Man" (Live) – 5:24
11. "Love to Love" (Live) – 8:12
12. "Only You Can Rock Me" (Live) – 4:08
13. "Lights Out" (Live) – 6:32
14. "Doctor Doctor" (Live) – 8:17
15. "Shoot Shoot" (Live) – 4:41
