= Lisa Brokop (album) =

Studio album by Lisa Brokop
- Released: February 20, 1996
- Genre: Country
- Length: 33:50
- Label: Capitol Nashville
- Producer: Jerry Crutchfield; Josh Leo

Lisa Brokop chronology
Every Little Girl's Dream (1994)	Lisa Brokop (1996)	When You Get to Be You (1998)

Lisa Brokop is the self-titled third studio album by Canadian country music artist Lisa Brokop. It was released on February 20, 1996, by Capitol Nashville. "She Can't Save Him," "Before He Kissed Me" and "West of Crazy" were all released as singles. Reba McEntire and Trisha Yearwood covered "She Can't Save Him" on McEntire's 2007 album Reba: Duets.

Tracks 1, 3, 7, 8, and 10 were produced by Jerry Crutchfield, while tracks 2, 4, 5, 6, and 9 were produced by Josh Leo.

== Track listing ==
1. "Language of Love" (Bobby Carmichael, Kostas) - 3:16
2. "Before He Kissed Me" (Liz Hengber, Mark Irwin) - 2:21
3. "She Can't Save Him" (Hengber, Bob Regan) - 3:01
4. "I Know a Heartache When I See One" (Charlie Black, Rory Michael Bourke, Kerry Chater) - 3:45
5. "Now That We're Not a Family" (Phil Dillon) - 4:25
6. "West of Crazy" (Gary Burr, Vince Melamed) - 3:32
7. "I Know Too Much" (Suzi Ragsdale, Verlon Thompson) - 3:28
8. "At the End of the Day" (Billy Kirsch, Steve Wariner) - 3:35
9. "That Summer" (Phil Barnhart, Sam Hogin, Sunny Russ) - 3:14
10. "From the Heart" (Lisa Brokop, Tom McKillip) - 3:13

== Personnel ==
=== Tracks 1, 3, 7, 8, 10 ===
- Eddie Bayers – drums
- Stephanie Bentley – background vocals
- Lisa Brokop – lead vocals, background vocals
- Gary Burr – background vocals
- Mark Casstevens – acoustic guitar
- Martin Crutchfield – acoustic guitar, electric guitar
- Paul Franklin – steel guitar
- Sonny Garrish – steel guitar
- Sarah Hooker – background vocals
- Dann Huff – electric guitar
- David Hungate – bass guitar
- Steve Gibson – acoustic guitar
- Jim Horn – saxophone
- Mitch Humphrey – keyboards
- Carl Marsh – keyboards
- Steve Nathan – piano
- Brent Rowan – electric guitar
- Steve Wariner – electric guitar, background vocals
- Willie Weeks – bass guitar
- Reggie Young – electric guitar

Keyboard and string arrangements on "At the End of the Day" by Carl Marsh.

=== Tracks 2, 4, 5, 6, 9 ===
- Lisa Brokop – lead vocals
- Dan Dugmore – steel guitar
- Kenny Edwards – background vocals
- Andrew Gold – background vocals
- Dann Huff – electric guitar
- David Hungate – bass guitar
- Paul Mascioli – percussion on "Now That We're Not a Family"
- Steve Nathan – keyboards
- Dawn Sears – background vocals
- Harry Stinson – background vocals
- Wendy Waldman – background vocals
- Biff Watson – acoustic guitar
- Lonnie Wilson – drums

== Chart performance ==
Chart (1996)	Peak position
Canadian RPM Country Albums	18
U.S. Billboard Top Country Albums	74
