= Anita Got Married =

Single by Duane Steele

from the album P.O. Box 423
- Released: 1996
- Genre: Country
- Length: 3:27
- Label: Mercury
- Songwriters: Michael Clark; Jeff Stevens
- Producers: Michael D. Clute; Steve Bogard

Duane Steele singles chronology
"Stuck on Your Love" (1996)	"Anita Got Married" (1996)	"The Trouble with Love" (1996)

"Anita Got Married" is a single by Canadian country music artist Duane Steele. Released in 1996, it was the second single from his album P.O. Box 423. The song reached number one on the RPM Country Tracks chart in Canada in July 1996.

== Chart performance ==
Chart (1996)	Peak position
Canada Country Singles (RPM)	1

=== Year-end charts ===
Chart (1996)	Position
Canada Country Tracks (RPM)	21
