= She's Tough =

Single by Duane Steele

from the album P.O. Box 423
- Released: 1996
- Genre: Country
- Length: 3:31
- Label: Mercury
- Songwriters: Steve Bogard; Jeff Stevens
- Producers: Steve Bogard; Michael D. Clute

Duane Steele singles chronology
"The Trouble with Love" (1996)	"She's Tough" (1996)	"Two Names on an Overpass" (1997)

"She's Tough" is a song recorded by Canadian country music artist Duane Steele. It was released in 1996 as the fourth single from his debut album, P.O. Box 423. It peaked at number 10 on the RPM Country Tracks chart in February 1997.

== Chart performance ==
Chart (1996–1997)	Peak position
Canada Country Singles (RPM)	10

=== Year-end charts ===
Chart (1997)	Position
Canada Country Tracks (RPM)	80
