= Give Me a Ring Sometime (song) =

Single by Lisa Brokop

from the album Every Little Girl's Dream
- B-side: "Let Me Live Another Day"
- Released: June 1994
- Genre: Country
- Length: 3:01
- Label: Patriot Records
- Songwriters: Sharon Anderson, Kris Bergsnes, Bob Moulds
- Producer: Jerry Crutchfield

Lisa Brokop singles chronology
"Stand by Your Man" (1994)	"Give Me a Ring Sometime" (1994)	"Take That" (1994)

"Give Me a Ring Sometime" is a song written by Sharon Anderson, Kris Bergsnes, and Bob Moulds. It was recorded by Canadian country music singer Lisa Brokop for her 1994 album, Every Little Girl's Dream, from which it was issued as the album's first single. The song became a top twenty hit on the Canadian RPM Country Tracks.

The song's co-writer, Sharon Anderson, recorded her own version of the song, as "Gimme a Ring Sometime," in 1995. Anderson's version is found on her second album, Bringing It Home.

While the song failed to reach the top 40 in the United States, Brokop received a nomination for Top New Female Vocalist at the 1995 Academy of Country Music awards.

== Chart performance ==
The song debuted at number 86 on the Canadian RPM Country Tracks on the chart dated July 18, 1994 and spent nine weeks on the chart before peaking at number 12 on September 12, 1994.

Chart (1994)	Peak position
Canada Country Singles (RPM)	12
US Hot Country Songs (Billboard)	52
