= Darrell Scott =

American musician and singer-songwriter

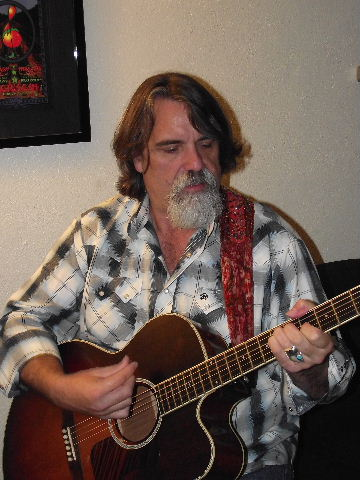
- Darrell Scott at the Cactus Cafe in Austin, Texas. Photo by Ron Baker (2011).

Background information
- Born: August 6, 1959 (age 66); London, Kentucky, United States
- Origin: Nashville, Tennessee, United States
- Genres: Country
- Occupation: Singer-songwriter
- Instruments: Vocals, guitar, mandolin
- Years active: 1990s–present
- Labels: Sugar Hill, Full Light
- Website: darrellscott.com

James Darrell Scott (born August 6, 1959) is an American singer-songwriter, multi-instrumentalist, and producer. He has written several mainstream country hits, and is well-established as one of Nashville's premier session instrumentalists.

== Biography ==
=== Early life and career ===
Scott was born in London, Kentucky, and at an early age his family moved to East Gary, Indiana, where his father Wayne worked in a steel mill. Scott's father was also a musician and songwriter who encouraged Darrell and his brothers Denny, Dale, Don, and David to play instruments in the family band at schools and church events. In 1971 the Scott family moved to San Bernardino, California and started a business erecting chain-link fencing and playing California honky-tonks as Wayne Scott and Harlan County. At age 16 Darrell completed high school via the California equivalency exam and left the family band in favor of playing professionally in dance bands and country music groups, eventually playing five nights a week as a member of a house band at a San Bernardino bar called the Brandin' Iron.

In 1980 he began traveling north from gig to gig while living in a van, eventually ending up in Stratford, Ontario, where he performed as a one-man band before auditioning and being hired to play with the Mercey Brothers. Scott wrote two songs that were included on a Mercey Brothers album, with one being released as a single, and Scott signed a music publishing deal, but didn't like writing the style of songs he was playing with the Mercey Brothers. In 1983, with a renewed interest in pursuing a college education, Scott moved to Bedford, Massachusetts and attended Middlesex Community College for two years before enrolling at Tufts University. Scott saw a volume of poetry by Tufts artist-in-residence Philip Levine and was inspired to enroll in classes taught by Levine. With Levine's guidance, Scott wrote the song "Uncle Lloyd". Having found his writer's voice, Scott had soon produced a demo tape that made its way to Charles Koppelman of SBK records and, eventually, a record contract. Scott recorded an album of 12 songs in Memphis with producer Norbert Putnam but the label, not hearing any obvious hit singles on the record, chose not to release it, which also prohibited Scott from recording any of the songs on the album for the next seven years.

=== Move to Nashville and breakthrough ===
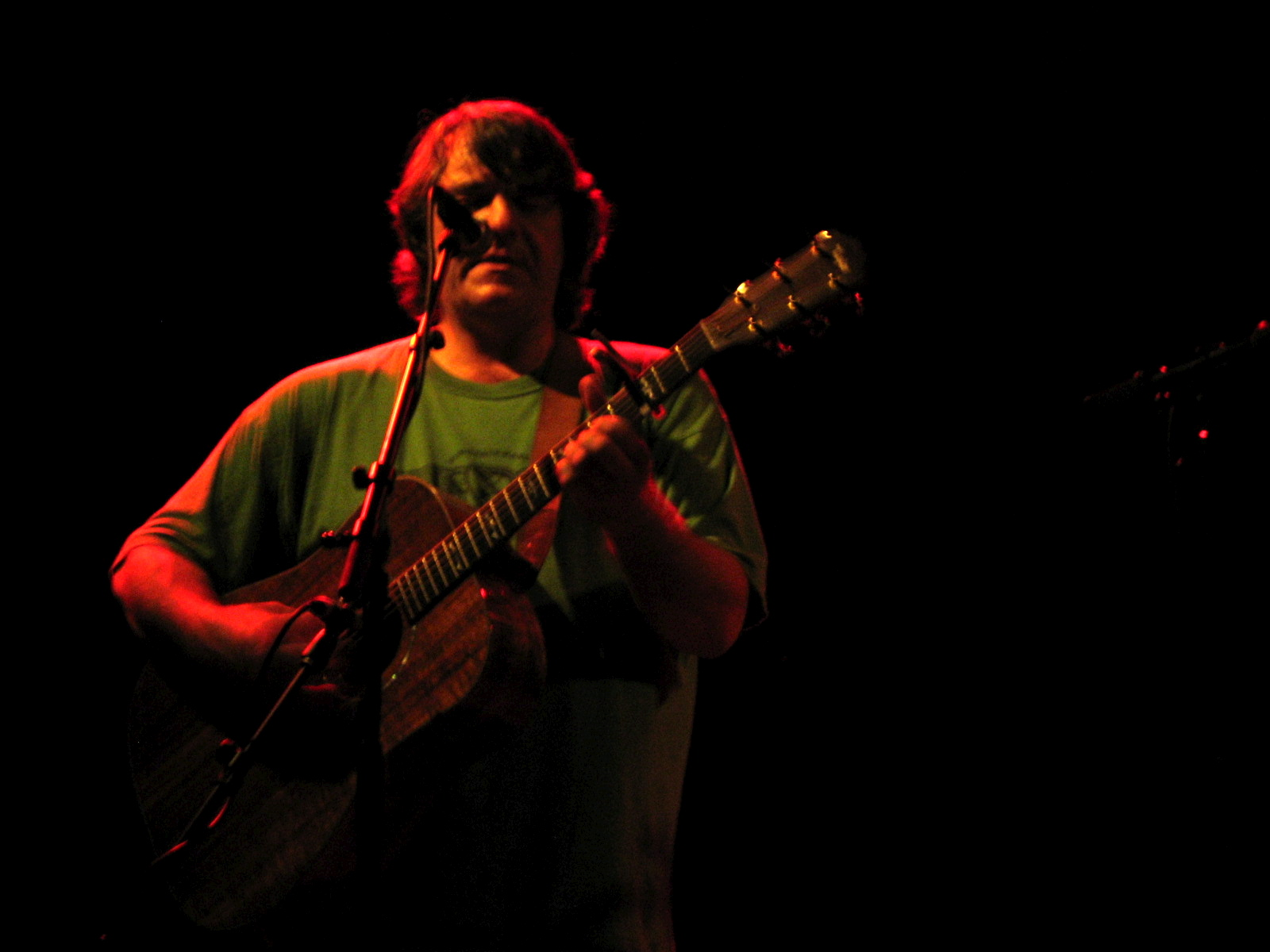
Darrell Scott (2008)

In 1992 Scott moved to Nashville, Tennessee, where he began working as a session musician, landing work with Guy Clark the following year. More session work followed, as well as a new publishing contract. He self-produced another album, Aloha from Nashville (1996), which was picked up for distribution by Sugar Hill Records. The same year, Suzy Bogguss' recording of the Scott-penned song "No Way Out" made it onto the country singles chart. The following year, Garth Brooks' version of "When There's No One Around", co-written by Scott and Tim O'Brien, was included on Brooks' #1 album Sevens.

In 1999 Scott released his second album, Family Tree. He collaborated with O'Brien to release their first album as a duo, Real Time (2000), and the song "The Second Mouse" from that album being nominated for the 2001 Grammy Award for Best Country Instrumental Performance.

In 2000, Sara Evans had a hit with "Born to Fly", co-written with Scott. Meanwhile, more of Scott's songs were being recorded by other artists. The Dixie Chicks recorded Scott's song "Heartbreak Town" for inclusion on their 1999 album Fly, and released the song as the album's 7th single in June 2001. Travis Tritt's version of "It's a Great Day to Be Alive", released in December 2000, achieved a new level of commercial success for one of Scott's songs, reaching number 2 on the Billboard Hot Country Songs chart and at number 33 on the Billboard Hot 100 chart. Patty Loveless recorded "You'll Never Leave Harlan Alive" for her 2001 album Mountain Soul, featuring Scott playing banjo. Loveless' rendition was nominated for the 2002 International Bluegrass Music Awards Song of the Year. The song has subsequently been covered by Brad Paisley, Kathy Mattea, Montgomery Gentry and others. The Dixie Chicks recorded another of Scott's songs, "Long Time Gone". Released as the lead single from their 2002 album Home, the Dixie Chicks' version reached a peak of number 2 on the Billboard Hot Country Songs chart and number 7 on the Billboard Hot 100 chart, and won a Grammy Award for Best Country Vocal Performance by a Duo or Group.

In 2001, Scott was named Songwriter of the Year by the Nashville Songwriters Association International, and received the same honor from ASCAP the following year. In 2003 he launched his own label, Full Light Records, and revisited and re-recorded the songs from his unreleased debut album, releasing them as Theatre of the Unheard. In early 2005, the album won the 4th Annual Independent Music Awards Album of the Year. That same year, Scott produced his father Wayne's debut album, This Weary Way, featuring Darrell's longtime collaborators O'Brien, Dan Dugmore, Casey Driessen, Suzi Ragsdale, and Verlon Thompson, as well as a duet with Guy Clark.

In 2006 he released The Invisible Man, with the song "Hank Williams' Ghost" from that album awarded the 2007 Song of the Year by the Americana Music Association. In 2008, he released Modern Hymns, an album of twelve of Scott's favorite songs by twelve favorite songwriters recorded live with engineer Gary Paczosa in Blackbird Studio C.

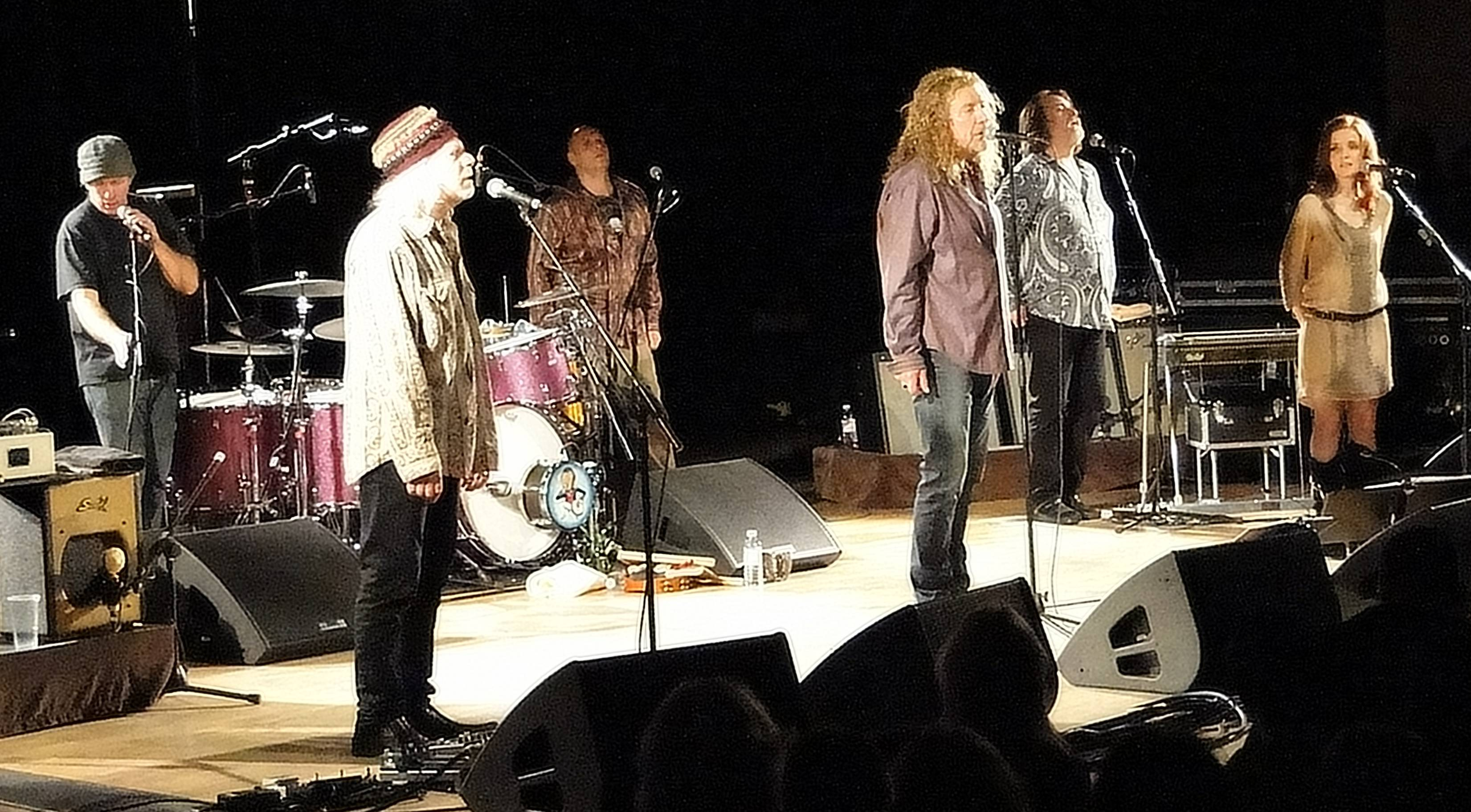
Scott (second-right) with Band of Joy at Birmingham Symphony Hall, October 27, 2010

Scott has collaborated with Steve Earle, Sam Bush, Emmylou Harris, John Cowan, Kate Rusby, Jimmie Dale Gilmore, Mary Gauthier, Dan Tyminski, and many others. He tours regularly with his own band and as a member of Steve Earle's Bluegrass Dukes. In 2010, Scott was announced as part of the Band of Joy, performing alongside Robert Plant, credited with vocals, mandolin, guitar, accordion, pedal, lap steel and banjo.

His album, Crooked Road, was released May 25, 2010. In January 2011 Crooked Road won the award for the Country Album category from The 10th Annual Independent Music Awards.

In 2010, Brad Paisley's cover of "You'll Never Leave Harlan Alive" was played during the final scene of the season one finale of the TV drama Justified, and different versions of the song were used for the second, fourth, and fifth-season finales, with the original recording by Darrell Scott himself used for the series finale.

On November 2, 2016, at the 50th Annual Country Music Association Awards, Beyoncé performed a remix of her song "Daddy Lessons" together with the Dixie Chicks, including excerpts from their version of Scott's song "Long Time Gone". A studio version was released after the performance.

In August 2023, the Darrell Scott String Band, a group consisting of Scott and longtime fellow musicians Matt Flinner, Bryn Davies, Shad Cobb, John Cowan, and Daniel de los Reyes, released Old Cane Back Rocker, a studio string band music album of original and cover songs. He produced Steep Canyon Rangers' album Morning Shift (2023), and Willi Carlisle's Critterland (2024).

On September 10, 2025, Scott was presented with the Lifetime Achievement Award at the 2025 Americana Music Honors & Awards.

== Songs by Darrell Scott covered by other musicians ==
- "It's a Great Day to Be Alive" – Travis Tritt, Cory Morrow
- "You'll Never Leave Harlan Alive" – Montgomery Gentry, Brad Paisley, Patty Loveless, Kathy Mattea, Murder By Death (band), Red Molly, Dave Alvin, Ruby Friedman Orchestra, Maxida Märak, Jonah Michea Judy, and Downhill Bluegrass Band
- "Long Time Gone" – The Chicks
- "We've Got Nothing But Love to Prove" – Faith Hill
- "Proving You Wrong" – Keb' Mo'
- "Out In The Parking Lot" – Guy Clark, Brad Paisley with Alan Jackson
- "River Take Me" – Montgomery Gentry, Sam Bush
- "Heartbreak Town" – The Chicks
- "Head South" – Robinella
- "Family Tree" – Darryl Worley
- "With A Memory Like Mine" – John Cowan, Mountain Heart
- "Love's Not Through With Me Yet" – Johnsmith
- "Daddy Lessons" – Beyoncé (remix with The Chicks sampled Long Time Gone)
- "It's Another Day" - Tim O'Brien on Traveler
- "Uncle Lloyd" - The Steel Woods
- "Old Town New" - Tim McGraw

== Singles composed with others ==
- "Born to Fly" – Sara Evans

== Discography ==
Year	Title	Label	Peak chart positions			
Year	Title	Label	US Country	US Heat	US Folk	US Grass
1997	Aloha From Nashville	JustUs	—	—	—	—
1999	Family Tree	Sugar Hill	—	—	—	—
2000	Real Time (with Tim O'Brien)	Full Light	—	—	—	—
2003	Theatre of the Unheard	Full Light	—	—	—	—
2004	Live in NC (with Danny Thompson and Kenny Malone)	Full Light	—	—	—	—
2006	The Invisible Man	Full Light	—	—	—	—
2008	Modern Hymns	Appleseed	—	—	—	—
2010	A Crooked Road	Full Light	—	32	13	—
2012	Long Ride Home	Full Light	55	22	14	—
2012	Live: We're Usually a Lot Better Than This (with Tim O'Brien)	Full Light	64	35	—	3
2013	Memories and Moments (with Tim O'Brien)	Full Skies	36	9	13	2
2015	Ten: Songs of Ben Bullington	Full Light	—	—	—	—
2016	Couchville Sessions	Full Light	41	24	21	—
2020	Sings the Blues of Hank Williams	Full Light	—	—	—	—
2023	Old Cane Back Rocker (as Darrell Scott String Band)	—	—	—	—	
"—" denotes releases that did not chart

== Awards ==
Awards
Preceded by James McMurtry	AMA Song of the Year (Songwriter); 2007	Succeeded by Hayes Carll & Brian Keane
