= When You Get to Be You =

Studio album by Lisa Brokop
- Released: July 21, 1998
- Genre: Country
- Length: 33:45
- Label: Columbia
- Producers: Dann Huff; Paul Worley

Lisa Brokop chronology
Lisa Brokop (1996)	When You Get to Be You (1998)	Undeniable (2000)

When You Get to Be You is the fourth studio album by Canadian country music singer-songwriter Lisa Brokop. It was released on July 21, 1998, by Columbia Records. "How Do I Let Go," "What's Not to Love," "When You Get to Be You," "Ain't Enough Roses," "Better Off Broken" and "Cool Summer Night" were all released as singles. The title track was previously released on Chris Ward's 1996 album One Step Beyond, which Dann Huff also co-produced.

== Track listing ==
1. "When You Get to Be You" (Curtis Wright, Dennis Robbins, Michael Dean Ehmig) – 3:10
2. "How Do I Let Go" (Karen Taylor-Good, Lisa Brokop) – 3:40
3. "Better Off Broken" (Brokop, Ron Harbin, Cyril Rawson) – 3:16
4. "What's Not to Love" (Brokop, Rawson, Harbin) – 2:58
5. "Cool Summer Night" (Brokop, Rawson, Harbin) – 3:49
6. "Rain on the River" (Brokop, Sam Hogin, Bob Regan) – 3:31
7. "Heart Be Still" (Brokop, Ed Hill, Hogin) – 3:22
8. "Love Is" (Stephony Smith, Robert Arthur, Melodie Crittenden) – 3:10
9. "Ain't Enough Roses" (Brokop, Hogin, Regan) – 2:47
10. "Land of a Thousand Dances" (Brokop, Marcus Hummon, Wayne Tester) – 4:02

== Chart performance ==
Chart (1998)	Peak position
Canadian RPM Country Albums	21
