= If I Could Just Get to You =

Single by Duane Steele

from the album This Is the Life
- Released: 1998
- Genre: Country
- Label: Mercury
- Songwriters: Duane Steele; Jon Robbin
- Producers: Steve Bogard; Michael D. Clute

Duane Steele singles chronology
"Tell the Girl" (1997)	"If I Could Just Get to You" (1998)	"If You Could Read My Mind" (1998)

"If I Could Just Get to You" is a song recorded by Canadian country music artist Duane Steele. It was released in 1998 as the second single from his second studio album, This Is the Life. It peaked at number 10 on the RPM Country Tracks chart in April 1998.

== Chart performance ==
Chart (1998)	Peak position
Canada Country Singles (RPM)	10

=== Year-end charts ===
Chart (1998)	Position
Canada Country Tracks (RPM)	88
