= Stuck on Your Love =

Single by Duane Steele

from the album P.O. Box 423
- Released: 1996
- Genre: Country
- Length: 3:29
- Label: Mercury
- Songwriters: Rick Giles; Steve Bogard
- Producers: Steve Bogard; Michael D. Clute

Duane Steele singles chronology
"Stuck on Your Love" (1996)	"Anita Got Married" (1996)

"Stuck on Your Love" is a song recorded by Canadian country music artist Duane Steele. It was released in 1996 as the first single from his debut album, P.O. Box 423. It peaked at number 2 on the RPM Country Tracks chart in March 1996.

== Chart performance ==
Chart (1996)	Peak position
Canada Country Singles (RPM)	2

=== Year-end charts ===
Chart (1996)	Position
Canada Country Tracks (RPM)	19
