= I'll Be Alright (album) =

Studio album by Duane Steele
- Released: August 2000
- Genre: Country
- Length: 33:58
- Label: Jolt/Royalty
- Producer: Louis Sedmak

Duane Steele chronology
This Is the Life (1997)	I'll Be Alright (2000)	Set List (2004)

I'll Be Alright is the third studio album by Canadian country music artist Duane Steele. It was released by Jolt/Royalty Records in August 2000. Singles released from the album include "Make Me Crazy," the title track, "The Goodside of Your Goodbye," "What to Do," "This Is Love," "I-65" and "The Heart of the It Don't Matter."

== Track listing ==
1. "The Heart of the It Don't Matter" (Don Bell, Jan Robbin, Duane Steele) – 3:08
2. "Lost in You" (Louis Sedmak, Steele) – 2:50
3. "I'll Be Alright" (Roy Hurd, Steele) – 4:09
4. "Make Me Crazy" (Jon Robbin, Steele) – 2:47
5. "This Is Love" (Steele, Tim Taylor) – 3:00
6. "The Goodside of Your Goodbye" (Tara Johns, Sedmak, Steele) – 3:19
7. "I-65" (Robbin, Steele) – 3:43
8. "Who Am I Gonna Love" (Robbin, Steele) – 3:28
9. "What to Do" (Robbin, Steele) – 3:14
10. "Johnny's Dream" (Sedmak, Steele) – 4:20
