= Tammy Cochran =

American country music singer-songwriter (born 1972)

- Born: January 30, 1972 (age 54)
- Origin: Austinburg, Ohio
- Genres: Country
- Occupation: Singer-songwriter
- Instrument: Vocals
- Years active: 2000–present
- Labels: Epic; Shanachie

Tammy Cochran (born January 30, 1972) is an American country music artist. Signed to Epic Records Nashville in 2000, she released her self titled debut album in 2001, followed a year later by Life Happened. These two albums produced a total of six chart singles for her on the Billboard country charts between 2000 and 2003, of which the highest-charting was "Angels in Waiting" at No. 9. A third album, Where I Am, followed in 2007.

== Biography ==
Tammy was born and raised in Austinburg, Ohio.

She was born in 1972 to Mabel and Delmar Cochran and was the third of three children. Growing up, she listened to recordings from Loretta Lynn and Barbara Mandrell. Tammy sang at her family's local church, and then she entered a talent show contest and won. She joined a couple of bands before making her own band called "TC Country" that played at fairs and weddings.

Cochran finished high school and took vocational training to become a secretary. She then moved to Nashville, Tennessee, in 1991. She married in 1996 but divorced soon afterward.

== Musical career ==
In 1998, Cochran met Shane Decker, a songwriter for Warner Bros. Records. He offered his help on making demos to send to record companies after seeing Cochran. He also helped her get a job as a songwriter for Warner Chappell. Her demo tapes were sent to Epic Records. She released her first single in 2000 called "If You Can", followed by "So What". Although neither single made Top 40 on the country charts, the third single ("Angels in Waiting", written about her brothers) peaked at No. 9, and its success led to the release of her self-titled debut album in 2001. The video for "Angels in Waiting" won a Christian Country Music Award for 'Video of the Year'. This album's fourth single, "I Cry", reached Top 20 as well.

Cochran's second album for Epic, Life Happened, was released a year later. The lead-off single reached Top 20, while "Love Won't Let Me", the follow-up, peaked at No. 31 and Cochran was dropped from Epic in 2003. Her third album, Where I Am, was issued on the independent Shanachie Records in 2007.

In 2014 she starred in a musical show titled "One" at the Alabama Theatre in Myrtle Beach, South Carolina.

== Discography ==
=== Studio albums ===
Title	Album details	Peak chart positions		
Title	Album details	US Country	US	US Heat
Tammy Cochran	Release date: May 1, 2001; Label: Epic Nashville	27	—	13
Life Happened	Release date: October 15, 2002; Label: Epic Nashville	11	95	—
Where I Am	Release date: July 31, 2007; Label: Shanachie Records	—	—	—
30 Something and Single	Release date: June 9, 2009; Label: IBI Records	—	—	—
"—" denotes releases that did not chart

=== Singles ===
Year	Single	Peak chart positions		Album
Year	Single	US Country	US	Album
2000	"If You Can"	41	—	Tammy Cochran
2000	"So What"	51	—	Tammy Cochran
2001	"Angels in Waiting"	9	73	Tammy Cochran
2001	"I Cry"	18	— (Note: "I Cry" did not enter the Hot 100, but peaked at number 7 on Bubbling Under Hot 100 Singles, which acts as a 25-song extension of the Hot 100.)	Tammy Cochran
2002	"Life Happened"	20	— (Note: "Life Happened" did not enter the Hot 100, but peaked at number 17 on Bubbling Under Hot 100 Singles, which acts as a 25-song extension of the Hot 100.)	Life Happened
2002	"Love Won't Let Me"	31	—	Life Happened
2003	"What Kind of Woman Would I Be"	—	—	Life Happened
2007	"The Ride of Your Life"	—	—	Where I Am
2007	"Where I Am"	—	—	Where I Am
2010	"He Really Thinks He's Got It"	—	—	30 Something and Single
"—" denotes releases that did not chart

=== Music videos ===
Year	Video	Director
2000	"If You Can"	Adolfo Doring
2000	"So What"	Trey Fanjoy
2001	"Angels in Waiting"	Deb Haus/Tammy Cochran
2001	"I Cry"	Trey Fanjoy
2002	"Life Happened"	Peter Zavadil

== Awards and nominations ==
=== Academy of Country Music Awards ===
Year	Nominee / work	Award	Result
2001	Tammy Cochran	Top New Female Vocalist	Nominated
2002	Tammy Cochran	Top New Female Vocalist	Nominated
2002	"Angels in Waiting"	Song of the Year	Nominated
2002	"Angels in Waiting"	Video of the Year	Nominated
