= It's a Great Day to Be Alive =

2000 single by Travis Tritt

"It's a Great Day to Be Alive" is a song written by Darrell Scott and included on his 1997 album Aloha from Nashville. The song was later made popular by Travis Tritt, whose version, released in December 2000 as the second single from his album Down the Road I Go, peaked at number 2 on the U.S. Billboard Hot Country Singles & Tracks chart and at number 33 on the U.S. Billboard Hot 100 chart.

== Inspiration and early versions ==
The inspiration for the song came after Scott had injured his back and was unable to do anything but lie on his back for a week. When he was finally able to sit up again and prepare some food for himself, he came to the realization that "it was the most blessed thing to do such simple things."

The song was originally recorded by American country music artist Jon Randall, whose version was to have been included on an album titled Great Day to Be Alive, which would have been released in the late 1990s via BNA Records. Randall's album remains unreleased.

The song was also recorded in the mid-1990s by The Sky Kings, an American country-rock supergroup consisting of Bill Lloyd, Rusty Young, and John Cowan. This version was unreleased until Rhino Handmade released the compilation From Out Of The Blue in 2000.

Scott also released his own version of the song on his 1997 album, Aloha From Nashville.

== Travis Tritt version ==
"It's a Great Day to Be Alive"

Single by Travis Tritt

from the album Down the Road I Go
- B-side: "Best of Intentions"
- Released: December 18, 2000
- Recorded: 1999–2000
- Genre: Country
- Length: 4:01
- Label: Columbia Nashville
- Songwriter: Darrell Scott
- Producers: Travis Tritt; Billy Joe Walker Jr.

Travis Tritt singles chronology
"Best of Intentions" (2000)	"It's a Great Day to Be Alive" (2000)	"Love of a Woman" (2001)

Travis Tritt recorded the song and included it as the fourth track on his 2000 album Down the Road I Go. Released in December as the album's second single, "It's a Great Day to Be Alive" peaked at number 2 on the U.S. Billboard Hot Country Singles & Tracks chart and at number 33 on the U.S. Billboard Hot 100 chart.

=== Critical reception ===
Deborah Evans Price, of Billboard magazine in her review of the album, called the song a "what-the-hell anthem" and a "sunny single."

=== Music video ===
The music video is a live performance directed by Jon Small, and begins with Travis Tritt performing the end of his 1992 cover of Elvis Presley's 1975 hit "T-R-O-U-B-L-E". It shows him performing the song to a packed crowd, with occasional cut-aways to Travis performing some of his daily routines (such as riding horseback and cruising on his Harley Davidson motorcycle.) It ends with the crowd singing the song's hook back to him, which he applauds. It was released in early January 2001. The video was recorded at the Historic Tennessee Theatre in Knoxville, Tennessee.

== Chart positions ==
"It's a Great Day to Be Alive" debuted at number 59 on the U.S. Billboard Hot Country Singles & Tracks for the week of December 16, 2000.

=== Weekly charts ===
Chart (2000–2001)	Peak position
US Hot Country Songs (Billboard)	2
US Billboard Hot 100	33

=== Year-end charts ===
Chart (2001)	Position
US Country Songs (Billboard)	2
US Billboard Hot 100	88

== Darrell Scott 2019 version ==
In 2019, after learning that Honeysuckle Hill Farms in Nashville was planning to incorporate an image of Scott and the song's title into a corn maze, Scott recorded a new bluegrass version of the song and a corresponding music video.

== Covers ==
- Pat Green and Cory Morrow covered the song on their March 2001 album Songs We Wish We'd Written.
- Niko Moon covered the song on his debut album Good Time (2021).

== Parodies ==
- American country music parody artist Cledus T. Judd released a parody of the song, titled "It's A Great Day to Be a Guy" on his 2002 album Cledus Envy.
