= Angels in Waiting =

Single by Tammy Cochran

from the album Tammy Cochran
- Released: March 19, 2001
- Genre: Country
- Length: 3:37
- Label: Epic
- Songwriters: Tammy Cochran, Stewart Harris, Jim McBride
- Producer: Blake Chancey

Tammy Cochran singles chronology
"So What" (2000)	"Angels in Waiting" (2001)	"I Cry" (2001)

"Angels in Waiting" is a song co-written and recorded by American country music singer Tammy Cochran. It was released in March 2001 as the third single from her self-titled album. The song peaked at number 9 on the Hot Country Singles & Tracks (now Hot Country Songs) chart and peaked at number 73 on the U.S. Billboard Hot 100.

== Content ==
It was her most successful single and the only one to reach the top 10 on the U.S. country charts. Cochran dedicated the song to her two older brothers, Shawn and Alan, who both died from cystic fibrosis. Shawn died from the disease in 1980 at age 14 and Alan died in 1991 at age 23. Cochran wrote this song along with Stewart Harris and Jim McBride.

== Chart performance ==
"Angels in Waiting" debuted at number 56 on the U.S. Billboard Hot Country Singles & Tracks for the week of March 31, 2001.

Chart (2001)	Peak position
US Hot Country Songs (Billboard)	9
US Billboard Hot 100	73

=== Year-end charts ===
Chart (2001)	Position
US Country Songs (Billboard)	41
