= Lisa Brokop =

Canadian country singer

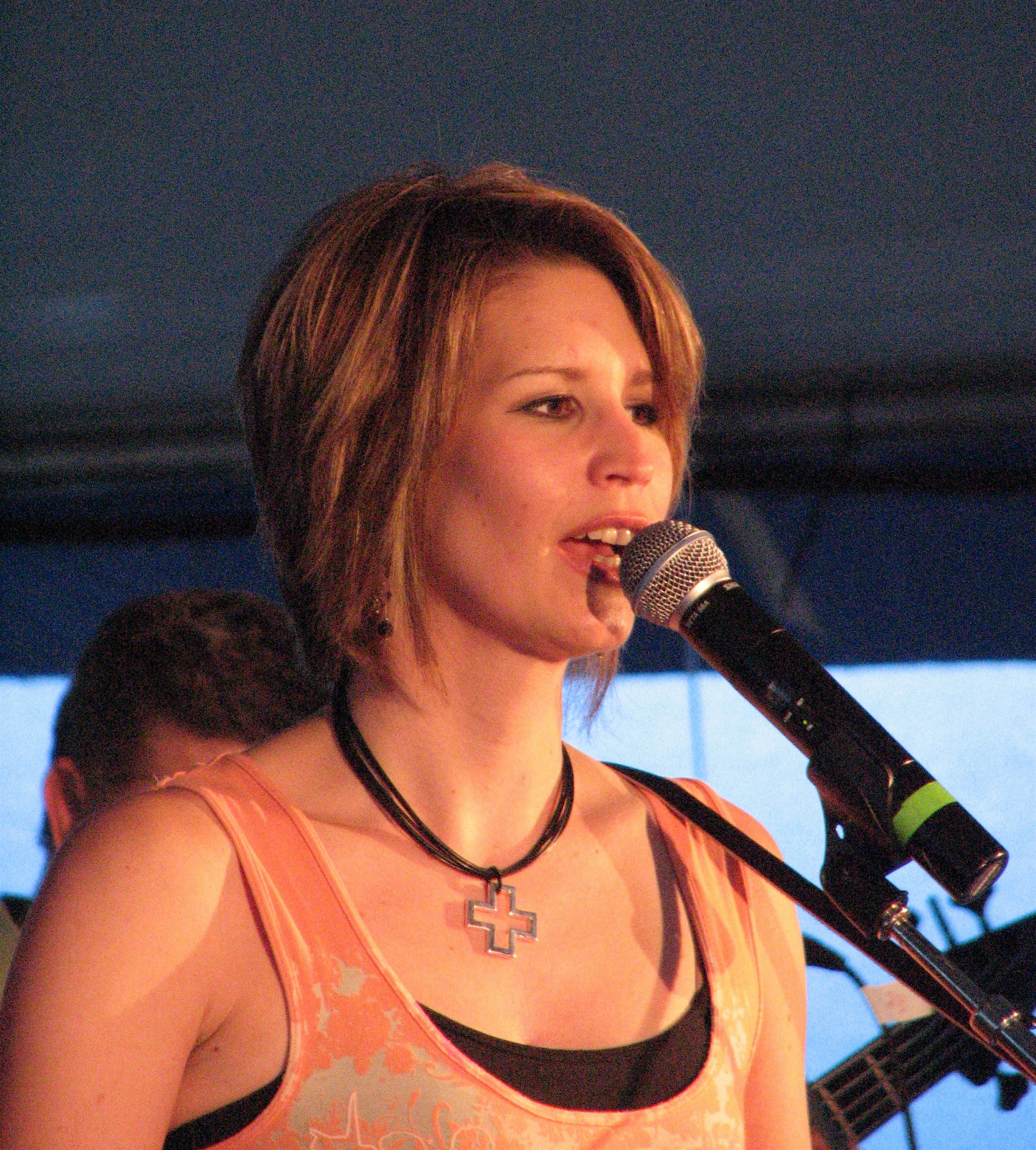
- Lisa Brokop performing at the 2006 Blue Mountain music festival

Background information
- Born: June 6, 1973 (age 53); Surrey, British Columbia, Canada
- Genres: Country
- Occupations: Singer, songwriter
- Years active: 1990–present
- Labels: Libre; Patriot; Capitol Nashville; Columbia; Cosmo; Curb; Ellbea; Amersong
- Formerly of: The Jeffersons
- Website: lisabrokop.com

Lisa Ann Brokop (born June 6, 1973) is a Canadian country music singer/songwriter. Active since 1990 in the country music field, she has released a total of seven studio albums and has charted more than twenty singles on the country music charts in her native Canada. Several of these singles have also crossed over to the American country music charts, although she has not entered the Top 40 in the U.S.; her highest-charting songs, "Give Me a Ring Sometime" and "Take That", both peaked at No. 52 in 1994. Her highest chart single is "Better Off Broken"; released in 1999, it reached No. 8 in Canada.

She was inducted into the Canadian Country Music Hall of Fame in 2025.

== Career ==
=== Early life ===
Lisa Brokop was born in Surrey, British Columbia in 1973. By age seven, she was performing on stage with her accordion-playing mother, performing polkas and numerous country music songs. When Brokop was twelve years old, she began sitting in with bands throughout Vancouver, British Columbia and joined a touring band in when she was 15. In 1990, when Brokop was only 17 years old, she issued her debut single, "Daddy, Sing to Me". The song managed to reach the top 10 of the Canadian RPM Country Tracks chart. Her debut album, My Love, was issued the following year on the independent Libre Records label. In June 1991, Brokop graduated from the Princess Margaret Secondary School in her hometown of Surrey; she then proceeded to move south to Nashville, Tennessee to further her country music career.

=== 1994–1999: Breakthrough success ===
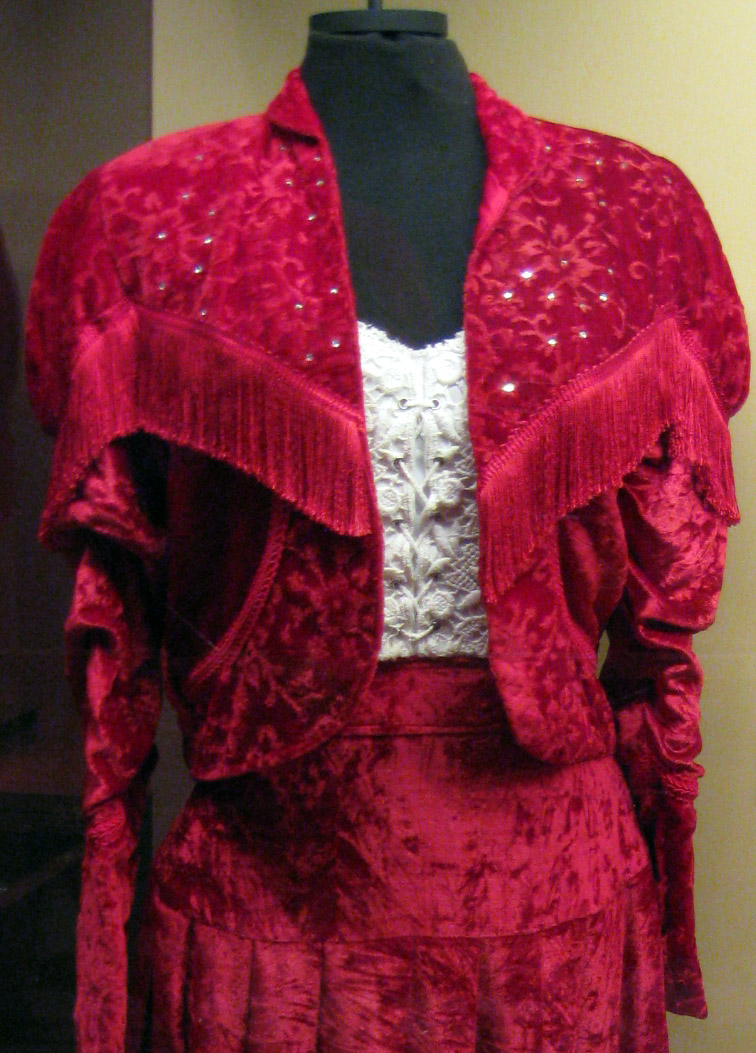
A costume Lisa Brokop wore for the 1993 movie 'Harmony Cats' (Surrey Museum)

In 1992, Brokop began performing in local clubs and caught the attention of The Nashville Network. The network began to play Brokop's video for her single "Time to Come Back Home" and had her as a guest on The Ralph Emery Show. The appearance on The Ralph Emery Show and a 30-minute showcase at a local club got Brokop a record deal with Patriot Records, a label owned by Liberty Records. Before Brokop began recording her second album, she starred alongside Hoyt Axton in the 1994 film Harmony Cats, where she played a country singer who leaves home in search of a big break in Nashville. Brokop contributed to the movie's soundtrack and her cover of Tammy Wynette's 1968 number one hit "Stand by Your Man" was issued as a single, peaking at No. 88 on the Canadian RPM Country Tracks chart.

The first single of Brokop's second album, "Give Me a Ring Sometime", was issued in June 1994. The single cracked the top 20 in Canada, but only reached No. 52 on the U.S. Billboard Hot Country Singles & Tracks chart. Nevertheless, her first major label album, Every Little Girl's Dream, was released in September 1994. While "Give Me a Ring Sometime" was charting, many Canadian radio stations refused to play Brokop's music after the Canadian Radio-television and Telecommunications Commission ruled that "Give Me a Ring Sometime" did not have a sufficient amount of Canadian content in the song. Nevertheless, Brokop's album went on to produce two more top 40 singles in Canada with "Take That" and "One of Those Nights". By 1995, the album had been certified Gold by the CRIA, for sales of 50,000 copies. Also in 1995, Brokop, along with fellow singers Victoria Shaw and Chely Wright, received a nomination for Top New Female Vocalist at the Academy of Country Music awards, but lost to Chely Wright.

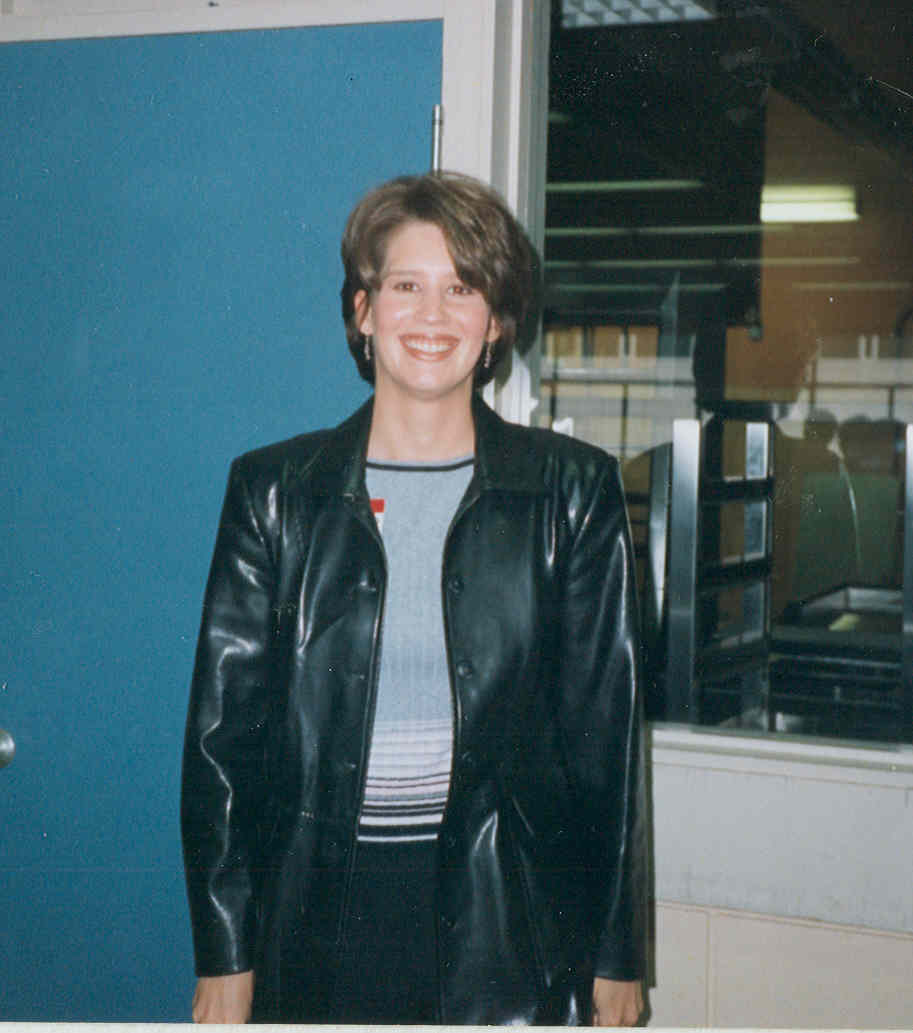
Lisa Brokop in June 1999

In 1995, Patriot Records had been shut down and Brokop was transferred to Capitol Nashville and issued her third album, Lisa Brokop, the following year. None of the album's first two singles reached the top 40 in Canada or the United States and the album's third, "West of Crazy", did not chart at all. The failure of the album left Brokop burned out and she then ended her relationship with Capitol to take time off to focus on songwriting.

In 1998, Brokop signed with the Nashville division of Columbia Records, where she released the single "How Do I Let Go". The song reached the top 20 of the RPM Country Tracks chart and received a nomination for SOCAN Song of the Year at the Canadian Country Music Association awards that year. Her album, When You Get to Be You, was released in July 1998 in Canada and produced five more singles including the No. 21-peaking "What's Not to Love" and "Better Off Broken", the latter becoming Brokop's highest-charting single, peaking at No. 8 on the Canadian RPM Country Tracks chart in 1999. The album was scheduled for release in the United States in 1998, but was not released due to the poor performance of the album's four American singles and Brokop departed Columbia by the end of 1999.

=== 2000 – present: Continued success ===
In 2000, Brokop ventured on her own and launched the Cosmo Records label where she released her fifth album, Undeniable. The album's first single, "Something Undeniable", had reached No. 18 on the country charts in Canada when RPM had been shut down. In 2001, Brokop received two Canadian Country Music Association awards for Independent Song of the Year for "Something Undeniable" and Independent Female Artist of the Year. The album's third single, "I'd Like to See You Try", won Brokop Independent Song of the Year again in 2002. She also was awarded Independent Female Artist of the Year again in 2002 and 2003.

In 2004, in an attempt to have success in the United States, Brokop signed with Asylum-Curb and issued her first single for the label, "Wildflower". The song failed to chart in the United States. An album, Hey, Do You Know Me, followed in January 2005 in Canada. The album was never released in the United States due to the failure of the first single. Shortly before departing Asylum-Curb in 2005, Brokop released the single "Big Picture" in Canada and the United States; it was never included on any album.

After a three-year hiatus, Brokop went back in the studio to record her seventh album, Beautiful Tragedy. The album was released in August 2008 on the independent Ellbea Records label and featured the hit "Break It". Eleven of the album's twelve tracks were co-written by Brokop and all tracks were produced by Brokop and her husband, country singer Paul Jefferson.

Brokop and husband Paul Jefferson have begun performing as The Jeffersons and released their debut album as a duo in 2011. The album has since released three singles in Canada: "Find the Sun," "Crazy On Me" and a country cover of The Wallflowers' 1996 song, "One Headlight".

In July 2013, Brokop signed a new deal with RareSpark media group to begin working on a new solo album. A new single, "Let It Burn" was released to Canadian Country radio on September 23.

Brokop has continued to release further projects, including "The Patsy Cline Project" in 2015 and "Who's Gonna Fill Their Heels" in 2023.

On New Year's Day 2026, she released the gospel album "The God I Know."

== Personal life ==
Lisa Brokop married her boyfriend of four years, Paul Jefferson, a fellow country singer and music producer on May 25, 2008. The history of their relationship was documented on the CMT Canada/GAC TV series, Our Song, the episode aired in March 2009 on CMT Canada. Jefferson helped Brokop "shape the stripped-down songs of [the album] Beautiful Tragedy in the couple's Nashville home studio." Brokop stated in 2008 that she and a small band were planning "to tour Canada's western provinces next January and February [2009], with a possible stop in Surrey." In February 2009, Brokop announced on stage that she was pregnant and, on August 7, 2009, Brokop and Jefferson welcomed the birth of their first child, Ivy Jefferson.

On January 28, 2022, on her Facebook page, Brokop voiced support for the trucker-led Canada convoy protest -- the so-called Freedom Convoy -- a series of protests and blockades against COVID-19 vaccine mandates and restrictions. She posted a video of her reading a verse from the bible and singing CeCe Winans' "Believe For It". She says in the video, "We’ve got to send out our worship songs, we need to worship and lift this up ahead of time, as they go into battle." Some protesters were photographed waving Nazi flags at the rallies. In a later post, Brokop said that the protest includes “some ugly and hateful images floating around that I definitely don’t support, but most everything I’ve seen has been about love and kindness and standing in support of each other. I’ve seen so many happy tears from people who finally feel like their voices are being heard, and have something to be hopeful for. That’s the Canada I know and love.” She subsequently continued to post in support of the protests.

== Discography ==
- My Love (1991)
- Every Little Girl's Dream (1994)
- Lisa Brokop (1996)
- When You Get to Be You (1998)
- Undeniable (2000)
- Hey, Do You Know Me (2005)
- Beautiful Tragedy (2008)
- The Patsy Cline Project (2015)
- Who's Gonna Fill Their Heels (2023)
- The God I Know (2026)
