= Lari White discography =

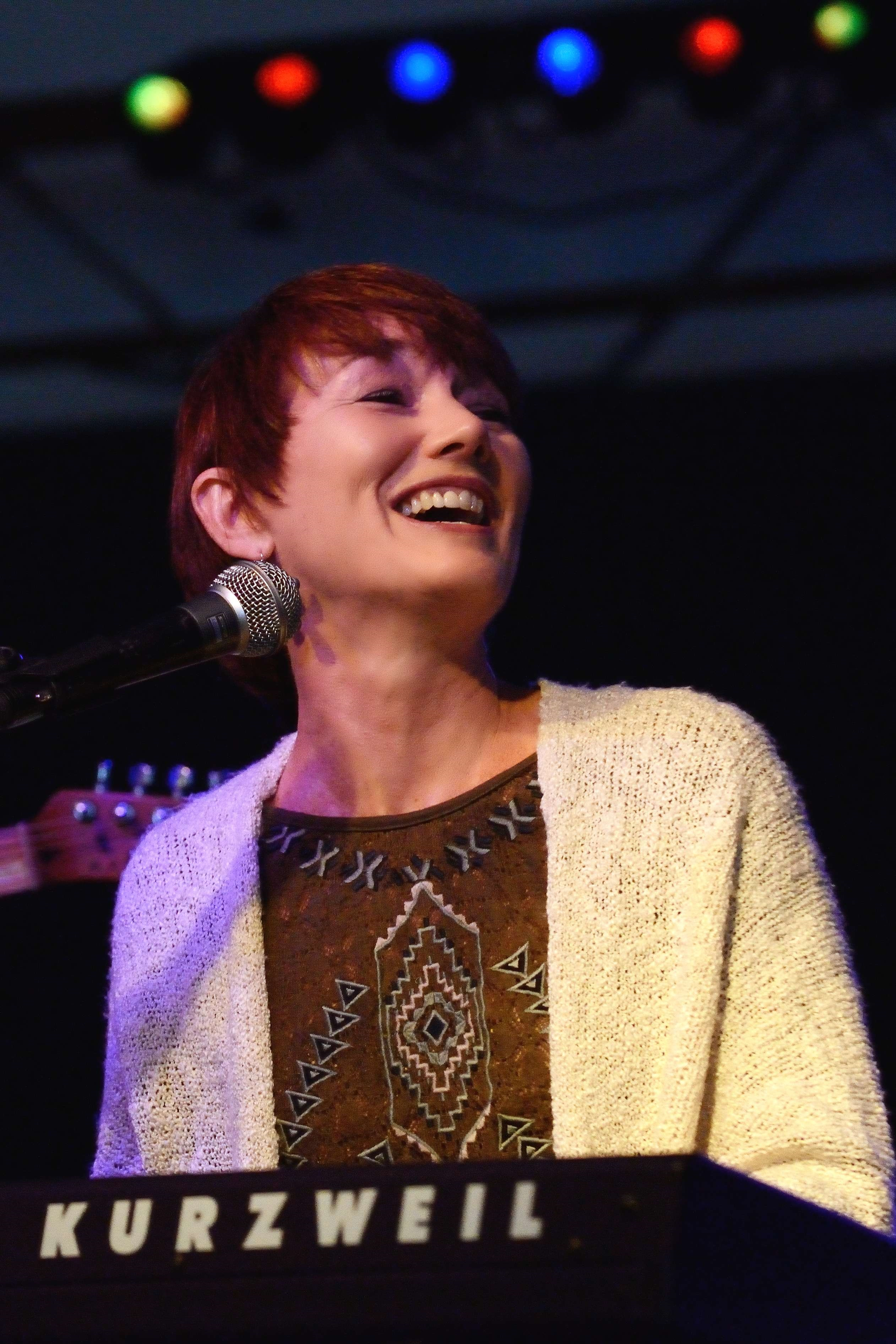
- Lari White in 2014
- Studio albums: 5
- EPs: 2
- Soundtrack albums: 1
- Compilation albums: 1
- Singles: 15
- Music videos: 13

American country music artist Lari White released five studio albums, one soundtrack album, one compilation album, two extended plays, and 15 singles.

Her first single release, "Flying Above the Rain", did not chart upon its 1988 release through Capitol Records. In 1993, she entered the Billboard Hot Country Songs charts for the first time with "What a Woman Wants", the debut single from her RCA Records Nashville album Lead Me Not. This album's follow-up, Wishes, charted three top-ten hits: "That's My Baby", "Now I Know", and "That's How You Know (When You're in Love)". White recorded Don't Fence Me In and a compilation titled The Best of Lari White before leaving RCA in 1997, followed by Stepping Stone for the former Lyric Street Records in 1998. All of her subsequent releases were through her own label, Skinny White Girl.

== Albums ==
Title	Album details	Peak chart positions			Certifications
Title	Album details	US	US Country	US Heat	Certifications
Lead Me Not	Release date: April 27, 1993; Label: RCA Nashville	—	—	36	
Wishes	Release date: June 14, 1994; Label: RCA Nashville	125	24	1	US: Gold
Don't Fence Me In	Release date: February 16, 1996; Label: RCA Nashville	—	53	30	
Best of Lari White	Release date: January 28, 1997; Label: RCA Nashville	—	—	—	
Stepping Stone	Release date: July 28, 1998; Label: Lyric Street Records	—	50	38	
Green Eyed Soul	Release date: May 10, 2004; Label: Skinny White Girl	—	—	—	
My First Affair (soundtrack)	Release date: 2007; Label: Skinny White Girl	—	—	—	
"—" denotes releases that did not chart

== Extended plays ==
Title	Album details
New Loves	Release date: 2017; Label: Skinny White Girl
Old Friends	Release date: 2017; Label: Skinny White Girl

== Singles ==
Year	Single	Peak chart positions			Album
Year	Single	US	US Country	CAN Country	Album
1988	"Flying Above the Rain"	—	—	—	Non-album single
1993	"What a Woman Wants"	—	44	39	Lead Me Not
1993	"Lead Me Not"	—	47	63	Lead Me Not
1993	"Lay Around and Love on You"	—	68	72	Lead Me Not
1994	"That's My Baby"	—	10	23	Wishes
1994	"Now I Know"	—	5	22	Wishes
1995	"That's How You Know (When You're in Love)"	—	10	18	Wishes
1995	"Amazing Grace"	—	—	—	Amazing Grace: A Country Salute to Gospel
1995	"Ready, Willing and Able"	—	20	14	Don't Fence Me In
1996	"Wild at Heart"	—	52	80	Don't Fence Me In
1998	"Stepping Stone"	73	16	10	Stepping Stone
1998	"Take Me"	— (Note: "Take Me" did not enter the Billboard Hot 100, but peaked at number 25 on Bubbling Under Hot 100 Singles, which acts as a 25-song extension of the Hot 100.)	32	27	Stepping Stone
1999	"John Wayne Walking Away"	—	64	—	Stepping Stone
2004	"Nothing but Love"	—	—	—	Green Eyed Soul
"—" denotes releases that did not chart

=== As a featured artist ===
Year	Single	Peak chart positions		Album
Year	Single	US Country	CAN Country	Album
1997	"Helping Me Get Over You" (Travis Tritt with Lari White)	18	21	The Restless Kind

== Other album appearances ==
Year	Title	Album
1995	"White Christmas"	The Best of Country Christmas, Vol. 5
1996	"Another Broken Heart" (with Esera Tuaolo)	NFL Country
1997	"There Is Power in the Blood"	Amazing Grace, Vol. 2: A Country Salute to Gospel
2001	"Shake My Sillies Out"	Country Goes Raffi

== Music videos ==
Year	Video	Director
1993	"What a Woman Wants"	Joanne Gardner
1993	"Lead Me Not"	Joanne Gardner
1994	"That's My Baby"	Steven Goldmann
1994	"Now I Know"	Steven Goldmann
1995	"That's How You Know (When You're In Love)"	Steven Goldmann
1995	"White Christmas"	Steven Goldmann
1996	"Wild at Heart"	Michael Salomon
1996	"Another Broken Heart" (with Esera Tuaolo)	
1997	"Amazing Grace"	
1997	"Helping Me Get Over You" (with Travis Tritt)	Michael Merriman
1999	"Take Me"	Peter Zavadil
2005	"Nothing But Love"	Dani Jacobs
2016	"Champagne"	Christin Sites
