= Best of Lari White =

Compilation album by Lari White
- Released: January 28, 1997
- Recorded: April 1993–February 13, 1996
- Genre: Country
- Length: 47:21
- Label: RCA Nashville
- Producer: Various original producers

Lari White chronology
Don't Fence Me In (1996)	Best of Lari White (1997)	Stepping Stone (1998)

Professional ratings
Review scores
Source	Rating
Allmusic	link

Best of Lari White is the first compilation album by American country music artist Lari White, released on January 28, 1997. It is composed mainly of tracks from her first three albums for RCA: Lead Me Not (1993), Wishes (1994), and Don't Fence Me In (1996). The tracks "Amazing Grace" and "Helping Me Get over You" (a duet with Travis Tritt) were previously unreleased on any of White's albums, although "Helping Me Get Over You" was included on Tritt's 1996 album The Restless Kind.

== Track listing ==
No.	Title	Writer(s)	Length
1.	"Amazing Grace"	John Newton	4:12
2.	"Itty Bitty Single Solitary Piece O' My Heart"	Lari White, John Rotch	3:29
3.	"Lay Around and Love on You"	Bobby David, Dave Gillon	2:55
4.	"Lead Me Not"	White	4:07
5.	"What a Woman Wants"	White, Chuck Cannon	3:06
6.	"Wild at Heart"	White, Al Anderson	2:25
7.	"Just Thinking"	White	3:32
8.	"That's My Baby"	White, Cannon	3:27
9.	"That's How You Know (When You're in Love)"	White, Cannon	3:41
10.	"Now I Know"	Don Cook, Cindy Greene, Chick Rains	4:32
11.	"Ready, Willing and Able"	Jess Leary, Jody Allen Sweet	3:12
12.	"I've Been Waiting for Your Love"	Terry Burns, Stephony Smith	4:34
13.	"Helping Me Get Over You" (duet with Travis Tritt)	White, Travis Tritt	4:09
Total length:			47:21
