= Wrong (Waylon Jennings song) =

1990 country music single

- Cassette single cover art

Single by Waylon Jennings

from the album The Eagle
- B-side: "Waking Up with You"
- Released: May 1990
- Genre: Country
- Length: 2:58
- Label: Epic
- Songwriter: Steve Seskin; Andre Pessis
- Producers: Richie Albright; Bob Montgomery

Waylon Jennings singles chronology
| "You Put the Soul in the Song" (1989) | "Wrong" (1990) | "Where Corn Don't Grow" (1990) |

"Wrong" is a song written by Steve Seskin and Andre Pessis, and recorded by American country music singer Waylon Jennings. It was released in May 1990 as the first single from his album The Eagle.

"Wrong" spent twenty-one weeks on the Hot Country Songs charts and peaked at number five. The song was the last top ten hit of his career, and his first since "Rough and Rowdy Days" three years previous. Only one of his other singles for Epic, "The Eagle", made the top 40 on the same chart.

"Wrong" was also the b-side to the album's third single, "What Bothers Me Most".

The music video features Playboy's Miss December 1992, Barbara Moore.

== Chart performance ==
| Chart (1990) | Peak position |
|---|---|
| Canada Country Singles (RPM) | 2 |
| US Hot Country Songs (Billboard) | 5 |

=== Year-end charts ===
| Chart (1990) | Position |
|---|---|
| Canada Country Tracks (RPM) | 19 |
| US Country Songs (Billboard) | 65 |
