= Thrasher Shiver (album) =

Studio album by Thrasher Shiver
- Released: September 9, 1996
- Genre: Country
- Label: Asylum
- Producer: Archie Jordan, Justin Niebank, Neil Thrasher, Kelly Shiver

Thrasher Shiver is the only album by the American country music duo Thrasher Shiver, which was composed of singer-songwriters Neil Thrasher and Kelly Shiver. Their only album, it was issued in 1996 on Asylum Records. Two singles were released from it: "Goin' Goin' Gone" and "Be Honest", which respectively reached #65 and #49 on the Billboard Hot Country Singles & Tracks (now Hot Country Songs) charts. Thrasher Shiver produced the album along with Justin Niebank, while Archie Jordan also co-produced "Be Honest". "Between the Stones and Jones" was previously recorded by Daron Norwood on his 1995 album Ready, Willing and Able, and "Closer" was later recorded by the Canadian band Jo Hikk on its 2008 debut album Ride. After this album's release, Thrasher and Shiver parted ways, and Thrasher has since become a songwriter for other artists.

== Critical reception ==
Giving it three stars out of five, Thom Jurek of Allmusic called it "polished but impassioned country-rock that touches on honky tonk, barroom weepers and modern country barn-burners" but said that the duo "sometimes suffers from trying to [sic] hard to avoid Nashville clichés." Chuck Hamilton of Country Standard Time praised the duo's vocal harmonies and called "All the King's Horses" the countriest-sounding cut, but added, "Obviously Thrasher and Shiver have more talent than the run of the mill hunks with hats. Maybe next time, the suits will let them show more of it."

== Track listing ==
1. "Goin' Goin' Gone" (Neil Thrasher, Michael Dulaney) - 4:31
2. "All the King's Horses" (Jess Leary, Jody Alan Sweet) - 3:16
3. "Closer" (Thrasher, Kim Williams, Kent Blazy) - 3:26
4. "You and I Belong" (Buddy Mondlock, Reeva Hunter) - 3:45
5. "She's the Only One" (Mary Jordan, Allyson Taylor) - 4:14
6. "Run Like the Wind" (Roger Alan Wade, Dennis Knutson) - 3:33
7. "Tragedy" (Thrasher, Blazy) - 3:41
8. "Between the Stones and Jones" (Williams, Cyril Rawson, Kim Tribble) - 3:08
9. "The Rails" (Thrasher, Kelly Shiver, John Greenebaum) - 4:33
10. "That's My Girl" (Thrasher, Shiver, Blazy) - 3:53
11. "Be Honest" (Shiver, Archie Jordan) - 3:16

== Personnel ==
As listed in liner notes.

=== Thrasher Shiver ===
- Kelly Shiver – vocals, acoustic guitar on "Be Honest"
- Neil Thrasher – vocals

=== Additional musicians ===
- Larry Byrom – acoustic guitar
- Shannon Forrest – drums
- Larry Franklin – fiddle
- Justin Niebank – keyboards on "Tragedy"
- Russ Pahl – acoustic guitar, steel guitar, Dobro
- Don Potter – acoustic guitar and Dobro on "Be Honest"
- Michael Rhodes – bass guitar
- Matt Rollings – piano, organ
- Steuart Smith – electric guitar

=== String section on "Be Honest" ===
- Carl Gorodetzky – violin
- Jim Grosjean – viola
- Bob Mason – cello
- Pamela Sixfin – violin
