= Shawn Camp =

Shawn Camp may refer to:

- Shawn Camp (baseball), American baseball coach
- Shawn Camp (musician), American musician
  - Shawn Camp (album), his self-titled debut album
