= More Than You'll Ever Know =

Single by Travis Tritt

from the album The Restless Kind
- B-side: "Still in Love with You"
- Released: July 15, 1996
- Recorded: 1996
- Genre: Country
- Length: 3:23
- Label: Warner Bros. Nashville 17606
- Songwriter: Travis Tritt
- Producers: Don Was, Travis Tritt

Travis Tritt singles chronology
"Only You (And You Alone)" (1996)	"More Than You'll Ever Know" (1996)	"Where Corn Don't Grow" (1996)

"More Than You'll Ever Know" is a song written and recorded by American country music artist Travis Tritt. It was released in July 1996 as the lead-off single from his album The Restless Kind. It peaked at number 3 in the United States, and number 7 in Canada.

== Content ==
The song is a ballad, that paints the picture of a man coming to terms with his own emotions and struggling to convey the depth of his feelings to the woman in his life.

== Critical reception ==
Deborah Evans Price, of Billboard magazine reviewed the song favorably, calling it a "sweet ballad that boasts some great lines." She goes on to say that his "heartfelt delivery on this tune should make it an instant success" and that the "country to the core instrumentation" is a good addition.

== Music video ==
The song's music video was directed by John Lloyd Miller and premiered on Country Music Television on July 15, 1996. The video features an old man, later revealed to be Tritt’s grandfather, cutting the flowers to make a bouquet in a hospital, scenes also feature Tritt singing the song in his room.

== Chart positions ==
Chart (1996)	Peak position
Canada Country Singles (RPM)	7
US Bubbling Under Hot 100 (Billboard)	10
US Hot Country Songs (Billboard)	3

=== Year-end charts ===
Chart (1996)	Position
Canada Country Tracks (RPM)	88
US Country Songs (Billboard)	53
