= Green Eyed Soul (Lari White album) =

Studio album by Lari White
- Released: May 10, 2004
- Genres: Rock, pop rock, blues, country
- Length: 55:00
- Labels: Skinny White Girl Records, Mesmerizing Records (U.K.)
- Producer: Lari White

Lari White chronology
Stepping Stone (1998)	Green Eyed Soul (2004)	My First Affair (2007)

Professional ratings
Review scores
Source	Rating
Allmusic	4/5 stars
The Guardian	4/5 stars

Green Eyed Soul is the fifth studio album to be released by Lari White, and the first to be released on her own Skinny White Girl label. White began working on the songs for "Green Eyed Soul" while still signed as a country artist on Lyric Street Records. The soul and gospel flavored material was a departure from her country label origins, and she decided to release the album independently.

The album was originally released in Europe on May 10, 2004, by Mesmerizing Records. The U.S. release followed on July 26, 2005, on White's Skinny White Girl label in partnership with Emergent Music Marketing and RED Distribution.

== Track listing ==
1. "Nothing But Love" (Lari White, Kimmie Rhodes, Kevin Savigar) – 4:06
2. "Let's Keep It Together" (White, Rick Neigher) – 5:08
3. "Right Here Right Now" (White, Gary Nicholson) – 5:05
4. "Eden Before the Fall" (White, Nicholson) – 4:27
5. "Because I'm A Woman" (White) – 4:49
6. "Groove w/ Me Baby" (White, Chuck Cannon, Jeffrey Steele) – 8:21
7. "We Got It Goin' On" (White, Savigar) – 4:35
8. "One More Time" (White, Travon Potts) – 4:21
9. "Loved Right" (White, Cannon) – 5:13
10. "High" (White, Paul Thorn, Billy Maddox) – 5:53
11. "Bare" (White) – 3:00

== Personnel ==
- Lari White — Vocals
- Michael Rhodes — Bass
- Dan Needham — Drums
- Tim Akers — Keys
- Jerry Mcpherson — Guitars
- Jim Horn — Saxophones and Flute
- Mike Haynes — Trumpet and Flugel Horn
- Barry Green — Trombone
- Connie Ellisor — Strings
- Frederick L. Vaughn — background vocal leader, background vocals
- Sherrie Kibble — background vocals
- Dana Dixon — background vocals
- Elissa N. Oats — background vocals
- Dion Jackson — background vocals
- Kimberly Mont — background vocals
- Nirva Dorsaint — background vocals
- Shandra Penix — background vocals
