= Shawn Camp (album) =

Studio album by Shawn Camp
- Released: 1993
- Studios: Javelina Studios (Nashville, Tennessee)
- Genre: Country
- Length: 33:03
- Label: Reprise
- Producer: Mark Wright

Shawn Camp chronology
Shawn Camp (1993)	Lucky Silver Dollar (2001)

Singles from Shawn Camp
- 1. "Fallin' Never Felt So Good" Released: July 31, 1993; 2. "Confessin' My Love" Released: November 20, 1993

Shawn Camp is the debut studio album by American country music singer Shawn Camp. It was released in 1993 via Reprise Records.

== Content ==
The album produced three singles: "Confessin' My Love", "Fallin' Never Felt So Good", and "Man, What a Woman". Mark Wright produced the album.

Dude Mowrey originally recorded "Fallin' Never Felt So Good" on his 1991 debut album Honky Tonk. Mark Chesnutt recorded both "Confessin' My Love" and "Fallin' Never Felt So Good" on his 2000 album Lost in the Feeling (also produced by Wright), in addition to releasing his version of the former as a single that year. Rhett Akins covered "K-I-S-S-I-N-G" on his 1996 album Somebody New.

== Critical reception ==
Daniel Cooper of New Country magazine gave the album 2.5 out of 5 stars, praising Camp's singing and production but criticizing his lyrics, saying that "there's nary a memorable line anywhere on the record." Bobby Peacock of Roughstock was favorable when reviewing the album's 2010 release, praising Camp's lyrics while comparing the album's sound favorably to Marty Stuart and Dwight Yoakam.

== Track listing ==
No.	Title	Writer(s)	Length
1.	"Fallin' Never Felt So Good"	Shawn Camp, Will Smith	4:39
2.	"Confessin' My Love"	Camp, John Scott Sherrill	3:11
3.	"K-I-S-S-I-N-G"	Camp, Herb McCullough	3:07
4.	"I'm Not Just Passin' Through"	Jeff Stevens, Jim McBride, Marvin Morrow	3:34
5.	"Man, What a Woman"	Camp, Dean Miller	2:31
6.	"Speakin' of the Angel"	Camp, Jim Rushing	2:46
7.	"Bound to Cry"	Camp, Sherrill	3:54
8.	"One of Them Days"	Camp, McCullough	2:43
9.	"Turn Loose of My Pride"	Camp, Miller	3:53
10.	"A Little Bit of Love"	Camp, Smith	2:42

== Personnel ==
Compiled from Shawn Camp liner notes.

- Shawn Camp – vocals, acoustic guitar, dobro, fiddle
- Steve Nathan – keyboards
- James Burton – electric guitars
- Dan Dugmore – acoustic guitar
- Pat Flynn – acoustic guitar
- Brent Rowan – electric guitars
- Biff Watson – acoustic guitar
- Paul Franklin – steel guitar
- Alan O'Bryant – banjo, backing vocals (6)
- Jimmy Stewart – dobro
- Roy Huskey, Jr. – bass
- Willie Weeks – bass
- Owen Hale – drums, percussion
- Kenny Malone – drums, percussion
- Nashville String Machine – strings
- Bergen White – string arrangements and conductor
- Carl Gorodetzky – concertmaster
- Jim Lauderdale – backing vocals (1)
- Shelby Lynne – backing vocals (2)
- Alison Krauss – backing vocals (3)
- John Wesley Ryles – additional backing vocals
- Dennis Wilson – additional backing vocals
- Mark Wright – additional backing vocals
- Curtis "Mr. Harmony" Young – additional backing vocals

=== Production ===
- Paige Levy – A&R direction
- Mark Wright – producer
- Warren Peterson – recording
- Robert Charles – overdub recording, recording assistant
- John Hampton – mixing at Ardent Studios (Memphis, Tennessee)
- Eric Flettrich – mix assistant
- Skidd Mills – mix assistant
- Bob Ludwig – mastering at Gateway Mastering (Portland, Maine)
- Joe Johnston – production coordinator
- Laura Lipuma-Nash – art direction
- Garrett Rittenberry – design
- Peter Nash – photography
- Tania Crouch and Bob Romeo with Turn Key Management – management
