= Willing and Able =

Willing and Able may refer to:

- "Willing & Able" (Disclosure song), from the album Caracal
- Willing & Able, from the ballet Billboards
- "Willing and Able" (Prince song), from the album Diamonds and Pearls
- "Willing and Able" (Noah Kahan song), from the album The Great Divide

== See also ==
- Willing and Abel, a television comedy series
- Ready, Willing, and Able
