= Flies on the Butter (You Can't Go Home Again) =

2004 song by Wynonna Judd and Naomi Judd

Single by Wynonna Judd with Naomi Judd

from the album What the World Needs Now Is Love
- Released: March 3, 2004
- Genre: Country
- Length: 4:30
- Label: Curb
- Songwriters: Chuck Cannon; Austin Cunningham; Allen Shamblin
- Producers: Wynonna Judd; Dann Huff

Wynonna Judd singles chronology
"Heaven Help Me" (2003)	"Flies on the Butter" (2004)	"I Want to Know What Love Is" (2004)

"Flies on the Butter (You Can't Go Home Again)" is a song written by Chuck Cannon, Austin Cunningham, and Allen Shamblin. Originally recorded by Lari White in 1998, it was recorded by Wynonna Judd and released on March 3, 2004 as the third single from her sixth solo studio album What the World Needs Now Is Love.

== Content ==
The song is a reminiscence of the narrator's childhood. Wynonna Judd said that the lyrics reminded her of her grandparents' house in rural Kentucky. The song features her mother, Naomi, on backing vocals. The two had previously recorded together in the 1980s as the Judds prior to Wynonna beginning her solo career in the 1990s. It was originally recorded by Lari White on her 1998 album Stepping Stone.

== Critical reception ==
Deborah Evans Price of Billboard reviewed the song favorably, saying that "you believe the words [Wynonna] is singing, and with her mom on the cut, it just adds to the emotional impact."

== Chart performance ==
Despite Wynonna and Naomi having recorded together as the Judds in the 1980s, the single instead credited Wynonna and Naomi separately. As a result, it is Naomi's only chart credit.

Chart (2004)	Peak position
US Hot Country Songs (Billboard)	33
