= Daron Norwood (album) =

Studio album by Daron Norwood
- Released: February 1, 1994
- Recorded: 1993
- Studio: Loud Recording Studios, Mesa Recording Studios, Nashville, TN
- Genre: Country
- Length: 34:20
- Label: Giant
- Producer: James Stroud, Jeff Carlton

Daron Norwood chronology
Daron Norwood (1994)	Ready, Willing and Able (1995)

Daron Norwood is the self-titled debut studio album by American country music singer Daron Norwood. It was released on February 1, 1994 via Giant Records. The album includes the singles "If It Wasn't for Her I Wouldn't Have You", "Cowboys Don't Cry", and "If I Ever Love Again", of which the first two were top 40 hits on the Hot Country Songs chart. "Cowboys Don't Cry" was originally released by Dude Mowrey on his 1991 album Honky Tonk. Both "Phonographic Memory" and "If I Ever Love Again" were originally recorded by their co-writer Curtis Wright on his 1992 self-titled debut album.

== Critical reception ==
The album received a mostly-favorable review in Billboard, which praised Norwood's "pleasantly resonant voice" and said that he "displays both his songwriting potential and an engaging way with a ballad." Brian Mansfield rated the album 2.5 out of 5 stars in New Country magazine, praising Norwood's "natural quaver that often makes him sound like he's two steps from tears" and highlighting the singles as being among the strongest cuts, but overall criticizing the album as "too familiar."

== Track listing ==
No.	Title	Writer(s)	Length
1.	"Cowboys Don't Cry"	Jim Allison, Jeff Raymond, Bob Simon, Doug Gilmore	3:06
2.	"If It Wasn't for Her I Wouldn't Have You"	J. L. Wallace, Terry Skinner	3:34
3.	"Phantom of the Opry" (featuring Travis Tritt)	Billy Lawson, John Schweers, Roger Murrah	3:55
4.	"Phonographic Memory"	Robert Ellis Orrall, Curtis Wright, Doug Millett	2:24
5.	"J.T. Miller's Farm"	Daron Norwood, Lawson, Mike O'Rear	4:18
6.	"Honky Tonk Heartache of the Year"	Lonnie Wilson, Wayne Perry	2:50
7.	"If I Ever Love Again"	Wright, Billy Spencer	3:50
8.	"A Little Bigger Piece of American Pie"	Craig Wiseman, Ronnie Samoset	3:24
9.	"I Was Losing You"	Bruce Burch	3:09
10.	"That's Life"	Bud McGuire, Mike McGuire	3:50

== Personnel ==
Compiled from liner notes.

Musicians

- David Briggs — strings
- Larry Byrom — acoustic guitar
- Sonny Garrish — steel guitar
- Dann Huff — electric guitar
- Gary Prim — keyboards
- Joe Spivey — fiddle
- Jimmy Tipton — electric guitar
- Lonnie Wilson — drums
- Curtis Wright — background vocals
- Glenn Worf — bass guitar
- Curtis Young — background vocals

Technical

- Jeff Carlton — production
- Julian King — engineering
- Glenn Meadows — mastering
- Lee Peterzell — engineering
- Lynn Peterzell — engineering
- James Stroud — production

Recorded and mixed at Loud Recording Studios, Nashville, Tennessee.
