= Lost in the Feeling (Mark Chesnutt album) =

Studio album by Mark Chesnutt
- Released: October 17, 2000
- Studios: Javelina Studios and House of Gain (Nashville, Tennessee); Sound Kitchen (Franklin, Tennessee)
- Genre: Country
- Length: 35:09
- Label: MCA Nashville
- Producers: Marty Stuart; Mark Wright

Mark Chesnutt chronology
I Don't Want to Miss a Thing (1999)	Lost in the Feeling (2000)	Mark Chesnutt (2002)

Professional ratings
Review scores
Source	Rating
Allmusic	3/5 stars

Lost in the Feeling is the ninth studio album by American country music artist Mark Chesnutt. This album marked Chesnutt's return to MCA after the dissolution of the Decca Records Nashville division in 1999. The two singles from this album, which were the title track and "Fallin' Never Felt So Good", both failed to reach Top 40 on the Hot Country Songs charts, making this the first studio album of Chesnutt's career not to have any Top 40 hits.

Both "Fallin' Never Felt So Good" and "Confessin' My Love" were recorded and released as singles from Shawn Camp's self-titled debut album in 1993. The former was originally recorded by Dude Mowrey on his 1991 debut album Honky Tonk as well. "Try Being Me" was previously recorded by Larry Stewart on 1994's Heart Like a Hurricane, and "It Pays Big Money" was later recorded under the title "Big Money" by Garth Brooks on his 2001 album Scarecrow. The title track is a Conway Twitty cover, and a cover of Gene Watson's "Love in the Hot Afternoon" is included as well.

== Track listing ==
1. "Fallin' Never Felt So Good" (Shawn Camp, Will Smith) - 3:52
2. "Confessin' My Love" (Camp, John Scott Sherrill) - 3:24
3. "Halfway Back to Birmingham" (Don Cook, Mark Wright, Ronnie Rogers) - 3:26
4. "Try Being Me" (Tim Mensy) - 3:50
5. "Go Away" (Mark Nesler, Tony Martin) - 3:18
6. "It Pays Big Money" (Camp, Randy Hardison, Wynn Varble) - 4:06
7. "Love in the Hot Afternoon" (Vince Matthews, Kent Westberry) - 3:43
8. "Angelina" (Steve Diamond, Rick Orozco, Vern Dant) - 2:58
9. "Lost in the Feeling" (Lewis Anderson) - 3:04
10. "Somewhere out There Tonight" (Rogers) - 3:28

== Personnel ==
- Mark Chesnutt – lead vocals
- John Barlow Jarvis – acoustic piano
- Steve Nathan – keyboards
- Mark Casstevens – acoustic guitar
- B. James Lowry – acoustic guitar, high-third acoustic guitars, electric guitars
- Tim Mensy – acoustic guitar
- Brent Rowan – electric guitars
- Biff Watson – acoustic guitar
- John Willis – acoustic guitar, bouzouki
- Paul Franklin – steel guitar
- Michael Rhodes – bass
- Glenn Worf – bass
- Owen Hale – drums
- Lonnie Wilson – drums, tambourine
- Eric Darken – percussion
- Stuart Duncan – fiddle, mandolin
- Larry Franklin – fiddle, mandolin
- Jim Horn – saxophones
- Sam Levine – saxophones
- Denis Solee – saxophones
- Mike Haynes – trumpet
- George Tidwell – trumpet
- The Nashville String Machine – strings
- Bergen White – string arrangements and conductor, backing vocals
- Lisa Cochran – backing vocals
- Randy Hardison – backing vocals
- Vicki Hampton – backing vocals
- Carl Jackson – backing vocals
- Marabeth Jordan – backing vocals
- Brice Long – backing vocals
- John Wesley Ryles – backing vocals
- Lisa Silver – backing vocals
- Harry Stinson – backing vocals
- Wynn Varble – backing vocals
- Cindy Walker – backing vocals
- Lee Ann Womack – backing vocals
- Curtis Young – backing vocals

Production

- Mark Wright– producer
- Marty Stuart – co-producer (9)
- Greg Droman – recording, overdub recording, mixing
- Robert Charles – overdub recording (1–8, 10), second engineer (1–8, 10), BGV recording (9)
- Steve Crowder – second engineer
- Melissa Mattey – additional second engineer (1–8, 10), second engineer (9)
- Chris Sherbar – additional second engineer (1–8, 10)
- Steve Singleton – additional second engineer (1–8, 10)
- Grant Greene – BGV second engineer (9)
- Tim Coyle

– mix assistant

- Todd Gunnerson – mix assistant, second engineer (9)
- Hank Williams – mastering at MasterMix (Nashville, Tennessee)
- Jessie Noble – project coordinator
- Bill Brunt Design – design
- Jim "Señor" McGuire – photography
- Ladd Management – management

== Chart performance ==
Chart (2000)	Peak position
U.S. Billboard Top Country Albums	53
