= That's How You Know =

That's How You Know may refer to:

- "That's How You Know" (Disney song), 2007
- "That's How You Know" (Nico & Vinz song), 2014
- "That's How You Know (When You're in Love)" (1995), by Lari White
