= Ride (Jo Hikk album) =

Studio album by Jo Hikk
- Released: April 7, 2009
- Recorded: 2007–2009
- Genre: Country
- Length: 41:25
- Label: Landis Productions Ltd.
- Producer: George Canyon, Rick Mizzoni

Jo Hikk chronology
Ride (2009)	The Game (2010)

Ride was the first album released by the band Jo Hikk. It was released by Landis Productions Ltd. in 2009. The album includes the hit singles "Sweet City Woman" and "My Kind of Radio." "Closer" was previously recorded by Thrasher Shiver on its self-titled debut and "It's Only Monday" was previously a single for Brice Long in 2005.

== Track listing ==
1. "Ride" – 3:01
2. "Scarecrow" – 4:04
3. "West Texas Crude" – 3:44
4. "Pimp My Tractor" – 3:27
5. "Shame on the Moon" – 3:55
6. "Sweet City Woman" – 3:18
7. "Dancing with the Devils" – 4:14
8. "Suck It Up" – 4:09
9. "My Kind of Radio" – 4:00
10. "It's Only Monday" – 3:51
11. "Closer" – 3:43

== Personnel ==
- Kenny Sitter - guitar, backing vocals, banjo
- Don Jorgensen - keyboards, mandolin
- Kelly Sitter - bass, lead vocals
- Al Doell - drums, backing vocals
