= Don't Fence Me In (Lari White album) =

Studio album by Lari White
- Released: February 16, 1996
- Genre: Country
- Length: 39:06
- Label: RCA Nashville
- Producer: Lari White; Josh Leo

Lari White chronology
Wishes (1994)	Don't Fence Me In (1996)	Best of Lari White (1997)

Singles from Don't Fence Me In
- 1. "Ready, Willing and Able" Released: December 4, 1995; 2. "Wild at Heart" Released: May 6, 1996

Professional ratings
Review scores
Source	Rating
AllMusic	3/5 stars
Entertainment Weekly	B+

Don't Fence Me In is the third studio album by the American country music artist Lari White, released on February 16, 1996; it was her final album released for RCA Nashville Records, after which the label would drop her. Two singles were released from the album, "Ready, Willing and Able" and "Wild at Heart", the former hitting number 20 while the latter became her first single since 1993 to miss the top forty.

== Content ==
"Ready, Willing, and Able" was previously cut by Daron Norwood on his 1995 album of the same name.

The "Wild at Heart" music video was controversial. Said video was withdrawn from CMT and The Nashville Network after only a month due to protests from mental health organizations. The video featured White as a patient in a psychiatric hospital, encouraging the other patients to dance.

== Track listing ==
Don't Fence Me In track listing
No.	Title	Writer(s)	Length
1.	"Don't Fence Me In" (featuring Shelby Lynne and Trisha Yearwood)	Robert Fletcher; Cole Porter	0:33
2.	"Wild at Heart"	Lari White; Al Anderson	2:23
3.	"Ready, Willing and Able"	Jess Leary; Jody Alan Sweet	3:10
4.	"Ghost of a Chance"	White; Chuck Jones	4:02
5.	"The Test"	Don Schlitz; Billy Livsey	3:28
6.	"Ain't Gonna Worry About Love No More"	Michael Noble	3:07
7.	"Next to Love"	White; Chuck Cannon	3:51
8.	"Something Blue"	White; Cannon	3:22
9.	"Do It Again"	White; Cannon	3:25
10.	"I've Been Waiting for Your Love"	Terry Burns; Stephony Smith	4:32
11.	"Soul Searchin' Blues"	White	0:42
12.	"Woman of the World"	White; Jones	3:36
13.	"Don't Fence Me In" (Reprise)	Fletcher; Porter	3:34
14.	"Soul Searchin' Blues" (Reprise)	White	2:40
Total length:			39:06

== Personnel ==
Compiled from liner notes.

Musicians

- Al Anderson — electric guitar
- Bill Cuomo — keyboards
- Dan Dugmore — steel guitar, Dobro
- Glen Duncan — fiddle, mandolin
- Sonny Garrish — steel guitar
- Steve Gibson — banjo
- Rob Hajacos — fiddle
- Mike Henderson — National slide guitar
- John Hobbs — keyboards
- Dann Huff — electric guitar
- Josh Leo — electric guitar
- Carl Marsh — keyboards, strings
- Gary Morse — steel guitar
- Steve Nathan — keyboards
- Don Potter — acoustic guitar
- Harry Stinson — drums, percussion
- Steuart Smith — electric guitar
- Biff Watson — acoustic guitar
- Willie Weeks — bass guitar
- Lari White — lead vocals
- Lonnie Wilson — drums, percussion
- Glenn Worf — bass guitar
- Reese Wynans — keyboards

Backing vocalists

- Max Carl
- Vince Gill
- Kim Keyes
- Mark Luna
- Shelby Lynne on "Don't Fence Me In"
- Stephony Smith
- Harry Stinson
- Trisha Yearwood on "Don't Fence Me In"
- Lari White

Technical

- Josh Leo — producer
- Steve Marcantonio — recording, mixing
- Denny Purcell — mastering
- Lari White — producer

== Charts ==
Chart (1996)	Peak position
US Top Country Albums (Billboard)	53
US Heatseekers Albums (Billboard)	30
