= Ready, Willing, and Able =

"Ready, Willing, and Able" can refer to:

- Ready, Willing, and Able (film), a 1937 movie
  - Ready, Willing, and Able (1937 song), a song by composer Richard Whiting and lyricist Johnny Mercer, introduced in the movie
- Ready, Willing, and Able (1954 song), a song by Floyd Huddleston, Dick Gleason, and Al Rinker, popularized by Doris Day in the movie Young at Heart
- "Ready, Willing and Able", a song by All Saints from Saints & Sinners
- ”Ready, Willing and Able,” a song by Petra off of their album Unseen Power
- Ready, Willing and Able (album), 1995 album by Daron Norwood
  - "Ready, Willing, and Able" (Daron Norwood song), this album's title track, later released by Lari White on the album Don't Fence Me In
