= What a Woman Wants =

Single by Lari White

from the album Lead Me Not
- B-side: "Good Good Love"
- Released: February 1, 1993
- Genre: Country
- Length: 3:04
- Label: RCA Nashville
- Songwriters: Lari White; Chuck Cannon
- Producers: Rodney Crowell; Lari White; Steuart Smith

Lari White singles chronology
| "What a Woman Wants" (1993) | "Lead Me Not" (1993) |

"What a Woman Wants" is the debut single by American country music artist Lari White. It was released on February 1, 1993, as the lead single to her RCA Nashville Records debut studio album Lead Me Not (1993). The track is co-written and co-produced by her, with extra writing credits going to Chuck Cannon and extra production credits going to Rodney Crowell and Steuart Smith. The track was not a chart success but received positive reception from music critics.

== Critical reception ==
Billboard magazine gave the track a positive review, saying "White's single debut showcases her powerhouse vocals against a backdrop of fast-paced, dance-oriented tracks." Michael Hochanadel of The Daily Gazette said that White "uncorks a growly vibrato and impressive power right at the top of her range" in the song. Lisa Smith and Cyndi Hoelzle of Gavin Report reviewed the track positively as well saying, "[Rodney] Crowell produced her debut, and captured White's spunk and spirit. Lari co-wrote this wise lesson on life and love with her boyfriend Chuck Cannon." Brad Hogue of Cashbox called it a "lively enough song to interest radio."

== Music video ==
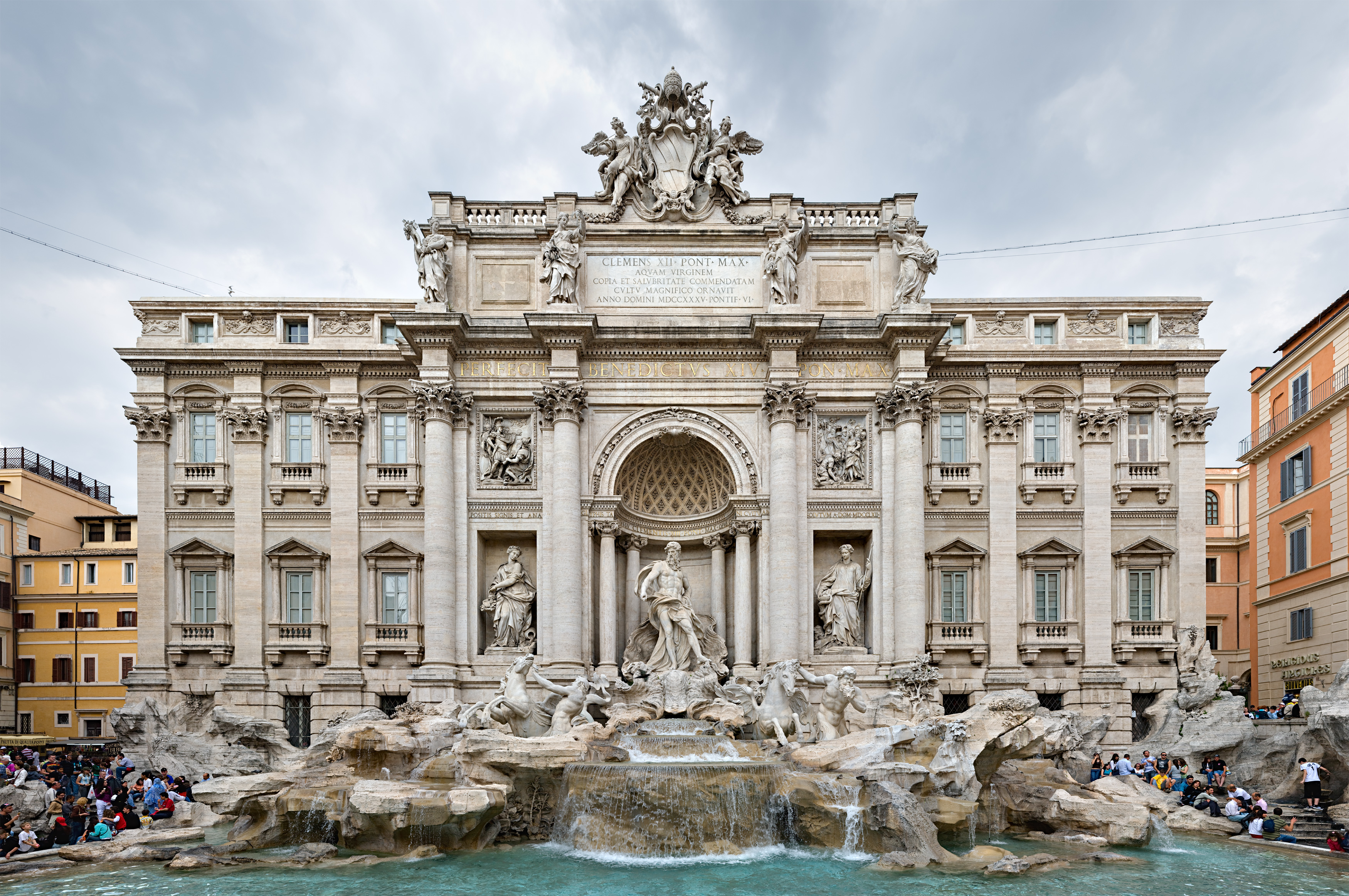
White's debut music video was shot on site in Rome, Italy.

The song is most remembered for its music video, as it was the first country music video ever shot in Europe, being filmed in Rome, Italy. It was directed by Joanne Gardner Lowell and was filmed in November 1992. The video prominently features the Trevi Fountain. It was released to both Country Music Television (CMT) and The Nashville Network (TNN) for the week of January 9, 1993.

== Chart performance ==
"What a Woman Wants" debuted on the US Billboard Hot Country Songs chart the week of February 13, 1993, at number 75. In its ninth week, the track would hit a peak position of number 44 on April 10, 1993 and spent 12 weeks in total on the chart; it was the highest charting single from the Lead Me Not album. White would later speak of the underwhelming success of this song and her debut album in a 1995 interview, "It broke my heart. It's like taking your heart out and putting it there on the table for everybody to do with as they will."

== Personnel ==
Taken from the Lead Me Not booklet.

- Albert Lee – electric guitar
- Bill Payne – piano and Hammond organ
- Michael Rhodes – bass guitar
- Vince Santoro – drums and harmony vocals

== Track listing ==
US 7-inch single

1. "What a Woman Wants" – 3:04
2. "Good Good Love" – 4:04

== Charts ==
Weekly chart performance for "What a Woman Wants"
| Chart (1993) | Peak position |
|---|---|
| Canada Country Singles (RPM) | 39 |
| US Hot Country Songs (Billboard) | 44 |
| US Country Top 50 (Radio & Records) | 32 |
| US Country (Gavin Report) | 31 |
| US Top 100 Country Singles (Cashbox) | 35 |
