= If It Wasn't for Her I Wouldn't Have You =

Single by Daron Norwood

from the album Daron Norwood
- B-side: "A Little Bigger Piece of American Pie"
- Released: November 8, 1993
- Genre: Country
- Length: 3:34
- Label: Giant
- Songwriters: J.L. Wallace; Terry Skinner
- Producers: Jeff Carlton; James Stroud

Daron Norwood singles chronology
"If It Wasn't for Her I Wouldn't Have You" (1993)	"Cowboys Don't Cry" (1994)

"If It Wasn't for Her I Wouldn't Have You" is a song written by J.L. Wallace and Terry Skinner, and recorded by American country music artist Daron Norwood. It was released in November 1993 as his debut single and the first from his album Daron Norwood. The song reached number 26 on the Billboard Hot Country Singles & Tracks chart while it peaked at number 12 on the Canadian RPM Country Tracks chart.

== Music video ==
The music video premiered in late 1993.

== Chart performance ==
"If It Wasn't for Her I Wouldn't Have You" debuted on the U.S. Billboard Hot Country Singles & Tracks for the week of November 27, 1993.

Chart (1993–1994)	Peak position
Canada Country Singles (RPM)	12
US Hot Country Songs (Billboard)	26
