= Cowboys Don't Cry =

Single by Daron Norwood

from the album Daron Norwood
- B-side: "J.T. Miller's Farm"
- Released: April 16, 1994
- Genre: Country
- Length: 3:06
- Label: Giant
- Songwriter(s): Jim Allison; Doug Gilmore; Bob Simon; Jeff Raymond
- Producer(s): James Stroud, Jeff Carlton

Daron Norwood singles chronology
"If It Wasn't for Her I Wouldn't Have You" (1993)	"Cowboys Don't Cry" (1994)	"If I Ever Love Again" (1994)

"Cowboys Don't Cry" is a song recorded by American country music artist Dude Mowrey. It was the only single from his 1991 debut album Honky Tonk. Mowrey's version charted at number 65 on the Hot Country Songs chart that year. The song was written by Jim Allison, Doug Gilmore, Bob Simon and Jeff Raymond.

It was later recorded by American country music artist Daron Norwood, and was released in April 1994 as the second single from his eponymous debut album. The song reached No. 24 on the Billboard Hot Country Singles & Tracks chart.

== Chart performance ==
Chart (1994)	Peak position
Canada RPM Country Tracks	22
US Hot Country Songs (Billboard)	24
