= Lari White =

American country musician, singer, songwriter, producer, and actress (1965–2018)

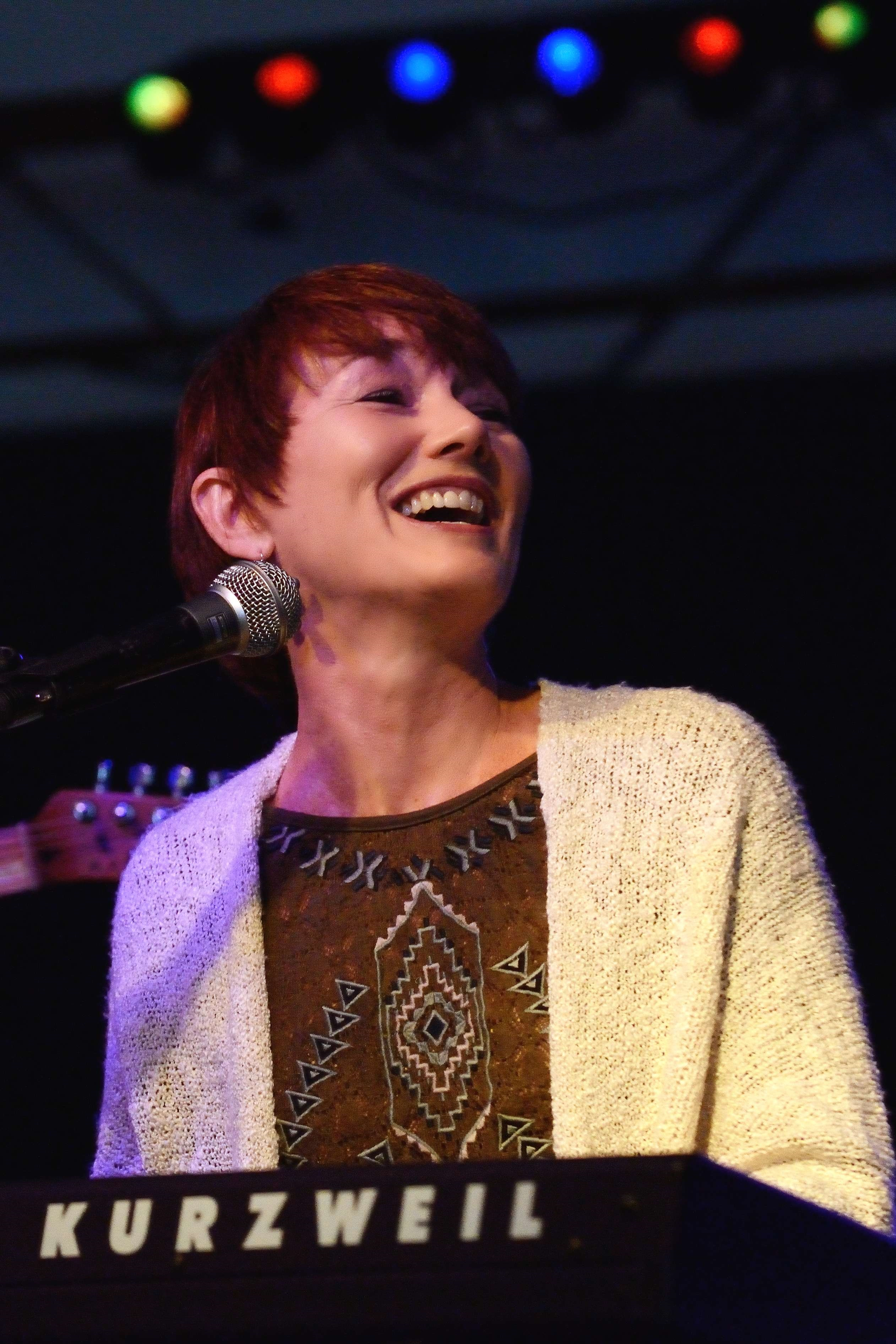
- White in 2014

Background information
- Born: Lari Michele White; May 13, 1965; Dunedin, Florida, U.S.
- Died: January 23, 2018 (aged 52) Nashville, Tennessee, U.S.
- Cause of death: Peritoneal cancer
- Genre: Country
- Occupations: Musician; singer; songwriter; record producer; actress
- Instruments: Vocals; guitar; piano
- Works: Lari White discography
- Years active: 1988–2017
- Labels: Capitol Nashville; RCA Nashville; Lyric Street; Skinny White Girl
- Spouse: Chuck Cannon (m. 1994)
- Website: lariwhite.com

Lari Michele White Cannon (/ˈlɑːri/, LAH-ree; May 13, 1965 – January 23, 2018) was an American country musician, singer, songwriter, record producer, and actress. She made her debut in 1988 after winning You Can Be a Star, a televised talent competition on The Nashville Network. After an unsuccessful stint on Capitol Records Nashville, she signed to RCA Records Nashville in 1993.

White released four albums for RCA between then and 1997: Lead Me Not, Wishes, Don't Fence Me In, and the compilation The Best of Lari White. Wishes was certified gold and charted three top-ten hits on the Billboard Hot Country Songs charts: "That's My Baby", "Now I Know", and "That's How You Know (When You're in Love)". In 1998, she was the first artist signed to the former Lyric Street Records; she released Stepping Stone before leaving the label in 2000, and recorded all subsequent projects independently.

Her musical style is defined by her vocal delivery and a variety of musical influences including country, blues, and contemporary R&B. In addition to her own work, White produced albums for Toby Keith and Billy Dean, and wrote songs for Tammy Wynette, Travis Tritt, Danny Gokey, and Sarah Buxton. She also acted in the television pilot XXX's and OOO's, the 2000 movie Cast Away, and her own cabaret production, My First Affair.

White was married to songwriter Chuck Cannon until her death from peritoneal cancer in 2018.

== Biography ==
=== Early life ===
Lari Michele White was born May 13, 1965, in Dunedin, Florida. Her parents, Larry and Yvonne White, were both school teachers. As a child, she sang in her family's gospel group called The White Family Singers. The group included both parents along with her sister (Natasha) and brother (Torne). White took piano lessons starting at age four, and continued to play throughout her childhood despite losing her left pinky finger in an accident. She sang at talent contests, and performed in a local rock band called White Sound. She graduated from Dunedin High School in 1983. In 1987, she graduated from the University of Miami's Frost School of Music, where she studied vocal technique and sound engineering. During this time she also composed music and performed in local clubs. While at Frost School of Music, White was a classmate of Paul Deakin, who would go on to become a founding member of The Mavericks. White made her first national appearance in 1988 on the television talent show You Can Be a Star on the former TNN (The Nashville Network); she won first prize, including a recording contract with Capitol Records Nashville. She released one single through Capitol titled "Flying Above the Rain", which she wrote with Lisa Silver. When it failed to chart, White was dropped from Capitol's roster without releasing anything else. Following her departure, White continued focused on songwriting, which led to Tammy Wynette recording her song "Where's the Fire?" in 1990. She also did radio and television commercial jingles in this time span.

=== 1993: Lead Me Not ===
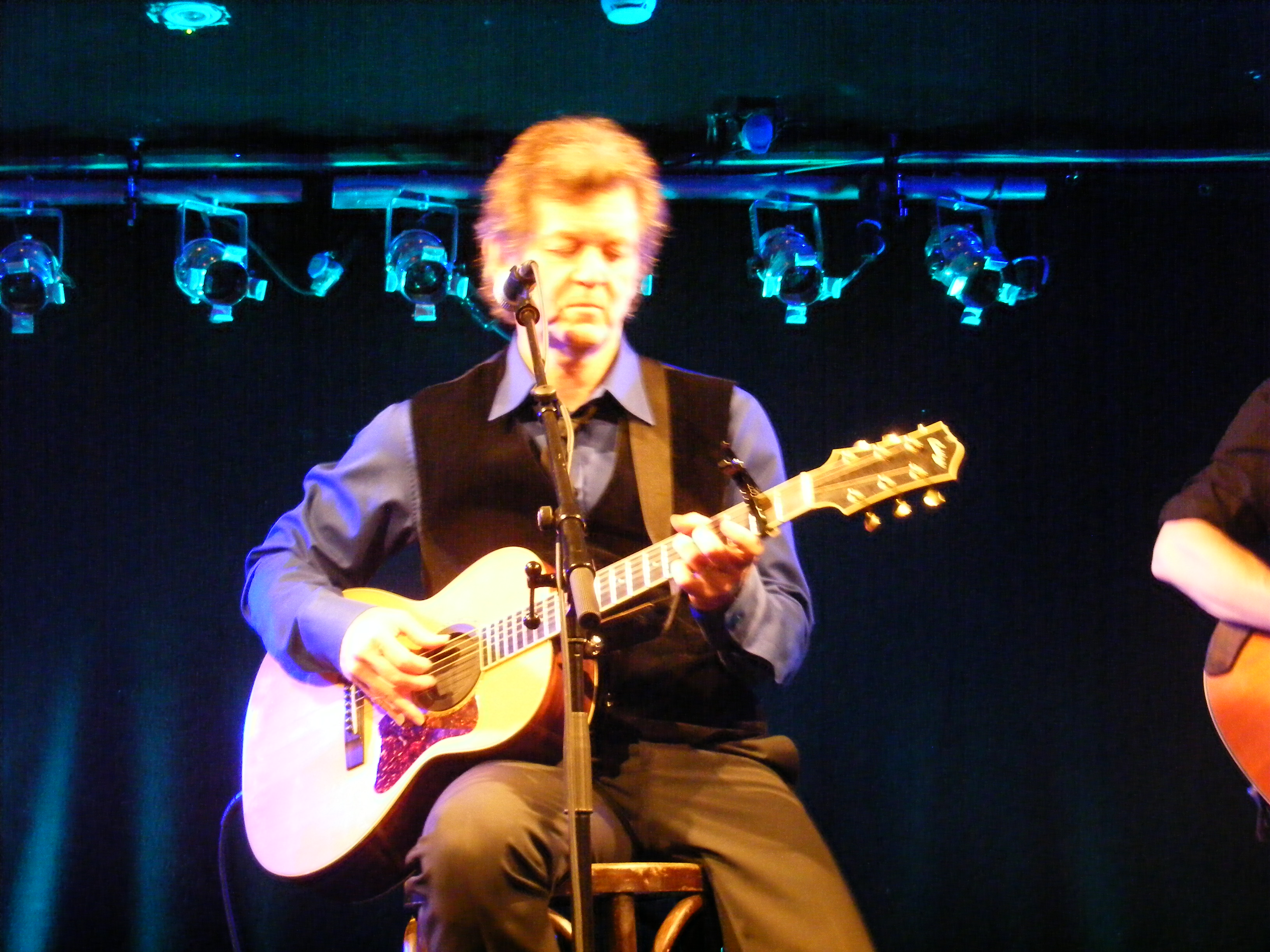
White sang backing vocals for Rodney Crowell, who produced her debut album.

In the early 1990s, she joined a publishing house owned by Ronnie Milsap, also taking acting lessons and performing at local dinner theaters. White ultimately decided not to pursue acting at the time, as she preferred music. Despite this, she attributed the acting lessons as helping her become more confident on stage. White unsuccessfully auditioned to become lead singer of the band Highway 101 after their previous vocalist (Paulette Carlson) quit. After attending an American Society of Composers, Authors and Publishers (ASCAP) showcase in 1991, she was discovered by a cousin of country singer Rodney Crowell, who at the time was looking for a backing vocalist in his touring band. Crowell liked her vocals and thus encouraged her to sign with RCA Records Nashville, which she did in January 1992.

In 1993, the label released her debut album Lead Me Not. Co-produced with Crowell and guitarist Steuart Smith, the disc included three singles: "What a Woman Wants", the title track, and "Lay Around and Love on You". All three of these singles entered the Billboard Hot Country Songs chart, although none reached the Top 40. Both "What a Woman Wants" and the title track received music videos which were aired on CMT and TNN. The former was the first country music video to be shot in Europe; specifically, at a setting in Rome. Research conducted by music journalist Joseph Fenity in 2021 declared the "Lead Me Not" video to be a lost television broadcast, as RCA Records Nashville executives were unable to find the video in their archives. Smith also played guitar on the album, while Crowell, Claudia Church, Russ Taff, and Radney Foster provided background vocals. Brian Mansfield of AllMusic noted the musical variety on the album, but thought that this variety kept the album's singles from being successful on the charts. Alanna Nash shared a similar opinion in Entertainment Weekly, describing the album as "both dazzling in its diversity and confusing in its direction."

=== 1994–1995: Wishes ===
In 1994, RCA Nashville released White's next studio album titled Wishes. The album was also her most commercially successful. It accounted for three consecutive top-ten entries on the Billboard country charts between then and 1995: "That's My Baby", "Now I Know", and "That's How You Know (When You're in Love)". Of these, "Now I Know" was her highest-ranking single with a peak of number five in 1995, while the other two both peaked at number ten. White co-wrote both "That's My Baby" and "That's How You Know", plus three other songs on the album, with songwriter Chuck Cannon; the two of them married just before the album's release. White said that the collaborations with Cannon came during writing sessions with him on his front porch at his home in Nashville, Tennessee. Other contributing songwriters included Verlon Thompson, Suzi Ragsdale, Tom Shapiro, and Chris Waters. Garth Fundis produced the album; he also sang backing vocals on it alongside Thompson, Cannon, and Hal Ketchum, the last of whom did so on "That's How You Know". "That's My Baby", upon its release, had a music video which received rotation on VH-1. Richard McVey of Cash Box wrote that "Now I Know" was "rich lyrically and vocally". Reviewing the album for AllMusic, Johnny Loftus praised White's "torchy vocal" along with the "grit" of the musicianship. Pete Couture of the Tampa Bay Times called the album "a meditation on love", and praised the vocal performances on the singles in particular.

On May 15, 1995, the Recording Industry Association of America (RIAA) gave Wishes a gold certification for shipments of 500,000 copies in the United States. White also received a nomination by the Academy of Country Music awards for Best New Female artist. White accompanied this with an acoustic set at Fan Fair (now CMA Music Festival) in 1994, followed by her first tour in 1995. She also starred in XXX's and OOO's, a 1994 television pilot for CBS.

=== 1996–1997: Don't Fence Me In and other contributions ===
White's next release was Don't Fence Me In in early 1996. The title track was a cover of the Cole Porter-written song made famous by The Andrews Sisters. White's rendition included backing vocals from Shelby Lynne and Trisha Yearwood. White said that she perceived Don't Fence Me In as a concept album with a central theme of "breaking down barriers" and "rising above tough circumstances", according to New Country magazine. The album's lead-off single was "Ready, Willing and Able", previously recorded by Daron Norwood in 1995 as the title track to his second album. White's rendition of the song was a Top 20 hit in 1996, although the follow-up single "Wild at Heart" did not reach Top 40. The latter song's music video was withdrawn from television networks TNN and CMT after only a month due to mental health organizations protesting its use of a psychiatric hospital as a setting. Despite this, the video has since been made available online via Vevo. Writing for Country Standard Time, McVey stated that "With grittier-style vocals, a lot of attitude and definite musical growth, White offers up an album that has finally seen her come into her own". He found influences of contemporary R&B and blues in White's delivery and production. Jim Ridley of New Country magazine praised the album's concepts and the cover songs, along with the slide guitar work of Mike Henderson and the vocal contributions from Lynne and Yearwood, but criticized Josh Leo's production as "slick and syrupy".

White and Cannon co-wrote and sang backing vocals on "The Lonely", a track from Toby Keith's 1996 album Blue Moon. She also co-wrote and sang duet vocals on Travis Tritt's mid-1997 single "Helping Me Get Over You", from his album The Restless Kind. Her final release for RCA was a greatest hits package called The Best of Lari White reprising all her singles to that point. Also included on the album was her rendition of the hymn "Amazing Grace", which had previously been released as a single from the 1995 Sparrow Records multi-artist compilation Amazing Grace: A Country Salute to Gospel. She covered another hymn, "There Is Power in the Blood", for the soundtrack of the 1997 Robert Duvall movie The Apostle. After The Best of Lari White, she exited RCA. At the time, she cited "lack of commitment" from RCA executives, as well as the birth of her daughter, as reasons for her departure.

=== 1998–1999: Stepping Stone ===
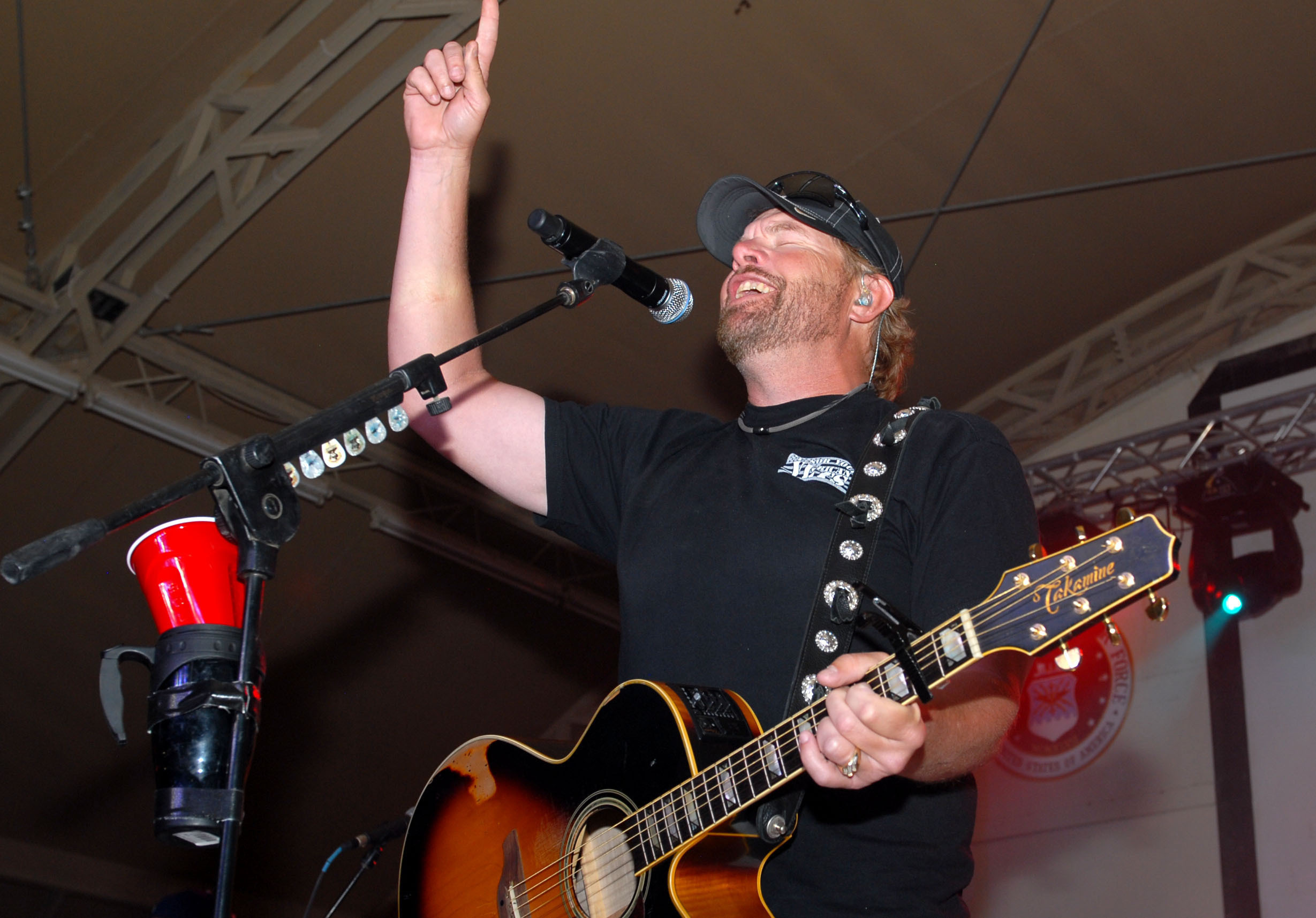
White collaborated with Toby Keith on several occasions.

White's third recording contract came in 1998 when she signed to Lyric Street Records, then a newly founded country music label owned by Disney Music Group. The label's then-president, Randy Goodman, had selected her as the first act for the new label. Her 1998 single "Stepping Stone" was the label's first release. At the time, Goodman thought that making White the first artist signed to Lyric Street would help raise awareness of the new label, due to her previous chart successes. The song originated with a poem that co-writer David Kent had e-mailed to White prior to her signing. "Stepping Stone" became a top 20 country hit in 1998; it was also her only entry on the Billboard Hot 100, peaking at number 73. The corresponding album, also titled Stepping Stone, came out later in the year. It accounted for two more singles with "Take Me" and "John Wayne Walking Away", which were less successful on the charts.

Lyric Street Records executives allowed White to choose her own producer, and she chose Dann Huff. Huff also played lead guitar on the album; he was joined on bass guitar by Mike Brignardello, with whom he previously recorded in the hair metal band Giant. Cannon played acoustic guitar on the album, while Mary Ann Kennedy and Pam Rose were among the backing vocalists. The album included a duet with Toby Keith on the Robert John "Mutt" Lange composition "Only God (Could Stop Me Loving You)", and Keith also co-wrote the track "Tired". "Only God (Could Stop Me Loving You)" was later recorded by Canadian country band Emerson Drive on their 2002 self-titled album, and "Flies on the Butter (You Can't Go Home Again)" by Wynonna Judd on her 2003 album What the World Needs Now Is Love. Jana Pendragon of AllMusic wrote that "while most of the material on this project is not worthy of her talent, she still makes a good showing all across the board." She considered White's vocals the strongest on "Flies on the Butter (You Can't Go Home Again)" and "On a Night Like This".

=== 2000–2017: Later music career and acting ===
White ended her contract with Lyric Street in 2000 when label executives wanted her to record in a more country pop style than her previous albums. The same year, her agent submitted a head shot of her to the producers of the movie Cast Away, who were looking to cast a female country music singer in a role. The producers selected White to play the role of a sculptor with whom Tom Hanks's character interacts. After the film, she placed her musical career on hiatus. She returned in 2004 with the self-released album Green Eyed Soul. Unlike her previous albums, this one focused more on rhythm and blues and soul music; she chose to do so because she felt at the time that she "wasn't fitting into the format" of country music radio. Thom Jurek of AllMusic rated the album four out of five stars, stating, "Make no mistake, this is a very smooth, slick record; but its depth cannot be denied and as a pop record, one of the majors could have scored big with it." Also during this time span, she produced Billy Dean's 2004 album Let Them Be Little and Toby Keith's 2005 album White Trash with Money.

White continued acting in Broadway theatre in the 2000s. One of her roles in this timespan was an original cast member of the Broadway musical Ring of Fire, a musical tribute show to Johnny Cash featuring renditions of his songs. In 2007, she debuted a cabaret production called My First Affair. The cabaret show was at the Oak Room cabaret at the Algonquin Hotel in Manhattan, New York City, on February 12, 2007. The show's set list included both Broadway standards and songs that White wrote herself. Also in 2007, twelve tracks from this production were released on an album of the same name. The album was released on April 6, 2007 on Skinny White Girl Records.

White and Cannon co-wrote Sarah Buxton's late-2008 single "Space", as well as Danny Gokey's 2010 single "I Will Not Say Goodbye". In 2014, a group of twenty-four authors and songwriters assembled a collection of stories in a book entitled The Shoe Burnin': Stories of Southern Soul. Included alongside the hardback publication is an audio CD including eighteen original works by the songwriters featured in the book. White is a featured storyteller in The Shoe Burnin' as well as the producer of the audio component of the project. In 2017, she released a pair of extended plays titled New Loves and Old Friends. The former consisted of new songs, while the latter included re-recordings of her hit singles. Collaborators on the latter included Buxton, Cannon, Dan Dugmore, and Charlie Worsham. Matt Bjorke of Roughstock wrote that White "gives us reason to believe in classic storytelling and songwriting and makes a case that we should get to hear more of this brilliant kind of music somewhere".

== Musical styles ==
White's music is defined by her singing voice and stylistic variety. Dave Scheiber of the Tampa Bay Times wrote of White that she had a "strong, crystalline voice that smoothly blends country, rock, pop, and blues stylings". Alanna Nash of Entertainment Weekly compared her voice favorably to that of K. T. Oslin, while an uncredited review of Wishes in RPM called her "a belter with a soft edge that doesn't allow for tedium". Both this and Pete Couture's review of the same album in the Tampa Bay Times compared her favorably to Linda Ronstadt. Bjorke compared her voice to Bonnie Raitt and Diana Krall; he also thought that the New Loves and Old Friends projects showed influences of jazz and soul music.

Writing about her debut album, David Bauder of The Associated Press stated that it "cuts a wide swath from country to gospel to rock and roll...clearly on display is the versatility that's marked her career. Some critics, though, have complained about a lack of focus." Couture wrote of White's delivery on "Now I Know" that she "builds from an understated, almost confessional reading, to one of powerful defiance on the chorus." He also said of her voice that it "is impressive not only in its range, but in its clarity and control." In a 2015 interview, White said that she found difficulty breaking through in the country music scene due to an unusually large number of female acts being played on radio at the time. She also said that much of the material on Don't Fence Me In was inspired by her perception that "the country radio box was a little too small".

== Personal life and legacy ==
White married songwriter and song publisher Chuck Cannon on April 23, 1994. Prior to their marriage, Cannon had co-written her single "What a Woman Wants"; he would also write "That's My Baby" and "That's How You Know (When You're in Love)". The couple had three children together: daughters M'Kenzy and Kyra Ciel, and one son named Jaxon. White and Cannon founded the Skinny White Girl label on which White released her later albums; the two also built their own recording studio and founded a second label called Nashville Underground.

In September 2017, just months after the release of her New Loves and Old Friends EPs, White was diagnosed with cancer. Exploratory surgery in October 2017 revealed advanced peritoneal cancer. She died in Nashville, Tennessee, on January 23, 2018, at the age of 52.

Journalist Joseph Fenity announced plans in mid-2025 to create a documentary on White, as well as archival of her music, in a project called the Lari White Legacy Project. The documentary will include previously-unseen footage of the singer as well as archived interviews with her. White was inducted into the Women Songwriters Hall of Fame in June 2025.

== Discography ==
Studio albums

- Lead Me Not (1993)
- Wishes (1994)
- Don't Fence Me In (1996)
- The Best of Lari White (1997)
- Stepping Stone (1998)
- Green Eyed Soul (2004)
- My First Affair soundtrack (2007)
