= Confessin' My Love =

Single by Shawn Camp

from the album Shawn Camp
- B-side: "K-I-S-S-I-N-G"
- Released: November 20, 1993
- Genre: Country
- Length: 3:11
- Label: Reprise
- Songwriter(s): Shawn Camp, John Scott Sherrill
- Producer(s): Mark Wright

Shawn Camp singles chronology
"Fallin' Never Felt So Good" (1993)	"Confessin' My Love" (1993)	"Man, What a Woman" (1994)

"Confessin' My Love" is a song co-written and recorded by American country music artist Shawn Camp. It was released in November 1993 as the second single from the album Shawn Camp. The song reached #39 on the Billboard Hot Country Singles & Tracks chart. The song was written by Camp and John Scott Sherrill.

Mark Chesnutt covered the song on his 2000 album Lost in the Feeling.

== Chart performance ==
Chart (1993–1994)	Peak position
US Hot Country Songs (Billboard)	39
Canadian RPM Country Tracks	51
