= Where Corn Don't Grow =

Single by Travis Tritt

from the album The Restless Kind
- B-side: "She's Going Home with Me"
- Released: November 25, 1996
- Recorded: 1996
- Genre: Country
- Length: 3:28
- Label: Warner Bros. Nashville 17451
- Songwriters: Roger Murrah, Mark Alan Springer
- Producers: Travis Tritt, Don Was

Travis Tritt singles chronology
| "More Than You'll Ever Know" (1996) | "Where Corn Don't Grow" (1996) | "Here's Your Sign (Get the Picture)" (1997) |

"Where Corn Don't Grow" is a song written by Roger Murrah and Mark Alan Springer. It was first recorded by Waylon Jennings on his 1990 album The Eagle, peaking at #67 on the country singles charts that year. Six years later, Travis Tritt covered it on his 1996 album The Restless Kind. Also released as a single, his rendition was a Top Ten country hit in 1997, peaking at #6 on the same chart. On April 12, 2021, rising country star Riley Green released a cover of the song in an ode to both Tritt and Jennings.

== Music video ==
The music video for Tritt's version was directed by Michael Merriman. The video features a young man who leaves his father's farm in search of a life in the big city. The young man eventually has his guitar, wallet, and everything but his father's gold watch stolen. He steals food from a store because he has no money, but is caught and arrested. The young man is eventually revealed to be Tritt when he returns to his father's home with the gold watch.

== Chart positions ==
=== Waylon Jennings ===
| Chart (1990) | Peak position |
|---|---|
| Canada Country Singles (RPM) | 92 |
| US Hot Country Songs (Billboard) | 67 |

=== Travis Tritt ===
"Where Corn Don't Grow" debuted at number 73 on the U.S. Billboard Hot Country Singles & Tracks for the week of November 23, 1996.

| Chart (1996–1997) | Peak position |
|---|---|
| Canada Country Singles (RPM) | 8 |
| US Hot Country Songs (Billboard) | 6 |

==== Year-end charts ====
| Chart (1997) | Position |
|---|---|
| Canada Country Tracks (RPM) | 76 |
| US Country Songs (Billboard) | 46 |
