= The Eagle (album) =

Studio album by Waylon Jennings
- Released: June 29, 1990
- Recorded: Early 1990
- Studios: Eleven-Eleven Sound Studios, The Music Mill, Nashville, TN
- Genres: Country; outlaw country
- Length: 29:54
- Label: Epic
- Producers: Richie Albright; Bob Montgomery

Waylon Jennings chronology
Full Circle (1988)	The Eagle (1990)	Clean Shirt (1991)

Singles from The Eagle
- 1. "Wrong" Released: May 1990; 2. "The Eagle" Released: February 9, 1991

Professional ratings
Review scores
Source	Rating
AllMusic	2/5 stars

The Eagle is the thirty-eighth studio album by American country music artist Waylon Jennings, released on Epic Records in 1990. It was the first of his two solo albums on the label, which he joined after a two-year stay at MCA. This was also the last new Waylon Jennings album to be made available on LP; commercially in Europe, and only through the Columbia House record club in the US.

The selections themselves are a mixture of fast-paced songs and slower ballads. "Wrong", a humorous track about a relationship that turned awry, was Jennings' final top ten country hit, reaching #5 on the charts. The album also yielded the minor hits "What Bothers Me Most". Additionally, a music video for "Wrong", directed by Robert Deaton and George J. Flanigen IV, was filmed and released. The Eagle was the singer's final top ten record, reaching #9 on the country charts; it also briefly appeared on the pop charts, with its highest position being #172.

Jennings was less than charitable about his time at Epic, writing in his memoir that producer Bob Montgomery was "really hot to team me up with Willie," which would result in the Clean Shirt duet LP: "Bob eventually got his way by doing the Waylon and Willie Clean Shirt album, which Epic thought had too many Mexican horns. They didn't do much with my first album for them, The Eagle, either..."

Two of this album's songs were later recorded by other artists, both in 1996: "Her Man" on Gary Allan's debut album Used Heart for Sale, and "Where Corn Don't Grow" on Travis Tritt's album The Restless Kind. Both of these versions were released as singles that year.

== Release formats ==
Like most new album releases at the time, "The Eagle" was issued in the US on CD and cassette. However, it was briefly available on LP (Columbia 1P-8030) only to members of the Columbia House record club. In Europe, the album was commercially released (Epic 467260-1) on all three formats, though the LP version was deleted shortly after release in favor of the CD and cassette issues.

== Track listing ==
No.	Title	Writer(s)	Length
1.	"Workin' Cheap"	Troy Seals, Max D. Barnes	2:55
2.	"What Bothers Me Most"	Seals, Barnes	3:25
3.	"The Eagle"	Hank Cochran, Red Lane, Mack Vickery	2:55
4.	"Her Man"	Kent Robbins	2:42
5.	"Wrong"	Steve Seskin, Andre Pessis	2:58
6.	"Where Corn Don't Grow"	Roger Murrah, Mark Alan Springer	3:17
7.	"Reno and Me"	John Hadley, Kevin Welch	3:11
8.	"Too Close to Call"	Chester Lester	2:44
9.	"Waking Up with You"	Murrah, Waylon Jennings, Charlie Craig	2:34
10.	"Old Church Hymns and Nursery Rhymes"	Beth Nielsen Chapman	3:48

== Personnel ==
- Jerry Bridges - bass guitar, acoustic guitar
- Jimmy Capps - acoustic guitar, mandolin
- Paul Franklin - dobro, pedal steel guitar
- Jeff Hale - drums
- Kevin Hogan - bass guitar
- Waylon Jennings - acoustic guitar, electric guitar, lead vocals, background vocals
- Brent Mason - electric guitar
- Barry Walsh - keyboards

== Charts ==
=== Weekly charts ===
Chart (1990)	Peak position
US Billboard 200	172
US Top Country Albums (Billboard)	9

=== Year-end charts ===
Chart (1990)	Position
US Top Country Albums (Billboard)	53
Chart (1991)	Position
US Top Country Albums (Billboard)	57
