= Fallin' Never Felt So Good =

Single by Shawn Camp

from the album Shawn Camp
- B-side: "Turn Loose of My Pride"
- Released: July 31, 1993
- Genre: Country
- Length: 4:39
- Label: Reprise
- Songwriter(s): Shawn Camp, Will Smith
- Producer(s): Mark Wright

Shawn Camp singles chronology
"Fallin' Never Felt So Good" (1993)	"Confessin' My Love" (1993)

"Fallin' Never Felt So Good" is the debut single by American country music artist Shawn Camp. It was released in July 1993 as the first single from his eponymous debut album. The song was written by Camp and Will Smith. It reached No. 39 on the Billboard Hot Country Singles & Tracks chart. Before Camp's release, Dude Mowrey recorded the song on his 1991 debut album Honky Tonk.

Mark Chesnutt also released a version of the song from his 2000 album Lost in the Feeling, for MCA Nashville Records. Chesnutt's version was also a single, reaching No. 52 on the same chart that year. Like Camp's version, Chesnutt's was produced by Mark Wright.

== Chart performance ==
Chart (1993)	Peak position
US Hot Country Songs (Billboard)	39
Canadian RPM Country Tracks	64
