= Jo Hikk =

Canadian country music band

- Origin: Calgary, Alberta, Canada
- Genres: Country
- Years active: 2004–present
- Label: MDM Recordings
- Members: Kelly Sitter; Kenny Sitter; Al Doell; Don Jorgensen

Jo Hikk is a Canadian country music group founded in Calgary, Alberta. This four-piece band is composed of brothers Kelly Sitter (lead vocals, bass guitar) and Kenny Sitter (guitar, ganjo, vocals), Al Doell (drums, vocals) and Don Jorgensen (keyboards, mandolin). Their first album, Ride, was re-released in early 2009. Their first single, "Closer", charted in the Top 40. The song was written and originally recorded by Thrasher Shiver in 1996.

Jo Hikk scored two more hit singles with "My Kind Of Radio" and "Sweet City Woman" (cover version of a hit song by The Stampeders, both hit top #20), while another key track, "Pimp My Tractor," was placed on the Big Rock compilation. With the success of "Ride", Jo Hikk was nominated at the CCMA Awards 'Rising Star' three years in a row and for 'Group or Duo of the Year'.

Jo Hikk's second album, The Game, was released in August 2010. A music video was shot on location in Toronto with Warren P. Sonoda for the first single, "The Big Spoon".

== Discography ==
=== Albums ===
Title	Details
Ride	Release date: April 7, 2009; Label: Landis Productions
The Game	Release date: August 10, 2010; Label: MDM Recordings

=== Singles ===
Year	Single	Peak positions	Album
Year	Single	CAN Country	Album
2007	"Closer"	—	Ride
2008	"Pimp My Tractor"	—	Ride
2008	"Sweet City Woman"	23	Ride
2009	"My Kind of Radio"	17	Ride
2009	"Dancing with the Devil's Daughter"	34	Ride
2010	"Shame on the Moon"	—	Ride
2010	"The Big Spoon"	—	The Game
2010	"With a Smile Like That"	49	The Game
2011	"Not Even a Memory"	—	The Game
"—" denotes releases that did not chart

=== Music videos ===
Year	Video	Director
2009	"My Kind of Radio"	Warren P. Sonoda
2010	"The Big Spoon"	Warren P. Sonoda
2011	"Not Even a Memory"	

== Awards and nominations ==
Year	Association	Category	Result
2007	Canadian Country Music Association	Chevy Trucks Rising Star Award	Nominated
2008	Canadian Country Music Association	Top New Talent of the Year – Group or Duo	Nominated
2009	Canadian Country Music Association	Group or Duo of the Year	Nominated
2009	Canadian Country Music Association	Rising Star	Nominated
