= Stepping Stone (album) =

Studio album by Lari White
- Released: July 28, 1998
- Genre: Country
- Length: 44:41
- Label: Lyric Street
- Producer: Dann Huff

Lari White chronology
The Best of Lari White (1997)	Stepping Stone (1998)	Green Eyed Soul (2004)

Singles from Stepping Stone
- 1. "Stepping Stone" Released: May 4, 1998; 2. "Take Me" Released: September 21, 1998; 3. "John Wayne Walking Away" Released: March 29, 1999

Stepping Stone is the fourth studio album by American country music artist Lari White. It was released on July 28, 1998 via Lyric Street Records, her first album for the label and the then-new label's first release officially. Dann Huff produced this album. This was White's last album to primarily feature a country sound as later projects would infuse multiple different genres besides country music. Unlike her previous albums, Stepping Stone primarily features songs written by songwriters, with White only co-writing two of the album's songs.

== Background ==
Lyric Street senior vice president of A&R Doug Howard said of White's decision to work with Dann Huff, "When it came to producers, I had a short-list of one. It was Dann [Huff]. Then Lari agreed to meet with Dann and came back and said, 'I don't have to talk to anyone else.'"

The album contains three singles The title track became a US top-20 hit while also becoming White's only top-ten single on the Canada RPM Country Tracks chart. "Take Me" was her final top-forty on the US Hot Country Songs chart while "John Wayne Walking Away" failed to reach the top-fifty and became her final entry on the chart. After this record, White exited her label due to them not being satisfied with the material from what would become her fifth studio album Green Eyed Soul (2004).

The track "Only God Could Stop Me Loving You" was originally recorded by Billy Ray Cyrus on his 1994 album Storm in the Heartland. Canadian country music band Emerson Drive would later record the song for their 2002 debut album Emerson Drive and release it as a single. "You Can't Go Home Again (Flies on the Butter)" was later recorded as "Flies on the Butter (You Can't Go Home Again)" by Wynonna and Naomi Judd on Wynonna's 2003 album What the World Needs Now Is Love, from which it was released as a single.

== Critical reception ==
Professional ratings
Review scores
Source	Rating
AllMusic	4/5 stars
Lakeland Ledger	3/5 stars
Country Standard Time	(positive)

Stepping Stone received mostly favorable reviews from music critics. The book Contemporary Country gave the album a favorable review, saying that although most of the songs are "not worthy of her talent", she still made a fine body of work.

== Track listing ==
Stepping Stone track listing
No.	Title	Writer(s)	Length
1.	"John Wayne Walking Away"	Austin Cunningham; Jerry Boonstra; Doak Snead	4:47
2.	"Stepping Stone"	Lari White; David Kent; Craig Wiseman	3:29
3.	"That's What You Do"	Cunningham; Chuck Cannon	2:47
4.	"You Can't Go Home Again (Flies on the Butter)"	Cunningham; Cannon; Allen Shamblin	4:37
5.	"Only God Could Stop Me Loving You" (duet with Toby Keith)	Robert John "Mutt" Lange	4:17
6.	"On a Night Like This"	Deborah Allen; Chuck Jones	3:56
7.	"You Can't Take That from Me"	Tommy Lee James; Liz Hengber	3:24
8.	"This Is Love"	White; Cannon; Cunningham	3:08
9.	"Take Me"	Bob DiPiero; Stephony Smith	3:33
10.	"Tired"	Toby Keith; Cannon	4:41
11.	"Look Homeward Angel"	Cannon; Shamblin	6:03
Total length:			44:41

== Personnel ==
- Lari White — vocals
- Paul Leim — drums
- Mike Brignardello — bass guitar
- Biff Watson, Chuck Cannon — acoustic guitar
- Dann Huff, Jeff King — electric guitar
- Matt Rollings, John Hobbs, Steve Nathan — keyboards
- Dan Dugmore, Paul Franklin — steel guitar
- Aubrey Haynie — fiddle, mandolin
- Terry McMillan — percussion
- Steve Gibson — mandolin
- Chris Rodriguez, Lisa Cochran, Mary Ann Kennedy, Pam Rose — background vocals

== Charts ==
Chart (1998)	Peak position
US Top Country Albums (Billboard)	50
US Heatseekers Albums (Billboard)	38
