= Ready, Willing and Able (album) =

Studio album by Daron Norwood
- Released: March 28, 1995
- Genre: Country
- Length: 34:01
- Label: Giant
- Producers: Richard Landis, Jeff Carlton

Daron Norwood chronology
Daron Norwood (1994)	Ready, Willing and Able (1995)

Ready, Willing and Able is the second album of American country music singer Daron Norwood. It was released on March 28, 1995 via Giant Records. The album's singles, "Bad Dog, No Biscuit" and "My Girl Friday", failed to reach the Top 40 on the Hot Country Songs chart.

== Content ==
The title track was later recorded by Lari White on her 1996 album Don't Fence Me In. White's version was a number 20 hit on the country charts that year. "Between the Stones and Jones" was later recorded by Thrasher Shiver on their self-titled debut album.

"There'll Always Be a Honky Tonk Somewhere" was originally recorded by Randy Travis on his 1986 debut album Storms of Life.

== Critical reception ==
Chris Dickinson of New Country magazine gave the album 3 out of 5 stars, saying that Norwood's voice was "straightforward and honest". He also praised the "pumped-up production" and stated that the album had "plenty of hooks", but called "Bad Dog, No Biscuit" "dopey" and "When Mama Cried" derivative of "Love Without End, Amen".

== Track listing ==
1. "Bad Dog, No Biscuit" (William Kitchens, Richard Ferrell) — 2:30
2. "Ready, Willing and Able" (Jess Leary, Jody Alan Sweet) — 3:36
3. "When Mama Cried" (Daron Norwood, Wayne Perry) — 3:32
4. "You Could've Heard a Heartbreak" (Tim Johnson, Brett Jones) — 3:20
5. "My Girl Friday" (Carl Jackson, Curtis Wright) — 3:43
6. "Between the Stones and Jones" (Kim Tribble, Kim Williams, Cyril Rawson) — 2:53
7. "Try Getting Over You" (Craig Wiseman, Paul Nelson) — 4:27
8. "Break the Radio" (Gary Burr) — 2:42
9. "I Can't Strike That Match" (Gary Harrison, Tim Mensy) — 3:32
10. "There'll Always Be a Honky Tonk Somewhere" (Steve Clark, Johnny MacRae) — 3:46
