= Wishes (Lari White album) =

Studio album by Lari White
- Released: June 14, 1994
- Genre: Country
- Length: 36:26
- Label: RCA Nashville
- Producer: Garth Fundis

Lari White chronology
Lead Me Not (1993)	Wishes (1994)	Don't Fence Me In (1996)

Singles from Wishes
- 1. "That's My Baby" Released: March 1994; 2. "Now I Know" Released: August 15, 1994; 3. "That's How You Know (When You're in Love)" Released: January 16, 1995

Wishes is the second studio album by American country music artist Lari White, released on June 14, 1994 via RCA Nashville Records. It contains three singles: "That's My Baby", "Now I Know", and "That's How You Know (When You're in Love)", all of which were Top 10 hits on the Billboard Hot Country Singles & Tracks (now Hot Country Songs) charts.

== Content ==
White wrote "That's My Baby" with her husband, songwriter Chuck Cannon. According to her, the song was climbing the charts when the two were on honeymoon. The album itself received RIAA gold certification in the United States.

== Critical reception ==
Professional ratings
Review scores
Source	Rating
AllMusic	4.5/5 stars
Entertainment Weekly	B

In a review for AllMusic, Johnny Loftus wrote that "Wishes was Lari White's breakthrough release, and it's easy to hear why.", singling out several tracks that "showcase [her] torchy vocal". Commenting on the album's musicians, Loftus described them as "[giving] each track a ground-level feel that's often missing from top-line Nashville releases." He concluded the review by saying that "Wishes is a solid home run of an album with much more to offer than simply its singles.

== Track listing ==
Wishes track listing
No.	Title	Writer(s)	Length
1.	"That's My Baby"	Lari White; Chuck Cannon	3:27
2.	"Somebody's Fool"	White; Tom Shapiro; Chris Waters	3:21
3.	"Wishes"	White; Cannon	3:03
4.	"Now I Know"	Chick Rains; Cindy Greene; Don Cook	4:31
5.	"If I'm Not Already Crazy"	Verlon Thompson; Suzi Ragsdale	4:45
6.	"That's How You Know (When You're in Love)"	White; Cannon	3:39
7.	"When It Rains"	White	3:45
8.	"Go On"	White; Shapiro; Waters	3:39
9.	"It's Love"	White; Cannon	3:18
10.	"If You Only Knew"	White; Cannon	2:58
Total length:			36:26

Note

- Track 9 omitted from cassette version.

== Personnel ==
Adapted from the album's liner notes.

- Lari White – lead vocals (all tracks), harmony vocals (tracks 1, 2, 4, 7, 9)
- Richard Bennett – acoustic guitar (track 4), requinto (track 5)
- Chuck Cannon – harmony vocals (tracks 4, 7)
- Stuart Duncan – fiddle (tracks 3, 5, 8, 9), mandolin (track 5)
- Paul Franklin – steel guitar (tracks 1–5, 7, 8, 10), pedabro (tracks 1, 4, 8)
- Garth Fundis – producer (all tracks), harmony vocals (tracks 1, 2)
- John Gardner – drums (tracks 2, 4–7, 10)
- John Hobbs – piano (tracks 6, 10)
- Hal Ketchum – harmony vocals (track 6)
- Larry Knechtel – piano (tracks 2, 7)
- Chris Leuzinger – electric guitar (track 2)
- Mark Luna – harmony vocals (tracks 1, 8)
- Brent Mason – electric guitar (tracks 1, 3–6, 8–10)
- Steve Nathan – piano (tracks 1, 3–5), keyboards (tracks 1, 4, 8), organ (track 9)
- Dave Pomeroy – bass guitar (all tracks)
- Dean Rose – electric guitar (track 8)
- Vince Santoro – drums (tracks 1, 3, 8, 9)
- Stephony Smith – harmony vocals (tracks 1, 4, 8)
- Verlon Thompson – acoustic guitar (track 5), harmony vocals (track 5)
- Billy Joe Walker Jr. – acoustic guitar (tracks 2, 6, 7, 10), gut string guitar (track 10)
- Biff Watson – acoustic guitar (tracks 1, 3, 8, 9)

== Charts ==
=== Weekly charts ===
Chart (1994–1995)	Peak position
US Billboard 200	125
US Top Country Albums (Billboard)	24
US Heatseekers Albums (Billboard)	1

=== Year-end charts ===
Chart (1995)	Position
US Top Country Albums (Billboard)	53

== Certifications ==
Region	Certification	Certified units/sales
United States (RIAA)	Gold	500,000^{^}
^{^} Shipments figures based on certification alone.
