= She's Going Home with Me =

Single by Travis Tritt

from the album The Restless Kind
- Released: April 19, 1997
- Genre: Country
- Length: 3:35
- Label: Warner Bros. Nashville
- Songwriter: Travis Tritt
- Producers: Don Was, Travis Tritt

Travis Tritt singles chronology
"Here's Your Sign (Get the Picture)" (1997)	"She's Going Home with Me" (1997)	"Helping Me Get Over You" (1997)

"She's Going Home with Me" is a song written and recorded by American country music artist Travis Tritt. It was released in April 1997 as the third single from the album The Restless Kind. The song reached number 24 on the Billboard Hot Country Singles & Tracks chart.

== Content ==
Tritt said in an article with Billboard that the song was an example of his personal involvement in The Restless Kind, as he co-produced it, played electric guitar on it, and sang his own harmony vocals.

== Critical reception ==
A review of the single in the same magazine was favorable, saying that it "boasts an infectious, retro-spiced groove" and "has a driving feel, reminiscent of Johnny Rivers' Memphis."

== Chart performance ==
Chart (1997)	Peak position
Canada Country Singles (RPM)	17
US Hot Country Songs (Billboard)	24
