= Stepping Stone (Lari White song) =

Single by Lari White

from the album Stepping Stone
- B-side: "Tired"
- Released: May 4, 1998
- Studio: Masterfonics – The Tracking Room (Nashville, TN)
- Genre: Country
- Length: 3:29
- Label: Lyric Street
- Songwriters: Lari White; David Kent; Craig Wiseman
- Producer: Dann Huff

Lari White singles chronology
"Helping Me Get Over You" (1997)	"Stepping Stone" (1998)	"Take Me" (1998)

"Stepping Stone" is a song by American country music artist Lari White, written by White, David Kent, and Craig Wiseman. It was released on May 4, 1998, via country radio as the lead single to her fourth studio album of the same name (1998) by Lyric Street Records and was the label's first official release. It is one of the album's two tracks she co-wrote. A video was not released.

The track became a decent success for White, hitting number 16 on the US Hot Country Songs chart and number 10 on the Canada RPM Country Tracks, becoming White's only top-ten single in Canada. It also became White's only song to enter the Billboard Hot 100, hitting number 76. The track later received an ASCAP award for its writers.

== Background ==
At the time of the song's writing, White had left her previous record deal with RCA Records Nashville when co-writer David Kent e-mailed her a poem titled "Stepping Stone". She and Craig Wiseman later finished the song. Randy Goodman, founder of Lyric Street Records took an interest in making her his flagship artist for the then-new record label after the success of her song "Helping Me Get Over You" with Travis Tritt. Upon her singing with Lyric Street Records in early 1998, the label selected "Stepping Stone" as a single, thus making it the label's first release.

== Content ==
According to sheet music published on Musicnotes.com, "Stepping Stone" is played in the key of G major and a metronome of 80. The track is an empowerment anthem that uses life's obstacles as stepping stones.

== Critical reception ==
Deborah Evans Price of Billboard magazine gave the track a positive review saying, "The marriage of strong percussion and jangly guitars makes for a thoroughly engaging track. Country radio programmers should welcome this with open arms." Paulette Flowers of Portsmouth Daily Times said it was White singing at her best.

== Chart performance ==
"Stepping Stone" debuted at number 62 on the US Billboard Hot Country Songs chart the week of May 16, 1998. It reached the top-forty the week of June 6, 1998, at number 38, becoming her sixth top-forty hit. It peaked at number 16 on the chart for the week of August 22, 1998. It spent 20 weeks in total on the chart.

== Track listing ==
7-inch, CD, and cassette single

1. "Stepping Stone" – 3:29
2. "Tired" – 4:50

== Personnel ==
Taken from the Stepping Stone booklet.

- Paul Leim – drums
- Mike Brignardello – bass guitar
- Biff Watson – acoustic guitar
- Dann Huff – electric guitar
- John Hobbs – Hammond B3 organ
- Paul Franklin – steel guitar
- Aubrey Haynie – fiddle
- Terry McMillan – percussion
- Lisa Cochran and Chris Rodriguez – background vocals
- Lari White – background vocals and vocal arrangement

== Charts ==
=== Weekly charts ===
Weekly chart performance for "Stepping Stone"
Chart (1998)	Peak position
Canada Country Singles (RPM)	10
US Billboard Hot 100	73
US Hot Country Songs (Billboard)	16
US Hot Singles Sales (Billboard)	50
US Top Country Singles Sales (Billboard)	7
US Country Top 50 (Radio & Records)	12

=== Year-end charts ===
1998 year-end chart performance for "Stepping Stone"
Chart (1998)	Position
Canada Country Tracks (RPM)	75
US Top Country Singles Sales (Billboard)	25
US Country Songs (Billboard)	77
US Country (Radio & Records)	76
