= Lead Me Not =

Studio album by Lari White
- Released: April 27, 1993
- Genre: Country
- Length: 34:35
- Label: RCA Nashville
- Producer: Rodney Crowell; Steuart Smith; Lari White

Lari White chronology
Lead Me Not (1993)	Wishes (1994)

Singles from Lead Me Not
- 1. "What a Woman Wants" Released: February 1, 1993; 2. "Lead Me Not" Released: April 1993; 3. "Lay Around and Love on You" Released: August 1993

Professional ratings
Review scores
Source	Rating
AllMusic	4.5/5 stars
Entertainment Weekly	A−

Lead Me Not is the debut album by American country music artist Lari White. It was issued on April 27, 1993, on the Nashville division of RCA Records. White produced the album along with Rodney Crowell and Eagles guitarist Steuart Smith. In addition, she wrote or co-wrote eight of the album's ten tracks.

The album's three singles — "What a Woman Wants", the title track, and "Lay Around and Love on You" — all charted on the Billboard Hot Country Singles & Tracks chart, although all three failed to make the top forty of the chart. Although the album failed to enter the US Top Country Albums chart, it did peak at number 36 on the Billboard Top Heatseekers chart.

In 2020, it was reported that the official music video for "Lead Me Not" had gone missing. According to the piece, the record label claimed to have no knowledge of the music video and no copy of the video production in their vault.

== Track listing ==
"Anything Goes" is excluded from the cassette version of the album.

Lead Me Not track listing
No.	Title	Writer(s)	Length
1.	"Itty Bitty Single Solitary Piece O' My Heart"	Lari White; John Rotch	3:28
2.	"Just Thinking"	White	3:30
3.	"Lay Around and Love on You"	Bobby David; David Gillon	2:54
4.	"Lead Me Not"	White	4:06
5.	"Made to Be Broken"	White	3:56
6.	"What a Woman Wants"	White; Chuck Cannon	3:04
7.	"Anything Goes"	Suzi Ragsdale; Verlon Thompson	3:10
8.	"When the Lights Are Low"	White; Chris Waters	2:54
9.	"Don't Leave Me Lonely"	White; Cannon	3:29
10.	"Good Good Love"	White; Rotch	4:04
Total length:			34:35

== Personnel ==
Adapted from Lead Me Not liner notes.

- Dale Armstrong - percussion (5), tea steeper (7), entry bell (7), "more rockin' bongos" (7)
- Joy Askew - harmony vocals (8, 10)
- Eddie Bayers - drums (2, 4, 8)
- Larry Byrom - electric guitar (10)
- Chuck Cannon - harmony vocals (3, 4)
- Rodney Crowell - "super evolved" harmony vocal (7)
- Jerry Douglas - Dobro (1)
- Radney Foster - "tag team" harmony vocal (4)
- Robert Greenidge - steel drums (7)
- Jim Horn - tenor saxophone (4)
- John Barlow Jarvis - piano (3), "Wurlitzer-ish" (3)
- Randy Leago - organ (3), accordion (7)
- Albert Lee - electric guitar (1, 2, 6, 7, 8, 10), acoustic guitar (4, 7), Korg T3 (5)
- Mark Luna - "ridiculously high" harmony vocals (1), harmony vocals (3)
- Terry McMillan - harmonica (3)
- Bill Payne - "gumbo piano" (1), piano (2, 4, 5, 6, 8, 9, 10), Hammond organ (6), Korg T3 (7), organ (10)
- Michael Rhodes - bass guitar (1, 2, 3, 4, 6, 8, 9, 10), fretless bass (5, 7)
- Vince Santoro - drums (1, 3, 5, 6, 10), cowbell (1), harmony vocals (3, 6, 10), kick drum (7), claves (7), cymbals (7)
- Stephony Smith - harmony vocals (1, 4)
- Steuart Smith - electric guitar (1, 4, 5, 8, 10), acoustic guitar (1, 2, 5, 7, 8, 10), all guitars (3), classical guitar (5)
- Tommy Spurlock - pedal steel guitar (8)
- Russ Taff - "featured soul vocal" (10)
- Jonathan Yudkin - violin (8)

Strings on "Just Thinking" and "Don't Leave Me Lonely"

Connie Ellisor, John Catchings, Anthony LaMarchina, Bob Mason, Julia Tanner, Jim Grosjean, Kathryn Plummer, Kristin Wilkinson, David Davidson, Carl Gorodetzky, Lee Larrison, Ted Madsen, Laura Molyneaux, Pamela Sixfin, Alan Umstead

"RC and the Moonpie Choir" on "Good Good Love"

Rodney Crowell, Vince Santoro, Joy Askew, Stephony Smith, Mark Luna, Russ Taff, Jonell Mosser, Connie Reeder, Chuck Cannon, Jackie Welch, Claudia Church, Peter Penrose, Lari White

Technical

- Donivan Cowart - recording
- Rodney Crowell - producer
- Glenn Meadows - mastering
- Roger Nichols - engineer, recording, mixing
- Stephony Smith - producer
- Bergen White - string arrangement (2, 9)
- Lari White - producer

== Charts ==
Chart (1993)	Peak position
US Heatseekers Albums (Billboard)	36
