= The Eagle (song) =

Single by Waylon Jennings

from the album The Eagle
- B-side: "What Bothers Me Most"
- Released: February 9, 1991
- Genre: Country
- Length: 2:51
- Label: Epic
- Songwriters: Mack Vickery, Hank Cochran, Red Lane
- Producers: Richie Albright, Bob Montgomery

Waylon Jennings singles chronology
"What Bothers Me Most" (1990)	"The Eagle" (1991)	"Too Dumb for New York City" (1991)

"The Eagle" is a song written by Mack Vickery, Hank Cochran and Red Lane, and recorded by American country music artist Waylon Jennings. It was released in February 1991 as the third single and title track from the 1990 album The Eagle. The song reached #22 on the Billboard Hot Country Singles & Tracks chart, Jennings's last Top 40 hit. It was covered by Jamey Johnson and George Strait for Johnson's album Living for a Song: A Tribute to Hank Cochran.

== Chart performance ==
Chart (1991)	Peak position
Canada Country Singles (RPM)	20
US Hot Country Songs (Billboard)	22
