= Still in Love with You (Travis Tritt song) =

Single by Travis Tritt

from the album The Restless Kind
- Released: November 22, 1997
- Genre: Country
- Length: 3:22
- Label: Warner Bros. Nashville
- Songwriter: Travis Tritt
- Producers: Don Was, Travis Tritt

Travis Tritt singles chronology
"Helping Me Get Over You" (1997)	"Still in Love with You" (1997)	"If I Lost You" (1998)

"Still in Love with You" is a song written and recorded by American country music artist Travis Tritt. It was released in November 1997 as the fifth and final single from the album The Restless Kind. The song reached #23 on the Billboard Hot Country Singles & Tracks chart.

== Chart performance ==
Chart (1997–1998)	Peak position
Canada Country Singles (RPM)	13
US Hot Country Songs (Billboard)	23
