= Dude Mowrey =

American musician

- Birth name: Daniel Mowrey
- Born: February 10, 1972 (age 53)
- Origin: Fort Lauderdale, Florida, United States
- Genres: Country
- Occupation: Singer
- Instrument: Vocals
- Years active: 1991–1994; 2002–present
- Labels: Capitol Nashville, Arista Nashville

Maybe You Were The One
30-second clip of Dude Mowrey's song "Maybe You Were The One"

Daniel "Dude" Mowrey (born February 10, 1972, in Fort Lauderdale, Florida) is an American country music artist. Between 1991 and 1993, Mowrey recorded two studio albums, both on major labels: 1991's Honky Tonk on Capitol Records Nashville, and 1993's Dude Mowrey on Arista Nashville. These albums produced four singles for Mowrey on the Hot Country Songs charts. The first of these, "Cowboys Don't Cry", was later a Top 40 hit when Daron Norwood recorded it for his debut album three years after Mowrey's version. Another cut, "Fallin' Never Felt So Good", was later recorded by both Shawn Camp and Mark Chesnutt.

Country singer Mel Tillis discovered Mowrey in the mid-1980s while Mowrey was still in his mid-teens; Tillis also served as Mowrey's manager, and helped the singer sign to Capitol in 1991. Mowrey's debut album, Honky Tonk, was released in 1991. Included on it was the single "Cowboys Don't Cry", as well as "Honky Tonk Song", a song which Tillis initially wrote for Webb Pierce. By 1993, Mowrey had transferred to Arista Nashville, releasing a self-titled album that year, as well as three more singles. Arista label mate Lee Roy Parnell made a guest appearance in Mowrey's music video for the song "Hold on Elroy" which was filmed at an old cabin just outside Nashville, TN.

== Discography ==
=== Honky Tonk (1991) ===
Honky Tonk

Studio album by Dude Mowrey
- Released: April 15, 1991
- Studio: Sound Stage Studios, Nashville TN
- Genre: Country
- Length: 29:30
- Label: Capitol Nashville No. 95085
- Producer: Jimmy Bowen, Dude Mowrey

==== Track listing ====
1. "Honky Tonk Song" (Mel Tillis, Buck Peddy) – 1:57
2. "It Could've Been Me" (Curt Ryle, Johnny Park) – 3:38
3. "Cowboys Don't Cry" (Jim Allison, Bob Simon, Doug Gilmore, Jeff Raymond) – 2:34
4. "Heartbreak Train" (Roger Murrah, J.D. Martin) – 3:12
5. "Fallin' Never Felt So Good" (Shawn Camp, Will Smith) – 2:22
6. "If I Ever Love Again" (Curtis Wright, Billy Spencer) – 3:41
7. "Good Lookin'" (Mickey Jupp, Chris East) – 2:49
8. "The Rest of Forever" (Jim Martin) – 3:24
9. "We Got Love" (Kent Robbins) – 3:00
10. "Do You Want to Make Something of It?" (Wright, T.J. Knight) – 2:53

=== Dude Mowrey (1993) ===
Dude Mowrey

Studio album by Dude Mowrey
- Released: June 8, 1993
- Genre: Country
- Length: 32:12
- Label: Arista Nashville No. 18678
- Producer: Mike Clute, Tim DuBois

==== Track listing ====
1. "Maybe You Were the One" (Robert Bruce Landis, Hunter Moore) – 3:28
2. "Dr. Wurlitzer" (Jeff Crossan) – 2:37
3. "Walk Away" (Marc Beeson, Robert Byrne) – 4:02
4. "Somewhere in Between" (Allen Shamblin, Jon Vezner) – 2:55
5. "Happy Ever After (Comes One Day at a Time)" (Gary Nicholson, Kevin Welch) – 3:35
6. "What Kind of Memories Remain" (Joe Doyle, Rick Peoples) – 2:52
7. "Hold On, Elroy" (Dennis Linde) – 2:59
8. "View from the Bottom" (Dude Mowrey, Ralph Murthy) – 3:35
9. "I'll Never Listen to That Fool Again" (Larry Martin, Stan Munsey) – 3:36
10. "Turn for the Worse" (Frank Dycus, Kerry Kurt Phillips, Billy Yates) – 2:38

=== Singles ===
| Year | Single | Peak chart positions | | Album |
| Year | Single | US Country | CAN Country | Album |
|---|---|---|---|---|
| 1991 | "Honky Tonk Song" | — | — | Honky Tonk |
| 1991 | "Cowboys Don't Cry" | 65 | — | Honky Tonk |
| 1993 | "Maybe You Were the One" | 57 | 87 | Dude Mowrey |
| 1993 | "Hold On, Elroy" | 69 | 82 | Dude Mowrey |
| 1994 | "Somewhere in Between" | 57 | 46 | Dude Mowrey |
"—" denotes releases that did not chart

=== Music videos ===
| Year | Video | Director |
|---|---|---|
| 1993 | "Maybe You Were the One" | Martin Kahan |
| 1993 | "Hold On, Elroy" | |
| 1994 | "Somewhere in Between" | chris rogers [sic] |
