= My First Affair =

Soundtrack album by Lari White
- Released: April 6, 2007
- Genre: Cabaret
- Label: Skinny WhiteGirl Records
- Producer: Lari White

My First Affair was a cabaret show and the soundtrack later released by American Broadway-country-gospel artist Lari White.

== Show ==
The cabaret show was at the Oak Room cabaret at the Algonquin Hotel in Manhattan, New York City, on February 12, 2007. The show included a mix of pop, country, gospel and Broadway songs including several original compositions by White. The album was released on April 6, 2007 on Skinny White Girl Records.

== Track listing ==
1. “Please Be Kind/ Gotta Have Me Go With You” (Sammy Kahn, Saul Chapman/ Harold Arlen, Ira Gershwin) - 2:30
2. “There’s A Terrific Band” (Alan Bergman, Marilyn Bergman, Billy Goldenberg) - 3:32
3. “Doatsy Mae” (Carol Hall) - 3:12
4. “Minor Changes” (Lari White) - 2:14
5. “Museums” (Steven Lutvak) - 4:33
6. “Forgiveness’ Embrace” (Stephen Schwartz) - 4:00
7. “Love Me or Leave Me” (Walter Donaldson, Gus Kahn) - 2:15
8. Richard Rogers Medley: “Falling in Love With Love” (Richard Rodgers, Lorenz Hart) / “A Cockeyed Optimist” (Oscar Hammerstein II, Richard Rodgers) - 2:49
9. “Over and Over” (Lari White) - 3:46
10. “It Ain’t My Business” (DeSpain, Anderson-Lopez) - 3:26
11. Yentl Medley: “Where is it Written?” (Alan Bergman, Marilyn Bergman, Michel Legrand) / “No Wonder” (Alan Bergman, Marilyn Bergman, Michel Legrand)/ “A Piece of Sky” (Alan Bergman, Marilyn Bergman, Michel Legrand) - 6:42
12. “It’s A New World” (Ira Gershwin, Harold Arlen) - 2:04

== Production ==
- Producer: Lari White
- Recorded Live by: Chris Herles and Jean Pierre Perreaux At the Metropolitan Room at Gotham, courtesy Chris Mazzilli
- Directed by: Eric Michael Gillett
- Piano: Don Rebic
- Bass: Steve Doyle
