= Shawn Camp (singer) =

American singer-songwriter

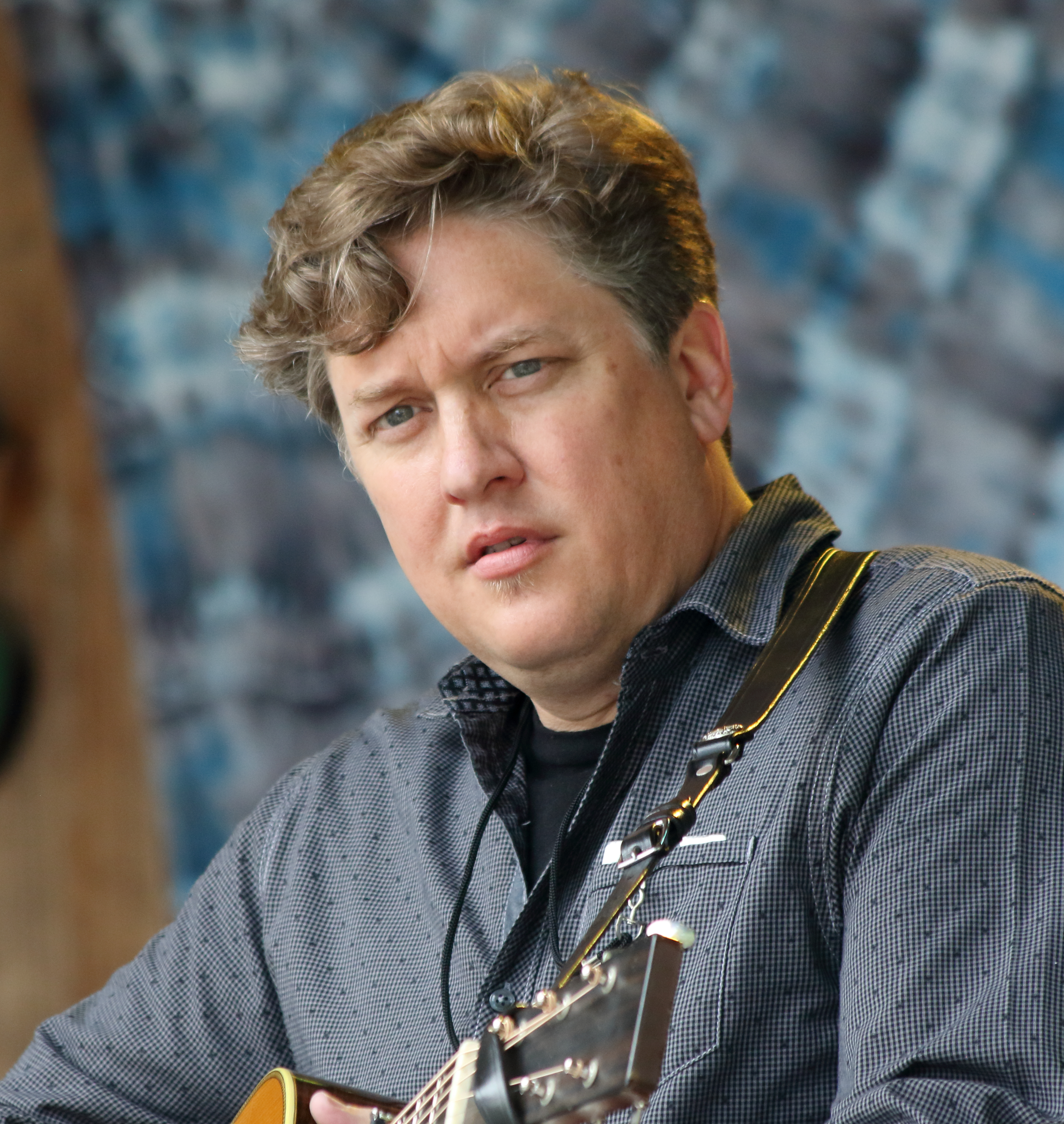
- Performing at Suwannee Springtime Reunion, March 22, 2018

Background information
- Born: Darrell DeShawn Camp; August 29, 1966 (age 59)
- Origin: Perryville, Arkansas, US
- Genres: Country, bluegrass, Americana
- Occupation: Singer-songwriter
- Instruments: Vocals, guitar, fiddle
- Years active: 1991–present
- Labels: Reprise, Skeeterbit, Oh Boy
- Member of: The Earls of Leicester
- Partner: Lisa Stewart (2021-2023)
- Website: shawncamp.com

Darrell DeShawn Camp (born August 29, 1966) is an American musician who performs country and Americana music. Originally signed to Reprise Records in 1993 as a recording artist, Camp charted two minor singles on the U.S. Billboard Hot Country Singles & Tracks charts that year. Since then he has found success as a songwriter, having co-written hit singles for many country music artists, including Willie Nelson, Garth Brooks, Josh Turner, Brooks & Dunn, and Blake Shelton, although he continues to record his own material as well. The 2023 Grammy Awards presented Willie Nelson's A Beautiful Time with "Country Album of The Year". The title cut, along with album cut, "We're Not Happy ('Til You're Not Happy)", were both penned by Camp.

== Biography ==
Camp was raised in Perryville, Arkansas by a musical family. In 1987, he moved to Nashville and worked in the backing bands of acts including The Grand Prairie Boys, Osborne Brothers, Alan Jackson, Suzy Bogguss, and Trisha Yearwood. In 1991, he was signed to Reprise Records, with two minor Top 40 singles charting in 1993. The first of these, "Fallin' Never Felt So Good", was previously recorded by Dude Mowrey.

Camp recorded a second album for Reprise, but never released it due to creative differences. He then began writing for other artists. Camp's first Number One as a songwriter came in early 1998, when Garth Brooks reached the top of the Billboard country charts with "Two Piña Coladas", a song co-written by Camp. Later in the same year, Brooks & Dunn reached Number One with "How Long Gone", another Camp co-write.

Camp released Lucky Silver Dollar in 2001. In 2006, he was nominated as Songwriter of the Year by the Society for the Preservation of Bluegrass Music; also, Billboard ranked him No.10 on their 2006 list of Hot Country Songwriters. In the same year, two songs co-written by Camp entered the country charts: "Nobody But Me" by Blake Shelton, and "Would You Go with Me" by Josh Turner, which peaked at No.4 and No.1, respectively, on the Billboard U.S. Hot Country Songs charts. Camp also co-wrote Turner's 2007 single "Firecracker", George Strait's 2008 single "River of Love", and Billy Currington's 2011 single "Love Done Gone".

Since early 2007, Camp had been collaborating with country singer-songwriter Loretta Lynn writing songs such as "I'm Dyin' for Someone to Live For" and "I'm More Alone When I'm With You" together. Camp has featured some of the photographs taken at the Cash Cabin Studio in Hendersonville, Tennessee which many believe means he is going to be duetting on some of Lynn's upcoming albums. The pair usually wrote together at Lynn's home in Hurricane Mills, Tennessee (known as The Loretta Lynn Dude Ranch.)

In September 2010, Reprise Records issued the previously unreleased 1994 album, retitled 1994.

In 2012, Camp won Album of the Year at the American Music Awards for his co production with Tamara Saviano of This One's for Him: A Tribute to Guy Clark.

In 2013, Camp became the lead vocalist for The Earls of Leicester and he has been a session musician.

In January 2014, Camp won a Grammy Award for his production of Guy Clark's album My Favorite Picture of You. This was his second Grammy nomination for Best Folk Album of the Year, in December, 2012, he and co-producer Tamara Saviano, were nominated for This One's for Him: A Tribute to Guy Clark.

The 2023 Grammy Awards presented Willie Nelson's A Beautiful Time with "Country Album of The Year". The title cut, along with album cut, "We're Not Happy 'Til You're Not Happy", were both penned by Camp.

== Discography ==
=== Albums ===
Title	Album details	Peak chart positions	
Title	Album details	US Country	US Heat
Shawn Camp	Release date: October 26, 1993; Label: Reprise Records	61	27
Lucky Silver Dollar	Release date: August 7, 2001; Label: Skeeterbit	—	—
Live at the Station Inn	Release date: August 31, 2004; Label: Oh Boy Records	—	—
Fireball	Release date: March 21, 2006; Label: Skeeterbit	—	—
The Bluegrass Elvises, Vol. 1 (with Billy Burnette)	Release date: August 7, 2007; Label: American	—	—
1994	Release date: September 28, 2010; Label: Warner/Reprise	—	—
The Ghost of Sis Draper	Release date: September 12, 2025; Label: Truly Handmade	—	—

=== Singles ===
Year	Single	Peak chart positions		Album
Year	Single	US Country	CAN Country	Album
1993	"Fallin' Never Felt So Good"	39	64	Shawn Camp
1994	"Confessin' My Love"	39	51	Shawn Camp
1994	"Man, What a Woman"	—	72	Shawn Camp
"—" denotes releases that did not chart

=== Music videos ===
Year	Video	Director
1993	"Fallin' Never Felt So Good"	Steven Goldmann
1994	"Confessin' My Love"	Steven Goldmann
2006	"Waitin' for the Day to Break"	
