= Now I Know (Lari White song) =

Single by Lari White

from the album Wishes
- B-side: "It's Love"
- Released: August 15, 1994
- Genre: Country
- Length: 4:31
- Label: RCA Nashville
- Songwriters: Cindy Greene; Don Cook; Chick Rains
- Producer: Garth Fundis

Lari White singles chronology
"That's My Baby" (1994)	"Now I Know" (1994)	"That's How You Know (When You're in Love)" (1995)

"Now I Know" is a song written by Cindy Greene, Don Cook and Chick Rains, and recorded by American country music artist Lari White. It was released on August 15, 1994 as the second single from her second studio album Wishes (1994). The song reached number 5 on the US Billboard Hot Country Singles & Tracks chart, becoming her highest-ever charting single.

== Critical reception ==
A favorable review came from Cash Box magazine, whose reviewer Richard McVey wrote that it "is a song rich lyrically and vocally."

== Charts ==
Chart (1994)	Peak position
Canada Country Singles (RPM)	12
US Hot Country Songs (Billboard)	5
