= That's My Baby (song) =

- US cassette single cover

Single by Lari White

from the album Wishes
- B-side: "Where the Lights Are Low"
- Released: April 9, 1994
- Genre: Country
- Length: 3:26
- Label: RCA Nashville
- Songwriters: Lari White, Chuck Cannon
- Producer: Garth Fundis

Lari White singles chronology
| "Lay Around and Love on You" (1993) | "That's My Baby" (1994) | "Now I Know" (1994) |

"That's My Baby" is a song co-written and recorded by American country music artist Lari White. It was released in April 1994 as the first single from the album Wishes. The song reached number 10 on the Billboard Hot Country Singles & Tracks chart. It was written by White and Chuck Cannon.

== Chart performance ==
| Chart (1994) | Peak position |
|---|---|
| Canada Country Singles (RPM) | 23 |
| US Hot Country Songs (Billboard) | 10 |
