= Helping Me Get Over You =

Single by Travis Tritt with Lari White

from the album The Restless Kind
- Released: July 26, 1997
- Genre: Country
- Length: 4:09
- Label: Warner Bros. Nashville
- Songwriters: Travis Tritt; Lari White
- Producers: Travis Tritt; Don Was

Travis Tritt singles chronology
"She's Going Home with Me" (1997)	"Helping Me Get Over You" (1997)	"Still in Love with You" (1997)

Lari White singles chronology
"Wild at Heart" (1996)	"Helping Me Get Over You" (1997)	"Stepping Stone" (1998)

"Helping Me Get Over You" is a song written and recorded by American country music artists Travis Tritt and Lari White. It was released in July 1997 as the fourth single from Tritt's album The Restless Kind. The song reached No. 18 on the Billboard Hot Country Singles & Tracks chart. It was nominated for a TNN/MCN Music award that year.

== Content ==
The song is a slow ballad with an approximate tempo of 76 beats per minute. It begins with Tritt singing the first verse and chorus in the key of F major, then modulates downward to B-flat major for White, who sings the second verse and chorus. It includes piano, timpani, and a four-piece string section arranged by David Campbell.

== Personnel ==
Compiled from The Restless Kind liner notes.

- Kenny Aronoff - drums
- Sam Bacco - timpani, percussion
- Mike Brignardello - bass guitar
- Larry Byrom - acoustic guitar
- David Campbell - viola
- Wendell Cox - electric guitar
- Joel Derouin - violin
- Suzy Katayama - cello
- Peter Kent - violin
- Mark O'Connor - fiddle
- Benmont Tench - piano, C-3 organ
- Travis Tritt - vocals, acoustic guitar
- Robby Turner - pedal steel guitar
- Lari White - vocals
- Reggie Young - electric guitar

== Chart performance ==
Chart (1997)	Peak position
Canada Country Singles (RPM)	21
US Hot Country Songs (Billboard)	18
