= Ready, Willing and Able (Daron Norwood song) =

Single by Lari White

from the album Don't Fence Me In
- B-side: "Don't Fence Me In"
- Released: December 16, 1995
- Genre: Country
- Length: 3:10
- Label: RCA Nashville
- Songwriters: Jess Leary, Jody Alan Sweet
- Producers: Josh Leo, Lari White

Lari White singles chronology
"That's How You Know (When You're in Love)" (1996)	"Ready, Willing and Able" (1995)	"Wild at Heart" (1996)

"Ready, Willing and Able" is a song written by Jess Leary and Jody Alan Sweet. It was first recorded in 1994 by Daron Norwood for his 1995 Giant Records album of the same name.

It was later recorded by Lari White. Released in December 1995, White's version was the first single from the album Don't Fence Me In. The song reached number 20 on the Billboard Hot Country Singles & Tracks chart.

== Chart performance ==
Chart (1995–1996)	Peak position
Canada Country Singles (RPM)	14
US Hot Country Songs (Billboard)	20
