= The Restless Kind =

Studio album by Travis Tritt
- Released: August 27, 1996
- Genre: Country
- Length: 40:31
- Label: Warner Bros. Nashville
- Producer: Travis Tritt; Don Was

Travis Tritt chronology
Greatest Hits: From the Beginning (1995)	The Restless Kind (1996)	No More Looking Over My Shoulder (1998)

Singles from The Restless Kind
- 1. "More Than You'll Ever Know" Released: July 15, 1996; 2. "Where Corn Don't Grow" Released: November 25, 1996; 3. "She's Going Home with Me" Released: April 19, 1997; 4. "Helping Me Get Over You" Released: July 26, 1997; 5. "Still in Love with You" Released: November 22, 1997

Professional ratings
Review scores
Source	Rating
AllMusic	4.5/5 stars
Entertainment Weekly	B+

The Restless Kind is American country music artist Travis Tritt's fifth studio album, released on Warner Bros. Records in 1996. The tracks "More Than You'll Ever Know", "Helping Me Get Over You" (a duet with Lari White), "She's Going Home with Me", and "Where Corn Don't Grow" were released as singles, all peaking in the Top 40 on the country charts. "Where Corn Don't Grow" was previously recorded by Waylon Jennings on his 1990 album The Eagle, and was his #67-peaking single that year. "Double Trouble" was a duet with Tritt's long-time friend and recording partner Marty Stuart.

== Track listing ==
CD
No.	Title	Writer(s)	Duet Partner	Length
1.	"The Restless Kind"	Mike Henderson		3:22
2.	"Still in Love with You"	Travis Tritt		3:22
3.	"More Than You'll Ever Know"	Tritt		3:23
4.	"Draggin' My Heart Around"	Marty Stuart, Paul Kennerley		3:27
5.	"Helping Me Get Over You"	Tritt, Lari White	Lari White	4:08
6.	"Back Up Against the Wall"	Buddy Buie, J.R. Cobb		3:47
7.	"Double Trouble"	Stuart, Tritt, Kennerley	Marty Stuart	3:15
8.	"Did You Fall Far Enough"	Tritt, Troy Seals		4:35
9.	"She's Going Home with Me"	Tritt		3:37
10.	"Sack Full of Stones"	Tritt, Stuart		4:01
11.	"Where Corn Don't Grow"	Roger Murrah, Mark Alan Springer		3:28
Total length:				40:25

== Personnel ==
- Kenny Aronoff - drums, percussion
- Sam Bacco - percussion, timpani
- Mike Brignardello - bass guitar
- Larry Byrom - acoustic guitar
- David Campbell - string arrangements
- Wendell Cox - electric guitar
- Joel Derouin - violin
- Mark Goldenberg - acoustic guitar
- Portia Griffin - background vocals
- Mike Henderson - electric guitar
- Roy Huskey, Jr. - upright bass
- Suzie Katayama - cello
- Peter Kent - violin
- Mark O'Connor - fiddle, mandolin
- Herb Pedersen - background vocals
- Jimmy Joe Ruggiere - harmonica
- Myrna Smith - background vocals
- Marty Stuart - acoustic guitar, electric guitar, mandolin, sitar, duet vocals on "Double Trouble"
- Benmont Tench - organ, piano
- Lee Thornberg - trumpet
- Travis Tritt - acoustic guitar, electric guitar, lead vocals, background vocals
- Robby Turner - dobro, lap steel guitar, pedal steel guitar
- Lari White - duet vocals on "Helping Me Get Over You"
- Reggie Young - electric guitar

== Charts ==
=== Weekly charts ===
Chart (1996)	Peak position
Canadian Country Albums (RPM)	8
US Billboard 200	53
US Top Country Albums (Billboard)	7

=== Year-end charts ===
Chart (1996)	Position
US Top Country Albums (Billboard)	59

== Certifications ==
Region	Certification	Certified units/sales
United States (RIAA)	Platinum	1,000,000^{^}
^{^} Shipments figures based on certification alone.
