= That's How You Know (When You're in Love) =

Song recorded by American country music artist Lari White

Single by Lari White

from the album Wishes
- B-side: "If I'm Not Already Crazy"
- Released: January 21, 1995
- Genre: Country
- Length: 3:39
- Label: RCA Nashville
- Songwriters: Lari White, Chuck Cannon
- Producer: Garth Fundis

Lari White singles chronology
"Now I Know" (1994)	"That's How You Know (When You're in Love)" (1995)	"Ready, Willing and Able" (1996)

"That's How You Know (When You're in Love)" is a song recorded by American country music artist Lari White, who co-wrote the song with her husband Chuck Cannon. It was released in January 1995 as the third single from the album Wishes. The song reached number 10 on the Billboard Hot Country Singles & Tracks chart. It features a harmony vocal from Hal Ketchum.

== Critical reception ==
Billboard gave the single a positive review, saying that it was an "uplifting slice of country-pop".

== Chart performance ==
Chart (1995)	Peak position
Canada Country Singles (RPM)	18
US Hot Country Songs (Billboard)	10
