= Thrasher Shiver =

American country music duo

- Origin: Nashville, Tennessee, U.S.
- Genres: Country
- Years active: 1995–1997
- Labels: Asylum
- Past members: Kelly Shiver; Neil Thrasher

Thrasher Shiver /ˈθræʃər ˈʃaɪvər/ was an American country music duo composed of Neil Thrasher and Kelly Shiver, both of whom sang lead vocals and played acoustic guitar. In late 1996, the duo released a self-titled album for Asylum Records, and charted two singles on the Billboard Hot Country Singles & Tracks (now Hot Country Songs) charts. After the duo split up in 1997, Thrasher found work as a songwriter, writing for Rascal Flatts, Kenny Chesney, and others.

== Biography ==
Thrasher Shiver was founded in 1995, when singer-songwriters Neil Thrasher and Kelly Shiver were introduced to each other by Bob Doyle, owner of a management company who managed Garth Brooks. When the two began writing and singing songs together, they discovered that their voices blended well, so they decided to form a duo. Both members sang all the lead vocals together, as opposed to one singing lead and the other singing harmony.

In 1995, Thrasher Shiver was signed to Asylum Records. The duo's self-titled debut album was released on September 9, 1996. It produced two chart singles in "Goin' Goin' Gone" and "Be Honest", which respectively reached No. 65 and No. 49. on the country charts. One year after the album's release, Diamond Rio charted with the song "That's What I Get for Lovin' You", which Thrasher co-wrote. (He would later co-write the band's 2003 single "Wrinkles" as well.) Thrasher Shiver also was nominated for Vocal Duo of the Year at the Country Music Association Awards.

Although Thrasher Shiver did not record another album, both of its members have continued to write songs for other country music artists, with Thrasher being the more prolific of the two. Thrasher's credits include Number One hits for Rascal Flatts and Kenny Chesney, as well as several cuts by other artists.

== Discography ==
=== Albums ===
Title	Album details
Thrasher Shiver	Release date: September 9, 1996; Label: Asylum Records

=== Singles ===
Year	Single	Peak positions	Album
Year	Single	US Country	Album
1996	"Goin' Goin' Gone"	65	Thrasher Shiver
1996	"Closer"	—	Thrasher Shiver
1997	"Be Honest"	49	Thrasher Shiver
1997	"Between the Stones and Jones"	—	Thrasher Shiver
"—" denotes releases that did not chart

=== Music videos ===
Year	Video	Director
1996	"Goin' Goin' Gone"	
1997	"Be Honest"	Joel Franks
