= Daron Norwood =

American country music singer-songwriter (1965–2015)

- Born: Daron Jay Norwood; September 30, 1965; Lubbock, Texas, U.S.
- Origin: Tahoka, Texas, U.S.
- Died: July 22, 2015 (aged 49) Hereford, Texas, U.S.
- Genres: Country
- Occupations: Singer, songwriter, record producer
- Instruments: Vocals, piano, guitar, harmonica
- Years active: 1993–2015
- Labels: Giant, KIS, D10 Records

Daron Jay Norwood (September 30, 1965 – July 22, 2015) was an American country music singer. He released two albums for Giant Records and charted six times on Hot Country Songs.

== Musical career ==
Signed to Giant Records in 1993, he released two albums with the label, Daron Norwood (1994) and Ready, Willing and Able (1995), and charted six singles on the Billboard Hot Country Songs charts. Two singles off his debut album, "If It Wasn't For Her I Wouldn't Have You" and "Cowboys Don't Cry", both made the country Top 40. The title track of his second album was later a Top 20 hit in 1996 for Lari White.

In late 1994, Norwood co-wrote and sang "Little Boy Lost" on the BNA Records album Keith Whitley: A Tribute Album, a tribute to Keith Whitley which featured a mix of original songs, covers of Whitley's material, and new compositions. Norwood also sang "Working Elf Blues" on the 1995 multi-artist album Giant Country Christmas, Volume 1.

== Personal life and death ==
On November 5, 1995, Norwood decided to retire because of his addiction to alcohol. He told the Lubbock-Avalanche Journal that during that time period, he consumed 20 to 25 shots of Jack Daniel's a night.

Norwood also served as a motivational speaker. His program, called "Keep It Straight", was developed to warn children of the dangers of drug and alcohol abuse. Daron married Suella McCarty on July 5, 2009, which the couple had one son. Norwood also had three daughters from previous marriages.

Norwood was found dead in his apartment in Hereford, Texas, by his landlord on the afternoon of July 22, 2015. The Associated Press reported he was last seen the previous night by friends. Hereford police spokesperson, Capt. Kirsten Williams, stated on July 23 that Norwood's body showed no signs of trauma and that investigators did not suspect foul play. Williams further stated that cause of death was still pending.

== Discography ==
=== Albums ===
Title	Album details
Daron Norwood	Release date: February 1, 1994; Label: Giant Records
Ready, Willing and Able	Release date: March 28, 1995; Label: Giant Records
I Still Believe	Release date: August 3, 2012; Label: D10 records

=== Singles ===
Year	Single	Peak chart positions		Album
Year	Single	US Country	CAN Country	Album
1993	"If It Wasn't for Her I Wouldn't Have You"	26	12	Daron Norwood
1994	"Cowboys Don't Cry"	24	22	Daron Norwood
1994	"If I Ever Love Again"	48	52	Daron Norwood
1995	"Bad Dog, No Biscuit"	50	67	Ready, Willing and Able
1995	"My Girl Friday"	58	—	Ready, Willing and Able
2002	"In God We Trust"	—	—	—N/a
2011	"Take Me Back"	—	—	I Still Believe
2016	"The Journey"(posthumously)	—	—	—N/a
"—" denotes releases that did not chart

=== Other charted songs ===
Year	Single	Peak positions	Album
Year	Single	US Country	Album
1995	"The Working Elf Blues"	75	Giant Country Christmas Volume 1

=== Music videos ===
Year	Video	Director
1993	"If It Wasn't for Her, I Wouldn't Have You"	Marc Ball
1994	"Cowboys Don't Cry"	
1994	"If I Ever Love Again"	
1995	"Bad Dog, No Biscuit"	
1995	"My Girl Friday"	
2002	"In God We Trust"	
2010	"Take Me Back"	

== Sources ==
- "Students Say Former Singer's Behavior "Crazy" During Speech". www.newschannel10.com.
