= Chuck Cannon =

American singer-songwriter

- Birth name: Marion Cletus Cannon Jr.
- Born: Greenville, South Carolina, U.S.
- Genres: Country
- Occupation: Songwriter
- Instrument(s): Vocals, Guitar
- Years active: 1993–present
- Spouse: Lari White (m. 1994; died 2018)
- Website: chuckcannon.com

Marion Cletus Cannon Jr., known professionally as Chuck Cannon, is an American country music songwriter. His compositions include hit singles for Toby Keith and John Michael Montgomery. Cannon has also received awards for Broadcast Music Incorporated, as well as an Academy of Country Music award for Song of the Year. He is the widower of country music singer-songwriter Lari White.

== Early life ==
Marion Cletus Cannon Jr. was born and raised in South Carolina. His father was a Pentecostal preacher. He was inspired at an early age by local folk songs as well as black spiritual songs. He later performed at local venues, then moved to Nashville, Tennessee, in 1984 to attend Belmont University. By 1988, he was signed to a songwriting contract.

== Writing career ==
One of Cannon's first notable compositions was "I Love the Way You Love Me", a Number One hit for John Michael Montgomery in 1993, which Cannon co-wrote with Victoria Shaw. This song also won the Song of the Year award at the Academy of Country Music awards, which is awarded to songwriters.

Cannon then began working primarily for Toby Keith, including "Me Too", "Dream Walkin'", "We Were in Love", "Getcha Some", "If a Man Answers" and "When Love Fades" in the late 1990s, "How Do You Like Me Now?!" in 2000, and "American Soldier" in 2003–2004. "How Do You Like Me Now?!" was also the Number One country song of the year according to the Billboard Year-End charts. Both it and "I Love the Way You Love Me" earned Eight-Million-Air awards from Broadcast Music Incorporated for receiving eight million spins at radio. Cannon also self-released two albums: God Shaped Hole and Love and Money in 2006 and 2008, respectively.

Cannon's 2007 song "If I Was Jesus" was nominated for in the category Americana Song of the Year at the 7th Annual Independent Music Awards.

== Personal life ==
Cannon was married to Lari White until her death on January 23, 2018, for whom he has also written singles. They have two daughters, M'Kenzy and Kyra, and a son, Jaxon.

== Singles written by Cannon ==
- Sarah Buxton – "Space"
- Billy Dean – "This Is the Life"
- Wynonna Judd – "Heaven Help Me", "Flies on the Butter (You Can't Go Home Again)"
- Toby Keith – "Me Too", "Dream Walkin'", "We Were in Love", "Getcha Some", "If a Man Answers", "When Love Fades", "How Do You Like Me Now?!", "American Soldier"
- Lonestar – "Saturday Night"
- Shane Minor – "Slave to the Habit"
- John Michael Montgomery – "I Love the Way You Love Me"
- Lari White – "What a Woman Wants", "That's My Baby", "That's How You Know (When You're in Love)"
- John & Audrey Wiggins – "She's in the Bedroom Crying"
- Danny Gokey – "I Will Not Say Goodbye"
- Night Ranger – "Forever All Over Again"
