= Lee Ann Womack discography =

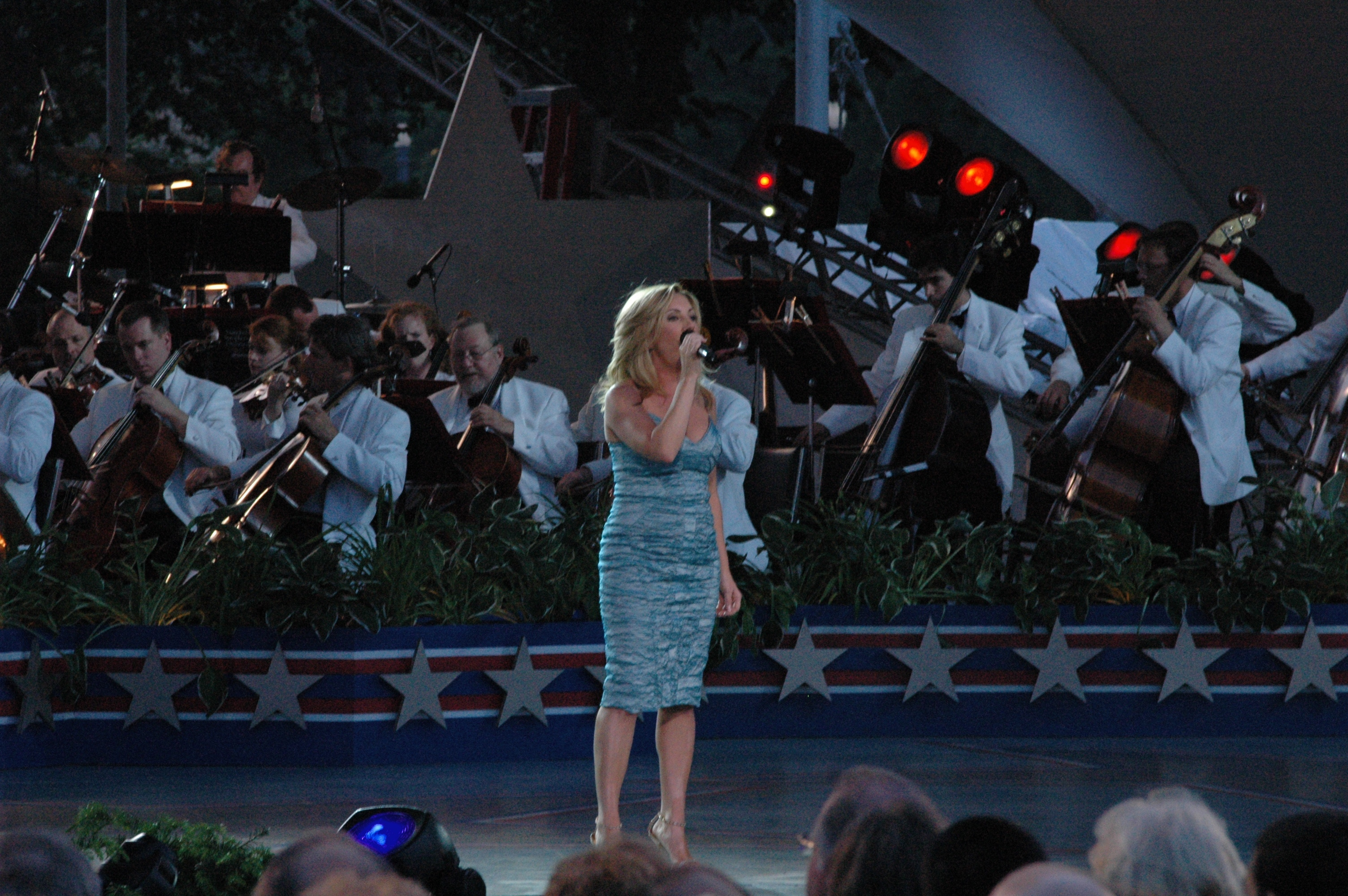
- Lee Ann Womack performing in Washington, D.C. at the National Memorial Day Concert, May 28, 2006.
- Studio albums: 9
- Extended plays: 1
- Compilation albums: 3
- Singles: 30
- Music videos: 20
- Other appearances: 43

American country music artist Lee Ann Womack has released nine studio albums, three compilation albums, one extended play, 30 singles, 20 music videos, and appeared on 43 albums. Womack's self-titled debut album was released in May 1997 on Decca Records. It peaked at number nine on the Billboard Top Country Albums chart and number 106 on the Billboard 200, certifying platinum from the Recording Industry Association of America. It featured the hit singles "Never Again, Again", "The Fool", and "You've Got to Talk to Me". Her gold-certifying second album Some Things I Know (1998) reached number 20 on the country albums chart, spawning the hits "A Little Past Little Rock" and "I'll Think of a Reason Later".

Womack's third studio album I Hope You Dance (2000) topped the Top Country Albums chart, reached number 16 on the Billboard 200, and certified triple platinum. The lead single brought her the biggest success of her career. It topped the Billboard Hot Country Songs chart, crossed over to number 14 on the Billboard Hot 100, and became a minor hit internationally. Her fourth studio record Something Worth Leaving Behind (2002) failed to match the commercial success of I Hope You Dance. A holiday album and greatest hits record appeared before the hit single, "I May Hate Myself in the Morning", and its accompanying There's More Where That Came From (2005). The album reached number 3 on the country chart and number 12 on the Billboard 200. Call Me Crazy (2008) debuted at number four on the Top Country Albums list and featured the top 20 hit "Last Call". Her eighth studio album The Way I'm Livin' (2014) reached peak positions on both the country albums and Independent Albums charts.

== Albums ==
=== Studio albums ===
List of albums, with selected chart positions and certifications, showing other relevant details
Title	Album details	Peak chart positions				Certifications
Title	Album details	US	US Coun.	US Ind.	CAN Coun.	Certifications
Lee Ann Womack	Released: May 13, 1997; Label: Decca; Formats: Cassette, CD	106	9	—	—	RIAA: Platinum
Some Things I Know	Released: September 22, 1998; Label: Decca; Formats: Cassette, CD	136	20	—	—	RIAA: Gold
I Hope You Dance	Released: May 23, 2000; Label: MCA Nashville; Formats: Cassette, CD	16	1	—	4	MC: Platinum; RIAA: 3× Platinum
Something Worth Leaving Behind	Released: August 20, 2002; Label: MCA Nashville; Formats: CD	16	2	—	—	
The Season for Romance	Released: October 29, 2002; Label: MCA Nashville; Formats: Cassette, CD	166	19	—	—	
There's More Where That Came From	Released: February 8, 2005; Label: MCA Nashville; Formats: Vinyl, CD, music download	12	3	—	—	RIAA: Gold
Call Me Crazy	Released: October 21, 2008; Label: MCA Nashville; Formats: Vinyl, CD, music download	23	4	—	—	
The Way I'm Livin'	Released: September 23, 2014; Label: Sugar Hill; Formats: Vinyl, CD, music download	99	18	22	—	
The Lonely, the Lonesome & the Gone	Released: October 27, 2017; Label: ATO; Formats: Vinyl, CD, music download	—	37	—	—	
"—" denotes a recording that did not chart or was not released in that territory.

=== Compilation albums ===
List of albums, with selected chart positions and certifications, showing other relevant details
Title	Album details	Peak chart positions		Certifications
Title	Album details	US	US Coun.	Certifications
Greatest Hits	Released: May 4, 2004; Label: MCA Nashville; Formats: Cassette, CD, music download	28	2	RIAA: Gold
Icon	Released: January 4, 2011; Label: MCA Nashville; Formats: CD	—	—	
Favorites (Note: Favorites was only available for a limited time at Cracker Barrel stores.)	Released: 2013; Label: Universal Special Markets; Formats: CD	—	—	
"—" denotes a recording that did not chart or was not released in that territory.

=== Extended plays ===
List of extended play albums, showing all relevant details
Title	Album details
Trouble in Mind	Released: April 18, 2015; Label: Sugar Hill; Formats: Vinyl

== Singles ==
=== As lead artist ===
List of singles, with selected chart positions and certifications, showing other relevant details
Title	Year	Peak chart positions									Certifications	Album
Title	Year	US	US Cou.	US AC	AUS	CAN Cou.	CAN AC	ND	NZ	UK	Certifications	Album
"Never Again, Again"	1997	— (Note: "Never Again, Again" did not enter the Hot 100, but peaked at number 24 on Bubbling Under Hot 100 Singles, which acts as a 25-song extension of the Hot 100.)	23	—	—	36	—	—	—	—		Lee Ann Womack
"The Fool"	1997	—	2	—	—	5	—	—	—	—		Lee Ann Womack
"You've Got to Talk to Me"	1997	—	2	—	—	2	—	—	—	—		Lee Ann Womack
"Buckaroo"	1998	—	27	—	—	34	—	—	—	—		Lee Ann Womack
"A Little Past Little Rock"	1998	43	2	—	—	3	—	—	—	—		Some Things I Know
"I'll Think of a Reason Later"	1998	38	2	—	—	1	—	—	—	—		Some Things I Know
"(Now You See Me) Now You Don't"	1999	72	12	—	—	11	—	—	—	—		Some Things I Know
"Don't Tell Me"	1999	—	56	—	—	63	—	—	—	—		Some Things I Know
"I Hope You Dance" (Note: "I Hope You Dance" credited guest vocals by Sons of the Desert only for its initial release to country radio. The alternate mix for the AC format did not credit them.)	2000	14	1	1	65	1	75	89	44	40	RIAA: 4× Platinum	I Hope You Dance
"Ashes by Now"	2000	45	4	—	—	—	—	—	—	—		I Hope You Dance
"Why They Call It Falling"	2001	78	13	—	—	—	—	—	—	—		I Hope You Dance
"Does My Ring Burn Your Finger"	2001	—	23	—	—	—	—	—	—	—		I Hope You Dance
"Something Worth Leaving Behind"	2002	— (Note: "Something Worth Leaving Behind" did not enter the Hot 100, but peaked at number 14 on Bubbling Under Hot 100 Singles, which acts as a 25-song extension of the Hot 100.)	20	—	—	—	—	—	—	—		Something Worth Leaving; Behind
"Forever Everyday"	2002	—	37	—	—	—	—	—	—	—		Something Worth Leaving; Behind
"The Wrong Girl"	2004	—	24	—	—	—	—	—	—	—		Greatest Hits
"I May Hate Myself in the Morning"	2004	66	10	—	—	—	—	—	—	—		There's More Where That; Came From
"He Oughta Know That by Now"	2005	— (Note: "He Oughta Know That by Now" did not enter the Hot 100, but peaked at number 16 on Bubbling Under Hot 100 Singles, which acts as a 25-song extension of the Hot 100.)	22	—	—	—	—	—	—	—		There's More Where That; Came From
"Twenty Years and Two Husbands Ago"	2005	—	32	—	—	—	—	—	—	—		There's More Where That; Came From
"Finding My Way Back Home"	2006	—	37	—	—	—	—	—	—	—		—N/a
"Last Call"	2008	77	14	—	—	43	—	—	—	—	RIAA: Gold	Call Me Crazy
"Solitary Thinkin'"	2009	—	39	—	—	—	—	—	—	—		Call Me Crazy
"There Is a God"	2009	—	32	—	—	—	—	—	—	—		—N/a
"The Way I'm Livin'"	2014	—	—	—	—	—	—	—	—	—		The Way I'm Livin'
"Send It On Down"	2015	—	—	—	—	—	—	—	—	—		The Way I'm Livin'
"Chances Are"	2015	—	—	—	—	—	—	—	—	—		The Way I'm Livin'
"All the Trouble"	2017	—	—	—	—	—	—	—	—	—		The Lonely, the Lonesome & the Gone
"Sunday"	2017	—	—	—	—	—	—	—	—	—		The Lonely, the Lonesome & the Gone
"Hollywood"	2017	—	—	—	—	—	—	—	—	—		The Lonely, the Lonesome & the Gone
"—" denotes a recording that did not chart or was not released in that territory.

=== As a featured artist ===
List of singles, with selected chart positions, showing other relevant details
Title	Year	Peak chart positions		Album
Title	Year	US	US Coun.	Album
"Mendocino County Line" (Willie Nelson with Lee Ann Womack)	2002	— (Note: "Mendocino County Line" did not enter the Hot 100, but peaked at number 13 on Bubbling Under Hot 100 Singles, which acts as a 25-song extension of the Hot 100.)	22	The Great Divide
"Flatland Hillbillies" (Rodney Crowell featuring Randy Rogers and Lee Ann Womack)	2019	—	—	Texas
"—" denotes a recording that did not chart.

== Music videos ==
=== As lead artist ===
List of music videos, showing year released and directors
Title	Year	Director(s)	Ref.
"Never Again, Again"	1997	Gerry Wenner	
"The Fool"	1997	Gerry Wenner	
"Buckaroo"	1997	Gerry Wenner	
"A Little Past Little Rock"	1998	Larry Boothby; Thom Oliphant	
"I Hope You Dance"	2000	Gerry Wenner	
"Ashes by Now"	2000	Gregg Horne	
"Something Worth Leaving Behind"	2002	Thomas Kloss	
"Silent Night"	2002	Ryan Polito	
"I May Hate Myself in the Morning"	2004	Trey Fanjoy	
"Twenty Years and Two Husbands Ago"	2005	Paul Boyd	
"Finding My Way Back Home"	2006	Paul Boyd	
"Last Call"	2008	Trey Fanjoy	
"Solitary Thinkin'"	2009	Trey Fanjoy; Roger Pistole	
"The Way I'm Livin'"	2014	Roger Pistole	
"Send It on Down"	2015	Bill Filipiak	
"Chances Are"	2016	Roger Pistole	
"All the Trouble"	2018	Claire Marie Vogel	
"Hollywood"	2019	Chris Ullens	

=== As guest artist ===
List of music videos, showing year released and directors
Title	Year	Director(s)	Ref.
"Mendocino County Line" (with Willie Nelson)	2002	Mark Seliger; Chris Soos	
"Sick and Tired" (with Cross Canadian Ragweed)	2004	Eric Welch	

== Other appearances ==
List of non-single guest appearances, with other performing artists, showing year released and album name
Title	Year	Other artist(s)	Album	Ref.
"Kindly Keep It Country"	1998	Vince Gill	The Key	
"Hear to Heart Talk"	1999	Asleep at the Wheel	Ride with Bob	
"Every Fire"	1999	Jason Sellers	A Matter of Time	
"Never, Ever, and Forever"	2000	Mark Wills	Tom Sawyer (soundtrack)	
"One Dream"	2000	—N/a	Tom Sawyer (soundtrack)	
"Light at the End of the Tunnel" (reprise)	2000	Rhett Akins	Tom Sawyer (soundtrack)	
"Mendocino County Line" (live)	2002	Willie Nelson	Willie Nelson & Friends – Stars & Guitars	
"Two Hearts"	2003	Vince Gill	Next Big Thing	
"Dance Your Cares Away (The Feng Shui Song)"	2003	Lillian Too	Feng Shui	
"She's Got You"	2003	—N/a	Remembering Patsy Cline	
"Sick and Tired"	2004	Cross Canadian Ragweed	Soul Gravy	
"On a Woman's Heart"	2004	—N/a	America Will Always Stand	
"I Can't Drive You from My Mind"	2004	Kevin Montgomery	2:30 am	
"I'll Never Be Free"	2004	Willie Nelson	Outlaws and Angels	
"Good News, Bad News"	2005	George Strait	Somewhere Down in Texas	
"Where Have All the Flowers Gone?" (also featuring Norah Jones)	2005	Dolly Parton	Those Were the Days	
"If I Can Make Mississippi"	2006	Vince Gill	These Days	
"The Weight"	2007	—N/a	Endless Highway: The Music of The Band	
"Today, I Started Loving You Again"	2007	Gene Watson	In a Perfect World	
"If Only I Could Fly"	2007	Joe Nichols	Real Things	
"Till the End"	2010	Alan Jackson	Freight Train	
"Addicted"	2010	Randy Houser	They Call Me Cadillac	
"Liars Lie"	2010	—N/a	Country Strong	
"I'm a Honky Tonk Girl"	2010	—N/a	Coal Miner's Daughter: A Tribute to Loretta Lynn	
"Ring of Fire"	2010	Alan Jackson	34 Number Ones	
"Blessed"	2010	Martina McBride	The Country Music Hall of Fame and Museum Presents; Sunday In the Country	
"Get Up in Jesus' Name"	2010	Mark Wills	The Country Music Hall of Fame and Museum Presents; Sunday In the Country	
"I Was a Burden"	2011	The Blind Boys of Alabama	Take the High Road	
"Lipstick Everywhere"	2011	Vince Gill	Guitar Slinger	
"Songs for Sale"	2011	David Nail	The Sound of a Million Dreams	
"Momma's on a Roll"	2012	Rodney Crowell	Kin: Songs by Mary Karr and Rodney Crowell	
"This Ain't My First Rodeo"	2012	Jamey Johnson	Living for a Song: A Tribute to Hank Cochran	
"Let 'Em In"	2013	—N/a	Let Us in Americana: The Music of Paul McCartney	
"The Legend of the Rebel Soldier"	2013	—N/a	Divided and United: Songs of the Civil War	
"Galveston"	2014	David Nail	I'm a Fire	
"Doin' Time in Bakersfield"	2014	Jim Lauderdale	I'm a Song	
"A Day with No Tomorrow"	2014	Jim Lauderdale	I'm a Song	
"Waiting Tables" (also featuring Jamey Johnson)	2015	Don Henley	Cass County	
"Loving Me Back"	2016	Brothers Osborne	Pawn Shop	
"Storms Never Last"	2016	John Prine	For Better, or Worse	
"Fifteen Years Ago"	2016	John Prine	For Better, or Worse	
"Born to Run"	2016	—N/a	The Life & Songs Of Emmylou Harris: An All-Star Concert Celebration (Live)	
"Honky Cat"	2018	—N/a	Restoration: Reimagining the Songs of Elton John and Bernie Taupin	
"This Isn't Gonna End Well"	2019	John Paul White	The Hurting Kind	
"Dusty Old Dust"	2021	—N/a	Home in This World: Woody Guthrie’s Dustbowl Ballads	
