= Greatest Hits (Lee Ann Womack album) =

Greatest hits album by Lee Ann Womack
- Released: May 4, 2004
- Studio: Ocean Way Nashville, Essential Sound, Emerald Studios and Sound Kitchen (Nashville, Tennessee)
- Genre: Country
- Length: 51:59
- Label: MCA Nashville
- Producer: Lee Ann Womack; Mark Wright; Matt Serletic; Frank Liddell; Byron Gallimore

Lee Ann Womack chronology
The Season for Romance (2002)	Greatest Hits (2004)	There's More Where That Came From (2005)

Singles from Greatest Hits
- 1. "The Wrong Girl" Released: February 17, 2004

Greatest Hits is the first compilation album by American country music artist Lee Ann Womack, released on May 4, 2004 by MCA Nashville. It was Womack's first release issued on both the DualDisc and Super Audio CD formats, both of which were issued the following year. The compilation includes eleven of Womack's previous songs, including her sole number one on the Billboard Hot Country Songs chart "I Hope You Dance" with Sons of the Desert. One of those, "Does My Ring Burn Your Finger", was re-worked for this compilation. Also included is her duet with Willie Nelson, "Mendocino County Line", which was included on Nelson's 50th studio album The Great Divide (2002), but had only been included on the UK edition of Womack's fourth studio album Something Worth Leaving Behind (2002).

Two new songs were specifically recorded for the compilation: "The Wrong Girl" and "Time for Me to Go". The former was released as the compilation's sole single on February 17, 2004, where it peaked at number 24 on the US Hot Country Singles & Tracks chart. The compilation was a commercial success, debuting at number two on the Top Country Albums chart. It has been certified Gold by the RIAA for sales of 500,000 copies.

== Content ==
Fourteen songs in total are included on Greatest Hits. It opens up with Womack's debut single "Never Again, Again" from her 1997 eponymous debut studio album. "You've Got to Talk to Me" and "The Fool" are also included; excluded is the number-27 peaking single "Buckaroo". "A Little Past Little Rock" is the first song included from her second studio album Some Things I Know (1998). The two other singles included from that album are "(Now You See Me) Now You Don't" and "I'll Think of a Reason Later"; "Don't Tell Me" was not included due to its poor performance. All singles from Womack's third studio album I Hope You Dance (2000) are included, along with the number-one hit title track with Sons of the Desert. A difference however is on "Does My Ring Burn Your Finger", which was remixed for this compilation. The only song included from her fourth studio album Something Worth Leaving Behind (2002) is the number-20 hit title cut. Also included is Womack's Grammy-winning duet with Willie Nelson, "Mendocino County Line", which was released from Nelson's 50th album The Great Divide (2002), but had only been included on the UK special edition of Something Worth Leaving Behind.

Two new songs were recorded for this compilation. The first is "The Wrong Girl", co-written by then-unknown songwriter Liz Rose, who would be well-known for co-writing the bulk of Taylor Swift's early country material. In a review by Billboard, they lyrically described it as about a guy "who seems to have it all" but that Womack "is not so sure." The other newly written track is "Time for Me to Go", which Womack co-wrote with Tommy Lee Jones.

== Singles ==
"The Wrong Girl" was the only single from the compilation, released on February 17, 2004. It peaked at number 24 on the US Billboard Hot Country Songs chart, becoming Womack's 15th top-40 hit.

== Critical reception ==
Professional ratings
Review scores
Source	Rating
Allmusic	link

Greatest Hits received positive reception from music critics. AllMusic's Stephen Thomas Erlewine gave a positive review for the compilation. He noted all the big hits of Womack's career were included and although some songs were cut ("Buckaroo", "Don't Tell Me", and "Forever Everyday"), it nevertheless offers a "good summary and introduction to the first part of Womack's career."

== Commercial performance ==
Greatest Hits debuted at number two on the Billboard Top Country Albums chart, selling 37,058 copies in its first week. Womack was blocked from the number one spot by Kenny Chesney, whose album When the Sun Goes Down (2004) was spending its 14th consecutive week at number one. In that same week, it debuted at number 28 on the Billboard 200. In its second week on both charts, it fell to numbers seven and 53. The compilation would spend 71 weeks on the country albums chart and eight weeks on the all-genre chart.

== Track listing ==
All songs produced by Mark Wright except where noted.

No.	Title	Writer(s)	Original album	Length
1.	"Never Again, Again"	Monty Holmes; Barbie Isham	Lee Ann Womack (1997)	3:45
2.	"You've Got to Talk to Me"	Jamie O'Hara	Lee Ann Womack (1997)	3:35
3.	"The Fool"	Charlie Stefl; Gene Ellsworth; Marla Cannon-Goodman	Lee Ann Womack (1997)	3:34
4.	"A Little Past Little Rock"	Tony Lane; Jess Brown; Brett Jones	Some Things I Know (1998)	4:17
5.	"(Now You See Me) Now You Don't"	Lane; Brown; David Lee	Some Things I Know (1998)	2:40
6.	"I'll Think of a Reason Later"	Tim Nichols; Tony Martin	Some Things I Know (1998)	3:39
7.	"I Hope You Dance" (featuring Sons of the Desert)	Mark D. Sanders; Tia Sillers	I Hope You Dance (2000)	4:56
8.	"Ashes by Now"	Rodney Crowell	I Hope You Dance (2000)	4:12
9.	"Why They Call It Falling"	Don Schlitz; Roxie Dean	I Hope You Dance (2000)	3:36
10.	"Something Worth Leaving Behind" (produced by Mark Wright and Lee Ann Womack)	Brett Beavers; Tom Douglas	Something Worth Leaving Behind (2002)	3:50
11.	"Mendocino County Line" (duet with Willie Nelson, produced by Matt Serletic)	Bernie Taupin; Matt Serletic	The Great Divide (2002)	4:34
12.	"Does My Ring Burn Your Finger" (Remix, produced by Frank Liddell)	Buddy Miller; Julie Miller	Original version found on I Hope You Dance; Remix previously unreleased	3:29
13.	"The Wrong Girl" (produced by Byron Gallimore)	Liz Rose; Pat McLaughlin	Previously unreleased	3:00
14.	"Time for Me to Go" (produced by Byron Gallimore)	Lee Ann Womack; Tommy Lee James	Previously unreleased	2:52
Total length:				51:59

== Personnel (Tracks 13 & 14) ==
Taken from the Greatest Hits booklet.

- Lee Ann Womack – vocals
- Steve Nathan – keyboards (13)
- Jimmy Nichols – keyboards (14)
- B. James Lowry – acoustic guitar (13)
- Brent Mason – electric guitar (13)
- Pat Buchanan – electric guitar (14)
- Randy Scruggs – acoustic guitar (14)
- Paul Franklin – steel guitar (13)
- Rusty Danmyer – steel guitar (14)
- Glenn Worf – bass
- Lonnie Wilson – drums (13)
- Chad Cromwell – drums (14)
- Larry Franklin – fiddle (13)
- Aubrey Haynie – fiddle (14)
- Buddy Miller – backing vocals (14)

=== Production ===
- Mark Wright – producer (1–10)
- Lee Ann Womack – producer (10)
- Matt Serletic – producer (11)
- Frank Liddell – producer (12)
- Byron Gallimore – producer (13, 14)
- Hank Williams – mastering at MasterMix (Nashville, Tennessee)
- Jim Kemp – art direction
- Craig Allen – design
- James Minchin III – photography (front and back covers, inlays, backgrounds on pages 5 & 9)
- Russ Harrington – photography (page 1)
- Alan Mayor – photography (page 6)
- John Russell – photography (page 6)
- Jacky Sallow – photography (page 6)
- Ron Wolfson – photography (page 6)
- Beth Gwinn – photography (pages 7 & 10)
- Timothy Priano – artist
- Keith Carpenter – hair
- Mally Roncal – make-up
- Seble Maaza – styling
- Erv Woolsey – management
- Scott Kernahan – management

Technical credits (Tracks 13 & 14)

- Julian King – recording
- Greg Droman – mixing (13)
- Gary Paczosa – mixing (14)
- David Bryant – recording assistant
- Julie Brakey – recording assistant (13)
- Greg Lawrence – mix assistant (14)
- Erik Lutkins – additional recording
- Jason Gantt – additional recording assistant

== Charts ==
=== Weekly charts ===
Chart (2004)	Peak position
US Billboard 200	28
US Top Country Albums (Billboard)	2

=== Year-end charts ===
Chart (2004)	Position
US Top Country Albums (Billboard)	61
Chart (2005)	Position
US Top Country Albums (Billboard)	73

== Certifications ==
Region	Certification	Certified units/sales
United States (RIAA)	Gold	500,000^{^}
^{^} Shipments figures based on certification alone.
