= One Dream (disambiguation) =

One Dream is a 2012 Korean-language song by BoA, No.34 in Korea

One Dream may also refer to:

- One Dream (Ernie Smith song), 1971 No.1 hit in Jamaica
- "One Dream", Sarah McLachlan song written for the Vancouver Winter Olympics on Laws of Illusion
- "One Dream", song by Lee Ann Womack from Lee Ann Womack discography for the Tom Sawyer soundtrack
- "One Dream", song by Bruce Turgon song for the film Highlander II: The Quickening soundtrack
- "One Dream", song by Slim Whitman 1966
