= Last Stand in Open Country =

Last Stand in Open Country may refer to:

- Last Stand in Open Country, a 1996 album Farm Dogs with Bernie Taupin
- "Last Stand in Open Country", a song by Willie Nelson from the 2002 album The Great Divide
