= Something Worth Leaving Behind =

Studio album by Lee Ann Womack
- Released: August 20, 2002
- Recorded: 2001
- Studio: Sound Kitchen (Franklin, Tennessee); House of Gain, Javelina Studios, Starstruck Studios, Tragedy/Tragedy Studio, Quad Studios, New Reflections Studio and Ocean Way Nashville (Nashville, Tennessee); Conway Recording Studios and Capitol Studios (Hollywood, California); Westlake Studios and Record Plant (Los Angeles, California); Hook Studios (North Hollywood, California)
- Genre: Country pop
- Length: 57:36
- Label: MCA Nashville
- Producer: Lee Ann Womack; Mark Wright; Frank Liddell; Mike McCarthy; Matt Serletic

Lee Ann Womack chronology
I Hope You Dance (2000)	Something Worth Leaving Behind (2002)	The Season for Romance (2002)

Singles from Something Worth Leaving Behind
- 1. "Something Worth Leaving Behind" Released: May 20, 2002; 2. "Forever Everyday" Released: October 14, 2002

Something Worth Leaving Behind is the fourth studio album by American country music artist Lee Ann Womack. It was released on August 20, 2002, by MCA Nashville; the UK version was co-released on Island Records.

After the huge crossover success of her 2000 song "I Hope You Dance", which became her only number one single on the US Billboard Hot Country Singles & Tracks chart, Womack decided to pivot to a more crossover-friendly country sound, which was unlike her previous albums that were more in line with traditional country and of which garnered the singer critical acclaim and comparisons to legends like Loretta Lynn. Recording took place in studios around Nashville and Hollywood. It is Womack's first album to not have any songs co-written or written by her. Womack worked with producers Mark Wright, Frank Liddell, Mike McCarthy, and Matt Serletic.

Upon its release, Something Worth Leaving Behind received primarily mixed to negative reviews from music critics, with the attempt of a crossover album being negatively noted and the music being criticized for not being up to par with her previous albums. Although it debuted at number two on the Top Country Albums chart and number 16 on the Billboard 200, it quickly fell off both charts due to the poor success of both of its singles. As of March 7, 2005, the album has sold 300,000 copies in the United States, a commercial failure compared to the three-million Womack's previous album I Hope You Dance (2000) sold.

The title cut "Something Worth Leaving Behind" was released as the lead single on May 20, 2002. Despite a promising debut at number 54, it only peaked at number 20 on the Billboard Hot Country Songs chart, marking her lowest peaking lead single since her debut single "Never Again, Again" (1997) reached number 23. The second and final single, "Forever Everyday", peaked at number 37, becoming her lowest-charting single since "Don't Tell Me" (1999) reached number 56. With that, Something Worth Leaving Behind became Womack's first album to not have any top ten hits on the country charts. When speaking of the album in a retrospective interview in 2005, Womack said verbatim that the album was a misstep in terms of a career move and that she regretted it.

== Background ==
Womack told The Early Show "It's very much in line with my last three. This is my fourth project. You know, I have the real traditional country songs on there, and then I have some things that are a little more contemporary and up-tempo. And—and, but I—you know, I try to find songs from the best songwriters that I can." Womack told Billboard, "Every album seems critical when you are making it. I have a lot of confidence in my team. You can't predict commercially what an album is going to do. I just have to make the best music I can and move on. I've never, ever felt like in my career that everything hinges on the next single. I don't worry about it."

In 2005, Womack told The Dallas Morning News, "I didn't have that much fun making Something Worth Leaving Behind. Now that I look back on it, because of the success that I had prior, I was so worried that I was gonna not measure up to that, that I over-thought everything on that record. I tried...to please everybody with that record...myself, radio, the listeners, everybody who loved 'Never Again, Again' and everybody who loved 'I Hope You Dance.' And it just didn't work. It backfired."

== Album cover ==
Matthew Rolston, who is well-known for his shots of artists like Cyndi Lauper and Jennifer Lopez, photographed the album cover, which notably is more sexual than Womack's previous album covers and garnered a negative response from her country fan-base. In a Tower Records location, at least one parent complained about Womack's cleavage being "unsuitable for children to watch." Some publications called the album cover a "very un-country" look. The photoshoot costed around $100,000 according to one source.

== Singles ==
The title track was serviced to country radio on May 20, 2002, as the lead single from the album. According to Womack, her bass player and one of the song's writers, Brett Beavers, said that the song was originally offered for an unspecified artist but that Beavers would not let them record it until Womack heard it; once she heard it, she decided to record the song herself. She also specifically chose producer Matt Serletic, who is well-known for his work with Matchbox Twenty, to produce an alternative version of "Something Worth Leaving Behind" for "mass-appeal" like her hit song "I Hope You Dance". Lyrically, the song speaks of "leaving behind one's mark on the world." The song debuted at number 54 on the Billboard Hot Country Songs chart the week of June 1, 2002. It peaked at number 20 on that chart, becoming her first lead single since her debut single "Never Again, Again" to miss the top ten. Despite a "pop" remix being made, the song never crossed over to either pop or adult contemporary radio.

"Forever Everyday" was the second and final single from the album, released on October 14, 2002. It received a positive review from Deborah Evans Price of Billboard magazine, calling it a "beautiful ballad with a poignant message about life, innocence, and what the passing of time does to our hearts and minds." It debuted on the Hot Country Songs chart the week of October 26, 2002, at number 59. It would peak at number 37, becoming Womack's lowest-charting song since 1999's "Don't Tell Me", which only peaked at number 56. Following this, no other singles were released.

== Critical reception ==
Professional ratings
Review scores
Source	Rating
Allmusic	4/5 stars
No Depression	(negative)
Robert Christgau	(choice cut)

Something Worth Leaving Behind received mixed reviews from music critics. Jim Collins of The Vindicator gave a negative review saying that "too many of its tracks sound like tired refugees from 70's pop radio" and that "Womack frequently comes across as subdued and emotionally distant." Brian Mansfiled of USA Today named it as the tenth worst album of 2002, writing "Womack's ill-advised crossover ploy and a makeover that made her look like Britney Spears' mother made one of Nashville's most respected singers the butt of jokes." People Magazine's Ralph Novak gave the album a mixed review, saying, "Womack's voice, which can trickle off and become a wan instrument, gains noticeably in vigor when she approaches more energetic material." Tim Perry of The Independent wrote, "Following such an album is a hard task, but someone of her newfound stature can avail herself of the best songwriters. This is solid, radio-friendly stuff. Michael Paoletta of Billboard wrote, "Womack is brilliant vocalist who is at a career crossroads; here's hoping she leans toward substance over style." Thom Jurek of AllMusic, in a retrospective review, highly praised the album, saying it "cemented Womack's place in the country music pantheon by pushing her own boundaries as an artist further than ever before. David Cantwell of No Depression, in an opposite case, gave a negative review. He ended his review by saying, "The results, no matter which side of the pop-twang divide you're on, will likely be very disappointing." Robert Christgau noted the songs "He'll Be Back" and "I Need You" as highlights.

== Commercial performance ==
Something Worth Leaving Behind was released before albums by Womack's contemporaries like Shania Twain and Faith Hill. It debuted at number two on the Billboard Top Country Albums chart, blocked by Toby Keith's Unleashed (2002), which was spending a fifth week at number one. In that same week of September 7, 2002, it debuted at number 16 on the all-genre Billboard 200, tying I Hope You Dance as her highest charting album there at the time. It sold 48,305 copies in its first week. In its second week, the album fell to numbers four and 29 on the two charts. In total, Something Worth Leaving Behind spent 30 weeks on the Top Country Albums chart and 11 weeks on the Billboard 200. The album's failure was attributed to the fact that both traditional country fans and Womack's fan-base disliked the new sound along with MCA Nashville being folded into Universal Music Group Nashville and thus the album may have gotten "lost" in the mix. As of March 7, 2005, the album has sold 300,000 copies in the United States according to Nielsen SoundScan.

== Track listing ==
Standard edition
No.	Title	Writer(s)	Producer(s)	Length
1.	"Something Worth Leaving Behind"	Brett Beavers; Tom Douglas	Lee Ann Womack; Mark Wright	3:50
2.	"I Saw Your Light"	Gretchen Peters	Womack; Wright	6:02
3.	"When You Gonna Run to Me"	Monty Powell; Jimmie Lee Sloas; Anna Wilson	Womack; Wright	3:58
4.	"Talk to Me"	David Grissom; Kevin Hunter	Womack; Frank Liddell; Mike McCarthy	5:47
5.	"Forever Everyday"	Devon O'Day; Kim Patton-Johnston	Womack; Wright	3:51
6.	"Orphan Train"	Julie Miller	Womack; Wright	4:05
7.	"I Need You"	Miller	Womack; Liddell; McCarthy	4:55
8.	"You Should've Lied"	Angelo Petraglia; Matraca Berg	Womack; Wright	4:44
9.	"He'll Be Back"	Hank Cochran; Red Lane; Dale Dodson	Womack; Wright	2:48
10.	"Surrender"	Sally Barris; Karyn Rochelle	Womack; Liddell; McCarthy	4:24
11.	"Blame It on Me"	Bruce Robison	Womack; Liddell; McCarthy	4:06
12.	"Closing This Memory Down"	Dave Loggins; John Bettis	Womack; Wright	4:08
13.	"Something Worth Leaving Behind" (Serletic Version/International Version)	Beavers; Douglas	Matt Serletic	4:32
Total length:				57:36

UK special edition
No.	Title	Writer(s)	Producer(s)	Length
14.	"Mendocino County Line" (Willie Nelson with Lee Ann Womack)	Matt Serletic; Bernie Taupin	Serletic	4:32
Total length:				1:02:08

== Personnel ==
Credits adapted from album liner notes.

Musicians

- Lee Ann Womack – vocals
- Steve Nathan – acoustic piano (1–3, 5, 6, 8, 9, 12), synthesizers (1–3, 5, 6, 8, 9, 12), Hammond B3 organ (1–3, 5, 6, 8, 9, 12)
- Chuck Leavell – acoustic piano (1–3, 5, 6, 8, 9, 12)
- Jeffrey Roach – acoustic piano (4, 7, 10, 11), keyboards (4, 7, 10, 11)
- Jay Joyce – programming (4, 7, 10, 11), acoustic guitar (4, 7, 10, 11), electric guitar (4, 7, 10, 11), additional arrangements (4, 7, 10, 11)
- Jim Cox – keyboards (13)
- Jon Gilutin – keyboards (13)
- Kenny Greenberg – electric guitar (1–12), acoustic guitar (4, 7, 10, 11), additional arrangements (4, 7, 10, 11)
- B. James Lowry – acoustic guitar (1–3, 5, 6, 8, 9, 12)
- Brent Mason – electric guitar (1–3, 5, 6, 8, 9, 12), gut-string guitar (1–3, 5, 6, 8, 9, 12)
- Brent Rowan – electric guitar (1–3, 5, 6, 8, 9, 12), tiple (1–3, 5, 6, 8, 9, 12)
- Randy Scruggs – acoustic guitar (1–3, 5, 6, 8, 9, 12)
- David Grissom – acoustic guitar (4, 7, 10, 11), electric guitar (4, 7, 10, 11)
- Colin Linden – acoustic guitar (4, 7, 10, 11)
- Jerry McPherson – electric guitar (4, 7, 10, 11)
- Heitor Pereira – guitars (13)
- Tim Pierce – guitars (13)
- Paul Franklin – steel guitar (1–12)
- Greg Leisz – steel guitar (13)
- Bryan Sutton – banjo (1–3, 5, 6, 8, 9, 12), mandolin (1–3, 5, 6, 8, 9, 12)
- Michael Rhodes – bass (1–3, 5, 6, 8, 9, 12)
- Spencer Campbell – bass (4, 7, 10, 11)
- Leland Sklar – bass (13)
- Shannon Forrest – drums (1–3, 5, 6, 8, 9, 12)
- Chris McHugh – drums (4, 7, 10, 11)
- Kenny Aronoff – drums (13)
- Eric Darken – percussion (1–3, 5, 6, 8, 9, 12)
- Brad Dutz – percussion (13)
- Jeff Coffin – horns (8)
- Jim Horn – horns (8)
- Denis Solee – horns (8)
- Aubrey Haynie – fiddle (1–3, 5, 6, 8, 9, 12)
- Gabe Witcher – fiddle (13)
- Matt Serletic – music and orchestra arrangements (13)
- Pete Anthony – orchestra conductor (13)
- Shari Sutcliffe – orchestra contractor (13)

The Nashville String Machine (Tracks 1, 3, 4, 6 & 8–12)

- David Campbell – string arrangements (1, 3, 8)
- John Mark Painter – string arrangements (4, 10, 11)
- Kristin Wilkinson – string arrangements (6)
- Bergen White – string arrangements (9, 12)
- David Angell, Monisa Angell, Janet Askey, John Catchings, David Davidson, Conni Ellisor, Carl Gorodetzky, Jim Grosjean, Paul David Hancock, Connie Heard, Mary Alice Hoepfinger, Carolyn Huebl, Anthony LaMarchina, Lee Larrison, Bob Mason, Cate Myer, Carole Neuen-Rabinowitz, Lynn Peithman, Pamela Sixfin, Elisabeth Small, Christopher Stenstrom, Christian Teal, Alan Umstead, Catherine Umstead, Gary Vanosdale, Mary Kathryn Vanosdale, Felix Wang, Kristin Wilkinson, Karen Winklemann and Andrea Zonn Gardner – string players

Background vocalists

- Bob Bailey – backing vocals (1–3, 5, 6, 8, 9, 12)
- Lisa Cochran – backing vocals (1–3, 5, 6, 8, 9, 12)
- Kim Fleming – backing vocals (1–12)
- Vicki Hampton – backing vocals (1–12)
- Marabeth Jordan – backing vocals (1–3, 5, 6, 8, 9, 12)
- Kim Keyes – backing vocals (1–3, 5, 6, 8, 9, 12)
- Gene Miller – backing vocals (1–3, 5, 6, 8, 9, 12)
- Chris Rodriguez – backing vocals (1–3, 5, 6, 8, 9, 12)
- Keith Sewell – backing vocals (1–3, 5, 6, 8, 9, 12)
- Bergen White – backing vocals (1–3, 5, 6, 8, 9, 12)
- Dan Colehour – backing vocals (4, 7, 10, 11)
- Bobby Huff – backing vocals (4, 7, 10, 11)
- Marcus Hummon – backing vocals (4, 7, 10, 11)
- Fleming McWilliams – backing vocals (4, 7, 10, 11)
- Buddy Miller – backing vocals (4, 7, 10, 11)
- Julie Miller – backing vocals (4, 7, 10, 11)
- Bruce Robison – backing vocals (4, 7, 10, 11)
- Maxi Anderson – backing vocals (13)
- Tommy Funderburk – backing vocals (13)
- Maxine Waters Willard – backing vocals (13)
- Oren Waters – backing vocals (13)

== Production ==
- Lee Ann Womack – producer (1–12)
- Mark Wright – producer (1–3, 5, 6, 8, 9, 12)
- Frank Liddell – producer (4, 7, 10, 11)
- Mike McCarthy – producer (4, 7, 10, 11)
- Matt Serletic – producer (13)
- Carie Higdon – project coordinator (1–3, 5, 6, 8, 9, 12)
- Jessie Noble – project coordinator (1–3, 5, 6, 8, 9, 12)
- Courtney Clay – project coordinator (4, 7, 10, 11)
- Buddy Jackson – art direction
- Karinne Caulkins – art direction, design
- Matthew Rolston – photography
- Kevin Mancuso – hair
- Mally Roncal – make-up
- Brooke Dulien – stylist
- Erv Woolsey – management
- Scott Kernahan – management

Technical credits

- Hank Williams – mastering (1–12) at MasterMix (Nashville, Tennessee)
- Stephen Marcussen – mastering (13) at Marcussen Mastering (Hollywood, California)
- Ronnie Thomas – editing at MasterMix
- James Lightman – digital editing (4, 7, 10, 11)
- Stewart Whitmore – digital editing (13)
- Greg Droman – recording (1–3, 5, 6, 8, 9, 12), mixing (1–3, 5, 6, 8, 9, 12)
- Mike McCarthy – recording (4, 7, 10, 11), mixing (4, 7, 10, 11)
- Noel Golden – recording (13), string recording (13)
- David Thoener – mixing (13)
- Todd Gunnerson – additional engineer (1–3, 5, 6, 8, 9, 12)
- Chad Brown – assistant engineer (4, 7, 10, 11)
- David Bryant – assistant engineer (4, 7, 10, 11)
- Brian Graben – assistant engineer (4, 7, 10, 11)
- Tony High – assistant engineer (4, 7, 10, 11)
- Jim Jordan – assistant engineer (4, 7, 10, 11)
- Bryan McConkey – assistant engineer (4, 7, 10, 11)
- Darren Redfield – assistant engineer (4, 7, 10, 11)
- Leslie Richter – assistant engineer (4, 7, 10, 11), recording assistant (13)
- Jessie Gorman – recording assistant (13)
- Toshiaki Kasai – recording assistant (13)
- Kevin Szymanski – recording assistant (13)
- Jimmy Hoyson – string recording assistant (13)
- Jay Goin – mix assistant (13)

== Charts ==
=== Weekly charts ===
Chart (2002)	Peak position
US Billboard 200	16
US Top Country Albums (Billboard)	2

=== Year-end charts ===
Chart (2002)	Position
Canadian Country Albums (Nielsen SoundScan)	48
US Top Country Albums (Billboard)	40
