= All the Trouble =

Single by Lee Ann Womack

from the album The Lonely, the Lonesome & the Gone
- Released: August 2017
- Genre: Country
- Length: 5:41
- Label: ATO
- Songwriter(s): Waylon Payne; Lee Ann Womack; Adam Wright
- Producer(s): Frank Liddell

Lee Ann Womack singles chronology
| "Chances Are" (2015) | "All the Trouble" (2017) | "Sunday" (2017) |

"All the Trouble" is a song by American country music artist Lee Ann Womack. It was composed by Waylon Payne, Adam Wright and Womack. In 2017, it was released as a single via ATO Records and was the lead track of Womack's album, The Lonely, the Lonesome & the Gone. The song received positive reviews from writers and journalists.

== Background and content ==
"All the Trouble" was co-written by Womack, along with Waylon Payne and Adam Wright. Womack had not focused her time on writing until deciding to choose songs for her 2017 album. Her husband (and producer), Frank Liddell, encouraged Womack to compose original material: "I used to write a lot, and then when I got caught up in a commercial career and also having kids and everything, it sort of takes away a lot of time, so I got away from it," she recalled. "All the Trouble" was recorded at Sugar Hill Studios, located in Houston, Texas. The sessions for the song were produced by Liddell.

== Critical reception ==
"All the Trouble" received positive reviews from critics and journalists following its release. Thom Jurek of Allmusic remarked that it was "a honky tonk weeper, rendered inconsolable in Womack's delivery." Remy Rendeiro of American Songwriter called the track "a bluesy scorcher." Rolling Stone's Stephen L. Betts called the track "a riveting blues tune." Jewly Hight of NPR praised Womack's vocal performance on the song: "In 'All The Trouble,' from the upcoming album by Lee Ann Womack, one of country music's finest voices, she makes her entrance a cappella, sounding deflated beneath the crushing weight of her burdens," she wrote.

== Release and music video ==
"All the Trouble" was issued as a single via ATO Records in August 2017. It was the lead single released off her 2017 album, The Lonely, the Lonesome & the Gone. The album was released in October 2017, also on ATO. In promotion of the single and album, Womack toured during the fall of 2017 through the spring of 2018. Despite its single release, "All the Trouble" did not reach any peak chart positions, notably on the Billboard Hot Country Songs chart (where most of Womack's singles appeared). A music video was later released for the song in January 2018.

== Track listing ==
Digital download single

- "All the Trouble" – 5:41
