= The Wrong Girl =

- Digital cover

Single by Lee Ann Womack

from the album Greatest Hits
- B-side: "The Last Time"
- Released: February 17, 2004
- Recorded: 2003
- Studio: Ocean Way Nashville; Essential Sound (Nashville, TN)
- Genre: Country
- Length: 3:00
- Label: MCA Nashville
- Songwriters: Liz Rose; Pat McLaughlin
- Producer: Byron Gallimore

Lee Ann Womack singles chronology
"Forever Everyday" (2002)	"The Wrong Girl" (2004)	"I May Hate Myself in the Morning" (2004)

Alternative cover
- MCA promotional cover

"The Wrong Girl" is a song by the American country music recording artist Lee Ann Womack. It was written by Liz Rose and Pat McLaughlin, and produced by Byron Gallimore. It was released on February 17, 2004, as the lead and only single from her Greatest Hits compilation album, released via MCA Nashville on May 4, 2004. It reached a peak of number 24 on the Billboard Hot Country Songs chart. To promote the song, Womack performed it at the Grand Ole Opry and The Tonight Show with Jay Leno.

== Content ==
"The Wrong Girl" is about a guy who is told to have it all (a great apartment, a nice car, the job he's always wanted, etc.) but Womack sings that she doesn't think so, claiming he has "the wrong girl."

== Critical reception ==
Deborah Evans Price of Billboard gave the song a positive review and wrote, "Womack has one of the most glorious country female voices to come along since Tammy Wynette and Loretta Lynn. Like those legendary predecessors, she has a knack for combining vulnerability and sassy strength. Womack is the right girl for country radio, and this is the right song."

== Chart performance ==
"The Wrong Girl" debuted at number 57 on the US Billboard Hot Country Songs chart the week of February 21, 2004. The song reached its peak position of number 24 on the chart week dated May 22, 2004.

== Personnel ==
Taken from the Greatest Hits booklet.

- B. James Lowry – acoustic guitar
- Brent Mason – electric guitar
- Glenn Worf – bass guitar
- Lonnie Wilson – drums
- Steve Nathan – keyboards
- Paul Franklin – steel guitar
- Larry Franklin – fiddle
- Byron Gallimore – producer

== Charts ==
=== Weekly charts ===
Weekly chart performance for "The Wrong Girl"
Chart (2004)	Peak position
Canada Country (Radio & Records)	30
US Hot Country Songs (Billboard)	24

=== Year-end charts ===
Year-end chart performance for "The Wrong Girl"
Chart (2004)	Position
US Country (Radio & Records)	89
US Country Songs (Billboard)	90
