= The Lonely, the Lonesome & the Gone =

Studio album by Lee Ann Womack
- Released: October 27, 2017
- Studio: SugarHill (Houston, Texas)
- Genre: Country blues, Americana, countrypolitan, country soul
- Length: 53:37
- Label: ATO
- Producer: Frank Liddell

Lee Ann Womack chronology
Trouble in Mind (2015)	The Lonely, the Lonesome & the Gone (2017)

Singles from The Lonely, the Lonesome & the Gone
- 1. "All the Trouble" Released: August 2017; 2. "Sunday" Released: 2017; 3. "Hollywood" Released: 2017

Professional ratings
Aggregate scores
Source	Rating
Metacritic	77/100
Review scores
Source	Rating
AllMusic	4.5/5 stars
American Songwriter	4.5/5 stars
PopMatters	8/10

The Lonely, the Lonesome & the Gone is the ninth studio album by the American country music singer-songwriter Lee Ann Womack. It was released on October 27, 2017, by ATO Records. It was available to stream a week before on NPR.org as part of its First Listen series.

The album was nominated for Best Americana Album and Best American Roots Song for "All the Trouble" at the 61st Annual Grammy Awards.

== Background ==
Speaking about the album, Womack said, "I wanted to get out of Nashville, and tap the deep music and vibe of East Texas. I wanted to make sure this record had a lot of soul in it, because real country music has soul. I wanted to remind people of that." "All the Trouble", which was written by Womack, Waylon Payne and Adam Wright, is the lead single from the album. The album consists of 14 songs.

"Take the Devil Out of Me" is a cover version of a George Jones song. "Long Black Veil" is a cover version of a Lefty Frizzell's song which was also notably recorded by Johnny Cash.

== Commercial performance ==
The album debuted at No. 37 on the Billboard Top Country Albums chart, selling 3,200 copies in the first week. It had sold 10,100 copies in the US up to March 2018.

== Track listing ==
The Lonely, the Lonesome & the Gone
No.	Title	Writer(s)	Length
1.	"All the Trouble"	Lee Ann Womack, Waylon Payne, Adam Wright	5:41
2.	"The Lonely, The Lonesome & The Gone"	Wright, Jay Knowles	3:49
3.	"He Called Me Baby"	Harlan Howard	4:40
4.	"Hollywood"	Womack, Waylon Payne, Wright	4:05
5.	"End of the End of the World"	Wright	2:18
6.	"Bottom of the Barrel"	Brent Cobb, Mando Saenz	3:19
7.	"Shine On Rainy Day"	Cobb, Andrew Combs	3:20
8.	"Mama Lost Her Smile"	Womack, Payne, Wright	4:02
9.	"Wicked"	Womack, Wright	4:07
10.	"Long Black Veil"	Danny Dill, Marijohn Wilkin	4:38
11.	"Someone Else's Heartache"	Womack, Dale Dodson, Dani Flowers	3:55
12.	"Sunday"	Womack, Payne, Wright	4:17
13.	"Talking Behind Your Back"	Womack, Dodson, Dean Dillon	3:49
14.	"Take the Devil Out of Me"	George Jones	1:37
Total length:			53:37

== Personnel ==
Credits adapted from album liner notes.

Musicians

- Ethan Ballinger — guitar, kayagum, backing vocals
- Shawn Camp — backing vocals
- Christina Courtin — string section arrangements
- Glen Duncan — fiddle
- Paul Franklin — steel guitar
- Annalise Liddell — guitar, backing vocals
- Frank Liddell — guitar, backing vocals, producer
- Ann McCrary — backing vocals
- Regina McCrary — backing vocals
- Alfreda McCrary — backing vocals
- Buddy Miller — backing vocals
- Charlie Pate — backing vocals
- Waylon Payne — guitar, backing vocals
- Jerry Roe — drums
- Lee Ann Womack — lead vocals
- Glenn Worf — bass
- Adam Wright — keyboards, tremolo guitar, backing vocals
- Shannon Wright — backing vocals

Other credits

- Gavin Lurssen — mastering engineer
- Mike McCarthy — recording engineer, mixing engineer
- Eric Masse — editing

== Reception ==
Brittney McKenna of NPR wrote that the album "has a cinematic quality to it, one buoyed by both lush, dynamic arrangements and by a skillfully executed sequence." Metacritic gives the album a score of 77, based upon seven critics that provided generally favorable reviews.

== Charts ==
Chart (2017)	Peak position
US Top Country Albums (Billboard)	37
US Americana/Folk Albums (Billboard)	8
