= One Dream (Ernie Smith song) =

1971 No.1 hit in Jamaica

"One Dream" is a song by Ernie Smith which was a No.1 hit in Jamaica. The song was covered as a single by Tommy McCook (1971) and again by Count Prince Miller (1971).
