= The Season for Romance =

Studio album by Lee Ann Womack
- Released: October 29, 2002
- Genre: Christmas; country
- Length: 37:52
- Label: MCA Nashville
- Producer: Frank Liddell, Mike McCarthy, Matt Serletic, Lee Ann Womack, Mark Wright

Lee Ann Womack chronology
Something Worth Leaving Behind (2002)	The Season for Romance (2002)	Greatest Hits (2004)

The Season for Romance is the fifth studio album, and first Christmas album, from Lee Ann Womack, released in 2002. It was released two months after her fourth studio album, Something Worth Leaving Behind.

== Track listing ==
1. "The Season for Romance" (Phil Swann, Greg Barnhill) – 4:09
2. "Baby, It's Cold Outside" (Frank Loesser) – 3:45
  - duet with Harry Connick, Jr.
3. "Let It Snow/Winter Wonderland" (Dick Smith, Felix Bernard, Sammy Cahn, Jule Styne) – 4:23
4. "Have Yourself a Merry Little Christmas" (Hugh Martin, Ralph Blane) – 4:29
5. "Silent Night" (Franz Gruber, Joseph Mohr) – 2:30
6. "White Christmas" (Irving Berlin) – 4:25
7. "Forever Christmas Eve" (Swann, Barnhill) – 4:28
8. "The Man with the Bag" (Dudley Brooks, Hal Stanley, Irving Taylor) – 2:31
9. "The Christmas Song" (Mel Tormé, Robert Wells) – 4:01
10. "What Are You Doing New Year's Eve?" (Loesser) – 4:31

== Reception ==
Professional ratings
Review scores
Source	Rating
AllMusic	3/5 stars

Editors at The Gazette gave the album three and a half stars and wrote, "Womack casts aside most of her country roots and offers up the kind of seasonal album recorded years ago by singers named Frank, Tony and Ella. Two songs, the quiet title track and Forever Christmas Eve, have their debut here. The rest are nice versions of old chestnuts that have been heard before many an open fire." Michael MacLean of Maclean's gave the album a positive review and wrote, "Possibly the most tasteful release this year is Lee Ann Womack's The Season for Romance." Melinda Newman of Billboard gave the album a positive review and praised the title track.

== Charts ==
Chart (2002)	Peak position
US Billboard 200	166
US Top Country Albums	19
