= I Hope You Dance =

2000 single by Lee Ann Womack

Single by Lee Ann Womack featuring Sons of the Desert

from the album I Hope You Dance
- B-side: "Lonely Too"
- Written: September 1999
- Released: March 2000
- Studio: Javelina (Nashville, Tennessee)
- Genre: Country pop
- Length: 4:54 (album version); 3:59 (radio edit)
- Label: MCA Nashville
- Songwriters: Mark D. Sanders; Tia Sillers
- Producer: Mark Wright

Lee Ann Womack singles chronology
"Don't Tell Me" (1999)	"I Hope You Dance" (2000)	"Ashes by Now" (2000)

Sons of the Desert singles chronology
"Everybody's Gotta Grow up Sometime" (1999)	"I Hope You Dance" (2000)	"What I Did Right" (2001)

Music video
- "I Hope You Dance" on YouTube

"I Hope You Dance" is a crossover country pop song written by Mark D. Sanders and Tia Sillers and recorded by American country music singer Lee Ann Womack with Sons of the Desert. (Drew and Tim Womack of Sons of the Desert are not related to Lee Ann.) Released in March 2000, it was the first single from Womack's 2000 album, I Hope You Dance. The song reached number one on both the Billboard Hot Country Singles & Tracks and Hot Adult Contemporary Tracks charts, and also reached number fourteen on the Billboard Hot 100. It is considered to be Womack's signature song, and it is the only Billboard number one for both Womack and Sons of the Desert.

"I Hope You Dance" won the 2001 Country Music Association (CMA) Award for Single of the Year, as well as the Academy of Country Music (ACM), Nashville Songwriters Association International (NSAI), and Broadcast Music Incorporated (BMI) awards for Song of the Year. It also won the Grammy Award for Best Country Song and was nominated for Grammy Award for Song of the Year. "I Hope You Dance" is ranked 352 in the list Songs of the Century compiled by Recording Industry Association of America (RIAA). "I Hope You Dance" reached its 2 million sales mark in the United States in October 2015, and as of August 2016, it has sold 2,093,000 digital copies in the US.

== Background ==
Womack told The Today Show, "You can't hear those lyrics and not think about children and—and—and hope for the future and things you want for them. And those are the things I want for them in life. I want them to feel small when they stand beside the ocean." She also said, "Sometimes I have fun and lighthearted things. But even 'I Hope You Dance.' I was so shocked to see the way the kids got it. When—when I say kids, I mean, you know, like teenagers. And we saw a big difference in our audience and—and the young kids that were coming out to the shows and really into 'I Hope You Dance.' It turned into like a prom and graduation theme." Womack told The Early Show, "I thought it was very special. It made me think about Aubrie and Anna Lise [her daughters]. And I—I didn't know—I can't predict if something's going to be a big hit or not. But it certainly hit home with a lot of people, connected with a lot of people and took me a lot of new places that I had not been able to go before and took my career to a new level."

Womack told Billboard, "It made me think about my daughters and the different times in their lives....But it can be so many things to different people. Certainly, it can represent everything a parent hopes for their child, but it can also be for a relationship that's ending as a fond wish for the other person's happiness or for someone graduating, having a baby, or embarking on a new path. It fits almost every circumstance I can think of."

In 2006 Womack told Billboard about an incident at the Country Radio Seminar, recalling that, after a night of drinking, "I completely blanked out on the lyrics of 'I Hope You Dance,' of all songs. Lucky for me, most of the audience was hung over too and had a good sense of humor about it."

== Composition ==
"I Hope You Dance" is a mid-tempo country pop ballad in which the narrator expresses her wishes to an unknown "you." It was not written as a song from a parent to a child. Over time it has been adopted as a song for people who've lost someone, a song that encourages survivors to live life to its fullest.

Two versions of Womack's recording were released. The original version features Sons of the Desert (who, like Womack, were signed to MCA at the time) singing a counterpoint chorus alongside Womack's main chorus, while a second version of the song released for pop radio omits the counterpoint chorus in favor of background vocals to accompany the main chorus. The song was also Sons of the Desert's first Top 40 country hit since "Leaving October" in 1998. The music video features Lee Ann Womack singing the song to her daughters.

== Critical reception ==
Deborah Evans Price of Billboard gave the song a positive review and wrote, "This is a career record. Years from now, when critics are discussing Womack's vocal gifts and impressive body of work, this is a song that will stand out. It's one of those life-affirming songs that makes you pause and take stock of how you're living. It's filled with lovely poetry that will make listeners think. It's a great song, and Womack does it justice. Her sweet, vulnerable voice perfectly captures the tender sentiment of the lyric. The production is clean and understated, letting Womack's stunning vocal and the great lyric take center stage. Excellence deserves to be rewarded." For its pop release, Chuck Taylor of the publication gave it a positive review and commended how it still kept the meaningful lyrics and how "it should not be missed". Ken Barnes of USA Today listed "I Hope You Dance" as the fourth best song of 2000 and wrote, "Uplifting message song whose greeting-card sentiments and imprecise rhymes are outweighed by a gorgeous performance by today's reigning pure-country vocalist." In 2024, Rolling Stone ranked the song at number 75 on its 200 Greatest Country Songs of All Time ranking.

Singer-songwriter John Darnielle of the band the Mountain Goats said that he "hated everything about this song". He wrote the song "No Children" (2002) after changing the titular lyric to "I hope you die" and building a song around that spiteful perspective.

== Chart performance ==
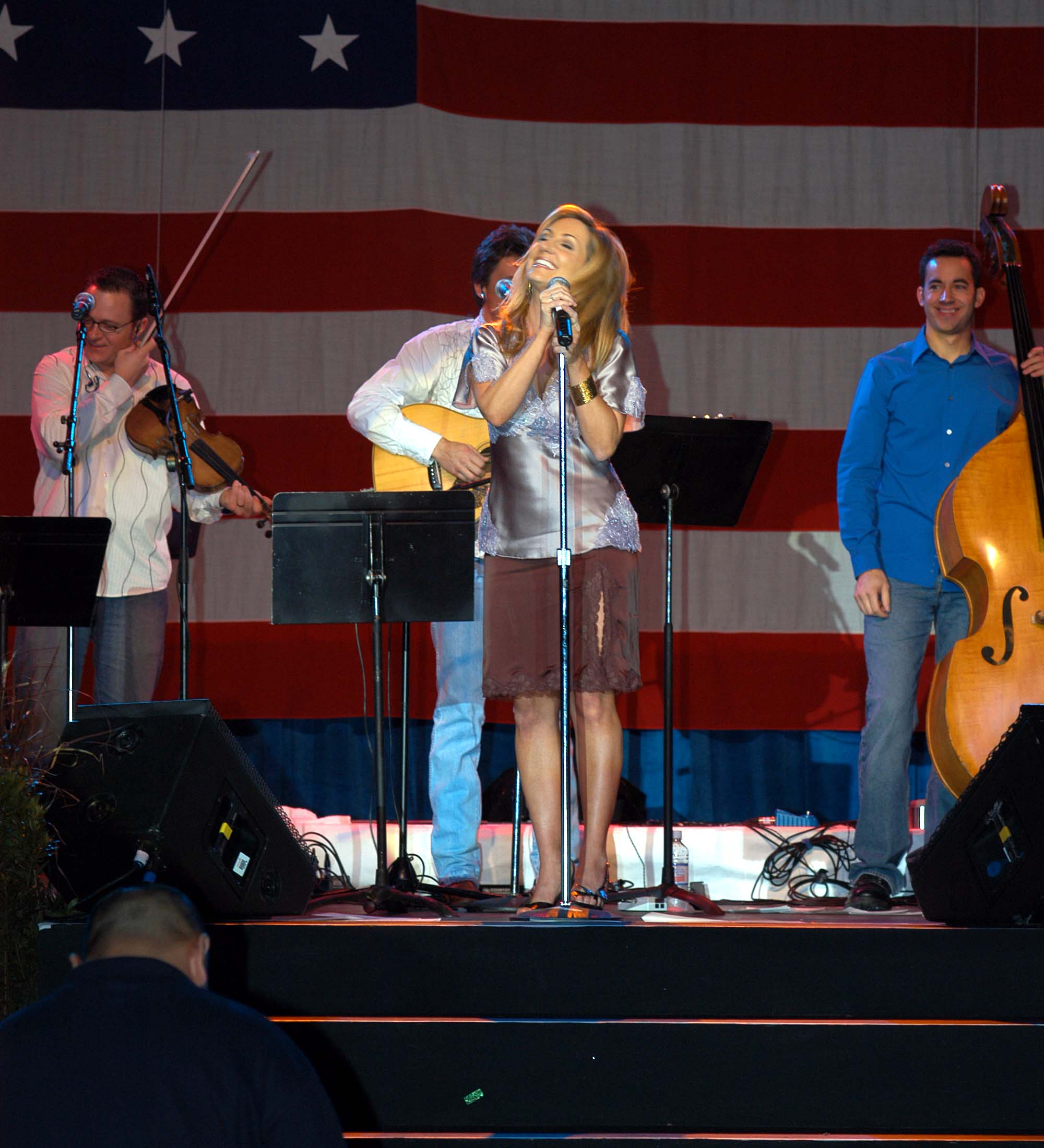
Womack became the first American artist to have the number-one year-end Adult Contemporary song since 1997.

"I Hope You Dance" debuted at number 56 on the US Billboard Hot Country Songs chart, then known as Hot Country Singles & Tracks, the week of March 25, 2000, becoming the "Hot Shot Debut" of the week. It entered the top-ten of the chart the week of June 3, 2000, at number 8, becoming her first top ten single since "I'll Think of a Reason Later" (1999). It was one of her fastest runs to the top-ten. On July 8, 2000, the track would top the chart, displacing Chad Brock's "Yes!" It became Womack's first and only number one single following four singles peaking at number 2, "The Fool", "You've Got to Talk to Me", "A Little Past Little Rock", and "I'll Think of a Reason Later". All of those songs except "You've Got to Talk to Me" did however top the Radio & Records country airplay chart. It is also Sons of the Desert's only number one single although they were featured as background vocals on Ty Herndon's 1998 number one single "It Must Be Love". The track spent an extended five week run atop the chart and overall spent 32 weeks on the chart. It ended 2000 as the seventh most played song on country radio.

The track also became a crossover success. It topped the Adult Contemporary airplay chart for 11 weeks straight and ended 2001 as the most played song on A/C radio, making Womack the first American artist since Toni Braxton to have the number one song on the year-end chart. It also had moderate success on pop radio, hitting number 24 on the Pop Airplay chart. All of this led the track to peak as high as number 14 on the Billboard Hot 100, becoming Womack's biggest hit to date. Internationally, the track entered the charts in Australia, New Zealand, the Netherlands, and the United Kingdom

== Music video ==
Directed by Gerry Wenner in Nashville and featuring an elongated mix of the song, running for nearly five minutes, the music video features Womack singing while in a blue room, as well as playing, frolicking, and sleeping with her two daughters. Other scenes feature her oldest daughter Aubrie carrying her youngest Anna Lise into a gated area to watch a ballet show somewhat reminiscent of "Swan Lake".

== Live performances ==
Womack performed the song at The Early Show on October 4, 2000. It was also performed on The Tonight Show in June 2000. In July 2016, Womack performed the song with Rachel Platten in a medley with Platten's "Stand by You" on the short-lived ABC series Greatest Hits.

== Book ==
A self-help book edition of "I Hope You Dance" was published in October 2000. The book, written by Sillers and Sanders with an introduction by Womack, includes a CD with the acoustic version of the song performed by Womack.

== Awards and nominations ==
Year	Nominee / work	Award	Result
2000	Country Music Association Awards	Single of the Year	Won
2001	43rd Annual Grammy Awards	Best Country Song	Won
2001	43rd Annual Grammy Awards	Song of the Year	Nominated
2001	Academy of Country Music Awards	Song of the Year	Won
2001	BMI Country Awards	Song of the Year	Won
2001	Nashville Songwriters Association International Awards	Song of the Year	Won

== Track listings ==
US CD and cassette single

1. "I Hope You Dance" (pop version) – 4:04
2. "I Hope You Dance" (album version) – 4:54

US 7-inch single

A. "I Hope You Dance" (album version) – 4:54
B. "Lonely Too" – 3:27

UK CD single

1. "I Hope You Dance" (Rawling mix: radio edit) – 4:05
2. "I Hope You Dance" (UK pop version) – 3:57
3. "I Hope You Dance" (original radio edit) – 3:59
4. "I Hope You Dance" (Rawling club mix) – 7:25

Australian maxi-CD single

1. "I Hope You Dance" (US pop version) – 3:59
2. "I Hope You Dance" (UK pop version) – 4:47
3. "I Hope You Dance" (album version) – 4:54
4. "Why They Call It Love" – 1:00
5. "Ashes by Now" (snippet) – 1:22
6. "After I Fall" (snippet) – 1:02

== Personnel ==
Personnel are adapted from the I Hope You Dance liner notes.

- David Campbell – string section arrangements
- Mark Casstevens – acoustic guitar
- Lisa Cochran – harmony vocals
- Chad Cromwell – drums
- Eric Darken — percussion
- Pat Flynn – acoustic guitar
- Paul Franklin – pedal steel guitar
- Brent Mason – electric guitar
- Steve Nathan – keyboards
- Michael Omartian – accordion
- Michael Rhodes – bass
- Lisa Silver – harmony vocals
- Doug Verden – harmony vocals
- Bergen White – harmony vocals
- Drew Womack – harmony vocals
- Lee Ann Womack – lead vocals
- Tim Womack – harmony vocals
- Nashville String Machine – string section

== Charts ==
=== Weekly charts ===
==== Lee Ann Womack with Sons of the Desert ====
Chart (2000–2001)	Peak position
Canada Country Singles (RPM)	1
US Billboard Hot 100	14
US Hot Country Songs (Billboard)	1
US Top Country Singles Sales (Billboard)	1
US Country Top 50 (Radio & Records)	1

==== Lee Ann Womack ====
Chart (2000–2001)	Peak position
Australia (ARIA)	65
Canada Adult Contemporary (RPM)	75
Netherlands (Single Top 100)	89
New Zealand (Recorded Music NZ)	44
Scottish Singles Sales (Official Charts)	30
UK Singles (Official Charts)	40
US Adult Contemporary (Billboard)	1
US Adult Pop Airplay (Billboard)	13
US Pop Airplay (Billboard)	24

Chart (2021–2022)	Peak position
Canada Digital Song Sales (Billboard)	16
US Digital Song Sales (Billboard)	16

=== Year-end charts ===
Chart (2000)	Position
US Billboard Hot 100	87
US Hot Country Singles & Tracks (Billboard)	7
US All-Format (Billboard)	56
US Country (Radio & Records)	8
US Adult Contemporary (Radio & Records)	84

Chart (2001)	Position
Canada Radio (Nielsen BDS)	39
US Billboard Hot 100	32
US Adult Contemporary (Billboard)	1
US Adult Top 40 (Billboard)	33
US Mainstream Top 40 (Billboard)	100
US Top Country Singles Sales (Billboard)	4
US Adult Contemporary (Radio & Records)	1
US CHR/Pop (Radio & Records)	78
US Hot AC (Radio & Records)	25

Chart (2002)	Position
US Adult Contemporary (Billboard)	7
US Adult Contemporary (Radio & Records)	7

== Certifications ==
Region	Certification	Certified units/sales
United States (RIAA) Physical	Platinum	1,000,000^{^}
United States (RIAA) Digital	4× Platinum	4,000,000^{‡}
^{^} Shipments figures based on certification alone.^{‡} Sales+streaming figures based on certification alone.

== Release history ==
Region	Date	Format(s)	Label(s)	Ref(s).
United States	March 2000	Country radio	MCA Nashville	
United States	October 9, 2000	Adult contemporary; hot adult contemporary radio	MCA Nashville	
United States	November 14, 2000	Contemporary hit radio	MCA Nashville	

== Ronan Keating version ==
"I Hope You Dance"

Single by Ronan Keating

from the album 10 Years of Hits
- Released: September 27, 2004
- Length: 3:34
- Label: Polydor
- Songwriters: Mark D. Sanders; Tia Sillers
- Producer: Steve Mac

Ronan Keating singles chronology
"Last Thing on My Mind" (2004)	"I Hope You Dance" (2004)	"Father and Son" (2004)

Music video
- "I Hope You Dance" on YouTube

"I Hope You Dance" was covered by Irish singer-songwriter Ronan Keating and released as the first single from his greatest hits compilation, 10 Years of Hits (2004). The single was released on September 27, 2004, peaking at number two on the UK Singles Chart. The single featured a new version of "This Is Your Song", a song recorded when Keating lost his mother in 1998. Royalties from sales of the single were donated to the organization Breast Cancer Care.

=== Track listings ===
UK CD single

1. "I Hope You Dance" – 3:34
2. "This Is Your Song" – 3:58
3. "I Hope You Dance" (Mothership mix) – 3:54

European CD single

1. "I Hope You Dance" – 3:34
2. "This Is Your Song" – 3:58

=== Charts ===
==== Weekly charts ====
Chart (2004)	Peak position
Europe (Eurochart Hot 100)	6
Germany (GfK)	52
Hungary (Rádiós Top 40)	29
Ireland (IRMA)	4
Netherlands (Single Top 100)	84
Romania (Romanian Top 100)	77
Scottish Singles Sales (Official Charts)	2
Switzerland (Schweizer Hitparade)	49
UK Singles (Official Charts)	2
UK Airplay (Music Week)	17

==== Year-end charts ====
Chart (2004)	Position
Taiwan (Hito Radio)	81
UK Singles (OCC)	116

== See also ==
- List of Billboard Adult Contemporary number ones of 2001
