= Something Worth Leaving Behind (song) =

Single by Lee Ann Womack

from the album Something Worth Leaving Behind
- B-side: "He'll Be Back"
- Released: May 24, 2002
- Genre: Country
- Length: 3:50
- Label: MCA Nashville
- Songwriters: Brett Beavers, Tom Douglas
- Producer: Frank Liddell

Lee Ann Womack singles chronology
"Does My Ring Burn Your Finger" (2001)	"Something Worth Leaving Behind" (2002)	"Forever Everyday" (2002)

"Something Worth Leaving Behind" is a song written by Brett Beavers and Tom Douglas, and recorded by American country music artist Lee Ann Womack. It was released in May 2002 as the first single and title track from her album of the same name. The song peaked at number 20 on the Billboard Hot Country Singles & Tracks.

== Background ==
Womack told Billboard, "It's a good message and one that I am glad to deliver. I hope to have a lot of those kinds of songs over the course of my career."

== Critical reception ==
Chuck Taylor of Billboard gave the song a positive review and wrote, "The outstanding song has a haunting, memorable melody and a great lyric, starting with the opening lines. It's a lyric with a poignant sentiment, and Womack delivers it beautifully. She possesses one of the most compelling country female voices to come along in quite a while-vulnerable one minute, compelling and gutsy the next. This should quickly become the next hit on what will no doubt become a lengthy parade for this talented artist."

== Chart performance ==
The song debuted at number 54 during the week of May 24, 2002.

Chart (2002)	Peak position
US Hot Country Songs (Billboard)	20
US Bubbling Under Hot 100 (Billboard)	14
