= Frank Liddell =

American record producer (born 1963)

- Born: Frank Austin Liddell III; November 13, 1963 (age 62); Houston, Texas, U.S.
- Origin: Nashville, Tennessee
- Genres: Country
- Occupation: Record producer
- Years active: 1990s-present
- Spouse: Lee Ann Womack (m. 1999)

Frank Austin Liddell III (born November 13, 1963) is an American record producer. A former artists and repertoire director at Decca Records, he founded Carnival Music in 1999. Liddell is also married to singer Lee Ann Womack, for whom he has produced. Other acts that Liddell produces include Eli Young Band, David Nail, and the first six studio albums by Miranda Lambert.

Liddell won the Grammy Award for Best Country Album in 2015 for Lambert's Platinum. He has also won the Academy of Country Music's Album of the Year award six times: for Crazy Ex-Girlfriend in 2008, Revolution in 2010, Four the Record in 2012, Platinum in 2015, The Weight of These Wings in 2017, and Parker McCollum's self-titled album in 2026.

== Production discography ==
=== Aubrie Sellers ===
- New City Blues (2016)
- Far From Home (2020)

=== David Nail ===
- I'm About to Come Alive (2009)
- The Sound of a Million Dreams (2011)
- I'm a Fire (2014)
- Fighter (2016)

=== Eli Young Band ===
- Life at Best (2011)
- 10,000 Towns (2014)

=== Kellie Pickler ===
- 100 Proof (2012)
- The Woman I Am (2013)

=== Lee Ann Womack ===
- I Hope You Dance (2000)
- Something Worth Leaving Behind (2002)
- The Season for Romance (2002)
- Greatest Hits (2004)
- The Way I'm Livin' (2014)
- Trouble in Mind (2015)
- The Lonely, the Lonesome & the Gone (2017)

=== Miranda Lambert ===
- Kerosene (2005)
- Crazy Ex-Girlfriend (2007)
- Revolution (2009)
- Four the Record (2011)
- Platinum (2014)
- The Weight of These Wings (2016)

=== Pistol Annies ===
- Hell on Heels (2011)
- Annie Up (2013)
- Interstate Gospel (2018)

=== Others ===
- Chris Knight - Chris Knight (1998)
- Electric - Jack Ingram (2002)
- See the Light - Bo Bice (2007)
- Beginning of Things - Charlie Worsham (2017)
- Restoration: Reimagining the Songs of Elton John and Bernie Taupin (2018)
