= Buckaroo (song) =

Single by Lee Ann Womack

from the album Lee Ann Womack
- B-side: "Make Memories with Me"
- Released: April 4, 1998
- Genre: Country
- Length: 2:59
- Label: Decca
- Songwriters: Ed Hill, Mark D. Sanders
- Producer: Mark Wright

Lee Ann Womack singles chronology
"You've Got to Talk to Me" (1997)	"Buckaroo" (1998)	"A Little Past Little Rock" (1998)

"Buckaroo" is a song recorded by American country music artist Lee Ann Womack. It was released in April 1998 as the fourth single from her 1997 album Lee Ann Womack. The song reached No. 27 on the Billboard Hot Country Singles & Tracks chart. The song was written by Ed Hill and Mark D. Sanders.

== Chart performance ==
Chart (1998)	Peak position
US Hot Country Songs (Billboard)	27
Canadian RPM Country Tracks	34
