= I Hope You Dance (album) =

Studio album by Lee Ann Womack
- Released: May 23, 2000
- Recorded: 1999–2000
- Studio: Sound Kitchen (Franklin, Tennessee); Javelina Studios, House of Gain, Ocean Way Nashville, Starstruck Studios and Woodland Sound Studios (Nashville, Tennessee)
- Genre: Country; country pop
- Length: 43:39
- Label: MCA Nashville
- Producer: Mark Wright; Frank Liddell

Lee Ann Womack chronology
Some Things I Know (1998)	I Hope You Dance (2000)	Something Worth Leaving Behind (2002)

Singles from I Hope You Dance
- 1. "I Hope You Dance" Released: March 17, 2000; 2. "Ashes by Now" Released: October 9, 2000; 3. "Why They Call It Falling" Released: April 16, 2001; 4. "Does My Ring Burn Your Finger" Released: October 29, 2001

I Hope You Dance is the third studio album by American country music singer Lee Ann Womack. It was released on May 23, 2000, as her first album for MCA Nashville. The title track was a crossover hit in 2000, becoming Womack's only number one single on the Billboard Hot Country Songs chart, while "Ashes by Now", "Why They Call It Falling", and "Does My Ring Burn Your Finger" also peaked in the top 40 region of that chart.

== Background ==
Womack told Billboard: "Frank [Liddell] doesn't look for hits; he looks for great songs. He's into making albums, not hit singles. So hopefully what people will see with this project is that it is an album. There are a lot of great songs on there that won't even be singles. You've got to listen to the album to get them." She also stated, "I'm very, very glad I spent that time and didn't come right back out with a new album right after Decca closed. I didn't rush in to make an album. We took a lot of time. I wanted to get it right. It's different for each person, but I think because I did take the time and the care to take care of both of those things as best I could, I feel like some good things are coming in the future."

== Content ==
The first single release from the album was the title track. Featuring guest vocals from then-labelmates Sons of the Desert, "I Hope You Dance" became Womack's only number one single on the Billboard Hot Country Songs chart. This song was also a crossover hit, topping the Adult Contemporary charts and reaching #14 on the Billboard Hot 100.

After that song came "Ashes by Now", a cover of a song which was previously a #37 pop hit for Rodney Crowell in 1980. Womack's rendition reached #4 on the country charts and #45 on the pop charts. "Why They Call It Falling" was the album's third single, with a #13 country and #78 pop peak. The #23 country hit "Does My Ring Burn Your Finger", written by Buddy and Julie Miller, was the album's last single release.

"I Feel Like I'm Forgetting Something" is the only track on the album that Womack co-wrote, doing so with ex-husband Jason Sellers and Wynn Varble. "Lord, I Hope This Day Is Good" was originally a number one country hit for Don Williams in 1981.

== Reception ==
Professional ratings
Review scores
Source	Rating
AllMusic	4/5 stars
Robert Christgau	(2-star Honorable Mention)
Entertainment Weekly	A

Mario Tarradell of The Dallas Morning News gave the album an A rating and wrote, "On I Hope You Dance Ms. Womack digs deeper into the heart and soul of country with an album that honours and challenges the genre. She does it with no fanfare. For her, artistry is about timeless songs and potent messages. This is an album rooted in steel guitars and fiddles without sounding retro. Ms. Womack is recording country music for the next century, not from the last one. Good country music is supposed to put everyday highs and lows in melodic perspective. I Hope You Dance does just that." Tarradel also listed it as the number one album of 2000 and wrote, "Ms. Womack made an album from the soul that just happened to work on mainstream country radio. From the gorgeous title track to the tough-yet-tender ache in her Appalachian soprano, this is country music good enough to stand beside the legendary work of the genre's icons." Geoffrey Himes of The Washington Post listed the album as the seventh best album of 2000 and he wrote, "Just when you thought mainstream country was hopelessly bankrupt, along comes this diminutive singer with the immense voice, bringing genuine class to the "Forever Young"-like title-track smash and lending some universality to such alt-country writers as Bruce Robison, Rodney Crowell, and Buddy and Julie Miller. Womack is the new Emmylou Harris."

Greg Quill of The Toronto Star said, "Her new CD I Hope You Dance is a spectacular collection of some of the finest story-songs recently crafted in the country and country folk areas, from veteran hit writers Mark D. Sanders' and Tia Sillers' title track – an achingly uplifting song of hope and goodwill – and country staples, Rodney Crowell's "Ashes By Now" and Ronnie Bowman's "The Healing Kind," to the dark and almost perverse offerings of alt-country icon Buddy Miller's "Does My Ring Burn Your Finger?" Editors at Billboard gave the album a positive review and wrote, From the opening fiddle strains on "The Healing Kind" to the cautious optimism of "Lord I Hope This Day Is Good" 11 tracks later, this is an emotional tour de force and one great country record. Womack's voice is a wonder, and here she makes use of some of Nashville's best writers. Beyond the career-defining title track, this is, without question, a career-defining album-one that should push Womack into the big leagues for good. Ralph Novak of People wrote, "With its rueful tone, evocative songs and emotion-drenched, sweet-voiced vocals, this could have been mistaken for a Dolly Parton album. Who would have guessed it's the erstwhile Texas firebrand Womack in a new mode less suited to honky-tonks than to wedding receptions." Richard Corliss of Time wrote, "Womack's work on this solid set suggests that she's too good for a future in the lounges. She should be playing main rooms for ages to come." Editors at The Straits Times wrote, "No matter how much vocal support she gets, it's her powerhouse voice that rings true. I Hope You Can Dance is a rarity among the current crop of country albums, one that combines the musical sincerity of country heartland with a modern slur without making a wrong turn." Robert Christgau gave the album a two-star honourable mention rating, which corresponds to "a likeable effort consumers attuned to its overriding aesthetic or individual vision may well enjoy."

== Track listing ==
Standard track listing
No.	Title	Writer(s)	Length
1.	"The Healing Kind"	Ronnie Bowman; Greg Luck	3:02
2.	"I Hope You Dance" (featuring Sons of the Desert)	Mark D. Sanders; Tia Sillers	4:54
3.	"After I Fall"	Mark Wright; Bill Kenner; Ronnie Rogers	3:03
4.	"Stronger Than I Am"	Bobbie Cryner	3:37
5.	"I Know Why the River Runs"	Julie Miller	4:57
6.	"Why They Call It Falling"	Don Schlitz; Roxie Dean	3:35
7.	"Ashes by Now"	Rodney Crowell	4:11
8.	"Thinkin' with My Heart Again"	Sanger D. Shafer; Dean Dillon; Donny Kees	2:54
9.	"I Feel Like I'm Forgetting Something"	Lee Ann Womack; Wynn Varble; Jason Sellers	3:30
10.	"Lonely Too"	Bruce Robison	3:28
11.	"Does My Ring Burn Your Finger"	J. Miller; Buddy Miller	3:30
12.	"Lord, I Hope This Day Is Good"	Dave Hanner	2:56
Total length:			43:39

UK edition
No.	Title	Writer(s)	Length
13.	"I Hope You Dance" (The Rawling Mix)	Sanders; Sillers	4:36

Japanese edition
No.	Title	Writer(s)	Length
13.	"I Hope You Dance" (The Rawling Mix)	Sanders; Sillers	4:36
14.	"The Man Who Made My Mama Cry"	Billy Lawson; Womack; Dale Dodson	4:04

== Personnel ==
As listed in liner notes.

- Lee Ann Womack – lead vocals, harmony vocals (6, 9, 10)
- Steve Nathan – keyboards (2, 4, 6, 7, 9), Hammond B3 organ (3), synthesizers (8)
- Michael Omartian – accordion (2)
- Jeff Roach – synthesizers (5), Wurlitzer electric piano (11)
- Pat Flynn – acoustic guitars (1–4, 6–9)
- Dan Tyminski – acoustic guitars (1), harmony vocals (12)
- Brent Mason – electric guitars (1–4, 6–9)
- Mark Casstevens – acoustic guitars (2, 3, 6–9), gut-string guitar (4)
- Richard Bennett – electric guitars (5), acoustic guitars (10), bouzouki (11)
- Kenny Greenberg – electric guitars (5, 10, 11)
- Joe Manuel – electric guitars (9), acoustic guitars (12)
- Paul Franklin – dobro (1), steel guitar (2–11)
- Rusty Danmyer – dobro (12)
- Larry Franklin – mandolin (1, 6), fiddle (1, 4, 5, 7–11)
- John Johnson – mandolin (12)
- Mark Fain – bass (1)
- Michael Rhodes – bass (2, 3, 8)
- Glenn Worf – bass (4–7, 9–11)
- Brett Beavers – bass (12)
- Chad Cromwell – drums (1–3, 5, 8, 10, 11)
- Lonnie Wilson – drums (4, 6, 7, 9)
- Dave Dunsearth – drums (12)
- Eric Darken – percussion (1–3, 7, 12)
- Sam Bacco – percussion (5, 10, 11)
- Aubrey Haynie – fiddle (10)
- The Nashville String Machine – strings (2, 4, 6)
- David Campbell – string arrangements and conductor (2, 6)
- Ricky Skaggs – harmony vocals (1)
- Lisa Cochran – backing vocals (2–4, 7)
- Lisa Silver – backing vocals (2, 4)
- Bergen White – backing vocals (2, 4), string arrangements and conductor (4)
- Doug Virden – backing vocals (2)
- Drew Womack – backing vocals (2)
- Tim Womack – backing vocals (2)
- Gene Miller – backing vocals (3)
- Liana Manis – harmony vocals (4, 5, 8)
- Kevin Montgomery – harmony vocals (5)
- Jason Sellers – harmony vocals (6, 9)
- Bekka Bramlett – backing vocals (7)
- Tabitha Fair – backing vocals (7)
- Marabeth Jordan – backing vocals (7)
- Jon Randall – harmony vocals (10)
- Buddy Miller – harmony vocals (11)
- Julie Miller – harmony vocals (11)
- Ronnie Bowman – harmony vocals (12)

=== Production ===
- Mark Wright – producer (1–4, 6–9, 12)
- Frank Liddell – producer (5, 10, 11)
- James Dutile – enhanced CD producer
- Jeff Balding – recording
- Greg Droman – recording, overdub recording (1–4, 6–9, 12), mixing (1–4, 6–9, 12)
- Mike McCarthy – recording, overdub recording (5, 10, 11), mixing (5, 10, 11)
- Robert Charles – additional engineer
- Steve Crowder – second engineer
- Todd Gunnerson – second engineer
- Jed Hackett – second engineer
- Jody Yesville – second engineer
- Betsy Blood – overdub assistant
- Casey Wood – overdub assistant
- Daniel Kresco – mix assistant
- Hank Williams – mastering at MasterMix (Nashville, Tennessee)
- Travis Hill – project coordinator
- Jessie Noble – project coordinator
- Gina Binkley – design
- Tony Baker – photography
- Gerry Wenner – photography
- Trish Townsend – stylist
- Melissa Schleicher – hair, make-up
- Erv Woolsey – management

== Chart performance ==
The album sold 76,000 copies during its first week.

=== Weekly charts ===
Chart (2000–01)	Peak position
Canadian Country Albums (RPM)	4
US Billboard 200	16
US Top Country Albums (Billboard)	1

=== Year-end charts ===
Year-end chart performance for I Hope You Dance
Chart (2000)	Position
US Billboard 200	114
US Top Country Albums (Billboard)	13

Chart (2001)	Position
Canadian Albums (Nielsen SoundScan)	114
Canadian Country Albums (Nielsen SoundScan)	6
US Billboard 200	65
US Top Country Albums (Billboard)	6

Chart (2002)	Position
Canadian Country Albums (Nielsen SoundScan)	45
US Top Country Albums (Billboard)	44

== Certifications ==
Region	Certification	Certified units/sales
Canada (Music Canada)	Platinum	100,000^{^}
United States (RIAA)	3× Platinum	3,000,000^{^}
^{^} Shipments figures based on certification alone.
