= The Great Divide (Willie Nelson album) =

Studio album by Willie Nelson
- Released: January 2002
- Genre: Country
- Length: 53:34
- Label: Lost Highway
- Producer: Matt Serletic

Willie Nelson chronology
Rainbow Connection (2001)	The Great Divide (2002)	The Eyes of Texas (2002)

Singles from The Great Divide
- 1. "Mendocino County Line" Released: January 21, 2002

The Great Divide is the 50th studio album released in 2002 by American country music singer Willie Nelson. It contains several duets and musical collaborations with artists such as Rob Thomas of Matchbox Twenty, Lee Ann Womack, Kid Rock, Sheryl Crow, Brian McKnight, and Bonnie Raitt. The album produced two chart singles in "Mendocino County Line" and "Maria (Shut Up and Kiss Me)", which respectively reached #22 and #41 on the Hot Country Songs charts. Also included is a cover of "Just Dropped In (To See What Condition My Condition Was In)", previously a hit for Kenny Rogers and the First Edition. The songs "Mendocino County Line," "Last Stand in Open Country," and "This Face" were co-written by Bernie Taupin, the lyricist best known for his collaborations with Elton John.

== Reception ==
Professional ratings
Review scores
Source	Rating
AllMusic	2/5 stars
Rolling Stone	3/5 stars

The album was panned for the excessively adult contemporary production. Pat Blashill of Rolling Stone said, "Nelson is a performer who uses plain, powerful lyrics and a handsome but unvarnished voice to great effect. Much of that gets lost in the adult-contemporary production goop and heavenly choirs" of this release. He also noted that "the best moments here are the ones in which Nelson just does his thing all by his bad self." Stephen Thomas Erlewine of AllMusic said that it is "an accomplished, classy album, but it sure as hell isn't a Willie Nelson album."

== Track listing ==
No.	Title	Writer(s)	Length
1.	"Maria (Shut Up and Kiss Me)"	Rob Thomas	4:20
2.	"Mendocino County Line" (duet with Lee Ann Womack)	Matt Serletic, Bernie Taupin	4:32
3.	"Last Stand in Open Country" (duet with Kid Rock)	Taupin, Jim Cregan, Robin LeMesurier, Dennis Tufano	4:45
4.	"Won't Catch Me Cryin'"	Thomas	4:07
5.	"Be There for You" (duet with Sheryl Crow)	Serletic, Kevin Kadish	4:34
6.	"The Great Divide"	Willie Nelson, Jackie King	4:06
7.	"Just Dropped In (To See What Condition My Condition Was In)"	Mickey Newbury	3:32
8.	"This Face"	Taupin, Cregan, LeMesurier, Tufano	4:29
9.	"Don't Fade Away" (duet with Brian McKnight)	Serletic, Kadish	4:18
10.	"Time After Time"	Cyndi Lauper, Rob Hyman	4:04
11.	"Recollection Phoenix"	Thomas	4:53
12.	"You Remain" (duet with Bonnie Raitt)	Leslie Satcher, Don Poythress	5:54

== Personnel ==
- Willie Nelson - acoustic guitar & vocals
- Michael Black, Louis Dean Nunley, John Wesley Ryles, Lisa Silver, Harry Stinson, The Waters Sisters, Dennis Wilson, Curtis Young - backing vocals
- Heitor Teixeira Peirera - electric & acoustic guitars, whistling, backing vocals
- Reggie Young - guitars
- Dan Dugmore - steel guitar
- Greg Leisz - dobro
- Alison Krauss, Gabe Witcher - fiddle
- Mickey Raphael - harmonica
- Christopher Wade Damerst, Danny Saber - programming
- Matt Rollings - Fender Rhodes, wurlitzer, organ
- Greg Phillinganes - keyboards
- Matt Serletic - electronics, Backing vocals
- Lee Sklar, Neil Stubenhaus - bass guitar
- Kenny Aronoff, John Robinson - drums
- Brad Dutz - percussion
- Bruce Fowler, Dan Higgins - horns
- Orchestra Conducted By Pete Anthony & Matt Serletic; concertmaster: Bruce Dukov

== Production ==
- Produced By Matt Serletic
- Engineered By Mark Dobson, Steve Marcantonio, Dennis Sands & David Thoener, with assistance from David Bryant, Todd Johnson, Tosh Kasai, John Nelson, John Rodd & Sam Story
- Mixed By Derek Carlson, Jay Goin & David Thoener
- Mastered By Stephen Marcussen

== Charts ==
=== Weekly charts ===
Chart (2002)	Peak position
Australian Albums (ARIA)	109
US Billboard 200	43
US Top Country Albums (Billboard)	5

=== Year-end charts ===
Chart (2002)	Position
Canadian Country Albums (Nielsen SoundScan)	82
US Top Country Albums (Billboard)	28
