= Some Things I Know =

Studio album by Lee Ann Womack
- Released: September 22, 1998
- Studios: Javelina Studios, Nashville (basic tracks); House of Gain, Nashville (overdubs); Sound Kitchen, Franklin, Tennessee (mixing)
- Genres: Neotraditional country; honky-tonk; countrypolitan
- Length: 39:04
- Label: Decca Records
- Producer: Mark Wright

Lee Ann Womack chronology
Lee Ann Womack (1997)	Some Things I Know (1998)	I Hope You Dance (2000)

Singles from Some Things I Know
- 1. "A Little Past Little Rock" Released: June 22, 1998; 2. "I'll Think of a Reason Later" Released: December 28, 1998; 3. "(Now You See Me) Now You Don't" Released: August 7, 1999; 4. "Don't Tell Me" Released: October 18, 1999

Some Things I Know is the second album by the American country music artist Lee Ann Womack. It was released on September 22, 1998, and rose to the number 20 position on the Billboard Top Country Albums chart. The album's first two singles, "A Little Past Little Rock" and "I'll Think of a Reason Later," both peaked at number 2 on the U.S. Billboard Hot Country Singles & Tracks chart. The second two singles also charted: "(Now You See Me) Now You Don't" reached number 12, and "Don't Tell Me," hit number 56.

== Background ==
Womack told Billboard, "I didn't venture out too much or change anything, really, but went with the same process as the first: an extensive song search, plus writing with some other writers at Tree."

== Musical style ==
Some Things I Know has been described as a neotraditional country, honky-tonk, and countrypolitan album and is compared to the works of traditional country artists such as Dolly Parton, Loretta Lynn, and Tammy Wynette.

== Critical reception ==
Professional ratings
Review scores
Source	Rating
Allmusic	2.5/5 stars
Christgau's Consumer Guide	(1-star Honorable Mention)
Entertainment Weekly	A
Los Angeles Times	3/4 stars
Country Standard Time	(favorable)

Editors at Billboard gave the album a positive review and wrote, "Lee Ann Womack's sophomore album is a solid collection of bedrock country songs that tap elemental emotions. The current single, 'A Little Past Little Rock,' is a blue-chip country weeper. The real gem here, though, is Bobby Braddock's composition 'I'd Rather Have What We Had.' The writer of such country classics as George Jones' 'He Stopped Loving Her Today,' Braddock has penned a cheating song for the ages with 'I'd Rather Have What We Had.' And Womack brings home the groceries with her emotional delivery." Allmusic's Brian Wahlert was less favorable, saying that "It seems that producer Mark Wright has made an effort to soften Womack's sound to make it more palatable to country radio, but in the process he has removed the soul of her music."

== Track listing ==
No.	Title	Writer(s)	Length
1.	"Some Things I Know" (duet with Vince Gill)	Burton Banks Collins; Sally Barris	3:04
2.	"A Little Past Little Rock" (featuring Jason Sellers)	Brett Jones; Tony Lane; Jess Brown	4:18
3.	"(Now You See Me) Now You Don't"	Lane; Brown; David Lee	2:39
4.	"I'd Rather Have What We Had" (duet with Joe Diffie)	Bobby Braddock	3:17
5.	"The Man Who Made My Mama Cry"	Billy Lawson; Lee Ann Womack; Dale Dodson	4:04
6.	"I'll Think of a Reason Later"	Tony Martin; Tim Nichols	3:37
7.	"Don't Tell Me" (featuring Buddy Miller and Julie Miller)	Buddy Miller; Julie Miller	4:03
8.	"I Keep Forgetting" (duet with Vince Gill)	Jamie O'Hara	3:35
9.	"If You're Ever Down in Dallas"	Womack; Jason Sellers	2:32
10.	"When the Wheels Are Coming Off" (featuring Ricky Skaggs and Sharon White)	Wynn Varble; Randy Hardison; Leslie Satcher	3:39
11.	"The Preacher Won't Have to Lie"	Billy Montana; Steve Dean	4:18
Total length:			39:04

== Personnel ==
Musicians and vocalists

- Lee Ann Womack – vocals
- Steve Nathan – acoustic piano (1, 6, 9, 11), Hammond B3 organ (3)
- Tony Harrell – acoustic piano (2, 4), Wurlitzer electric piano (2, 7), synthesizers (2), Hammond B3 organ (7, 8)
- Hargus Robbins – acoustic piano (5, 10)
- Brent Mason – electric guitars
- Pat Flynn – acoustic guitar (1, 2, 4–11)
- Biff Watson – acoustic guitar (1, 3, 5, 6, 10, 11)
- Mark Casstevens – acoustic guitar (2–4, 7–9), banjo (11)
- Mike Brignardello – bass (1, 4, 5, 10, 11)
- Glenn Worf – bass (2–4, 6–9)
- Paul Franklin – steel guitar
- Lonnie Wilson – drums (1, 4–6, 9–11)
- Chad Cromwell – drums (2, 3, 7, 8)
- Larry Franklin – fiddle (1, 2, 4–11), mandolin (2, 3)
- Kirk "JellyRoll" Johnson – harmonica (2)
- Vince Gill – backing vocals (1, 8)
- Lisa Cochran – backing vocals (2–6, 10)
- Jason Sellers – backing vocals (2)
- Lisa Silver – backing vocals (2–6, 10)
- Bergen White – backing vocals (2–6, 10)
- Liana Manis – backing vocals (3, 5, 9)
- Curtis Young – backing vocals (3, 5, 9)
- Joe Diffie – backing vocals (4)
- Buddy Miller – backing vocals (7)
- Julie Miller – backing vocals (7)
- Ricky Skaggs – backing vocals (10)
- Sharon White Skaggs – backing vocals (10)
- Scotty Emerick – backing vocals (11)
- Mark Wright – backing vocals (11)

The Nashville String Machine (Tracks 1, 2, 5 & 11)

- Bergen White – arrangements
- Carl Gorodetzky – conductor
- David Angell, Monisa Angell, John Catchings, David Davidson, Lee Larrison, Bob Mason, Cate Myer, Pamela Sixfin, Alan Umstead, Catherine Umstead, Gary Vanosdale, Mary Kathryn Vanosdale and Kristin Wilkinson – string players

=== Production ===
- Mark Wright – producer
- Greg Droman – recording, mixing
- Warren Peterson – string recording (1, 2, 5, 11)
- Robert Charles – second engineer
- Tim Coyle – second overdub engineer
- Ronnie Thomas – digital editing
- Hank Williams – mastering
- MasterMix (Nashville, Tennessee) – editing and mastering location
- John Drioli – project coordinator
- Brandi Thomas – project coordinator
- Buddy Jackson – art direction
- Karinne Caulkins – design
- Matthew Barnes – photography
- Melanie Shelley – hair, make-up
- Sheri McCoy-Haynes – stylist
- Libby Joyner – stylist
- Erv Woolsey – management

== Charts ==
=== Weekly charts ===
Chart (1998)	Peak position
US Billboard 200	136
US Top Country Albums (Billboard)	20
US Heatseekers Albums (Billboard)	5

=== Year-end charts ===
Chart (1999)	Position
US Top Country Albums (Billboard)	47

== Certifications ==
Region	Certification	Certified units/sales
United States (RIAA)	Gold	500,000^{^}
^{^} Shipments figures based on certification alone.
