= (Now You See Me) Now You Don't =

Single by Lee Ann Womack

from the album Some Things I Know
- B-side: "The Preacher Won't Have to Lie"
- Released: August 7, 1999
- Genre: Country
- Length: 2:38
- Label: MCA Nashville
- Songwriters: Tony Lane, Jess Brown, David Lee
- Producer: Mark Wright

Lee Ann Womack singles chronology
"I'll Think of a Reason Later" (1998)	"(Now You See Me) Now You Don't" (1999)	"Don't Tell Me" (1999)

"(Now You See Me) Now You Don't" is a song written by Tony Lane, Jess Brown and David Lee, and recorded by American country music artist Lee Ann Womack. It was released in August 1999 as the third single from her CD Some Things I Know. The song peaked at number 12 on the Billboard Hot Country Singles & Tracks.

== Critical reception ==
Editors at Billboard gave the song a positive review and wrote, "Clocking in under three minutes, it's a short, saucy little number with a lively melody, excellent guitar work, and a clever lyric about a woman on her way out of a sour relationship. Womack's voice is a combination of childlike vulnerability and spurned-woman desperation as she perfectly conveys the emotion in the lyric. This has all the elements necessary to become a summertime hit--and possibly Womack's long-awaited chart-topper."

== Personnel ==
Credits adapted from Some Things I Know liner notes.

- Mark Casstevens — acoustic guitar
- Lisa Cochran — harmony vocals
- Chad Cromwell — drums
- Paul Franklin — pedal steel guitar
- Larry Franklin — mandolin
- Tony Harrell — piano, synthesizer
- Liana Manis — harmony vocals
- Brent Mason — electric guitar
- Steve Nathan — electric organ
- Lisa Silver — harmony vocals
- Biff Watson — acoustic guitar
- Bergen White — harmony vocals
- Lee Ann Womack — lead vocals
- Glenn Worf — bass
- Curtis Young — harmony vocals

== Chart performance ==
Chart (1999)	Peak position
Canada Country Singles (RPM)	11
US Billboard Hot 100	72
US Hot Country Songs (Billboard)	12

=== Year-end charts ===
Chart (1999)	Position
Canada Country Tracks (RPM)	83
US Country Songs (Billboard)	58
