= Forever Everyday =

Single by Lee Ann Womack

from the album Something Worth Leaving Behind
- B-side: "Talk to Me"
- Released: October 14, 2002
- Genre: Country
- Length: 3:51
- Label: MCA Nashville
- Songwriter(s): Devon O'Day, Kim Patton-Johnston
- Producer(s): Mark Wright, Lee Ann Womack

Lee Ann Womack singles chronology
"Something Worth Leaving Behind" (2002)	"Forever Everyday" (2002)	"The Wrong Girl" (2004)

"Forever Everyday" is a song recorded by American country music artist Lee Ann Womack. It was released in October 2002 as the second single from the album Something Worth Leaving Behind. The song reached number 37 on the Billboard Hot Country Singles chart. The song was written by Devon O'Day and Kim Patton-Johnston.

== Charts ==
Chart (2002)	Peak position
US Hot Country Songs (Billboard)	37

== Release history ==
Release dates and format(s) for "Forever Everyday"
Region	Date	Format(s)	Label(s)	Ref.
United States	October 14, 2002	Country radio	MCA Nashville	
