= Mendocino County Line =

Single by Willie Nelson and Lee Ann Womack

from the album The Great Divide
- B-side: "Maria (Shut Up and Kiss Me)"
- Released: January 21, 2002
- Genre: Country
- Length: 4:32
- Label: Lost Highway
- Songwriters: Matt Serletic; Bernie Taupin
- Producer: Matt Serletic

Willie Nelson singles chronology
"I Never Cared For You" (1998)	"Mendocino County Line" (2002)	"Maria (Shut Up and Kiss Me)" (2002)

"Mendocino County Line" is a song written by Matt Serletic and Bernie Taupin, and recorded as a duet by American country music artists Willie Nelson and Lee Ann Womack. It was released in January 2002 as the lead-off single from Nelson's album The Great Divide. It was a Top 40 hit on the U.S. country chart, peaking at number 22. It was Nelson's first Top 40 hit on that chart since "Ain't Necessarily So" in 1990. It won the Grammy Award for Best Country Collaboration.

== Content ==
The song is a ballad about a love that couldn't last. The song references Mendocino County, California.

== Critical reception ==
Deborah Evans Price, of Billboard magazine reviewed the song favorably, saying that when Womack sings the chorus, "there's a tender, almost epic feeling to her heartache." Regarding Nelson, she states that he "imbues each line with the kind of emotional integrity that has become his trademark." She concludes her review by calling the song "absolutely magical." Mario Tarradel of The Dallas Morning News described the song and wrote, "They do sound good together; their voices complement each other like leather softened by lace."

== Music video ==
The music video was directed by Mark Seliger. It was not filmed anywhere near Mendocino County. Instead, it was filmed at Willie Nelson's Luckenbach, Texas, property.

== Chart performance ==
"Mendocino County Line" debuted at number 53 on the U.S. Billboard Hot Country Singles & Tracks for the week of January 26, 2002.

Chart (2002)	Peak position
US Hot Country Songs (Billboard)	22
US Billboard Bubbling Under Hot 100	13
