= Don't Tell Me (Lee Ann Womack song) =

Single by Lee Ann Womack

from the album Some Things I Know
- B-side: "I Keep Forgetting"
- Released: October 18, 1999
- Recorded: May 1998
- Studio: House of Gain (Nashville, Tennessee); Javelina (Nashville, Tennessee)
- Genre: Neotraditional country
- Length: 3:50
- Label: Decca Nashville
- Songwriters: Buddy Miller; Julie Miller
- Producer: Mark Wright

Lee Ann Womack singles chronology
"(Now You See Me) Now You Don't" (1999)	"Don't Tell Me" (1999)	"I Hope You Dance" (2000)

"Don't Tell Me" is a song written by Buddy Miller and Julie Miller, and performed by American country artist, Lee Ann Womack. It was released on October 18, 1999 as the fourth and final single from her album Some Things I Know. It was also her last single released by Decca Nashville before signing with MCA Records in 2000.

== Background ==
"Don't Tell Me" was composed by Buddy Miller and Julie Miller. Both composers were also credited on the album's liner notes on the background vocals for the song. However, on the single's release they were not credited. Chuck Taylor of Billboard described the song as a ballad about "dealing with lost love." The song was recorded in May 1998, during the time which Womack was recording tracks for her upcoming second studio album. Specifically, "Don't Tell Me" was cut at the House of Gain and Javelina recording studios, both of which were located in Nashville, Tennessee. The song (and Womack's second album) was produced by Mark Wright.

== Critical reception ==
"Don't Tell Me" was given a positive reception from music critics and writers. Chuck Taylor of Billboard called its production "emotionally heart-wrenching." He also compares Womack's voice positively to that of Loretta Lynn and Tammy Wynette: "For her part, Womack does justice to the strength of the song by turning in a vocal performance that aches with longing and regret. Her heart-in-throat vocals are reminiscent of the glory days of Loretta Lynn and Tammy Wynette," he stated. Meanwhile, David Cantwell of No Depression later commented that "Don't Tell Me" was filled with "emotional anguish."

== Release and chart performance ==
"Don't Tell Me" was first released as an album track on Womack's second record titled, Some Things I Know. The album was released in September 1998. In 1999, the song was spawned as the final single from the project. It was released via Decca Records. It spent eight weeks on the Billboard Hot Country Songs chart before reaching number 56 in December 1999. To date, it is Womack's lowest-charting Billboard single. It is also Womack's lowest-charting single on the Canadian RPM country chart, reaching the top 70 in 1999.

== Track listings ==
CD single

- "Don't Tell Me" – 3:50
- "I Keep Forgetting" – 3:35

== Personnel ==
Credits adapted from Some Things I Know liner notes.

- Mark Casstevens — acoustic guitar
- Chad Cromwell — drums
- Pat Flynn — acoustic guitar
- Paul Franklin — pedal steel guitar
- Larry Franklin — fiddle
- Tony Harrell — electric organ, electric piano
- Liana Manis — harmony vocals
- Brent Mason — electric guitar
- Buddy Miller — harmony vocals
- Julie Miller — harmony vocals
- Lee Ann Womack — lead vocals
- Glenn Worf — bass

== Charts ==
Chart (1999)	Peak position
Canada Country Songs (RPM)	63
US Hot Country Songs (Billboard)	56

== Release history ==
Release dates and format(s) for "Don't Tell Me"
Region	Date	Format(s)	Label(s)	Ref.
United States	October 18, 1999	Country radio	Decca Records	
