= Lee Ann Womack =

American singer (born 1966)

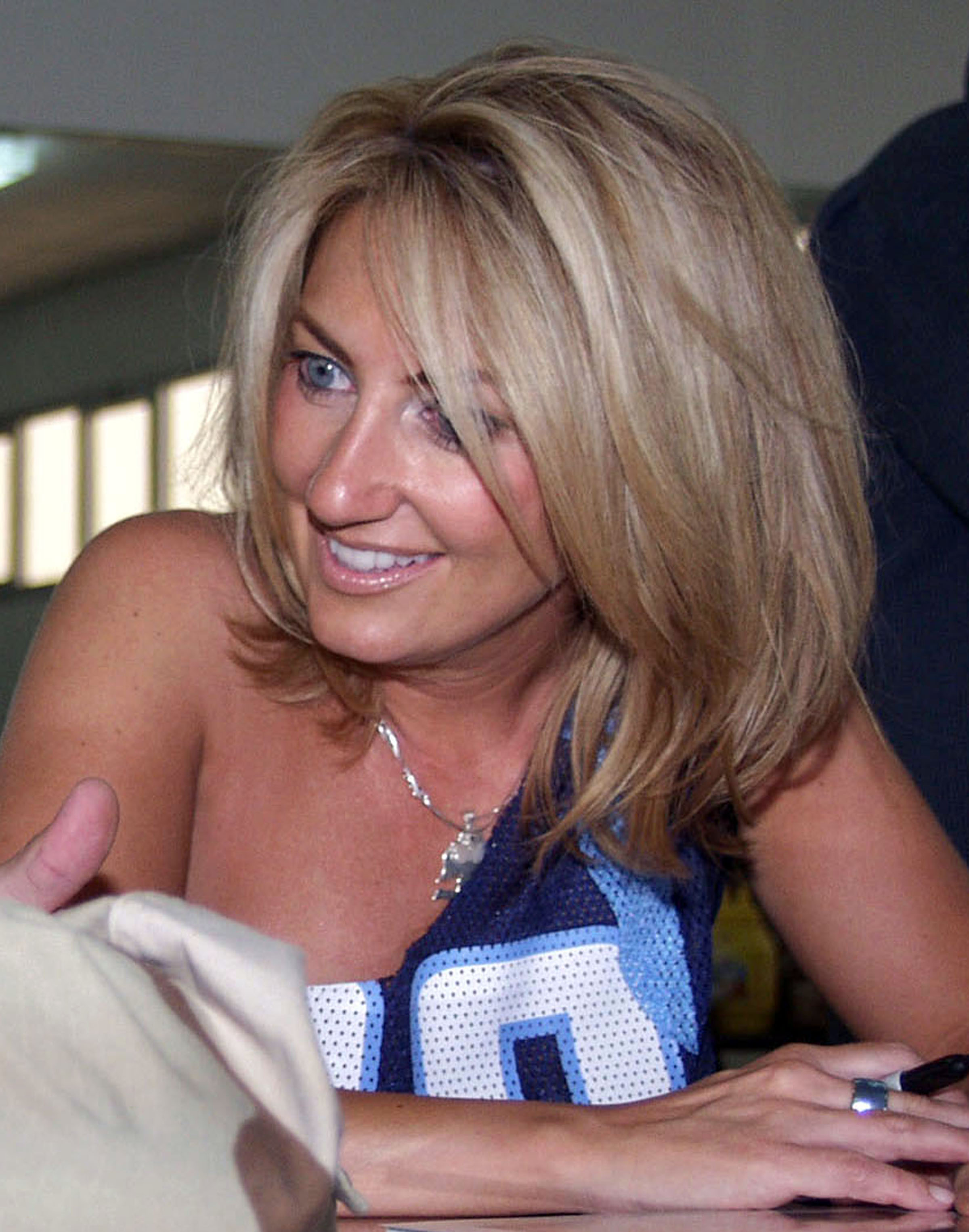
- Womack in 2003

Background information
- Born: August 19, 1966 (age 60); Jacksonville, Texas, U.S.
- Genres: Neotraditionalist country; country pop; Americana
- Occupations: Musician; singer; songwriter
- Instruments: Vocals; guitar
- Years active: 1996–present
- Labels: Decca Nashville; MCA Nashville; Mercury Nashville; Sugar Hill; ATO
- Spouses: Jason Sellers (m. 1991; div. 1996) Frank Liddell (m. 1999)
- Website: www.leeannwomack.com

Lee Ann Womack (/ˈwoʊmæk/; born August 19, 1966) is an American singer and songwriter. She has charted 23 times on the American Billboard Hot Country Songs charts; her highest peaking single there is her crossover signature song, "I Hope You Dance", a collaboration with country band Sons of the Desert which reached number one in 2000. Five of her singles made top 10 on the country music charts of the defunct RPM magazine in Canada.

Born in Jacksonville, Texas, Womack was signed by Decca Records Nashville in 1996. When she emerged as a contemporary country artist in 1997, her material drew critical comparisons to Dolly Parton and Tammy Wynette, except for the way Womack's music mixed an old-fashioned style with contemporary elements. That year, she had her first top 10 hits with "The Fool" and "You've Got to Talk to Me". After two albums with Decca, she released her first MCA Nashville album, 2000's I Hope You Dance; it had an entirely different sound, using pop music elements instead of traditional country. It was not until the release of There's More Where That Came From in 2005 that Womack returned to recording traditional country music. She recorded a total of five albums with MCA before releasing a series of independent albums, first on Sugar Hill Records and then on ATO Records; these albums include a new sound which blended country and Americana.

Four of Womack's studio albums have received a Gold certification or higher by the Recording Industry Association of America, with her most commercially successful album I Hope You Dance being certified triple-platinum in the United States and platinum in Canada. In addition, she has received five Academy of Country Music Awards, six Country Music Association Awards, and one Grammy Award. Womack is married to record producer Frank Liddell, and was previously married to songwriter and musician Jason Sellers; her daughter with the latter, Aubrie Sellers, is also a country music artist.

== Early life ==
Lee Ann Womack was born on August 19, 1966, in Jacksonville, Texas to Ann (née Gothard) and Aubrey Womack. Aubrey worked as a principal for Jacksonville Middle School and disc jockey for KEBE and KOOI, while Ann worked as a schoolteacher. Womack's older sister eventually became an attorney in Houston.

From an early age, Womack developed a passion for country music, often accompanying her father to KEBE, where she helped select records for airplay. As a child, Womack studied the piano and later graduated from Jacksonville High School in 1984. After graduating, Womack attended South Plains Junior College in Levelland, Texas. The college was one of the first in the United States to offer country music degrees, and soon she began touring as a member of the college band, Country Caravan. A year later, Womack left the college and after an agreement with her parents, she enrolled at Belmont College (now Belmont University) in Nashville, Tennessee, where she studied the commercial aspect of the music business and interned at the artists and repertoire (A&R) department of the MCA Nashville label. At the 1988 Miss Tennessee pageant in Jackson, Tennessee, Womack won the non-finalist talent award as Miss Nashville; one year later, she was the third runner-up at the Miss Texas State Railroad pageant in Tyler, Texas. In July 1990, she participated in the Miss Texas pageant in Fort Worth, Texas, as Miss Northeast Texas. It was also at this point that Womack dropped out of Belmont and married Jason Sellers.

After spending several years raising her daughter, Aubrie, Womack reentered the music industry in the mid-1990s. In 1995, she began performing her music in songwriting demos and at showcase concerts attended by talent scouts from major country music labels and publishers. One of these scouts, Pat McMakin, signed her to Sony/ATV Music Publishing's Tree International Publishing imprint after listening to "Am I the Only Thing That You've Done Wrong", a song which Womack and Sellers co-wrote; it would later be included in her debut album. (Note: Attributed to multiple references:) Womack wrote songs with some popular Nashville songwriters, including country singers Bill Anderson and Ricky Skaggs, who would later record her composition, "I Don't Remember Forgetting" for his 1997 album Life is a Journey. After divorcing Sellers around that time, Womack decided to pursue a career as a country music artist. She auditioned for MCA chairman, Bruce Hinton, who praised her talents. Shortly afterward, she accepted a contract from MCA's sister label Decca Nashville in 1996.

== Music career ==
=== Early years: 1997–1999 ===
Womack released her self-titled debut album on Decca in May 1997. This was also her first to be produced by the label's then-senior vice president and frequent songwriting collaborator Mark Wright, best known for his work with Gary Allan and Mark Chesnutt. Of the album's 11 songs, Ricky Skaggs and his wife Sharon White sang backing vocals on its lead single "Never Again, Again", while Chesnutt collaborated with Womack on the track "Make Memories with Me". "Never Again, Again" peaked at number 23 on Billboard Hot Country Songs that month. It led to the release of the album's second single, "The Fool" shortly afterward. More successful than her first single, "The Fool" peaked at number two on the country charts. It was later followed by "You've Got to Talk to Me" and "Buckaroo", respectively charting at number 2 and number 27. "The Fool" and "You've Got to Talk to Me" both made top 10 on RPM Country Tracks, then the main country music chart published in Canada. (Note: RPM ceased publication in November 2000.) Rating the album "A", Alanna Nash of Entertainment Weekly wrote that "This native of Jacksonville, Tex., has more heart than any other new female country singer, and a passel of traditional-sounding songs that may just be good enough to turn Nashville's commercial tide." Thom Owens of AllMusic thought Wright's production was "slick [and] professional" and noted that Womack "certainly has a voice that can make the mediocre sound appealing, which results in a winning debut." The album's commercial success also led to the first of several industry award nominations for Womack. The Academy of Country Music awarded her as Top New Female Vocalist. The Country Music Association nominated her for the Horizon Award between 1997 and 1998.

Womack's second and final Decca release was 1998's Some Things I Know, which was also produced by Wright. Womack co-wrote two of the album's 11 tracks. The album produced a total of four singles, three of which made the Top 40 on the Billboard country singles charts. First was "A Little Past Little Rock", one of the songs which Sellers sang backing vocals on, and then "I'll Think of a Reason Later". Both singles became the most successful singles on the album with a number two peak on the country charts. They were followed by "(Now You See Me) Now You Don't" and a cover of Buddy Miller's "Don't Tell Me". Also included on this album were collaborations with Vince Gill and Joe Diffie on "I Keep Forgetting" and a cover of George Jones' "I'd Rather Have What We Had", respectively. Some Things I Know was promoted through shows through October to November before Womack's second daughter Anna Lise Liddell was born in January 1999. That month, Womack won Favorite Country New Artist from the American Music Awards and moved to MCA Nashville Records after Decca Nashville closed its doors. Eight months later, Lee Ann Womack was certified platinum by the Recording Industry Association of America (RIAA) for shipments of one million copies; Some Things I Know was also certified gold for shipments of 500,000 copies.

=== Pop crossover success: 2000–2004 ===
Womack's first MCA studio album and third overall was 2000's I Hope You Dance which met with major success. Contributing songwriters to I Hope You Dance once again included Womack, Sellers, and Miller; another contributing writer was Lonesome River Band member Ronnie Bowman. The album produced a total of four singles, which made the Top 40 on the Billboard country singles charts. The album was led off by the single "I Hope You Dance", a collaboration with the country music band Sons of the Desert. It became the most successful single off the album with a number 1 peak on the Billboard country singles chart and a number 14 peak on the Hot 100 charts, representing Womack's and Sons of the Desert's highest peaks on those charts. It was followed by a cover of Rodney Crowell's "Ashes by Now", "Why They Call it Falling", and a cover of Miller's "Does My Ring Burn Your Finger". Also included on this album was a cover of Don Williams' "Lord, I Hope This Day Is Good". "I Hope You Dance" won the Country Music Association's "Song of the Year" and "Single of the Year" awards. I Hope You Dance also earned Womack's first Grammy Award nomination at the 43rd Annual Grammy Awards in February 2001, in the categories of Best Country Album and Best Female Country Vocal Performance. In 2002, I Hope You Dance was certified triple-platinum by the RIAA for shipments of 3 million copies. In Canada, the album was certified double-platinum by the Canadian Recording Industry Association (now Music Canada), a certification which at the time honored shipments of 200,000 copies in that country. (Note: In May 2008, Music Canada reduced the qualification for double-platinum sales from 200,000 to 160,000.)

In August 2002, MCA released Womack's fourth studio album, Something Worth Leaving Behind. It was led off by the single "Something Worth Leaving Behind", which charted at 20 on Hot Country Songs. Its follow up was "Forever Everyday", which peaked at number 37 on Hot Country Songs that year. On this album, Womack co-produced with Wright, her husband Frank Liddell, and Mike McCarthy. Writing for USA Today, Brian Mansfiled described it as the tenth worst album of 2002, saying "Womack's ill-advised crossover ploy and a makeover that made her look like Britney Spears' mother made one of Nashville's most respected singers the butt of jokes." David Cantwell of No Depression said "The results, no matter which side of the pop-twang divide you're on, will likely be very disappointing." Conversely, Stephen Thomas Erlewine of AllMusic thought the album "was a sure fit for Womack to move into the country mainstream for good." Thom Jurek, also of AllMusic, said in a retrospective review that the album "cemented Womack's place in the country music pantheon by pushing her own boundaries as an artist further than ever before." Womack told Mario Tarradell of The Dallas Morning News in 2005, "I tried...to please everybody with that record...myself, radio, the listeners, everybody who loved 'Never Again, Again' and everybody who loved 'I Hope You Dance.' And it just didn't work. It backfired." That September, Womack contributed to the theme song for the PBS animated TV series adaptation of The Berenstain Bears. One month later, she released her first Christmas album, The Season for Romance; among this album's new songs were the title track and "Forever Christmas Eve". She also collaborated with Willie Nelson on his single, "Mendocino County Line," which peaked at 22 on Hot Country Songs. The single won a Grammy and Country Music award that year. In early 2003, she played Haylie Adams in a guest appearance on the CBS television series The District.

In 2004, Womack performed "I Hope You Dance" at the Republican National Convention, in which George W. Bush was nominated for his second term as President of the United States. The other performers that night included Sara Evans and Larry Gatlin. She also collaborated with Red Dirt Music band Cross Canadian Ragweed on their hit "Sick and Tired" in 2004. Also that year, she released her first Greatest Hits compilation, which included two new songs; "The Wrong Girl" and "Time for Me to Go", the former released as a single. The Greatest Hits album was also certified gold by the RIAA in December 2008.

=== There's More Where That Came From and hiatus: 2005–2012 ===
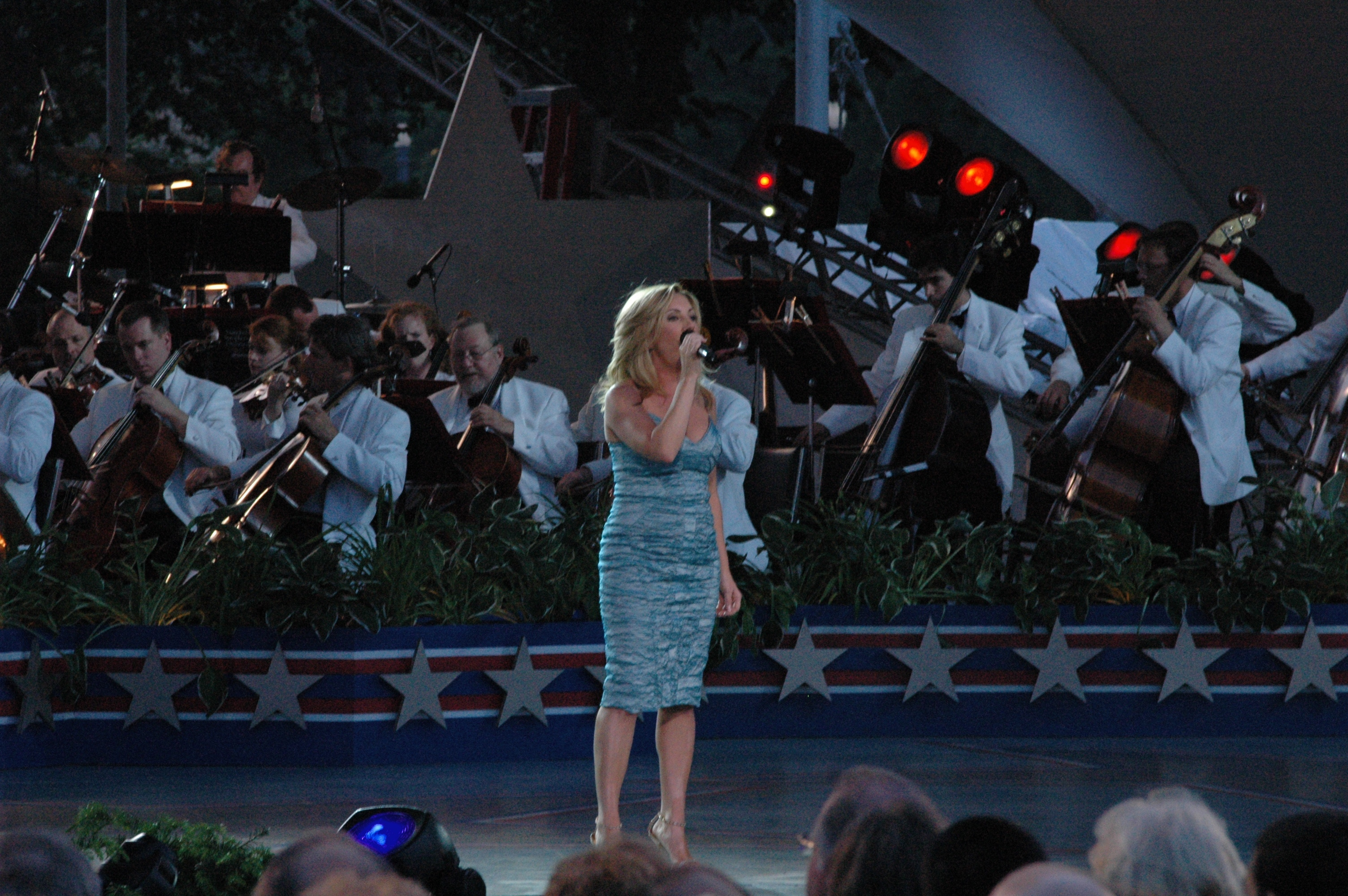
Womack at the 2006 National Memorial Day Concert in Washington, DC.

In 2005, she released her fifth studio album aimed at traditional country music entitled There's More Where That Came From. Many people in the music industry called the album, "a return to tradition," featuring songs about drinking and cheating with a distinctive older country twang, mixing strings and steel guitar. The album won the Country Music Association's "Album of the Year" award in 2005. Erlewine praised the album's production and songs, comparing it to those released by Loretta Lynn, Barbara Mandrell, and Dolly Parton in the 1970s. He would later say it was "not only the best album that Lee Ann Womack has yet made, but one that does suggest that there is indeed more where this came from." The lead single, "I May Hate Myself in the Morning" was a Top 10 hit in 2005, and also won "Single of the Year" by the CMA later that year. Two additional singles were released from the album in 2005 that became minor hits: "He Oughta Know That by Now" and "Twenty Years and Two Husbands Ago", the latter co-written by Womack. Also included on the album are covers of Reba McEntire's "Waiting for the Sun to Shine" and George Jones' "Just Someone I Used to Know". The album was released on vinyl LP as well as CD.

Womack has also appeared on specials on Country Music Television (CMT), including their "100 Greatest Duets", which featured Womack singing a collaboration with Kenny Rogers on a cover of Rogers and Dottie West's 1978 single "Every Time Two Fools Collide". Womack replaced West during that show because of West's fatal car accident in September 1991. Womack's other honors includes being listed at No. 17 on CMT's 2002 special of their countdown of the 40 Greatest Women of Country Music.

In 2006, Womack announced plans to release her next studio album on Mercury Nashville Records. The lead single "Finding My Way Back Home", her only work for Mercury, was released in the late summer of that year. It reached a peak of No. 37 on Hot Country Songs. The album was rescheduled into 2007, because Womack found more songs that she wanted to record, however it was never released and Womack left Mercury in favor of MCA. Also in 2007, Womack collaborated with Joe Nichols on "If I Could Only Fly" from his album Real Things and recorded Steve Dorff's "Love Will Still Be There" for the soundtrack of the film September Dawn.

Womack's sixth studio album and last for MCA, Call Me Crazy, was released on October 21, 2008. The album, released on vinyl and CD, produced by Tony Brown; it has been described as a dark album with plenty of songs about drinking and losing love. Womack co-wrote four of the album's 12 songs. Call Me Crazy charted only two singles in the United States: "Last Call" and "Solitary Thinkin'", which reached top 40 on Hot Country Songs. Also included on the album were covers of Jim Lauderdale's "The King of Broken Hearts" and Ashley Gearing's "I Found It in You", as well as a collaboration with George Strait on "Everything But Quits", one of the songs which Womack co-wrote. One track, "The Bees," features backing vocals from Keith Urban. At the 51st Annual Grammy Awards in 2009, "Last Call" was nominated for Best Female Country Vocal Performance; one year later, Call Me Crazy was also nominated for Best Country Album, with "Everything But Quits" and "Solitary Thinkin'" being Womack's final nominations for Best Country Collaboration with Vocals and Best Female Country Vocal Performance, respectively.

In October 2009, Womack released a cover of Trent Willmon's "There Is a God", as the lead-off single to her then-upcoming seventh studio album which never surfaced. The song peaked at number 32 on Hot Country Songs in early 2010. Womack has revealed a few of the songs she had recorded for the album, including "Talking Behind Your Back", as well as "You Do Until You Don't".

In October 2010, Womack recorded "Liars Lie" for the soundtrack of the film Country Strong. Womack also collaborated with Alan Jackson on a cover of Johnny Cash's "Ring of Fire", which was released that December as a single from his compilation album, 34 Number Ones. His version of the song was a minor hit, charting to number 45 on Hot Country Songs. Though Womack is featured on the song, she was not given credit on the charts.

In August 2012, Womack announced her departure from MCA Nashville.

=== Americana transition and return to music: 2014–present ===
In April 2014, Womack signed with Sugar Hill Records, an imprint of Rounder Records. Her first album for the label, The Way I'm Livin', was released September 23, 2014. Half of this album consists of cover songs including The Wrights' "The Way I'm Livin'", Hayes Carll's "Chances Are", Julie Miller's "Don't Listen to the Wind", Neil Young's "Out on the Weekend", Bruce Robison's "Not Forgotten You" and Kenny Price's "Tomorrow Night in Baltimore". Rating the album four out of four stars, Mansfield compared the album to "Dolly Parton's finest". He also said that "Her run-ins with the devil may seem uncomfortably specific, but the swelling steel guitars carry her as if on angels' wings." Erlewine said that the album "plays like a classic album: it's a record where the sum is greater than the individual parts".

Her second album for Sugar Hill, a vinyl extended play album of cover songs called Trouble in Mind, was released in 2015. At the 57th Annual Grammy Awards that year, The Way I'm Livin' was nominated for Best Country Album; one year later, "Chances Are" was also nominated for Best Country Solo Performance. Womack also received two Americana Music Awards nominations for Album of the Year and Artist of the Year and her first CMA Female Vocalist of the Year nomination in ten years.

In September 2014, Womack collaborated with American R&B singer John Legend for an episode of CMT Crossroads. Ahead of her 2015 tour in support of The Way I'm Livin', Womack appeared at the C2C: Country to Country festival in the UK.

On August 15, 2017, Womack announced her new album The Lonely, the Lonesome & the Gone, which was released on October 27 through ATO Records. The project included 14 songs that were recorded largely at SugarHill Recording Studios in Houston, Texas. Womack co-wrote six of the album's songs including the singles "All the Trouble", "Sunday" and "Hollywood"; the album also included covers of the 1961 Harlan Howard standard "He Called Me Baby", Lefty Frizzell's "Long Black Veil", Brent Cobb's "Shine On Rainy Day" and George Jones' "Take the Devil Out of Me". Jurek said that the album "provides listeners an exceptionally well-rounded portrait of both the mature writer and the iconic singer. What Womack delivers has little to do with Nashville -- a plus -- in favor of polished yet hardcore Texas Americana." The Lonely, the Lonesome & the Gone and "All the Trouble" received Grammy Award nominations for Best Americana Album and Best American Roots Song, respectively, in 2019.

== Personal life ==
At Belmont, Womack met and married country singer-songwriter Jason Sellers in 1990; they divorced in 1996 during the production of Lee Ann Womack. Together they had a daughter named Aubrie Sellers (b. February 1991). In January 1999, Womack had a second daughter, and first child with record producer Frank Liddell; they married later that year on November 6, 1999.

== Discography ==
Studio albums

- Lee Ann Womack (1997)
- Some Things I Know (1998)
- I Hope You Dance (2000)
- Something Worth Leaving Behind (2002)
- The Season for Romance (2002)
- There's More Where That Came From (2005)
- Call Me Crazy (2008)
- The Way I'm Livin' (2014)
- The Lonely, the Lonesome & the Gone (2017)

== Awards ==
List of awards and nominations received by Lee Ann Womack, sorted by year

Year	Association	Category	Nominated work	Result
1997	Country Music Association	Horizon Award	—N/a	Nominated
1998	Academy of Country Music	Top New Female Vocalist	—N/a	Won
1998	Academy of Country Music	Song of the Year	"The Fool"	Nominated
1998	Country Music Association	Horizon Award	—N/a	Nominated
1998	Country Music Association	Female Vocalist of the Year	—N/a	Nominated
1998	TNN/Music City News Country Awards	Star of Tomorrow – Female Artist	—N/a	Won
1998	American Music Awards	Favorite Country New Artist	—N/a	Won
1999	Grammy Awards	Best Female Country Vocal Performance	"A Little Past Little Rock"	Nominated
2000	Country Music Association	Single of the Year	"I Hope You Dance"	Won
2000	Country Music Association	Music Video of the Year	"I Hope You Dance"	Nominated
2000	Country Music Association	Vocal Event of the Year (with Sons of the Desert (band))	"I Hope You Dance"	Nominated
2000	Country Music Association	Female Vocalist of the Year	—N/a	Nominated
2000	Country Music Association	Album of the Year	I Hope You Dance	Nominated
2001	Grammy Awards	Best Country Album	I Hope You Dance	Nominated
2001	Grammy Awards	Best Female Country Vocal Performance	"I Hope You Dance"	Nominated
2001	Academy of Country Music	Top Female Vocalist	—N/a	Nominated
2001	Academy of Country Music	Album of the Year	I Hope You Dance	Nominated
2001	Academy of Country Music	Single Record of the Year	"I Hope You Dance"	Won
2001	Academy of Country Music	Song of the Year	"I Hope You Dance"	Won
2001	Academy of Country Music	Video of the Year	"I Hope You Dance"	Nominated
2001	Academy of Country Music	Vocal Event of the Year (with Sons of the Desert (band))	"I Hope You Dance"	Won
2001	Country Music Association	Female Vocalist of the Year	—N/a	Won
2001	Country Music Association	Music Video of the Year	—N/a	Nominated
2001	Billboard Music Awards	Adult Contemporary Song of the Year	"I Hope You Dance"	Won
2002	Academy of Country Music	Top Female Vocalist	—N/a	Nominated
2002	Country Music Association	Female Vocalist of the Year	—N/a	Nominated
2002	Country Music Association	Musical Event of the Year (with Willie Nelson)	"Mendocino County Line"	Won
2003	American Music Awards	Favorite Country Female Artist	—N/a	Nominated
2003	Grammy Awards	Best Country Collaboration with Vocals (with Willie Nelson)	"Mendocino County Line"	Won
2003	Grammy Awards	Best Female Country Vocal Performance	"Something Worth Leaving Behind"	Nominated
2003	Academy of Country Music	Vocal Event of the Year (with Willie Nelson)	"Mendocino County Line"	Won
2003	Academy of Country Music	Top Female Vocalist	—N/a	Nominated
2005	Academy of Country Music	Top Female Vocalist	—N/a	Nominated
2005	Academy of Country Music	Single Record of the Year	"I May Hate Myself in the Morning"	Nominated
2005	Academy of Country Music	Song of the Year	"I May Hate Myself in the Morning"	Nominated
2005	Country Music Association	Female Vocalist of the Year	—N/a	Nominated
2005	Country Music Association	Musical Event of the Year (with Willie Nelson)	"I'll Never Be Free"	Nominated
2005	Country Music Association	Single of the Year	"I May Hate Myself in the Morning"	Won
2005	Country Music Association	Music Video of the Year	"I May Hate Myself in the Morning"	Nominated
2005	Country Music Association	Album of the Year	There's More Where That Came From	Won
2005	Country Music Association	Musical Event of the Year (with George Strait)	"Good News, Bad News"	Won
2006	Grammy Awards	Best Female Country Vocal Performance	"I May Hate Myself in the Morning"	Nominated
2006	Academy of Country Music	Album of the Year	There's More Where That Came From	Nominated
2006	Academy of Country Music	Top Female Vocalist	—N/a	Nominated
2006	Academy of Country Music	Video of the Year	"I May Hate Myself in the Morning"	Nominated
2009	Grammy Awards	Best Female Country Vocal Performance	"Last Call"	Nominated
2009	Academy of Country Music	Top Female Vocalist	—N/a	Nominated
2009	Country Music Association	Musical Event of the Year (with George Strait)	"Everything But Quits"	Nominated
2010	Grammy Awards	Best Country Album	Call Me Crazy	Nominated
2010	Grammy Awards	Best Country Collaboration with Vocals (with George Strait)	"Everything But Quits"	Nominated
2010	Grammy Awards	Best Female Country Vocal Performance	"Solitary Thinkin'"	Nominated
2010	Academy of Country Music	Top Female Vocalist of the Year	—N/a	Nominated
2010	Country Music Association	Musical Event of the Year (with Alan Jackson)	"Till The End"	Nominated
2011	Academy of Country Music	Female Vocalist of the Year	—N/a	Nominated
2015	Grammy Awards	Best Country Album	The Way I'm Livin'	Nominated
2015	CMT Music Awards	Female Video of the Year	"The Way I'm Livin'"	Nominated
2015	Country Music Association	Female Vocalist of the Year	—N/a	Nominated
2015	Americana Music Honors & Awards	Album of the Year	The Way I'm Livin'	Nominated
2015	Americana Music Honors & Awards	Artist of the Year	—N/a	Nominated
2016	Grammy Awards	Best Country Solo Performance	"Chances Are"	Nominated
2018	CMT Music Awards	Performance of the Year	"Stand Up for Something"	Nominated
2018	Americana Music Honors & Awards	Song of the Year (with Waylon Payne and Adam Wright)	"All The Trouble"	Nominated
2018	ASCAP Awards	Golden Note Award	—N/a	Won
2019	Grammy Awards	Best Americana Album	The Lonely, the Lonesome & the Gone	Nominated
2019	Grammy Awards	Best American Roots Song	"All the Trouble"	Nominated

== Filmography ==
=== Television ===
Year	Title	Role	Notes
2000	CMT Showcase	Herself	
2003	The District	Haylie Adams	Episode: "Back in the Saddle"
2014	CMT Crossroads	Herself	Performed with John Legend
2016	Greatest Hits	Herself	Performed with Rachel Platten

=== Films ===
Year	Title	Role	Notes
2000	Tom Sawyer	Becky Thatcher	Direct-to-video, singing voice
2007	Sesame Street: Kids' Favorite Country Songs	Herself	Direct-to-video
2008	Noble Things	Claire Wades	
2015	I Hope You Dance: The Power and Spirit of Song	Herself	Documentary
