= A Little Past Little Rock =

Single by Lee Ann Womack

from the album Some Things I Know
- B-side: "If You're Ever Down in Dallas"
- Released: June 22, 1998
- Studio: Javelina (Nashville, Tennessee)
- Genre: Country
- Length: 4:16
- Label: Decca Nashville
- Songwriters: Jess Brown, Brett Jones, Tony Lane
- Producer: Mark Wright

Lee Ann Womack singles chronology
"Buckaroo" (1998)	"A Little Past Little Rock" (1998)	"I'll Think of a Reason Later" (1998)

Music video
- "A Little Past Little Rock" at CMT.com

"A Little Past Little Rock" is a song written by Brett Jones, Tony Lane and Jess Brown, and recorded by American country music artist Lee Ann Womack. It was released in June 1998 as the first single from her album Some Things I Know. The song peaked at number 2 on the U.S. Billboard Hot Country Singles & Tracks chart.

== Content ==
"A Little Past Little Rock" is a mid-tempo ballad, backed by percussion with harmonica and fiddle. The narrator describes driving down a highway not caring where it takes her, but she is satisfied knowing she's headed away from her troubled relationship. The song features a backing vocal from Womack's ex-husband, Jason Sellers.

== Music video ==
A music video was released for the song, directed by Thom Oliphant. In the video, Womack is shown driving down the highway in a Jeep at night. The entire video is done in black and white.

== Critical reception ==
Editors at Billboard gave the song a positive review and wrote, "Womack continues her career ascent with another solid country single. The song is laced with fiddle and sensuous lead guitar work. Wright's production is textured and keenly complements Womack's lump-in-the-throat vocals. The song is well-crafted, and Womack delivers an emotion-laden vocal performance that's sure to win even more friends at country radio. Womack sets the standard for country female vocalists in the '90s with this winning little confection."

== Personnel ==
Credits adapted from Some Things I Know liner notes.

- Mark Casstevens — acoustic guitar
- Lisa Cochran — harmony vocals
- Chad Cromwell — drums
- Pat Flynn — acoustic guitar
- Paul Franklin — pedal steel guitar
- Larry Franklin — fiddle, mandolin
- Carl Gorodetzky — string section conductor
- Tony Harrell — piano, synthesizer
- Kirk "Jelly Roll" Johnson — harmonica
- Brent Mason — electric guitar
- Tom Roady — percussion
- Jason Sellers — harmony vocals
- Lisa Silver — harmony vocals
- Bergen White — string section arrangements, harmony vocals
- Lee Ann Womack — lead vocals
- Glenn Worf — bass
- Nashville String Machine — string section

== Chart performance ==
Chart (1998)	Peak position
Canada Country Singles (RPM)	3
US Billboard Hot 100	43
US Hot Country Songs (Billboard)	2

=== Year-end charts ===
Chart (1998)	Position
Canada Country Tracks (RPM)	32
US Country Songs (Billboard)	59
