= I'll Think of a Reason Later =

"I'll Think Of A Reason Later"

Single by Lee Ann Womack

from the album Some Things I Know
- B-side: "I'd Rather Have What He Had"
- Released: January 4, 1999
- Genre: Country
- Length: 3:37
- Label: Decca
- Songwriters: Tony Martin; Tim Nichols
- Producer: Mark Wright

Lee Ann Womack singles chronology
| "A Little Past Little Rock" (1998) | "I'll Think Of A Reason Later" (1999) | "(Now You See Me) Now You Don't" (1999) |

Music video
- "I'll Think of a Reason Later" on YouTube

"I'll Think of a Reason Later" is a song by American country music artist Lee Ann Womack, released on January 4, 1999, as the second single from her sophomore studio album Some Things I Know (1998). The song was written by Tony Martin and Tim Nichols, while Mark Wright produced the song. It hit number two on the US Hot Country Songs chart behind Kenny Chesney's "How Forever Feels" while topping the Canada RPM Country Tracks and the Radio & Records country airplay charts. The song did particularly well despite lacking a music video.

== Content ==
The song is an up-tempo in the key of E-flat major, beginning with pedal steel guitar and electric guitar. The narrator, in the first verse, has just found out that her ex-boyfriend is about to be married to another woman. Upon discovering the wedding announcement in a paper, she expresses her dissatisfaction with the ex-boyfriend's lover.

The narrator then elaborates on her frustration in the second verse, defacing the woman's picture with a marker and saying that although she "couldn't be happier on [her] own", she is still jealous.

== Critical reception ==
Editors at Billboard gave the song a positive review and wrote, "This feisty little number portrays a woman spurned, but it's more mischievous than mournful. Tony Martin and Tim Nichols have penned a cute, clever lyric. It's totally country, and one of the strengths of the tune is its accessibility. The lyric is very conversational with many country phrasing, and Womack turns in an engaging performance, convincing as the redneck woman scorned. Country radio programmers and audiences should make this one of the earliest hits of the new year." Kevin John Coyne of Country Universe retrospectively gave the song an A rating, praising the humor and Womack's unique phrasing of specific words.

== Personnel ==
Credits adapted from Some Things I Know liner notes.

- Mike Brignardello — bass
- Mark Casstevens — acoustic guitar
- Lisa Cochran — harmony vocals
- Pat Flynn — acoustic guitar
- Paul Franklin — pedal steel guitar
- Larry Franklin — fiddle
- Tony Harrell — piano, synthesizer
- Liana Manis — harmony vocals
- Brent Mason — electric guitar
- Steve Nathan — piano
- Lisa Silver — harmony vocals
- Biff Watson — acoustic guitar
- Bergen White — harmony vocals
- Lonnie Wilson — drums
- Lee Ann Womack — lead vocals
- Glenn Worf — bass
- Curtis Young — harmony vocals

== Charts ==
The song debuted at number 62 on the US Billboard Hot Country Songs chart dated December 26, 1998. It peaked at number 2 and spent 4 weeks there, blocked from the number 1 spot by Kenny Chesney's "How Forever Feels". It was however her first top-forty hit on the Billboard Hot 100.

| Chart (1998–1999) | Peak position |
|---|---|
| Canada Country Singles (RPM) | 1 |
| US Billboard Hot 100 | 38 |
| US Hot Country Songs (Billboard) | 2 |
| US Radio Songs (Billboard) | 22 |
| US Country Top 50 (Radio & Records) | 1 |
| US GavinCountry (Gavin Report) | 1 |

=== Year-end charts ===
| Chart (1999) | Position |
|---|---|
| Canada Country Tracks (RPM) | 14 |
| US Country Songs (Billboard) | 20 |
| US Country (Radio & Records) | 12 |
| US GavinCountry (Gavin Report) | 17 |
