= 1998 in country music =

This is a list of notable events in country music that took place in the year 1998.

== Events ==
- January 10 — "Retro Country USA," a weekly two-hour syndicated radio program spotlighting major country hits of the 1980s (along with some from the 1970s and early 1990s), premieres. The show is initially hosted by Tampa radio personality Ken Cooper, and later "Big" Steve Kelly.
- February 25 — Johnny Cash's album, Unchained, wins a Grammy Award for Best Country Album. The album had been a critical success but was largely ignored by mainstream country radio, a fact Cash and producer Rick Rubin pick up on when they purchase a full-page advertisement in Billboard magazine. The ad, which appeared in March, featured a young Cash displaying his middle finger and sarcastically "thanking" radio for supporting the album.
- June 30 — The divorce of Vince and Janis Gill (of Sweethearts of the Rodeo) is finalized.
- December — The John F. Kennedy Center for the Performing Arts honors Willie Nelson for his lifetime contributions to the arts. Nelson is the first primarily country performer so honored.

== Top hits of the year ==
=== Singles released by American artists ===
US	CAN	Single	Artist	Reference
16	7	Absence of the Heart	Deana Carter	
4	6	Angel in My Eyes	John Michael Montgomery	
2	3	Between the Devil and Me	Alan Jackson	
1	17	A Broken Wing	Martina McBride	
26	14	Burnin' the Roadhouse Down	Steve Wariner (duet with Garth Brooks)	
1	1	Bye Bye	Jo Dee Messina	
11	17	A Chance	Kenny Chesney	
14	12	Come Some Rainy Day	Wynonna	
4	4	Commitment	LeAnn Rimes	
3	2	Cover You in Kisses	John Michael Montgomery	
5	9	The Day That She Left Tulsa (In a Chevy)	Wade Hayes	
2	2	Don't Laugh at Me	Mark Wills	
5	3	Dream Walkin'	Toby Keith	
2	3	Everything's Changed	Lonestar	
4	4	Forever Love	Reba McEntire	
18	22	Getcha Some	Toby Keith	
2	4	Happy Girl	Martina McBride	
2	3	He's Got You	Brooks & Dunn	
20	20	High on Love	Patty Loveless	
9	4	The Hole	Randy Travis	
2	2	Holes in the Floor of Heaven	Steve Wariner	
1	1	How Long Gone	Brooks & Dunn	
18	14	A House with No Curtains	Alan Jackson	
2	9	How Do You Fall in Love	Alabama	
13	30	How Do You Sleep at Night	Wade Hayes	
1	2	Husbands and Wives	Brooks & Dunn	
7	3	I Can Love You Better	Dixie Chicks	
1	2	I Can Still Feel You	Collin Raye	
2	3	I Do (Cherish You)	Mark Wills	
1	1	I Just Want to Dance with You	George Strait	
18	8	I Might Even Quit Lovin' You	Mark Chesnutt	
12	7	I Said a Prayer	Pam Tillis	
3	1	I Wanna Fall in Love	Lila McCann	
9	28	I Wanna Feel That Way Again	Tracy Byrd	
20	31	I Wanna Remember This	Linda Davis	
3	2	I'll Go On Loving You	Alan Jackson	
1	1	I'm Alright	Jo Dee Messina	
3	1	I'm from the Country	Tracy Byrd	
2	4	I'm So Happy I Can't Stop Crying	Toby Keith with Sting	
3	10	If I Never Stop Loving You	David Kersh	
22	15	If You Can't Be Good (Be Good at It)	Neal McCoy	
5	1	If You Ever Have Forever in Mind	Vince Gill	
1	1	If You See Him/If You See Her	Reba McEntire featuring Brooks & Dunn	
4	4	Imagine That	Diamond Rio	
1	10	It Must Be Love	Ty Herndon	
7	23	It Would Be You	Gary Allan	
9	5	It's Your Song	Garth Brooks	
12	9	Just Between You and Me	The Kinleys	
3	4	Just to Hear You Say That You Love Me	Faith Hill (with Tim McGraw)	
1	1	Just to See You Smile	Tim McGraw	
1	1	Let Me Let Go	Faith Hill	
2	3	A Little Past Little Rock	Lee Ann Womack	
3	1	Little Red Rodeo	Collin Raye	
11	10	Lonely Won't Leave Me Alone	Trace Adkins	
12	6	Loosen Up My Strings	Clint Black	
2	3	Love of My Life	Sammy Kershaw	
14	8	Love Working on You	John Michael Montgomery	
5	14	A Man Holdin' On (To a Woman Lettin' Go)	Ty Herndon	
1	1	Nothin' but the Taillights	Clint Black	
10	5	Nothin' New Under the Moon	LeAnn Rimes	
4	9	On the Side of Angels	LeAnn Rimes	
2	1	One of These Days	Tim McGraw	
14	12	One of Those Nights Tonight	Lorrie Morgan	
16	22	One Small Miracle	Bryan White	
2	1	Out of My Bones	Randy Travis	
1	1	Perfect Love	Trisha Yearwood	
1	1	Round About Way	George Strait	
13	23	Say When	Lonestar	
2	1	She's Gonna Make It	Garth Brooks	
21	10	She's Got That Look in Her Eyes	Alabama	
1	1	The Shoes You're Wearing	Clint Black	
33	18	Somebody to Love	Suzy Bogguss	
3	5	Someone You Used to Know	Collin Raye	
16	10	Stepping Stone	Lari White	
23	13	Still in Love with You	Travis Tritt	
4	15	Texas Size Heartache	Joe Diffie	
2	9	That's Why I'm Here	Kenny Chesney	
2	4	Then What?	Clay Walker	
2	4	There Goes My Baby	Trisha Yearwood	
1	3	There's Your Trouble	Dixie Chicks	
17	23	Things Change	Dwight Yoakam	
1	1	This Kiss	Faith Hill	
12	17	To Have You Back Again	Patty Loveless	
1	7	To Make You Feel My Love	Garth Brooks	
8	5	Too Good to Be True	Michael Peterson	
2	1	True	George Strait	
1	1	Two Piña Coladas	Garth Brooks	
9	14	Valentine	Martina McBride with special guest artist Jim Brickman	
4	2	We Really Shouldn't Be Doing This	George Strait	
23	19	What If?	Reba McEntire	
1	1	What If I Said	Anita Cochran (duet with Steve Wariner)	
1	1	Where the Green Grass Grows	Tim McGraw	
18	18	Where Your Road Leads	Trisha Yearwood (duet with Garth Brooks)	
1	1	Wide Open Spaces	Dixie Chicks	
3	1	You Move Me	Garth Brooks	
12	4	You Walked In	Lonestar	
19	12	You'll Never Know	Mindy McCready	
4	5	You're Gone	Diamond Rio	
2	2	You've Got to Talk to Me	Lee Ann Womack	

=== Singles released by Canadian artists ===
US	CAN	Single	Artist	Reference
3	1	26 Cents	The Wilkinsons	
—	5	Canadian Sunrise	Prairie Oyster	
—	20	Chevy Blue Eyes	Brent McAthey	
—	7	Cried All the Way Home	Jamie Warren	
—	3	Diamond	Julian Austin	
—	17	Do the Math	George Fox	
6	1	Don't Be Stupid (You Know I Love You)	Shania Twain	
—	15	Falling	Bruce Guthro	
73	6	Famous First Words	Gil Grand	
6	1	From This Moment On	Shania Twain (with Bryan White)	
—	10	Get Hot or Go Home	Rick Tippe	
—	13	Hard Time Loving You	Julian Austin	
—	10	Has Anybody Seen My Angel	Denise Murray	
—	9	Haven't You Heard	Shirley Myers	
1	1	Honey, I'm Home	Shania Twain	
59	19	How Do I Let Go	Lisa Brokop	
—	12	I Read Lips	Thomas Wade & Wayward	
—	6	I'm Gone	George Fox	
—	15	I'm Gonna Make Her Mine	Jason McCoy	
—	10	If I Could Just Get to You	Duane Steele	
50	1	The Kind of Heart That Breaks	Chris Cummings	
—	17	Let's Kiss and Make Up	Beverley Mahood with Ken Munshaw	
55	17	Let's Start Livin'	Gil Grand	
—	3	A Little Bit of You	Jason McCoy	
—	12	A Little Bit of Your Love	Joel Feeney	
—	9	A Minute and a Half	Chris Cummings	
—	7	Movin' On	The Rankins	
—	14	Never Givin' Up	Rick Tippe	
2	2	Now That I Found You	Terri Clark	
—	9	One Last Step	Shirley Myers	
—	3	Outside the Frame	Paul Brandt	
—	17	Radio 101	Beverley Mahood	
—	19	The River Song	Montgomery Steele	
—	20	She Made Me an Offer	Rick Tippe	
—	4	Some Days Are Better	Charlie Major	
—	12	There's a Song in There Somewhere	Thomas Wade & Wayward	
—	20	Two Out of Three Ain't Bad	Julian Austin	
—	18	Underneath the Moon	Montana Sky	
—	1	Walk This Road	Bruce Guthro	
—	10	The Way Love Goes	Jamie Warren	
—	12	What My Heart Already Knows	Julian Austin	
68	10	What's Come Over You	Paul Brandt	
—	20	What's Not to Love	Lisa Brokop	
—	19	A Whole Lot of Love	Montana Sky	
—	12	Woman's Work	Tracey Brown	
—	5	Yeah!	Paul Brandt	
—	10	You Can Trust in My Love	Charlie Major	
1	1	You're Easy on the Eyes	Terri Clark	
1	1	You're Still the One	Shania Twain	
74	15	Your Love	Jim Brickman with Michelle Wright	

== Top new album releases ==
US	CAN	Album	Artist	Record label
18		Ain't It the Truth	Daryle Singletary	Giant
21		The Apostle Soundtrack	Various Artists	Decca Nashville
9	14	Back with a Heart	Olivia Newton-John	MCA Nashville
13	12	The Best of Tracy Lawrence	Tracy Lawrence	Atlantic
22	31	Big Hopes	Ty Herndon	Epic
6		Breath of Heaven: A Christmas Collection	Vince Gill	MCA Nashville
6	15	Burnin' the Roadhouse Down	Steve Wariner	Capitol Nashville
	14	Car Wheels on a Gravel Road	Lucinda Williams	Mercury
	3	CMT Canada '99	Various Artists	BMG
	2	Country Heat 1998	Various Artists	Ariola
22		A Country Superstar Christmas	Various Artists	Hip-O
16		Did I Shave My Back for This?	Cledus T. Judd	Razor & Tie
16		Dorkfish	Bill Engvall	Warner Bros.
1	1	Double Live	Garth Brooks	Capitol Nashville
6	11	Everything's Gonna Be Alright	Deana Carter	Capitol Nashville
2	1	Faith	Faith Hill	Warner Bros.
	22	Famous First Words	Gil Grand	Monument
39	17	Farmers in a Changing World	The Tractors	Arista Nashville
2	4	For the Record	Alabama	RCA Nashville
21		Greatest Hits	Joe Diffie	Epic
9	18	Greatest Hits	Clay Walker	Giant
5		Greatest Hits Volume One	Toby Keith	Mercury Nashville
1	1	High Mileage	Alan Jackson	Arista Nashville
1	3	Hope Floats Soundtrack	Various Artists	Capitol Nashville
13	20	The Horse Whisperer Soundtrack	Various Artists	MCA Nashville
19		How Big a Boy Are Ya? Volume 4	Roy D. Mercer	Capitol Nashville
10	4	How I Feel	Terri Clark	Mercury Nashville
23		Hungry Again	Dolly Parton	Decca Nashville
5	5	I'm Alright	Jo Dee Messina	Curb
8	9	I'm from the Country	Tracy Byrd	MCA Nashville
13		If I Never Stop Loving You	David Kersh	Curb
4	7	If You See Her	Brooks & Dunn	Arista Nashville
2	7	If You See Him	Reba McEntire	MCA Nashville
37	15	It Don't Get Any Better Than This	George Jones	MCA Nashville
21		It Would Be You	Gary Allan	Decca Nashville
	3	It's Now! It's Live!	The Mavericks	MCA Nashville
1	2	The Key	Vince Gill	MCA Nashville
15	26	Leave a Mark	John Michael Montgomery	Atlantic
1	1	The Limited Series	Garth Brooks	Capitol Nashville
11	12	A Long Way Home	Dwight Yoakam	Reprise
	3	Moments and Memories: The Best of Reba	Reba McEntire	MCA Nashville
	2	New Country 5	Various Artists	Warner
15		No More Looking over My Shoulder	Travis Tritt	Warner Bros.
11	4	No Place That Far	Sara Evans	RCA Nashville
16	4	Nothing but Love	The Wilkinsons	Giant
	6	Of Your Son	Bruce Guthro	EMI
24		One Road Man	Chris LeDoux	Capitol Nashville
1	3	One Step at a Time	George Strait	MCA Nashville
8	6	The Prince of Egypt (Nashville)	Various Artists	DreamWorks Nashville
32	9	Shot Full of Love	Billy Ray Cyrus	Monument
2	2	Sittin' on Top of the World	LeAnn Rimes	Curb
25	11	The Sky's the Limit	BlackHawk	Arista Nashville
20		Some Things I Know	Lee Ann Womack	Decca Nashville
9		Step Inside This House	Lyle Lovett	MCA Nashville
18	1	Tammy Wynette Remembered	Various Artists	Asylum
17	15	Teatro	Willie Nelson	Island
3	4	Touched by an Angel: The Album	Various Artists	Epic
8	21	Totally Committed	Jeff Foxworthy	Warner Bros.
9	3	Trampoline	The Mavericks	MCA Nashville
36	18	A Tribute to Tradition	Various Artists	Columbia
12		Ultimate Country Party	Various Artists	Arista Nashville
9	2	Unbelievable	Diamond Rio	Arista Nashville
25		VH1 Storytellers	Johnny Cash & Willie Nelson	Columbia
8	13	The Walls Came Down	Collin Raye	Epic
	11	What Is This Country?	Prairie Oyster	ViK.
23		What This Country Needs	Aaron Tippin	Lyric Street
9	22	When the Wrong One Loves You Right	Wade Hayes	Columbia
	21	When You Get to Be You	Lisa Brokop	Columbia
3	2	Where Your Road Leads	Trisha Yearwood	MCA Nashville
9		White Christmas	Martina McBride	RCA Nashville
1	1	Wide Open Spaces	Dixie Chicks	Monument
47	19	Wine Into Water	T. Graham Brown	Intersound
8		Wish You Were Here	Mark Wills	Mercury Nashville
7		You and You Alone	Randy Travis	DreamWorks Nashville

=== Other top albums ===
US	CAN	Album	Artist	Record label
55		16 Biggest Hits	Merle Haggard	Epic
50		16 Biggest Hits	George Jones	Epic
29		16 Biggest Hits	Willie Nelson	Columbia
75		29 Nights	Danni Leigh	Decca Nashville
73		Beautiful Day in the Cold Cruel World	The Warren Brothers	BNA
38		The Best of John Denver	John Denver	Madacy
38		Big Backyard Beat Show	BR5-49	Arista Nashville
30		Black Dog Soundtrack	Various Artists	Decca Nashville
69		Break in the Storm	The Great Divide	Atlantic
58		The Civil War: The Nashville Sessions	Various Artists	Atlantic
71		Closing in on the Fire	Waylon Jennings	Ark 21
50		Country Christmas Classics	Various Artists	RCA Nashville
63		The Essential Alabama	Alabama	RCA Nashville
73		The Essential Lorrie Morgan	Lorrie Morgan	BNA
26		Every Time	Pam Tillis	Arista Nashville
52		Fiddle Fire: 25 Years of the CDB	Charlie Daniels	Blue Hat
66		Greatest #1 Hits	Randy Travis	Warner Bros.
36		Greatest Country Hits	John Denver	RCA
47		Greatest Hits	Restless Heart	RCA Nashville
73		Hangin' with Rodney	Rodney Carrington	Mercury Nashville
37		I Saw the Light	Hal Ketchum	Curb
69		I Turn the Page	Don Williams	Giant
70		I'm Just That Way	Mark Nesler	Asylum
61		I'm Yours	Linda Davis	DreamWorks Nashville
57		Keep on Rockin'	Confederate Railroad	Atlantic
34		Long Walk Back	Junior Brown	Curb
38		Love Is	Kevin Sharp	Asylum
66		The Lynns	The Lynns	Reprise
42		Nobody Love, Nobody Gets Hurt	Suzy Bogguss	Capitol Nashville
	27	A Paul Brandt Christmas: Shall I Play for You?	Paul Brandt	Reprise
41		Real Man	Billy Dean	Capitol Nashville
57		Rhythm and Country	Elvis Presley	RCA
36		Secret Love	Lorrie Morgan	BNA
27		Spyboy	Emmylou Harris	Eminent
50		Stepping Stone	Lari White	Lyric Street
38		The Strong One	Mila Mason	Atlantic
72		Super Hits	John Anderson	BNA
53		Super Hits	Lorrie Morgan	BNA
72		Super Hits	Aaron Tippin	RCA Nashville
59		Super Hits II	Alabama	RCA Nashville
55		Twistin' in the Wind	Joe Ely	MCA Nashville
33		What Livin's All About	Rhett Akins	Decca Nashville
56		Write It in Stone	Keith Harling	MCA Nashville

== Births ==
- October 23 – Emily Ann Roberts, 2020s singer-songwriter who originally rose to fame as a finalist in ninth season of The Voice.

== Deaths ==
- January 7 — Owen Bradley, 82, legendary record producer for top artists. (respiratory illness)
- January 17 — Cliffie Stone, 80, music executive and bassist.
- January 19 — Carl Perkins, 65, top picker and rockabilly artist. (complications from multiple strokes)
- January 24 — Justin Tubb, 62, singer-songwriter who fused honky-tonk and rockabilly in the 1950s.
- February 19 — Grandpa Jones, 84, banjo player, old-time country/gospel singer, comedian and regular on "Hee Haw" (stroke)
- February 25 — Rockin' Sidney Simien, 59, rhythm and blues, Zydeco, and soul musician best known to country audiences for his 1985 hit, "My Toot Toot." (cancer)
- April 6 — Tammy Wynette, 55, top country female vocalist of the 1960s and 1970s, best known for hits "D-I-V-O-R-C-E" and "Stand By Your Man." (blood clot)
- April 16 — Rose Maddox, 71, female honky-tonk and rockabilly pioneer who fronted the Maddox Brothers and Rose (kidney failure)
- May 7 — Eddie Rabbitt, 56, prolific songwriter and pop-country vocalist who once had 35 Top 10 hits in as many releases. (lung cancer)
- May 22 – Royce Kendall, 62, sang alongside daughter, Jeannie Kendall, of The Kendalls. (stroke)
- June 2- Helen Carter- 70, member of the Carter family
- June 10 — Steve Sanders, 45, member of the Oak Ridge Boys from 1987 to 1995; replaced and succeeded by William Lee Golden. (suicide)
- July 6 — Roy Rogers, 86, actor, singer and "King of the Cowboys." (congestive heart failure)
- July 12- Jimmy Driftwood, 91, Singer and Musician
- August 24- Jerry Clower, 71, Comedian and member of the Grand Ole Opry
- October 2 — Gene Autry, 91, actor and "The Singing Cowboy" (lymphoma).

== Hall of Fame inductees ==
=== Bluegrass Music Hall of Fame inductees ===
- Carlton Haney
- Chubby Wise

=== Country Music Hall of Fame inductees ===
- George Morgan (1924–1975)
- Elvis Presley (1935–1977)
- E.W. “Bud” Wendell (born 1927)
- Tammy Wynette (1942–1998)

=== Canadian Country Music Hall of Fame inductees ===
- Ray Griff
- Bill Anderson

== Major awards ==
=== Grammy Awards ===
- Best Female Country Vocal Performance — "You're Still the One," Shania Twain
- Best Male Country Vocal Performance — "If You Ever Have Forever in Mind", Vince Gill
- Best Country Performance by a Duo or Group with Vocal — "There's Your Trouble", Dixie Chicks
- Best Country Collaboration with Vocals — "Same Old Train", Clint Black, Joe Diffie, Merle Haggard, Emmylou Harris, Alison Krauss, Patty Loveless, Earl Scruggs, Ricky Skaggs, Marty Stuart, Pam Tillis, Randy Travis, Travis Tritt and Dwight Yoakam
- Best Country Instrumental Performance — "A Soldier's Joy" Vince Gill and Randy Scruggs
- Best Country Song — "You're Still the One", Shania Twain and Robert John "Mutt" Lange
- Best Country Album — Wide Open Spaces, Dixie Chicks
- Best Bluegrass Album — Bluegrass Rules!, Ricky Skaggs & Kentucky Thunder

=== Juno Awards ===
- Best Country Male Vocalist — Paul Brandt
- Best Country Female Vocalist — Shania Twain
- Best Country Group or Duo — Leahy

=== Academy of Country Music ===
- Entertainer of the Year — Garth Brooks
- Song of the Year — "Holes in the Floor of Heaven", Steve Wariner and Billy Kirsch
- Single of the Year — "This Kiss", Faith Hill
- Album of the Year — Wide Open Spaces, Dixie Chicks
- Top Male Vocalist — Tim McGraw
- Top Female Vocalist — Faith Hill
- Top Vocal Duo or Group — Dixie Chicks
- Top New Male Vocalist — Mark Wills
- Top New Female Vocalist — Jo Dee Messina
- Top New Vocal Duo or Group — Dixie Chicks
- Video of the Year — "This Kiss", Faith Hill (Director: Steven Goldmann)
- Vocal Event of the Year — "Just To Hear You Say That You Love Me", Faith Hill with Tim McGraw

=== ARIA Awards ===
(presented in Sydney on October 20, 1998)

- Best Country Album - My Own Sweet Time (Shanley Del)

=== Canadian Country Music Association ===
- CMT Maple Leaf Foods Fans' Choice Award — Shania Twain
- Male Artist of the Year — Paul Brandt
- Female Artist of the Year — Shania Twain
- Group or Duo of the Year — Leahy
- SOCAN Song of the Year — "Born Again in Dixieland," Jason McCoy, Naoise Sheridan, Denny Carr
- Single of the Year — "You're Still the One," Shania Twain
- Album of the Year — Come on Over, Shania Twain
- Top Selling Album — Come on Over, Shania Twain
- Video of the Year — "Don't Be Stupid (You Know I Love You)", Shania Twain
- Wrangler Rising Star Award — Bruce Guthro
- Vocal Collaboration of the Year — "Your Love", Michelle Wright and Jim Brickman

=== Country Music Association ===
- Entertainer of the Year — Garth Brooks
- Song of the Year — "Holes in the Floor of Heaven", Steve Wariner and Billy Kirsch
- Single of the Year — "Holes in the Floor of Heaven", Steve Wariner
- Album of the Year — Everywhere, Tim McGraw
- Male Vocalist of the Year — George Strait
- Female Vocalist of the Year — Trisha Yearwood
- Vocal Duo of the Year — Brooks & Dunn
- Vocal Group of the Year — Dixie Chicks
- Horizon Award — Dixie Chicks
- Music Video of the Year — "This Kiss", Faith Hill (Director: Steven Goldmann)
- Vocal Event of the Year — "You Don't Seem to Miss Me," Patty Loveless with George Jones
- Musician of the Year — Brett Mason

=== RPM Big Country Awards ===
- Canadian Country Artist of the Year — Shania Twain
- Best Country Album — Come On Over, Shania Twain
- Best Country Single — "Little Ol' Kisses", Julian Austin
- Male Artist of the Year — Paul Brandt
- Female Artist of the Year — Terri Clark
- Group of the Year — Leahy
- Outstanding New Male Artist — Bruce Guthro
- Outstanding New Female Artist — Beverley Mahood
- Outstanding New Group or Duo — Montana Sky
- Canadian Country Video — "Little Ol' Kisses", Julian Austin
- Top Country Composer(s) — Julian Austin

=== Hollywood Walk of Fame ===
Stars who were honored in 1998

Alabama, Mac Davis, and Reba McEntire

== See also ==
- Country Music Association
- Inductees of the Country Music Hall of Fame
