= Forever Loving You =

2000 song performed by Julian Austin

Single by Julian Austin

from the album Back in your Life
- Released: 2000
- Genre: Country
- Label: ViK. Recordings
- Songwriters: Julian Austin; Daniel Leblanc
- Producer: Daniel Leblanc

Julian Austin singles chronology
"Take the Money and Run" (2000)	"Forever Loving You" (2000)	"Baby Bye Bye" (2000)

"Forever Loving You" is a song recorded by Canadian country music artist Julian Austin. It was released in 2000 as the third single from his second studio album, Back in Your Life. It peaked at number 5 on the RPM Country Tracks chart in August 2000.

== Chart performance ==
Chart (2000)	Peak position
Canada Country Singles (RPM)	5
