= Radio 101 =

Radio 101 may refer to:

- Radio 101 (Croatia)
- Radio 101 (Latvia)
- Radio 101 (Malta)
- Radio 101 (Italy), owned by the Arnoldo Mondadori Editore group
- Radio 101 (United Kingdom)
- "Radio 101" (song), a song by Beverley Mahood
