= Burnin' the Roadhouse Down =

Studio album by Steve Wariner
- Released: April 21, 1998
- Recorded: 1997–1998
- Studios: Masterfonics, The Tracking Room, Big Javelina and Loud Recording (Nashville, Tennessee)
- Genre: Country
- Length: 43:50
- Label: Capitol Nashville
- Producers: Steve Wariner (tracks 1–11) Anita Cochran and Jim Ed Norman (track 12)

Steve Wariner chronology
No More Mr. Nice Guy (1996)	Burnin' the Roadhouse Down (1998)	Two Teardrops (1999)

Professional ratings
Review scores
Source	Rating
Allmusic	4/5 stars

Burnin' the Roadhouse Down is the thirteenth studio album by American country music artist Steve Wariner, released on April 21, 1998. It was the first of three albums that he recorded for Capitol Nashville after having been dropped from Arista Records' roster in 1996. It was the second album of Wariner's career to achieve RIAA gold certification for U.S. sales of 500,000 copies, and it produced four Top 40 hit singles for Wariner on the Billboard country charts.

== History ==
Despite having not charted a Top 40 country single since 1994, Steve Wariner had been finding success in the late 1990s as a songwriter, including the Number One hits "Longneck Bottle" for Garth Brooks and "Nothin' but the Taillights" for Clint Black, as well as Bryan White's Top 20 country hit "One Small Miracle". The success of the songs that he had written led to Wariner's signing with Capitol Records Nashville in late 1997. He also sang duet vocals on Anita Cochran's late 1997–early 1998 Number One hit "What If I Said". "Longneck Bottle", "Nothin' but the Taillights", "One Small Miracle", and this song were sometimes played on radio in dedicated "Steve Wariner blocks".

"What If I Said" was the second single from Cochran's debut album Back to You, released on Warner Bros. Records shortly before Burnin' the Roadhouse Down was issued. This song was not only Cochran's only Number One country hit, but also her only Top 40 country hit, and Wariner's first Number One since 1989's "I Got Dreams". This duet is also included on this album as a bonus track.

Four of Wariner's own singles were released from this album after "What If I Said" peaked, starting with the ballad "Holes in the Floor of Heaven", which peaked at number 2 on the country charts. Following it was "Road Trippin'" at number 55, the title track (a duet with Garth Brooks) at number 26, and "Every Little Whisper" at number 36. Also included on this album is a song entitled "Love Me Like You Love Me", which Clay Walker previously recorded on his 1995 album Hypnotize the Moon.

== Track listing ==
No.	Title	Writer(s)	Length
1.	"Burnin' the Roadhouse Down" (duet with Garth Brooks)	Rick Carnes, Steve Wariner	2:07
2.	"Holes in the Floor of Heaven"	Billy Kirsch, Wariner	4:47
3.	"Every Little Whisper"	Kirsch, Wariner	3:02
4.	"A Six Pack Ago"	Jim Rushing, Wariner	3:40
5.	"Road Trippin'"	Marcus Hummon, Wariner	3:32
6.	"Love Me Like You Love Me"	Bill LaBounty, Wariner	4:06
7.	"Smoke from an Old Flame""	Jim Weatherly, Wariner	3:30
8.	"I Don't Know How to Fix It"	Bill Anderson, Wariner	3:49
9.	"Big Ol' Empty House"	Mac McAnally, Wariner	3:26
10.	"Closer I Get to You"	Keith Sewell, Wariner	3:17
11.	"Big Tops"	Hummon, Wariner	3:29
12.	"What If I Said" (duet with Anita Cochran)	Anita Cochran	4:52

== Personnel ==
As listed in liner notes.

- Steve Wariner – vocals, backing vocals, acoustic guitars, electric guitars, dobro
- John Barlow Jarvis – acoustic piano, keyboards
- Bill Cuomo – synthesizers
- Steve Nathan – acoustic piano, Hammond B3 organ
- Hargus "Pig" Robbins – acoustic piano
- Brent Mason – electric guitars
- Reggie Young – electric guitars
- Buddy Emmons – steel guitar
- Paul Franklin – steel guitar
- Sonny Garrish – steel guitar
- Woody Lingle – bass guitar
- Glenn Worf – bass guitar
- Ron Gannaway – drums
- John Gardner – drums
- Paul Leim – drums
- Stuart Duncan – fiddle
- Hoot Hester – fiddle, mandolin
- Nashville String Machine – strings
- Bergen White – string arrangements
- Carl Gorodetzky – concertmaster
- Harry Stinson – backing vocals
- Trisha Yearwood – backing vocals
- Andrea Zonn – backing vocals
- Garth Brooks – vocals (1)
- Anita Cochran – vocals (12)

=== Production ===
- Steve Wariner – producer (1–11)
- Anita Cochran – producer (12)
- Jim Ed Norman – producer (12)
- Randy Gardner – recording, mixing
- Steve Crowder – recording assistant
- H.G. Hollans – recording assistant
- Julian King – additional track recording
- Rich Hanson – additional track recording assistant
- Denny Purcell – mastering at Georgetown Masters (Nashville, Tennessee)
- Don Cobb – mastering assistant
- Jonathan Russell – mastering assistant
- Caryn Wariner – production assistant
- Carlton Davis – art production
- Denise Jarvis – production assistance
- Chris Ferrera – design
- Colourworks – digital imagery
- Matthew Barnes – photography
- Lorrie Turk – make-up
- Renaissance Management – management

== Chart performance ==
=== Weekly charts ===
Chart (1998)	Peak position
Canadian Country Albums (RPM)	15
US Billboard 200	41
US Top Country Albums (Billboard)	6

=== Year-end charts ===
Chart (1998)	Position
US Top Country Albums (Billboard)	35
Chart (1999)	Position
US Top Country Albums (Billboard)	73
