= Back in Your Life (Julian Austin album) =

Studio album by Julian Austin
- Released: March 7, 2000
- Genre: Country
- Label: ViK. Recordings
- Producer: Daniel Leblanc

Julian Austin chronology
What My Heart Already Knows (1997)	Back in Your Life (2000)	Bulletproof (2002)

Back in Your Life is the second studio album by Canadian country music artist Julian Austin. It was released by ViK. Recordings on March 7, 2000. The album peaked at number 10 on the RPM Country Albums chart.

== Track listing ==
1. "Back in Your Life" (Julian Austin, Daniel Leblanc)
2. "Take the Money and Run" (Steve Miller)
3. "Real Love" (Austin, Leblanc)
4. "Forever Loving You" (Austin, Leblanc)
5. "Should Be over You" (Austin)
6. "Baby Bye Bye" (Austin, Leblanc)
7. "Cause He Ain't Here" (Austin, Leblanc)
8. "She's Through" (Austin, Stephen Robichaud)
9. "Good at Bein' Bad" (Austin, Leblanc)
10. "Better Think Twice" (Austin, Robichaud)
11. "Doesn't Take a Fool" (Austin, Leblanc)
12. "Lying to Myself" (Austin)
13. "My Reason for Living Is You" (Austin, Leblanc)
14. "Holdin' On for 8" (Austin)

== Chart performance ==
Chart (2000)	Peak position
Canadian RPM Country Albums	10
