= You've Got to Talk to Me =

Single by Lee Ann Womack

from the album Lee Ann Womack
- B-side: "A Man with 18 Wheels"
- Released: November 1, 1997
- Genre: Country
- Length: 3:38
- Label: Decca
- Songwriter: Jamie O'Hara
- Producer: Mark Wright

Lee Ann Womack singles chronology
"The Fool" (1997)	"You've Got to Talk to Me" (1997)	"Buckaroo" (1998)

"You've Got to Talk to Me" is a song written by Jamie O'Hara, and recorded by American country music singer Lee Ann Womack. It was released in November 1997 as the third and last single from her self-titled debut album.

The song spent twenty-two weeks on the Hot Country Songs charts, peaking at number 2 in early 1998, behind "What If I Said" by Anita Cochran and Steve Wariner. It also peaked at number 2 on the Canadian country singles charts published by RPM.

== Chart performance ==
Chart (1997–1998)	Peak position
Canada Country Singles (RPM)	2
US Hot Country Songs (Billboard)	2

=== Year-end charts ===
Chart (1998)	Position
US Country Songs (Billboard)	35
