= Walk This Road =

"Walk This Road" may refer to:

- "Walk This Road" (song), 1997 single by Bruce Guthro from Of Your Son
- Walk This Road (album), 2025 studio album by the Doobie Brothers

== See also ==
- We Walk This Road, 2010 album by Robert Randolph and the Family Band
