= Montana Sky (disambiguation) =

Montana Sky is a 2007 television film, based on a novel by Nora Roberts.

Montana Sky may also refer to:

- Montana Sky, the 1996 book by Nora Roberts upon which the film was based
- Montana Sky (band), a Canadian country music group
- "Montana Sky", a song by the Christian rock band White Heart from their album Emergency Broadcast (1987)
- "Montana Sky" (song), 2023, by the Jonas Brothers
- Montana Sky (basketball), a 1970s team

== See also ==
- Montana Skies, a string duo
- "Blue Montana Sky", a song by Duane Eddy, the B-side to "Play Me Like You Play Your Guitar" (1975)
