= What My Heart Already Knows =

Studio album by Julian Austin
- Released: May 6, 1997
- Genre: Country
- Length: 40:53
- Label: ViK. Recordings
- Producer: Daniel Leblanc

Julian Austin chronology
What My Heart Already Knows (1997)	Back in Your Life (2000)

What My Heart Already Knows is the debut album by Canadian country music artist Julian Austin. It was released by ViK. Recordings on May 6, 1997. The album peaked at number 9 on the RPM Country Albums chart and was certified gold by Music Canada.

== Track listing ==
1. "Little Ol' Kisses" (Julian Austin) – 2:28
2. "Hard Time Loving You" (Austin) – 4:17
3. "Two Out of Three Ain't Bad" (Jim Steinman) – 4:20
4. "Honky Tonk Lock and Key" (Austin, Stephen Robichaud) – 3:08
5. "Sad Ways of a Fool" (Austin) – 2:16
6. "What My Heart Already Knows" (Austin, Robichaud) – 3:44
7. "Diamond" (Austin, Robichaud) – 3:36
8. "Sister Ruby" (Austin, Robichaud) – 3:26
9. "Dancing with Him" (Austin, Robichaud) – 3:22
10. "Highway Song" (Austin) – 3:13
11. "When You're Gone" (Austin, Robichaud) – 2:20
12. "Leaving You Was Never Right" (Austin) – 4:43

== Chart performance ==
Chart (1997)	Peak position
Canadian RPM Country Albums	9

== Certifications ==
Region	Certification
Canada (Music Canada)	Gold
