= She's Getting Serious =

Single by Thomas Wade & Wayward

from the album Thomas Wade & Wayward
- Released: 1997
- Genre: Country
- Length: 3:15
- Label: Peg
- Songwriters: Thomas Wade; Tim Taylor
- Producers: Joey May; Thomas Wade

Thomas Wade & Wayward singles chronology
"Lying Here with You" (1997)	"She's Getting Serious" (1997)	"There's a Song in There Somewhere" (1997)

"She's Getting Serious" is a song recorded by Canadian country music group Thomas Wade & Wayward. It was released in 1997 as the fourth single from their debut album, Thomas Wade & Wayward. It peaked at number 6 on the RPM Country Tracks chart in September 1997.

== Chart performance ==
Chart (1997)	Peak position
Canada Country Singles (RPM)	6

=== Year-end charts ===
Chart (1997)	Position
Canada Country Tracks (RPM)	54
