= Hold On to Me (John Michael Montgomery song) =

Single by John Michael Montgomery

from the album Leave a Mark
- Released: September 28, 1998
- Recorded: 1998
- Genre: Country
- Length: 4:10
- Label: Atlantic
- Songwriters: Blair Daly; Will Rambeaux
- Producers: Csaba Petocz, John Michael Montgomery

John Michael Montgomery singles chronology
"Cover You in Kisses" (1998)	"Hold On to Me" (1998)	"Hello L.O.V.E." (1999)

"Hold On to Me" is a song recorded by American country music artist John Michael Montgomery. It was written by Blair Daly and Will Rambeaux, and produced by Montgomery and Csaba Petocz. It was released in September 1998 as the third and final single from his album Leave a Mark. It peaked at number four in both the United States and Canada.

== Critical reception ==
Deborah Evans Price of Billboard magazine reviewed the song favorably, saying that "there's a simple honesty in the lyric of this song." She goes on to say that the production is skilled and the emphasis is on Montgomery's "self-assured vocal performance."

== Music video ==
The music video was directed by Jim Shea and premiered in early 1999.

== Chart positions ==
"Hold On to Me" debuted at number 60 on the US Billboard Hot Country Singles & Tracks for the week of October 10, 1998. It peaked at number 33 on the Billboard Hot 100, making it Montgomery's first top 40 hit. It is his most successful single to date.

Chart (1998–1999)	Peak position
Canada Country Singles (RPM)	4
US Billboard Hot 100	33
US Hot Country Songs (Billboard)	4

=== Year-end charts ===
Chart (1999)	Position
Canada Country Tracks (RPM)	24
US Country Songs (Billboard)	30
