= Lace (group) =

Canadian musical group

- Origin: Toronto, Ontario, Canada
- Genre: Country
- Years active: 1998–2001, 2006
- Label: 143/Warner Bros. Nashville
- Past members: Giselle Brohman; Corbi Dyann; Beverley Mahood; Stacey Lee

Lace was a Canadian-American country music vocal group. They were formed in 1998 with the backing of music producer David Foster, and initially consisted of Canadian singers Beverley Mahood and Giselle Brohman, along with American singer Corbi Dyann. Active between 1998 and 2001, the band charted four singles on national country music charts, in addition to releasing a self-titled studio album on 143 Records (in association with Warner Bros. Records Nashville).

== Biography ==
Foster's plan to put together an all-female country trio began to take shape after seeing a music video of Beverley Mahood on CMT Canada while he was visiting his mother in Victoria, British Columbia; he requested to meet with Mahood, and soon after signed her to a recording contract on his label, 143 Records. Mahood later suggested her friend Giselle Brohman (also credited as just Giselle), a fellow singer-songwriter in Ontario, prior to David Foster introducing them to the group's third member, Austin, Texas native Corbi Dyann. The members were assembled in Toronto.

The trio received a Juno Award nomination in 2000 for Best Country Group or Duo. They also received nominations for Group of the Year and Video of the Year ("I Want a Man") at the 2000 Canadian Country Music Awards.

Their 1999 self-titled album includes record producing credits of Foster, Chris Farren, Humberto Gatica, and J. Richard Hutt. Songwriting credits on the album include Linda Thompson, Deana Carter, Sarah McLachlan, and John Scott Sherrill. The group's best-known song was "I Want a Man".

In 2000, Corbi Dyann left the group and Canadian Stacey Lee replaced her.

The trio often was seen as attempting to capitalize on the success of girl groups Dixie Chicks and SHeDAISY.

== Discography ==
=== Albums ===
Title	Album details	Peak positions
Title	Album details	CAN Country
Lace	Release date: October 5, 1999; Label: 143 Records	17

=== Singles ===
Year	Single	Peak positions		Album
Year	Single	CAN Country	US Country	Album
1999	"I Want a Man"	7	65	Lace
2000	"You Could've Had Me"	—	71	Lace
2000	"Kiss 'Em All"	6	—	Lace
2000	"True Love (Never Goes Out of Style)"	15	—	Lace
2000	"I Cry Real Tears"	—	—	Lace
2001	"Angel"	—	—	Lace
2006	"Can You Handle It"	48	—	—N/a
"—" denotes releases that did not chart

=== Music videos ===
Year	Video	Director
1999	"I Want a Man"	Roger Pistole
2000	"True Love (Never Goes Out of Style)"	Terrance Odette
2000	"I Cry Real Tears"	Terrance Odette

== Awards and nominations ==
Year	Association	Category	Result
2000	Juno Awards of 2000	Best Country Group or Duo	Nominated
2000	Canadian Country Music Association	Group or Duo of the Year	Nominated
2000	Canadian Country Music Association	Video of the Year – "I Want a Man"	Nominated
2001	Juno Awards of 2001	Best Country Group or Duo	Nominated
2001	Canadian Country Music Association	Group or Duo of the Year	Nominated
