= Diamond (Julian Austin song) =

Single by Julian Austin

from the album What My Heart Already Knows
- Released: 1997
- Genre: Country
- Length: 3:36
- Label: ViK. Recordings
- Songwriters: Julian Austin; Stephen Robichaud
- Producer: Daniel Leblanc

Julian Austin singles chronology
"Little Ol' Kisses" (1997)	"Diamond" (1997)	"Two Out of Three Ain't Bad" (1998)

"Diamond" is a song recorded by Canadian country music artist Julian Austin. It was released in 1997 as the second single from his debut album, What My Heart Already Knows. The 3:36 minute song peaked at number 3 on the RPM Country Tracks chart in January 1998.

== Chart performance ==
Chart (1997–1998)	Peak position
Canada Country Singles (RPM)	3

=== Year-end charts ===
Chart (1997)	Position
Canada Country Tracks (RPM)	95
