= Leave a Mark =

Studio album by John Michael Montgomery
- Released: May 5, 1998
- Studio: Ocean Way Nashville and Masterfonics (Nashville, Tennessee)
- Genre: Country
- Length: 40:01
- Label: Atlantic
- Producer: John Michael Montgomery; Csaba Petocz

John Michael Montgomery chronology
Greatest Hits (1997)	Leave a Mark (1998)	Home to You (1999)

Singles from Leave a Mark
- 1. "Love Working on You" Released: March 9, 1998; 2. "Cover You in Kisses" Released: May 25, 1998; 3. "Hold On to Me" Released: September 28, 1998

Professional ratings
Review scores
Source	Rating
Allmusic	link
Entertainment Weekly	B link

Leave a Mark is the fifth studio album by American country music artist John Michael Montgomery. The tracks "Love Working on You", "Cover You in Kisses", and "Hold On to Me" were all released as singles, reaching numbers 14, 3, and 4, respectively, on the Hot Country Songs charts. Overall, the album was certified gold by the RIAA for shipments of 500,000 copies in the United States.

The title track was later recorded by Elbert West (who co-wrote it) on his 2001 debut album Livin' the Life. "You're the Ticket" was later released by Billy Hoffman from his 2000 album All I Wanted Was You.

== Track listing ==
No.	Title	Writer(s)	Length
1.	"Cover You in Kisses"	Jerry Kilgore, Brett Jones, Jess Brown	3:56
2.	"Hold On to Me"	Blair Daly, Will Rambeaux	4:10
3.	"Little Cowboy's Cry"	Monte Thomas	4:53
4.	"It Gets Me Every Time"	Wade Kirby, Butch Baker, Thom McHugh	3:07
5.	"I Don't Want This Song to End"	Travis Ryan Lelesch, Tony Ramey	4:46
6.	"Love Working on You"	Jim Collins, Craig Wiseman	4:00
7.	"I Couldn't Dream"	Richie McDonald, Frank Solesbee, Mark Rone	4:26
8.	"You're the Ticket"	Keith Follesé, Kirby, Brown	2:54
9.	"I Never Stopped Lovin' You"	Carson Chamberlain, Gary Harrison, Mark Wills	3:59
10.	"This One's Gonna 'Leave a Mark'"	John Michael Montgomery, David Lee, Johnny Park, Elbert West	3:50

== Personnel ==
- John Michael Montgomery – vocals
- Phil Naish – keyboards, acoustic piano
- Steve Nathan – keyboards, acoustic piano
- Richard Bennett – electric guitars
- J. T. Corenflos – electric guitars
- Dann Huff – electric guitars
- Brent Mason – electric guitars
- Brent Rowan – electric guitars
- Reggie Young – electric guitars
- Michael Spriggs – acoustic guitars
- Biff Watson – acoustic guitars
- Bruce Bouton – steel guitar, dobro
- Paul Franklin – steel guitar, dobro
- Mike Brignardello – bass guitar
- Mark Beckett – drums
- Vinnie Colaiuta – drums
- Shannon Forrest – drums
- Larry Franklin – fiddle
- Tabitha Fair – backing vocals
- Gene Miller – backing vocals
- Chris Rodriguez – backing vocals
- John Wesley Ryles – backing vocals
- Curtis Young – backing vocals

=== Production ===
- John Michael Montgomery – producer
- Csaba Petocz – producer, overdub recording
- Joe Chiccharelli – track recording
- David Hall – track assistant, overdub assistant, additional engineer
- Glenn Spinner – track assistant, overdub assistant
- David Boyer – overdub assistant
- Chad Brown – overdub assistant
- Sandy Jenkins – overdub assistant
- Aaron Swihart – overdub assistant
- The Punk Legends – mixing
- Patrick Murphy – mix assistant
- John Saylor – mix assistant
- Glenn Meadows – mastering
- Mike "Frog" Griffith – production coordinator
- P. David Eleazar – art direction, design
- Nick Long – art direction, design
- Jim "Señior" McGuire – photography
- Lynne Cook – photography assistant
- R.B. Miller – photography assistant
- Gina Ketchum – make-up
- The Hallmark Direction Co. – management

== Chart performance ==
=== Weekly charts ===
Chart (1998)	Peak position
Canadian Country Albums (RPM)	26
US Billboard 200	95
US Top Country Albums (Billboard)	15

=== Year-end charts ===
Chart (1998)	Position
US Top Country Albums (Billboard)	64
Chart (1999)	Position
US Top Country Albums (Billboard)	74

== Certifications ==
Region	Certification	Certified units/sales
United States (RIAA)	Gold	500,000^{^}
^{^} Shipments figures based on certification alone.
