= What My Heart Already Knows (song) =

Single by Julian Austin

from the album What My Heart Already Knows
- Released: 1998
- Genre: Country
- Length: 3:44
- Label: ViK. Recordings
- Songwriters: Julian Austin; Stephen Robichaud
- Producer: Daniel Leblanc

Julian Austin singles chronology
"Two Out of Three Ain't Bad" (1998)	"What My Heart Already Knows" (1998)	"Hard Time Loving You" (1998)

"What My Heart Already Knows" is a song recorded by Canadian country music artist Julian Austin. It was released in 1998 as the fourth single from his debut album, What My Heart Already Knows. It peaked at number 12 on the RPM Country Tracks chart in June 1998.

== Chart performance ==
Chart (1998)	Peak position
Canada Country Singles (RPM)	12

=== Year-end charts ===
Chart (1998)	Position
Canada Country Tracks (RPM)	82
