= Hard Time Loving You =

Single by Julian Austin

from the album What My Heart Already Knows
- Released: 1998
- Genre: Country
- Length: 4:17
- Label: ViK. Recordings
- Songwriter: Julian Austin
- Producer: Daniel Leblanc

Julian Austin singles chronology
| "What My Heart Already Knows" (1998) | "Hard Time Loving You" (1998) | "Back in Your Life" (1999) |

"Hard Time Loving You" is a song recorded by Canadian country music artist Julian Austin. It was released in 1998 as the fifth single from his debut album, What My Heart Already Knows. It peaked at number 13 on the RPM Country Tracks chart in October 1998.

== Chart performance ==
| Chart (1998) | Peak position |
|---|---|
| Canada Country Singles (RPM) | 13 |

=== Year-end charts ===
| Chart (1998) | Position |
|---|---|
| Canada Country Tracks (RPM) | 79 |
