= Girl Out of the Ordinary =

1998 debut studio album by Beverley Mahood

Studio album by Beverley Mahood
- Released: 1 February 1998
- Recorded: 1997–1998
- Genre: Country
- Length: 47:45
- Label: Spin
- Producer: J. Richard Hutt

Beverley Mahood chronology
Girl Out of the Ordinary (1998)	Moody Blue (2004)

Girl Out of the Ordinary is the debut album by Canadian country music singer-songwriter Beverley Mahood, released in 1998. The title track was released in January 1997, reaching the Top 10 on several Canadian charts, while the video was on high rotation on Country Music Television. Later that year, she released the singles "A Little Thing Called Love" and "Kiss and Make Up" with Ken Munshaw.

== Track listing ==
1. "Radio 101" (Beverley Mahood, Gary O'Connor) – 3:17
2. "Girl Out of the Ordinary" (Mark Dineen, Mahood) – 4:02
3. "True Love (Never Goes Out of Style)" (Dineen, Mahood) – 4:21
4. "A Little Thing Called Love" (Ron Hiller, J. Richard Hutt, Mahood, Judy Millar) – 3:26
5. "The Way I Woman Feels" (Dineen, Hutt, Mahood) – 3:57
6. "I Believe in You" (O'Connor) – 4:20
7. "I Don't Do" (Hiller, Hutt, Mahood, Millar) – 4:08
8. "Let's Kiss and Make Up" (Dineen, Steve Hogg, Mahood) – 4:18
  - with Ken Munshaw
9. "Moving Day" (Hiller, Mahood, Millar) – 5:18
10. "Little Miss Innocent" (Hogg, Mahood) – 4:14
11. "I Love How You Listen to Me" (Hiller, Mahood, Millar) – 3:13
12. "All Through the Night" (Traditional) – 3:11
  - bonus track
