= Holes in the Floor of Heaven =

Single by Steve Wariner

from the album Burnin' the Roadhouse Down
- B-side: "The Closer I Get to You"
- Released: March 24, 1998
- Recorded: 1998
- Genre: Country
- Length: 4:47
- Label: Capitol Nashville
- Songwriters: Billy Kirsch, Steve Wariner
- Producer: Steve Wariner

Steve Wariner singles chronology
"Get Back" (1995)	"Holes in the Floor of Heaven" (1998)	"Road Trippin'" (1998)

Music video
- "Holes in the Floor of Heaven" on YouTube

"Holes in the Floor of Heaven" is a song co-written and recorded by American country music artist Steve Wariner. It was released in March 1998 as the lead-off single from his album Burnin' the Roadhouse Down, and was his first solo single in three years. It peaked at number 2 in both the United States and Canada. The song, written by Wariner with Billy Kirsch, won the award for Song of the Year in 1998 from both the Country Music Association (CMA) and the Academy of Country Music (ACM). In 2005, Steve Wariner re-recorded a new version of this song for his second studio album that he released on his own SelecTone Records titled "This Real Life". The re-recorded version was not released as a single.

== Content ==
Told in first-person, the protagonist recalls the deaths of his grandmother ("One day shy of eight years old") and his young wife, and the sadness he felt upon each passing. Each time, the man recalls how a cold rain reminds him of his beloved ancestors crying down from Heaven, wishing they could still be with him, experiencing and sharing various joys in his life ("There's holes in the floor of Heaven/and her tears are pouring down/That's how I know she's watching/wishing she could be here now").

In the case of the young man's wife (who died from pregnancy complications giving birth to their daughter), the point is driven home in the final verse of the song, which depicts his now 23-year-old daughter's wedding day. At the end of the ceremony, it begins to rain, making the father of the bride very sad; the daughter picks up on this and comforts him by saying the rain is her late mother's tears of joy.

== Critical reception ==
Thom Owens from AllMusic described the song as an "affecting ballad". Billboard wrote, "Speaking of great comebacks, Wariner is enjoying an exceptional year, having co-written recent hits for Garth Brooks and Clint Black—not to mention his own No. 1 duet with Anita Cochran on "What If I Said". After asking to be released from his Arista contract, he signed a deal with Capitol, and this is the first single from his upcoming album. Wariner is in better voice than ever, and it shows on this sweet and pretty ballad, which he co-wrote with Billy Kirsch. Here's hoping radio gives Wariner the same warm reception singing his own tune that it has been giving him as a songwriter and duet partner."

In 2019, Rolling Stone ranked "Holes in the Floor of Heaven" No. 28 on its list of the 40 Saddest Country Songs of All Time.

== Music video ==
The music video was directed by Michael Salomon. It shows the singer in a living room, while shadows portray the song's storyline. Wariner is sitting the whole time. In the end, "Holes in the floor of heaven" appear, each one giving off a blue light.

== Chart performance ==
Chart (1998)	Peak position
Canada Country Singles (RPM)	2
US Hot Country Songs (Billboard)	2

=== Year-end charts ===
Chart (1998)	Position
Canada Country Tracks (RPM)	54
US Country Songs (Billboard)	23
