= I Want a Man =

Single by Lace

from the album Lace
- B-side: "Swept Away"
- Released: August 17, 1999
- Genre: Country
- Length: 4:16
- Label: 143 Records
- Songwriters: Rick Giles; Tim Nichols; Gilles Godard
- Producer: David Foster

Lace singles chronology
"I Want a Man" (1999)	"You Could've Had Me" (2000)

"I Want a Man" is a song recorded by Canadian country music group Lace. It was released in August 1999 as the first single from their debut album, Lace. It peaked at number 7 on the RPM Country Tracks chart in November 1999.

== Chart performance ==
Chart (1999)	Peak position
Canada Country Singles (RPM)	7
US Hot Country Songs (Billboard)	65

=== Year-end charts ===
Chart (1999)	Position
Canada Country Tracks (RPM)	60
