= Kiss 'Em All =

Single by Lace

from the album Lace
- Released: 2000
- Genre: Country
- Length: 3:24
- Label: 143 Records
- Songwriters: Bob Regan; Jeff Pennig
- Producer: David Foster

Lace singles chronology
"You Could've Had Me" (2000)	"Kiss 'Em All" (2000)	"True Love (Never Goes Out of Style)" (2000)

"Kiss 'Em All" is a song recorded by Canadian country music group Lace. It was released in 2000 as the third single from their debut album, Lace. It peaked at number 6 on the RPM Country Tracks chart in May 2000.

== Chart performance ==
Chart (2000)	Peak position
Canada Country Singles (RPM)	6
