= Zero to Sixty (song) =

Single by Thomas Wade & Wayward

from the album Thomas Wade & Wayward
- Released: 1996
- Genre: Country
- Length: 3:32
- Label: JMR
- Songwriters: Thomas Wade; Cyril Rawson
- Producers: Joey May; Thomas Wade

Thomas Wade & Wayward singles chronology
| "Sittin' Pretty" (1996) | "Zero to Sixty" (1996) | "Lying Here with You" (1997) |

"Zero to Sixty" is a song recorded by Canadian country group Thomas Wade & Wayward. It was released in 1996 as the second single from their debut album, Thomas Wade & Wayward. It peaked at number 8 on the RPM Country Tracks chart in November 1996.

== Chart performance ==
| Chart (1996) | Peak position |
|---|---|
| Canada Country Singles (RPM) | 8 |
