= Lace (album) =

Studio album by Lace
- Released: October 5, 1999
- Genre: Country
- Length: 47:27
- Label: 143 Records
- Producers: David Foster; Humberto Gatica; Chris Farren; J. Richard Hutt

Lace is the studio album by Canadian country music group Lace. The album was released on October 5, 1999, on 143 Records. The release led to the band receiving nominations for Group of the Year and Video of the Year (for "I Want a Man") at the 2000 Canadian Country Music Awards.

== Track listing ==
1. "I Want a Man" (Rick Giles, Tim Nichols, Gilles Godard) – 4:16
2. "Life Is Good" (Deana Carter) – 3:59
3. "Angel" (Sarah McLachlan) – 4:23
4. "I Cry Real Tears" (Reed Vertelney, Linda Thompson-Jenner) – 4:25
5. "Kiss 'Em All" (Bob Regan, Jeff Pennig) – 3:24
6. "You Could've Had Me" (Stephanie Bentley, Eric Silver) – 3:46
7. "Texas Ranger" (Gary O'Connor) – 3:17
8. "He Can't Talk Without His Hand" (Giselle Brohman) – 4:55
9. "So Gone" (Taylor Rhodes, Christopher Ward, Beth Hart) – 3:10
10. "Swept Away" (John Scott Sherrill, Cathy Majeski) – 4:14
11. "True Love (Never Goes Out of Style)" (Mark Dineen) – 3:49
12. "If Not for Loving You" (Steve Diamond) – 3:49

== Personnel ==
=== Lace ===
- Corbi Dyann - vocals
- Giselle - vocals
- Beverley Mahood - vocals

=== Additional Musicians ===
- Joe Chemay - bass guitar
- Nathan East - bass guitar
- Chris Farren - mandolin
- Annalee Fery - background vocals
- Pat Flynn - acoustic guitar
- David Foster - keyboards
- Larry Franklin - fiddle
- Paul Franklin - steel guitar
- John Hobbs - piano
- David Hungate - bass guitar
- Jeff King - electric guitar
- Paul Leim - drums
- Greg Morrow - drums
- Dean Parks - electric guitar
- Matt Rollings - piano
- Brent Rowan - electric guitar
- Biff Watson - acoustic guitar

== Chart performance ==
Chart (1999)	Peak position
Canadian RPM Country Albums	17
