= Running Away with You =

Single by Thomas Wade

from the album Lucky 13
- Released: 1999
- Genre: Country
- Length: 3:06
- Label: Rockit Boy
- Songwriters: Thomas Wade; Tim Taylor
- Producer: Thomas Wade

Thomas Wade singles chronology
| "For Better or Worse" (1998) | "Running Away with You" (1999) | "If You Ain't Got It" (1999) |

"Running Away with You" is a song recorded by Canadian country music artist Thomas Wade. It was released in 1999 as the first single from his debut solo album, Lucky 13. It peaked at number 9 on the RPM Country Tracks chart in October 1999.

== Chart performance ==
| Chart (1999) | Peak position |
|---|---|
| Canada Country Singles (RPM) | 9 |

=== Year-end charts ===
| Chart (1999) | Position |
|---|---|
| Canada Country Tracks (RPM) | 73 |
