= Girl Out of the Ordinary (song) =

Single by Beverley Mahood

from the album Girl Out of the Ordinary
- Released: 1997
- Genre: Country
- Length: 4:02
- Label: Spin
- Songwriters: Mark Dineen; Beverley Mahood
- Producer: J. Richard Hutt

Beverley Mahood singles chronology
"Girl Out of the Ordinary" (1997)	"Hook, Line and Sinker" (1997)

"Girl Out of the Ordinary" is a song recorded by Canadian country music artist Beverley Mahood. It was released in 1997 as the first single from her debut album, Girl Out of the Ordinary. It peaked at number 10 on the RPM Country Tracks chart in May 1997.

== Chart performance ==
Chart (1997)	Peak position
Canada Country Singles (RPM)	10

=== Year-end charts ===
Chart (1997)	Position
Canada Country Tracks (RPM)	91
