= Never Again, Again =

Single by Lee Ann Womack

from the album Lee Ann Womack
- Released: March 3, 1997
- Studio: Javelina (Nashville, Tennessee)
- Genre: Neotraditional country
- Length: 3:44 (album version); 3:20 (single version)
- Label: Decca Nashville
- Songwriters: Monty Holmes; Barbie Isham
- Producer: Mark Wright

Lee Ann Womack singles chronology
"Never Again, Again" (1997)	"The Fool" (1997)

"Never Again, Again" is a song written by Monty Holmes and Barbie Isham, and performed by American country music singer Lee Ann Womack. It was released as Womack's debut record in March 1997 on Decca Nashville and was later included in her 1997 album Lee Ann Womack. The single began Womack's career. It peaked at number 23 on the U.S. Billboard Hot Country Singles & Tracks (now Hot Country Songs) chart.

== Background ==
Womack told Billboard she was disappointed when the song peaked and said, "I cannot even begin to explain how bummed I was; I was devastated. That song was like my baby. It's a work of art, so incredibly simple. Anyone could have sung it, and I would have loved it." Frank Dawson of KAYD said, "It made such an immediate connection with the fans here that we consider it a big hit." Linda O'Brien, music director for KSCS said, "When Never Again, Again' was released, what a career chance she took, because that could have pegged her as this hick girl-singer. A lot of people probably didn't play it because it was too country, but I think she has helped tremendously. It's almost like a nouveau country, a nouveau traditional thing. She's paved the road for more artists to get back to the format."

== Critical reception ==
Editors at Billboard gave the song a positive review and wrote:

This is wonderful, tear-in-the-throat, honest-to-God country music in the grand tradition of Tammy Wynette, Loretta Lynn, and the genre's other legendary female vocalists. "Never Again" boasts a great country lyric, tinged with heartbreak and regret. The production by Mark Wright is laced with a weeping steel guitar, and Womack's vocals are the icing on an already scrumptious cake. Her voice echoes vulnerability and rings with emotional integrity. This is what country music in the '90s should be.

== Music video ==
Lee Ann Womack's first music video was released for the song, directed by Gerry Wenner.

Decca senior Vice President Shelia Shipley Biddy said, "We're also getting an unprecedented amount of E-mail from consumers hungry for her kind of music. The CMT video spurred an intense amount of interest. We started getting E-mail 15 minutes after the first airing of the video. We've had listeners say, 'This is what my country radio station should sound like.

== Chart performance ==
Chart (1997)	Peak position
Canada Country Singles (RPM)	36
US Bubbling Under Hot 100 (Billboard)	24
US Hot Country Songs (Billboard)	23
