= Amy Sky =

Canadian singer-songwriter and musician (born 1960)

- Born: 24 September 1960 (age 66); Toronto, Ontario, Canada
- Genres: Pop, country
- Occupations: Singer-songwriter, record producer, musician,
- Instruments: Guitar, piano, recorder, cello vocals
- Years active: 1989–present
- Labels: Iron, Café
- Website: www.amysky.com

Amy Sky (born 24 September 1960) is a Canadian singer-songwriter, record producer, theatre actress, and television host. Sky started classical music lessons at the age of five, and plays piano, guitar, cello and recorder. She has a degree from the University of Toronto in music theory and composition. In 1983, Sky was signed as a staff songwriter to MCA Music Nashville, and subsequently to Warner-Chappell Music in Los Angeles, EMI Music Los Angeles, and Warner-Chappell Music Germany. As a writer she has penned songs for many artists including Diana Ross, Anne Murray, Olivia Newton-John, Reba McEntire, Belinda Carlisle, Aaron Neville, Heart, Cyndi Lauper, Mark Masri, Roch Voisine, and Sheena Easton.

== Biography ==
=== Music career ===
In 1992, Sky's song "We Can't Look Back" was featured in the final moments and over the credits of the Degrassi TV movie School's Out. The song was co-written by Eddie Schwartz, famous for writing "Hit Me with Your Best Shot" and other Top 40 hits.

In 1996, Amy Sky released her 2nd breakthrough album Cool Rain (her first, 1989's A Breath of Fresh Air was shelved and finally released around 2010) and starred in a Toronto production of the musical Blood Brothers with David Cassidy and Michael Burgess. After being nominated for two Juno Awards, including best songwriter and best new artist, she released Burnt by the Sun in 1998, which also earned a nomination for best songwriter. The string of radio hits these albums produced garnered her three SOCAN awards. 2001 saw the release of Phenomenal Woman, which was followed in 2003 by Sky's fourth album, With This Kiss, a romance collection. In 2007, EMI released Life Lessons: The Best of Amy Sky. In 2008, Sky released a holiday album, The Lights of December. Between 2005 and 2012, she focused on her songwriting and producing for other artists.

Sky has collaborated with Olivia Newton-John several times, writing and producing songs for Newton-John's albums The Rumour (1988), Stronger Than Before (2005), Grace and Gratitude (2006) and Christmas Wish (2007). In 2008, Sky executive produced the fund raising album A Celebration in Song: Olivia Newton-John and Friends that accompanied Newton-John's Great Walk to Beijing. In April, Sky joined Newton-John and dozens of international musicians, actors, athletes and cancer survivors to walk the Great Wall of China to raise money for the Olivia Newton-John Cancer and Wellness Centre in Melbourne. In 2009, Green Hill Records released Grace and Gratitude Renewed, which included two new songs. In 2012, Sky made her return to her solo records with the release of Alive & Awake. As a companion to the album, there was a website and monthly newsletter dedicated to sharing information about mental health self care.

Sky has been nominated for East and West Coast Music Awards, the Canadian Independent Music Awards, and the International Songwriter's Award, and in 2007 won the Canadian Smooth Jazz Award for Best Composition. She is the first recipient ever of the CRIA Applause award, recognizing her work on behalf of artist rights. Sky speaks about and advocates for mental health issues.

=== Other work ===
In 2006, Sky was honoured for her work as a spokesperson in this area, with the CAMH Courage to Come Back award, and the Mood Disorders Association of Ontario Hero Inspiration Award. She continues to advocate for "mental hygiene", and in 2008 was featured on the covers of two magazines, Canadian Health and Lifestyle and the debut issue of Anchor, speaking about this topic.

Sky has hosted three seasons of parenting shows on Rogers TV, currently Enfagrow: The Toddler Years with Amy Sky.

Sky has lent her support to many charitable causes, including the Parkinson's Foundation, Princess Margaret Hospital, National Ovarian Cancer Association, The Hospital for Sick Children, Easter Seals, Variety, MADD (Mothers Against Drunk Driving), Mood Disorders of Ontario, United Way, Wellspring, Gilda's Club, Casey House, Covenant House, Ontario Child Abuse Prevention and Zareinu.

=== Personal life ===
Sky currently resides in Toronto, Ontario. She is married to musician Marc Jordan and they have two children together, a son, Ezra and a daughter, Zoe. Both Ezra and Zoe are musicians and performers as well; Ezra performs music under the name Ezra Jordan, and Zoe performs as Zoe Sky Jordan.

Sky is a member of the Canadian charity Artists Against Racism

== Discography ==
=== Albums ===
Year	Album
1989	A Breath of Fresh Air
1996	Cool Rain
1998	Burnt by the Sun
2001	Phenomenal Woman
2003	With This Kiss
2006	Life Lessons: The Best of Amy Sky
2008	The Lights of December
2012	Alive & Awake
2016	Liv On (with Olivia Newton-John and Beth Nielsen Chapman)

=== Singles ===
Year	Title	Chart positions			Album
Year	Title	CAN AC	CAN	CAN Country	Album
1996	"Don't Leave Me Alone"	7	63		Cool Rain
1996	"I Will Take Care of You"	4	57	51	Cool Rain
1997	"'Til You Love Somebody"	4	56	22	Cool Rain
1997	"If My Heart Had Wings"	8			Cool Rain
1998	"Love, Pain and the Whole Damn Thing"	6	23	58	Burnt by the Sun
1998	"Waterfall"	27			Burnt by the Sun
1999	"Heaven (Opened Up Its Doors)"	20			Burnt by the Sun
1999	"Ordinary Miracles"	39			Burnt by the Sun
2000	"Phenomenal Woman"				Phenomenal Woman
2001	"I Believe in Us"				Phenomenal Woman
2003	"Everything Love Is" (with Marc Jordan)				With This Kiss
2005	"Let It Shine"				Single only
2013	"On a Day Like Today"				Alive & Awake

=== Guest singles ===
Year	Title	Artist	Chart positions		Album
Year	Title	Artist	CAN AC	CAN	Album
1993	"'Til the Last Teardrop Falls"	Exchange (with Marc Jordan)	13	44	Exchange
1997	"All I Have"	Michael Burgess	38		A Place in the Sun
1998	"Two Story House"	Bruce Guthro	45		Of Your Son
