= Julian Austin (musician) =

Canadian country music singer

- Born: August 24, 1963 (age 62); Sussex, New Brunswick
- Genres: Country
- Occupation: singer
- Instrument: Guitar
- Years active: 1997–present
- Labels: ViK., Civilian, LMG, Little Ol' Records
- Website: www.julianaustin.com

Julian Austin (born August 24, 1963) is a Canadian country music singer. He has released more than fifteen singles in Canada, including the Number One hit "Little Ol' Kisses" (1997). In addition, Austin has recorded five studio albums.

== Biography ==
Austin released his first album, What My Heart Already Knows, on May 6, 1997. The album was certified gold by the Canadian Recording Industry Association for sales of 50,000 copies, and the first single, "Little Ol' Kisses," went to No. 1 the Canadian country singles chart. That same year, Austin won the Wrangler Rising Star Award from the Canadian Country Music Association (CCMA). All of the additional singles released from the album reached the top 20, including the No. 3 song, "Diamond." In 1998, Austin was nominated for Best Country Male Vocalist at the Juno Awards, but lost to Paul Brandt.

He moved to Calgary, Alberta in 1998 to work on his second album. However, the project was put on hold when he was injured in a bull-riding accident on January 9, 1999. Austin was left with several broken and cracked ribs, a punctured right lung, and a gaping hole in his right leg. After his recovery, Back in Your Life was released on March 7, 2000. The album included a cover of the Steve Miller classic "Take the Money and Run," which reached No. 4 on the Canadian country singles chart. The album earned Austin six CCMA nominations, and he was again nominated for Best Country Male at the Juno's, once again losing to Paul Brandt.

Austin left his record label, ViK. Recordings, in 2001. The following year, he was approached by Civilian Records president Myles Goodwyn. His third album, Bulletproof, was released on August 13, 2002. Singles from the album didn't perform well on the charts, and Austin left the label due to creative differences.

He began work on his fourth album in 2005, The Red and White, which was released by LMG Records in 2007. His fifth studio album, One for One, was released be Little Ol' Records on May 26, 2009.

== Personal life ==
Austin currently lives in Airdrie, Alberta with his wife Angela and their dog, Chippy. Austin is an avid supporter of the Canadian Forces. He has done performances for the troops and has made a tribute song to raise money for the Sapper Mike McTeague Wounded Warriors fund, called "The Red and White Brigade".

== Discography ==
=== Studio albums ===
Title	Details	Peak positions	Certifications
Title	Details	CAN Country	Certifications
What My Heart Already Knows	Release date: May 6, 1997; Label: ViK. Recordings	9	CAN: Gold
Back in Your Life	Release date: March 7, 2000; Label: ViK. Recordings	10	
Bulletproof	Release date: August 13, 2002; Label: Civilian Records	×	
The Red and White	Release date: May 11, 2007; Label: LMG Records	×	
One for One	Release date: May 26, 2009; Label: Little Ol' Records	×	
"×" indicates that no relevant chart existed or was archived

=== Singles ===
Year	Single	Peak positions	Album
Year	Single	CAN Country (Note: Peak positions from RPM Country Singles from 1997 to 2000 and Canada Country in 2008.)	Album
1997	"Little Ol' Kisses"	1	What My Heart Already Knows
1997	"Diamond"	3	What My Heart Already Knows
1998	"Two Out of Three Ain't Bad"	20	What My Heart Already Knows
1998	"What My Heart Already Knows"	12	What My Heart Already Knows
1998	"Hard Time Loving You"	13	What My Heart Already Knows
1999	"Back in Your Life"	14	Back in Your Life
2000	"Take the Money and Run"	4	Back in Your Life
2000	"Forever Loving You"	5	Back in Your Life
2000	"Baby Bye Bye"	40 (Note: "Baby Bye Bye" reached number 40 when RPM ceased publication in November 2000.)	Back in Your Life
2001	"Should Be Over You"	×	Back in Your Life
2002	"Pussycat"	×	Bulletproof
2002	"I'm So Over You"	×	Bulletproof
2003	"Only God Knows"	×	Bulletproof
2006	"He's Got What It Takes"	—	The Red and White
2006	"The Red and White"	—	The Red and White
2007	"Harbour Town"	—	The Red and White
2008	"Back to Me"	32	The Red and White
2008	"Marie"	—	The Red and White
2009	"Fat Bottomed Girls"	—	One for One
2009	"She Knows About Cryin'"	—	One for One
2009	"If Houston Doesn't Want You"	—	One for One
2010	"Goodbye Exit Sign"	—	One for One
2010	"Me and This Town"	—	Non-album singles
2011	"Christmas Was Born"	—	Non-album singles
2014	"Margaritaville"	—	Non-album singles
2015	"Let's Get Outta Here"	—	Non-album singles
2018	"Love Train"	—	Non-album singles
"—" denotes releases that did not chart "×" indicates that no relevant chart existed or was archived

=== Music videos ===
Year	Video	Director
1997	"Little Ol' Kisses"	
1997	"Diamond"	
2000	"Take the Money and Run"	Josh Levy
2000	"Forever Loving You"	
2002	"Pussycat"	
2009	"If Houston Doesn't Want You"	Alex Colthart

== Awards ==
Canadian Country Music Awards

- Wrangler Rising Star Award (1997)
