= Sails to the Wind =

Studio album by Bruce Guthro
- Released: 1994
- Genre: Country, folk
- Length: 32:35
- Label: AGL Independent
- Producer: Bill MacNeil and Gilles Godard

Bruce Guthro chronology
Sails to the Wind (1994)	Of Your Son (1998)

Sails to the Wind is the debut album from Canadian artist Bruce Guthro. It was released in 1994 by AGL Independent.

== Track listing ==
All songs written by Bruce Guthro

1. "Running Away" – 4:05
2. "I'll Surrender" – 4:06
3. "Him and God and Me" – 3:23
4. "Cheer Up Buddy" – 2:35
5. "I See It From Here" – 3:25
6. "Small Town Heroes" – 3:02
7. "Sails to the Wind" – 3:51
8. "Livin' in the 90's" – 3:40
9. "The Back Shore" – 2:19
10. "Men of the Deep" – 3:29
