= The Fool (Lee Ann Womack song) =

Single by Lee Ann Womack

from the album Lee Ann Womack
- B-side: "Trouble's Here"
- Released: May 19, 1997
- Genre: Country
- Length: 3:32
- Label: Decca Nashville
- Songwriters: Marla Cannon-Goodman, Gene Ellsworth, Charlie Stefl
- Producer: Mark Wright

Lee Ann Womack singles chronology
"Never Again, Again" (1997)	"The Fool" (1997)	"You've Got to Talk to Me" (1997)

Music video
- "The Fool" at CMT.com

"The Fool" is a song written by Marla Cannon-Goodman, Gene Ellsworth and Charlie Stefl, and recorded by American country music artist Lee Ann Womack. It was released in May 1997 as the second single from her eponymous debut album. The song peaked at number 2 on the U.S. Billboard Hot Country Singles & Tracks (now Hot Country Songs) chart, her first of four songs to just miss the top spot.

== Background ==
Womack told Billboard "The first time I played the demo, I just passed on it. I said, 'Yeah, it's a good song, but it's not 'Never Again Again."

== Content ==
"The Fool" is a slow ballad, backed by piano, violin, and percussion. The narrator describes an encounter with a woman who once was in a relationship with her partner, revealing that he still has feelings for her.

== Music video ==
A music video was released for the song, directed by Gerry Wenner. In the video, Womack is shown sitting in a bar singing, accompanied by a band.

== Critical reception ==
Editors at Billboard gave the song a positive review and wrote, "It's impossible to say enough positive things about Womack. She delivers this tune about a woman confronting, with her heart in her throat, the other woman her man still loves. The vulnerability and honesty she conveys in each line showcase a true stylist breathing life into a poignant lyric. This song and performance embody the best qualities of the genre--raw emotion set to music. It's a powerful thing.

== Chart performance ==
"The Fool" became Womack's first top five single on Billboards Hot Country Songs chart. The song peaked at number 2 for the chart week of October 4, 1997, blocked from number one by Diamond Rio's "How Your Love Makes Me Feel".

Chart (1997)	Peak position
Canada Country Singles (RPM)	5
US Hot Country Songs (Billboard)	2

=== Year-end charts ===
Chart (1997)	Position
Canada Country Tracks (RPM)	58
US Country Songs (Billboard)	34
