= Beautiful Life (Bruce Guthro album) =

Studio album by Bruce Guthro
- Released: 2006
- Genre: Pop/Folk
- Length: 46:03
- Label: EMI Music
- Producer: Malcolm Burn and David Lowery

Bruce Guthro chronology
| Guthro (2001) | Beautiful Life (2006) | No Final Destination (2009) |

Beautiful Life is the 2006 fourth album from Canadian artist Bruce Guthro. The album produced the singles "Beautiful Life", "Montreal", "Holy Road" and "Touch".

== Track listing ==
1. "Beautiful Life" – 3:11
2. "Wait" – 3:15
3. "Touch" – 3:25
4. "Come To Life" – 3:01
5. "Montreal" – 3:49
6. "Holy Road" – 3:56
7. "Here For You" – 4:01
8. "Full Blown Star" – 3:07
9. "Be Still" – 4:10
10. "Again" – 3:32
11. "Gwyneth's Song" – 4:00
12. "Jerusalem" – 2:39
13. "Someone" – 5:57

== Personnel ==
- Dave Burton – drums
- Kim Dunn – piano, keyboards, wurlitzer
- David Francey – background vocals
- Jamie Gatti – bass
- Great Big Sea – background vocals
- Bruce Guthro – guitar, composer, vocals
- Trine Mikkelsen – viola
- Chris Mitchell – flute, soprano saxophone
- Jamie Robinson – guitar, mandolin, electric guitar
- Robert Barrie - News Voice (Jerusalem)

and

- Christopher Mitchell – assistant engineer
- Martin Dam Kristensen – photography
