= Ivey's Wall =

Single by Bruce Guthro

from the album Of Your Son
- Released: 1998
- Genre: Country
- Length: 4:45
- Label: EMI
- Songwriter: Bruce Guthro
- Producer: Chad Irschick

Bruce Guthro singles chronology
"Falling" (1998)	"Ivey's Wall" (1998)	"Two Story House" (1999)

"Ivey's Wall" is a song written and recorded by Canadian singer-songwriter Bruce Guthro. It was released in 1998 as the third single from his second studio album, Of Your Son. It peaked at number 12 on the RPM Country Tracks chart in February 1999.

== Chart performance ==
Chart (1998–1999)	Peak position
Canada Country Singles (RPM)	12

=== Year-end charts ===
Chart (1999)	Position
Canada Country Tracks (RPM)	84
