= Lee Ann Womack (album) =

Studio album by Lee Ann Womack
- Released: May 13, 1997
- Studio: Javelina Studios (Nashville, Tennessee); Sound Kitchen (Franklin, Tennessee)
- Genre: Neotraditional country
- Length: 39:36
- Label: Decca Records
- Producer: Mark Wright

Lee Ann Womack chronology
Lee Ann Womack (1997)	Some Things I Know (1998)

Singles from Lee Ann Womack
- 1. "Never Again, Again" Released: March 3, 1997; 2. "The Fool" Released: May 19, 1997; 3. "You've Got to Talk to Me" Released: November 1, 1997; 4. "Buckaroo" Released: April 4, 1998

Lee Ann Womack is the debut studio album by American country music singer Lee Ann Womack. The album was certified gold by the RIAA on January 16, 1998, and platinum on September 24, 1999. Hits that appeared on the Billboard Hot Country Singles chart were "Never Again, Again" which peaked at #23, "The Fool" and "You've Got to Talk to Me" both at #2, and "Buckaroo" at #27. The album itself topped out at #9 on the Top Country Albums chart.

== Background ==
Womack told The Dallas Morning News, "Success doesn't really surprise me because it always goes in cycles and comes back around to country. I was fortunate to be the one that they decided to open the door for a little bit, the one they allowed to do this traditional thing." In another interview with The Dallas Morning News Womack revealed she recorded the album while her marriage to Jason Sellers was falling apart and said, "I hate to say that it was a bonus, but as terrible as it was – and it was going on while I was picking songs, while we were cutting the tracks, while I was doing vocals – I do think that pain did come across. I try not to pick songs that I can't deliver, that I don't understand, that I've not been through. The one thing that I want people to say about my music is that it's real."

Womack told Billboard, "I wanted Mark Wright to produce me, because of that full, fat sound he gets."

"Trouble's Here" was previously recorded by Jann Browne on her album Count Me In as was "Get Up in Jesus' Name" by Marty Raybon on his self-titled debut album; both were released in 1995.

== Musical style and composition ==
Lee Ann Womack has been described as a neotraditional country album, with comparisons made to Womack's vocal style and the musical instrumentation of the album to traditional country artists such as Dolly Parton and Tammy Wynette, and neotraditional contemporaries such as Lorrie Morgan and Reba McEntire.

== Critical reception ==
Professional ratings
Review scores
Source	Rating
Allmusic	3/5 stars
USA Today	3.5/5 stars
Belfast News Letter	(favorable)
Entertainment Weekly	(A)
Billboard	(favorable) link
Robert Christgau	link
Country Standard Time	(favorable)

David Zimmerman of USA Today gave the album three and a half stars and wrote, "Womack is a deep-country singer whose skill with heartbreak and confessional songs will prompt Lorrie Morgan comparisons. Womack is at her best immersed in hurting ballads like The Fool, but the truly beautiful song here is the old-fashioned duet Make Memories With Me, in which she holds her own with Mark Chesnutt as he pulls out his best heart-tugger vocal tricks. Billy Kennedy of the Belfast News Letter wrote, "She combines tears and torment in her songs with some light-hearted lyrics and Nashville DJs who normally show a preference for crossover material have really taken to her." Editors at Billboard gave the album a positive review and wrote, "This is a beacon for country music's journey out of the desert and into the Promised Land. Great voice, great songs, and great production make this one of the most impressive debut albums in some time. Lee Ann Womack pays homage to country's rich tradition without sounding retro. She can handle hard-driving, truck-driving tunes, gospel songs, and tender ballads with equal aplomb here." Mario Tarradel of The Dallas Morning News listed the album as the best country album of 1997 and wrote, "Country music should have heart, grit, emotion and realism. It should offer universal truths in four gripping minutes. Lee Ann Womack's first album delivers country's hallmarks with elegance and poignancy." Dene Hallam of KKBQ said, "The singing is extraordinary, the material is extraordinary, and Mark Wright has produced the album of his life. I would be surprised if this album doesn't go triple-platinum." Alanna Nash of Entertainment Weekly gave the album an A rating and wrote, "This native of Jacksonville, Tex., has more heart than any other new female country singer, and a passel of traditional-sounding songs that may just be good enough to turn Nashville's commercial tide." David Hajdu also of Entertainment Weekly listed the album as one of the top of 1997 and wrote, "If country had a breakthrough female this year, it was Womack, who combined Dolly's tremolo, Tammy's sob, and Reba's elongated vowels into a fetching tradition-based style. Her success – she's just gone gold – could help turn Nashville back to its hard-country roots." Thom Owens of AllMusic gave the album three stars and wrote, "The slick, professional production helps make this self-titled album a pleasant listen, despite the fairly uneven songwriting, and Womack certainly has a voice that can make the mediocre sound appealing, which results in a winning debut."

== Track listing ==
No.	Title	Writer(s)	Length
1.	"Never Again, Again"	Monty Holmes; Barbie Isham	3:44
2.	"A Man with 18 Wheels"	Bobby Carmichael; Leslie Satcher	3:20
3.	"You've Got to Talk to Me"	Jamie O'Hara	3:38
4.	"The Fool"	Marla Cannon-Goodman; Gene Ellsworth; Charlie Stefl	3:32
5.	"Am I the Only Thing That You've Done Wrong"	Billy Joe Foster; Lee Ann Womack; Jason Sellers	3:48
6.	"Buckaroo"	Mark D. Sanders; Ed Hill	2:59
7.	"Make Memories with Me" (duet with Mark Chesnutt)	Satcher; Danny Steagall	3:33
8.	"Trouble's Here"	Jann Browne; Matt Barnes	3:08
9.	"Do You Feel for Me"	Tim Johnson	3:23
10.	"Montgomery to Memphis"	Billy Montana; Anne Reeves	4:41
11.	"Get Up in Jesus' Name"	Mike Curtis; Marty Raybon	3:51
Total length:			39:36

== Personnel ==
Compiled from liner notes.

- Lee Ann Womack – vocals, backing vocals
- Steve Nathan – acoustic piano (1, 2, 4–10), Wurlitzer electric piano, Hammond B3 organ
- Abe Manuel – accordion
- Tony Brown – acoustic piano (3)
- Gary Smith – acoustic piano (11)
- Pat Flynn – acoustic guitar
- Brent Mason – electric guitars
- Biff Watson – acoustic guitar
- Larry Byrom – electric guitars (7)
- Paul Franklin – steel guitar
- Mike Brignardello – bass
- Lonnie Wilson – drums
- Tom Roady – percussion
- Larry Franklin – fiddle
- The Nashville String Machine – strings
- Bergen White – string arrangements, backing vocals
- Carl Gorodetzky – string conductor
- Liana Manis – backing vocals
- Gene Miller – backing vocals
- John Wesley Ryles – backing vocals
- Leslie Satcher – backing vocals
- Ricky Skaggs – backing vocals
- Sharon White Skaggs – backing vocals
- Lisa Silver – backing vocals
- Curtis Young – backing vocals
- Mark Chesnutt – vocals (7)

=== Production ===
- Mark Wright – producer
- Greg Droman – recording, overdub recording, mixing
- Robert Charles – overdub recording
- Joe Hayden – recording assistant
- Jason Garner – overdub assistant
- Tim Coyle – mix assistant
- Ronnie Thomas – digital editing
- Hank Williams – mastering
- MasterMix (Nashville, Tennessee) – editing and mastering location
- John Drioli – project coordinator
- Travis Hill – project coordinator
- Brandi Thomas – project coordinator
- Gina R. Binkley – art direction
- Janice Booker – design
- Russ Harrington – photography
- Melanie Shelley – hair, make-up
- Sheri McCoy-Haynes – wardrobe

== Charts ==
=== Weekly charts ===
Chart (1997)	Peak position
US Billboard 200	106
US Top Country Albums (Billboard)	9
US Heatseekers Albums (Billboard)	1
UK Country Albums (OCC)	4

=== Year-end charts ===
Chart (1997)	Position
US Top Country Albums (Billboard)	46
Chart (1998)	Position
US Top Country Albums (Billboard)	51

== Certifications ==
Region	Certification	Certified units/sales
United States (RIAA)	Platinum	1,000,000^{^}
^{^} Shipments figures based on certification alone.
