= Little Ol' Kisses =

Single by Julian Austin

from the album What My Heart Already Knows
- Released: 1997
- Genre: Country
- Length: 2:29
- Label: ViK. Recordings
- Songwriter: Julian Austin
- Producer: Daniel LeBlanc

Julian Austin singles chronology
"Little Ol' Kisses" (1997)	"Diamond" (1997)

"Little Ol' Kisses" is a single by Canadian country music artist Julian Austin. Released in 1997, it was the first single from Austin's album What My Heart Already Knows. The song reached #1 on the RPM Country Tracks chart in July 1997.

== Chart performance ==
Chart (1997)	Peak position
Canada Country Singles (RPM)	1

=== Year-end charts ===
Chart (1997)	Position
Canada Country Tracks (RPM)	6
