= Guthro =

Studio album by Bruce Guthro
- Released: 2001
- Genre: Pop/Folk
- Length: 44:16
- Label: EMI
- Producer: Malcolm Burn and David Lowery

Bruce Guthro chronology
Of Your Son (1998)	Guthro (2001)	Beautiful Life (2005)

Guthro is a 2001 album from Canadian artist Bruce Guthro. The album produced the singles Disappear, Factory Line, Livin' A Lie, 4 A.M. and The Songsmith. The album is also noted for Guthro crossing over to pop from country.

== Track listing ==
1. "Hopeless" – 4:42
2. "Disappear" – 2:47
3. "Livin' A Lie" – 3:48
4. "Hey Mister" – 3:21
5. "Dig in Deep" – 3:50
6. "4 A.M." – 4:52
7. "Songsmith" – 4:12
8. "Squeezed" – 3:25
9. "Wonderful Night" – 3:11
10. "Don't Go" – 4:35
11. "In the Morning" – 3:19
12. "Factory Line" – 4:54
