= Love Working on You =

Single by John Michael Montgomery

from the album Leave a Mark
- Released: March 9, 1998
- Genre: Country
- Length: 4:00
- Label: Atlantic
- Songwriters: Jim Collins, Craig Wiseman
- Producer: Csaba Petocz

John Michael Montgomery singles chronology
| "Angel in My Eyes" (1997) | "Love Working on You" (1998) | "Cover You in Kisses" (1998) |

"Love Working on You" is a song written by Jim Collins and Craig Wiseman, and recorded by American country music artist John Michael Montgomery. It was released in March 1998 as the first single from his album Leave a Mark. It peaked at number 14 in the United States, while peaking at number 8 in Canada.

== Critical reception ==
Larry Flick, of Billboard magazine reviewed the song favorably saying that it "kicks off with a rootsy guitar intro that gives way to Montgomery's solid performance." He goes on to say that Petocz's production has a "raw and earthly edge that seems to bring out the best in Montgomery's vocals."

== Music video ==
The music video was directed by Jim Shea and premiered in mid-1998. Featuring former model Amy Dorris.

== Chart positions ==
"Love Working on You" debuted at number 74 on the U.S. Billboard Hot Country Singles & Tracks for the week of March 14, 1998.

| Chart (1998) | Peak position |
|---|---|
| Canada Country Singles (RPM) | 8 |
| US Bubbling Under Hot 100 (Billboard) | 25 |
| US Hot Country Songs (Billboard) | 14 |

=== Year-end charts ===
| Chart (1998) | Position |
|---|---|
| Canada Country Tracks (RPM) | 87 |
