= Cover You in Kisses =

Single by John Michael Montgomery

from the album Leave a Mark
- Released: May 25, 1998
- Genre: Country
- Length: 3:56
- Label: Atlantic
- Songwriters: Jerry Kilgore, Jess Brown, Brett Jones
- Producers: Csaba Petocz, John Michael Montgomery

John Michael Montgomery singles chronology
"Love Working on You" (1998)	"Cover You in Kisses" (1998)	"Hold On to Me" (1998)

Music video
- "Cover You in Kisses" on YouTube

"Cover You in Kisses" is a song recorded by American country music artist John Michael Montgomery from his album Leave a Mark (1998). It was written by Jerry Kilgore, Jess Brown and Brett Jones, and produced by Montgomery and Csaba Petocz. It was released on May 25, 1998, as the album's second single.

The song reached number three on the US Billboard Hot Country Singles & Tracks chart and number two on the Canadian RPM Country chart. It also peaked at number 91 on the US Billboard Hot 100. The song also charted on the year-end Country charts for both Canada and the US.

== Composition ==
"Cover You in Kisses" was originally published in the key of F♯ major in common time with a tempo of 116 beats per minute.

== Critical reception ==
Larry Flick of Billboard magazine reviewed the song favorably, saying that Montgomery delivers a likeable performance. He went on to say that the production has an "easy, summertime feel that should serve radio well." He states that the only negative is the fact that the song is "pretty lightweight" with not a lot of substance.

== Chart performance ==
"Cover You in Kisses" debuted at number 68 on the US Billboard Hot Country Singles & Tracks for the week of May 30, 1998.

Chart (1998)	Peak position
Canada Country 100 (RPM)	2
US Billboard Hot 100	91
US Hot Country Songs (Billboard)	3

=== Year-end charts ===
Chart (1998)	Position
Canada Country Tracks (RPM)	18
US Country Songs (Billboard)	40
