= Brent McAthey =

Canadian singer

- Born: August 4, 1967 (age 57)
- Origin: Calgary, Alberta, Canada
- Genres: Country
- Occupation: Singer
- Instrument: Vocals
- Years active: 1989–present
- Labels: Arial Records
- Website: www.thebrenster.ca

Brent McAthey (born August 4, 1967) is a Canadian country music artist. McAthey has released six studio albums. He reached the Top 20 of the RPM Country Tracks chart in 1998 with "Chevy Blue Eyes."

== Discography ==
=== Albums ===
Year	Album
1993	Waitin' for the Sun
1999	Believe in Me
2000	My Country Collection
2004	I Can Go as Far as Mexico
2006	Blame It on Mexico
2009	Smooth Sailin'

A simpler life	2020

=== Singles ===
Year	Single	CAN Country	Album
1991	"You and the Ocean"	75	Album I can go as far as Mexico
1996	"As Far as I Can See"	41	Waitin' for the Sun
1996	"Wait for the Sun"	58	Waitin' for the Sun
1997	"Roots"	57	Waitin' for the Sun
1997	"Chevy Blue Eyes"	20	Believe in Me
1998	"Slow Motion"	30	Believe in Me
1999	"Hard Rockabilly Cafe"	34	Believe in Me
2000	"I Don't Love Easily"	27	Believe in Me
2000	"Believe in Me"	*	Believe in Me

Musician not a politician	Brent Mcathey Single only
	2022

The songs he left	2023
Brent Mcathey	Single only
