= Bruce Guthro =

Canadian singer (1961–2023)

Bruce Guthro ONS
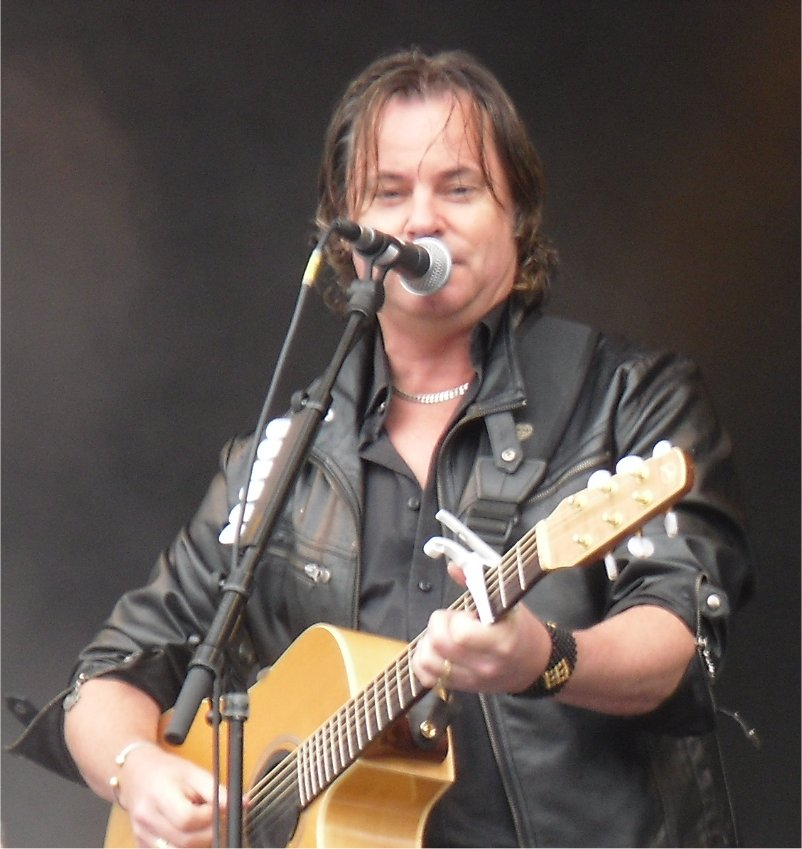
- Guthro performing in 2010

Background information
- Born: August 31, 1961; Sydney Mines, Cape Breton Island, Nova Scotia, Canada
- Died: September 5, 2023 (aged 62) Halifax, Nova Scotia, Canada
- Genres: Folk; country; pop; Celtic rock
- Occupation: Singer-songwriter
- Years active: 1994–2023
- Labels: MCA Records; EMI Music Canada; RecArt; Ridge Records
- Formerly of: Runrig
- Website: www.bruceguthro.com

Bruce Guthro ONS (August 31, 1961 – September 5, 2023) was a Canadian singer-songwriter from Cape Breton Island, Nova Scotia. Guthro recorded as a solo artist, and was lead vocalist for the Scottish Celtic rock band Runrig from 1998, until the group retired in 2018. Guthro received several ECMAs (East Coast Music Awards), and hosted and conceptualized the Canadian TV show Songwriters Circle, on which guests included Jim Cuddy, Colin James, and Alan Doyle (of the Canadian band Great Big Sea).

Guthro was also the father of musicians Dylan Guthro and Jodi Guthro. He co-produced Dylan's award-winning 2012 debut album All That's True with Dave Gunning and co-wrote five of the album's songs.

Guthro died from cancer on September 5, 2023, five days after his 62nd birthday. On October 4, 2023, he was posthumously appointed a member of the Order of Nova Scotia for contributions to the music industry, Canadian culture and philanthropy.

== Discography ==
=== Albums ===
Title	Details	Peak positions		Certifications (sales thresholds)
Title	Details	CAN Country	DEN	Certifications (sales thresholds)
Sails to the Wind	Release date: 1994; Label: MCA	—	—	
Of Your Son	Release date: 1998; Label: EMI	6	—	CAN: Gold
Guthro	Release date: 2001; Label: EMI	—	—	
Beautiful Life	Release date: 2006; Label: RecArt	—	—	
No Final Destination	Release date: September 7, 2009; Label: Ridge	—	39	
Celtic Crossing	Release date: October 17, 2011; Label: Ridge	—	8	
Bound for Bethlehem	Release date: 2012; Label: RecArt	—	18	
"—" denotes releases that did not chart

=== Singles ===
Year	Single	Peak chart positions			Album
Year	Single	CAN Country	CAN AC	CAN	Album
1997	"Walk This Road"	1	16	—	Of Your Son
1998	"Falling"	15	12	39	Of Your Son
1998	"Ivey's Wall"	12	—	—	Of Your Son
1999	"Two Story House" (with Amy Sky)	—	45	—	Of Your Son
1999	"Good Love"	—	27	—	Of Your Son
2001	"Factory Line"	—	—	—	Guthro
2001	"Disappear"	—	—	—	Guthro
2001	"Livin' a Lie"	—	—	—	Guthro
2007	"Touch"	—	—	—	Beautiful Life
"—" denotes releases that did not chart

=== Music videos ===
Year	Video	Director
1997	"Fiddle & Bow" (with Natalie MacMaster)	Andrew MacNaughtan
1997	"Walk This Road"	Pablo Fairhall
1998	"Falling"	George Dougherty
2001	"Disappear"	
2007	"Holy Road"	

=== Samplers ===
Year	Title	Album
1995	"Stan's Tune"	Remembering Stan Rogers: An East Coast Tribute
1996	"So Blue"	An East Coast Tribute II
2000	"Four Strong Winds" (with Raylene Rankin)	Over Canada (Soundtrack)
2010	"Acadie, Sing Me Home" (with Blair Douglas)	Celtic Greatest

=== Guest appearances ===
Year	Title	Artist	Album
1997	"Fiddle & Bow"	Natalie MacMaster	No Boundaries
2008	"Acadie, Sing Me Home"	Blair Douglas	Stay Strong

=== Awards ===
Year	Award	Category
1997	East Coast Music Award	Songwriter of the Year (Fiddle and Bow)
1998	Canadian Radio Music Award	Solo Artist of the Year
1998	Canadian Country Music Awards	Rising Star of the Year
1999	East Coast Music Award	Male Artist of the Year
1999	East Coast Music Award	Pop/Rock Artist of the Year
1999	East Coast Music Award	Single of the Year (Falling)
1999	East Coast Music Award	SOCAN Songwriter of the Year (Falling)
1999	East Coast Music Award	Album of the Year (Of Your Son)
2002	East Coast Music Award	Male Artist of the Year
2002	East Coast Music Award	Pop Artist/Group of the Year
2002	East Coast Music Award	Album of the Year (Guthro)
