= Burnin' the Roadhouse Down (song) =

Single by Steve Wariner with Garth Brooks

from the album Burnin' the Roadhouse Down
- B-side: "Road Trippin'"
- Released: July 13, 1998
- Genre: Country
- Length: 2:07
- Label: Capitol Nashville
- Songwriters: Steve Wariner, Rick Carnes
- Producer: Steve Wariner

Steve Wariner singles chronology
"Road Trippin'" (1998)	"Burnin' the Roadhouse Down" (1998)	"Every Little Whisper" (1998)

Garth Brooks singles chronology
"To Make You Feel My Love" (1998)	"Burnin' the Roadhouse Down" (1998)	"You Move Me" (1998)

"Burnin' the Roadhouse Down" is a song recorded by American country music artists Steve Wariner and Garth Brooks. It was released on July 13, 1998 as the third single and title track from Wariner's album Burnin' the Roadhouse Down. The song reached number 26 on the Billboard Hot Country Singles & Tracks chart. Wariner wrote the song with Rick Carnes.

== Chart performance ==
Chart (1998)	Peak position
Canada Country Singles (RPM)	14
US Hot Country Songs (Billboard)	26
