= Back to You (album) =

Studio album by Anita Cochran
- Released: April 22, 1997
- Genre: Country
- Length: 40:59
- Label: Warner Bros.
- Producer: Anita Cochran; Jim Ed Norman

Anita Cochran chronology
Back to You (1997)	Anita (1999)

Back to You is the debut studio album by American country music artist Anita Cochran. It was released in 1997 by Warner Bros. Records and peaked at number 24 on the Billboard Top Country Albums chart. The album includes the singles "I Could Love a Man Like That," "Daddy Can You See Me," "Will You Be Here?", and "What If I Said," a duet with Steve Wariner which reached number 1 on Hot Country Songs.

== Critical reception ==
Giving it 4 out of 5 stars, Allmusic reviewer Thom Owens wrote that "for most of Back to You, Cochran's music is unpredictable and exciting, as her songwriting is inspired and her musicianship is fresh. It's a first-rate debut."

== Track listing ==
All songs written by Anita Cochran except where noted.

No.	Title	Writer(s)	Length
1.	"I Could Love a Man Like That"		3:09
2.	"Will You Be Here?"		4:08
3.	"Daddy Can You See Me"		4:36
4.	"She Wants to Ride"		4:20
5.	"What If I Said" (duet with Steve Wariner)		4:52
6.	"You're the Break"	Karen Staley, Keith Burns	2:48
7.	"One of Those Days"		4:02
8.	"Girls Like Fast Cars"		3:40
9.	"Wrong Side of Town"		4:17
10.	"Back to You"	Cochran, Mary Ann Kennedy	5:07

== Personnel ==
- Eddie Bayers - drums
- Anita Cochran - banjo, Dobro, electric guitar, lead vocals, background vocals
- Eric Darken - percussion
- Stuart Duncan - fiddle, viola
- Danny Dunn - steel guitar
- Paul Franklin - steel guitar
- Rob Hajacos - fiddle
- Troy Lancaster - electric guitar
- Terry McMillan - harmonica, percussion
- Phil Madeira - accordion, organ
- Nashville String Machine - strings
- Steve Nathan - piano
- Don Potter - acoustic guitar
- Michael Rhodes - bass guitar
- Matt Rollings - organ, piano
- Brent Rowan - electric guitar
- Steve Wariner - duet vocals on "What If I Said"
- Willie Weeks - bass guitar

== Chart performance ==
Chart (1997)	Peak position
U.S. Billboard Top Country Albums	24
U.S. Billboard 200	173
U.S. Billboard Top Heatseekers	9
