= Thomas Wade (singer) =

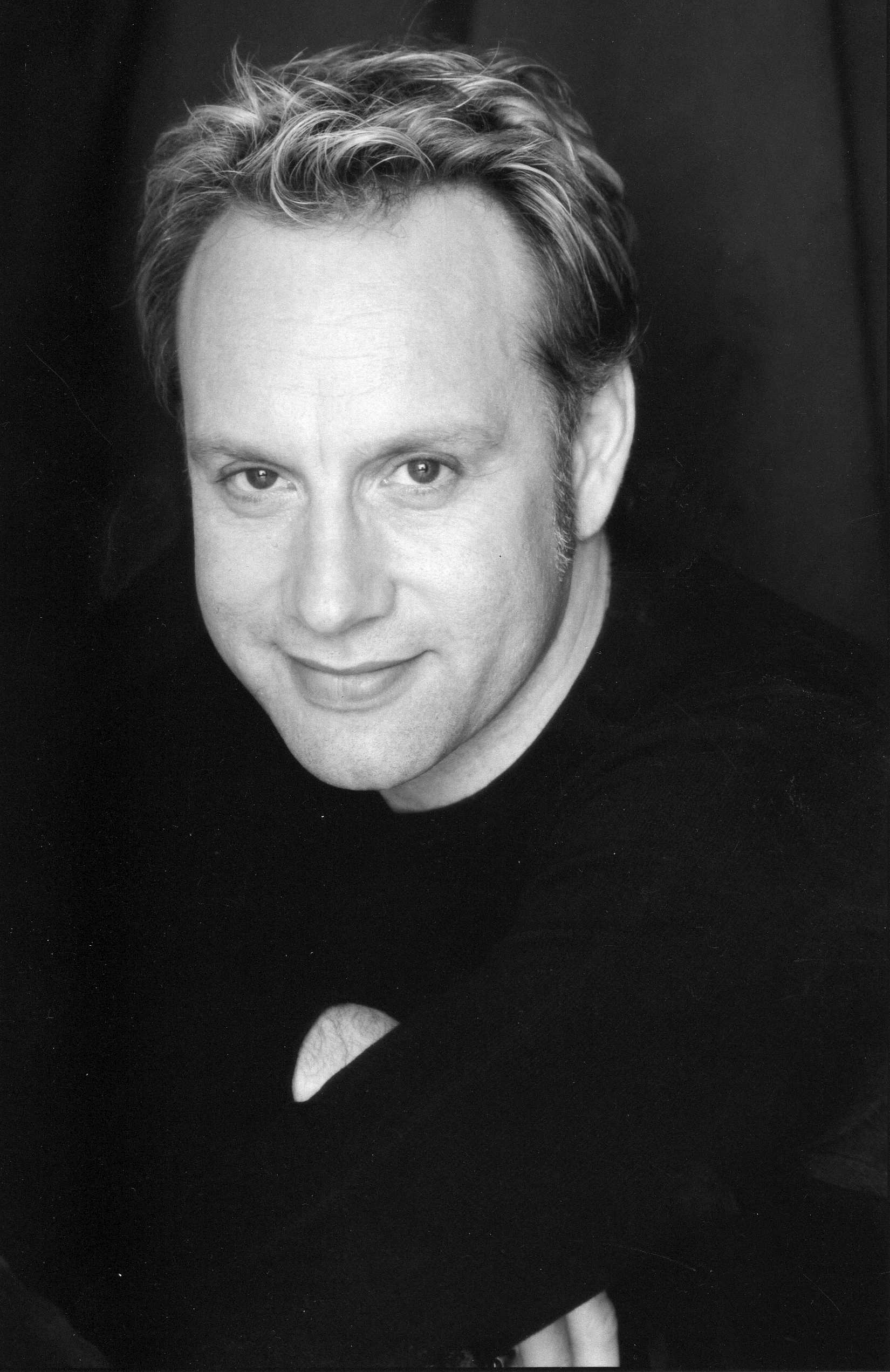

Background information
- Born: May 9, 1961 (age 65)
- Origin: Burford, Ontario, Canada
- Genres: Country, blues
- Occupation: Singer-songwriter
- Instruments: Vocals, guitar
- Years active: 1996–present
- Labels: Peg Music; Shoreline Records; Spin Records
- Website: http://www.thomaswade.ca

Thomas Wade (born May 9, 1961) is a Canadian country artist. He was the lead singer of the group Thomas Wade & Wayward, who released their eponymous debut album in 1996. The album produced seven singles on the Canadian country music chart, including the top 10s "Zero to Sixty" and "She's Getting Serious". Between 1997 and 1999, Thomas Wade & Wayward received seven CCMA awards, winning best group or duo three times, and both independent single and song awards for '97 and '98. The group was also nominated for three Juno Awards for Best Country Group or Duo in 1997, 1998 and 1999. Between 1996 and 2001, Wade placed twelve videos in the top twenty on CMT, including the number one "Lying Here with You'".

Wade launched a solo career in 2000 when he signed to Shoreline Records and released his debut album, Lucky 13. Five singles were released from the album, including the top 10 "Running Away with You". Following the release of a career retrospective in 2001, So Far, Wade was diagnosed with oromandibular dystonia. While he was forced to end his recording career, he has continued his career as a songwriter. Celine Dion included one of Wade's songs, "Come to Me", on her 2004 album Miracle. Due to cutting-edge work in neuroplasticity, Wade began to heal early in 2010 and as of May 2015 went into the studio to record a new album called Blue Country Soul at Phase One Studios in Toronto, Ontario. Largely co-written with Canadian songwriter Tim Taylor, this record is a return to Wade's musical roots, the music of the fifties, classic country and blues as well as a musical reunion with bassist John Dymond, keyboardist Steve O'Connor and drummer Gary Craig. As of 2016, Wade has been touring again as a headlining act. A book and a documentary is in production about his career and battle with dystonia.

== Discography ==
=== Studio albums ===
Title	Details
Thomas Wade & Wayward	Release date: March 11, 1996; Label: Peg Music
Lucky 13	Release date: August 27, 2000; Label: AME/Shoreline Records

=== Compilation albums ===
Title	Details
So Far	Release date: 2002; Label: Spin Records

=== Singles ===
Year	Single	Peak positions	Album
Year	Single	CAN Country	Album
1991	"Breakin' in a Broken Heart"	78	Single only
1996	"Sittin' Pretty"	14	Thomas Wade & Wayward
1996	"Zero to Sixty"	8	Thomas Wade & Wayward
1997	"Lying Here with You"	19	Thomas Wade & Wayward
1997	"She's Getting Serious"	6	Thomas Wade & Wayward
1997	"There's a Song in There Somewhere"	12	Thomas Wade & Wayward
1998	"I Read Lips"	12	Thomas Wade & Wayward
1998	"For Better or Worse"	39	Thomas Wade & Wayward
1999	"Running Away with You"	9	Lucky 13
1999	"If You Ain't Got It"	25	Lucky 13
2000	"Some Guys"	25	Lucky 13
2001	"Wild, Wild, Wild Ride"	*	Lucky 13
2001	"The Loser Wins Again"	*	Lucky 13
2002	"I'd Say It Again"	*	So Far
2003	"Angel's Wings"	*	So Far
* denotes unknown peak positions

=== Music videos ===
Year	Video
1996	"Sittin' Pretty"
1996	"Zero to Sixty"
1997	"Lying Here with You"
1997	"She's Getting Serious"
1998	"I Read Lips"
1998	"For Better or Worse"
1999	"Running Away with You"
1999	"If You Ain't Got It"
2000	"Some Guys"
2001	"Wild, Wild, Wild Ride"
2001	"The Loser Wins Again"
2002	"I'd Say It Again"
