= Beverley Mahood =

Canadian singer and television host

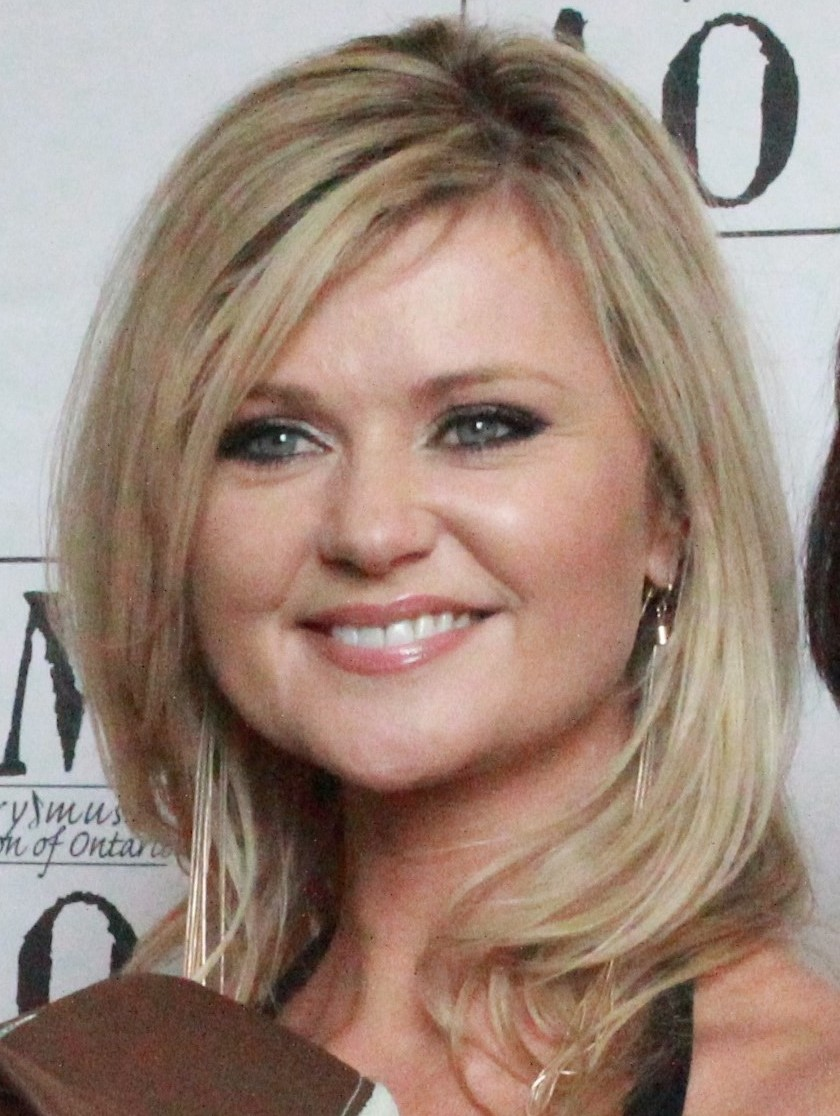

Background information
- Born: 2 November 1974 (age 51); Belfast, Northern Ireland, United Kingdom
- Origin: London, Ontario, Canada
- Genres: Country, pop
- Occupations: Singer, songwriter
- Years active: 1996–present
- Labels: Spin Records; BPM Entertainment Corp.
- Formerly of: Lace
- Website: beverleymahood.com

Beverley Mahood (born 2 November 1974) is an Irish born Canadian country music singer-songwriter and television host based in Ontario, Canada. Mahood emigrated from Belfast to Canada as a child. She is also formerly part of the all-female trio Lace, produced by David Foster. From 2004 to 2005, she co-hosted the Citytv Vancouver morning show, Breakfast Television. Mahood was then named to co-host CMT Canada's flagship show, CMT Central. She starred as the anchor judge on the series "CMT Chevy Karaoke Star." Other hosting duties have included the reality series Project Mom/Project Dad and Pick a Puppy (2010–2013) and the countdown program Ultimate.

Mahood established a business partnership in 2005 with Canadian entrepreneur W. Brett Wilson in forming BPM Entertainment Corp. to pursue creative investment opportunities in the entertainment world. She bought out his interest in BPMEC in 2012. Mahood attended Saunders High School in London.

== Biography ==
=== Music career ===
Mahood has been building her profile in the music scene throughout Canada and the United States since her debut album, Girl Out of the Ordinary, was released in 1998. The album garnered multiple radio singles and music videos. She signed with 143 Records, a record label owned by record producer David Foster. With Foster, she was part of the female trio, Lace, releasing an album, Lace, in 1999. The first single, "I Want a Man", went to number 7 on the charts in Canada and was a number one video on CMT's Chevy Top 20. A second solo CD, Moody Blue, was released in 2004, receiving recognition with another number one CMT video for the single "The First Day You Wake Up Alone."

In addition to her own recorded material, Mahood co-wrote the hit single "Come to Me," recorded by Celine Dion on her 2005 Miracle album. She also wrote "Good to Be Alive," the theme for the CMT reality series' Project Mother and Project Dad, which was released to radio in 2007 with an accompanying music video airing on CMT. In May 2008, Mahood marked her return as a recording artist with the release of the song, "This Girl." A second single, "Rewrite History," was released in October 2008. Mahood's new album, Unmistakable, was released on 18 November 2008. Her most recent Christmas album, This Christmas Celebrate Me Home, was released on 4 November 2008. In May 2013, Mahood released a new single, "Hope & Gasoline," to Canadian country radio. Mahood's fourth album was released on 12 November 2013. The album was re-released in 2017 as "New Religion" with extra tracks.

=== Acting career ===
In 2006, Mahood contributed her name and image to the Bootlegger Jean print campaign with her image appearing in stores across North America. As an actress, she has performed in The Vagina Monologues (2004), the stage production Heartthrobs (2003) and Castle Rocks (Young People's Theatre, 1998).

She performed in the 2004 television film Chicks with Sticks. Mahood was cast to be the singing superheroine Dazzler in X-Men: The Last Stand (2006). However, she did not shoot any scenes as her character (and many others) were cut from the film.

=== Charity work ===
Mahood has and continues to host the Kinsmen Telemiracle in Saskatchewan annually each March, with 2024 being the 27th year that she has done so. As the host of the Saskatchewan-based telethon, Mahood performs and sings, as well as introducing talent and speaking with various people who have raised funds. Mahood also sings the Telemiracle theme song "Thank You", which has been that telethon's theme since 2021.

She also performed at The Bohemian Ball in Toronto on 20 February 2009. The 2009 Bohemian Ball, organised by the Canada Czech Republic Chamber of Commerce, was held in support of the SickKids Foundation and the Hospital for Sick Children.

Mahood is a supporter of the following initiatives: the Juvenile Diabetes Research Foundation, the Alberta's Children's Hospital, the David Foster Foundation and the CIBC Run for the Cure. She is also the spokesperson for the Pink Mitten Campaign, which raises money for breast cancer research, education and awareness programs.

== Discography ==
=== Albums ===
Title	Details
Girl Out of the Ordinary	Release date: 3 February 1998; Label: Spin Records
Moody Blue	Release date: 23 March 2004; Label: Spin Records
Have a Little Faith	Release date: 2006; Label: Spin Records
This Christmas Celebrate Me Home	Release date: 4 November 2008; Label: BPM Entertainment
Unmistakable	Release date: 4 November 2008; Label: BPM Entertainment
Hope and Gasoline	Release date: 12 November 2013; Label: Spin Music

=== Singles ===
Year	Single	Peak positions	Album
Year	Single	CAN Country	Album
1997	"Girl Out of the Ordinary"	10	Girl Out of the Ordinary
1997	"A Little Thing Called Love"	12	Girl Out of the Ordinary
1998	"Let's Kiss and Make Up" (with Ken Munshaw)	17	Girl Out of the Ordinary
1998	"Radio 101"	17	Girl Out of the Ordinary
1999	"I Love How You Listen to Me"	23	Girl Out of the Ordinary
1999	"The Way a Woman Feels"	38	Girl Out of the Ordinary
2002	"Absolutely"	—	—N/a
2003	"The First Day You Wake Up Alone"	21	Moody Blue
2004	"I Like That Shirt"	29	Moody Blue
2005	"End of a Long Goodbye"	—	Moody Blue
2005	"My Wheels Got Wings"	—	Moody Blue
2005	"Making It Up as You Go"	19	Moody Blue
2007	"Good to Be Alive"	46	Unmistakable
2008	"This Girl"	31	Unmistakable
2008	"Rewrite History"	—	Unmistakable
2013	"Hope and Gasoline"	16	Hope and Gasoline
2013	"I Can't Outrun You"	48	Hope and Gasoline
2014	"Sunday I'm an Angel"	24	New Religion
2015	"Atmosphere"	—	New Religion
2016	"New Religion"	—	New Religion
"—" denotes releases that did not chart

==== As a featured artist ====
Year	Single	Artist	Album
1999	"Which Way Is Love"	John Landry	Forever Took Too Long
2001	"Couple on the Cake"	Steve Fox	Small World
2016	"You're My Home"	Mark Wills	—N/a

=== Music videos ===
Year	Video	Director
1997	"Girl Out of the Ordinary"	Terrance Odette
1997	"Hook, Line and Sinker"	Terrance Odette
1997	"A Little Thing Called Love"	
1997	"All Through the Night"	
1998	"Let's Kiss and Make Up" (with Ken Munshaw)	
1998	"Radio 101"	
1999	"The Way a Woman Feels"	
1999	"Which Way Is Love" (with John Landry)	
2001	"Couple on the Cake" (with Steve Fox)	Terrance Odette
2001	"Christmas Lullaby"	
2002	"Absolutely"	
2002	"God Rest Ye Merry Gentlemen"	
2003	"The First Day You Wake Up Alone"	Steven Goldmann
2007	"Good to Be Alive"	Warren P. Sonoda
2008	"This Girl"	Margaret Malandruccolo
2008	"Freckles"	
2012	"Taking Care of Christmas" (with Randy Bachman)	
2013	"Hope and Gasoline"	Jeth Weinrich
2013	"I Can't Outrun You"	Jeth Weinrich
2014	"Sunday I'm an Angel"	Jeth Weinrich
2014	"Chariots of Fire" (with Kenny Munshaw)	Jeth Weinrich

== Awards ==
- CCMA Independent Female Artist – 2004, 1999, 1998
- CMT Independent Recording Artist of the Year, 1997
- Ontario Country Music Association: Rising Star, Female Vocalist, Group or Duo, Single, 1998
- RPM Big Country Awards: Rising Star 1998
- RPM Big Country Awards: Group of The Year (with Lace) 1999
- OCPHA: Group of the Year (with Lace) – 2002, 2000
- OCPHA: Vocal Collaboration (with Steve Fox – Couple on the Cake) 2002
