= There's a Song in There Somewhere =

Single by Thomas Wade & Wayward

from the album Thomas Wade & Wayward
- Released: 1997
- Genre: Country
- Length: 3:58
- Label: Peg
- Songwriters: Thomas Wade; Ken Harnden
- Producers: Joey May; Thomas Wade

Thomas Wade & Wayward singles chronology
"She's Getting Serious" (1997)	"There's a Song in There Somewhere" (1997)	"I Read Lips" (1998)

"There's a Song in there Somewhere" is a song recorded by Canadian country music group Thomas Wade & Wayward. It was released in 1997 as the fifth single from their debut album, Thomas Wade & Wayward. It peaked at number 12 on the RPM Country Tracks chart in January 1998.

== Chart performance ==
Chart (1997–1998)	Peak position
Canada Country Singles (RPM)	12

=== Year-end charts ===
Chart (1998)	Position
Canada Country Tracks (RPM)	96
