= Has Anybody Seen My Angel =

Single by Denise Murray

from the album What You Mean to Me
- Released: 1997
- Genre: Country
- Length: 3:52
- Label: Loggerhead
- Songwriters: Denise Murray; Claude Melanson; Lang; Bill Szawlowski
- Producer: Bill Szawlowski

Denise Murray singles chronology
"What's It Gonna Take" (1997)	"Has Anybody Seen My Angel" (1997)	"Love You Too Much" (1998)

"Has Anybody Seen My Angel" is a song recorded by Canadian country music artist Denise Murray. It was released in 1997 as the second single from her debut album, What You Mean to Me. It peaked at number 10 on the RPM Country Tracks chart in February 1998.

== Chart performance ==
Chart (1997–1998)	Peak position
Canada Country Singles (RPM)	10

=== Year-end charts ===
Chart (1998)	Position
Canada Country Tracks (RPM)	100
