= Lisa Zbitnew =

- Occupation: Entertainment Executive
- Known for: Owner of The Phoenix Concert Theatre and The Bronson Centre Music Theatre.

Lisa Zbitnew is the CEO of Bandwidth Music and Marketing as well as President and Owner/Operator of the Phoenix Concert Theatre in Toronto and the Bronson Centre Music Theatre in Ottawa. She was the CEO of War Child North America from 2008 to 2011. Zbitnew was the president and CEO of Sony BMG Music Canada from the original merger in September 2004 until January 2007. She served as President of BMG Music Canada beginning in 1996 where she reported to Tim Bowen, who oversaw Sony BMG's operations in the U.K, Canada, Australia, New Zealand and South Africa. She was the first female executive to hold the position of a major record label president in Canada.

Zbitnew has had a longstanding career in the Canadian music industry, beginning in as Managing Director of Alert Records, one of Canada's most successful independent labels. In 1990, she joined Sony Music Canada/CBS Records Canada as Marketing Director until 1993 when she became Vice President of Marketing at EMI Music Canada until 1996.

From 2009 to 2010 she was the chief executive officer of the Canadian arm of the global children's charity, War Child Canada, an organization she was supportive of while at Sony BMG Music Canada. Zbitnew took over the Phoenix Concert Theatre in September 2014, where she continues to serve as President and Owner/Operator. Most recently, she and her partners reopened the Bronson Centre Music Theatre in Ottawa, a fully renovated 1000 capacity live music venue, which also serves as a social enterprise.

Zbitnew has also supported the Unison Benevolent Fund, an emergency relief foundation that assists members of the music community in need of financial support.
