= I Read Lips =

Single by Thomas Wade & Wayward

from the album Thomas Wade & Wayward
- Released: 1998
- Genre: Country
- Length: 2:53
- Label: Peg
- Songwriters: Thomas Wade; Cyril Rawson
- Producers: Joey May; Thomas Wade

Thomas Wade & Wayward singles chronology
"There's a Song in There Somewhere" (1997)	"I Read Lips" (1998)	"For Better or Worse" (1998)

"I Read Lips" is a song recorded by Canadian country music group Thomas Wade & Wayward. It was released in 1998 as the sixth single from their debut album, Thomas Wade & Wayward. It peaked at number 12 on the RPM Country Tracks chart in June 1998.

== Chart performance ==
Chart (1998)	Peak position
Canada Country Singles (RPM)	12

=== Year-end charts ===
Chart (1998)	Position
Canada Country Tracks (RPM)	70
