= Falling (Bruce Guthro song) =

Single by Bruce Guthro

from the album Of Your Son
- Released: 1998
- Genre: Country, pop
- Length: 4:13
- Label: EMI
- Songwriter: Bruce Guthro
- Producer: Chad Irschick

Bruce Guthro singles chronology
"Walk This Road" (1997)	"Falling" (1998)	"Ivey's Wall" (1998)

"Falling" is a song written and recorded by Canadian singer-songwriter Bruce Guthro. It was released in 1998 as the second single from his second studio album, Of Your Son. The song peaked at number 15 on the RPM Country Tracks and number 12 on the RPM Adult Contemporary Tracks chart. It also peaked at number 39 on the RPM Top Singles chart.

== Music video ==
A music video was produced, which included scenes along the GO Transit Lakeshore East line and Durham College Oshawa GO Station. It is an edited version from its original song track.

== Chart performance ==
Chart (1998)	Peak position
Canada Top Singles (RPM)	39
Canada Adult Contemporary (RPM)	12
Canada Country Singles (RPM)	15

=== Year-end charts ===
Chart (1998)	Position
Canada Adult Contemporary Tracks (RPM)	65
Canada Country Tracks (RPM)	97
