= Billy Hoffman =

American country music singer

- Born: Billy Ray Hoffman; Arkansas
- Genres: Country
- Occupation: Singer
- Instruments: Vocals, guitar
- Years active: 2000–2002
- Label: Critter

Billy Ray Hoffman is an American country music singer and songwriter. He released one album, All I Wanted Was You, in 2000. This album charted the singles "Perfect Night" and "You're the Ticket".

== Biography ==
Billy Ray Hoffman was born in Arkansas and raised in Poteau, Oklahoma. He was born with a hearing problem and is only three percent away from being deaf. He also learned to play guitar to gain dexterity after being born with underdeveloped hands.

In 2000, he was the first artist signed to Critter Records, which was managed by Joe Stampley. Stampley produced Hoffman's debut album, which included a cover of Paul Davis' "I Go Crazy." Two singles from the album charted on the Billboard Hot Country Singles & Tracks chart. The album received a mixed review from Ray Waddell of Billboard, who wrote that "while lacking the vocal gymnastics heard in much of what populates current country radio, Hoffman's easygoing style mostly serves this material well." Hoffman retired from the music business after his first album and moved back to Poteau to focus on various business ventures.

== Discography ==
=== All I Wanted Was You (2000) ===
All I Wanted Was You

Studio album by Billy Hoffman
- Released: July 11, 2000
- Genre: Country
- Label: Critter
- Producer: Joe Stampley

==== Track listing ====
1. "All I Wanted Was You" (Jon Bon Jovi) - 4:01
2. "I Go Crazy" (Paul Davis) - 4:42
3. "Destination Unknown" (Tom Botkin, Les Rawlins, Donnie Skaggs) - 3:22
4. "Crossing Fences" (Botkin, Toni Dae, Elliott James) - 3:56
5. "It Just Hurts a Little" (Botkin, Skaggs, Hoffman) - 3:40
6. "You're the Ticket" (Jess Brown, Wade Kirby, Keith Follesé) - 2:37
7. "One Bad Habit" (Tony Stampley, Hoffman) - 3:24
8. "Perfect Night" (Stampley, Dae) - 3:25
9. "You Call That a Mountain" (Michael Garvin, Bucky Jones) - 3:25
10. "Saved by a Southern Belle" (Marv Green, Trey Bruce) - 3:12

==== Personnel ====
From All I Wanted Was You liner notes.

- Larry Beaird - acoustic guitar
- Dennis Burnside - piano, organ
- Mike Chapman - bass guitar
- J. T. Corenflos - lead guitar
- Jeffrey C. King - lead guitar
- Tammy Pierce - background vocals
- John Wesley Ryles - background vocals
- Scott Sanders - steel guitar
- Milton Sledge - drums
- Joe Spivey - fiddle, mandolin
- Joe Stampley - producer
- Jamie Tate - engineering

=== Singles ===
Year	Single	Peak positions	Album
Year	Single	US Country	Album
2000	"Perfect Night"	69	All I Wanted Was You
2000	"You're the Ticket"	75	All I Wanted Was You
2001	"All I Wanted Was You"	—	All I Wanted Was You
2002	"It Just Hurts a Little"	—	All I Wanted Was You
2002	"Bar Room Athlete"	—	—N/a
"—" denotes releases that did not chart

=== Music videos ===
Year	Video	Director
2000	"You're the Ticket"	
2001	"All I Wanted Was You"	J.R. Davis
2002	"Bar Room Athlete"	
2002	"It Just Hurts a Little"	Jeff Moseley
