= Ken Munshaw =

Canadian country singer/songwriter

- Also known as: Kenny Munshaw
- Origin: Toronto, Ontario, Canada
- Genres: Country
- Occupation(s): Singer, songwriter
- Instrument(s): Vocals, piano
- Years active: 1995-present
- Labels: Duke Street; AKA/EMI
- Website: www.kennymunshaw.com

Ken Munshaw is a Canadian country singer/songwriter. Munshaw has released three studio albums, Human Condition (1995), Time Tells All (2006) and Short Stories (2008). He has charted four chart singles on the Canadian country music charts, of which the highest was the No. 17-peaking "Let's Kiss and Make Up," a duet with Beverley Mahood.

== Discography ==
=== Albums ===
Year	Title	Label
1995	Human Condition	Duke Street
2006	Time Tells All	AKA/EMI
2008	Short Stories	AKA/EMI

=== Singles ===
Year	Single	CAN Country	Album
1995	"Sun Comes Up"	26	Human Condition
1996	"Danville Line"	49	Human Condition
1996	"Ain't It Funny"	73	Human Condition
1996	"Thunder and Lightning"	—	Human Condition
1997	"Kiss the Fish"	—	Get the Net
2008	"I Wish"	*	Short Stories

=== Guest singles ===
Year	Single	Artist	CAN Country	Album
1998	"Let's Kiss and Make Up"	Beverley Mahood	17	Girl Out of the Ordinary
