= Denise Murray =

Canadian female country music singer (1964-2020)

- Born: March 8, 1964; Toronto, Ontario, Canada
- Origin: Moncton, New Brunswick, Canada
- Died: September 15, 2020 (aged 56); Dieppe, New Brunswick, Canada
- Genres: Country
- Occupation: singer-songwriter
- Instrument: Vocals
- Years active: 1997–2001
- Labels: Loggerhead

Denise Murray (March 8, 1964 - September 15, 2020) was a Canadian female country music singer. Signed to Loggerhead Records in 1997, Murray released her debut album, What You Mean to Me, which included the top ten hit "Has Anybody Seen My Angel", which reached No. 10 on the RPM Country Tracks chart in Canada. The success of the album led to nominations from the Canadian Country Music Association and the RPM Big Country Awards. A second album for Loggerhead, Under the Moon, followed in 2000 and included the top 25 hit "Boom", which reached No. 25 on the RPM Country Tracks chart in 2000. Murray died from cancer at the age of 56 on September 15, 2020.

== Discography ==
=== Albums ===
Title	Details
What You Mean to Me	Release date: 1997; Label: Loggerhead
Under the Moon	Release date: August 1, 2000; Label: Loggerhead

=== Singles ===
Year	Single	Peak positions	Album
Year	Single	CAN Country	Album
1997	"What's It Gonna Take"	19	What You Mean to Me
1997	"Has Anybody Seen My Angel"	10	What You Mean to Me
1998	"Love You Too Much"	30	What You Mean to Me
1999	"Boom"	25	Under the Moon
2000	"Those Were the Days"	33	Under the Moon
2000	"For a While"	*	Under the Moon
2001	"Thing Called Love"	*	Under the Moon
2001	"Not So Fast"	*	Under the Moon
* denotes unknown peak positions

=== Music videos ===
Year	Video	Director
1997	"What's It Gonna Take"	
1997	"Has Anybody Seen My Angel"	
1998	"Love You Too Much"	
1999	"Boom"	Warren P. Sonoda
2000	"Those Were the Days"	Warren P. Sonoda
