= Of Your Son =

Studio album by Bruce Guthro
- Released: January 27, 1998
- Genre: Country/Folk
- Length: 53:32
- Label: EMI
- Producer: Steve MacKinnon

Bruce Guthro chronology
Sails to the Wind (1994)	Of Your Son (1998)	Guthro (2001)

Of Your Son is the 1998 second album of the Canadian artist Bruce Guthro. The album produced the singles "Walk This Road", "Falling", "Ivey's Wall", "Two Story House", "Good Love", and "Love Lives On". The album is credited for launching Guthro into the mainstream music scene.

== Track listing ==
1. "Falling" – 4:13
2. "Hobo Train" – 4:46
3. "Ivey's Wall" – 4:45
4. "Little Gifts" – 2:55
5. "Dirty Money" – 4:07
6. "Fallen Angel" – 4:22
7. "Walk This Road" – 3:21
8. "Love Lives On" – 3:13
9. "Two Story House" (with Amy Sky) – 4:39
10. "Forbidden" – 5:18
11. "Friends" – 3:41
12. "Good Love" – 3:29
13. "Falling (original version)" – 6:43

== Chart performance ==
Chart (1998)	Peak position
Canadian RPM Country Albums	6
