= Walk This Road (song) =

Single by Bruce Guthro

from the album Of Your Son
- Released: 1997
- Genre: Country
- Length: 3:21
- Label: EMI
- Songwriter: Bruce Guthro
- Producer: Chad Irschick

Bruce Guthro singles chronology
"Walk This Road" (1997)	"Falling" (1998)

"Walk This Road" is a single by Canadian folk music artist Bruce Guthro. Released in 1997, it was the first single from Guthro's Of Your Son album. The song reached #1 on the RPM Country Tracks chart in February 1998 and also reached #16 on the RPM Adult Contemporary Tracks chart.

== Chart performance ==
Chart (1997–1998)	Peak position
Canada Adult Contemporary (RPM)	16
Canada Country Singles (RPM)	1

=== Year-end charts ===
Chart (1998)	Position
Canada Adult Contemporary Tracks (RPM)	96
Canada Country Tracks (RPM)	11
