= Montana Sky (band) =

Canadian country music group

- Origin: Lindsay, Ontario, Canada
- Genres: Country
- Years active: 1992-present
- Label: Montana Sky
- Members: Larry MacDonald; Keith Kirkpatrick; Tim Lee; Darren Bailey; Rick Wigle
- Past members: Ron Goodacre, Tom Evans, Charles Kyte
- Website: www.montanaskyband.ca

Montana Sky is a Canadian country music group. Their 1997 single "Underneath the Moon" reached the Top 20 of the RPM Country Tracks chart. They later returned to the Top 20 with their 1998 single "A Whole Lot of Love." After disbanding for several years, founding members Larry MacDonald, Keith Kirkpatrick and Tim Lee reunited in 2009 with new members Darren Bailey and Rick Wigle.

The band returned to the studio in late 2011 to begin recording the album "Full Circle," the first with new members Darren Bailey and Rick Wigle. "Full Circle" was released in January 2013 and is available on iTunes.

Larry MacDonald is the son of Boyd and Shirley MacDonald who named "Stompin Tom Connors."

== Discography ==
=== Albums ===
| Year | Album |
|---|---|
| 1994 | Montana Sky |
| 1998 | Underneath the Moon |
| 2012 | Full Circle |

=== Singles ===
| Year | Single | CAN Country | Album |
|---|---|---|---|
| 1997 | "Heat of the Night" | 45 | Montana Sky |
| 1997 | "Underneath the Moon" | 18 | Montana Sky |
| 1998 | "A Whole Lot of Love" | 19 | Montana Sky |
| 1998 | "Long Hard Ride" | 38 | Underneath the Moon |
| 2013 | "Cousin Mary" | | Full Circle |
