= Radio 101 (song) =

Single by Beverley Mahood

from the album Girl Out of the Ordinary
- Released: 1998
- Genre: Country
- Length: 3:17
- Label: Spin
- Songwriters: Beverley Mahood; Gary O'Connor
- Producer: J. Richard Hutt

Beverley Mahood singles chronology
"Let's Kiss and Make Up" (1998)	"Radio 101" (1998)	"I Love How You Listen to Me" (1999)

"Radio 101" is a song recorded by Canadian country music artist Beverley Mahood. It was released in 1998 as the fourth single from her debut album, Girl Out of the Ordinary. It peaked at number 17 on the RPM Country Tracks chart in October 1998.

== Chart performance ==
Chart (1998)	Peak position
Canada Country Singles (RPM)	17

=== Year-end charts ===
Chart (1998)	Position
Canada Country Tracks (RPM)	98
