= What If I Said =

Single by Anita Cochran with Steve Wariner

from the album Back to You
- B-side: "Daddy Can You See Me"
- Released: November 3, 1997
- Genre: Country
- Length: 4:52 (album version); 4:22 (single edit)
- Label: Warner Bros. Nashville
- Songwriter: Anita Cochran
- Producers: Anita Cochran; Jim Ed Norman

Anita Cochran singles chronology
"Daddy Can You See Me" (1997)	"What If I Said" (1997)	"Will You Be Here" (1998)

Steve Wariner singles chronology
"Get Back" (1995)	"What If I Said" (1997)	"Holes in the Floor of Heaven" (1998)

"What If I Said" is a song written and recorded by American country music artist Anita Cochran as a duet with Steve Wariner. The single was released in November 1997 as was Cochran's only No. 1 single on the U.S. Billboard Hot Country Singles & Tracks chart, as well as her only Top 40 single on that chart. In addition, the song was Wariner's first chart entry in three years, as well as his first No. 1 since 1989's "I Got Dreams." The song was nominated by the Country Music Association for Vocal Duet of the Year in 1998.

"What If I Said" can be found on Cochran's 1997 album Back to You, as well as Wariner's 1998 album Burnin' the Roadhouse Down.

== Content ==
The song is a ballad with Cochran and Wariner portraying two characters who are in unsatisfying relationships with other people, but express their feelings for each other.

It is in the key of C major with a primary chord pattern of C9-Dm7♭5 and an approximate tempo of 60 beats per minute.

== Personnel ==
From Back to You liner notes.

Musicians

- Anita Cochran - vocals
- Eddie Bayers - drums
- Eric Darken - percussion
- Paul Franklin - steel guitar
- Nashville String Machine - strings
- Steve Nathan - piano
- Don Potter - acoustic guitar
- Brent Rowan - electric guitar
- Steve Wariner - vocals
- Willie Weeks - bass guitar

== Music video ==
The music video was directed by Jim Shea and premiered in 1997.

== Chart positions ==
Chart (1997–1998)	Peak position
Canada Country Singles (RPM)	1
US Billboard Hot 100	59
US Hot Country Songs (Billboard)	1

=== Year-end charts ===
Chart (1998)	Position
Canada Country Tracks (RPM)	47
US Country Songs (Billboard)	22
