= Anita Cochran =

American country music singer, songwriter and guitarist (born 1967)

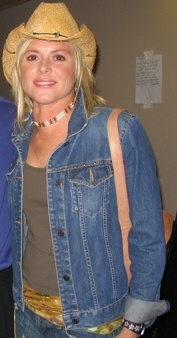
- Anita Cochran in 2009

Background information
- Born: Anita Renee Cockerham; February 6, 1967 (age 58)
- Origin: South Lyon, Michigan, United States
- Genres: Country
- Occupations: Singer-songwriter, record producer
- Instruments: Vocals, guitar, dobro, banjo, mandolin
- Years active: 1997–present
- Labels: Warner Bros. Nashville, Straybranch

Anita Renee Cockerham (born February 6, 1967), known professionally as Anita Cochran, is an American country music singer, songwriter, and guitarist. She has released two albums for Warner Bros. Records Nashville and one for Straybranch Records. Cochran is best known for her late 1997-early 1998 single "What If I Said", a duet with Steve Wariner that reached the number-one position on the Billboard Hot Country Songs charts.

== Biography ==
Anita Cochran was born in South Lyon, Michigan, into a family that enjoyed listening to country music. She began to play guitar at an early age, and later learned to play banjo, mandolin and Dobro as well. A local country musician, Anita's father often took her to country music festivals. She later found work both in bands and as a solo act, and was eventually hired to manage Pearl Recording Studios, a studio in Canton, Michigan.

In 1997, after moving to Nashville, Tennessee, she was signed to Warner Bros. Records. Released in 1997, her debut album, Back to You, was produced by her as well. She co-wrote all but one of the album's songs and played several instruments on it. The album's lead-off single, "I Could Love a Man Like That", peaked at No. 64, followed by the No. 69 "Daddy, Can You See Me". The third single, a duet with Steve Wariner titled "What If I Said", reached the top of the U.S. Billboard Hot Country Singles & Tracks charts in early 1998. Following this song was the album's fourth and final single, "Will You Be Here?" also at No. 69. Her second album, Anita, produced three singles, all of which failed to reach the top 40.

For the first single from her third album, God Created Woman, Cochran spliced in Conway Twitty's vocals from earlier songs of his to form a duet entitled "(I Wanna Hear) A Cheatin' Song". This song peaked at No. 57; the album was never released.

In 2007, Cochran produced country music singer Tammy Cochran's album Where I Am. The two singers are not related.

Cochran was diagnosed with breast cancer in late 2017. In 2018, several artists gathered to hold a benefit concert for her.

== Discography ==
=== Studio albums ===
Title	Album details	Peak chart positions		
Title	Album details	US Country	US	US Heat
Back to You	Release date: April 22, 1997; Label: Warner Bros. Nashville	24	173	9
Anita	Release date: October 5, 1999; Label: Warner Bros. Nashville	—	—	—
Serenity	Release date: November 10, 2009; Label: Straybranch Records	—	—	—
"—" denotes releases that did not chart

=== Singles ===
Year	Single	Peak chart positions			Album
Year	Single	US Country	US	CAN Country	Album
1997	"I Could Love a Man Like That"	64	—	—	Back to You
1997	"Daddy Can You See Me"	69	—	—	Back to You
1997	"What If I Said" (with Steve Wariner)	1	59	1	Back to You
1998	"Will You Be Here?"	69	—	—	Back to You
1999	"For Crying Out Loud"	58	—	93	Anita
2000	"Good Times"	50	—	—	Anita
2000	"You With Me"	61	—	—	Anita
2004	"(I Wanna Hear) A Cheatin' Song" (with Conway Twitty)	57	—	—	God Created Woman (unreleased)
2004	"God Created Woman"	—	—	—	God Created Woman (unreleased)
2018	"Fight Like a Girl"	—	—	—	Non-album single
"—" denotes releases that did not chart

=== Music Videos ===
Year	Video	Director
1997	"I Could Love a Man Like That"	Michael Salomon
1997	"Daddy Can You See Me"	Jim Shea
1997	"What If I Said" (with Steve Wariner)	Jim Shea
1999	"For Crying Out Loud"	Thom Oliphant
2000	"Good Times"	Gerry Wenner/Frank Scarpaci
2000	"You With Me"	Jim Shea
2003	"Destiny's Song" (With Deborah Allen & Tammy Cochran)	
2004	"(I Wanna Hear) A Cheatin' Song"	
2018	"Fight Like A Girl"	
