= Vik Recordings =

ViK. Recordings
- Parent company: BMG Music Canada
- Founded: 1998
- Founder: Lisa Zbitnew
- Defunct: 2004
- Genre: Various
- Country of origin: Canada

Vik Recordings was a Canadian record label established in 1998, shortly after Lisa Zbitnew became president of the Canadian branch of BMG Music, at that time the parent company of RCA Records. Its notable artists included: McMaster & James, Tom Green, Treble Charger, Jacksoul, Shawn Desman, Rascalz and Keshia Chanté. Following the merger of BMG and Sony in 2004, The Vik label was dissolved and most of its roster was absorbed by Sony/BMG Music Canada, after Lisa Zbitnew was appointed President and CEO of Sony/BMG Music Canada the same year.

Vic Recordings was a subsidiary of BMG Music Canada.

== See also ==
- List of record labels
