= Rodney Crowell discography =

American country music artist discography

- Studio albums: 17
- Compilation albums: 7
- Singles: 39
- Music videos: 16
- No. 1 singles (US & Canada): 6

The discography of Rodney Crowell, an American country music artist, consists of 17 studio albums and 39 singles. Although he first charted on Hot Country Songs in 1978, he did not reach top 40 on that chart until 1981, with "Stars on the Water". His 1988 album Diamonds & Dirt produced five consecutive number-one singles, the only ones of his career.

== Studio albums ==
=== 1970s–1980s ===
Title	Album details	Peak positions				Certifications
Title	Album details	US Country	US	AUS	CAN Country	Certifications
Ain't Living Long Like This	Release date: 1978; Label: Warner Bros.	—	—	—	—	
But What Will the Neighbors Think	Release date: 1980; Label: Warner Bros.	64	155	—	—	
Rodney Crowell	Release date: 1981; Label: Warner Bros.	47	105	63	—	
Street Language	Release date: 1986; label: Columbia	38	177	—	—	
Diamonds & Dirt	Release date: March 30, 1988; Label: Columbia	8	—	—	9	CAN: Gold; US: Gold
Keys to the Highway	Release date: October 10, 1989; Label: Columbia	15	180	—	—	
"—" denotes releases that did not chart

=== 1990s–2000s ===
Title	Album details	Peak positions				
Title	Album details	US Country	US	US Heat	US Indie	CAN Country
Life Is Messy	Release date: May 19, 1992; Label: Columbia	30	155	—	—	9
Let the Picture Paint Itself	Release date: May 10, 1994; Label: MCA	—	—	—	—	—
Jewel of the South	Release date: June 20, 1995; Label: MCA	—	—	—	—	—
The Houston Kid	Release date: February 13, 2001; Label: Sugar Hill	32	—	—	19	—
Fate's Right Hand	Release date: July 29, 2003; Label: DMZ / Epic	29	—	14	—	—
The Outsider	Release date: August 16, 2005; Label: Columbia	37	—	12	—	—
Sex & Gasoline	Release date: September 2, 2008; Label: Yep Roc	38	—	—	35	—
"—" denotes releases that did not chart

=== 2010s–2020s ===
Title	Album details	Peak positions			Sales
Title	Album details	US Country	US	US Indie	Sales
Kin: Songs by Mary Karr & Rodney Crowell	Release date: June 5, 2012; Label: Vanguard	32	—	37	
Old Yellow Moon (with Emmylou Harris)	Release date: February 26, 2013; Label: Nonesuch	4	29	—	
Tarpaper Sky	Release date: April 15, 2014; Label: New West	25	168	32	
The Traveling Kind (with Emmylou Harris)	Release date: May 12, 2015; Label: Nonesuch	8	78	—	
Close Ties	Release date: March 31, 2017; Label: New West	28	138	—	US: 11,600
Acoustic Classics	Release date: July 13, 2018; Label: RC1	—	—	—	
Christmas Everywhere	Release date: November 2, 2018; Label: New West	—	—	—	US: 1,700
Texas	Release date: August 15, 2019; Label: RC1	— (Note: Texas did not enter Top Country Albums, but peaked at number 3 on Country Album Sales.)	— (Note: Texas did not enter the Billboard 200, but peaked at number 36 on Top Current Album Sales.)	13	US: 9,400
Triage	Release date: July 23, 2021; Label: RC1	—	— (Note: Triage did not enter the Billboard 200, but peaked at number 30 on Top Current Album Sales.)	—	
The Chicago Sessions	Release date: May 5, 2023; Label: New West	—	—	—	
Airline Highway	Release date: August 29, 2025; Label: New West	—	—	—	
Then Again (Recorded 2006)	Release date: June 26, 2026; Label: New West	—	—	—	
"—" denotes releases that did not chart

== Compilation albums ==
Title	Album details	Peak positions
Title	Album details	US Country
The Rodney Crowell Collection	Release date: August 8, 1989; Label: Warner Bros.	65
Greatest Hits	Release date: November 2, 1993; Label: Columbia	—
Soul Searchin'	Release date: December 1, 1995; Label: Sony Music Special Products	—
Super Hits	Release date: 1995; Label: Columbia	—
The Essential Rodney Crowell	Release date: November 16, 2004; Label: Columbia / Legacy	—
The Platinum Collection	Release date: June 26, 2006; Label: Rhino	—
Playlist: The Very Best of Rodney Crowell	Release date: May 29, 2012; Label: Columbia / Legacy	—
"—" denotes releases that did not chart

== Singles ==
=== 1970s–1980s ===
Year	Single	Peak positions					Album
Year	Single	US Country	US	US AC	AUS	CAN Country	Album
1978	"Elvira"	95	—	—	—	—	Ain't Living Long Like This
1978	"Song for the Life"	—	—	—	—	—	Ain't Living Long Like This
1979	"(Now and Then There's) A Fool Such as I"	90	—	—	—	—	Ain't Living Long Like This
1980	"Ashes by Now"	78	37	46	—	—	But What Will the Neighbors Think
1980	"Ain't No Money"	—	—	—	—	—	But What Will the Neighbors Think
1980	"Here Comes the 80's"	—	—	—	—	—	But What Will the Neighbors Think
1981	"Stars on the Water"	30	— (Note: "Stars on the Water" did not enter the Billboard Hot 100, but peaked at number 5 on the Bubbling Under Hot 100 Singles chart.)	—	39	21	Rodney Crowell
1982	"Victim or a Fool"	34	—	—	—	—	Rodney Crowell
1986	"Let Freedom Ring"	—	—	—	—	—	Street Language
1986	"When I'm Free Again"	38	—	—	—	—	Street Language
1987	"She Loves the Jerk"	71	—	—	—	—	Street Language
1987	"Looking for You"	59	—	—	—	—	Street Language
1988	"It's Such a Small World" (with Rosanne Cash)	1	—	—	—	1	Diamonds & Dirt
1988	"I Couldn't Leave You If I Tried"	1	—	—	—	1	Diamonds & Dirt
1988	"She's Crazy for Leavin'"	1	—	—	—	1	Diamonds & Dirt
1989	"After All This Time"	1	—	—	—	1	Diamonds & Dirt
1989	"Above and Beyond"	1	—	—	—	1	Diamonds & Dirt
1989	"Many a Long & Lonesome Highway"	3	—	—	—	1	Keys to the Highway
"—" denotes releases that did not chart

=== 1990s ===
Year	Single	Peak positions					Album
Year	Single	US Country	US AC	CAN Country	CAN	CAN AC	Album
1990	"If Looks Could Kill"	6	—	4	—	—	Keys to the Highway
1990	"My Past Is Present"	22	—	12	—	—	Keys to the Highway
1990	"Now That We're Alone"	17	—	13	—	—	Keys to the Highway
1991	"Things I Wish I'd Said"	72	—	—	—	—	Keys to the Highway
1992	"Lovin' All Night"	10	—	9	—	—	Life Is Messy
1992	"What Kind of Love"	11	9	2	47	5	Life Is Messy
1992	"It's Not for Me to Judge"	—	—	—	—	—	Life Is Messy
1992	"Let's Make Trouble"	—	—	78	—	—	Life Is Messy
1993	"Even Cowgirls Get the Blues"	—	—	—	—	—	Greatest Hits
1994	"Let the Picture Paint Itself"	60	—	50	—	—	Let the Picture Paint Itself
1994	"Big Heart"	75	—	70	—	—	Let the Picture Paint Itself
1994	"I Don't Fall in Love So Easy"	—	—	—	—	—	Let the Picture Paint Itself
1995	"Please Remember Me"	69	—	—	—	—	Jewel of the South
1998	"I Walk the Line Revisited" (with Johnny Cash)	61	—	—	—	—	The Houston Kid
"—" denotes releases that did not chart

=== 2000s–2020s ===
Year	Single	Peak positions	Album
Year	Single	US Country	Album
2001	"I Walk the Line Revisited" (with Johnny Cash; re-issue)	—	The Houston Kid
2001	"Why Don't We Talk About It"	—	The Houston Kid
2003	"Fate's Right Hand"	—	Fate's Right Hand
2003	"Earthbound"	60	Fate's Right Hand
2005	"The Obscenity Prayer (Give It to Me)"	—	The Outsider
2006	"Say You Love Me"	—	The Outsider
2008	"Sex and Gasoline"	—	Sex and Gasoline
2012	"I'm a Mess"	—	Kin: Songs by Mary Karr & Rodney Crowell
2017	"It Ain't Over Yet" (featuring Rosanne Cash and John Paul White)	—	Close Ties
2017	"Tobacco Road"	—	A Tribute to John D. Loudermilk
2018	"Shake Your Money Maker"	—	Strange Angels: In Flight with Elmore James
2019	"Flatland Hillbillies" (featuring Randy Rogers and Lee Ann Womack)	—	Texas
2021	"Something Has to Change"	—	Non-album single
2025	"Mr. Soul"	—	The Songs of Neil Young, Vol. 1
"—" denotes releases that did not chart

=== As featured artist ===
Year	Single	Album
2011	"Hard Time Movin' On" (David Bradley featuring Rodney Crowell)	Movin' On

=== Other appearances ===
Year	Song	Album
2018	"World So Full of Love"	King of the Road: A Tribute to Roger Miller

== Music videos ==
Year	Title	Director
1986	"Let Freedom Ring"	David Hogan
1988	"It's Such a Small World" (with Rosanne Cash)	Edd Griles
1988	"I Couldn't Leave You If I Tried"	Bill Pope
1989	"After All This Time"	Bill Pope
1989	"Many a Long and Lonesome Highway"	Bill Pope
1990	"If Looks Could Kill"	Wayne Miller
1991	"Things I Wish I'd Said"	
1992	"Lovin' All Night"	Joanne Gardner
1993	"Even Cowgirls Get the Blues"	Joanne Gardner
1994	"Let the Picture Paint Itself"	Gerry Wenner
1994	"Big Heart"	Joanne Gardner/Steven Goldmann
1995	"Please Remember Me"	Bud Schaetzle
2000	"I Walk the Line Revisited" (with Johnny Cash)	Hannah Crowell/Stephen McCord/Dawn Nepp
2003	"Earthbound"	Nigel Dick
2003	"Fate's Right Hand"	Deb Haus/Jerad Sloan
2008	"Sex and Gasoline"	
2016	"It Ain't Over Yet" (with Rosanne Cash, John Paul White and Mickey Raphael)	
2017	"Nashville 1972"	Reid Long

== See also ==
- The Notorious Cherry Bombs
