= Hank DeVito discography =

Hank DeVito is an American musician and songwriter. In addition to his recordings with Emmylou Harris and the Hot Band and the Notorious Cherry Bombs, he has been featured as a performer and composer on many albums by other artists.

== As a member of New York Rock and Roll Ensemble ==
- 1971: Roll Over (Columbia)
- 1973: New York Rock (Atco)

== With Emmylou Harris ==
- 1976: Elite Hotel (Warner Bros.)
- 1977: Luxury Liner (Warner Bros.)
- 1978: Quarter Moon in a Ten Cent Town (Warner Bros.)
- 1979: Blue Kentucky Girl (Warner Bros.)
- 1979: Light of the Stable (Warner Bros.)
- 1980: Roses in the Snow (Warner Bros.)
- 1981: Cimarron (Warner Bros.)
- 1981: Evangeline (Warner Bros.)
- 1983: White Shoes (Warner Bros.)
- 1985: The Ballad of Sally Rose (Warner Bros.)

== As a member of the Notorious Cherry Bombs ==
- 2004: The Notorious Cherry Bombs (Universal South)

== As composer ==
=== 1979 - 1982 ===
- 1979: Waylon Jennings – What Goes Around Comes Around (RCA Victor) – track 10, "Old Love, New Eyes" (co-written with Rodney Crowell)
- 1979: Dave Edmunds – Repeat When Necessary (Swan Song) – track 4, "Sweet Little Lisa" (co-written with Donivan Cowart and Martin Cowart); track 6, "Queen of Hearts"
- 1980: Rodney Crowell – But What Will the Neighbors Think (Warner Bros.) – track 8, "Queen of Hearts"
- 1981: Dave Edmunds – Twangin... (Swan Song) – track 6, "Cheap Talk, Patter and Jive" (co-written with Donivan Cowart)
- 1981: Emmylou Harris – Cimarron (Warner Bros.) – track 10, "Tennessee Rose" (co-written with Karen Brooks)
- 1981: Rosanne Cash – Seven Year Ache (Columbia) – track 10, "I Can't Resist" (co-written with Rodney Crowell)
- 1981: Rodney Crowell – Rodney Crowell (Warner Bros.) – track 6, "Only Two Hearts" and track 8, "All You've Got to Do" (both co-written with Crowell)
- 1981: Juice Newton – Juice (Capitol) – track 4, "Queen of Hearts"
- 1982: Albert Lee – Albert Lee (Polydor) – track 1, "Sweet Little Lisa"; track 3, "On the Boulevard"; track 4, "The Best I Can" (co-written with Emory Gordy Jr. and Rodney Crowell); track 5, "Rock 'N' Roll Man"
- 1982: Sandy Posey – Tennessee Rose (51 West) – track 2, "Tennessee Rose" (co-written with Karen Brooks)

=== 1983 - present ===
- 1983: Sissy Spacek – Hangin' Up My Heart (Atlantic) – track 1, "Hangin' Up My Heart"
- 1983: Larry Willoughby – Building Bridges (Atlantic) – track 2, "Building Bridges" (co-written with Willoughby); track 10, "Sweet Little Lisa" (co-written with Donivan Cowart and Martin Cowart)
- 1985: Nicolette Larson – ...Say When (MCA) – track 3, "Building Bridges" (co-written with Larry Willoughby)
- 1986: Rodney Crowell – Street Language (Columbia) – track 9, "The Best I Can" (co-written with Emory Gordy, Jr. and Rodney Crowell)
- 1987: Rosanne Cash – King's Record Shop (Columbia) – track 3, "If You Change Your Mind" (co-written with Rosanne Cash)
- 1987: Dave Edmunds – I Hear You Rockin' (Columbia) – track 3, "Queen of Hearts"
- 1992: Del McCoury Band - Blue Side of Town (Rounder) - track 7, "The Blue Side of Town" (co-written with Paul Kennerley)
- 1993: Marty Brown - Wild Kentucky Skies (MCA) - track 2, "Let's Begin Again" (co-written with Danny Flowers)
- 2013: Emmylou Harris and Rodney Crowell – Old Yellow Moon (Nonesuch) – track 1, "Hanging Up My Heart"; track 6 "Black Caffeine" (co-written with Donivan Cowart); track 12, "Old Yellow Moon" (co-written with Lynn Langham)
- 1995: Rodney Crowell – Jewel of the South (MCA) – track 9, "Love To Burn" (co-written with Crowell and Will Jennings)
- 1999: Claudia Church – Claudia Church (Reprise) – track 6, "The Street of Nashville" (co-written with Rodney Crowell)
- 2005: Brooks & Dunn – Hillbilly Deluxe (Arista) – track 9, "Building Bridges" (co-written with Larry Willoughby)
- 2005: Melanie Laine – Time Flies (Royalty) – track 10, "Queen of Hearts"
- 2006: Guy Clark – Workbench Songs (Sugar Hill) – track 5, "Exposé" (co-written with Rodney Crowell)
- 2006: Lowen & Navarro – Hogging the Covers (Red Hen) – track 9, "Small Town Saturday Night" (co-written with Pat Alger)
- 2007: Reg McTaggart – Beyond the Reason (self-released) – track 1, "Wait a Minute" (co-written with Rodney Crowell)

== As producer ==
- 1986: Sweethearts of the Rodeo - Sweethearts Of The Rodeo (Columbia) with Steve Buckingham

== Also appears on ==
=== 1973 - 1979 ===
- 1973: McKendree Spring – Tracks (MCA)
- 1974: Felix Cavaliere – Felix Cavaliere (Bearsville)
- 1975: Jesse Colin Young – Songbird (Warner Bros.)
- 1976: Hoyt Axton – Fearless (A&M)
- 1976: Jonathan Edwards – Rockin' Chair (Reprise)
- 1976: Mary Kay Place – Tonite! At The Capri Lounge: Loretta Haggers (Columbia)
- 1977: Jesse Colin Young – Love On The Wing (Warner Bros.)
- 1977: Jonathan Edwards – Sailboat (Warner Bros.)
- 1977: Mary Kay Place - Aimin' to Please (Columbia)
- 1978: Rodney Crowell – Ain't Living Long Like This (Warner Bros.)
- 1979: George Jones – My Very Special Guests (Epic)
- 1979: Tim Krekel – Crazy Me (Capricorn)

=== 1980 - present ===
- 1980: Rosanne Cash – Right or Wrong (Columbia)
- 1980: Rodney Crowell – But What Will the Neighbors Think (Warner Bros.)
- 1980: Stevie Wonder – Hotter Than July (Tamla) – pedal steel on track 4, "I Ain't Gonna Stand For It"
- 1981: Rosanne Cash – Seven Year Ache (Columbia)
- 1981: Guy Clark - The South Coast of Texas (Warner Bros.)
- 1981: Rodney Crowell – Rodney Crowell (Warner Bros.)
- 1981: Arlo Guthrie – Power of Love (Warner Bros.) – steel guitar on track 8, "Jamaica Farewell"
- 1982: Jimmy Buffett – Somewhere Over China (MCA)
- 1983: Guy Clark - Better Days (Warner Bros.)
- 1983: Ricky Skaggs – Don't Cheat in Our Hometown (Sugar Hill)
- 1984: George Strait – Does Fort Worth Ever Cross Your Mind (MCA)
- 1986: Rodney Crowell - Street Language (Columbia)
- 1989: Rodney Crowell - Keys to the Highway (CBS)
- 1996: McKendree Spring - God Bless the Conspiracy (Edsel)
