= Keith Sykes (musician) =

American singer-songwriter

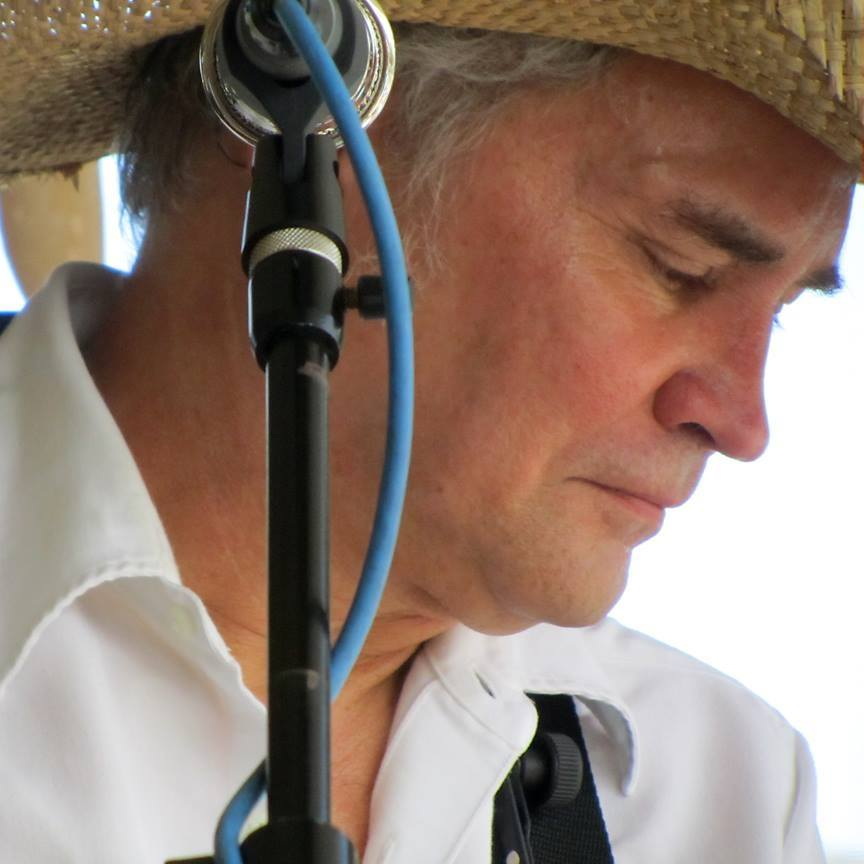

Background information
- Born: October 24, 1948 (age 76); Murray, Kentucky, U.S.
- Genres: Folk, Americana
- Occupation(s): Singer, songwriter
- Years active: 1968–present
- Labels: Vanguard, Midland, Backstreet, Memphis, Oh Boy, Syren, Aimless
- Website: keithsykes.com

Keith Sykes (born October 24, 1948) is an American singer-songwriter, musician, and record producer. More than 100 of Sykes' songs have been recorded by John Prine, Rosanne Cash, The Judds, Jerry Jeff Walker, and George Thorogood, although he may be best known for co-writing "Volcano", the title track of Jimmy Buffett's 1979 album.

Sykes has released at least fifteen albums including I'm Not Strange, I'm Just Like You, and It Don't Hurt to Flirt, His television debut was performing "B.I.G.T.I.M.E" as a musical guest on Saturday Night Live in 1980. He owns and operates a recording studio, The Woodshed, as well as a production company and several publishing companies. The RIAA has certified that recordings of his songs have sold more than 25 million copies worldwide.

== Career ==
=== 1960s–1970s and Jimmy Buffett ===
After hitchhiking to the Newport Folk Festival in 1967, Sykes saw Arlo Guthrie perform "Alice's Restaurant Massacree" and was inspired to pursue music as a full-time career. Sykes' first job in music was performing at a Holiday Inn in downtown Charleston, South Carolina after auditioning with "Alice's Restaurant Massacre". He continued to perform at Holiday Inns until August 1968, when he learned about the College Coffee House Circuit in New York. He auditioned, was accepted to perform, and moved to New York City. He toured colleges and coffeehouses across the U.S., playing about 75 dates a year. In New York Sykes met and befriended songwriters Jerry Jeff Walker, Emmylou Harris, John Prine, Kris Kristofferson, Gary White, and Loudon Wainwright III. Sykes signed with Vanguard Records, which released his first two albums, his debut self-titled album in 1970, and his second album 1-2-3 in 1972.

Occasionally visiting his management's office in Coconut Grove a neighborhood in Miami bordering Biscayne Bay. Sykes traveled from Coconut Grove to Key West in 1972. There he met singer-songwriter Jimmy Buffett and developed a friendship and career with him. Buffett recorded two songs from Sykes' third album The Way That I Feel for his 1978 certified-platinum album Son of a Son of a Sailor. In January 1979, Kris Kristofferson and Rita Coolidge asked Sykes to attend an event for UNICEF in New York City. It was there that Buffett asked Sykes to join his touring and recording band, The Coral Reefers. Sykes became the utility guitar player in The Coral Reefer Band for Buffett's 1979 tours, which included the Volcano Tour.^{[6]}

=== 1980s and Saturday Night Live ===
After recording the Volcano album in Montserrat in the Caribbean, Sykes recorded I'm Not Strange, I'm Just Like You, his third studio album, which was released by the independent label Memphis Records. After the album became a hit locally in 1980, Tom Petty's Backstreet Records released it. The song was on the Billboard charts for 11 weeks.^{[7]} Recorded at Ardent Studios in Memphis, I'm Not Strange includes "B.I.G.T.I.M.E.," which Sykes performed as the musical guest on Saturday Night Live and was recorded by George Thorogood.

In 1982 Backstreet Records released It Don't Hurt To Flirt, which featured the single "In Between Lies". The single did not hit and Sykes left the label. Sykes recorded two more albums on his own independent label Memphis Records, Play X Play (1983) and Fun Rockin' (1984).

Sykes stopped touring in 1986 in order to focus on writing, publishing, and producing. During that time, Sykes signed Memphis songwriter John Kilzer to his publishing company Keith Sykes Music. He was the driving force behind Kilzer's deal with Geffen Records. Sykes is also credited with the discovery of renowned singer-songwriter Todd Snider. After receiving a cassette tape from the young, then-unknown Snider in the mail, Sykes invited him to Memphis and was solely responsible for landing Snider his first recording contract on Margaritaville Records.

=== 1990s and Beale Street Songwriters Series ===
It's About Time was released in1992. It was Sykes' first solo album in close to a decade and became known as a "songwriter's record." The album was released on John Prine's independent record label Oh Boy Records and was followed by another year on the road. During the tour Sykes played Mountain Stage, Nashville Now, and many more shows with Prine.

In the fall of 1993, Sykes made a deal with the renowned publisher Carlin International and built The Woodshed Recording Studio. He recorded all his publishing company's demos there in addition to numerous indy albums and tracks. From 1993 to 2003, he hosted a popular songwriting series on Memphis' iconic Beale Street. The series showcased numerous acclaimed songwriters including folk icons Steve Earle and Guy Clark, Nashville Songwriters Hall of Fame writers Richard Leigh and Roger Cook, and then-newcomers Rivers Rutherford and Jimmy Davis.

Teaming up with Dallas businessman and investor Kelcy Warren in 1997, Sykes began to expand the work of his Woodshed recording studio and opened new publishing companies. The two formed a new label, Syren Records, which released Sykes' next two albums, rocker Advanced Medication for the Blues in 1998 and Americana-friendly Don't Count Us Out in 2001 which features duets with friends like Iris DeMent, John Prine, Rodney Crowell, and Susan Marshall.

=== 2000s – present ===
After opening a tour for Todd Snider in late 2000, Sykes was inspired to return to performing full-time, a move he has described as "the right move at the right time." He continued to write and record, releasing All I Know for MadJack Records' in 2004 and Let It Roll for Fat Pete Records in 2006. In 2008 Sykes released the album Country Morning Music, produced by Todd Snider and Peter Cooper. In 2011, Sykes' blues album, Bucksnort Blues, was released on KSM Entertainment. KSME released a "best-of" album in 2012 called 20 Most Requested featuring songs like a Prine co-write "You Got Gold," a heartfelt autobiographical ballad "Broken Home," and Jimmy Buffett hit "Volcano."

Known as a "troubadour of Trop Rock," Sykes released a six-song EP called Songs From A Little Beach Town in 2016; it is inspired by time that Sykes was in Port Aransas, Texas. The album was recorded in Nashville by engineer and producer Brent Maher (The Judds, Kenny Rogers, and Willie Nelson) and released in 2016. The single "Come As You Are Beach Bar" hit No. 1 on Radio A1A's TropRock Top 40 for seven weeks, and "The Best Day" was first on the charts in August 2016. It reached No. 3. "Coast of Marseilles" hit No. 1 on the Trop Rock Chart in February 2018.

Two of Sykes' co-writes, "Volcano" and "Coast of Marseilles," are featured in the 2018 Broadway musical "Escape to Margaritaville." The Tree of Forgiveness, John Prine's first album in 13 years, was released in 2018. The album contained "No Ordinary Blue", a song by Prine and Sykes written in the mold of "You Got Gold" and "Long Monday".

== Personal life ==
Born in Murray, Kentucky, Sykes grew up in Memphis, Tennessee. At 17 years old, he purchased his first guitar for $20 at a pawn shop on Memphis' famed Beale Street. After years of traveling, he eventually returned to Memphis and reconnect with his childhood crush, Jerene Rowe. They married in 1976 and currently live in Fayette County outside of Memphis.

== Filmography ==
Sykes made his acting debut as the lead character in the 1972 cult film Summer Soldiers, directed by Japanese avant-garde filmmaker Hiroshi Teshigahara (Woman in the Dunes). Set during the Vietnam War, the film depicts a Vietnam veteran (Sykes) who deserts from the US Army and is living on the fringe of Japanese society. Sykes filmed for nine weeks in Tokyo, Kyoto, Hiroshima, and other surrounding cities. The original Japanese title of the film is Samâ sorujâ.

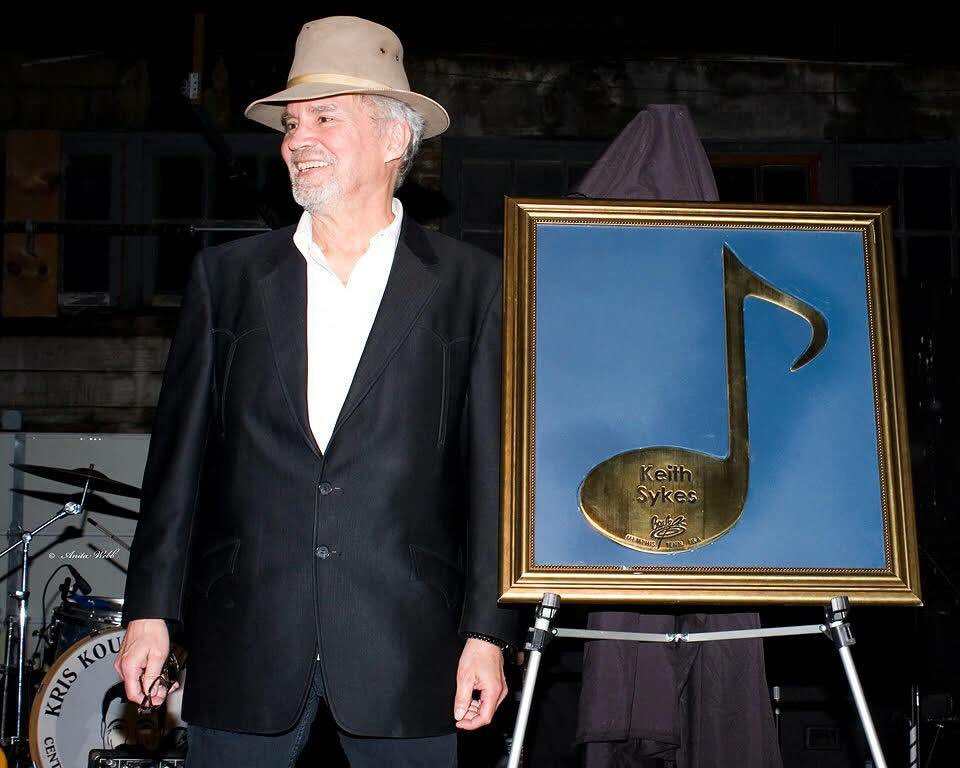
Sykes receiving a Brass Note on Beale Street's Walk of Fame, March 2016

In 2017, Sykes announced that he was writing a screenplay titled Horses & Me.

== Awards ==
Sykes was honored with a Brass Note on the Beale Street Walk of Fame in 2016.

== Discography ==
=== Studio albums ===
Year	Album	Chart Peak		Label
Year	Album	Billboard 200	Trop Rock 40	Label
1969	Keith Sykes			Vanguard Records
1970	1-2-3			Vanguard Records
1977	The Way That I Feel			Midland International Records
1980	I’m Not Strange, I’m Just Like You	147		Backstreet Records
1982	It Don't Hurt to Flirt			Backstreet Records
1983	Play X Play			Memphis Records
1984	Fun Rockin’			Memphis Records
1992	It's About Time			Oh Boy Records
1998	Advanced Medication for the Blues			Syren Records
2001	Don't Count Us Out			Syren Records
2004	All I Know			Madjack Records
2006	Let It Roll			Fat Pete Records
2008	Country Morning Music			Aimless Records
2011	Bucksnort Blues			KSM Entertainment
2016	Songs From A Little Beach Town		1	KSM Entertainment

=== Compilation albums ===
Year	Album	Chart Peak	Label
2004	Retrospective Vol. 1		Syren Records
2012	20 Most Requested		KSM Entertainment

=== Songwriting credits ===
Year	Artist	Title	Chart Peak		Album	Co-writer(s)
Year	Artist	Title	Hot 100	Adult Contemporary	Album	Co-writer(s)
1969	Jerry Jeff Walker	"About Her Eyes"			Five Years Gone	
1971	The Wilburn Brothers	"I Wish I Could See You"			Sing Your Heart Out Country Boy	
1972	McKendree Spring	"Hobo Lady"			3	
1972	McKendree Spring	"Train To Dixie"			Tracks	
1972	McKendree Spring	"Shoot Me"			Tracks	
1976	McKendree Spring	"Clown"			Too Young To Feel This Old	
1976	McKendree Spring	"Oh, What A Feeling"			Too Young To Feel This Old	
1976	Jerry Jeff Walker	"Some Day I'll Get Out of These Bars			It's A Good Night For Singin'	Richard Gardner
1976	Jerry Jeff Walker	"Very Short Time"			It's A Good Night For Singin'	
1978	Jerry Jeff Walker	"I'm Not Strange"			Jerry Jeff	
1978	Jimmy Buffett	"Coast of Marseilles"			Son of a Son of a Sailor	
1978	Jimmy Buffett	"The Last Line"			Son of a Son of a Sailor	
1979	Jimmy Buffett	"Volcano"	66	43	Volcano	Jimmy Buffett, Harry Daily
1980	Rodney Crowell	"Oh, What A Feeling"			But What Will the Neighbors Think	
1980	Rosanne Cash	"Right Or Wrong"			Right Or Wrong	
1980	Rosanne Cash	"Take Me, Take Me"			Right Or Wrong	
1981	Rosanne Cash	"Rainin'"			Seven Year Ache	
1981	Rosanne Cash	"Only Human"			Seven Year Ache	
1981	Guy Clark	"Country Morning Music"			Heartworn Highways soundtrack	
1981	Rodney Crowell	"Just Wanna Dance"			Rodney Crowell	
1983	Mitch Ryder	"B.I.G.T.I.M.E."			Never Kick a Sleeping Dog	
1984	Sissy Spacek	"If You Could Only See Me Now"			Hangin' Up My Heart	
1986	Rodney Crowell	"Let Freedom Ring"			Street Language	Rodney Crowell
1986	Rodney Crowell	"Stay (Don't Be Cruel)"			Street Language	Rodney Crowell
1986	John Prine	"Love, Love, Love"			German Afternoons	John Prine
1990	Rosanne Cash	"Portrait"			Interiors, The Full Sessions	Rosanne Cash
1990	The Judds	"This Country's Rockin'"			Love Can Build a Bridge	Naomi Judd, Robert Johnson
1991	John Prine	"You Got Gold"			The Missing Years	John Prine
1991	John Prine	"Everybody Wants to Feel Like You"			The Missing Years	John Prine
1992	Chris Bell	"Stay With Me"			I Am the Cosmos	
1993	Rodney Crowell	"Talking to A Stranger"			Greatest Hits	Rodney Crowell
1995	Rodney Crowell	"Just Say Yes"			Jewel of the South	Rodney Crowell
1995	Guy Clark	"Shut Up and Talk to Me"			Dublin Blues	Guy Clark, Susanna Clark
1998	Jerry Jeff Walker	"Those Were The Days"			Cowboy Boots & Bathin' Suits	
1999	George Thorogood	"B.I.G.T.I.M.E."			Half a Boy/Half a Man	
1999	Guy Clark	"Be Gone Forever"			Cold Dog Soup	Anna McGarrigle
2001	Jerry Jeff Walker	"It Don't Matter"			Gonzo Stew	Jerry Jeff Walker, John Inmon
2002	Guy Clark	"She Loves to Ride Horses"			The Dark	Guy Clark
2005	John Prine	"Long Monday"			Fair & Square	John Prine
2005	Jed and Kelley	"Lavender Blue"			Lose To Win	
2007	Eric Gales	"Honey in the Comb			The Psychedelic Underground	Eric Gales
2007	Sunny Sweeney	"Lavender Blue"			Heartbreaker's Hall of Fame	
2013	Jed Zimmerman	"Back Home Down in Memphis"			Shedlight	Jed Zimmerman
2017	Max Gomez	"Make It Me"			Me & Joe	Max Gomez
2018	John Prine	"No Ordinary Blue"			The Tree of Forgiveness	John Prine

=== Producer credits ===
Year	Artist	Album
1988	John Kilzer	Memory in the Making: Label: Geffen Records; "Memory in the Making" No. 110 on Billboard Top 200; "Red Blue Jeans" #10 on Billboard Top Rock; "Green, Yellow, Red" #36 on Billboard Top Rock
1996	Tommy Tutone	Nervous Love: Label: Appaloosa Records
1999	Mason Ruffner	You Can't Win: Label: Burnside Records
2001	Nancy Apple	Outside The Lines: Label: Ringo Records
2003	Nancy Apple	Shoulda Lied About That: Label: Ringo Records
2005	Jed And Kelly	Lose To Win: Label: self-released
2009	Nancy Apple	Shine: Label: Ringo Records
2014	Matt Hoggett	Workaholic in Recovery: Label: self-released
2016	Double Dee	Adjust The Sails: Label: self-released
2021	Konner James	Konner James Radio: Label: KSME Records
