= Greatest Hits (Rodney Crowell album) =

Greatest hits album by Rodney Crowell
- Released: November 2, 1993
- Genre: Country
- Length: 43:44
- Label: Columbia
- Producers: Tony Brown; Rodney Crowell; Larry Klein

Rodney Crowell chronology
Life Is Messy (1992)	Greatest Hits (1993)	Let the Picture Paint Itself (1994)

Professional ratings
Review scores
Source	Rating
Allmusic	link
Entertainment Weekly	B link

Greatest Hits is the second compilation album by American country music artist Rodney Crowell. Released in 1993 (see 1993 in country music), It was his first greatest hits compilation for Columbia Records. It covers Crowell's most successful period from 1988's Diamonds & Dirt to 1992's Life Is Messy. It failed to chart on the Billboard Top Country Albums chart. One of three newly recorded tracks, "Even Cowgirls Get the Blues" was released as a single but failed to chart on the Hot Country Songs chart.

== Track listing ==
All songs composed by Rodney Crowell except when noted

No.	Title	Writer(s)	Length
1.	"Lovin' All Night"		3:47
2.	"Even Cowgirls Get the Blues"		3:54^{A}
3.	"What Kind of Love"	Crowell, Will Jennings, Roy Orbison	3:56
4.	"I Couldn't Leave You If I Tried"		3:17
5.	"After All This Time"		4:26
6.	"Talking to a Stranger"	Crowell, Keith Sykes	3:03^{A}
7.	"She's Crazy for Leavin'"	Crowell, Guy Clark	3:14
8.	"Many a Long & Lonesome Highway"	Crowell, Jennings	4:14
9.	"If Looks Could Kill"		3:24
10.	"It's Such a Small World" (duet with Rosanne Cash)		3:20
11.	"Things I Wish I'd Said"		4:05
12.	"Standing on a Rock"		3:04^{A}

- A Previously Unreleased

== Sources ==
- CMT
- Allmusic (see infobox)
- AOL Music profile
