= The Rodney Crowell Collection =

Compilation album by Rodney Crowell
- Released: August 8, 1989
- Genre: Country
- Length: 46:32
- Label: Warner Bros. Nashville
- Producer: various

Rodney Crowell chronology
Diamonds & Dirt (1988)	The Rodney Crowell Collection (1989)	Keys to the Highway (1989)

Professional ratings
Review scores
Source	Rating
Allmusic -	4.5/5 stars

The Rodney Crowell Collection is the title of the first compilation album by American country music artist Rodney Crowell. It was released in 1989 (see 1989 in country music) by Crowell's former label, Warner Bros. Records, following the huge success of his album Diamonds & Dirt. It features selections from his first three albums that were released under the Warner Bros. label between 1978 and 1981. It charted #65 on the Top Country Albums chart.

The album is the first release of Crowell singing "I Don't Have to Crawl" The Crowell-penned tune was recorded by Emmylou Harris and released in 1981 on her album. Evangeline. Crowell recorded his version in 1984 for what was to be a new album for Warner Bros., Street Language. That album was never released and instead was re-recorded in 1986 for Crowell's new label, Columbia, but without "I Don't Have to Crawl".

== Track listing ==
Tracklengths vary slightly from album versions with no change to the actual song.

1. "Ashes by Now" (Rodney Crowell) - 4:09
2. "'Til I Gain Control Again" (Crowell) - 5:07
3. "Voilá, An American Dream" (Crowell) - 3:49
4. "Queen of Hearts" (Hank DeVito) - 3:39
5. "Shame on the Moon" (Crowell) - 4:35
6. "Old Pipeliner" (Tommy Hill, Ray King) - 2:59
7. "Stars on the Water" (Crowell) - 3:42
8. "Heartbroke" (Guy Clark) - 3:33
9. "I Don't Have to Crawl" (Crowell) - 3:59
10. "Leaving Louisiana in the Broad Daylight" (Donivan Cowart, Rodney Crowell) - 3:24
11. "Victim or a Fool" (Crowell) - 2:57
12. "I Ain't Living Long Like This" (Crowell) - 4:50

=== Notes ===
- Tracks 3, 10 & 12 taken from Ain't Living Long Like This (1978)
- Tracks 1, 4 & 8 taken from But What Will the Neighbors Think (1980)
- Tracks 2, 5 - 7 & 11 taken from Rodney Crowell (1981)
- Track 9 previously unreleased

== Chart performance ==
Chart (1989)	Peak position
U.S. Billboard Top Country Albums	65

== Sources ==
- CMT
- Allmusic (see infobox)
- AOL Music profile
