= Anthony Crawford (musician, born 1957) =

American songwriter

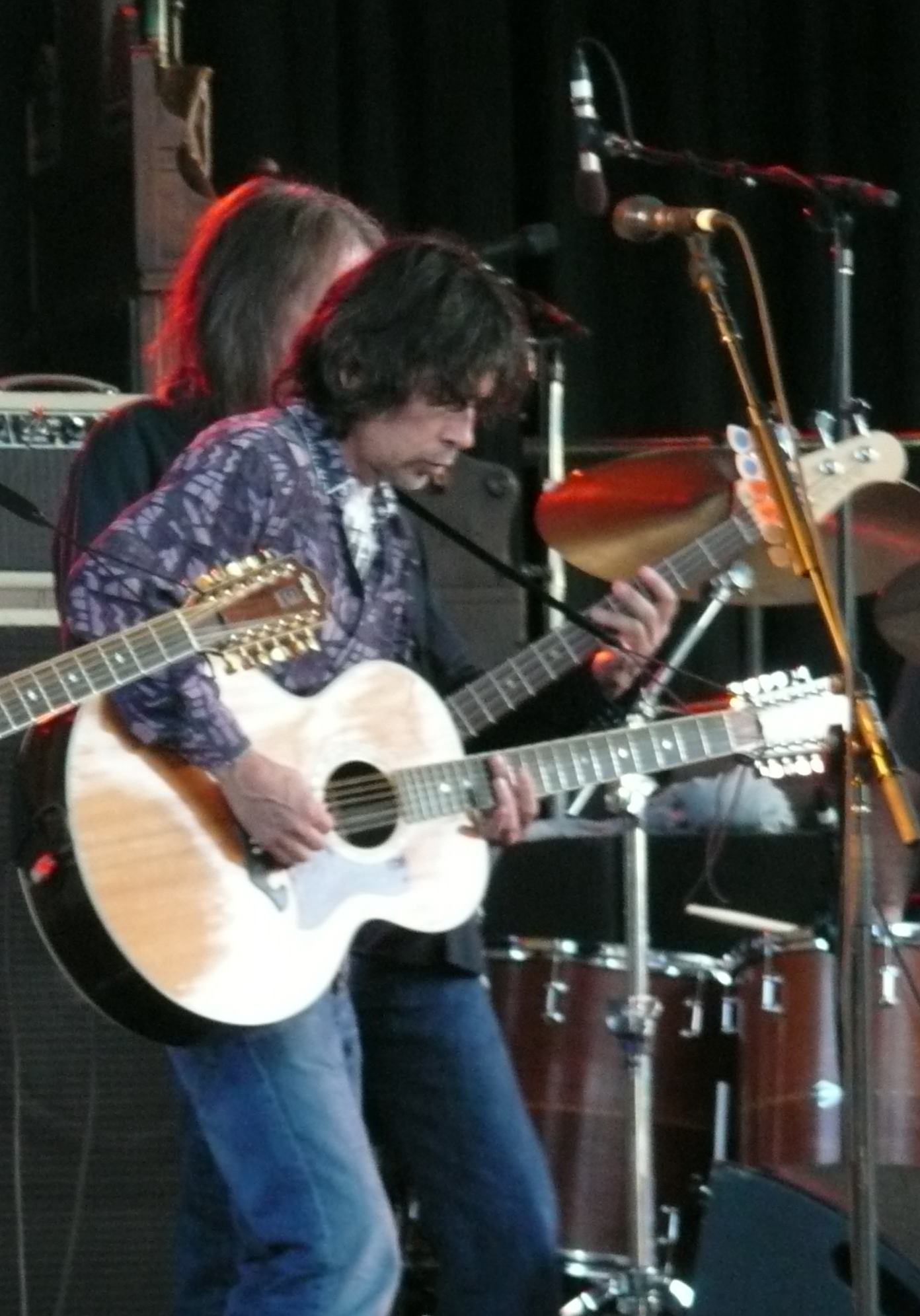
Anthony Crawford, 2009

Anthony Crawford (born May 5, 1957) is an American multi-instrumentalist, singer and songwriter, who has worked with many well-known musicians in the studio, onstage and as a songwriter. Crawford has also released several solo albums in addition to two albums and a DVD with his wife, Savana Lee, as Sugarcane Jane.

Although born in Birmingham, Nashville became Anthony's home, where he performed live at Opryland USA, toured with the Sonny James Band, and appeared on television’s Hee Haw and The Ralph Emery Show. He caught the eye of many in Nashville including Rounder Records and Little Dog Records.

After traveling throughout the Southeast playing various string instruments, his opportunities expanded to include tours with Neil Young. In between tours with Young backing bands The Shocking Pinks, International Harvesters, and Electric Band, Anthony also toured with Steve Winwood, Dwight Yoakam, Vince Gill, the Pegi Young Band, Nicolette Larson and Blackhawk.

A prolific songwriter, Crawford has over four hundred songs to his credit, many recorded by artists including Steve Winwood, Pegi Young, Kenny Rogers, Lee Greenwood, the Nitty Gritty Dirt Band, Sawyer Brown, Billy Burnette, and Lorrie Morgan. Anthony’s solo career includes a self-titled debut album, Radio Cafe, and Five Is Red (a collaborative album recorded with Everest and Bo Koster from My Morning Jacket).

With wife/singing partner Savana Lee, he created Sugarcane Jane in 2009 and tour the southeast. Anthony opened his recording studio Admiral Bean in 2010.

== Solo albums ==
- "Anthony Crawford" - Little Dog Records - Producer- Pete Anderson (1993) - Two singles appeared on Gavin's Adult Contemporary Chart: "Fit In" peaked at # 20, "On The Edge" peaked at # 15
- "Unintentional Decoy" - AC Sound - Producer -Anthony Crawford (1995)
- “Radio Café” - Cason Companies – Producer Buzz Cason/Anthony Crawford (2000)
- “Five is Red” - Independent release – Producer Anthony Crawford (2009)

== Album appearances ==
- Eddie Rabbitt Radio Romance Liberty Records (1982)
- Tanya Tucker Changes Arista (1983)
- Rosanne Cash Rhythm and Romance Columbia (1985)
- Rodney Crowell Street Language (1986)
- Neil Young Everybody's Rockin' Geffen (1983)
- Neil Young Old Ways Geffen (1983–1985)
- Vince Gill When I Call Your Name MCA Nashville (1989)
- Steve Winwood Refugee of the Heart Virgin Records (1990)
- Steve Forbert The American In Me Geffen (1992)
- Pete Anderson Working Class (1994)
- Dwight Yoakam Gone Reprise (1995)
- Dwight Yoakam Under The Covers (1997)
- Neil Young Prairie Wind Reprise Records (2005)
- Neil Young Fork in the Road Reprise Records (2009)
- Neil Young A Treasure Reprise Records (2011)

== Played on tour with ==
- Sonny James (1981)
- Neil Young and The Shocking Pinks North American Tour (1983)
- Neil Young and the "International Harvesters" World Tour (1984-85)
- Nicolette Larson (1986–1987)
- Vince Gill (1989)
- Steve Winwood "Roll with It Tour" (1988–1990)
- Steve Forbert "The American In Me" (1990)
- Dwight Yoakam “Gone” World Tour (1996–1997)
- Blackhawk "For The Sake Of The Song" (2003–2007)
- Neil Young (2007–2009)

== Video and TV appearances ==
- 1980 "Grand Ole Opry Matinee" Solo
- 1981 "Hee Haw" with Sonny James
- 1983-85 with Neil Young - "Austin City Limits", "Nashville Now", "Live Aid", "Farm Aid I and II", “New Orlean’s World Fair", "Cryin" video and "Wonderin" video
- 1988-89 with Nicolette Larson - "Nashville Now", "Hee Haw", "Jamboree in the Hills"
- 1989 with Steve Winwood - "Showtime"
- 1990-1996 with Rodney Crowell - "Lovin' All Night" video, and "Nashville Now"
- 1996 SOLO - "Country Today", "Fit In" video, "On The Edge" video
- 1996-97 with Dwight Yoakam - "Late Show with David Letterman", "Grammy Awards Show", "The Tonight Show with Jay Leno", and "Gone" video
- 2003 Blackhawk DVD
- 2005 with Neil Young (Directed by Jonathan Demme)- “Heart of Gold” movie and DVD
- 2008 with Neil Young – “Farm Aid”

== Compositions ==
Steve Winwood, Dwight Yoakam, Kenny Rogers, Lee Greenwood, The Nitty Gritty Dirt Band, Billy Burnette, Lorrie Morgan, Sawyer Brown, and The Oak Ridge Boys have all recorded songs written by Crawford.

== Production ==
Steve Forbert, Willie Sugarcapps, Sugarcane Jane, Edward David Anderson, Scott Nolan, Savana Lee, Cary Laine, Rusty Miller, Sterling Fletcher, Pete Nice, Sassafrass, T-Bone Montgomery, Lauren Kay, Corey Rezner, Laci Wright, Charles Davis

== Instrumentalist ==
Acoustic guitar, electric guitar, bass guitar, mandolin, violin, drums, harmonica, pedal steel, piano, keyboards and banjo.
