= Does My Ring Burn Your Finger =

2001 single by Lee Ann Womack

Single by Lee Ann Womack

from the album I Hope You Dance
- B-side: "Lord, I Hope This Day Is Good"
- Released: October 29, 2001
- Genre: Neotraditional country; bluegrass
- Length: 3:30 (album version); 3:17 (radio edit)
- Label: MCA Nashville
- Songwriters: Julie Miller; Buddy Miller
- Producer: Frank Liddell

Lee Ann Womack singles chronology
"Why They Call It Falling" (2001)	"Does My Ring Burn Your Finger" (2001)	"Something Worth Leaving Behind" (2002)

"Does My Ring Burn Your Finger" is a song written by husband and wife duo Julie and Buddy Miller. It was originally recorded by Buddy on his third studio album Cruel Moon, released in 1999. American country music artist Lee Ann Womack took an interest in the song and recorded her own version for her third studio album I Hope You Dance (2000). Her version features backing vocals by the Millers. The song would be officially released on October 29, 2001, as the fourth and final single from the album via MCA Nashville Records.

The least successful single from the album, it peaked at number 23 on the US Billboard Hot Country Songs chart.

== Content ==
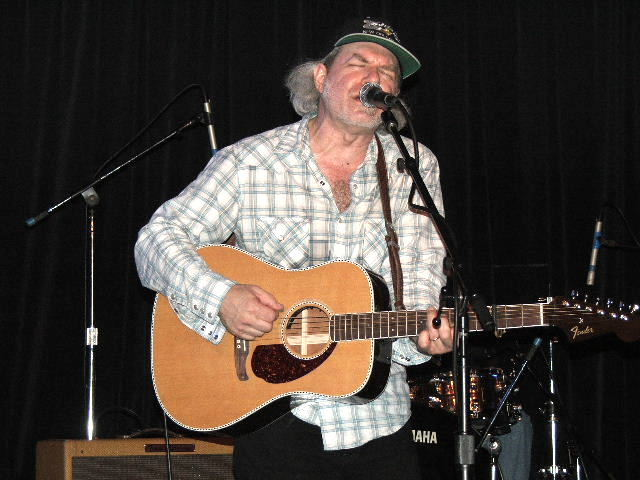
"Does My Ring Burn Your Finger" was originally recorded by Buddy Miller (pictured in 2005).

The song is performed in the key of B major. The Daily Gazette says the song "takes the listener on a harrowing journey through love that is pain, mostly; but also sometimes, and surprisingly, brings joy."

During the making of I Hope You Dance, Womack listened to music outside of Nashville, which led her to recording songs by Texas country artists like Rodney Crowell, Bruce Robison, and Buddy and Julie Miller, of which Womack would record this song.

== Critical reception ==
For Buddy's version, Peter Applebome of The New York Times called "Does My Ring Burn Your Finger" his quintessential song. The Daily Gazette said, "the writing is deceptive, plain-spoken but sophisticated, and it takes immense control and restraint to make music this multi-layered sound so backwoods simple."

Chuck Taylor of Billboard called Womack's rendition of the song "a haunting hillbilly treatise on the pain of betrayal and loss" that "adds up to a vibrant record that both fans and programmers should find impossible to ignore." Blue Suede News gave the track a positive review, calling it a "great song" that brings an "earthy edge to an already edgy subject." Ken Barnes of USA Today listed the song as the number one single of 2001 and wrote, " A searing, chill-conjuring performance of a seething Buddy and Julie Miller tune by country's reigning female vocalist."

== Chart performance ==
"Does My Ring Burn Your Finger" debuted at number 58 on the US Billboard Hot Country Songs chart the week of November 10, 2001.

== Track listing ==
US vinyl single

1. "Does My Ring Burn Your Finger" (J. Miller, B. Miller) – 3:27
2. "Lord, I Hope This Day Is Good" (Dave Hanner) – 2:54

== Personnel ==
Credits adapted from I Hope You Dance liner notes.

- Sam Bacco — percussion
- Richard Bennett — bouzouki
- Chad Cromwell — drums
- Larry Franklin — fiddle
- Paul Franklin — pedal steel guitar
- Kenny Greenberg — electric guitar
- Buddy Miller — backing vocals
- Julie Miller — backing vocals
- Jeff Roach — electric piano
- Lee Ann Womack — lead vocals
- Glenn Worf — bass

== Live performances ==
Womack performed the song on The Today Show on August 18, 2001. She would notably perform the song at the 2001 CMA Awards.

== Charts ==
=== Weekly charts ===
Chart (2001–2002)	Peak position
US Hot Country Songs (Billboard)	23
US Country Top 50 (Radio & Records)	18

=== Year-end charts ===
Chart (2002)	Peak position
US Country Songs (Billboard)	82
US Country (Radio & Records)	93
