= The Outsider (Rodney Crowell album) =

Studio album by Rodney Crowell
- Released: August 16, 2005
- Genre: Country
- Label: Columbia
- Producer: Rodney Crowell, Peter Coleman

Rodney Crowell chronology
Fate's Right Hand (2003)	The Outsider (2005)	Sex & Gasoline (2008)

The Outsider is the twelfth studio album by American country music singer Rodney Crowell. It was released on August 16, 2005, via Columbia Records. The album includes the singles "The Obscenity Prayer" and "Say You Love Me".

== Critical reception ==
Thom Jurek of AllMusic called the album a "natural extension" of Crowell's last two albums, The Houston Kid and Fate's Right Hand. He also praised the album for "dig[ging] deep into social and political consciousness."

== Track listing ==
All songs written by Rodney Crowell, except "Shelter from the Storm", written by Bob Dylan.

No.	Title	Length
1.	"Say You Love Me"	3:32
2.	"The Obscenity Prayer (Give It to Me)"	3:54
3.	"The Outsider"	4:23
4.	"Dancin' Circles 'Round the Sun (Epictetus Speaks)"	4:32
5.	"Beautiful Despair (For James)"	3:53
6.	"Don't Get Me Started"	5:51
7.	"Ignorance Is the Enemy" (spoken intro by Emmylou Harris and John Prine)	4:48
8.	"Glasgow Girl"	4:43
9.	"Things That Go Bump in the Day"	4:01
10.	"Shelter from the Storm" (duet with Emmylou Harris)	5:26
11.	"We Can't Turn Back Now"	4:49

== Personnel ==
Compiled from notes on digipak.

=== Musicians ===
- Eddie Bayers – drums
- Richard Bennett – guitars, fuzzbox
- Pat Buchanan – guitars, harmonica, background vocals
- Beth Nielsen Chapman – background vocals
- J. T. Corenflos – guitars
- John Cowan – background vocals
- Chad Cromwell – drums
- Rodney Crowell – lead and background vocals, guitars
- Kim Fleming – background vocals
- Steve Fischell – steel guitar
- Shannon Forrest – drums
- Tony Harrell – organ, keyboards
- Emmylou Harris – background vocals, guitar
- John Hobbs – organ, keyboards
- Jim Horn – saxophone
- Jedd Hughes – guitars, mandolin, background vocals
- The Jenkins – background vocals
- Will Kimbrough – lead guitar, background vocals
- Trey Landry – drums
- Billy Livsey – organ
- Jerry McPherson – guitars
- Buddy Miller – background vocals
- Julie Miller – background vocals
- John Mock – concertina, tin whistle
- Greg Morrow – drums
- Will Owsley – background vocals
- Marcia Ramirez – background vocals
- Michael Rhodes – bass guitar
- Chris Rodriguez – background vocals
- Vince Santoro – background vocals
- Randy Scruggs – flamenco guitar
- Steuart Smith – lead guitar
- JD Souther – background vocals
- Crystal Taliefero – background vocals
- Randall Waller – background vocals
- Jonathan Yudkin – strings, fiddle

=== Technical ===
- Tracy Baskette-Fleaner – art direction, design
- Peter Coleman – producer, recording, mixing
- Donivan Cowart – additional recording
- Rodney Crowell – producer
- Brandon Epps – recording assistant
- John Grady – executive producer
- Deb Haus – art director
- Dawn Nepp – production assistant
- Thomas Petillo – photography
- Jennifer Tsar – photography

== Chart performance ==
Chart (2005)	Peak position
U.S. Billboard Top Country Albums	37
U.S. Billboard Top Heatseekers	12
