= Why They Call It Falling =

Single by Lee Ann Womack

from the album I Hope You Dance
- B-side: "I Feel Like I'm Forgetting Something"
- Released: April 16, 2001
- Genre: Country
- Length: 3:35
- Label: MCA Nashville
- Songwriters: Don Schlitz; Roxie Dean
- Producer: Mark Wright

Lee Ann Womack singles chronology
"Ashes by Now" (2000)	"Why They Call It Falling" (2001)	"Does My Ring Burn Your Finger" (2001)

"Why They Call It Falling" is a song by American country music recording artist Lee Ann Womack, taken from her third studio album I Hope You Dance (2000). The track was penned by Don Schlitz and Roxie Dean, with production provided by Mark Wright. It was released on April 16, 2001, as the third single from the album.

== Music video ==
The music video for "Why They Call It Falling" is taken from a live performance on CMT Showcase, directed by Paul Reeves. The video was released to CMT on July 8, 2001.

== Critical reception ==
Editors at Billboard called the song "A stunning ballad that showcases the chanteuse's heart-in-throat vocals." They also said, "It's a savvy lyric, and Womack's tender, vulnerable delivery perfectly complements the song. Add to that Mark Wright's production, which keeps everything swirling and swelling around her vocals, and it's a small sonic masterpiece. Womack continues to distinguish herself as the most compelling young female vocalist in country music."

== Personnel ==
Credits adapted from I Hope You Dance liner notes.

- David Campbell — string section arrangements
- Mark Casstevens — acoustic guitar
- Pat Flynn — acoustic guitar
- Larry Franklin — mandolin
- Paul Franklin — slide guitar
- Brent Mason — electric guitar
- Steve Nathan — keyboards
- Jason Sellers — backing vocals
- Lonnie Wilson — drums
- Glenn Worf — bass
- Lee Ann Womack — lead and backing vocals
- Nashville String Machine — string section

== Live performances ==
Womack performed "Why They Call It Falling" on The Tonight Show with Jay Leno.

== Charts ==
"Why They Call It Falling" debuted at number 58 on the US Billboard Hot Country Songs chart the week of April 7, 2001, rising to a peak position of number 13 on August 18, 2001.

=== Weekly charts ===
Chart (2001)	Peak position
US Hot Country Songs (Billboard)	13
US Billboard Hot 100	78
US Radio Songs (Billboard)	74
US Country Top 50 (Radio & Records)	13

=== Year-end charts ===
Chart (2001)	Position
US Country Songs (Billboard)	58
US Country (Radio & Records)	57
