= Claudia Church =

American country singer

- Born: January 12, 1962 (age 64)
- Origin: Lenoir, North Carolina, U.S.
- Genres: Country
- Occupation: Singer-songwriter
- Instrument: Vocals
- Years active: 1998–present
- Label: Reprise
- Spouse: Rodney Crowell (m. 1998)

Claudia Lorraine Church (born January 12, 1962) is an American country music singer-songwriter whose singles include "What's the Matter With You Baby" and "Home in My Heart (North Carolina)".

== Biography ==
Church was the second daughter of Claude and Lucille Church. Her father was a member of the US Army, so she lived in such places as Okinawa; Fayetteville, North Carolina; Sandy, Utah; and Colorado Springs, Colorado; before she graduated from General William Mitchell High School. After graduating, she moved to Dallas to attend college and continued her modeling career. Modeling had her working in cities such as Chicago and Paris. In 1988, she moved to Nashville to realize her dreams of becoming a singer.

She has been married to singer-songwriter Rodney Crowell since 1998. They met while shooting a music video. During a brief break-up, Crowell wrote the song "Please Remember Me", which later became a hit for Tim McGraw. Later Crowell wrote "Making Memories of Us" for her as a Valentine's Day gift. The song became a major hit for Keith Urban.

== Discography ==
=== Albums ===
Title	Album details
Claudia Church	Release date: March 9, 1999; Label: Reprise

=== Singles ===
Year	Single	Peak positions		Album
Year	Single	US Country	CAN Country	Album
1999	"What's the Matter with You Baby"	41	35	Claudia Church
1999	"Home in My Heart (North Carolina)"	63	83	Claudia Church
1999	"It's All Your Fault"	—	—	Claudia Church
"—" denotes releases that did not chart

=== Music videos ===
Year	Video	Director
1999	"What's the Matter with You Baby"	Gerry Wenner
1999	"Home in My Heart (North Carolina)"	Gerry Wenner
