= Fate's Right Hand (album) =

Studio album by Rodney Crowell
- Released: July 29, 2003
- Genre: Country
- Label: DMZ/Epic
- Producers: Peter Coleman, Rodney Crowell

Rodney Crowell chronology
The Houston Kid (2001)	Fate's Right Hand (2003)	The Outsider (2005)

Fate's Right Hand is the eleventh studio album by American country music singer Rodney Crowell. It was released on July 29, 2003, via Epic Records. The album includes Crowell's last charting single, "Earthbound", which spent one week at number 60 on the Billboard Hot Country Songs chart.

== Critical reception ==
Thom Jurek of AllMusic said that the album was "the finest record Crowell has issued since Diamonds & Dirt and may turn out to be the finest of his entire career".

== Track listing ==
All tracks are written by Rodney Crowell.

No.	Title	Length
1.	"Still Learning How to Fly"	4:10
2.	"Fate's Right Hand"	5:26
3.	"Earthbound"	4:24
4.	"Time to Go Inward"	5:23
5.	"The Man in Me"	4:20
6.	"Ridin' Out the Storm"	4:36
7.	"Preachin' to the Choir"	5:08
8.	"It's a Different World Now"	4:01
9.	"Come On Funny Feelin'"	3:47
10.	"Adam's Song"	4:54
11.	"This Too Will Pass"	4:16

== Personnel ==
- Richard Bennett – electric guitar, hi-string guitar
- Pat Buchanan – electric guitar
- John Cowan – background vocals
- Rodney Crowell – bouzouki, acoustic guitar, baritone guitar, electric guitar, lead vocals
- Jerry Douglas – Dobro
- Béla Fleck – banjo
- Tony Harrell – organ
- John Hobbs – organ
- Carl Jackson – background vocals
- John Jorgenson – electric guitar, mandolin
- Will Kimbrough – accordion, Dobro, baritone guitar
- Trey Landrey – drums
- Paul Leim – djembe, drums, percussion
- Billy Livsey – harmonium, keyboard programming, organ
- Charlie McCoy – harmonica
- Jerry McPherson – electric guitar
- Greg Morrow – drums
- Marcia Ramirez – background vocals
- David Rawlings – background vocals
- Michael Rhodes – bass guitar
- Kim Richey – background vocals
- Chris Rodriguez – acoustic guitar
- Barbara Santoro – background vocals
- Vince Santoro – drums, background vocals
- Russell Smith – background vocals
- Steuart Smith – electric guitar
- Randall Waller – background vocals
- Gillian Welch – background vocals

== Chart performance ==
=== Album ===
Chart (2003)	Peak position
U.S. Billboard Top Country Albums	29
U.S. Billboard Top Heatseekers	14

=== Singles ===
Year	Single	Peak chart positions
Year	Single	US Country
2003	"Earthbound"	60
