= The Chicago Sessions =

Studio album by Rodney Crowell
- Released: May 5, 2023
- Studio: The Loft, Chicago, US
- Genre: Country; Americana
- Length: 40:10
- Label: New West
- Producer: Jeff Tweedy

Rodney Crowell chronology
Triage (2021)	The Chicago Sessions (2023)

The Chicago Sessions is an album by American musician Rodney Crowell, released on May 5, 2023, through New West Records. It was produced by Wilco frontman Jeff Tweedy, and includes a collaboration with him on the track "Everything at Once". It received acclaim from critics.

== Background ==
Crowell met Wilco frontman Jeff Tweedy when both played the Cayamo Cruise, a folk music festival that takes place on a cruise ship. Tweedy told Crowell he should travel to Chicago and record at the band's studio, the Loft, which Crowell followed up on, resulting in the album.

== Critical reception ==
Professional ratings
Aggregate scores
Source	Rating
Metacritic	84/100
Review scores
Source	Rating
AllMusic	4/5 stars
American Songwriter	4/5 stars
Mojo	4/5 stars
Paste	7.2/10
PopMatters	9/10
Slant Magazine	3.5/5 stars
Uncut	8/10

The Chicago Sessions received a score of 84 out of 100 on review aggregator Metacritic based on eight critics' reviews, indicating "universal acclaim". American Songwriter's Lee Zimmerman wrote that Crowell's "skills are, naturally, apparent as always, and given his decision to put Jeff Tweedy in the producer's chair, another exceptional album is all but assured", elaborating that he is "in prime form, and the ten songs that make up the set list hold to the high standard he's known for". Mark Deming of AllMusic felt that enlisting Tweedy as producer results in "one of Crowell's most purely enjoyable albums, capturing him in excellent form as a writer and a performer" as well as an album that "sounds loose without being the least bit sloppy".

Paste's Eric R. Danton described it as "the work of a singer and songwriter with nothing left to prove, which means that Crowell can simply enjoy himself" as he "has no thematic agenda with these songs". Reviewing the album for PopMatters, Michael Elliott also acclaimed Tweedy's approach to production, saying that Crowell sounds "comfortable, confident, and at ease throughout The Chicago Sessions while gifting us some of his best material in years" and concluded "that both his pen and voice are still as vital as ever".

Jeremy Winograd of Slant Magazine opined that Tweedy "wields a light touch as producer and accompanist, mostly keeping Crowell within his acoustic country-folk and boogie-based wheelhouse, abetted by simple, crisply recorded arrangements". Glide Magazine's Doug Collette called it "so unassuming an offering it may very well sneak onto more than a few 'Best of '23' lists, this LP certainly deserves such placement. Its forty-some minutes contain more than a few of those deeply stirring moments only truly great records possess".

Uncut felt that "at 72 years of age, Crowell remains both a vital link to Van Zandt's classic sensibility and an enduring force whose vitality shows few signs of waning". Mojo stated that "beneath Tweedy's twinkling lights, Crowell wears each look like a favourite old coat – familiar, easy, and pocked by stains and rips that remind him of all he's seen".

== Track listing ==
All tracks are written by Rodney Crowell, except where noted.

The Chicago Sessions track listing
No.	Title	Writer(s)	Length
1.	"Lucky"		4:24
2.	"Somebody Loves You"		4:35
3.	"Loving You Is the Only Way to Fly"	Crowell; Jedd Hughes; Sarah Buxton	3:27
4.	"You're Supposed to Be Feeling Good"		4:03
5.	"No Place to Fall"	Townes Van Zandt	3:21
6.	"Oh Miss Claudia"		4:24
7.	"Everything at Once" (featuring Jeff Tweedy)	Crowell; Tweedy	3:45
8.	"Ever the Dark"		3:27
9.	"Making Lovers Out of Friends"	Crowell; Ashley McBryde	4:30
10.	"Ready to Move On"		4:14
Total length:			40:10
