= The Houston Kid =

Studio album by Rodney Crowell
- Released: 2001
- Genre: Country
- Label: Sugar Hill
- Producer: Peter Coleman

Rodney Crowell chronology
Jewel of the South (1995)	The Houston Kid (2001)	Fate's Right Hand (2003)

Professional ratings
Review scores
Source	Rating
AllMusic	5/5 stars
Robert Christgau	A−
Entertainment Weekly	A−
People	(very favorable)

The Houston Kid is the 10th album by American country music singer Rodney Crowell. It was released through Sugar Hill in 2001. The album includes the single "I Walk the Line Revisited", recorded in collaboration with Johnny Cash, which peaked at number 61 on the Hot Country Songs charts in late 1998.

== Track listing ==
All songs written by Rodney Crowell except where noted.

1. "Telephone Road" – 3:52
2. "The Rock of My Soul" – 4:50
3. "Why Don't We Talk About It" – 3:35
4. "I Wish It Would Rain" – 3:28
5. "Wandering Boy" – 5:57
6. "I Walk the Line (Revisited)" (featuring Johnny Cash) (Crowell, Johnny Cash) – 3:51
7. "Highway 17" – 4:54
8. "U Don't Know How Much I Hate U" (Crowell, Steve Lukather) – 3:37
9. "Banks of the Old Bandera" – 3:41
10. "Topsy Turvy" – 3:47
11. "I Know Love Is All I Need" – 5:20

== Personnel ==
- Pat Buchanan - acoustic guitar, electric guitar, vocals
- Johnny Cash - Vocals
- Peter Coleman - Producer, Engineer, Mixing
- Steve Conn - Organ
- John Cowan - Vocals
- Donivan Cowart - Engineer
- Chad Cromwell - Drums
- Rodney Crowell - acoustic guitar, electric guitar, percussion, vocals
- Jim Dineen - Engineer
- Kenny Greenberg - electric guitar
- John Hobbs - Organ, Keyboards, Sampling
- John Jorgenson - electric guitar
- Tim Lauer - Keyboards
- Hunter Lee - Pipe
- Dan Leffler - Engineer, Second Engineer
- Paul Leim - Percussion, Drums
- Charlie McCoy - Harmonica
- Greg Morrow - Drums
- Michael Rhodes - Bass
- Vince Santoro - Vocals
- Steuart Smith - Harmonica, Mandolin, Autoharp, electric guitar, Harmonium, Producer
- Benmont Tench - piano
- David Thoener - Mixing
- Robby Turner - Dobro, steel guitar
- Kenny Vaughan - Flamenco Guitar
- Ian Wallace - Drums
- Produced by Peter Coleman

== Chart performance ==
Chart (2001)	Peak position
U.S. Billboard Top Country Albums	32
U.S. Billboard Top Independent Albums	19
