= I Walk the Line Revisited =

Song by Johnny Cash and Waylon Jennings

Single by Rodney Crowell with Johnny Cash

from the album The Houston Kid
- B-side: "Stars on the Water"
- Released: 1998
- Genre: Country, country rock, rockabilly
- Label: Reprise
- Songwriters: Rodney Crowell, Johnny Cash
- Producer: Rodney Crowell

Rodney Crowell with Johnny Cash singles chronology
"Please Remember Me" (1995)	"I Walk the Line Revisited" (1998)

"I Walk the Line Revisited" is a song recorded by Rodney Crowell with Johnny Cash, who sings the lyrics of his song "I Walk the Line" to a new melody.

Released as a single in 1998, it peaked at number 61 on U.S. Billboard's country chart for the week of November 28.

In 2001, the song appeared on Rodney Crowell's album The Houston Kid and was re-issued as a promo single from that album.

== Track listing ==
CD single (Reprise 9 17149-2, 1998)
No.	Title	Writer(s)	Artist(s)	Length
1.	"I Walk the Line Revisited" (Single Version)	Rodney Crowell, Johnny Cash	Rodney Crowell with Johnny Cash	2:44
2.	"Stars on the Water" (Album Version)	Rodney Crowell	Rodney Crowell	3:41

CD promo single (Sugar Hill SUG-CD-1065I, 2001)
No.	Title	Artist(s)	Length
1.	"I Walk the Line (Revisited)"	Rodney Crowell featuring Johnny Cash	3:51
2.	"Interview with Billy Bob Thornton"

== Charts ==
Chart (1998)	Peak position
US Hot Country Songs (Billboard)	61
