= Let the Picture Paint Itself =

Studio album by Rodney Crowell
- Released: May 10, 1994
- Recorded: March 1994
- Venue: Sound Stage Studio in Nashville, TN
- Genre: Country
- Length: 37:52
- Label: MCA
- Producer: Tony Brown; Rodney Crowell

Rodney Crowell chronology
Greatest Hits (1993)	Let the Picture Paint Itself (1994)	Jewel of the South (1995)

Let the Picture Paint Itself is an album by the American musician Rodney Crowell, released in 1994 by MCA Records. His first release for that label, it failed to chart on the Billboard Top Country Albums chart. The songs "Let the Picture Paint Itself", "Big Heart" and "I Don't Fall in Love So Easy" were released as singles but did not chart successfully.

== Critical reception ==
Professional ratings
Review scores
Source	Rating
AllMusic	3/5 stars
The Encyclopedia of Popular Music	3/5 stars
Entertainment Weekly	A
(The New) Rolling Stone Album Guide	3/5 stars

Entertainment Weekly wrote: "With the country scene overcrowded with Stetson-wearing cartoon figures, Picture is refreshing for its honesty and intelligence, a glorious example of a master returning to form."

== Track listing ==
All songs composed by Rodney Crowell except when noted

1. "Let the Picture Paint Itself" - 4:07
2. "Give My Heart a Rest" - 3:32
3. "Stuff That Works" (Guy Clark, Crowell) - 4:03
4. "Big Heart" - 3:40
5. "Loving You Makes Me Strong" - 3:42
6. "The Best Years of Our Lives" - 2:40
7. "I Don't Fall in Love So Easy" - 3:49
8. "That Ol' Door" - 4:30
9. "The Rose of Memphis" (Clark, Crowell) - 3:39
10. "Once in a While" (Crowell, John Leventhal) - 4:10

== Personnel ==
- Eddie Bayers - drums
- Jim Cox - organ, synthesizer, piano
- Rodney Crowell - vocals, acoustic guitar, electric guitar
- Stuart Duncan - fiddle
- Paul Franklin - Dobro, guitar, steel guitar
- Bob Glaub - bass guitar
- Dann Huff - electric guitar
- Patty Loveless - background and harmony vocals
- Liana Manis - background and harmony vocals
- Brent Mason - acoustic guitar, electric guitar
- Steve Nathan - organ, synthesizer, piano
- Herb Pedersen - background vocals
- Brent Rowan - electric guitar
- Billy Stanford - electric guitar
- Harry Stinson - background vocals
- Glenn Worf - bass guitar
- Trisha Yearwood - background and harmony vocals

== Singles ==
Year	Single	US Country	CAN Country
1994	"Let the Picture Paint Itself"	60	50
1994	"Big Heart"	75	70
1994	"Let's Make Trouble"	-	-
