= Street Language =

Studio album by Rodney Crowell
- Released: 1986
- Genres: Country, rock
- Length: 39:23
- Label: Columbia
- Producers: Rodney Crowell; Booker T. Jones

Rodney Crowell chronology
Rodney Crowell (1981)	Street Language (1986)	Diamonds & Dirt (1988)

Professional ratings
Review scores
Source	Rating
AllMusic	2/5 stars

Street Language is the fourth studio album by American country music artist Rodney Crowell. It was released in 1986 (see 1986 in country music) by Columbia Records, his first release on that label. It peaked at No. 38 on the Top Country Albums chart. The songs, "Let Freedom Ring", "When I'm Free Again", "She Loves the Jerk" and "Looking for You" were released as singles but they all failed to chart within the top 20. This album was co-produced by R&B artist Booker T. Jones and features a blend of soul and country music.

In 1984, Crowell recorded what was to be a new album for Warner Bros., Street Language. That album, a pop-sounding effort co–produced by David Malloy, was rejected by Warner Bros, and was never released. The label requested a more Nashville-friendly record, but Crowell negotiated a release from his contract and moved to Columbia. He then brought in Booker T. Jones as co-producer and re-recorded a more rock and roll/electric-sounding Street Language in 1986.

The song "Looking for You" was co-written with Crowell's then wife, Rosanne Cash. "She Loves the Jerk" was written and first recorded by John Hiatt in 1983 and was included on his album, Riding with the King. It would later be covered by Elvis Costello.

Crowell's version of "I Don't Have to Crawl" was recorded for the Warner Bros. release, but did not make it onto the final Columbia album. That track was released in 1989 on the Rodney Crowell Collection.

== Track listing ==
No.	Title	Writer(s)	Length
1.	"Let Freedom Ring"	Rodney Crowell, Keith Sykes	4:29
2.	"Ballad of Fast Eddie"	Crowell, Emory Gordy Jr.	3:48
3.	"When I'm Free Again"	Crowell, Will Jennings	3:48
4.	"She Loves the Jerk"	John Hiatt	3:35
5.	"When the Blue Hour Comes"	Crowell, Jennings, Roy Orbison	4:13
6.	"Oh King Richard"	Crowell	4:15
7.	"Looking for You"	Rosanne Cash, Crowell	4:33
8.	"Stay (Don't Be Cruel)"	Crowell, Sykes	3:49
9.	"The Best I Can"	Crowell, Hank DeVito, Gordy	2:41
10.	"Past Like a Mask"	Crowell	4:12

== Personnel ==
- Mike Baird — drums
- Eddie Bayers — drums
- Richard Bennett — acoustic guitar
- Ben Cauley — horn
- Bobby Clark — mandolin
- Anthony Crawford — background vocals
- Quitman Dennis — horn
- Hank DeVito — steel guitar
- Rick DiFonzo — guitar
- Anton Fig — drums
- Vince Gill — acoustic guitar, background vocals
- Bob Glaub — bass guitar
- Kenny Greenberg — electric guitar
- Jim Horn — horn, saxophone
- Wayne Jackson — horn
- Eric Johnson — guitar
- Booker T. Jones — organ, synthesizer, piano, background vocals
- Mary Ann Kennedy — background vocals
- David Lindley — guitar
- Dave Loggins — background vocals
- Randy McCormick — synthesizer
- Joann Neal — background vocals
- Dean Parks — guitar
- Mike Porter — percussion
- Michael Rhodes — upright bass, bass guitar
- Robert Sabino⁣ — synthesizer
- Ralph Schuckett — keyboards
- Steuart Smith — electric guitar
- Keith Sykes — background vocals
- Billy Joe Walker Jr. — electric guitar
- Roger "Rock" Williams — horn
- Peter Wood — organ, programming
- Pete Wosner — background vocals

Choir performed by 'Catch a Rising Choir' and brass ensemble is 'Uptown Horns'

== Chart performance ==
=== Album ===
Chart (1986)	Peak position
U.S. Billboard Top Country Albums	38
U.S. Billboard 200	177

=== Singles ===
Year	Single	Peak positions
Year	Single	US Country
1986	"Let Freedom Ring"	—
1986	"When I'm Free Again"	38
1987	"She Loves the Jerk"	71
1987	"Looking for You"	59
