= Above and Beyond (song) =

Single by Buck Owens
- B-side: "'Til These Dreams Come True"
- Released: March 7, 1960
- Genre: Country
- Length: 2:27
- Label: Capitol
- Songwriter: Harlan Howard
- Producer: Ken Nelson

Buck Owens singles chronology
"Under Your Spell Again" (1959)	"Above and Beyond" (1960)	"Excuse Me (I Think I've Got a Heartache)" (1960)

"Above and Beyond"

Single by Rodney Crowell

from the album Diamonds & Dirt
- B-side: "She Loves the Jerk"
- Released: June 1989 (U.S.)
- Recorded: November 1987
- Genre: Country
- Length: 2:28
- Label: Columbia
- Songwriter: Harlan Howard
- Producers: Tony Brown and Rodney Crowell

Rodney Crowell singles chronology
"After All This Time" (1989)	"Above and Beyond" (1989)	"Many a Long & Lonesome Highway" (1989)

"Above and Beyond", also known as "Above and Beyond (The Call of Love)", is a song written by Harlan Howard and first recorded by American country music singer Wynn Stewart. Stewart's 1959 single release on the Jackpot label did not chart. In 1960, Buck Owens released his own rendition on Capitol Records with "'Til These Dreams Come True" on the B-side, reaching No. 3 on the Billboard country singles charts that year.

In 1989, Rodney Crowell recorded a cover version on his album Diamonds & Dirt. This cover, released with "She Loves the Jerk" on the B-side, charted at No. 1 on the country chart in late 1989. It was the fifth consecutive No. 1 hit from the album, as well as the fifth and final No. 1 of his career.

In 2017, the song was covered by Rhonda Vincent and Daryle Singletary for their duets album American Grandstand.

== Chart performance ==
=== Buck Owens ===
Chart (1960)	Peak position
US Hot Country Songs (Billboard)	3
Canada (CHUM Chart)	8

=== Rodney Crowell ===
Chart (1989)	Peak position
Canada Country Singles (RPM)	1
US Hot Country Songs (Billboard)	1

==== Year-end charts ====
Chart (1989)	Position
Canada Country Tracks (RPM)	3
US Country Songs (Billboard)	6
