= Ashes by Now =

1980 single by Rodney Crowell

Single by Rodney Crowell

from the album But What Will the Neighbors Think
- B-side: "Blues in the Daytime"
- Released: April 1980
- Genre: Country
- Length: 4:11 (album version); 3:32 (single version)
- Label: Warner Bros.
- Songwriter: Rodney Crowell
- Producers: Rodney Crowell; Craig Leon

Rodney Crowell singles chronology
| "(Now and Then There's) A Fool Such as I" (1979) | "Ashes by Now" (1980) | "Ain't No Money" (1980) |

"Ashes by Now" is a song written by Rodney Crowell. It has since been recorded several times by various musical artists in the country music format. The song was first recorded by Crowell himself, eventually releasing it as a single in 1980.

== Rodney Crowell version ==
Crowell originally recorded "Ashes by Now" in January 1978 in Los Angeles, California. The recording session featured musician Ricky Skaggs playing the fiddle, among other prominent session musicians of the period.

Before its release as a single, it served as the b-side to his 1978 single "Elvira." The song was later re-released in April 1980 as the A-side single via Warner Bros. Records becoming a minor chart hit on the Billboard Hot Country Singles and Hot 100 that year. The song was included on Crowell's 1980 studio album But What Will the Neighbors Think.

The song was covered by Crowell's frequent collaborator Emmylou Harris on her 1981 album Evangeline.

=== Chart performance ===
| Chart (1980) | Peak position |
|---|---|
| US Hot Country Singles (Billboard) | 78 |
| US Billboard Hot 100 | 37 |

== Lee Ann Womack version ==
"Ashes by Now"

Single by Lee Ann Womack

from the album I Hope You Dance
- B-side: "Lonely Too"
- Released: October 9, 2000
- Studio: Sound Kitchen (Nashville, Tennessee); Javelina (Nashville, Tennessee)
- Genre: Country; country pop
- Length: 4:11
- Label: MCA Nashville
- Songwriter: Rodney Crowell
- Producer: Mark Wright

Lee Ann Womack singles chronology
| "I Hope You Dance" (2000) | "Ashes by Now" (2000) | "Why They Call It Falling" (2001) |

It was notably covered by Lee Ann Womack in 2000 and her version became the most commercially successful after also being issued as a single. Womack's rendition of the song was released on October 9, 2000 as the second single from her third studio album, I Hope You Dance (2000). This version peaked at number 4 on the US Billboard Hot Country Singles & Tracks chart, becoming her last top ten single until "I May Hate Myself in the Morning" (2004). It also hit number 45 on the US Billboard Hot 100. Bekka Bramlett notably provides background vocals on the track.

=== Critical reception ===
Editors at The Toronto Sun wrote, "A thorough makeover of the Rodney Crowell classic, from one of the exceedingly rare albums with the power to unite staunch old-timers and New Country types alike." Editors at Billboard wrote, "The inventive percussion that opens this terrific single is just the beginning of the magic that producer Mark Wright and Lee Ann Womack weave. One listen to this great single and it's obvious the song is sure to throw fuel on the fire."

=== Music video ===
A music video directed by Gregg Horne was created for Lee Ann Womack's version of the song.

=== Personnel ===
Credits adapted from I Hope You Dance liner notes.

- Bekka Bramlett — backing vocals
- Mark Casstevens — acoustic guitar
- Lisa Cochran — backing vocals
- Eric Darken — percussion
- Tabitha Fair — backing vocals
- Pat Flynn — acoustic guitar
- Larry Franklin — fiddle
- Paul Franklin — pedal steel guitar
- Marabeth Jordan — backing vocals
- Brent Mason — electric guitar
- Steve Nathan — keyboards
- Michael Omartian — accordion
- Glenn Worf — bass
- Lonnie Wilson — drums
- Lee Ann Womack — lead vocals

=== Charts ===
In the October 21, 2000 issue of Billboard, "Ashes by Now" debuted at number 49, becoming Womack's then-highest debut on the chart; it would be surpassed when "Finding My Way Back Home" debuted at number 46 in August 2006. The song would reach a peak of number 4 on March 3, 2001, becoming her penultimate top-ten single. A slip in its chart performance was attributed by Wade Jessen of Billboard to be due to the death of Dale Earnhardt.

| Chart (2000–2001) | Peak position |
|---|---|
| Canada Country Singles (RPM) | 41 (Note: "My Next Thirty Years" had not yet peaked when RPM ceased publication in November 2000.) |
| US Hot Country Songs (Billboard) | 4 |
| US Billboard Hot 100 | 45 |

=== Year-end charts ===
| Chart (2001) | Position |
|---|---|
| US Country Songs (Billboard) | 23 |
