= Jewel of the South =

Studio album by Rodney Crowell
- Released: June 20, 1995
- Genre: Country
- Length: 37:58
- Label: MCA
- Producer: Tony Brown; Rodney Crowell

Rodney Crowell chronology
| Let the Picture Paint Itself (1993) | Jewel of the South (1995) | Soul Searchin (1995) |

Jewel of the South is an album by the American country music artist Rodney Crowell. Released in 1995, it was his second and last album under the MCA Records label. Like its predecessor, it failed to chart on the Billboard Top Country Albums chart. Only one track, "Please Remember Me", was released as a single; it reached No. 69 on the Hot Country Songs chart. Tim McGraw would release a successful cover of the song on his 1999 album A Place in the Sun that hit No. 1 in the United States and Canada, as well as reaching No. 10 on The Billboard Hot 100.

During a 2008 interview, Crowell cited the track "Jewel of the South" as "one of the best songs" he has written and was surprised no other artist has covered it.

== Critical reception ==
Professional ratings
Review scores
| Source | Rating |
|---|---|
| AllMusic | 3/5 stars |
| The Encyclopedia of Popular Music | 3/5 stars |
| Entertainment Weekly | C+ |

AllMusic wrote that the album "emphasizes Crowell, the thoughtful songwriter, over Crowell the neo-honky tonk bandleader."

== Track listing ==
All songs composed by Rodney Crowell except when noted

1. "Say You Love Me" – 3:47
2. "Candy Man" (Neil Fredericks, Beverly "Ruby" Ross) – 3:03
3. "Please Remember Me" (Crowell, Will Jennings) – 3:45
4. "The Ballad of Possum Potez" – 3:29
5. "Thinking About Leaving" – 4:06
6. "The Ladder of Love" (Crowell, Lee Roy Parnell) – 2:54
7. "Just Say Yes" (Crowell, Keith Sykes) – 4:02
8. "Storm of Love" (Harlan Howard, Buck Owens) – 3:01
9. "Love to Burn" (Crowell, Hank DeVito, Jennings) – 3:26
10. "Jewel of the South" – 4:50
11. "Qué es amor (What Is Love)" (Crowell, Jennings, Roy Orbison) – 1:35

== Personnel ==
- Kenny Aronoff – drums
- Eddie Bayers – drums
- Barry Beckett – piano
- Richard Bennett – electric guitar
- Rosemary Butler – background vocals
- Max Carl – background vocals
- Jon Carroll – organ, piano
- Claudia Church – background vocals
- Mike Clarke – drums
- Rodney Crowell – acoustic guitar, lead vocals
- Béla Fleck – banjo
- Kim Fleming – background vocals
- Vince Gill – background vocals
- Mike Haynes – trumpet
- Jim Horn – saxophone
- John Jorgenson – electric guitar
- Tim Lauer – organ
- Albert Lee – electric guitar
- Mark Luna – background vocals
- Charlie McCoy – harmonica
- Raul Malo – background vocals
- Steve Nathan – organ, piano
- Bill Owsley – background vocals
- Alison Prestwood – bass guitar
- Carmella Ramsey – background vocals
- Michael Rhodes – bass guitar, fretless bass guitar
- Kim Richey – background vocals
- Chris Rodriguez – background vocals
- Matt Rollings – piano
- Steuart Smith – acoustic guitar, electric guitar
- Tommy Spurlock – steel guitar
- Michael Utley – organ
- Kenny Vaughan – electric guitar
- Hank DeVito – acoustic guitar
- Billy Joe Walker Jr. – electric guitar
- Willie Weeks – bass guitar, background vocals
