= I Couldn't Leave You If I Tried =

Single by Rodney Crowell

from the album Diamonds & Dirt
- B-side: "When the Blue Hour Comes"
- Released: May 1988
- Recorded: October 26, 1987
- Genre: Country
- Length: 3:17
- Label: Columbia
- Songwriter(s): Rodney Crowell
- Producer(s): Tony Brown and Rodney Crowell

Rodney Crowell singles chronology
""It's Such a Small World" (with Rosanne Cash) " (1988)	"I Couldn't Leave You If I Tried" (1988)	""She's Crazy for Leavin'" " (1988)

"I Couldn't Leave You If I Tried" is a song written and recorded by American country music artist Rodney Crowell. It was released in May 1988 as the second single from Crowell's album Diamonds & Dirt. the song was the second of Crowell's five number one country singles. The single went to number one for one week and spent a total of 13 weeks on the country chart.

== Charts ==
=== Weekly charts ===
Chart (1988)	Peak position
US Hot Country Songs (Billboard)	1
Canadian RPM Country Tracks	1

=== Year-end charts ===
Chart (1988)	Position
Canadian RPM Country Tracks	24
US Hot Country Songs (Billboard)	7
