= It's Such a Small World =

Single by Rodney Crowell with Rosanne Cash

from the album Diamonds & Dirt
- B-side: "Crazy Baby"
- Released: January 1988
- Genre: Country
- Length: 3:21
- Label: Columbia Nashville
- Songwriter(s): Rodney Crowell
- Producer(s): Tony Brown, Rodney Crowell

Rodney Crowell singles chronology
"Looking for You" (1987)	"It's Such a Small World" (1988)	"I Couldn't Leave You If I Tried" (1988)

Rosanne Cash singles chronology
"Tennessee Flat Top Box" (1987)	"It's Such a Small World" (1988)	"If You Change Your Mind" (1988)

"It's Such a Small World" is a song written by American country music artist Rodney Crowell, and recorded by Crowell and then-wife Rosanne Cash as a duet. It was released in January 1988 as the lead-off single from Crowell's Diamonds & Dirt album, which charted five No. 1 hits in between 1988 and 1989.

== Content ==
The song tells the story of two former lovers (or former spouses) who meet by chance in New York City, after having not seen one another in many years. They begin to reminisce, and eventually end up spending the night together. As this is happening, however, they are both clear that it is only a one-night-fling (and a chance to share one more time what they once had together), and not a renewal of their affair.

== Music video ==
The song was accompanied by a music video, directed by Edd Griles, which featured a few seconds of film taken on Cash and Crowell's actual honeymoon. The video follows the storyline of the song, except that after the man (played by Crowell) leaves the next morning, he changes his mind and returns to the woman (Cash).

== Charts ==
The song debuted at number 68 on the chart dated January 23, 1988 and charted for 18 weeks on the Billboard Hot Country Singles chart, reaching number 1 on the chart dated the week of April 30.

=== Weekly charts ===
Chart (1988)	Peak position
US Hot Country Songs (Billboard)	1
Canadian RPM Country Tracks	1

=== Year-end charts ===
Chart (1988)	Position
US Hot Country Songs (Billboard)	6
