= Diamonds & Dirt =

Studio album by Rodney Crowell
- Released: March 30, 1988
- Recorded: 1987
- Studios: Emerald Sound Studios, Nashville, Tennessee
- Genre: Country
- Length: 34:54
- Label: Columbia
- Producers: Rodney Crowell; Tony Brown

Rodney Crowell chronology
Street Language (1986)	Diamonds & Dirt (1988)	The Rodney Crowell Collection (1989)

Singles from Diamonds & Dirt
- 1. "It's Such a Small World" Released: January 1988; 2. "I Couldn't Leave You If I Tried" Released: May 1988; 3. "She's Crazy for Leavin'" Released: September 1988; 4. "After All This Time" Released: January 1989; 5. "Above and Beyond" Released: June 1989

Professional ratings
Review scores
Source	Rating
AllMusic	5/5 stars
The Encyclopedia of Popular Music	4/5 stars
The Rolling Stone Album Guide	4.5/5 stars

Diamonds & Dirt is the fifth studio album by American singer-songwriter Rodney Crowell, released in 1988. His fifth studio album, it was his second release for Columbia Records. The album was his most successful, achieving RIAA gold certification. All five of its singles reached nomber one on the Billboard country charts, setting a record for the most number-one hits from a country album. In order of release, they were "It's Such a Small World" (a duet with then-wife Rosanne Cash), "I Couldn't Leave You If I Tried", "She's Crazy for Leavin", "After All This Time", and a cover of Harlan Howard's "Above and Beyond (The Call of Love)".

The album was later reissued by Columbia Legacy with three bonus tracks.

== Production ==
Diamonds & Dirt was Crowell's first album recorded entirely in Nashville and the first aimed squarely at a country audience. It was produced by Tony Brown and Crowell.

== Critical reception ==
The Rolling Stone Album Guide called the album "a stirring treatise on the quest for understanding and balance in a relationship." No Depression wrote that the songs are "played by a band that, in its day, rivaled the Desert Rose Band and Dwight Yoakam’s backing unit as the tightest pseudo-honky-tonkers in country music." Reviewing the reissue, The A.V. Club wrote that the album "still sounds pretty good ... especially in light of the sort of unnatural, reverb-laden late-'80s production that makes everything go 'poof'." Spin deemed it "a traditional country record [on which Crowell] ends ups rocking harder than ever before."

== Track listing ==
All songs written by Rodney Crowell, except where noted.

No.	Title	Writer(s)	Length
1.	"Crazy Baby"	Crowell, Will Jennings	3:06
2.	"I Couldn't Leave You If I Tried"		3:17
3.	"She's Crazy for Leavin'"	Crowell, Guy Clark	3:16
4.	"After All This Time"		4:28
5.	"I Know You're Married"		3:31
6.	"Above and Beyond"	Harlan Howard	2:28
7.	"It's Such a Small World" (duet with Rosanne Cash)		3:21
8.	"I Didn't Know I Could Lose You"		3:21
9.	"Brand New Rag"	Crowell, Jennings	3:07
10.	"The Last Waltz"	Crowell, Jennings	5:21

Legacy reissue bonus tracks
No.	Title	Length
11.	"I've Got My Pride but I Got to Feed the Kids"	2:28
12.	"It's Lonely Out"	3:40
13.	"Lies Don't Lie"	3:04

== Personnel ==
- Eddie Bayers – drums
- Barry Beckett – piano, organ
- Rosanne Cash – background vocals
- Rodney Crowell – lead vocals, acoustic guitar
- Glen Duncan – fiddle
- Paul Franklin – steel guitar
- Vince Gill – background vocals
- Russ Kunkel – drums
- Mark O'Connor – fiddle, mandolin
- Michael Rhodes – bass guitar
- Vince Santoro – background vocals
- Preston Smith – harmonica, background vocals
- Steuart Smith – electric guitar

== Charts ==
=== Weekly charts ===
Chart (1988–89)	Peak position
Canadian Country Albums (RPM)	9
US Top Country Albums (Billboard)	8

=== Year-end charts ===
Chart (1988)	Position
US Top Country Albums (Billboard)	35
Chart (1989)	Position
US Top Country Albums (Billboard)	7
Chart (1990)	Position
US Top Country Albums (Billboard)	61
