= After All This Time (Rodney Crowell song) =

Single by Rodney Crowell

from the album Diamonds & Dirt
- B-side: "Oh King Richard"
- Released: January 1989
- Recorded: November 1987
- Genre: Country
- Length: 4:28
- Label: Columbia
- Songwriter: Rodney Crowell
- Producers: Tony Brown and Rodney Crowell

Rodney Crowell singles chronology
| "She's Crazy for Leavin'" (1988) | "After All This Time" (1989) | "Above and Beyond" (1989) |

"After All This Time" is a song written and recorded by American country music artist Rodney Crowell. It was released in January 1989 as the fourth single from the album Diamonds & Dirt. It was Crowell's seventh single to reach the U.S. country music chart and the fourth of five number ones. "After All This Time" spent one week at the top and 15 weeks on chart overall. It won a 1990 Grammy Award for Best Country Song. Contrary to popular belief, it took Crowell 4 years to complete the song.

Andy Williams covered this song on his 1991 album Nashville.

== Music video ==
The video for the song was directed by Bill Pope. It mainly features Crowell singing the song into a microphone against a black background and dressed in all black, with a few cut scenes of him in a cafe alone and noticing a waitress's name tag, only for her to comfort him (this makes him think of his lover who departed him) and him sitting on his couch tuning his guitar. It was nominated for the Country Music Association Award for Video of the Year.

== Chart performance ==
| Chart (1989) | Peak position |
|---|---|
| Canada Country Singles (RPM) | 1 |
| US Hot Country Songs (Billboard) | 1 |

=== Year-end charts ===
| Chart (1989) | Position |
|---|---|
| Canada Country Tracks (RPM) | 37 |
| US Country Songs (Billboard) | 22 |
