= Please Remember Me =

1995 single by Rodney Crowell

Single by Rodney Crowell

from the album Jewel of the South
- B-side: "Give My Heart a Rest"
- Released: 1995
- Genre: Country
- Length: 3:45
- Label: MCA
- Songwriters: Rodney Crowell; Will Jennings
- Producers: Tony Brown; Rodney Crowell

Rodney Crowell singles chronology
"I Don't Fall in Love So Easy" (1994)	"Please Remember Me" (1995)	"I Walk the Line Revisited" (1998)

"Please Remember Me" is a song co-written by American country music artist Rodney Crowell with lyricist Will Jennings. Originally recorded by Crowell for his 1995 album Jewel of the South, his version was released as its lead (and only) single and peaked at number 69 on the Billboard country chart in early June.

A later version was released by Aaron Neville and Linda Ronstadt, but was not released as a single.

== Chart performance ==
Chart (1995)	Peak position
US Hot Country Songs (Billboard)	69

== Tim McGraw version ==
"Please Remember Me"

Single by Tim McGraw

from the album A Place in the Sun
- B-side: For a Little While
- Released: March 22, 1999
- Genre: Country; country pop
- Length: 4:55
- Label: Curb
- Songwriters: Rodney Crowell; Will Jennings
- Producers: Byron Gallimore; Tim McGraw; James Stroud

Tim McGraw singles chronology
"For a Little While" (1998)	"Please Remember Me" (1999)	"Something Like That" (1999)

Music video
- "Please Remember Me" on YouTube

Four years after the release of Crowell's version, Tim McGraw covered the song for his 1999 album A Place in the Sun. Released that year as the first single from that album, McGraw's cover reached the top of the Billboard Hot Country Singles & Tracks (now Hot Country Songs) charts, a position that it held for five weeks. The song was also McGraw's biggest solo hit on the Billboard Hot 100, where it peaked at number 10. McGraw's rendition features Patty Loveless on harmony vocals.

=== Music video ===
The music video for McGraw's cover was directed by Randee St. Nicholas, and premiered on CMT on March 26, 1999, when CMT named it a "Hot Shot". In the video, McGraw sat on a bench in a beach, with the waves crashing, and showing clips from McGraw's previous videos, as well as McGraw singing in a mansion.

=== Critical reception ===
Deborah Evans Price, of Billboard magazine reviewed the song favorably, calling it a "lush and lovely ballad." She goes on to say that he is "surprisingly effective" on this pop-side release as he is usually best with traditional material. She finishes the review by saying that McGraw "seems to a newfound vocal maturity." Kevin John Coyne of Country Universe gave the song an A grade, calling it "a lush and gorgeous ballad that is elevated by a Patty Loveless harmony vocal." He goes on to say that McGraw's "pleading performance gives the song its urgency, and the pop-flavored production, complete with strings, harkens back to the glory days of the Nashville sound." The song ranks 96th on the RIAA 365 songs of the century list

=== Track listing ===
UK Promo CD

1. Please Remember Me 3:39

Cassette Single

- A Please Remember Me 4:29
- B For A Little While 3:33

US Single

1. Please Remember Me 4:29
2. For A Little While 3:33

=== Chart performance ===
"Please Remember Me" debuted at number 51 on the U.S. Billboard Hot Country Singles & Tracks for the week of March 20, 1999. It reached number one and remained there for five consecutive weeks until it was knocked off by "Write This Down" by George Strait.

Chart (1999)	Peak position
Canada Country Singles (RPM)	1
US Billboard Hot 100	10
US Hot Country Songs (Billboard)	1

==== End of year charts ====
Chart (1999)	Position
Canada Country Tracks (RPM)	35
US Billboard Hot 100	56
US Country Songs (Billboard)	5

=== Certifications ===
Certifications for Please Remember Me
Region	Certification	Certified units/sales
United States (RIAA)	Platinum	1,000,000^{‡}
^{‡} Sales+streaming figures based on certification alone.

== Covers ==
The Swedish country music-inspired dansband Lasse Stefanz recorded a Swedish version called "Tänk På Mig Ibland" on their 1996 album Dig Ska Jag Älska.

It was covered by John Barrowman on his 2007 album Another Side.

American Idol season 10 winner Scotty McCreery covered this song to be used as the goodbye/exit song on the 11th season of American Idol. It was released on March 8, 2012.

Performed by Danielle Bradbery on Season 4 of The Voice, Released: Jun 11, 2013.
