= Ain't Living Long Like This =

Studio album by Rodney Crowell
- Released: August 1978
- Genre: Country
- Length: 38:50
- Label: Warner Bros. Nashville
- Producer: Brian Ahern; Dave Nives (re-issue)

Rodney Crowell chronology
Ain't Living Long Like This (1978)	But What Will the Neighbors Think (1980)

Professional ratings
Review scores
Source	Rating
AllMusic	5/5 stars
Christgau's Record Guide	A−

Ain't Living Long Like This is the debut studio album by American country music singer-songwriter Rodney Crowell, released in 1978 by Warner Bros. Records. It failed to enter the Top Country Albums chart. The songs, "Elvira", "Song for the Life" and "(Now and Then There's) A Fool Such as I" were released as singles but they all failed to chart within the top 40. Despite this, Ain't Living Long Like This is considered one of Crowell's best and most influential albums. Brett Hartenbach of AllMusic said it "not only showcases his songwriting prowess, but also his ability to deliver a song, whether it's one of his own or the work of another writer." Most of the songs on this album were later covered by other artists including the Oak Ridge Boys and Alan Jackson. When the album was re-released in 2002 the font on the cover was enlarged to make it more legible.

== Content ==
Three of the tracks are cover songs:

- "Elvira" – Dallas Frazier, Elvira (1966)
- "(Now and Then, There's) A Fool Such as I" – Hank Snow (1952) [Covered by many other artists such as Elvis Presley, Bob Dylan, Eddy Arnold, Jim Reeves and Lou Rawls]
- "I Thought I Heard You Callin' My Name" – Norma Jean, Let's Go All the Way (1965)

Many Crowell-penned songs have since been covered by other artists. "Leaving Louisiana in the Broad Daylight" was covered by Emmylou Harris in 1978 and, a year later, by The Oak Ridge Boys from The Oak Ridge Boys Have Arrived. Their version was released as a single, reaching #1 on the Hot Country Songs chart.

"Voila, An American Dream" was covered (as "An American Dream") by The Nitty Gritty Dirt Band and was the title track to their 1979 album. Released as a single, the record hit #13 on the U.S. Hot 100 and #3 in Canada.

"I Ain't Living Long Like This" was recorded in 1977 by Gary Stewart for his album, Your Place or Mine., then recorded in 1978 by Emmylou Harris for her album, Quarter Moon in a Ten Cent Town, and in 1979 by Waylon Jennings for his album, What Goes Around Comes Around, and Jerry Jeff Walker for his album, Too Old to Change. Andy Griggs recorded a version for his 1999 first album, You Won't Ever Be Lonely. Brooks & Dunn recorded a version in 2003 as a tribute to Jennings.

"Baby, Better Start Turnin' 'Em Down" was covered by Emmylou Harris on her 1983 album White Shoes and by Rosanne Cash on her 1979 album Right or Wrong. "Song for the Life" was first covered in 1976 by Jonathan Edwards, in 1980 by John Denver and in 1982 by Waylon Jennings. Alan Jackson released his version as a single from his 1994 album Who I Am, where it became a top ten country hit.

Willie Nelson, Ricky Skaggs, Emmylou Harris and Nicolette Larson sang background vocals on several of the tracks.

== Track listing ==
All tracks composed by Rodney Crowell; except where indicated
Side 1

1. "Elvira" (Dallas Frazier) – 4:26
2. "(Now and Then There's) A Fool Such as I" (Bill Trader) – 3:14
3. "Leaving Louisiana in the Broad Daylight" (Donivan Cowart, Rodney Crowell) – 3:26
4. "Voilá, An American Dream" – 3:53
5. "I Ain't Living Long Like This" – 5:04

Side 2

1. "Baby, Better Start Turnin' 'Em Down" – 4:31
2. "Song for the Life" – 4:43
3. "I Thought I Heard You Callin' My Name" (Lee Emerson) – 3:13
4. "California Earthquake (A Whole Lotta Shakin' Goin' On)" – 6:20

== Personnel ==
- Rodney Crowell – vocals, acoustic guitar

Additional musicians

- Brian Ahern – acoustic guitar, percussion
- Byron Berline – fiddle, violin
- Hal Blaine – drums
- James Burton – Dobro, electric guitar, acoustic guitar
- Ry Cooder – acoustic and slide guitar
- Donivan Cowart – background vocals
- Hank DeVito – steel guitar
- Dr. John – keyboards
- Amos Garrett – acoustic and electric guitar
- John Goldthwaite – electric guitar
- Emory Gordy Jr. – bass guitar
- Richard Greene – strings
- Glen Hardin – piano
- Emmylou Harris – acoustic guitar, electric guitar, background vocals
- Jerry Jumonville – horns, saxophone
- Jim Keltner – drums
- Nicolette Larson – background vocals
- Albert Lee – electric guitar, mandolin, piano, acoustic guitar, background vocals
- Willie Nelson – background vocals
- Mickey Raphael – harmonica
- Tom Sauber – banjo
- Ricky Skaggs – fiddle, violin, background vocals
- John Ware – percussion, drums
- Larry Willoughby – background vocals
