= She's Crazy for Leavin' =

Single by Rodney Crowell

from the album Diamonds & Dirt
- B-side: "Brand New Rag"
- Released: September 1988
- Recorded: November 1987
- Genre: Country
- Length: 3:16
- Label: Columbia
- Songwriter(s): Rodney Crowell and Guy Clark
- Producer(s): Tony Brown and Rodney Crowell

Rodney Crowell singles chronology
"I Couldn't Leave You If I Tried" (1988)	"She's Crazy for Leavin'" (1988)	"After All This Time" (1989)

"She's Crazy for Leavin'" is a song co-written by American country music artists and songwriters Rodney Crowell and Guy Clark. Crowell released the song in September 1988 as the third single from the album Diamonds & Dirt. The song was Crowell's second number one country hit as a solo artist. The single went to number one for one week and spent a total of 14 weeks on the country chart.

It was originally recorded by Clark on his 1981 album The South Coast of Texas, which Crowell produced.

The song was also recorded by Steve Wariner and appeared on his 1985 album Life's Highway but was never released as a single.

== Chart performance ==
Chart (1988–1989)	Peak position
US Hot Country Songs (Billboard)	1
Canadian RPM Country Tracks	1

=== Year-end charts ===
Chart (1989)	Position
Canada Country Tracks (RPM)	50
US Country Songs (Billboard)	80
