= Rodney Crowell (album) =

Studio album by Rodney Crowell
- Released: 1981
- Genre: Country, country rock, rock
- Length: 35:57
- Label: Warner Bros. Nashville
- Producer: Rodney Crowell

Rodney Crowell chronology
But What Will the Neighbors Think (1980)	Rodney Crowell (1981)	Street Language (1986)

Professional ratings
Review scores
Source	Rating
AllMusic	3.5/5 stars
Robert Christgau	C+

Rodney Crowell is the third studio album by American country music artist Rodney Crowell. It was released in 1981 (see 1981 in country music) by Warner Bros. Records and was his last album on that label before switching to Columbia. It was the first album Crowell produced by himself. It reached No. 47 on the Top Country Albums chart and No. 105 on the Billboard 200 albums chart. The songs, "Stars on the Water" and "Victim or a Fool" were released as singles. "Stars on the Water" reached No. 30 on the Hot Country Songs chart, his highest-charting song up to that point. It peaked at No. 21 on the Canadian country charts. "Victim or a Fool" reached No. 34 in the U.S. The album was rereleased on compact disc in 2005 paired with his previous album But What Will the Neighbors Think.

== Content ==
"She Ain't Goin' Nowhere" was written and recorded by Guy Clark in 1975 for his debut album Old No. 1. Later versions of the song change the "Goin'" to "going".

"Old Pipeliner" was first recorded in 1967 by Red Sovine on his album Dear John Letter. “Pipeliner Blues” AKA “Old Pipeliner” was written, published, and first recorded in 1940 by, piano playing Grand Ole Opry Star, Moon Mullican.

The opening track, "Stars on the Water" was first covered in 1983 by Jimmy Buffett on his album One Particular Harbour. George Strait included a cover on his album The Road Less Traveled in 2001.

"Shame on the Moon" was covered in 1982 by Mac Davis and Bob Seger & the Silver Bullet Band. The latter released the song as a single from their album The Distance where it became a No. 2 hit. Tanya Tucker also covered the song in 1983 for her album Changes.

"'Til I Gain Control Again" had been recorded by Emmylou Harris on her 1975 album Elite Hotel, by Waylon Jennings on his 1977 album Ol' Waylon, and by Willie Nelson on Willie and Family Live. It became a number 1 hit for Crystal Gayle in late 1982. In 1993, the song was covered by Canadian country rock band Blue Rodeo for their album Five Days in July. Released as a single in 1994, the song peaked at number 24 on the RPM Country Tracks chart. Guitarist Albert Lee would record a version in 2002 for his album Albert Lee & Hogan's Heroes.

== Track listing ==
All tracks composed by Rodney Crowell; except where indicated

No.	Title	Writer(s)	Length
1.	"Stars on the Water"		3:47
2.	"Just Wanta Dance"	Keith Sykes	2:27
3.	"She Ain't Going Nowhere"	Guy Clark	3:51
4.	"Don't Need No Other Now"		3:25
5.	"Shame on the Moon"		4:44
6.	"Only Two Hearts"	Crowell, Hank DeVito	2:56
7.	"Victim or a Fool"		3:00
8.	"All You've Got to Do"	Crowell, DeVito	3:34
9.	"'Til I Gain Control Again"		5:11
10.	"Old Pipeliner"	Tommy Hill, Ray King	3:02

== Personnel ==
- Richard Bennett - acoustic guitar, electric guitar
- Tony Brown - piano, electric piano, keyboards, background vocals
- Rosemary Butler - background & harmony vocals
- Rosanne Cash - background & harmony vocals
- Rodney Crowell - lead vocals, acoustic guitar
- Hank DeVito - electric guitar, steel guitar, slide guitar
- Vince Gill - acoustic guitar, electric guitar, harmony & background vocals
- Emory Gordy Jr. - acoustic guitar, bass guitar, piano, upright bass, electric guitar, piano, string arrangements
- Booker T. Jones - organ, piano, keyboards
- Phil Kenzie - horns, saxophone
- Bill Lamb - horn
- Albert Lee - acoustic guitar, electric guitar, piano, harmony & background vocals
- Larrie Londin - drums, percussion
- Larry Willoughby - background & harmony vocals

== Chart performance ==
=== Album ===
Chart (1981)	Peak position
U.S. Billboard Top Country Albums	47
U.S. Billboard 200	105
Australia (Kent Music Report)	63

=== Singles ===
Year	Single	Peak chart positions			
Year	Single	US Country	US	AUS	CAN Country
1981	"Stars on the Water"	30	105	39	21
1981	"Victim or a Fool"	34	—	—	—
