= But What Will the Neighbors Think =

Studio album by Rodney Crowell
- Released: 1980
- Genre: Country
- Length: 37:38
- Label: Warner Bros. Nashville
- Producers: Rodney Crowell; Craig Leon

Rodney Crowell chronology
Ain't Living Long Like This (1978)	But What Will the Neighbors Think (1980)	Rodney Crowell (1981)

Professional ratings
Review scores
Source	Rating
AllMusic	3/5 stars

But What Will the Neighbors Think is the second studio album by American country music artist Rodney Crowell. It was released in 1980 (see 1980 in country music) by Warner Bros. Records. It reached No. 64 on the Top Country Albums chart and No. 155 on the Billboard 200 albums chart. The songs, "Ashes by Now", "Ain't No Money" and "Here Come the 80's" were released as singles. "Ashes by Now" reached No. 78 on the country charts and No. 37 on the Billboard Hot 100 while the other two singles failed to chart. The album has more of a rock & roll influence than Crowell's debut, Ain't Living Long Like This. The album was rereleased on compact disc in 2005.

== Content ==
The song "Queen of Hearts" was first recorded in 1979 by Welsh rock musician Dave Edmunds for his album Repeat When Necessary. It was also a single for Juice Newton, whose version was a number 2 hit on the Billboard Hot 100 in 1981.

Most of the songs on this album were later covered by other country artists. "Ain't No Money" was covered in 1982 by Crowell's then wife, Rosanne Cash on her album, Somewhere in the Stars. "It's Only Rock & Roll" was covered in 1983 by both Emmylou Harris and Waylon Jennings on their respective albums White Shoes and It's Only Rock & Roll.

"On a Real Good Night" was written by Crowell but was first recorded by Bobby Bare for his 1978 album Sleep Wherever I Fall. Albert Lee, who played guitar for this album, performed the song on his 1979 album Hiding.

Emmylou Harris covered "Ashes by Now" on her 1981 album Evangeline. It is also featured on Lee Ann Womack's album I Hope You Dance. Guy Clark later recorded his own version of "Heartbroke", which he wrote, for his 1981 album South Coast of Texas. In 1982, George Strait recorded a version for his second album Strait from the Heart. The song became a number-one hit for Ricky Skaggs in 1982.

== Track listing ==
All tracks written by Rodney Crowell unless noted

1. "Here Come the 80's" – 4:15
2. "Ain't No Money" – 3:58
3. "Oh What a Feeling" (Keith Sykes) – 2:58
4. "It's Only Rock & Roll" – 3:18
5. "On a Real Good Night" – 3:54
6. "Ashes by Now" – 4:07
7. "Heartbroke" (Guy Clark) – 3:33
8. "Queen of Hearts" (Hank DeVito) – 3:38
9. "Blues in the Daytime" – 4:19
10. "The One About England" – 3:38

== Personnel ==
- Hank DeVito – steel guitar
- Amos Garrett – acoustic guitar
- Emory Gordy Jr. – bass guitar
- Albert Lee – guitar, piano, background vocals
- Craig Leon – flute, piano
- Tony Brown – piano
- Larrie Londin – drums
- Frank Reckard – guitar
- Tower of Power – horns
- Don Whaley – background vocals
- Larry Willoughby – background vocals
- Steve Wood – keyboards, background vocals

== Chart performance ==
=== Album ===
Chart (1980)	Peak position
U.S. Billboard Top Country Albums	64
U.S. Billboard 200	155

=== Singles ===
Year	Single	Peak positions	
Year	Single	US Country	US
1980	"Ashes by Now"	78	37
1980	"Ain't No Money"	—	—
1980	"Here Come the 80's"	—	—
