= Hank DeVito =

- Born: Henry M. DeVito
- Genres: Rock; country
- Occupation: Musician
- Instrument: Pedal steel guitar
- Years active: 1968–present

Henry M. "Hank" DeVito is an American musician and photographer known primarily for his pedal steel guitar work and songwriting.

== Biography ==
After high school, DeVito attended the School of Visual Arts in New York City. He studied graphic arts and intended to pursue a career as a graphic designer. But he also began playing music gigs in 1968.

=== The New York Rock and Roll Ensemble ===
In 1970, DeVito joined the New York Rock & Roll Ensemble which also included Michael Kamen, Mark Snow, and Dorian Rudnytsky.

=== Emmylou Harris Hot Band ===
DeVito was an original member of Emmylou Harris's Hot Band, along with James Burton (electric guitar), Glen Hardin (piano), Rodney Crowell (acoustic guitar), John Ware (drums), and Emory Gordy Jr. (bass). In 2004, Emmylou and the Hot Band original members (including DeVito) reunited for an evening when Emmylou was awarded the ASCAP Founders Award.

=== The Cherry Bombs ===
DeVito was also an original member of the Hot Band offshoot The Cherry Bombs, a band formed to support Rodney Crowell and Rosanne Cash on tour in the early 1980s. Besides DeVito, the band included Vince Gill (guitar), Tony Brown (keyboards), Larrie Londin (drums), and Emory Gordy Jr. (bass). In 2003, they reunited to record the Notorious Cherry Bombs album.

=== Session work ===
As a session musician, DeVito worked with Hoyt Axton, Arlo Guthrie, Tim Krekel, Nicolette Larson, Ralph McTell, Buck Owens, Ricky Skaggs, George Strait, and others.

=== Songwriting ===
DeVito has written many songs, and a number of them were successful. Examples include "If You Change Your Mind" by Rosanne Cash, "Blue Side of Town" by Patty Loveless and "Queen of Hearts" by both Dave Edmunds and Juice Newton.

=== Photography ===
Parallel to his music career, DeVito has also been an accomplished photographer, inspired by Berenice Abbott and Walker Evans. One of his photos, used as an album cover for "King's Record Shop" by Rosanne Cash in 1987 won a Grammy Award. His photographs of Nashville images have been displayed at the Tennessee State Museum and other museums and galleries.
