= Rodney Crowell =

American country music singer and songwriter (born 1950)

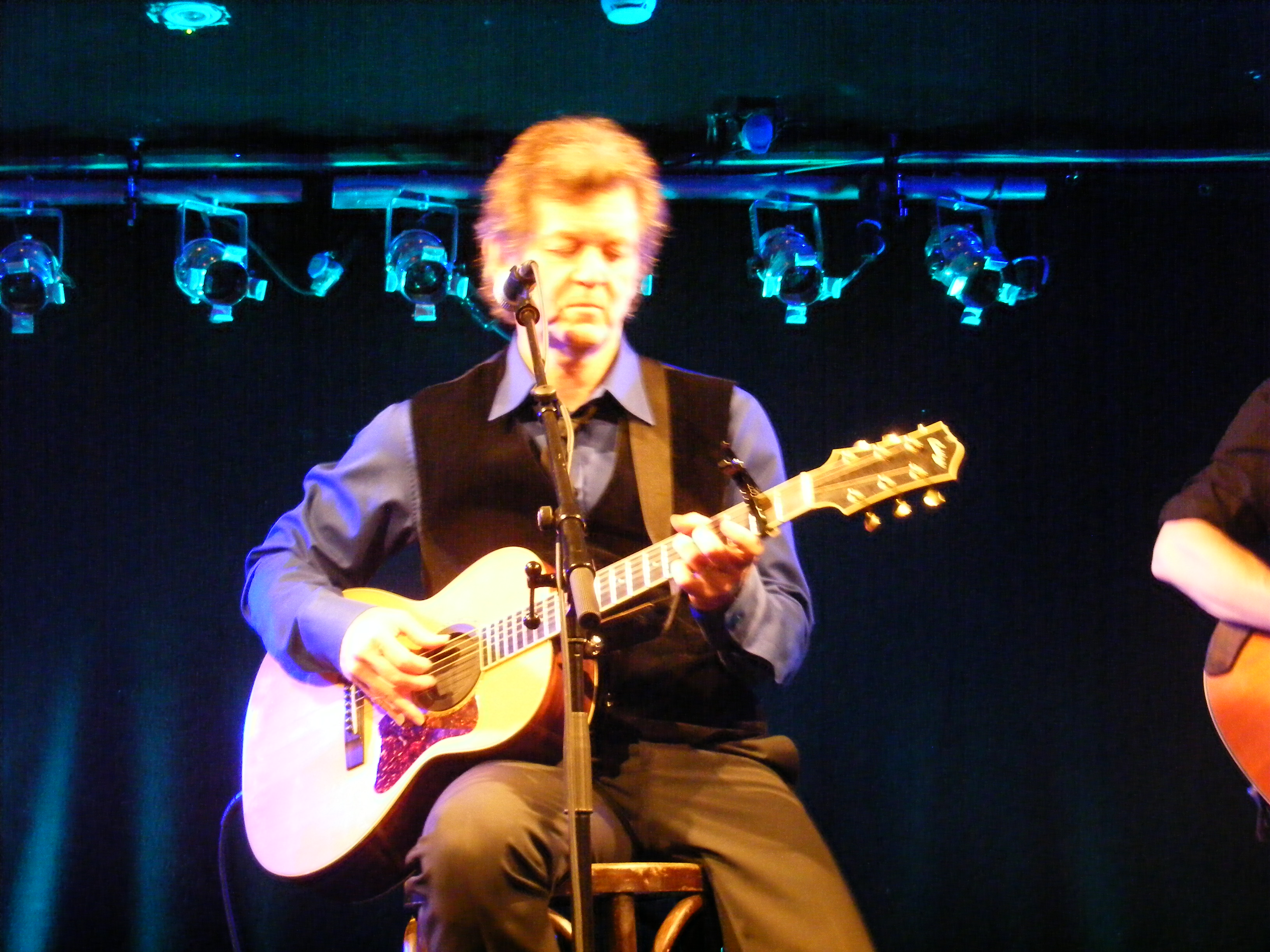
- Crowell onstage at Whelan's, Dublin, 2009

Background information
- Born: August 7, 1950 (age 76); Houston, Texas, U.S.
- Origin: Jacinto City, Texas, U.S.
- Genre: Country
- Occupations: Singer-songwriter, record producer, performer, music director
- Instruments: Vocals guitar
- Years active: 1972–present
- Labels: Warner Bros., Columbia, MCA, Sugar Hill, Epic, Yep Roc, Vanguard, New West
- Formerly of: The Notorious Cherry Bombs
- Spouses: Rosanne Cash (m. 1979; div. 1992) Claudia Church (m. 1998)
- Website: rodneycrowell.com

Rodney Crowell (born August 7, 1950) is an American musician, known primarily for his work as a singer and songwriter in country music. Crowell has had five number one singles on Hot Country Songs, all from his 1988 album Diamonds & Dirt. He has also written songs and produced for other artists.

He was influenced by songwriters Guy Clark and Townes Van Zandt. Crowell played guitar and sang for three years in Emmylou Harris' Hot Band.

He has won two Grammy Awards in his career, one in 1990 for Best Country Song for the song "After All This Time" and one in 2014 Best Americana Album for his album Old Yellow Moon.

== Early life ==
Crowell on Bookbits radio.

Crowell was born on August 7, 1950, in Houston, Texas, to James Walter Crowell and Addie Cauzette Willoughby.

He came from a musical family, with one grandfather being a church choir leader and the other a bluegrass banjo player. His grandmother played guitar, and his father sang semi-professionally at bars and honky tonks. At age 11, he started playing drums in his father's band. In his teenage years, he played in various garage rock bands in Houston, performing hits of the day alongside a few country numbers.

== Career ==
=== 1972–1986: Early career ===
In August 1972, he moved to Nashville, Tennessee, in search of a musical career and got a job as a songwriter after being discovered by Jerry Reed. He later met and befriended fellow songwriter Guy Clark, who became a major influence on his songwriting and vice versa. While there, he said, "I got a real cold splash in the face of what real songwriting is about. I started filling my mind with as many symbols and images as I could. I started reading. I got real hungry to have something to contribute". Emmylou Harris had recorded one of Crowell's songs, "Bluebird Wine", on her Pieces of the Sky album and requested to meet him. After he sat in with Harris at her gig at the Armadillo World Headquarters in early January 1975, she asked him to play rhythm guitar in her backing band, The Hot Band. He accepted and left the following day to join Harris in Los Angeles.

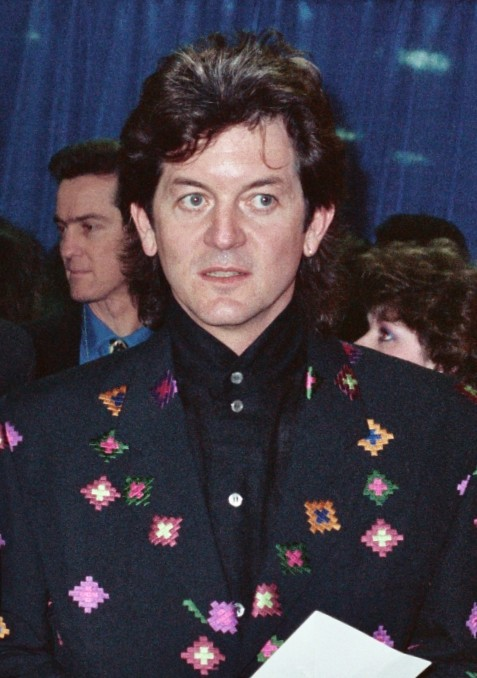
Crowell at the Grammy Awards in February 1990

In 1977, as a side project, he formed a musical group, The Cherry Bombs, together with Vince Gill, Tony Brown, and others. One year later, he signed a solo deal with Warner Bros. Records and in August 1978, released his debut album, Ain't Living Long Like This.

His debut album, as well as his following two albums, But What Will the Neighbors Think and Rodney Crowell, were not commercially successful despite garnering a huge cult following. Crowell himself criticized his debut album for not translating onto vinyl the same clarity and energy he felt in the studio. His single "Ashes by Now" from "But What Will the Neighbors Think" reached No. 37 on the Billboard Hot 100 in 1980.

Though he had already several country hits by artists covering his songs (including "I Ain't Living Long Like This" by Waylon Jennings, "Leaving Louisiana..." by the Oak Ridge Boys, and several covers by Johnny Cash, Rosanne Cash, Emmylou Harris, Jerry Reed and others), Crowell got his first big taste of pop songwriting success with "Shame on the Moon". "Shame on the Moon" was recorded on the 1982 album The Distance by Bob Seger & the Silver Bullet Band. Glenn Frey joined Seger on background harmony on the song. Appealing to a broad cross-section of listeners, the song spent four weeks at number two on the Billboard Hot 100 pop singles chart, topped the adult contemporary chart, and placed in the Top 15 of the country chart in early 1983. The song's dark, poetic and hypnotic style helped boost Crowell's cult status.

The album Rodney Crowell was released in 1981 (see 1981 in country music) by Warner Bros. Records and was his last album on that label before switching to Columbia. It was also the first album Crowell produced by himself. The album reached No. 47 on the Top Country Albums chart and No. 105 on the Billboard 200 albums chart. The songs "Stars on the Water" and "Victim or a Fool" were released as singles. "Stars on the Water" reached No. 30 on the Hot Country Songs chart, Crowell's highest charting song up to that point. It peaked at No. 21 on the Canadian country charts. "Victim or a Fool" reached No. 34 in the U.S.

In 1981, Crowell put his career on hold to produce several of his wife Rosanne Cash's albums.

In 1983, Crystal Gayle had a number one country single with his song "'Til I Gain Control Again" from her first Elektra album, True Love. The song was first recorded in 1975 by Emmylou Harris and appeared on Elite Hotel that year.

In 1984, Crowell returned to working on his own music career and recorded what was to be a new album for Warner Bros., Street Language. That album, a pop-sounding effort co–produced by David Malloy, was rejected by Warner Bros and never released. Warner Bros. requested a more Nashville-friendly record, but Crowell negotiated a release from his contract and moved to Columbia Records.

=== 1986–1995: Columbia Records and mainstream success ===
After producing Rosanne Cash's Rhythm & Romance, Crowell signed to Columbia Records in 1986. His first album for that label was reworked Street Language, co-produced with Booker T. Jones and featuring a blend of soul and country music. The album did not chart.

Although best known as a songwriter and alternative country artist, Crowell enjoyed mainstream popularity during the late 1980s and early 1990s. His critically acclaimed 1988 album, Diamonds & Dirt, produced five consecutive No. 1 singles during 17 months in 1988 and 1989: "It's Such a Small World" (a duet with Cash), "I Couldn't Leave You If I Tried," "She's Crazy For Leavin'," "After All This Time" and "Above and Beyond" (a cover of Buck Owens' 1962 hit). Crowell's "After All This Time" won the 1990 Grammy Award for Best Country Song. His follow-up album, 1989's Keys to the Highway, produced two top 5 hits in 1990, which were "Many a Long & Lonesome Highway" and "If Looks Could Kill."

After 1992's Life Is Messy, he left Columbia Records and signed to MCA Records, where he released two more albums — Let the Picture Paint Itself and Jewel of the South.

=== 2001–2010: Songwriting success, critical acclaim ===
Crowell continued to enjoy success as a songwriter in the 1990s and 2000s. Several of Crowell's songs became Top Ten country hits during this period, including "Song for the Life" by Alan Jackson, "Making Memories of Us" by Keith Urban, "Ashes by Now" by Lee Ann Womack, and "Please Remember Me" by Tim McGraw.

In 2001, after a brief hiatus from recording, Crowell released The Houston Kid on Sugar Hill Records, his first studio album since 1995's Jewel of the South. Many songs on the album were semi-autobiographical, and the album included a duet Crowell had recorded and released as a single in 1998 with his ex-father-in-law Johnny Cash, "I Walk the Line Revisited". Crowell followed up this effort with Fate's Right Hand in 2003 and The Outsider in 2005, both of which appeared on Columbia Nashville, a division of Sony Music. Leading critics and Crowell consider these three albums his finest solo work.

Rodney Crowell was inducted into the Nashville Songwriters Hall of Fame in 2003 with fellow inductees Hal Blair, Paul Overstreet and John Prine.

2004 saw the release of The Notorious Cherry Bombs, a reunion of Crowell's 1970s road band, including Vince Gill and Tony Brown. The future Keith Urban hit "Making Memories of Us" was included on this disc. In 2005, Crowell served as producer for established Irish singer-songwriter Kieran Goss on the album "Blue Sky Sunrise".

In 2007, Rodney Crowell was inducted into the Music City Walk of Fame.

Crowell released his next album, Sex & Gasoline, on Yep Roc Records in 2008, ending his relationship with Sony Music. The album received a Grammy nomination for Best Contemporary Folk/Americana Album. Crowell figures prominently in musician-neuroscientist Daniel Levitin's book The World in Six Songs for which he was interviewed, and three Crowell songs, "Shame On The Moon," "I Know Love Is All I Need" and "I Walk the Line (Revisited)" are featured in the book.

In 2009, Crowell wrote Wynonna Judd's title track to her album Sing: Chapter 1, which was also released in 2009. The song was given several electronic dance music remixes and sent to dance radio as Judd's second release from the album. In August 2009, the single reached No. 4 on the U.S. Billboard Hot Dance Club Songs chart.

Crowell produced Chely Wright's 2009 album, Lifted Off the Ground. Wright also made a cameo appearance in Crowell's 2008 music video for his single "Sex and Gasoline".

=== 2011–present ===
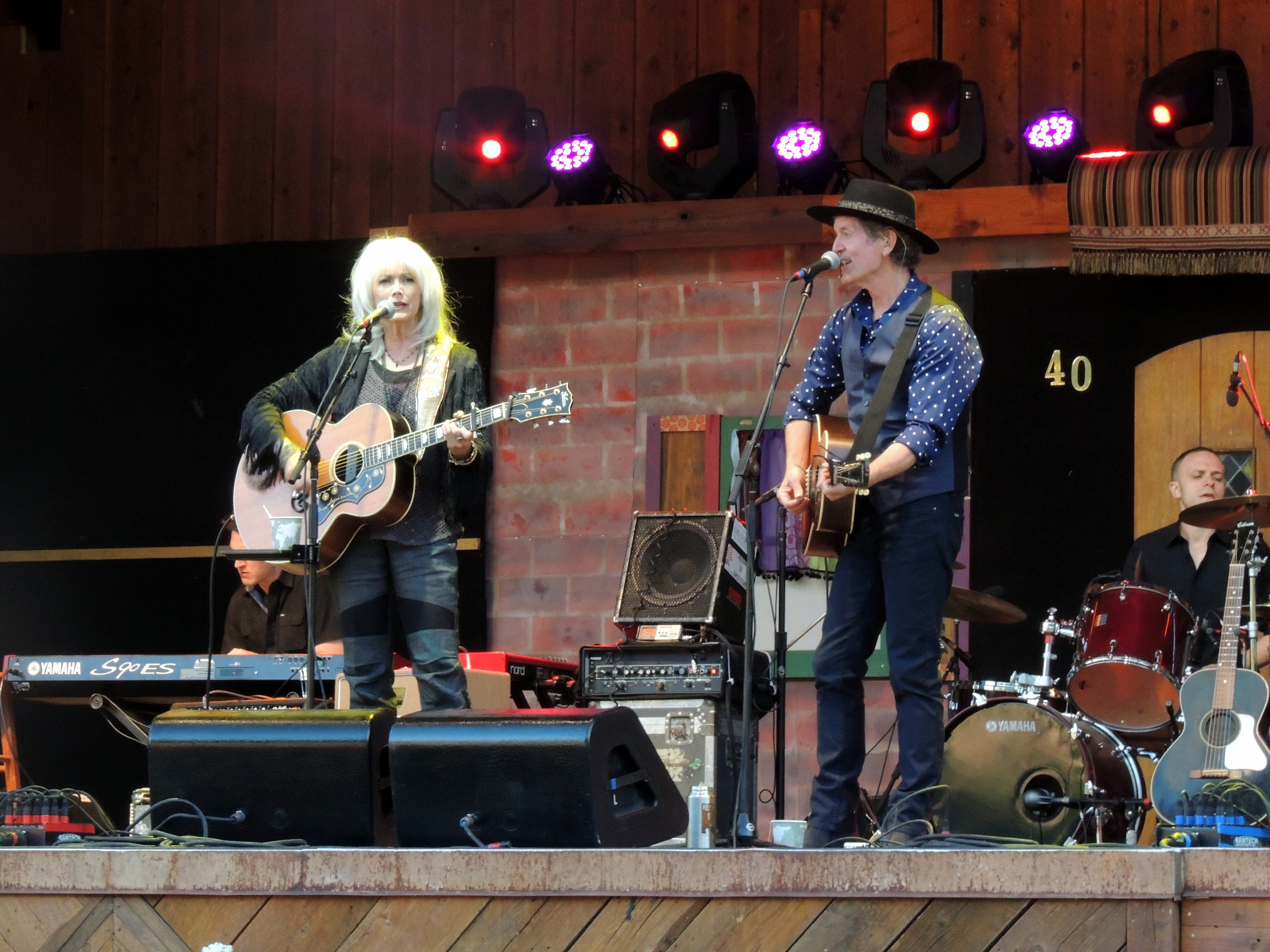
Crowell is known for his decades-long association with Emmylou Harris, performing as a member of her famous Hot Band in the 1970s, and recording two duet albums with her in the 2010s.

Vintage Books published Crowell's memoir, Chinaberry Sidewalks, in 2011. "Chinaberry Sidewalks" focuses primarily on Crowell's relationship with his parents’ marriage and his own early years growing up in Houston, Texas.

In 2012, Vanguard Records released KIN: Songs by Rodney Crowell and Mary Karr. Karr wrote the lyrics, and Crowell set them to music. KIN was Karr's first foray into songwriting. Crowell performed four tracks on the album; one as a duet with Kris Kristofferson. A variety of other artists recorded the other songs on the album, including Norah Jones, Vince Gill, Lucinda Williams, Lee Ann Womack, Rosanne Cash, Kris Kristofferson and Emmylou Harris.

On February 26, 2013, Crowell and Harris released Old Yellow Moon on Harris' longtime label Nonesuch Records. The album reached Number 4 on Billboard's Country albums chart and Number 29 on the Billboard Hot 200 charts. In 2013, the album won the Americana Music Awards' Album of the Year award, and Crowell and Harris were named group/duo of the year. On January 26, 2014, Crowell won his second Grammy Award when Old Yellow Moon won the Grammy for Best Americana Album. On May 11, 2015, Crowell and Harris released The Traveling Kind on Nonesuch Records.

Crowell released his first album on New West Records, Tarpaper Sky, on April 15, 2014. Crowell co-produced the record with his long-time collaborator, Steuart Smith. In the fall of 2014, Crowell was hired as music director for the Hank Williams biopic I Saw the Light.

In 2015, Crowell provided background vocals on "It Doesn't Hurt Right Now", a song he co-wrote with Jewel for her album Picking Up the Pieces as well as on "Holy War", a track which appears on I Am the Rain, a 2016 album by Chely Wright. On December 20, 2016, Crowell released a music video for the song "It Ain't Over Yet", which features guest vocals from Rosanne Cash and John Paul White as well as harmonica from Mickey Raphael. The song appears on his album Close Ties, which was released in 2017. The album also features a duet with Sheryl Crow titled "I'm Tied To Ya".

In 2019, Crowell received the Poet's Award from the Academy of Country Music for his achievements in songwriting. He also released a collaborative album, titled TEXAS on August 15, 2019.

In 2023, Crowell appeared in the movie All Happy Families.

== Personal life ==
In 1975, Crowell married Martha Dant Watts, and their daughter, Hannah, was born in May 1976. The brief marriage ended in divorce, with Crowell retaining custody of Hannah.

Crowell was subsequently married to Rosanne Cash (daughter of Johnny Cash) from 1979 to 1992, and they influenced each other's careers, with Crowell producing most of her albums during that period and her success influencing his songwriting. They collaborated on a number of duets, including 1988's "It's Such a Small World." Although Crowell and Cash are now divorced, they remain on friendly terms, performing together occasionally. Crowell and Cash have three daughters: Caitlin (b. 1980), Chelsea (b. 1982), and Carrie (b. 1988).

In 1998, Crowell married singer Claudia Church. The couple resides just south of Nashville.

== Awards and nominations ==
Americana Music Honors & Awards

Year	Nominated work	Award	Result
2004	"Fate's Right Hand"	Song of the Year	Won
2004	"Fate's Right Hand"	Album of the Year	Nominated
2006	"The Outsider"	Album of the Year	Nominated
2006	"Don't Get Me Started"	Song of the Year	Nominated
2006	Rodney Crowell	Lifetime Achievement Award in Songwriting	Won
2009	"Sex and Gasoline"	Song of the Year	Nominated
2013	"Old Yellow Moon" (with Emmylou Harris)	Album of the Year	Won
2013	Rodney Crowell & Emmylou Harris	Best Duo/Group	Won
2016	Rodney Crowell & Emmylou Harris	Best Duo/Group	Won
2017	"It Ain't Over Yet"	Song of the Year	Won
2017	"Close Ties"	Album of the Year	Nominated

Academy of Country Music Awards

Year	Nominated work	Award	Result
1981	"Seven Year Ache"	Single Record of the Year (producer)	Nominated
1981	"Seven Year Ache"	Album of the Year (producer)	Nominated
1988	Rodney Crowell & Rosanne Cash	Top Vocal Duet	Nominated
1988	Rodney Crowell	Top New Male Vocalist	Won
1989	Rodney Crowell	Top Male Vocalist	Nominated
1989	"After All This Time"	Song of the Year (artist)	Nominated
1989	"Diamonds & Dirt"	Album of the Year	Nominated
1999	"Please Remember Me"	Song of the Year	Nominated
2019	Rodney Crowell	Poet's Award	Won

ASCAP Country Music Awards

Year	Nominated work	Award	Result
2017	Rodney Crowell	Founder's Award	Won

Country Music Association Awards

Year	Nominated work	Award	Result
1988	"Diamonds & Dirt"	Album of the Year	Nominated
1988	Rodney Crowell & Rosanne Cash	Vocal Event of the Year	Nominated
1989	Rodney Crowell	Male Vocalist of the Year	Nominated
1989	"After All This Time"	Single of the Year	Nominated
1989	"After All This Time"	Song of the Year	Nominated
1989	"After All This Time"	Video of the Year	Nominated
1990	Rodney Crowell	Male Vocalist of the Year	Nominated
1999	"Please Remember Me" (with Will Jennings)	Song of the Year	Nominated

Grammy Awards

Year	Nominated work	Award	Result
1986	"I Don't Know Why You Don't Want Me" (with Rosanne Cash)	Best Country Song	Nominated
1989	"I Couldn't Leave You If I Tried"	Best Country Song	Nominated
1990	"After All This Time"	Best Country Song	Won
2005	"It's Hard to Kiss The Lips at Night That Chew Your Ass Out All Day Long" (with Vince Gill)	Best Country Song	Nominated
2009	"Sex & Gasoline"	Best Contemporary Folk/Americana Album	Nominated
2014	"Old Yellow Moon" (with Emmylou Harris)	Best Americana Album	Won
2016	"The Traveling Kind" (with Emmylou Harris)	Best Americana Album	Nominated
2016	"The Traveling Kind" (with Emmylou Harris and Cory Chisel)	Best American Roots Song	Nominated
2023	"I'll Love You Till the Day I Die" (with Chris Stapleton)	Best Country Song	Nominated

== Discography ==
Studio albums

- Ain't Living Long Like This (1978)
- But What Will the Neighbors Think (1980)
- Rodney Crowell (1981)
- Street Language (1986)
- Diamonds & Dirt (1988)
- Keys to the Highway (1989)
- Life Is Messy (1992)
- Let the Picture Paint Itself (1994)
- Jewel of the South (1995)
- The Houston Kid (2001)
- Fate's Right Hand (2003)
- The Outsider (2005)
- Sex & Gasoline (2008)
- Kin: Songs by Mary Karr & Rodney Crowell (2012)
- Old Yellow Moon (with Emmylou Harris, 2013)
- Tarpaper Sky (2014)
- The Traveling Kind (with Emmylou Harris, 2015)
- Close Ties (2017)
- Acoustic Classics (2018)
- Christmas Everywhere (2018)
- Texas (2019)
- Triage (2021)
- The Chicago Sessions (2023)
- Airline Highway (2025)
- Then Again (2026)

Awards
Preceded by Trent Reznor	AMA Song of the Year (Songwriter); 2004	Succeeded by Mark Heard
Preceded by Guy Clark	AMA Lifetime Achievement Award for Songwriting; 2006	Succeeded by Willie Nelson
