= Wide Open Live & More =

Wide Open Live & More!
- Directed by: Ivan Dudynsky
- Starring: Jason Aldean
- Distributed by: Eagle Rock
- Release date: August 25, 2009
- Running time: 86 minutes
- Language: English

Wide Open Live & More! is the first DVD release by American country music artist Jason Aldean. Filmed March 6, 2009, during Aldean's sold-out concert at Knoxville Coliseum, Knoxville, TN, and released August 25, 2009, the DVD additionally includes the music video for Aldean's then-recent #1 single, "Big Green Tractor".

== Set list ==
1. "Wide Open" (Jim Collins, Wendell Mobley, Neil Thrasher)
2. "I Break Everything I Touch" (David Lee Murphy, Kim Tribble)
3. "Amarillo Sky" (Big Kenny, John Rich, Rodney Clawson, Bart Pursley)
4. "Why" (Rich, Clawson, Vicky McGehee)
5. "Big Green Tractor" (Collins, Murphy)
6. "On My Highway" (Brett James, Kelly Archer, Justin Weaver)
7. "Johnny Cash" (Clawson, McGehee, Rich)
8. "Relentless" (James LeBlanc, John Paul White)
9. "You're the Love I Wanna Be In" (Jason Aldean, McGehee, Rich)
10. "Laughed Until We Cried" (Ashley Gorley, Kelley Lovelace)
11. "I Use What I Got" (Collins, James)
12. "She's Country" (Bridgette Tatum, Danny Myrick)
13. "Asphalt Cowboy" (Jeff Stevens, Kenny West)
14. "Hicktown" (Kenny, Rich, McGehee)

== Certifications ==
Region	Certification	Certified units/sales
United States (RIAA)	Platinum	100,000^{^}
^{^} Shipments figures based on certification alone.
