= The Truth (Jason Aldean song) =

Single by Jason Aldean

from the album Wide Open
- Released: September 28, 2009
- Recorded: 2008–09
- Genre: Country
- Length: 3:58
- Label: Broken Bow
- Songwriters: Brett James; Ashley Monroe
- Producer: Michael Knox

Jason Aldean singles chronology
"Big Green Tractor" (2009)	"The Truth" (2009)	"Crazy Town" (2010)

"The Truth" is a song written by Brett James and Ashley Monroe, and recorded by Trent Willmon for his 2008 album Broken In. The song was then covered by Jason Aldean on his album Wide Open. Aldean's version was released to radio on September 28, 2009, as the third single from the album, following the number one hits "She's Country" and "Big Green Tractor."

== Content ==
"The Truth" is a mid-tempo ballad in which a male looks at his failing relationship, asking his (ex)girlfriend not to tell others "the truth" about it. The final line reveals that the "truth" is that he still needs her.

The song was recorded by Trent Willmon on his 2008 album Broken In before Aldean recorded it for his third studio album, 2009's Wide Open. Regarding the song, Aldean told the website Country Standard Time, "This is one of those songs that I heard the first time and knew I wanted to cut[…]He's basically begging[…]saying 'make up whatever story you want, tell 'em I left town or whatever you need to say[…]just don't tell 'em the truth.' I don't know a guy who hasn't been through that before."

Ashley Monroe told Country Weekly magazine that she began writing the song with Brett James after having dinner at his house. She was "missing a boy" at the time, and used her former relationship as the inspiration for the song. She and James thought that it would be "more interesting to write about stuff that's not the truth, rather than the truth itself." James said that he enjoyed Aldean's recording because "he sounds just like the character I had in mind when I hear him sing it."

Jason Aldean has stated "The Truth" is his favorite song from the Wide Open album.

== Critical reception ==
The song has received generally positive reviews from music critics. Sam Gazdziak of Engine 145 gave it a thumbs-up, saying that the song "may be the most country-sounding song he’s ever released," also making note of Aldean's "understated vocal." Bobby Peacock of Roughstock gave the song a positive review, saying that its production was "dialed down" and more neotraditionalist in sound, compared to Aldean's more rock music-influenced songs such as "She's Country." He also viewed Aldean's vocal performance favorably.

== Music video ==
The music video, directed by Deaton-Flanigen Productions, premiered to CMT on November 10, 2009. The video pictures Aldean mailing a letter, then getting on a bus. He gets off at a motel (Drake Motel in downtown Nashville) and checks in, then goes out to sit by the pool as some people come outside to the pool, including some kids to swim, until it starts raining, and Aldean stays there and continues singing. Even though the video is supposed to have a summer-like setting, it was actually filmed on a cold day in October, according to Aldean on a segment on CMT's Top 20 Countdown with Lance Smith back in late 2009.

== Chart performance ==
On the week ending November 21, 2009, "The Truth" debuted at No. 91 on the Billboard Hot 100 and moved up the following week to #78. It has since reached a peak of #40. It became his fourth number one song on the U.S. Billboard Hot Country Songs chart week of February 6, 2010. at No. 86 on Canadian Hot 100 chart for the week of March 4, 2010.

Chart (2009–2010)	Peak position
Canada Country (Billboard)	1
Canada Hot 100 (Billboard)	79
US Billboard Hot 100	40
US Hot Country Songs (Billboard)	1

=== Year-end charts ===
Chart (2010)	Position
US Country Songs (Billboard)	32

== Certifications ==
Region	Certification	Certified units/sales
United States (RIAA)	Platinum	1,000,000^{‡}
^{‡} Sales+streaming figures based on certification alone.
