= Relentless =

Relentless may refer to:

== Film ==
- Relentless (1948 film), an American film directed by George Sherman
- Relentless, a 1977 American television film starring Will Sampson
- Relentless (1989 film), an American crime film starring Judd Nelson, followed by several sequels
- Relentless: The Struggle for Peace in the Middle East, a 2003 Israeli documentary film
- Relentless (2010 film), a Nigerian film starring Nneka Egbuna and Jimmy Jean-Louis

== Games ==
- Relentless Software, developers of the Buzz! series of quiz video games
- Relentless: Twinsen's Adventure or Little Big Adventure, a 1994 video game

== Literature ==
- Relentless (Mark Greaney novel), a 2021 novel in the Gray Man series by Mark Greaney
- Relentless (Kernick novel), a 2006 crime novel by Simon Kernick
- Relentless (Koontz novel), a 2009 thriller novel by Dean Koontz
- Relentless: The True Story of the Man Behind Rogers Communications, a 2008 autobiography by Ted Rogers
- The Lost Fleet: Relentless, a 2009 novel in the Lost Fleet series by John Campbell

== Music ==
=== Band ===
- The Relentless (band), a fictional metalcore band featured in the American Satan franchise

=== Albums ===
- Relentless (Bill Hicks album), a 1992 comedy album
- Relentless (For the Fallen Dreams album), 2009
- Relentless (Jackyl album), 2002
- Relentless (Jason Aldean album), or the title song (see below), 2007
- Relentless (Jo O'Meara album), 2005
- Relentless (Mortification album), 2003
- Relentless (Natalie Grant album), 2008
- Relentless (Pentagram album), 1985
- Relentless (The Pretenders album), 2023
- Relentless, a portion of the double album version of the 1993 release of the Pet Shop Boys album Very, 1993
- Relentless (Yngwie Malmsteen album), 2010
- Relentless, a 2009 album by Young MC
- Relentless EP, a 2007 EP by Malefice
- Relentless, gospel reggae album by Sherwin Gardner

=== Record labels ===
- Relentless Records, a Quebec record label

=== Songs ===
- "Relentless" (Jason Aldean song), 2008
- "Relentless" (Sick of It All song), 2003
- "Relentless", by Arkells from Rally Cry
- "Relentless", by Hillsong United
- "Relentless", by Hirax from Faster than Death
- "Relentless", by Little River Band from Playing to Win
- "Relentless", by Of Mice & Men from Cold World
- "Relentless", by Raven from Architect of Fear
- "Relentless", by The Stranglers from Suite XVI
- "Relentless", by Strapping Young Lad from Strapping Young Lad

== Ships ==
- HMS Relentless (H85), a WWII-era British destroyer
- USNS Relentless (T-AGOS-18), a 1989 U.S. Navy surveillance ship

== Other uses ==
- Relentless (drink), an energy drink manufactured by Coca-Cola
- Relentless Resources, former name of Australian mining company RZ Resources
- Relentless Suzuki, an alternative name for TAS Racing, an international road racing team from Northern Ireland
