= Banks of the Trinity =

Studio album by Cody Johnson
- Released: June 26, 2026
- Genre: Country
- Length: 52:09
- Labels: CoJo; Warner Nashville
- Producer: Trent Willmon

Cody Johnson chronology
Leather (2023)	Banks of the Trinity (2026)

Singles from Banks of the Trinity
- 1. "Horseback" Released: June 15, 2026

Banks of the Trinity is the tenth studio album by American country music singer Cody Johnson. It was released on June 26, 2026, through Johnson's own label, CoJo Music, and Warner Music Nashville. The album is produced by Johnson's longtime collaborator, Trent Willmon. "Horseback" was released on June 15, 2026, as the album's lead single.

== Background ==
Johnson announced Banks of the Trinity on April 16, 2026, alongside releasing "I Want You" as a promotional single. "Hello Lonesome" was released as the second promotional single on May 1, 2026.

Johnson described the album as a "reflection back to his roots back home in Sebastopol, Texas." The album also features collaborations with Luke Combs ("Shoot the Bull") and Brothers Osborne ("Fool Proof").

Johnson officially announced the album's track list on May 13, 2026, alongside the release of its third promotional single, "Fool Proof".

== Track listing ==
Banks of the Trinity track listing
No.	Title	Writer(s)	Length
1.	"Horseback"	Wyatt McCubbin; Randy Montana; Paul Sikes	2:49
2.	"Hello Lonesome"	Seth Mosley; Matt Rogers; Jimmy Yeary	2:59
3.	"Fool Proof" (with Brothers Osborne)	Jared Conrad; Jeff Hyde; Jason Scott	2:37
4.	"Take Me Back (Leave Me There)"	Kelly Archer; Troy Cartwright; Pete Good	2:59
5.	"Banks of the Trinity"	Rodney Clawson; Josh Kear; Chris Tompkins	2:59
6.	"I Want You"	Tom Douglas; Tony Lane; Rogers	3:11
7.	"I Have"	Devin Dawson; Matt Schuster; Adam Yaron	3:41
8.	"Bible for a Boy (For Jaycee)"	Beau Bailey; Joe Fox; Josh Phillips; Andrew Stoelzing; Lydia Vaughan	3:07
9.	"Kissing a Married Woman"	Bailey; Brock Berryhill; Cole Miracle; Phillips	3:27
10.	"Every Man"	Drew Kennedy; Travis Meadows; Gordie Sampson	3:19
11.	"Motel Miss You"	Ryan Larkins; Mosley; Emma-Lee	2:53
12.	"Shoot the Bull" (featuring Luke Combs)	Casey Brown; Ray Fulcher; Drew Parker; Phillips	3:05
13.	"Cricket on a Hook"	Mark Holman; Phillips; Jeremy Stover	3:24
14.	"Time Bomb"	Cody Johnson; Codrick Murphy; Noe Quantanilla; Trent Willmon	4:05
15.	"Thank Somebody Country"	Trannie Anderson; Michael Hardy; Chase McGill; Jordan Schmidt	3:46
16.	"Yippy Ty Oh Hey Hey"	Johnson	3:48
Total length:			52:09

== Personnel ==
Credits are adapted from Tidal.

- Cody Johnson – vocals (all tracks), acoustic guitar (track 16)
- Trent Willmon – production (all tracks), background vocals (1, 5, 13)
- James Mitchell – electric guitar (1–15)
- Justin Ostrander – electric guitar (1–15)
- Jim "Moose" Brown – keyboards (1–15)
- Scotty Sanders – pedal steel guitar (1–15)
- Jenee Fleenor – fiddle (1–3, 5–10, 13)
- Tim Galloway – acoustic guitar (1–3, 5, 6, 8–12)
- Jimmie Lee Sloas – bass (1–3, 5, 6, 8–12)
- Jerry Roe – drums (1–3, 5, 6, 8–12)
- Trey Keller – background vocals (2, 3, 5–9, 11–13)
- John Osborne – electric guitar (3)
- Joel Key – acoustic guitar (4, 7, 13–15)
- Mike Brignardello – bass (4, 7, 13–15)
- Evan Hutchings – drums (4, 7, 13–15)
- Shelly Fairchild – background vocals (4)
- Holly Tucker – background vocals (6, 10)
- Luke Combs – vocals (12)
- Mickey Raphael – harmonica (14)
- Jack Clarke – recording, mixing
- Evan Ridgway – recording assistance
- Will Kienzle – recording assistance
- Andrew Mendelson – mastering
- Chris Small – digital editing
- Rose Hutcheson – production management
- Scott Johnson – production management

== Charts ==
Chart performance for Banks of the Trinity
Chart (2026)	Peak position
Canadian Albums (Billboard)	98
UK Album Downloads (Official Charts)	24
US Billboard 200	28
US Top Country Albums (Billboard)	8
