= Horseback (song) =

2026 single by Cody Johnson

Single by Cody Johnson

from the album Banks of the Trinity
- Released: June 15, 2026
- Genre: Country
- Length: 2:48
- Label: Warner Music Nashville
- Songwriters: Paul Sikes; Randy Montana; Wyatt McCubbin
- Producer: Trent Willmon

Cody Johnson singles chronology
"The Fall" (2026)	"Horseback" (2026)

"Horseback" is a song by American country music singer Cody Johnson. It was released on June 15, 2026 as the lead single from his tenth studio album Banks of the Trinity. The song was written by Paul Sikes, Randy Montana and Wyatt McCubbin and produced by Trent Willmon.

== Background and composition ==
Musically, the song draws on "Texas Western dancehall" elements. The lyrics include wordplay and tell the story of a ranch hand who is left broke after his ex-wife takes most of his money and possessions in their divorce. However, he only wants to get his horse back, which she never liked and took simply to spite him. One night, he successfully retrieves his horse from her.

Cody Johnson selected the song to be the lead single for Banks of the Trinity for its humorous nature, a departure from the serious tone of his last single, "The Fall".

== Critical reception ==
Writing for Holler, Maxim Mower described the instrumental as "wonderfully twangy" and commented it gives an "extra jolt of energy and levity" to Johnson's commanding vocals. Quinn Eaton of Whiskey Riff remarked that Johnson "does a beautiful job of bringing the comical lyrics to life".

== Live performances ==
On June 24, 2026, Cody Johnson performed the song on The Tonight Show Starring Jimmy Fallon.

== Charts ==
Chart performance for "Horseback"
Chart (2026)	Peak position
Canada Country (Billboard)	23
US Bubbling Under Hot 100 (Billboard)	12
US Country Airplay (Billboard)	17
US Hot Country Songs (Billboard)	38
