= Broken In =

Studio album by Trent Willmon
- Released: February 26, 2008
- Genre: Country
- Length: 47:55
- Label: Compadre
- Producer: Rodney Clawson; Daniel Frizsell; Trent Willmon

Trent Willmon chronology
A Little More Livin' (2006)	Broken In (2008)	Little Ol' Cafe (2010)

Singles from Broken In
- 1. "There Is a God" Released: September 17, 2007; 2. "Broken In" Released: January 28, 2008; 3. "Cold Beer and a Fishin' Pole" Released: August 4, 2008

Broken In is the third album by American country music singer Trent Willmon. It was released in February 2008 on the independent Compadre Records label. None of its singles—the title track, "There Is a God" or "Cold Beer and a Fishing Pole"—entered the Hot Country Songs chart. The track "It Doesn't Mean I Don't Love You" was previously recorded by the duo McHayes, whose version from their unreleased 2003 album Lessons in Lonely was a number 41-peaking country single in 2003.

Two of the album's songs were later recorded by other artists. Jason Aldean released "The Truth" as a single from his 2009 album Wide Open. Lee Ann Womack released "There Is a God" in November 2009, though it was not subsequently featured on an album.

== Track listing ==
1. "Broken In" (Rhett Akins, Ben Hayslip, Gary Loyd) – 3:38
2. "Dry County" (Rodney Clawson, Trent Willmon) – 3:12
3. "It Doesn't Mean I Don't Love You" (Bobby Pinson, Jeremy Spillman, Willmon) – 3:08
4. "Cold Beer and a Fishin' Pole" (Casey Beathard, Phil O'Donnell) – 4:00
5. "The Way I Remember It" (Clawson) – 4:01
6. "The Good Ol' Days Are Gone" (Brandon Kinney, Willmon) – 3:01
7. "How a Cowboy Lives" (Pinson, Spillman, Willmon) – 5:02
8. "The Truth" (Brett James, Ashley Monroe) – 3:47
9. "Little Set of Horns" (Spillman, Willmon) – 3:13
10. "Tumbleweed Town" (Kinney, Willmon) – 4:40
11. "I'll Love You Anyway" (Willmon) – 3:32
12. "There Is a God" (Chris DuBois, Ashley Gorley) – 6:41
13. "There Is a God" (multimedia track)

== Chart performance ==
Chart performance for Broken In
Chart (2008)	Peak position
US Top Country Albums (Billboard)	33
US Heatseekers Albums (Billboard)	7
US Independent Albums (Billboard)	30
