= There's More Where That Came From =

Studio album by Lee Ann Womack
- Released: February 8, 2005
- Studio: Blackbird Studio, Essential Sound, House Of Gain, Ocean Way Nashville and Back Stage Studios (Nashville, Tennessee); Sound Kitchen (Franklin, Tennessee)
- Genre: Neotraditional country
- Length: 51:19
- Label: MCA Nashville
- Producer: Greg Droman; Byron Gallimore

Lee Ann Womack chronology
Greatest Hits (2004)	There's More Where That Came From (2005)	Call Me Crazy (2008)

Singles from There's More Where That Came From
- 1. "I May Hate Myself in the Morning" Released: October 25, 2004; 2. "He Oughta Know That by Now" Released: April 11, 2005; 3. "Twenty Years and Two Husbands Ago" Released: November 14, 2005

There's More Where That Came From is the sixth studio album by American country music artist Lee Ann Womack, released on February 8, 2005, via MCA Nashville; it was initially her last album with the label before moving to Mercury Records, in which she recorded one single before returning back to MCA Nashville. It was her first studio album since Something Worth Leaving Behind (2002), which was much less successful both critically and commercially compared to her previous efforts. It was a return to the neotraditional country sound of her first two albums, from her last album's more pop-infused sound. The album had a more 70's aesthetic and sound in the vain to older contemporaries such as Dolly Parton and Barbara Mandrell.

The album was critically acclaimed by music critics, some even calling it Womack's best studio album. It was her highest-selling effort since I Hope You Dance (2000), debuting at number 3 on the Top Country Albums chart with first week sales of 83,000 copies. It has been certified Gold for sales of 500,000 copies in the United States alone.

Three official singles were released. "I May Hate Myself in the Morning" was released on October 25, 2004. It peaked at number ten on the US Hot Country Songs chart, becoming Womack's first top ten hit since 2001's "Ashes by Now" and also won the CMA Award for Single of the Year at the 2005 CMA Awards. "He Oughta Know That by Now" and "Twenty Years and Two Husbands Ago" were released as the second and third singles, with the former peaking at number 22 and the latter at number 32. The album received the CMA Award for Album of the Year in 2005, making Womack the first solo female artist to win since 1995 when Patty Loveless won with When Fallen Angels Fly (1994). It was also nominated at the ACM Awards in 2006 for their Album of the Year.

== Background ==
Womack told The Dallas Morning News that MCA Nashville inspired her to record another album and said "I was sitting at home after Something Worth Leaving Behind thinking, 'Gosh, I thought this is what people wanted. And they didn't want it so obviously I don't know.' And they were the ones who came to me and said, 'When are you going to give us a record?' That's when I started thinking, 'Well, if they want a record, I'll make 'em one.'" She also said, "When I started making this record, I said I'm gonna have fun, and that's it. I'm not going to worry about does this sound right coming from a woman, or is this too country, or is this intro too long? I wanted this record to sound like where I came from."

Womack told Billboard, "I thought so much, harder than I've ever worked before on a record on 'Something Worth Leaving Behind,' and it just didn't work. I promised myself with this record I wouldn't think at all. I would just totally follow my heart and not my head." Womack told The Mirror, "These are songs that aren't afraid to tell the truth. It is definitely honest music as far as the lyrics go. They're a slice of life – the good, bad and the ugly."

== Critical reception ==
Professional ratings
Review scores
Source	Rating
AllMusic	4.5/5 stars
Rolling Stone	3/5 stars
PopMatters	(favorable)
Country Standard Time	(favorable)

Rhapsody ranked the album #6 on its "Country’s Best Albums of the Decade" list. "Lee Ann Womack's There's More... is an album steeped in an old-school country tradition: tales of dead-end relationships, cheating and broken hearts abound. The traditional-sounding arrangements – featuring steel guitar, piano, harmonica and fiddle, – help color a page from a bygone era, leaning heavily on the sepia-toned '70s for a classic, "old country" sound. Case in point: the stunning "I May Hate Myself in the Morning" sounds like a long-lost country gem from the 1970s and is one of the CD's many highlights. This release is a classic in every sense of the word." CMT ranked it on its "A Dozen Favorite Country Albums of the Decade" list. Engine 145 country music blog list it #2 on the "Top Country Albums of the Decade" list.

Kelefa Sanneh of the New York Times gave the album a positive review and wrote, "There's no denying that There's More Where That Came From works: it's a strikingly handsome album, with tunes so sweet you might almost miss the unexpectedly bleak lyrics. Packaging and marketing aside, this album isn't really so different from the albums Ms. Womack has been making all along; it's just that she's found an uncommonly good set of songs to sing, and a first-rate group of musicians to play them as gently – and as beautifully – as she sings them." Saneh also listed the album as the tenth best of 2005.

Editors at Billboard wrote, "Hallelujah. One of country music's great singers is singing country again – bona fide lovin', cryin' and cheatin' songs. Womack evokes George Jones on the killer "One's a Couple" and tender, world-weary "Twenty Years and Two Husbands Ago." Consider this an early contender for best country album of the year. Editors at The Detroit Free Press gave the album four stars and wrote, "Womack has rooted around in country's earthy past and rediscovered a simple truth: Sin can be a mighty sweet topic, especially when it's approached honestly and accompanied by a fiddle and steel guitar. All we can hope now is that her album title is prophetic. If Womack has more where this came from, we can't wait to hear it." Shane Harrison of The Atlanta Journal gave the album a B+ rating and wrote, "Nothing else is quite as old-school as that opener, but Womack's voice makes sure it's all as country as can be, even if a few of the songs lean a little toward pop. Splitting the difference between Dolly Parton and Wynette, Womack sounds like the good girl plagued by naughty thoughts. She's easily the best truly country female singer mainstream Nashville can claim these days." Joey Guerra of the Houston Chronicle gave the album a positive review and wrote, "Womack's polished approach to the material doesn't match Wright's warts-and-all honesty, but both women are thankfully – and often thrillingly – back to making country music their own way." Sarah Rodman of the Boston Herald gave the album a positive review and wrote, There's More Where That Came From" finds Womack blending contemporary country hooks with a down-home approach to arranging the fiddles, banjos, strings and pedal steel guitars. The easygoing arrangements help Womack purposefully evoke the laid-back, yet sometimes raw sound of such heroes as Loretta Lynn and Tammy Wynette. In between the weepers, Womack kicks up her heels a bit. But even in her bluest blues, you can hear a singer enjoying herself wholeheartedly

Nick Marino of Entertainment Weekly gave the album a B+ rating and wrote, "It's a patient album, content to float the singer's soprano over pretty melodies that billow like curtains in the breeze. The music serves the lyrics, which dwell on loving, leaving, and aging. More isn't especially cute, nor is it fancy. But it feels the way old country feels." Entertainment Weekly also listed the album as the eight best of 2005. Ralph Novak of People Magazine gave the album three stars in his review and praised "Twenty Years and Two Husbands Ago". Josh Tyrangiel of Time Magazine gave the album a favorable review and praised "Waiting for the Sun to Shine" and said it provides "a much needed reminder that country, more than any other musical genre, still has the potential to offer instant intimacy.

=== Accolades ===
Awards
Association	Year	Category	Result
CMA Awards	2005	Album of the Year	Won
CMA Awards	2005	Single of the Year (for "I May Hate Myself in the Morning")	Won
CMA Awards	2005	Music Video of the Year (for "I May Hate Myself in the Morning")	Nominated
ACM Awards	2005	Album of the Year	Nominated
ACM Awards	2005	Single Record of the Year (for "I May Hate Myself in the Morning")	Nominated
ACM Awards	2005	Music Video of the Year (for "I May Hate Myself in the Morning")	Nominated

== Track listing ==
All tracks produced by Byron Gallimore except "When You Get to Me", produced by Greg Droman

No.	Title	Writer(s)	Length
1.	"There's More Where That Came From"	Chris Stapleton; Chris DuBois	3:53
2.	"One's a Couple"	Billy Lawson; Dale Dodson; John Northrup	4:10
3.	"I May Hate Myself in the Morning"	Odie Blackmon	4:34
4.	"The Last Time"	David Lee; Tony Lane; DuBois	4:23
5.	"He Oughta Know That by Now"	Clint Ingersoll; Jeremy Spillman	3:43
6.	"Twenty Years and Two Husbands Ago"	Lee Ann Womack; Dean Dillon; Dodson	3:49
7.	"Happiness"	Kostas	4:10
8.	"When You Get to Me"	Bill Luther; Marv Green	4:04
9.	"Painless"	Luther; Hillary Lindsey; Luke Laird	4:34
10.	"What I Miss About Heaven"	Marcus Hummon; Annie Roboff	2:55
11.	"Waiting for the Sun to Shine"	Sonny Throckmorton	4:31
12.	"Stubborn (Psalm 151)"	Don Schlitz; Brett James	4:05
13.	"Just Someone I Used to Know" (hidden track)	Jack Clement	2:28
Total length:			51:19

== Production ==
- Byron Gallimore – producer (1–7, 9–12)
- Greg Droman – producer (8)
- Ann Callis – production coordinator (1–7, 9–12)
- Mike "Frog" Griffith – production coordinator (8)
- Craig Allen – art direction, design
- Timothy Priano – artist
- James Minchin III – photography
- Keith Carpenter – hair
- Mally Roncal – make-up
- Seble Mazza – wardrobe
- Erv Woolsey – management
- Cathy Robinson – management

Technical credits

- Hank Williams – mastering at MasterMix (Nashville, Tennessee)
- Julian King – recording (1–7, 9–12)
- Byron Gallimore – mixing (1, 9, 10)
- Chuck Ainlay – mixing (2, 4)
- Greg Droman – mixing (3, 5–8, 11, 12), recording (8)
- David Bryant – recording assistant, mix assistant (8)
- Todd Gunnerson – recording assistant (8), mix assistant (8)
- Julie Brakey – additional recording (1–7, 9–12)
- Jesse Chrisman – additional recording (1–7, 9–12)
- Jason Gantt – additional recording (1–7, 9–12)
- Sara Lesher – additional recording (1–7, 9–12)
- Erik Lutkins – additional recording (1–7, 9–12)

== Personnel ==
- Lee Ann Womack – vocals, backing vocals (2, 3, 6, 11)
- Jimmy Nichols – acoustic piano (1, 2), organ (9)
- Steve Nathan – Wurlitzer electric piano (3), acoustic piano (4, 6, 7, 12), organ (7), keyboards (8), synthesizers (10)
- Bryan Gallimore – organ (10)
- Tom Bukovac – electric guitar (1, 6–10)
- Randy Scruggs – acoustic guitar (1, 5–7, 9–11), acoustic 12-string guitar (11)
- B. James Lowry – acoustic guitar (2–4, 12)
- Brent Mason – electric guitar (2–4, 12), gut-string guitar (12)
- David Grissom – electric guitar (5, 11)
- Bryan Sutton – acoustic guitar (5, 8, 10), acoustic 12-string guitar (8), banjo (10)
- Mark Casstevens – acoustic guitar (6), banjo (10)
- Troy Lancaster – electric guitar (8)
- Rusty Danmyer – steel guitar (1, 6, 7, 9), dobro (10)
- Paul Franklin – steel guitar (2–4, 11, 12), dobro (11)
- Robby Turner – steel guitar (8)
- Stuart Duncan – mandolin (4)
- Glenn Worf – bass (1–7)
- Michael Rhodes – bass (8–12)
- Shannon Forrest – drums (1–11), percussion (3, 4)
- Lonnie Wilson – drums (12), percussion (12)
- Eric Darken – percussion (8)
- Aubrey Haynie – fiddle (1, 5–8, 10), mandolin (5, 9)
- Larry Franklin – fiddle (2–5, 12), mandolin (5, 11)
- Kirk "Jelly Roll" Johnson – harmonica (4)
- The Nashville String Machine – strings (6)
- Bergen White – string arrangements (6)
- David Campbell – string arrangements (12)
- Carl Gorodetzky – string contractor (6)
- Wes Hightower – backing vocals (1, 4–7, 10)
- Chris Stapleton – backing vocals (1)
- Jason Sellers – backing vocals (2, 3, 11)
- Andrea Zonn – backing vocals (4)
- Bill Luther – backing vocals (8)
- Harry Stinson – backing vocals (8)
- Luke Laird – backing vocals (9)
- Lisa Cochran – backing vocals (12)
- Chris Rodriguez – backing vocals (12)

== Charts ==
The album reached number 3 on Billboard's Top Country Albums charts and number 12 on the Billboard 200, giving Womack her third consecutive Top 20 on that chart. The album sold 83,000 during its first week. The album was certified gold by the RIAA for shipments of over 500,000 units.

=== Weekly charts ===
Chart (2005)	Peak position
US Billboard 200	12
US Top Country Albums (Billboard)	3

=== Year-end charts ===
Chart (2005)	Position
US Top Country Albums (Billboard)	32

== Certifications ==
Region	Certification	Certified units/sales
United States (RIAA)	Gold	500,000^{^}
^{^} Shipments figures based on certification alone.
