= Wide Open (Jason Aldean album) =

Studio album by Jason Aldean
- Released: April 7, 2009
- Recorded: 2008–09
- Studios: Treasure Isle Studios (Nashville, Tennessee)
- Genres: Country; country rock
- Length: 41:53
- Label: Broken Bow
- Producer: Michael Knox

Jason Aldean chronology
Relentless (2007)	Wide Open (2009)	My Kinda Party (2010)

Singles from Wide Open
- 1. "She's Country" Released: December 1, 2008; 2. "Big Green Tractor" Released: May 26, 2009; 3. "The Truth" Released: September 28, 2009; 4. "Crazy Town" Released: March 1, 2010

Professional ratings
Review scores
Source	Rating
Allmusic	3/5 stars
Entertainment Weekly	B
MSN Music (Consumer Guide)	(dud)

Wide Open is the third studio album by American country music artist Jason Aldean, released on April 7, 2009, by Broken Bow Records.

The album produced four singles; three of which have topped the Billboard country singles chart. "She's Country", the lead-off single, became his second number-one hit on the chart in May 2009, and his first number one since "Why" in May 2006. It was followed by the releases of "Big Green Tractor" and "The Truth", which also topped the chart in September 2009 and February 2010, respectively. "Crazy Town" is the fourth single from the album, which peaked at number 2.

== Background ==
As with his first two albums, Wide Open was produced by Michael Knox.

The first single from Wide Open is "She's Country", which was co-written by former Western Flyer member Danny Myrick. This song reached number one on the U.S. country singles charts in May 2009, becoming Aldean's second number one and his first since "Why" in May 2006. "Big Green Tractor" is the next single, released in May 2009 became Aldean's third number one in August 2009. "This I Gotta See" was previously recorded by Andy Griggs on his 2004 album of the same name. Griggs' version of the song reached number 58 on the country charts in mid-2005. Additionally, Trent Willmon previously recorded "The Truth" on his 2008 album Broken In.

== Commercial performance ==
This album debuted at number 2 on the US Top Country Albums chart, and number 4 on Billboard 200, selling 109,000 copies in the United States in its first week.

The album has sold 1.4 million copies in the United States as of April 2011. The album was certified double Platinum by the RIAA on January 31, 2017 for two million units consumed.

== Track listing ==
No.	Title	Writer(s)	Length
1.	"Wide Open"	Albert Jackson; Wendell Mobley; Neil Thrasher	4:00
2.	"This I Gotta See"	Tony Martin; Thrasher	3:57
3.	"Fast"	Michael Dulaney; Tom Shapiro; Thrasher	4:14
4.	"Crazy Town"	Rodney Clawson; Brett Jones	3:03
5.	"Don't Give Up on Me"	Brett James; Troy Verges	3:40
6.	"She's Country"	Bridgette Tatum; Danny Myrick	3:38
7.	"On My Highway"	James; Kelly Archer; Justin Weaver	3:47
8.	"Keep the Girl"	Jason Aldean; Mobley; Thrasher	4:30
9.	"Big Green Tractor"	Jim Collins; David Lee Murphy	3:24
10.	"The Truth"	James; Ashley Monroe	3:58
11.	"Love Was Easy"	David Frasier; Weaver	3:34
12.	"The Best of Me" (bonus track)	Brantley Gilbert	4:24
Total length:			41:53

== Personnel ==
Musicians

- Jason Aldean – vocals
- Tony Harrell – acoustic piano, Wurlitzer electric piano, Hammond B3 organ
- Mike Rojas – acoustic piano, Hammond B3 organ
- Kurt Allison – electric guitars
- Billy Panda – acoustic guitars
- Adam Shoenfeld – electric guitars
- Michael "Mike Dee" Johnson – steel guitar
- Tully Kennedy – bass guitar
- Rich Redmond – drums, percussion
- Wes Hightower – backing vocals
- Rodney Clawson – backing vocals (4)
- Liana Manis – backing vocals (5)
- Neil Thrasher – backing vocals (6, 8)

Production

- Michael Knox – producer
- Peter Coleman – recording, mixing
- Brandon Epps – assistant engineer, editing
- Sam Martin – assistant engineer
- Richard Dodd – mastering
- Neena Wright – production assistant
- Shalacy Griffin – project assistant
- Luellyn Latocki – art direction
- Jeff Crump – graphic design
- Kristin Barlowe – photography
- Spalding Entertainment – management

== Charts and certifications ==
=== Weekly charts ===
Chart (2009)	Peak position
US Billboard 200	4
US Top Country Albums (Billboard)	2
US Independent Albums (Billboard)	1

=== Certifications ===
Region	Certification	Certified units/sales
United States (RIAA)	2× Platinum	2,000,000 / 1,400,000

=== Year-end charts ===
Chart (2009)	Position
US Billboard 200	36
US Top Country Albums (Billboard)	8
Chart (2010)	Position
US Billboard 200	41
US Top Country Albums (Billboard)	8

=== Singles ===
Year	Single	Peak chart positions		
Year	Single	US Country	US	CAN
2008	"She's Country"	1	29	90
2009	"Big Green Tractor"	1	18	54
2009	"The Truth"	1	40	79
2010	"Crazy Town"	2	51	85
