= 2005 Country Music Association Awards =

Music awards ceremony in New York

- Date: November 15, 2005
- Location: Madison Square Garden, New York City, New York, U.S.
- Hosted by: Brooks & Dunn

Highlights
- Most wins: Lee Ann Womack (3)
- Most nominations: Brad Paisley; Lee Ann Womack (7 each)

Television/radio coverage
- Network: CBS

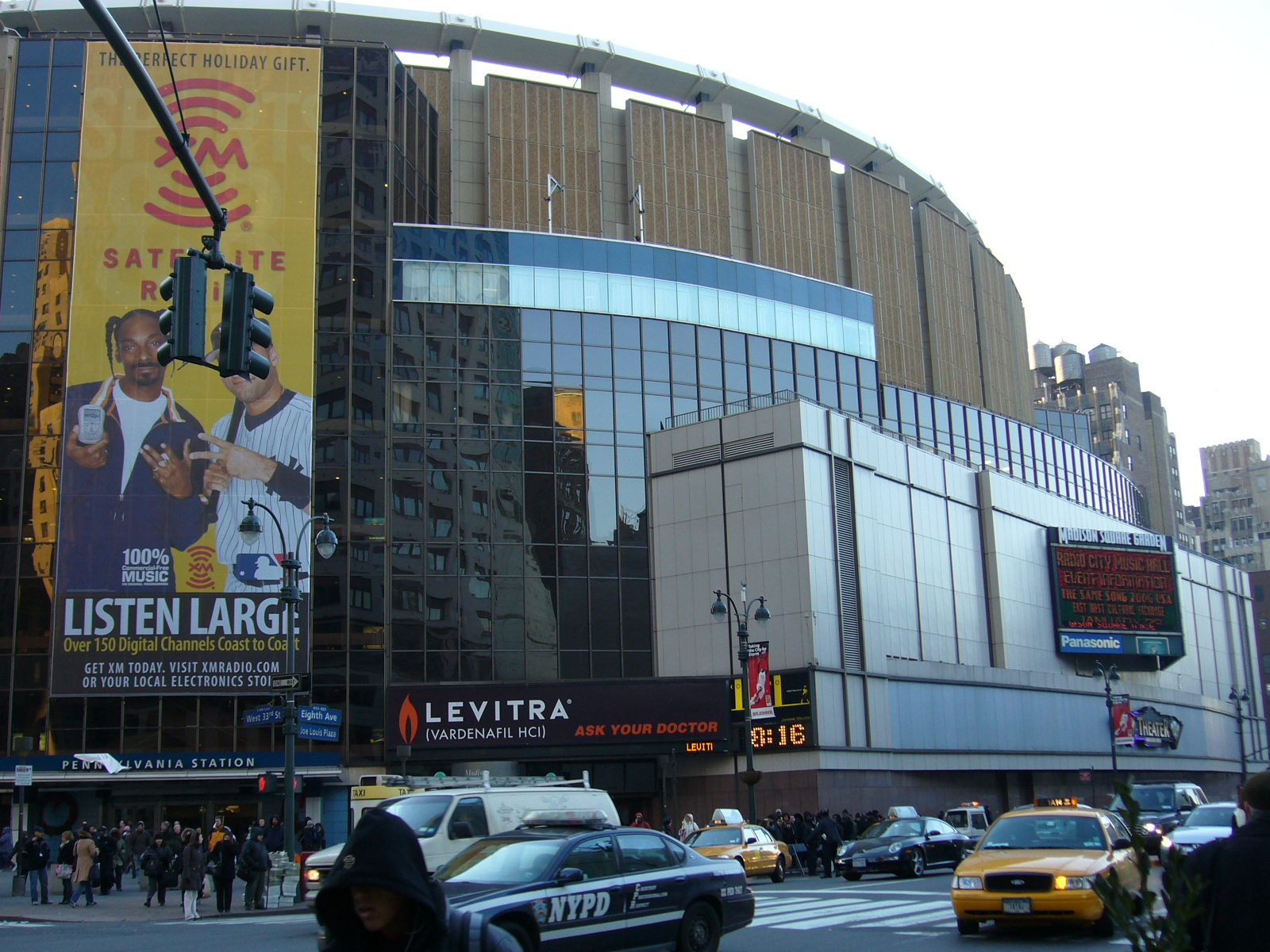
Madison Square Garden in New York City, New York

The 39th Country Music Association Award took place on November 15, 2005 and was hosted by Brooks & Dunn. It was the first ceremony to be held at Madison Square Garden in New York City, New York. After 34 years, dating back to 1972, this was the final ceremony to air on CBS before the switch to ABC.

== Winners and nominees ==
Bold denotes the winners

Entertainer of the Year	Album of the Year
**Keith Urban**; Kenny Chesney; Alan Jackson; Toby Keith; Brad Paisley	**There's More Where That Came From — Lee Ann Womack**; Be Here — Keith Urban; Feels Like Today — Rascal Flatts; Live Like You Were Dying — Tim McGraw; Somewhere Down in Texas — George Strait
Male Vocalist of the Year	Female Vocalist of the Year
**Keith Urban**; Kenny Chesney; Alan Jackson; Brad Paisley; George Strait	**Gretchen Wilson**; Sara Evans; Alison Krauss; Martina McBride; Lee Ann Womack
Vocal Group of the Year	Vocal Duo of the Year
**Rascal Flatts**; Alison Krauss & Union Station; Diamond Rio; Lonestar; Sugarland	**Brooks & Dunn**; Big & Rich; Montgomery Gentry; Van Zant; The Warren Brothers
Single of the Year	Song of the Year
**"I May Hate Myself in the Morning" — Lee Ann Womack**; ""Alcohol" — Brad Paisley; "As Good as I Once Was" — Toby Keith; "Baby Girl" — Sugarland; "Bless the Broken Road" — Rascal Flatts	**"Whiskey Lullaby" — Bill Anderson and Jon Randall**; "Alcohol" — Brad Paisley; "As Good as I Once Was" — Toby Keith and Scotty Emerick; "Bless the Broken Road" — Marcus Hummon, Bobby Boyd and Jeff Hanna; "I May Hate Myself in the Morning" — Odie Blackmon; "Redneck Woman" — Gretchen Wilson and John Rich
Horizon Award	Musician of the Year
**Dierks Bentley**; Big & Rich; Miranda Lambert; Julie Roberts; Sugarland	**Jerry Douglas, Dobro**; Paul Franklin, Steel guitar; Dann Huff, Electric guitar; Brent Mason, Guitar/Electric Guitar; Randy Scruggs, Guitar/Mandolin
Music Video of the Year	Musical Event of the Year
**"As Good as I Once Was" — Toby Keith**; "Alcohol" — Brad Paisley; "Days Go By" — Keith Urban; "I May Hate Myself in the Morning" — Lee Ann Womack; "When I Think About Cheatin'" — Gretchen Wilson	**"Good News, Bad News" — George Strait with Lee Ann Womack**; "I'll Never Be Free" — Willie Nelson with Lee Ann Womack; "New Again" — Brad Paisley with Sara Evans; "Party for Two" — Shania Twain with Billy Currington; "Trip Around the Sun" — Jimmy Buffett with Martina McBride

== Performances ==
Artist(s)	Song(s)
Kenny Chesney	"Living in Fast Forward"
Big & Rich	"Comin' to Your City"
Sara Evans	"Cheatin'"
Brad Paisley	"When I Get Where I'm Going"
Rascal Flatts	"Fast Cars and Freedom"
Willie Nelson; Paul Simon; Norah Jones	Presenting Song of the Year "Still Crazy After All These Years" "Crazy"
Lee Ann Womack	"Twenty Years and Two Husbands Ago"
George Strait	"High Tone Woman"
Garth Brooks	Live in Time Square "Good Ride Cowboy"
Martina McBride	"Help Me Make It Through the Night"
Alan Jackson	"Wonderful Tonight"
Sugarland	"Something More"
Bon Jovi; Jennifer Nettles	"Who Says You Can't Go Home"
Tim McGraw; Faith Hill	"Like We Never Loved at All"
Miranda Lambert	"Kerosene"
Keith Urban	"Better Life"
Gretchen Wilson	"I Don't Feel Like Loving You Today"
Alison Krauss & Union Station	"My Poor Heart"
Dierks Bentley	"Come a Little Closer"
Julie Roberts	"First to Never Know"
Carrie Underwood	"Jesus, Take the Wheel"
Brooks & Dunn	"Believe"
Dolly Parton; Elton John	"Turn the Lights Out When You Leave" "Imagine"
