= I Want You (Cody Johnson song) =

2026 song by Cody Johnson

Promotional single by Cody Johnson

from the album Banks of the Trinity
- Released: April 17, 2026
- Genre: Country
- Length: 3:10
- Label: Warner Music Nashville
- Songwriters: Matt Rogers; Thomas Douglas; Tony Lane
- Producer: Trent Willmon

"I Want You" is a song by American country music singer Cody Johnson, released on April 17, 2026, as a promotional single from his upcoming tenth studio album Banks of the Trinity. It was written by Matt Rogers, Tom Douglas and Tony Lane and produced by Trent Willmon.

== Composition ==
The song is composed of a "meandering, laid-back" guitar-driven instrumental, with faint steel guitar in the background. Lyrically, Cody Johnson declares his unconditional love and devotion to his wife Brandi, singing that he always wants to be with her regardless of the situation. He begins by listing a series of juxtaposing moments, such as her being well-dressed for a date or feeling vulnerable and in need of support. Johnson further emphasizes that his love for her surpasses his other desires, dismissing the idea of riding a rocket ship to space as trivial compared to singing a song to her.

== Critical reception ==
Jessica Nicholson of Billboard commented "Johnson is known for dynamic melodies that make the most of his powerful voice, but this song's strength is in its measured vulnerability."

== Charts ==
Chart performance for "I Want You"
Chart (2026)	Peak position
New Zealand Hot Singles (RMNZ)	27
US Billboard Hot 100	79
US Hot Country Songs (Billboard)	27
