= The Way I'm Livin' (song) =

Single by Lee Ann Womack

from the album The Way I'm Livin'
- Released: May 22, 2014
- Genre: Country
- Length: 3:44
- Label: Caroline; Sugar Hill
- Songwriter: Adam Wright
- Producers: Chuck Ainlay; Frank Liddell; Glenn Worf

Lee Ann Womack singles chronology
"There Is a God" (2009)	"The Way I'm Livin'" (2014)	"Send It on Down" (2015)

"The Way I'm Livin'" is a song written by Adam Wright and originally recorded by The Wrights as "The Way That I'm Living" for their 2010 album Red and Yellow, Blue and Green. It was later recorded by American country music artist Lee Ann Womack. It was issued as the lead single to her studio album, also titled The Way I'm Livin', in May 2014 via Sugar Hill Records and Caroline Records. Despite having little commercial success, the song received positive reviews from critics.

== Background and content ==
In 2012, Lee Ann Womack parted ways with her long-time record label, MCA Records Nashville. She then signed with the independent label, Sugar Hill Records. At the new label, she cut the title track to her upcoming studio album. "The Way I'm Livin'" was composed by Adam Wright, a Grammy-nominated songwriter, who previously wrote Alan Jackson's "So You Don't Have to Love Me Anymore."

In an interview with the Wall Street Journal, Womack recalled hearing the song for the first time and her initial reaction: "Real roots music, whether it's country or bluegrass, the blues, even rock, is about hitting a nerve. You can't not react. It's not an easy thing to do, but man, this song hit me the first time I heard it, and it hits me every time I sing it, hear it or even think about it." "The Way I'm Livin'" was recorded in sessions held in four different studios, three of which were located in Nashville, Tennessee. The sessions were produced by Chuck Ainlay, Frank Liddell and Glenn Worf.

== Critical reception ==
"The Way I'm Livin'" received positive reviews from critics following its release. Sounds Like Nashville called the song a "scalding psychic meltdown of a lost soul, banging on the rocks and not sure they want any better." Writers also compared its musical sound to that of her previous single, "Does My Ring Burn Your Finger." Chuck Dauphin of Billboard magazine praised Womack's voice on the song, commenting, "At the end of the day, you realize that nobody sings about the dark end of the street better than Womack." Jonathan Keefe of Country Universe praised the song's writing and Womack's vocal delivery.

== Release and music video ==
"The Way I'm Livin'" was released as a single via Caroline Records and Sugar Hill Records. It debuted on May 22, 2014. On the song debuted on the website of the Wall Street Journal on May 22, 2014. "The Way I'm Livin'" did reach any charting positions on a Billboard list. It was Womack's first single release in her career to miss any Billboard chart publication. On September 23, 2014, Womack's album of the same name was released. The song was included as the third track on the album. A music video was released for the song several months later that was directed by Roger Pistole.

== Track listing ==
Digital single release

- "The Way I'm Livin'" – 3:44
