= Dixie Rose Deluxe's Honky-Tonk, Feed Store, Gun Shop, Used Car, Beer, Bait, BBQ, Barber Shop, Laundromat =

Single by Trent Willmon

from the album Trent Willmon
- Released: August 7. 2004
- Genre: Country
- Length: 3:53
- Label: Columbia
- Songwriters: Trent Willmon, Michael P. Heeney
- Producer: Frank Rogers

Trent Willmon singles chronology
"Beer Man" (2004)	"Dixie Rose Deluxe's Honky-Tonk, Feed Store, Gun Shop, Used Car, Beer, Bait, BBQ, Barber Shop, Laundromat" (2004)	"Home Sweet Holiday Inn" (2004)

"Dixie Rose Deluxe's Honky-Tonk, Feed Store, Gun Shop, Used Car, Beer, Bait, BBQ, Barber Shop, Laundromat" is a song co-written and recorded by American country music artist Trent Willmon. It was released in August 2004 as the second single from the album Trent Willmon. The song reached #36 on the Billboard Hot Country Singles & Tracks chart. The song was written by Willmon and Michael P. Heeney.

== Content ==
The song is an up-tempo about a man who expresses desire for a woman named Becky Jo who works at the song's eponymous store.

== Critical reception ==
Deborah Evans Price of Billboard reviewed the song favorably, saying that "the clever lyric serves up a picturesque look at an all-purpose rural retail outlet and the pretty employee that keeps a lovesick Romeo frequenting the establishment. The vocal is full of energy, and Rogers' production is taut".

== Chart performance ==
Due to the length of the song's title, it was listed as just "Dixie Rose Deluxe's" on the charts.

Chart (2004)	Peak position
US Hot Country Songs (Billboard)	36
