= He Oughta Know That by Now =

Single by Lee Ann Womack

from the album There's More Where That Came From
- Released: April 11, 2005
- Genre: Country
- Length: 3:43
- Label: MCA Nashville
- Songwriters: Clint Ingersoll; Jeremy Spillman
- Producer: Byron Gallimore

Lee Ann Womack singles chronology
"I May Hate Myself in the Morning" (2004)	"He Oughta Know That by Now" (2005)	"Twenty Years and Two Husbands Ago" (2005)

"He Oughta Know That by Now" is a song written by Clint Ingersoll and Jeremy Spillman, and recorded by American country music artist Lee Ann Womack. It was released in April 2005 as the second single from her album There's More Where That Came From. The song was a Top 30 hit on the U.S. Hot Country Songs chart.

== Chart performance ==
Chart (2005)	Peak position
US Hot Country Songs (Billboard)	22
US Bubbling Under Hot 100 (Billboard)	16
