= Trouble in Mind (EP) =

EP by Lee Ann Womack
- Released: April 18, 2015
- Studio: Suma (Painesville, Ohio)
- Genre: Country
- Length: 10:04
- Label: Sugar Hill
- Producer: Frank Liddell

Lee Ann Womack chronology
The Way I'm Livin' (2014)	Trouble in Mind (2015)	The Lonely, the Lonesome & the Gone (2017)

Trouble in Mind is an extended play album by American country artist Lee Ann Womack. The album was released on April 18, 2015, via Sugar Hill Records (bluegrass label) and was produced by Frank Liddell. It was released exclusively as a limited edition vinyl record and contained three new tracks. Trouble in Mind was made to be unlike Womack's previous releases because it featured limited musical production. The record only included Womack's voice and a guitarist as the primary instruments.

== Background and content ==
Womack and her spouse/producer Frank Liddell discussed the intention to record an album with limited background production. The pair decided on choosing "handpicked compositions" and one musician for the album. American guitarist Richard Bennett was chosen as the record's session player. Bennett used "vintage" guitars for the recording process. The album was recorded in Liddell and Womack's personal studio. Hannahlee Allers of The Boot music blog called the album a "less is more approach", which followed a similar style to that of Womack's 2014 studio album The Way I'm Livin'. In an interview with Rolling Stone, Womack spoke about her reasons for the project,

"I love the idea of mixing things up, but stripping them back...When you make things that basic, you can hear all the commonalities between, say, Lightnin' Hopkins and Ralph Stanley. When you make those connections, that's when it gets interesting."

Three tracks were chosen for the release of Trouble in Mind. The title track is a blues standard that has been recorded by various musical artists. The second track, "Where Have All the Average People Gone", was first made commercially successful by Roger Miller. Music journalist and critic Stephen L. Betts called the song a "gem" that was "unearthed" for the album's preparation. The third and final track, "I've Just Seen the Rock of Ages", was notably recorded by Ralph Stanley in a gospel-bluegrass format.

== Critical reception and release ==
Trouble in Mind has mainly received positive responses from music critics and journalists. Stephen L. Betts of Rolling Stone commented, "For an artist who is so deeply rooted in traditional country music that the cover of her 2005 album, There's More Where That Came From, was designed to resemble a classic country LP, doing something unique to celebrate next month's upcoming Record Store Day isn't surprising." Jessica Nicholson of the trade publication series MusicRow praised Womack's musical choices, stating, "Trouble In Mind is just the latest in a string of interesting collaborations Womack has taken part in during recent months. She co-hosted the International Bluegrass Music Awards with bluegrass stalwart Jerry Douglas, participated in a CMT Crossroads taping with John Legend, recorded with Ralph Stanley, and more."

The extended play was released on Record Store Day on April 18, 2015. It was issued only as a 12 inch vinyl record on Womack's label, Sugar Hill Records. It was available for a limited time period at selected record stores.

== Track listing ==
No.	Title	Writer(s)	Length
1.	"Trouble in Mind"	Richard M. Jones	3:13
2.	"Where Have All the Average People Gone"	Dennis Linde	3:39
3.	"I've Just Seen the Rock of Ages"	John Brenton Preston	3:52
Total length:			10:04

== Credits and personnel ==
- Engineered and mastered at the Suma Recording Studio
- Chuck Ainlay – mastering
- Richard Bennett – guitar
- Paul Hamann – engineering
- Jonathan Krop – art direction, graphics
- Frank Liddell – producer
- John Scarpati – photography
- Lee Ann Womack – lead vocals

== Release history ==
Region	Date	Format(s)	Label
United States	April 18, 2015	vinyl	Sugar Hill
