= Call Me Crazy =

Studio album by Lee Ann Womack
- Released: October 21, 2008
- Studios: Sound Stage Studios and Front Stage Studio (Nashville, Tennessee); Paragon Studios (Franklin, Tennessee); Keith Harter Music Studios (San Antonio, Texas)
- Genre: Country
- Length: 46:10
- Label: MCA Nashville
- Producer: Tony Brown

Lee Ann Womack chronology
There's More Where That Came From (2005)	Call Me Crazy (2008)	The Way I'm Livin' (2014)

Singles from Call Me Crazy
- 1. "Last Call" Released: June 30, 2008; 2. "Solitary Thinkin'" Released: April 11, 2009

Call Me Crazy is the seventh studio album by American country music singer Lee Ann Womack, released on October 21, 2008 via MCA Nashville Records. It is her first studio release in three years, as her previous album (2006's Finding My Way Back Home) was not released. The lead-off single to this album is "Last Call" which in late 2008 became Womack's first Top 20 country hit in three years. The album's second single, "Solitary Thinkin", was released in April 2009 and reached the Top 40 of the country charts, peaking at #39 in June 2009. The album was nominated for the Grammy Award for Best Country Album on December 2, 2009.

== Background ==
Womack told The Early Show, "Well, I always like to tell people, really, a lot of the songs just come from real life, whether I wrote them or other writers. You know, that's the beauty of country music, it's about real-life situations. And so I look for songs that really mean something to me, either I've been through it or I know somebody that's been through it. And something that really touches me."

== Content ==
"Last Call" is the first single release from this album. Written by Shane McAnally and Erin Enderlin, the song is Womack's first chart entry since "Finding My Way Back Home" in mid-2006.

The album was produced by Tony Brown. One track, "The Bees", features background vocals from Keith Urban, and "Everything but Quits" is a duet with George Strait. "The King of Broken Hearts," from Jim Lauderdale's 1991 album Planet of Love, was also previously recorded by Strait on the soundtrack to the 1993 film Pure Country. Additionally, the track "Either Way" was later recorded by its co-writer Chris Stapleton for his 2017 album From A Room: Volume 1, from which it was released as the first single.

== Critical reception ==
Professional ratings
Review scores
Source	Rating
Allmusic	link
Billboard	(favorable) link
Boston Globe	(favorable) link
Entertainment Weekly	A− link
Hartford Courant	(favorable)link at the Wayback Machine (archived April 12, 2009)
Slant Magazine	link
Norfolk Daily News	(favorable)
Newsday	B+
Performing Songwriter	(favorable)
The Philadelphia Inquirer	3.5/5 stars
No Depression	(favorable) link
Fort Worth Star-Telegram	4/5 stars

According to the music review aggregator Metacritic, which assigns a normalized rating out of 100 to reviews from mainstream critics, the album has received an average score of 73 out of 100, indicating "generally favorable reviews".

Carrie Pitzer of the Norfolk Daily News gave the album a positive review and wrote, "Slightly better (it's hard to improve upon an album of the year) than her last, Womack sounds more mature this time around as she offers advice and explanation." Glenn Gamboa of Newsday gave the album a B+ rating and wrote, "Womack takes her love of traditional country in a whole new direction. It simply makes you wish for more where that came from." Ken Tucker of Billboard gave the album a favorable review and wrote, "Just when you thought she couldn’t get any better, Lee Ann Womack surprises in a big way. The first-time combination of Womack and producer Tony Brown is overdue and magical.“Solitary Thinkin’” proves Womack has more soul than just about any other country female vocalist out there. All hail the queen of country. Editors at Performing Songwriter said, "This is a pure, full-on country album filled with tales of heartache and regret. How can any country music fan not fall under Womack’s spell? If you’ve ever been lamenting that pop crossover is infecting country music, this collection of mostly downbeat tales sung by one of country’s most glorious voices will, ironically, give you hope." Nick Cristiano of The Philadelphia Inquirer gave the album a three and a half star rating and wrote, "The only real misfire is "I Found It in You," the kind of generic power ballad that throws the power and beauty of the rest of Call Me Crazy into even greater relief" Dave Heaton of PopMatters gave the album a rating of 7 and wrote, "Call Me Crazy is best when Womack conveys the understanding that we’re all sinners, when musically she doesn’t try too hard to isolate herself from the sins. After all, in the world of country music, sin is never that far away."

Editors at No Depression wrote, "But it's not the poignant themes that set this album apart; Womack has tackled them before, if never so relentlessly. It is, naturally, Womack's voice, full of personality, clarity and caressing warmth, and so agile she could turn a melody inside-out and still wind up with a hook. Editors at the Fort Worth Star-Telegram gave the album four stars and wrote, "Womack remains one of Music City’s most underrated talents. Crazy, her seventh record, is an often gloomy assortment of broken-hearted love songs ideal for consuming on some lonely, overcast fall day." Cathalena E. Burch of the Arizona Daily Star wrote, "Crazy puts Womack through those trenches and then some, with songs that dip into the well from which Loretta, Patsy, Barbara, Dolly and Tammy drank so freely a generation or two ago. "Crazy" dances through all the emotions country music is supposed to embrace — sorrow, heartbreak, starting over, getting over and renewal." Michael McCall of Nashville Scene wrote, Womack "And her veteran producer combine traditional and contemporary ideas into spare, breathing arrangements that add nuance to the real-life dramas of Womack's well-chosen material. Call Me Crazy certainly succeeds creatively—let's hope radio sees the potential for these songs to bring a needed depth to the format as well." Werner Trieschmann of The Village Voice gave the album a mixed review and wrote, "There’s a palpable melancholy in Womack’s delivery, a resignation that makes you believe—all right, hope—that there’s a little more where that came from, and a little less of everything else."

Thom Jurek of AllMusic gave the album three and a half stars and wrote, "Call Me Crazy continues Womack's journey of creating her own sonic brand. Perhaps next time she will flex her star power more and insist on more production control." Sarah Rodman of the Boston Globe gave the album a favorable review and wrote,"In addition to the timeless-sounding tracks, "Crazy" includes a few olive branches to contemporary country radio. The best thing about those tunes is that even though they seem like bids for hits, they don't sound remotely like compromises. We'll take that kind of "Crazy" any day. Johnathon Keefe of Slant Magazine gave the album three and a half stars and said, "Of course, at this point in her career, there is little lingering doubt as to Womack's talent, so Crazy doesn't prove any new points regarding her strengths as a hard-country vocalist. "The Bees," which is given a progressive, new wave-inflected production that drives its lilting, familiar melody with a slap bass and a muffled drum loop. While traditionalists will inevitably bristle at the track, its relative subtlety makes it one of the album's sonic experiments that actually work. Chris Willman of Entertainment Weekly gave the album an A− rating and wrote, "This overdue follow-up Call Me Crazy brings in a new producer (Tony Brown) but has Lee Ann Womack in much the same traditionalist mode, sounding like a distaff version of George Jones at his finest." Thomas Kintner of the Hartford Courant gave the album a positive review and wrote, "The Texas-bred singer returns with "Call Me Crazy," a similar assortment of tunes that are modern and accessible, but with a classic sensibility. Her singing pretty and poised, Womack caresses each song as she extracts its core emotions."

Matt Bjorke of Roughstock gave the album a favorable review and wrote, "At the end of the day, Call Me Crazy is an album that should please fans of both the traditional and contemporary sides of Lee Ann Womack. It's a well-written, sung, played and recorded album that only helps to prove why Lee Ann Womack is one of modern country music's most treasured artists." Jack Lowe of About.com gave the album four and a half stars and wrote, "Call Me Crazy has been 3 years in the making, and has been well worth the wait. Very smooth and easy to listen to from start to finish." Jasper Jones of 411 Mania gave the album a rating of 7 and said, "For all the gold contained in Call Me Crazy, there seems to be just as much garbage." Christian Hoard of Rolling Stone gave the album three stars and said, "The album sounds way more professional than crazy, but tunefulness this pleasant works out just fine." Kevin J. Coyne of Country Universe gave the album three and a half stars and said, "Womack is such a talented performer that the album still satisfies in many ways, but it’s not quite up to the bar she has set so high with her best work." Editors at ACountry gave the album a positive review and wrote, "It's apparent this is music lovingly created by an artist who is reveling in what she was born to do." Brian Mansfield of USA Today gave the albums three and a half stars and wrote, "Womack rarely pushes the tempo of her sweet countrypolitan and dusty Southern soul, but the emotional dynamic is always intense."

== Track listing ==
Standard edition
No.	Title	Writer(s)	Length
1.	"Last Call"	Erin Enderlin, Shane McAnally	3:17
2.	"Either Way"	Chris Stapleton, Kendell Marvel, Tim James	3:39
3.	"Solitary Thinkin'"	Waylon Payne	3:58
4.	"New Again"	Lee Ann Womack, Dale Dodson, Casey Beathard	3:56
5.	"I Found It In You"	Nash, Michael T. Post, Whitney Duncan	3:46
6.	"Have You Seen That Girl"	Womack, Dodson, Dean Dillon	3:23
7.	"The Bees"	Natalie Hemby, Daniel Tashian	5:08
8.	"I Think I Know"	Tom Shapiro, Mark Nesler, Tony Martin	3:28
9.	"If These Walls Could Talk"	Womack, Dodson	3:33
10.	"Everything but Quits (duet with George Strait)"	Womack, Dodson, Dillon	3:51
11.	"The King of Broken Hearts"	Jim Lauderdale	3:49
12.	"The Story of My Life"	Hillary Lindsey, Brett James, Angelo Petraglia	4:22

== Personnel ==
Credits adapted from liner notes.

- Lee Ann Womack – vocals, backing vocals (2, 4, 12)
- John Barlow Jarvis – acoustic piano (1, 2, 5–8, 10–12), Hammond B3 organ (3, 9)
- Steve Nathan – Hammond B3 organ (1, 5, 6, 8, 11), Wurlitzer electric piano (2), Rhodes electric piano (3), synthesizers (3), keyboards (4, 10, 12), synth accordion (7), acoustic piano (9)
- Brent Mason – electric guitars, electric guitar solo (3), gut-string guitar (6)
- Bryan Sutton – acoustic guitar (1, 3, 4, 8, 11, 12)
- Randy Scruggs – acoustic guitar (2, 5–7, 9, 10)
- Ilya Toshinsky – electric guitar solo (2), electric guitars (5)
- Paul Franklin – steel guitar
- Aubrey Haynie – mandolin (1, 8), fiddle (3, 4, 11, 12)
- Michael Rhodes – bass (1–10, 12), upright bass (11)
- Greg Morrow – drums, bongos (10)
- Eric Darken – percussion (2, 5)
- Larry Franklin – fiddle (1, 2, 7, 9, 10), mandolin (5, 6)
- The Nashville String Machine – strings (10)
- Bergen White – string arrangements (10)
- Curtis Young – backing vocals (1)
- Chris Stapleton – backing vocals (2)
- Kim Keyes – backing vocals (3, 5)
- Judson Spence – backing vocals (3)
- Jason Sellers – backing vocals (4, 10, 12)
- Perry Coleman – backing vocals (5)
- Morgane Hayes – backing vocals (6)
- Melissa Hayes – backing vocals (7)
- Keith Urban – backing vocals (7)
- Wes Hightower – backing vocals (8, 11)
- George Strait – vocals (10)
- Aubrie Sellers – backing vocals (12)

=== Production ===
- Joe Fisher – A&R
- Brian Wright – A&R
- Stephanie Wright – A&R
- Tony Brown – producer
- Chuck Ainlay – recording, mixing, additional recording
- Brian Calhoon – recording assistant, mix assistant
- Jim Cooley – recording assistant, mix assistant, additional recording
- Todd Tidwell – recording assistant, mix assistant
- Bob Ludwig – mastering at Gateway Mastering (Portland, Maine)
- Erin McAnally – project coordinator
- Craig Allen – design
- Danny Clinch – photography
- Jay Palaniuk – hair
- Mally Roncal – make-up
- Gillian Steinhardt – wardrobe stylist
- Erv Woolsey – management

== Promotion and chart performance ==
One way Womack promoted the album was to tour. Womack also previewed the album in Nashville, Tennessee on October 20 at Nashville's War Auditorium, singing nearly all of the songs on the album. She also previewed the album at the Jazz Lincoln Center in New York City on September 17.

Call Me Crazy debuted at #4 on Billboard's Top Country Albums chart and #23 on the Billboard 200, becoming Womack's first album in nearly ten years to miss the Top 20.

=== Weekly charts ===
Chart (2008)	Peak position
US Billboard 200	23
US Top Country Albums (Billboard)	4

=== Year-end charts ===
Chart (2009)	Position
US Top Country Albums (Billboard)	67

=== Singles ===
Year	Single	Chart Positions	
Year	Single	US Country	US
2008	"Last Call"	14	77
2009	"Solitary Thinkin'"	39	—
