= On Again Tonight =

Single by Trent Willmon

from the album A Little More Livin'
- Released: February 4, 2006
- Genre: Country
- Length: 3:40
- Label: Columbia
- Songwriter(s): Marv Green, Phillip White, Jimmy Melton
- Producer(s): Frank Rogers

Trent Willmon singles chronology
"The Good Life" (2005)	"On Again Tonight" (2006)	"So Am I" (2006)

"On Again Tonight" is a song recorded by American country music artist Trent Willmon. It was released in February 2006 as the first single from the album A Little More Livin'. The song reached #27 on the Billboard Hot Country Songs chart. The song was written by Marv Green, Phillip White and Jimmy Melton.

== Chart performance ==
Chart (2006)	Peak position
US Hot Country Songs (Billboard)	27
US Bubbling Under Hot 100 Singles (Billboard)	24
