= Crazy Town (song) =

Single by Jason Aldean

from the album Wide Open
- Released: March 1, 2010
- Recorded: 2008–09
- Genre: Country rock
- Length: 3:03
- Label: Broken Bow
- Songwriters: Rodney Clawson; Brett Jones
- Producer: Michael Knox

Jason Aldean singles chronology
"The Truth" (2009)	"Crazy Town" (2010)	"My Kinda Party" (2010)

"Crazy Town" is a song written by Brett Jones and Rodney Clawson and recorded by American country music artist Jason Aldean. It was released in March 2010 as the fourth and final single from Aldean's 2009 album Wide Open. It has become his tenth consecutive Top 20 hit on the US Billboard Hot Country Songs chart with a peak at number 2, behind Miranda Lambert's "The House That Built Me". It is also Aldean's first single to not have an accompanying music video.

== Content ==
"Crazy Town" is an up-tempo country rock song in which the narrator describes the Nashville music scene as being a "crazy town."

== Critical reception ==
Matt Bjorke of Roughstock stated the song "accents Aldean's voice a bit allowing him to hide the nasal sound that sometimes pops up." Blake Boldt of Engine 145 gave it a "thumbs-down," summarizing his review by saying "'Crazy' is all power and no purpose."

== Appearances in media ==
New York Yankees outfielder Brett Gardner uses the song as his walk-up theme. Atlanta Braves relief pitcher Jonny Venters comes out to pitch with this song. The Nashville Predators also use the song at their home games in a pregame video. The song was also used by the Predators during their walkout at the 2020 NHL Winter Classic. The song was also an official theme for WWE SummerSlam 2022

== Chart performance ==
On the week ending March 6, 2010, "Crazy Town" debuted at number 49 on the U.S. Billboard Hot Country Songs chart and moved up the following week to 36. It debuted at 96 on the Canadian Hot 100 for the week of June 18, 2010.

Chart (2010)	Peak position
Canada Country (Billboard)	3
Canada Hot 100 (Billboard)	85
US Billboard Hot 100	51
US Hot Country Songs (Billboard)	2

=== Year-end charts ===
Chart (2010)	Position
US Country Songs (Billboard)	16

=== Certifications ===
Region	Certification	Certified units/sales
United States (RIAA)	Gold	500,000^{‡}
^{‡} Sales+streaming figures based on certification alone.
