= There Is a God =

Single by Lee Ann Womack
- Released: November 2, 2009
- Genre: Country
- Length: 4:15
- Label: MCA Nashville
- Songwriters: Chris DuBois; Ashley Gorley
- Producer: Tony Brown

Lee Ann Womack singles chronology
"Solitary Thinkin'" (2009)	"There Is a God" (2009)	"The Way I'm Livin'" (2014)

"There Is a God" is a song written by Chris DuBois and Ashley Gorley, and recorded by American country music artist Lee Ann Womack. It was released as a single in November 2009.

== Content ==
"There Is a God" is a ballad, backed primarily by acoustic guitar, with steel guitar fills and strings. The song's narrator describes everything she sees, from things of beauty ("Watch a flock of birds against the morning sun / Close your eyes and listen to the river run") to life's miracles ("Hearing the doctor say he can't explain it, but the cancer's gone"), as being proof that "there is a God."

The song was previously recorded by Trent Willmon for his 2007 album Broken In. His version was released as a single in late 2007, although it failed to chart. Womack recorded her own version of the song and a positive response from country radio led to its single release.

Reba McEntire later covered the song for her 2017 album, Sing It Now: Songs of Faith & Hope.

== Critical reception ==
The song was met with mixed reception among music critics. Matt Bjorke of Roughstock reviewed the song favorably, and described it as a return to a more "contemporary" country sound: "This song may not please the traditionalists who enjoyed the last couple of albums from Lee Ann Womack but it’s also not as ‘pop’ as “[I Hope You] Dance” was but it might just reach as many people with the strong lyric and Lee Ann’s expert delivery of them." Kevin John Coyne of Country Universe gave the song a B−, stating that the lyrics "rubbed [him] the wrong way" and that Womack's performance was "tepid" and lacking in conviction. Country Weekly reviewer Chris Neal said that the song was "lovely but bland" and criticized the "potshots at science" in the bridge ("Science says it's all just circumstance / Like the whole world's just an accident"), giving it three stars out of five.

== Chart performance ==
"There Is a God" debuted at number 60 on the U.S. Billboard Hot Country Songs chart for the week of November 14, 2009. It became her twenty-first Top 40 single on that chart, reaching a peak of 32 in March 2010.

Chart (2009–2010)	Peak position
US Hot Country Songs (Billboard)	32
