= Last Call (Lee Ann Womack song) =

Single by Lee Ann Womack

from the album Call Me Crazy
- Released: June 30, 2008
- Genre: Country
- Length: 3:17
- Label: MCA Nashville
- Songwriters: Erin Enderlin; Shane McAnally
- Producer: Tony Brown

Lee Ann Womack singles chronology
"Finding My Way Back Home" (2006)	"Last Call" (2008)	"Solitary Thinkin'" (2009)

Music video
- "Last Call" at CMT.com

"Last Call" is a song written by Erin Enderlin and Shane McAnally, and recorded by American country music artist Lee Ann Womack. It was released in June 2008 as the lead-off single from Womack's album Call Me Crazy, which was released in October 2008. In December, the song reached number 14 on the Billboard Hot Country Songs chart, becoming Womack's first top 20 hit in three years.

== Content ==
The song is a country ballad that begins with the female narrator noticing her phone ringing, and refusing to answer it because she recognizes the number. The woman is aware that the male character is most likely in a bar and drinking alcohol. Therefore, she refuses to answer her phone because she knows that she is always his "last call". This is a play on the bartending term "last call", which refers to the last round of alcohol served before the bar closes for the night.

== Critical reception ==
"Last Call" was well received by critics, being met with several positive reviews and was nominated for two awards.

Allmusic reviewer Thom Jurek called the song " a classic example of what makes Womack such a fascinating and emotionally resonant singer." Country Universe gave it an A rating, and considered that "Last Call" was reminiscent of her 2005 hit, "I May Hate Myself in the Morning". The song received a "thumbs up" review from Engine 145 reviewer Brady Vercher, who also compared the song to "I May Hate Myself in the Morning" and said that "although the lyric doesn't accentuate the emotional conflict, Womack's vocal dips with indecision as she delivers a splendid performance." This song was number 52 on Rolling Stone's list of the 100 Best Songs of 2008. Editors at Billboard wrote, "Haunting single “Last Call” is song-of-the-year material on a number of levels: songwriting, vocal performance and production." Chuck Arnold of People Magazine listed the song as a hot download and wrote, "Lee Ann Womack will have you busting out the hankies with the touching breakup ballad "Last Call."

In December 2008, the song received a Grammy Award nomination for Best Female Country Vocal Performance. "Last Call" also received a nomination for Female Video of the Year in the 2009 CMT Music Awards.

== Music video ==
A music video directed by Trey Fanjoy was released for "Last Call." The video is done entirely in black and white, and was shot in New York City. In it, Womack is seen strolling along nighttime streets, standing on the roof deck of a tall building during daytime and riding a cab at night, while the song's lyrics are illustrated by scenes of a man drinking in an almost empty bar which is about to close for the night. He attempts to call Womack, which prompts her to examine her phone and not answer. Singer Clayton Stroope of the band Thriving Ivory is featured as Womack's lover in the video.

== Personnel ==
Credits adapted from Call Me Crazy liner notes.

- Eric Darken — percussion
- Larry Franklin – fiddle
- Paul Franklin – steel guitar
- Aubrey Haynie — mandolin
- John Barlow Jarvis — piano
- Brent Mason — electric guitar
- Greg Morrow — drums
- Steve Nathan — electric piano, electric organ
- Michael Rhodes — bass guitar
- Bryan Sutton — acoustic guitar
- Lee Ann Womack — lead vocals
- Curtis Young — backing vocals

== Charts ==
"Last Call" debuted at number 56 on the U.S. Billboard Hot Country Songs chart in July 2008. The song reached a peak of number 14 in February 2009, after spending 36 weeks on the chart.

Chart (2008–2009)	Peak position
US Hot Country Songs (Billboard)	14
US Billboard Hot 100	77

== Certifications ==
Region	Certification	Certified units/sales
United States (RIAA)	Gold	500,000^{‡}
^{‡} Sales+streaming figures based on certification alone.
