= A Little More Livin' =

Studio album by Trent Willmon
- Released: June 13, 2006
- Genre: Country
- Length: 41:15
- Label: Columbia Nashville
- Producer: Frank Rogers

Trent Willmon chronology
Trent Willmon (2004)	A Little More Livin' (2006)	Broken In (2008)

Singles from A Little More Livin'
- 1. "On Again Tonight" Released: January 30, 2006; 2. "So Am I" Released: August 21, 2006

Professional ratings
Review scores
Source	Rating
AllMusic	3.5/5 stars

A Little More Livin' is the second studio album by American country music singer Trent Willmon, released on June 13, 2006 on Columbia Records Nashville. It features the singles "On Again Tonight" and "So Am I", which peaked at #27 and #59 on the Hot Country Songs charts, respectively. After the latter peaked, Willmon exited Columbia's roster.

== Track listing ==
No.	Title	Writer(s)	Length
1.	"Good One Comin' On"	Lee Roy Parnell; David Lee Murphy; Gary Nicholson	3:32
2.	"So Am"	Trent Willmon; Chris DuBois	3:31
3.	"On Again Tonight"	Marv Green; Jimmy Melton; Phillip White	3:40
4.	"Sometimes I Miss Ya"	Willmon; Brandon Kinney	3:38
5.	"Love Don't Have to Be So Hard"	Brett James; Doug Johnson	4:05
6.	"Surprise"	Wilson; Kinney	3:16
7.	"Island"	Willmon; Bart Butler; Dave Turnbull	3:15
8.	"Ropin' Pen"	Willmon; Kinney	3:48
9.	"A Night in the Ground"	Chris Stapleton; Craig Wiseman	3:23
10.	"Louisiana Rain"	Willmon; Stapleton	3:54
11.	"Good Horses to Ride"	Willmon; David Frasier	5:07

== Personnel ==
- Jim "Moose" Brown – piano
- J. T. Corenflos – electric guitar, baritone guitar
- Chad Cromwell – drums
- Eric Darken – percussion
- Larry Franklin – fiddle, mandolin
- Kevin "Swine" Grantt – bass guitar
- David Grissom – electric guitar, baritone guitar
- Wes Hightower – background vocals
- Kirk "Jelly Roll" Johnson – harmonica
- Mike Johnson – steel guitar
- Tim Lauer – accordion
- Frank Rogers – baritone guitar
- Bryan Sutton – acoustic guitar, banjo, gut string guitar, bouzouki
- Dennis Wage – B3 organ
- Trent Willmon – lead vocals

== Chart performance ==
Chart (2006)	Peak position
US Top Country Albums (Billboard)	19
US Billboard 200	70
