= Twenty Years and Two Husbands Ago =

Single by Lee Ann Womack

from the album There's More Where That Came From
- Written: 2004
- Released: November 21, 2005
- Genre: Country
- Length: 3:49
- Label: MCA Nashville
- Songwriters: Lee Ann Womack; Dean Dillon; Dale Dodson
- Producer: Byron Gallimore

Lee Ann Womack singles chronology
"He Oughta Know That by Now" (2005)	"Twenty Years and Two Husbands Ago" (2005)	"Finding My Way Back Home" (2006)

"Twenty Years and Two Husbands Ago" is a song by American country music artist Lee Ann Womack, taken from her sixth studio album There's More Where That Came From (2005). This is the first single of Womack's career that she had a co-writing credit on and the only track from the album that she had a writer's credit on, co-writing it with Dean Dillon and Dale Dodson. It was released to country radio on November 21, 2005, as the third and final single from the album.

A minor hit, it peaked at number 32 on the US Hot Country Songs chart. Womack would notably perform the song at the 2005 CMA Awards.

== Content ==
In the song, Womack sings about regretting the loss of her youthful self.

== Critical reception ==
Matt Cibula of PopMatters gave the song a mostly positive review, saying that it was a good song. David Cantwell of No Depression called it the best song from There's More Where That Came From. Billboard editors called the track "tender and world-weary."

== Music video ==
Paul Boyd directed the music video for "Twenty Years and Two Husbands Ago". The music video opens with Womack looking in a mirror doing her make-up. There are scenes of her leaving a car, being in an outdoor dining room, and hanging out with her friends. The video has a retro style, taken from the 1960s, and was compared to Faith Hill's music video for "Like We Never Loved at All".

== Commercial performance ==
"Twenty Years and Two Husbands Ago" debuted at number 56 on the US Billboard Hot Country Songs chart the week of December 3, 2005, with 730,000 audience impressions. It reached number 32 the week of February 11, 2006, spending 17 weeks in total on the chart.

== Personnel ==
Taken from the liner notes of There's More Where That Came From.

- Tom Bukovac – electric guitar
- Mark Casstevens – acoustic guitar
- Rusty Danmyer – pedal steel guitar
- Shannon Forrest – drums
- Aubrey Haynie – fiddle
- Wes Hightower – backing vocals
- Luke Laird – backing vocals
- Steve Nathan – piano
- Randy Scruggs – acoustic guitar
- Bergen White – string section arrangements
- Lee Ann Womack – vocals
- Glenn Worf – bass
- Nashville String Machine – string section

== Charts ==
Chart (2005–2006)	Peak position
US Hot Country Songs (Billboard)	32
US Country Top 50 (Radio & Records)	28
