= Solitary Thinkin' =

Single by Lee Ann Womack

from the album Call Me Crazy
- Released: April 13, 2009
- Genre: Country
- Length: 3:58
- Label: MCA Nashville
- Songwriter(s): Waylon Payne
- Producer(s): Tony Brown

Lee Ann Womack singles chronology
"Last Call" (2008)	"Solitary Thinkin'" (2009)	"There Is a God" (2009)

"Solitary Thinkin'" is a song recorded by American country music artist Lee Ann Womack. It was released in April 2009 as the second single from the album Call Me Crazy. The song reached #39 on the Billboard Hot Country Songs chart. The song was written by Waylon Payne.

== Personnel ==
Credits adapted from Call Me Crazy liner notes.

- Paul Franklin – steel guitar
- Aubrey Haynie – fiddle
- John Barlow Jarvis — electric organ
- Kim Keyes — backing vocals
- Brent Mason — electric guitar
- Greg Morrow — drums
- Steve Nathan — electric piano, synthesizer
- Michael Rhodes — bass guitar
- Judson Spence — backing vocals
- Bryan Sutton — acoustic guitar
- Lee Ann Womack — lead vocals

== Chart performance ==
Chart (2009)	Peak position
US Hot Country Songs (Billboard)	39
