= Trent Willmon (album) =

Studio album by Trent Willmon
- Released: October 12, 2004
- Genre: Country
- Label: Columbia Nashville
- Producer: Frank Rogers

Trent Willmon chronology
Trent Willmon (2004)	A Little More Livin' (2006)

Singles from Trent Willmon
- 1. "Beer Man" Released: March 22, 2004; 2. "Dixie Rose Deluxe's Honky-Tonk, Feed Store, Gun Shop, Used Car, Beer, Bait, BBQ, Barber Shop, Laundromat" Released: July 19, 2004; 3. "Home Sweet Holiday Inn" Released: November 8, 2004; 4. "The Good Life" Released: February 7, 2005

Trent Willmon is the debut studio album by American country music artist Trent Willmon. Released in 2004 on Columbia Records Nashville, it features the singles "Beer Man", "Dixie Rose Deluxe's Honky-Tonk, Feed Store, Gun Shop, Used Car, Beer, Bait, BBQ, Barber Shop, Laundromat", "Home Sweet Holiday Inn", and "The Good Life", all of which charted on the Hot Country Songs charts between 2004 and 2005. "Beer Man" was the highest peaking of the four, reaching #30.

"She Don't Love Me" was originally recorded under the title "She Don't Love Me (She Don't Hate Me)" by Billy Ray Cyrus on his 2003 album Time Flies, and was later recorded by Blake Shelton on his 2007 album Pure BS.

== Critical reception ==
Professional ratings
Review scores
Source	Rating
Allmusic	}
Billboard	favorable

William Ruhlmann of Allmusic rated the album 3.5 out of 5 stars, saying that it was "a fairly typical piece of Nashville product. Decked out in the de rigueur cowboy hat, the West Texas native sings in a matter-of-fact low tenor...but his voice is an efficient delivery device for the songs, which are played in what passes for standard country in the early 21st century". Ray Waddell of Billboard was favorable, praising Willmon's "sturdy baritone" and the "mixture of lightweight but fun party cuts...and well-drawn heartfelt fare".

No.	Title	Writer(s)	Length
1.	"Dixie Rose Deluxe's Honky-Tonk, Feed Store, Gun Shop, Used Car, Beer, Bait, BBQ, Barber Shop, Laundromat"	Willmon; Michael P. Heeney	3:24
2.	"Beer Man"	Trent Willmon; Casey Beathard	3:53
3.	"Home Sweet Holiday Inn"	Willmon; Jameson Clark; Chris Stapleton	3:48
4.	"She Don't Love Me"	Beathard; Jay Knowles	2:51
5.	"The Good Life"	Willmon; Bobby Pinson	2:50
6.	"Population 81"	Liz Hengber; Stapleton	4:16
7.	"Medina Daydreaming"	Willmon	4:46
8.	"The Wishing Well"	Willmon; Jeremy Spillman	4:07
9.	"All Day Long"	Willmon; Tony Martin; Mark Nesler	4:37
10.	"Every Now and Then"	Willmon; Pinson; Spillman	3:51
11.	"Here"	Spillman	3:51

== Personnel ==
- Beer Man Backup Singers – background vocals on "Beer Man"
- Tom Bukovac – electric guitar, baritone guitar, hi-strung guitar
- Chad Cromwell – drums
- Eric Darken – percussion, jaw harp
- Larry Franklin – fiddle, mandolin
- Kevin "Swine" Grantt – bass guitar
- Aubrey Haynie – fiddle, mandolin
- Wes Hightower – background vocals
- Mike Johnson – steel guitar, Dobro
- Jeff King – electric guitar, baritone guitar, hi-strung guitar
- Alison Krauss – background vocals
- Tim Lauer – accordion
- B. James Lowry – acoustic guitar, banjo, gut string guitar
- Gordon Mote – Hammond B-3 organ, piano, Wurlitzer
- Frank Rogers – electric guitar, soloist
- Chris Stapleton – background vocals
- Bryan Sutton – acoustic guitar, banjo, gut string guitar
- Trent Willmon – lead vocals

Sound of a beer being poured on "Beer Man" performed by Frank Rogers and Trent Willmon.

== Chart performance ==
Chart (2004)	Peak position
U.S. Billboard Top Country Albums	22
U.S. Billboard 200	150
U.S. Billboard Top Heatseekers	5
