= The Way I'm Livin' =

Studio album by Lee Ann Womack
- Released: September 23, 2014
- Genre: Neotraditional country; Americana; roots revival
- Length: 46:20
- Label: Sugar Hill
- Producer: Chuck Ainlay Frank Liddell Glenn Worf

Lee Ann Womack chronology
Call Me Crazy (2008)	The Way I'm Livin' (2014)	Trouble in Mind (2015)

Singles from The Way I'm Livin'
- 1. "The Way I'm Livin'" Released: May 22, 2014; 2. "Send It On Down" Released: January 26, 2015; 3. "Chances Are" Released: October 5, 2015

The Way I'm Livin' is the eighth studio album by American country music recording artist Lee Ann Womack. The album was released via Sugar Hill Records on September 23, 2014. Her first album in six years, following 2008's Call Me Crazy, this album sees Womack embrace roots music and Americana alongside neotraditional country rather than the country pop sound that was prevalent in several previous releases.

== Production ==
The Way I'm Livin was recorded and mixed by Chuck Ainlay at Sound Stage Studios in Nashville, Tennessee. Additional recording was done by Brandon Schexnayder and Christian Best at Dogtown Studios in Nashville, and Monique Studios in Cork, Ireland. The album was produced by Chuck Ainlay, Glenn Worf and Womack's husband Frank Liddell.

== Critical reception and accolades ==
Professional ratings
Aggregate scores
Source	Rating
Metacritic	84/100
Review scores
Source	Rating
AllMusic	4.5/5 stars
American Songwriter	4/5 stars
Christgau’s Consumer Guide	(2-star Honorable Mention)
Country Weekly	A
Billboard	4/5 stars
The Daily Telegraph	4/5 stars
Q	3/5 stars
Tom Hull	A−
Uncut	8/10
USA Today	4/4 stars
Country Standard Time	(favorable)

According to Metacritic, The Way I'm Livin' received a weighted average of 84 out of 100, based on 7 mainstream critic reviews, indicating "Universal Acclaim". In his review for USA Today, Brian Mansfield compares the album, which is "rooted in gospel and hymns", to "Dolly Parton's finest". Mansfield noted, "Her run-ins with the devil may seem uncomfortably specific, but the swelling steel guitars carry her as if on angels' wings."

In his review for AllMusic, Stephen Thomas Erlewine observes that The Way I'm Livin' "plays like a classic album: it's a record where the sum is greater than the individual parts". Hal Horowitz, in his review in American Songwriter, writes, "The resulting comeback doesn't always click but when it does, the artist can rebound with some of their best work". Horowitz goes on to write, "This is a triumph for country music that's never musty yet still harkens back to a simpler, less glitzy time when emotions drove songs, not simplistic clichés."

In his review in Billboard magazine, Chuck Dauphin writes, "Was it worth the wait or has Womack stayed away from music-making too long? The answer is a very definitive one, as the Texas native reclaims her spot as one of country's most expressive and distinctive vocalists." Writing for The Daily Telegraph, Martin Chilton writes, "She succeeds admirably with The Way I'm Livin', a moving and powerful set of songs, right from the gorgeous opening prelude Fly ... It's great to have Lee Ann Womack back with such a sad and lovely album, which has an eye-catching cover."

== Commercial performance ==
The album debuted on the Billboard 200 at No. 99 and on the Top Country Albums at No. 18, selling 4,300 copies for the week. As of February 2015, the album has sold 14,600 copies in the US.

== Track listing ==
No.	Title	Writer(s)	Length
1.	"Fly"	Brent Cobb, Reed Foehl	2:31
2.	"All His Saints"	Mindy Smith	3:22
3.	"Chances Are"	Hayes Carll	3:41
4.	"The Way I'm Livin'"	Adam Wright	3:43
5.	"Send It on Down"	Chris Knight, David Leone	4:06
6.	"Don't Listen to the Wind"	Julie Miller	4:00
7.	"Same Kind of Different"	Natalie Hemby, Adam Hood	2:55
8.	"Out on the Weekend"	Neil Young	4:33
9.	"Nightwind"	Bruce Robison	3:34
10.	"Sleeping with the Devil"	Brennen Leigh	3:18
11.	"Not Forgotten You"	Robison	3:19
12.	"Tomorrow Night in Baltimore"	Kenny Price	3:23
13.	"When I Come Around"	Mando Saenz	3:55
Total length:			46:20

Walmart Deluxe edition
No.	Title	Writer(s)	Length
14.	"Satisfied Mind"	Joe "Red" Hayes, Jack Rhodes	3:28
15.	"Cup of Loneliness"	George Jones, Burl Stevens	2:18

== Personnel ==
As per liner notes. Musicians

- Lee Ann Womack – vocals
- Mac McAnally – acoustic piano, Rhodes electric piano, keyboards, Hammond B3 organ, acoustic guitars, mandocello, backing vocals
- Mike Rojas – accordion
- Duke Levine – electric guitars, acoustic guitars
- Kenny Greenberg – additional electric guitars
- Paul Franklin – steel guitar
- Glenn Worf – bass, upright bass
- Matt Chamberlain – drums, percussion
- Tom Hambridge – bass drum
- Hank Singer – fiddle
- Chris Carmichael – strings, string arrangements
- Ashley Cleveland – backing vocals
- Mick Flannery – backing vocals
- Anna Lise Liddell – backing vocals
- Frank Liddell – backing vocals
- Buddy Miller – backing vocals
- Charlie Pate – backing vocals
- Frank Rische – backing vocals
- Aubrie Sellers – backing vocals
- Jason Sellers – backing vocals
- Morgane Stapleton – backing vocals

=== Production ===
- Frank Liddell – producer
- Glenn Worf – producer
- Chuck Ainlay – producer, recording, mixing
- Christian Best – additional recording
- Kam Luchterhand – assistant engineer
- Brandon Schexnayder – assistant engineer
- Gavin Lurssen – mastering at Lurssen Mastering (Hollywood, California)
- Brittany Hamlin – production coordinator
- Jon Knop – design
- John Scarpati – art direction, photography

== Chart performance ==
Chart (2014)	Peak position
UK Country Albums (Official Charts)	5
US Billboard 200	99
US Top Country Albums (Billboard)	18
US Independent Albums (Billboard)	22
