= Finding My Way Back Home =

Single by Lee Ann Womack
- Released: August 15, 2006
- Genre: Country; contemporary country
- Length: 3:44
- Label: Mercury Nashville
- Songwriters: Chris Stapleton; Craig Wiseman
- Producer: Byron Gallimore

Lee Ann Womack singles chronology
"Twenty Years and Two Husbands Ago" (2005)	"Finding My Way Back Home" (2006)	"Last Call" (2008)

"Finding My Way Back Home" is a song written by Chris Stapleton and Craig Wiseman, and recorded American country music artist Lee Ann Womack. It was released as single in August 2006 and was produced by Byron Gallimore. The song would later becoming a charting country single. Despite the single's release, the song did not appear on an official album and Womack would later leave her record label. Released on Mercury Records Nashville, it was Womack's first single with the label after moving from MCA Records Nashville. The song reached number 37 on the Billboard Hot Country Songs chart in 2006.

== Background and content ==
Lee Ann Womack had several years of country music success in the 2000s with songs like "I Hope You Dance" and "Mendocino County Line." "Finding My Way Back Home" was Womack's first recording with Mercury Records Nashville. She was moved to the label imprint after many years of recording for MCA Records Nashville. According to a statement released by UMG Nashville, Womack was moved to Mercury so that the company could "even out the label rosters." "Finding My Way Back Home" was written by Chris Stapleton and Craig Wiseman. It was produced by Byron Gallimore.

== Release and reception ==
"Finding My Way Back Home" was released as a single via Mercury Records Nashville on August 15, 2006. Upon its release, the song has over one million "audience impressions," according to Billboard. This audience reception prompted the single to debut at number 46 on the Billboard Hot Country Songs chart, her highest-debuting single up to that point.

It spent a total of 14 weeks on the country songs chart and reached number 37 in October 2006. According to another article from Billboard, Womack was expected to release a new album through Mercury Records with the song included. However, the album's release was "tentative" was put on hold until early 2007. In 2007, Womack was moved back to MCA Records Nashville and the although the album was recorded, it was not released.

"Finding My Way Back Home" received mixed reviews from critics. David Cantwell of No Depression called the song's production to evoke an "island groove" that was also "pedal steel guitar-based." Kevin John Coyne of Country Universe called it a "stopgap single."

== Track listings ==
CD single

- "Finding My Way Back Home" (album version) – 3:39
- "Finding My Way Back Home" (radio edit) – 3:33

Digital single

- "Finding My Way Back Home" – 3:43

== Charts ==
Chart (2006)	Peak position
US Hot Country Songs (Billboard)	37
