= Compadre Records =

American record label

Compadre Records is a Houston-based independent record label that specializes in roots music. Compadre's artists include Billy Joe Shaver, Honeybrowne, Suzy Bogguss, Flaco Jimenez, James McMurtry, Trent Willmon, Hayes Carll, among others. Compadre has also released a successful series of Texas music compilations (Brewed in Texas; Texas Road Trip; Texas Outlaws; Brewed in Texas 2; Let's Step Outside).

It was purchased in 2007 by Mathew Knowles' company, Music World Entertainment.

== See also ==
- List of record labels
