= She's Country =

Single by Jason Aldean

Single by Jason Aldean

from the album Wide Open
- Released: December 1, 2008
- Recorded: 2008
- Genre: Country rock
- Length: 3:38
- Label: Broken Bow
- Songwriters: Danny Myrick; Bridgette Tatum
- Producer: Michael Knox

Jason Aldean singles chronology
"Relentless" (2008)	"She's Country" (2008)	"Big Green Tractor" (2009)

"She's Country" is a song written by Danny Myrick and Bridgette Tatum and recorded by American country music artist Jason Aldean. It was released in December 2008 as the first single from Aldean's 2009 album Wide Open. The song became Aldean's second number one hit on the U.S. Billboard Hot Country Songs chart in May 2009. This song is also used in the Rock Band Country Track Pack, and has been released as downloadable content for the Rock Band series.

== Content ==
This song is a moderate up-tempo featuring accompaniment from electric guitar. The verses outline various females from various rural places in the United States. Each is described as being "country" in nature "from her cowboy boots to her down home roots".

According to Country Weekly magazine, songwriter Bridgette Tatum got together with fellow songwriter Danny Myrick after thinking of a groove "that she didn't want to forget." They were thinking of several lyrics until Myrick added a guitar riff, and they thought of the title, "She's Country." When Myrick and Tatum finished the song, they recommended the song to Aldean.

== Critical reception ==
Pierce Greenberg of Engine 145 gave the song a “thumbs-down” rating. He described it as having "dumbed-down lyrics and amped-up, rock-based production", and said that it was a "step backwards" from his previous singles such as "Laughed Until We Cried". Blake Boldt of Country Universe gave the song a C− grade, saying that its lyrics were "cliché-laden" and sexist because of the oversimplified terms used to describe the women.

== Performance and music video ==
Aldean debuted the song in November 2008 at the Country Music Association awards shortly before its release as a single. Footage of the live performance was used as the song's music video. A second music video, based on the studio version of the song, was released in February 2009, and Jason Aldean returned to Wes Edwards, who directed his first four music videos to direct this music video. This music video shows Jason Aldean at his concerts, and during his touring. The video was voted number 35 on GAC's Top 50 Videos of the Year.

== Chart performance ==
The song debuted at number 51 on the U.S. Billboard Hot Country Songs chart for the chart week of December 6, 2008, and entered the Top 40 the week after. On the week of May 16, 2009, it became Aldean's second number one hit on the chart and his first since "Why" in May 2006. The song entered at number 90 the Billboard Hot 100 on the chart week of November 29, 2008 but fell off until the chart week of February 7, 2009, when it re-entered at number 88. The song became Aldean's first Top 40 hit on the Hot 100 chart after peaking at number 29. It was also certified double-platinum by the Recording Industry Association of America (RIAA) as a digital single on October 5, 2012, as well as being certified gold as a mastertone on August 25, 2009.

As of June 2011, the song has sold 1,612,000 copies in the United States, making it the second best-selling song by a male solo country artist, only being surpassed by Aldean's "Big Green Tractor".

Chart (2008–2009)	Peak Position
Canada Country (Billboard)	14
Canada Hot 100 (Billboard)	90
US Billboard Hot 100	29
US Hot Country Songs (Billboard)	1

=== Year-end charts ===
Chart (2009)	Position
US Country Songs (Billboard)	14

== Certifications ==
Region	Certification	Certified units/sales
United States (RIAA)	3× Platinum	3,000,000^{‡}
United States (RIAA) Mastertone	Gold	500,000^{*}
^{*} Sales figures based on certification alone.^{‡} Sales+streaming figures based on certification alone.
