= Big Green Tractor =

Single by Jason Aldean

from the album Wide Open
- Released: May 26, 2009
- Recorded: 2008–09
- Genre: Country
- Length: 3:24
- Label: Broken Bow
- Songwriters: Jim Collins; David Lee Murphy
- Producer: Michael Knox

Jason Aldean singles chronology
"She's Country" (2008)	"Big Green Tractor" (2009)	"The Truth" (2009)

"Big Green Tractor" is a song written by Jim Collins and David Lee Murphy and recorded by American country music artist Jason Aldean. It was released in May 2009 as the second single from Aldean's 2009 album Wide Open and as the eighth single of his career. The song became the singer's third number one hit on the U.S. Billboard Hot Country Songs chart in September of that year.

== Content ==
The song is a mid-tempo where the narrator asks if his lover wants to go to town with him, or if she would rather ride with him "on [his] big green tractor".

David Lee Murphy told Engine 145 that the idea for the song came to him when he was out driving his own tractor: "The next day I was writing with Jim Collins, who had written 'She Thinks My Tractor's Sexy' for Kenny [Chesney]. I walked in there and asked him if he’d be willing to tackle another tractor song." Collins agreed, but he said that this song should take on a different direction than "She Thinks My Tractor's Sexy," which he called "tongue-in-cheek." Regarding his decision to record the song, Aldean said that Murphy is "a good friend and his style is a lot like mine, really uptempo, fun kinda stuff." Aldean said that he considered the song "romantic."

== Critical reception ==
The song has received mixed reviews from critics. Karlie Justus of Engine 145 gave the song a “thumbs-up”, describing it as “Aldean’s best song to date" and saying that it "delivers a catchy chorus with an authentic country feeling without blatantly pandering to stereotypical farm life", although she also said, "Despite its lackadaisical appeal and imminent commercial success, 'Big Green Tractor' will likely be largely forgotten in a year." Matt Bjorke of Roughstock gave the song a less favorable rating, saying that the tune was derivative of Jason Michael Carroll's "Livin' Our Love Song" and Craig Morgan's later releases for Broken Bow. He added, "So while 'Big Green Tractor' is likely to continue Jason Aldean's radio success, it isn't the kind of song that will inspire many fans to buy his Wide Open album."

== Music video ==
The music video for the song was released on July 25, 2009 and was directed by Ivan Dudynsky. It is footage of a live performance in February 2009 in Knoxville, Tennessee. It also uses an alternate live version of the song.

== Chart performance ==
The song debuted at number 48 on the U.S. Billboard Hot Country Songs chart in May 2009, and entered the Top 40 in its second chart week. It became Aldean's third number one on the chart week of September 5, 2009. It spent four weeks at number one, becoming the first song to spend that long at the top of the country charts since Brad Paisley's "Letter to Me" in February 2008. As a result, this ended an eighteen-month streak in which no songs had spent more than three weeks at number one. The song was also Aldean's highest-peaking single on the Billboard Hot 100 at number 18, until it was surpassed by his 2011 hit "Dirt Road Anthem".

On September 2, 2009, the song received a platinum certification from the Recording Industry Association of America (RIAA) for 1,000,000 registered downloads. It is Aldean's second single to earn this certification; three others were certified gold.

As of May, 2012, according to Roughstock digital sales reporting, "Big Green Tractor" has sold 2,028,000 downloads in the United States. As a ringtone, “Big Green Tractor” became a #1 ringtone in all genres in 2009 becoming the first Country ringtone to hold that distinction and logged more than one million downloads. It also had five consecutive weeks as the #1 most downloaded ringtone on Apple's iTunes in 2009.

Chart (2009)	Peak position
Canada Country (Billboard)	3
Canada Hot 100 (Billboard)	54
US Billboard Hot 100	18
US Hot Country Songs (Billboard)	1

=== Year-end charts ===
Chart (2009)	Position
U.S. Billboard Hot 100	75
US Country Songs (Billboard)	10

=== Certifications ===
Region	Certification	Certified units/sales
United States (RIAA)	3× Platinum	3,000,000^{‡}
United States (RIAA) Mastertone	Platinum	1,000,000^{*}
^{*} Sales figures based on certification alone.^{‡} Sales+streaming figures based on certification alone.
