= Johnny Cash (Tracy Byrd song) =

Single by Jason Aldean

from the album Relentless
- Released: February 5, 2007
- Recorded: 2006–07
- Genre: Country rock
- Length: 3:11
- Label: Broken Bow
- Songwriters: Rodney Clawson; Vicky McGehee; John Rich
- Producer: Michael Knox

Jason Aldean singles chronology
"Amarillo Sky" (2006)	"Johnny Cash" (2007)	"Laughed Until We Cried" (2007)

"Johnny Cash" is a song co-written by John Rich, Vicky McGehee, and Rodney Clawson. It was originally recorded by Tracy Byrd on his 2005 Greatest Hits album, but was not released as a single. The song was covered by American country music artist Jason Aldean, and his version was released as the first single from his 2007 album Relentless and the fourth single of his career. Aldean's version also became his fourth (consecutive) top 10 hit on the U.S. Billboard Hot Country Songs chart with a peak at number 6.

== Content ==
"Johnny Cash" is an up-tempo song in which the narrator addresses his lover, inviting her to join him on a road trip to Las Vegas. The connection to singer Johnny Cash is made only in the chorus ("Blastin' out the Johnny Cash"), indicating that Cash's music will be played while the narrator and his lover are on their road trip. The song also makes several references to a number of Cash's songs.

== Critical reception ==
Brody Vercher of Engine 145 said that the song is "a good pick-me-up song for those looking to get the blood flowing before a workout." Kevin John Coyne, reviewing the song for Country Universe, gave it a C− grade. He said that the song "doesn’t even have a melody, with Aldean yelling through most of the record as if he’s straining to be heard over the loud production."

== Music video ==
The music video takes place in places around Las Vegas, and features Jason Aldean and his band playing in a "famous" Las Vegas courtyard where many non-working neon signs and such are placed (this area has been used in several other country videos as well), as well as scenes of him and his lover driving around the adjacent desert roads during the day, and on the strip at night, ending with a shot of Jason kicking a footlight out in front of him, a reference to the famous Cash incident in which he did so at the Grand Ole Opry in the '60s. It is Jason's first video in which he is seen wearing a black cowboy hat, instead of his usual white one. The video was directed by Wes Edwards.

== In popular culture ==
The song was also featured in the soundtrack to the video game NASCAR 08.

== Chart performance ==
"Johnny Cash" debuted at number 44 on the U.S. Billboard Hot Country Songs chart for the week of February 17, 2007.

Chart (2007)	Peak position
Canada Country (Billboard)	25
US Billboard Hot 100	68
US Hot Country Songs (Billboard)	6

=== Year-end charts ===
Chart (2007)	Position
US Country Songs (Billboard)	38

== Certifications ==
Region	Certification	Certified units/sales
United States (RIAA)	Gold	500,000^{‡}
^{‡} Sales+streaming figures based on certification alone.
