= Relentless (Jason Aldean album) =

Studio album by Jason Aldean
- Released: May 29, 2007
- Recorded: 2007
- Genre: Country
- Length: 44:57
- Label: Broken Bow
- Producer: Michael Knox

Jason Aldean chronology
Jason Aldean (2005)	Relentless (2007)	Wide Open (2009)

Singles from Relentless
- 1. "Johnny Cash" Released: February 5, 2007; 2. "Laughed Until We Cried" Released: August 1, 2007; 3. "Relentless" Released: May 5, 2008

Professional ratings
Review scores
Source	Rating
Allmusic	3.5/5 stars
Entertainment Weekly	C
Country Standard Time	
Billboard	favorable

Relentless is the second studio album by American country music artist Jason Aldean. It was released on May 29, 2007 via Broken Bow Records. The album debuted at number 4 on the U.S. Billboard 200 and at number one on the Top Country Albums chart, selling about 98,000 copies in its first week. On October 4 of the same year, the album was certified gold by the RIAA. It was certified platinum in September 2012.

Relentless has produced three chart singles for Aldean on the Hot Country Songs charts. The lead-off single "Johnny Cash" (originally recorded by Tracy Byrd on his 2004 album Greatest Hits) and "Laughed Until We Cried" both reached No. 6 on that chart, and the title track reached No. 15 in late 2008. Thus, it is Aldean's only album to date to not produce a number one single.

== Critical reception ==
Ken Tucker of Billboard gave a positive review, saying that "every cut features full, guitar-driven production". He considered "Johnny Cash", "Back in This Cigarette" and "I Break Everything I Touch" standout tracks.

== Track listing ==
No.	Title	Writer(s)	Length
1.	"Johnny Cash"	Rodney Clawson; Vicky McGehee; John Rich	3:11
2.	"Laughed Until We Cried"	Ashley Gorley; Kelley Lovelace	3:23
3.	"Do You Wish It Was Me"	Julie Adkison; Clawson	4:25
4.	"I Use What I Got"	Jim Collins; Brett James	3:07
5.	"Who's Kissing You Tonight"	Rich; Tom Shapiro; Chris Waters	3:25
6.	"Relentless"	James LeBlanc; John Paul White	3:42
7.	"My Memory Ain't What It Used to Be"	Gorley; Wade Kirby; Bryan Simpson	4:14
8.	"No"	Collins; Tony Martin; Wendell Mobley	3:41
9.	"Back in this Cigarette"	Joe Doyle; Michael Mobley	4:35
10.	"Grown Woman" (duet with Miranda Lambert)	James; Hillary Lindsey	3:58
11.	"I Break Everything I Touch"	David Lee Murphy; Kim Tribble	3:20
12.	"Not Every Man Lives"	Lee Brice; Billy Montana; Frank J. Myers	3:56
Total length:			44:57

== Chart performance ==
=== Weekly charts ===
Chart (2007)	Peak position
US Billboard 200	4
US Top Country Albums (Billboard)	1
US Independent Albums (Billboard)	1

=== Year-end charts ===
Chart (2007)	Position
US Billboard 200	136
US Top Country Albums (Billboard)	26
Chart (2008)	Position
US Top Country Albums (Billboard)	33

=== Singles ===
Year	Single	Peak chart positions		
Year	Single	US Country	US	CAN
2007	"Johnny Cash"	6	68	—
2007	"Laughed Until We Cried"	6	61	88
2008	"Relentless"	15	103	—

== Certifications ==
Region	Certification	Certified units/sales
United States (RIAA)	Platinum	1,000,000^{^}
^{^} Shipments figures based on certification alone.

== Personnel ==
Musicians

- Jason Aldean – lead vocals
- Kurt Allison – electric guitar
- Tony Harrell – piano, B3 organ, Wurlitzer
- Wes Hightower – background vocals
- Michael Johnson – steel guitar
- Tully Kennedy – bass guitar
- Steve King – B3 organ on "Johnny Cash"
- Miranda Lambert – vocals on "Grown Woman"
- Liana Manis – background vocals
- Wendell Mobley – background vocals on "No"
- Mike Noble – acoustic guitar
- Danny Rader – acoustic guitar
- Rich Redmond – drums, percussion
- Adam Shoenfeld – electric guitar
- Jack Sizemore – electric guitar on "Johnny Cash"

Technical

- Michael Knox – production
- Peter Coleman – mixing, engineering
- Richard Dodd – mastering
- Neena Wright – production assistance
- Brandon Epps – engineering assistance
- Sam Martin – engineering assistance

Visuals

- Luellyn Latocki – art direction
- Ron Roark – art direction
- Kristin Barlowe – photography
- Marcus Melton – cover design
- Latocki Team Creative – graphic design
