= I May Hate Myself in the Morning =

Single by Lee Ann Womack

from the album There's More Where That Came From
- Released: October 25, 2004
- Genre: Country
- Length: 4:34
- Label: MCA Nashville
- Songwriter: Odie Blackmon
- Producer: Byron Gallimore

Lee Ann Womack singles chronology
"The Wrong Girl" (2004)	"I May Hate Myself in the Morning" (2004)	"He Oughta Know That by Now" (2005)

Music video
- "I May Hate Myself in the Morning" at CMT.com

"I May Hate Myself in the Morning" is a song written by Odie Blackmon, and recorded by American country music artist Lee Ann Womack. It was released in October 2004 as the lead-off single from her album There's More Where That Came From. The song was a Top 10 hit on both the U.S. and Canadian country charts.

== Background ==
Womack told Billboard, "Frank brought home 'I May Hate Myself in the Morning.' It was almost like the song said, 'Just go with me, this is the direction we need to go. With every record I usually will find one song as the anchor and build the record around it. That was the song for this record that I started with, and I [looked] for material that fit with that."

Womack told The Mirror, "This is the kind of stuff I grew up listening to. How true is this song? Even if you haven't been in that situation, we all know somebody who has. It's just honest." In an interview with The Mirror Womack said, "I was kind of languishing, not really sure what I wanted to do or what I needed to do. But then I heard I May Hate Myself in the Morning, and that was my answer. To put it in visual terms, it was like I had a big question mark over my head, and then all of the sudden, I had a big light bulb over my head. That song made me want to get back in the studio and make music again. I knew from the beginning that I wanted Hate Myself to be the first single. That song was not really like the other things that were happening on radio at the time, but at some point, you just have to stand up and say, 'This is who I am."

After winning the award for best single from the Country Music Association Womack said, "'If you are listening to music that doesn't touch you, music that doesn't mean anything to you, tune into your country station, because we have songs about your life, we have songs that you will love, we have songs that speak to your heart."

== Content ==
"I May Hate Myself in the Morning" is a ballad backed by acoustic guitar, with steel guitar and string fills. The narrator describes how she is aware of the consequences when she wakes up in the morning, but she is going to have a night of passion with a man anyway. He is an ex from her past from whom she can't seem to make a clean break.

Womack's ex-husband, Jason Sellers, provides backing vocals to the song.

== Critical reception ==
Kalefa Sannh of The New York Times wrote, "That refrain -- I may hate myself in the morning/But I'm gonna love you tonight -- already sounds like a classic couplet, and it also helps add some intriguing wrinkles to Ms. Womack's smooth persona; the lyrics imply, without quite saying so, that the lovers may have other commitments." Editors at Billboard wrote, "The title cut, with its weeping fiddle and soaring performance from Womack, is an instant entry into the country lexicon." Joey Guerra of the Houston Chronicle wrote, "First single I May Hate Myself in the Morning is a winning example of Womack's new outlook, melding her lilting vocal work with a comfortably lazy arrangement. It's a great moment." Sarah Rodman of the Boston Herald wrote, "The title track is a cheatin' ballad of the highest quality, conjuring equal measures of guilt and giddiness in the grooves."

== Music video ==
A music video was released for the song, directed by Trey Fanjoy. In the video, Womack is shown sitting in a bedroom by the window and lying on her bed, gazing off into the distance as she sings, mixed with scenes of her dancing in a pool hall with a man (Jack Ingram) and the same man sitting in a chair reading in a separate room. The cover for the album is shown close-up in several places of the video, including on a pay phone that Womack uses. A portion of the video was filmed in the Fort Worth Stockyards in Fort Worth, Texas.

The music video was ranked #38 on the 2008 version of CMT's 40 Sexiest Videos.

== Personnel ==
- Shannon Forrest – drums and percussion
- Larry Franklin – fiddle
- Paul Franklin – pedal steel guitar
- B. James Lowry – acoustic guitar
- Brent Mason – electric guitar
- Steve Nathan – electric piano
- Jason Sellers – backing vocals
- Lee Ann Womack – vocals
- Glenn Worf – bass

== Chart performance ==
"I May Hate Myself in the Morning" debuted at number 58 on the U.S. Billboard Hot Country Singles & Tracks for the week of October 23, 2004.

Chart (2004–2005)	Peak position
US Billboard Hot 100	66
US Hot Country Songs (Billboard)	10

=== Year-end charts ===
Chart (2005)	Position
US Country Songs (Billboard)	35
