= Relentless (Jason Aldean song) =

Single by Jason Aldean

from the album Relentless
- B-side: "Hicktown"
- Released: May 5, 2008
- Recorded: 2007
- Genre: Country
- Length: 3:42
- Label: Broken Bow
- Songwriters: James LeBlanc; John Paul White
- Producer: Michael Knox

Jason Aldean singles chronology
"Laughed Until We Cried" (2007)	"Relentless" (2008)	"She's Country" (2008)

"Relentless" is a song written by James LeBlanc and John Paul White and recorded by American country music artist Jason Aldean. It was released on May 5, 2008 as the third and final single from Aldean's 2007 album of the same name. The song peaked at number 15 on the U.S. Billboard Hot Country Songs in late 2008.

== Content ==
"Relentless" is a mid-tempo in which the narrator describes his lover as being "relentless" in nature ("I can't outrun it / Just keeps comin' / Girl, your love is relentless"). He compares her to a daydream, crashing waves, and a storm.

== Critical reception ==
Leeann Ward of Country Universe gave the song a B− grade. She described the verses as having "somewhat murky" lyrics, although she added that they "are liable to get stuck in your head."

== Music video ==
The music video was directed by Ryan Smith, and aired in June 2008. The video takes place at a motel with Jason Aldean and his band featured in the motel room in some scenes, and in some scenes, Jason Aldean and his band is performing on the parking lot.

== Chart performance ==
"Relentless" debuted at number 54 on the U.S. Billboard Hot Country Songs chart for the week of May 10, 2008. The song peaked at number 15 on the U.S. Billboard Hot Country Songs chart, becoming Aldean's first single to miss the Top 10. Also, it is his first to not enter the Billboard Hot 100, even though it did peak at number 3 on the Bubbling Under Hot 100 (equivalent to number 103 on the Hot 100).

Chart (2008)	Peak position
Canada Country (Billboard)	47
US Billboard Bubbling Under Hot 100	3
US Hot Country Songs (Billboard)	15
