= Laughed Until We Cried =

Single by Jason Aldean

from the album Relentless
- Released: August 1, 2007
- Recorded: 2007
- Genre: Country
- Length: 3:22
- Label: Broken Bow
- Songwriters: Ashley Gorley; Kelley Lovelace
- Producer: Michael Knox

Jason Aldean singles chronology
"Johnny Cash" (2007)	"Laughed Until We Cried" (2007)	"Relentless" (2008)

"Laughed Until We Cried" is a song written by Kelley Lovelace and Ashley Gorley and recorded by American country music artist Jason Aldean. It was released in August 2007 as the second single from Aldean's 2007 album Relentless. The song reached number 6 on the U.S. Billboard Hot Country Songs chart and peaked at number 61 on the Billboard Hot 100.

== Content ==
"Laughed Until We Cried" is a ballad in which the narrator reflects on various events in his life, each involving family and/or friends, such as having fun on a senior class trip, listening to his grandfather telling family stories at a Christmas gathering, and rocking a newborn baby daughter to sleep. In each case, the narrator describes the events as being a time when he and those around him "laughed until [they] cried".

== Critical reception ==
Brody Vercher, reviewing the album for Engine 145, said that "the [song’s] lyrics are decent, but the tired formula fails to tug at the listener’s heart strings." He then says that this might be because of Aldean's vocal performance. Kevin John Coyne of Country Universe gave the song a B+ grade, saying that Aldean's vocals are a little too processed, although he added that "other than that, this one is a keeper."

== Music video ==
The music video shows Jason Aldean walking along the beach, and then a boardwalk pier. It was filmed in Wildwood, NJ, and it features prominent landmarks known to those who have visited "The Wildwoods." Aldean's former wife Jessica and daughter Keeley also appear in the video. This music video was directed by Kristin Barlowe, unlike his first four videos, which were directed by Wes Edwards.

== Chart positions ==
"Laughed Until We Cried" debuted at #58 on the U.S. Billboard Hot Country Songs chart for the week of August 25, 2007.

Chart (2007–2008)	Peak position
Canada Country (Billboard)	6
Canada Hot 100 (Billboard)	88
US Billboard Hot 100	61
US Hot Country Songs (Billboard)	6

=== Year-end charts ===
Chart (2008)	Position
US Country Songs (Billboard)	35

== Certifications ==
Region	Certification	Certified units/sales
United States (RIAA)	Gold	500,000^{‡}
^{‡} Sales+streaming figures based on certification alone.
