= Trent Willmon =

American singer-songwriter (born 1973)

- Born: March 6, 1973 (age 53)
- Origin: Afton, Texas, United States
- Genres: Country
- Occupations: Singer-songwriter, record producer
- Instruments: Vocals, acoustic guitar
- Years active: 1998–present
- Labels: Columbia Nashville, Compadre
- Website: www.trentwillmon.com

Trent Willmon (born March 6, 1973) is an American country music artist, songwriter, and producer. Active since 1998 as a songwriter in Nashville, Tennessee, Willmon was signed to Columbia Records in 2004. He released two albums for the label (2004's Trent Willmon and 2006's A Little More Livin') and charted six singles on the U.S. Billboard Hot Country Songs charts before exiting Columbia in 2006. A third album, Broken In, was released on the independent Compadre label in February 2008.

== Musical career ==
Willmon was born in Amarillo, Texas and was raised on a ranch near Afton, Texas. After 2 years at South Plains College as an Animal Science major, he left to pursue music, playing with several Texas- based bands, including playing bass for bluegrass legend Karl Shiflett. In 1999 he signed a staff writing deal with SeaGayle Music. One of his first cuts as a songwriter was "It Doesn't Mean I Don't Love You", which he co-wrote with Bobby Pinson and Jeremy Spillman. It was recorded by the duo McHayes (which comprised 1990s country singer Wade Hayes and fiddler Mark McClurg), and reached 41 on the country charts in 2003.

Willmon signed with Columbia Records in 2004. His self-titled debut album was released that year, and it produced four singles. The first of these was "Beer Man", which peaked at 30 on the country charts. Following it were "Dixie Rose Deluxe's Honky-Tonk, Feed Store, Gun Shop, Used Car, Beer, Bait, BBQ, Barber Shop, Laundromat" at 36, "Home Sweet Holiday Inn" at 49, and finally "The Good Life" at 38. A second album, A Little More Livin', followed in 2006. Although its lead-off single "On Again Tonight" became his highest chart entry at 27, the follow-up "So Am I" peaked at 59, and Willmon exited Columbia's roster.

Willmon signed with Compadre Records in 2007. His third album, Broken In, was released on February 26, 2008. The album produced three singles in "There Is a God", the title track, and "Cold Beer and a Fishing Pole", though none of these entered the charts. In early 2008, he also made his acting debut in the film Palo Pinto Gold, a cowboy film also starring Roy Clark and Mel Tillis. Willmon also co-wrote Montgomery Gentry's 2009 single "Back When I Knew It All" and Steel Magnolia's 2010 single "Keep On Lovin' You".

== Discography ==
=== Studio albums ===
List of studio albums, with selected details and peak chart positions
Title	Details	Peak chart positions			
Title	Details	US Country	US	US Heat.	US Indie
Trent Willmon	Release date: October 12, 2004; Label: Columbia Nashville	22	150	5	—
A Little More Livin'	Release date: June 13, 2006; Label: Columbia Nashville	19	70	—	—
Broken In	Release date: February 26, 2008; Label: Compadre Records	33	—	7	30
Little Ol' Cafe	Release date: October 6, 2010; Label: Feed Store Records	—	—	—	—
"—" denotes releases that did not chart

=== Singles ===
List of singles, with selected peak chart positions
Year	Single	Chart positions		Album
Year	Single	US Country	US Bubbling	Album
2004	"Beer Man"	30	—	Trent Willmon
2004	"Dixie Rose Deluxe's Honky-Tonk, Feed Store, Gun Shop, Used Car, Beer, Bait, BBQ, Barber Shop, Laundromat"	36	—	Trent Willmon
2005	"Home Sweet Holiday Inn"	49	—	Trent Willmon
2005	"The Good Life"	38	—	Trent Willmon
2006	"On Again Tonight"	27	24	A Little More Livin'
2006	"So Am I"	59	—	A Little More Livin'
2007	"There Is a God"	—	—	Broken In
2008	"Broken In"	—	—	Broken In
2008	"Cold Beer and a Fishin' Pole"	—	—	Broken In

=== Music videos ===
List of music videos
Year	Video	Director
2004	"Beer Man"	Brent Hedgecock
2004	"Dixie Rose Deluxe's…"	Traci Goudie
2005	"Home Sweet Holiday Inn"	Deb Haus
2006	"On Again Tonight"	Sam Erickson
2007	"There Is a God"	Andy Wehrspan
2008	"Broken In"	The Brads
2009	"Live from Gilley's"	Texas Roadhouse Live
