= Tracy Lawrence discography =

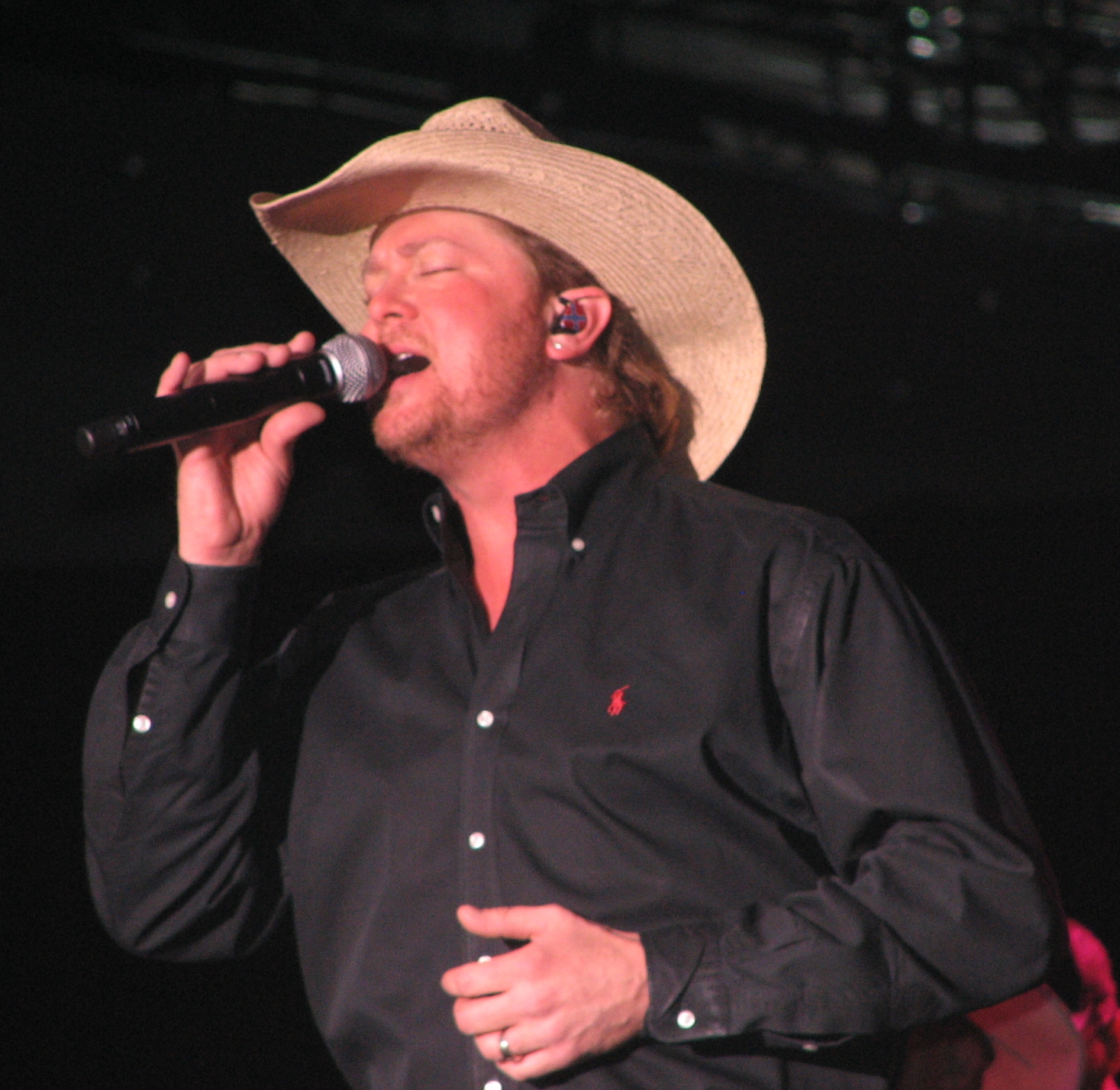
- Studio albums: 14
- Extended plays: 1
- Live albums: 1
- Compilation albums: 8
- Singles: 46
- Music videos: 33
- Other charted songs: 1
- No. 1 singles: 9

Tracy Lawrence is an American country music singer. His discography comprises fourteen studio albums, one extended play, one live album, eight compilation albums, one box set, and 46 singles. Of his albums, the highest-certified are 1993's Alibis and 1996's Time Marches On, each certified 2× platinum by the Recording Industry Association of America (RIAA).

Lawrence made his debut in late 1991 on Atlantic Records with the single "Sticks and Stones", which topped the Billboard charts in January 1992. Following this song came several more top ten country hits, including four straight number ones from Alibis, and one each from I See It Now and Time Marches On. The title track of the latter album is also his longest-lasting number one, at three weeks. His chart success waned in 1997 when "The Coast Is Clear" stalled at number 26 on the country charts, and he did not return to the top 40 again until late 1999–early 2000 with "Lessons Learned", the title track to his final Atlantic album. A largely unsuccessful self-titled album was released in 2001 via Warner Bros. Records Nashville after Atlantic closed its country division, followed by 2004's Strong on the DreamWorks Records label, which produced the number 4 "Paint Me a Birmingham".

After a greatest-hits package on Mercury Records, Lawrence founded his own label, Rocky Comfort Records. The label's first release, "Find Out Who Your Friends Are", became his eighth U.S. number one, as well as the slowest-climbing country number one in the history of the Billboard charts. The album's other singles, however, failed to match the success of the lead-off single.

== Studio albums ==
=== 1990s ===
Title	Album details	Peak chart positions			Certifications (sales threshold)
Title	Album details	US Country	US	CAN Country	Certifications (sales threshold)
Sticks and Stones	Release date: November 12, 1991; Label: Atlantic Records	10	71	7	CAN: Gold; US: Platinum
Alibis	Release date: March 9, 1993; Label: Atlantic Records	5	25	5	CAN: Gold; US: 2× Platinum
I See It Now	Release date: September 20, 1994; Label: Atlantic Records	3	28	—	CAN: Gold; US: Platinum
Time Marches On	Release date: January 23, 1996; Label: Atlantic Records	4	25	4	US: 2× Platinum
The Coast Is Clear	Release date: March 18, 1997; Label: Atlantic Records	4	45	6	US: Gold
"—" denotes releases that did not chart

=== 2000s ===
Title	Album details	Peak chart positions			
Title	Album details	US Country	US	US Christ	US Indie
Lessons Learned (Note: Lessons Learned also peaked at number 37 on the Canadian RPM Country Albums/CDs chart.)	Release date: February 1, 2000; Label: Atlantic Records	9	69	—	—
Tracy Lawrence	Release date: October 23, 2001; Label: Warner Bros. Nashville	13	136	—	—
Strong	Release date: March 30, 2004; Label: DreamWorks Nashville	2	17	—	—
For the Love	Release date: January 30, 2007; Label: Rocky Comfort/CO5	6	53	—	3
The Rock	Release date: June 9, 2009; Label: Rocky Comfort/CO5	20	104	4	19
"—" denotes releases that did not chart

=== 2010s and 2020s ===
Title	Album details	Peak chart positions			Sales
Title	Album details	US Country	US	US Indie	Sales
The Singer	Release date: June 7, 2011; Label: Lawrence Music Group	—	—	—	
Headlights, Taillights and Radios	Release date: August 20, 2013; Label: Lawrence Music Group	26	124	28	
Good Ole Days	Release date: November 10, 2017; Label: Lawrence Music Group	16	87	6	US: 8,200
Made in America	Release date: August 16, 2019; Label: Lawrence Music Group	—	—	18	US: 6,500
Hindsight 2020 Volume 1: Stairway to Heaven Highway to Hell	Release date: April 23, 2021; Label: Lawrence Music Group	—	—	—	
Hindsight 2020 Volume 2: Price of Fame	Release date: August 13, 2021; Label: Lawrence Music Group	—	—	—	
Hindsight 2020 Volume 3: Angelina	Release date: January 28, 2022; Label: Lawrence Music Group	—	—	—	
"—" denotes releases that did not chart

== Extended plays ==
Title	Album details
Out Here in It	Release date: June 7, 2024; Label: Lawrence Music Group

== Compilation albums ==
Title	Album details	Peak chart positions			Certifications (sales threshold)
Title	Album details	US Country	US	CAN Country	Certifications (sales threshold)
The Best of Tracy Lawrence	Release date: September 1, 1998; Label: Atlantic Records; Formats: CD, cassette	13	92	12	US: Gold
Country Classics	Release date: October 4, 2005; Label: Rhino Entertainment; Formats: CD, music download	—	—	—	
Then & Now: The Hits Collection	Release date: October 18, 2005; Label: Mercury Nashville; Formats: CD, music download	8	35	—	
Rhino Hi-Five: Tracy Lawrence	Release date: September 26, 2006; Label: Rhino Entertainment; Formats: music download	—	—	—	
The Very Best of Tracy Lawrence	Release date: July 10, 2007; Label: Rhino Entertainment; Formats: CD, music download	29	163	—	
If the World Had a Front Porch	Release date: 2012; Label: Rhino Entertainment/Cracker Barrel; Formats: CD, music download	—	—	—	
Greatest Hits: Evolution	Release date: December 2, 2014; Label: Lawrence Music Group; Formats: CD, music download	—	—	—	
Texas Tornado	Release date: July 12, 2019; Label: Warner Music Group; Formats: music download	—	—	—	
"—" denotes releases that did not chart

== Live albums ==
Title	Album details	Peak chart positions		
Title	Album details	US Country	US	CAN Country
Tracy Lawrence Live	Release date: September 19, 1995; Label: Atlantic Records; Formats: CD, cassette	24	151	10

== Holiday albums ==
Title	Album details
All Wrapped Up in Christmas	Release date: October 23, 2007; Label: Rocky Comfort/CO5; Formats: CD, music download
Frozen in Time	Release date: October 12, 2018; Label: Lawrence Music Group; Formats: CD, music download

== Box sets ==
Title	Album details
The Complete Albums 1991-2001	Release date: October 25, 2019; Label: Warner Music Group; Formats: music download

== Singles ==
=== 1991–2000 ===
Year	Single	Peak chart positions			Album
Year	Single	US Country	US	CAN Country	Album
1991	"Sticks and Stones"	1	—	1	Sticks and Stones
1992	"Today's Lonely Fool"	3	—	2	Sticks and Stones
1992	"Runnin' Behind"	4	—	6	Sticks and Stones
1992	"Somebody Paints the Wall"	8	—	19	Sticks and Stones
1993	"Alibis"	1	72	1	Alibis
1993	"Can't Break It to My Heart"	1	—	2	Alibis
1993	"My Second Home"	1	—	6	Alibis
1994	"If the Good Die Young"	1	—	1	Alibis
1994	"Renegades, Rebels and Rogues"	7	—	5	Maverick (soundtrack)
1994	"I See It Now"	2	84	5	I See It Now
1994	"As Any Fool Can See"	2	—	18	I See It Now
1995	"Texas Tornado"	1	—	1	I See It Now
1995	"If the World Had a Front Porch"	2	—	7	I See It Now
1995	"If You Loved Me"	4	—	4	Time Marches On
1996	"Time Marches On"	1	—	1	Time Marches On
1996	"Stars over Texas"	2	—	42	Time Marches On
1996	"Is That a Tear"	2	— (Note: "Is That a Tear" did not enter the Billboard Hot 100, but peaked at number 4 on Bubbling Under Hot 100 Singles, which acts as a 25-song extension of the Hot 100.)	1	Time Marches On
1997	"Better Man, Better Off"	2	— (Note: "Better Man, Better Off" did not enter the Billboard Hot 100, but peaked at number 8 on Bubbling Under Hot 100 Singles, which acts as a 25-song extension of the Hot 100.)	3	The Coast Is Clear
1997	"How a Cowgirl Says Goodbye"	4	—	5	The Coast Is Clear
1997	"The Coast Is Clear"	26	—	45	The Coast Is Clear
1998	"While You Sleep"	46	—	51	The Coast Is Clear
1998	"I'll Never Pass This Way Again"	—	—	—	The Civil War: The Nashville Sessions
1999	"Lessons Learned"	3	40	3	Lessons Learned
2000	"Lonely"	18	— (Note: "Lonely" did not enter the Billboard Hot 100, but peaked at number 6 on Bubbling Under Hot 100 Singles, which acts as a 25-song extension of the Hot 100.)	24	Lessons Learned
"—" denotes releases that did not chart

=== 2001–2010 ===
Year	Single	Peak chart positions			Album
Year	Single	US Country	US	CAN	Album
2001	"Unforgiven"	35	—	—	Lessons Learned
2001	"Life Don't Have to Be So Hard"	36	—	—	Tracy Lawrence
2002	"What a Memory"	53	—	—	Tracy Lawrence
2003	"Paint Me a Birmingham"	4	42	—	Strong
2004	"It's All How You Look at It"	36	—	—	Strong
2004	"Sawdust on Her Halo"	46	—	—	Strong
2005	"Used to the Pain"	35	—	—	Then & Now: The Hits Collection
2006	"If I Don't Make It Back"	42	—	—	Then & Now: The Hits Collection
2006	"Find Out Who Your Friends Are" (featuring Tim McGraw and Kenny Chesney; uncredited)	1	61	69	For the Love
2007	"Til I Was a Daddy Too"	59	—	—	For the Love
2008	"Til I Was a Daddy Too" (re-release)	32	—	—	For the Love
2008	"You Can't Hide Redneck"	56	—	—	For the Love
2009	"Up to Him"	47	—	—	The Rock
"—" denotes releases that did not chart

=== 2011–present ===
Year	Single	Album
2012	"Pills"	The Singer
2012	"Saturday in the South"	—N/a
2012	"Stop Drop and Roll"	Headlights, Taillights and Radios
2013	"Footprints on the Moon"	Headlights, Taillights and Radios
2014	"Lie"	Headlights, Taillights and Radios
2014	"Blacktop"	Headlights, Taillights and Radios
2019	"Made in America"	Made in America
2021	"Stairway to Heaven Highway to Hell"	Hindsight 2020
2024	"Out Here In it"	Out Here In It EP

== Other singles ==
=== Other charted songs ===
Year	Single	Peak positions	Album
Year	Single	US Country	Album
2008	"All Wrapped Up in Christmas"	57	All Wrapped Up in Christmas

=== Featured singles ===
Year	Single	Artist	Peak positions	Album
Year	Single	Artist	US Country	Album
1996	"Hope"	Hope: Country Music's Quest for a Cure (Note: "Hope" was a charity single for the T. J. Martell Foundation for cancer research. It featured vocals from John Berry, Terri Clark, Vince Gill, Faith Hill, Lawrence, Little Texas, Neal McCoy, Tim McGraw, Lorrie Morgan, Marty Stuart, Travis Tritt, and Trisha Yearwood.)	57	—N/a

== Videography ==
=== Music videos ===
Year	Title	Director
1991	"Sticks and Stones"	Richard Jernigan
1992	"Today's Lonely Fool"	Marc Ball
1992	"Runnin' Behind"	Marc Ball
1993	"Alibis"	Marc Ball
1993	"Can't Break It to My Heart"	Marc Ball
1993	"My Second Home"	Marc Ball
1994	"If the Good Die Young"	Marc Ball
1994	"Renegades, Rebels and Rogues"	Marc Ball
1994	"I See It Now"	Marc Ball
1995	"As Any Fool Can See"	Marc Ball
1995	"Texas Tornado"	Marc Ball
1995	"If the World Had a Front Porch"	Marc Ball
1995	"If You Loved Me"	Marc Ball
1996	"Time Marches On"	Marc Ball
1996	"Stars over Texas"	Marc Ball
1996	"Is That a Tear"	Marc Ball
1997	"Better Man, Better Off"	Michael Merriman
1997	"How a Cowgirl Says Goodbye"	Michael Merriman
1997	"One Step Ahead of the Storm"	Marc Ball
1998	"While You Sleep"	Michael Merriman
1999	"I'll Never Pass This Way Again"	Marc Ball
1999	"Lessons Learned"	Jim Shea
2001	"Life Don't Have to Be So Hard"	Marc Ball
2004	"Paint Me a Birmingham"	
2004	"It's All How You Look at It"	Trey Fanjoy
2007	"Find Out Who Your Friends Are"	Flick Wiltshire
2007	"Til I Was a Daddy Too"	Eric Welch
2007	"All Wrapped Up in Christmas"	
2009	"Up to Him"	Flick Wiltshire
2013	"Stop, Drop and Roll"	
2014	"Lie"	Stokes Neilson
2018	"Good Ole Days" (with Big & Rich & Brad Arnold)	Shaun Silva
2018	"Frozen in Time"	Jon Small

=== Guest appearances ===
Year	Video	Director
1992	"I Don't Need Your Rockin' Chair" (George Jones & Friends)	Marc Ball
1994	"Amazing Grace" (The Maverick Choir)	Gil Bettman
1996	"Hope" (Various)	Frank W. Ockenfels III

== Miscellaneous appearances ==
Year	Song	Album
1994	"I'm Over You"	Keith Whitley: A Tribute Album
1996	"One Foot on the Pedal"	NASCAR: Hotter Than Asphalt
1997	"From Hillbilly Heaven to Honky Tonk Hell" (with Kenny Chesney and George Jones)	I Will Stand (Kenny Chesney album)
1997	"Paint It, Black"	Stone Country: Country Artists Perform the songs of The Rolling Stones
2009	"After the Fire Is Gone" (with Lorrie Morgan)	A Moment in Time (Lorrie Morgan album)
