= Tracy Lawrence Live =

Live album by Tracy Lawrence
- Released: September 19, 1995
- Recorded: 1995
- Genre: Country
- Length: 38:13
- Label: Atlantic
- Producer: Flip Anderson; James Stroud; Tracy Lawrence

Tracy Lawrence chronology
I See It Now (1994)	Tracy Lawrence Live (1995)	Time Marches On (1996)

Tracy Lawrence Live (originally titled Tracy Lawrence Live and Unplugged ) is an album released in 1995 by American country music singer Tracy Lawrence. His first live compilation, it features various live recordings of the hit singles from his first three studio albums (1991's Sticks and Stones, 1993's Alibis and 1994's I See It Now). Of the ten songs included here, all but "I Threw the Rest Away" were hugely successful singles for Lawrence.

== History ==
Lawrence compiled the album through a makeshift studio on his tour bus, choosing from over 40 recordings made in the six months prior to the album's completion. He co-produced with Flip Anderson, a member of his road band.

== Critical reception ==
Country Standard Time reviewer George Hauenstein gave the album a positive review, writing that "Lawrence is one of the best, most popular artist on the scene today, known for his very likeable, high energy stage shows. His legion of fans will no doubt be pleased with Live, which is essentially a greatest hits collection."

== Track listing ==
1. "Renegades, Rebels, and Rogues" (Larry Boone, Paul Nelson, Earl Clark) - 2:57
2. "Runnin' Behind" (Mark D. Sanders, Ed Hill) - 3:40
3. "Somebody Paints the Wall" (Tommy Smith, Charles Browder, Elroy Kahanek, Nelson Larkin) - 3:20
4. "I See It Now" (Boone, P. Nelson, Woody Lee) - 3:35
5. "Today's Lonely Fool" (Kenny Beard, Stan Paul Davis) - 4:05
6. "I Threw the Rest Away" (Gene Nelson, P. Nelson) - 3:59
7. "Sticks and Stones" (Roger Dillon, Elbert West) - 3:40
8. "Alibis" (Randy Boudreaux) - 3:31
9. "Can't Break It to My Heart" (Tracy Lawrence, Kirk Roth, Clark, West) - 5:17
10. "If the Good Die Young" (P. Nelson, Craig Wiseman) - 4:09

== Personnel ==
=== Members of Tracy Lawrence's band "Little Elvis" ===
- Flip Anderson - acoustic guitar, piano, keyboards, background vocals
- Tom Baughman - acoustic guitar, steel guitar
- Kenny Beard - acoustic guitar, background vocals
- Butch Davis - electric guitar, acoustic slide guitar
- Deryl Dodd - acoustic guitar, background vocals
- Tracy Lawrence - lead vocals
- Ward Stout - fiddle
- Alex Torrez - drums
- Leon Watson - bass guitar, background vocals

=== Additional musicians ===
- Hank Singer - fiddle

== Chart performance ==
Chart (1995)	Peak position
U.S. Billboard Top Country Albums	24
U.S. Billboard 200	151
Canadian RPM Country Albums	10
