= The Very Best of Tracy Lawrence =

Greatest hits album by Tracy Lawrence
- Released: July 10, 2007
- Recorded: 1991–2004
- Genre: Country
- Length: 67:40
- Label: Rhino
- Producer: Various

Tracy Lawrence chronology
For the Love (2007)	The Very Best of Tracy Lawrence (2007)	All Wrapped Up in Christmas (2007)

Professional ratings
Review scores
Source	Rating
Allmusic	4.5/5 stars

The Very Best of Tracy Lawrence is a 2007 compilation album by country music artist Tracy Lawrence. It is his third greatest-hits album. This compilation comprises 21 of his top ten singles, arranged in chronological order, from his 1991 debut "Sticks and Stones" to 2003's "Paint Me a Birmingham". Of the songs on this album, only the 1994 single "Renegades, Rebels and Rogues" (from the soundtrack to the 1994 film Maverick) was not previously included on one of Lawrence's studio releases. The album has sold 348,900 copies in the United States as of April 2017.

== Track listing ==
1. "Sticks and Stones" (Roger Dillon, Elbert West) - 3:36
2. "Today's Lonely Fool" (Kenny Beard, Stan Paul Davis) - 3:49
3. "Runnin' Behind" (Mark D. Sanders, Ed Hill) - 2:53
4. "Somebody Paints the Wall" (Tommy Smith, Charles Browder, Elroy Kahanek, Nelson Larkin) - 3:15
5. "Alibis" (Randy Boudreaux) - 3:02
6. "Can't Break It to My Heart" (Tracy Lawrence, Kirk Roth, Earl Clark, West) - 2:54
7. "My Second Home" (Lawrence, Paul Nelson, Kenny Beard) - 2:45
8. "If the Good Die Young" (Nelson, Craig Wiseman) - 2:27
9. "Renegades, Rebels and Rogues" (Larry Boone, Nelson, Clark) - 2:37
10. "I See It Now" (Boone, Nelson, Woody Lee) - 3:36
11. "As Any Fool Can See" (Nelson, Beard) - 3:03
12. "Texas Tornado" (Bobby Braddock) - 3:30
13. "If the World Had a Front Porch" (Lawrence, Nelson, Beard) - 3:05
14. "If You Loved Me" (Nelson, Tom Shapiro) - 3:21
15. "Time Marches On" (Braddock) - 3:03
16. "Stars over Texas" (Lawrence, Nelson, Beard) - 3:34
17. "Is That a Tear" (Beard, John Jarrard) - 3:18
18. "Better Man, Better Off" (Davis, Brett Jones) - 3:36
19. "How a Cowgirl Says Goodbye" (Lawrence, Nelson, Boone) - 3:30
20. "Lessons Learned" (Lawrence, Nelson, Boone) - 2:57
21. "Paint Me a Birmingham" (Buck Moore, Gary Duffy) - 3:48

== Personnel ==
- Flip Anderson – piano
- Eddie Bayers – drums, percussion
- Bruce Bouton – steel guitar
- Dennis Burnside – Hammond organ, piano
- Larry Byrom – acoustic guitar
- Mark Casstevens – acoustic guitar, harmonica, hi-string guitar
- Deryl Dodd – background vocals
- Dan Dugmore – steel guitar
- Shannon Forrest – drums
- Paul Franklin – Dobro, steel guitar, pedabro
- Sonny Garrish – dobro, steel guitar
- Jack Gavin – drums
- Rob Hajacos – fiddle, "assorted hoedown tools"
- Tony Harrell – keyboards, piano
- Aubrey Haynie – fiddle, mandolin
- Rick Huckaby – acoustic guitar, background vocals
- Dann Huff – electric guitar
- Tracy Lawrence – lead vocals
- Chris Leuzinger – electric guitar
- B. James Lowry – acoustic guitar
- Gary Lunn – bass guitar
- Terry McMillan – harmonica, percussion
- Liana Manis – background vocals
- Brent Mason – acoustic guitar, electric guitar, gut string guitar
- Steve Nathan – keyboards, piano
- Dave Pomeroy – bass guitar
- Brent Rowan – acoustic guitar, electric guitar, mandolin, soloist
- John Wesley Ryles – background vocals
- Hank Singer – fiddle
- Milton Sledge – drums
- Gary Smith – keyboards, piano, synthesizer
- Joe Spivey – fiddle, Archguitar
- James Stroud – drums, percussion
- Biff Watson – acoustic guitar
- Dennis Wilson – background vocals
- Lonnie Wilson – drums, percussion
- Glenn Worf – bass guitar
- Curtis Wright – background vocals
- Curtis Young – background vocals

== Charts ==
Chart (2007)	Peak position
U.S. Billboard 200	163
U.S. Billboard Top Country Albums	29
