= Then & Now: The Hits Collection =

Greatest hits album by Tracy Lawrence
- Released: October 18, 2005
- Genre: Country
- Length: 57:37
- Label: Mercury
- Producers: Tracy Lawrence; James Stroud

Tracy Lawrence chronology
Strong (2004)	Then & Now: The Hits Collection (2005)	For the Love (2007)

Singles from Then & Now: The Hits Collection
- 1. "Used to the Pain" Released: June 14, 2005; 2. "If I Don't Make It Back" Released: November 7, 2005

Professional ratings
Review scores
Source	Rating
Allmusic	4/5 stars

Then & Now: The Hits Collection is the second compilation album by American country music artist Tracy Lawrence. It is composed several hits from his previous albums, as well as the newly recorded tracks "Used to the Pain" and "If I Don't Make It Back". Both of these were released as singles, peaking at numbers 35 and 42, respectively, on the country charts.

== Content ==
"Used to the Pain" was previously released by its co-writer, Mark Nesler, on his 1998 debut album I'm Just That Way, and it was a number 45 single for him that year. Bobby Pinson, who co-wrote "If I Don't Make It Back", later recorded it on his 2007 album Songs for Somebody.

Lawrence re-recorded all of the previously released material for this album (except for "Paint Me a Birmingham") because Mercury Nashville Records, the label to which he was signed at the time, did not own the rights to his older material for Atlantic Records. This album is also his only release for Mercury.

== Track listing ==
No.	Title	Writer(s)	Length
1.	"Used to the Pain"	Mark Nesler, Tony Martin^{A}	3:14
2.	"Paint Me a Birmingham"	Buck Moore, Gary Duffy	3:49
3.	"If I Don't Make It Back"	Brett Jones, Bobby Pinson^{A}	4:04
4.	"If the World Had a Front Porch"	Tracy Lawrence, Paul Nelson, Kenny Beard	3:05
5.	"Sticks and Stones"	Elbert West, Roger Dillon	3:39
6.	"Is That a Tear"	John Jarrard, Beard	3:21
7.	"Time Marches On"	Bobby Braddock	3:07
8.	"I See It Now"	Nelson, Larry Boone, Woody Lee	3:37
9.	"How a Cowgirl Says Goodbye"	Boone, Nelson, Lawrence	3:35
10.	"Alibis"	Randy Boudreaux	3:07
11.	"Today's Lonely Fool"	Beard, Stan Paul Davis	3:53
12.	"Can't Break It to My Heart"	Kirk Roth, Lawrence, Earl Clark, West	3:40
13.	"Lessons Learned"	Lawrence, Nelson, Boone	3:00
14.	"Texas Tornado"	Braddock	3:33
15.	"Stars over Texas"	Boone, Lawrence, Nelson	3:37
16.	"My Second Home"	Lawrence, Beard, Nelson	2:47
17.	"If the Good Die Young"	Nelson, Craig Wiseman	2:29

^{A}Previously unreleased track.

== Personnel ==
- Eddie Bayers – drums
- Mike Brignardello – bass guitar
- Mark Casstevens – harmonica
- Dan Dugmore – steel guitar, Dobro
- Paul Franklin – steel guitar, Dobro
- Aubrey Haynie – fiddle, mandolin
- Tony Harrell – piano, keyboards
- Wes Hightower – background vocals
- Tracy Lawrence – lead vocals
- B. James Lowry – acoustic guitar
- Liana Manis – background vocals
- Brent Mason – electric guitar
- Steve Nathan – piano, keyboards
- John Wesley Ryles – background vocals
- Glenn Worf – bass guitar
- Curtis Wright – background vocals
- Curtis Young – background vocals

== Charts ==
=== Weekly charts ===
Chart (2005)	Peak position
US Billboard 200	35
US Top Country Albums (Billboard)	8

=== Year-end charts ===
Chart (2006)	Position
US Top Country Albums (Billboard)	73
