= The Best of Tracy Lawrence =

Greatest hits album by Tracy Lawrence
- Released: September 1, 1998
- Genre: Country
- Length: 44:23
- Label: Atlantic
- Producer: Various

Tracy Lawrence chronology
The Coast Is Clear (1997)	The Best of Tracy Lawrence (1998)	Lessons Learned (2000)

Professional ratings
Review scores
Source	Rating
Allmusic	4/5 stars

The Best of Tracy Lawrence is the first compilation album by American country music artist Tracy Lawrence. It is a compilation of songs previously released on his first four studio albums. The new track "Her Old Stompin' Ground" was not previously included on any of his albums.

== Track listing ==
No.	Title	Writer(s)	Length
1.	"Time Marches On"	Bobby Braddock	3:03
2.	"If the World Had a Front Porch"	Tracy Lawrence, Paul Nelson, Kenny Beard	3:05
3.	"Texas Tornado"	Braddock	3:30
4.	"Stars over Texas"	Larry Boone, Lawrence, Nelson	3:33
5.	"Her Old Stompin' Ground"	Nelson, Beard	3:13
6.	"Sticks and Stones"	Roger Dillon, Elbert West	3:32
7.	"While You Sleep"	Boone, Lawrence, Nelson	2:59
8.	"Renegades, Rebels and Rogues"	Boone, Nelson, Earl Clark	2:36
9.	"I See It Now"	Boone, Nelson, Woody Lee	3:37
10.	"Can't Break It to My Heart"	Lawrence, Kirk Roth, Clark	2:53
11.	"Alibis"	Randy Boudreaux	3:03
12.	"If the Good Die Young"	Nelson, Craig Wiseman	2:26
13.	"Is That a Tear"	John Jarrard, Beard	3:18
14.	"Better Man, Better Off"	Stan Paul Davis, Brett Jones	3:35

== Personnel ==
- Flip Anderson - piano
- Eddie Bayers - drums
- Bruce Bouton - steel guitar
- Dennis Burnside - Hammond organ, piano
- Larry Byrom - acoustic guitar
- Mark Casstevens - acoustic guitar, harmonica
- Deryl Dodd - background vocals
- Paul Franklin - Dobro, steel guitar, pedabro
- Sonny Garrish - steel guitar
- Rob Hajacos - fiddle
- Tony Harrell - keyboards, piano
- Dann Huff - electric guitar
- Tracy Lawrence - lead vocals
- Chris Leuzinger - electric guitar
- Terry McMillan - harmonica, percussion
- Liana Manis - background vocals
- Brent Mason - electric guitar
- Steve Nathan - keyboards, piano
- Dave Pomeroy - bass guitar
- Brent Rowan - electric guitar, mandolin
- John Wesley Ryles - background vocals
- Hank Singer - fiddle
- Milton Sledge - drums
- Gary Smith - keyboards, piano, synthesizer
- Joe Spivey - fiddle, acoustic guitar
- James Stroud - drums, percussion
- Willie Weeks - bass guitar
- Dennis Wilson - background vocals
- Lonnie Wilson - drums
- Glenn Worf - bass guitar
- Curtis Wright - background vocals
- Curtis Young - background vocals

== Chart performance ==
Chart (1998)	Peak position
U.S. Billboard Top Country Albums	13
U.S. Billboard 200	92
Canadian RPM Country Albums	12
