= Sticks and Stones (Tracy Lawrence album) =

Studio album by Tracy Lawrence
- Released: 1991
- Recorded: May 31, 1991
- Studio: Eleven, Eleven Sound, and Studio 6, Nashville, TN
- Genre: Country
- Length: 32:47
- Label: Atlantic
- Producer: James Stroud

Tracy Lawrence chronology
| Sticks and Stones (1991) | Alibis (1993) |

Singles from Sticks and Stones
- 1. "Sticks and Stones" Released: October 15, 1991; 2. "Today's Lonely Fool" Released: February 3, 1992; 3. "Runnin' Behind" Released: June 8, 1992; 4. "Somebody Paints the Wall" Released: September 28, 1992

Professional ratings
Review scores
| Source | Rating |
|---|---|
| AllMusic | 3/5 stars |
| Entertainment Weekly | A− |

Sticks and Stones is the debut studio album by American country music artist Tracy Lawrence. It was released in 1991 by Atlantic Records. It produced four singles: the title track, "Today's Lonely Fool", "Runnin' Behind", and "Somebody Paints the Wall", which peaked at Nos. 1, 3, 4, and 8, respectively, on the Billboard Hot Country Singles & Tracks (later Hot Country Songs) charts between 1991 and 1993.

The track "Paris, Tennessee" was later recorded by Dennis Robbins (one of the co-writers) on his 1992 album Man with a Plan and by Kenny Chesney on his 1995 album All I Need to Know. "Somebody Paints the Wall" was previously recorded by Josh Logan on his 1988 album of the same name, from which it was released as a single that year.

== Track listing ==
| No. | Title | Writer(s) | Length |
|---|---|---|---|
| 1. | "Runnin' Behind" | Mark D. Sanders, Ed Hill | 2:54 |
| 2. | "Sticks and Stones" | Roger Dillon, Elbert West | 3:36 |
| 3. | "Somebody Paints the Wall" | Tommy Smith, Charles Browder, Elroy Kahanek, Nelson Larkin | 3:18 |
| 4. | "Dancin' to Sweet 17" | Tracy Lawrence | 3:17 |
| 5. | "Today's Lonely Fool" | Kenny Beard, Stan Paul Davis | 3:50 |
| 6. | "Paris, Tennessee" | Dennis Robbins, Bob DiPiero, John Scott Sherrill | 2:24 |
| 7. | "Froze Over" | Lawrence, West | 3:31 |
| 8. | "Between Us" | Tim Mensy, Tony Haselden | 3:32 |
| 9. | "April's Fool" | Ralph Howard Jr., Wayne Davis, Bernie Faulkner, Keith Perry | 3:52 |
| 10. | "I Hope Heaven Has a Honky Tonk" | Jim Carter, Sherri Stapleton | 2:36 |

== Personnel ==
From Sticks and Stones liner notes.

Musicians

- Tracy Lawrence - lead vocals
- Bruce Bouton - steel guitar, Dobro
- Mark Casstevens - acoustic guitar, harmonica
- Liana Manis - background vocals
- Brent Rowan - electric guitar
- Milton Sledge - drums on all tracks except "Between Us"
- Gary W. Smith - keyboards, piano, synthesizer
- Joe Spivey - fiddle
- James Stroud - drums on "Between Us"
- Glenn Worf - bass guitar
- Curtis Young - background vocals

Technical

- Milan Bogdan - digital editing
- Brian Hardin - mixing
- Russ Martin - recording
- Pat McMacon - recording, mixing
- Glenn Meadows - mastering
- Lynn Peterzell - recording
- Billy Sherrill - recording
- James Stroud - production

== Chart performance ==
| Chart (1991) | Peak position |
|---|---|
| U.S. Billboard Top Country Albums | 10 |
| U.S. Billboard 200 | 71 |
| Canadian RPM Country Albums | 7 |
