= For the Love =

Studio album by Tracy Lawrence
- Released: January 30, 2007
- Genre: Country
- Length: 38:42
- Label: Rocky Comfort Records
- Producers: Flip Anderson; Julian King; Tracy Lawrence

Tracy Lawrence chronology
Then & Now: The Hits Collection (2005)	For the Love (2007)	The Very Best of Tracy Lawrence (2007)

Singles from For the Love
- 1. "Find Out Who Your Friends Are" Released: August 21, 2006

For the Love is the ninth studio album by American country music artist Tracy Lawrence. It was released on January 30, 2007, by Rocky Comfort Records. It debuted at #53 on the Billboard 200. Three singles were released from the album: "Find Out Who Your Friends Are" reached #1 on the Billboard Hot Country Songs chart and became Lawrence's first chart-topping song since "Time Marches On" in mid-1996. The album's second single, "Til I Was a Daddy Too", reached #32 on the same chart, which would be his final Top 40 Hit on that chart, "You Can't Hide Redneck" was released in October 2008 as the third single, peaking at #56 on the Billboard Hot Country Songs chart.

== Track listing ==
No.	Title	Writer(s)	Length
1.	"Find Out Who Your Friends Are"	Casey Beathard, Ed Hill	3:49
2.	"Just Like Her"	Wil Nance, Odie Blackmon	2:36
3.	"You Can't Hide Redneck"	Beathard, Dan DeMay	3:53
4.	"For the Love" (duet with Brad Arnold of 3 Doors Down)	Paul Nelson, Rick Huckaby	3:20
5.	"As Easy as Our Blessings"	Tony Martin, Mark Nesler	3:32
6.	"Speed of Flight"	Tracy Lawrence	4:04
7.	"Rock and a Soft Place"	Mike Brown, Flip Anderson, Huckaby	3:46
8.	"Til I Was a Daddy Too"	Larry Boone, Lawrence, Nelson	3:59
9.	"You're Why God Made Me"	Billy Yates, Nance	3:09
10.	"Just Like That"	Brown, Anderson	2:49
11.	"Find Out Who Your Friends Are" (alternate recording featuring Tim McGraw and Kenny Chesney)	Beathard, Hill	3:45

=== Non-album Tracks ===
1. "I'm Gonna Finish Leaving You" (Tony Martin, Mark Nesler, Tom Shapiro) - 3:25
  - B-side of "Til I Was a Daddy Too"
2. "What You Want" (Casey Beathard) - 3:23
  - B-side of "You Can't Hide Redneck"

== Personnel ==
- Brad Arnold - vocals on track 4
- Eddie Bayers - drums
- Mike Brignardello - bass guitar
- Joe Caverlee - fiddle
- Kenny Chesney - vocals on track 11
- Dan Dugmore - steel guitar, Dobro
- Paul Franklin - steel guitar, dobro
- Tony Harrell - piano, keyboards
- Aubrey Haynie - fiddle
- Patrick Lassiter - bass guitar
- Tracy Lawrence - lead vocals
- B. James Lowry - acoustic guitar
- Brent Mason - electric guitar
- Tim McGraw - vocals on track 11
- Steve Nathan - piano, keyboards
- Loren Nelson - steel guitar, dobro
- Dennis Parker - acoustic guitar
- Steve Poole - piano, keyboards
- Darryl Preston - electric guitar
- Gregg Stocki - drums
- Glenn Worf - bass guitar

== Charts ==
=== Weekly charts ===
Chart (2007)	Peak position
US Billboard 200	53
US Top Country Albums (Billboard)	6
US Independent Albums (Billboard)	3

=== Year-end charts ===
Chart (2007)	Position
US Top Country Albums (Billboard)	39
