= Alibis (album) =

Studio album by Tracy Lawrence
- Released: March 9, 1993
- Recorded: 1992
- Studio: Eleven, Eleven Sound, Mesa Recording, Sound Stage Studios, Nashville, TN
- Genre: Country
- Length: 31:46
- Label: Atlantic
- Producer: James Stroud

Tracy Lawrence chronology
Sticks and Stones (1991)	Alibis (1993)	I See It Now (1994)

Singles from Alibis
- 1. "Alibis" Released: February 11, 1993; 2. "Can't Break It to My Heart" Released: June 5, 1993; 3. "My Second Home" Released: September 16, 1993; 4. "If the Good Die Young" Released: January 24, 1994

Professional ratings
Review scores
Source	Rating
AllMusic	4/5 stars

Alibis is the second studio album by American country music artist Tracy Lawrence. It was released on March 9, 1993, by Atlantic Records. It was certified platinum in the United States, the album produced the singles "Can't Break It to My Heart", "Alibis", "My Second Home", and "If the Good Die Young", all number-one hits on the Billboard Hot Country Singles & Tracks chart. The album is certified 2× Multi-Platinum by the RIAA for shipments of two million copies. It was recorded by James Stroud in full analog at his home studios.

== Track listing ==
Alibis track listing
No.	Title	Writer(s)	Length
1.	"I Threw the Rest Away"	Gene Nelson, Paul Nelson	3:28
2.	"Can't Break It to My Heart"	Kirk Roth, Tracy Lawrence, Earl Clark, Elbert West	2:53
3.	"We Don't Love Here Anymore"	Kenny Beard, Bob Alan, Jimmy Darrell	3:07
4.	"Crying Ain't Dying"	Don Schlitz, Mark Irwin	3:12
5.	"Alibis"	Randy Boudreaux	3:02
6.	"My Second Home"	Lawrence, Beard, P. Nelson	2:44
7.	"Don't Talk to Me That Way"	Reese Wilson, Billy Spencer	3:48
8.	"It Only Takes One Bar (To Make a Prison)"	Beard, Lawrence, P. Nelson	3:31
9.	"Back to Back"	Lawrence, West	3:13
10.	"If the Good Die Young"	P. Nelson, Craig Wiseman	2:26

== Personnel ==
=== Musicians ===
- Eddie Bayers – drums
- Larry Byrom – acoustic guitar
- Mark Casstevens – acoustic guitar
- Sonny Garrish – steel guitar, Dobro
- Tracy Lawrence – lead vocals
- Chris Leuzinger – electric guitar
- Brent Rowan – electric guitar
- Gary Smith – piano, synthesizer
- Joe Spivey – fiddle
- James Stroud – drums, percussion
- Glenn Worf – bass guitar
- Curtis Wright – background vocals
- Curtis Young – background vocals

=== Technical ===
- Derek Bason – mixing assistant
- Jeff Giedt – assistant engineer
- Kelly Giedt – assistant producer
- Julian King – engineering, mixing
- Steve Marcantonio – engineer
- Glenn Meadows – mastering
- Lynn Peterzell – engineer, mixing

== Charts ==
=== Weekly charts ===
Chart (1993)	Peak position
Canadian Country Albums (RPM)	5
US Billboard 200	25
US Top Country Albums (Billboard)	5

=== Year-end charts ===
Chart (1993)	Position
US Billboard 200	92
US Top Country Albums (Billboard)	19
Chart (1994)	Position
US Top Country Albums (Billboard)	69
