= I See It Now =

Studio album by Tracy Lawrence
- Released: September 20, 1994
- Genre: Country
- Length: 34:08
- Label: Atlantic
- Producer: James Stroud; Flip Anderson (tracks 4–6); Tracy Lawrence (tracks 4–6)

Tracy Lawrence chronology
Alibis (1993)	I See It Now (1994)	Tracy Lawrence Live (1995)

Singles from I See It Now
- 1. "I See It Now" Released: August 29, 1994; 2. "As Any Fool Can See" Released: December 13, 1994; 3. "Texas Tornado" Released: April 3, 1995; 4. "If the World Had a Front Porch" Released: August 5, 1995

Professional ratings
Review scores
Source	Rating
AllMusic	link
Entertainment Weekly	B+ link

I See It Now is the third studio album by American country music artist Tracy Lawrence. It was released on September 20, 1994, by Atlantic Records. The album produced four singles - the title track, "If the World Had a Front Porch", "Texas Tornado", and "As Any Fool Can See". Of these, "Texas Tornado" was a number-one song on the Hot Country Songs chart, while the other singles all reached number two on the same chart. "Hillbilly with a Heartache", a duet with John Anderson, can also be found on Anderson's 1994 album Country 'til I Die. "I Got a Feelin'" was co-written by Joe Diffie, who later recorded it for his 1997 album Twice Upon a Time.

== Track listing ==
No.	Title	Writer(s)	Length
1.	"I See It Now"	Larry Boone, Woody Lee, Paul Nelson	3:37
2.	"Guilt Trip"	Tony Haselden, Tim Mensy	3:27
3.	"If the World Had a Front Porch"	Kenny Beard, Tracy Lawrence, Nelson	3:05
4.	"Texas Tornado"	Bobby Braddock	3:24
5.	"Hillbilly with a Heartache" (duet with John Anderson)	Bobby Alexander, Cris Moore, Richard E. Carpenter	3:43
6.	"As Any Fool Can See"	Beard, Nelson	3:03
7.	"God Made Woman on a Good Day"	Troy Seals, Brett Jones	3:14
8.	"I Got a Feelin'""	Joe Diffie, Lonnie Wilson	2:51
9.	"The Cards"	Nelson, Kirk Roth	3:52
10.	"I'd Give Anything to Be Your Everything Again"	Jerry Laseter, Mark Alan Springer	3:46

== Personnel ==
As listed in liner notes.

- John Anderson – duet vocals (5)
- Eddie Bayers – drums (1–6, 8–10)
- Dennis Burnside – piano (4–6)
- Larry Byrom – acoustic guitar (1–3, 7–10)
- Kimberly Fleming – background vocals (7)
- Paul Franklin – Dobro, steel guitar, Pedabro (1–3, 7–10)
- Sonny Garrish – steel guitar (4–6)
- Vickie Hampton – background vocals (7)
- Dann Huff – electric guitar (1–3, 7–10)
- Tracy Lawrence – lead vocals (all tracks)
- Chris Leuzinger – electric guitar (5)
- Donna McElroy – background vocals (7)
- Terry McMillan – harmonica, percussion (all tracks)
- Steve Nathan – piano, keyboards (1–3, 7–10)
- Brent Rowan – acoustic and electric guitars (4, 6)
- Joe Spivey – fiddle (1–3, 6–10), Ace guitar (4), acoustic guitar (5)
- James Stroud – drums (7)
- Dennis Wilson – background vocals (1–6, 8–10)
- Willie Weeks – bass guitar (4–6)
- Glenn Worf – bass guitar (1–3, 7–10)
- Curtis Young – background vocals (1–6, 8–10)

== Production credits ==
- Tracks 1–3, 7–10 - James Stroud
- Track 4 - Tracy Lawrence
- Track 5 - Tracy Lawrence, Flip Anderson, James Stroud
- Track 6 - Tracy Lawrence, Flip Anderson

== Charts ==
=== Weekly charts ===
Chart (1994)	Peak position
US Billboard 200	28
US Top Country Albums (Billboard)	3

=== Year-end charts ===
Chart (1994)	Position
US Top Country Albums (Billboard)	70

Chart (1995)	Position
US Billboard 200	107
US Top Country Albums (Billboard)	18

== Certifications ==
Region	Certification	Certified units/sales
Canada (Music Canada)	Gold	50,000^{^}
United States (RIAA)	Platinum	1,000,000^{^}
^{^} Shipments figures based on certification alone.
