= The Rock (Tracy Lawrence album) =

Studio album by Tracy Lawrence
- Released: June 9, 2009
- Genre: Country/Christian
- Length: 34:16
- Label: Rocky Comfort/CO5
- Producers: Julian King, Tracy Lawrence

Tracy Lawrence chronology
All Wrapped Up in Christmas (2007)	The Rock (2009)	The Singer (2011)

Professional ratings
Review scores
Source	Rating
Country Weekly	3.5/5 stars

The Rock is the tenth studio album by American country music artist Tracy Lawrence. His first album of Christian music, it was released on June 9, 2009, on his own Rocky Comfort label. Lead-off single "Up to Him" debuted at number 57 on the Hot Country Songs chart, and reached 47 shortly after the album's release.

Country Weekly gave the album 3.5 stars out of 5, saying that it "emphasizes at all turns the shared imperfections that we all strive to overcome in order to be good people".

== Track listing ==
1. "Dear Lord" (Flip Anderson, Tracy Lawrence) – 3:18
2. "Every Prayer" (Michael Dulaney, Greg Johnson) – 3:02
3. "I'm Done" (Steve Seskin, Allen Shamblin) – 3:29
4. "The Book You Never Read" (Michael T. Post, Fred Wilhelm) – 3:57
5. "The Rock" (Jeff Batson, Aaron Scherz, Thom Shepherd) – 4:03
6. "Somebody Who Would Die for You" (Mark Narmore, Adam Wheeler) – 3:47
7. "Jesus Come Talk to Your Children" (Rick Huckaby, Paul Nelson) – 2:45
8. "I Know Where Heaven Is" (Dave Berg, Annie Tate, Sam Tate) – 3:37
9. "Up to Him" (Tim Johnson, David Kent) – 2:56
10. "Say a Prayer" (Jimmy Melton, Craig Morgan, Phil O'Donnell) – 3:22

== Personnel ==
- Gregg Stocki- drums
- Joe Caverlee- fiddle, mandolin
- Melodie Crittenden- background vocals
- Wes Hightower- background vocals
- Patrick Lassiter- bass guitar
- Tracy Lawrence- lead vocals
- B. James Lowry- acoustic guitar
- Brent Mason- electric guitar
- Kim Parent- background vocals
- Steve Poole- keyboards

== Chart performance ==
Album

The album debuted at number 20 on Billboard's Top Country Albums chart, becoming Lawrence's lowest-peaking studio album. It also became his second album to not chart in the Top 100 of the Billboard 200 charts. While the album did not fare as well commercially as his other releases, it did garner Lawrence his first Grammy nomination, which was in the Best Southern, Country or Bluegrass Gospel Album category.

Chart (2009)	Peak position
U.S. Billboard Top Country Albums	20
U.S. Billboard 200	104
U.S. Billboard Top Independent Albums	19
U.S. Billboard Top Christian Albums	4

Singles

Year	Single	Peak positions
Year	Single	US Country
2009	"Up to Him"	47
2009	"Somebody Who Would Die for You"	—
"—" denotes releases that did not chart
