= Used to the Pain =

1998 single by Mark Nesler

Single by Mark Nesler

from the album I'm Just That Way
- Released: 1998
- Genre: Country
- Length: 3:25
- Label: Asylum
- Songwriters: Tony Martin, Mark Nesler
- Producers: Kyle Lehning, Jerry Crutchfield

Mark Nesler singles chronology
"Used to the Pain" (1998)	"Slow Down" (1998)

"Used to the Pain"

Single by Tracy Lawrence

from the album Then & Now: The Hits Collection
- Released: July 9, 2005
- Genre: Country
- Length: 3:14
- Label: Mercury
- Songwriters: Tony Martin, Mark Nesler
- Producers: Tracy Lawerence, James Stroud

Tracy Lawrence singles chronology
"Sawdust on Her Halo" (2005)	"Used to the Pain" (2005)	"If I Don't Make It Back" (2005)

"Used to the Pain" is a song co-written and originally recorded by American country music singer Mark Nesler. Nesler wrote the song with Tony Martin, and recorded the song for his debut album I'm Just That Way (1998).

It was also recorded by American country music artist Tracy Lawrence, whose version was released in July 2005 as the first single from his compilation album Then & Now: The Hits Collection. The song reached No. 35 on the Billboard Hot Country Songs chart.

== Chart performance ==
Mark Nesler

Chart (1998)	Peak position
US Hot Country Songs (Billboard)	47
Canadian RPM Country Tracks	43

Tracy Lawrence

Chart (2005)	Peak position
US Hot Country Songs (Billboard)	35
