= Life Don't Have to Be So Hard =

Single by Tracy Lawrence

from the album Tracy Lawrence
- Released: September 1, 2001
- Genre: Country
- Length: 3:14
- Label: Warner Bros. Nashville
- Songwriter(s): Casey Beathard, Kenny D. West
- Producer(s): Tracy Lawrence, Flip Anderson

Tracy Lawrence singles chronology
"Unforgiven" (2001)	"Life Don't Have to Be So Hard" (2001)	"What a Memory" (2002)

"Life Don't Be So Hard" is a song recorded by American country music artist Tracy Lawrence. It was released in September 2001 as the first single from the album Tracy Lawrence. The song reached #36 on the Billboard Hot Country Singles & Tracks chart. The song was written by Casey Beathard and Kenny D. West.

== Chart performance ==
Chart (2001)	Peak position
US Hot Country Songs (Billboard)	36
