= Runnin' Behind =

Single by Tracy Lawrence

from the album Sticks and Stones
- Released: June 8, 1992
- Recorded: 1991
- Genre: Country
- Length: 2:55
- Label: Atlantic
- Songwriters: Mark D. Sanders; Ed Hill
- Producer: James Stroud

Tracy Lawrence singles chronology
"Today's Lonely Fool" (1992)	"Runnin' Behind" (1992)	"Somebody Paints the Wall" (1992)

"Runnin' Behind" is a song written by Mark D. Sanders and Ed Hill, and recorded by American country music artist Tracy Lawrence. It was released in June 1992 as the third single from his debut album, Sticks and Stones. It peaked at number 4 on the U.S. Billboard Hot Country Singles & Tracks chart and at number 6 on the Canadian RPM Country Tracks chart. This song was also featured on Tracy Lawrence Live and Unplugged and The Very Best of Tracy Lawrence.

== Critical reception ==
Deborah Evans Price, of Billboard magazine reviewed the song favorably, saying that Lawrence delivers the "swing ditty and its working class storyline with snap."

== Music video ==
The music video features Tracy and his band playing on stage at a Siesta Key.. It switches from evening to night.

== Chart performance ==
"Runnin' Behind" debuted at number 63 on the U.S. Billboard Hot Country Singles & Tracks for the week of June 20, 1992.

Chart (1992)	Peak position
Canada Country Singles (RPM)	6
US Hot Country Songs (Billboard)	4

=== Year-end charts ===
Chart (1992)	Position
Canada Country Tracks (RPM)	86
US Country Songs (Billboard)	37
