= Tracy Lawrence (album) =

Studio album by Tracy Lawrence
- Released: October 23, 2001
- Genre: Country
- Length: 40:38
- Label: Warner Records
- Producer: Tracy Lawrence, Flip Anderson

Tracy Lawrence chronology
Lessons Learned (2000)	Tracy Lawrence (2001)	Strong (2004)

Singles from Tracy Lawrence
- 1. "Life Don't Have to Be So Hard" Released: August 27, 2002; 2. "What a Memory" Released: February 4, 2003

Professional ratings
Review scores
Source	Rating
Allmusic	4/5 stars

Tracy Lawrence is the seventh studio album by American country music artist of the same name. It was released on October 23, 2001 by Warner Records. Only two singles were released from this album: "Life Don't Have to Be So Hard" and "What a Memory", the latter of which failed to make Top 40 on the country charts. "That Was Us" was later recorded by Randy Travis on his 2004 album Passing Through.

== Track listing ==
No.	Title	Writer(s)	Length
1.	"Crawlin' Again"	Kenny Beard, Michael White	2:50
2.	"Life Don't Have to Be So Hard"	Casey Beathard, Kenny D. West	3:14
3.	"It's Got You All Over It"	J. B. Rudd, Jerry Salley, Lance Miller	2:59
4.	"Getting Back Up"	Marla Cannon-Goodman, Bobby Pinson	4:12
5.	"It's Hard to Be an Outlaw"	Paul Nelson, Larry Boone, Pinson	3:29
6.	"Meant to Be"	Tracy Lawrence, Flip Anderson, Rick Huckaby	3:21
7.	"That Was Us"	Craig Wiseman, Tony Lane	3:20
8.	"She Loved the Devil Out of Me"	Eric Clark, Lawrence, Huckaby	3:13
9.	"Whole Lot of Lettin' Go"	Nelson, Boone, Lawrence	3:13
10.	"What a Memory"	Beard, Jeff Bates	4:27
11.	"God's Green Earth"	Billy Yates, Monty Criswell	2:43
12.	"I Won All the Battles"	Nelson, Boone, Lawrence	3:37

== Personnel ==
From Liner Notes

- Alison Brown - banjo on "She Loved the Devil Out of Me" and "God's Green Earth"
- Eric Darken - percussion
- Sonny Garrish - steel guitar, Dobro on "Life Don't Have to Be So Hard" and "That Was Us", pedabro on "Crawlin' Again"
- Owen Hale - drums
- Aubrey Haynie - fiddle, mandolin on "Whole Lot of Lettin' Go"
- Wes Hightower - background vocals
- Tracy Lawrence - lead vocals
- B. James Lowry - acoustic guitar
- Liana Manis - background vocals
- Gary Lunn - bass guitar
- Brent Rowan - electric guitar, banjo on "I Won All the Battles"
- Gary Smith - keyboards

== Chart performance ==
Chart (2001)	Peak position
U.S. Billboard Top Country Albums	13
U.S. Billboard 200	136
