= Strong (Tracy Lawrence album) =

Studio album by Tracy Lawrence
- Released: March 30, 2004
- Genre: Country
- Label: DreamWorks Records
- Producer: James Stroud

Tracy Lawrence chronology
Tracy Lawrence (2001)	Strong (2004)	Then & Now: The Hits Collection (2005)

Singles from Strong
- 1. "Paint Me a Birmingham" Released: October 13, 2003; 2. "It's All How You Look at It" Released: June 11, 2004; 3. "Sawdust on Her Halo" Released: July 13, 2004

Professional ratings
Review scores
Source	Rating
Allmusic	3/5 stars

Strong is the eighth studio album by American country music artist Tracy Lawrence. It was released on March 30, 2004 by DreamWorks Records. It produced three singles for him on the Billboard Hot Country Singles & Tracks (now Hot Country Songs) charts: "Paint Me a Birmingham" (#4), "It's All How You Look at It" (#35) and "Sawdust on Her Halo" (#48). "Paint Me a Birmingham" was also recorded in 2003 by Ken Mellons on his album Sweet, from which it was released as a single shortly before Lawrence's rendition.

Strong is Lawrence's first album where he did not write or co-write any of the tracks.

== Track listing ==
No.	Title	Writer(s)	Length
1.	"It's All How You Look at It"	Rivers Rutherford, Dave Berg, Georgia Middleman	3:04
2.	"Strong"	Bob Regan, Jimmy Ritchey	4:29
3.	"Stones"	Jimbeau Hinson, Kim Tribble, Jon Michaels	3:54
4.	"Paint Me a Birmingham"	Gary Duffy, Buck Moore	3:47
5.	"Everywhere but Hollywood"	Jason Sellers, Bobby Pinson, Ritchey	3:07
6.	"A Far Cry from You"	Tony Lane, Jess Brown, Robin English	3:49
7.	"Bobby Darwin's Daughter"	Larry Boone, Paul Nelson, Rick Huckaby	4:18
8.	"What the Flames Feel Like"	Marty Dodson, George Teren	3:33
9.	"Sawdust on Her Halo"	Monty Criswell, Huckaby	3:14
10.	"When Daddy Was a Strong Man"	Casey Beathard, Kendell Marvel	4:00
11.	"Think of Me"	Nelson, Lewis Anderson	4:11
12.	"The Questionnaire"	Aaron Barker, Phillip Douglas, Ron Harbin	3:40

== Personnel ==
- Dan Dugmore - steel guitar
- Shannon Forrest - drums
- Paul Franklin - steel guitar
- Aubrey Haynie - fiddle, mandolin
- Tracy Lawrence - lead vocals
- Gary Lunn - bass guitar
- Liana Manis - background vocals
- Brent Mason - electric guitar
- Steve Nathan - piano, keyboards
- John Wesley Ryles - background vocals
- Biff Watson - acoustic guitar
- Bergen White - string arrangements, conductor

== Charts ==
=== Weekly charts ===
Chart (2004)	Peak position
US Billboard 200	17
US Top Country Albums (Billboard)	2

=== Year-end charts ===
Chart (2004)	Position
US Top Country Albums (Billboard)	38
