= Find Out Who Your Friends Are =

Single by Tracy Lawrence

from the album For the Love
- Released: August 21, 2006
- Genre: Country, country rock
- Length: 3:49
- Label: Rocky Comfort
- Songwriters: Casey Beathard; Ed Hill
- Producers: Julian King; Tracy Lawrence

Tracy Lawrence singles chronology
"If I Don't Make It Back" (2005)	"Find Out Who Your Friends Are" (2006)	"Til I Was a Daddy Too" (2007)

"Find Out Who Your Friends Are" is a song written by Casey Beathard and Ed Hill, and recorded by American country music artist Tracy Lawrence. It was the lead-off single for his album For the Love, which was released in early 2007 on Rocky Comfort Records, a label which Lawrence owns. The song was originally released to radio stations on August 21, 2006, ahead of its album release on January 30, 2007. The single did not enter the Top 40 on the Billboard Hot Country Songs chart until January 2007.

After the release of For the Love, radio stations began to play an alternate version of the song which featured guest vocals from Tim McGraw and Kenny Chesney, thus helping to boost the song to Number One on both the Billboard and Mediabase country singles charts. Upon reaching Number One in June 2007, "Find Out Who Your Friends Are" set a new record for the slowest-climbing Number One single in the history of the Billboard country music chart, as well as the second-slowest climbing on any Billboard singles chart. In addition, it became Lawrence's first Billboard Number One since 1996's "Time Marches On", ten years earlier.

== Content ==
"Find Out Who Your Friends Are" is a mid-tempo in which the narrator tells of various situations where a person might be in trouble, and thus might need a friend's help – such as having a car stuck in a ditch, or being short on money. The song's chorus states that in such moments, a person finds out who his or her friends are.

Upon hearing the song, Lawrence said that he immediately identified with its message, and thought that it would be a good choice for a lead-off single to his album. According to him, "The message is universal for everybody you know […] I enjoy singing stuff that has a good message."

== Chart performance ==
"Find Out Who Your Friends Are" made its debut on the Hot Country Songs chart dated September 19, 2006. The song did not enter Top 40 until the chart dated for January 13, 2007, although it fell out of the Top 40 a week later. By the January 27 charts, the song had re-entered.

It reached Number One on the Billboard Hot Country Songs chart dated June 23, 2007, where it stayed for one week. The song became Lawrence's first Billboard Number One single since "Time Marches On" in 1996, and his first Number One on any major trade chart since 1997's "Is That a Tear", which reached Number One on the former Radio & Records country chart.

Having reached the top of the chart in its 41st chart week, the song also set a new record for the slowest climb to Number One on the country chart, as well as a record for the second-slowest climb for a Number One single on any Billboard chart behind only "If You're Gone" by Matchbox Twenty, which peaked on the Adult Contemporary chart in its 42nd week. "Find Out Who Your Friends Are" also replaced Emerson Drive's "Moments" at Number One, marking the first time since 1950 that two artists on independently distributed labels reached Number One back-to-back on the singles chart. In addition, Lawrence became the first artist to reach Number One with the first release from a self-owned record label.

== Cease and desist order ==
Lawrence's album For the Love features two versions of the song: one version sung by Lawrence himself, and a remixed version featuring guest vocals from country music artists Tim McGraw and Kenny Chesney, both of whom are friends of Lawrence's. Only the solo version was released to radio as a single; however, upon the release of Lawrence's album, several radio stations began playing the version with McGraw and Chesney's vocals instead. (Both versions were counted as one song when the singles charts were tabulated.)

The week before the single reached Number One, Sony BMG (the parent company of BNA Records, the label to which Chesney was signed at the time) e-mailed a cease-and-desist order to several radio stations that were monitored by Billboard, demanding that these stations cease playing the version featuring McGraw and Chesney's vocals. According to the letter, which was written by Sony BMG's president, Sony BMG "did not grant 'singles' rights to Rocky Comfort with respect to the album versions of this song and has not authorized any radio station to play this recording". Despite the demands from Sony BMG, radio stations did not stop playing the version with McGraw and Chesney. One day after the release of that letter, Sony BMG issued a formal apology to the radio stations to which the cease-and-desist order had been sent.

== Music video ==
A music video for the song debuted on the television network CMT on August 16, 2007, at which point the song had fallen from the charts and entered recurrent rotation. In the video, a man (Ronnie Gilley of Enterprise, AL) hits a circumstance similar to the lyrics of the song and finds himself stranded "in the middle of nowhere." Though his cellular reception is very poor, he is able to contact George Jones, who then calls Darryl Worley (who is relaxing in a pool with several women) and several others. Worley then calls Roy Oswalt who is working out with several other athletes; everyone contacted arrives in a cavalcade of vehicles to help with the predicament. Larry the Cable Guy makes a cameo in the video. The video is directed by Flick Wiltshire.

== Chart performance ==
Chart (2006–2007)	Peak position
Canada Country (Billboard)	6
Canada Hot 100 (Billboard)	69
US Hot Country Songs (Billboard)	1
US Billboard Hot 100	61
US Billboard Pop 100	96

=== Year-end charts ===
Chart (2007)	Position
US Country Songs (Billboard)	16
