= Elroy Kahanek =

Elroy D. Kahanek (March 27, 1941 – March 11, 2014) was a record industry official and songwriter. He was involved with promoting various successful musicians and their work for RCA Records, Sunbird Records, Atlantic Records, and Bang II Records. He also helped write several hit songs including "Somebody Paints the Wall", "She's Playing Hard to Forget", "The Fool Who Fooled Around", and "Tryin' to Beat the Morning Home".

In the 1970s he worked for RCA Records and was involved in its “outlaw music” era, promoting works by artists including Waylon Jennings. He worked with Earl Thomas Conley at Sunbird and Tracy Lawrence and John Michael Montgomery at Atlantic.

He was a robbery victim. Late in his career he worked for Bang II Records in Nashville.
