= Maverick (soundtrack) =

1994 soundtrack album

Soundtrack album by Various Artists
- Released: May 17, 1994
- Genre: Country
- Length: 40:53
- Label: Atlantic Records
- Producer: Various Artists

Singles from Maverick
- 1. "Renegades, Rebels and Rogues" Released: May 16, 1994

Maverick is the soundtrack to the 1994 American film of the same name. It was released in 1994 by Atlantic Records. The album peaked at number four on the Billboard Top Country Albums chart.

== Overview ==
Three cuts from the album made the Hot Country Songs charts: "Renegades, Rebels and Rogues", performed by Tracy Lawrence, reached number 7; Clint Black's "A Good Run of Bad Luck", which also appeared on his album No Time to Kill, reached number 1; and Carlene Carter's "Something Already Gone" reached number 43.

The final track, a rendition of "Amazing Grace", is credited to the "Maverick Choir". Performers on the song are John Anderson, Archer/Park (Randy Archer and Johnny Park), Clint Black, Suzy Bogguss, Gary Chapman, Billy Dean, Radney Foster, James Garner, Mel Gibson, Amy Grant, Noel Haggard, Faith Hill, Waylon Jennings, Hal Ketchum, Tracy Lawrence, Kathy Mattea, Reba McEntire, John Michael Montgomery, Michael Omartian, Eddie Rabbitt, Restless Heart, Ricky Van Shelton, Danny Shirley (of Confederate Railroad), Larry Stewart (who at this point was not a member of Restless Heart), Joy Lynn White, and Tammy Wynette, with lead vocals by Black and Grant on the first verse, McEntire with Restless Heart on the second verse, Jennings with Wynette on the third verse, Ketchum on the fourth verse, and Dean with Mattea on the fifth and final verses. All royalties from this rendition were donated to the Elizabeth Glaser Pediatric AIDS Foundation. Mark Hartley and Larry Fitzgerald were the album's executive producers.

== Track listing ==
No.	Title	Writer(s)	Producer	Length
1.	"Renegades, Rebels and Rogues" (Tracy Lawrence)	Larry Boone, Earl Clark, Paul Nelson	Tracy Lawrence	2:36
2.	"A Good Run of Bad Luck" (Clint Black)	Clint Black, Hayden Nicholas	James Stroud, Black	2:43
3.	"Maverick" (Restless Heart)	David Buttolph, Paul Francis Webster	Josh Leo	2:40
4.	"Ophelia" (Vince Gill)	Robbie Robertson	Vince Gill, Michael Omartian	3:38
5.	"Something Already Gone" (Carlene Carter)	Al Anderson, Carlene Carter	Carter, Stroud	3:34
6.	"Dream On Texas Ladies" (John Michael Montgomery)	Steve Dan Mills	Doug Johnson	3:08
7.	"Ladies Love Outlaws" (Confederate Railroad)	Lee Clayton	Barry Beckett	3:39
8.	"Solitary Travelers" (Hal Ketchum)	Hal Ketchum	Allen Reynolds, Jim Rooney	4:26
9.	"The Rainbow Down the Road" (Radney Foster and Patty Loveless)	Radney Foster, Emory Gordy Jr.	Emory Gordy Jr.	2:57
10.	"You Don't Mess Around with Me" (Waylon Jennings)	Waylon Jennings	Don Was	4:26
11.	"Ride Gambler Ride" (Randy Newman)	Randy Newman	James Newton Howard	3:52
12.	"Amazing Grace" (Maverick Choir)	John Newton	Omartian	3:14
Total length:				40:53

== Chart performance ==
Chart (1994)	Peak position
U.S. Billboard Top Country Albums	4
U.S. Billboard 200	35
Canadian RPM Country Albums	1
Canadian RPM Top Albums	63

== Certifications ==
Region	Certification	Certified units/sales
United States (RIAA)	Gold	500,000^{^}
^{^} Shipments figures based on certification alone.

== Score album ==
Maverick (Original Motion Picture Score)

Soundtrack album by Randy Newman
- Released: January 10, 1995
- Recorded: 1994
- Genre: Score
- Length: 41:58
- Label: Reprise Records
- Producer: Frank Wolf

Randy Newman chronology
The Paper (1994)	Maverick (Original Motion Picture Score) (1995)	Toy Story (1995)

Maverick (Original Motion Picture Score) is the soundtrack album to the film featuring composer Randy Newman's musical score.

Track listing

1. Opening
2. Annabelle
3. Fight
4. Coop
5. Money in the Bank
6. In & Out of Trouble
7. Magic Cards, Maybe/Lucky Shirt
8. Headed for the Game
9. Runaway Stage
10. Sneakin' Around
11. Maverick
12. Joseph & the Russian
13. Oh Bret
14. A Noble Aims
15. Trap
16. The Hanging
17. Bret Escapes
18. Bret's Card/Sore Loser
19. Coop Sails Away
20. Annabelle Toodleoo
21. The Commodore
22. Pappy Shuffle
23. Bath House
24. Tartine de Merde
