= Julian King (sound engineer) =

American recording engineer

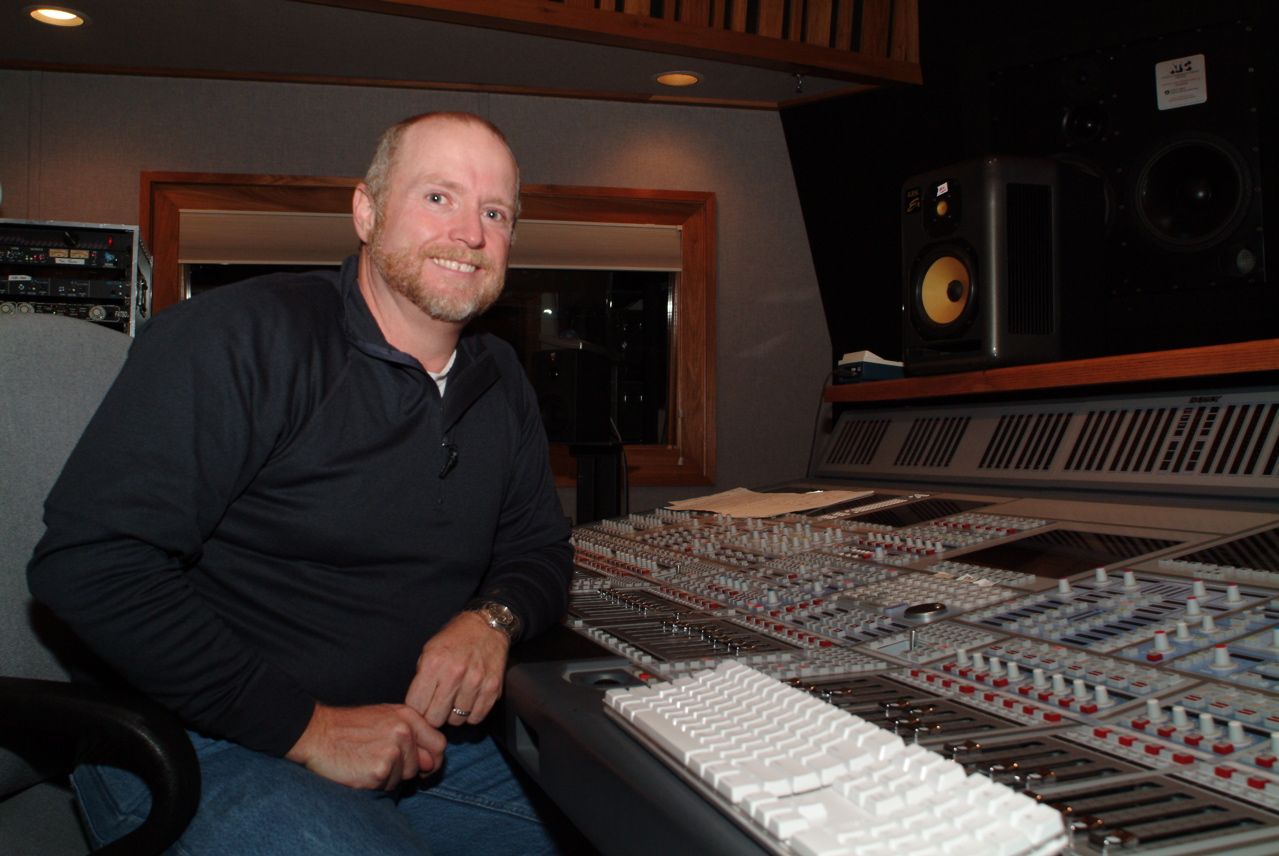
- Julian King in the Studio
- Occupations: recording engineer, mix engineer, record producer and musician
- Years active: 1987–present

Julian King is an American recording engineer, mix engineer, record producer and musician based in Nashville, Tennessee. King earned a Grammy as the recording engineer of Faith Hill's multi-million-selling, pop-crossover album Breathe.

In one capacity or another, he has been involved with records that have sold more than 100 million units (see listing below). King has worked with some of the most notable artists in country music, such as George Jones, George Strait, Waylon Jennings, Willie Nelson, Kenny Rogers and Merle Haggard. Other artists he has worked with include Tim McGraw, Vince Gill, Charlie Daniels, Hank Williams, Jr., Clint Black, Martina McBride, Randy Travis, Brooks & Dunn, Toby Keith, Alabama and The Judds. His credits also extend to some of the hottest young acts in country music today, such as Sugarland, Chris Young, Kellie Pickler, Lauren Alaina and Casey James.

== History ==
Raised by school principal parents in Charlottesville, Virginia, King attended nearby James Madison University as a music major, with a plan to become a session trumpet player, but his true calling was tied to using technology to reproduce music. In 1987, during his junior year at college, he landed an internship working as "an assistant to the assistant" engineer at recording sessions for producer Jimmy Bowen. King learned quickly and was told a job would be there for him when he graduated the following year. Working under producer Bowen, King was instantly in sessions with such country superstars as George Strait. While working on an album with Charlie Daniels, King was teased by the star for being a trumpeter. Eventually, Daniels not only asked King to play trumpet on the record, he paid for King to join the American Federation of Musicians union.

In time, King became a favorite of top producers James Stroud and Byron Gallimore. Some of the earliest Number One hits King engineered were the career-launching singles by Tracy Lawrence and Clay Walker. One of his favorite projects from those early years is the 1992 John Anderson CD Seminole Wind. In 1993, he was tapped to engineer the disc debut of the then-unknown Tim McGraw. King has engineered every Tim McGraw album since that time. He also helped create the sound that kick-started Toby Keith's career.

King was behind the board for Common Thread: The Songs of the Eagles, an album that won the CMA Award as Album of the Year for 1994. Stroud brought him on board as a co-producer in 1998, and King delivered "I'm Yours" as a hit for Grammy-winning singer Linda Davis. In the following year came Faith Hill's Breathe, which earned King his own Grammy Award. Noting his increasing prominence, Mix magazine profiled Julian King in 2001.

Since then, King has produced "I Should Be Sleeping" and "Only God (Could Stop Me Loving You)" as 2001–2002 hits for Emerson Drive. In 2007, King reunited with Tracy Lawrence and co-produced the star's CMA Award-winning hit "Find Out Who Your Friends Are". He has also continued to work constantly as an engineer, notably on Lee Ann Womack's 2005 CMA Album of the Year There's More Where That Came From and on the multi-million selling discs of two-time CMA Group of the Year, Sugarland. King engineered the two most recent albums by Chris Young which produced a string of five consecutive #1 hits, as well as albums by Kix Brooks (formerly of Brooks & Dunn) and American Idol finalists Kellie Pickler, Lauren Alaina and Casey James.

Most recently, King has been involved in producing Tyler Farr's debut album for Sony/BNA.

== Awards ==
- 1999 – Grammy Award – Best Country Album for Faith Hill's Breathe
- 2007 – CMA Award – Musical Event of the Year for Tracy Lawrence's Find Out Who Your Friends Are, with Tim McGraw and Kenny Chesney

== Credits ==
=== Production ===
Year	Album/"Single"	Artist
1998	I'm Yours	Linda Davis
1998	"From the Inside Out"	Linda Davis
2001	Hits	Perfect Stranger
2001	A Little Bit More of Your Love	Perfect Stranger
2002	Emerson Drive	Emerson Drive
2002	"I Should Be Sleeping"	Emerson Drive
2002	"Only God (Could Stop Me Loving You)"	Emerson Drive
2006	All Gone Fishin'	Various Artists
2007	All Wrapped Up in Christmas	Tracy Lawrence
2007	For the Love	Tracy Lawrence
2007	"Find Out Who Your Friends Are"	Tracy Lawrence
2007	"Til I Was a Daddy Too"	Tracy Lawrence
2008	"You Can't Hide Redneck"	Tracy Lawrence
2013	Redneck Crazy	Tyler Farr
2013	"Whiskey in My Water"	Tyler Farr
2013	"Redneck Crazy"	Tyler Farr
2015	Suffer in Peace	Tyler Farr
2015	"A Guy Walks Into a Bar"	Tyler Farr
2016	"Our Town"	Tyler Farr

=== Engineering/Mixing ===
Year	Album	Artist	Awards/Certification
1989	Beyond the Blue Neon	George Strait	Platinum
1989	When I Call Your Name	Vince Gill	CMA Award, 2× Platinum
1989	Simple Man	Charlie Daniels Band	Platinum
1990	Country Club	Travis Tritt	2× Platinum
1990	Finest Moments	Sandi Patti	Gold
1990	Livin' It Up	George Strait	Platinum
1990	On Down the Line	Patty Loveless	Gold
1990	Put Yourself in My Shoes	Clint Black	3× Platinum
1991	Soft Talk	Shelby Lynne	—
1992	Life's a Dance	John Michael Montgomery	3× Platinum
1992	Seminole Wind	John Anderson	2× Platinum
1992	Where Forever Begins	Neal McCoy	—
1993	Alibis	Tracy Lawrence	2× Platinum
1993	Clay Walker	Clay Walker	Platinum
1993	If Only My Heart Had a Voice	Kenny Rogers	—
1993	Letters From a Paper Ship	Billy Falcon	—
1993	More Love	Doug Stone	Gold
1993	Out of Left Field	Hank Williams Jr.	—
1993	Solid Ground	John Anderson	Gold
1993	Tim McGraw	Tim McGraw	—
1993	Written in the Stars	Rhonda Vincent	—
1994	1994	Merle Haggard	—
1994	Common Thread Songs of the Eagles	Various Artists	CMA Award, 3× Platinum
1994	Country 'Til I Die	John Anderson	—
1994	I See it Now	Tracy Lawrence	Platinum
1994	If I Could Make a Living	Clay Walker	Platinum
1994	Not a Moment Too Soon	Tim McGraw	6× Platinum
1994	One Emotion	Clint Black	Platinum
1995	All I Want	Tim McGraw	3× Platinum
1996	Greater Need	Lorrie Morgan	Gold
1996	Hindsight 20/20	Carlene Carter	—
1996	Jo Dee Messina	Jo Dee Messina	Gold
1996	Paradise	John Anderson	—
1996	Trouble Free	Rhonda Vincent	—
1996	My Relations	The Neville Brothers	—
1997	Everywhere	Tim McGraw	CMA Award, 4× Platinum
1997	Evolution	Martina McBride	3× Platinum
1997	Nothin' But the Taillights	Clint Black	Platinum
1997	Rumour Has It	Clay Walker	Platinum
1997	Shakin' Things Up	Lorrie Morgan	Gold
1997	Somebody's Comin'	Terry McMillan	—
1998	Burnin' the Roadhouse Down	Steve Wariner	Gold
1998	Faith	Faith Hill	6× Platinum
1998	I'm Alright	Jo Dee Messina	2× Platinum
1998	Prince of Egypt (Nashville)	Various Artists	Gold
1998	You and You Alone	Randy Travis	—
1999	Breathe	Faith Hill	Grammy Award, 8× Platinum
1999	How Do You Like Me Now?	Toby Keith	Platinum
1999	Man Ain't Made of Stone	Randy Travis	—
1999	Tight Rope	Brooks & Dunn	Gold
1999	D'Lectrified	Clint Black	Gold
1999	A Place in the Sun	Tim McGraw	CMA Award, 3× Platinum
2000	Burn	Jo Dee Messina	Platinum
2000	Dr. Seuss' How the Grinch Stole Christmas (Original Motion Picture Soundtrack)	Faith Hill	—
2000	Hard Rain Don't Last	Darryl Worley	—
2000	Judds Reunion Live	The Judds	—
2000	New Day Dawning	Wynonna Judd	—
2000	Songs from Dawson's Creek	Television Soundtrack	—
2001	Set This Circus Down	Tim McGraw	3× Platinum
2001	Ten Rounds	Tracy Byrd	—
2001	Thunder and Roses	Pam Tillis	—
2001	Who I Am	Jessica Andrews	Gold
2002	Can You Hear Me Now	Sawyer Brown	—
2002	Cry	Faith Hill	2× Platinum
2002	I Miss My Friend	Darryl Worley	—
2002	Tim McGraw & The Dancehall Drs.	Tim McGraw	3× Platinum
2002	Unleashed	Toby Keith	4× Platinum
2003	Have You Forgotten?	Darryl Worley	Gold
2003	Jimmy Wayne	Jimmy Wayne	—
2003	Willie Nelson & Friends Live	Willie Nelson	—
2003	Shockin' Y'All	Toby Keith	4× Platinum
2004	Greatest Hits	Lee Ann Womack	—
2004	It Will Always Be	Willie Nelson	—
2004	Letters From Home	John Michael Montgomery	—
2004	Live Like You Were Dying	Tim McGraw	CMA Award, 4× Platinum
2004	Strong	Tracy Lawrence	—
2004	You Do Your Thing	Montgomery Gentry	Platinum
2005	Chicago Wind	Merle Haggard	—
2005	Fireflies	Faith Hill	2× Platinum
2005	III	Joe Nichols	Gold
2005	Honkytonk University	Toby Keith	Platinum
2005	There's More Where That Came From	Lee Ann Womack	CMA Award, Gold
2006	Broken Bridges	Movie Soundtrack	—
2006	Enjoy the Ride	Sugarland	2× Platinum
2006	Men & Mascara	Julie Roberts	—
2006	If You're Going Through Hell	Rodney Atkins	Platinum
2007	Greatest Hits	Clay Walker	Gold
2007	Let It Go	Tim McGraw	Platinum
2007	Unglamorous	Lori McKenna	—
2008	Kellie Pickler	Kellie Pickler	—
2008	Love on the Inside	Sugarland	2× Platinum
2008	Let Me Be Your Side Track: The Influence of Jimmy Rogers	Various Artists	—
2008	Let It Go / Set This Circus Down (Compilation)	Tim McGraw	—
2008	Kellie Pickler	Kellie Pickler	—
2008	I'm Alright / Jo Dee Messina (Compilation)	Jo Dee Messina	—
2008	Goddess	Shawna Russell	—
2008	Christmas & Hits Duos	Toby Keith	—
2008	All I Want / Not Moment Too Soon	Tim McGraw	—
2009	The Man I Want to Be	Chris Young	—
2009	Southern Voice	Tim McGraw	—
2009	Gold and Green	Sugarland	—
2009	Bigger Hands	John Anderson	—
2010	Cowboy's Back in Town	Trace Adkins	—
2010	Country Strong (Original Motion Picture Soundtrack)	Gwyneth Paltrow, Tim McGraw, Faith Hill, Patty Loveless...	—
2010	Coal Miner's Daughter: A Tribute to Loretta Lynn	Loretta Lynn and Various Artists	—
2010	Classics	Jon Secada	—
2011	Wildflower	Lauren Alaina	—
2011	Town Line	Aaron Lewis	—
2011	Remember Me, Vol. 1	Willie Nelson	—
2011	Proud to Be Here	Trace Adkins	—
2011	Neon	Chris Young	Gold
2011	Looking for America	Mark Wills	—
2011	It's About Time / Ten Rounds (Compilation)	Tracy Byrd	—
2012	Seminole Wind/ Solid Ground (Compilation)	John Anderson	—
2012	New to This Town	Kix Brooks	—
2012	Emotional Traffic	Tim McGraw	—
2012	Casey James	Casey James	—
2012	5 Classic Albums	George Strait	—
2012	Two Lanes of Freedom	Tim McGraw	—
2013	Sowin' Love/ Heroes	Paul Overstreet	—
2013	Off the Beaten Path	Justin Moore	—
2013	Love Will...	Trace Adkins	—
2013	Headlights, Taillights, and Radios	Tracy Lawrence	—
2013	Cut to Impress	Maggie Rose	—
2013	Bring You Back	Brett Eldredge	Gold
2013	A.M.	Chris Young	—
2014	The Hard Way/ No Time to Kill (Compilation)	Clint Back	—
2014	Sundown Heaven Town	Tim McGraw	—
2014	Southbound	The Doobie Brothers	—
2014	Nashville Outlaws: A Tribute to Mötley Crüe	Various Artists	—
2014	4 Album Collection	Tim McGraw	—
2015	On Purpose	Clint Black	—
2015	Love Somebody	Reba McEntire	—
2015	Damn Country Music	Tim McGraw	—
2015	Buy Me a Boat	Chris Janson	—
2016	Turnin Up a Sundown	Tristan Horncastle	—
2016	Kinda Don't Care	Justin Moore	—
2016	Deep Tracks	Faith Hill	—
2016	A Whole Lot More to Me	Craig Morgan	—
2016	All Over the Map	Steve Wariner (Feat. Duane Eddy, Eric Johnson, Ricky Skaggs...)	—
