= Somebody Paints the Wall =

"Somebody Paints the Wall" is a country music song written by Tommy Smith, Charles Browder, Elroy Kahanek, and Nelson Larkin. First released in 1989 by Josh Logan from his album of the same name, it was a number 62 country hit for him that year. A second version was issued by George Jones who recorded the song as "Somebody Always Paints the Wall" on his 1990 album You Oughta Be Here with Me. then a third by Tracy Lawrence in 1992 from his album Sticks and Stones, and his version was a Top 10 country hit.

== Content ==
"Somebody Paints the Wall" is a mid-tempo in which the narrator comments on his inability to advance on given opportunities: "Seems every time I make my mark / Somebody paints the wall".

== Josh Logan version ==
"Somebody Paints the Wall"

Single by Josh Logan

from the album Somebody Paints the Wall
- Released: 1989
- Genre: Country
- Length: 3:22
- Label: Curb
- Songwriters: Tommy Smith, Charles Browder, Elroy Kahanek, Nelson Larkin
- Producers: Nelson Larkin, Ron Reynolds

Josh Logan singles chronology
"Every Time I Get to Dreamin'" (1988)	"Somebody Paints the Wall" (1989)	"I Was Born with a Broken Heart" (1989)

Josh Logan's rendition was the second single from his 1988 debut album, also titled Somebody Paints the Wall. It was released to radio in 1989, peaking at number 62 on the U.S. country charts.

=== Chart positions ===
Chart (1989)	Peak position
US Hot Country Songs (Billboard)	62

== Tracy Lawrence version ==
"Somebody Paints the Wall"

Single by Tracy Lawrence

from the album Sticks and Stones
- Released: September 28, 1992
- Genre: Country
- Length: 3:18
- Label: Atlantic
- Songwriters: Tommy Smith, Charles Browder, Elroy Kahanek, Nelson Larkin
- Producer: James Stroud

Tracy Lawrence singles chronology
"Runnin' Behind" (1992)	"Somebody Paints the Wall" (1992)	"Alibis" (1993)

Tracy Lawrence's version was the fourth and final single from his 1991 debut album Sticks and Stones. Released as a single in late 1992, his version was a number 8 country hit in the US, and number 19 in Canada.

=== Chart positions ===
"Somebody Paints the Wall" debuted at number 68 on the U.S. Billboard Hot Country Singles & Tracks for the week of October 10, 1992.

Chart (1992–1993)	Peak position
Canada Country Singles (RPM)	19
US Hot Country Songs (Billboard)	8

== Other versions ==
George Jones recorded the song as "Somebody Always Paints the Wall" on his 1990 album You Oughta Be Here with Me.
