= Ed Hill =

American country music songwriter

- Born: Edward Monroe Hill
- Origin: Hanford, California, US
- Genre: Country
- Occupation: Singer-songwriter
- Years active: 1970–present

Edward Monroe Hill (born in Hanford, California) is an American country music songwriter. Hill has been active since the early 1970s. Hill plays piano and keyboard and has backed Merle Haggard and Kris Kristofferson. Hill joined the Palomino Club's house band, the Palomino Riders, in the late 1970s, and backed artists like Marty Robbins and Willie Nelson. In 1980, he joined the Gilley's Urban Cowboy Band and won a Grammy Award for Best Country Instrumental Performance for "Orange Blossom Special/Hoedown".

In 1980 and 1982, he was nominated for an Academy of Country Music Award in the piano player category.

In late 1987, he joined New Haven Music which was sold to BMG in 1997.

He has won four Nashville Songwriters Association International Awards for "Songs I Wish Had Written". They include: It Matters To Me by Faith Hill, Georgia Rain by Trisha Yearwood, Find Out Who Your Friends Are by Tracy Lawrence and Just Fishin' by Trace Adkins.

In 2012, Hill was nominated for a Grammy Award in the Best Country Song category for Just Fishin' written with Casey Beathard and Monty Criswell.

== Singles written or co-written by Ed Hill ==
- 2018- Most People are Good - Luke Bryan
- 2011 – Just Fishin' – Trace Adkins – Broadcast Music, Inc. 1 Million-Air Award
- 2010 – I'm All About It – Randy Houser
- 2008 – Hold On To Me – Rissi Palmer
- 2008 – That's a Man- Jack Ingram
- 2007 – Spoken Like a Man – Blaine Larsen
- 2007 – Find Out Who Your Friends Are – Tracy Lawrence – Broadcast Music, Inc. 2 Million-Air Award
- 2007 – How 'bout Them Cowgirls – George Strait – Broadcast Music, Inc. 1 Million-Air Award
- 2005 – Songs About Me – Trace Adkins – Broadcast Music, Inc. 1 Million-Air Award
- 2005 – Somebody's Hero – Jamie O'Neal
- 2005 – Georgia Rain – Trisha Yearwood
- 2004 – Goes Good With Beer John Michael Montgomery
- 2004 – You Do Your Thing – Montgomery Gentry
- 2004 – I Wish – Jo Dee Messina
- 2004 – How Far – Martina McBride 1994
- 2002 – One More Time – Kenny G / Chanté Moore
- 2000 – There You Are – Martina McBride – Broadcast Music, Inc. 1 Million-Air Award
- 1999 -Whatever You Say – Martina McBride – Broadcast Music, Inc. 2 Million-Air Award
- 1999 – She's Always Right – Clay Walker
- 1998 – Buckaroo – Lee Ann Womack
- 1998 – Just Another Heartache – Chely Wright
- 1998 – Ordinary People – Clay Walker
- 1997 – One, Two, I Love You – Clay Walker
- 1997 – What If I Do- Mindy McCready
- 1996 – C-O-U-N-T-R-Y – Joe Diffie
- 1995 – The Heart Is a Lonely Hunter – Reba McEntire – Broadcast Music, Inc. 2 Million-Air Award
- 1995 – It Matters To Me – Faith Hill – Broadcast Music, Inc. 3 Million-Air Award
- 1994 – Be My Baby Tonight – John Michael Montgomery – Broadcast Music, Inc. 5 Million-Air Award
- 1992 – Runnin' Behind – Tracy Lawrence – Broadcast Music, Inc. 2 Million-Air Award
- 1991 – In a Different Light- Linda Davis
- 1989 – 'Til Love Comes Again – Reba McEntire
