= Today's Lonely Fool =

Single by Tracy Lawrence

from the album Sticks and Stones
- Released: February 3, 1992
- Recorded: 1991
- Genre: Country
- Length: 3:51
- Label: Atlantic PRCD 4348
- Songwriters: Kenny Beard; Stan Paul Davis
- Producer: James Stroud

Tracy Lawrence singles chronology
| "Sticks and Stones" (1991) | "Today's Lonely Fool" (1992) | "Runnin' Behind" (1992) |

"Today's Lonely Fool" is a song written by Kenny Beard and Stan Paul Davis, and recorded by American country music artist Tracy Lawrence. It was released in February 1992 as the second single from his debut album, Sticks and Stones. The song peaked at number 3 on the U.S. Billboard Hot Country Songs chart and number 2 on Canada's RPM country chart.

== Content ==
The song is a moderate mid-tempo song where the narrator is begging forgiveness of a woman he did wrong because he didn't trust her fidelity. He tells her that yesterday he was a jealous man but today he is just a lonely fool. The second verse is half spoken, half sang. The narrator says that if she takes him back, he will always trust her and be proud when other men notice her.

== Music video ==
The music video was directed by Marc Ball and premiered in March 1992.

== Chart performance ==
| Chart (1992) | Peak position |
|---|---|
| Canada Country Singles (RPM) | 2 |
| US Hot Country Songs (Billboard) | 3 |

=== Year-end charts ===
| Chart (1992) | Position |
|---|---|
| Canada Country Tracks (RPM) | 20 |
| US Country Songs (Billboard) | 38 |
