= Tracy Lawrence =

American musician (born 1968)

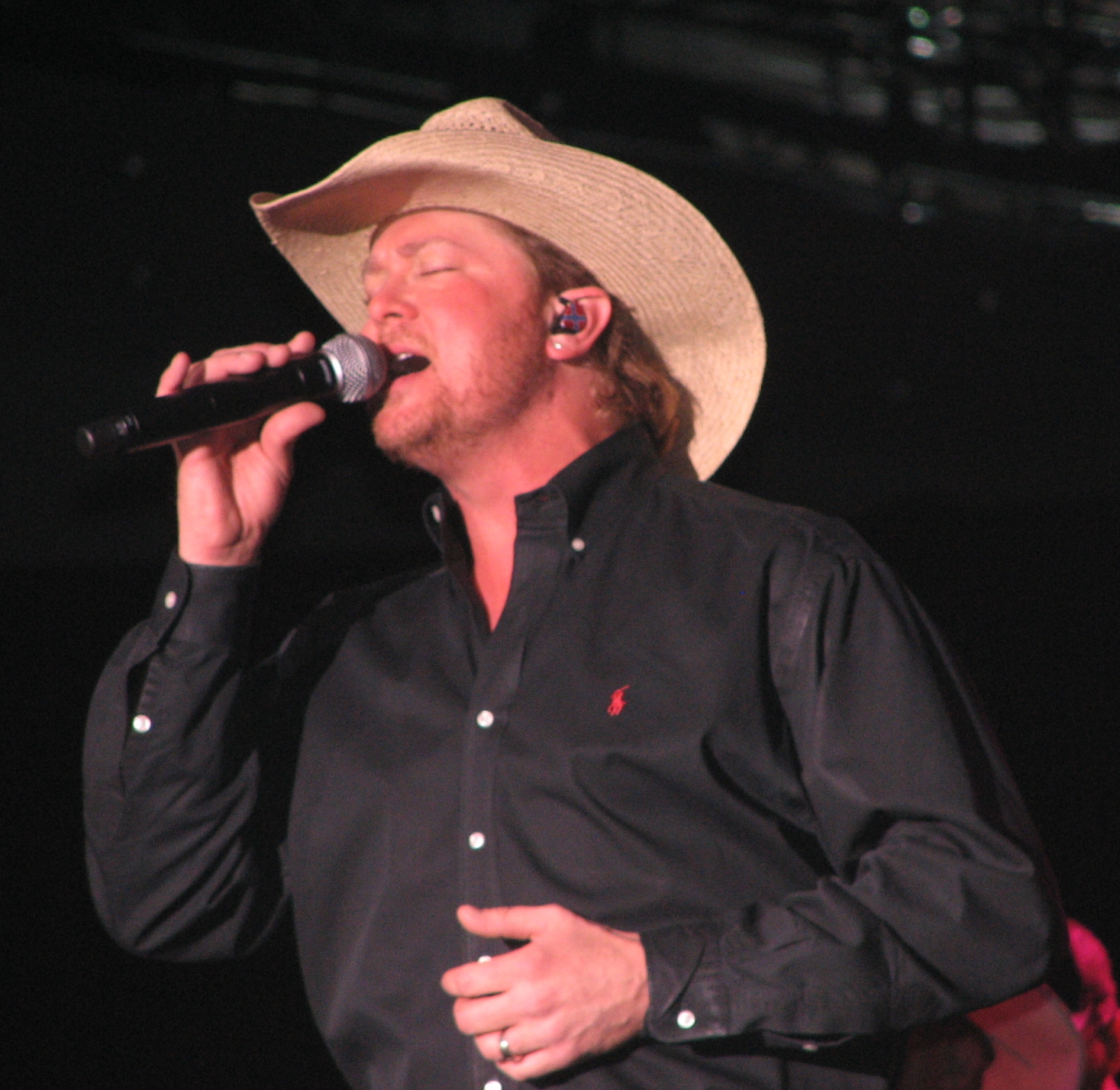
- Lawrence performing at a private concert in 2006

Background information
- Born: Tracy Lee Lawrence; January 27, 1968 (age 58); Atlanta, Texas, U.S.
- Origin: Nashville, Tennessee, U.S.
- Genres: Neotraditional country; honky tonk
- Occupations: Singer; Songwriter; Record producer
- Instrument: Vocals
- Years active: 1991–present
- Labels: Atlantic Nashville; Warner Bros. Nashville; DreamWorks Nashville; Mercury Nashville; Rocky Comfort; Lawrence Music Group
- Spouses: Frances Weatherford (m. 1993; div. 1996) Stephenie Drew (m. 1997; div. 1997) Becca Lawrence (m. 2000)
- Website: http://www.tracylawrence.com

Tracy Lee Lawrence (born January 27, 1968) is an American country music singer, songwriter, and record producer. Born in Atlanta, Texas, and raised in Foreman, Arkansas, Lawrence began performing at age 15 and moved to Nashville, Tennessee, in 1990 to begin his country music career. He signed to Atlantic Records Nashville in 1991 and made his debut later that year with the album Sticks and Stones. Five more studio albums, as well as a live album and a compilation album, followed throughout the 1990s and into 2000 on Atlantic before the label's country division was closed in 2001. Afterward, he recorded for Warner Bros. Records, DreamWorks Records, Mercury Records Nashville, and his own labels, Rocky Comfort Records and Lawrence Music Group.

Lawrence has released a total of 14 studio albums. His most commercially successful albums are Alibis (1993) and Time Marches On (1996), both certified double-platinum by the Recording Industry Association of America (RIAA). He has charted more than forty singles on the Billboard Hot Country Songs charts, including eight songs that reached the number one position: "Sticks and Stones", "Alibis", "Can't Break It to My Heart", "My Second Home", "If the Good Die Young", "Texas Tornado", "Time Marches On", and "Find Out Who Your Friends Are". Of these, "Time Marches On" is his longest-lasting at three weeks, while "Find Out Who Your Friends Are" set a record at the time for the slowest ascent to the top of that chart. His musical style is defined mainly by neotraditional country and honky-tonk influences, although he has also recorded Christmas music and Christian country music. He has won Top New Male Vocalist from Billboard in 1992 and from Academy of Country Music in 1993, and Vocal Event of the Year from the Country Music Association in 2007.

== Biography ==
Tracy Lee Lawrence was born in Atlanta, Texas, on January 27, 1968. He was raised by his stay-at-home mother JoAnn Dickens and stepfather Duane Dickens. He has two brothers and three sisters. When Lawrence was four years old, his family moved to Foreman, Arkansas. Growing up there, Lawrence sang in the local Methodist church choir and learned to play guitar. His mother had wanted him to grow up to be a minister, but he wanted to pursue a musical career instead. Regarding his upbringing, Lawrence told Country Weekly magazine in 1996, "I was hell-bent on doing things my way. I bucked my stepfather. He thought I was risking too much chasing this crazy music dream." Lawrence began performing publicly in local clubs at age 15. By age 17, he had joined a local honky-tonk band. He attended Southern Arkansas University in 1986 to study mass communications, where he also became a brother of Sigma Pi, but dropped out two years later to sing for a band based out of Louisiana. When the band broke up, Lawrence moved to Nashville, Tennessee, in 1990, supporting himself through odd jobs. He also became a regular performer at several different Nashville nightclubs and bars, and further supported himself through winning local talent competitions. After performing at an artist showcase at Nashville's Bluebird Café in January 1991, Lawrence was discovered by talent manager Wayne Edwards, who helped him sign to Atlantic Records' Nashville division. This signing took place only seven months after his move to Nashville.

== Musical career ==
=== 1991–1993: Sticks and Stones ===
After signing to Atlantic Nashville, Lawrence began recording his debut album Sticks and Stones. On May 31, 1991, after he had completed the album's vocal tracks, Lawrence was injured when walking a high school friend named Sonja Wilkerson to the door of her hotel room at a Quality Inn in downtown Nashville. He was confronted by three men who intended to rape Wilkerson and rob both of them. Lawrence resisted and was shot four times, allowing his friend to escape. Two of the wounds were major and necessitated surgery at Nashville's Vanderbilt University Medical Center, and one bullet remained embedded in his hip. The shooting and subsequent surgery also delayed the release of the album so that he would have time to recover before promoting it.

Sticks and Stones, upon its late-1991 release, accounted for four singles on the Billboard Hot Country Songs charts. First was the album's title track, which reached the number-one position on that chart in January 1992. Following it were three additional top-ten hits: "Today's Lonely Fool", "Runnin' Behind", and "Somebody Paints the Wall." The last of these was originally released by Josh Logan, whose version had made the lower regions of the same chart in 1989. Contributing songwriters to the album included John Scott Sherrill, Mark D. Sanders, Tim Menzies, Bob DiPiero, Lawrence himself, and Kenny Beard, who would go on to write many of Lawrence's other singles as well. Another cut from the album, "Paris, Tennessee", was also recorded by co-writer Dennis Robbins on his 1992 album Man with a Plan, and by Kenny Chesney on his 1995 album All I Need to Know. Musicians on the album included Bruce Bouton, Mark Casstevens, and Milton Sledge of Garth Brooks' studio band The G-Men, along with session musicians Brent Rowan and Glenn Worf. James Stroud produced the album, and played drums on the track "Between Us". Sticks and Stones was certified platinum by the Recording Industry Association of America (RIAA) for shipments of one million copies. The album received an "A−" from Entertainment Weekly, whose writer Alanna Nash said that he "pairs a poised and confident baritone with witty and well-crafted songs that shed soft light in the dark corners of the human condition." In 1992, Billboard magazine named him Top New Male Vocalist.

=== 1993–1994: Alibis ===
In 1993, Lawrence released his second album, Alibis, which earned a double-platinum RIAA certification for shipments of two million copies. All four of its singles reached the number-one position on the Hot Country Songs charts between early 1993 and early 1994: the title track, "Can't Break It to My Heart", "My Second Home", and "If the Good Die Young". The title track also accounted for his first entry on the Billboard Hot 100, reaching number 72 there. Also produced by Stroud, the album contained songs co-written by Don Schlitz, Randy Boudreaux, and Craig Wiseman. Lawrence himself co-wrote "Can't Break It to My Heart" with "Sticks and Stones" co-writer Elbert West, and "My Second Home" with Beard. Lawrence told the blog Taste of Country in 2018 that he "fought" with Atlantic executives over recording "Can't Break It to My Heart", because the label wanted him to record more ballads akin to those of then-labelmate John Michael Montgomery instead. A review of Alibis in Cash Box magazine praised the title track, "I Threw the Rest Away", and "It Only Takes One Bar (To Make a Prison)" as the strongest cuts, while noting the "conviction and authenticity" in Lawrence's voice. Nash was less positive, writing in Entertainment Weekly that Lawrence "settles for clichéd themes and mawkish delivery". Lawrence promoted the album through a tour with George Jones, and signed a deal with the Stetson hat company to advertise a new line of hats. Also in 1993, he was awarded as Top New Male Vocalist by the Academy of Country Music.

=== 1994–1995: I See It Now and Tracy Lawrence Live ===
Lawrence's 1994 album I See It Now had its title track serve as the lead single. Co-written by Larry Boone, Paul Nelson, and Woody Lee (who also recorded for Atlantic Nashville at the time), it peaked at number two on the country charts and 84 on the Hot 100. Followup "As Any Fool Can See" also went to number two on the former, while the Bobby Braddock-penned "Texas Tornado" became his sixth number-one hit on Hot Country Songs in mid-1995 and its B-side "If the World Had a Front Porch" also reached number two afterward. Also included on the album were the John Anderson duet "Hillbilly with a Heartache", previously found on Anderson's 1994 album Country 'til I Die, and the song "I Got a Feelin'", co-written by Joe Diffie and later recorded by him on his 1997 album Twice Upon a Time. I See It Now had seven of its tracks produced by Stroud, while three others accounted for Lawrence's first co-production credits: he produced "Texas Tornado" by himself, "As Any Fool Can See" with Flip Anderson of his touring band, and "Hillbilly with a Heartache" with both Flip Anderson and Stroud. Lawrence promoted I See It Now throughout 1995 with a tour consisting of over 200 shows. Nash found I See It Now superior to its predecessor, stating that Lawrence "returns to the honky-tonk sound of his debut, balancing melodic ballads of regret with kick-butt rhythms and lively wordplay." Allmusic rated the album 4 out of 5 stars, with an uncredited review praising the album's honky-tonk sound, along with the "cute lyrical twists for which country music is famous". An also uncredited review in People praised the title track and closing track "I’d Give Anything to Be Your Everything Again" as "lovely, bittersweet accounts of romance lost", but criticized the lyrics of "If the World Had a Front Porch". I See It Now received RIAA platinum certification.

Also in 1995, he released a live acoustic album, Tracy Lawrence Live. The album included live recordings of nine previous singles, plus the album track "I Threw the Rest Away" from Alibis. Lawrence compiled the album from 40 different live shows from the six months prior to the disc's release, and once again produced with Flip Anderson. The album was originally to have been titled Tracy Lawrence Live and Unplugged, but it was retitled due to MTV claiming a copyright on the term "unplugged".

=== 1995–1997: Time Marches On ===
Time Marches On, his fourth album, was released in January 1996. It became his second double-platinum album in 2000. The lead single was "If You Loved Me", a number four entry on the Hot Country Songs charts. Lawrence said of the song that "it’s a typical Tracy Lawrence ballad about love gone wrong", and that he felt that it was one of his strongest singles. Following this song was the album's title track; also written by Braddock, it became Lawrence's longest-lasting number-one single on Hot Country Songs, holding that position for three weeks. It was also nominated by the Country Music Association as Single of the Year. After this song came "Stars over Texas" (which Lawrence co-wrote with Boone) and "Is That a Tear", both peaking at number two. The album's production duties were split, with Don Cook (best known for his work with Brooks & Dunn) handling five tracks, and Lawrence and Anderson on the other five. Brian Wahlert of Country Standard Time noted that the tracks produced by Lawrence and Anderson were more traditional country in their sound than the tracks Cook produced, highlighting "Is That a Tear" and "Somewhere Between the Moon and You" as the strongest and most country-sounding cuts. Stephen Thomas Erlewine of Allmusic wrote that the album was "another crowd-pleasing set of contemporary country. Like his previous albums, the song selection is a hit-or-miss affair, with about half of the songs failing to make much of an impression. The remainder, however, proves why Lawrence is one of the most popular singers in Nashville." In 1996, Billboard ranked Lawrence as the tenth most-played radio artist in any genre that year.

=== 1997–1998: The Coast Is Clear ===
Lawrence's fifth studio album, The Coast Is Clear, was issued in March 1997 and achieved an RIAA gold certification two months later. Like its predecessor, it featured some songs produced by Cook, and others by Lawrence and Anderson. This album's first two singles "Better Man, Better Off" and "How a Cowgirl Says Goodbye" both made top five on Hot Country Songs, but the followups were less successful: the title track became his first single to miss the top 10 when it peaked at number 26, and "While You Sleep" fell outside the top 40. Tom Roland of The Tennessean noted that the album had a theme of "attempts to undo what's done", but criticized the sound as "restrained" and "middle-of-the-road". Sarah Rodman of Country Standard Time shared a similar opinion of the production, calling "While You Sleep" the "most emotive and touching song" while also referring to "How a Cowgirl Says Goodbye" as "lively". Atlantic issued a greatest-hits package, The Best of Tracy Lawrence, in 1998. This disc included thirteen previous singles and the new song "Her Old Stompin' Ground". Three years after its release, this compilation received RIAA gold certification.

=== 1999–2002: Lessons Learned and Tracy Lawrence ===
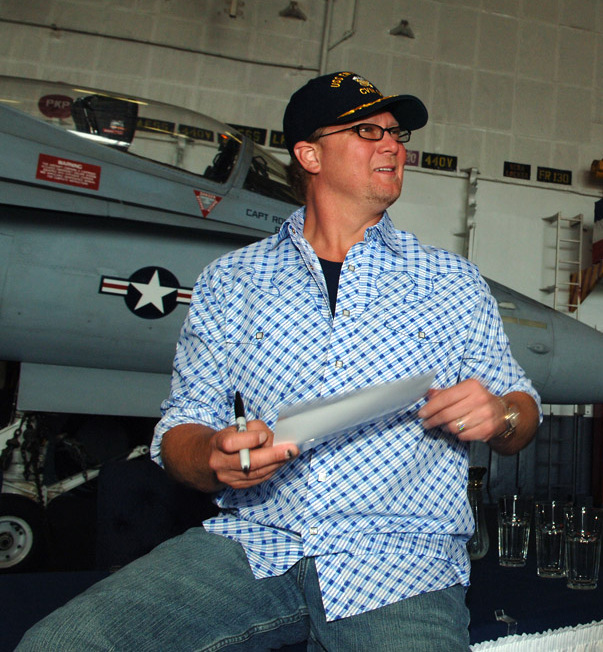
Lawrence aboard the USS Enterprise (CVN-65), May 2007

In late 1999, Lawrence returned to the charts with "Lessons Learned". This was the lead single to his 2000 album of the same name, which he and Anderson produced with audio engineer Butch Carr. The song reached number three on the country charts in 2000, and accounted for his highest Hot 100 peak of number 40. The album charted two more singles in "Lonely" and "Unforgiven". Tom Roland gave Lessons Learned three out of five stars in a review for The Tennessean, noting that Lawrence "repeatedly sings of flaws and errors and the challenges in overcoming them." Erlewine wrote of the album in Allmusic that it is "certainly pleasant, yet it tends to fade into the background". Jeffrey B. Remz of Country Standard Time thought that the album maintained a constantly country sound, and had well-written songs.

In late 2000, Atlantic Records closed its Nashville division and moved all artists, including Lawrence, to the Nashville branch of parent company Warner Bros. Records. His only release for that label, Tracy Lawrence, accounted for two low-charting singles in "Life Don't Have to Be So Hard" and "What a Memory". Lawrence and Anderson produced the album and wrote several songs on it, with other contributing writers including Michael White, Casey Beathard, Billy Yates, and frequent collaborator Larry Boone. Both Country Standard Time and Allmusic praised the album for having a more consistent and traditional sound than its predecessors, with the former's Scott Homewood calling it "quite possibly his best album", and the latter's Liana Jonas complimenting the lyrics of both singles along with the "scaled down" production. Allmusic biographer Steve Huey wrote of the album that "Despite some good reviews, it failed to halt his downward commercial momentum." Lawrence also said that he felt that the label did not invest in promotion of the album due to a lack of interest in his musical style and direction. As a result, he began seeking out new producers in an attempt to "reinvent [him]self". He considered Buddy Cannon, Byron Gallimore, and Billy Joe Walker Jr. before choosing to reunite with Stroud. The two began recording for what would have been a second album for Warner Bros. in 2002, but Lawrence was dropped from the label's roster.

=== 2003–2004: Strong ===
After being dropped from Warner Bros., Lawrence began seeking a new record deal. He had considered RCA Records Nashville, but instead chose DreamWorks Records Nashville, of which Stroud was then the president, and signed a deal with them in October 2003. His first release for the label was "Paint Me a Birmingham", which had been concurrently released by Ken Mellons on an independent label. Lawrence's version overtook Mellons's in terms of airplay, reaching number four on Hot Country Songs and number 42 on the Hot 100 in early 2004. The corresponding album, Strong, came out in 2004, and it consisted largely of material from the unreleased second project for Warner Bros. Nashville. The album's follow-up singles, "It's All How You Look at It" and "Sawdust on Her Halo", were less successful at country radio. Lawrence noted that he had writer's block when attempting to come up with material for the album, and thus sought outside writers instead of his usual collaborators. He described the title track, about a divorced woman moving on with her life, a "different than anything I've done in the past", while calling "Stones" the "most traditional" song, and noting the presence of "story songs" throughout. He also noted that the album was almost titled Stones, but was renamed to avoid confusion with his debut album Sticks and Stones.

Erlewine wrote in Allmusic that Strong "ranks among his smoothest albums, a record dominated by ballads and where up-tempo songs are as polished as the slow ones." Peter Cooper of The Tennessean thought that the album had better-written songs than its predecessors, highlighting "Paint Me a Birmingham" and "Sawdust on Her Halo" in particular, but criticizing the application of Auto-Tune to Lawrence's singing voice. Robert Woolridge of Country Standard Time thought that Lawrence's singing was stronger on the ballads such as "Paint Me a Birmingham" as opposed to the more upbeat material, but criticized the "mainstream production".

=== 2005–2006: Then and Now: The Hits Collection ===
Following the closure of DreamWorks Nashville in 2005, Lawrence transferred to Mercury Nashville that same year. There, he released the compilation Then & Now: The Hits Collection, which included fifteen of his previous hits, all of which (except "Paint Me a Birmingham") had to be newly recorded as the label did not own the rights to the original recordings made while he was on Atlantic. Two new tracks were included as well, both of which were released as singles: a cover of Mark Nesler's 1998 single "Used to the Pain", and "If I Don't Make It Back", which was co-written by Bobby Pinson. Of this compilation, Erlewine wrote, "These new versions are a little more laid-back than the originals, and they're a little slicker too. And while that doesn't necessarily suit Lawrence's voice, which has grown a little thinner over the years, that doesn't make Then and Now a bad listen."

=== 2006–2008: For the Love and All Wrapped Up in Christmas ===
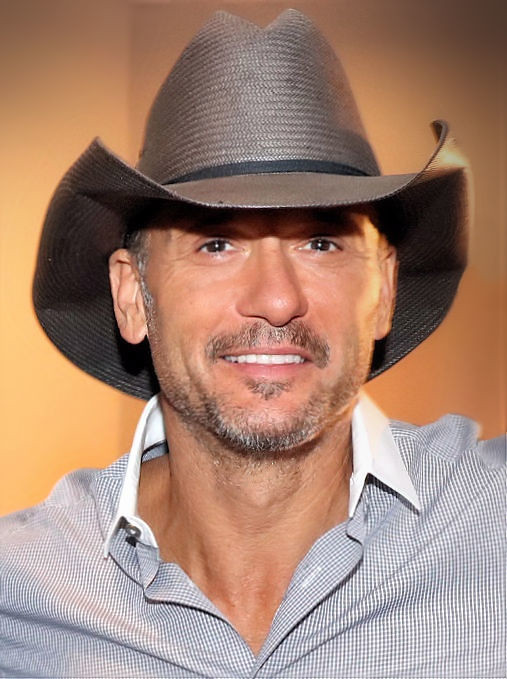
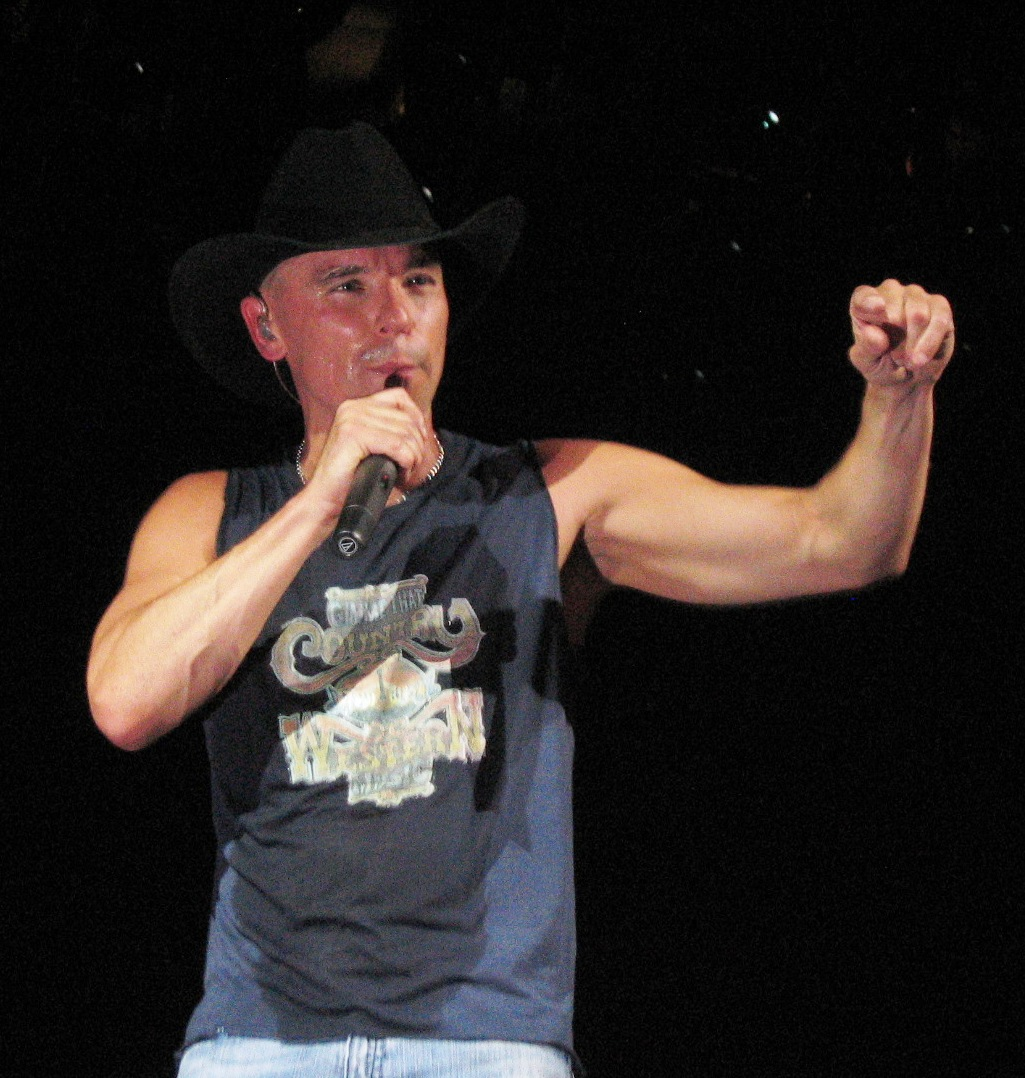
Tim McGraw (left) and Kenny Chesney (right) are featured vocalists on Lawrence's 2007 single "Find Out Who Your Friends Are".

In 2006, Lawrence started his own record label, Rocky Comfort Records, in partnership with his brother Laney. The first act signed to the label besides Lawrence himself was Chad Brock. Lawrence's first single for the label was "Find Out Who Your Friends Are", which was released in August 2006 from the studio album For the Love. The song initially lingered below the Top 40 of the Hot Country Songs charts, but following the album's release, it gained in radio interest due to the album containing as a bonus track an alternate version with Tim McGraw and Kenny Chesney on guest vocals. Thanks to the success of the alternate version, "Find Out Who Your Friends Are" became a number-one single on that chart in 2007. The song reached that position in its 41st week on the chart, setting a new record at the time for the slowest ascent to the top of the country charts, and the second-slowest on any Billboard chart. The re-recorded version received Musical Event of the Year honors at the 2007 Country Music Association (CMA) Awards, Lawrence's first award from that association, along with the Academy of Country Music (ACM) Vocal Event of the Year award. Following this song were "Til I Was a Daddy Too" and "You Can't Hide Redneck". The album's title track was a duet with Brad Arnold of the rock band 3 Doors Down, while the track "Speed of Flight" was the first song in his career that Lawrence wrote entirely by himself. Michael Sudhalter wrote in Country Standard Time that "the music on the 11-track debut matches the label's traditional-sounding name."

Later in 2007, Lawrence issued a Christmas album entitled All Wrapped Up in Christmas, the title track of which peaked at number 57 based on Christmas season airplay. In 2008, both Zona Jones and Michael Scott signed deals with Rocky Comfort. Jones released the album Prove Me Right through the label in 2009.

=== 2009–2011: The Rock and The Singer ===
Lawrence made his last Hot Country Songs chart appearance with the single "Up to Him" in early 2009. It is the first single for a studio album entitled The Rock, a Christian country album which was released in June 2009. It received 3.5 out of 5 from Country Weekly magazine, whose review noted that it "emphasizes at all turns the shared imperfections that we all strive to overcome in order to be good people". Allmusic reviewer Todd Sterling thought that Lawrence "sounds as comfortable singing songs about the Lord as he does singing straight country", calling it "a positive collection that will appeal to people of all faiths." Country Standard Time reviewer Jessica Phillips also thought that the lyrics of the album were "positive" and "uplifting", comparing the disc favorably to Randy Travis's gospel albums. The album got a 2009 Grammy Award nomination for Grammy Award for Best Southern, Country or Bluegrass Gospel Album.

Due to financial difficulties, Lawrence closed the Rocky Comfort label after The Rock and established a second personal label, Lawrence Music Group, in 2011. His first release for this label was The Singer that same year. It was initially available solely from his website and digital music distributors, a decision that Lawrence made to test the viability of online distribution instead of physical sales. The album features only acoustic instruments, and includes acoustic re-recordings of "Paint Me a Birmingham" and "Find Out Who Your Friends Are". Of the album, Lawrence said that he included more songs that he had written himself, because he felt that he had become more confident in his own songwriting skills. He also said that the album was "different" due to the increased presence of songs that he had written and the acoustic sound.

=== 2013–: Further releases on Lawrence Music Group ===
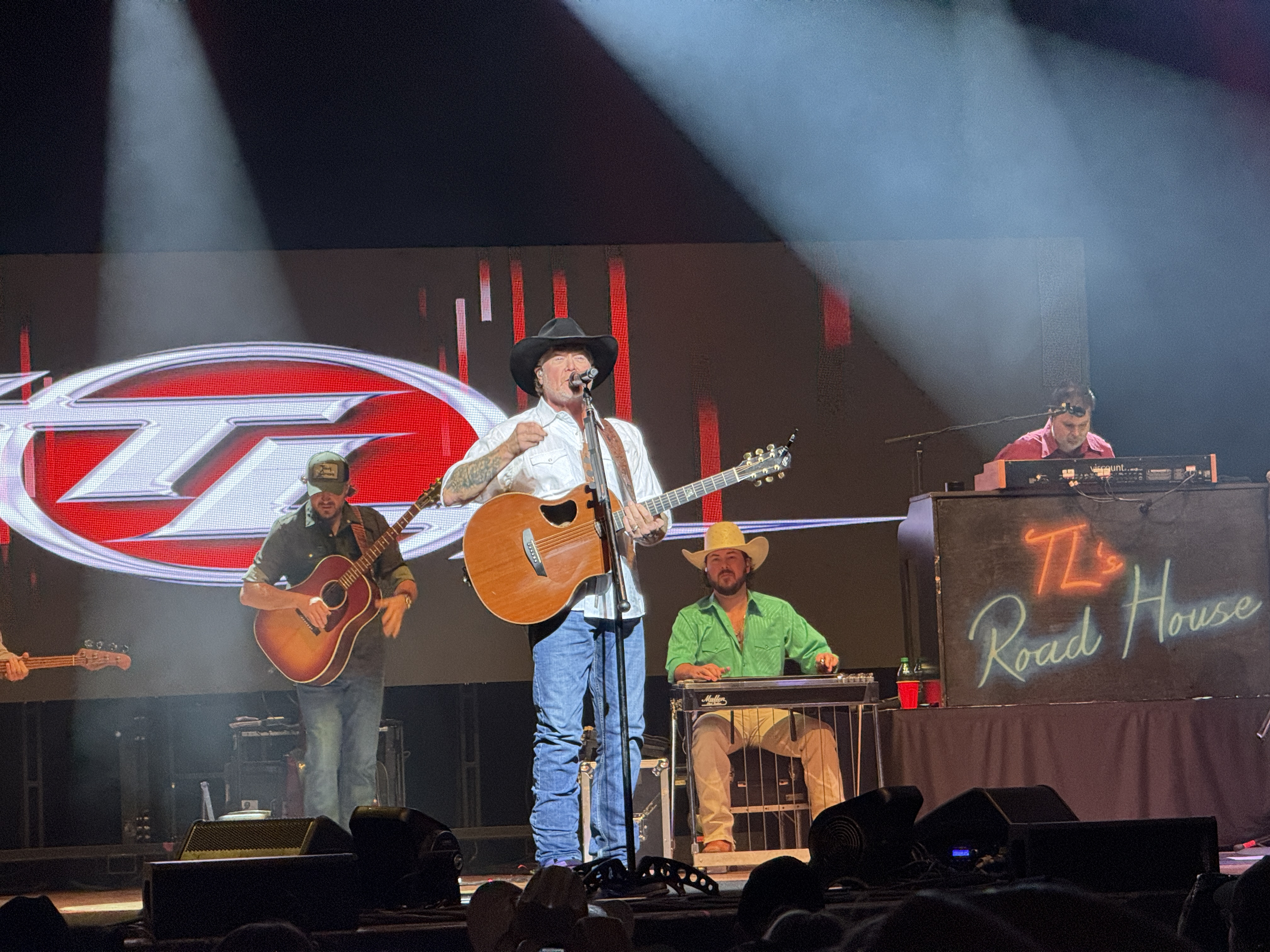
Lawrence performing in 2026

Lawrence released the single "Stop, Drop & Roll" to country radio in October 2012. It was the first single from the album Headlights, Taillights and Radios, released on August 20, 2013. Lawrence funded the album through Kickstarter. Contributing songwriters included Kurt Allison (of Jason Aldean's road band and the production team New Voice Entertainment) and Kip Moore. Erlewine noted that the album was more country pop than Lawrence's existing body of work, but stated that "he sounds comfortable, assured, and quite charming on this enjoyable record." Michael Rampa of Country Standard Time also thought that the album was more country-pop, but praised the lyrics and Lawrence's singing, saying of the content that "Lawrence is both looking back at his two decades-plus career in country music while also taking a significant step toward the future." Lawrence promoted the album through a tour of the same name, which consisted of 28 shows throughout the year 2014, beginning with a concert at the Holmes Theater in Detroit Lakes, Minnesota.

In 2017, Lawrence released Good Ole Days, a compilation album which features nine of his hit singles re-recorded as duets with other country singers, including Tim McGraw, Luke Bryan, Justin Moore, Jason Aldean, and Luke Combs. It also features two original songs: the title track, which features both Brad Arnold and Big & Rich, and the Craig Morgan duet "Finally Home", whose proceeds were donated to Operation Finally Home, an organization that assists in housing for injured soldiers. A second Christmas album, Frozen in Time, was released in October 2018. The album includes a mix of original compositions and covers of Christmas standards. In May 2019, he announced the August 2019 release of a new studio album titled Made in America, whose title track is also the lead single. He called the album "possibly the most personal album I have ever released." Lawrence co-wrote most of the album, with other songwriters including Chris Stapleton, Mark Nesler, and Carson Chamberlain.

Lawrence's next project is a three-disc album called Hindsight 2020. In February 2021, he confirmed that each of the three discs would be released throughout 2021, starting with Volume 1: Stairway to Heaven Highway to Hell on April 23. Its first single is the title track, which Lawrence co-wrote with Craig Wiseman. When completed, the three albums will include a mix of original songs and re-recordings of existing songs. The second disc in this project, Volume 2: Price of Fame, was released in August. Included on it were re-recordings of "I See It Now", "Somebody Paints the Wall", and "If the World Had a Front Porch", and duets with Montgomery Gentry member Eddie Montgomery and Tracy Byrd. The third installment, Volume 3: Angelina, was released in January 2022. The title track of the project was released as a single that same month; in addition, Lawrence stated that he would be touring in 2022 with Clay Walker, Randall King, and Alexandra Kay.

== Additional work ==
Lawrence has contributed to multiple collaborative works in his career. The first was George Jones' 1992 single "I Don't Need Your Rockin' Chair", which featured him as one of several artists performing on the song's final chorus, and received the Country Music Association Vocal Event of the Year for all artists involved. In 1994, Lawrence recorded "Renegades, Rebels, and Rogues" for the soundtrack of the film Maverick. This song was released to country radio as a single in mid-1994 after "If the Good Die Young" had peaked, and it went on to reach top 10 on Hot Country Songs. The soundtrack also featured him in a multi-artist rendition of "Amazing Grace". Later in the same year, he covered Keith Whitley's late-1989 single "I'm Over You" on Keith Whitley: A Tribute Album. In May 1996, Lawrence was one of many artists featured on the charity single "Hope: Country Music's Quest for a Cure", whose proceeds were donated to the T.J. Martell foundation for cancer research. The song made an appearance on Hot Country Songs, and received a Grammy Award nomination that year for all artists involved in the category of Best Country Collaboration with Vocals. In 1997, he recorded a cover of The Rolling Stones's "Paint It Black" on the multi-artist tribute album Stone Country: Country Artists Perform the Songs of the Rolling Stones. Lawrence also began working as a producer for other artists in 1997, including Rich McCready's 1997 album That Just About Covers It and the soundtrack to the musical The Civil War. The latter also featured him singing "I'll Never Pass This Way Again", which was issued as a single in October 1998.

== Music videos ==
Many of Lawrence's singles featured music videos that received rotation on CMT and the defunct TNN (The Nashville Network). In 1996, his videos were aired on CMT more than those of any other artist. Among his videos were several directed by Marc Ball which linked to each other through a time travel storyline, where Lawrence is transported to a different time period and scenario at the beginning of each video, and appears in clothing appropriate to the time period. The concept started with the video for "If the Good Die Young", and continued for those of "Renegades, Rebels, and Rogues", "I See It Now", "As Any Fool Can See", "Texas Tornado", "If the World Had a Front Porch", "Is That a Tear", "One Step Ahead of the Storm" (an album cut from The Coast Is Clear), and "Life Don't Have to Be So Hard".

== Musical style ==
Steve Huey wrote of Lawrence's musical style that he was "[o]ne of a number of rock-tinged honky-tonk singers who rose to fame in the early '90s" and "gained a loyal audience for his mix of modern and traditional country sounds". Erlewine described Lawrence's musical style as "polished, modern-day honky-tonk", and said that he "has never been among the most adventurous country singers and of all the post-Garth Brooks new traditionalists; he often avoids honky-tonk grit, even though he has a nice twang in his voice that would work well on rowdier material." In a review of Sticks and Stones, Alanna Nash noted that Lawrence had a physical and musical resemblance to Alan Jackson. His singing voice has also been described as a "smooth baritone" and a "warm baritone" with "effortless, emotional delivery". Lawrence cites Merle Haggard, Keith Whitley, and George Strait as his primary musical influences.

== Personal life ==
In April 1994, Lawrence was charged with reckless endangerment and possession of an unlicensed firearm after confronting and following home two teenagers on a highway in Wilson County, Tennessee. Although he was put on probation for a year, the charges were later cleared.

Lawrence has been married three times. His first wife was former rodeo star Frances Weatherford, whom he married in 1993. Weatherford was injured by broken glass and suffered a miscarriage after a gas fireplace explosion, and the two divorced in 1996. In March 1997 he married his second wife, Stephenie "Stacie" Drew, a former member of the Dallas Cowboys Cheerleaders. Their wedding included over 500 guests, along with performances by Toby Keith, Tracy Byrd, and Kenny Chesney. In October 1997, Lawrence underwent investigation after allegations that he had abused Drew following a concert at Buffalo Bill's hotel and casino in Primm, Nevada. This incident occurred one month after the couple had filed for divorce. Lawrence was convicted of a misdemeanor for battery, and was ordered by Las Vegas courts to donate $500 to a Nevada-based women's shelter. Billboard also reported that Atlantic Nashville's president had suspended Lawrence from recording any new material until he agreed to undergo counseling, but he later denied these claims. He married his third wife, Becca, in a secret wedding ceremony just after Christmas 2000. The couple had a child named Skylar the following June. Two years later, they had a second daughter, Mary Keagan.

== Discography ==
Studio albums

- Sticks and Stones (1991)
- Alibis (1993)
- I See It Now (1994)
- Time Marches On (1996)
- The Coast Is Clear (1997)
- Lessons Learned (2000)
- Tracy Lawrence (2001)
- Strong (2004)
- For the Love (2007)
- The Rock (2009)
- The Singer (2011)
- Headlights, Taillights and Radios (2013)
- Good Ole Days (2017)
- Frozen in Time (2018)
- Made in America (2019)
- Hindsight 2020 Volume 1: Stairway to Heaven Highway to Hell (2021)
- Hindsight 2020 Volume 2: Price of Fame (2021)
- Hindsight 2020 Volume 3: Angelina (2022)

Christmas albums

- All Wrapped Up in Christmas (2007)
- Frozen in Time (2018)

Compilations

- Tracy Lawrence Live (1995)
- The Best of Tracy Lawrence (1998)
- Then & Now: The Hits Collection (2005)
- The Very Best of Tracy Lawrence (2007)

=== Billboard number-one hits ===
- "Sticks and Stones" (1 week, 1992)
- "Alibis" (2 weeks, 1993)
- "Can't Break It to My Heart" (1 week, 1993)
- "My Second Home" (1 week, 1993)
- "If the Good Die Young" (2 weeks, 1994)
- "Texas Tornado" (1 week, 1995)
- "Time Marches On" (3 weeks, 1996)
- "Find Out Who Your Friends Are" (1 week, 2007)

== Awards and nominations ==
=== Grammy Awards ===
Year	Nominee / work	Award	Result
1997	"Hope: Country Music's Quest for a Cure"	Best Country Collaboration with Vocals	Nominated

=== Academy of Country Music Awards ===
Year	Nominee / work	Award	Result
1993	Tracy Lawrence	Top New Male Vocalist	Won
1994	"Can't Break It to My Heart"	Single Record of the Year	Shortlisted
1994	Tracy Lawrence	Top Male Vocalist of the Year	Shortlisted
1995	Tracy Lawrence	Top Male Vocalist of the Year	Shortlisted
1995	John Anderson and Tracy Lawrence	Top Vocal Duo of the Year	Nominated
1997	"Time Marches On"	Single Record of the Year	Nominated
1997	"Time Marches On"	Song of the Year	Nominated
1997	Time Marches On	Album of the Year	Nominated
2008	"Find Out Who Your Friends Are"	Vocal Event of the Year	Won

=== Country Music Association Awards ===
Year	Nominee / work	Award	Result
1993	Tracy Lawrence	Horizon Award	Nominated
1996	"Time Marches On"	Single of the Year	Nominated
2007	"Find Out Who Your Friends Are"	Vocal Event of the Year	Won
