= Renegades, Rebels and Rogues =

Single by Tracy Lawrence

from the album Maverick (soundtrack)
- Released: May 16, 1994
- Recorded: 1994
- Genre: Country
- Length: 2:37
- Label: Atlantic
- Songwriters: Larry Boone; Earl Clark; Paul Nelson
- Producers: Tracy Lawrence, Flip Anderson

Tracy Lawrence singles chronology
"If the Good Die Young" (1994)	"Renegades, Rebels and Rogues" (1994)	"I See It Now" (1994)

"Renegades, Rebels and Rogues" is a song written by Larry Boone, Earl Clark and Paul Nelson, and recorded by American country music artist Tracy Lawrence. It was released in May 1994 as a single from the soundtrack of the 1994 movie Maverick. It peaked at number 7 on the United States Billboard Hot Country Singles & Tracks chart and at number 5 on the Canadian RPM Country Tracks chart.

== Music video ==
The music video was directed by Marc Ball and premiered in May 1994. It is set in an Old Western theme, and begins with a clip from the video from "If the Good Die Young", with Lawrence being "leaped" from the race to the Old West. Posing as a cowboy, he intends to rescue a bank clerk, played by his then-wife Frances, from bandits who are planning to use dynamite to destroy the safe. Lawrence rescues the clerk just before the bank explodes, and Lawrence is "leaped" into the next video, "I See it Now."

This particular video was the first of many music videos Lawrence filmed in the mid 1990s (with Marc Ball directing the videos) that interpreted the television series Quantum Leap. Regarding the concept of time travel in his videos, Lawrence stated, "I'd always wanted to do a miniseries in video, but it seemed like it meant you'd be doing the same thing over and over... This way, it leaves me open to go anywhere or do anything. I can show up on a pirate ship or in outer space. I can transport anywhere and save the day!'"

The video was filmed at Old Tucson Studios in Tucson, Arizona. During the filming of the video, a wooden crate was blown away 40 feet from the explosion, landing near Lawrence. As a result, Atlantic Records, Lawrence's record company at the time, decided not to do any more explosions in his videos, citing that "it was too real." On the explosion, Lawrence said "I could feel wood and debris hitting me on the back. My wife [Frances] was tied up and gagged over my shoulder with her head pointed right toward the building, and the hair on top of her head was singed. When I put her down, we just hugged each other real tight. It scared us to death."

== Chart positions ==
"Renegades, Rebels and Rogues" debuted at number 58 on the U.S. Billboard Hot Country Singles & Tracks for the week of May 28, 1994.

Chart (1994)	Peak position
Canada Country Singles (RPM)	5
US Hot Country Songs (Billboard)	7

=== Year-end charts ===
Chart (1994)	Position
Canada Country Tracks (RPM)	73
