= Woody Lee =

American singer-songwriter

- Born: April 1, 1968 (age 56)
- Origin: Garland, Texas, United States
- Genres: Country
- Occupation: Singer-songwriter
- Instrument: Vocals
- Years active: 1994–1996
- Labels: Atlantic

Woody Lee (born April 1, 1968) is an American country music singer and songwriter. Signed to Atlantic Records in 1995, he released his debut album Get Over It that year. It produced the double-sided single "Get Over It"/"I Like the Sound of That." Before the release of his album, he co-wrote "I See It Now" for fellow labelmate Tracy Lawrence. He also wrote Shenandoah's 1995 single "Always Have, Always Will".

== Discography ==
=== Albums ===
Title	Album details
Get Over It	Release date: May 23, 1995; Label: Atlantic Records

=== Singles ===
Year	Single	Peak chart positions	Album
Year	Single	US Country	Album
1995	"Get Over It"	46	Get Over It
1995	"I Like the Sound of That'"	58	Get Over It
1995	"Salt and Water'"	—	Get Over It
"—" denotes releases that did not chart

=== Music videos ===
Year	Video	Director
1995	"Get Over It"	Martin Kahan
1995	"I Like the Sound of That"	

== Get Over It ==
Get Over It

Studio album by Woody Lee
- Released: May 23, 1995
- Genre: Country
- Length: 32:45
- Label: Atlantic Records
- Producer: Barry Beckett

Track listing

1. "I Can Do That" (Jerry Salley, Marvin Morrow) – 2:50
2. "Get Over It" (Keith Follese, Stephanie Bentley, Adrienne Follese) – 3:33
3. "I Like the Sound of That" (Steve Seskin, Andre Pessis) – 3:58
4. "Prove My Love" (Woody Lee, Larry Boone, Paul Nelson) – 3:43
5. "Lonely Needin' Lovin'" (Buddy Brock, Kenny Chesney, Donny Kees) – 3:18
6. "Salt and Water" (Jerry Vandiver) – 2:57
7. "I'm on Your Side" (Johnny MacRae, Steve Clark) – 3:47
8. "King of Pain" (Randy Boudreaux, Kim Williams, Tracy Lawrence) – 3:10
  - duet with Tracy Lawrence
9. "Hold It Right There" (Michael Huffman, Gene Dobbins, Bob Morrison) – 2:48
10. "Life in the Slow Lane" (Jess Leary, Jody Alan Sweet) – 2:48

== Chart Singles written by Woody Lee ==
The following is a list of Woody Lee compositions that were chart hits.

Year	Single Title	Recording Artist	Chart Positions		
Year	Single Title	Recording Artist	Billboard Country	Billboard Hot 100	RPM Country
1994	I See It Now co-written with Larry Boone and Paul Nelson	Tracy Lawrence	2	84	5
1996	Always Have, Always Will co-written with Larry Boone and Paul Nelson	Shenandoah	40		23
