= Sticks and Stones (Tracy Lawrence song) =

Single by Tracy Lawrence

from the album Sticks and Stones
- B-side: "Paris, TN"
- Released: October 15, 1991
- Recorded: 1991
- Genre: Country
- Length: 3:36
- Label: Atlantic 1930
- Songwriters: Roger Dillon, Elbert West
- Producer: James Stroud

Tracy Lawrence singles chronology
"Sticks and Stones" (1991)	"Today's Lonely Fool" (1992)

"Sticks and Stones" is a song written by Elbert West and Roger Dillon, and recorded by American country music artist Tracy Lawrence. It was released in October 1991 as the title track and first single from Lawrence's debut album Sticks and Stones. In January 1992, it became his first Number One and Top 10 hit on the Billboard country singles charts and on the Canadian RPM Country Tracks chart.

== Content ==
"Sticks and Stones" is a moderate up-tempo with electric guitar and fiddle backing. In it, the male narrator addresses a lover who has just broken up with him. He tells her that she can take all the possessions that she wants, even though he is so heartbroken.

According to Allmusic, the song's success was due in part to publicity that Lawrence had received after being shot in the knee and pelvis while trying to protect his girlfriend.

== Music video ==
The music video was directed by Richard Jernigan and premiered in late 1991.

== Chart positions ==
Chart (1991–1992)	Peak position
Canada Country Singles (RPM)	1
US Hot Country Songs (Billboard)	1

=== Year-end charts ===
Chart (1992)	Position
Canada Country Tracks (RPM)	32
US Country Songs (Billboard)	28
