= If the Good Die Young =

Single by Tracy Lawrence

from the album Alibis
- Released: January 24, 1994
- Recorded: 1992
- Genre: Country
- Length: 2:26
- Label: Atlantic
- Songwriters: Craig Wiseman; Paul Nelson
- Producer: James Stroud

Tracy Lawrence singles chronology
"My Second Home" (1993)	"If the Good Die Young" (1994)	"Renegades, Rebels and Rogues" (1994)

"If the Good Die Young" is a song written by Craig Wiseman and Paul Nelson, and recorded by American country music artist Tracy Lawrence. It was released in January 1994 as the fourth and last single from his album Alibis. In April of that year, it became that album's fourth consecutive Number One hit, reaching the top spot on the U.S. Billboard Hot Country Singles & Tracks chart and on the Canadian RPM Country Tracks chart.

== Content ==
The song is an up-tempo accompanied by electric guitar. It describes a rebellious male character who claims that he will "live forever if the good die young".

== Music video ==
The song's music video was filmed at Charlotte Motor Speedway and features footage of NASCAR drivers, including dedication to both Alan Kulwicki and Davey Allison who had been killed in off-track incidents in 1993. Lawrence drove a Chevrolet Lumina with his name on it in the video.

== Chart positions ==
"If the Good Die Young" debuted at number 64 on the U.S. Billboard Hot Country Singles & Tracks for the week of February 5, 1994.

Chart (1994)	Peak position
Canada Country Singles (RPM)	1
US Hot Country Songs (Billboard)	1

=== Year-end charts ===
Chart (1994)	Position
Canada Country Tracks (RPM)	17
US Country Songs (Billboard)	32
