= Alibis (song) =

Single by Tracy Lawrence

from the album Alibis
- B-side: "Somebody Paints the Wall"
- Released: February 11, 1993
- Recorded: 1992
- Genre: Country
- Length: 3:02
- Label: Atlantic 87372
- Songwriter: Randy Boudreaux
- Producer: James Stroud

Tracy Lawrence singles chronology
"Somebody Paints the Wall" (1993)	"Alibis" (1993)	"Can't Break It to My Heart" (1993)

"Alibis" is a song written by Randy Boudreaux, and recorded by American country music artist Tracy Lawrence. It was released on February 11, 1993, as the lead single and title track from his album Alibis. The song became Lawrence's second number one country hit in 1993 on the US Billboard Hot Country Singles & Tracks chart and on the Canadian RPM Country Tracks chart.

== Music video ==
The music video was directed by Marc Ball and premiered in early 1993. In the music video, Mariner High School in Cape Coral, Florida, was the school shot in the footage.

== Chart performance ==
The song debuted at number 64 on the Hot Country Singles chart dated February 20, 1993. It charted for 20 weeks on that chart, and reached number one on the chart dated May 1, 1993, staying there for two weeks.

=== Weekly charts ===
Chart (1993)	Peak position
Canada Country Singles (RPM)	1
US Billboard Hot 100	72
US Hot Country Songs (Billboard)	1

=== Year-end charts ===
Chart (1993)	Rank
Canada Country Tracks (RPM)	23
US Country Songs (Billboard)	14
