= I See It Now (song) =

Single by Tracy Lawrence

from the album I See It Now
- B-side: "God Made Woman on a Good Day"
- Released: August 29, 1994
- Genre: Country
- Length: 3:37
- Label: Atlantic 87199
- Songwriters: Larry Boone; Paul Nelson; Woody Lee
- Producer: James Stroud

Tracy Lawrence singles chronology
"Renegades, Rebels and Rogues" (1994)	"I See It Now" (1994)	"As Any Fool Can See" (1994)

"I See It Now" is a song written by Larry Boone, Paul Nelson and Woody Lee, and recorded by American country music artist Tracy Lawrence. It was released in August 1994 as the first single from his album of the same name. It peaked at number 2 on the U.S. Billboard Hot Country Singles & Tracks chart and reached number 5 on the Canadian RPM Country Tracks chart. It also peaked at number 84 on the U.S. Billboard Hot 100 chart.

== Music video ==
The music video was directed by Marc Ball, and premiered in late 1994. It begins with the bank explosion from the "Renegades, Rebels and Rogues" video, which Lawrence is "leaped" to a high-school dance, where he and his band perform the song. As the song ends, Lawrence dances with a pretty young woman on the dance floor, which is then "leaped" to the next video for "As Any Fool Can See". It was one of many music videos Lawrence had filmed in the mid 1990s (with Marc Ball as director) that interpreted the television series Quantum Leap.

== Chart performance ==
The song made its debut at number 60 on the Billboard Hot Country Singles & Tracks chart dated September 10, 1994, and charted for twenty weeks on that chart. It reached number 2 on the chart dated November 19, 1994, being held from the top spot by Mary Chapin Carpenter's "Shut Up and Kiss Me".

=== Charts ===
Chart (1994)	Peak position
Canada Country Singles (RPM)	5
US Billboard Hot 100	84
US Hot Country Songs (Billboard)	2

=== Year-end charts ===
Chart (1994)	Position
Canada Country Tracks (RPM)	92
