= Randy Boudreaux =

American songwriter

- Origin: Louisiana
- Genres: Country
- Occupation(s): Record producer Songwriter

Ronald "Randy" Boudreaux is a producer and songwriter of country music.

== Early life ==
Boudreaux grew up in Lake Charles, Louisiana and early in his career, performed in honky tonks all over Louisiana and the south. He learned songwriting from Harlan Howard.

== Career ==
Boudreaux has written more than 70 produced songs, including "Brokenheartsville" by Joe Nichols, "Goodnight Sweetheart" by David Kersh, and "Alibis" by Tracy Lawrence. He also co-wrote the song "Matthew, Mark, Luke & Earnhardt", recorded by former jockey Shane Sellers.

=== Awards ===
- Boudreaux won a GMA Dove Award for Country Album of the Year in 1997 for producing Jeff Silvey's album Little Bit of Faith.
