= Elbert West =

American singer-songwriter

- Born: Elbert Lee West; July 22, 1967; Welch, West Virginia, U.S.
- Died: May 18, 2015 (aged 47) Chattanooga, Tennessee, U.S.
- Genres: Country
- Occupation: Singer-songwriter
- Instruments: Vocals, guitar, piano
- Years active: 1990–2013
- Labels: Broken Bow

Elbert Lee West (July 22, 1967 – May 18, 2015) was an American country music artist. Initially a session songwriter in Nashville, Tennessee, West saw his first chart success in the 1990s as a co-writer on singles for country singer Tracy Lawrence, including the Number Ones "Sticks and Stones" and "Can't Break It to My Heart". West co-wrote album tracks for other artists, including tracks for Tim McGraw and John Michael Montgomery.

== Biography ==
Elbert West was born on July 22, 1967. Early in his musical career, West wrote songs for Tracy Lawrence, Tim McGraw, and John Michael Montgomery.

By 2001, he had signed to Broken Bow Records, then a newly formed independent label, and his debut album, Livin' the Life, was released that year. West co-wrote ten of the album's thirteen tracks, while others – including "(This One's Gonna) Leave a Mark", previously recorded by John Michael Montgomery – were co-written by Randy Archer and Johnny Park, formerly of the duo Archer/Park. "Diddley", which peaked at No. 56 on the Billboard Hot Country Singles & Tracks charts, was the album's lead single and West's only single to chart. "Diddley" was also made into a music video, which aired on CMT. Erik Hage of AllMusic gave the album four stars out of five, saying, "West has a big, husky baritone, a keen songwriting ability, a defiant attitude, and is a major country talent." After a falling out over a record, West left Broken Bow Records.

In 2013, West started having seizures. He died in Portland, Tennessee, on May 18, 2015, at the age of 47 from a stomach aneurysm. West is survived by his wife Tammy and their three children.

== Discography ==
=== Livin' the Life (2001) ===
Livin' the Life

Studio album by Elbert West
- Released: 2001
- Genre: Country
- Label: Broken Bow
- Producer: D. Scott Miller

==== Track listing ====
1. "Crawlin' Time" (Judy Hoffman, Elbert West) – 3:22
2. "Side of the Road" (D. Scott Miller, West) – 3:46
3. "Diddley" (Doc James Shapiro, C.B. Carter) – 2:52
4. "Neon Light" (West, Earl Clark) – 3:35
5. "(This One's Gonna) Leave a Mark" (John Michael Montgomery, David Lee, Johnny Park, West) – 3:34
6. "Unpredictable" (Miller, West) – 2:35
7. "Livin' the Life" (Randy Archer, West) – 3:33
8. "Robin Loves to Hear Me Sing" (Miller, John Ramey) – 4:21
9. "My Last Resort" (Miller) – 3:08
10. "Sinner" (Miller, West, Ken Prueitt) – 3:46
11. "Middle of the Line" (Lee, West) – 3:14
12. "Everything That He's Not" (Miller, West, Stewart Harris) – 5:23
13. "Kiss My Lips Goodbye" (Miller, West, Even Stevens) – 2:57

=== Personnel ===
- Steve Brewster – drums, percussion
- Gary Burnette – six-string bass guitar, electric guitar, mandolin
- John Cowan – background vocals
- Steve Mackey – bass guitar, tic tac bass
- Russ Pahl – six-string bass guitar, banjo, Dobro, acoustic guitar, electric guitar, steel guitar, gut string guitar, sitar, talk box guitar, tic tac bass
- James Pennebaker – fiddle, electric guitar, steel guitar
- Laura Vida – background vocals
- Barry Walsh – piano
- Elbert West – lead vocals

=== Singles ===
Year	Single	Peak positions	Album
Year	Single	US Country	Album
2001	"Diddley"	56	Livin' the Life
2001	"Unpredictable"	—	Livin' the Life
2002	"(This One's Gonna) Leave a Mark"	—	Livin' the Life
2004	"A Beautiful Day for Goodbye"	—	singles only
2004	"Kimberly Cooper's Eyes"	—	singles only
"—" denotes releases that did not chart

=== Music videos ===
Year	Video	Director
2001	"Diddley"	
2001	"Unpredictable"	Michael Merriman
