= 1995 in country music =

This is a list of notable events in country music that took place in the year 1995.

== Events ==
- February - Western Flyer releases "Cherokee Highway", a song against interracial violence. While the song does not chart, Martin Luther King Jr.'s widow Coretta Scott King invites the band to perform at his birthday celebration in Atlanta, Georgia.
- June - Ty Herndon is arrested for indecent exposure in Fort Worth, Texas, by an undercover police officer.
- December 31: Great American Country is launched by the Jones Radio Network. With a heavy emphasis on country music videos, the network is the first major rival to CMT.

== Top hits of the year ==
=== Singles released by American artists ===
US	CAN	Single	Artist	Reference
3	2	Adalida	George Strait	
8	8	All I Need to Know	Kenny Chesney	
49	20	All That Heaven Will Allow	The Mavericks	
4	6	Amy's Back in Austin	Little Texas	
2	1	And Still	Reba McEntire	
2	18	As Any Fool Can See	Tracy Lawrence	
4	12	Back in Your Arms Again	Lorrie Morgan	
3	28	Bend It Until It Breaks	John Anderson	
11	3	Between an Old Memory and Me	Travis Tritt	
15	10	Big Ol' Truck	Toby Keith	
6	6	Bobbie Ann Mason	Rick Trevino	
7	2	The Box	Randy Travis	
16	12	Bubba Hyde	Diamond Rio	
26	14	Cain's Blood	4 Runner	
2	4	Can't Be Really Gone	Tim McGraw	
3	3	The Car	Jeff Carson	
1	1	Check Yes or No	George Strait	
20	37	Clown in Your Rodeo	Kathy Mattea	
4	7	Darned If I Don't (Danged If I Do)	Shenandoah	
5	3	Doctor Time	Rick Trevino	
10	12	Don't Stop	Wade Hayes	
10	10	Down in Flames	BlackHawk	
23	7	Down in Tennessee	Mark Chesnutt	
1	9	Dust on the Bottle	David Lee Murphy	
13	20	Faith in Me, Faith in You	Doug Stone	
6	6	Fall in Love	Kenny Chesney	
23	2	The Fever	Garth Brooks	
19	23	Finish What We Started	Diamond Rio	
5	4	The First Step	Tracy Byrd	
3	8	For a Change	Neal McCoy	
3	3	Give Me One More Shot	Alabama	
14	7	Go Rest High on That Mountain	Vince Gill	
2	2	Goin' Through the Big D	Mark Chesnutt	
1	2	Gone Country	Alan Jackson	
1	2	Gonna Get a Life	Mark Chesnutt	
6	16	Halfway Down	Patty Loveless	
13	9	Hard Lovin' Woman	Mark Collie	
1	1	The Heart Is a Lonely Hunter	Reba McEntire	
51	18	A Heart with 4 Wheel Drive	4 Runner	
24	20	Heaven Bound (I'm Ready)	Shenandoah	
22	4	Here Comes the Rain	The Mavericks	
4	11	Here I Am	Patty Loveless	
1	3	I Can Love You Like That	John Michael Montgomery	
1	12	I Didn't Know My Own Strength	Lorrie Morgan	
4	8	I Don't Believe in Goodbye	Sawyer Brown	
1	4	I Don't Even Know Your Name	Alan Jackson	
15	9	I Got It Honest	Aaron Tippin	
2	2	I Let Her Lie	Daryle Singletary	
1	1	I Like It, I Love It	Tim McGraw	
4	4	I Think About It All the Time	John Berry	
9	25	I Wanna Go Too Far	Trisha Yearwood	
7	9	I Want My Goodbye Back	Ty Herndon	
16	20	I Was Blown Away	Pam Tillis	
15	22	I Will Always Love You	Dolly Parton & Vince Gill	
7	3	I'll Never Forgive My Heart	Brooks & Dunn	
2	1	I'm Not Strong Enough to Say No	BlackHawk	
4	6	I'm Still Dancin' with You	Wade Hayes	
25	11	If I Had Any Pride Left at All	John Berry	
16	16	If I Was a Drinkin' Man	Neal McCoy	
4	4	If I Were You	Collin Raye	
2	7	If the World Had a Front Porch	Tracy Lawrence	
18	15	If You're Gonna Walk, I'm Gonna Crawl	Sammy Kershaw	
3	7	In Between Dances	Pam Tillis	
4	3	In Pictures	Alabama	
2	5	The Keeper of the Stars	Tracy Byrd	
7	8	Lead On	George Strait	
5	9	Let's Go to Vegas	Faith Hill	
4	1	Life Gets Away	Clint Black	
5	4	Life Goes On	Little Texas	
9	6	Lipstick Promises	George Ducas	
2	2	A Little Bit of You	Lee Roy Parnell	
7	20	Little Houses	Doug Stone	
1	1	Little Miss Honky Tonk	Brooks & Dunn	
24	12	Look at Me Now	Bryan White	
11	14	Look What Followed Me Home	David Ball	
9	13	Love Lessons	Tracy Byrd	
1	1	Mi Vida Loca (My Crazy Life)	Pam Tillis	
15	11	Mississippi Moon	John Anderson	
16	6	My Heart Will Never Know	Clay Walker	
1	24	My Kind of Girl	Collin Raye	
9	6	Night Is Fallin' in My Heart	Diamond Rio	
3	2	No Man's Land	John Michael Montgomery	
1	1	Not a Moment Too Soon	Tim McGraw	
1	2	Not on Your Love	Jeff Carson	
20	20	Nothing	Dwight Yoakam	
1	1	Old Enough to Know Better	Wade Hayes	
20	22	On My Own	Reba McEntire	
2	4	One Boy, One Girl	Collin Raye	
2	1	One Emotion	Clint Black	
6	7	Party Crowd	David Lee Murphy	
5	3	Refried Dreams	Tim McGraw	
4	38	Safe in the Arms of Love	Martina McBride	
2	1	She Ain't Your Ordinary Girl	Alabama	
1	1	She's Every Woman	Garth Brooks	
3	2	Should've Asked Her Faster	Ty England	
2	1	So Help Me Girl	Joe Diffie	
1	1	Sold (The Grundy County Auction Incident)	John Michael Montgomery	
1	5	Someone Else's Star	Bryan White	
7	6	Sometimes She Forgets	Travis Tritt	
7	7	Somewhere in the Vicinity of the Heart	Shenandoah/Alison Krauss	
6	11	Song for the Life	Alan Jackson	
27	17	Southbound	Sammy Kershaw	
27	18	Southern Grace	Little Texas	
2	6	Standing on the Edge of Goodbye	John Berry	
8	10	Stay Forever	Hal Ketchum	
33	16	Storm in the Heartland	Billy Ray Cyrus	
1	1	Summer's Comin'	Clint Black	
1	1	Tall, Tall Trees	Alan Jackson	
2	3	Tell Me I Was Dreaming	Travis Tritt	
6	2	Tender When I Want to Be	Mary Chapin Carpenter	
8	11	Tequila Talkin'	Lonestar	
1	1	Texas Tornado	Tracy Lawrence	
3	7	That Ain't My Truck	Rhett Akins	
1	10	That's as Close as I'll Get to Loving You	Aaron Tippin	
10	18	That's How You Know (When You're in Love)	Lari White	
7	9	That's Just About Right	BlackHawk	
3	8	They're Playin' Our Song	Neal McCoy	
1	4	Thinkin' About You	Trisha Yearwood	
5	1	This Is Me	Randy Travis	
6	10	This Is Me Missing You	James House	
11	5	(This Thing Called) Wantin' and Havin' It All	Sawyer Brown	
2	5	This Time	Sawyer Brown	
1	2	This Woman and This Man	Clay Walker	
2	6	Till You Love Me	Reba McEntire	
18	19	Trouble	Mark Chesnutt	
10	10	Upstairs Downtown	Toby Keith	
15	11	Walking to Jerusalem	Tracy Byrd	
1	1	What Mattered Most	Ty Herndon	
16	26	What'll You Do About Me	Doug Supernaw	
24	17	When and Where	Confederate Railroad	
3	7	When You Say Nothing at All	Alison Krauss & Union Station	
3	4	Wherever You Go	Clint Black	
4	3	Which Bridge to Cross (Which Bridge to Burn)	Vince Gill	
5	3	Whiskey Under the Bridge	Brooks & Dunn	
2	2	Who Needs You Baby	Clay Walker	
2	3	You Ain't Much Fun	Toby Keith	
4	1	You and Only You	John Berry	
2	2	You Better Think Twice	Vince Gill	
1	2	You Can't Make a Heart Love Somebody	George Strait	
5	17	You Don't Even Know Who I Am	Patty Loveless	
4	8	You Have the Right to Remain Silent	Perfect Stranger	
1	1	You're Gonna Miss Me When I'm Gone	Brooks & Dunn	

=== Singles released by Canadian artists ===
US	CAN	Single	Artist	Reference
1	1	Any Man of Mine	Shania Twain	
—	20	Better Off Blue	Rena Gaile	
3	3	Better Things to Do	Terri Clark	
—	7	Black-Eyed Susan	Prairie Oyster	
—	1	Bringing Back Your Love	One Horse Blue	
—	15	Broken String of Pearls	Prescott-Brown	
—	6	Chevy Coupe	Jim Witter	
—	1	Don't Cry Little Angel	Prairie Oyster	
—	15	Family Love	Farmer's Daughter	
—	1	First Comes Love	George Fox	
—	10	The Girl Is on a Roll Tonight	Terry Kelly	
—	4	Head Over Heels	Blue Rodeo	
—	19	Hina Na Ho (Celebration)	Susan Aglukark	
—	1	Hopeless Love	One Horse Blue	
—	1	(I Do It) For the Money	Charlie Major	
—	8	I Don't Wanna Be the One	Patricia Conroy	
—	9	I Really Dug Myself a Hole	The Goods	
—	1	I'm Here	Charlie Major	
—	1	Learning a Lot About Love	Jason McCoy	
—	9	Life Is Just a Dream	Joel Feeney	
—	16	Light in My Life	The Johner Brothers with Lisa Brokop	
—	20	Listen to the Radio	Rebecca Miller	
—	18	Missing You	Calvin Wiggett	
—	1	O Siem	Susan Aglukark	
—	1	Only One Moon	Prairie Oyster	
—	20	Radioland	South Mountain	
—	18	Roy Orbison Came On	Ron Hynes	
—	4	Safe in the Arms of Love	Michelle Wright	
—	18	Starting Right Now	The Johner Brothers	
—	18	This Old Guitar	Jim Matt	
—	1	This Used to Be Our Town	Jason McCoy	
—	10	Time of My Life	George Fox	
—	16	Two Broken Hearted Fools	Rick Tippe	
—	19	Walkin' That Line	Tineta	
—	4	The Wall	Michelle Wright	
—	1	What Else Can I Do	Patricia Conroy	
—	1	What's Holding Me	George Fox	
—	1	What Kind of Man	Joel Feeney	
11	1	Whose Bed Have Your Boots Been Under?	Shania Twain	
14	1	The Woman in Me (Needs the Man in You)	Shania Twain	
—	5	You Can't Resist It	Patricia Conroy	
—	14	You Feel the Same Way Too	The Rankin Family	

== Top new album releases ==
US	CAN	Album	Artist	Record label
27	7	4 Runner	4 Runner	Polydor Nashville
1	1	All I Want	Tim McGraw	Curb
25	21	All of This Love	Pam Tillis	Arista Nashville
13	5	Come Together: America Salutes The Beatles	Various Artists	Liberty
	3	Country Heat 5	Various Artists	RCA
8	4	Dwight Live	Dwight Yoakam	Reprise
	6	Endless Seasons	The Rankin Family	EMI
1	1	Fresh Horses	Garth Brooks	Liberty
2	6	Games Rednecks Play	Jeff Foxworthy	Warner Bros.
5	5	Gone	Dwight Yoakam	Reprise
17		Greatest Hits	Little Texas	Warner Bros.
5	6	Greatest Hits	Lorrie Morgan	BNA
5	7	Greatest Hits 1990–1995	Sawyer Brown	Curb
3	17	Greatest Hits: From the Beginning	Travis Tritt	Warner Bros.
1	1	The Greatest Hits Collection	Alan Jackson	Arista Nashville
	22	Gypsies & Lovers	The Irish Descendants	Warner
12		Have Yourself a Tractors Christmas	The Tractors	Arista Nashville
19		The Hits Chapter 1	Sammy Kershaw	Mercury/PolyGram
14		Hog Wild	Hank Williams, Jr.	Curb/Warner Bros.
10		Hypnotize the Moon	Clay Walker	Giant
5	13	I Think About You	Collin Raye	Epic
12	10	In Pictures	Alabama	RCA Nashville
4	2	It Matters to Me	Faith Hill	Warner Bros.
	2	Jason McCoy	Jason McCoy	MCA
22	4	Jeff Carson	Jeff Carson	Curb
1	1	John Michael Montgomery	John Michael Montgomery	Atlantic
	8	Kickin' Country 3	Various Artists	Sony
13		Life Is Good	Emilio Navaira	Capitol Nashville
28	14	Life's So Funny	Joe Diffie	Epic
65	18	Little Acts of Treason	Carlene Carter	Giant
11	2	Lonestar	Lonestar	BNA
	5	Long Gone to the Yukon	Stompin' Tom Connors	EMI
25		Looking for Christmas	Clint Black	RCA Nashville
17		Looking for the Light	Rick Trevino	Columbia
6	15	Love Lessons	Tracy Byrd	MCA Nashville
	4	Lucky Man	Charlie Major	Arista
	14	Made for Each Other	Calvin Wiggett	Royalty
24		Mr. Christmas	Joe Diffie	Epic
9	3	Music for All Occasions	The Mavericks	MCA Nashville
13	12	NASCAR: Runnin' Wide Open	Various Artists	Columbia
	1	New Country 2	Various Artists	Warner
2	1	Now That I've Found You: A Collection	Alison Krauss	Rounder
	18	Nowhere to Here	Blue Rodeo	Warner
21		O Holy Night	John Berry	Capitol Nashville
19		Old Enough to Know Better	Wade Hayes	Columbia
12	23	One	George Jones & Tammy Wynette	MCA Nashville
10	2	Out with a Bang	David Lee Murphy	MCA Nashville
19		The Redneck Test Volume 43	Jeff Foxworthy	Laughing Hyena
42	10	The Road Goes on Forever	The Highwaymen	Columbia
10	7	Something Special	Dolly Parton	Columbia
3	3	Souvenirs	Vince Gill	MCA Nashville
12	9	Standing on the Edge	John Berry	Patriot/Liberty
1	1	Starting Over	Reba McEntire	MCA Nashville
9	7	Strait Out of the Box	George Strait	MCA Nashville
4	5	Strong Enough	BlackHawk	Arista Nashville
13	2	Terri Clark	Terri Clark	Mercury/PolyGram
3	18	Thinkin' About You	Trisha Yearwood	MCA Nashville
	1	This Child	Susan Aglukark	EMI
10		This Thing Called Wantin' and Havin' It All	Sawyer Brown	Curb
45	23	A Thousand Memories	Rhett Akins	Decca Nashville
	4	Time of My Life	George Fox	Warner
12		Tool Box	Aaron Tippin	RCA Nashville
24	10	Tracy Lawrence Live and Unplugged	Tracy Lawrence	Atlantic
13	30	Ty England	Ty England	RCA Nashville
	4	Untamed and True 2	Various Artists	MCA
9	3	What Mattered Most	Ty Herndon	Epic
	3	The Wheel Keeps on Rollin'	Asleep at the Wheel	Capitol Nashville
21		When and Where	Confederate Railroad	Atlantic
17	4	Wild Angels	Martina McBride	RCA Nashville
24	11	Wings	Mark Chesnutt	Decca Nashville
1	1	The Woman in Me	Shania Twain	Mercury/PolyGram
	19	Work of the Heart	Quartette	Denon
10		You Gotta Love That	Neal McCoy	Atlantic
7	13	You Have the Right to Remain Silent	Perfect Stranger	Curb

=== Other top albums ===
US	CAN	Album	Artist	Record label
39		All I Need to Know	Kenny Chesney	BNA
41	27	Amazing Grace: A Country Salute to Gospel	Various Artists	Sparrow
43		Any Way the Wind Blows	Brother Phelps	Asylum
73		Born That Way	Boy Howdy	Curb
69		Country Dance Super Hits	Various Artists	K-Tel
44		Daryle Singletary	Daryle Singletary	Giant
48		Days Gone By	James House	Epic
45		Faith in Me, Faith in You	Doug Stone	Epic
28		Fire to Fire	Tanya Tucker	Liberty
	36	A Gene MacLellan Tribute	John Gracie	Atlantica
57		George Ducas	George Ducas	Liberty
61		Heart and Soul	Elvis Presley	RCA
48		Junior High	Junior Brown	Curb
72		Kim Richey	Kim Richey	Mercury/PolyGram
61		Labor of Love	Radney Foster	Arista Nashville
68		Letter to Laredo	Joe Ely	MCA Nashville
37		The Marty Party Hit Pack	Marty Stuart	MCA Nashville
44		The Moffatts	The Moffatts	Polydor Nashville
27		The Original Volume 79	Jeff Foxworthy	Laughing Hyena
72		Restless	Shelby Lynne	Magnatone
35		Sold Out Volume 80	Jeff Foxworthy	Laughing Hyena
54		Super Hits	Roy Orbison	Columbia
64		Super Hits	Ricky Van Shelton	Columbia
	26	Ten More Miles	The Johner Brothers	Warner
66		Today's Pure Country	Various Artists	K-Tel
63		Today's Sizzlin' Country	Various Artists	K-Tel
	37	Under the Big Sky	Hemingway Corner	Epic
26		We All Get Lucky Sometimes	Lee Roy Parnell	Career

== Births ==
- July 7 — Taylor Kerr, member of Maddie & Tae.
- August 8 – John Morgan, 2020s singer-songwriter ("Friends Like That", "Kid Myself").
- August 11 – Priscilla Block, 2020s country singer-songwriter ("Just About Over You").
- September 18 — Maddie Font, member of Maddie & Tae.

== Deaths ==
- May 25 – Dick Curless, 63, best known for his hit "A Tombstone Every Mile" (stomach cancer)
- July 25 — Charlie Rich, 62, Grammy Award winning singer and songwriter ("Behind Closed Doors", The Most Beautiful Girl") (pulmonary embolism)
- November 10 — Curly Fox, 85, fiddler and one half of country-comedy duo Curly Fox and Texas Ruby.

== Hall of Fame inductees ==
=== Bluegrass Music Hall of Fame inductees ===
- Jimmy Martin

=== Country Music Hall of Fame inductees ===
- Roger Miller (1936–1992)
- Jo Walker-Meador (born 1924)

=== Canadian Country Music Hall of Fame inductees ===
- Gene MacLellan
- Stan Klees

== Major awards ==
=== Grammy Awards ===
- Best Female Country Vocal Performance — "Baby, Now That I've Found You", Alison Krauss
- Best Male Country Vocal Performance — "Go Rest High on That Mountain", Vince Gill
- Best Country Performance by a Duo or Group with Vocal — "Here Comes the Rain", The Mavericks
- Best Country Collaboration with Vocals — "Somewhere in the Vicinity of the Heart", Shenandoah and Alison Krauss
- Best Country Instrumental Performance — "Hightower," Asleep at the Wheel, Béla Fleck and Johnny Gimble
- Best Country Song — "Go Rest High on That Mountain", Vince Gill
- Best Country Album — The Woman in Me, Shania Twain (Producer: Robert John "Mutt" Lange)
- Best Bluegrass Album — Unleashed, The Nashville Bluegrass Band

=== Juno Awards ===
- Country Male Vocalist of the Year — Charlie Major
- Country Female Vocalist of the Year — Shania Twain
- Country Group or Duo of the Year — Prairie Oyster

=== Academy of Country Music ===
- Entertainer of the Year — Brooks & Dunn
- Song of the Year — "The Keeper of the Stars", Dickey Lee, Karen Staley, Danny Mayo (Performer: Tracy Byrd)
- Single of the Year — "Check Yes or No", George Strait
- Album of the Year — The Woman in Me (Shania Twain)
- Top Male Vocalist — Alan Jackson
- Top Female Vocalist — Patty Loveless
- Top Vocal Duo — Brooks & Dunn
- Top Vocal Group — The Mavericks
- Top New Male Vocalist — Bryan White
- Top New Female Vocalist — Shania Twain
- Top New Vocal Duo or Group — Lonestar
- Video of the Year — "The Car" – Jeff Carson (Director: Michael Salomon)

=== ARIA Awards ===
(presented in Sydney on October 20, 1995)

- Best Country Album - Beyond the Dancing (Troy Cassar-Daley)

=== Canadian Country Music Association ===
- Bud Country Fans' Choice Award — Michelle Wright
- Male Artist of the Year — Charlie Major
- Female Artist of the Year — Shania Twain
- Group or Duo of the Year — Prairie Oyster
- SOCAN Song of the Year — "Whose Bed Have Your Boots Been Under?", Shania Twain
- Single of the Year — "Any Man of Mine", Shania Twain
- Album of the Year — The Woman in Me, Shania Twain
- Top Selling Album — The Hits, Garth Brooks
- Video of the Year — "Any Man of Mine", Shania Twain
- Vista Rising Star Award — Farmer's Daughter
- Vocal Collaboration of the Year — Jim Witter and Cassandra Vasik

=== Country Music Association ===
- Entertainer of the Year — Alan Jackson
- Song of the Year — "Independence Day", Gretchen Peters (Performer: Martina McBride)
- Single of the Year — "When You Say Nothing at All", Alison Krauss & Union Station
- Album of the Year — When Fallen Angels Fly, Patty Loveless
- Male Vocalist of the Year — Vince Gill
- Female Vocalist of the Year — Alison Krauss
- Vocal Duo of the Year — Brooks & Dunn
- Vocal Group of the Year — The Mavericks
- Horizon Award — Alison Krauss
- Music Video of the Year — "Baby Likes to Rock It", The Tractors (Director: Michael Salomon)
- Vocal Event of the Year — "Somewhere in the Vicinity of the Heart", Shenandoah and Alison Krauss
- Musician of the Year — Mark O'Connor

=== RPM Big Country Awards ===
- Canadian Country Artist of the Year — Charlie Major
- Best Country Album — Only One Moon, Prairie Oyster
- Best Country Single — "Such a Lonely One", Prairie Oyster
- Male Artist of the Year — Charlie Major
- Female Artist of the Year — Michelle Wright
- Group of the Year — Prairie Oyster
- Outstanding New Artist — Shania Twain
- Top Country Composer(s) — Jim Witter and Johnny Douglas

=== Hollywood Walk of Fame ===
Stars who were honored in 1995

Garth Brooks

== Other links ==
- Country Music Association
- Inductees of the Country Music Hall of Fame
