= John Berry (country singer) discography =

American country music singer

John Berry discography
- Studio albums: 10
- Live albums: 2
- Compilation albums: 2
- Singles: 22
- Music videos: 14
- No. 1 Singles: 2

John Berry is an American country music singer. His discography consists of 10 studio albums and 22 singles. Berry reached number one on the Hot Country Songs charts in 1994 with "Your Love Amazes Me", and has six other top 10 hits on the same chart.

== Studio albums ==
=== 1980s ===
Title	Details
Things Are Not the Same	Release date: 1986; Label: Clear Sky Records

=== 1990s ===
Title	Details	Peak chart positions				Certifications (sales threshold)
Title	Details	US Country	US	CAN Country	CAN	Certifications (sales threshold)
John Berry	Release date: June 7, 1993; Label: Liberty Records; Formats: CD, cassette	13	85	1	—	CAN: Platinum; US: Platinum
Standing on the Edge	Release date: March 7, 1995; Label: Patriot Records; Formats: CD, cassette	12	69	9	48	CAN: Gold; US: Gold
Faces	Release date: September 17, 1996; Label: Capitol Nashville; Formats: CD, cassette	9	83	9	—	US: Gold
Wildest Dreams	Release date: September 28, 1999; Label: Lyric Street Records; Formats: CD, cassette	43	—	12	—	
"—" denotes releases that did not chart

=== 2000s ===
Title	Details	Peak positions
Title	Details	US Country
All the Way to There	Release date: October 16, 2001; Label: Ark 21 Records; Formats: CD	65
I Give My Heart	Release date: January 27, 2004; Label: Clear Sky Records; Formats: CD, music download	70
Those Were the Days	Release date: 2008; Label: Clear Sky Records; Formats: CD, music download	—
"—" denotes releases that did not chart

=== 2010s ===
Title	Details
Real Man. Real Life. Real God.	Release date: January 23, 2012; Label: Daywind Records; Formats: CD, music download
What I Love the Most	Release date: June 3, 2016; Label: Mansion Entertainment; Formats: CD, music download

=== 2020s ===
Title	Details
Find My Joy	Release date: March 25, 2022; Label: Gaither Music Group; Formats: CD, music download

== Holiday albums ==
Title	Details	Peak chart positions	
Title	Details	US Country	US
O Holy Night	Release date: September 26, 1995; Label: Patriot Records; Formats: CD, cassette	21	110
My Heart Is Bethlehem	Release date: October 17, 2000; Label: Ark 21 Records; Formats: CD, cassette	62	—
Christmas Live	Release date: 2002; Label: Capitol Nashville; Formats: CD	—	—
O Holy Night Live	Release date: November 18, 2003; Label: Clear Sky Records; Formats: CD	—	—
Celebrate This Christmas	Release date: September 8, 2008; Label: Clear Sky Records; Formats: Digital	—	—
John Berry Christmas	Release date: November 18, 2016; Label: Mansion; Formats: CD, Digital	—	—
"—" denotes releases that did not chart

== Compilation albums ==
Title	Details	Peak positions
Title	Details	US Country
Greatest Hits	Release date: March 28, 2000; Label: Capitol Nashville; Formats: CD, cassette	43
Certified Hits	Release date: September 24, 2002; Label: Capitol Nashville; Formats: CD	—
"—" denotes releases that did not chart

== Independent albums ==
The following albums were originally released independently and re-issued by Patriot Records in 1994.

Title	Details
Saddle the Wind	Release date: November 15, 1994; Label: Patriot Records; Formats: CD, cassette
Things Are the Not the Same	Release date: November 15, 1994; Label: Patriot Records; Formats: CD, cassette

== Singles ==
Year	Single	Peak chart positions			Album
Year	Single	US Country	US Bubbling	CAN Country	Album
1993	"A Mind of Her Own"	51	—	65	John Berry
1993	"Kiss Me in the Car"	22	—	74	John Berry
1994	"Your Love Amazes Me"	1	—	1	John Berry
1994	"What's in It for Me"	5	20	2	John Berry
1994	"You and Only You"	4	—	1	John Berry
1995	"Standing on the Edge of Goodbye"	2	—	6	Standing on the Edge
1995	"I Think About It All the Time"	4	—	4	Standing on the Edge
1995	"If I Had Any Pride Left at All"	25	—	11	Standing on the Edge
1996	"Every Time My Heart Calls Your Name"	34	—	17	Standing on the Edge
1996	"Change My Mind"	10	3	30	Faces
1996	"She's Taken a Shine"	2	17	2	Faces
1997	"I Will, If You Will"	19	—	18	Faces
1997	"The Stone"	59	—	60	Crazy for the Girl (unreleased)
1998	"Over My Shoulder"	62	—	81	Better Than a Biscuit (unreleased)
1998	"Better Than a Biscuit"	75	—	—	Better Than a Biscuit (unreleased)
1999	"Love Is for Giving"	53	—	85	Wildest Dreams
1999	"Power Windows"	43	—	65	Wildest Dreams
2001	"How Much Do You Love Me"	—	—	—	All the Way to Here
2002	"Settle for Everything"	—	—	—	All the Way to Here
2004	"Will You Marry Me"	—	—	—	I Give My Heart
2007	"A Woman Like You"	—	—	—	Those Were the Days
2008	"The Balloon Song"	—	—	—	Those Were the Days
2012	"Give Me Back My America"	—	—	—	Real Man. Real Life. Real God.
"—" denotes releases that did not chart

=== Christmas singles ===
Year	Single	Peak positions	Album
Year	Single	US Country	Album
1995	"O Holy Night"	55	O Holy Night

=== As featured artist ===
Year	Single	Artist(s)	Peak positions	Album
Year	Single	Artist(s)	US Country	Album
1996	"Hope"	Various	57	—N/a
1999	"There He Goes"	Patsy Cline	70	Duets Volume 1

== Music videos ==
Year	Video	Director
1993	"A Mind of Her Own"	Steven T. Miller/R. Brad Murano
1993	"Kiss Me in the Car"	Joanne Gardner
1994	"Your Love Amazes Me"	John Lloyd Miller
1994	"You and Only You"	Michael McNamara
1995	"Standing on the Edge of Goodbye"	John Lloyd Miller
1995	"If I Had Any Pride Left at All"	Deaton-Flanigen Productions
1995	"O Holy Night"	Gustavo Garzon
1996	"Change My Mind"	Jon Small
1996	"She's Taken a Shine"	Jon Small
1996	"Hope" (Various)	Frank W. Ockenfels III
1997	"The Stone"	
1998	"Over My Shoulder"	Trey Fanjoy
1998	"Better Than a Biscuit"	Trey Fanjoy
1999	"Power Windows"	Trey Fanjoy
2012	"Give Me Back My America"	
