= Greatest Hits (John Berry album) =

Greatest hits album by John Berry
- Released: March 28, 2000
- Genre: Country
- Length: 43:09
- Label: Capitol Nashville
- Producer: Chuck Howard, Jimmy Bowen

John Berry chronology
Wildest Dreams (1999)	Greatest Hits (2000)	All the Way to There (2001)

Greatest Hits is the first compilation album by American country music artist John Berry. It was released on March 28, 2000, via Capitol Nashville.

== Track listing ==
No.	Title	Writer(s)	Length
1.	"Kiss Me in the Car"	John Berry, Chris Waters	3:34
2.	"You and Only You"	J. D. Martin, Chuck Jones	3:21
3.	"Your Love Amazes Me"	Amanda Hunt-Taylor, Jones	3:19
4.	"A Mind of Her Own"	Berry, Jones	3:22
5.	"She's Taken a Shine"	Greg Barnhill, Richard Bach	3:39
6.	"Change My Mind"	Jason Blume, A. J. Masters	3:18
7.	"Standing on the Edge of Goodbye"	Berry, Stewart Harris	4:04
8.	"I Will, If You Will"	Randy Goodrum, John Barlow Jarvis	3:04
9.	"What's in It for Me"	Gary Burr, John Jarrard	3:19
10.	"I Think About It All the Time"	Billy Livsey, Don Schlitz	3:40
11.	"If I Had Any Pride Left at All"	Troy Seals, Eddie Setser, John Greenebaum	3:43
12.	"We Can't Unmake Love" (duet with Wynonna)	Aaron Sain, Will Robinson	3:28

== Chart performance ==
Chart (2000)	Peak position
US Top Country Albums (Billboard)	43
