= Standing on the Edge =

Standing on the Edge may refer to:

- Standing on the Edge (John Berry album)

- "Standing on the Edge of Goodbye", its title track

- Standing on the Edge (Cheap Trick album)
- Standing on the Edge (The Browning EP), 2010
- "Standing on the Edge", song by Feeder from Echo Park, 2001
