= 4Runner =

4 Runner may refer to:

- Toyota 4Runner, a motor vehicle
- 4 Runner, a country music group
  - 4 Runner (album), this group's debut album
