= You Have the Right to Remain Silent =

You Have the Right to Remain Silent may refer to:

- "You have the right to remain silent", the opening of the Miranda warning given to criminal suspects in the United States
- You Have the Right to Remain Silent (album), a 1995 album by Perfect Stranger
- You Have the Right to Remain Silent..., a 1995 album by X-Cops
- You Have the Right to Remain Silent (EP), a 1980 EP by The Radiators
- "You Have the Right to Remain Silent" (song), a 1995 song by Perfect Stranger

== See also ==
- Right to silence, a legal principle which confers the right to refuse to answer questions from law enforcement officers or court officials
- The Right to Remain Silent, 1988 book by Charles Brandt
