= Power windows (disambiguation) =

Power windows may refer to:

- Power window, automobile windows that are raised and lowered by a switch
- Power Windows (album), a 1985 album by Rush
- "Power Windows" (song), a 1991 song by Billy Falcon
- Power windows, the term for selective color grading in film processing
