= Great Plains (Tennessee band) =

- Great Plains, 1991.

Background information
- Origin: Nashville, Tennessee, U.S.
- Genres: Country
- Years active: 1987–1996
- Labels: Columbia, Magnatone
- Past members: Jack Sundrud; Russ Pahl; Denny Dadmun-Bixby; Michael Young; Lex Browning

Great Plains was a progressive country pop band that formed in 1987. The band comprised Jack Sundrud (currently of Cimarron 615), Russ Pahl, Denny Dadmun-Bixby, Michael Young, and Lex Browning. In their career, they recorded two studio albums and had four singles enter the Billboard country charts. Their highest charting single, "Faster Gun", peaked at No. 41.

== Early days ==
The band began with Jack Sundrud, Russ Pahl, and Michael Young, who were all working in Michael Johnson's ("Bluer Than Blue") backup band. Sundrud was a seasoned professional, having toured with various acts such as Poco, Nicolette Larson, and Allman Brothers guitarist Dickey Betts. Brent Maher was producing Johnson and was looking for a new band to produce. Maher liked the sound of Michael Johnson's backup band. Sundrud was playing bass at the time, so Maher asked Austin Cunningham to join the band in the studio to do some experimentation. The band recorded a few tracks, mostly Cunningham's songs with himself on lead vocals. The band lineup / instrumentation at that time was Austin Cunningham on acoustic guitar and lead vocals; Jack Sundrud on bass and vocals; Russ Pahl on lead guitar, steel guitar and vocals, and Michael Young on drums. After recording a few sessions, Cunningham decided that he wanted to pursue a solo career and left the band. Sundrud then played some of his own songs for producer Maher and his daughter, Dianna, who ran Maher's publishing company, Moraine Music. They liked the songs and signed Sundrud to their publishing company as a songwriter. Maher and the band then recorded more tracks of Sundrud’s material, with Sundrud on lead vocals.

The band showcased for RCA, and they passed. It was around this time that the band decided to hire a regular bassist and move Sundrud to acoustic guitar and lead vocals, so in 1989, the band added Denny Dadmun-Bixby to join the band on bass and vocals. Sundrud first met Bixby when the latter was recording with Wild Choir, Gail Davies’ band (Sundrud's first road gig was with Davies in 1982.) The recording of the first record was slow and piece-meal since the band all had other gigs and needed income — Pahl was working with Don Williams, Bixby with Wild Choir and Gail Davies, and Young was doing sessions and had a growing custom-car business building cars. The band recorded when they could until 1989, but in early 1990, Sundrud was asked to join country rock band Poco after Richie Furay had left the Legacy tour (the Legacy tour and album initially featured all 5 original Poco members.) This was Sundrud's second stint with Poco, having been a member of the band from 1985–87; Sundrud's first professional band, the Minnesota-based Podipto, a regional band signed to GRT Records, had opened for Poco in 1971. Sundrud's Poco gig put off the finishing of the Great Plains project for a year.

== Record deal ==
The band finished the recording in 1991, showcased for Sony/Columbia and got a record deal. The début album was produced by Brent Maher and Don Potter, assisted by Brian Maher. The first single, "A Picture of You", written by Sundrud and songwriter Gary Burr peaked at No. 48. "Faster Gun" was their highest chart entry at No. 41.

The first album failed to bring in large sales numbers and both Russ Pahl and Michael Young left the band in 1992. Sundrud and Bixby hung on, using studio musicians to record most of a second album, but during the recording process, their record label, Sony, had a changing of executives and the band was dropped in 1993.

Also in 1993, they were nominated by the Academy of Country Music for Top New Vocal Group or Duet, along with Confederate Railroad and Little Texas, but lost to Confederate Railroad.

It was around this time that Brent Maher became involved with what would become Magnatone Records, an independent label financed by Roy Speer, who founded the Home Shopping Network. Other artists included Shelby Lynne, Billy Montana, Rich McCready, and Caryl Mack Parker.

== Another chance ==
Sundrud and Bixby decided to make Great Plains a band again and brought multi-instrumentalist / singer Lex Browning on board. They scrapped what they had been working on during the second album and started over, with Brent Maher and Don Potter producing again. The result was 1996's "Homeland". The label released 3 singles from that album, all of which once again failed to move beyond the 40s in the charts, including "Dancin' With The Wind", written by Sundrud and long-time Nashville songwriter / performer Craig Bickhardt; "Healin' Hands", written by Sundrud and Chuck Cannon; and "Wolverton Mountain", written by Claude King and Merle Kilgore. "Dancin' With The Wind" and "Wolverton Mountain" also had videos produced. The band then recorded a couple of songs with Sundrud's friend, producer Michael Clute (Diamond Rio). Magnatone released a single, "There's More Where That Came From", written by Sundrud and Tia Sillers, but they dropped the band the day after the single was released. Great Plains played some prior-committed dates for a few months and disbanded for good in 1996.

== After disbanding ==
Jack Sundrud rejoined Poco in 2000 and is still with the band as of 2015, once again playing bass and providing vocals. Sundrud co-wrote the hit "Cain's Blood" with Michael Johnson for the vocal group 4 Runner, which peaked at No. 26 on the country charts in 1995. He also co-wrote (with Craig Bickhardt) the No. 1 country hit "It Must Be Love" for Ty Herndon. Sundrud recorded a solo album, By My Own Hand, in 2005, and a second album effort in collaboration with Craig Bickhardt called Idlewheel in 2006 which morphed into a full band with tour dates through 2008.

Lex Browning returned to Portland, Oregon, where he had previously played with Jeffrey Frederick's band, Les Clams. He is a member of the Freak Mountain Ramblers, with whom he has recorded four albums, and in 2009 released his first solo album, Good Rain on Red Newt Records. As of September 2018, Browning joined his ex-bandmate Sundrud in Poco, where he plays guitar, fiddle and vocals.

Dadmun-Bixby sang backing vocals on Suzy Bogguss' 1998 album Nobody Love, Nobody Gets Hurt. He toured with Suzy Bogguss and Rodney Crowell playing bass and adding backing vocals before returning to Portland, Oregon where he often performs with Lex Browning. He has also released two CDs of his own, Fish Out Of Water in 2002 and JOYRIDE in 2017.

== Discography ==
=== Albums ===
Title	Album details
Great Plains	Release date: October 22, 1991; Label: Columbia Records
Homeland	Release date: June 4, 1996; Label: Magnatone Records

=== Singles ===
Year	Single	Peak chart positions		Album
Year	Single	US Country	CAN Country	Album
1991	"A Picture of You"	63	—	Great Plains
1992	"Faster Gun"	41	42	Great Plains
1992	"Iola"	63	71	Great Plains
1996	"Dancin' with the Wind"	58	—	Homeland
1996	"Healin' Hands"	—	—	Homeland
1996	"Wolverton Mountain"	—	—	Homeland
1997	"There's More Where That Came From"	—	—	Single only
"—" denotes releases that did not chart

=== Music videos ===
Year	Video	Director
1991	"A Picture of You"	Michael Salomon
1992	"Faster Gun"	Pete Cummings
1996	"Dancin' with the Wind"	Gerry Wenner
1996	"Healin' Hands"	Charley Randazzo
1996	"Wolverton Mountain"	Bob Burwell, Rod Thompson

== Awards and nominations ==
Year	Organization	Award	Nominee/Work	Result
1993	Academy of Country Music Awards	Top New Vocal Group or Duet	Great Plains	Nominated
