= Made for Each Other =

Made for Each Other may refer to:

- Made for Each Other (1939 film), starring Carole Lombard and James Stewart
- Made for Each Other (1953 film), a 1953 Mexican musical comedy film
- Made for Each Other (1971 film), featuring Renée Taylor and Joseph Bologna
- Made for Each Other (2009 film), starring Bijou Phillips and Christopher Masterson
- Made for Each Other (Calvin Wiggett album), 1995
- Made for Each Other (Sonny Stitt album)

== See also ==
- Ek Duuje Ke Liye, ((We Are) Made for Each Other), 1981 Hindi romantic tragedy film
