= All You Ever Do Is Bring Me Down =

Single by The Mavericks featuring Flaco Jiménez

from the album Music for All Occasions
- B-side: "Volver, Volver"
- Released: January 8, 1996
- Genre: Americana, Tex-Mex
- Length: 4:20
- Label: MCA
- Songwriters: Raul Malo, Al Anderson
- Producers: Don Cook, Raul Malo

The Mavericks singles chronology
"Here Comes the Rain" (1995)	"All You Ever Do Is Bring Me Down" (1996)	"Missing You" (1996)

"All You Ever Do Is Bring Me Down" is a song written by Raul Malo and Al Anderson, and recorded by American country music group The Mavericks featuring accordionist Flaco Jiménez. It was released in January 1996 as the second single from the 1995 album Music for All Occasions. The song reached number 13 on the Billboard Hot Country Singles & Tracks chart, representing the band's highest entry there, and Jiménez's only entry.

== Critical reception ==
In 2024, Rolling Stone ranked the song at number 159 on its 200 Greatest Country Songs of All Time ranking.

== Music video ==
The music video was directed by Gerry Wenner and was filmed in Santa Fe, New Mexico. It premiered in January 1996.

== Chart performance ==
"All You Ever Do Is Bring Me Down" debuted at number 66 on the U.S. Billboard Hot Country Singles & Tracks for the week of January 20, 1996.

Chart (1996)	Peak position
Canada Country Singles (RPM)	15
US Hot Country Songs (Billboard)	13
