= Change My Mind (The Oak Ridge Boys song) =

Single by John Berry

from the album Faces
- B-side: "Standing on the Edge of Goodbye"
- Released: July 15, 1996
- Genre: Country
- Length: 3:16
- Label: Capitol Nashville
- Songwriters: Jason Blume, A. J. Masters
- Producer: Chuck Howard

John Berry singles chronology
"Every Time My Heart Calls Your Name" (1996)	"Change My Mind" (1996)	"She's Taken a Shine" (1996)

"Change My Mind" is a song written by Jason Blume and A. J. Masters, and recorded by American country music artist John Berry. It was released in July 1996 as the first single from the album Faces. The song reached No. 10 on the Billboard Hot Country Singles & Tracks chart.

"Change My Mind" was originally recorded by The Oak Ridge Boys, whose version peaked at number 70 on the Billboard Hot Country Singles & Tracks chart in 1991. Their version, with "Our Love Is Here to Stay" on the B-side, appears on their 1991 album Unstoppable for RCA Records.

== Content ==
The narrator is looking to his lover to help save their relationship. He wants her to change his mind about the problems they are experiencing in their relationship.

== Critical reception (John Berry) ==
Larry Flick, of Billboard magazine reviewed the song favorably, saying that "power and passion" are "abundant" in the song. He goes on to say that Berry seems to be "exploring more of the nuances in his powerful voice on this fine outing."

== Music video (John Berry) ==
The music video was directed by Jon Small and premiered in July 1996.

== Chart performance ==
=== The Oak Ridge Boys ===
Chart (1991)	Peak position
US Hot Country Songs (Billboard)	70

=== John Berry ===
"Change My Mind" debuted at number 65 on the U.S. Billboard Hot Country Singles & Tracks for the week of July 27, 1996.

Chart (1996)	Peak position
Canada Country Singles (RPM)	30
US Bubbling Under Hot 100 (Billboard)	3
US Hot Country Songs (Billboard)	10
