= Perfect Stranger (band) =

American country music band

- Origin: Carthage, Texas, U.S.
- Genre: Country
- Years active: 1986-Present
- Labels: Pacific, Curb, Smith Music Group
- Members: Shayne Morrison; Steve Murray; Chad Ware; Scott Zucknick
- Past members: Andy Ginn; Marty Arbter; Doug Martin; Richard Raines; Clint Williams; Marcus Eldridge
- Website: perfectstrangercountry.com

Perfect Stranger are a long-running American country music band founded in 1986 in the state of Texas by Steve Murray (lead vocals), Shayne Morrison (bass guitar), Andy Ginn (drums), and Richard Raines (guitar). Murray and Morrison re-formed the band in 2025 and resumed touring. On their official Facebook page, Perfect Stranger announced plans for a new studio album in 2026.

After several years of performing throughout Texas, the quartet released an independent album in 1994; this album was later picked up by Curb Records, who re-packaged and re-released it a year later. By 1995, its second single (entitled "You Have the Right to Remain Silent") had become a Top 5 hit on the Billboard Hot Country Singles & Tracks (now Hot Country Songs) charts.

Although Perfect Stranger never entered Top 40 on the country charts again, the band continued to perform and record throughout the 1990s, charting several more singles before eventually exiting Curb in the late 1990s. In addition, Andy Ginn was replaced by Marty Arbter on drums. Perfect Stranger returned to Curb to release its second album, The Hits, in 2001, and was dropped again afterward. In 2009, Morrison formed a new version of the band composed of co-lead singers/guitarists Marcus Eldridge and Clint Williams, bassist Shayne Morrison, lead guitarist Chad Ware, and drummer Doug Martin. They released a third album, Shake the World, in 2009. Morrison briefly re-established the band in 2010 with Murray, Raines, and new drummer Scott Zucknick. After performing a number of shows, Perfect Stranger paused activity. During the band's hiatus, Murray performed shows as a solo act under his own name and backed by other bands. Murray and Morrison officially announced the reformation of Perfect Stranger in 2025, which resulted in numerous concerts at venues, theaters and package shows. In 2026, Perfect Stranger announced they are currently recording a new studio album.

== Biography ==
Perfect Stranger was founded in 1986 in Carthage, Texas, by Steve Murray (lead vocals), Shayne Morrison (bass guitar), Richard Raines (lead guitar), and Andy Ginn (drums). They originally performed as Midnight Express before assuming the name Perfect Stranger. The four artists played together throughout the state of Texas, mostly in clubs and at rodeos. In December 1994, they released an independent album on the Pacific label, entitled It's Up to You. Featured on it was the single "Ridin' the Rodeo". Written by Vince Gill and Kostas, the song was considered the biggest independent country music hit in the United States at the time, although it never reached the Billboard charts.

A second single, entitled "You Have the Right to Remain Silent", followed soon afterward. By the time of its release, Perfect Stranger's success as an independent act had been noticed by Curb Records, who acquired the band's debut album and its single. Curb continued promoting "You Have the Right to Remain Silent". It's Up to You was then re-packaged and re-released in 1995 as You Have the Right to Remain Silent, the band's major-label debut. By the middle of the year, its title track had reached No. 4 on the country music charts, and No. 61 on the Billboard Hot 100.

They were nominated in 1996 at the 31st Academy of Country Music Awards for Best New Vocal Duo or Group of the Year, along with 4 Runner and Lonestar, losing to the latter group.

Throughout the 1990s and into the 2000s, Perfect Stranger continued to chart singles on occasion, although none of their other singles entered Top 40 on the country music charts. By the end of the 1990s, Andy Ginn had departed, with Marty Arbter taking over on drums. They eventually left Curb in the late 1990s, but rejoined the label in the early 2000s.

The band's second album, The Hits, was issued in 2001, also on Curb. This album included a re-recording of "You Have the Right to Remain Silent", as well as "Fire When Ready" and "A Little Bit More of Your Love", which had charted in 1997. The album also produced two more non-charting singles in its title track (co-written by former MCA Records artist Marty Brown) and "Miracle". After these two, the band exited Curb again.

All of the original members except Morrison eventually left. They were replaced by co-lead vocalists Clint Williams and Marcus Eldridge, Chad Ware (guitar), and Doug Martin (drums). A third album, Shake the World, was released on June 2, 2009, via Smith Music Group.

Original members Morrison, Raines and Murray briefly re-established in 2010 with new drummer Scott Zucknick.

Richard Raines died on June 1, 2013, at his home in Mineola, Texas, following a long battle with depression. He was 48.

== Discography ==
Albums

Title	Album details	Peak chart positions		
Title	Album details	US Country	US	CAN Country
It's Up to You	Release date: December 1994; Label: Pacific	—	—	—
You Have the Right to Remain Silent (re-issue of It's Up to You)	Release date: June 13, 1995; Label: Curb Records	7	68	13
The Hits	Release date: June 26, 2001; Label: Curb Records	—	—	—
Shake the World	Release date: June 9, 2009; Label: Smith Music Group	—	—	—
"—" denotes releases that did not chart

Singles

Year	Single	Peak chart positions			Album
Year	Single	US Country	US	CAN Country	Album
1994	"Ridin' the Rodeo"	—	—	—	It's Up to You
1995	"You Have the Right to Remain Silent"	4	61	8	You Have the Right to Remain Silent
1995	"I Am a Stranger Here Myself"	52	—	41	You Have the Right to Remain Silent
1996	"Remember the Ride"	56	—	65	You Have the Right to Remain Silent
1996	"Cut Me Off"	—	—	—	You Have the Right to Remain Silent
1997	"Fire When Ready"	62	—	—	The Hits
1999	"A Little Bit More of Your Love"	66	—	—	The Hits
2000	"Coming Up Short Again"	75	—	—	—N/a
2001	"The Hits"	—	—	—	The Hits
2001	"Miracle"	—	—	—	The Hits
2009	"Turn Around Point"	—	—	—	Shake the World
"—" denotes releases that did not chart

Music videos

Year	Video	Director
1994	"Ridin' the Rodeo"	Chuck Price
1995	"You Have the Right to Remain Silent"	
1995	"I Am a Stranger Here Myself"	
2001	"Miracle"	

== Awards and nominations ==
Year	Organization	Award	Nominee/Work	Result
1996	Academy of Country Music Awards	Top New Vocal Group or Duet	Perfect Stranger	Nominated
