= Every Time My Heart Calls Your Name =

Single by John Berry

from the album Standing on the Edge
- Released: February 17, 1996
- Genre: Country
- Length: 3:08
- Label: Patriot
- Songwriters: Gary Heyde, J.B. Rudd
- Producers: Jimmy Bowen; Chuck Howard

John Berry singles chronology
"If I Had Any Pride Left at All" (1995)	"Every Time My Heart Calls Your Name" (1996)	"Change My Mind" (1996)

"Every Time My Heart Calls Your Name" is a song written by Gary Heyde and J.B. Rudd, and recorded by American country music artist John Berry. It was released in February 1996 as the fourth single from the album Standing on the Edge. The song reached #34 on the Billboard Hot Country Singles & Tracks chart.

== Critical reception ==
Jim Ridley of New Country magazine described the song favorably, stating that it sounded like a track from Meat Loaf's Bat Out of Hell album.

== Chart performance ==
Chart (1996)	Peak position
Canada Country Singles (RPM)	17
US Hot Country Songs (Billboard)	34
