= I Try to Think About Elvis =

- Cassette Single Cover

Single by Patty Loveless

from the album When Fallen Angels Fly
- B-side: "Ships"
- Released: July 30, 1994
- Recorded: January 27, 1994
- Genre: Country
- Length: 2:51 (album version); 2:44 (radio edit)
- Label: Epic
- Songwriter: Gary Burr
- Producer: Emory Gordy Jr.

Patty Loveless singles chronology
"How Can I Help You Say Goodbye" (1994)	"I Try to Think About Elvis" (1994)	"Here I Am" (1994)

Music video
- "I Try to Think About Elvis" on YouTube

"I Try to Think About Elvis" is a song written by Gary Burr, and recorded by American country music artist Patty Loveless. It was released in July 1994 by Epic Records as the first single from her seventh album, When Fallen Angels Fly (1994). The song, produced by Emory Gordy Jr., charted for 20 weeks on the US Billboard Hot Country Singles and Tracks chart, reaching number three during the week of October 22, 1994. American Aquarium covered the song on their 2021 album Slappers, Bangers, and Certified Twangers: Vol 1.

== Critical reception ==
Larry Flick from Billboard magazine wrote, "One of country music's great singers gets a little gimmicky with this uptempo debut single from her upcoming album. Vocally, of course, Loveless shines, but this rock-flavored single, with its rapid-fire references to everything from Elvis to Oprah to the Rolling Stones, is not the best showcase for such a tradition-based artist."

== Music video ==
The accompanying music video for "I Try to Think About Elvis" was directed by American filmmaker John Lloyd Miller, and premiered in mid-1994. It features Loveless singing the song on various sets resembling the lyrics, such as a talk show. She is also seen on a wooden lift that takes her high into the air (which is actually a screen) as well as a man dressed in a tropical piece playing guitar (he is also seen with Loveless on the talk show). The song starts 20 seconds after the video begins, as it first shows Loveless in a bed scene forgetting her lines, when the director scolds her for doing so.

When played on CMT, the credit of the song is simply read "Think About Elvis" instead of "I Try to Think About Elvis".

== Charts ==
=== Weekly charts ===
Chart (1994)	Peak position
Canada Country Singles (RPM)	12
US Bubbling Under Hot 100 (Billboard)	15
US Hot Country Songs (Billboard)	3

=== Year-end charts ===
Chart (1994)	Position
US Hot Country Songs (Billboard)	29
