= Rebecca Miller (singer) =

- Origin: Six Nations, Ontario, Canada
- Genres: Country
- Occupation: Singer
- Instrument: Vocals
- Years active: 1995–present
- Labels: Wolfe Lake; New Sun Records

Rebecca Miller is a Canadian country music artist. Her 1995 single "Listen to the Radio" reached the Top 20 of the RPM Country Tracks chart. An album was planned for release, but shelved when her record label closed. In 2009, she was signed to Crystal Shawanda's label, New Sun Records.

== Discography ==
=== Singles ===
| Year | Single | CAN Country |
|---|---|---|
| 1995 | "Listen to the Radio" | 20 |
| 1998 | "Country to the Bone" | 58 |
| 1999 | "If I'd Never Loved You" | 69 |
