= Texas Tornado (song) =

Single by Tracy Lawrence

from the album I See It Now
- Released: April 3, 1995
- Recorded: 1994
- Genre: Country
- Length: 3:24
- Label: Atlantic PRCD 6135
- Songwriter: Bobby Braddock
- Producer: Tracy Lawrence

Tracy Lawrence singles chronology
"As Any Fool Can See" (1994)	"Texas Tornado" (1995)	"If the World Had a Front Porch" (1995)

"Texas Tornado" is a song written by Bobby Braddock, and recorded by American country music artist Tracy Lawrence. It was released in April 1995 as the third single from Lawrence's album I See It Now. It became his sixth number-one hit on the Billboard country singles charts and also reached number one on the Canadian RPM Country Tracks chart.

== Content ==
Braddock was inspired to write "Texas Tornado" by a tempestuous relationship with a romantic partner who had considered becoming a professional storm chaser. The song is a mid-tempo country ballad in which the narrator recalls a lover, whom he describes as a "Texas tornado, blowing [him] away again". It was also the only track on I See It Now that Lawrence produced himself.

== Music video ==
The music video was directed by Marc Ball and premiered in April 1995. The video pictures Lawrence as a ranch hand who is smitten with a "Texas tornado" of a woman, and her young son. Scenes also feature Lawrence performing the song in a barn at dusk.

As each clip in the series unfolds, Lawrence appears dressed in the garb from the previous video, as he makes a "quantum leap" into a new time zone and tune. The sequence includes such clips as "Renegades, Rebels, and Rogues", "If the Good Die Young", and "As Any Fool Can See". "The idea of tying all the videos together seemed logical, and once we hit on the concept of time travel, it just seemed natural," says Ball of the serial format. "We figured maybe the fans would grow to love it, even though the songs are vastly different from one another."

== Chart positions ==
"Texas Tornado" debuted at number 64 on the U.S. Billboard Hot Country Singles and Tracks for the week of April 15, 1995.

Chart (1995)	Peak position
Canada Country Singles (RPM)	1
US Hot Country Songs (Billboard)	1

=== Year-end charts ===
Chart (1995)	Position
Canada Country Tracks (RPM)	12
US Country Songs (Billboard)	15
