= You Don't Even Know Who I Am =

- Cassette Single Cover

Single by Patty Loveless

from the album When Fallen Angels Fly
- B-side: "Over My Shoulder"
- Released: March 18, 1995
- Recorded: 1994
- Genre: Country
- Length: 4:04
- Label: Epic
- Songwriter: Gretchen Peters
- Producer: Emory Gordy Jr.

Patty Loveless singles chronology
"Here I Am" (1994)	"You Don't Even Know Who I Am" (1995)	"Halfway Down" (1995)

"You Don't Even Know Who I Am" is a song written by Gretchen Peters and recorded by American country music artist Patty Loveless. It was released in March 1995 as the third single from Loveless's album When Fallen Angels Fly.

== Content ==
The song is a ballad that describes the end of a marriage where both spouses realize they have become complete strangers over time.

The first verse describes the wife's decision to leave her ring on the pillow in their bedroom and a letter in the kitchen "next to the grocery list", describing her feelings of distance towards her husband, ending with ”You don’t even know who I am/So what do you care if I go?”

The second verse describes the husband's reaction to the events. He thinks about what he saw, calls her "to say he was sorry/but he couldn't remember what for" and reciprocates her feelings of distance, citing he feels the same way about the state of their marriage, concluding "You don’t even know who I am/So what do I care if you go?”

== Music video ==
The music video premiered on CMT March 20, 1995, and was directed by Jim Shea.

== Background ==
According to Loveless, "The one that got a lot of reaction was "You Don't Even Know Who I Am." It starts out and you think, "Okay, here's another woman crying about something," and then it swings around and it says he finds her ring on the pillow and he starts to think, "Hey, you didn't know who I was either." They got to the point in their marriage that they didn't know each other anymore. There's been a lot of men that this song just tears up. I've often said that country is the cheapest therapy you can get. Music can be good for your soul. People can be moved to tears."

"You Don't Even Know Who I Am" was nominated for 1996 Academy of Country Music Award Song of the Year award and the Grammy awards for Best Country Song and Best Female Country Performance.

The song charted for 20 weeks on the Billboard Hot Country Singles and Tracks chart, reaching number 5 during the week of June 17, 1995. It was written by Gretchen Peters.

== Chart positions ==
Chart (1995)	Peak position
Canada Country Singles (RPM)	17
US Bubbling Under Hot 100 (Billboard)	17
US Hot Country Songs (Billboard)	5

=== Year-end charts ===
Chart (1995)	Position
US Country Songs (Billboard)	60
