= She's Taken a Shine =

Single by John Berry

from the album Faces
- B-side: "Time to Be a Man"
- Released: November 18, 1996
- Recorded: 1996
- Genre: Country
- Length: 3:41
- Label: Capitol Nashville
- Songwriters: Greg Barnhill, Richard Bach
- Producer: Chuck Howard

John Berry singles chronology
| "Change My Mind" (1996) | "She's Taken a Shine" (1996) | "I Will, If You Will" (1997) |

"She's Taken a Shine" is a song written by Greg Barnhill and Richard Bach, and recorded by American country music artist John Berry. It was released in November 1996 as the second single from the album Faces. The song reached number 2 on both the Billboard Hot Country Singles & Tracks chart and the Canadian RPM Country Tracks chart. It also reached number 1 status on the Radio & Records Country Top 50 chart and number 38 on the Billboard Top 100 Country Hits of 1997.

== Content ==
The lyric paints a vivid picture of two lovers and how Rosie's life changes in the light of the good relationship. The bridge defines her improved self worth (with her new found happiness) as coming from within herself, not just from Jessie's love, but more as a confirmation/validation within herself from his appreciation of her qualities.

== Critical reception ==
Deborah Evans Price, of Billboard magazine reviewed the song favorably, calling it a "great love song." She went on to say that Berry "delivers the song in a straightforward manner that brings the story to life and the skillful production lets his vocals shine."

== Music video ==
The music video was directed by Jon Small and premiered in November 1996. In the video, Jesse is a construction worker who visits Rosie's Cantina, which is a food truck located near the construction site. Jesse is unable to pay for his cup of coffee, and gives Rosie his Powerball lottery ticket in lieu of payment. Jesse and Rosie develop a romantic relationship, and initially forget about the Powerball ticket, which Rosie posted on the truck's bulletin board. Near the end of the video, they realize that the ticket won, and they use the proceeds to upgrade Rosie's Cantina. They open a full sized restaurant together, called "Rosie and Jesse's Cantina".

== Chart performance ==
"She's Taken a Shine" debuted at number 61 on the U.S. Billboard Hot Country Singles & Tracks for the week of December 7, 1996.

| Chart (1996–1997) | Peak position |
|---|---|
| Canada Country Singles (RPM) | 2 |
| US Bubbling Under Hot 100 (Billboard) | 17 |
| US Hot Country Songs (Billboard) | 2 |

=== Year-end charts ===
| Chart (1997) | Position |
|---|---|
| Canada Country Tracks (RPM) | 19 |
| US Country Songs (Billboard) | 38 |
