= Music for All Occasions =

Studio album by the Mavericks
- Released: September 26, 1995
- Recorded: February–June 1995
- Genre: Americana; neotraditional country
- Length: 38:46
- Label: MCA Nashville
- Producer: Don Cook, Raul Malo

The Mavericks chronology
What a Crying Shame (1994)	Music for All Occasions (1995)	Trampoline (1998)

Singles from Music for All Occasions
- 1. "Here Comes the Rain" Released: August 14, 1995; 2. "All You Ever Do Is Bring Me Down" Released: January 8, 1996

Music for All Occasions is the fourth studio album by American country music band the Mavericks. The album was released on September 26, 1995, by MCA Nashville. It includes the singles "Here Comes the Rain", "All You Ever Do Is Bring Me Down" and "Missing You". "Somethin' Stupid" is a cover of the Frank Sinatra song.

The song "Foolish Heart" was used on the soundtrack of the 1995 film From Dusk till Dawn.

== Critical reception ==
Professional ratings
Review scores
Source	Rating
AllMusic	4/5 stars
Chicago Tribune	2.5/4 stars
Christgau's Consumer Guide	(dud)
The Encyclopedia of Popular Music	4/5 stars
Entertainment Weekly	B+
Spin	6/10

AllMusic reviewer Mark Deming wrote that "the '50s pop accents that were bubbling under the surface on their previous set began to rise to the surface, both in their music and in the wink-and-nudge camp of the album's artwork" and "the polished cool of its surfaces aren't as immediately inviting" as the band's previous album "but the record's abundant pleasures become clear upon repeated listenings, and its one of the group's best and most accomplished studio sets."

== Track listing ==
No.	Title	Writer(s)	Length
1.	"Foolish Heart"	Raul Malo, Evan York	3:34
2.	"One Step Away"	James House, Malo	2:54
3.	"Here Comes the Rain"	Kostas, Malo	3:48
4.	"Missing You"	Al Anderson, Malo	3:29
5.	"All You Ever Do Is Bring Me Down" (featuring Flaco Jiménez)	Anderson, Malo	4:20
6.	"My Secret Flame"	Rafe Van Hoy	3:26
7.	"The Writing on the Wall"	Anderson, Malo	3:21
8.	"Loving You"	Anderson, Malo	4:19
9.	"If You Only Knew"	Kostas, Malo	2:56
10.	"I'm Not Gonna Cry for You"	Malo	3:40
11.	"Somethin' Stupid" (featuring Trisha Yearwood)	C. Carson Parks	2:59

== Chart performance ==
Chart (1995)	Peak position
U.S. Billboard Top Country Albums	9
U.S. Billboard 200	58
Canadian RPM Country Albums	3
Canadian RPM Top Albums	54

== Certifications ==
Region	Certification	Certified units/sales
Canada (Music Canada)	Platinum	100,000^{^}
United States (RIAA)	Gold	500,000^{^}
^{^} Shipments figures based on certification alone.
