= John Berry (album) =

Studio album by John Berry
- Released: June 7, 1993
- Studio: Javelina Recording Studios, OmniSound Studios, Quad Studios and Sound Stage Studios (Nashville, Tennessee)
- Genre: Country
- Length: 35:05
- Label: Liberty Records
- Producer: Chuck Howard

John Berry chronology
| John Berry (1993) | Standing on the Edge (1995) |

Singles from John Berry
- 1. "A Mind of Her Own" Released: June 5, 1993; 2. "Kiss Me in the Car" Released: September 25, 1993; 3. "Your Love Amazes Me" Released: January 31, 1994; 4. "What's in It for Me" Released: June 13, 1994; 5. "You and Only You" Released: October 3, 1994

Professional ratings
Review scores
| Source | Rating |
|---|---|
| Allmusic | 3/5 stars |

John Berry is the debut studio album by American country music artist of the same name. It was released on June 7, 1993, by Liberty Records. It peaked at #13 on the Top Country Albums chart, and was certified Platinum by the RIAA. Singles released from it include "A Mind of Her Own", "Kiss Me in the Car", "Your Love Amazes Me", "What's In It for Me" and "You and Only You".

== Track listing ==
| No. | Title | Writer(s) | Length |
|---|---|---|---|
| 1. | "Somebody" | Kostas | 3:01 |
| 2. | "Kiss Me in the Car" | John Berry, Chris Waters | 3:27 |
| 3. | "More Sorry Than You'll Ever Know" | Berry, Chuck Jones | 3:58 |
| 4. | "A Mind of Her Own" | Berry, Jones | 3:22 |
| 5. | "Your Love Amazes Me" | Amanda Hunt-Taylor, Jones | 3:53 |
| 6. | "More Than Just a Little" | Lisa Palas, George Teren | 3:02 |
| 7. | "You and Only You" | Jones, J. D. Martin | 4:00 |
| 8. | "Destiny" | Kye Fleming, Jones, Mary Ann Kennedy | 3:34 |
| 9. | "What's in It for Me" | Gary Burr, John Jarrard | 3:19 |
| 10. | "When Love Dies" | Matraca Berg | 3:29 |

== Personnel ==
As listed in liner notes.

- John Berry – lead vocals
- Bill Cuomo – keyboards
- John Barlow Jarvis – acoustic piano
- Chuck Jones – electric guitar, backing vocals
- John Willis – electric guitar
- Reggie Young – electric guitar
- Billy Joe Walker, Jr. – acoustic guitar
- Biff Watson – acoustic guitar
- Dan Dugmore – steel guitar
- Michael Rhodes – bass
- Willie Weeks – bass
- Eddie Bayers – drums
- John Catchings – cello (10)
- Greg Barnhill – backing vocals
- Mary Ann Kennedy – backing vocals
- J.D. Martin – backing vocals
- Pam Rose – backing vocals
- Dennis Wilson – backing vocals
- Curtis Young – backing vocals

== Production ==
- Chuck Howard – producer
- Bob Campbell-Smith – digital recording, overdub recording
- John Kelton – digital recording, mixing
- Graham R. Lewis – overdub recording
- Dennis Ritchie – overdub recording
- Derek Bason – recording assistant, mix assistant
- Barry Hall – overdub assistant
- Mel Jones – recording assistant, overdub assistant, mix assistant
- Patrick Kelly – recording assistant
- David Matthews – recording assistant
- Craig White – recording assistant
- Glenn Meadows – digital editing and mastering at Masterfonics (Nashville, Tennessee)
- Sandy McLeod – production assistant
- Chris Wormer – production assistant
- Brad Allen – A&R production
- Wyatt P. Fawns – A&R production
- Sherri Halford – creative director
- Buddy Jackson – art direction
- Beth Lee – design
- Frank Ockenfels – photography
- Mary Beth Felts – hair, make-up
- Corlew-O'Grady Management, Inc. – management

== Charts ==
=== Weekly charts ===
| Chart (1993–1994) | Peak position |
|---|---|
| Canadian Country Albums (RPM) | 1 |
| US Billboard 200 | 85 |
| US Top Country Albums (Billboard) | 13 |
| US Heatseekers Albums (Billboard) | 2 |

=== Year-end charts ===
| Chart (1994) | Position |
|---|---|
| US Top Country Albums (Billboard) | 56 |
| Chart (1995) | Position |
| US Top Country Albums (Billboard) | 45 |
