= Tineta =

- Born: Tineta Michelle Couturier; August 24, 1972
- Origin: Red Deer, Alberta, Canada
- Died: June 2, 2025 (aged 52)
- Genres: Country
- Occupation: Singer
- Instrument: Vocals
- Years active: 1991–96
- Labels: Royalty Records

Tineta Couturier, better known as Tineta (August 24, 1972 – June 2, 2025), was a Canadian country music artist. She released two albums on Royalty Records, Love on the Line (1991) and Drawn to the Fire (1995). Her 1995 single "Walkin' That Line" reached the Top 20 of the RPM Country Tracks chart.

== Discography ==
=== Albums ===
Title	Album details
Love on the Line	Release date: 1991; Label: Royalty Records
Drawn to the Fire	Release date: 1995; Label: Royalty Records

=== Singles ===
Year	Title	Peak positions	Album
Year	Title	CAN Country	Album
1992	"Slippin' Away" (as Tineta Couturier)	67	Love on the Line
1994	"Everyone's Laughin' but Me"	33	Love on the Line
1995	"Walkin' That Line"	19	Drawn to the Fire
1995	"From My Heart's Point of View"	27	Drawn to the Fire
1996	"A Little Gettin' Used To"	50	Drawn to the Fire
