= Faces (John Berry album) =

Studio album by John Berry
- Released: September 17, 1996
- Studios: The Tracking Room, KD Studios, Woodland Sound Studios and Masterfonics (Nashville, Tennessee); The Castle (Franklin, Tennessee)
- Genre: Country
- Length: 36:28
- Label: Capitol Records Nashville
- Producer: Chuck Howard

John Berry chronology
O Holy Night (1995)	Faces (1996)	Wildest Dreams (1999)

Singles from Faces
- 1. "Change My Mind" Released: July 15, 1996; 2. "She's Taken a Shine" Released: November 18, 1996; 3. "I Will, If You Will" Released: April 19, 1997

Professional ratings
Review scores
Source	Rating
Allmusic	2.5/5 stars

Faces is the fifth studio album by American country music artist John Berry. It was released on September 17, 1996, by Capitol Records Nashville. It peaked at #9 on the Top Country Albums chart, and was certified Gold by the Recording Industry Association of America. The album's singles "Change My Mind," "She's Taken a Shine" and "I Will, If You Will" all reached Top 20 on the Hot Country Songs charts.

== Track listing ==
No.	Title	Writer(s)	Length
1.	"She's Taken a Shine"	Richard Bach, Greg Barnhill	3:39
2.	"Change My Mind"	Jason Blume, A. J. Masters	3:16
3.	"I Will, If You Will"	Randy Goodrum, John Barlow Jarvis	3:04
4.	"He Doesn't Even Know Her"	Michael Bolton, Gary Burr	3:25
5.	"Faithfully"	Chuck Jones, Pam Rose	3:12
6.	"Livin' on Love"	Craig Fuller, Gary Nicholson	4:12
7.	"Time to Be a Man"	John Berry, Nicholson	5:07
8.	"Forty Again"	John Greenebaum, Troy Seals, Eddie Setser	3:21
9.	"Love Is Everything"	Barnhill, Jim Daddario	3:41
10.	"I Give My Heart"	Billy Kirsch, Allen Shamblin	3:31

== Personnel ==
Musicians

- John Berry – lead vocals
- Barry Beckett – Wurlitzer electric piano
- John Hobbs – keyboards
- Billy Kirsch – acoustic piano
- Steve Nathan – keyboards
- Dann Huff – electric guitars
- Brent Mason – electric guitars
- Brent Rowan – electric guitars
- Billy Joe Walker Jr. – acoustic guitars
- Bruce Bouton – steel guitar
- Dan Dugmore – steel guitar
- Sonny Garrish – steel guitar
- Michael Rhodes – bass
- Eddie Bayers – drums
- Terry McMillan – percussion
- Larry Franklin – fiddle

String section (Tracks 2, 3 & 10)

- Conni Ellisor – arrangements (2, 3)
- David Campbell – arrangements and conductor (10)
- Carl Gorodetzky – concertmaster
- Bob Mason and Carole Rabinowitz – cello
- Monisa Angell, Jim Grosjean and Kris Wilkinson – viola
- David Angell, David Davidson, Conni Ellisor, Carl Gorodetzky, Lee Larrison, Cate Myer, Randall Olson, Antoine Silverman, Pamela Sixfin and Alan Umstead – violin

Background vocals

- Michael Black (1, 2, 4, 5, 7–9)
- Mary Ann Kennedy (1, 2, 4–9)
- Darrell Scott (1, 2, 4, 5, 7, 9)
- Greg Gordon (2, 9)
- Dennis Wilson (2, 9)
- Patty Loveless (3)
- Gary Burr (4)
- Chuck Jones (5)
- Pam Rose (5)
- Delbert McClinton (6)
- Gary Nicholson (9)

=== Production ===
- Chuck Howard – producer
- Bob Campbell-Smith – associate producer, recording, additional recording
- Jeff Watkins – recording assistant, additional recording assistant
- Craig White – recording assistant, mixing (10)
- Cameron Plato – additional recording assistant
- Pete Greene – mixing (1–9)
- Csaba Pectoz – mixing (1–9)
- David Boyer – mix assistant (1–9)
- David Hall – mix assistant (1–9)
- Glenn Meadows – mastering
- Sandra Rankin – studio coordinator
- Scott Harkness – studio coordinating assistant
- Nancy H. Williams – production manager
- Susan Levy – art direction
- Beth Middleworth – design
- Mark Tucker – photography
- Susan Bessire – wardrobe
- Roger Estes – hair stylist
- Mary Beth Felts – make-up
- David Corlew with Corlew-O'Grady Management, Inc. – management

== Chart performance ==
Chart (1996)	Peak position
U.S. Billboard Top Country Albums	9
U.S. Billboard 200	83
Canadian RPM Country Albums	9
