= When Fallen Angels Fly =

Studio album by Patty Loveless
- Released: August 23, 1994
- Recorded: 1994
- Studios: Woodland Sound Studios, Sound Stage Studios and Masterfonics (Nashville, Tennessee)
- Genre: Neotraditional country
- Length: 36:04
- Label: Epic
- Producer: Emory Gordy Jr.

Patty Loveless chronology
Only What I Feel (1993)	When Fallen Angels Fly (1994)	The Trouble with the Truth (1996)

Singles from When Fallen Angels Fly
- 1. "I Try to Think About Elvis" Released: July 30, 1994; 2. "Here I Am" Released: November 12, 1994; 3. "You Don't Even Know Who I Am" Released: March 18, 1995; 4. "Halfway Down" Released: July 8, 1995

Professional ratings
Review scores
Source	Rating
AllMusic	4.5/5 stars
Chicago Tribune	3.5/4 stars
Entertainment Weekly	A
Gavin Report	(favorable)

When Fallen Angels Fly is the seventh studio album by American country music artist Patty Loveless, released on August 23, 1994. It reached #8 on the Top Country Albums charts and was certified Platinum for shipments of over 1,000,000 copies in the U.S. All four of its singles — "I Try to Think About Elvis," "You Don't Even Know Who I Am," "Here I Am," and "Halfway Down" — reached the Top Ten on the Hot Country Songs charts. "Old Weakness (Coming on Strong)" was also recorded by Greg Holland on his 1997 album Exception to the Rule and Delbert McClinton on his 1997 album One of the Fortunate Few. Both "Old Weakness" and "Over My Shoulder" were also recorded in 2002 by Tanya Tucker on her album Tanya.

When Fallen Angels Fly won the Country Music Association Award for Album of the Year in 1995; Loveless was only the third woman in the history of the CMA Awards to win.

== Track listing ==
No.	Title	Writer(s)	Length
1.	"A Handful of Dust"	Tony Arata	3:05
2.	"Halfway Down"	Jim Lauderdale	3:45
3.	"When the Fallen Angels Fly"	Billy Joe Shaver	4:33
4.	"You Don't Even Know Who I Am"	Gretchen Peters	4:04
5.	"Feelin' Good About Feelin' Bad"	Emory Gordy Jr., Jim Rushing	3:18
6.	"Here I Am"	Arata	2:59
7.	"I Try to Think About Elvis"	Gary Burr	2:49
8.	"Ships"	Peters	3:42
9.	"Old Weakness (Coming On Strong)"	Gary Nicholson, Bob DiPiero	2:59
10.	"Over My Shoulder"	Roger Murrah, Marcus Hummon	4:22

== Personnel ==
Production

- Emory Gordy Jr. – producer
- Bob Bullock – track recording
- Russ Martin – overdub recording
- John Guess – mixing
- Marty Williams – additional overdub recording
- Amy Hughes – tracking assistant, overdub assistant
- John Kliner – overdub assistant
- Craig White – additional overdub assistant
- Derek Bason – mix assistant
- Glenn Meadows – mastering
- Lauren Koch – production coordinator
- Bill Johnson – art direction
- Jodi Lynn Miller – design
- Randee St. Nicholas – photography
- Fitzgerald / Hartley Co. – management

Musicians

- Patty Loveless – vocals
- John Hobbs – acoustic piano
- John Barlow Jarvis – acoustic piano
- Mike Lawler – additional keyboards
- Richard Bennett – acoustic guitar, electric guitars
- Steve Gibson – acoustic guitar, electric guitars, mandolin
- Biff Watson – acoustic guitar
- Paul Worley – acoustic guitar
- Jerry Douglas – slide guitar
- Pete Finney – steel guitar
- Paul Franklin – steel guitar
- Sonny Garrish – steel guitar
- Stuart Duncan – mandolin, fiddle
- Emory Gordy Jr. – bass
- Owen Hale – drums
- Harry Stinson – drums, backing vocals
- Eddy Anderson – percussion
- Glen Duncan – fiddle
- Jimmy Hall – blues harp
- Tim Hensley – backing vocals
- Kathy Burdick – backing vocals
- Donna McElroy – backing vocals
- Liana Manis – backing vocals
- Carmella Ramsey – backing vocals
- Dawn Sears – backing vocals
- Curtis Young – backing vocals

== Charts ==
Chart (1994)	Peak position
US Billboard 200	60
US Top Country Albums (Billboard)	8
