= As Any Fool Can See =

Single by Tracy Lawrence

from the album I See It Now
- B-side: "Texas Tornado"
- Released: December 13, 1994
- Recorded: 1994
- Genre: Country
- Length: 3:03 (album version)
- Label: Atlantic 87180
- Songwriters: Paul Nelson; Kenny Beard
- Producers: Tracy Lawrence, Flip Anderson

Tracy Lawrence singles chronology
"I See It Now" (1994)	"As Any Fool Can See" (1994)	"Texas Tornado" (1995)

"As Any Fool Can See" is a song written by Paul Nelson and Kenny Beard, and recorded by American country music artist Tracy Lawrence. It was released on December 13, 1994 as the second single from his album, I See It Now. The song peaked at number 2 on the U.S. Billboard Hot Country Songs chart and at number 18 on Canada's RPM country chart.

== Critical reception ==
Deborah Evans Price, of Billboard magazine, reviewed the song favorably, saying that while Lawrence has "employed the fiddle hook at least once before" and the "melody does sound awfully familiar", the formula works due to his "usual wide-eyed and soulful vocal approach."

== Music video ==
The music video is a continuation of a Quantum Leap theme from many music videos Lawrence released in the mid-1990s. This particular video begins with the ending of the previous video for "I See It Now." Lawrence is "leaped" onto a ship that is being robbed by pirates. This scene alternates with Lawrence performing "As Any Fool Can See" in a rough Seaman's bar. Back on the ship, he emerges from below deck dressed as a pirate. After fighting through the other pirates, he rescues a woman that the pirates are trying to make walk the plank. As Lawrence jumps into the water, he is "leaped" to the next video, "Texas Tornado."

== Chart performance ==
"As Any Fool Can See" debuted at number 59 on the U.S. Billboard Hot Country Singles & Tracks for the week of December 31, 1994.

Chart (1994–1995)	Peak position
Canada Country Singles (RPM)	13
US Hot Country Songs (Billboard)	2

=== Year-end charts ===
Chart (1995)	Position
US Country Songs (Billboard)	29
