= Here Comes the Rain =

Single by The Mavericks

from the album Music for All Occasions
- B-side: "I'm Not Gonna Cry for You"
- Released: August 14, 1995
- Genre: Neotraditional country, western swing
- Length: 3:48
- Label: MCA
- Songwriters: Raul Malo, Kostas
- Producers: Don Cook, Raul Malo

The Mavericks singles chronology
"Blue Moon" (1995)	"Here Comes the Rain" (1995)	"All You Ever Do Is Bring Me Down" (1996)

"Here Comes the Rain" is a song written by Raul Malo and Kostas, and recorded by American country music group The Mavericks. It was released in August 1995 as the first single from the album Music for All Occasions. The song reached number 22 on the Billboard Hot Country Singles & Tracks chart and peaked at number 4 on the RPM Country Tracks chart in Canada. It also won The Mavericks the 1996 Grammy Award for Best Country Performance by a Duo or Group with Vocal.

== Music video ==
The music video was directed by Gerry Wenner and premiered in 1995.

== Chart performance ==
"Here Comes the Rain" debuted at number 72 on the U.S. Billboard Hot Country Singles & Tracks for the week of August 19, 1995.

Chart (1995)	Peak position
Canada Country Singles (RPM)	4
US Hot Country Songs (Billboard)	22

UK: 99

=== Year-end charts ===
Chart (1995)	Position
Canada Country Tracks (RPM)	51
