= Kiss Me in the Car =

Single by John Berry

from the album John Berry
- B-side: "More Than Just a Little"
- Released: September 25, 1993
- Genre: Country
- Length: 3:27
- Label: Liberty
- Songwriter(s): John Berry, Chris Waters
- Producer(s): Chuck Howard

John Berry singles chronology
"A Mind of Her Own" (1993)	"Kiss Me in the Car" (1993)	"Your Love Amazes Me" (1994)

"Kiss Me in the Car" is a song co-written and recorded by American country music artist John Berry. It was released in September 1993 as the second single from the album John Berry. The song reached #22 on the Billboard Hot Country Singles & Tracks chart. The song was written by Berry and Chris Waters.

== Chart performance ==
Chart (1993)	Peak position
US Hot Country Songs (Billboard)	22
Canadian RPM Country Tracks	74
