= I Will, If You Will =

Single by John Berry

from the album Faces
- B-side: "Love Is Everything"
- Released: April 19, 1997
- Genre: Country
- Length: 3:04
- Label: Capitol Nashville
- Songwriters: Randy Goodrum, John Barlow Jarvis
- Producer: Chuck Howard

John Berry singles chronology
| "She's Taken a Shine" (1996) | "I Will, If You Will" (1997) | "The Stone" (1997) |

"I Will, If You Will" is a song written by Randy Goodrum and John Barlow Jarvis, and recorded by American country music artist John Berry. It was released in April 1997 as the third single from the album Faces. They reached #19 on the Billboard Hot Country Singles & Tracks chart.

== Chart performance ==
| Chart (1997) | Peak position |
|---|---|
| Canada Country Singles (RPM) | 18 |
| US Hot Country Songs (Billboard) | 19 |
