= Halfway Down =

- CD-Single Cover

Single by Patty Loveless

from the album When Fallen Angels Fly
- B-side: "Feelin' Good About Feelin' Bad"
- Released: July 8, 1995
- Recorded: 1994
- Genre: Country
- Length: 3:45
- Label: Epic
- Songwriter: Jim Lauderdale
- Producer: Emory Gordy Jr.

Patty Loveless singles chronology
"You Don't Even Know Who I Am" (1995)	"Halfway Down" (1995)	"You Can Feel Bad" (1995)

"Halfway Down" is a song written by Jim Lauderdale, and recorded by American country music artist Patty Loveless. It was released in July 1995 as the fourth single from her album When Fallen Angels Fly. Dave Edmunds' recording was released in July 1994 on his Plugged In album.

The song charted for 20 weeks on the Billboard Hot Country Singles and Tracks chart, reaching number 6 during the week of October 7, 1995.

== Charts ==
=== Weekly charts ===
Chart (1995)	Peak position
Canada Country Singles (RPM)	16
US Hot Country Songs (Billboard)	6

=== Year-end charts ===
Chart (1995)	Position
US Country Songs (Billboard)	39
