= Here I Am (Patty Loveless song) =

- Cassette single Cover

Single by Patty Loveless

from the album When Fallen Angels Fly
- B-side: "When the Fallen Angels Fly"
- Released: November 12, 1994
- Recorded: 1994
- Genre: Country
- Length: 3:04
- Label: Epic
- Songwriter: Tony Arata
- Producer: Emory Gordy Jr.

Patty Loveless singles chronology
"I Try to Think About Elvis" (1994)	"Here I Am" (1994)	"You Don't Even Know Who I Am" (1995)

Music video
- "Here I Am" on YouTube

"Here I Am" is a song written by Tony Arata and recorded by American country music artist Patty Loveless. It was released in November 1994 by Epic Records as the second single from her seventh album, When Fallen Angels Fly (1994). The song reached a number four peak in February 1995.

== Critical reception ==
Larry Flick from Billboard magazine wrote, "With this searing ballad, composed by the writer of the Garth Brooks hit 'The Dance', Loveless continues to combine one of the best voices in country music with an uncanny knack for finding just the right song." Richard McVey from Cash Box stated, "A far cry from her previous release, 'I Try to Think About Elvis', this easy-paced, guitar/vocally-driven tune is classic Loveless. She pours emotions through her vocals like few can, and 'Here I Am' is no exception."

== Music video ==
The accompanying music video for "Here I am" premiered in December 1994.

== Charts ==
=== Weekly charts ===
Chart (1994–1995)	Peak position
Canada Country Singles (RPM)	11
US Hot Country Songs (Billboard)	4

=== Year-end charts ===
Chart (1995)	Position
Canada Country Tracks (RPM)	91
