= Calvin Wiggett =

Canadian country music singer (born 1966)

- Born: July 14, 1966 (age 59); Regina, Saskatchewan, Canada
- Genres: Country
- Occupation: Singer
- Instrument(s): Vocals, guitar
- Years active: 1995–present
- Labels: Royalty
- Website: calvin-wiggett.com

Calvin Wiggett (born July 14, 1966) is a Canadian country music singer. Wiggett recorded one studio album for Royalty Records, 1995's Made for Each Other. This album produced four chart singles for him on the Canadian country music charts, of which the highest was the No. 13-peaking "Love Music Loves to Dance."

== Biography ==
Though he was born in Regina, Saskatchewan, Wiggett has lived all over the world, from Bienfait, Saskatchewan to Williston, North Dakota to Calgary, Alberta to Tehran, Iran. After moving to Calgary, Wiggett entered his first singing contest in 1989, where he finished in the semi-finals. He continued entering contests, eventually winning CFCW's Star Search Talent Contest on February 26, 1995.

Later that year, Wiggett was signed to Royalty Records and released his first album, Made for Each Other. His first single, "Missing You", was released on September 1, 1995, with an accompanying video sent to NCN. The song reached the top 20 on the Canadian country singles chart, as did the follow-up, "Love Music Loves to Dance." In 1996, Wiggett was nominated for Best Male Artist at the RPM Big Country Awards, and Best Country Male Vocalist at the prestigious Juno Awards. He also received several nominations from the Alberta Recording Industry Association (ARIA) in 1996 and 1997.

On September 7, 1996, it was announced that Wiggett had signed an American record deal with Arista Nashville. As he traveled between Toronto and Nashville working on his second album, Wiggett continued to maintain his career in Canada with the singles "I Know What It's Not" and "Made for Each Other." Wiggett's second album was completed in 1998, but Arista ultimately chose not to release the project.

== Discography ==
=== Albums ===
Title	Details	Peak positions
Title	Details	CAN Country
Made for Each Other	Release date: 1995; Label: Royalty Records	14

=== Singles ===
Year	Single	Peak positions	Album
Year	Single	CAN Country	Album
1995	"Missing You"	18	Made for Each Other
1996	"Love Music Loves to Dance"	13	Made for Each Other
1996	"I Know What It's Not"	44	Made for Each Other
1997	"Made for Each Other"	54	Made for Each Other

=== Music videos ===
Year	Video
1995	"Missing You"
1996	"Love Music Loves to Dance"
1996	"I Know What It's Not"
