= Wildest Dreams (John Berry album) =

Studio album by John Berry
- Released: September 28, 1999
- Studio: Emerald Sound Studios, Starstruck Studios and The Tracking Room (Nashville, Tennessee); Sound Kitchen (Franklin, Tennessee)
- Genre: Country
- Length: 44:08
- Label: Lyric Street Records
- Producer: Mark Spiro

John Berry chronology
Faces (1996)	Wildest Dreams (1999)

Wildest Dreams is the sixth album by American country music artist John Berry. It was released on September 28, 1999, by Lyric Street Records, and his first release after exiting Capitol Records Nashville in 1998. The album includes the singles "Love Is for Giving" and "Power Windows," both of which charted on Hot Country Songs. Mark Spiro produced the album.

== History ==
Following the release of his 1996 album Faces, Berry recorded two unreleased albums for his previous label, Capitol Nashville. The first of these, Crazy for the Girl, was to have been released in 1997, but its lead-off single "The Stone" was withdrawn after Berry suffered vocal cord problems. A second, Better Than a Biscuit, was given a release date of 1998, but also went unreleased due to Berry's decision to exit the label. Both of these albums produced low-charting singles: "The Stone" from the former, and "Over My Shoulder" and "Better Than a Biscuit" from the latter.

Wildest Dreams produced two singles for Barry on the Hot Country Songs charts: "Love Is for Giving" peaked at #53, and "Power Windows" (a cover of the Billy Falcon song) at #43. Also included are covers of John Farnham's "You're the Voice" and Phil Collins's "You'll Be in My Heart."

== Critical reception ==
Charlotte Dillon of Allmusic rated the album four stars out of five, saying that its sound was closer to soft rock than country music, but praising Berry's voice and calling it a "powerful match" to the songs.

== Track listing ==
1. "Love Is for Giving" (Robert Ellis Orrall, David Tyson) – 4:57
2. "Rescued Me" (Marc-Alan Barnett, D. Vincent Williams) – 4:20
3. "Love Was Made for Us" (Michael Lunn, Jeff Silbar) – 4:22
4. "Salvation" (Gary Burr) – 4:03
5. "Where Would I Be" (Rick Bowles, Jeff Hanna, Josh Leo) – 3:49
6. "Power Windows" (Billy Falcon) – 4:14
7. "Until I'm Loving You" (Jack Blades, Burr, Soraya) – 3:24
8. "Rivers in the Clouds" (Lunn) – 3:24
9. "You'll Be in My Heart" (Phil Collins) – 3:31
10. "You're the Voice" (Andy Qunta, Keith Reid, Maggie Ryder, Chris Thompson) – 4:18
11. "The One You Love" (Stephony Smith, Jeff Wood) – 3:46

== Personnel ==
- John Berry – lead vocals
- John Hobbs – acoustic piano (1, 3, 5, 6, 9, 11), keyboards (2, 4, 7, 8, 10)
- Steve Nathan – synth strings (2, 4, 5, 7, 9, 11)
- Larry Byrom – acoustic guitars
- Jeff King – electric guitars
- Dann Huff – electric guitars (6)
- Paul Franklin – steel guitar (1, 2, 8, 9)
- Sonny Garrish – steel guitar (2, 4, 7, 8, 10)
- Dan Dugmore – steel guitar (3, 5, 6, 11)
- Wilbur Smith – autoharp (5)
- Mike Brignardello – bass
- Greg Morrow – drums (1, 3, 5, 6, 9, 11)
- Eddie Bayers – drums (2, 4, 7, 8, 10)
- Bobby Huff – drum loops (3)
- Eric Darken – percussion (3, 5)
- Larry Franklin – fiddle (3, 4, 10)
- Mark Spiro – backing vocals
- Rachel Gaines – backing vocals (8, 10)
- Amanda Omartian – backing vocals (8, 10)
- Kara Williamson – backing vocals (8, 10)

=== Production ===
- Doug Howard – A&R direction
- Shelby Kennedy – A&R direction
- Mark Spiro – producer
- Chuck Ainlay – recording, overdub recording, mixing
- Derek Bason – overdub recording
- Mark Ralston – recording assistant, mix assistant, overdub assistant
- Eric Conn – digital editing
- Carlos Grier – digital editing
- Denny Purcell – mastering at Georgetown Masters (Nashville, Tennessee)
- Jonathan Russell – mastering assistant
- Kimberly Bianco – production coordinator
- Sherri Halford – art direction
- Greg McCarn – art direction
- Glenn Sweitzer – design
- Russ Harrington – photography
- Robin Geary – hair, make-up
- Melissa Schleicher – hair, make-up
- Susie Kipp – stylist
- Firstars Management – management

== Chart performance ==
Chart (1999)	Peak position
U.S. Billboard Top Country Albums	43
Canadian RPM Country Albums	12
