= If I Had Any Pride Left at All =

Single by John Berry

from the album Standing on the Edge
- B-side: "What Are We Fighting For"
- Released: October 9, 1995
- Genre: Country
- Length: 3:43
- Label: Patriot
- Songwriters: John Greenebaum, Troy Seals, Eddie Setser
- Producers: Jimmy Bowen; Chuck Howard

John Berry singles chronology
"I Think About It All the Time" (1995)	"If I Had Any Pride Left at All" (1995)	"Every Time My Heart Calls Your Name" (1996)

"If I Had Any Pride Left at All" is a song written by John Greenebaum, Troy Seals and Eddie Setser, and recorded by American country music artist John Berry. It was released in October 1995 as the third single from the album Standing on the Edge. The song reached number 25 on the U.S. Billboard Hot Country Singles & Tracks chart but peaked at number 11 on the Canadian RPM Country Tracks chart.

== Cover versions ==
- Joe Diffie originally recorded the song on his 1993 album Honky Tonk Attitude.
- Etta James recorded her own cover of this song for her 1997 album Love's Been Rough on Me.
- Gene Watson recorded his cover of this song for his 2022 album Outside the Box.

== Critical reception ==
Larry Flick, of Billboard magazine reviewed the song favorably, saying that Berry puts his "impressive set of pipes to use on this heart wrenching ballad."

== Music video ==
The music video was directed by Deaton Flanigen and premiered in late 1995.

== Chart performance ==
"If I Had Any Pride Left at All" debuted at number 71 on the U.S. Billboard Hot Country Singles & Tracks for the week of October 21, 1995.

Chart (1995–1996)	Peak position
Canada Country Singles (RPM)	11
US Hot Country Songs (Billboard)	25

=== Year-end charts ===
Chart (1996)	Position
Canada Country Tracks (RPM)	98
