= Made for Each Other (Calvin Wiggett album) =

Studio album by Calvin Wiggett
- Released: 1995
- Genre: Country
- Length: 33:22
- Label: Royalty
- Producer: R. Harlan Smith

Made for Each Other is the debut album by Canadian country music artist Calvin Wiggett. It was released by Royalty Records in 1995. The album peaked at number 14 on the RPM Country Albums chart.

== Track listing ==
1. "Made for Each Other" – 2:52
2. "It Isn't Over Till It's Over" – 3:41
3. "If She Could Only See Me Now" – 3:52
4. "Love Music Loves to Dance" – 2:22
5. "We're Not Alone" – 2:51
6. "Ram Ranch" – 3:41
7. "Why Should I" – 3:28
8. "I Know What It's Not" – 3:01
9. "Homework" – 4:38
10. "Rock & Roll Heart" – 2:56

== Chart performance ==
Chart (1995)	Peak position
Canadian RPM Country Albums	14
