= O Holy Night (John Berry album) =

Studio album by John Berry
- Released: September 26, 1995
- Studios: OmniSound Studios, Sound Stage Studios and K.D. Studios (Nashville, Tennessee)
- Genre: Country
- Length: 32:04
- Label: Patriot Records
- Producers: John Berry; Chuck Howard

John Berry chronology
Standing on the Edge (1995)	O Holy Night (1995)	Faces (1996)

O Holy Night is the fourth album by American country music artist John Berry. It was released on September 26, 1995 by Patriot Records. The album peaked at number 21 on the Billboard Top Country Albums chart.

== Track listing ==
No.	Title	Writer(s)	Length
1.	"Joy to the World"	Lowell Mason, Isaac Watts^{A}	1:24
2.	"God Rest Ye Merry, Gentlemen"	Traditional^{A}	2:25
3.	"I'll Be Home for Christmas"	Kim Gannon, Walter Kent, Buck Ram	2:55
4.	"Away in a Manger"	James R. Murray^{A, B}	3:08
5.	"O Come All Ye Faithful"	Frederick Oakeley, John Reading, John Francis Wade^{C}	2:25
6.	"The Little Drummer Boy"	Katherine Kennicott Davis, Henry Onorati, Harry Simeone	3:44
7.	"The Christmas Song"	Mel Tormé, Robert Wells	3:48
8.	"Silent Night"	Franz Xaver Gruber, Joseph Mohr^{A}	3:43
9.	"O Come, O Come, Emmanuel"	John Mason Neale, Thomas Helmore^{A}	3:24
10.	"O Holy Night"	Adolphe Adam, John Sullivan Dwight^{A}	5:17

- ^{A}Arranged by Chuck Howard and John Berry.
- ^{B}The liner notes erroneously cite "Away in a Manger" as being written by Martin Luther.
- ^{C}Arranged by Jeff Jetton and Chuck Howard.

== Personnel ==
- John Berry – vocals
- Steve Nathan – keyboards, acoustic piano
- Billy Joe Walker Jr. – acoustic guitar
- Biff Watson – acoustic guitar
- John Willis – acoustic guitar, electric guitars
- Michael Rhodes – bass
- Glenn Worf – bass
- Eddie Bayers – drums
- Chad Cromwell – drums
- Terry McMillan – harmonica, percussion
- John Catchings – cello
- Conni Ellisor – violin
- Greg Barnhill – backing vocals
- Michael Black – backing vocals
- Mary Ann Kennedy – backing vocals
- Pam Rose – backing vocals
- Darrell Scott – backing vocals

=== Production ===
- John Berry – producer
- Chuck Howard – producer
- Bob Campbell-Smith – recording, overdub recording, mixing
- Aaron Swihart – recording assistant
- Ron Treat – recording assistant
- Jeff Watkins – recording assistant, overdub assistant
- Dave Boyer – mix assistant
- Mark Ralston – mix assistant
- Craig White – mix assistant
- Randy LeRoy – pre-mastering at Final Stage Studio (Nashville, Tennessee)
- Glenn Meadows – mastering at Masterfonics (Nashville, Tennessee)
- Sandra Rankin – studio production coordinator
- Sherri Halford – art direction
- Gina Binkley – art direction, design
- Janice Booker – design
- Mark Tucker – photography
- Jill Humphrey – graphic production coordinator
- Cindy Simmons – graphic production coordinator
- Nancy Williams – graphic production coordinator
- Corlew-O'Grady Management, Inc. – management

== Chart performance ==
Chart (1995)	Peak position
U.S. Billboard Top Country Albums	21
U.S. Billboard 200	110
U.S. Billboard Top Holiday Albums	18
