= You Have the Right to Remain Silent (song) =

Single by Perfect Stranger

from the album You Have the Right to Remain Silent
- B-side: "It's Up to You"
- Released: February 1995 (Pacific release); May 23, 1995 (Curb release)
- Genre: Country
- Length: 3:31
- Label: Curb
- Songwriters: Brenda Sweat; Cal Sweat
- Producer: Clyde Brooks

Perfect Stranger singles chronology
"Ridin' the Rodeo" (1994)	"You Have the Right to Remain Silent" (1995)	"I Am a Stranger Here Myself" (1995)

"You Have the Right to Remain Silent" is a song written by Brenda and Cal Sweat, and originally recorded by Les Taylor on his 1991 album Blue Kentucky Wind, under the title "For the Rest of Your Life". The song was later recorded by American country music group Perfect Stranger and released in February 1995 off of the independent label, Pacific Records, before the group signed to Curb Records and re-released it in May 1995 as the second single and title track from their album You Have the Right to Remain Silent. The song was their only Top 40 hit on the Billboard Hot Country Singles & Tracks chart, reaching number 4 in August 1995. It was also their only entry on the Billboard Hot 100, peaking at number 61.

== Content ==
The song is a soft, mellow ballad of a man asking a woman to have a dance with him, and says to her that she has “the right to remain silent” as they dance together. The lyrics reveal a tenderness from the man as he has waited for this dance for a lifetime.

== Chart performance ==
"You Have the Right to Remain Silent" debuted at number 75 on the U.S. Billboard Hot Country Singles & Tracks for the week of April 15, 1995.

Chart (1995)	Peak position
Canada Country Singles (RPM)	8
US Billboard Hot 100	61
US Hot Country Songs (Billboard)	4

=== Year-end charts ===
Chart (1995)	Position
US Country Songs (Billboard)	73

== Parodies ==
- American country music parody artist Cledus T. Judd released a parody of "You Have the Right to Remain Silent" titled "You Have No Right to Remain Violent" on his 1996 album I Stoled This Record.
