= Standing on the Edge (John Berry album) =

Studio album by John Berry
- Released: March 7, 1995
- Studio: Emerald Sound Studios, K.D. Studios and Sound Stage Studios (Nashville, Tennessee)
- Genre: Country
- Length: 39:05
- Label: Patriot Records
- Producer: Jimmy Bowen (all tracks except 8 & 11) Chuck Howard (all tracks)

John Berry chronology
John Berry (1993)	Standing on the Edge (1995)	O Holy Night (1995)

Singles from Standing on the Edge
- 1. "Standing on the Edge of Goodbye" Released: February 17, 1995; 2. "I Think About It All the Time" Released: June 26, 1995; 3. "If I Had Any Pride Left at All" Released: October 9, 1995; 4. "Every Time My Heart Calls Your Name" Released: February 14, 1996

Standing on the Edge is the third studio album by American country music artist John Berry. It was released on March 7, 1995 by Patriot Records. It peaked at number 12 on the Top Country Albums chart, and was certified Gold by the Recording Industry Association of America. The album includes the singles "Every Time My Heart Calls Your Name", "Standing on the Edge of Goodbye", "I Think About It All the Time" and "If I Had Any Pride Left at All", as well as a cover of Hank Snow's 1963 single "Ninety Miles an Hour."

Jim Ridley of New Country magazine gave the album three stars out of five. His review compares Berry's "anthemic songs of passion and romance" to the works of Meat Loaf, citing "Every Time My Heart Calls Your Name" and "If I Had Any Pride Left at All" as standouts, but calling "There's No Cross That Love Won't Bear" "the most godawful four minutes of lachrymose drivel since[…]the last big social statement song."

== Track listing ==
No.	Title	Writer(s)	Length
1.	"Every Time My Heart Calls Your Name"	Gary Heyde, J. B. Rudd	3:08
2.	"Standing on the Edge of Goodbye"	John Berry, Stewart Harris	4:04
3.	"Prove Me Wrong"	Vince Gill, Don Schlitz	3:17
4.	"I Think About It All the Time"	Billy Livsey, Schlitz	3:40
5.	"If I Had Any Pride Left at All"	John Greenebaum, Troy Seals, Eddie Setser	3:43
6.	"Desperate Measures"	Chuck Jones, Gregory Swint	3:06
7.	"What Are We Fighting For"	Keith Follesé, Ronnie Guilbeau, Thom McHugh	2:49
8.	"There's No Cross That Love Won't Bear"	Jones, Allen Shamblin	3:53
9.	"Ninety Miles an Hour (Down a Dead End Street)"	Hal Blair, Don Robertson	3:04
10.	"I Never Lost You"	Jones	4:21
11.	"You and Only You"	Jones, J. D. Martin	4:00

== Personnel ==
- John Berry – lead vocals
- Tony Harrell – Wurlitzer electric piano (1–7, 9, 10), organ (1–7, 9, 10)
- John Hobbs – acoustic piano (1–7, 9, 10)
- John Barlow Jarvis – acoustic piano (1–7, 9, 10)
- Bill Cuomo – keyboards (8, 11)
- Kerry Marx – electric guitar (1–7, 9, 10)
- John Willis – electric guitar (1–7, 9, 10)
- Reggie Young – electric guitar (1–7, 9, 10)
- Michael Spriggs – acoustic guitar (1–7, 9, 10)
- Billy Joe Walker Jr. – acoustic guitar (1–7, 9, 10)
- Chuck Jones – electric guitar (8, 11)
- Biff Watson – acoustic guitar (8, 11)
- Dan Dugmore – steel guitar, lap steel guitar (1–7, 9, 10), dobro (1–7, 9, 10)
- Glenn Worf – bass (1–7, 9, 10)
- Willie Weeks – bass (8)
- Michael Rhodes – bass (11)
- Kenny Aronoff – drums (1–7, 9, 10)
- Lonnie Wilson – drums (1–7, 9, 10)
- Eddie Bayers – drums (8, 11)
- Terry McMillan – percussion (1–7, 9, 10)
- Greg Barnhill – backing vocals
- Mary Ann Kennedy – backing vocals
- Darrell Scott – backing vocals
- Billy Thomas – backing vocals
- Neil Thrasher – backing vocals

=== Production ===
- Bob Campbell-Smith – recording, overdub recording
- John Kelton – recording, mixing
- Ron Treat – overdub recording
- Russ Martin – recording assistant
- Paula Montonado – recording assistant, mix assistant
- Craig White – mix assistant
- Glenn Meadows – mastering at Masterfonics (Nashville, Tennessee)
- Sandra Rankin – production assistant
- Sherri Halford – art direction
- Julianna Maxwell – art direction
- J Hammond Design – design
- Mark Tucker – photography
- Debra Wingo – hair, make-up
- Emily Jane Kitos – wardrobe

== Charts ==
=== Weekly charts ===
Chart (1995)	Peak position
Canadian Country Albums (RPM)	9
Canadian Albums (RPM)	48
US Billboard 200	69
US Top Country Albums (Billboard)	12

=== Year-end charts ===
Chart (1995)	Position
US Top Country Albums (Billboard)	47
Chart (1996)	Position
US Top Country Albums (Billboard)	72

== Certifications ==
Region	Certification	Certified units/sales
Canada (Music Canada)	Gold	50,000^{^}
United States (RIAA)	Gold	500,000^{^}
^{^} Shipments figures based on certification alone.
