= 4 Runner (album) =

Studio album by 4 Runner
- Released: May 9, 1995
- Genre: Country
- Label: Polydor Nashville
- Producer: Buddy Cannon, Larry Shell

4 Runner chronology
4 Runner (1995)	Getaway Car (2003)

Singles from 4 Runner
- 1. "Cain's Blood" Released: February 1995; 2. "A Heart with 4 Wheel Drive" Released: June 1995; 3. "Home Alone" Released: October 1995; 4. "Ripples" Released: March 1996

4 Runner is the debut studio album by American country music group 4 Runner, released on May 9, 1995 on the Nashville division of Polydor Records. It produced the singles "Cain's Blood", "A Heart with 4 Wheel Drive", "Home Alone", and "Ripples", all of which charted on the Billboard Hot Country Singles & Tracks (now Hot Country Songs charts. Of these four singles, "Cain's Blood" was the only one to chart within the Top 40, peaking at #26.

== Critical reception ==
Brian Wahlert of Country Standard Time criticized some of the songs on 4 Runner for "cop[ying] the worst pop elements" of The Oak Ridge Boys, but said that the presence of bass singer Jim Chapman gave the material a "fresh sound." His review praised "Cain's Blood" and "A Heart with 4 Wheel Drive" as the strongest tracks. Entertainment Weekly critic Alanna Nash gave the album a B-minus rating. In her review, she said that "they can be as hokey as the Oaks, but unlike the Statlers, they're sentimental without being mawkish."

== Track listing ==
No.	Title	Writer(s)	Length
1.	"A Heart with 4 Wheel Drive"	Billy Maddox, Paul Thorn	3:42
2.	"Good Lookin'"	Chris East, Mickey Jupp	2:53
3.	"Cain's Blood"	Michael Johnson, Jack Sundrud	3:52
4.	"The House at the End of the Road"	Rock Killough, Larry T. Wilson	3:36
5.	"Ripples"	Tony Haselden	3:25
6.	"You Make the Moonlight"	Chris Waters, Tom Shapiro	2:51
7.	"Oh No"	Al Anderson, Mike Lawler	3:55
8.	"Let the Good Times Roll"	Tony Martin, Reese Wilson	3:31
9.	"Home Alone"	Dennis Wilson, Craig Morris	2:30
10.	"Southern Wind"	Walt Aldridge, James Hooker	4:26

== Personnel ==
4 Runner

- Jim Chapman – bass vocals
- Billy Crittenden – baritone vocals
- Lee Hilliard – tenor vocals
- Craig Morris – lead vocals

Additional musicians

- Glen Duncan – fiddle
- Larry Franklin – fiddle
- Sonny Garrish – Dobro, steel guitar
- Tony Haselden – acoustic guitar
- John Hobbs – piano
- Mike Lawler – synthesizer
- Paul Leim – drums
- Brent Mason – electric guitar
- Terry McMillan – harmonica
- Steve Nathan – organ, piano, synthesizer
- Danny Parks – acoustic guitar
- Larry Paxton – bass guitar
- Don Potter – acoustic guitar
- Matt Rollings – piano
- Reggie Young – electric guitar

All strings performed by the Nashville String Machine under the conduction of Carl Gorodetzky.

== Charts ==
Chart (1995)	Peak position
US Billboard 200	144
US Billboard Top Country Albums	27
US Billboard Top Heatseekers	3
Canada RPM Country Albums	7
