= I Think About It All the Time =

Single by John Berry

from the album Standing on the Edge
- Released: June 26, 1995
- Genre: Country
- Length: 3:40
- Label: Patriot
- Songwriters: Billy Livsey, Don Schlitz
- Producers: Jimmy Bowen; Chuck Howard

John Berry singles chronology
"Standing on the Edge of Goodbye" (1995)	"I Think About It All the Time" (1995)	"If I Had Any Pride Left at All" (1995)

"I Think About It All the Time" is a song written by Billy Livsey and Don Schlitz, and recorded by American country music artist John Berry. It was released in June 1995 as the second single from the album Standing on the Edge. The song reached number 4 on the Billboard Hot Country Singles & Tracks chart.

== Chart performance ==
"I Think About It All the Time" debuted at number 59 on the U.S. Billboard Hot Country Singles & Tracks for the week of July 8, 1995.

Chart (1995)	Peak position
Canada Country Singles (RPM)	4
US Hot Country Songs (Billboard)	4

=== Year-end charts ===
Chart (1995)	Position
Canada Country Tracks (RPM)	63
US Country Songs (Billboard)	47
