= Your Love Amazes Me =

Single by John Berry

from the album John Berry
- B-side: "What's in It for Me"
- Released: January 31, 1994
- Genre: Country
- Length: 3:53
- Label: Liberty/Patriot
- Songwriters: Amanda Hunt-Taylor, Chuck Jones
- Producer: Chuck Howard

John Berry singles chronology
"Kiss Me in the Car" (1993)	"Your Love Amazes Me" (1994)	"What's in It for Me" (1994)

"Your Love Amazes Me" is a song written by Amanda Hunt-Taylor and Chuck Jones and recorded by American country music singer John Berry. It was released in January 1994 as the third single from the album John Berry. It is his only Number One single on the Hot Country Singles & Tracks (now Hot Country Songs) chart, and the first of two Number Ones for him on the Canadian RPM Country Tracks charts. A cover version was released in 1996 by Contemporary Christian singer Michael English. Andy Childs also recorded it on his 1993 self-titled album and released it as the B-side to his 1993 single "Broken."

== Critical reception ==
Larry Flick, of Billboard magazine reviewed the song favorably, saying that it is "a nice showcase for Berry's unique, country/soul voice." He goes on to call it a "heartfelt performance."

== Music video ==
The music video was directed by John Lloyd Miller and premiered in early 1994.

== Chart positions ==
=== John Berry ===
"Your Love Amazes Me" debuted at number 67 on the U.S. Billboard Hot Country Singles & Tracks for the week of February 12, 1994.

Chart (1994)	Peak position
Canada Country Singles (RPM)	1
US Hot Country Songs (Billboard)	1

==== Year-end charts ====
Chart (1994)	Position
Canada Country Tracks (RPM)	30
US Country Songs (Billboard)	41

=== Michael English ===
Chart (1996)	Peak position
U.S. Billboard Hot Adult Contemporary Tracks	10
U.S. Billboard Bubbling Under Hot 100	5
