= What's in It for Me (John Berry song) =

Single by John Berry

from the album John Berry
- Released: June 13, 1993
- Genre: Country
- Length: 3:19
- Label: Liberty
- Songwriters: Gary Burr, John Jarrard
- Producer: Chuck Howard

John Berry singles chronology
"Your Love Amazes Me" (1994)	"What's in It for Me" (1993)	"You and Only You" (1994)

"What's in It for Me" is a song written by Gary Burr and John Jarrard, and recorded by American country music artist John Berry. It was released in June 1994 as the fourth single from the album John Berry. The song reached number 5 on the U.S. Billboard Hot Country Singles & Tracks chart and peaked at number 2 on the Canadian RPM Country Tracks chart.

== Critical reception ==
Larry Flick, of Billboard magazine reviewed the song favorably, saying that Berry "proves here that he can up the tempo without sacrificing the intimacy or intensity of his performance." He goes on to say that this single should convince listeners and programmers that Berry is not a one-hit wonder.

== Chart performance ==
"What's in It for Me" debuted at number 66 on the U.S. Billboard Hot Country Singles & Tracks for the week of June 25, 1994.

Chart (1994)	Peak position
Canada Country Singles (RPM)	2
US Bubbling Under Hot 100 (Billboard)	20
US Hot Country Songs (Billboard)	5

=== Year-end charts ===
Chart (1994)	Position
Canada Country Tracks (RPM)	10
US Country Songs (Billboard)	65
