= Cain's Blood =

Single by 4 Runner

from the album 4 Runner
- B-side: "Ten Pound Hammer"
- Released: February 1995
- Recorded: September 1994
- Genre: Country
- Length: 3:52
- Label: Polydor
- Songwriters: Michael Johnson, Jack Sundrud
- Producers: Buddy Cannon, Larry Shell

4 Runner singles chronology
"Cain's Blood" (1995)	"A Heart with 4 Wheel Drive" (1995)

"Cain's Blood" is a song originally recorded by American country pop artist Michael Johnson. He co-wrote the song with Jack Sundrud and recorded it on his 1995 album Departure. It was recorded the same year by the country vocal group 4 Runner, whose version was released as their debut single from their album 4 Runner. 4 Runner's version of the song reached number 26 on the US Billboard Hot Country Singles & Tracks chart.

== Content ==
The song is about "the tug and pull [between good and evil] that goes on inside each and every one of us", according to Polydor Records then-president Steve Miller. It uses the Biblical story of Cain and Abel to represent the narrator's struggle between good and evil. Co-writer Michael Johnson said that the idea for the chorus came to him while he was in jail for driving under the influence. Johnson himself also recorded the song on his 1995 album Departure.

== Music video ==
The music video premiered in February 1995. It was filmed at the Hawaii Volcanoes National Park.

== Critical reception ==
"Cain's Blood" generally received positive reception for its Southern gospel sound. The single was also compared to the sound of The Oak Ridge Boys due to the use of four-part vocal harmony. Brian Wahlert of Country Standard Time wrote that the song is a "dark and moody testament to life's daily battle between good and evil in which the four voices become completely integrated into an eerie, foreboding whole."

== Chart performance ==
"Cain's Blood" debuted at number 74 on the U.S. Billboard Hot Country Singles & Tracks for the week of March 18, 1995.

Chart (1995)	Peak position
Canada Country Singles (RPM)	14
US Bubbling Under Hot 100 (Billboard)	18
US Hot Country Songs (Billboard)	26
