= You Have the Right to Remain Silent (album) =

Studio album by Perfect Stranger
- Released: June 13, 1995
- Recorded: 1994
- Studio: Ardent Studios, Memphis, TN, Quad Studios, Sanctuary, Sixteenth Avenue Sound, Sound Stage Studios, and Treasure Isle Studios Nashville, TN
- Genre: Country
- Length: 31:23
- Label: Curb
- Producer: Clyde Brooks

Perfect Stranger chronology
It's Up to You (1994)	You Have the Right to Remain Silent (1995)	The Hits (2001)

You Have the Right to Remain Silent is the second studio album by American country music group Perfect Stranger. It was released on June 13, 1995, via Curb Records. The album includes the singles "Ridin' the Rodeo", "You Have the Right to Remain Silent", "I'm a Stranger Here Myself" and "Remember the Ride".

"You Have the Right to Remain Silent" was previously cut by Les Taylor, former ex-member of Exile, for his 1991 Epic album, Blue Kentucky Wind, and was originally titled, "For the Rest of Your Life". "Remember the Ride" was also originally cut by Doug Stone on his 1991 album, I Thought It Was You. "Ridin' the Rodeo" was originally cut by its co-writer, Vince Gill, on his 1989 album, When I Call Your Name. "I Ain't Never" has been previously cut by both Mel Tillis and Webb Pierce, the song's writers. Pierce's version came out in 1959, and Tillis' version was released in 1972.

== Track listing ==
No.	Title	Writer(s)	Length
1.	"Remember the Ride"	Michael Harrell, Kim Williams	3:20
2.	"It's Up to You"	Jim Lauderdale, Gary Nicholson	2:37
3.	"One More Repossession"	Williams, Oscar Turman	2:32
4.	"You Have the Right to Remain Silent"	Cal Sweat, Brenda Sweat	3:31
5.	"Ridin' the Rodeo"	Vince Gill, Kostas	3:02
6.	"I Ain't Never"	Mel Tillis, Webb Pierce	2:43
7.	"Who Are You"	Bobby Carmichael, Gary Cotton, Cindy Greene	3:07
8.	"Cut Me Off"	Gerald Smith, Wynn Varble, Richard Fagan	2:50
9.	"I'm a Stranger Here Myself"	Dave Lindsey, Matt Lindsey, Michael Keith	4:00
10.	"Even the Jukebox Can't Forget"	Trey Bruce, Craig Wiseman	3:41

== Chart performance ==
Chart (1995)	Peak position
US Billboard 200	68
US Top Country Albums (Billboard)	7
Canadian RPM Country Albums	13
