= Power Windows (song) =

Single by Billy Falcon

from the album Pretty Blue World
- B-side: "Oh Boy"
- Released: July 16, 1991
- Recorded: 1991
- Genre: Rock
- Length: 4:04
- Label: Jambco/Mercury
- Songwriter: Billy Falcon
- Producers: Jon Bon Jovi, Danny Kortchmar

Billy Falcon singles chronology
"Power Windows" (1991)	"Heaven's Highest Hill" (1991)

"Power Windows" is a song written and recorded by singer Billy Falcon for his 1991 major label debut album Pretty Blue World.

The song's lyrics discuss two characters, Charlie and Louis. Charlie has material wealth, e.g. "power windows" and "power brakes," but lacks "the power of love" and is therefore unhappy. The opposite is true of Louis, who's "got no power windows" but does have "the power of love" and is happy for it. The general message is that love is more important than material wealth. The song was Falcon's only hit to date on the Billboard Hot 100, peaking at #35 on the chart.

In 1999, John Berry covered the song on his album Wildest Dreams. His cover of the song peaked at #43 on the Hot Country Songs charts.

== Charts ==
Chart (1991)	Peak position
US Billboard Hot 100	35
US Cash Box Top 100	31
