= 4 Runner =

American country music vocal group

- Origin: Nashville, Tennessee, U.S.
- Genres: Country
- Years active: 1993–1996; 2002–2005; 2023–present
- Labels: Polydor Nashville; A&M; Fresh; BFD/Audium Nashville
- Members: Craig Morris; Jim Chapman; Sam Morris; Herbie Chapman
- Past members: Billy Crittenden; Billy Simon; Michael Lusk

4 Runner (sometimes stylized as 4Runner) is an American country music vocal group founded in 1993 in Nashville. The group initially consisted of Craig Morris (lead vocals, piano), Billy Crittenden (baritone vocals), Lee Hilliard (tenor vocals), and Jim Chapman (bass vocals). Signed to Polydor Records Nashville, the quartet released its self-titled debut album in 1995. It featured four charting singles on Hot Country Songs, the most successful being "Cain's Blood" at No. 26. Billy Simon took Crittenden's place just before a second album for A&M Records, which was not released despite producing a chart single, and the group broke up afterward. Morris, Chapman, and Hilliard reunited with third baritone singer Michael Lusk to release their next album, Getaway Car, on the Fresh label before disbanding a second time. The group reunited a second time in 2023 with a lineup consisting of Morris, Chapman, Hilliard, and Morris's son Sam. Shortly after their reunion, Hilliard left as well, with Herbie Chapman taking his place.

== Background ==
4 Runner was founded in Nashville in 1993 by Jim Chapman (bass vocals), Billy Crittenden (baritone vocals), Lee Hilliard (tenor vocals), and Craig Morris (lead vocals, piano). Crittenden was a former backing vocalist for Tanya Tucker, and Chapman is the brother-in-law of Christian singer Steven Curtis Chapman. In 1994, Diamond Rio had a Top 5 country hit with "Love a Little Stronger", which Billy Crittenden co-wrote, while Morris co-wrote "If I Had Only Known", an album cut for Reba McEntire. The group recorded a demo tape which was given to songwriter Larry Shell, who then submitted it to Mercury Records' Nashville branch. When that label chose to create a new division of Polydor Records for the country genre, 4 Runner was then signed to Polydor Nashville that year. Before releasing any material of their own, they sang backing vocals on then-labelmate Amie Comeaux's late-1994 debut album Moving Out.

"Cain's Blood", co-written by Michael Johnson and former Poco and Great Plains member Jack Sundrud, was issued as the lead single in early 1995. It reached a peak of No. 26 on the Billboard country music charts and No. 14 on the RPM country charts in Canada. The song also had a music video filmed at Hawaiʻi Volcanoes National Park on the island of Hawaii which was put into medium rotation on CMT. On the success of the single, the group's self-titled debut album was issued in May 1995. Four sides were cut for the album in September 1994, one of which was "Cain's Blood", and the rest of the album was then recorded between January and March 1995. Buddy Cannon, who produced the album with Shell, noted that he did not attempt to change the "vocal blend" present on the group's demo tape, and thus spent more time focusing on the musical arrangements and song selection. He also noted that the use of four-part vocal harmony made it more difficult to find suitable songs, compared to other country music groups where the vocal harmony is not as prominent. Polydor promoted the group via a showcase in Marina del Rey which is next to Venice, Los Angeles in which they and then-labelmates Chely Wright and Shane Sutton, performed before 80 radio representatives and 100 representatives of PolyGram Distribution. Three more singles were issued from 4 Runner: "A Heart with 4 Wheel Drive", "Home Alone", and "Ripples". While none of these reached Top 40 on the U.S. country music charts, "A Heart with 4 Wheel Drive" made No. 18 on the RPM Country Tracks charts in Canada.

Crittenden quit the group in October 1995 to focus more on a recording studio and publishing company which he owned at the time. He was replaced by Billy Simon, who made his debut at a concert in Pine Bluff southeast of Little Rock, Arkansas in the same month. Due to a restructuring of Polydor Nashville, 4Runner was transferred to A&M Records Nashville for what would have been its second album, One for the Ages. The lead single was "That Was Him (This Is Now)", written by Keith Urban and Vernon Rust. Although this song entered the country charts, the album itself was not released due to the closure of Polydor/A&M's Nashville unit. 4Runner soon disbanded. During the group's hiatus, Chapman sang backing vocals on Chad Brock's 1998 self-titled debut album.

=== Reunion, second disbanding, and second reunion ===
Chapman, Hilliard, and Morris re-established 4 Runner in 2003, with Michael Lusk becoming the group's third baritone vocalist. They released an a cappella rendition of the Christmas song "What Child Is This?" late that year. A second album, Getaway Car, was released in 2003, producing a No. 59 single on the country charts with "Forrest County Line". The title track was later released by both The Jenkins and Hall & Oates. 4 Runner also provided background vocals on Craig Morgan's 2003 single "God, Family, and Country", which they also recorded on Getaway Car; also included on the album was their own version of "Love a Little Stronger". Shortly after Getaway Car was recorded, a single called "We Will Hope With You" was released although it was never put on an album.

4 Runner disbanded again after Getaway Car, and all four members joined Loretta Lynn's road band. Crittenden married songwriter Pam "Sunny" Russ and worked as a real estate agent in Missoula, Montana.

In 2023, 4 Runner reunited a second time with Morris, Hilliard, Chapman, and Morris' son, Sam. The quartet released a new album Back Runnin' on March 31 of the same year through BFD/Audium Nashville. It includes re-recordings of "Cain's Blood" and "The House at the End of the Road", a track from their self-titled debut. Shortly after the album, Hilliard exited the group as well, with Jim Chapman's brother in law Herbie Chapman taking his place.

== Discography ==
=== Albums ===
Title	Album details	Peak chart positions			
Title	Album details	US Country	US	US Heat	CAN Country
4 Runner	Release date: May 9, 1995; Label: Polydor Nashville	27	144	3	7
Getaway Car	Release date: July 15, 2003; Label: Fresh	—	—	—	—
Back Runnin'	Release date: March 31, 2023; Label: BFD/Audium Nashville	—	—	—	—
"—" denotes releases that did not chart

=== Singles ===
Year	Single	Peak chart positions			Album
Year	Single	US Country	US Bubbling	CAN Country	Album
1995	"Cain's Blood"	26	18	14	4 Runner
1995	"A Heart with 4 Wheel Drive"	51	—	18	4 Runner
1995	"Home Alone"	65	—	83	4 Runner
1996	"Ripples"	57	—	82	4 Runner
1996	"That Was Him (This Is Now)"	54	—	—	One for the Ages (unreleased)
2002	"What Child Is This?"	—	—	×	Non-album single
2003	"Getaway Car"	—	—	×	Getaway Car
2003	"Forrest County Line"	59	—	×	Getaway Car
2004	"Ragged Angel"	—	—	—	Getaway Car
2005	"We Will Hope with You"	—	—	—	Non-album single
"—" denotes releases that did not chart "×" indicates that no relevant chart existed or was archived

=== Music videos ===
Year	Title	Director
1995	"Cain's Blood"	
1995	"A Heart with 4 Wheel Drive"	
1995	"Home Alone"	
1996	"Ripples"	
2002	"What Child Is This?"	Glenn Sweitzer
2003	"Getaway Car"	
2003	"Forrest County Line"	Glenn Sweitzer
2004	"One Ragged Angel"	Glenn Sweitzer

== Awards and nominations ==
Year	Organization	Award	Nominee/Work	Result
1996	Academy of Country Music Awards	Top New Vocal Group or Duet	4 Runner	Nominated
