= You and Only You =

Single by John Berry

from the album John Berry
- B-side: "More Sorry Than You'll Ever Know"
- Released: October 3, 1994
- Genre: Country
- Length: 4:00
- Label: Liberty
- Songwriters: J.D. Martin, Chuck Jones
- Producer: Chuck Howard

John Berry singles chronology
| "What's in It for Me" (1994) | "You and Only You" (1994) | "Standing on the Edge of Goodbye" (1995) |

"You and Only You" is a song written by J.D. Martin and Chuck Jones, and recorded by American country music artist John Berry. It was released in October 1994 as the fifth single from the album John Berry. The song peaked at number 4 on the U.S.Billboard Hot Country Singles & Tracks chart and reached number-one on the Canadian RPM Country Tracks chart.

== Music video ==
The music video was directed by Michael McNamara and premiered in October 1994, and it features Berry performing the song live with his band.

== Chart performance ==
"You and Only You" debuted at number 66 on the U.S. Billboard Hot Country Singles & Tracks for the week of October 15, 1994.

| Chart (1994–1995) | Peak position |
|---|---|
| Canada Country Singles (RPM) | 1 |
| US Hot Country Songs (Billboard) | 4 |

=== Year-end charts ===
| Chart (1995) | Position |
|---|---|
| Canada Country Tracks (RPM) | 8 |
