= Standing on the Edge of Goodbye =

Single by John Berry

from the album Standing on the Edge
- B-side: "Ninety Miles an Hour"
- Released: February 14, 1995
- Genre: Country
- Length: 4:04
- Label: Patriot
- Songwriters: John Berry, Stewart Harris
- Producers: Jimmy Bowen; Chuck Howard

John Berry singles chronology
"You and Only You" (1994)	"Standing on the Edge of Goodbye" (1995)	"I Think About It All the Time" (1995)

"Standing on the Edge of Goodbye" is a song co-written and recorded by American country music artist John Berry. It was released in February 1995 as the first single from the album Standing on the Edge. The song reached number 2 on the Billboard Hot Country Singles & Tracks chart. It was written by Berry and Stewart Harris.

== Content ==
Berry wrote the song with Stewart Harris, a Nashville songwriter with whom he had never worked before. The song is composed in the key of B-flat major, and recalls an ending relationship which the narrator calls "standing on the edge of goodbye".

== Critical reception ==
Billboard magazine reviewed the song favorably, saying that Berry "picks up the tempo but continues to travel down the same country/soul road that got him where he is." and that it "showcases some solid writing chops."

== Music video ==
The music video was directed by John Lloyd Miller and premiered in early 1995.

== Chart performance ==
"Standing on the Edge of Goodbye" debuted at number 73 on the U.S. Billboard Hot Country Singles & Tracks for the week of March 4, 1995.

Chart (1995)	Peak position
Canada Country Singles (RPM)	6
US Hot Country Songs (Billboard)	2

=== Year-end charts ===
Chart (1995)	Position
Canada Country Tracks (RPM)	53
US Country Songs (Billboard)	33
