= John Berry (country singer) =

American singer (born 1959)

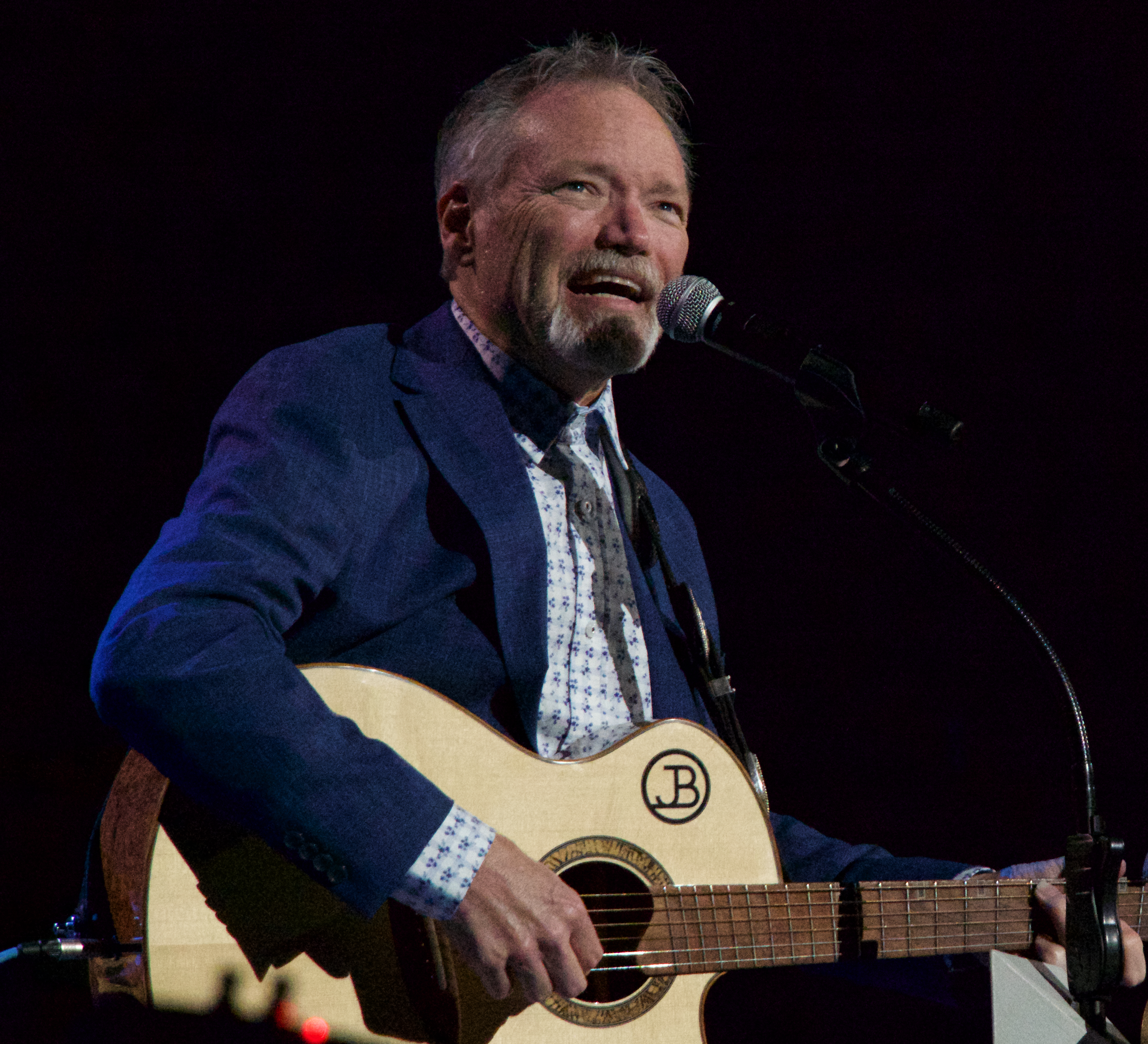
- Berry performing at the Ryman Auditorium in 2022.

Background information
- Born: John Edward Berry; September 14, 1959 (age 67); Aiken, South Carolina, U.S.
- Origin: Nashville, Tennessee, U.S.
- Genre: Country
- Occupations: Singer, songwriter
- Instruments: Vocals, acoustic guitar
- Years active: 1979–present
- Labels: Liberty; Patriot; Capitol Nashville; Lyric Street; Clear Sky
- Website: www.johnberry.com

John Edward Berry (born September 14, 1959) is an American country musician. Active as a recording artist since 1979, he has recorded more than 20 studio albums, including one platinum album and two gold albums. In his career, Berry has also charted 19 songs on the Billboard Hot Country Songs chart, including the number one single "Your Love Amazes Me" from 1994 and six additional top 10 hits: "What's in It for Me", "You and Only You", "Standing on the Edge of Goodbye", "I Think About It All the Time", "Change My Mind", and "She's Taken a Shine".

A Country Weekly article said of Berry, "John's greatest strength is his pure, soulful tenor." A 2006 interview with The Entertainment Nexus described him as "one of the most remarkable voices in music."

== Biography ==
John Edward Berry was born on September 14, 1959, in Aiken, South Carolina, to James and Marie Berry, and raised in the Atlanta, Georgia, area. He was exposed to a variety of music, as his father preferred Van Cliburn and his mother, gospel. Berry grew up listening to an AM station from Atlanta; "It was on in dad's garage constantly, WQXI 79 AM." Berry says. "They played a pretty eclectic selection, country and Top 40 in the 1970s."

Berry began learning the guitar in 1972 (at the age of 12); he has named influences such as James Taylor, Harry Chapin, and, his favorite, John Denver. In a 2006 interview he said: "Prior to playing guitar, I really loved the “Philly Soul Sound” like The Chi-Lites and The Stylistics." Berry moved to soul, gospel, and country music and began recording his own albums at home in 1979.

In 1981, at age 21, while riding his motorcycle, Berry was hit by a car, breaking both legs and his left hip. He had just lost his mother earlier that year. Doctors were afraid that he might not walk again. He spent several months in physical therapy, working to regain the use of his legs. Berry said of the incident, "The coolest thing in the world that came out of it... all I could do is sit on my stool and play guitar. That's all I've done ever since."

Two years later, Berry started performing solo acoustic shows in northeast Georgia (Athens), then expanded around the Southeast, building a strong name and following. He eventually made six self-produced albums, with the last one selling over 10,000 copies. He was finally signed to Liberty Records in 1992. Berry received high praise from former president George H. W. Bush and wife Barbara when she invited him to sing for Pres. Bush's birthday party.

Early in 1994, Berry began to have terrible headaches, lost his appetite, and finally blacked out during a concert. He was rushed to the hospital on May 9, 1994, in Atlanta, where a cyst was found in the third ventricle of his brain. He stated: "They went in with a fiber optic camera and laser, and removed it. I still suffer a little from short-term memory loss. This is a rebirth of sorts and I am into that". He uses humor when he occasionally forgets the words to a song and his wife, Robin, uses sign language to assist him. The same day he underwent brain surgery, he celebrated his first No. 1 single, "Your Love Amazes Me", from his hospital bed in Atlanta.

In 1997, a year before recording his Wildest Dreams album (released in 1999), Berry again had surgery, for nodes on his vocal cords.

== Career ==
John Berry started playing after Bulldog home football games, at college clubs and bars in Athens, in 1985. He self-released six albums, soon becoming a local and regional celebrity. Berry worked on his music for almost ten years, and built a substantial following among students at the University of Georgia. He even started his own record company to produce and distribute recordings of his songs for local fans. Berry also hosted benefit concerts for local charities around his home.

=== 1992—1998: Liberty/Patriot Records and Capitol Records ===
Berry released his self-titled major-label debut 1993 on Liberty Records. This album produced five chart singles for Berry. First was "A Mind of Her Own" at No. 55 on the Billboard country chart, followed by the No. 22 "Kiss Me in the Car". With his first major album in the stores, Berry went on the road with a major concert tour opening for the likes of Reba McEntire, Aaron Tippin, and The Mavericks. Next came "Your Love Amazes Me", which in 1994 became his only US Number One hit. Following it were the No. 5 "What's in It for Me" (originally the b-side to "Your Love Amazes Me") and the No. 4 "You and Only You", the latter of which hit Number One on the RPM country chart in Canada. John Berry was certified platinum by both the Recording Industry Association of America and Canadian Recording Industry Association.

By 1994, he was moved to Liberty's sister label, Patriot Records. That same year, Patriot re-issued two of Berry's independent albums, Saddle the Wind and Things Are Not the Same. His 1994 hit, "Your Love Amazes Me", received a Grammy nomination. In addition to the Grammy nomination, he also received several Country Music Association CMA nominations that same year, winning the "Horizon Award" for the best new artist.

In 1995, he released Standing on the Edge for Patriot. Its lead-off single, "Standing on the Edge of Goodbye", was a No. 2 hit for him that year, and was followed by the No. 4 "I Think About It All the Time". The other two singles — "If I Had Any Pride Left at All" and "Every Time My Heart Calls Your Name" — did not reach Top 20 in the US, but did in Canada. This album was certified gold in both countries. A Christmas album entitled O Holy Night was also released in 1995, also on Patriot. In a memorable performance at the 1995 Country Music Awards, John sang "If I Had Any Pride Left At All", with nothing but his acoustic guitar.

After the closure of Patriot Records in 1995, Berry was transferred to Capitol Records Nashville (the parent company of Liberty) for his third major-label album, 1996's Faces. Lead-off single "Change My Mind" peaked at No. 10 in 1996. Following it was his final Top Ten hit in the US, the No. 2 "She's Taken a Shine", and finally his last US Top 40 hit, "I Will, If You Will". The album was his final album to receive a gold certification from the RIAA.

An additional album for Capitol, Crazy for the Girl, was slated for release in 1997 but delayed due to his vocal cord surgery.

In 1998, he charted two more singles for Capitol, which were to have been included on an album titled Better Than a Biscuit: "Over My Shoulder" and the title track, which spent only one week on the country chart. He left the label in August 1998, and Better Than a Biscuit was not generally released.

=== 1999—2013 ===
Berry signed to Lyric Street Records in 1999 to release his next album, Wildest Dreams. It included the singles "Love Is for Giving" and "Power Windows" (a cover of the Billy Falcon song). Neither single made Top 40 on the country music charts.

Berry's next album, 2001's All the Way to There, was issued on the independent Ark 21 label. His album Songs And Stories was released in May 2002. This live, two-disc CD highlighted his story telling abilities. In 2004, he founded his own label, "Clear Sky", on which his next two albums, 2004's I Give My Heart and 2007's Those Were the Days, were issued. In 2008, Berry self-published his music through independent digital distributor "Speakerheart." His debut album is worth thousands

In 2012, Berry released his twentieth recording, and his first Christian project "RealMan RealLife RealGod". The lead single, Real Man, was penned by Berry, Mac McAnally and Lenny LaBlanc. John Berry also penned the politically themed anthem entitled "Give Me Back My America" that has been included in Berry's live shows for several years. The video was released in July 2012.

Also in 2012 John Berry released a book/cd entitled Songs and Stories.

=== 2014—present ===
Since 2017, Berry has hosted Songs and Stories with John Berry, a television series in which Berry interviews musical guests, mostly country musicians. The series is filmed in Nashville and is carried on Heartland, The Country Network and AMGTV.

In 2018, John Berry released the song "Beautifully Broken" for the inspirational movie with the same title. The movie debuted on August 24, 2018, and Berry walked the Red Carpet at the Nashville premiere.

=== Christmas tours ===
Berry embarked on his 2010, 12th Annual Christmas Tour. The hour and a half show was filled with traditional Christmas songs (including an a cappella version of "O Holy Night") and his childhood stories. Plans are already in the works for the 2011 tour.

John Berry will have his 22nd Annual Christmas Tour kicking off in Marietta, GA, on November 16, 2018. Tickets are on-sale now.

== Charity work ==
Berry is involved in charitable causes including children's diseases, The American Red Cross, and cystic fibrosis, as well as lending his name to adult literacy causes and Haven Hospice. He performed a benefit concert for a young kidney transplant recipient on October 16, 2008. His third charity fundraiser wac the New Montcalm County 4-H Fair at Greenville High School, in Greenville, Michigan, in December 2010. He gave a free concert at the Greene County Relay for Life on June 18, 2010. He performs yearly, in Florida at the annual Newberry Watermelon Festival which benefits the American Legion.

Berry has at least two charity performances scheduled for his popular Christmas tour. A show benefitting "Challenged Child and Friends" is scheduled for November 26 at the Pearce Auditorium in Gainesville, Georgia. Another "John Berry Christmas Concert" for charity is scheduled for November 27 in Toccoa, Georgia.

== Personal life ==
Berry often performs with his wife of 25 years, Robin, as his backup singer. They have three children: a daughter, Taylor Marie (born January 24, 1990) and two sons, Sean Thomas (born April 28, 1994) and Caelan James (born June 21, 1995). He wrote a song, "Sanctuary", dedicated to Robin. It contains his favorite line that he's ever sung, "You're the prayer that mothers whisper each night for their sons everywhere." They lived on a 72-acre (290,000 m^{2}) farm called "ElderBerry Farm on Little Rose Creek", Watkinsville, Georgia. "I'm not in so much of a hurry anymore," Berry told Billboard's Peter Cronin, explaining how undergoing brain surgery had changed his life. "And I try to spend as much time as I can with my family." The Berry family currently resides in Gallatin, Tennessee.

== Awards and nominations ==
=== Grammy Awards ===
Year	Nominee / work	Award	Result
1995	"Your Love Amazes Me"	Best Male Country Vocal Performance	Nominated
1996	"Standing on the Edge of Goodbye"	Best Male Country Vocal Performance	Nominated
1997	Hope: Country Music's Quest for a Cure	Best Country Collaboration with Vocals	Nominated

=== TNN/Music City News Country Awards ===
Year	Nominee / work	Award	Result
1995	John Berry	Male Star of Tomorrow	Nominated
1995	"Your Love Amazes Me"	Single of the Year	Nominated
1996	Standing on the Edge	Album of the Year	Nominated

=== Academy of Country Music Awards ===
Year	Nominee / work	Award	Result
1995	John Berry	Top New Male Vocalist	Nominated
1995	"Your Love Amazes Me"	Song of the Year	Shortlisted
1996	"Standing on the Edge of Goodbye"	Song of the Year	Nominated
1996	John Berry	Top Male Vocalist of the Year	Nominated

=== Country Music Association Awards ===
Year	Nominee / work	Award	Result
1995	John Berry	Horizon Award	Nominated
1995	John Berry	Male Vocalist of the Year	Nominated
1997	"Long Haired Country Boy"	Vocal Event of the Year	Nominated

== Discography ==
Studio albums

- Humble Beginnings (1979)
- In the Nighttime (1981)
- Waiting for You (1982)
- Tired of the Game (1984)
- Things Are Not the Same (1986)
- Saddle the Wind (1988)
- John Berry (1993)
- Standing on the Edge (1995)
- O Holy Night (1995)
- Faces (1996)
- Wildest Dreams (1999)
- Greatest Hits (2000)
- All the Way to There (2001)
- My Heart Is Bethlehem (2002)
- I Give My Heart (2004)
- Songs and Stories (2005)
- Celebrate This Christmas (2006)
- Hits (2006)
- Those Were the Days (2008)
- Christmas Live in Kalamazoo (2010)
- Live Hits in Kalamazoo (2009)
- Real Man. Real Life. Real God. (2012)
- What I Love the Most (2016)
- Christmas (2016)
- Find My Joy (2022)
