= Greatest Hits (Confederate Railroad album) =

Greatest hits album by Confederate Railroad
- Released: June 18, 1996
- Genre: Country
- Label: Atlantic
- Producer: Barry Beckett

Confederate Railroad chronology
When and Where (1995)	Greatest Hits (1996)	Keep on Rockin' (1998)

Professional ratings
Review scores
Source	Rating
Allmusic	link

Greatest Hits is Confederate Railroad's first compilation album. It was released on June 18, 1996 by Atlantic Nashville. It peaked at #60 on the U.S. country albums chart.

== Track listing ==
No.	Title	Writer(s)	Length
1.	"Queen of Memphis"	Dave Gibson, Kathy Louvin	3:20
2.	"Daddy Never Was the Cadillac Kind"	Gibson, Bernie Nelson	3:43
3.	"The One You Love the Most"	Bob DiPiero Reed Nielsen	3:07
4.	"See Ya"	Thom McHugh, Christopher Ward	2:50
5.	"When and Where"	Jess Brown, Brett Jones, Jeff Pennig	2:27
6.	"Elvis and Andy"	Craig Wiseman	3:30
7.	"Jesus and Mama"	Danny Mayo, James Dean Hicks	3:23
8.	"Finish What He Started"	Walt Aldridge, Rick Hall, Billy Spencer	3:22
9.	"When You Leave That Way You Can Never Go Back"	Steve Clark, Johnny MacRae	4:09
10.	"Trashy Women"	Chris Wall	3:14

== Personnel ==
Confederate Railroad

- Mark Dufresne – drums
- Michael Lamb – electric guitar, background vocals
- Chris McDaniel – keyboards, background vocals
- Gates Nichols – steel guitar, background vocals
- Wayne Secrest – bass guitar
- Danny Shirley – acoustic guitar, lead vocals

Additional Musicians

- Eddie Bayers – drums
- Barry Beckett – keyboards
- Bruce Bouton – steel guitar, synthesizer
- Gary Burr – background vocals
- Paul Franklin – steel guitar
- Michael Haynes – horns
- Jim Hoke – horns
- Jim Horn – horns
- Mike Lawler – acoustic guitar, synthesizer
- "Cowboy" Eddie Long – steel guitar
- Terry McMillan – percussion
- Phil Naish – keyboards, synthesizer
- Louis Dean Nunley – background vocals
- Bobby Ogdin – keyboards
- Russ Pahl – dobro
- Don Potter – acoustic guitar
- Suzy Ragsdale – background vocals
- Michael Rhodes – bass guitar
- Tom Roady – percussion
- Charles Rose – horns
- Brent Rowan – acoustic guitar, electric guitar
- Michael Severs – electric guitar
- Harry Stinson – background vocals
- Billy Joe Walker Jr. – acoustic guitar
- Dennis Wilson – background vocals
- Bob Wray – bass guitar
- Curtis Young – background vocals

== Chart performance ==
Chart (1996)	Peak position
U.S. Billboard Top Country Albums	60
