= Notorious (Confederate Railroad album) =

Studio album by Confederate Railroad
- Released: March 22, 1994
- Recorded: 1993
- Studio: Omnisound Studio, The Music Mill, Woodland Digital & Sound Stage
- Genre: Country
- Length: 37:59
- Label: Atlantic
- Producer: Barry Beckett

Confederate Railroad chronology
Confederate Railroad (1992)	Notorious (1994)	When and Where (1995)

Singles from Notorious
- 1. "Daddy Never Was the Cadillac Kind" Released: March 12, 1994; 2. "Elvis and Andy" Released: July 9, 1994; 3. "Summer in Dixie" Released: October 1994

Professional ratings
Review scores
Source	Rating
Allmusic	4.5/5 stars

Notorious is the second studio album by American country music band Confederate Railroad. It was released in 1994 by Atlantic Records Nashville. It peaked at #6 on the US country albums chart, and #13 on the Canadian country albums chart, and was certified platinum by the RIAA. "Summer In Dixie" became their first single to miss the top 40 in the United States.

"I Am Just a Rebel" was previously recorded by Billy Hill on their 1989 album of the same name, and later by Billy Hill member Dennis Robbins on his 1992 album Man with a Plan and was later recorded by Joy Lynn White on her 1994 album Wild Love. "Redneck Romeo" was originally recorded by The Forester Sisters on 1992's I Got a Date.

Like the band's debut album, lead vocalist Danny Shirley was the only band member to record any parts for the album. Shirley only performed lead vocals on the album. Session musicians played all the instruments on the album and performed all background vocals on the album.

== Track listing ==
No.	Title	Writer(s)	Length
1.	"Daddy Never Was the Cadillac Kind"	Dave Gibson; Bernie Nelson	3:43
2.	"Summer in Dixie"	Gene Levine; John Robbin	3:01
3.	"I Am Just a Rebel"	Bob DiPiero; John Scott Sherrill; Dennis Robbins	3:49
4.	"Elvis and Andy"	Craig Wiseman	3:30
5.	"Notorious"	Pat Terry	4:09
6.	"Redneck Romeo"	Gibson; Wiseman	3:36
7.	"Hunger Pains"	Rory Bourke; Bucky Jones; Ronny Scaife	3:22
8.	"Roll the Dice"	Larry Boone; Paul Nelson	4:27
9.	"Move Over Madonna"	Wiseman; Troy Seals	3:28
10.	"Three Verses"	J. Fred Knobloch	4:47
Total length:			37:59

== Personnel ==
As listed in liner notes

Confederate Railroad

- Mark Dufresne – drums*
- Michael Lamb – electric guitar,* background vocals*
- Chris McDaniel – keyboards,* background vocals*
- Gates Nichols – steel guitar,* background vocals*
- Wayne Secrest – bass guitar*
- Danny Shirley – lead vocals

* Credited, but does not appear on album. (Note: Lead vocalist Danny Shirley was the only band member who recorded parts for the album. Shirley only performed lead vocals on the album. Session musicians played all the instruments on the album and performed all background vocals on the album.)

Additional musicians

- Eddie Bayers – drums
- Barry Beckett – keyboards
- Bruce Bouton – steel guitar, synthesizer
- Gary Burr – background vocals
- Paul Franklin – steel guitar
- "Cowboy" Eddie Long – steel guitar
- Phil Naish – keyboards
- Russ Pahl – dobro
- Suzi Ragsdale – background vocals
- Tom Roady – percussion
- Michael Rhodes – bass guitar
- Brent Rowan – electric guitar
- Harry Stinson – background vocals
- Billy Joe Walker, Jr. – acoustic guitar
- Hurshel Wiginton – background vocals
- Dennis Wilson – background vocals
- Curtis Young – background vocals

== Charts ==
=== Weekly charts ===
Chart (1994)	Peak position
Canadian Country Albums (RPM)	13
US Billboard 200	52
US Top Country Albums (Billboard)	6

=== Year-end charts ===
Chart (1994)	Position
US Top Country Albums (Billboard)	47

=== Singles ===
Year	Single	Chart Positions	
Year	Single	US Country	CAN Country
1994	"Daddy Never Was the Cadillac Kind"	9	7
1994	"Elvis and Andy"	20	8
1994	"Summer in Dixie"	55	—
