= The Coast Is Clear (Tracy Lawrence album) =

Studio album by Tracy Lawrence
- Released: March 18, 1997
- Genre: Country
- Length: 33:01
- Label: Atlantic
- Producers: Flip Anderson, Tracy Lawrence, Don Cook

Tracy Lawrence chronology
Time Marches On (1996)	The Coast Is Clear (1997)	The Best of Tracy Lawrence (1998)

Singles from The Coast Is Clear
- 1. "Better Man, Better Off" Released: February 22, 1997; 2. "How a Cowgirl Says Goodbye" Released: May 26, 1997; 3. "The Coast Is Clear" Released: September 1997; 4. "While You Sleep" Released: March 1998

Professional ratings
Review scores
Source	Rating
AllMusic	4/5 stars

The Coast Is Clear is the fifth studio album by American country music artist Tracy Lawrence. It produced five singles: "How a Cowgirl Says Goodbye", "Better Man, Better Off", "The Coast Is Clear", and "While You Sleep". Though the first two singles charted at #2 and #4 on the country chart, respectively, the title track was the first single of Lawrence's career to fall short of the Top Ten. "While You Sleep" missed the Top 40 entirely. Lawrence did not release another studio album until Lessons Learned, in 2000.

== Critical reception ==
Entertainment Weekly wrote that Lawrence "mixes a fine program of driving, contemporary country with the traditional sound of his Arkansas youth."

== Track listing ==
No.	Title	Writer(s)	Length
1.	"Better Man, Better Off"	Stan Paul Davis, Brett Jones	3:35
2.	"The Coast Is Clear"	Jess Brown, Jones	3:56
3.	"Any Minute Now"	J. B. Rudd, Thom McHugh	2:58
4.	"While You Sleep"	Larry Boone, Tracy Lawrence, Paul Nelson	3:04
5.	"How a Cowgirl Says Goodbye"	Boone, Lawrence, Nelson	3:32
6.	"One Step Ahead of the Storm"	Boone, Lawrence, Nelson	3:00
7.	"In a Moment of Weakness"	Boone, Nelson	3:24
8.	"Livin' in Black and White"	Lawrence, Gary Baker, Frank J. Myers	3:07
9.	"I Hit the Ground Crawlin'"	Boone, Lawrence, Nelson	2:56
10.	"As Lonesome as It Gets"	Larry Cordle, J. P. Pennington	3:29

== Personnel ==
As listed in liner notes.

Tracks 1 - 4, 7 & 10

- Flip Anderson - piano, keyboards
- Tom Baughman - steel guitar
- Mark Casstevens - acoustic guitar, hi-strung guitar
- Billy Cochran - fiddle
- Butch Davis - electric guitar, slide guitar
- Deryl Dodd - background vocals
- Paul Franklin - steel guitar
- Rob Hajacos - fiddle
- Tony Harrell - piano, keyboards
- Tracy Lawrence - lead vocals
- Liana Manis - background vocals
- Terry McMillan - percussion
- Eric Nelson - drums
- Darryl O'Donnell - acoustic guitar
- Dave Pomeroy - bass guitar
- Brent Rowan - electric guitar, mandolin
- Milton Sledge - drums
- Leon Watson - bass guitar
- Kristin Wilkinson - string arrangement on "While You Sleep"

Tracks 5, 6, 8 & 9

- Bruce C. Bouton - steel guitar
- Dennis Burnside - piano, keyboards, Hammond B-3 organ
- Mark Casstevens - acoustic guitar
- Rob Hajacos - fiddle, "assorted hoedown tools"
- Tracy Lawrence - lead vocals
- Brent Mason - electric guitar, tic tac bass, gut string guitar
- John Wesley Ryles - background vocals
- Dennis Wilson - background vocals
- Lonnie Wilson - drums, percussion, acoustic guitar
- Glenn Worf - bass guitar

== Chart performance ==
Chart (1997)	Peak position
U.S. Billboard Top Country Albums	4
U.S. Billboard 200	45
Canadian RPM Country Albums	6
