= Lucky to Be Alive (Confederate Railroad album) =

Studio album by Confederate Railroad
- Released: July 15, 2016
- Genre: Country
- Length: 41:03
- Label: D&B Masterworks
- Producer: Blue Miller & Danny Shirley

Confederate Railroad chronology
Cheap Thrills (2007)	Lucky to Be Alive (2016)

Lucky to Be Alive is the seventh studio album by the American country music band Confederate Railroad. The project marks the first album release in nine years for the Grammy-nominated group, and was released on July 15, 2016. The ACM award-winning band are also bringing the star power on the album, with guest appearances from Willie Nelson, John Anderson, Colt Ford and former NFL coach, Jerry Glanville, on a special 20th Anniversary version of the signature smash, “Trashy Women.”

== Track listing ==
1. "Lucky to Be Alive" (Danny Shirley, Blue Miller, Sonny LeMaire) – 3:14
2. "Played the Game" (Roger Alan Wade) – 3:29
3. "If I Ever Cross That Line" (Shirley, Miller, LeMaire) – 3:46
4. "The Man I Am Today" (Shirley, Miller) – 3:20
5. "Trashy Women (20th Anniversary)" featuring Willie Nelson, John Anderson and Colt Ford (Chris Wall, Colt Ford) – 3:40
6. "Somebody Like You" (Shirley, Miller, LeMaire) – 3:21
7. "Goodbye Song" (Shirley, Miller, LeMaire) – 3:10
8. "Whiskey And Women" (Shirley, Tony Stampley, Larry Alderman) – 3:34
9. "Fast Cars, Guitars, and Fine Tuned Women" (Tony Stampley, Buck Moore, John Northrup, Ken Randolph) – 3:17
10. "I’m Not Fallin’ For That" (Bobby Randall, Rusty Hendrix) – 3:38
11. "Psycho Bitch From Hell (Live)" (Wade) – 3:18
12. "Don’t Feel as Young as I Used To" (Shirley, Miller, Tim Austin) – 3:16

== Personnel ==
Confederate Railroad

- Rusty Hendrix - electric guitar
- Mark Dufresne - drums
- Bobby Randall - steel guitar, fiddle, vocals
- Mo Thaxton - guitar, vocals
- Wayne Secrest - bass guitar
- Danny Shirley - acoustic guitar, lead vocals

== Chart performance ==
Chart (2016)	Peak position
U.S. Billboard Top Country Albums	49
