= When and Where =

Studio album by Confederate Railroad
- Released: June 13, 1995
- Recorded: 1994–5 at Masterfonics, Recording Arts and Sound Stage, Nashville
- Genre: Country
- Length: 34:42
- Label: Atlantic
- Producer: Barry Beckett

Confederate Railroad chronology
Notorious (1994)	When and Where (1995)	Greatest Hits (1996)

Singles from When and Where
- 1. "When and Where" Released: May 13, 1995

Professional ratings
Review scores
Source	Rating
Allmusic	4.5/5 stars

When and Where is the third studio album by the American country music band Confederate Railroad. It was issued by Atlantic Records in 1995. The album includes the singles "When and Where", "Bill's Laundromat, Bar and Grill", "When He Was My Age" and "See Ya." Although "When and Where" was a number 24 hit on Billboard Hot Country Singles & Tracks (now Hot Country Songs) in mid-1995, the other three singles all missed the Top 40.

== Content ==
"My Baby's Lovin'" was later released as a single by Daryle Singletary on his 1998 album Ain't It the Truth, and "Oh No" was also recorded by 4 Runner on their self-titled debut album. "Toss a Little Bone" was later included on Confederate Railroad's 2000 compilation album Rockin' Country Party Pack, and it charted at number 71 that year.

Like the band's first two albums, lead vocalist Danny Shirley was the only band member to record any parts for the album. Shirley only performed lead vocals on the album. Session musicians played all the instruments on the album and performed all background vocals on the album.

== Track listing ==
No.	Title	Writer(s)	Length
1.	"When and Where"	Jess Brown; Brett Jones; Jeff Pennig	2:23
2.	"Right Track Wrong Train"	Michael White; Frank J. Myers	3:21
3.	"Toss a Little Bone"	Steve Bogard; Rick Giles	3:45
4.	"When He Was My Age"	Kenny Chesney; David Lowe; Billy Lawson	3:15
5.	"Bill's Laundromat, Bar and Grill"	Mark Germino; Jimmy Alan Stewart	3:36
6.	"All I Wanted"	Pat Terry	4:18
7.	"See Ya"	Thom McHugh; Chris Ward	2:50
8.	"Sounds of Home"	James Dean Hicks; Mark Alan Springer; Jerry Laseter	3:18
9.	"Oh No"	Al Anderson; Mike Lawler	3:43
10.	"My Baby's Lovin'"	Delbert McClinton; Michael Lunn	3:41
Total length:			34:42

== Personnel ==
Compiled from liner notes.

=== Confederate Railroad ===
- Jimmy Dormire – electric guitar*
- Mark Dufresne – drums*
- Chris McDaniels – keyboards*
- Gates Nichols – steel guitar*
- Wayne Secrest – bass guitar*
- Danny Shirley – lead vocals, acoustic guitar*

* Credited, but does not appear on album. (Note: Lead vocalist Danny Shirley was the only band member who recorded parts for the album. Shirley only performed lead vocals on the album. Session musicians played all the instruments on the album and performed all background vocals on the album.)

=== Additional musicians ===
- Eddie Bayers – drums
- Barry Beckett – keyboards
- Mike Lawler – acoustic guitar, synthesizer
- "Cowboy" Eddie Long – steel guitar
- Terry McMillan – percussion
- Phil Naish – synthesizer
- Louis Nunley – background vocals
- Bobby Ogdin – keyboards
- Michael Rhodes – bass guitar
- Brent Rowan – electric guitar
- Mike Severs – electric guitar
- Harry Stinson – background vocals
- Billy Joe Walker, Jr. – acoustic guitar
- Hurshel Wiginton – background vocals
- Dennis Wilson – background vocals
- Curtis "Mr. Harmony" Young – background vocals
- Horns by Jim Horn, Charles Rose, Jim Hoke, Michael Haynes

== Chart performance ==
Chart (1995)	Peak position
U.S. Billboard Top Country Albums	21
U.S. Billboard 200	152
