= Lessons learned (disambiguation) =

Lessons learned are experiences distilled from a project that should be actively taken into account in future projects.

Lessons learned may also refer to:

== Music ==
- Lessons Learned (album), an album by Tracy Lawrence

=== Songs ===
- "Lessons Learned", by Tracy Lawrence from that album
- "Lessons Learned", from Grand (Matt & Kim album)
- "Lessons Learned", by Carrie Underwood:
  - On her album Some Hearts
  - On Kristin Chenoweth album Some Lessons Learned

== Project management ==
- Military practice:
  - The "military lessons of the American Civil War" in Memoirs of General William T. Sherman By Himself (1875)
  - U.S. Army Center for Army Lessons Learned (since 1985)
  - NATO Joint Analysis and Lessons Learned Centre (since 2002)
- Lessons Learned or lessons learned, postmortem documentation

== See also ==
- Lessons Learned (film)
- "Lesson Learned", a song by Alice in Chains
- Lessons to Be Learned, album by Gabriella Cilmi
- "Lesson Learned", a song by Alicia Keys and John Mayer from As I Am
