= Gibson/Miller Band =

American country music band

- Origin: Columbus, Mississippi, United States
- Genres: Country
- Years active: 1990–1994
- Labels: Epic
- Past members: Mike Daly; Dave Gibson; Bryan Grassmeyer; Steve Grossman; Blue Miller; Doug Kahan

Gibson/Miller Band was an American country music band founded in 1990 by Dave Gibson and Bill "Blue" Miller, the latter of whom was a former guest musician in rock musician Bob Seger's Silver Bullet Band. Both Gibson and Miller served as vocalists and guitarists in the Gibson/Miller Band, which also included Mike Daly (steel guitar), Bryan Grassmeyer (bass guitar), and Steve Grossman (drums). Grassmeyer was replaced in 1993 by Doug Kahan. Between 1992 and 1994, the Gibson/Miller Band recorded two albums for Epic Records, in addition to charting seven singles on the Billboard Hot Country Singles & Tracks charts. After disbanding in 1994, both Gibson and Miller assumed solo careers.

== Biography ==
Gibson/Miller Band was formed in 1990, when Doug Johnson, then-vice president of Epic Records, introduced Dave Gibson and Blue Miller to each other, thinking that the two artists would work well together as songwriters. Among Gibson's cuts were "If It Don't Come Easy" by Tanya Tucker, "Ships That Don't Come In" by Joe Diffie and "Queen of Memphis" by Confederate Railroad. Gibson and Miller soon assembled a band and recorded a demo tape, which they sent to Johnson. By 1992, the band was signed to Epic Records; their debut single, "Big Heart", was released at the end of the year.

In 1993, the group's first album, titled Where There's Smoke, was released. Counting "Big Heart", the album produced five chart singles overall, including the No. 20 "High Rollin'", their highest-charting. The group also received the Academy of Country Music's award for Top New Vocal Duo or Group, beating Blackhawk and Boy Howdy.

A second album, Red, White & Blue Collar, was released in 1994. Serving as its lead-off single was a cover of Waylon Jennings and Willie Nelson's "Mammas Don't Let Your Babies Grow Up to Be Cowboys"; the Gibson/Miller Band's version was also featured in the soundtrack for the 1994 film The Cowboy Way. Red, White & Blue Collar was less successful than its predecessor, however, and the group was dropped from Epic's roster that same year, shortly before disbanding. Both Gibson and Miller continued to record solo, and as backing musicians for other artists. In 1997, Gibson married singer-songwriter Daisy Dern. Miller died of unknown causes on August 11, 2018, at age 66.

== Discography ==
=== Albums ===
Title	Album details	Peak chart positions	
Title	Album details	US Country	US Heat
Where There's Smoke...	Release date: January 12, 1993; Label: Epic Records	65	30
Red, White and Blue Collar	Release date: July 19, 1994; Label: Epic Records	—	—
"—" denotes releases that did not chart

=== Singles ===
Year	Single	Peak chart positions		Album
Year	Single	US Country	CAN Country	Album
1992	"Big Heart"	37	58	Where There's Smoke...
1993	"High Rollin'"	20	18	Where There's Smoke...
1993	"Texas Tattoo"	22	33	Where There's Smoke...
1993	"Small Price"	46	55	Where There's Smoke...
1994	"Stone Cold Country"	40	35	Where There's Smoke...
1994	"Mammas Don't Let Your Babies Grow Up to Be Cowboys"	49	71	Red, White and Blue Collar
1994	"Red, White and Blue Collar"	59	—	Red, White and Blue Collar
"—" denotes releases that did not chart

=== Music videos ===
Year	Video	Director
1992	"Big Heart"	Martin Kahan
1993	"Texas Tattoo"	Jon Small
1993	"Stone Cold Country"	Martin Kahan
1994	"Mammas Don't Let Your Babies Grow Up to Be Cowboys"	Sherman Halsey
1994	"Red, White and Blue Collar"	

== Awards and nominations ==
Year	Organization	Award	Nominee/Work	Result
1994	Academy of Country Music Awards	Top New Vocal Group or Duet	Gibson/Miller Band	Won
