= Red, White and Blue Collar =

Studio album by Gibson/Miller Band
- Released: July 19, 1994
- Studio: The Money Pit, The Reflections, Recording Arts
- Genre: Country
- Label: Epic
- Producer: Doug Johnson; Blue Miller

Gibson/Miller Band chronology
Where There's Smoke (1993)	Red, White and Blue Collar (1994)

Red, White & Blue Collar is the second and final album by American country music band Gibson/Miller Band. It was released in 1994 via Epic Records. The album includes a cover of Waylon Jennings' "Mammas Don't Let Your Babies Grow Up to Be Cowboys", which also served as its first single. This version of the song was also featured on the soundtrack to the film The Cowboy Way. The title track was the album's only other single.

Mark Wills later recorded "Sudden Stop" on his 1996 self-titled debut.

CD Review reviewed the album favorably, stating that "The clever lyrics and unpretentious musicianship on Red, White, & Blue Collar are so reminiscent of a juke joint on a Saturday night that you can almost smell the sawdust on the floor."

== Track listing ==
1. "Red, White and Blue Collar" (Dave Gibson, Blue Miller) – 3:16
2. "Mammas Don't Let Your Babies Grow Up to Be Cowboys" (Ed Bruce, Patsy Bruce) – 3:27
3. "The Fugitive" (Pat Bunch, Doug Johnson) – 3:04
4. "All Because of You" (Steven Dale Jones, Billy Henderson) – 3:29
5. "Haunted Honky Tonk" (Gibson, Miller) – 5:09
6. "Right Off the Top of My Heart" (Gibson, Miller) – 3:13
7. "Johnny Get Your Gun" (Gibson, Miller) – 3:58
8. "Sudden Stop" (Bunch, Johnson) – 2:30
9. "Heavy Metal Rocker" (Gibson, Carol Chase, Kathy Louvin) – 3:27
10. "What Are You Waiting For" (Miller, Beth Miekos) – 4:26

== Personnel ==
Adapted from Red, White and Blue Collar liner notes.

Gibson/Miller Band

- Mike Daly – steel guitar, slide guitar
- Dave Gibson – lead vocals, guitar
- Steve Grossman – drums, percussion
- Doug Kahan – bass guitar, background vocals
- Blue Miller – guitar, lead vocals

Additional musicians

- Terry McMillan – harmonica
- Steve Nathan – keyboards
- Biff Watson – acoustic guitar
- John Willis – rhythm guitar

Technical

- Tommy Cooper – overdubbing
- Mitch Eaton – engineer
- Doug Johnson – producer
- Anthony Martin – engineer
- Blue Miller – producer
- Wayne Morgan – engineer
- Denny Purcell – mastering
- Ed Seay – recording, mixing
