= Unleashed (Confederate Railroad album) =

Studio album by Confederate Railroad
- Released: August 28, 2001
- Genre: Country
- Label: Audium Entertainment
- Producer: Barry Beckett; Danny Shirley

Confederate Railroad chronology
Keep On Rockin' (1998)	Unleashed (2001)	Cheap Thrills (2007)

Unleashed is the fifth studio album by the American country music band Confederate Railroad. It was issued by Audium Entertainment (now E1 Music) in 2001. The album includes the singles "That's What Brothers Do" and "She Treats Her Body Like a Temple." The former peaked at #39 on the Hot Country Songs charts, and the latter reached #59 on the same.

Stewart Mason of Allmusic rated the album four stars out of five, saying that it showed the band's outlaw country influences and that the inclusion of ballads made the band "not just a bunch of retro-macho poseurs."

== Track listing ==
No.	Title	Writer(s)	Length
1.	"Still One Outlaw Left"	Jess Brown, Tony Lane, Anthony Smith	3:06
2.	"That's What Brothers Do"	Chris Wallin, Smith	4:01
3.	"She Treats Her Body Like a Temple" (with George Jones)	Rivers Rutherford, Craig Wiseman	3:51
4.	"I'm Diggin' It"	Bob DiPiero, Wiseman	3:24
5.	"White Trash with Money"	Buck Moore, Danny Shirley	2:59
6.	"Wasted Time"	Shirley, Wiseman	3:30
7.	"The 'R' Word"	Dennis Linde	3:22
8.	"Borrowed Time"	Steven Bliss, James Otto	3:16
9.	"Between the Rainbows and the Rain"	Jess Brown, Brett Jones, Tony Lane	4:04
10.	"Thick as Thieves"	Ric Kipp	4:09

== Personnel ==
Confederate Railroad

- Jimmy Dormire - electric guitar
- Mark Dufresne - drums
- Cody McCarver - keyboards, background vocals
- Gates Nichols - steel guitar, background vocals
- Wayne Secrest - bass guitar
- Danny Shirley - acoustic guitar, lead vocals

Additional Musicians

- James Allan - background vocals
- Mark Beckett - drums, percussion
- J.T. Corenflos - electric guitar, baritone guitar
- Bob DiPiero - background vocals
- Aubrey Haynie - fiddle, mandolin
- John Hobbs - organ, piano, synthesizer
- Blue Miller - acoustic guitar
- Russ Pahl - banjo, dobro, steel guitar, slide guitar
- Michael Rhodes - bass guitar
- Harry Stinson - background vocals
- Bobby Terry - background vocals
- Craig Wiseman - background vocals
- Curtis Young - background vocals

== Chart performance ==
Chart (2001)	Peak position
U.S. Billboard Top Country Albums	63
