= Confederate Railroad (album) =

Studio album by Confederate Railroad
- Released: April 28, 1992
- Recorded: October 1991–March 1992
- Studio: The Castle, Franklin, TN Midtown Studios, and Omnisound Studios Nashville, TN
- Genre: Neotraditional country; Southern rock
- Length: 33:29
- Label: Atlantic
- Producer: Barry Beckett

Confederate Railroad chronology
Confederate Railroad (1992)	Notorious (1994)

Singles from Confederate Railroad
- 1. "She Took It Like a Man" Released: April 4, 1992; 2. "Jesus and Mama" Released: July 4, 1992; 3. "Queen of Memphis" Released: December 1992; 4. "When You Leave That Way You Can Never Go Back" Released: April 10, 1993; 5. "Trashy Women" Released: July 24, 1993; 6. "She Never Cried" Released: December 11, 1993

Professional ratings
Review scores
Source	Rating
Allmusic	3/5 stars

Confederate Railroad is the debut studio album by American country music band Confederate Railroad, released on April 28, 1992 via Atlantic Records. It peaked at #7 on the US country albums chart, and #19 on the Canadian country chart. It was certified 2×Multi-Platinum by the RIAA.

Singles released from the album include "She Took It Like a Man", "Jesus and Mama", "Queen of Memphis", "When You Leave That Way You Can Never Go Back", "Trashy Women" and "She Never Cried". "When You Leave That Way You Can Never Go Back" was previously a single in 1985 for Bill Anderson from his album Yesterday, Today, and Tomorrow.

Lead vocalist Danny Shirley was the only band member to record any parts for the album. Shirley only performed lead vocals on the album. Session musicians played all the instruments on the album and performed all background vocals on the album.

== Track listing ==
No.	Title	Writer(s)	Length
1.	"She Took It Like a Man"	Danny Mayo; Paul Nelson; Karen Staley	2:47
2.	"Long Gone"	Pat Terry	3:48
3.	"Jesus and Mama"	Mayo; James Dean Hicks	3:23
4.	"Time Off for Bad Behavior"	Bobby Keel; Larry Latimaer	2:49
5.	"She Never Cried"	Mayo; Diana Rae; Freddy Weller	3:26
6.	"Black Label, White Lies"	Craig Wiseman	3:27
7.	"When You Leave That Way You Can Never Go Back"	Steve Clark; Johnny MacRae	4:12
8.	"Queen of Memphis"	Dave Gibson; Kathy Louvin	3:20
9.	"You Don't Know What It's Like"	Don Cook; Chris Waters	2:57
10.	"Trashy Women"	Chris Wall	3:14
Total length:			33:29

== Personnel ==
Confederate Railroad

- Mark Dufresne – drums*
- Michael Lamb – electric guitar,* background vocals*
- Chris McDaniel – keyboards,* background vocals*
- Gates Nichols – steel guitar,* background vocals*
- Wayne Secrest – bass guitar*
- Danny Shirley – acoustic guitar,* lead vocals

* Credited, but does not appear on album. (Note: Lead vocalist Danny Shirley was the only band member who recorded parts for the album. Shirley only performed lead vocals on the album. Session musicians played all the instruments on the album and performed all background vocals on the album.)

Additional musicians

- Eddie Bayers – drums
- Barry Beckett – keyboards
- Michele Lamb – background vocals
- "Cowboy" Eddie Long – steel guitar
- Don Potter – acoustic guitar
- Suzi Ragsdale – background vocals
- Michael Rhodes – bass guitar
- Brent Rowan – electric guitar
- Harry Stinson – background vocals
- Billy Joe Walker Jr. – acoustic guitar
- Dennis Wilson – background vocals
- Bob Wray – bass guitar
- Curtis Young – background vocals

== Charts ==
=== Weekly charts ===
Chart (1992–1993)	Peak position
Canadian Country Albums (RPM)	19
US Billboard 200	53
US Top Country Albums (Billboard)	7
US Heatseekers Albums (Billboard)	3

=== Year-end charts ===
Chart (1993)	Position
US Top Country Albums (Billboard)	25
Chart (1994)	Position
US Top Country Albums (Billboard)	25

=== Singles ===
Year	Single	Chart Positions		
Year	Single	US Country	US	CAN Country
1992	"She Took It Like a Man"	37	—	41
1992	"Jesus and Mama"	4	—	14
1993	"Queen of Memphis"	2	—	3
1993	"When You Leave That Way You Can Never Go Back"	14	—	18
1993	"Trashy Women"	10	113	12
1994	"She Never Cried"	27	—	28
