= Unforgiven (Tracy Lawrence song) =

Single by Tracy Lawrence

from the album Lessons Learned
- B-side: "Time Marches On"
- Released: March 24, 2001
- Genre: Country
- Length: 3:47
- Label: Atlantic
- Songwriter(s): Larry Boone, Bobby Pinson, Paul Nelson
- Producer(s): Flip Anderson, Tracy Lawrence, Butch Carr

Tracy Lawrence singles chronology
"Lonely" (2000)	"Unforgiven" (2001)	"Life Don't Have to Be So Hard" (2001)

"Unforgiven" is a song recorded by American country music artist Tracy Lawrence. It was released in March 2001 as the third single from the album Lessons Learned. The song reached #35 on the Billboard Hot Country Singles & Tracks chart. The song was written by Larry Boone, Bobby Pinson and Paul Nelson.

== Chart performance ==
Chart (2001)	Peak position
US Hot Country Songs (Billboard)	35
