= Lessons Learned (song) =

Single by Tracy Lawrence

from the album Lessons Learned
- Released: November 1, 1999
- Recorded: 1999
- Genre: Country
- Length: 2:57
- Label: Atlantic
- Songwriters: Paul Nelson; Larry Boone; Tracy Lawrence
- Producers: Flip Anderson; Tracy Lawrence; Butch Carr

Tracy Lawrence singles chronology
"While You Sleep" (1998)	"Lessons Learned" (1999)	"Lonely" (2000)

"Lessons Learned" is a song co-written and recorded by American country music artist Tracy Lawrence. It was released in November 1999 as the first single and title track from his album of the same name. It peaked at number 3 on the Billboard Hot Country Singles & Tracks (now Hot Country Songs) chart and at number 3 on the Canadian RPM Country Tracks. Lawrence wrote the song with Larry Boone and Paul Nelson.

== Content ==
Lawrence wrote the song with Larry Boone and Paul Nelson, frequent collaborators of his. The three had also written "Stars over Texas" and "How a Cowgirl Says Goodbye". According to Boone, Lawrence came up with the song's concept but did not have a melody in mind, and the three of them then decided to give the song a sound that would suit Lawrence's style.

The song has a central theme of learning from life experiences. It is composed in the key of F major. The main chord pattern of the verses is B♭-F-Gm-F/A-B♭-F-Gm7-C twice, while the chorus follows the pattern B♭-F-E♭-B♭-Gm7-C-F.

== Chart performance ==
The song debuted at number 70 on the Billboard Hot Country Singles & Tracks chart dated November 6, 1999, and charted for 29 weeks on that chart. It reached a peak of number 3 on the chart dated April 1, 2000. It was also Lawrence's only Top 40 hit on the Billboard Hot 100.

Chart (1999–2000)	Peak position
Canada Country Singles (RPM)	3
US Billboard Hot 100	40
US Hot Country Songs (Billboard)	3

=== Year-end charts ===
Chart (2000)	Position
US Country Songs (Billboard)	17
