= Time Marches On =

Studio album by Tracy Lawrence
- Released: January 23, 1996
- Recorded: 1995
- Studio: Criteria Recording Studios, Miami Florida Emerald Sound Studios, The Music Mill, Sound Shop Studios, and Tree International Studios Nashville, TN
- Genre: Country
- Length: 33:00
- Label: Atlantic
- Producer: Don Cook (tracks 2, 3, 4, 8, 10); Tracy Lawrence and Flip Anderson (tracks 1, 5, 6, 7, 9)

Tracy Lawrence chronology
Tracy Lawrence Live and Unplugged (1995)	Time Marches On (1996)	The Coast Is Clear (1997)

Singles from Time Marches On
- 1. "If You Loved Me" Released: December 4, 1995; 2. "Time Marches On" Released: March 18, 1996; 3. "Stars over Texas" Released: July 15, 1996; 4. "Is That a Tear" Released: November 26, 1996

Professional ratings
Review scores
Source	Rating
AllMusic	3/5 stars

Time Marches On is the fourth studio album by American country music artist Tracy Lawrence. It was released on January 23, 1996, by Atlantic Records. The title track spent three weeks at Number One on the Billboard country charts in 1996, becoming Lawrence's biggest chart hit to date. "Is That a Tear", "If You Loved Me", and "Stars over Texas" were also released from this album, and all were Top 5 hits as well.

== Track listing ==
No.	Title	Writer(s)	Length
1.	"Is That a Tear"	John Jarrard, Kenny Beard	3:18
2.	"If You Loved Me"	Paul Nelson, Tom Shapiro	3:21
3.	"Time Marches On"	Bobby Braddock	3:03
4.	"Speed of a Fool"	Larry Boone, Paul Nelson	3:22
5.	"I Know That Hurt by Heart"	J. B. Rudd, Thom McHugh	3:24
6.	"Somewhere Between the Moon and You"	Tracy Lawrence, Boone, Nelson	3:24
7.	"Different Man"	Flip Anderson, Boone, Nelson	3:24
8.	"Excitable Boy"	Don Cook, Boone, Nelson	2:56
9.	"Stars over Texas"	Boone, Lawrence, Nelson	3:33
10.	"From What We Give"	Boone, Lawrence, Nelson	3:15

== Personnel ==
As listed in liner notes.

- Flip Anderson – piano, keyboards
- Tom Baughman – steel guitar
- Bruce Bouton – steel guitar, slide guitar
- Mike Brown – acoustic guitar
- Dennis Burnside – piano, Hammond organ
- Larry Byrom – acoustic guitar
- Mark Casstevens – acoustic guitar
- Billy Cochran – fiddle
- Butch Davis – electric guitar, slide guitar
- Deryl Dodd – background vocals
- Paul Franklin – steel guitar
- Rob Hajacos – fiddle, "assorted hoedown tools"
- Tracy Lawrence – acoustic guitar, lead vocals
- Liana Manis – background vocals
- Brent Mason – electric guitar, acoustic guitar
- Vic Mastrianni – drums
- Terry McMillan – percussion
- Dave Pomeroy – bass guitar
- Brent Rowan – electric guitar, mandolin
- John Wesley Ryles – background vocals
- Hank Singer – fiddle
- Milton Sledge – drums
- Joe Spivey – fiddle
- Leon Watson – bass guitar
- Dennis Wilson – background vocals
- Lonnie Wilson – drums, percussion
- Glenn Worf – bass guitar

== Charts ==
=== Weekly charts ===
Chart (1996)	Peak position
Canadian Country Albums (RPM)	4
US Billboard 200	25
US Top Country Albums (Billboard)	4

=== Year-end charts ===
Chart (1996)	Position
US Billboard 200	79
US Top Country Albums (Billboard)	13
Chart (1997)	Position
US Top Country Albums (Billboard)	47
