= Keep On Rockin' (Confederate Railroad album) =

Keep on Rockin'

Studio album by Confederate Railroad
- Released: October 20, 1998
- Genre: Country
- Length: 35:46
- Label: Atlantic
- Producer: Barry Beckett, Pete Greene

Confederate Railroad chronology
Greatest Hits (1996)	Keep on Rockin' (1998)	Unleashed (2001)

Keep on Rockin' is the fourth studio album by the American country music band Confederate Railroad. It was issued by Atlantic Records in 1998. The album includes the singles "The Big One" and "Cowboy Cadillac," which respectively reached numbers 66 and 70 on the Hot Country Singles & Tracks charts. "Simple Man", a cover of Lynyrd Skynyrd, previously appeared on the 1994 compilation album Skynyrd Frynds.

== Track listing ==
1. "Keep On Rockin'" (Al Anderson, Craig Wiseman) – 3:20
2. "I Hate Rap" (Dewayne Blackwell) – 3:09
3. "Sunday Morning and Saturday Night" (Danny Shirley, Wiseman) – 2:53
4. "I Don't Want to Hang Out with Me" (Chris Knight, Wiseman) – 3:35
5. "A Bible and a Bus Ticket Home" (James Dean Hicks, Wiseman) – 3:45
6. "Good Ol' Boy (Gettin' Tough)" (Richard Bennett, Steve Earle) – 4:06
7. "Cowboy Cadillac" (Danny Wells, Wiseman) – 3:17
8. "The Big One" (Jon Ims, Pam Matthews) – 2:34
9. "Momma Ain't Home Tonight" (Ed Hunnicutt, Buck Moore, Roger Alan Wade, Shirley) – 3:16
10. "Simple Man" (Ronnie Van Zant, Gary Rossington) – 5:50

== Personnel ==
- Eddie Bayers - percussion (tracks 1 to 5, 7 to 9), drums (tracks 6 and 10)
- Barry Beckett - keyboards (tracks 1 to 10)
- Mike Brignardello - bass (tracks 1 to 5, 7 to 9)
- Charlie Daniels - fiddle (track 6)
- Steve Earle - vocals (track 6), rhythm guitar (track 6)
- Paul Franklin - steel guitar (track 10)
- "Cowboy" Eddie Long - steel guitar (tracks 1 to 9)
- Blue Miller - acoustic guitar (tracks 1 to 5, 7 to 9)
- Louis Nunley - vocals (tracks 1 to 5, 7 to 9)
- Bobby Ogdin - keyboards (tracks 1 to 5, 7 to 9)
- Michael Rhodes - bass (tracks 6 and 10)
- Brent Rowan - guitar (tracks 1 to 9), electric guitar (track 10)
- Danny Shirley - vocals (track 6), lead vocals (tracks 1 to 5, 7 to 10)
- Harry Stinson - vocals (tracks 1 to 5, 7 to 10)
- Billy Joe Walker, Jr. - acoustic guitar (tracks 6 and 10)
- Dennis Wilson - vocals (tracks 1 to 5, 7 to 9)
- Curtis Young - vocals (tracks 1 to 5, 7 to 9)

== Chart performance ==
Chart (1998)	Peak position
U.S. Billboard Top Country Albums	57
