= Where There's Smoke... (Gibson/Miller Band album) =

Studio album by Gibson/Miller Band
- Released: January 12, 1993
- Recorded: The Money Pit, The Reflections, Sound Emporium, The Music Mill, Champagne Studio
- Genre: Country
- Label: Epic
- Producer: Doug Johnson; Blue Miller

Gibson/Miller Band chronology
Where There's Smoke... (1993)	Red, White & Blue Collar (1994)

Where There's Smoke... is the debut studio album by American country music group Gibson/Miller Band. It was released in 1993 via Epic Records. The album includes five singles: "Big Heart", "High Rollin'", "Texas Tattoo", "Small Price", and "Stone Cold Country". Except for "Small Price", these all charted within Top 40 on Hot Country Songs between 1992 and 1994.

The track "Where There's Smoke" was later recorded by Archer/Park on their 1994 album We Got a Lot in Common, and was a No. 29 single for them in 1994.

== Critical reception ==
A review from People was positive, stating that "Fueled by tongue-in-cheek lyrics...and Dave Gibson’s weathered tenor, their debut album conjures up freewheeling, fast-drinking honkytonk nights."

== Track listing ==
No.	Title	Writer(s)	Length
1.	"High Rollin'"	Dave Gibson, Blue Miller	3:31
2.	"Where There's Smoke"	Bobby Barker, Mark Collie	2:47
3.	"Your Daddy Hates Me"	Pat Bunch, Doug Johnson	3:21
4.	"Small Price"	Austin Cunningham, Thom McHugh	3:26
5.	"Texas Tattoo"	Gibson, Miller	3:08
6.	"She's Gettin' a Rock"	Garry Laron Phelps	3:19
7.	"Big Heart"	Gibson, Miller, Freddy Weller	3:43
8.	"An Offer Her Heart Can't Refuse"	Gibson, Miller	3:30
9.	"Thank Virginia"	Bunch, Johnson	3:15
10.	"Stone Cold Country"	Gibson, Miller	3:31
11.	"Southern Man"	Gibson, Richard Leigh	3:59

== Personnel ==
Adapted from Where There's Smoke liner notes.

Gibson/Miller Band

- Mike Daly – steel guitar, lap steel guitar
- Dave Gibson – lead vocals, guitar
- Bryan Grassmeyer – bass guitar, background vocals
- Steve Grossman – drums, percussion
- Blue Miller – lead vocals, lead guitar

Additional musicians

- Bruce Bouton – steel guitar
- Mark Morris – percussion
- Steve Nathan – Hammond B-3 organ
- Biff Watson – rhythm guitar
- John Willis – rhythm guitar

Technical

- Tommy Cooper – engineering
- Doug Johnson – producer, engineering
- Blue Miller – associate producer
- Denny Purcell – mastering
- Ed Seay – recording, mixing
