= Michael Tronick =

American film editor

- Born: March 2, 1949 (age 76); Los Angeles, California, U.S.
- Occupation: Film editor

Michael Tronick (born March 2, 1949) is an American film editor with more than 25 film credits. He has been nominated twice for American Cinema Editors "Eddie" Awards for Scent of a Woman (1992) and for Hairspray (2007).

Since 2012, Tronick has served as a member of the board of governors of the Academy of Motion Picture Arts and Sciences Editors Branch.

Tronick is a member of the academy's Science and Technology Council and was previously selected for membership in the American Cinema Editors.

== Filmography ==
This filmography is a compilation of Tronick's credits as an editor.

Editor
Year	Film	Director	Notes
1984	Streets of Fire	Walter Hill	Second collaboration with Walter Hill
1987	Beverly Hills Cop II	Tony Scott	First collaboration with Tony Scott
1987	Less than Zero	Marek Kanievska	
1988	Midnight Run	Martin Brest	First collaboration with Martin Brest
1990	Revenge	Tony Scott	Second collaboration with Tony Scott
1990	Days of Thunder	Tony Scott	Third collaboration with Tony Scott
1990	The Adventures of Ford Fairlane	Renny Harlin	
1991	The Marrying Man	Jerry Rees	
1991	Hudson Hawk	Michael Lehmann	
1992	Straight Talk	Barnet Kellman	
1992	Scent of a Woman	Martin Brest	Second collaboration with Martin Brest
1993	True Romance	Tony Scott	Fifth collaboration with Tony Scott
1994	The Cowboy Way	Gregg Champion	
1994	Little Giants	Duwayne Dunham	
1995	Under Siege 2: Dark Territory	Geoff Murphy	
1996	Eraser	Chuck Russell	First collaboration with Chuck Russell
1997	Volcano	Mick Jackson	
1998	Meet Joe Black	Martin Brest	Third collaboration with Martin Brest
1999	Blue Streak	Les Mayfield	First collaboration with Les Mayfield
2000	Remember the Titans	Boaz Yakin	
2001	American Outlaws	Les Mayfield	Second collaboration with Les Mayfield
2002	The Scorpion King	Chuck Russell	Second collaboration with Chuck Russell
2003	S.W.A.T.	Clark Johnson	
2005	Mr. & Mrs. Smith	Doug Liman	
2007	Hairspray	Adam Shankman	First collaboration with Adam Shankman
2008	Bedtime Stories	Adam Shankman	Second collaboration with Adam Shankman
2011	The Green Hornet	Michel Gondry	
2011	New Year's Eve	Garry Marshall	Second collaboration with Garry Marshall
2012	Act of Valor	Mouse McCoy; Scott Waugh	
2013	2 Guns	Baltasar Kormákur	
2015	Unfinished Business	Ken Scott	
2015	The 33	Patricia Riggen	
2015	Straight Outta Compton	F. Gary Gray	First collaboration with F. Gary Gray
2017	Bright	David Ayer	Second collaboration with David Ayer
2018	Tomb Raider	Roar Uthaug	
2020	Jingle Jangle: A Christmas Journey	David E. Talbert	

Editorial department
Year	Film	Director	Role	Notes
1990	Revenge	Tony Scott	Film editor	
1991	F/X2	Richard Franklin	Additional editor	
1991	The Last Boy Scout	Tony Scott	Additional editor	Fourth collaboration with Tony Scott
2007	Gone Baby Gone	Ben Affleck	Additional editor	
2008	Iron Man	Jon Favreau	Additional editor	
2010	The Wolfman	Joe Johnston	Additional editor	
2011	Battle: Los Angeles	Jonathan Liebesman	Additional editor	
2011	Abduction	John Singleton	Additional editor	
2016	Warcraft	Duncan Jones	Additional editor	
2016	Suicide Squad	David Ayer	Editor	First collaboration with David Ayer
2016	Ben-Hur	Timur Bekmambetov	Additional editor	
2018	Outlaw King	David Mackenzie	Post-production consultant	

Music department
Year	Film	Director	Role	Notes
1977	Outlaw Blues	Richard T. Heffron	Music editor	
1977	Semi-Tough	Michael Ritchie	Music editor	First collaboration with Michael Ritchie
1978	Mean Dog Blues	Mel Stuart	Music editor	
1978	The One Man Jury	Charles Martin	Music editor	
1978	Movie Movie	Stanley Donen	Music editor	
1979	California Dreaming	John D. Hancock	Music editor	
1979	Sunnyside	Timothy Galfas	Music editor	
1979	All That Jazz	Bob Fosse	Musical editor	First collaboration with Bob Fosse
1980	The Island	Michael Ritchie	Music editor	Second collaboration with Michael Ritchie
1980	Xanadu	Robert Greenwald	Music editor	
1981	All Night Long	Jean-Claude Tramont	Music editor	
1981	Death Hunt	Peter Hunt	Music editor	
1981	Zoot Suit	Luis Valdez	Music editor	
1981	Looker	Michael Crichton	Music editor	
1981	Reds	Warren Beatty	Music editor	
1982	Young Doctors in Love	Garry Marshall	Music editor	First collaboration with Garry Marshall
1982	Jekyll and Hyde... Together Again	Jerry Belson	Music editor	
1982	48 Hrs.	Walter Hill	Music editor	First collaboration with Walter Hill
1983	Star 80	Bob Fosse	Music editor	Second collaboration with Bob Fosse
1983	Romantic Comedy	Arthur Hiller	Music editor	First collaboration with Arthur Hiller
1984	Streets of Fire	Walter Hill	Music editor	
1984	Body Rock	Marcelo Epstein	Music editor	
1985	A Chorus Line	Richard Attenborough	Music editor	
1986	Off Beat	Michael Dinner	Music editor	
1986	Ruthless People	Jim Abrahams; David Zucker; Jerry Zucker	Music editor	
1986	Tough Guys	Jeff Kanew	Music editor	
1986	Nobody's Fool	Evelyn Purcell	Music editor	
1987	Outrageous Fortune	Arthur Hiller	Music editor	Second collaboration with Arthur Hiller
1987	Predator	John McTiernan	Music editor	

Producer
Year	Film	Director	Credit
2002	The Scorpion King	Chuck Russell	Associate producer

Soundtrack
Year	Film	Director	Role
1983	Star 80	Bob Fosse	Lyrics: "Off Ramp" and "Improvise"

Thanks
Year	Film	Director	Role	Notes
2009	Law Abiding Citizen	F. Gary Gray	Thanks	First collaboration with F. Gary Gray
2016	Hail, Caesar!	Joel Coen; Ethan Coen	Special thanks	
2016	Alice Through the Looking Glass	James Bobin	Special thanks	
2018	Hotel Artemis	Drew Pearce	Special thanks	

Documentaries
Year	Film	Director	Notes
2008	Hannah Montana & Miley Cyrus: Best of Both Worlds Concert	Bruce Hendricks	Concert film
2009	Jonas Brothers: The 3D Concert Experience	Bruce Hendricks	Concert film
