= Cheap Thrills =

Cheap Thrills may refer to:

== Music ==
- The Cheap Thrills, an English band

=== Albums ===
- Cheap Thrills (Big Brother and the Holding Company album), 1968
- Cheap Thrills (Confederate Railroad album), 2007
- Cheap Thrills (Frank Zappa album), 1998

=== Songs ===
- "Cheap Thrills" (song), a 2016 song by Sia
- "Cheap Thrills", a 1968 song by Frank Zappa from Cruising with Ruben & the Jets
- "Cheap Thrills", a 1983 song by David Allan Coe
- "Cheap Thrills", a 1983 song by Planet Patrol

== Other uses ==
- Cheap Thrills (film), a 2013 black comedy thriller
- Cheap Thrills, a 1972 book on popular fiction by Ron Goulart
- "Cheap Thrills" (This Life), a 1996 television episode

== See also ==
- Cheaper Thrills
- No Cheap Thrill
