= Big Heart =

Single by Gibson/Miller Band

from the album Where There's Smoke...
- Released: November 14, 1992
- Genre: Country
- Length: 3:43
- Label: Epic
- Songwriters: Dave Gibson, Blue Miller, Freddy Weller
- Producers: Doug Johnson, Blue Miller

Gibson/Miller Band singles chronology
"Big Heart" (1992)	"High Rollin'" (1993)

"Big Heart" is a debut song recorded by American country music group Gibson/Miller Band. It was released in November 1992 as the first single from the album Where There's Smoke.... The song reached #37 on the Billboard Hot Country Songs & Tracks chart. The song was written by group members Dave Gibson and Blue Miller, along with Freddy Weller.

== Critical reception ==
The song was promoted to DJs with a special cassette and a questionnaire to see if DJs could guess the identities of Gibson and Miller.

A review in Gavin Report wrote of the song, "They've come up with a very rockin' sound -are we calling this 'Turbo Country?'"

== Chart performance ==
Chart (1992–1993)	Peak position
US Hot Country Songs (Billboard)	37
Canadian RPM Country Tracks	58
