= Daddy Never Was the Cadillac Kind =

Single by Confederate Railroad

from the album Notorious
- B-side: "Jesus and Mama"
- Released: March 12, 1994
- Recorded: 1993
- Genre: Country, country rock
- Length: 3:43
- Label: Atlantic
- Songwriters: Dave Gibson, Bernie Nelson
- Producer: Barry Beckett

Confederate Railroad singles chronology
"She Never Cried" (1993)	"Daddy Never Was the Cadillac Kind" (1994)	"Elvis and Andy" (1994)

"Daddy Never Was the Cadillac Kind" is a song written by Dave Gibson and Bernie Nelson, and recorded by American country music band Confederate Railroad. It was released in 1994 as the lead-off single from their album Notorious. It peaked at number 9 the United States, and number 7 in Canada. It is their last top ten in the United States.

== Content ==
The song is about the narrator's father, who rejects the concepts of material wealth when his son purchases a Cadillac automobile. In the final verse, the father dies and his body is ironically driven off in a Cadillac Hearse to his burial site.

== Music video ==
The music video was directed by Martin Kahan, and is entirely in black and white.

== Chart positions ==
Chart (1994)	Peak position
Canada Country Singles (RPM)	7
US Hot Country Songs (Billboard)	9

=== Year-end charts ===
Chart (1994)	Position
Canada Country Tracks (RPM)	90
