= How a Cowgirl Says Goodbye =

Single by Tracy Lawrence

from the album The Coast Is Clear
- Released: May 26, 1997
- Recorded: 1997
- Genre: Country
- Length: 3:32
- Label: Atlantic
- Songwriters: Larry Boone, Tracy Lawrence, Paul Nelson
- Producer: Don Cook

Tracy Lawrence singles chronology
"Better Man, Better Off" (1997)	"How a Cowgirl Says Goodbye" (1997)	"The Coast Is Clear" (1997)

"How a Cowgirl Says Goodbye" is a song co-written and recorded by American country music artist Tracy Lawrence. It was released in May 1997 as the second single from his album The Coast Is Clear. It peaked at number 4 on the United States Billboard Hot Country Singles & Tracks chart at number 5 on the Canadian RPM Country Tracks chart. Lawrence wrote the song with Larry Boone and Paul Nelson.

== Content ==
Deborah Evans Price of Billboard magazine referred to it as a "love gone wrong" song.

== Critical reception ==
Deborah Evans Price, of Billboard magazine reviewed the song favorably, saying that "streams of Mexicali guitar flourishes add flavor." She goes on to say that Lawrence's "self-assured vocal and Cook's skilled production make for an enjoyable outing."

== Music video ==
The music video was directed by Michael Merriman and premiered in mid-1997.

== Chart positions ==
"How a Cowgirl Says Goodbye" debuted at number 67 on the U.S. Billboard Hot Country Singles & Tracks for the week of May 31, 1997.

Chart (1997)	Peak position
Canada Country Singles (RPM)	5
US Hot Country Songs (Billboard)	4

=== Year-end charts ===
Chart (1997)	Position
Canada Country Tracks (RPM)	56
US Country Songs (Billboard)	27
