= Wine Me Up =

1969 single by Faron Young

Single by Faron Young

from the album Wine Me Up
- B-side: "That's Where My Baby Feels at Home"
- Released: May 1969
- Genre: Country
- Length: 2:28
- Label: Mercury
- Songwriters: Faron Young; Billy Deaton
- Producer: Jerry Kennedy

Faron Young singles chronology
"I've Got Precious Memories" (1969)	"Wine Me Up" (1969)	"Your Time's Coming" (1969)

"Wine Me Up" is a song first recorded by American country music artist Faron Young. It was released in May 1969 as the first single from his album, Wine Me Up. The song peaked at number 2 on the Billboard Hot Country Singles chart and reached number 3 on the RPM Country Tracks chart in Canada.

The authorship of the song has been a source of confusion. Various combinations of Faron Young, Eddie Crandell and Billy Deaton have been credited on the many different artist releases of the song over the years. To paraphrase Faron Young and Frank Oakley, on P. 120-121 of his 2007 biography, "Live Fast, Love Hard: The Faron Young Story" by Diane Diekman, Carl Belew and Van Givens wrote "Wine Me Up". They were working for 4 Star Records at the time and without permission, Belew and Givens sold the song rights to Faron Young and Frank Oakley under the premise that their wives had written the song. At the same time, Belew also sold the song rights to a man named Eddie Crandell. Faron's original single listed his name and Crandell's as the "songwriters". Once the song hit the charts 4 Star sued Faron and Oakley (and presumably Crandell). Faron and Oakley eventually ceded the publishing rights back to 4 Star, but retained ownership of the song (75% Faron/25% Oakley). At a later date Oakley sold his interest in the song to Faron's new manager, Billy Deaton.

== Chart performance ==
Chart (1969)	Peak position
U.S. Billboard Hot Country Singles	2
Canadian RPM Country Tracks	3

== Larry Boone version ==
"Wine Me Up"

Single by Larry Boone

from the album Swingin' Doors, Sawdust Floors
- B-side: "Old Coyote Town"
- Released: February 1989
- Genre: Country
- Length: 2:21
- Label: Mercury
- Songwriters: Faron Young; Billy Deaton
- Producer: Ray Baker

Larry Boone singles chronology
"I Just Called to Say Goodbye Again" (1988)	"Wine Me Up" (1989)	"Fool's Paradise" (1989)

"Wine Me Up" was covered by American country music artist Larry Boone on his album Swingin' Doors, Sawdust Floors. It was released in February 1989 as the album's second single. Boone's version peaked at number 19 on the Billboard Hot Country Singles chart and reached number 36 on the RPM Country Tracks chart in Canada.

=== Chart performance ===
Chart (1989)	Peak position
Canada Country Singles (RPM)	36
US Hot Country Songs (Billboard)	19

== Other versions ==
- Ernest Tubb covered the song on his 1970 album Good Year for the Wine.
- Gary Allan covered the song on his 1996 album Used Heart for Sale.
- Tanya Tucker covered the song on her 2009 album My Turn.
- Lorrie Morgan covered the song on her 2009 album A Moment in Time.
- Mel Street covered the song on his 1975 album Smokey Mountain Memories.
- Jerry Wallace covered the song on his 1972 album To Get to You.
- Johnny Bush covered the song on his 1970 album Bush Country.
