= Better Man, Better Off =

Single by Tracy Lawrence

from the album The Coast Is Clear
- Released: February 22, 1997
- Recorded: 1996
- Genre: Country
- Length: 3:35
- Label: Atlantic
- Songwriters: Stan Paul Davis; Brett Jones
- Producers: Flip Anderson; Tracy Lawrence

Tracy Lawrence singles chronology
"Is That a Tear" (1996)	"Better Man, Better Off" (1997)	"How a Cowgirl Says Goodbye" (1997)

"Better Man, Better Off" is a song written by Stan Paul Davis and Brett Jones, and recorded by American country music artist Tracy Lawrence. It was released in February 1997 as the first single from his album The Coast Is Clear. The song was Lawrence's eighteenth chart single and it peaked at number 2 on the U.S. Billboard Hot Country Singles & Tracks charts in 1997 and reached number 3 on the Canadian RPM Country Tracks chart. It also peaked at number 8 on the U.S. Billboard Bubbling Under Hot 100 chart.

== Content ==
"Better Man, Better Off" is a mid-tempo in the key of D major. In it, the narrator admits his mistakes in a failed relationship, but says that he will be a "better man, better off" for having learned from his mistakes.

== Critical reception ==
Deborah Evans Price, of Billboard magazine reviewed the song favorably, calling it lyrically similar to Clint Black's "A Better Man". She goes on to say that the production "gives the tune a radio-ready feel, and Lawrence sings with a believeability [sic] that adds to the strength of the song."

== Music video ==
The music video was directed by Michael Merriman, and premiered on CMT on February 24, 1997. Tracy Lawrence no longer had a mullet, so he shaved off his mustache, and his hair was shorter.

== Personnel ==
Compiled from the liner notes.

- Mark Casstevens – acoustic guitar
- Deryl Dodd – background vocals
- Paul Franklin – steel guitar
- Rob Hajacos – fiddle
- Tony Harrell – piano, keyboards
- Liana Manis – background vocals
- Terry McMillan – percussion
- Dave Pomeroy – bass guitar
- Brent Rowan – electric guitar, mandolin
- Milton Sledge – drums

== Chart positions ==
"Better Man, Better Off" debuted at number 55 on the U.S. Billboard Hot Country Singles & Tracks for the week of February 22, 1997.

Chart (1997)	Peak position
Canada Country Singles (RPM)	3
US Bubbling Under Hot 100 (Billboard)	8
US Hot Country Songs (Billboard)	2

=== Year-end charts ===
Chart (1997)	Position
Canada Country Tracks (RPM)	37
US Country Songs (Billboard)	8
