= Stars over Texas =

Single by Tracy Lawrence

from the album Time Marches On
- B-side: "Is That a Tear" 7" single
- Released: July 15, 1996
- Genre: Country
- Length: 3:33
- Label: Atlantic
- Songwriters: Larry Boone; Tracy Lawrence; Paul Nelson
- Producers: Tracy Lawrence; Flip Anderson

Tracy Lawrence singles chronology
"Time Marches On" (1996)	"Stars over Texas" (1996)	"Is That a Tear" (1996)

"Stars over Texas" is a song by American country music artist Tracy Lawrence. It was released in July 1996, as the third single from his album Time Marches On. Lawrence wrote the song with Larry Boone and Paul Nelson, and produced it with Flip Anderson

The song peaked at number 2 on the U.S. Billboard Hot Country Songs chart, and peaked at number 42 on the Canadian RPM Country Tracks chart.

== Charts ==
"Stars over Texas" debuted at number 66 on the U.S. Billboard Hot Country Singles & Tracks for the week of July 27, 1996.

Chart (1996)	Peak position
Canada Country Singles (RPM)	42
US Hot Country Songs (Billboard)	2

=== Year-end charts ===
Chart (1996)	Position
US Country Songs (Billboard)	56
