= The Cowboy Way (film) =

- Theatrical release poster
- Directed by: Gregg Champion
- Written by: William D. Wittliff
- Story by: Rob Thompson; William D. Wittliff
- Produced by: Brian Grazer
- Starring: Woody Harrelson; Kiefer Sutherland; Dylan McDermott; Ernie Hudson
- Cinematography: Dean Semler
- Edited by: Michael Tronick
- Music by: David Newman; Bon Jovi (songs)
- Production company: Imagine Entertainment
- Distributed by: Universal Pictures
- Release date: June 3, 1994
- Running time: 107 minutes
- Country: United States
- Language: English
- Budget: $35 million
- Box office: $25 million

The Cowboy Way is a 1994 American neo-Western buddy comedy action film directed by Gregg Champion and written by William D. Wittliff from an original story by Wittliff and Rob Thompson.

The film stars Woody Harrelson and Kiefer Sutherland as a pair of rodeo champion cowboy best friends who travel from rural New Mexico to New York City to find their missing friend who got caught on the wrong side of a New York crime boss.

== Plot ==
The Cowboy Way follows two championship rodeo stars and lifelong best friends, Pepper Lewis and Sonny Gilstrap as they travel from New Mexico to New York City in search of their missing friend, Nacho Salazar, who came to the city to pay for his daughter's trip to the U.S. from Cuba. When they discover that he's been murdered, the pair set out to find the killer.

== Cast ==
- Woody Harrelson as Pepper Lewis
- Kiefer Sutherland as Sonny Gilstrap
- Dylan McDermott as John Stark
- Ernie Hudson as Officer Sam 'Mad Dog' Shaw
- Cara Buono as Teresa Salazar
- Marg Helgenberger as Margarette
- Tomas Milian as Manny Huerta
- Luis Guzmán as Chango
- Angel Caban as Boca
- Matthew Cowles as Pop Fly
- Joaquín Martínez as Nacho Salazar
- Allison Janney as NYPD Computer Operator
- Christopher Durang as Waldorf Astoria waiter

In addition, Travis Tritt makes a cameo appearance.

== Production ==
The film was originally written under the title of Pistoleers by Rob Thompson in 1986. William D. Wittliff was hired by the studio to rewrite the script, and detailing his experience remarked:

My first couple of drafts were set in New York City--then Crocodile Dundee came out and the studio asked me to reset the story in Washington, D. C. to avoid comparison. Against my better judgment I agreed to give it a try and the whole thing (meaning the writing) went downhill after that."

Nick Castle developed a draft of the script in 1989 that ultimately went unused.

In January 1993, it was reported that Woody Harrelson and Brad Pitt were being courted by Imagine Entertainment to star in the William D. Wittliff scripted action-adventure film The Cowboy Way about two New Mexico cowboys who travel to New York City to rescue their ranch hand's kidnapped daughter. In April of that year, Gregg Champion was set to direct with Harrelson confirmed as one of the leads with the search for a co-lead continuing. By June, Kiefer Sutherland was in final negotiations to star in the film alongside Harrelson. According to Harrelson, he'd been trying to star The Cowboy Way for years with the script having once been positioned as a Kevin Costner vehicle with Costner even contributing to one of the drafts of the script.

== Release ==
The film was theatrically released on June 3, 1994. A home video release followed on October 26, 1994.

== Reception ==
On the review aggregator website Rotten Tomatoes, 27% of 15 critics' reviews are positive.

Joe Brown of The Washington Post wrote, "The Cowboy Way is a weak rehashing of the Crocodile Dundee gimmick: two modern-day cowboys taming the Wild East. The tired formula may still have some life left in it, but not this 'Way'. This dud ranch is saddled with the charisma-free teaming of dumb guns Woody Harrelson and Kiefer Sutherland."

== Year-end lists ==
- 5th worst – Robert Denerstein, Rocky Mountain News
- Top 10 worst (listed alphabetically, not ranked) – Mike Mayo, The Roanoke Times
- Dishonorable mention – Dan Craft, The Pantagraph
- #8 Worst - Jeffrey Lyons, Sneak Previews

== Box office ==
The Cowboy Way debuted at number 5 at the US box office and went on to gross $20 million in the United States and Canada and $25 million worldwide.

== Soundtrack ==
- Good Guys Don't Always Wear White - Bon Jovi
- The Cowboy Way - Travis Tritt
- Mamas Don't Let Your Babies Grow Up to Be Cowboys - Gibson/Miller Band
- Blue Danube Blues - Cracker
- No One to Run With - The Allman Brothers Band
- On Broadway - Jeff Beck & Paul Rodgers
- Days Gone By - James House
- Candy Says - Blind Melon
- Too Far Gone - Emmylou Harris
- Sonny Rides Again - George Thorogood & The Destroyers
- Free Your Mind - En Vogue
- Suicide Blonde - INXS
