= Daisy Dern =

American singer-songwriter

- Born: ca. 1967
- Origin: California, United States
- Genres: Country
- Occupation: Singer-songwriter
- Instruments: Vocals, piano
- Years active: 2001–present
- Label: Mercury Nashville
- Spouse: Dave Gibson

Daisy Dern is an American country music artist. Signed to Mercury Records in 2002, Dern released one single, "Gettin' Back to You", which charted on the Hot Country Songs charts. An album for Mercury was never released on the label, although she later released it independently.

== Biography ==
Daisy Dern is a distant cousin of actors Bruce and Laura Dern. She was raised in the San Francisco Bay area of California, and in 1991 she received a degree in music business from San Francisco State University after designing a special major to suit her interests. Dern also attended UC Santa Cruz and Berklee College of Music in Boston, Massachusetts. Dern was inspired by country music, as well as more pop influenced acts such as Linda Ronstadt and James Taylor.

Dern moved to Nashville to pursue a career in music in 1994. She met Dave Gibson, former lead vocalist of the Gibson/Miller Band, with whom she began co-writing music, before marrying him in 1997. They have one daughter, born in 1999.

Dern began work on her self-titled debut album in late 2000. Its lead-off single, "Gettin' Back to You", spent fifteen weeks on the Billboard Hot Country Singles & Tracks (now Hot Country Songs) charts and peaked at number 43. Several other tracks were included on her debut, one of which was co-written by her daughter's pediatrician.

Dern and Gibson have a daughter, Savannah, whom they named their publishing company/record label after. Savannah Music Group, Inc., was founded in 2008.

== Singles ==
Year	Single	Chart Positions	Album
Year	Single	US Country	Album
2001	"Gettin' Back to You"	43	Little Dreams (unreleased)
