= High Rollin' =

Single by Gibson/Miller Band

from the album Where There's Smoke...
- B-side: "Stone Cold Country"
- Released: February 13, 1993
- Genre: Country
- Length: 3:32
- Label: Epic
- Songwriters: Dave Gibson, Blue Miller
- Producer: Doug Johnson

Gibson/Miller Band singles chronology
"Big Heart" (1992)	"High Rollin'" (1993)	"Texas Tattoo" (1993)

"High Rollin'" is a song written by Dave Gibson and Blue Miller, and recorded by American country music group Gibson/Miller Band. It was released in February 1993 as the second single from the album Where There's Smoke.... The song is the group's highest charting single, reaching number 20 on the Billboard Hot Country Singles & Tracks chart.

== Chart performance ==
Chart (1993)	Peak position
Canada Country Singles (RPM)	18
US Hot Country Songs (Billboard)	20
