= Lonely (Tracy Lawrence song) =

2000 song by Tracy Lawrence

Single by Tracy Lawrence

from the album Lessons Learned
- Released: May 27, 2000
- Genre: Country
- Length: 3:09
- Label: Atlantic
- Songwriters: Robin Lee Bruce; Roxie Dean
- Producers: Flip Anderson; Butch Carr; Tracy Lawrence

Tracy Lawrence singles chronology
"Lessons Learned" (1999)	"Lonely" (2000)	"Unforgiven" (2001)

"Lonely" is a song written by Robin Lee Bruce and Roxie Dean, and recorded by American country music artist Tracy Lawrence. It was released in May 2000 as the second single from the album Lessons Learned. The song reached #18 on the Billboard Hot Country Singles & Tracks chart.

== Chart performance ==
Chart (2000)	Peak position
Canada Country Singles (RPM)	24
US Bubbling Under Hot 100 (Billboard)	6
US Hot Country Songs (Billboard)	18

=== Year-end charts ===
Chart (2000)	Position
US Country Songs (Billboard)	68
