= She Never Cried =

Single by Confederate Railroad

from the album Confederate Railroad
- Released: December 11, 1993
- Genre: Country
- Length: 3:26
- Label: Atlantic
- Songwriter(s): Freddy Weller, Danny Mayo, Diana Rae
- Producer(s): Barry Beckett

Confederate Railroad singles chronology
"Trashy Women" (1993)	"She Never Cried" (1993)	"Daddy Never Was the Cadillac Kind" (1994)

"She Never Cried" is a song recorded by American country music group Confederate Railroad. It was released in December 1993 as the sixth and final single from the album Confederate Railroad. The song reached #27 on the Billboard Hot Country Singles & Tracks chart. The song was written by Freddy Weller, Danny Mayo and Diana Rae.

== Content ==
The song describes a relationship near its end with a woman the singer had met through a personal ad. He initially fell in love, but she quickly began showing signs of being a bad fit for him: refused to stand for the national anthem, was not a Christian, preferred Barry Manilow music over John Wayne movies, "never cried when Old Yeller died" and ultimately she used profanity in front of his mother. In looking back, he states that he has no intention of crying when she finally decides to leave.

== Chart performance ==
Chart (1993–1994)	Peak position
US Hot Country Songs (Billboard)	27
Canadian RPM Country Tracks	28
