= I Just Called to Say Goodbye Again =

Single by Larry Boone

from the album Swingin' Doors, Sawdust Floors
- B-side: "Reason for the Rain"
- Released: October 1988
- Genre: Country
- Length: 3:14
- Label: Mercury
- Songwriters: Bud McGuire; Paul Nelson
- Producer: Ray Baker

Larry Boone singles chronology
| "Don't Give Candy to a Stranger" (1988) | "I Just Called to Say Goodbye Again" (1988) | "Wine Me Up" (1989) |

"I Just Called to Say Goodbye Again" is a song written by Bud McGuire and Paul Nelson and recorded by American country music artist Larry Boone. It was released in October 1988 as the first single from his second album, Swingin' Doors, Sawdust Floors. The song peaked at number 16 on the Billboard Hot Country Singles chart.

== Chart performance ==
| Chart (1988–1989) | Peak position |
|---|---|
| Canada Country Tracks (RPM) | 37 |
| US Hot Country Songs (Billboard) | 16 |
