= Cheap Thrills (Confederate Railroad album) =

Studio album by Confederate Railroad
- Released: April 24, 2007
- Genre: Country
- Length: 38:00
- Label: Shanachie
- Producer: Blue Miller

Confederate Railroad chronology
Unleashed (2001)	Cheap Thrills (2007)	Lucky to Be Alive (2016)

Cheap Thrills is the sixth studio album by the American country music band Confederate Railroad. It was issued by Shanachie in 2007. The album is composed of cover songs by country music and Southern rock artists.

Michael Sudhalter of Country Standard Time gave the album a generally positive review, saying that the album showed the band's Southern rock and honky-tonk influences. He thought that the covers of Alan Jackson and Joe Diffie songs were "lowlights".

== Track listing ==
1. "11 Months and 29 Days" (Johnny Paycheck, Billy Sherrill) – 3:30
2. "Hard Livin'" (David Halley) – 3:05
3. "Don't Rock the Jukebox" (Alan Jackson, Keith Stegall, Roger Murrah) – 2:52
4. "Whiskey on Ice" (Hank Williams, Jr., Tony Stampley, Bobby Keel) – 2:48
5. "Cheap Thrills" (Bob McDill) – 3:25
6. "Georgia on a Fast Train" (Billy Joe Shaver) – 3:12
7. "Honky Tonk Heroes" (Shaver) – 3:43
8. "Trudy" (Charlie Daniels) – 4:43
9. "Please Come to Boston" (Dave Loggins) – 4:20
10. "New Way (To Light Up an Old Flame)" (Joe Diffie, Lonnie Wilson) – 2:45
11. "I Know a Little" (Steve Gaines) – 3:37

== Personnel ==
Confederate Railroad

- Jimmy Dormire - electric guitar
- Mark Dufresne - drums
- Cody McCarver - keyboards, background vocals
- Gates Nichols - dobro, steel guitar
- Wayne Secrest - bass guitar
- Danny Shirley - acoustic guitar, lead vocals

Additional musicians

- Mark Beckett - drums, percussion
- James Fletcher - electric guitar
- Tony Harrell - piano, Hammond organ, Wurlitzer
- Blue Miller - acoustic guitar, electric guitar, background vocals
