= Is That a Tear =

Single by Tracy Lawrence

from the album Time Marches On
- Released: November 26, 1996
- Recorded: 1995
- Genre: Country
- Length: 3:18
- Label: Atlantic
- Songwriters: John Jarrard; Kenny Beard
- Producers: Tracy Lawrence; Flip Anderson

Tracy Lawrence singles chronology
"Stars over Texas" (1996)	"Is That a Tear" (1996)	"Better Man, Better Off" (1997)

"Is That a Tear" is a song written by John Jarrard and Kenny Beard, and recorded by American country music artist Tracy Lawrence. It was released on November 26, 1996 as the fourth and final single from his album Time Marches On. It peaked at number two on the United States Billboard Hot Country Singles & Tracks chart, while it was a number-one hit in Canada.

== Content ==
"Is That a Tear" is a mid-tempo song prominently featuring the fiddle and steel guitar. It begins when the narrator finds an unexpected message on his phone from an estranged lover. In the message, she says she's sorry she missed him and that she's doing fine. He plays the message over and over again, swearing he heard sadness and regret, or "a tear" in her voice. The song ends with the narrator contemplating whether he should call her back.

== Music video ==
The music video was directed by Marc Ball, and premiered on CMT on November 28, 1996. Beginning with the ending of the video for "Texas Tornado", then it leads into Lawrence driving a taxicab, and helping a woman follow a group of men for an undisclosed purpose. It was the last video to feature Lawrence's trademark mullet and mustache, which he sported from 1991 to 1996.

== Chart positions ==
Chart (1996–1997)	Peak position
Canada Country Singles (RPM)	1
US Bubbling Under Hot 100 (Billboard)	4
US Hot Country Songs (Billboard)	2

=== Year-end charts ===
Chart (1997)	Position
Canada Country Tracks (RPM)	30
US Country Songs (Billboard)	36
