= Don't Give Candy to a Stranger =

Single by Larry Boone

from the album Larry Boone
- B-side: "Back in the Swing of Things"
- Released: May 1988
- Genre: Country
- Length: 3:17
- Label: Mercury Nashville
- Songwriter(s): Larry Boone; Dave Gibson; Jimbeau Hinson
- Producer(s): Ray Baker

Larry Boone singles chronology
"Stop Me (If You Heard This One Before)" (1988)	"Don't Give Candy to a Stranger" (1988)	"I Just Called to Say Goodbye Again" (1988)

"Don't Give Candy to a Stranger" is a song co-written and recorded by American country music artist Larry Boone. It was released in May 1988 as the seventh single from his self-titled debut album. The song peaked at number 10 on the Billboard Hot Country Singles chart. It was his first Top 10 Hit. Boone wrote the song, along with Dave Gibson and Jimbeau Hinson.

== Charts ==
=== Weekly charts ===
Chart (1988)	Peak position
US Hot Country Songs (Billboard)	10

=== Year-end charts ===
Chart (1988)	Position
US Hot Country Songs (Billboard)	88
