= Dear John (Hank Williams song) =

Single by Hank Williams With His Drifting Cowboys
- B-side: "Cold, Cold Heart"
- Released: February 2, 1951
- Recorded: December 21, 1950
- Studio: Castle Studio, Tulane Hotel, Nashville
- Genre: Country, honky-tonk, blues
- Length: 2:33
- Label: MGM K10904
- Songwriters: Tex Ritter, Aubrey Gass
- Producer: Fred Rose

Hank Williams With His Drifting Cowboys singles chronology
| "Moanin' the Blues" (1951) | "Dear John" (1951) | "Howlin' at the Moon" (1951) |

"Dear John" is a song written by Tex Ritter and Aubrey Gass. It is best remembered for being the A-side to Hank Williams' number one hit "Cold, Cold Heart" in 1951 for MGM Records.

== Background ==
According to Colin Escott's 2004 biography of Hank Williams, producer Fred Rose initially saw "Cold, Cold Heart" as a B-side and regarded "Dear John" a more appropriate A-side, since jukeboxes preferred up-tempo singles. The song was originally recorded by Jim Boyd, younger brother of Dallas-based western swing artist Bill Boyd. Eventually Tex Ritter got a credit on the song likely after promising songwriter Aubrey Gass he would get the song cut by a big name or get Gass a contract with his label Capitol if he got a piece of the composition. Williams recorded the song at the same session that he cut "Cold, Cold Heart," with Fred Rose producing and backing from Jerry Rivers (fiddle), Don Helms (steel guitar), Sammy Pruett (electric guitar), Chet Atkins (rhythm guitar), and Ernie Newton or "Cedric Rainwater," a.k.a. Howard Watts (bass). As Escott observes: "When Hank and the band hollered the tag line, 'Dear John, I've sent your saddle home,' it invited everyone in the bar, the auditorium, or even the car to holler right along. Once again, the upfront rhythm guitar carried the recording. Hank cruised at the brisk tempo, never once straining."

"Cold, Cold Heart" shot to number one in early 1951, and "Dear John" rode on its coattails to number 8 on the Billboard country singles chart.

In 1996, "Dear John" was referenced by Tracy Lawrence's single "Time Marches On", featuring the lyrics "Hank Williams sings 'Kaw-Liga' and 'Dear John' and time marches on." "Time Marches On" held the number one spot on Billboard’s Hot Country Songs chart for three weeks. In 1999, John Prine covered "Dear John" on his 1999 album In Spite of Ourselves.
