= If You Loved Me =

Single by Tracy Lawrence

from the album Time Marches On
- Released: December 4, 1995
- Recorded: 1995
- Genre: Country
- Length: 3:21
- Label: Atlantic PRCD 6546
- Songwriters: Paul Nelson; Tom Shapiro
- Producer: Don Cook

Tracy Lawrence singles chronology
"If the World Had a Front Porch" (1995)	"If You Loved Me" (1995)	"Time Marches On" (1996)

"If You Loved Me" is a song written by Paul Nelson and Tom Shapiro, and recorded by American country music artist Tracy Lawrence. It was released in December 1995 as the first single from his album Time Marches On. It peaked at number 4 on the U.S. Billboard Hot Country Singles & Tracks chart and at number 4 on the Canadian RPM Country Tracks chart.

== Content ==
In "If You Loved Me", the narrator is consoling a former love of his who is being treated unfairly by her current lover. He tells her that he would be there for her, If you loved me again.

== Critical reception ==
Deborah Evans Price, of Billboard magazine reviewed the song favorably, calling it a "lovely and understated ballad that is brought to life by that yearning, hurtin' country-boy quality in Lawrence's voice." On the production, she says that it "lets the vocals shine and Lawrence turns in a performance devoid of bravado, just full of warmth and heart.

== Chart performance ==
"If You Loved Me" debuted at number 68 on the U.S. Billboard Hot Country Singles & Tracks for the week of December 16, 1995. The song peaked at number 4 on The Billboard Hot Country Singles & Tracks chart and number 4 on Canada's RPM country charts.

Chart (1995–1996)	Peak position
Canada Country Singles (RPM)	4
US Hot Country Songs (Billboard)	4

=== Year-end charts ===
Chart (1996)	Position
Canada Country Tracks (RPM)	64
US Country Songs (Billboard)	33
