= If the World Had a Front Porch =

"If The World Had A Front Porch"

Single by Tracy Lawrence

from the album I See It Now
- Released: August 5, 1995
- Recorded: 1994
- Genre: Country
- Length: 3:05
- Label: Atlantic 87119
- Songwriters: Tracy Lawrence; Paul Nelson; Kenny Beard
- Producer: James Stroud

Tracy Lawrence singles chronology
"Texas Tornado" (1995)	"If The World Had A Front Porch" (1995)	"If You Loved Me" (1995)

"If the World Had a Front Porch" is a song co-written and recorded by American country music singer Tracy Lawrence. It was released in August 1995 as the fourth and final single from his album, I See It Now. The song reached the number 2 on the United States Billboard Hot Country Singles & Tracks chart and peaked at number 7 on the Canadian RPM Country Tracks chart. The CD and Cassette promo singles contain 30-second excerpts from "Texas Tornado", "I'd Give Anything to Be Your Everything Again", and "The Cards", all from the album, I See It Now. The song was written by Lawrence, Paul Nelson and Kenny Beard.

== Content ==
The narrator talks about traditional family values and the old-fashioned sweetness of spending slow summer hours on the front steps.

== Music video ==
The music video was directed by Marc Ball and serves as a solution to the previous five music videos, all of which featured a Quantum Leap theme. After leaving the "Texas Tornado" video, Lawrence flies through a vortex showing scenes from the previous videos. It then features him and a friend using virtual reality helmets. By wearing the helmets, the rest of the video shows Lawrence singing "If the World Had a Front Porch," literally on a front porch, as it flies over various American landscapes. The second verse shows views of drugs being dealt, prostitutes walking the streets, footage of the 1992 Los Angeles riots, the O. J. Simpson police chase and violent footage from the Gulf War before the virtual reality goggles are "overloaded" and the word "ABORT" flashes across the computer and video screen and the scenes are replaced with more pleasant clips of school graduations, young children playing with small animals, weddings, couples having their first child and family dinners. At the end of the video, Lawrence flies back through the vortex on the porch in a bubble.

== Chart performance ==
The song debuted at number 43 on the Hot Country Singles & Tracks chart dated August 5, 1995. It charted for 20 weeks, and peaked at number 2 on the country chart dated October 7, 1995.

=== Charts ===
Chart (1995)	Peak position
Canada Country Singles (RPM)	7
US Hot Country Songs (Billboard)	2

=== Year-end charts ===
Chart (1995)	Position
US Country Songs (Billboard)	10
