= Mammas Don't Let Your Babies Grow Up to Be Cowboys =

1978 single by Waylon Jennings and Willie Nelson

Single by Ed Bruce

from the album Ed Bruce
- B-side: "It's Not What She's Done (It's What You Didn't Do)"
- Released: November 15, 1975
- Genre: Country; outlaw country
- Length: 3:08
- Label: United Artists #732
- Songwriters: Ed Bruce; Patsy Bruce
- Producer: Larry Butler

Ed Bruce singles chronology
"July, You're a Woman" (1973)	"Mammas Don't Let Your Babies Grow Up to Be Cowboys" (1975)	"The Littlest Cowboy Rides Again" (1976)

"Mammas Don't Let Your Babies Grow Up to Be Cowboys" is a country music song first recorded by Ed Bruce, written by him and his wife Patsy Bruce. His version of the song appears on his 1976 self-titled album for United Artists Records. In late 1975 and early 1976, Bruce's rendition of the song went to number 15 on the Hot Country Singles charts. This song was featured on Chris LeDoux's album released January 20, 1976, Songbook of the American West.

Members of the Western Writers of America chose the song as one of the Top 100 Western songs of all time.

== Content ==
The narrator warns mothers not to let their children become cowboys because of the tough and rootless life of cowboy culture.

== Critical reception ==
In 2024, Rolling Stone ranked the song at #69 on its 200 Greatest Country Songs of All Time ranking.

== Chart performance ==
Chart (1975–1976)	Peak position
US Hot Country Songs (Billboard)	15
Canadian RPM Country Tracks	36

== Waylon Jennings/Willie Nelson version ==
"Mammas Don't Let Your Babies Grow Up to Be Cowboys"

Single by Waylon Jennings with Willie Nelson

from the album Waylon & Willie
- B-side: "I Can Get Off on You"
- Released: January 1978
- Genre: Country; outlaw country
- Length: 2:31
- Label: RCA Victor
- Songwriters: Ed Bruce; Patsy Bruce
- Producers: Waylon Jennings; Willie Nelson

Waylon Jennings singles chronology
"The Wurlitzer Prize (I Don't Want to Get Over You)" (1977)	"Mammas Don't Let Your Babies Grow Up to Be Cowboys" (1978)	"There Ain't No Good Chain Gang" (1978)

Willie Nelson singles chronology
"Something to Brag About" (1977)	"Mammas Don't Let Your Babies Grow Up to Be Cowboys" (1978)	"If You Can Touch Her at All" (1978)

Waylon Jennings and Willie Nelson covered the song on their 1978 duet album Waylon & Willie. This rendition peaked at No. 1 in March 1978, spending four weeks atop the country music charts. It also reached 42 on the Billboard Hot 100, and won the 1979 Grammy Award for Best Country Performance by a Duo or Group with Vocal. Also in 1979, Nelson's version was featured in the film The Electric Horseman with Robert Redford and Jane Fonda. It is also featured in a 2015 TV commercial for the Volkswagen Passat engine.

=== Chart performance ===
Chart (1978)	Peak position
US Hot Country Songs (Billboard)	1
US Billboard Hot 100	42
US Adult Contemporary (Billboard)	33
Canadian RPM Country Tracks	1
Canadian RPM Top Singles	57
Canadian RPM Adult Contemporary Tracks	42

=== Certifications ===
Region	Certification	Certified units/sales
New Zealand (RMNZ)	Platinum	30,000^{‡}
^{‡} Sales+streaming figures based on certification alone.

== Gibson/Miller Band version ==
"Mammas Don't Let Your Babies Grow Up to Be Cowboys"

Single by Gibson/Miller Band

from the album Red, White & Blue Collar
- B-side: "Johnny Get Your Gun"
- Released: 1994
- Genre: Country
- Length: 3:27
- Label: Epic
- Songwriters: Ed Bruce; Patsy Bruce
- Producers: Doug Johnson; Blue Miller

Gibson/Miller Band singles chronology
"Stone Cold Country" (1994)	"Mammas Don't Let Your Babies Grow Up to Be Cowboys" (1994)	"Red, White and Blue Collar" (1994)

In 1994, country music group Gibson/Miller Band recorded a cover version on its album Red, White and Blue Collar. This version peaked at #49 on the Hot Country Songs chart, and was featured in the soundtrack for the movie The Cowboy Way. It also appeared on the band's second and final studio album, Red, White and Blue Collar.

=== Chart performance ===
Chart (1994)	Peak position
Canada Country Singles (RPM)	71
US Hot Country Songs (Billboard)	49
