= Sam Neely =

American singer-songwriter (1948–2006)

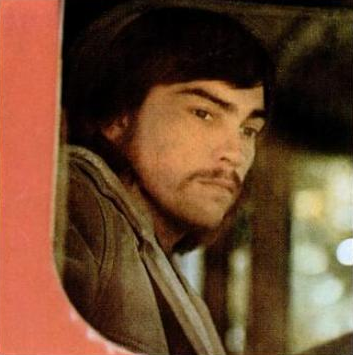
- Sam Neely in 1972

Background information
- Born: August 22, 1948; Cuero, Texas, U.S.
- Died: July 19, 2006 (aged 57) Corpus Christi, Texas, U.S.
- Genres: Country, folk
- Occupations: Musician, singer-songwriter, recording artist, performer
- Instruments: Guitar, vocals
- Years active: 1958-1984
- Labels: A&M, Astro, Capitol, Elektra, MCA, Taliesyn

Sam Neely (August 22, 1948 – July 19, 2006) was an American country and folk music musician, singer-songwriter, recording artist, and performer.

Born in Cuero, Texas, Neely began playing guitar at age ten. After moving with his family to Corpus Christi, Texas, he began playing in bands, including local group, Buckle. He made an appearance on the Merv Griffin Show in 1968 and was asked to write a song for the film, Tilt; though the movie was not released until 1978, it did include Neely's track, "Long Road to Texas".

Neely scored a string of minor hits in the 1970s on the country and pop charts and released a few albums which saw sales success. In 1978, he moved back to Corpus Christi and became the house musician for the Electric Eel. In 1983, he made a comeback on MCA Records.

On July 19, 2006, Neely collapsed and died while mowing his lawn at his home in Corpus Christi. He was 57. A funeral mass was held at St. Patrick Catholic parish in Corpus Christi on July 23, 2006.

== Select discography ==
=== Albums ===
Year	Album	Chart Positions
Year	Album	US
1971	Long Road to Texas	—
1972	Loving You Just Crossed My Mind	147
1973	Two	175
1974	Down Home	202
1981	Two of a Kind	—
2000	Son of the South	—
2002	Sam Neely	—

=== Singles ===
Year	Song	Peak chart positions	
Year	Song	US Country	US
1972	"Loving You Just Crossed My Mind"	—	29
1973	"Rosalie"	—	43
1974	"Sadie Take a Lover"	—	103
1974	"You Can Have Her"	49	34
1975	"Sanctuary (promo)"	—	—
1975	"I Fought the Law"	61	54
1977	"Sail Away"	98	84
1983	"The Party's Over (Everybody's Gone)"	78	—
1983	"When You Leave That Way You Can Never Go Back"	77	—
1984	"Old Photographs"	81	—
