= Lessons Learned (album) =

Studio album by Tracy Lawrence
- Released: February 1, 2000
- Genre: Country
- Length: 36:40
- Label: Atlantic Records
- Producer: Flip Anderson; Tracy Lawrence; Butch Carr

Tracy Lawrence chronology
The Best of Tracy Lawrence (1998)	Lessons Learned (2000)	Tracy Lawrence (2001)

Singles from Lessons Learned
- 1. "Lessons Learned" Released: November 1, 1999; 2. "Lonely" Released: May 27, 2000; 3. "Unforgiven" Released: March 24, 2001

Professional ratings
Review scores
Source	Rating
Allmusic	3/5 stars

Lessons Learned is the sixth studio album by American country music artist Tracy Lawrence. It was released on February 1, 2000 by Atlantic Records. This album produced three singles for Lawrence between 2000 and 2001: the title track, "Lonely", and "Unforgiven", which peaked at #3, #18, and #35, respectively, on the Billboard country singles charts. "Lessons Learned" was also Lawrence's first Top Ten country hit since "How a Cowgirl Says Goodbye" in 1997.

== Track listing ==
No.	Title	Writer(s)	Length
1.	"The Holes That He Dug"	Tracy Lawrence, Flip Anderson, Kenny Beard	3:03
2.	"Long Wet Kiss"	Lawrence, Anderson, Rick Huckaby	2:47
3.	"From the Inside Out"	Lee Thomas Miller, Huckaby	3:18
4.	"Lessons Learned"	Paul Nelson, Larry Boone, Lawrence	2:57
5.	"The Man I Was"	Mark Nesler, Tony Martin	3:20
6.	"Lonely"	Robin Lee Bruce, Roxie Dean	3:08
7.	"Just You and Me"	Anderson, Huckaby	3:40
8.	"Steps"	Monty Criswell, Michael White, Huckaby	3:29
9.	"From Here to Kingdom Come"	JD Souther	3:43
10.	"Up All Night"	Nesler, Martin	3:28
11.	"Unforgiven"	Nelson, Boone, Bobby Pinson	3:47

== Personnel ==
As listed in liner notes

- Sonny Garrish - steel guitar, lap steel guitar
- Jack Gavin - drums, percussion
- Rob Hajacos - fiddle
- Tony Harrell - keyboards
- Rick Huckaby - acoustic guitar, background vocals
- Tracy Lawrence - lead vocals
- B. James Lowry - acoustic guitar
- Gary Lunn - bass guitar
- Liana Manis - background vocals
- Brent Rowan - electric guitar, acoustic guitar
- Joe Spivey - fiddle, mandolin
- John Willis - acoustic guitar, mandolin

Strings on "Just You and Me", "From Here to Kingdom Come" and "Unforgiven" arranged by Kristin Wilkinson and performed by her, David Davidson, David Angell and John Catchings

== Chart performance ==
Chart (2000)	Peak position
U.S. Billboard Top Country Albums	9
U.S. Billboard 200	69
Canadian RPM Country Albums	37
