= Elvis and Andy =

Single by Confederate Railroad

from the album Notorious
- B-side: "Three Verses"
- Released: July 9, 1994
- Genre: Country, country rock, rock and roll
- Length: 3:30
- Label: Atlantic
- Songwriter: Craig Wiseman
- Producer: Barry Beckett

Confederate Railroad singles chronology
"Daddy Never Was the Cadillac Kind" (1994)	"Elvis and Andy" (1994)	"Summer in Dixie" (1994)

"Elvis and Andy" is a song written by Craig Wiseman and recorded by American country music group Confederate Railroad. It was released in July 1994 as the second single from the album Notorious. The song reached #20 on the Billboard Hot Country Singles & Tracks chart.

== Content ==
"Elvis and Andy" is an up-tempo novelty song in which the male narrator states that, while his lover is not from the Southern United States, she "likes Elvis / She likes Andy / So she's fine and dandy with me." Of course, this refers to Elvis Presley and Andy Griffith, due to their photos being on the wall behind the sofa in the music video, which was directed by Martin Kahan and premiered in mid-1994.

== Chart performance ==
Chart (1994)	Peak position
Canada Country Singles (RPM)	8
US Hot Country Songs (Billboard)	20
