= Please Come to Boston =

1974 single by Dave Loggins

Single by Dave Loggins

from the album Apprentice (In a Musical Workshop)
- B-side: "Let Me Go Now"
- Released: May 6, 1974
- Genre: Soft rock; folk rock
- Length: 4:07
- Label: Epic
- Songwriter: Dave Loggins
- Producer: Jerry Crutchfield

Dave Loggins singles chronology
"Think'n of You" (1973)	"Please Come to Boston" (1974)	"Someday" (1974)

"Please Come to Boston" is a song that was recorded and written by American singer-songwriter Dave Loggins. It was released in May 1974 as the first single from his album Apprentice (In a Musical Workshop) and was produced by Jerry Crutchfield. It spent two weeks at number five on the Billboard Hot 100 chart in August 1974 and one week atop the Billboard Easy Listening chart. It was nominated for a Grammy Award in the category Best Male Pop Vocal performance.

== Analysis and history ==
The three verses of the song are each a plea from the narrator to a woman whom he hopes will join him in, respectively, Boston, Denver, and Los Angeles, with each verse concluding: "She said, 'No – boy would you come home to me'"; the woman's sentiment is elaborated on in the chorus which concludes with the line: "I'm the number one fan of the man from Tennessee".

Dave Loggins, born and raised in Tennessee, was inspired to write "Please Come to Boston" by a 1972 tour with the Nitty Gritty Dirt Band which included stops in Boston, Denver and Los Angeles, cities which were new to Loggins. He stated:

The story is almost true, except there wasn't anyone waiting {here} so I made her up. In effect, making the longing for someone stronger. It was a recap to my first trip to each of those cities and out of innocence. That was how I saw each one. The fact of having no one to come home to made the chorus easy to write. Some 40 years later, I still vividly remember that night, and it was as if someone else was writing the song.

== Chart performance ==
Chart (1974)	Peak position
Australia (Kent Music Report)	47
Canadian RPM Top Singles	4
Canadian RPM Adult Contemporary Tracks	2
U.S. Billboard Hot 100	5
U.S. Billboard Easy Listening	1

== Covers ==
The song has been covered numerous times, most notably by country music singer David Allan Coe and folk singer Joan Baez, who actually began her career in the Boston-Cambridge area and included "Please Come to Boston" on her 1976 live album, From Every Stage. As other female singers performing "Please Come to Boston" have done, Baez sings from the perspective of the woman refusing the invitations. Other notable artists covering the track include Reba McEntire, B. W. Stevenson, Tammy Wynette, Garth Brooks, Willie Nelson, Glen Campbell, Babyface, Brandy, Tori Amos, Kenny Chesney, Wade Bowen, Jackopierce, Jimmy Buffett, Lee Hazlewood, Chase Bryant, Confederate Railroad, and Rita Wilson.

== See also ==
- List of number-one adult contemporary singles of 1974 (U.S.)
