= When and Where (song) =

Single by Confederate Railroad

from the album When and Where
- Released: May 13, 1995
- Genre: Country
- Length: 2:23
- Label: Atlantic
- Songwriters: Jeff Pennig, Jess Brown, Brett Jones
- Producer: Barry Beckett

Confederate Railroad singles chronology
"Summer in Dixie" (1994)	"When and Where" (1995)	"Bill's Landromat, Bar and Grill" (1995)

"When and Where" is a song written by Jeff Pennig, Jess Brown and Brett Jones, and recorded by American country music group Confederate Railroad. It was released in May 1995 as the first single and title track from the album When and Where. The song reached #24 on the Billboard Hot Country Singles & Tracks chart.

== Chart performance ==
Chart (1995)	Peak position
Canada Country Singles (RPM)	17
US Hot Country Songs (Billboard)	24
