= When You Leave That Way You Can Never Go Back =

Country music single

Single by Sam Neely
- B-side: "The Music Made Me Do It"
- Released: June 18, 1983
- Genre: Country
- Length: 3:50
- Label: MCA
- Songwriters: Steve Clark, Johnny MacRae
- Producer: Barry Beckett

Sam Neely singles chronology
"The Party's Over (Everybody's Gone)" (1983)	"When You Leave That Way You Can Never Go Back" (1983)	"Old Photographs" (1984)

"When You Leave That Way You Can Never Go Back" is a song written by Steve Clark and Johnny MacRae. The song—a bittersweet reflection of a condemned inmate's life, looking back at all the bridges he burned and wished could be repaired—was recorded by several country music artists, including Sam Neely, Bill Anderson and the band Confederate Railroad.

== Content ==
"When You Leave That Way ...", told in first-person narrative, begins with the man remembering some things about his childhood with fondness: his mother, waking to the rooster's crow and listening to Arthur Godfrey. However, his relationship with his father is very strained; after the two get into a fight one morning, the boy runs away and never returns home, beginning his troublesome life as a drifter.

Later, the man tries to settle down and eventually gets engaged to a young woman; however, on his wedding day, he leaves her standing at the altar. Later, he begins a relationship with a woman who is married; when her husband walks in on them, he shoots and kills him, eventually leading to his death sentence. (Just before the revelation of the latter of these events, within the bridge of the song, he mournfully tells how he wishes he could repair his broken relationships with his parents and hold his young son.)

He burns his final bridge when a clergyman comes into his jail cell to administer the last rites, shortly before he is to be put to death; however, the man tells him to go away.

== Version history ==
=== Sam Neely ===
Sam Neely recorded the first charting version of "When You Leave That Way ..." in 1983 for the MCA Records label. His version peaked at No. 77 on the Hot Country Singles chart that year.

==== Chart performance ====
Chart performance for "When You Leave That Way You Can Never Go Back" by Sam Neely
Chart (1983)	Peak position
US Billboard Hot Country Singles	77

=== Bill Anderson version ===
"When You Leave That Way (You Can Never Go Back)"

Single by Bill Anderson

from the album Yesterday, Today and Tomorrow
- B-side: "Quits"
- Released: August 17, 1985
- Genre: Country
- Length: 3:45
- Label: Swanee #5018
- Songwriters: Steve Clark, Johnny MacRae
- Producer: Walter Haynes

Bill Anderson singles chronology
"Pity Party" (1985)	"When You Leave That Way (You Can Never Go Back)" (1985)	"Sheet Music" (1986)

Bill Anderson later recorded the song for his 1985 album Yesterday, Today, and Tomorrow. His version went to number 75 on the country music charts.

==== Chart performance ====
Chart performance for "When You Leave That Way (You Can Never Go Back)" by Bill Anderson
Chart (1985)	Peak position
US Billboard Hot Country Singles	75

=== Confederate Railroad version ===
"When You Leave That Way You Can Never Go Back"

Single by Confederate Railroad

from the album Confederate Railroad
- A-side: "Trashy Women"
- Released: April 10, 1993
- Genre: Country
- Length: 4:12
- Label: Atlantic
- Songwriters: Steve Clark, Johnny MacRae
- Producer: Barry Beckett

Confederate Railroad singles chronology
"Queen of Memphis" (1992)	"When You Leave That Way You Can Never Go Back" (1993)	"Trashy Women" (1993)

Music video
- "When You Leave That Way You Can Never Go Back" on YouTube

In 1992, Confederate Railroad recorded the song for its debut album, also titled Confederate Railroad. The song was released in 1993 as the fourth single from the album, reaching a peak of number 14 on the country music charts. It was also the b-side to the album's fifth single, "Trashy Women."

==== Critical reception ====
An uncredited review in The Miami Herald referred to the song positively, calling it a "soft, poignant song about burning bridges that can't be rebuilt."

==== Music video ====
The video was directed by Martin Kahan and it starts by seeing a man in coveralls attempt to chase a small child down a gravel road, then upon the sound of the prison cell door, the song begins with the man's flashback to the altercation with his father that got him to leave home, his meeting with the girl he stood up at the altar to him in prison, with his father reading about the execution in the local newspaper. The video concludes with the man in the coveralls (revealed to be his soul) returning to the farmhouse and seeing his son and father mourning. The video also cuts to the band performing the song in a room.

==== Chart performance ====
Chart performance for "When You Leave That Way You Can Never Go Back" by Confederate Railroad
Chart (1993)	Peak position
Canada Country Singles (RPM)	18
US Hot Country Songs (Billboard)	14
