= Time Marches On (song) =

Single by Tracy Lawrence

from the album Time Marches On
- Released: March 18, 1996
- Genre: Country
- Length: 3:03
- Label: Atlantic
- Songwriter: Bobby Braddock
- Producer: Don Cook

Tracy Lawrence singles chronology
"If You Loved Me" (1996)	"Time Marches On" (1996)	"Stars over Texas" (1996)

"Time Marches On" is a song written by Bobby Braddock, and recorded by American country music artist Tracy Lawrence. It was released in March 1996 as the second single and title track from his album Time Marches On. It was the 15th chart single of his career. It spent three weeks at Number One on the Billboard country charts in mid-1996, becoming the longest-lasting Number One hit of his career. It also received a Single of the Year nomination from the Country Music Association in 1996, as well as a Song of the Year nomination for both 1996 and 1997.

== Background ==
The song is in a moderate tempo in the key of A major with a vocal range of A3-F♯5. It features three verses, with a bridge preceding the third. The introduction and interludes follow a chord pattern of A-F♯m for four measures. Each verse uses that same chord pattern for four measures, followed by D-Bm for two measures, two more A-F♯m measures, ending on Bm-F♯m-Bm-A. The bridge uses D-Bm twice, A-F♯m twice, D-Bm twice again, and ends on E-Bm-D-E-A. After the third verse, Lawrence sings the line "Time marches on" several times over the chord pattern F♯m-Bm-A.

== Content ==
The song details various events in the lives of a married couple and their two children, starting with the children's young childhoods, then moving through their adolescences and adulthoods. In the bridge, the narrator observes that "the only thing that stays the same is that everything changes". By the final verse, the children have grown up and moved away, the daughter is now a grandparent, the son is on a diet to control his high cholesterol, the mother is senile (possibly Alzheimer's) and the father has died. Each verse also references various items of pop culture. The first verse references Hank Williams and his 1953 song "Kaw-Liga", as well as his 1951 song "Dear John" and the second verse references Bob Dylan and his 1965 hit, "Like a Rolling Stone" and the third verse makes another reference to Williams-"as the angels sing an old Hank Williams song."

== Critical reception ==
Deborah Evans Price, of Billboard magazine in her review of the album called the song a "quirky kind of 'Pilgrim's Progress' set in the saga of a white-trash family." Price also reviewed the song as an official single. She called it an "intriguing song that chronicles the life of a family in different stages; it uses vivid images that connect the listener to the lyric through the characters and cultural references." She goes on to say that "Lawrence's delivery and Cook's production are right on target..."

== Music video ==
The music video was directed by Marc Ball and premiered in March 1996. It shows Lawrence performing in front of an audience. It was released as part of Lawrence's Unplugged series, filmed in February 1996.

== Personnel ==
Compiled from the liner notes.

- Bruce Bouton – steel guitar
- Dennis Burnside – piano, Hammond organ
- Mark Casstevens – acoustic guitar
- Rob Hajacos – fiddle
- Brent Mason – electric guitar
- John Wesley Ryles – background vocals
- Dennis Wilson – background vocals
- Lonnie Wilson – drums, percussion
- Glenn Worf – bass guitar

== Chart positions ==
"Time Marches On" debuted at number 64 on the U.S. Billboard Hot Country Singles & Tracks for the week of March 23, 1996.

Chart (1996)	Peak position
Canada Country Singles (RPM)	1
US Hot Country Songs (Billboard)	1

=== Year-end charts ===
Chart (1996)	Position
Canada Country Tracks (RPM)	51
US Country Songs (Billboard)	3
