= Trashy Women =

Single by Confederate Railroad

from the album Confederate Railroad
- B-side: "When You Leave That Way You Can Never Go Back"
- Released: July 24, 1993
- Genre: Country rock
- Length: 3:14
- Label: Atlantic
- Songwriter: Chris Wall
- Producer: Barry Beckett

Confederate Railroad singles chronology
"When You Leave That Way You Can Never Go Back" (1993)	"Trashy Women" (1993)	"She Never Cried" (1994)

Music video
- "Trashy Women" on YouTube

"Trashy Women" is a song written by Chris Wall and recorded by American country music singer Jerry Jeff Walker in 1989 and later by the band Confederate Railroad. It reached number 63 on the US Country chart in 1989 for Walker, and was a number 10 country hit four years later from Confederate Railroad's self-titled debut album.

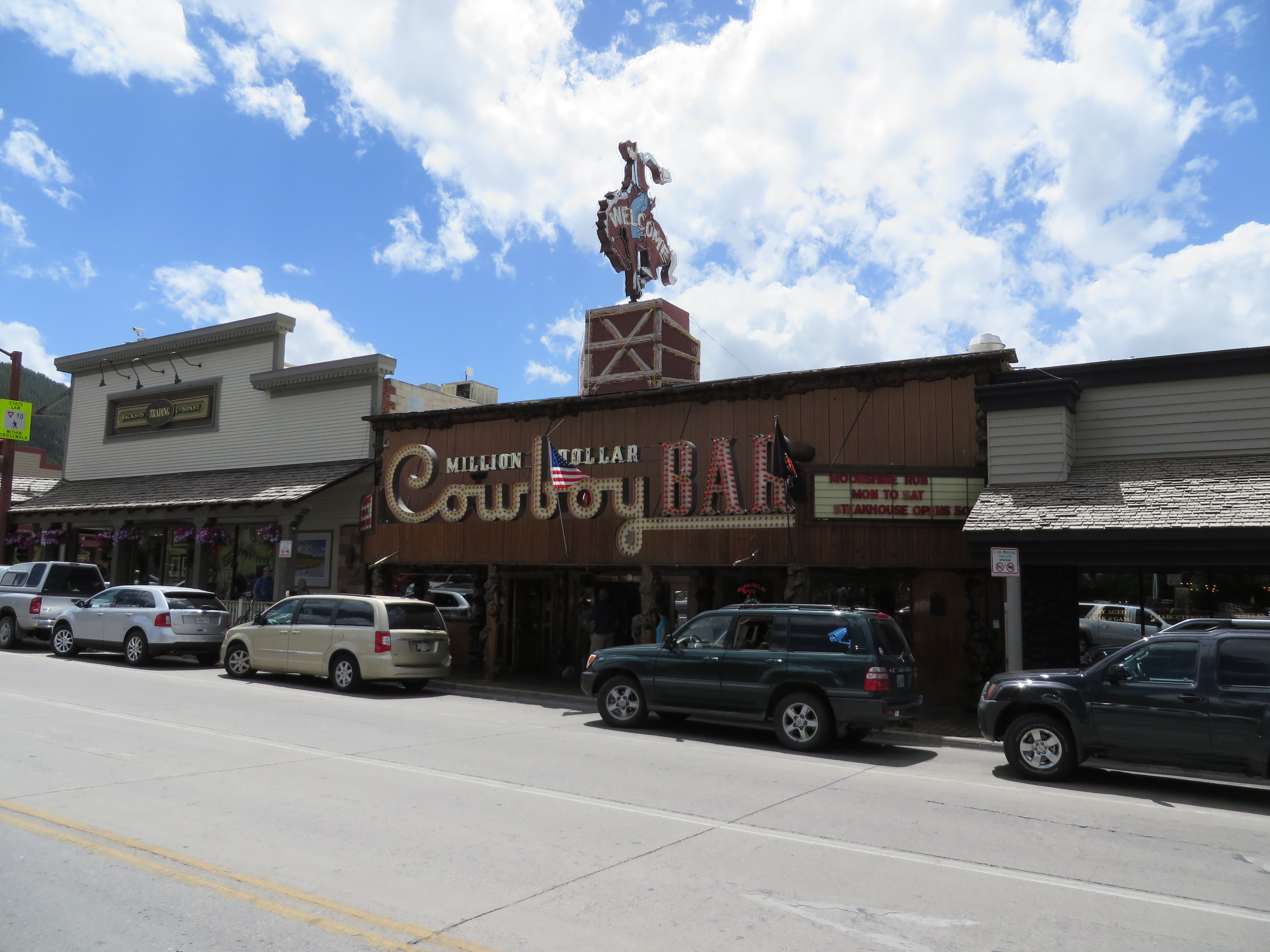
Million Dollar Cowboy Bar

According to legend, Walker was in the Million Dollar Cowboy Bar in Jackson, Wyoming one evening and heard either Wall (who was also a bartender at the bar) or Kip Attaway performing the song. He then asked whichever it was to come to his hotel room later to teach him the song.

== Content ==
The song's narrator describes that he "was raised in a sophisticated kind of style", but likes his women "just a tad on the trashy side," and shares various stories and explanations of why he does. One of these is a story about his parents being surprised at the fact that his prom date was a "cocktail waitress in a Dolly Parton wig".

== Music video ==
The music video was directed by Martin Kahan. It featured American country artists Stonewall Jackson and Jeannie Seely.

== Chart history ==
=== Jerry Jeff Walker ===
Chart (1989)	Peak position
US Hot Country Songs (Billboard)	63

=== Confederate Railroad ===
Chart (1993)	Peak position
Canada Country Singles (RPM)	12
US Bubbling Under Hot 100 (Billboard)	13
US Hot Country Songs (Billboard)	10
