= Jesus and Mama =

Single by Confederate Railroad

from the album Confederate Railroad
- A-side: "Queen of Memphis"
- Released: July 4, 1992
- Genre: Country
- Length: 3:24
- Label: Atlantic #87404
- Songwriter: Danny Mayo; James Dean Hicks
- Producer: Barry Beckett

Confederate Railroad singles chronology
| "She Took It Like a Man" (1992) | "Jesus and Mama" (1992) | "Queen of Memphis" (1992) |

"Jesus and Mama" is a song written by Danny Mayo and James Dean Hicks, and recorded by the American country music band Confederate Railroad. It was released in July 1992 as the second single from the band's self-titled debut album. The song peaked at number 4 on the Hot Country Singles & Tracks charts in and was later included as the b-side to the album's third single, "Queen of Memphis."

== Critical reception ==
It received a positive review in Billboard, with the uncredited review calling the song "soft and believable".

== Chart performance ==
| Chart (1992) | Peak position |
|---|---|
| Canada Country Singles (RPM) | 14 |
| US Hot Country Songs (Billboard) | 4 |

=== Year-end charts ===
| Chart (1992) | Position |
|---|---|
| US Country Songs (Billboard) | 72 |
