= Queen of Memphis =

Single by Confederate Railroad

from the album Confederate Railroad
- B-side: "Jesus and Mama"
- Released: December 1992
- Genre: Country rock
- Length: 3:20
- Label: Atlantic
- Songwriters: Dave Gibson, Kathy Louvin
- Producer: Barry Beckett

Confederate Railroad singles chronology
"Jesus and Mama" (1992)	"Queen of Memphis" (1992)	"When You Leave That Way You Can Never Go Back" (1993)

"Queen of Memphis" is a song written by Dave Gibson and Kathy Louvin, and recorded by American country music band Confederate Railroad. It was released in December 1992 as the third single from their album Confederate Railroad. It peaked at number 2 in the United States (behind "What Part of No" by Lorrie Morgan), and number 3 in Canada. It is the band's highest-peaking single.

== Music video ==
The music video was directed by John Ware and premiered in early 1993 and features former NFL coach Jerry Glanville.

== Chart positions ==
Chart (1992–1993)	Peak position
Canada Country Singles (RPM)	3
US Hot Country Songs (Billboard)	2

=== Year-end charts ===
Chart (1993)	Position
Canada Country Tracks (RPM)	50
US Country Songs (Billboard)	58
