= Gregg Champion =

American film director

- Born: November 20, 1956 (age 69); Los Angeles, California
- Occupation: Film director

Gregg Champion (born November 20, 1956, in Los Angeles, California) is an American film director, known for his work on wide release and TV Hollywood movies. His parents are Marge Champion and Gower Champion.
