= Confederate Railroad =

American Southern rock band

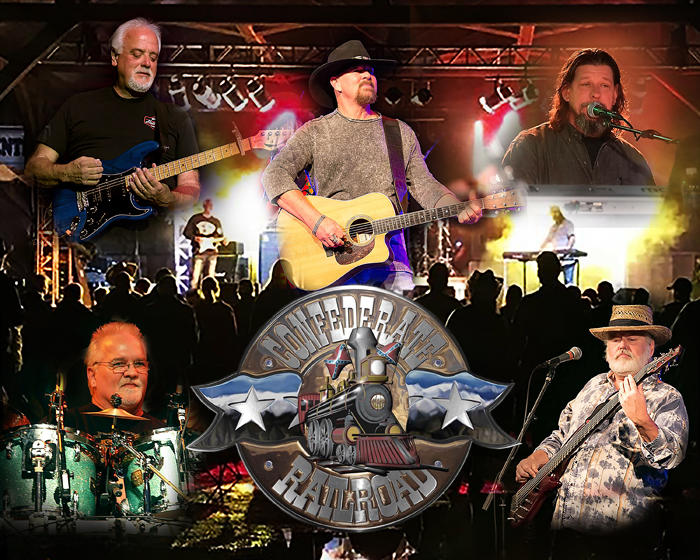
- Confederate Railroad in 2019.

Background information
- Also known as: Confederate RR
- Origin: Atlanta, Georgia, U.S.
- Genres: Country rock
- Years active: 1987–present
- Labels: Atlantic; Audium; Shanachie; E1 Music; D&B Masterworks
- Members: Danny Shirley; Rusty Hendrix; Mo Thaxton; BoBo Benefield
- Past members: Jimmy Dormire; Chris McDaniel; Michael Lamb; Warren "Gates" Nichols; Cody McCarver; Bobby Randall; Wayne Secrest; Joey Recker; Mark DuFresne
- Website: confederaterailroad.net

Confederate Railroad (originally known as "Confederate RR") is an American country rock band founded in 1987 in Marietta, Georgia, by Danny Shirley (lead vocals), Michael Lamb (lead guitar), Mark Dufresne (drums), Chris McDaniel (keyboards), Warren "Gates" Nichols (steel guitar), and Wayne Secrest (bass guitar). After serving as a backing band for outlaw country acts David Allan Coe and Johnny Paycheck, the band signed to a recording contract with Atlantic Records, releasing their self-titled debut album that year. The band's debut album is certified as double platinum and their second album (Notorious) has also had platinum level sales. They have also had 18 singles on the Billboard Hot Country Songs charts.

The band's most recent studio album, Lucky to Be Alive, was issued on the D&B Masterworks label on July 15, 2016. The band released their first live album, Confederate Railroad Live: Back to the Barrooms, on the E1 Music label on June 15, 2010.

== History ==
Confederate Railroad was founded in 1987 by Danny Shirley, Michael Lamb, Gates Nichols (May 26, 1944 – August 14, 2009), Chris McDaniel, Wayne Secrest (April 29, 1950 – June 2, 2018), and Mark Dufresne. The six members began playing at bars in and around Atlanta, Georgia, and Augusta, Georgia. Over time, they also worked as a road band for David Allan Coe and Johnny Paycheck. Shirley had previously been signed to the Amor record label as a solo singer, charting five times on the country charts between 1984 and 1988.

After several years in the Atlanta area, the band signed with Atlantic Records in 1992 and released its self-titled debut album. The album produced six hit singles and was certified 2× Platinum in the U.S. In 1993, Confederate Railroad was awarded Best New Group at the ACM awards. In order of release, these singles were "She Took It Like a Man," "Jesus and Mama," "Queen of Memphis," (their highest chart peak, at no. 2) "When You Leave That Way You Can Never Go Back," "Trashy Women," and "She Never Cried."

Notorious was the band's second album. Released in 1994, it was certified platinum as well. The album was led off by the no. 9 "Daddy Never Was the Cadillac Kind," followed by the no. 20 "Elvis and Andy," and finally "Summer in Dixie," which failed to make Top 40. Also in 1994, Shirley and Mark Collie co-wrote and sang guest vocals on Billy Ray Cyrus's "Redneck Heaven," an album cut from his 1994 disc Storm in the Heartland.

One year later, the band released its third album, 1995's When and Where. This album failed to sell as well as its predecessors, and was less successful on the charts as well. Lead-off single "When and Where" reached No. 24, while the other three singles – "Bill's Laundromat, Bar and Grill," "When He Was My Age," and "See Ya" all failed to reach Top 40. A Greatest Hits package followed in 1996.

In 1998, the band released its fourth and final studio album for Atlantic, titled Keep on Rockin'. Its only two singles were "The Big One" and "Cowboy Cadillac," both of which failed to reach the Top 60 on the country singles charts. After another compilation titled Rockin' Country Party Pack (which produced another chart single in "Toss a Little Bone," previously from When and Where), the band exited Atlantic.

One year later, Confederate Railroad signed to Audium/Koch Records (now E1 Music) for its fifth studio album, Unleashed. It was led off by the no. 39 "What Brothers Do." Although this was the band's first Top 40 country hit since "When and Where" in 1995, the other singles – "She Treats Her Body Like a Temple" and "White Trash with Money" – both failed to reach Top 40.

The band did not record again until 2007's Cheap Thrills, an album of cover songs. This album was led off by a cover of "Please Come to Boston," which failed to chart.

Confederate Railroad signed a record deal with E1 Music in 2010 and released their first-ever live album called "Confederate Railroad Live: Back to the Barrooms." Since 2019, the band has missed bookings and had concerts cancelled because of concerns over the band's name and their logo's inclusion of two Confederate flags. In cancelling their planned performance at the Ulster County Fair, organizers said the event must represent "the values of all members of our community" and that "showcasing of a symbol of division and racism runs counter to that principle."

The Confederate flag is a racist symbol, representing a war to continue slavery and racial segregation in the United States. The band said the cancellation was "very disappointing". Shirley says the flag represents history and Southern heritage.

Shirley blamed Governor J. B. Pritzker's cancellation of the band from the DuQuoin State Fair lineup on political correctness, which he says is focused on the band's name. The governor's office said that state resources could not be used "to promote symbols of racism," specifying the Confederate flag in the group's logo.

Shirley suffered a broken back on April 1, 2021.

In 2022, the band toured the US as a 4-piece band with Shirley on lead vocals and guitar, Rusty Hendrix on lead guitar, Mo Thaxton on bass and occasional lead vocals, and Mark DuFresne on drums.

== Musical stylings ==
Described vocally as a "gruff, reliable twanger," lead singer Danny Shirley cites outlaw country acts such as Waylon Jennings as major influences. According to him, the band's music is "straight-ahead outlaw country," although their image has also drawn comparisons to Southern rock.

Confederate Railroad's novelty numbers, such as "Trashy Women," show a tongue-in-cheek sense of humor. A reviewer for New Country magazine wrote that they are "one of the few bands who can pull off a song about how they prefer trashy women and sound like they really mean it." A more serious side of the band is shown in their ballads. Those on Notorious, for instance, were described by New Country magazine as "show[ing] men left stunned and confused by a world that changed faster than they could follow."

== Member changes ==
Lead guitarist Michael Lamb, one of the group's original members, left in the mid 1990s and was replaced with Jimmy Dormire.

Chris McDaniel, the original keyboardist, left and was replaced with Cody McCarver. McCarver has released a solo album, although he continued to tour as a member of Confederate Railroad until his last performance with them at the Putnam County Fair in Eleanor, West Virginia, on July 16, 2010. To date, McCarver has released 2 country music albums and 4 gospel albums. He has also worked on some independent films and his most recent work was with John Schneider working on his album and being a costar in his movie "Stand on It" as well as the sequel "Poker Run." He is currently on the road touring with John Schneider in his band where he also opens the show with his own music.

In June 2008, Jimmy Dormire announced that he was leaving Confederate Railroad to continue his solo career, though he continues as a member of Cody McCarver's band. Dormire was subsequently replaced by Rusty Hendrix, former side man for Mark Wills and Sammy Kershaw. Dormire was part of the Cody McCarver band, and became a regular in the John Schneider band before joining to BlackHawk and the Outlaws.

Gates Nichols retired from Confederate Railroad in December 2008, and in July of the following year, he was diagnosed with pancreatic cancer. He died from the disease on August 14, 2009, at the age of 65. In January 2011, Bobby Randall joined Confederate Railroad, playing steel guitar and fiddle for 6 years until his departure in 2017.

In October 2014, Mo Thaxton joined the group on the baritone, bass and vocals. Thaxton was a member of the group Dr. Hook for 12 years prior to joining Confederate Railroad.

Joey Recker began playing piano with the group in January 2017 after 28 years in the armed forces. He departed the band in December 2021 to be closer to his family and focus on his faith. He fronts the Joey & Shug Duo that does local music and a Southern Gospel band called Antioch-Southern Gospel.

Bassist Wayne Secrest retired from the band in October 2017. He died on June 2, 2018, after a long illness, at the age of 68.

== Solo work ==
In addition to his work in the band, frontman Danny Shirley made a guest appearance alongside Mark Collie on the song "Redneck Heaven" from Billy Ray Cyrus' 1994 album Storm in the Heartland, a song which Collie and Shirley co-wrote. Danny Shirley released 3 albums prior to the formation of Confederate Railroad. His first, "Local Legend," was released in 1984 on Amor Records. His second, "Far From Over," and third "I Make the Living" albums were released in 1990 also on Amor. Danny released a 2 CD album featuring several of the songs from those 3 albums called "The Pyramid Collection" in 2005.

Cody McCarver released a self-titled solo album for the Aspirion label in 2006, which produced the singles "Red Flag" and "Through God's Eyes." He released another single, "Look What You've Done," in 2009. His 2010 single "White Trash With Money" was written by fellow band member Shirley along with songwriter Buck Moore. "White Trash With Money" was followed by "I'm America." Since recording two country albums, Cody went on to release four gospel albums and is currently acting in films along with John Schneider and playing in Schneider's band.

In 2022, Bassist Mo Thaxton recorded a Bluegrass album "The Mo Show" that was released in 2023. He recorded 2 Railroad songs "Don't feel as young as I used to" & "Between the rainbows and the rain". This CD is only available at their shows and sold exclusively by Mo himself.

== Discography ==
=== Studio albums ===
Title	Album details	Peak chart positions				Certifications (sales thresholds)
Title	Album details	US Country	US	US Heat	CAN Country	Certifications (sales thresholds)
Confederate Railroad	Release date: April 28, 1992; Label: Atlantic Nashville	7	53	3	19	US: 2× Platinum
Notorious	Release date: March 22, 1994; Label: Atlantic Nashville	6	52	—	13	US: Platinum
When and Where	Release date: June 13, 1995; Label: Atlantic Nashville	21	152	—	—	
Keep on Rockin'	Release date: October 20, 1998; Label: Atlantic Nashville	57	—	—	—	
Unleashed	Release date: August 28, 2001; Label: Audium/Koch	63	—	—	—	
Cheap Thrills	Release date: April 24, 2007; Label: Shanachie	—	—	—	—	
Lucky to Be Alive	Release date: July 15, 2016; Label: D&B Masterworks	49	—	—	—	
"—" denotes releases that did not chart

=== Compilation and live albums ===
Title	Album details	Peak positions
Title	Album details	US Country
Greatest Hits	Release date: June 18, 1996; Label: Atlantic Nashville	60
Rockin' Country Party Pack	Release date: August 22, 2000; Label: Atlantic Nashville	63
Country Classics	Release date: 2001; Label: Rhino	—
The Essentials	Release date: June 4, 2002; Label: Atlantic	—
The Very Best of Confederate Railroad	Release date: May 6, 2008; Label: Rhino	—
Live: Back to the Barroom	Release date: June 15, 2010; Label: E1 Music	—
"—" denotes releases that did not chart

=== Singles ===
Year	Single	Peak chart positions			Album
Year	Single	US Country	US Bubbling	CAN Country	Album
1992	"She Took It Like a Man"	37	—	41	Confederate Railroad
1992	"Jesus and Mama"	4	—	14	Confederate Railroad
1992	"Queen of Memphis"	2	—	3	Confederate Railroad
1993	"When You Leave That Way You Can Never Go Back"	14	—	18	Confederate Railroad
1993	"Trashy Women"	10	13	12	Confederate Railroad
1993	"She Never Cried"	27	—	28	Confederate Railroad
1994	"Daddy Never Was the Cadillac Kind"	9	—	7	Notorious
1994	"Elvis and Andy"	20	—	8	Notorious
1994	"Summer in Dixie"	55	—	—	Notorious
1995	"When and Where"	24	—	17	When and Where
1995	"Bill's Laundromat, Bar and Grill"	54	—	58	When and Where
1995	"When He Was My Age"	66	—	90	When and Where
1996	"See Ya"	51	—	—	When and Where
1996	"The One You Love the Most"	—	—	—	Greatest Hits
1998	"The Big One"	66	—	—	Keep on Rockin'
1999	"Cowboy Cadillac"	70	—	—	Keep on Rockin'
2000	"Toss a Little Bone"	71	—	—	Rockin' Country Party Pack
2001	"That's What Brothers Do"	39	—	—	Unleashed
2002	"She Treats Her Body Like a Temple" (duet with George Jones)	59	—	—	Unleashed
2002	"White Trash with Money"	—	—	—	Unleashed
2007	"Please Come to Boston"	—	—	—	Cheap Thrills
2016	"Trashy Women (20th Anniversary)" (featuring John Anderson, Colt Ford and Willie Nelson)	—	—	—	Lucky to Be Alive
2021	"Don't Ride Faster Than Your Angel Can Fly"	—	—	—	Non-album single
"—" denotes releases that did not chart

=== Music videos ===
Year	Video	Director
1992	"She Took it Like a Man"	Deaton-Flanigen Productions
1992	"She Never Cried"	Deaton-Flanigen Productions
1993	"Queen of Memphis"	John Ware
1993	"When You Leave That Way You Can Never Go Back"	Martin Kahan
1993	"Trashy Women"	Martin Kahan
1994	"Daddy Never Was the Cadillac Kind"	Martin Kahan
1994	"Summer in Dixie"	Martin Kahan
1994	"Elvis & Andy"	Martin Kahan
1995	"When and Where"	Martin Kahan
1995	"Bill's Laundromat, Bar & Grill"	Martin Kahan
1998	"Keep on Rockin'"	Martin Kahan
2001	"That's What Brothers Do"	Stephen Shepherd
2018	"Good Ole Boys (with Various Artists)"	John Schneider

== Awards and nominations ==
=== Grammy Awards ===
Year	Nominee / work	Award	Result
1994	Best Country Performance by a Duo or Group with Vocal	"Trashy Women"	Nominated

=== TNN/Music City News Country Awards ===
Year	Nominee / work	Award	Result
1995	Confederate Railroad	Vocal Band of the Year	Nominated

=== Academy of Country Music Awards ===
Year	Nominee / work	Award	Result
1993	Confederate Railroad	Top New Vocal Group or Duet	Won
1994	Confederate Railroad	Top Vocal Group of the Year	Nominated

=== Country Music Association Awards ===
Year	Nominee / work	Award	Result
1993	Confederate Railroad	Vocal Group of the Year	Nominated
1994	Confederate Railroad	Vocal Group of the Year	Nominated
