= Brett Jones (songwriter) =

American songwriter (1956-2026)

- Born: William Seaborn Jones; March 13, 1956; Annapolis, Maryland, U.S.
- Origin: Nashville, Tennessee, U.S.
- Died: February 16, 2026 (aged 69) Franklin, Tennessee, U.S.
- Genre: Country
- Occupation: Songwriter
- Years active: 1995–2025

William Seaborn "Brett" Jones (March 13, 1956 – February 16, 2026) was an American singer, songwriter, and music publisher from Warm Springs, Georgia, United States. A prolific country music writer, his songs were recorded by artists such as Lee Ann Womack, Billy Currington, and Jason Aldean.

Jones signed a publishing deal with a company owned by country music singer Ronnie Milsap. His first top twenty hit came in 1995 with Confederate Railroad's "When and Where." He owned Crazytown Productions/Big Borassa Music, in which he watched over many of his own catalogs such as Big Borassa Music, Jonesbone Music, and Brett Jones Music. As of 2012, his catalogs and himself as an artist were signed to ole, a rights management company. Jones, as an artist, also released his own CD called Life's Road in 2009 and followed with Cowboy Sailor in July 2014.

== Singles ==
Singles that Jones had co-written include:

Year	Single title	Recording artist	Co-writer	Chart Positions
Year	Single title	Recording artist	Co-writer	Billboard Country
1995	"When and Where"	Confederate Railroad	Jess Brown, Jeff Pennig	24
1996	"Workin' It Out"	Daryle Singletary	Tim Johnson	50
1996	"You Gotta Love That"	Neal McCoy	Jess Brown	3
1997	"Better Man, Better Off"	Tracy Lawrence	Stan Paul Davis	2
1997	"The Coast Is Clear"	Tracy Lawrence	Jess Brown	26
1998	"Cover You in Kisses"	John Michael Montgomery	Jerry Kilgore, Jess Brown	3
1998	"A Little Past Little Rock"	Lee Ann Womack	Jess Brown, Tony Lane	2
1999	"You Won't Ever Be Lonely"	Andy Griggs	Andy Griggs	2
2002	"Practice Life"	Andy Griggs with Martina McBride	Andy Griggs	33
2003	"Good Little Girls"	Blue County	Troy Seals	11
2005	"Don't Ask Me How I Know"	Bobby Pinson	Bobby Pinson, Bart Butler	16
2006	"If I Don't Make It Back"	Tracy Lawrence	Bobby Pinson	42
2007	"Living in the Here and Now"	Darryl Worley	Darryl Worley	54
2007	"What Do Ya Think About That"	Montgomery Gentry	Anthony Smith	3
2009	"That's How Country Boys Roll"	Billy Currington	Billy Currington, Dallas Davidson	1
2010	"Crazy Town"	Jason Aldean	Rodney Clawson	2
2011	"If Heaven Wasn't So Far Away"	Justin Moore	Dallas Davidson, Rob Hatch	1
