= Dave Gibson (American songwriter) =

American country music songwriter (born 1946)

- Born: David Lowell Gibson; October 1, 1946 (age 79); El Dorado, Arkansas
- Genres: Country
- Occupation: Songwriter
- Instruments: Vocals, guitar
- Years active: late 1980s-present
- Label: Epic (in Gibson/Miller Band)
- Formerly of: Gibson/Miller Band
- Spouse: Daisy Dern

David Lowell Gibson (born October 1, 1946) is an American country music songwriter. Gibson has written songs for Alabama, Tanya Tucker, and others.

Gibson was born in El Dorado, Arkansas and raised in Odessa, Texas before moving to Nashville, Tennessee in 1982.

He held a publishing contract with a company owned by The Oak Ridge Boys. Between 1990 and 1994, Gibson was the frontman of the Gibson/Miller Band. Gibson was married to singer-songwriter Daisy Dern.

== Discography ==
=== Albums ===
Year	Album	Label
2011	Dave Gibson & Friends, Volume 1	Resnik Music Group
2011	Dave Gibson Volume 2	Resnik Music Group
2011	Dave Gibson & Friends Volume 3	Resnik Music Group
2011	Dave Gibson & Friends Volume 4 (with Daisy Dern)	Resnik Music Group
2011	Dave Gibson & Friends Volume 5 - After Hours	Resnik Music Group
2011	Dave Gibson & Friends Volume 6	Resnik Music Group
2011	Dave Gibson & Friends Volume 7	Resnik Music Group
2011	Dave Gibson & Friends Volume 8	Resnik Music Group
2011	Dave Gibson & Friends Volume 9	Resnik Music Group
2011	Dave Gibson & Friends Volume 10	Resnik Music Group
2011	Dave Gibson & Friends Volume 11	Resnik Music Group
2017	Good & Gettin' Better	Right Recordings
TBA	Hardware Store	TBA

== List of songs written by Dave Gibson ==
Gibson wrote or co-wrote the following songs:

- Alabama: "Jukebox in My Mind"
- Larry Boone: "Don't Give Candy to a Stranger"
- Confederate Railroad: "Queen of Memphis", "Daddy Never Was the Cadillac Kind"
- Joe Diffie: "Ships That Don't Come In"
- Gibson/Miller Band: "High Rollin'", "Texas Tattoo", "Red, White, and Blue Collar", "Stone Cold Country"
- James House: "That'll Be the Last Thing"
- Montgomery Gentry: "Lonely and Gone"
- Southern Pacific: "Honey I Dare You", "All Is Lost"
- Pam Tillis: "Do You Know Where Your Man Is"
- Tanya Tucker: "If It Don't Come Easy"
- Conway Twitty: "House on Old Lonesome Road"
- Steve Wariner: "Midnight Fire", "Don't You Give Up on Love", "Heart Trouble"
- Reba McEntire: "Congratulations" Co-wrote with Patti Stephens 1987
