= Danny Shirley =

American country music singer (born 1956)

- Born: August 12, 1956 (age 69); Chattanooga, Tennessee, U.S.
- Origin: Nashville, Tennessee
- Genres: Country
- Occupations: Singer; songwriter
- Instruments: Vocals; guitar
- Years active: 1984–present
- Label: Amor
- Member of: Confederate Railroad

Danny Shirley (born August 12, 1956) is an American country music singer and songwriter. He is best known as the lead singer of the country rock band Confederate Railroad, a role he has held since its formation in 1987.

Before the band was founded, Shirley recorded for Amor Records and charted five singles of his own.

In 1994, Shirley co-wrote and sang guest vocals (along with Mark Collie) on "Redneck Heaven", a track from Billy Ray Cyrus's Storm in the Heartland album.

Shirley is a 1974 graduate of Hixson High School in the Chattanooga suburb of Hixson.

== Discography ==
Title	Album details
Local Legend	Release date: 1984; Label: Amor Records
I Make the Living	Release date: 1990; Label: Amor Records
Far From Over	Release date: 1990; Label: Amor Records
The Pyramid Collection	Release date: 2005; Label: Danny Shirley

== Singles ==
Year	Single	Peak chart positions
Year	Single	US Country
1982	"Jack Daniels Haze"	—
1984	"Time Off for Bad Behavior"	—
1984	"Love and Let Love"	72
1984	"Christmas Needs Love to Be Christmas" (featuring the Lookout Mountain Presbyterian Church Youth Choir)	—
1985	"Yo Yo (The Right String, but the Wrong Yo-Yo)" (with Piano Red)	93
1985	"The Ballad of Whitwell Mine"	—
1985	"One for the Gipper"	—
1987	"Deep Down (Everybody Wants to Be from Dixie)"	82
1987	"Going to California"	81
1988	"I Make the Living (She Makes the Living Worthwhile)"	76
