= Larry Boone =

American singer-songwriter

- Born: Larry Eugene Boone; June 7, 1956 (age 69)
- Origin: Cooper City, Florida, U.S.
- Genres: Country
- Occupation: Singer-songwriter
- Instrument: Vocals
- Years active: 1985–2006
- Labels: Mercury; Columbia

Larry Eugene Boone (born June 7, 1956) is an American country music artist and songwriter. Between 1985 and 1993, Boone recorded five major label studio albums, in addition to charting several singles on the Billboard Hot Country Singles charts. His highest-charting single, "Don't Give Candy to a Stranger", reached No. 10 in 1988. Boone has also co-written several singles for other country music artists, including a Number One single for Kathy Mattea, and Top Ten hits for Don Williams, Tracy Lawrence, Rick Trevino and Lonestar.

== Musical career ==
Larry Eugene Boone was born in Cooper City, Florida, on June 7, 1956. He is a distant relative Daniel Boone, the famed frontiersman. He attended Florida Atlantic University and moved to Nashville in 1981.

His first cut as a songwriter was Marie Osmond's 1985 single "Until I Fall in Love Again". Boone was signed to a recording contract with Mercury Records in 1986. Boone's debut single "Stranger Things Have Happened" was released that year, reaching a peak of No. 64 on the Billboard Hot Country Singles charts. It was the first of seven singles from his self-titled debut album, released in 1987. The album's last single, 1988's "Don't Give Candy to a Stranger", was Boone's highest-charting single, peaking at No. 10.

1988 saw the release of Boone's second album, Swingin' Doors, Sawdust Floors, which produced Top 20 hits in "I Just Called to Say Goodbye Again" and "Wine Me Up". Meanwhile, he continued to write songs for other artists, including "Burnin' Old Memories", a Number One single for Kathy Mattea in 1989.

Boone's third and final album for Mercury, 1990's Down That River Road, produced only one single before he was dropped from Mercury's roster. In 1991, Boone signed to Columbia Records. His first album for the label, 1991's One Way to Go, was released that year, followed by Get in Line two years later. Both albums produced minor hit singles before he left Columbia as well. Boone continued to compose songs for other artists throughout the 1990s and into the 2000s, including singles for Shenandoah, George Strait, Lonestar, Rick Trevino, Tracy Lawrence and Doug Stone.

== Discography ==
=== Albums ===
Title	Album details	Peak chart positions
Title	Album details	US Country
Larry Boone	Release date: 1987; Label: Mercury Records; Format: CD, cassette	54
Swingin' Doors, Sawdust Floors	Release date: 1988; Label: Mercury Records; Format: CD, cassette	47
Down That River Road	Release date: 1990; Label: Mercury Records; Format: CD, cassette	63
One Way to Go	Release date: 1991; Label: Columbia Records; Format: CD, cassette	—
Get in Line	Release date: 1993; Label: Columbia Records; Format: CD, cassette	—

=== Singles ===
Year	Title	Peak positions		Album
Year	Title	US Country	CAN Country	Album
1986	"Stranger Things Have Happened"	64	—	Larry Boone
1986	"She's the Trip That I've Been On"	52	—	singles only
1987	"Back in the Swing of Things Again"	48	—	singles only
1987	"I Talked a Lot About Leaving"	52	—	Larry Boone
1987	"Roses in December"	44	—	Larry Boone
1988	"Stop Me (If You Heard This One Before)"	48	—	Larry Boone
1988	"Don't Give Candy to a Stranger"	10	—	Larry Boone
1988	"I Just Called to Say Goodbye Again"	16	37	Swingin' Doors, Sawdust Floors
1989	"Wine Me Up"	19	36	Swingin' Doors, Sawdust Floors
1989	"Fool's Paradise"	39	49	Swingin' Doors, Sawdust Floors
1990	"Everybody Wants to Be Hank Williams"	75	80	Down That River Road
1990	"Too Blue to Be True"	—^{A}	—	Down That River Road
1991	"I Need a Miracle"	57	65	One Way to Go
1991	"To Be with You"	34	51	One Way to Go
1991	"It Wouldn't Kill Me"	—	—	One Way to Go
1993	"Get in Line"	65	79	Get in Line
1993	"Hotel Coupe de Ville"	—	—	Get in Line
"—" denotes releases that did not chart

Notes:

- ^{A} "Too Blue to Be True" did not chart on Hot Country Songs, but peaked at No. 8 on Hot Country Radio Breakouts.

=== Music videos ===
Year	Video	Director
1987	"I Talked a Lot About Leaving"	
1989	"Fool's Paradise"	Sherman Halsey
1990	"Everybody Wants to Be Hank Williams"	Michael Salomon
1991	"I Need a Miracle"	Deaton-Flanigen
1993	"Get in Line"	
