= Tracy Byrd discography =

- Studio albums: 10
- Compilation albums: 6
- Singles: 34
- Music videos: 22
- No.1 Single: 3

Tracy Byrd is an American country music artist. His discography comprises 10 studio albums, six compilation albums and 34 singles. Of his albums, three are certified gold by the RIAA (1993's Tracy Byrd, 1995's Love Lessons, 1996's Big Love and 1999's Keepers: Greatest Hits), with his highest-certified album being the double-platinum No Ordinary Man from 1994. Of his singles, two have topped the Billboard country singles charts: "Holdin' Heaven" in 1993 and "Ten Rounds with Jose Cuervo" in 2002. One of Byrd's songs topped the Canadian RPM Country tracks, "I'm from the Country" in 1998.

== Studio albums ==
=== 1990s ===
Title	Details	Peak chart positions				Certifications (sales threshold)
Title	Details	US Country	US	CAN Country	CAN	Certifications (sales threshold)
Tracy Byrd	Release date: April 27, 1993; Label: MCA Records; Formats: CD, cassette	24	115	—	—	US: Gold
No Ordinary Man	Release date: June 7, 1994; Label: MCA Records; Formats: CD, cassette	3	20	11	—	US: 2× Platinum
Love Lessons	Release date: July 18, 1995; Label: MCA Records; Formats: CD, cassette	6	44	15	—	US: Gold
Big Love	Release date: October 22, 1996; Label: MCA Records; Formats: CD, cassette	12	106	18	—	US: Gold
I'm from the Country	Release date: May 12, 1998; Label: MCA Nashville; Formats: CD, cassette	8	58	9	87	
It's About Time	Release date: November 2, 1999; Label: RCA Nashville; Formats: CD, cassette	20	174	—	—	
"—" denotes releases that did not chart

=== 2000s–2010s ===
Title	Details	Peak chart positions		
Title	Details	US Country	US	US Indie
Ten Rounds	Release date: July 24, 2001; Label: RCA Nashville; Formats: CD, cassette	12	119	—
The Truth About Men	Release date: July 1, 2003; Label: RCA Nashville; Formats: CD, cassette	5	33	—
Different Things	Release date: September 26, 2006; Label: Blind Mule/New Revolution; Formats: CD, music download	36	165	15
All American Texan	Release date: October 10, 2016; Label: Self-released; Formats: CD, music download	—	—	—
"—" denotes releases that did not chart

== Compilation albums ==
Title	Details	Peak chart positions		Certifications (sales threshold)
Title	Details	US Country	US	Certifications (sales threshold)
Keepers: Greatest Hits	Release date: February 23, 1999; Label: MCA Nashville; Formats: CD, cassette	5	70	US: Gold
Tracy Byrd's Wonders of Wildlife (Note: Tracy Byrd's Wonders of Wildlife was a multi-artist compilation released under Byrd's name, featuring a variety of previously released tracks from other artists in order to sponsor wildlife preservation efforts.)	Release date: May 16, 2000; Label: RCA Records; Formats: CD, cassette	—	—	
The Millennium Collection: The Best of Tracy Byrd	Release date: November 20, 2001; Label: MCA Nashville; Formats: CD, cassette	—	—	
Greatest Hits	Release date: February 8, 2005; Label: BNA Records; Formats: CD, music download	14	61	
The Definitive Collection	Release date: March 13, 2007; Label: MCA Nashville; Formats: CD, music download	—	—	
Icon	Release date: March 6, 2012; Label: MCA Nashville; Formats: CD, music download	—	—	
"—" denotes releases that did not chart

== Singles ==
=== As lead artist ===
Year	Single	Peak chart positions			Album
Year	Single	US Country	US	CAN Country	Album
1992	"That's the Thing About a Memory"	71	—	64	Tracy Byrd
1993	"Someone to Give My Love To"	42	—	52	Tracy Byrd
1993	"Holdin' Heaven"	1	—	3	Tracy Byrd
1993	"Why Don't That Telephone Ring"	39	—	30	Tracy Byrd
1994	"Lifestyles of the Not So Rich and Famous"	4	— (Note: "Lifestyles of the Not So Rich and Famous" did not enter the Hot 100, but peaked at number 15 on Bubbling Under Hot 100 Singles, which acts as a 25-song extension of the Hot 100.)	4	No Ordinary Man
1994	"Watermelon Crawl"	4	81	8	No Ordinary Man
1994	"The First Step"	5	—	4	No Ordinary Man
1995	"The Keeper of the Stars"	2	68	5	No Ordinary Man
1995	"Walking to Jerusalem"	15	92	11	Love Lessons
1995	"Love Lessons"	9	— (Note: "Love Lessons" did not enter the Hot 100, but peaked at number 19 on Bubbling Under Hot 100 Singles, which acts as a 25-song extension of the Hot 100.)	13	Love Lessons
1996	"Heaven in My Woman's Eyes"	14	—	34	Love Lessons
1996	"4 to 1 in Atlanta"	21	—	18	Love Lessons
1996	"Big Love"	3	—	5	Big Love
1997	"Don't Take Her She's All I Got"	4	—	4	Big Love
1997	"Don't Love Make a Diamond Shine"	17	—	13	Big Love
1997	"Good Ol' Fashioned Love"	47	—	29	Big Love
1998	"I'm from the Country"	3	63	1	I'm from the Country
1998	"I Wanna Feel That Way Again"	9	—	28	I'm from the Country
1998	"When Mama Ain't Happy"	31	—	24	Keepers: Greatest Hits
1999	"Put Your Hand in Mine"	11	76	25	It's About Time
1999	"Merry Christmas from Texas Y'all"	55	—	—	Non-album single
2000	"Love, You Ain't Seen the Last of Me"	44	—	63	It's About Time
2000	"Take Me with You When You Go"	43	—	76	It's About Time
2001	"A Good Way to Get on My Bad Side" (with Mark Chesnutt)	21	— (Note: "A Good Way to Get on My Bad Side" did not enter the Hot 100, but peaked at number 21 on Bubbling Under Hot 100 Singles, which acts as a 25-song extension of the Hot 100.)	×	Ten Rounds
2001	"Just Let Me Be in Love"	9	64	×	Ten Rounds
2002	"Ten Rounds with Jose Cuervo"	1	26	×	Ten Rounds
2002	"Lately (Been Dreamin' 'Bout Babies)"	38	—	×	Non-album single
2003	"The Truth About Men" (featuring Blake Shelton, Andy Griggs, and Montgomery Gentry; uncredited)	13	77	×	The Truth About Men
2003	"Drinkin' Bone"	7	60	×	The Truth About Men
2004	"How'd I Wind Up in Jamaica"	53	—	—	The Truth About Men
2004	"Revenge of a Middle-Aged Woman"	34	—	—	Greatest Hits
2005	"Tiny Town"	—	—	—	Greatest Hits
2006	"Cheapest Motel"	55	—	—	Different Things
2007	"Better Places Than This"	—	—	—	Different Things
"—" denotes releases that did not chart "×" indicates that no relevant chart existed or was archived

=== As featured artist ===
Year	Single	Peak positions	Album
Year	Single	US Country	Album
2000	"Now That's Awesome" (Bill Engvall with T. Graham Brown, Tracy Byrd and Neal McCoy)	59	Now That's Awesome

== Music videos ==
Year	Title	Director
1992	"That's the Thing About a Memory"	Marc Ball
1992	"Someone to Give My Love To"	Gerry Wenner
1993	"Holdin' Heaven"	Gerry Wenner
1993	"Why Don't That Telephone Ring"	Michael Merriman
1994	"Lifestyles of the Not So Rich and Famous"	Michael Merriman
1994	"Watermelon Crawl"	Michael Merriman
1995	"The Keeper of the Stars"	Michael Merriman
1995	"You Lied to Me"	Michael Merriman
1995	"Walking to Jerusalem"	Michael Merriman
1995	"Love Lessons"	Deaton Flanigen
1996	"Big Love"	Gerry Wenner
1997	"Don't Take Her She's All I Got"	Gerry Wenner
1997	"Good Ol' Fashioned Love"	Gerry Wenner
1998	"I'm from the Country"	Michael Merriman
1998	"I Wanna Feel That Way Again"	Martin Kahan
2000	"It's About Time"	
2000	"Love, You Ain't Seen the Last of Me"	
2001	"Just Let Me Be in Love"	Deaton Flanigen
2003	"The Truth About Men" (w/ Blake Shelton, Montgomery Gentry & Andy Griggs)	Thom Oliphant
2005	"Revenge of a Middle-Aged Woman"	Eric Welch
2007	"A Cowboy and a Dancer"	
2007	"Saltwater Cowboy"	
