= Keepers: Greatest Hits =

Greatest hits album by Tracy Byrd
- Released: February 23, 1999
- Recorded: 1992–1998
- Genre: Country
- Length: 37:26
- Label: MCA Nashville
- Producer: various

Tracy Byrd chronology
| I'm from the Country (1998) | Keepers: Greatest Hits (1999) | It's About Time (1999) |

Singles from Keepers: Greatest Hits
- 1. "When Mama Ain't Happy" Released: December 19, 1998

Professional ratings
Review scores
| Source | Rating |
|---|---|
| Allmusic | 4/5 stars |

Keepers: Greatest Hits is the first compilation album by American country music artist Tracy Byrd. It was released in February 1999 as his last album for MCA, and it contains the previously unreleased track "When Mama Ain't Happy", which was issued as a single.

This compilation also features the radio edit of "The Keeper of the Stars", recorded a semitone lower than Byrd's original recording from his 1994 album No Ordinary Man.

== Track listing ==
| No. | Title | Writer(s) | Length |
|---|---|---|---|
| 1. | "When Mama Ain't Happy" | Rick Giles, Tim Nichols, Gilles Godard | 3:24 |
| 2. | "Someone to Give My Love To" | Bill Rice, Jerry Foster | 3:23 |
| 3. | "Holdin' Heaven" | Bill Kenner, Thom McHugh | 2:32 |
| 4. | "Lifestyles of the Not So Rich and Famous" | Byron Hill, Wayne Tester | 2:51 |
| 5. | "Watermelon Crawl" | Zack Turner, Buddy Brock | 3:01 |
| 6. | "The Keeper of the Stars" | Karen Staley, Dickey Lee, Danny Mayo | 4:17 |
| 7. | "Love Lessons" | Jerry Kilgore, Ted Hewitt, Monty Powell, Sara Majors | 3:52 |
| 8. | "Heaven in My Woman's Eyes" | Mark Nesler | 3:24 |
| 9. | "Big Love" | Michael Clark, Jeff Stevens | 3:41 |
| 10. | "Don't Take Her She's All I Got" | Gary U.S. Bonds, Jerry Williams | 3:28 |
| 11. | "I'm from the Country" | Richard Young, Stan Webb, Marty Brown | 3:33 |

== Personnel on track 1 ==
- Tracy Byrd- lead vocals
- Larry Byrom- electric guitar
- Owen Hale- drums, percussion
- Aubrey Haynie- fiddle
- John Barlow Jarvis- piano
- Michael Rhodes- bass guitar
- John Wesley Ryles- background vocals
- Randy Scruggs- acoustic guitar
- Robby Turner- steel guitar
- Curtis Young- background vocals

== Charts ==
=== Weekly charts ===
| Chart (1999) | Peak position |
|---|---|
| US Billboard 200 | 70 |
| US Top Country Albums (Billboard) | 5 |

=== Year-end charts ===
| Chart (1999) | Position |
|---|---|
| US Top Country Albums (Billboard) | 51 |
