= Greatest Hits (Tracy Byrd album) =

Greatest hits album by Tracy Byrd
- Released: February 8, 2005
- Genre: Country
- Label: BNA
- Producer: Various; new tracks produced by Tracy Byrd & Billy Joe Walker, Jr.

Tracy Byrd chronology
The Truth About Men (2003)	Greatest Hits (2005)	Different Things (2006)

Singles from Greatest Hits
- 1. "Revenge of a Middle-Aged Woman" Released: October 2, 2004; 2. "Tiny Town" Released: March 25, 2005

Professional ratings
Review scores
Source	Rating
Allmusic	link

Greatest Hits is the second compilation album by American country music artist Tracy Byrd. It was released in 2005 as his only album for BNA Records. The tracks "Revenge of a Middle-Aged Woman" and "Johnny Cash" were previously unreleased; only the former was released as a single. "Johnny Cash", however, was later recorded by Jason Aldean for his 2007 album Relentless, and his version was a Top Ten hit on the country music charts. The songs "Watermelon Crawl" and "I'm from the Country" were newly recorded for this compilation.

== Track listing ==
No.	Title	Writer(s)	Length
1.	"The Truth About Men" (featuring Montgomery Gentry, Andy Griggs, and Blake Shelton)	Paul Overstreet, Rory Feek, Tim Johnson	2:59
2.	"Just Let Me Be in Love"	Mark Nesler, Tom Shapiro, Tony Martin	3:47
3.	"Drinkin' Bone"	Casey Beathard, Kerry Kurt Phillips	2:11
4.	"Watermelon Crawl"	Zack Turner, Buddy Brock	3:03
5.	"The Keeper of the Stars"	Karen Staley, Dickey Lee, Danny Mayo	4:21
6.	"A Good Way to Get on My Bad Side" (duet with Mark Chesnutt)	Rivers Rutherford, George Teren	3:34
7.	"Ten Rounds with José Cuervo"	Beathard, Michael P. Heeney, Marla Cannon-Goodman	3:03
8.	"Put Your Hand in Mine"	Skip Ewing, Jimmy Wayne	4:34
9.	"I'm from the Country"	Marty Brown, Stan Webb, Richard Young	3:39
10.	"Tiny Town"	Keith Stegall	3:27
11.	"Johnny Cash"	John Rich, Rodney Clawson, Vicky McGehee	3:05
12.	"Revenge of a Middle-Aged Woman"	Annie Tate, Sam Tate, Dave Berg	3:54

== Personnel ==
=== Tracks 4, 5, 9 ===
- Mike Brignardello - bass guitar
- Tracy Byrd - lead vocals
- Joe Carter - harmonica, background vocals
- Dan Dugmore - steel guitar
- Steve Gibson - electric guitar
- Aubrey Haynie - fiddle
- John Barlow Jarvis - B-3 organ, piano
- Paul Leim - drums
- John Wesley Ryles - background vocals
- Kenny Sears - fiddle
- Mike Taliaferro - background vocals
- Biff Watson - acoustic guitar
- Curtis "Mr. Harmony" Young - background vocals
- Reggie Young - electric guitar

=== Tracks 11, 12 ===
- Pat Buchanan - electric guitar
- Tracy Byrd - lead vocals
- Paul Franklin - steel guitar
- Aubrey Haynie - fiddle
- Wes Hightower - background vocals
- John Barlow Jarvis - B-3 organ, piano
- B. James Lowry - acoustic guitar
- Brent Mason - electric guitar
- Greg Morrow - drums
- Adam Shoenfeld - electric guitar
- Neil Thrasher - background vocals
- Billy Joe Walker Jr. - acoustic guitar, electric guitar
- Glenn Worf - bass guitar

== Chart performance ==
Chart (2005)	Peak position
U.S. Billboard Top Country Albums	14
U.S. Billboard 200	61
