= 1996 Country Music Association Awards =

Annual US music awards ceremony

- Date: October 2, 1996
- Location: Grand Ole Opry House, Nashville, Tennessee
- Hosted by: Vince Gill
- Most wins: George Strait (3)
- Most nominations: Vince Gill (7)

Television/radio coverage
- Network: CBS

The 1996 Country Music Association Awards, 30th Ceremony, was held on October 2, 1996 at the Grand Ole Opry House, Nashville, Tennessee, and was hosted by CMA Award Winner, Vince Gill.

== Winners and Nominees ==
Winner are in Bold.

Entertainer of the Year	Album of the Year
**Brooks & Dunn**; Garth Brooks; Vince Gill; Alan Jackson; George Strait	**George Strait — Blue Clear Sky**; Brooks & Dunn — Borderline; Vince Gill — High Lonesome Sound; Patty Loveless — The Trouble With The Truth; Martina McBride — Wild Angels
Male Vocalist of the Year	Female Vocalist of the Year
**George Strait**; Vince Gill; Alan Jackson; Collin Raye; Bryan White	**Patty Loveless**; Faith Hill; Martina McBride; Pam Tillis; Shania Twain
Vocal Group of the Year	Vocal Duo of the Year
**The Mavericks**; Alabama; BlackHawk; Diamond Rio; Sawyer Brown	**Brooks & Dunn**; Baker & Myers; Bellamy Brothers; Sweethearts of the Rodeo; John & Audrey Wiggins
Single of the Year	Song of the Year
**"Check Yes Or No" — George Strait**; "Blue" — LeAnn Rimes; "Go Rest High On That Mountain" — Vince Gill; "My Maria" — Brooks & Dunn; "Time Marches On" — Tracy Lawrence	**"Go Rest High On That Mountain" — Vince Gill**; "Any Man Of Mine" — Robert John "Mutt" Lange and Shania Twain; "Check Yes Or No" — Dana Hunt Oglesby and Danny M. Wells; Keeper of the Stars — Dickey Lee, Danny Mayo, and Karen Staley; "Time Marches On" — Bobby Braddock
Horizon Award	Musician of the Year
**Bryan White**; Terri Clark; Wade Hayes; LeAnn Rimes; Shania Twain	**Mark O'Connor**; Eddie Bayers; Paul Franklin; Brent Mason; Matt Rollings
Music Video of the Year	Vocal Event of the Year
**My Wife Thinks You're Dead — Junior Brown**; Check Yes Or No — George Strait; Go Rest High On That Mountain — Vince Gill; My Maria — Brooks & Dunn; Redneck Games — Alan Jackson and Jeff Foxworthy	**I Will Always Love You — Dolly Parton and Vince Gill**; Honky Tonkin's What I Do Best — Marty Stuart and Travis Tritt; On My Own — Reba McEntire, Martina McBride, Linda Davis, Trisha Yearwood; One — George Jones and Tammy Wynette; Redneck Games — Alan Jackson and Jeff Foxworthy

== Hall of Fame ==
Country Music Hall Of Fame Inductees
- Patsy Montana
- Buck Owens
- Ray Price
