= Big Love (disambiguation) =

Big Love is a TV series.

Big Love may also refer to:

- Big Love (play), a 2000 play by Charles L. Mee
- Big Love (Tracy Byrd album), 1996
  - "Big Love" (Tracy Byrd song)
- Big Love (Burner Herzog album), 2020
- Big Love (Simply Red album), 2015
- Big Love (Ali Campbell album), 1995
- "Big Love" (Fleetwood Mac song), 1987
- "Big Love" (The Bellamy Brothers song), 1989
- "Big Love", a song by Pete Heller
- "Big Love", a song by The Black Eyed Peas, 2018
- "Big Love", a song by Fitz and the Tantrums from Let Yourself Free, 2022
- "Big Love", a song by Little Village from the album Little Village, 1992
- "The Big L.", a song by Roxette
- bigLove, a 2001 short film
- The Big Love, a 1961 book by Florence Aadland, and Tedd Thomey

== See also ==
- BigBigLove, an album by Little Birdy
