= Ten Rounds =

Ten Rounds may refer to:

- Ten Rounds (Eddie Rabbitt album)
- Ten Rounds (Tracy Byrd album)

- "Ten Rounds with Jose Cuervo", a single from this album
