= Tracy Byrd (disambiguation) =

Tracy Byrd is a male country music singer.

Tracy Byrd may also refer to:

- Tracy Byrd (boxer), female boxer
- Tracy Byrd (album), an album by the singer
