= The Truth About Men =

The Truth About Men may refer to:

- The Truth About Men (album), a 2003 album by Tracy Byrd
- The Truth About Men (song), a 2003 song by Tracy Byrd
- The Truth About Men (film), a 1926 American silent drama film

== See also ==
- Truth About Men, a 2010 Danish comedy drama film
