= High and Dry (disambiguation) =

"High and Dry" is a 1995 song by Radiohead.

High and Dry may also refer to:

== Music ==
- High 'n' Dry, an album by Def Leppard, 1981
  - "High 'n' Dry (Saturday Night)", the title song
- High & Dry (album), by Marty Brown, or the title song, 1991
- "High and Dry", a song by Gordon Lightfoot from Sundown, 1974
- "High and Dry", a song by Poco from Cantamos, 1974
- "High and Dry", a song by the Rolling Stones from Aftermath, 1966

== Film and television ==
- High and Dry (film), or The Maggie, a 1954 British comedy film
- High & Dry (1987 TV series), a British sitcom
- High & Dry (2018 TV series), a British sitcom

== Other uses ==
- High and Dry, a 2007 book by Guy Pearse
- "High and dry", a reference to Anglican High Church clergy and laity
