= Niall Donnelly =

Irish entrepreneur

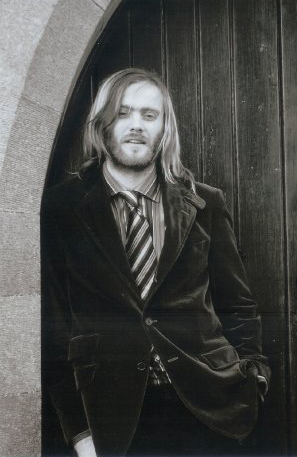
- Niall Donnelly
- Born: Navan, County Meath, Ireland
- Occupation: Entrepreneur
- Spouse: Kelly Beckett

Niall Donnelly is an Irish entrepreneur based in Los Angeles, California. He is known for Technology and Entertainment companies in Los Angeles and London has built a name for himself both sides of the Atlantic as a major force in the entertainment and technology industry.

== Early life and education ==
Niall was born in Mullagh, County Cavan and grew up in Navan, in County Meath, Ireland. He attended St. Patrick's Classical School in Navan, and went on to earn a degree in Geography and Politics at University College Dublin, where he served as the youngest ever Entertainments Officer in the history of UCD. He started his first business at age twelve, a tennis academy that earned him £30 per week.

== Career ==
Donnelly began his career in real estate, buying and selling properties and converting houses into flats. In 2005, Donnelly purchased a building on London's Chapel Market and converted it into Anam Cocktail Lounge. Gaelic for "Life & Soul" Anam was nominated for the Time Out Best Bar Award in 2005 and also The Evening Standard Bar of the Year Award in 2006.

Donnelly runs a holding company called Mad in the USA LLC, formerly Arrogant LLC. In 2008, Niall acquired streaming video website Newsplayer, along with business partner Brendan Morrissey. The site provides web access to historical news footage. In January 2009 The Irish Entrepreneur and The Irish Times called Donnelly one of the top 10 "Irish Entrepreneurs to Watch" worldwide.

In Feb 2011 Donnelly opened the first-ever US Rolling Stone magazine venue at the Hollywood and Highland Complex in Hollywood, CA. Rolling Stone LA is a multi-level space encompassing more than 10,000 square feet (930 m^{2}) in a blend of equal parts restaurant, bar, lounge and upscale private-event space.

Donnelly launched the first online nightlife reservation business Bevvy.com in 2011 and he was nominated in the "Top five Irish Entrepreneurs" by Smarta.com the same year. Bevvy was named in the "Top 100 Brilliant Companies in the US" by Entrepreneur Magazine in June issue 2011. In Sep 2012 Donnelly was named by the ITLG in the "Hollywood 50", honouring the most influential Irish or Irish American entertainment and technology executives in Hollywood.

In 2013 Donnelly launched the All-'Merican Festival Fustercluck in Temecula, California. Fustercluck is described as a 5k adventure full of hilarious Hillbillies and Hipsters followed by an epic hoedown where many of the fellers from Deliverance and Duck Dynasty make an appearance. The first event featured a 5k adventure through wild Southern California forests being chased by crazed hillbillies, followed by a fun Redneck Games competition and festival featuring the Honky Tonk Hubcap Hurl, Bobbin' For Pigs Feet, Cornhole, Redneck Horseshoes, Mud Belly Flop Contest, White Trash Beer Pong, BBQ Cook Off, Live Americana, Bluegrass and Country Bands. It was billed as the most All-'Merican event in 'Merica.
