= A Good Way to Get on My Bad Side =

Single by Tracy Byrd with Mark Chesnutt

from the album Ten Rounds
- B-side: "Put Your Hand in Mine"
- Released: March 24, 2001
- Genre: Country
- Length: 3:35
- Label: RCA Nashville
- Songwriter(s): Rivers Rutherford, George Teren
- Producer(s): Billy Joe Walker Jr., Tracy Byrd

Tracy Byrd singles chronology
"Now That's Awesome" (2000)	"A Good Way to Get on My Bad Side" (2001)	"Just Let Me Be in Love" (2001)

Mark Chesnutt singles chronology
"Lost in the Feeling" (2000)	"A Good Way to Get on My Bad Side" (2001)	"She Was" (2002)

"A Good Way to Get on My Bad Side" is a song recorded by American country music artists Tracy Byrd and Mark Chesnutt. It was released in March 2001 as the first single from Byrd's album Ten Rounds. The song reached #21 on the Billboard Hot Country Singles & Tracks chart. The song was written by Rivers Rutherford and George Teren.

== Content ==
Byrd and Chesnutt had been friends since both artists' major-label music careers began in the early 1990s. Byrd told Knight Ridder that he wanted to do a duet with Chesnutt for several years, but the opportunity for one never occurred until he found the song. He also presented it as an example of wanting to sound "different" on the corresponding album Ten Rounds, to which "A Good Way to Get on My Bad Side" served as lead single. The same publication describes the song as "toe-tapping, fast paced music" about a narrator who lists off various aspects that he finds a personal annoyance. One example listed in the last verse is a criticism of mainstream country music, wherein Byrd sings, "a little sissy in a cowboy hat ain't country".

== Chart performance ==
Chart (2001)	Peak position
US Bubbling Under Hot 100 Singles (Billboard)	21
US Hot Country Songs (Billboard)	21
