= It Must Be the Rain =

1993 single by Marty Brown

Single by Marty Brown

from the album Wild Kentucky Skies
- B-side: "Honky Tonk Special"
- Released: April 1993
- Genre: Country
- Length: 3:46
- Label: MCA Records
- Songwriter(s): Marty Brown
- Producer(s): Richard Bennett

Marty Brown singles chronology
"Wildest Dreams" (1992)	"'It Must Be the Rain'" (1993)	"I Don't Want to See You Again" (1993)

"It Must Be the Rain" is a song written and recorded by American country music singer-songwriter Marty Brown. It was released as the first single off his 1993 album Wild Kentucky Skies. It is Brown's only charting single, peaking at No. 74 on the Billboard Hot Country Singles & Tracks chart.

== Content ==
The lyrics portray a man who has just suffered the ending of a relationship, however he is still in denial that his lover has gone and states that he's not crying, but just the rain falling.

== Critical reception ==
A review on Billboard states that "Brown's own less-than-mournful delivery conspire to make this his most listenable effort yet."

== Chart performance ==
"It Must Be the Rain" debuted at number 74 on the U.S. Billboard Hot Country Singles & Tracks for the week of May 22, 1993.

Chart (1993)	Peak position
Hot Country Songs (Billboard)	74
Canadian RPM Country Tracks	62
