= Walking to Jerusalem =

Single by Tracy Byrd

from the album Love Lessons
- B-side: "Down on the Bottom"
- Released: July 25, 1995
- Recorded: 1994–1995
- Genre: Country
- Length: 3:25
- Label: MCA
- Songwriters: Sam Hogin, Mark D. Sanders
- Producer: Tony Brown

Tracy Byrd singles chronology
"The Keeper of the Stars" (1995)	"Walking to Jerusalem" (1995)	"Love Lessons" (1995)

"Walking to Jerusalem" is a song written by Sam Hogin and Mark D. Sanders, and recorded by American country music artist Tracy Byrd. It was released on July 25, 1995 as the lead single from the album Love Lessons. The song reached number 15 on the U.S. Billboard Hot Country Singles & Tracks chart and peaked at number 11 in Canada.

== Music video ==
The music video was directed by Gerry Wenner and was filmed in Saint Hedwig, Texas.

== Chart performance ==
"Walking to Jerusalem" debuted at number 68 on the U.S. Billboard Hot Country Single & Tracks for the week of June 3, 1995.

Chart (1995)	Peak position
Canada Country Singles (RPM)	11
US Billboard Hot 100	92
US Hot Country Songs (Billboard)	15

=== Year-end charts ===
Chart (1995)	Position
Canada Country Tracks (RPM)	75
