= Mixed Bag (Junior Brown album) =

Studio album by Junior Brown
- Released: July 31, 2001
- Genre: Country
- Label: Curb
- Producer: Junior Brown

Junior Brown chronology
Long Walk Back (1998)	Mixed Bag (2001)	Down Home Chrome (2004)

Mixed Bag is an album by the American musician Junior Brown, released on July 31, 2001. Brown described it as "free range country". He supported the album by opening for Dave Matthews Band on a North American tour. Mixed Bag peaked at No. 52 on Billboard's Top Country Albums chart.

== Production ==
The album was produced by Brown. "Kansas City Blues" is a cover of the Ernest Tubb song. "Riverboat Shuffle", on which Michael White played clarinet, is a version of the Hoagy Carmichael composition. "Guitar Man" was written by Jerry Reed. "Cagey Bea" is a narrative about a romance with a Russian spy. "Grow Up America" criticizes irresponsible parents.

== Critical reception ==
Professional ratings
Review scores
Source	Rating
All Music Guide to Country	3/5 stars
The Philadelphia Inquirer	3/4 stars
San Antonio Express-News	3/4 stars
USA Today	2.5/4 stars
Winnipeg Sun	3/5 stars

USA Today noted that Brown "favors shuffles and blues that let him show off his considerable picking skills, and sad songs with bad puns that his deep, sinuous voice milks for all their worth." The Philadelphia Inquirer said that "Brown's hard-country-rooted guitar heroism remains a unique niche". Robert Christgau praised "Cagey Bea".

The San Antonio Express-News admired Brown's "trademark bold and brassy baritone". The Winnipeg Sun called him "one of the finest fretmen in Nashville." The Gazette listed Mixed Bag as the eighth best country album of 2001. The State placed it at No. 25 on its list of the year's 50 best albums.

== Track listing ==
No.	Title	Length
1.	"Guitar Man"
2.	"Ain't Gonna Work Today"
3.	"Riverboat Shuffle"
4.	"Our First Bluebonnet Spring"
5.	"Cagey Bea"
6.	"Runnin' with the Wind"
7.	"Catfish and Collard Greens"
8.	"Little Town Square"
9.	"Hard Living Hard"
10.	"Kansas City Blues"
11.	"Grow Up America"
12.	"The Chase"
