= Newsplayer =

- Type: Private
- Industry: Video
- Founded: October 1999
- Defunct: May 2012
- Headquarters: Saint Sampson, Guernsey, Channel Islands
- Key people: Niall Donnelly, Brendan Morrissey

Newsplayer Limited (a company dissolved in May 2012) was a streaming video website of historical news footage. The service provided online access to newsreel video clips and television news reports spanning the last 100 years. The online digital archive featured over 14,000 video clips of licensed material from the libraries of ITN, Reuters, Pathe News and EMI.

== Background ==
Newsplayer allowed users to browse and retrieve video clips by keyword, topic or year. The Newsplayer library included news footage of key moments in history from the 20th Century from 1896 to the early 2000s. Videos were streamed on demand via Adobe Flash progressive download.

== Company history ==
First launched in October 1999. Newsplayer broadcast Paramount News, Pathe News, ITN and Reuters video archive to users on a subscription-based model. Original board members of the Newsplayer group included co-founders Paul Duffen (the ex chairman of Hull City association football club) Barry Llewellyn and Steven Smith. Original directors also included David Frost who granted Newsplayer access to his onscreen interview archive spanning four decades. By 2003, Newsplayer faced a funding crisis.

In 2008 Newsplayer was acquired by Niall Donnelly and Brendan Morrissey.

On December 8, 2008, Newsplayer beta was re-launched as a free to view video streaming website. The company announced on their website that a fully featured version of Newsplayer was planned for January 2009. The company expanded its video archive by forming alliances with media and technology partners, alongside its license with ITN and Reuters.

== Closure ==
The last date that the Internet Archive captured a screenshot of the Newsplayer site was March 17, 2013. Newsplayer is now offline.

Newsplayer Limited was dissolved on May 22, 2012.
