= Junior Brown =

American country guitarist and singer

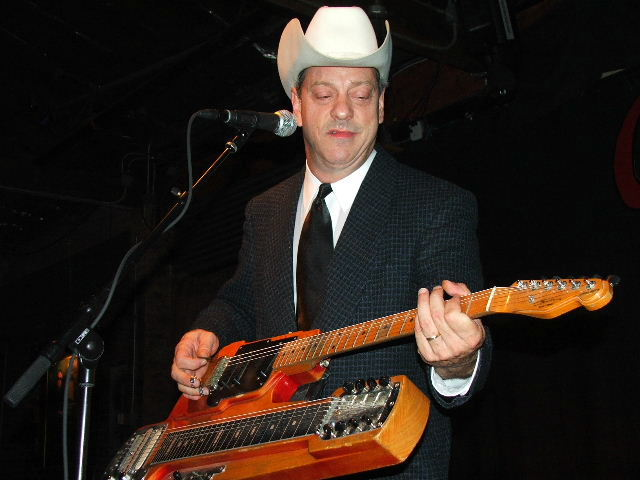
- Brown with his guit-steel at Antone's in Austin, Texas, 2006

Background information
- Born: Jamieson Brown; June 12, 1952 (age 74); Cottonwood, Arizona, US
- Genre: Country
- Occupations: Musician, singer-songwriter, actor
- Instruments: "Guit-steel"; vocals
- Years active: 1960s–present
- Labels: Curb, Telarc
- Website: juniorbrown.com

Jamieson "Junior" Brown (born June 12, 1952) is an American country guitarist and singer. He has released 12 studio albums in his career, and has charted twice on the Billboard country singles charts. Brown's signature instrument is the "guit-steel" double-neck guitar, a hybrid of electric guitar and lap steel guitar.

== Life and career ==
Brown was born in Cottonwood, Arizona; at an early age, his family moved to Kirksville, Indiana. He first learned to play piano from his father (Samuel Emmons Brown Jr.) "before I could talk". His music career began in the 1960s, and he worked through that decade and the next singing and playing pedal steel and guitar for groups such as the Last Mile Ramblers, Dusty Drapes and the Dusters, Billy Spears, and Asleep at the Wheel while developing his guitar skills. In the early 1980s, he appeared on stage with Rank and File as the replacement for Alejandro Escovedo, but he did not feature on any recordings by that band.

By the mid-1980s, Brown was teaching guitar at the Hank Thompson School of Country Music at Rogers State University in Claremore, Oklahoma.

In 1985, Brown created a new type of double-neck guitar, with some assistance from Michael Stevens. Brown called the instrument his "guit-steel". When performing, Brown plays the guitar by standing behind it, while it rests on a small music stand. The top neck on the guit-steel is a traditional six-string guitar, while the lower neck is a full-sized lap-steel guitar for slide playing. Brown has two guit-steels for recording and live work. The original instrument, dubbed "Old Yeller", has as its standard six-string guitar portion the neck and pickups from Brown's previous stage guitar, a Fender Bullet. The second guit-steel, named "Big Red", has a neck laser-copied from the Bullet neck; in addition to electric guitar pickups, though, both the standard and lap-steel necks use identical Sho-Bud lap-steel pickups. A pocket in the upper bout of the guitar holds the slide bar when it is not in use. Brown also commissioned a "pedal guit-steel", which adds pedals to the instrument for more musical control. Brown has stated that the invention of the guit-steel was always a matter of convenience so he could play both lap-steel and lead guitar during live performances and not directly motivated by a desire to be a "one-man band".

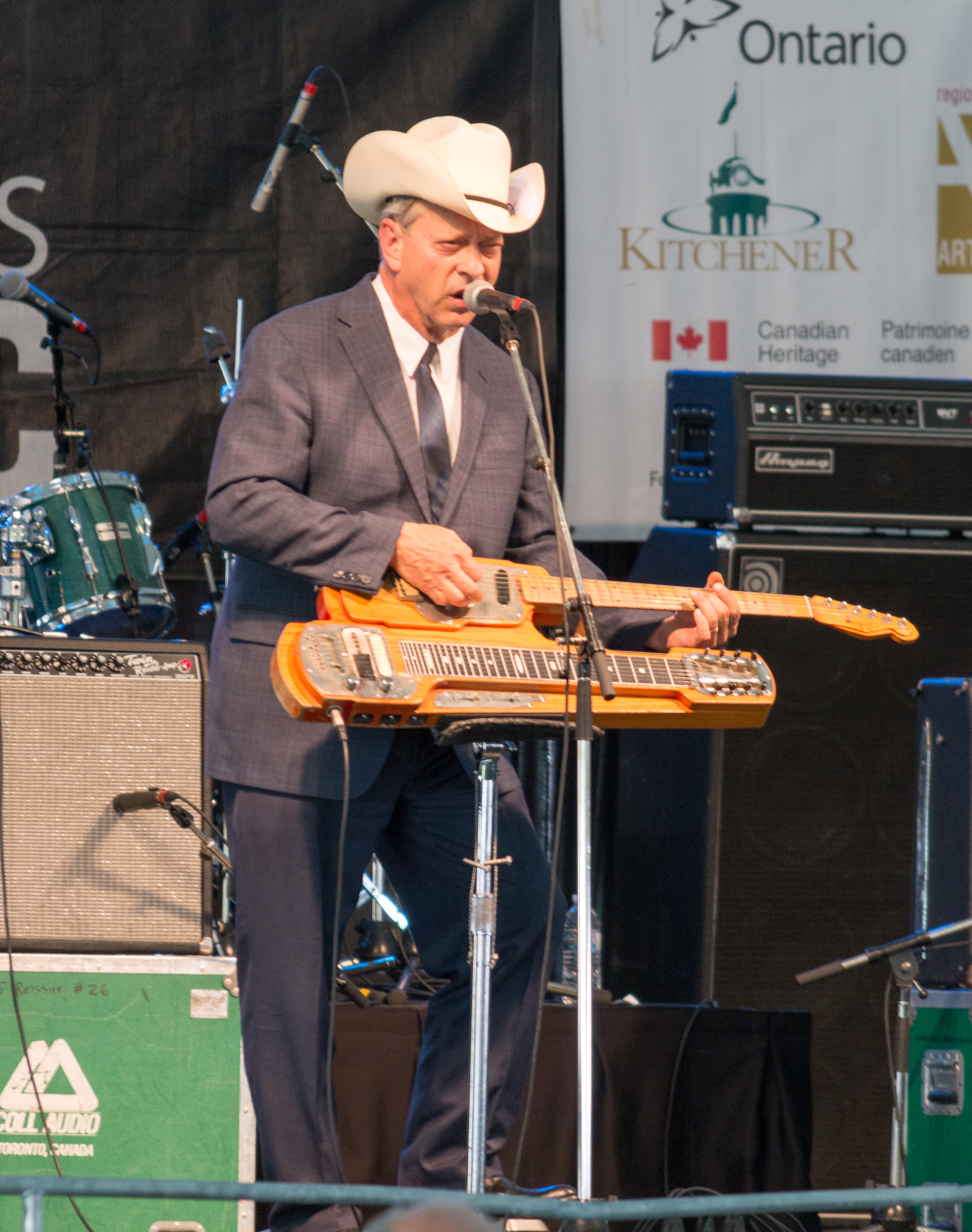
Junior Brown performing at the 2014 Kitchener Blues Festival

Brown quickly became a local success in Austin, Texas, as the house band at the Continental Club. His debut album was 12 Shades of Brown (1990), released by the British company Demon Records; it was re-released in 1993 on Curb Records in the United States, followed by Guit with It. In 1996, Brown released Semi Crazy and followed it with Long Walk Back (1998).

In 1996, Brown was featured on the Beach Boys' now out-of-print album Stars and Stripes Vol. 1 performing a cover of their 1962 hit "409". The song features Brown playing guitar and singing lead with the Beach Boys singing harmonies and backing vocals.

Brown appeared in the music video for "Honky Tonk Song" by George Jones in 1996, and also won the CMA Country Music Video of the Year award that year for his video, "My Wife Thinks You're Dead", which featured 6-foot, 7-inch Gwendolyn Gillingham. Brown played a cameo part in "Drive", the second episode of season six of The X-Files. Brown's music has been showcased on various television series and movie soundtracks, including Me, Myself & Irene, SpongeBob SquarePants, and the 2005 Dukes of Hazzard remake, in which he also played the narrator.

Although Brown plays such neotraditional country styles as honky-tonk, Western swing, etc., some of his performances finish with some blues and Tex-Mex tunes playing, as well as surf rock instrumentals.

Beginning in August 2006, Brown joined Webb Wilder's tour of American minor league baseball stadiums. He reprised his role in an episode ("World of Hurt, BC") of Adult Swim's Xavier: Renegade Angel created by rock band PFFR. In April 2008, Brown shot three pilot episodes of a country-music program modeled after programs from the early 1960s, in which Brown would play with a house band, as well as guests, as host of the show. On October 12, 2012, Brown released the EP Volume 10, containing six new songs.

AMC previewed the video of his new song "Better Call Saul", on October 5, 2014. On May 24, 2018, Brown released his 11th album, Deep in the Heart of Me.

== Discography ==
=== Albums ===
Year	Album	Chart positions	
Year	Album	US Country	US Heat
1974	The Last Mile Ramblers – While They Last!	—	—
1990	12 Shades of Brown (original Demon Records release)	—	—
1993	12 Shades of Brown (Curb Records reissue)	—	—
1993	Guit with It	—	—
1995	Junior High (EP)	48	26
1996	Semi Crazy	32	19
1998	Long Walk Back	34	19
2001	Mixed Bag	52	—
2004	Down Home Chrome	73	—
2005	Greatest Hits	—	—
2005	Live at the Continental Club: The Austin Experience	—	—
2012	Volume Ten	—	—
2018	Deep in the Heart of Me	—	—
2021	His and Hers		
2024	The American Original		

=== Singles ===
Year	Title	US Country	Album
1993	"Highway Patrol"	73	Guit with It
1995	"My Wife Thinks You're Dead"	68	Junior High
1996	"Venom Wearin' Denim"	—	Semi Crazy
1996	"I Hung It Up"	—	Semi Crazy
1997	"Gotta Sell Them Chickens" (w/ Hank Thompson)	—	Real Thing (Hank Thompson album)

=== Music videos ===
Year	Video	Director
1993	"Highway Patrol"	Roger Pistole
1995	"My Wife Thinks You're Dead"	Michael McNamara
1995	"Sugarfoot Rag"	Roger Pistole
1996	"Venom Wearin' Denim"	Michael McNamara
1996	"I Hung It Up"	Michael McNamara
1996	"409"	
1997	"Gotta Sell Them Chickens" (w/ Hank Thompson)	Jim Gerik

== Awards and nominations ==
=== Grammy Awards ===
Year	Nominee / work	Award	Result
1996	Junior High	Best Country Album	Nominated
1997	"My Wife Thinks You're Dead"	Best Male Country Vocal Performance	Nominated
1997	"My Wife Thinks You're Dead"	Best Country Song	Nominated

=== Academy of Country Music Awards ===
Year	Nominee / work	Award	Result
1996	"My Wife Thinks You're Dead"	Video of the Year	Nominated

=== Country Music Association Awards ===
Year	Nominee / work	Award	Result
1996	"My Wife Thinks You're Dead"	Video of the Year	Won
