= I Wanna Feel That Way Again =

Single by Tracy Byrd

from the album I'm from the Country
- B-side: "Gettin' Me Over Mountains"
- Released: June 22, 1998
- Genre: Country
- Length: 3:25
- Label: MCA Nashville
- Songwriters: Danni Leigh, Jeff Stevens, Steve Bogard
- Producer: Tony Brown

Tracy Byrd singles chronology
"I'm from the Country" (1998)	"I Wanna Feel That Way Again" (1998)	"When Mama Ain't Happy" (1999)

"I Wanna Feel That Way Again" is a song written by Danni Leigh, Jeff Stevens and Steve Bogard, and recorded by American country music artist Tracy Byrd. It was released in June 1998 as the second and final single from the album I'm from the Country. The song reached number 9 on the Billboard Hot Country Singles & Tracks chart.

== Chart performance ==
"I Wanna Feel That Way Again" debuted at number 75 on the U.S. Billboard Hot Country Singles & Tracks for the week of June 20, 1998.

Chart (1998)	Peak position
Canada Country Singles (RPM)	28
US Hot Country Songs (Billboard)	9

=== Year-end charts ===
Chart (1998)	Position
US Country Songs (Billboard)	68
