= Don't Love Make a Diamond Shine =

Single by Tracy Byrd

from the album Big Love
- B-side: "Tucson Too Soon"
- Released: May 17, 1997
- Genre: Country
- Length: 3:21
- Label: MCA
- Songwriters: Mike Dekle, Craig Wiseman
- Producer: Tony Brown

Tracy Byrd singles chronology
"Don't Take Her She's All I Got" (1997)	"Don't Love Make a Diamond Shine" (1997)	"Good Ol' Fashioned Love" (1997)

"Don't Love Make a Diamond Shine" is a song written by Mike Dekle and Craig Wiseman, and recorded by American country music artist Tracy Byrd. It was released in May 1997 as the third and final single from the album Big Love. The song reached #19 on the Billboard Hot Country Singles & Tracks chart.

== Critical reception ==
Billboard gave the single a positive review, saying that it had a "strong lyric with a sweet sentiment".

== Chart performance ==
Chart (1997)	Peak position
Canada Country Singles (RPM)	13
US Hot Country Songs (Billboard)	17
