= I'm from the Country =

Studio album by Tracy Byrd
- Released: May 12, 1998
- Recorded: 1997–1998
- Genre: Country
- Length: 31:52
- Label: MCA Nashville
- Producer: Tony Brown

Tracy Byrd chronology
Big Love (1996)	I'm from the Country (1998)	Keepers: Greatest Hits (1999)

Singles from I'm from the Country
- 1. "I'm from the Country" Released: February 3, 1998; 2. "I Wanna Feel That Way Again" Released: June 22, 1998

Professional ratings
Review scores
Source	Rating
Allmusic	4/5 stars

I'm from the Country is the fifth studio album by American country music artist Tracy Byrd. Released in May 1998 as his final studio album for MCA Records, it produced only two singles: the title track and "I Wanna Feel That Way Again", both of which reached Top Ten on the Billboard Hot Country Singles & Tracks (now Hot Country Songs) charts that year, peaking at #3 and #9, respectively. "I'm from the Country" was co-written by Richard Young, rhythm guitarist for the band The Kentucky Headhunters. The album was originally to be titled Walkin' the Line.

== Track listing ==
No.	Title	Writer(s)	Length
1.	"Gettin' Me Over Mountains"	Tracy Byrd, Larry Boone, Paul Nelson	3:13
2.	"I Wanna Feel That Way Again"	Steve Bogard, Jeff Stevens, Danni Leigh	3:23
3.	"I Still Love the Night Life"	Brad Paisley, Kelley Lovelace	2:24
4.	"For Me It's You"	Mark Nesler, Tony Martin	3:09
5.	"I've Got What It Takes"	Stevens, Marv Green	3:02
6.	"On Again, Off Again"	Austin Cunningham, Gil Grand	3:05
7.	"Walkin' the Line"	Shawn Camp, Randy Hardison, Wynn Varble	3:15
8.	"Back to Texas"	Tom Damphier, Stacey Beyer	3:36
9.	"Old One Better"	Nesler, Martin	3:15
10.	"I'm from the Country"	Marty Brown, Stan Webb, Richard Young	3:30

== Personnel ==
- Mike Brignardello - bass guitar
- Tracy Byrd - lead vocals
- Larry Byrom - bass guitar, acoustic guitar, electric guitar
- Johnny Lee Carpenter - fiddle
- Mark Casstevens - acoustic guitar
- Glen Duncan - fiddle
- Stuart Duncan - fiddle
- Paul Franklin - fiddle, steel guitar
- Steve Gibson - electric guitar
- Owen Hale - drums
- Brent Mason - electric guitar
- Steve Nathan - keyboards, piano
- Tom Roady - percussion
- John Wesley Ryles - background vocals
- Scotty Sanders - steel guitar
- Randy Scruggs - acoustic guitar, electric guitar
- Harry Stinson - tambourine, background vocals
- Billy Thomas - background vocals
- Robby Turner - steel guitar
- Lonnie Wilson - drums, keyboards
- Glenn Worf - bass guitar

== Charts ==
=== Weekly charts ===
Chart (1998)	Peak position
Canadian Albums (RPM)	87
Canadian Country Albums (RPM)	9
US Billboard 200	58
US Top Country Albums (Billboard)	8

=== Year-end charts ===
Chart (1998)	Position
US Top Country Albums (Billboard)	55
