= Semi Crazy =

Studio album by Junior Brown
- Released: 1996
- Genres: Country, rock and roll
- Label: MCG/Curb
- Producer: Junior Brown

Junior Brown chronology
Junior High EP (1995)	Semi Crazy (1996)	Long Walk Back (1998)

Semi Crazy is an album by the American musician Junior Brown, released in 1996. It contains the crossover hit "Surf Medley", featuring three popular surf rock songs.

The album peaked at No. 32 on Billboard's Top Country Albums chart. Brown supported Semi Crazy by touring with the Mavericks. Its first single was "Venom Wearing Denim".

== Production ==
The album was produced by Brown. "Semi-Crazy" is a duet with Red Simpson. "Hong Kong Blues" was written by Hoagy Carmichael. Brown's intention was to craft a mainstream album; he did not want to be considered a revivalist/traditionalist or an outsider artist.

== Critical reception ==
Professional ratings
Review scores
Source	Rating
AllMusic	4/5 stars
The Austin Chronicle	3.5/5 stars
Robert Christgau	(2-star Honorable Mention)
Entertainment Weekly	A−
The Indianapolis Star	4/4 stars
Los Angeles Times	3.5/4 stars
Orlando Sentinel	5/5 stars
Rolling Stone	3/5 stars

Robert Christgau deemed the album "the essence of Western swing—jazzy picking, lousy singing, and a light heart." Entertainment Weekly wrote: "A virtuoso picker (guitar freaks will appreciate the jaw-dropping pyrotechnics of 'I Hung It Up', and his definitive 'Surf Medley'), Brown’s a casually irreverent humorist to boot." Rolling Stone thought that Brown "straddles the fence between Nashville airplay and Texas grit" on "Gotta Get Up Every Morning" and "Surf Medley". The Orlando Sentinel determined that the album "is chock full of the kind of catchy, clever, instantly memorable songs that used to be a staple of country radio."

Texas Monthly called "Semi-Crazy" "the first decent truckin’ song in more than a decade." The Chicago Reader stated that "while Brown and his band may look like Republican staffers, his witty, jaunty music is anything but conservative." The Los Angeles Times concluded that "by stretching stories of wayward lovers almost beyond believability—as Hank Williams himself often did—Brown magnifies and clarifies the very real emotions underlying them." The Indianapolis Star considered the album to be "a masterpiece" and "a collection of Ernest Tubb-meets-Jimi Hendrix country music."

AllMusic wrote that Brown's "clever lyrics, Ernest Tubb-like voice, and virtuoso guitar playing ... are once again intact and on the mark."

== Track listing ==
All tracks written by Junior Brown except where noted.

1. "Gotta Get Up Every Morning" – 1:58
2. "Darlin' I'll Do Anything You Say" – 2:49
3. "I Hung It Up" – 3:33
4. "I Want to Hear It from You" (Fred Carter Jr.) – 3:11
5. "Semi-Crazy" (Junior Brown, Ron Avis) – 3:23
  - duet with Red Simpson
6. "Hong Kong Blues" (Hoagy Carmichael) – 3:32
7. "Venom Wearing Denim" – 2:38
8. "Parole Board" – 3:40
9. "Joe the Singing Janitor" – 3:18
10. "Surf Medley" – 7:08
  - medley of "Pipeline" (Brian Carman, Bob Spickard), "Walk, Don't Run" (Johnny Smith), and "Secret Agent Man" (Steve Barri, P. F. Sloan)

== Musicians ==
- Junior Brown – vocals, guitar, steel guitar
- Tanya Rae Brown – rhythm guitar, harmony vocals
- Steve Lane – bass, harmony vocals
- Tommy Lewis – drums
- Danny Levin – piano on tracks 3, 4, 5, 6, 8, and 9
- Red Simpson – vocals on track 5
