= Freddie North =

American R&B singer (born 1939)

- Birth name: Frederick North
- Also known as: Freddie
- Born: 1939 (age 85–86); Nashville, Tennessee, United States
- Genres: R&B
- Occupation: Singer

Freddie North (born 28 May 1939, in Nashville, Tennessee) is an American R&B singer.

North had experience as a disc jockey at WLAC-Nashville and in promotion for Nashboro Records, who released gospel music. In 1971 he released an album, Friend, on Mankind Records (U.S. #179, U.S. R&B Albums #41). The disc yielded two hit singles, "She's All I Got" (U.S. #39, U.S. R&B Singles #10) and "You and Me Together Forever" (U.S. #116, U.S. R&B Singles #26). A third single, "Sweeter than Sweetness" reached #107 on the U.S. Cashbox chart.
