= Long Walk Back =

Studio album by Junior Brown
- Released: 1998
- Genre: Country
- Length: 40:36
- Label: Curb
- Producer: Junior Brown

Junior Brown chronology
Semi Crazy (1996)	Long Walk Back (1998)	Mixed Bag (2001)

Long Walk Back is an album by the American musician Junior Brown, released in 1998. He supported it with a North American tour and an appearance on an episode of The X-Files. The album peaked at No. 34 on the Billboard Top Country Albums chart.

== Production ==
The album was produced by Brown, who also wrote nine of the eleven songs. He decided not to include as many comedic songs; "Read 'Em and Weep" is an attempt at a traditional country ballad. "Rock-A-Hula Baby" is a cover of the song made famous by Elvis Presley. "Lookin' for Love" is a version of the song from the Connie Francis film. Mitch Mitchell played drums on "Stupid Blues" and "Keepin' Up with You". Brown's wife, Tanya Rae, and Jimmy Capps doubled on rhythm guitar to create a bigger sound. "Peelin' Taters" is an instrumental.

== Critical reception ==
Professional ratings
Review scores
Source	Rating
Boston Herald	3.5/4 stars
Robert Christgau	(2-star Honorable Mention)
Entertainment Weekly	A−
Los Angeles Times	2.5/4 stars
Pittsburgh Post-Gazette	4/4 stars
USA Today	3/4 stars

The Pittsburgh Post-Gazette praised "the deepest country voice since the late Ernest Tubb." Texas Monthly wrote that "Brown is so danged gifted that he'd be pigeonholed as the guitar hero's guitar hero if not for his peculiar subject matter, which ping-pongs from hula girls and fast cars to pure schmaltz." USA Today considered the songs "old-fashioned Texas shuffles, kitschy '60s-style retro-rock with cooing girl choruses, and feedback-laced blues numbers that mix in jazz voicings and country licks."

The Village Voice concluded that Brown's "one of those artists, almost impossibly rare, whose ideas just can't be predicted... What he really does is just flat git it when the going gets strange." Robert Christgau deemed the album "virtuosity as novelty act, meaning virtuosity that knows itself." Entertainment Weekly noted that Long Walk Back was "the first time the radical-traditionalist Texan honky-tonker has made a record as out-there as his talent merits." The Los Angeles Times wrote that "Brown is still more involving than your standard country fare, but his own musical path seems unusually straight this time out." The Vancouver Sun, the Orange County Register, and The Denver Post were among the many periodicals that considered Long Walk Back to be one of the best albums of 1998.

== Track listing ==
No.	Title	Length
1.	"Long Walk Back to San Antone"	3:35
2.	"The Better Half"	2:46
3.	"Read 'Em and Weep"	3:06
4.	"Rock-A-Hula Baby"	2:28
5.	"Lookin' for Love"	2:28
6.	"Peelin' Taters"	2:54
7.	"Freedom Machine"	3:24
8.	"Just a Little Love"	3:40
9.	"Keepin' Up with You"	3:49
10.	"I'm All Fired Up"	3:34
11.	"Stupid Blues"	8:52
Total length:		40:36

== Charts ==
Chart performance for Long Walk Back
Chart (1998)	Peak position
US Top Country Albums (Billboard)	34
