= Wild Kentucky Skies =

Studio album by Marty Brown
- Released: March 16, 1993
- Recorded: 1992
- Studio: Grand Javelina (Nashville, Tennessee); Woodland (Nashville, Tennessee)
- Genre: Country
- Length: 39:53
- Label: MCA
- Producer: Richard Bennett, Tony Brown (track 5)

Marty Brown chronology
High & Dry (1991)	Wild Kentucky Skies (1993)	Cryin', Lovin', Leavin (1994)

Wild Kentucky Skies is the second album released by country music artist Marty Brown. The album was released by MCA Records on March 16, 1993. This album produced his only charting single, "It Must Be the Rain", which only reached #74 in the U.S. and #62 in Canada.

== Critical reception ==
The album was praised by Allmusic critic Brian Mansfield for "possessing qualities that people both hate and love about country music." He compares several songs to those of the Everly Brothers and calls the album "Pure country without being a purist."

== Track listing ==
All tracks written by Marty Brown unless indicated otherwise.

1. "It Must Be the Rain" - 3:46
2. "Let's Begin Again" (Hank DeVito, Danny Flowers) - 3:10
3. "God Knows" - 4:17
4. "No Honky Tonkin' Tonight" - 2:55
5. "I'd Rather Fish Than Fight" - 2:35
6. "Honey I Ain't No Fool" - 4:20
7. "I Don't Want to See You Again" (Jackson Leap) - 4:09
8. "Freight Train" - 4:55
9. "She's Gone" - 4:59
10. "Wild Kentucky Skies" - 4:28
  - Performed live
  - Arranged by Glen D. Hardin

== Personnel ==
As listed in liner notes.

- Sam Bacco - tambourine, tympani, prepared piano
- Richard Bennett - guitar
- Marty Brown - lead vocals, guitar, harmony vocals
- Terry Crisp - steel guitar
- Dan Dugmore - steel guitar, dobro
- Glen Duncan - fiddle
- Stuart Duncan - fiddle
- Buddy Emmons - steel guitar
- Dave Hoffner - keyboards, piano
- David Hungate - bass guitar
- John Barlow Jarvis - piano
- Larrie Londin - drums
- Larry Marrs - harmony vocals
- Bill Miller - courting flute, rain stick
- Rocky Schnaars and Ken Hutton - vocal effects, tubes and hoses
- Harry Stinson - harmony vocals
- Marty Stuart - mandolin
- Billy Thomas - drums
- Joy Lynn White - harmony vocals

== Sources ==
- CMT
- AOL Music
