= Love Lessons (song) =

Single by Tracy Byrd

from the album Love Lessons
- B-side: "Don't Need That Heartache"
- Released: August 29, 1995
- Recorded: 1995
- Genre: Country
- Length: 3:52
- Label: MCA
- Songwriters: Jerry Kilgore; Monty Powell; Ted Hewitt; Sarah Majors
- Producer: Tony Brown

Tracy Byrd singles chronology
"Walking to Jerusalem" (1995)	"Love Lessons" (1995)	"Heaven in My Woman's Eyes" (1996)

"Love Lessons" is a song written by Jerry Kilgore, Monty Powell, Ted Hewitt and Sarah Majors, and recorded by American country music artist Tracy Byrd. It was released in August 1995 as the second single and title track from the album Love Lessons. The song reached #9 on the Billboard Hot Country Singles & Tracks chart.

== Critical reception ==
Larry Flick, of Billboard magazine reviewed the song favorably, saying that Byrd slows the pace to deliver "a pretty, romantic ballad." He goes on to say that "Byrd's smooth, rich voice and Brown's solid production make this one a winner."

== Chart performance ==
Chart (1995)	Peak position
Canada Country Singles (RPM)	13
US Bubbling Under Hot 100 (Billboard)	19
US Hot Country Songs (Billboard)	9
