= Different Things =

Studio album by Tracy Byrd
- Released: September 26, 2006
- Genre: Country
- Label: Blind Mule
- Producer: Tracy Byrd; Mike Geiger

Tracy Byrd chronology
Greatest Hits (2005)	Different Things (2006)	All American Texan (2016)

Singles from Different Things
- 1. "Cheapest Motel" Released: 2006; 2. "Better Places Than This" Released: 2007

Different Things is the ninth studio album by American country music artist Tracy Byrd. It was released in 2006 on Byrd's own Blind Mule label. The songs "Cheapest Motel" and "Better Places Than This" were released as singles. The former reached a peak of #55 on the Hot Country Songs charts in 2006.

== Track listing ==
1. "Different Things" (Brice Long, Bobby Taylor, John Ramey) – 3:32
2. "The More I Feel Like Rockin'" (Mark Nesler, Tony Martin, Jim Collins) – 3:11
3. "She Was Smart" (Tracy Byrd, Martin, Nesler) – 3:01
4. "A Cowboy and a Dancer" (Kevin Denney, John Edwards) – 3:45
5. "The Biggest Thing in Texas" (Phyllis Austin, Mike Geiger, Woody Mullis) – 2:40
6. "Just One Woman" (Ramey) – 4:19
7. "Saltwater Cowboy" (J.R. Shelby, Phil O'Donnell, Cyril Rawson) – 3:48
8. "Cheapest Motel" (Cole Deggs, Geiger, Trey Matthews) – 3:48
9. "Better Places Than This" (Geiger, Mullis, Mike Huffman) – 3:51
10. "Before I Die" (Matthews, Mullis) – 4:58
11. "Hot Night in the Country" (Byrd, Nesler, Martin) – 3:40

== Personnel ==
- Tracy Byrd - lead vocals
- Joe Lee Carter - background vocals
- J.T. Corenflos - electric guitar
- Mike Geiger - harmonica
- Kevin "Swine" Grantt - bass guitar
- Tommy Harden - drums
- Aubrey Haynie - fiddle
- Mike Johnson - steel guitar
- Gordon Mote - keyboards
- Gary Prim - keyboards
- John Wesley Ryles - background vocals
- Marty Slayton - background vocals
- Mike Taliaferro - background vocals
- Biff Watson - acoustic guitar
- Glenn Worf - bass guitar

== Chart performance ==
Chart (2006)	Peak position
U.S. Billboard Top Country Albums	36
U.S. Billboard 200	165
U.S. Billboard Independent Albums	15
