= High & Dry (album) =

Album by Marty Brown

Studio album by Marty Brown
- Released: August 20, 1991
- Genre: Country
- Length: 33:25
- Label: MCA
- Producer: Tony Brown, Richard Bennett

Marty Brown chronology
| High & Dry (1991) | Wild Kentucky Skies (1993) |

Singles from High & Dry
- 1. "Every Now and Then" Released: May 1991; 2. "High and Dry" Released: August 1991; 3. "Wildest Dreams" Released: October 1991

Professional ratings
Review scores
| Source | Rating |
|---|---|
| AllMusic | 4.5/5 stars |

High & Dry is the debut album by American country music singer-songwriter Marty Brown. It was produced by Tony Brown and released in August 1991 on MCA Records. It featured 3 singles (the title track, "Wildest Dreams" and "Every Now and Then"), none of which charted. The album itself peaked at number 44 and spent 20 weeks on the Top Country Albums chart.

== Track listing ==
All tracks are written by Marty Brown; "Your Sugar Daddy's Long Gone" co-written by Barbara Carter,

| No. | Title | Length |
|---|---|---|
| 1. | "High and Dry" | 3:56 |
| 2. | "Your Sugar Daddy's Long Gone" | 2:23 |
| 3. | "Indian Summer Blues" | 3:51 |
| 4. | "Every Now and Then" | 2:50 |
| 5. | "I'll Climb Any Mountain" | 4:33 |
| 6. | "Don't Worry Baby" | 2:09 |
| 7. | "Honky Tonk Special" | 3:29 |
| 8. | "Wildest Dreams" | 4:03 |
| 9. | "Ole King Kong" | 3:01 |
| 10. | "Nobody Knows" | 3:06 |

== Production ==
- Produced By Tony Brown & Richard Bennett
- Engineers: Chuck Ainlay, Bob Bullock, John Hampton, Russ Martin, Jeff Powell
- Assistant Engineer: Russ Martin
- Mixing: John Hampton
- Mix Assistant: Jeff Powell
- Mastering: Denny Purcell

== Personnel ==
- Drums: Larrie Londin, Billy Thomas
- Bass: Marty Brown, Emory Gordy, Jr., Roy Huskey, Tom Robb
- Piano: John Jarvis
- Organ: Tony Brown
- Guitars: Richard Bennett, Marty Brown, Reggie Young
- Steel: Terry Crisp, Buddy Emmons, Steve Fishell
- Banjo, Ukulele: Richard Bennett
- Cornet: George Tidwell
- Clarinet: Sam Levine
- Backing Vocals: Peter Cronin, Susan Levy, Jessie Noble

== Chart performance ==
| Chart (1991) | Peak position |
|---|---|
| U.S. Billboard Top Country Albums | 44 |
| U.S. Billboard Top Heatseekers | 17 |
