= Just Let Me Be in Love =

Single by Tracy Byrd

from the album Ten Rounds
- B-side: "Somebody's Dream"
- Released: August 13, 2001
- Genre: Country
- Length: 3:48
- Label: RCA Nashville
- Songwriters: Mark Nesler; Tom Shapiro; Tony Martin
- Producers: Tracy Byrd; Billy Joe Walker Jr.

Tracy Byrd singles chronology
"A Good Way to Get on My Bad Side" (2001)	"Just Let Me Be in Love" (2001)	"Ten Rounds with Jose Cuervo" (2002)

"Just Let Me Be in Love" is a song written by Tom Shapiro, Tony Martin and Mark Nesler, and recorded by American country music artist Tracy Byrd. It was released in August 2001 as the second single from his album Ten Rounds. It peaked at number 9 on the Hot Country Songs chart.

== Content ==
The song's narrator just wants to be in love with a woman, and doesn't care about what the future might hold for their relationship.

== Music video ==
The music video was directed by the directing duo Deaton-Flanigen. It was filmed on Anna Maria Island in Florida.

== Chart performance ==
"Just Let Me Be in Love" debuted at number 49 on the U.S. Billboard Hot Country Singles & Tracks for the week of August 25, 2001.

Chart (2001–2002)	Peak position
US Hot Country Songs (Billboard)	9
US Billboard Hot 100	64

=== Year-end charts ===
Chart (2002)	Position
US Country Songs (Billboard)	58
