= 4 to 1 in Atlanta =

Single by Tracy Byrd

from the album Love Lessons
- B-side: "Have a Good One"
- Released: May 25, 1996
- Genre: Country
- Length: 3:19
- Label: MCA
- Songwriters: Bill Kenner, L. Russell Brown
- Producer: Tony Brown

Tracy Byrd singles chronology
"Heaven in My Woman's Eyes" (1996)	"4 to 1 in Atlanta" (1996)	"Big Love" (1996)

"4 to 1 in Atlanta" is a song written by Bill Kenner and L. Russell Brown, and recorded by American country music artist Tracy Byrd. It was released in May 1996 as the fourth and final single from the 1995 album Love Lessons. The song reached No. 21 on the Billboard Hot Country Singles & Tracks chart.

== Chart performance ==
Chart (1996)	Peak position
Canada Country Singles (RPM)	18
US Hot Country Songs (Billboard)	21
