= It's About Time (Tracy Byrd album) =

Studio album by Tracy Byrd
- Released: November 2, 1999
- Recorded: 1999
- Genre: Country
- Length: 40:50
- Label: RCA Nashville
- Producer: Tracy Byrd; Billy Joe Walker, Jr.

Tracy Byrd chronology
Keepers: Greatest Hits (1999)	It's About Time (1999)	Ten Rounds (2001)

Singles from It's About Time
- 1. "Put Your Hand in Mine" Released: September 13, 1999; 2. "Love, You Ain't Seen the Last of Me" Released: April 1, 2000; 3. "Take Me with You When You Go" Released: 2000

Professional ratings
Review scores
Source	Rating
Allmusic -	4/5 stars

It's About Time is the sixth studio album by American country music artist Tracy Byrd. It was his first album to be released on RCA Nashville after leaving MCA Nashville, his previous label, in 1999. The album produced the singles "Put Your Hand in Mine" (co-written by Jimmy Wayne), "Love, You Ain't Seen the Last of Me", and "Take Me with You When You Go". "Undo the Right" was originally recorded by Willie Nelson on his 1962 album And Then I Wrote.

== Track listing ==
No.	Title	Writer(s)	Length
1.	"Put Your Hand in Mine"	Skip Ewing, Jimmy Wayne	4:32
2.	"It's About Time"	Curtis Wright, Jim Collins	4:00
3.	"Can't Have One Without the Other"	Shawn Camp, Gary Scruggs	3:28
4.	"Take Me with You When You Go"	Jennifer Hanson, Mark Nesler	3:18
5.	"Every Time I Do"	Camp, Taylor Dunn	3:40
6.	"Love, You Ain't Seen the Last of Me"	Kendal Franceschi	3:31
7.	"Ain't It Just Like a Woman"	Jeffrey Steele, Al Anderson	3:22
8.	"Undo the Right"	Willie Nelson, Hank Cochran	3:00
9.	"Proud of Me"	Nesler, Tony Martin	3:51
10.	"A Little Love"	Pat Terry, Tia Sillers	3:34
11.	"Something to Brag About"	Steele, Anderson	4:28

== Personnel ==
As listed in liner notes.

- Eddie Bayers – drums, percussion
- Tracy Byrd – lead vocals
- Larry Byrom – electric guitar
- Pat Coil – synthesizer
- Larry Franklin – fiddle
- Paul Franklin – steel guitar
- Johnny Gimble – fiddle
- Aubrey Haynie – fiddle
- Wes Hightower – background vocals
- John Barlow Jarvis – piano
- Paul Leim – drums, washboard
- Bob Mason – cello
- Brent Mason – electric guitar
- Steve Nathan – synthesizer
- Matt Rollings – piano, B-3 organ, Wurlitzer
- John Wesley Ryles – background vocals
- Wayne Toups – accordion
- Billy Joe Walker, Jr. – electric guitar, acoustic guitar
- Biff Watson – acoustic guitar
- Dennis Wilson – background vocals
- Glenn Worf – bass guitar
- Curtis "Mr. Harmony" Young – background vocals
- Reggie Young – electric guitar

== Chart performance ==
Chart (1999)	Peak position
U.S. Billboard Top Country Albums	20
U.S. Billboard 200	174
