= Ten Rounds (Tracy Byrd album) =

Studio album by Tracy Byrd
- Released: July 24, 2001
- Genre: Country
- Length: 42:40
- Label: RCA Nashville
- Producer: Tracy Byrd; Billy Joe Walker, Jr.

Tracy Byrd chronology
It's About Time (1999)	Ten Rounds (2001)	The Truth About Men (2003)

Singles from Ten Rounds
- 1. "A Good Way to Get on My Bad Side" Released: March 24, 2001; 2. "Just Let Me Be in Love" Released: August 13, 2001; 3. "Ten Rounds with Jose Cuervo" Released: April 1, 2002

Professional ratings
Review scores
Source	Rating
Allmusic	4/5 stars

Ten Rounds is the seventh studio album by American country music artist Tracy Byrd. Released in 2001 as his second album for RCA Nashville, it produced the singles "A Good Way to Get on My Bad Side", "Just Let Me Be in Love", and "Ten Rounds with Jose Cuervo", which became his second Number One hit on the Billboard country charts in 2002.

The track "How Much Does the World Weigh" was previously recorded by Sammy Kershaw on his 1999 album Maybe Not Tonight, and "Wildfire" is a cover of Michael Martin Murphey's hit single. In addition, Byrd's signature song "The Keeper of the Stars" was newly recorded for this collection.

== Track listing ==
No.	Title	Writer(s)	Length
1.	"Somebody's Dream"	Casey Beathard, Michael P. Heeney	3:42
2.	"Just Let Me Be in Love"	Mark Nesler, Tom Shapiro, Tony Martin	3:48
3.	"Ten Rounds with José Cuervo"	Beathard, Heeney, Marla Cannon-Goodman	3:02
4.	"Wildfire"	Michael Martin Murphey, Larry Cansler	4:01
5.	"How Much Does the World Weigh"	Michael White, Lee Thomas Miller	3:42
6.	"Summertime Fever"	Marty Brown, Stan Webb	2:43
7.	"Crazy Every Time"	Beathard, Billy Currington, Danny Demay	3:33
8.	"A Good Way to Get on My Bad Side" (duet with Mark Chesnutt)	George Teren, Rivers Rutherford	3:35
9.	"Needed"	Neil Thrasher, Wendell Mobley	3:16
10.	"Tryin' Not to Love You"	Jeff Wood, Gary Cotton	3:17
11.	"Never Gonna Break Again"	Nesler, Martin	3:34
12.	"The Keeper of the Stars"	Karen Staley, Dickey Lee, Danny Mayo	4:21

== Personnel ==
- Eddie Bayers - drums
- Mike Brignardello - bass guitar
- Marty Brown - background vocals
- Tracy Byrd - lead vocals
- Mark Chesnutt - duet vocals on "A Good Way to Get on My Bad Side"
- Lisa Cochran - background vocals
- John Cowan - background vocals
- Eric Darken - percussion
- Jerry Douglas - dobro
- Dan Dugmore - steel guitar
- Larry Franklin - fiddle, mandolin
- Paul Franklin - steel guitar
- Kenny Greenberg - electric guitar
- Andy Griggs - background vocals
- Tony Harrell - keyboards, synthesizer strings
- Mike Haynes - trumpet
- Wes Hightower - background vocals
- John Barlow Jarvis - Hammond organ, piano, synthesizer
- Paul Leim - drums, percussion
- B. James Lowry - acoustic guitar
- Liana Manis - background vocals
- Brent Mason - electric guitar, gut string guitar
- Russ Pahl - steel guitar
- Steve Patrick - trumpet
- Tammy Pierce - background vocals
- Michael Rhodes - bass guitar
- Rivers Rutherford - acoustic guitar
- Scotty Sanders - steel guitar
- Harry Stinson - background vocals
- Billy Joe Walker Jr. - acoustic guitar, electric guitar
- Biff Watson - acoustic guitar, electric guitar, Telecaster
- Curtis Wright - background vocals

== Charts ==
=== Weekly charts ===
Chart (2001)	Peak position
US Billboard 200	119
US Top Country Albums (Billboard)	12

=== Year-end charts ===
Chart (2002)	Position
US Top Country Albums (Billboard)	52
