= Love Lessons (album) =

Studio album by Tracy Byrd
- Released: July 18, 1995
- Recorded: 1994–1995
- Genre: Country
- Length: 32:14
- Label: MCA
- Producer: Tony Brown

Tracy Byrd chronology
No Ordinary Man (1994)	Love Lessons (1995)	Big Love (1996)

Singles from Love Lessons
- 1. "Walking to Jerusalem" Released: July 25, 1995; 2. "Love Lessons" Released: August 29, 1995; 3. "Heaven in My Woman's Eyes" Released: January 1996; 4. "4 to 1 in Atlanta" Released: May 25, 1996

Professional ratings
Review scores
Source	Rating
Allmusic	link
Entertainment Weekly	B− link

Love Lessons is the third studio album by American country music artist Tracy Byrd. It produced the singles "Love Lessons," "Walking to Jerusalem," "4 to 1 in Atlanta," and "Heaven in My Woman's Eyes," all of which charted on the Billboard country music charts between 1995 and 1996. The title track was the only single of these four to reach Top Ten on that chart.

== Track listing ==
No.	Title	Writer(s)	Length
1.	"Walking to Jerusalem"	Sam Hogin, Mark D. Sanders	3:25
2.	"Love Lessons"	Jerry Kilgore, Ted Hewitt, Monty Powell, Sarah Majors	3:51
3.	"4 to 1 in Atlanta"	Bill Kenner, L. Russell Brown	3:18
4.	"Heaven in My Woman's Eyes"	Mark Nesler	3:24
5.	"Honky-Tonk Dancing Machine"	Nesler, Tracy Byrd	3:09
6.	"You Lied to Me"	Bill Anderson	2:54
7.	"Down on the Bottom"	Nesler, Byrd	3:05
8.	"Don't Need That Heartache"	Kostas, Melba Montgomery	3:09
9.	"Have a Good One"	Max D. Barnes, Paul Craft, David Kent	3:02
10.	"Walkin' In"	Byron Hill, Zack Turner	2:57

== Personnel ==
- Tracy Byrd – lead vocals
- Johnny Lee Carpenter – fiddle
- Stuart Duncan – fiddle
- Buddy Emmons – pedal steel guitar
- Paul Franklin – pedal steel guitar, pedabro
- Liana Manis – background vocals
- Brent Mason – electric guitar, gut string guitar
- Steve Nathan – piano, organ, synthesizer, Wurlitzer
- Mark Nesler – background vocals
- Mickey Raphael – harmonica
- John Wesley Ryles – background vocals
- Billy Joe Walker, Jr. – electric guitar, acoustic guitar
- Biff Watson – acoustic guitar
- Lonnie Wilson – drums, tambourine, vibraslap
- Glenn Worf – bass guitar, upright bass

== Charts ==
=== Weekly charts ===
Chart (1995)	Peak position
Canadian Country Albums (RPM)	15
US Billboard 200	44
US Top Country Albums (Billboard)	6

=== Year-end charts ===
Chart (1995)	Position
US Top Country Albums (Billboard)	59
Chart (1996)	Position
US Top Country Albums (Billboard)	48

== Certifications ==
Region	Certification	Certified units/sales
United States (RIAA)	Gold	500,000^{^}
^{^} Shipments figures based on certification alone.
