= The First Step (song) =

Single by Tracy Byrd

from the album No Ordinary Man
- B-side: "No Ordinary Man"
- Released: November 15, 1994
- Recorded: 1994
- Genre: Country
- Length: 2:24
- Label: MCA
- Songwriters: Doug Crider, Verlon Thompson
- Producer: Jerry Crutchfield

Tracy Byrd singles chronology
"Watermelon Crawl" (1994)	"The First Step" (1994)	"The Keeper of the Stars" (1995)

"The First Step" is a song written by Doug Crider and Verlon Thompson, and recorded by American country music artist Tracy Byrd. It was released in November 1994 as the third single from the album No Ordinary Man. The song reached number 5 on the Billboard Hot Country Singles & Tracks chart.

== Critical reception ==
Deborah Evans Price, of Billboard magazine reviewed the song favorably, saying that the song continues Byrd's pattern of two-step cliches, but that he manages to "inject more than enough spirit to get this one over." Price concludes that Byrd was "born to sing this stuff."

== Chart performance ==
Chart (1994–1995)	Peak position
Canada Country Singles (RPM)	4
US Hot Country Songs (Billboard)	5

=== Year-end charts ===
Chart (1995)	Position
Canada Country Tracks (RPM)	82
