= The Truth About Men (album) =

Studio album by Tracy Byrd
- Released: July 1, 2003
- Genre: Country
- Length: 37:01
- Label: RCA Nashville
- Producer: Tracy Byrd; Billy Joe Walker Jr.

Tracy Byrd chronology
Ten Rounds (2001)	The Truth About Men (2003)	Greatest Hits (2005)

Singles from The Truth About Men
- 1. "The Truth About Men" Released: March 3, 2003; 2. "Drinkin' Bone" Released: August 4, 2003; 3. "How'd I Wind Up in Jamaica" Released: 2004

Professional ratings
Review scores
Source	Rating
Allmusic	link

The Truth About Men is the eighth studio album by American country music artist Tracy Byrd. Released in 2003 as the third and final album for RCA Nashville, it features the singles "The Truth About Men", "Drinkin' Bone", and "How'd I Wind Up in Jamaica". Before its release, Byrd charted in the country top 40 with the single "Lately (Been Dreamin' 'bout Babies)", which does not appear on the album.

The track "Making Memories of Us" was later recorded by The Notorious Cherry Bombs on their self-titled debut album, and again by Keith Urban on his 2004 album Be Here. Urban's rendition of the song was a Number One hit on the country music charts in 2005.

== Track listing ==
No.	Title	Writer(s)	Length
1.	"Drinkin' Bone"	Casey Beathard, Kerry Kurt Phillips	2:10
2.	"You Feel Good"	Bob DiPiero, Tom Shapiro	3:26
3.	"How'd I Wind Up in Jamaica"	Beathard, Michael P. Heeney	3:14
4.	"Tiny Town"	Keith Stegall	3:25
5.	"The Truth About Men" (featuring Blake Shelton, Andy Griggs and Montgomery Gentry)	Paul Overstreet, Rory Feek, Tim Johnson	2:58
6.	"Making Memories of Us"	Rodney Crowell	3:44
7.	"That's What Keeps Her Getting By"	Shane Minor, Danny Wells, Bobby Huff	3:46
8.	"When You Go"	Beathard, Heeney, Marla Cannon-Goodman	3:21
9.	"Baby Put Your Clothes On"	Overstreet, Bill Anderson, Buddy Cannon	3:10
10.	"Somewhere I Wanna Go"	Shapiro, Mark Nesler, Tony Martin	3:58
11.	"Ten Rounds with José Cuervo (Live)" (Live at Far West Rodeo, El Paso, Texas)	Beathard, Heeney, Cannon-Goodman	3:40

== Personnel ==
- Tracy Byrd - lead vocals
- Billy Carpenter - drums
- Johnny Lee Carpenter - fiddle
- Britt Godwin - electric guitar
- Larry Shelton - trumpet
- Stacy Clark - trumpet
- Lisa Cochran - background vocals
- Jim Cox - piano
- Eric Darken - percussion
- Randall Dennis - piano
- Dan Dugmore - dobro, steel guitar
- Stuart Duncan - fiddle
- Paul Franklin - steel guitar
- Troy Gentry - vocals on "The Truth About Men"
- Andy Griggs - vocals on "The Truth About Men"
- Aubrey Haynie - fiddle, mandolin
- Wes Hightower - background vocals
- John Hobbs - piano
- John Barlow Jarvis - Hammond organ, piano, synthesizer
- Troy Lancaster - electric guitar
- Paul Leim - drums, percussion
- B. James Lowry - acoustic guitar
- Liana Manis - background vocals
- Jay Dee Maness - steel guitar
- Brent Mason - electric guitar
- Mark Matoska - steel guitar
- Eddie Montgomery - vocals on "The Truth About Men"
- John J. Moore - bass guitar, background vocals
- John Robinson - drums
- John Wesley Ryles - background vocals
- Blake Shelton - vocals on "The Truth About Men"
- Leland Sklar - bass guitar
- Carey Stone - electric guitar
- Michael Thompson - electric guitar
- Neil Thrasher - background vocals
- Billy Joe Walker Jr. - acoustic guitar, electric guitar
- Gabe Witcher - fiddle
- Glenn Worf - bass guitar
- Reggie Young - electric guitar

== Charts ==
=== Weekly charts ===
Chart (2003)	Peak position
US Billboard 200	33
US Top Country Albums (Billboard)	5

=== Year-end charts ===
Chart (2003)	Position
US Top Country Albums (Billboard)	54
Chart (2004)	Position
US Top Country Albums (Billboard)	66
