= No Ordinary Man =

Studio album by Tracy Byrd
- Released: June 7, 1994
- Recorded: August–October 1993
- Studio: Javalina Recording Studios, Music Mill Studios, Sound Stage Studios, Nashville, TN
- Genre: Country
- Length: 31:44
- Label: MCA
- Producer: Jerry Crutchfield

Tracy Byrd chronology
Tracy Byrd (1993)	No Ordinary Man (1994)	Love Lessons (1995)

Singles from No Ordinary Man
- 1. "Lifestyles of the Not So Rich and Famous" Released: April 26, 1994; 2. "Watermelon Crawl" Released: July 26, 1994; 3. "The First Step" Released: November 15, 1994; 4. "The Keeper of the Stars" Released: February 2, 1995

Professional ratings
Review scores
Source	Rating
Allmusic	4.5/5 stars
Chicago Tribune	2/4 stars
Entertainment Weekly	B

No Ordinary Man is the second studio album by American country music artist Tracy Byrd. It features the singles "The First Step", "Lifestyles of the Not So Rich and Famous", "Watermelon Crawl", and "The Keeper of the Stars", all of which reached the top five on the Hot Country Songs chart. As his best-selling album, it was certified 2× Platinum by the RIAA for shipments of two million copies in the U.S. Although not a number one, "The Keeper of the Stars" is considered one of Byrd's signature songs.

== Track listing ==
No.	Title	Writer(s)	Length
1.	"The First Step"	Doug Crider, Verlon Thompson	2:22
2.	"Lifestyles of the Not So Rich and Famous"	Byron Hill, Wayne Tester	2:51
3.	"No Ordinary Man"	Tracy Byrd, Frank Dycus, Lonnie Williams	3:24
4.	"Anybody Else's Heart but Mine"	Wayland Holyfield, Kent Robbins	2:55
5.	"Watermelon Crawl"	Buddy Brock, Zack Turner	3:01
6.	"The Keeper of the Stars"	Dickey Lee, Danny Mayo, Karen Staley	4:06
7.	"You Never Know Just How Good You've Got It"	Mark Nesler	3:13
8.	"Redneck Roses"	Byrd, Byron Hill	3:22
9.	"Right About Now"	Toni Daie, Joy Swinea	3:16
10.	"Pink Flamingos"	Micki Fuhrman, Wood Newton	3:14

== Personnel ==
- Eddie Bayers - drums
- Tracy Byrd - lead vocals
- Johnny Lee Carpenter - fiddle
- Pat Flynn - acoustic guitar
- Sonny Garrish - steel guitar
- Steve Gibson - acoustic guitar
- Greg Gordon - background vocals
- Mitch Humphries - piano
- David Hungate - bass guitar
- John Barlow Jarvis - synthesizer
- Brent Mason - electric guitar
- Weldon Myrick - steel guitar
- Kenny Sears - fiddle
- Dennis Wilson - background vocals
- Lonnie Wilson - drums
- Glenn Worf - bass guitar
- Curtis Young - background vocals

== Production ==
- Produced By Jerry Crutchfield
- Engineers: Craig White, Tim Kish
- Assistant Engineers: Terry Bates, Robert Charles
- Mixing: Lynn Peterzell, Craig White
- Mastering: Hank Williams

== Charts ==
=== Weekly charts ===
Chart (1994–1995)	Peak position
Canadian Country Albums (RPM)	11
US Billboard 200	30
US Top Country Albums (Billboard)	3

=== Year-end charts ===
Chart (1994)	Position
US Top Country Albums (Billboard)	64
Chart (1995)	Position
US Billboard 200	83
US Top Country Albums (Billboard)	14
Chart (1996)	Position
US Top Country Albums (Billboard)	43
