= I'm from the Country (song) =

Single by Tracy Byrd

from the album I'm from the Country
- B-side: "For Me It's You"
- Released: February 3, 1998
- Recorded: December 30, 1997
- Genre: Country
- Length: 3:30
- Label: MCA Nashville
- Songwriters: Marty Brown; Stan Webb; Richard Young
- Producer: Tony Brown

Tracy Byrd singles chronology
"Good Ol' Fashioned Love" (1997)	"I'm from the Country" (1998)	"I Wanna Feel That Way Again" (1998)

"I'm from the Country" is a song written by Marty Brown, Stan Webb and Richard Young, who is the rhythm guitarist for the band The Kentucky Headhunters, and recorded by the American country music artist Tracy Byrd. It was released in February 1998 as the first single and title track from his album I'm from the Country.

== Content ==
"I'm from the Country" is an up-tempo twelve-bar blues, backed by electric guitar and fiddle, with some Hammond organ flourishes. In it, the narrator describes the rural lifestyle that he and his peers live, saying "We know how to work and we know how to play / We're from the country and we like it that way." On the final chorus, Byrd is joined by a crowd of backing singers, many of whom begin cheering over the final guitar solo.

The song was co-written by Marty Brown (who was a former MCA recording artist) with The Kentucky Headhunters' rhythm guitarist Richard Young, and Stan Webb. Brown and The Kentucky Headhunters recorded the song's demo.

== Music video ==
The music video was directed by Michael Merriman, and premiered on CMT on February 6, 1998 during CMT's "Deliery Room". The video begins with a CD putting on the stereo, closes it, and turns the volume up. When the song begins, some guests arrive at the cabin. Byrd sings the song at the same cabin. Stock footage from "Watermelon Crawl" is also used in the video, as well as interacting with Byrd sitting on the stereo, in the kitchen with two women, and some people barbecuing on the grill. The last scene shows Byrd getting into the a hot tub by sitting on it, and blows his candle out as the video ends. In the video, Byrd was wearing a shirt saying "Mossy Oak's Hunting the Country Television Series on TNN Outdoors", referring to Byrd as the on-air spokesman.

== Critical reception ==
Thom Owens, who reviewed "I'm from the Country" for Allmusic, wrote of the song, "The key to the record's success is that he takes pains in proving the title true — and by the end of the record, you have no question that he is indeed from the country." Deborah Evans Price, of Billboard magazine reviewed the song with general favor by writing that the song is "buoyed by lots of fiddle and steel guitar riffs as well as a fun sing-along chorus". She also called it a "festive, uptempo little romp, but with his deep, resonant voice, it would be nice to hear Byrd deliver songs with a little more meat to them".

Stan Webb received the SESAC Country Song of the Year award in 1998 for co-writing the song.

== Chart performance ==
"I'm from the Country" debuted on the Billboard Hot Country Singles & Tracks (now Hot Country Songs) charts at number 57 on the week of February 14, 1998. It charted for 28 weeks, peaking at number 3. The song also spent seventeen weeks on the Billboard Hot 100 (his first entry on that chart since "Walkin' to Jerusalem" in 1995), peaking at number 63. It was a number one on the RPM country charts in Canada.

Chart (1998)	Peak position
Canada Country Singles (RPM)	1
US Billboard Hot 100	63
US Hot Country Songs (Billboard)	3

=== Year-end charts ===
Chart (1998)	Position
Canada Country Tracks (RPM)	62
US Country Songs (Billboard)	6
