= The Truth About Men (song) =

Single by Tracy Byrd featuring Montgomery Gentry, Blake Shelton, & Andy Griggs

from the album The Truth About Men
- Released: March 3, 2003
- Genre: Country
- Length: 2:59
- Label: RCA Nashville
- Songwriters: Rory Feek; Tim Johnson; Paul Overstreet
- Producer: Billy Joe Walker Jr. Tracy Byrd

Tracy Byrd singles chronology
"Lately (Been Dreamin' 'bout Babies)" (2002)	"The Truth About Men" (2003)	"Drinkin' Bone" (2003)

Montgomery Gentry singles chronology
"Speed" (2002)	"The Truth About Men" (2003)	"Hell Yeah" (2003)

Blake Shelton singles chronology
"Heavy Liftin'" (2003)	"The Truth About Men" (2003)	"Playboys of the Southwestern World" (2003)

Andy Griggs singles chronology
"Practice Life" (2002)	"The Truth About Men" (2003)	"She Thinks She Needs Me" (2004)

"The Truth About Men" is a song written by Paul Overstreet, Rory Feek and Tim Johnson, and recorded by American country music singer Tracy Byrd, featuring Montgomery Gentry, Blake Shelton, and Andy Griggs. It was released in March 2003 as the first single and title track from his album The Truth About Men. The song peaked at number 13 on the Hot Country Songs charts.

== Content ==
The song is a salute to men in various situations, such as not going out shopping, sitting with a bag full of chips watching football on TV, coming over at halftime, and looking at him in the eye with a big fat lie. In the song's second verse, Byrd mentions about movies such as "Steel Magnolias", the "Rambo" franchise, and "Die Hard 4". Montgomery Gentry explains about the new tools that jump up and down like fools at The Home Depot, Andy Griggs explains about how men should not take out to dinner at the restaurant, and Blake Shelton explains that the reason we do 'cause we know it leads to the one thing that we all want.

== Critical reception ==
Ray Waddell of Billboard magazine described the song as "hilarious" in his review of the album. Reviewing the album for Allmusic, Stephen Thomas Erlewine called the song "a little too silly" and said that "some of the jibes don't quite work".

== Music video ==
The music video was filmed on April 8, 2003, in Nashville, Tennessee, and was directed by Thom Oliphant. The video premiered on CMT on May 14, 2003.

== Chart performance ==
"The Truth About Men" debuted on the Hot Country Songs charts for the week ending March 15, 2003. It spent 21 weeks on the charts and peaked at number 13. It also peaked at number 77 on the Billboard Hot 100. Before its release, Byrd charted at number 38 on Hot Country Songs with a cut titled "Lately (Been Dreamin' 'bout Babies)", which did not appear on any of his albums.

Chart (2003)	Peak position
US Billboard Hot 100	77
US Hot Country Songs (Billboard)	13

=== Year-end charts ===
Chart (2003)	Position
US Country Songs (Billboard)	46
