= The Keeper of the Stars =

Single by Tracy Byrd

from the album No Ordinary Man
- B-side: "Pink Flamingos"
- Released: February 2, 1995
- Genre: Country
- Length: 4:06 (album version) 4:17 (radio version)
- Label: MCA
- Songwriters: Dickey Lee; Danny Mayo; Karen Staley
- Producer: Jerry Crutchfield

Tracy Byrd singles chronology
"The First Step" (1994)	"The Keeper of the Stars" (1995)	"Walking to Jerusalem" (1995)

"The Keeper of the Stars" is a song written by Dickey Lee, Danny Mayo and Karen Staley, and recorded by American country music artist Tracy Byrd. It was released in February 1995 as the fourth and last single from his album No Ordinary Man, it went on to reach a peak of #2 on the Billboard Hot Country Singles & Tracks (now Hot Country Songs) charts, behind "I Can Love You Like That" by John Michael Montgomery. A year after its release, it was nominated for Song of the Year at the Academy of Country Music.

== Content ==
The song is a ballad in which the singer addresses his lover, telling her that a third party must have been responsible for bringing them together. Specifically, that third party is defined as being "the keeper of the stars" (i.e., God).

== Re-recordings ==
A different recording of the song, one semitone lower than the album version, was released as the radio edit. This re-recording was made because Byrd felt that he sang it better in a lower key, and sang it as such while performing in concert. The radio edit was also used in the song's music video, which was directed by Michael Merriman, and premiered in early 1995.

Byrd re-recorded the song again in 2001 for his album Ten Rounds, and that particular re-recording was reprised on his 2005 Greatest Hits package.

== Chart performance ==
Initially, Byrd's label (MCA Records) had not planned for "The Keeper of the Stars" to be a single, until his publicist realized that the song had been receiving positive feedback for it in concert. The fourth single from Byrd's No Ordinary Man album, "The Keeper of the Stars" spent 20 weeks on the Billboard Hot Country Singles & Tracks (now Hot Country Songs) charts, reaching a peak position of number two.

Chart (1995)	Peak position
Canada Country Singles (RPM)	5
US Billboard Hot 100	68
US Hot Country Songs (Billboard)	2

=== Year-end charts ===
Chart (1995)	Position
Canada Country Tracks (RPM)	98
US Country Songs (Billboard)	53
