= Drinkin' Bone =

Single by Tracy Byrd

from the album The Truth About Men
- Released: August 4, 2003
- Recorded: 2003
- Genre: Country
- Length: 2:10
- Label: RCA Nashville
- Songwriters: Casey Beathard; Kerry Kurt Phillips
- Producers: Tracy Byrd; Billy Joe Walker Jr.

Tracy Byrd singles chronology
"The Truth About Men" (2003)	"Drinkin' Bone" (2003)	"How'd I Wind Up in Jamaica" (2004)

"Drinkin' Bone" is a song written by Casey Beathard and Kerry Kurt Phillips, and recorded by American country music artist Tracy Byrd. It was released in August 2003 as the second single from his album The Truth About Men. It peaked at No. 7 on the United States Billboard Hot Country Singles & Tracks chart, and is his last Top 10 hit to date. It also peaked at No. 60 on the U.S. Billboard Hot 100.

== Critical reception ==
Chuck Taylor, of Billboard magazine reviewed the song favorably by calling it "an easy sing-along" and saying that Byrd "packs a lot of good-natured personality in his delivery".

== Chart positions ==
"Drinkin' Bone" debuted at number 55 on the U.S. Billboard Hot Country Singles & Tracks for the week of August 9, 2003.

Chart (2003–2004)	Peak position
US Hot Country Songs (Billboard)	7
US Billboard Hot 100	60

=== Year-end charts ===
Chart (2004)	Position
US Country Songs (Billboard)	59
