= Lifestyles of the Not So Rich and Famous =

Single by Tracy Byrd

from the album No Ordinary Man
- B-side: "You Never Know Just How Good You've Got It"
- Released: April 26, 1994
- Recorded: 1993–1994
- Genre: Country
- Length: 2:51
- Label: MCA
- Songwriters: Byron Hill; Wayne Tester
- Producer: Jerry Crutchfield

Tracy Byrd singles chronology
"Why Don't That Telephone Ring" (1993)	"Lifestyles of the Not So Rich and Famous" (1994)	"Watermelon Crawl" (1994)

"Lifestyles of the Not So Rich and Famous" is a song written by Byron Hill and Wayne Tester, and recorded by American country music artist Tracy Byrd. It was released in April 1994 as the first single from the album No Ordinary Man. The song won an ASCAP Award for being among the most performed country songs of 1994.

== Critical reception ==
Larry Flick, of Billboard magazine reviewed the song favorably, saying that the song is "chock full of hilarious white trash-isms" and calls it Byrd's best single so far.

== Chart positions ==
Chart (1994)	Peak position
Canada Country Singles (RPM)	4
US Bubbling Under Hot 100 (Billboard)	15
US Hot Country Songs (Billboard)	4

=== Year-end charts ===
Chart (1994)	Position
Canada Country Tracks (RPM)	56
US Country Songs (Billboard)	52
