= She's All I Got =

1971 single by Freddie North

- US single of North's recording

Single by Freddie North

from the album Friend
- B-side: "Ain't Nothing in the News (But the Blues)"
- Released: July 1971
- Recorded: 1970
- Studio: Quinby Studios, Sheffield, Alabama
- Genre: Country
- Length: 2:45
- Label: Mankind
- Songwriters: Gary U.S. Bonds, Jerry Williams Jr.
- Producer: Jerry Williams Jr.

Freddie North singles chronology
"She's All I Got" (1971)	"You and Me (Together Forever)" (1971)

"She's All I Got" is a song written by Gary U.S. Bonds and Jerry Williams Jr. It has been recorded by several artists. The first version, released in 1971 by Freddie North, was a Top 40 U.S. pop hit, and a version by Johnny Paycheck was a number 2 U.S. country hit that same year. A second country music version was released on Conway Twitty's 1972 Decca LP I Can't See Me Without You. There was also a version titled "He's All I Got" that was on Tanya Tucker's 1972 album Delta Dawn. Yet another cover titled "Don't Take Her She's All I've Got" was released by Tracy Byrd, whose version reached number 4 on the U.S. and Canadian country singles charts. Co-author Jerry Williams Jr., a.k.a. Swamp Dogg, released his own version on his 2020 album Sorry You Couldn’t Make It.

== Content ==
In the song, the male narrator pleads to someone else not to take away his lover.

== Freddie North version ==
Freddie North was the first artist to record the song, doing so on his album Friend. The only single from this album, it peaked at number 39 on the Billboard Hot 100 and number 10 on the Soul Singles chart in the US. It was the only chart single of North's career.

=== Chart positions ===
Chart (1971)	Peak position
US Billboard Hot 100	39
U.S. Billboard Best Selling Soul Singles	10
U.S. Cash Box Top 100	30

== Johnny Paycheck version ==
"She's All I Got"
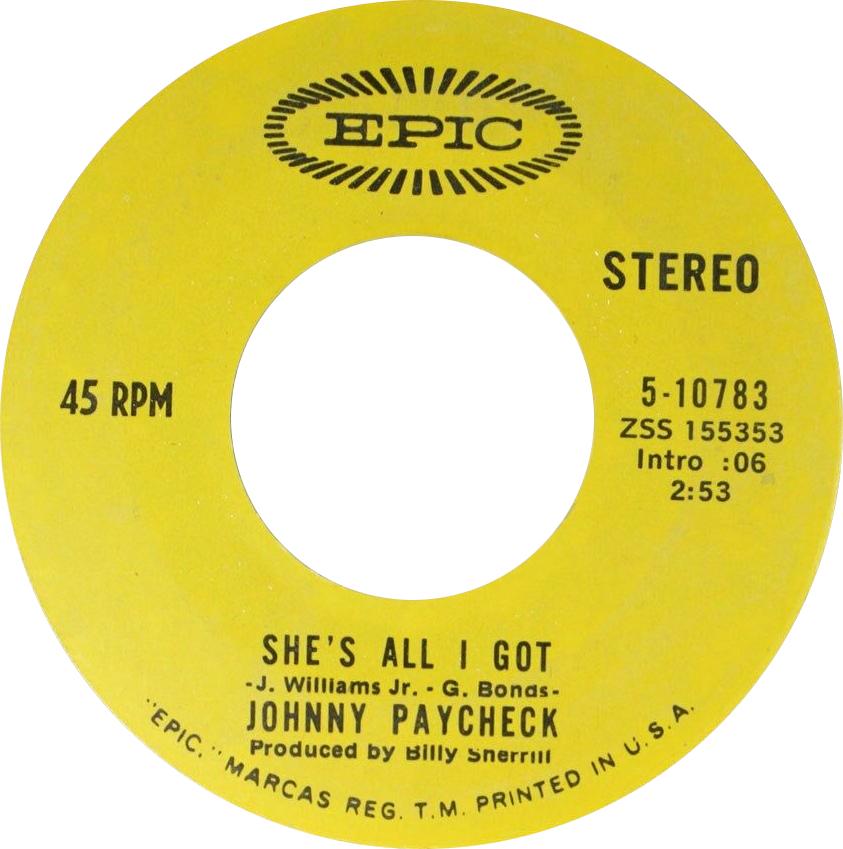
- US single of Paycheck's recording

Single by Johnny Paycheck

from the album She's All I Got
- B-side: "You Touched My Life"
- Released: October 9, 1971
- Recorded: August 4, 1971
- Studio: Columbia Recording Studio, Studio B, 34 Music Sq. East, Nashville, TN
- Genre: Country
- Length: 2:54
- Label: Epic
- Songwriters: Gary U.S. Bonds, Jerry Williams, Jr.
- Producer: Billy Sherrill

Johnny Paycheck singles chronology
"Wildfire" (1971)	"She's All I Got" (1971)	"Someone to Give My Love To" (1971)

Johnny Paycheck's version was released in October 1971 from his album of the same name. The song spent nineteen weeks on the Billboard Hot Country Singles Chart, reaching a peak of number 2. It was also a number 91 single on the Billboard Hot 100, his only entry there.

=== Chart positions ===
Chart (1971)	Peak position
US Hot Country Songs (Billboard)	2
US Billboard Hot 100	91
Canadian RPM Country Tracks	2

== Tracy Byrd version ==
"Don't Take Her She's All I Got"

Single by Tracy Byrd

from the album Big Love
- B-side: "I Love You, That's All"
- Released: January 27, 1997
- Genre: Country
- Length: 3:26
- Label: MCA Nashville
- Songwriters: Gary U.S. Bonds, Jerry Williams Jr.
- Producer: Tony Brown

Tracy Byrd singles chronology
"Big Love" (1996)	"Don't Take Her She's All I Got" (1997)	"Don't Love Make a Diamond Shine" (1997)

Tracy Byrd's version, retitled "Don't Take Her She's All I Got", is the second single released from his 1996 album Big Love. It peaked at number 4 on both the U.S. and Canadian country singles charts in 1997. It was Byrd's second charting cover of a Paycheck hit, after "Someone To Give My Love To" in 1993.

=== Critical reception ===
The single received a positive review in Billboard which praised Byrd's vocal similarities to Paycheck, and said that "Longtime fans will love hearing it again, and younger listeners will welcome Byrd's introducing them to this country classic."

=== Chart positions ===
Chart (1997)	Peak position
Canada Country Singles (RPM)	4
US Hot Country Songs (Billboard)	4

==== Year-end charts ====
Chart (1997)	Position
Canada Country Tracks (RPM)	48
US Country Songs (Billboard)	37
