= Redneck Games =

American annual athletic competition

- Status: Inactive
- Locations: East Dublin, Georgia, United States
- Founded: 1996
- Most recent: 2023

"Redneck Games" is also the name of a duet song by comedian Jeff Foxworthy and country music singer Alan Jackson.

The Redneck Games are held annually in East Dublin, Georgia. The games were started by Mac Davis, a local person who was the general manager of radio station WQZY-FM "Y96". Some American media reacted to the news that Atlanta had won the bid to host the 1996 Olympic Games by saying the event would be organized by a group of rednecks. The games were created to help children's needs. Around 5,000 people turned out for the first Redneck Summer Games – over twice the population of East Dublin. Events include Mud Pit Belly Flop, Bobbin' for Pig's Feet, Redneck Horseshoes, Hubcap Hurl and the Armpit Serenade.

The games received coverage from Good Morning America, Life, Maxim, MTV Road Rules/Real World Challenge, The Tonight Show, ABC, NBC, CBS, BBC, and Fox.

Due to declining revenue and attendance, the Redneck Games were canceled in 2013. The site of the games, Buckeye Park, was under scrutiny from the Georgia Environmental Protection Division for bacterial contamination of a nearby creek and the Oconee River, but city officials asserted that the games' cancellation was not for this reason.

The games returned in September 2023 under the name "Redneckin' 4 Jesus".

== Events ==
Some events that were held during the Redneck Games included:

- The cigarette flip
- Bobbing for pig's feet
- Seed spitting
- Toilet seat throwing
- Mud pit belly flop
- Big-hair contest
- Wet T-shirt contest
- Armpit serenade
- Bug zapping by spitball
- Dumpster diving
- Hubcap hurling

For each of the events, a trophy was awarded; a half-crushed, empty mounted beer can.

== Redneck Games elsewhere ==
In 2001, Drew Scott of Wild Country 96.5 "borrowed" the games to set up a fundraising event for the Franklin County NY Make-A-Wish Foundation. Each year, these games have increased in size of the event, crowds and monies raised for the Make-A-Wish Foundation. In 2010, marking the ninth year of the Annual Redneck Games in Malone, New York, the entertainment was Cledus T. Judd.

The games became so popular that they spread to Canada. Minto Canadian Redneck Games had taken place in Minto, Ontario, since 2006. Events included Mud Pit Slip & Slide, Bobbin' for Pig's Feet, Mud Pit Tug-of-War, Mud Pit Belly Flop Contest, Redneck Horseshoes, Hubcap Hurl, and Mud Pit Volleyball.

== Sources ==
- Ripley's Believe it or Not (2005). Planet Eccentric. Ripley Publishing. ISBN 978-1-893951-10-5
- Summer Redneck Games (Official Website)
