= Holdin' Heaven =

Single by Tracy Byrd

from the album Tracy Byrd
- B-side: "Edge of a Memory"
- Released: May 18, 1993
- Recorded: 1992
- Genre: Country
- Length: 2:31
- Label: MCA
- Songwriters: Bill Kenner; Thom McHugh
- Producer: Tony Brown

Tracy Byrd singles chronology
"Someone to Give My Love To" (1993)	"Holdin' Heaven" (1993)	"Why Don't That Telephone Ring" (1993)

"Holdin' Heaven" is a song written by Bill Kenner and Thom McHugh, and recorded by American country music artist Tracy Byrd that reached the top of the Billboard Hot Country Songs chart, giving Byrd his first Number One single. It was released in May 1993 as the third single from his self-titled debut album.

== Critical reception ==
Larry Flick, of Billboard magazine reviewed the song by calling it "a brassy, hard-driving rhythm and a tale of monumentally lucking out."

== Music video ==
The music video takes place at a Wild West Rodeo. It was directed by Gerry Wenner.

== Chart performance ==
The song debuted at number 72 on the Hot Country Singles & Tracks chart dated June 19, 1993. It climbed to Number One in September 1993, holding the top spot for one week. In addition, this was Byrd's first Billboard Number One, and his only Number One single until mid-2002, when he topped the charts again with "Ten Rounds with José Cuervo".

=== Charts ===
Chart (1993)	Peak position
Canada Country Singles (RPM)	3
US Hot Country Songs (Billboard)	1

=== Year-end charts ===
Chart (1993)	Position
Canada Country Tracks (RPM)	66
US Country Songs (Billboard)	16
