= Heaven in My Woman's Eyes =

Single by Tracy Byrd

from the album Love Lessons
- B-side: "Walking In"
- Released: January 27, 1996
- Genre: Country
- Length: 3:24
- Label: MCA
- Songwriter: Mark Nesler
- Producer: Tony Brown

Tracy Byrd singles chronology
| "Love Lessons" (1995) | "Heaven in My Woman's Eyes" (1996) | "4 to 1 in Atlanta" (1996) |

"Heaven in My Woman's Eyes" is a song written by Mark Nesler, and recorded by American country music artist Tracy Byrd. It was released in January 1996 as the third single from his album Love Lessons. The song reached number 14 on the Billboard Hot Country Singles & Tracks chart in April 1996.

== Chart performance ==
| Chart (1996) | Peak position |
|---|---|
| Canada Country Singles (RPM) | 34 |
| US Hot Country Songs (Billboard) | 14 |
