= Tracy Byrd (album) =

Studio album by Tracy Byrd
- Released: April 27, 1993
- Recorded: 1992–1993
- Studio: Cayman Moon Recorders, Berry Hill, TN, Emerald Sound Studios, Music Mill Studios, Nashville, TN
- Genre: Country
- Length: 29:52
- Label: MCA
- Producer: Keith Stegall (tracks 1, 2, 5, 7–10); Tony Brown (tracks 3, 4, 6)

Tracy Byrd chronology
Tracy Byrd (1993)	No Ordinary Man (1994)

Singles from Tracy Byrd
- 1. "That's the Thing About a Memory" Released: July 13, 1992; 2. "Someone to Give My Love To" Released: January 26, 1993; 3. "Holdin' Heaven" Released: May 18, 1993; 4. "Why Don't That Telephone Ring" Released: October 30, 1993

Professional ratings
Review scores
Source	Rating
AllMusic	3/5 stars
Chicago Tribune	3.5/4 stars
Entertainment Weekly	C

Tracy Byrd is the debut studio album by American country music artist Tracy Byrd. In order of release, the singles from this album were "That's the Thing About a Memory", "Someone to Give My Love To" (a cover of Johnny Paycheck's song), "Holdin' Heaven", and "Why Don't That Telephone Ring". "Holdin' Heaven" reached Number One on the Hot Country Songs charts in 1993.

"An Out of Control Raging Fire" would later be recorded by Patty Loveless (as a duet with Travis Tritt) on Loveless's Mountain Soul album. "Talk to Me Texas" was previously recorded by Keith Whitley for his 1989 posthumously-released album I Wonder Do You Think of Me.

== Track listing ==
No.	Title	Writer(s)	Length
1.	"That's the Thing About a Memory"	Keith Stegall, Tracy Byrd, Lewis Anderson	2:46
2.	"Back in the Swing of Things"	Buddy Cannon, Vern Gosdin, Dean Dillon	2:30
3.	"Someone to Give My Love To"	Jerry Foster, Bill Rice	3:23
4.	"Holdin' Heaven"	Bill Kenner, Thom McHugh	2:31
5.	"Why"	Larry Bastian, DeWayne Blackwell, Earl Bud Lee	2:58
6.	"An Out of Control Raging Fire" (duet with Dawn Sears)	Kostas, Melba Montgomery	3:40
7.	"Hat Trick"	Jim Weatherly, Glenn Sutton	2:37
8.	"Why Don't That Telephone Ring"	Charles Quillen, Ron Hellard	3:16
9.	"Edge of a Memory"	Paul Nelson, Tom Shapiro	3:05
10.	"Talk to Me Texas"	Don Cook, Bucky Jones, Curly Putman	3:01

== Personnel ==
=== Tracks 1, 2, 5, 7–10 ===
- Eddie Bayers – drums
- Bruce Bouton – pedal steel guitar
- Tracy Byrd – lead vocals
- Stuart Duncan – fiddle
- Roy Huskey, Jr. – acoustic bass
- Brent Mason – electric guitar
- Tim Mensy – acoustic guitar
- Weldon Myrick – pedal steel guitar
- Hargus "Pig" Robbins – piano
- Jerry Salley – background vocals
- Dennis Wilson – background vocals
- Glenn Worf – bass guitar
- Curtis Young – background vocals
- Andrea Zonn – background vocals

=== Tracks 3, 4, 6 ===
- Bruce Bouton – pedal steel guitar
- Larry Byrom – electric guitar
- Glen Duncan – fiddle
- Pat Flynn – acoustic guitar
- Owen Hale – drums
- David Hungate – bass guitar
- Randy McCormick – keyboards, piano
- Dawn Sears – duet vocals on track 6

== Chart performance ==
Chart (1993)	Peak position
U.S. Billboard Top Country Albums	24
U.S. Billboard 200	115
U.S. Billboard Top Heatseekers	3
