= Big Love (Tracy Byrd album) =

Studio album by Tracy Byrd
- Released: October 22, 1996
- Recorded: 1996
- Genre: Country
- Length: 32:09
- Label: MCA
- Producer: Tony Brown

Tracy Byrd chronology
Love Lessons (1995)	Big Love (1996)	I'm from the Country (1998)

Singles from Big Love
- 1. "Big Love" Released: September 24, 1996; 2. "Don't Take Her She's All I Got" Released: January 27, 1997; 3. "Don't Love Make a Diamond Shine" Released: May 17, 1997; 4. "Good Ol' Fashioned Love" Released: 1997

Professional ratings
Review scores
Source	Rating
Allmusic	link
Chicago Tribune	link
Entertainment Weekly	B link

Big Love is the fourth studio album by American country music artist Tracy Byrd. The album was released in 1996 on MCA Records and contains four singles: the title track, a cover of Johnny Paycheck's "(Don't Take Her) She's All I Got", "Don't Love Make a Diamond Shine", and "Good Ol' Fashioned Love". These first two singles both reached the Top 5 on the Billboard Hot Country Singles & Tracks (now Hot Country Songs) charts, and "Don't Love Make a Diamond Shine" was a Top 20; "Good Ol' Fashioned Love", however, missed the Top 40.

== Track listing ==
No.	Title	Writer(s)	Length
1.	"Big Love"	Michael Clark, Jeff Stevens	3:39
2.	"Cowgirl"	Harley Allen, Shawn Camp	2:47
3.	"Good Ol' Fashioned Love"	Mark Nesler, Tony Martin	2:59
4.	"Don't Take Her She's All I Got"	Gary U.S. Bonds, Jerry Williams	3:26
5.	"If I Stay"	Dean Dillon, Larry Bastian	3:09
6.	"Don't Love Make a Diamond Shine"	Craig Wiseman, Mike Dekle	3:19
7.	"Tucson Too Soon"	Nesler, Tracy Byrd	3:21
8.	"I Don't Believe That's How You Feel"	Kostas, Harlan Howard	2:46
9.	"Driving Me out of Your Mind"	Nesler	3:17
10.	"I Love You, That's All"	Chris Crawford, Tom Kimmel	3:26

== Personnel ==
- Tracy Byrd – lead vocals
- Vinnie Ciesielski – trumpet on "I Don't Believe That's How You Feel"
- Stuart Duncan – fiddle, mandolin
- Thom Flora – background vocals
- Paul Franklin – steel guitar
- Vince Gill – background vocals
- Brent Mason – electric guitar, acoustic guitar
- Steve Patrick – trumpet on "I Don't Believe That's How You Feel"
- Michael Rhodes – bass guitar
- Matt Rollings – piano, B3 organ
- Harry Stinson – background vocals
- John Wesley Ryles – background vocals
- Biff Watson – acoustic guitar
- Billy Joe Walker, Jr. – electric guitar, acoustic guitar
- Lonnie Wilson – drums

== Chart performance ==
Chart (1996)	Peak position
U.S. Billboard Top Country Albums	12
U.S. Billboard 200	106
Canadian RPM Country Albums	18
