= Put Your Hand in Mine =

Single by Tracy Byrd

from the album It's About Time
- B-side: "It's About Time"
- Released: September 13, 1999
- Genre: Country
- Length: 4:32
- Label: RCA Nashville
- Songwriters: Skip Ewing, Jimmy Wayne Barber
- Producers: Tracy Byrd, Billy Joe Walker, Jr.

Tracy Byrd singles chronology
"When Mama Ain't Happy" (1999)	"Put Your Hand in Mine" (1999)	"Love, You Ain't Seen the Last of Me" (2000)

"Put Your Hand in Mine" is a song written by Skip Ewing and Jimmy Wayne (under his birth name, Jimmy Wayne Barber), and recorded by American country music singer Tracy Byrd. It was released in September 1999 as the first single from his album It's About Time. It peaked at number 11 on the Hot Country Singles & Tracks (now Hot Country Songs) chart.

== Content ==
The song is a ballad mostly accompanied by piano. In the first verse, the narrator packs all of his stuff to leave his wife. His son gives him a drawing of his hand and a refrigerator magnet, and tells him that if he needs him, the father can put his hand in his son's.

In the second verse of the song, the narrator drives past a church. After looking at his son's drawing, he goes into the church to pray. In the third verse, the narrator says that he was unable to sleep because he is thinking about her. He then tells her, "If you're not too tired / And it's not too late / Put your hand in mine".

== Chart positions ==
"Put Your Hand in Mine" spent twenty-five weeks on the Hot Country Singles & Tracks charts, peaking at number 11 in early 2000. It also served as the b-side to the album's second single, "Love, You Ain't Seen the Last of Me," as well as the b-side of Byrd's 2001 single "A Good Way to Get on My Bad Side."

Chart (1999–2000)	Peak position
Canada Country Singles (RPM)	25
US Billboard Hot 100	76
US Hot Country Songs (Billboard)	11

=== Year-end charts ===
Chart (2000)	Position
US Country Songs (Billboard)	56
