= Big Love (Tracy Byrd song) =

Single by Tracy Byrd

from the album Big Love
- B-side: "Big Love" (Club Mix)
- Released: September 24, 1996
- Recorded: 1996
- Genre: Country
- Length: 3:39
- Label: MCA Nashville
- Songwriters: Michael Clark; Jeff Stevens
- Producer: Tony Brown

Tracy Byrd singles chronology
"4 to 1 in Atlanta" (1996)	"Big Love" (1996)	"Don't Take Her She's All I Got" (1997)

"Big Love" is a song written by Jeff Stevens and Michael Clark, and recorded by American country music artist Tracy Byrd. It was released in September 1996 as the lead-off single and title track from his album of the same name. It peaked at number 3 in the United States, and number 5 in Canada. The song was previously recorded in 1994 by Chris LeDoux from his album Haywire, and released as the b-side to his single "Dallas Days and Fort Worth Nights."

== Critical reception ==
Larry Flick, of Billboard magazine reviewed the song favorable by saying that "the groove-oriented introduction of this song kicks off its big-sounding production, and Byrd's voice delivers the lyric with buoyant enthusiasm. He also stated that the song shows that Byrd is delivering radio-ready material that will fare well on the radio.

== Music video ==
The music video was directed by Gerry Wenner and was filmed in Denver, Colorado, Winter Park, Colorado and just east of Winter Park on west Rollins Pass.

== Chart positions ==
Chart (1996–1997)	Peak position
Canada Country Singles (RPM)	5
US Hot Country Songs (Billboard)	3

=== Year-end charts ===
Chart (1997)	Position
Canada Country Tracks (RPM)	69
