= Marty Brown (singer) =

American singer-songwriter

- Birth name: Dennis Martin Brown
- Born: July 25, 1965 (age 60) Maceo, Kentucky, United States
- Origin: Maceo, Kentucky, United States
- Genres: Country
- Occupation: Singer-songwriter
- Instrument(s): Vocals rhythm guitar
- Years active: 1991–1996, 2013–present
- Labels: MCA; HighTone; Plowboy Records
- Website: http://www.martybrownmusic.com

Dennis Martin Brown (born July 25, 1965) is an American country music artist. Active between 1991 and 1996, he has released six studio albums and has charted one single on the Billboard Hot Country Songs charts. Marty Brown and his wife, Shellie, currently reside in Simpson County, Franklin, Kentucky, since July 2004.

== Career ==
Brown's first recording contract was with MCA Records in 1991. While on that label, he recorded three studio albums: 1991's High and Dry, 1993's Wild Kentucky Skies, and 1994's Cryin', Lovin', Leavin'. Although all three of these albums received critical acclaim for his neotraditionalist country style and solid songwriting, none of them produced any major hits. His fourth studio album, Here's to the Honky Tonks, was released in 1996 on HighTone Records. He also co-wrote Tracy Byrd's "I'm from the Country", Perfect Stranger's "The Hits", Trace Adkins' "When I Stop Loving You", Brooks & Dunn' "It Ain't Me If It Ain't You", and William Michael Morgan' "I Pulled a Hank".

Brown was a contestant on season eight of America's Got Talent and advanced as far as the semi-final rounds. After competing on America's Got Talent, he signed a record deal with Independent Label, Dreamlined Entertainment. His new single, Make You Feel My Love, was available for download on February 5, 2016. Brown is currently signed to Plowboy Records in Nashville. Brown released his first studio album in 25 years, American Highway on May 17, 2019. Marty Brown's music career is currently on display at the Kentucky Music Hall of Fame in Mt. Vernon, Kentucky.

== Discography ==
=== Albums ===
Title	Album details	Peak chart positions	
Title	Album details	US Country	US Heat
High & Dry	Release date: August 20, 1991; Label: MCA Records	44	17
Wild Kentucky Skies	Release date: March 16, 1993; Label: MCA Records	—	—
Cryin', Lovin', Leavin'	Release date: April 26, 1994; Label: MCA Records	—	—
Here's to the Honky Tonks	Release date: September 17, 1996; Label: HighTone Records	—	—
Country Strong	Release date: 2013; Label: self-released	—	—
American Highway	Release date: May 17, 2019; Label: Plowboy Records	—	—

=== Singles ===
Year	Single	Peak chart positions		Album
Year	Single	US Country	CAN Country	Album
1991	"Every Now and Then"	—	—	High & Dry
1991	"High and Dry"	—	—	High & Dry
1991	"Wildest Dreams"	—	—	High & Dry
1993	"It Must Be the Rain"	74	62	Wild Kentucky Skies
1993	"I Don't Want to See You Again"	—	—	Wild Kentucky Skies
1994	"Cryin', Lovin', Leavin'"	—	—	Cryin', Lovin', Leavin'
1994	"You Must Be Mistakin' Me"	—	—	Cryin', Lovin', Leavin'
1996	"You Can't Wrap Your Arms Around a Memory"	—	—	Here's to the Honky Tonks
2013	"Whatever Makes You Smile"	—	—	Country Strong
2016	"Make You Feel My Love"	—	—	single only
2019	"Umbrella Lovers"	—	—	American Highway
"—" denotes releases that did not chart

=== Music videos ===
Year	Video	Director
1991	"Every Now and Then"	John Lloyd Miller
1991	"High and Dry"	John Lloyd Miller
1992	"Wildest Dreams"	Marc Ball
1993	"It Must Be the Rain"	John Lloyd Miller
1994	"Cryin', Lovin', Leavin'"	John Lloyd Miller
1994	"You Must Be Mistakin' Me"	John Lloyd Miller
1996	"You Can't Wrap Your Arms Around a Memory"	John Lloyd Miller
2012	"Put Your Love Right Here"	
2013	"Whatever Makes You Smile"	
2014	"God's Dance Floor"	
2015	"Gonna Make It Fly"	
2019	"Umbrella Lovers"	
