= Ten Rounds with Jose Cuervo =

"Ten Rounds with José Cuervo"

Single by Tracy Byrd

from the album Ten Rounds
- B-side: "Somebody's Dream"
- Released: April 1, 2002
- Genre: Novelty; Tex-Mex
- Length: 3:02
- Label: RCA Nashville
- Songwriters: Casey Beathard; Michael P. Heeney; Marla Cannon-Goodman
- Producers: Tracy Byrd; Billy Joe Walker Jr.

Tracy Byrd singles chronology
"Just Let Me Be in Love" (2001)	"Ten Rounds with José Cuervo" (2002)	"Lately (Been Dreamin' 'Bout Babies)" (2002)

"Ten Rounds with José Cuervo" is a song recorded by American country music artist Tracy Byrd. Released in April 2002, it was the third single from Byrd's Ten Rounds album. The song reached number one on the Billboard Hot Country Singles & Tracks (now Hot Country Songs) charts. It also peaked at number 26 on the Billboard Hot 100 making it Byrd's highest peaking song on that chart. It was written by Casey Beathard, Michael P. Heeney and Marla Cannon-Goodman.

== Content ==
The song is an uptempo in which the narrator discusses going to a bar to forget his ex who broke up with him. He then starts drinking many rounds of the Mexican tequila, José Cuervo. After he counts off each round, he states something crazy he does and eventually he forgets what round he is drinking and begins counting again.

The song had also been cut by Garth Brooks, who planned to include it on his 2001 album Scarecrow. According to Byrd, he called Brooks after learning that Brooks had also recorded the song. "I called Garth and he said that he had been told if it wasn't my first single, it was not gonna be a single and I said, 'Well, it's gonna be a single and I really, really am counting on this thing as a hit.' I said, 'I named the album after it.' And he was cool he said, 'Man, I wish you luck with it,' he said, 'Do well, you had it first and I love the song, I think it's a smash and good luck with it.'"

== Critical reception ==
Deborah Evans Price, of Billboard magazine reviewed the song favorably saying that Byrd "offers the kind of vocal authority that makes the whole package ring." She also describes the song as "a heck of a lot of fun." Kevin John Coyne praised the song's Tex-Mex musical arrangement and self-depreciating humor but criticized its continuance of affiliating Byrd with country novelty songs.

== Chart performance ==
"Ten Rounds with José Cuervo" debuted at number 59 on the U.S. Billboard Hot Country Singles & Tracks for the week of April 6, 2002. The song is Byrd's second and last number-one on the U.S. country charts, and his first since "Holdin' Heaven" in September 1993.

Chart (2002)	Peak Position
US Hot Country Songs (Billboard)	1
US Billboard Hot 100	26

=== Year-end charts ===
Chart (2002)	Position
US Country Songs (Billboard)	11
