= Watermelon Crawl =

Single by Tracy Byrd

from the album No Ordinary Man
- B-side: "You Never Know Just How Good You've Got It"
- Released: July 16, 1994
- Recorded: 1994
- Genre: Country
- Length: 3:01
- Label: MCA
- Songwriters: Buddy Brock; Zack Turner
- Producer: Jerry Crutchfield

Tracy Byrd singles chronology
"Lifestyles of the Not So Rich and Famous" (1994)	"Watermelon Crawl" (1994)	"The First Step" (1994)

"Watermelon Crawl" is a song written by Buddy Brock and Zack Turner, and recorded by American country music artist Tracy Byrd. It was released in July 1994, as the second single from his album No Ordinary Man. The song peaked at No. 4 on the Billboard Hot Country Singles & Tracks chart and No. 8 in Canada. It also peaked at No. 81 on the U.S. Billboard Hot 100.

== Content ==
The song chronicles the adventure of the narrator in the fictional location of Rind County, Georgia, where a watermelon festival is taking place. The featured item at this festival is red wine made from the watermelons grown in the area. The mayor urges people to abide by the law and asks them not to drive if they have been drinking; instead, they should do a dance called "The Watermelon Crawl."

== Music video ==
The music video was directed by Michael Merriman and features Byrd and his mates getting off of his tour bus in the Georgia town for the watermelon festival. Scenes also feature Byrd singing the song and dancing with people. The video was shot in McEwen, Tennessee, at the Irish Picnic Fairgrounds and not in Georgia.

== Chart positions ==
Chart (1994)	Peak position
Canada Country Singles (RPM)	8
US Billboard Hot 100	81
US Hot Country Songs (Billboard)	4

=== Year-end charts ===
Chart (1994)	Position
US Country Songs (Billboard)	75
