= Tracy Byrd =

American country music singer (born 1966)

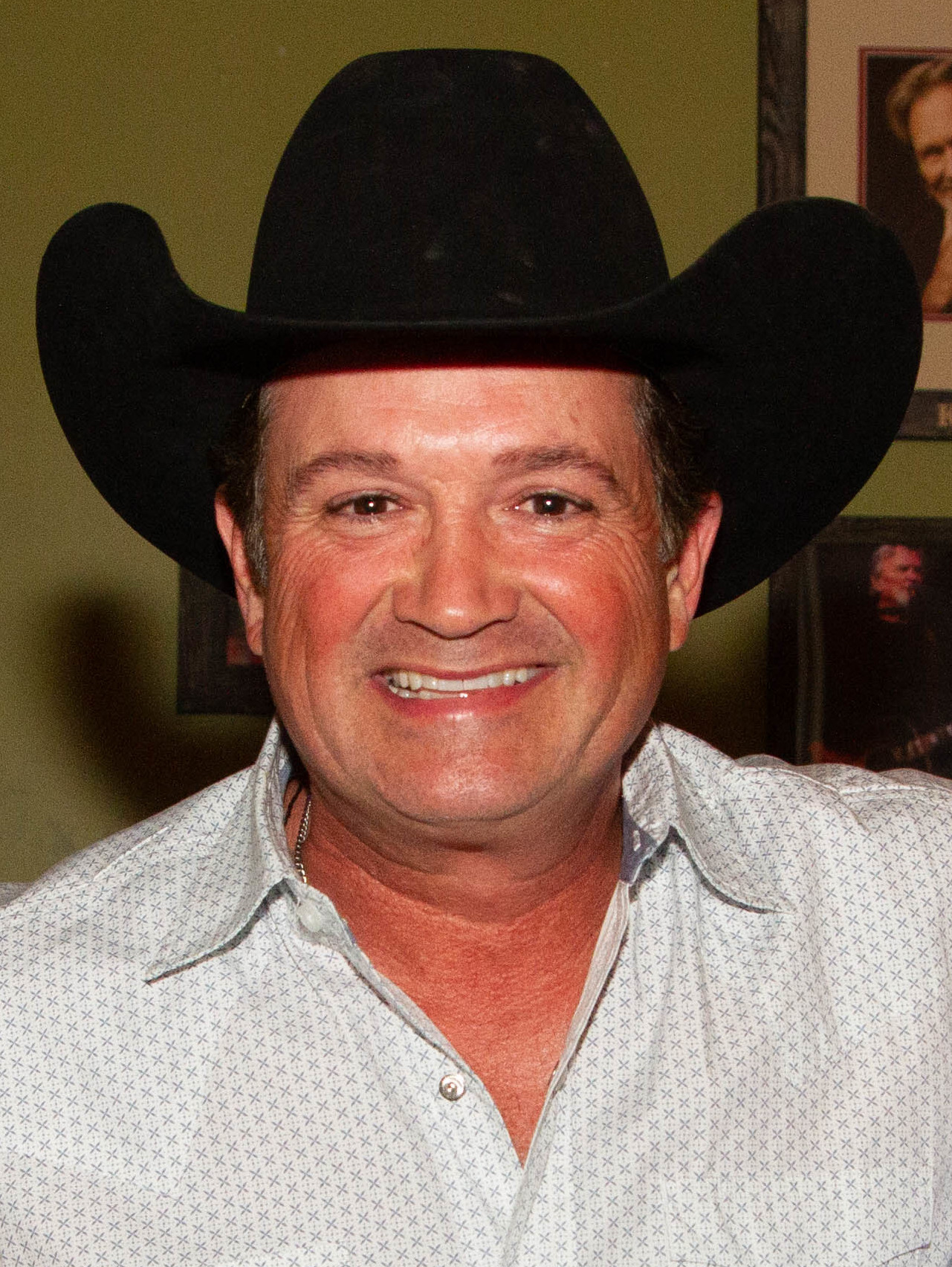
- Byrd in 2019

Background information
- Born: Tracy Lynn Byrd; December 17, 1966 (age 59); Beaumont, Texas, US
- Origin: Vidor, Texas, US
- Genre: Country
- Occupations: Singer, songwriter
- Instruments: Vocals, guitar
- Years active: 1992–present
- Labels: MCA Nashville, RCA Nashville, BNA, Blind Mule
- Website: http://tracybyrdmusic.com/

Tracy Lynn Byrd (born December 17, 1966) is an American country music artist. Signed to MCA Nashville Records in 1992, Byrd broke through on the country music scene that year with his 1993 single "Holdin' Heaven", which reached Number One on Billboard Hot Country Singles & Tracks. Although he did not land a second Number One until 2002's "Ten Rounds with Jose Cuervo", Byrd has charted more than thirty hit singles in his career, including eleven additional Top Ten hits. He has also released ten studio albums and two greatest-hits albums, with four gold certifications and one double-platinum certification from the Recording Industry Association of America. He was the on-air spokesman for the TNN Outdoors block from 1998 to 2000.

== Biography ==
Tracy Lynn Byrd was born December 17, 1966. He is the eldest child of Jerry Lynn and Brenda Vaughn Byrd. Tracy Byrd graduated from Vidor High School in May 1985. His first college experience was at Lamar University, Beaumont, Texas. He began studying business at Texas State University (then called Southwest Texas State). While studying he sang with a local band in Beaumont called Rimfire led by Jeffrey Adams and Dave Adams, a band that also featured acts such as Mark Chesnutt.

One of his friends coaxed him into singing a cover of Hank Williams' "Your Cheatin' Heart" at a local mall recording studio. The owner of the studio was so impressed with his version that he entered Byrd into a local talent contest. Byrd signed with MCA Records in 1992.

== Music career ==
=== 1992–1999: MCA Records ===
==== Tracy Byrd ====
Byrd released his first single, "That's the Thing About a Memory", in 1992. Although it and follow-up "Someone to Give My Love To" (previously a single in 1971 for Johnny Paycheck) both missed Top 40, he broke through in 1993 with the Number One hit "Holdin' Heaven". This song was the third release from his self-titled debut album, released by MCA on April 27, 1993. Although the album earned RIAA gold certification, its final single ("Why Don't That Telephone Ring") peaked at No. 39. Keith Stegall and Tony Brown shared production duties on the album.

==== No Ordinary Man ====
No Ordinary Man was the title of Byrd's second album, which was produced by Jerry Crutchfield. It was also his highest selling, earning a double-platinum certification for U.S. sales of two million copies. All four singles from the album reached Top Five: "Lifestyles of the Not So Rich and Famous", "Watermelon Crawl" (also his first entry on the Billboard Hot 100, at No. 81), "The First Step" and "The Keeper of the Stars". This last song, a love ballad, became a popular choice for fans to use at their weddings. It also won Song of the Year at the Academy of Country Music in 1995. MCA had not originally planned to issue this song as a single, until Byrd commented that it had been receiving favorable reactions when he sang it in concert.

==== Love Lessons ====
His third album, 1995's Love Lessons, showed a decline in both chart performance and physical sales, despite still earning a gold certification. It was led off by the No. 15 "Walkin' to Jerusalem", followed by two ballads: the No. 9 peaking title track and No. 14 "Heaven in My Woman's Eyes", and finally the No. 21-peaking "4 to 1 in Atlanta". This album also reunited him with Tony Brown, who would also produce all of his subsequent material for MCA.

==== Big Love ====
Big Love, released in 1996, was the title of Byrd's fourth album and its first single. "Big Love" returned him to the Top Five with a No. 3 peak. After it came another Johnny Paycheck cover, this time of his 1971 single "She's All I Got." Re-titled "Don't Take Her She's All I Got", Byrd's cover peaked at No. 4. The album's other singles ("Don't Love Make a Diamond Shine" and "Good Ol' Fashioned Love") reached No. 17 and No. 47 respectively, with the latter being his first single since 1993 to miss Top 40. Big Love also became his third gold-selling album.

==== I'm from the Country and Keepers: Greatest Hits ====
Byrd released his final studio album for MCA, I'm from the Country, in late 1997. Its title track, co-written by Richard Young of The Kentucky Headhunters and former MCA Records artist Marty Brown, became the first single. This song was added to the album, which was originally to be titled Walkin' the Line, after the rest of the album had already been completed. It also became his ninth Top 10 hit by reaching No. 3 in early 1998 and his first No. 1 on the RPM Country Tracks charts in Canada. Only one other single, the No. 9 hit "I Wanna Feel That Way Again", was released from the album.

In 1999, Byrd then released a greatest-hits package entitled Keepers: Greatest Hits, which is certified gold. This album was led off by the No. 31 single "When Mama Ain't Happy" before he left the label.

=== 1999–2004: RCA Records ===
==== It's About Time ====
In 1999, Byrd signed to RCA Records Nashville. Working with producer Billy Joe Walker Jr., he released his sixth studio album, It's About Time, that year. This album featured a more country pop sound than its predecessors, and was led off by the No. 11 "Put Your Hand in Mine". This song was co-written by Skip Ewing and Jimmy Wayne. The album's other two singles — "Love, You Ain't Seen the Last of Me" and "Take Me With You When You Go" — both landed outside the Top 40.

==== Ten Rounds ====
Ten Rounds, his second album for RCA, was released in 2001. This album returned him to a more traditionally country sound. It was led off by "A Good Way to Get on My Bad Side", a duet with Mark Chesnutt. This song was a No. 21 country hit, and Chesnutt's first Top 40 chart hit since "This Heartache Never Sleeps" two years previous. After it came the No. 9 "Just Let Me Be in Love", and finishing off the album's single releases was its title track, "Ten Rounds with José Cuervo". In October 2002, this song became Byrd's second No. 1 country hit, and his first since "Holdin' Heaven" in 1993. It was also his only Top 40 pop hit, with a No. 26 peak on the Billboard Hot 100.

==== The Truth About Men ====
Byrd charted at No. 38 in early 2003 with "Lately (Been Dreamin' 'Bout Babies)", which was never included on an album. This song was followed by "The Truth About Men", a song whose second verse featured guest vocals from Blake Shelton, Andy Griggs and Montgomery Gentry. This song was the title track to his final RCA album, The Truth About Men, which also produced his final Top Ten hit in the No. 7 "Drinkin' Bone", as well as the No. 53 "How'd I Wind Up in Jamaica." Also included on this album was the Rodney Crowell composition "Making Memories of Us", which would later be a Number One country hit in 2005 for Keith Urban.

=== 2005: BNA Records ===
==== Greatest Hits ====
Byrd's second greatest hits album was released in 2005 via BNA Records, a sister label to RCA. This album reprised most of his RCA single releases, and included new recordings of "I'm from the Country" and "The Keeper of the Stars." Also included on it were the new tracks "Revenge of a Middle-Aged Woman", "Tiny Town" and "Johnny Cash". The first two were released as singles, with the former reaching No. 34 and the latter failing to chart. "Johnny Cash" was later covered by Jason Aldean on his 2007 album Relentless, and was a No. 6 country hit for him that year.

=== 2006–present: Blind Mule Records & later work ===
==== Different Things ====
Byrd released his next album, Different Things, in 2006 via his own Blind Mule label. It was led off by the No. 55 "Cheapest Motel", co-written by Cole Deggs of Cole Deggs & the Lonesome. After this song came "Better Places Than This," which failed to chart as well.

==== All American Texan ====
In June 2016, Byrd returned to the studio to work on his first project in a decade. This album, recorded at Rosewood Studios in Tyler, Texas, was self-produced and promoted. Byrd wrote eight of the album's ten tracks himself. The album was released in October 2016.

==== Tracy Byrd : Live at Billy Bob's Texas ====
In November 2019 Byrd released a live album, recorded in June 2019 with his band, The ByrdDawgs. The album was recorded at Billy Bob's Texas, and holds nineteen songs.

==== Tracy Byrd : Live at Billy Bob's Texas DVD ====
The DVD of Byrd's Billy Bob's Texas concert in June 2019, was released in November 2019. In addition to the music, it contains several interview segments with Byrd.

== Charitable efforts ==
Byrd has been the National Spokesperson for Special Olympics International for the Country Music Association. He developed a crank bait fishing lure marketed by Norman Lures called The Lifestyles of the Not So Rich & Famous, named after his hit recording of the song written by Byron Hill and Wayne Tester. For every one of the lures sold Byrd donated ten cents to the Special Olympics.

For several years Byrd hosted an annual golfing/fishing/music event, "The Tracy Byrd Homecoming Weekend," later called "The Beaumont Boys Bash", in Southeast Texas to raise money for local charities, including the March of Dimes, the Children's Miracle Network, and culminating in the donation of money to fund the Tracy Byrd Hyperbaric Medicine and Wound Care Center at St. Elizabeth's Hospital in Beaumont. Byrd also raised money by soliciting pledges for his attempt to complete the 2002 Houston Marathon. He finished the marathon, and donated all of his pledges to the Children's Miracle Network.

In 2003 Byrd published Eat Like a Byrd: The Tracy Byrd Cookbook. He also launched a line of spices, rubs, and marinades to go along with it, called "Tracy Byrd's Tiny Town Products"; a portion of these sales were donated to the Children's Miracle Network.

On December 28, 2012, he performed "Amazing Grace" at the memorial service for KFDM news anchor Bill Leger.

== Discography ==
=== Studio albums ===
- Tracy Byrd (1993)
- No Ordinary Man (1994)
- Love Lessons (1995)
- Big Love (1996)
- I'm from the Country (1998)
- It's About Time (1999)
- Ten Rounds (2001)
- The Truth About Men (2003)
- Different Things (2006)
- All American Texan (2016)

== Awards and nominations ==
=== American Music Awards ===
Year	Nominee / work	Award	Result
1994	Tracy Byrd	Favorite Country New Artist	Nominated

=== TNN/Music City News Country Awards ===
Year	Nominee / work	Award	Result
1995	Tracy Byrd	Male Star of Tomorrow	Nominated
1996	"The Keeper of the Stars"	Single of the Year	Nominated

=== Academy of Country Music Awards ===
Year	Nominee / work	Award	Result
1996	"The Keeper of the Stars"	Song of the Year	Won
2004	"The Truth About Men"	Vocal Event of the Year	Nominated

=== Country Music Association Awards ===
Year	Nominee / work	Award	Result
1995	"The Keeper of the Stars"	Single of the Year	Nominated
2003	"The Truth About Men"	Vocal Event of the Year	Nominated
