= The Mavericks discography =

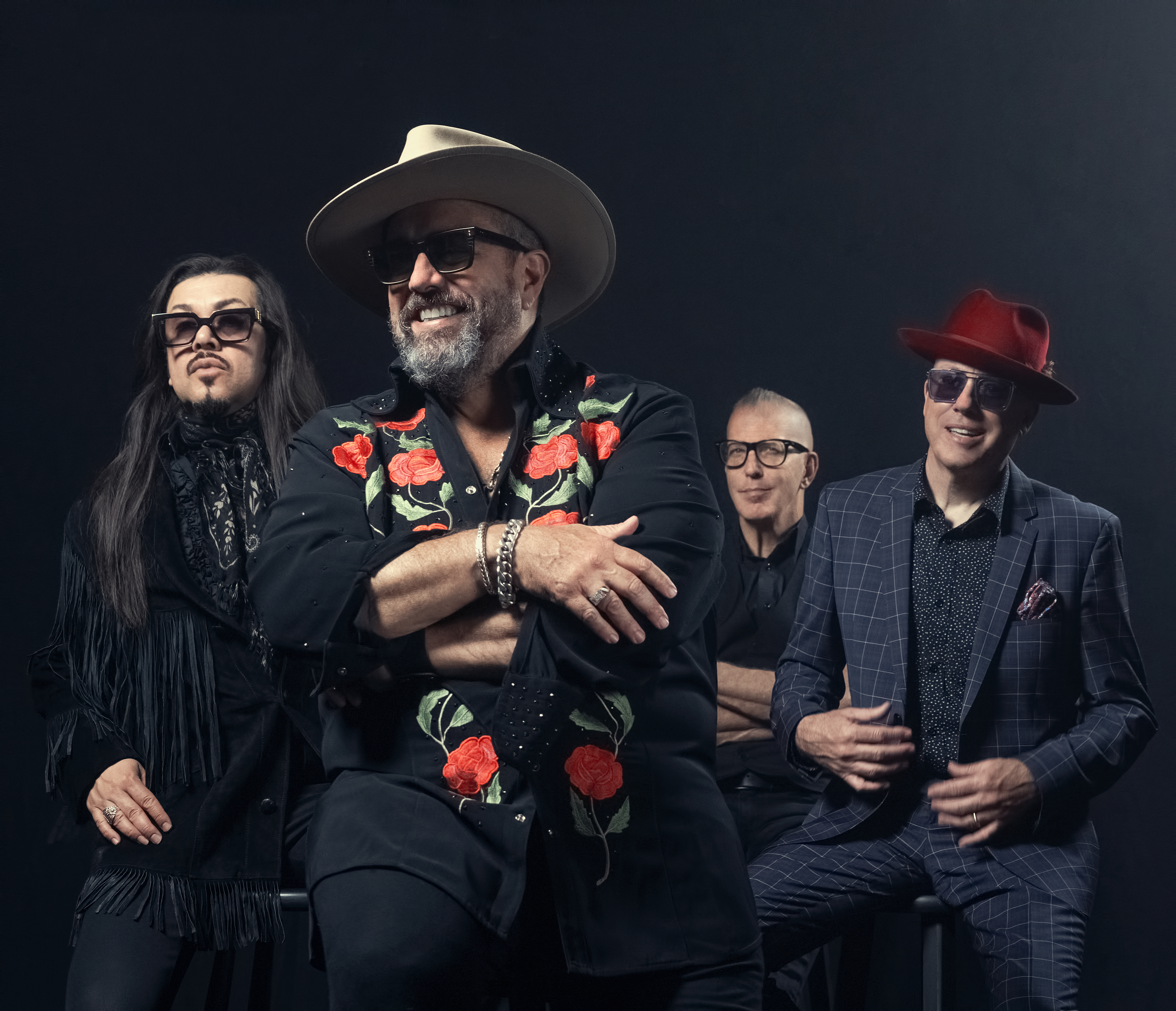
- The Mavericks in 2020
- Studio albums: 12
- Extended plays: 1
- Live albums: 3
- Compilation albums: 6
- Singles: 28
- Music videos: 26

American country music band the Mavericks have released 12 studio albums, six compilation albums, three live albums and one EP. The band's highest-certified album is 1994's What a Crying Shame, certified platinum by the RIAA and double platinum by the CRIA. 1995's Music for All Occasions was certified gold in the US and platinum in Canada, while Trampoline and It's Now! It's Live!, both from 1998, earned gold certification in Canada.

The Mavericks also released 28 singles. Although 14 of these charted on the Billboard country singles charts, none reached the top 10 on that chart, with the highest-peaking being the number 13 "All You Ever Do Is Bring Me Down", a collaboration with accordionist Flaco Jiménez. "What a Crying Shame", "O What a Thrill", and "Here Comes the Rain" all reached the top 10 on the former RPM Country Tracks chart in Canada. "Dance the Night Away" and "I've Got This Feeling" both entered the UK Singles Chart, with the former peaking at number four.

== Studio albums ==
=== 1990s ===
| Title | Album details | Peak chart positions | | | | | | | | | | Certifications |
| Title | Album details | US Country | US | US Heat | CAN Country | CAN | NL | NZ | NOR | SWE | UK | Certifications |
|---|---|---|---|---|---|---|---|---|---|---|---|---|
| The Mavericks | Release date: 1990; Label: Y&T Music | — | — | — | — | — | — | — | — | — | — | |
| From Hell to Paradise | Release date: May 12, 1992; Label: MCA Nashville | — | — | — | — | — | — | — | — | — | — | |
| What a Crying Shame | Release date: February 1, 1994; Label: MCA Nashville | 6 | 54 | 1 | 4 | 45 | — | — | — | — | — | CAN: 2× Platinum; US: Platinum |
| Music for All Occasions | Release date: September 26, 1995; Label: MCA Nashville | 9 | 58 | — | 3 | 54 | — | — | — | — | 56 | CAN: Platinum; US: Gold |
| Trampoline | Release date: March 10, 1998; Label: MCA Nashville | 9 | 96 | — | 3 | 43 | 25 | 10 | 37 | 47 | 10 | CAN: Gold |
"—" denotes releases that did not chart

=== 2000s–present ===
| Title | Album details | Peak chart positions | | | | | | | | Sales |
| Title | Album details | US | US Country | US Indie | US Folk | BEL | CAN | NL | UK | Sales |
|---|---|---|---|---|---|---|---|---|---|---|
| The Mavericks | Release date: September 23, 2003; Label: Sanctuary Records | — | 32 | — | — | — | — | — | 65 | |
| In Time | Release date: February 26, 2013; Label: Valory Music Group | 39 | 8 | — | — | 82 | — | — | 37 | US: 75,000 |
| Mono | Release date: February 17, 2015; Label: Valory Music Group | 57 | 5 | — | — | 137 | — | 70 | 96 | US: 15,200 |
| Brand New Day | Release date: March 31, 2017; Label: Mono Mundo | 149 | 31 | 10 | 7 | 121 | — | 109 | — | US: 15,800 |
| Hey! Merry Christmas! | Release date: November 2, 2018; Label: Mono Mundo | — | — | 18 | — | — | — | — | — | US: 10,400 |
| Play the Hits | Release date: November 1, 2019; Label: Mono Mundo | — | — | 8 | 19 | — | 95 | — | — | US: 9,700 |
| En Español | Release date: August 21, 2020; Label: Mono Mundo | — | 32 | — | 6 | — | — | — | — | |
| Moon & Stars | Release date: May 17, 2024; Label: Mono Mundo | — | — | — | — | 155 | — | — | — | |
"—" denotes releases that did not chart.

== Compilation albums ==
| Title | Album details | Peak chart positions | | | | Certifications |
| Title | Album details | US Country | CAN Country | NL | UK | Certifications |
|---|---|---|---|---|---|---|
| The Mavericks | Release date: June 30, 1998; Label: Hip-O Records | — | — | — | — | |
| Super Colossal Smash Hits of the 90's: The Best of The Mavericks | Release date: November 9, 1999; Label: Mercury Nashville | 45 | 13 | 60 | 40 | UK: Gold |
| 20th Century Masters: The Millennium Collection | Release date: August 28, 2001; Label: MCA Nashville | — | — | — | — | |
| The Definitive Collection | Release date: June 22, 2004; Label: MCA Nashville | — | — | — | — | |
| Gold | Release date: August 8, 2006; Label: MCA Nashville | — | — | — | — | |
| Icon | Release date: March 1, 2011; Label: MCA Nashville | — | — | — | — | |
"—" denotes releases that did not chart

== Live albums ==
| Title | Album details | Peak chart positions | | | Certifications (sales thresholds) |
| Title | Album details | US Country | US Indie | CAN Country | Certifications (sales thresholds) |
|---|---|---|---|---|---|
| It's Now! It's Live! | Release date: October 20, 1998; Label: MCA Nashville | — | — | 3 | CAN: Gold |
| Live in Austin Texas | Release date: September 28, 2004; Label: Sanctuary | — | — | — | |
| All Night Live: Volume 1 | Release date: October 14, 2016; Label: Mono Mundo | 14 | 20 | — | |
"—" denotes releases that did not chart

== Extended plays ==
| Title | Album details | Peak positions |
| Title | Album details | US Country |
|---|---|---|
| Suited Up and Ready | Release date: May 29, 2012; Label: Big Machine Records | 47 |

== Singles ==
=== 1990s ===
| Year | Single | Peak chart positions | | | | Album |
| Year | Single | US Country | CAN Country | UK | NL | Album |
|---|---|---|---|---|---|---|
| 1990 | "This Broken Heart" | — | — | — | — | The Mavericks |
| 1992 | "Hey Good Lookin'" | 74 | 73 | — | — | From Hell to Paradise |
| 1992 | "This Broken Heart" | — | — | — | — | From Hell to Paradise |
| 1992 | "I Got You" | — | — | — | — | From Hell to Paradise |
| 1993 | "What a Crying Shame" | 25 | 6 | — | — | What a Crying Shame |
| 1994 | "O What a Thrill" | 18 | 7 | — | — | What a Crying Shame |
| 1994 | "There Goes My Heart" | 20 | 14 | — | — | What a Crying Shame |
| 1995 | "I Should Have Been True" | 30 | 34 | — | — | What a Crying Shame |
| 1995 | "All That Heaven Will Allow" | 49 | 20 | — | — | What a Crying Shame |
| 1995 | "Blue Moon" (Note: "Blue Moon" also peaked at number 15 on the RPM Adult Contemporary chart in Canada.) | — | 57 | — | — | Apollo 13 (soundtrack) |
| 1995 | "Here Comes the Rain" | 22 | 4 | 99 | — | Music for All Occasions |
| 1996 | "All You Ever Do Is Bring Me Down" (with Flaco Jiménez) | 13 | 15 | — | — | Music for All Occasions |
| 1996 | "Missing You" | 54 | 62 | — | — | Music for All Occasions |
| 1996 | "I Don't Care (If You Love Me Anymore)" | 65 | 89 | — | — | Michael (soundtrack) |
| 1998 | "To Be with You" | 51 | 23 | — | — | Trampoline |
| 1998 | "Dance the Night Away" | 63 | 72 | 4 | 25 | Trampoline |
| 1998 | "I've Got This Feeling" | — | — | 27 | — | Trampoline |
| 1999 | "Someone Should Tell Her" | — | — | 45 | — | Trampoline |
| 1999 | "Here Comes My Baby" | 42 | 40 | 82 | 77 | Super Colossal Smash Hits of the 90's: The Best of the Mavericks |
| 1999 | "Things I Cannot Change" | — | — | — | — | Super Colossal Smash Hits of the 90's: The Best of the Mavericks |
"—" denotes releases that did not chart

=== 2000s–2020s ===
| Year | Single | Peak positions | Album |
| Year | Single | US Country | Album |
|---|---|---|---|
| 2003 | "I Want to Know" | — | The Mavericks (2003) |
| 2003 | "Would You Believe" | — | The Mavericks (2003) |
| 2004 | "The Air That I Breathe" | 59 | The Mavericks (2003) |
| 2012 | "Born to Be Blue" | 46 | In Time |
| 2013 | "Back in Your Arms Again" | — | In Time |
| 2015 | "All Night Long" | — | Mono |
| 2015 | "Summertime (When I'm with You)" | — | Mono |
| 2017 | "Brand New Day" | — | Brand New Day |
| 2020 | "Poder Vivir" | — | En Español |
"—" denotes releases that did not chart

== Music videos ==
| Year | Video | Director |
|---|---|---|
| 1992 | "Hey Good Lookin'" | John Lloyd Miller |
| 1992 | "This Broken Heart" | Sherman Halsey |
| 1994 | "What a Crying Shame" | Roger Pistole |
| 1994 | "O What a Thrill" | Roger Pistole |
| 1994 | "There Goes My Heart" | Michael McNamara |
| 1995 | "I Should Have Been True" | Steven Goldmann |
| 1995 | "Blue Moon" | Todd Hallowell |
| 1995 | "Here Comes the Rain" | Gerry Wenner |
| 1996 | "All You Ever Do Is Bring Me Down" | Gerry Wenner |
| 1996 | "Missing You" | Gerry Wenner |
| 1996 | "I Don't Care If You Love Me Anymore" | Gerry Wenner |
| 1998 | "To Be with You" | Gerry Wenner |
| 1998 | "Dance the Night Away" | Gerry Wenner |
| 1998 | "I've Got This Feeling" | Gerry Wenner |
| 1999 | "Things I Cannot Change" | Lance Mungia |
| 1999 | "Here Comes My Baby" | Steven Goldmann |
| 2003 | "Would You Believe" | Steven Goldmann |
| 2004 | "All You Ever Do Is Bring Me Down" (live) | Mike Drumm |
| 2012 | "Born to Be Blue" | David McClister |
| 2013 | "Back in Your Arms Again" | Trey Fanjoy |
| 2015 | "All Night Long" | Raymond Lewis |
| 2015 | "Summertime (When I'm with You)" | Nick Rau |
| 2015 | "Pardon Me" | Raymond Lewis |
| 2016 | "The Only Question Is" | |
| 2017 | "Brand New Day" | Shaun Silva |
| 2017 | "Easy As It Seems" | Randy Hale and Jim Yockey |
