= Super Colossal Smash Hits of the 90's: The Best of The Mavericks =

Greatest hits album by The Mavericks
- Released: November 9, 1999
- Genre: Americana; Tex-Mex; western swing; neotraditional country
- Length: 46:51; 57:20 (re-release)
- Label: Mercury Nashville
- Producer: Richard Bennett; Don Cook; Steve Fishell; Raul Malo

The Mavericks chronology
Trampoline (1998)	Super Colossal Smash Hits of the 90's: The Best of The Mavericks (1999)	The Mavericks (2003)

Professional ratings
Review scores
Source	Rating
Allmusic	link

Super Colossal Smash Hits of the 90's: The Best of The Mavericks is the first greatest hits collection by the American country music band The Mavericks. The album was originally released on November 9, 1999, by Mercury Nashville. It was re-released on January 25, 2000, with three bonus tracks. "Here Comes My Baby" and "Things I Cannot Change" were released as singles.

In the UK, the album was simply titled The Best of The Mavericks, though it retained the same cover as the US version. It reached number 40 on the UK Albums Chart and was certified Gold by the BPI for sales in excess of 100,000 copies.

== Track listing ==
1. "Things I Cannot Change" (Dennis Britt, Jaime Hanna, Alan Miller) – 3:41
2. "Pizziricco" (Kostas, Raul Malo) – 4:04
3. "Here Comes My Baby" (Cat Stevens) – 3:13
4. "Think of Me (When You're Lonely)" (Estella Olson, Don Rich) – 2:22
5. "Dance the Night Away" (Malo) – 4:22
6. "All You Ever Do Is Bring Me Down" with Flaco Jiménez (Al Anderson, Malo) – 4:21
7. "Here Comes the Rain" (Kostas, Malo) – 3:47
8. "I Should Have Been True" (Stan Lynch, Malo) – 5:12
9. "There Goes My Heart" (Kostas, Malo) – 3:16
10. "What a Crying Shame" (Kostas, Malo) – 3:51
11. "This Broken Heart" (Malo) – 3:49
12. "From Hell to Paradise" (Malo) – 4:53

=== Re-release ===
1. "Things I Cannot Change" (Dennis Britt, Jaime Hanna, Alan Miller) – 3:41
2. "A World Without Love" (John Lennon, Paul McCartney) – 3:44^{A}
3. "Are You Lonesome Tonight?" (Lou Handman, Roy Turk) – 3:02^{A}
4. "Think of Me (When You're Lonely)" (Estella Olson, Don Rich) – 2:22
5. "Here Comes My Baby" (Cat Stevens) – 3:13
6. "Pizziricco" (Kostas, Raul Malo) – 4:04
7. "I've Got This Feeling" (Hanna, Malo) – 3:45^{A}
8. "Dance the Night Away" (Malo) – 4:22
9. "All You Ever Do Is Bring Me Down" with Flaco Jiménez (Al Anderson, Malo) – 4:21
10. "Here Comes the Rain" (Kostas, Malo) – 3:47
11. "I Should Have Been True" (Stan Lynch, Malo) – 5:12
12. "There Goes My Heart" (Kostas, Malo) – 3:16
13. "What a Crying Shame" (Kostas, Malo) – 3:51
14. "This Broken Heart" (Malo) – 3:49
15. "From Hell to Paradise" (Malo) – 4:53
- ^{A}Bonus track.

== Personnel on bonus tracks ==
=== The Mavericks ===
- Paul Deakin – drums
- Nick Kane – electric guitar
- Raul Malo – lead vocals, acoustic guitar, electric guitar
- Robert Reynolds – bass guitar, background vocals

=== Additional musicians ===
- Dennis Burnside – Hammond organ, conductor, string arrangements
- Glen Caruba – percussion
- Jeff Coffin – baritone saxophone
- Chris Dunn – trombone
- Richard Foust – trombone
- Matt Glassmeyer – tenor saxophone
- Barry Green – trombone
- Jaime Hanna – acoustic guitar, handclapping, background vocals
- Eric Holt – piano
- Scotty Huff – horn arrangements, trumpet, background vocals
- Matt Nygren – trumpet
- Denis Solee – alto saxophone
- Robby Turner – pedal steel guitar

== Chart performance ==
Chart (1999)	Peak position
U.S. Billboard Top Country Albums	45
Canadian RPM Country Albums	13
UK Albums Chart	40

== Certifications ==
Region	Certification	Certified units/sales
United Kingdom (BPI)	Gold	100,000^{^}
^{^} Shipments figures based on certification alone.
