= Michael Guerra =

American accordionist

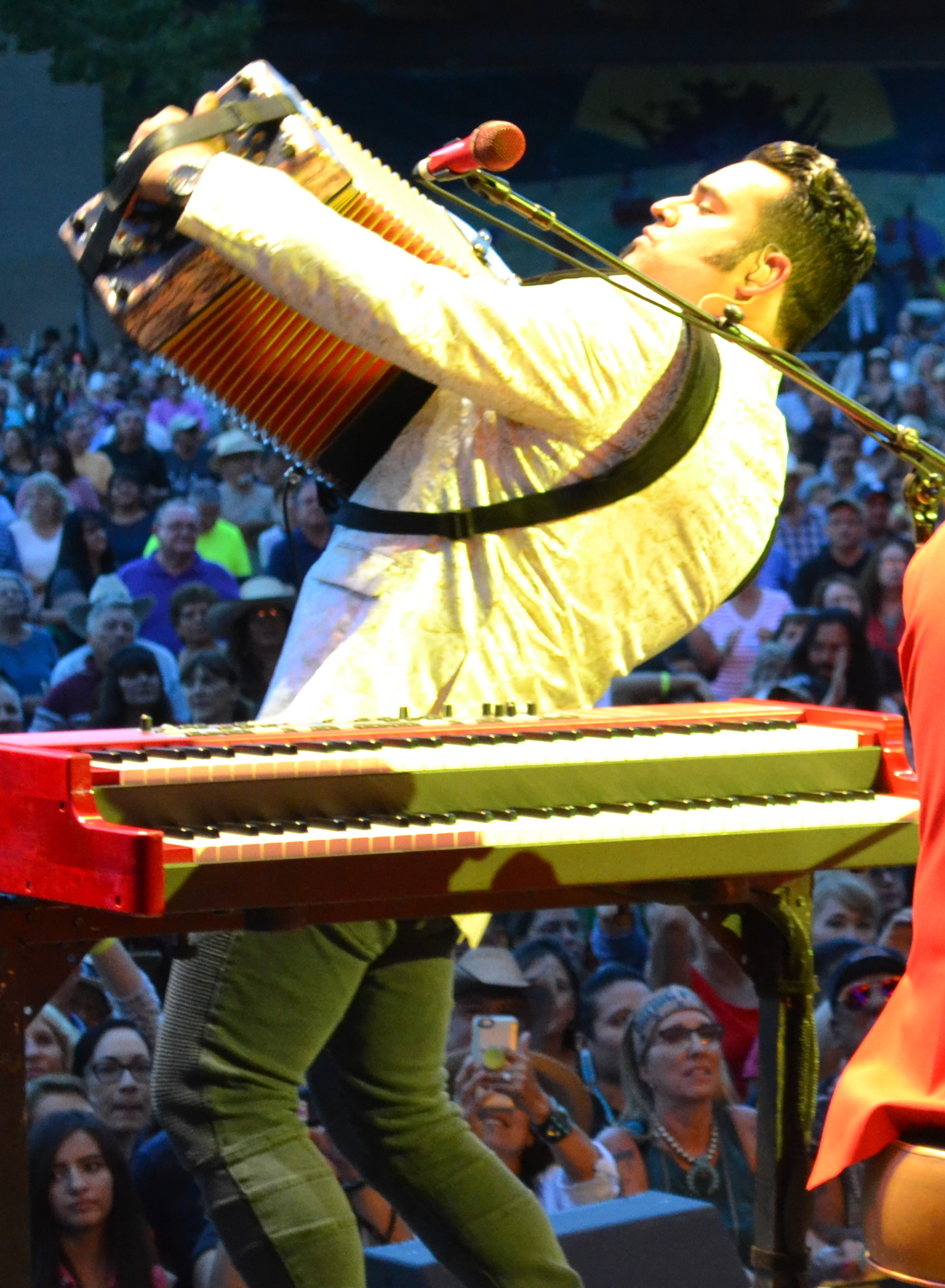
- Guerra playing with The Mavericks in Taos, New Mexico in 2017

Background information
- Born: Michael Edward Guerra; September 6, 1981 (age 45); Los Angeles, California, U.S.
- Genres: Blues rock, rock, tejano/tex-mex, country
- Occupations: Musician, composer, singer, producer
- Instruments: Accordion, guitar, drums, bass guitar, piano, bajo-sexto
- Years active: 1999–present
- Website: thenightscalling.com

Michael Edward Guerra (born September 9, 1981), is a California-based accordionist, music producer, studio musician, and singer/songwriter. He has performed and recorded with various bands, including The Mavericks, and Raul Malo, and has also led his own band, The Michael Guerra Band.

== History ==
Since 2012, he has continuously been on tour and performs with the Mavericks.

In the summer of 2012, Guerra co-founded a production company DB Media Entertainment with songwriting partner D.R. Pedraza and produced his first film score for the short film "To Serve and Protect"

In 2014, Guerra produced his second film score for "The Last Rose".

In August 2015, Guerra produced his third film score for the film "My Tempest" and was nominated for Best Score in the 48 Hour Film Project, San Antonio.

In 2016, Guerra released a new single "Such A Girl Like That" under a new band, Michael Guerra & The Nights Calling. The song debuted on KSYM-FM Radio on May 5, 2016.

Also in 2016, Guerra produced his fourth film score for the short film "A Chance to Say Goodbye".

In 2017, Guerra was the composer for the television series Slate Me! which ran for three seasons.

Under his new band's name, The Nights Calling, Guerra released the first single on the new album "Groove All Night," "Groove All Night" under his own label.

In 2020, Guerra is producing scores for two projects for DB Media Entertainment, one a television series called "The Route 66 Interviews: Foodies who Rock and for a feature film "Isadora" both filming in 2021.

== Discography ==
=== Los Tex Maniacs ===
- 2006 – A Tex Mex Groove by Los Tex-maniacs (Maniax Records) Guerra plays accordion

=== Michael Guerra Band ===
- 2012 – The Michael Guerra Band by The Michael Guerra Band (BMI/MGB Music) Released in 2012

=== Michael Guerra & The Nights Calling ===
- 2016 Such A Girl Like That Single by Michael Guerra & The Nights Calling (BMI/MGB Music)
- 2019 Groove All Night Single by Michael Guerra & The Nights Calling (BMI/MGB Music)

=== Recordings by other artists ===
- 2003 - Shawn Sahm by Shawn Sahm Guerra plays accordion
- 2020 - En Espanol by The Mavericks Guerra plays Accordion, bajo sexto, various percussion;background vocals
- 2005 - Heard it on the X by Los Super Seven Guerra plays background vocals
- 2006 - My Freeholies Ain't Free Anymore by Augie Meyers Guerra plays accordion, background vocals
- 2006 – Sacred by Los Lonely Boys (Sony BMG) Guerra plays accordion
- 2008 – Tex Mex Experience by Tex Mex Experience (Evangeline) Guerra plays bajo sexto
- 2008 – Prayer of a Common Man by Phil Vassar (Universal South) Guerra plays accordion
- 2010 - Esta Bueno by Texas Tornados Guerra plays Bajo Sexto, background vocals
- 2010 - Americano by The Krayolas Guerra plays Accordion
- 2010 – Sinners & Saints by Raul Malo (Fantasy Records) Guerra plays accordion
- 2012 - Around the World by Raul Malo Guerra plays accordion
- 2013 – In Time by The Mavericks (Valory Music) Guerra plays Accordion, bajo sexto, various percussion
- 2014 - Real by Michael Hardie Guerra plays Accordion
- 2015 – Mono by The Mavericks (Valory Music) Guerra plays Accordion, bajo sexto, various percussion
- 2015 - 40 Years by The Bellamy Brothers Guerra plays accordion
- 2017 – Brand New Day by The Mavericks (Mono Mundo Recordings) Guerra plays Accordion, bajo sexto, various percussion;background vocals

- 2017 - Highways and Heart Attacks by Will Beeley Guerra plays Accordion
- 2017 - South Texas Suite by Whitney Rose Guerra plays accordion
- 2018 - Hey! Merry Christmas! by The Mavericks Guerra plays Accordion, bajo sexto, various percussion, background vocals
- 2019 - Play The Hits by The Mavericks Guerra is a featured artist and plays percussion and Cajun Accordion
- 2019 - Groove All Night by Michael Guerra Guerra plays Accordion, bajo sexto, various percussion; vocals
- 2020 - En Espanol by The Mavericks Guerra plays Accordion, bajo sexto, various percussion, background vocals
- 2020 - Technicolor by The Sweet Lizzy Project Guerra plays Accordion,

== Filmography ==
- 2012 - "To Serve and Protect" produced by DB Media Entertainment Composer
- 2014 - "The Last Rose" produced by DB Media Entertainment Composer and Music Editor
- 2015 - "My Tempest" produced by DB Media Entertainment Writer, Editor and Composer
- 2016 - "A Chance to Say Goodbye" produced by DB Media Entertainment Composer
- 2017 - "Slate Me!" produced by DB Media Entertainment co-producer and Composer
- 2020 - "Isadora" produced by DB Media Entertainment to be filmed in 2021, Film Score
- 2020 - "The Route 66 Interviews: Foodies who Rock" produced by DB Media Entertainment to be filmed in 2021, Score and Composer
