= Eddie Perez (guitarist) =

American guitarist and singer (born 1958)

- Born: Edward Anthony Perez; June 26, 1968 (age 57); Los Angeles, California, United States
- Genres: Country
- Occupation: Musician
- Instruments: Guitar, vocal
- Member of: the Mavericks

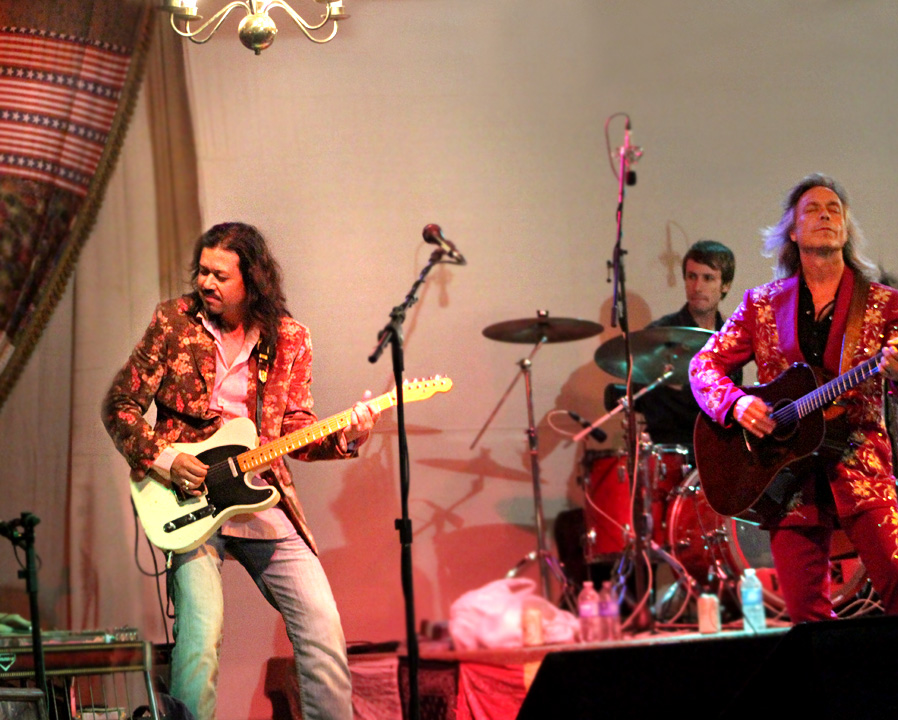
Eddie Perez

Edward Anthony Perez (born June 26, 1968, in Los Angeles, California) is an American guitarist and singer. He currently tours and records with the Mavericks after a long time of being on tour with Dwight Yoakam. Perez joined the Mavericks as a member in 2003. He has also played with other notable artists such as James Intveld, Connie Smith, Jim Lauderdale, Miranda Lambert, Lee Ann Womack, Gary Allan and Kim Richey. In addition to his work with the Mavericks, he has worked with Mavericks' lead singer, Raul Malo, on his solo projects, including the Peter Asher-produced record, You're Only Lonely.

He can be seen on the DVD The Mavericks - Live in Austin, Texas, as well as the DVD Return to Sin City: A Tribute to Gram Parsons. He also appeared in CMT's 100 Greatest Love Songs and 100 Greatest Duets.

== Biography ==
Born in Los Angeles, Perez grew up listening to rock guitarists of the 1970s and 1980s. “My heroes were Jimmy Page, Jeff Beck, Eddie Van Halen and Ace Frehley. Everything a big-eyed boy would find fascinating about rock ’n’ roll, that was me. I was 12 years old and my father took me to see ZZ Top and it blew my mind. I was never the same after that.”

Perez began playing in bands at the age of 13 and discovered honky tonk music when he first heard Guitars, Cadillacs, Etc., Etc. by Dwight Yoakam, with whom he would later perform. “Hearing that really turned me around and it gave me a focus. From then on I started to learn everything I could about that music. But then I also had that rock ’n’ roll background, too.” In 2003, Perez replaced Nick Kane in the Mavericks, just a short time before the band broke up. A consummate showman, Perez is known for his flair on stage both in his dress and in his stage movements. "You wouldn’t think that an influence of Jimmy Page or Angus Young of AC/DC would fit into the Mavericks, but somehow it does,” Perez says of his stage presence. “When I’m on stage, I show up to give a performance because that’s what I would want to see. You dig what I’m saying? I’m not so much thinking it as much as I’m feeling it. I try to get to the most real, honest place that I can within each song. What I’m doing on stage is a visual to what that sound feels like to me.”

== Discography ==
- The Mavericks - The Mavericks (2003)
- The Mavericks - Live in Austin, Texas (2004)
- Raul Malo - You're Only Lonely (2006)
- Dwight Yoakam - Dwight Sings Buck (October 23, 2007)
- James Intveld - Have Faith (2008)
- George Strait - Twang (2009)
- Nick 13 (of Tiger Army) - Nick 13 (2011)
- Dwight Yoakam - 3 Pears (September 12, 2012)
- The Mavericks - In Time (2013)
- The Mavericks - Mono (2015)
- The Mavericks - All Night Live, Volume 1 (2016)
- The Mavericks - Brand New Day (2017)
- The Mavericks - Hey! Merry Christmas! (2018)
- The Mavericks - Play the Hits (2019)
- The Mavericks - En Español (2020)
- The Mavericks - Moon & Stars (2024)
