= In My Dreams (Rick Trevino album) =

Studio album by Rick Trevino
- Released: September 9, 2003
- Recorded: 2003
- Genre: Country
- Length: 36:14
- Label: Warner Bros. Nashville
- Producer: Raul Malo

Rick Trevino chronology
Mi Son (2001)	In My Dreams (2003)	Nuestra Tradición (2007)

Professional ratings
Review scores
Source	Rating
Allmusic	link
Entertainment Weekly	(A−) link

In My Dreams is the sixth studio album released by country music artist Rick Trevino. It was produced by Raul Malo, lead singer for the alternative country band The Mavericks. Malo and Jaime Hanna, another former member of the Mavericks (who, in 2005, would pair up with Jonathan McEuen to form the duo Hanna-McEuen), co-wrote the majority of this album's songs with Trevino and Alan Miller. The only exception is a cover of "Have You Ever Really Loved a Woman", a cover of the Bryan Adams song from 1995.

The album's title track, which The Mavericks themselves also recorded on their 2003 album The Mavericks, peaked at #41 on the Billboard Hot Country Singles & Tracks (now Hot Country Songs) charts in 2003. Following it was "Overnight Success", which failed to chart.

== Track listing ==
1. "Overnight Success" (Rick Trevino, Raul Malo, Jaime Hanna, Alan Miller) – 3:00
2. "In My Dreams" (Trevino, Malo, Miller) – 4:50
3. "She'll Never Know" (Trevino, Malo, Hanna, Miller) – 3:33
4. "Downside of Love" (Trevino, Malo, Hanna, Miller) – 3:21
5. "Beautiful Day" (Trevino, Malo, Miller) – 2:52
6. "Olivia" (Trevino, Malo, Hanna, Miller) – 3:42
7. "Are We Almost There" (Trevino, Malo, Miller) – 3:46
8. "Heartaches" (Trevino, Malo, Wally Wilson) – 3:04
9. "So Over" (Trevino, Malo, Hanna, Miller) – 2:54
10. "Have You Ever Really Loved a Woman?" (Bryan Adams, Robert John "Mutt" Lange, Michael Kamen) – 5:10

== Personnel ==
- Dennis Burnside - piano
- Glen Caruba - percussion
- Chad Cromwell - drums, percussion
- Dan Dugmore - steel guitar
- Larry Franklin - fiddle
- Jaime Hanna - background vocals
- Tim Lauer - electric organ, piano
- Raul Malo - acoustic guitar, high-strung guitar, electric guitar, tres, laúd, background vocals
- Gordon Mote - piano, B-3 organ, Wurlitzer, celeste, synthesizer
- Ramon Stagnaro - gut string guitar
- Rick Trevino - lead vocals
- Kenny Vaughn - acoustic guitar, electric guitar, baritone electric guitar
- Glenn Worf - bass guitar, tic-tac bass
- Paul Worley - acoustic guitar

Strings on tracks 3, 7 and 10 performed by the Nashville String Machine, conducted and arranged by Don Hart.

== Chart performance ==
Chart (2003)	Peak position
U.S. Billboard Top Country Albums	58
