= David Lee Holt =

American guitarist and recording artist

- Birth name: David Lee Holt
- Born: December 6, 1960 (age 64); Dallas, Texas, U.S.
- Genres: Rock, blues, alternative country
- Occupation(s): Musician, singer, songwriter
- Instrument(s): Guitar, vocals
- Years active: 1980–present
- Labels: Blue Corn Music, Atlantic, MCA Nashville, Storyville Records
- Formerly of: The Mavericks
- Website: davidleeholt.com

David Lee Holt (born December 6, 1960) is an American guitarist, vocalist and songwriter who is best known for being a member of the Austin-based group, Storyville, which included guitarist David Grissom, vocalist Malford Milligan, and Stevie Ray Vaughan’s Double Trouble rhythm section, Tommy Shannon and Chris Layton. He has also toured and recorded with Carlene Carter, The Mavericks, and Joe Ely. In 2004, Holt released his only solo effort, Perpetual Motion, on the Blue Corn Music label. He currently resides in Austin, Texas.

== Career ==
=== Carlene Carter ===
In 1990, Holt was hired by Carlene Carter at the suggestion of her ex-husband, Nick Lowe, to join her U.S. tour in support of her Warner Bros. release, I Fell In Love.

=== The Mavericks ===
In 1991, Holt joined a Miami-based band, The Mavericks, on their debut MCA release, From Hell to Paradise. He toured with the band for a little over a year before leaving to join then MCA label-mate Joe Ely on his Love and Danger tour.

=== Storyville ===
In January, 1994, Holt was asked by Susan Antone of Austin blues club, Antone’s, to fill in for Derek O’Brien and host the long-running tradition blues jam known as Blue Monday. Holt invited Tommy Shannon, Chris Layton, and David Grissom to join him, and with the addition of vocalist Malford Milligan, Storyville was born. They had two releases on Atlantic Records — "A Piece of Your Soul" and "Dog Years". The band was together five years (1994-1999) and then reunited briefly in 2006 to produce the independently released DVD, Storyville Live at Antone’s.

=== Joe Ely ===
In 2006, Holt became a permanent member of the Joe Ely Band, and has appeared on several of Joe’s releases.

== Discography ==
=== Solo ===
Perpetual Motion	Released: August 24, 2004; Label: Blue Corn Music; Formats: CD, digital download, streaming

=== With Storyville ===
A Piece of Your Soul	Released: 1996; Label: Atlantic; Formats: CD, Digital download, streaming
Dog Years	Released: 1998; Label: Atlantic; Formats: CD, digital download, streaming
Live at Antones	Released: 2007; Label: Storyville Records; Formats: CD and DVD, digital download

=== With The Mavericks ===
From Hell to Paradise	Released: May 12, 1992; Label: MCA Nashville; Formats: CD, digital download, streaming

=== With Joe Ely ===
Love and Danger	Released: 1993; Label: MCA; Formats: CD, digital download, streaming
Happy Songs From Rattlesnake Gulch	Released: 2007; Label: Rack Em' Records; Formats: CD, Digital download, streaming
Satisfied at Last	Released: 2011; Label: Rack Em' Records; Formats: CD, digital download, streaming
Panhandle Rambler	Released: 2015; Label: Rack Em' Records; Formats: CD, digital download, streaming
