= My Heart Would Know =

Single by Hank Williams With His Drifting Cowboys
- A-side: "Hey Good Lookin'"
- Released: June 22, 1951
- Recorded: March 16, 1951
- Studio: Castle Studio, Nashville
- Genre: Country & Western, Honky-tonk, Country blues
- Length: 2:24
- Label: MGM 11000
- Songwriter: Hank Williams
- Producer: Fred Rose

Hank Williams With His Drifting Cowboys singles chronology
"Howlin' at the Moon" (1951)	"My Heart Would Know" (1951)	"(I Heard That) Lonesome Whistle" (1951)

"My Heart Would Know" is a song written and recorded by Hank Williams. It was released as the B-side to "Hey Good Lookin'" in June 1951 on MGM Records.

== Background ==
Williams recorded "My Heart Would Know" on March 16, 1951 at Castle Studio in Nashville with Fred Rose producing. He was backed on the session by members of his Drifting Cowboys band, including Jerry Rivers (fiddle), Don Helms (steel guitar), Sammy Pruett (electric guitar), Jack Shook (rhythm guitar), Ernie Newton or "Cedric Rainwater," aka Howard Watts (bass), and either Owen Bradley or Rose on piano.

The song's subject manner is similar to "I Can't Help It (If I'm Still in Love with You)" (which was recorded at the same session) in that the narrator admits that he is still madly in love with a woman who no longer loves him. The song begins with an impossibly high steel guitar lick played by Don Helms, which became one of the hallmarks of the Hank Williams sound courtesy of Fred Rose:

He gave Don Helms the golden rule for accompanying Hank. "Fred said it was useless for me and Hank to be in the same register," said Helms. "He said, 'When Hank is singing something low why don't you play high, and if he's singing high, you play something low,' so the steel was always in a different register."

The song became well known due to the success of the "Hey Good Lookin'" single, which became Williams' sixth number one country hit.

The song later appeared in Disney-Pixar's Cars when McQueen was chased by Sheriff on the way to Radiator Springs.

== Cover versions ==
- Joni James covered the song for her 1959 MGM album Sings Songs of Hank Williams.
- Hank Williams, Jr. recorded the song as a duet with Lois Johnson.
- Charlie Rich released a version of the song in 1967.
- Don Gibson recorded the song for his 1971 LP Hank Williams as Sung by Don Gibson.
- A version by Merle Haggard was released in 1971 as the B-side of "Daddy Frank (The Guitar Man)" on Capitol Records.
- The The recorded the song for their Williams tribute LP Hanky Panky.
- Charlie Landsborough made it the title song for his 2005 album
