= Brand New Day (The Mavericks album) =

Studio album by The Mavericks
- Released: March 31, 2017
- Recorded: August–December 2016
- Genres: Tex-Mex; bluegrass; Americana
- Length: 38:11
- Label: Mono Mundo
- Producers: Niko Bolas, Raul Malo

The Mavericks chronology
Mono (2015)	Brand New Day (2017)	Hey! Merry Christmas! (2018)

Brand New Day is the ninth studio album from The Mavericks. It was released on March 31, 2017. It is the band's first studio album on their new Mono Mundo Recordings label.

== Commercial performance ==
The album debuted at No. 149 on the Billboard 200, and No. 31 on Top Country Albums in its first week of release. It sold 5,000 copies in the first week, and a further 1,500 in the second week. The album has sold 15,800 copies in the US as of October 2017.

== Track listing ==
No.	Title	Length
1.	"Rolling Along"	3:27
2.	"Brand New Day"	3:28
3.	"Easy as It Seems"	3:04
4.	"I Think of You"	3:19
5.	"Goodnight Waltz"	5:28
6.	"Damned (If You Do)"	3:59
7.	"I Will Be Yours"	3:39
8.	"Ride with Me"	4:28
9.	"I Wish You Well"	3:29
10.	"For the Ages"	3:50
Total length:		38:11

== Personnel ==
The Mavericks

- Raul Malo - lead vocals, electric guitar, acoustic guitar, piano, percussion
- Eddie Perez - electric guitar, acoustic guitar
- Jerry Dale McFadden - piano, organ
- Paul Deakin - drums, glockenspiel, timpani, marimba, vibraphone, chimes

Additional musicians

- Max Abrams - saxophone, clarinet
- Roy Agee - trombone
- Julio Diaz - trumpet, percussion
- Ed Friedland - electric bass, upright bass
- Michael Guerra - percussion, acoustic guitar, accordion
- Aaron Till - fiddle
- Scott Vestal - banjo
- Jay Weaver - double bass

Additional backing vocalists

- Etta Britt
- Tiffany Johnson
- Ann McCrary
- Alfreda McCrary
- Regina McCrary

Technical

- Kevin Dresser - sleeve design
- Allen Harrill - photography

== Charts ==
Chart (2017)	Peak position
Belgian Albums (Ultratop Flanders)	121
Scottish Albums (Official Charts)	63
Swiss Albums (Schweizer Hitparade)	79
US Billboard 200	149
US Top Country Albums (Billboard)	31
