= Blue Corn Music =

American independent record label

Blue Corn Music is an American blues, Americana, bluegrass, and roots music, independent record label. It was founded in 2001 by label president Denby Auble.

Blue Corn Music celebrated its 10th anniversary on June 21, 2011 at Antone's in Austin, Texas, which featured performances by label artists Ruthie Foster, Hadden Sayers, and the Austin Lounge Lizards.

== Roster ==
- Austin Lounge Lizards
- The Ballroom Thieves
- Sarah Borges
- Billy and Bryn Bright
- Adam Carroll
- Susan Cowsill
- Steve Forbert
- Guy Forsyth
- Ruthie Foster
- AJ Ghent
- Grupo Fantasma
- Caroline Herring
- David Lee Holt
- Rebecca Loebe
- Mingo Fishtrap
- Gurf Morlix
- John Nemeth
- Gary Nicholson
- Jeff Plankenhorn
- Prairie Fire
- Hadden Sayers
- South Austin Jug Band
- Two High String Band
- Wood and Wire
