= The Mavericks (1990 album) =

Studio album by the Mavericks
- Released: 1990
- Recorded: June–October 1990
- Genre: Country
- Length: 45:54
- Labels: Y&T
- Producer: The Mavericks

The Mavericks chronology
The Mavericks (1990)	From Hell to Paradise (1992)

Professional ratings
Review scores
Source	Rating
AllMusic	3/5 stars
The Encyclopedia of Popular Music	3/5 stars

The Mavericks is the first album by the American country music band the Mavericks. It was released in 1990 on the Miami, Florida-based Y&T Music label. Written entirely by the lead singer, Raul Malo, it is their only album with the guitarist Ben Peeler. "This Broken Heart", the only official single from this album, failed to chart. "I Don't Care If You Love Me Anymore" was later released on the soundtrack to the 1996 film Michael, and was a low-charting country single that year. "Mr. Jones", "The End of the Line (Jim Baker)", "This Broken Heart" and "A Better Way" were re-recorded in 1992 on the band's first major-label album From Hell to Paradise.

== Track listing ==
All songs written by Raul Malo.

1. "You'll Never Know" – 2:54
2. "The End of the Line (Jim Baker)" – 3:34
3. "This Broken Heart" – 4:16
4. "Mr. Jones" – 3:25
5. "Tomorrow Never Comes" – 3:18
6. "The Lonely Waltz" – 4:27
7. "Watch Over Me" – 2:47
8. "A Better Way" – 4:10
9. "Another Lonely Life (Paul's Song)" – 4:23
10. "I Don't Care If You Love Me Anymore" – 4:18
11. "Keep Moving On" – 3:18
12. "I'll Give You Back (When You Belong to Me)" – 4:14
13. "Strength to Say Goodbye" – 2:46

== Personnel ==
The Mavericks

- Paul Deakin- drums
- Raul Malo- acoustic guitar, electric guitar, bass guitar, piano, lead vocals
- Ben Peeler- banjo, dobro, acoustic guitar, electric guitar, steel guitar, lap steel guitar, mandolin
- Robert Reynolds- bass guitar, screams, sound effects, background vocals

Additional personnel

- Dennis Hetzendorfer- accordion
- Steve Newton- bass guitar
- Froilan Sossa- background vocals
- Debbie Spring- fiddle
- Homer Willis- harmonica
