= Hey, Good Lookin' (song) =

1951 single by Hank Williams

Single by Hank Williams With His Drifting Cowboys
- B-side: "My Heart Would Know"
- Published: June 20, 1951 Acuff-Rose Publications
- Released: June 22, 1951
- Recorded: March 16, 1951
- Studio: Castle Studio, Nashville
- Genre: Country and western, honky-tonk, country blues, proto-rockabilly
- Length: 2:57
- Label: MGM 11000
- Songwriter: Hank Williams
- Producer: Fred Rose

Hank Williams With His Drifting Cowboys singles chronology
"Howlin' at the Moon" (1951)	"Hey, Good Lookin'" (1951)	"(I Heard That) Lonesome Whistle" (1951)

"Hey, Good Lookin'" is a 1951 song written and recorded by Hank Williams, and his version was inducted into the Grammy Hall of Fame in 2001. In 2003, CMT voted the Hank Williams version number 19 on CMT's 100 Greatest Songs of Country Music. Since its original 1951 recording, it has been covered by a variety of artists.

== Background ==
The Hank Williams song "borrowed heavily" from the 1942 song with the same title written by Cole Porter for the Broadway musical Something for the Boys. The lyrics for the Williams version begin as a come on using double entendres related to food preparation ("How's about cookin' somethin' up with me?"). By the third and fourth verses, the singer is promising the object of his affection that they can become an exclusive couple ("How's about keepin' steady company?" and "I'm gonna throw my date book over the fence").

Williams was friendly with musician Jimmy Dickens. Having told Dickens that Dickens needed a hit record if he were to become a star, Williams said he would write it, and penned "Hey Good Lookin'" in only 20 minutes while on a plane with Dickens, Minnie Pearl, and Pearl's husband Henry Cannon. A week later, Williams recorded it himself, jokingly telling Dickens, "That song's too good for you!"

"Hey, Good Lookin'" was recorded on March 16, 1951, at Castle Studio in Nashville. The same session also produced the single's B-side "My Heart Would Know", as well as another pair of tunes that were released as singles: "I Can't Help It (If I'm Still in Love with You)" and "Howlin' at the Moon", released on April 27, 1951. The "Hey, Good Lookin'" single followed on June 22. Williams was backed on the session by members of his Drifting Cowboys band, including Jerry Rivers (fiddle), Don Helms (steel guitar), Sammy Pruett (electric guitar), Jack Shook (rhythm guitar), Ernie Newton or "Cedric Rainwater", also known as Howard Watts (bass), and either Owen Bradley or producer Fred Rose on piano. As author Colin Escott observes, "On one level, it seemed to point toward rock 'n' roll (hot rods, dancing sprees, goin' steady, and soda pop), but the rhythm plodded along with a steppity-step piano, and Hank sounded almost dour."

Williams performed the song on the Kate Smith Evening Hour on March 26, 1952; the appearance remains one of the few existing film clips of the singer performing live. He is introduced by Roy Acuff and banters with a young June Carter. He is wearing his famous white cowboy suit adorned in musical notes. He performed "Hey, Good Lookin'" and joined in with the rest of the cast singing his own "I Saw the Light". The rare clip displays the singer's exuberance on stage while performing an up-tempo number, and he appears at ease in the relatively new broadcast medium of television. The kinescope from this show provided the footage for the Hank Williams Jr. video "There's a Tear in My Beer" some 37 years later.

"Hey Good Lookin'"

Single by The Mavericks

from the album From Hell to Paradise
- Released: April 28, 1992
- Genre: Neotraditional country, Americana, rockabilly, country rock
- Length: 2:37
- Label: MCA
- Songwriter: Hank Williams
- Producers: Steve Fishell; Raul Malo

The Mavericks singles chronology
"Hey Good Lookin'" (1992)	"This Broken Heart" (1992)

"Hey Good Lookin'"

Single by Jimmy Buffett with Clint Black, Kenny Chesney, Alan Jackson, Toby Keith, and George Strait

from the album License to Chill
- Released: May 17, 2004
- Recorded: 2004
- Genre: Neotraditional country
- Length: 3:03
- Label: Mailboat/RCA Nashville
- Songwriter: Hank Williams
- Producers: Mac McAnally; Michael Utley

Jimmy Buffett singles chronology
"It's Five O'Clock Somewhere" (2003)	"Hey Good Lookin'" (2004)	"Trip Around the Sun" (2004)

Clint Black singles chronology
"The Boogie Man" (2004)	"Hey Good Lookin'" (2004)	"My Imagination" (2004)

Kenny Chesney singles chronology
"I Go Back" (2004)	"Hey Good Lookin'" (2004)	"The Woman with You" (2004)

Alan Jackson singles chronology
"Remember When" (2003)	"Hey Good Lookin'" (2004)	"Too Much of a Good Thing" (2004)

Toby Keith singles chronology
"Whiskey Girl" (2004)	"Hey Good Lookin'" (2004)	"Stays in Mexico" (2004)

George Strait singles chronology
"Desperately" (2004)	"Hey Good Lookin'" (2004)	"I Hate Everything" (2004)

== Notable cover versions ==
- In 1951, Jo Stafford and Frankie Laine released a cover of the song as a duet, peaking at number 21 on the Billboard Hot 100 charts.
- On his 1990 album Where There's Smoke There's Fire, Buckwheat Zydeco performs the song as a duet with Dwight Yoakam.
- Country music band the Mavericks released a cover version in 1992 from the album From Hell to Paradise. This rendition peaked at number 74 on the country singles charts.
- In 2004, Jimmy Buffett covered the song for his License to Chill album. Clint Black, Kenny Chesney, Alan Jackson, Toby Keith, and George Strait were all featured on this rendition, which peaked at number eight on the Billboard Hot Country Singles and Tracks (now Hot Country Songs) charts in 2004. It was also the last top-10 country hit for Black. This rendition was made into a music video, directed by Trey Fanjoy and Stan Kellam. The song was nominated for Best Country Collaboration With Vocals at the 47th Annual Grammy Awards.

== Chart performance ==
=== Hank Williams ===
Chart (1951)	Peak position
U.S. Billboard Hot Country Singles	1

=== The Mavericks ===
Chart (1992)	Peak position
Canada Country Singles (RPM)	73
US Hot Country Songs (Billboard)	74

=== Jimmy Buffett ===
Chart (2004)	Peak position
Canada Country (Radio & Records)	2
US Hot Country Songs (Billboard)	8
US Billboard Hot 100	63

==== Year-end charts ====
Chart (2004)	Position
US Country Songs (Billboard)	53
