= What a Crying Shame =

Studio album by The Mavericks
- Released: February 1, 1994
- Recorded: April–August 1993
- Genres: Americana; neotraditional country; Tex-Mex; western swing
- Length: 39:44
- Label: MCA Nashville
- Producer: Don Cook

The Mavericks chronology
| From Hell to Paradise (1992) | What a Crying Shame (1994) | Music for All Occasions (1995) |

Singles from O What a Crying Shame
- 1. "What a Crying Shame" Released: November 13, 1993; 2. "O What a Thrill" Released: May 14, 1994; 3. "There Goes My Heart" Released: October 1, 1994; 4. "I Should Have Been True" Released: January 28, 1995; 5. "All That Heaven Will Allow" Released: April 25, 1995

Professional ratings
Review scores
| Source | Rating |
|---|---|
| AllMusic | 5/5 stars |
| Christgau's Consumer Guide | (3-star Honorable Mention) |
| The Encyclopedia of Popular Music | 4/5 stars |
| Entertainment Weekly | B+ |
| Los Angeles Times | 3/4 stars |
| Music Week | 4/5 stars |
| Rolling Stone | 4/5 stars |
| Spin | 1/1 star |

What a Crying Shame is the third studio album by American country music band The Mavericks. The album was released on February 1, 1994, by MCA Nashville. It includes the singles "What a Crying Shame", "O What a Thrill", "There Goes My Heart", "I Should Have Been True" and "All That Heaven Will Allow". In order, these singles reached numbers 25, 18, 20, 30 and 49 on the Billboard Country Singles (now Hot Country Songs) chart. The album was certified platinum by the RIAA and 2× Platinum by the CRIA.

"All That Heaven Will Allow" was previously recorded by Bruce Springsteen on his album Tunnel of Love as was "O What a Thrill" by James House on his self-titled debut album.

== Track listing ==
| No. | Title | Writer(s) | Length |
|---|---|---|---|
| 1. | "There Goes My Heart" | Kostas, Raul Malo | 3:20 |
| 2. | "What a Crying Shame" | Kostas, Malo | 3:50 |
| 3. | "Pretend" | Kostas, Malo | 3:37 |
| 4. | "I Should Have Been True" | Stan Lynch, Malo | 5:14 |
| 5. | "The Things You Said to Me" | Al Anderson, Malo | 3:31 |
| 6. | "Just a Memory" | Kostas, Malo | 2:24 |
| 7. | "All That Heaven Will Allow" | Bruce Springsteen | 3:34 |
| 8. | "Neon Blue" | Pete Anderson, Kostas | 3:56 |
| 9. | "O What a Thrill" | Jesse Winchester | 3:13 |
| 10. | "Ain't Found Nobody" | Harlan Howard, Kostas | 3:18 |
| 11. | "The Losing Side of Me" | Malo | 3:51 |

== Production ==
- Produced by Don Cook
- Mixed and engineered by Mike Bradley

== Personnel ==
The Mavericks

- Paul Deakin – drums
- Raul Malo – lead vocals, acoustic guitar, electric guitar
- Robert Reynolds – bass guitar
- Nick Kane – (electric guitar) appears on the album cover, and is credited as a member of the band, but joined the group after the album was recorded and does not play on this record.

Additional musicians

- Bruce Bouton – steel guitar
- Dennis Burnside – string arrangements
- Mark Casstevens – acoustic guitar
- Rob Hajacos – fiddle
- James House – backing vocals on "O What a Thrill"
- John Barlow Jarvis – piano, organ
- Stan Lynch – cabasa, claves, congas, tambourine, triangle
- Brent Mason – electric guitar
- John Wesley Ryles – backing vocals
- Joy Lynn White – backing vocals on "Just a Memory"
- Dennis Wilson – backing vocals
- Glenn Worf – bass guitar, double bass
- Trisha Yearwood – backing vocals on "Neon Blue"
- Nashville String Machine – strings

== Charts ==
=== Weekly charts ===
| Chart (1994) | Peak position |
|---|---|
| Canadian Albums (RPM) | 45 |
| Canadian Country Albums (RPM) | 4 |
| US Billboard 200 | 54 |
| US Top Country Albums (Billboard) | 6 |
| US Heatseekers Albums (Billboard) | 1 |

=== Year-end charts ===
| Chart (1994) | Position |
|---|---|
| US Top Country Albums (Billboard) | 29 |
| Chart (1995) | Position |
| US Billboard 200 | 155 |
| US Top Country Albums (Billboard) | 22 |

== Certifications ==
| Region | Certification | Certified units/sales |
|---|---|---|
| Canada (Music Canada) | 2× Platinum | 200,000^{^} |
| United States (RIAA) | Platinum | 1,000,000^{^} |
^{^} Shipments figures based on certification alone.
