= The Mavericks (2003 album) =

Studio album by The Mavericks
- Released: September 23, 2003
- Recorded: February–June 2003
- Genre: Americana; neotraditional country; Tex-Mex; western swing
- Label: EMI/Sanctuary
- Producer: Kenny Greenberg; Raul Malo

The Mavericks chronology
| Trampoline (1998) | The Mavericks (2003) | In Time (2013) |

Professional ratings
Review scores
| Source | Rating |
|---|---|
| Allmusic | link |

The Mavericks is the sixth studio album by the American country music band The Mavericks. It was their only release for Sanctuary Records, and their first studio album since Trampoline in 1998. The album produced three singles in "I Want to Know", "Would You Believe" and a cover version of "The Air That I Breathe", which was made famous by The Hollies. The latter was the only single to enter the charts, peaking at number 59 on Billboard Hot Country Singles & Tracks (now Hot Country Songs). The Mavericks was the band's final studio album before they disbanded in 2003.

Also included on this album is a duet with Willie Nelson, "Time Goes By", and "In My Dreams" co-written and previously recorded by Rick Trevino on his 2003 album In My Dreams, an album which The Mavericks' lead singer Raul Malo produced. Trevino's version was also a single in 2003, peaking at #41 on the country charts.

== Track listing ==
1. "I Want to Know" (Raul Malo) – 3:31
2. "In My Dreams" (Malo, Alan Miller, Rick Trevino) – 4:42
3. "Shine Your Light" (Malo) – 3:45
4. "I'm Wondering" (Malo, Dale Watson) – 3:15
5. "By the Time" (Malo, Alan Miller, Jaime Hanna) – 4:35
6. "Would You Believe" (Malo, Alan Miller) – 5:24
7. "Too Lonely" (Malo, Alan Miller) – 3:06
8. "Time Goes By" (Malo, Alan Miller, Hanna) – 4:37
9. "San Jose" (Malo, Alan Miller) – 3:35
10. "Because of You" (Malo, Alan Miller, Hanna, Trevino) – 3:33
11. "The Air That I Breathe" (Albert Hammond, Mike Hazlewood) – 4:01

== Personnel ==
=== The Mavericks ===
- Paul Deakin- drums
- Raul Malo- acoustic guitar, electric guitar, melodica, lead vocals
- Eddie "Scarlito" Perez- electric guitar, background vocals
- Robert Reynolds- bass guitar, background vocals

=== Additional musicians ===
- Jimmy Bowland- alto saxophone
- Glen Caruba- percussion
- Eric Darken- percussion
- David Davidson- concertmaster
- Chris Dunn- trombone
- Kenny Greenberg- electric guitar
- Jannelle Guillot- speaking part
- Don Hart- string arrangements
- John Hobbs- keyboards
- Jim Hoke- horn arrangements, tenor saxophone
- Bill Huber- trombone
- Love Sponge Orchestra- strings
- Doug Moffet- baritone saxophone
- Gordon Mote- keyboards, mellotron
- Willie Nelson- vocals on "Time Goes By"
- Matt Nygren- horn arrangements, trumpet
- Frolian Sossa- background vocals
- Debbie Spring- fiddle
- Jim Williamson- trumpet
- Glenn Worf- upright bass

== Chart performance ==
| Chart (2003) | Peak position |
|---|---|
| U.S. Billboard Top Country Albums | 32 |
