= Trampoline (The Mavericks album) =

Studio album by the Mavericks
- Released: March 10, 1998
- Recorded: August–December 1997
- Genres: Americana; Tex-Mex; western swing; neotraditional country
- Length: 52:36
- Label: MCA Nashville
- Producers: Don Cook; Raul Malo

The Mavericks chronology
Music for All Occasions (1995)	Trampoline (1998)	Super Colossal Smash Hits of the 90's: The Best of The Mavericks (1999)

Singles from Trampoline
- 1. "Dance the Night Away" Released: March 10, 1998

Professional ratings
Review scores
Source	Rating
AllMusic	4.5/5 stars
Christgau's Consumer Guide	(dud)
The Encyclopedia of Popular Music	4/5 stars
Entertainment Weekly	A−
Houston Press	4/5 stars
Rolling Stone	4/5 stars

Trampoline is the fifth studio album by the American country music band the Mavericks. The album was released on March 10, 1998, by MCA Nashville. It includes the singles "To Be with You", "Dance the Night Away" and "I've Got This Feeling". Although none of these singles were Top 40 hits on the U.S. country charts, "Dance the Night Away" reached number 4 on the UK Singles Chart and "I've Got This Feeling" reached number 27.

== Track listing ==
CD
No.	Title	Writer(s)	Length
1.	"Dance the Night Away"	Raul Malo	4:22
2.	"Tell Me Why"	Malo	3:47
3.	"I Should Know"	Al Anderson, Malo	3:07
4.	"Someone Should Tell Her"	Anderson, Malo	3:05
5.	"To Be with You"	James House, Malo	3:50
6.	"I've Got This Feeling"	Jaime Hanna, Malo	3:45
7.	"Fool #1"	Anderson, Malo	5:45
8.	"I Don't Even Know Your Name"	Paul Deakin, Nick Kane, Malo, Jerry Dale McFadden, Robert Reynolds	3:08
9.	"I Hope You Want Me Too"	Kenny Alphin, Hanna	4:53
10.	"Melbourne Mambo"	Malo	4:13
11.	"Dolores"	Malo	3:48
12.	"Save a Prayer"	Malo	5:06
13.	"Dream River"	Kostas, Malo	3:47
Total length:			52:36

European edition bonus tracks
No.	Title	Writer(s)	Length
14.	"All I Get"	Nick Lowe, Malo	4:09
15.	"La Mucara"	Traditional	6:05
Total length:			63:09

Japan edition bonus tracks
No.	Title	Writer(s)	Length
14.	"All I Get"	Nick Lowe, Malo	4:09
15.	"Panatella"	Kane	2:41
16.	"She Does"	Malo	3:03
17.	"La Mucara"	Traditional	6:05
Total length:			68:34

== Personnel ==
As listed in liner notes.

The Mavericks

- Paul Deakin – drums, electric guitar
- Nick Kane – electric guitar, acoustic guitar, 12-string guitar, baritone guitar
- Raul Malo – lead vocals, background vocals, acoustic guitar, electric guitar, high-strung acoustic guitar, gut string guitar, electric sitar, six-string bass guitar, acoustic piano, drums
- Robert Reynolds – background vocals, upright bass, bass guitar

Additional musicians

- Robert Bailey – background vocals
- Richard Bennett – requinto guitar
- Dane Bryant – acoustic piano
- Dennis Burnside – acoustic piano
- Glenn Caruba – percussion
- Mark Casstevens – acoustic guitar, gut string guitar, archtop guitar, banjo
- Jeff Coffin – saxophone
- Chris Dunn – trombone
- Kim Fleming – background vocals
- Dennis Good – trombone
- Vicki Hampton – background vocals
- "Father" David Hungate – upright bass
- James House – acoustic guitar
- Don Jackson – saxophone
- Sam Levine – saxophone, flute
- Jerry Dale McFadden – background vocals, Hammond B-3 organ, acoustic piano, Vox Jaguar, Wurlitzer piano
- Farrell Morris – percussion, vibraphone
- Dennis Solee – saxophone, flute, clarinet
- George Tidwell – trumpet
- Robby Turner – pedal steel guitar
- Jim Williamson – trumpet

Strings performed by the Nashville String Machine. Strings and horns arranged by Dennis Burnside and Raul Malo. Conducted by Dennis Burnside.

Production

- Produced by Raul Malo and Don Cook
- Engineers: Mike Bradley, Mark Capps
- Assistant engineers: Glenn Spinner, Aaron Swihart
- Mixing: Mike Bradley
- Mix assistants: Mark Capps, Aaron Swihart
- Mastering: Hank Williams

== Charts ==
=== Weekly charts ===
Chart (1998)	Peak position
Austrian Albums (Ö3 Austria)	42
Belgian Albums (Ultratop Flanders)	36
Canadian Albums (RPM)	43
Canadian Country Albums (RPM)	3
Dutch Albums (Album Top 100)	25
German Albums (Offizielle Top 100)	96
New Zealand Albums (RMNZ)	10
Norwegian Albums (VG-lista)	37
Scottish Albums (Official Charts)	5
Swedish Albums (Sverigetopplistan)	47
UK Albums (Official Charts)	10
US Billboard 200	96
US Top Country Albums (Billboard)	9

=== Year-end charts ===
Chart (1998)	Position
Dutch Albums (Album Top 100)	99
New Zealand Albums (RMNZ)	36
UK Albums (OCC)	38
US Top Country Albums (Billboard)	67

== Certifications ==
Region	Certification	Certified units/sales
Canada (Music Canada)	Gold	50,000^{^}
^{^} Shipments figures based on certification alone.
