= Howlin' at the Moon =

1951 single by Hank Williams

Single by Hank Williams With His Drifting Cowboys
- B-side: "I Can't Help It (If I'm Still in Love with You)"
- Published: April 23, 1951
- Released: May 1951
- Recorded: March 16, 1951
- Studio: Castle Studio, Nashville
- Venue: Acuff-Rose Publications
- Genre: Hillbilly, Honky-tonk, Country blues
- Length: 2:42
- Label: MGM 10961
- Songwriter: Hank Williams
- Producer: Fred Rose

Hank Williams With His Drifting Cowboys singles chronology
"Cold, Cold Heart" (1951)	"Howlin' at the Moon" (1951)	"Hey Good Lookin'" (1951)

"Howlin' at the Moon" is a song written and recorded by Hank Williams. It rose to number 3 on the Hot Country Singles chart in 1951. The song also appeared on the soundtrack of alternate history TV series, For All Mankind.

== Song history ==
The up-tempo "Howlin' at the Moon" celebrates the giddiness of true love. Lyrically, the song reflects Williams' sense of humor and love of hunting. The title is punctuated by the hound dog yodels of fiddler Jerry Rivers. In his book Hank Williams: The Biography, writer Colin Escott observes, "The performance tears along...It was but a short step from there to rockabilly." Williams recorded the song at Castle Studio in Nashville on March 16, 1951. Williams was backed on the session by members of his Drifting Cowboys band, including: Jerry Rivers (fiddle), Don Helms (steel guitar), Sammy Pruett (electric guitar), Jack Shook (rhythm guitar), Ernie Newton (or "Cedric Rainwater") a.k.a. Howard Watts (bass), and either Owen Bradley or producer Fred Rose on piano. The B-side of "Howlin' at the Moon", the ballad "I Can't Help It (If I'm Still in Love with You)", outperformed the A-side on the charts (peaking at number 2).

Williams disciple George Jones recorded this song for his 1960 album George Jones Salutes Hank Williams.

== Chart performance ==
Chart (1951)	Peak position
U.S. Billboard Hot Country Singles	3

== Bibliography ==
- Escott, Colin (2004). Hank Williams: The Biography. Back Bay. ISBN 0-316-73497-7.
