= In Time (The Mavericks album) =

Studio album by the Mavericks
- Released: February 26, 2013
- Genres: Americana; neotraditional country; Tex-Mex; western swing
- Length: 56:44
- Label: Valory/Big Machine
- Producers: Niko Bolas; Raul Malo

The Mavericks chronology
The Mavericks (2003)	In Time (2013)	Mono (2015)

Singles from In Time
- 1. "Born to Be Blue" Released: May 29, 2012; 2. "Back in Your Arms Again" Released: February 2013

In Time is the seventh studio album by the American band the Mavericks, released on February 26, 2013, on the Valory Music Group label, which is owned by Big Machine Records. The album was produced by Niko Bolas and Raul Malo. The album has achieved praise from the critics and according to Metacritic has garnered "universal acclaim".

The vinyl LP version of the record was pressed by United Record Pressing in Nashville, Tennessee.

The band released a video for the song "Back in Your Arms Again".

== Reception ==
=== Commercial ===
In Time reached No. 8 on the Billboard Country Albums chart and No. 39 on the Billboard 200, selling 14,000 copies in its debut week. The album has sold 75,000 copies in the US as of February 2015.

=== Critical ===
Professional ratings
Aggregate scores
Source	Rating
Metacritic	86/100
Review scores
Source	Rating
AllMusic	4/5 stars
American Songwriter	4.5/5 stars
Daily Breeze	3.5/4 stars
The Huffington Post	3.5/4 stars
Los Angeles Times	4/4 stars
The Oakland Press	3.5/4 stars
Paste	7.8/10
The Philadelphia Inquirer	3.5/4 stars
PopMatters	8/10
USA Today	3.5/4 stars

In Time received mostly positive reviews from the music critics. At Metacritic, which assigns a normalized rating out of 100 to reviews from mainstream critics, the album received an average score of 86, based on 10 reviews, which indicates "universal acclaim". The album has garnered all positive reviews, and those are from AllMusic, American Songwriter, Daily Breeze, The Huffington Post, Los Angeles Times, Lincoln Journal Star, The Oakland Press, Paste, The Philadelphia Inquirer, The Plain Dealer, PopMatters, The Salt Lake Tribune, Tampa Bay Times and the USA Today.

The top perfect rating for the album came from the Los Angeles Times, whose Randy Lewis rated the album a four-star, and proclaimed "the genre-busting band embodies the very best of the melting-pot experience that's a fundamental component of the American character...and they've captured a sound as tangibly uplifting as pop music gets. The Mavericks are back and indeed, just in time." Just a step below are American Songwriter, Daily Breeze, The Huffington Post, The Oakland Press The Philadelphia Inquirer and USA Today. Hal Horowitz of American Songwriter rated the album a four-and-a-half-star effort, and affirmed that the album "is as powerful and timeless as anything they have done, which is saying plenty". Sam Gnerre of Daily Breeze rated it three-and-a-half-stars-out-of-four album, and noted, "The Mavericks have made falling back into the groove after a long layoff sound effortless on 'In Time,' an album that sounds as rich and full as anything the band has ever done." Michael Giltz of The Huffington Post rated the album three-and-a-half-stars-out-of-four, and commented, "The music builds and builds to the rousing, demanding chorus that draws on everything from Elvis to Johnny Cash to south of the border via the accordion and the band and singer trade off refrains and the music builds again to a crescendo, a thunderous stop... and then launches back again into the chorus. It's the Mavericks at their best." Gary Graff of The Oakland Press rated it three-and-a-half-stars-out-of-four album, and called the project a "sublimely eclectic new 14-song set". Nick Cristiano of The Philadelphia Inquirer rated it three-and-a-half-stars-out-of-four album, writing, "With In Time, they pick up right where they left off - that is, weaving a vibrant tapestry of sound that soars gloriously behind the borders of country music, where they began." Elysa Gardner of USA Today rated it three-and-a-half-stars-out-of-four, and said that the album has a "mix torch and twang with a vibrant virtuosity that defies genre boundaries".

The least positive reviews came from AllMusic, Paste and PopMatters. Steve Leggett of AllMusic wrote, "To say this album is a return to form wouldn't be quite correct. It's an extension of it." He added that the album is "a further step away from anything resembling a mainstream country release, incorporating not only the Tex-Mex and Cuban influences the band was known for, but also the rhythms of polkas, tangos, and all manner of approaches, making them closer to a band like Los Lobos than to Tim McGraw or Jason Aldean, or whoever passes for the face of country music these days. Malo co-produced this set (with Niko Bolas), and he wrote or co-wrote all of the songs here, and his versatile and incredible vocals are, as they should be, the center of everything" Holly Gleason of Paste wrote that the band is "still defying classification and utterly festive". Steve Horowitz of PopMatters rated the album eight-out-of-ten-stars, and commented, "The music is far from ironic. The Mavericks sing and play as if time mattered—every second is precious. There are no wasted words or melodies, noodling frills or mindless riffs. Everything is present for a reason; to create an effect or sustain a mood." He continued, "The musicianship matters and is impeccably performed," and "Everything will happen in time, that’s the message here."

The graded reviews for this album came in from the Lincoln Journal Star, The Plain Dealer, The Salt Lake Tribune and Tampa Bay Times. Chuck Yarborough of The Plain Dealer graded the album an (A+), and said that "THAT magic remains" with the band on this album. David Burger of The Salt Lake Tribune graded the album (A), and asserted that "'In Time', resurrects the best ingredients of the 'country' band that began in Miami and embraced a style that not only honored Buck Owens and Patsy Cline but incorporated Tex-Mex as well as dynamic Cuban rhythms." Burger commented that "Front and center is one of the best singers in any genre of music — the powerful Raul Malo — and while not all the subject matter is 100-percent unbridled optimism, the music certainly is, with an explosion of danceable sound that turns the two-step into exponentially infinite steps. The mood is electric, the band sounds not just refreshed but rejuvenated." Sean Daly of the Tampa Bay Times graded the album (A), and said that "Malo's restlessness and eclecticism probably cost the band bigger success and a smoother history. But from the sound of the new stuff, the four other guys in the band have come to terms with his wanderlust, as Malo had a hand in writing all 14 tracks, making In Time predictably unpredictable". Daily called the album "unpredictably awesome". The Lincoln Journal Star graded the album (B+) and praised the album as "a good one" that contains "rockabilly, honky tonk and Latin music, creating a distinctive brand of post-modern country soul that is oft carried by Malo’s soaring, Roy Orbison-esque voice."

== Track listing ==
No.	Title	Writer(s)	Length
1.	"Back in Your Arms Again"	Raul Malo; Gary Nicholson; Seth Walker	4:20
2.	"Lies"	Malo; Al Anderson; Bob DiPiero	3:33
3.	"Born to Be Blue"	Malo; James House	3:30
4.	"Come Unto Me"	Malo	4:28
5.	"In Another's Arms"	Malo	3:32
6.	"Fall Apart"	Malo	3:06
7.	"All Over Again"	Anderson; Malo	3:57
8.	"Forgive Me"	Malo; Liz Rodrigues	3:21
9.	"Amsterdam Moon"	Malo	2:38
10.	"That's Not My Name"	Malo; Wally Wilson	3:07
11.	"As Long as There's Loving Tonight"	Malo; Walker; Alan Miller	3:25
12.	"Dance in the Moonlight"	Malo; Miller; Eddie Perez	5:05
13.	"(Call Me) When You Get to Heaven"	Malo	8:16
14.	"Ven Hacia Mi [Come Unto Me]"	Malo	4:26
Total length:			56:44

== Chart performance ==
=== Weekly charts ===
Chart (2013)	Peak position
US Billboard 200	39
US Top Country Albums (Billboard)	8

=== Year-end charts ===
Chart (2013)	Position
US Top Country Albums (Billboard)	70

=== Singles ===
Year	Single	Peak positions
Year	Single	US Country
2012	"Born to Be Blue"	46
2013	"Back in Your Arms Again"	—
"—" denotes releases that did not chart
