= O What a Thrill =

Single by The Mavericks

from the album What a Crying Shame
- B-side: "Ain't Found Nobody"
- Released: May 14, 1994
- Genre: Country
- Length: 3:13
- Label: MCA
- Songwriter: Jesse Winchester
- Producer: Don Cook

The Mavericks singles chronology
"What a Crying Shame" (1993)	"O What a Thrill" (1994)	"There Goes My Heart" (1994)

"O What a Thrill" is a song written by Jesse Winchester. It was originally recorded by James House for his 1989 self-titled debut album.

It was later released as a single by American country music group The Mavericks. It was released in May 1994 as the second single from the album What a Crying Shame. The song reached number 18 on the Billboard Hot Country Singles & Tracks chart. The Mavericks' version features House on backing vocals.

== Chart performance ==
Chart (1994)	Peak position
Canada Country Singles (RPM)	7
US Hot Country Songs (Billboard)	18

=== Year-end charts ===
Chart (1994)	Position
Canada Country Tracks (RPM)	91
