= What a Crying Shame (song) =

Single by The Mavericks

from the album What a Crying Shame
- B-side: "The Things You Said to Me"
- Released: November 1993
- Genre: Neotraditional country
- Length: 3:50
- Label: MCA
- Songwriters: Raul Malo, Kostas
- Producer: Don Cook

The Mavericks singles chronology
"I Got You" (1992)	"What a Crying Shame" (1993)	"O What a Thrill" (1994)

"What a Crying Shame" is a song written by Raul Malo and Kostas, and recorded by American country music group The Mavericks. It was released in November 1993 as the first single and title track from the album of the same name. The song reached number 25 on the Billboard Hot Country Singles & Tracks chart and peaked at number 6 on the RPM Country Tracks in Canada.

== Music video ==
The music video was directed by Roger Pistole and premiered in December 1993.

== Chart performance ==
"What a Crying Shame" debuted at number 75 on the U.S. Billboard Hot Country Singles & Tracks for the week of January 1, 1994.

Chart (1993–1994)	Peak position
Canada Country Singles (RPM)	6
US Hot Country Songs (Billboard)	25

=== Year-end charts ===
Chart (1994)	Position
Canada Country Tracks (RPM)	80
