= The Mavericks =

American band

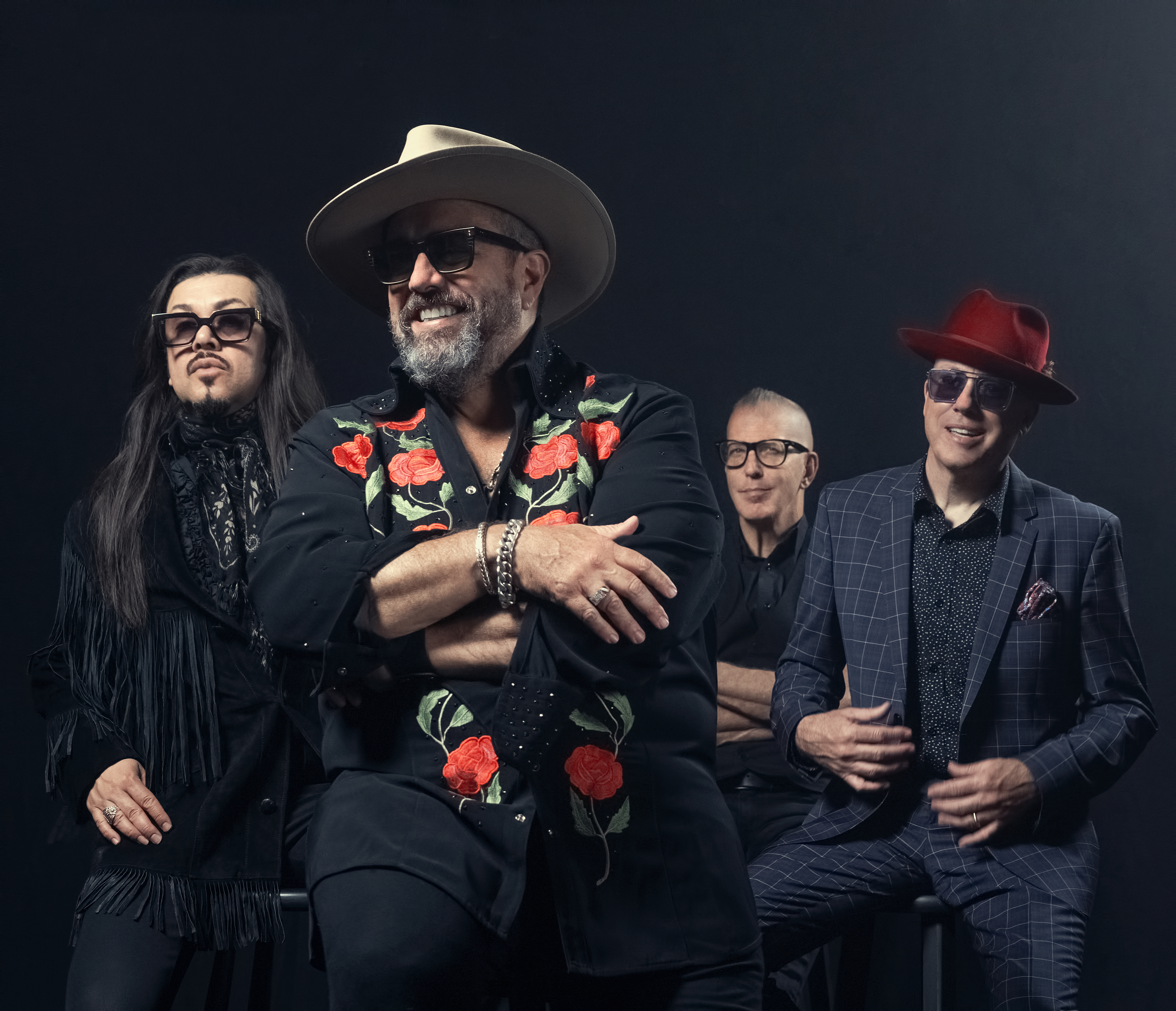
- The Mavericks in 2020 (from left to right: Eddie Perez, Raul Malo, Paul Deakin, and Jerry Dale McFadden)

Background information
- Origin: Miami, Florida, U.S.
- Genres: Country; alternative country; country rock; Americana; Tex-Mex
- Years active: 1989–2000, 2003–2004, 2011–present
- Labels: Y&T; MCA Nashville; Mercury; Sanctuary; Valory; Mono Mundo
- Members: Paul Deakin; Eddie Perez; Jerry Dale McFadden
- Past members: Raul Malo; Ben Peeler; David Lee Holt; Nick Kane; Robert Reynolds
- Website: themavericksband.com

The Mavericks are an American band formed in Miami in 1989. The original lineup consisted of Raul Malo (lead vocals, guitar), Paul Deakin (drums), Robert Reynolds (bass guitar), and Ben Peeler (lead guitar). After one independent album, the band was signed by MCA Nashville Records and David Lee Holt replaced Peeler on lead guitar; he would be replaced by Nick Kane shortly after their second MCA album and third overall 1994's What a Crying Shame. The band recorded a total of four albums for MCA and one for Mercury Records before disbanding in 2000. They reunited for one album in 2003 on Sanctuary Records, by which point Eddie Perez had become their fourth guitarist, and former touring keyboardist Jerry Dale McFadden became an official fifth member. The lineup of Malo, Deakin, Reynolds, Perez, and McFadden reunited a second time in 2012 for a series of new albums, first on Big Machine Records' Valory imprint and then on Mono Mundo. Reynolds was fired in 2014 and Ed Friedland served as touring bassist until 2023, with Malo briefly taking over on bass before Scotty Huff joined as touring bassist in 2024. Following Malo's death from colon cancer in 2025, the Mavericks began touring again in 2026 with James Otto and Emily West as guest vocalists.

The Mavericks have charted 15 times on the American Billboard Hot Country Songs charts; their highest-peaking single there is "All You Ever Do Is Bring Me Down", a collaboration with accordionist Flaco Jiménez which reached number 13 in 1996. Three of their singles made top 10 on the country music charts of the defunct RPM magazine in Canada, and "Dance the Night Away" was a hit single in the United Kingdom in 1998. Their most commercially successful album What a Crying Shame has been certified platinum in the United States and double-platinum in Canada. In addition, the band has received one Grammy Award, two Country Music Association awards, and three Academy of Country Music awards. Their sound is defined by a wide variety of musical styles outside of country music, such as Tejano, Latin, Americana, and the pop music of the 1950s, with particular emphasis on Malo's singing voice.

== History ==
The Mavericks were founded in Miami in 1989. Lead vocalist and guitarist Raul Malo met bass guitarist Robert Reynolds, a native of Kansas City, Missouri, when both were performing in local bands. The two of them developed a friendship after realizing that they both shared interest in musicians such as Roy Orbison, Elvis Presley, and Johnny Cash, and decided to form their own band. Paul Deakin, a friend of Reynolds and native of Ohio, was chosen as drummer. Completing the original lineup was lead guitarist Ben Peeler, a native of Jackson, Mississippi. They immediately began touring throughout the Miami area, primarily at venues that typically booked rock bands. This was because the band wanted to perform original songs, while most of the country music-themed venues at the time preferred acts that performed cover songs instead. In late 1990, The Mavericks released their self-titled debut album on a local independent label called Y&T Music. Malo wrote every song on the album.

=== 1992–1993: From Hell to Paradise ===
Due to the independent album's success throughout the Miami music community, the band was invited to perform for a showcase in Nashville, Tennessee, at which talent scouts for major country music labels were present. One of these labels, MCA Nashville, signed the band in May 1991. According to Colin Larkin in the Virgin Encyclopedia of Country Music, the band was signed before they had finished their soundcheck. Peeler was fired from his role as guitarist in October 1991 due to concerns from the other three band members and their then-manager Frank Callari that his playing was not suitable for a country music band. He was replaced by David Lee Holt, a session musician who had also played for Joe Ely and Carlene Carter. After Holt joined, the band began recording their first MCA album From Hell to Paradise at Miami-based Criteria Studios late in 1991. Malo wrote the title track, which was about his parents emigrating from Cuba to the United States. He co-produced it with guitarists Richard Bennett and Steve Fishell, both of whom also played on the album. The album was released in May 1992 and charted one single a month later: a cover of Hank Williams' "Hey Good Lookin'", which the band took to number 74 on Billboard Hot Country Songs. Sandra Schulman of the South Florida Sun-Sentinel wrote that this album "reflected their Miami roots with social issues of homelessness and immigrant rights shoehorned in with the boot-kicking country ballads". Rating it "B+", Alanna Nash of Entertainment Weekly wrote that "Some of the group's writing could use a finer bead, but the Mavericks earn major points for integrating the hillbilly heart of the masters with the consciousness and muscle of the contemporary generation."

Holt quit the band after only one album. Dale Martin, music reviewer for The Victoria Advocate, attributed Holt's departure to "friction of some sort". Conversely, Karen Essex of New Country magazine stated that Holt left amicably. After leaving The Mavericks, Holt would become a founding member of the blues rock band Storyville. In 1993, The Mavericks chose Bill Dwyer to fill in on lead guitar while on tour in Europe. Reynolds told Mike Cooper of The Hard Report in July of that year that the band did not yet know who would replace Holt.

=== 1994–1995: What a Crying Shame ===
The Mavericks' next MCA release was 1994's What a Crying Shame. This was also their first to be produced by Don Cook, best known for his work with Brooks & Dunn. By the time of the album's release, Reynolds had selected Nick Kane, another friend of his, to become the band's third guitarist. Although Kane was pictured on the album's liner notes and in promotional material, the project was completed before his joining. As a result, Bruce Bouton and Mark Casstevens of Garth Brooks' studio band The G-Men played guitar on the album alongside session guitarist Brent Mason. It was also at this point that keyboardist Jerry Dale McFadden began accompanying the band in concerts. Malo wrote four of the album's ten songs with Greek-American songwriter Kostas, best known for his work with Patty Loveless and Dwight Yoakam. Three months before the album's release, Reynolds married country singer Trisha Yearwood; she, along with James House and Joy Lynn White, contributed backing vocals. Mark Deming of AllMusic thought that Cook's production was "glossier" than the preceding albums, also stating that they "fully hit their stride with...the band's blend of rootsy country and vintage pop sounds".

What a Crying Shame produced a total of five singles, four of which made the top 40 on the Billboard country singles charts. First was "What a Crying Shame", one of the songs which Malo and Kostas co-wrote. The song was initially unsuccessful at radio, but Malo insisted that the label keep promoting it through the Christmas season of late 1993-early 1994, after which it began ascending the airplay charts. As a result, it reached a peak of number 25 in early 1994. After it was a cover of Jesse Winchester's "O What a Thrill", which would become the most successful single off the album with a number 18 peak on the country charts. It was followed by "There Goes My Heart", "I Should Have Been True", and a cover of Bruce Springsteen's "All That Heaven Will Allow". "What a Crying Shame" and "O What a Thrill" both made top 10 on RPM Country Tracks, then the main country music chart published in Canada. (Note: RPM ceased publication in November 2000.) In February 1995, What a Crying Shame was certified platinum by the Recording Industry Association of America (RIAA) for shipments of one million copies. In Canada, the album was certified double-platinum by the Canadian Recording Industry Association (now Music Canada), a certification which at the time honored shipments of 200,000 copies in that country. (Note: In May 2008, Music Canada reduced the qualification for double-platinum sales from 200,000 to 160,000.)

The commercial success of What a Crying Shame also led to the first of several industry award nominations for the band. The title track earned the band their first Grammy Award nomination at the 37th Annual Grammy Awards in 1995, in the category of Best Country Performance by a Duo or Group with Vocal. The Academy of Country Music also awarded the band as Top Vocal Group and Top New Vocal Duet or Group in 1994; they would win the former again in 1995 and be nominated a third time for it in 1996. In mid-1995, The Mavericks covered Richard Rodgers and Lorenz Hart's 1934 standard "Blue Moon" for the soundtrack of the film Apollo 13.

=== 1995–1997: Music for All Occasions ===
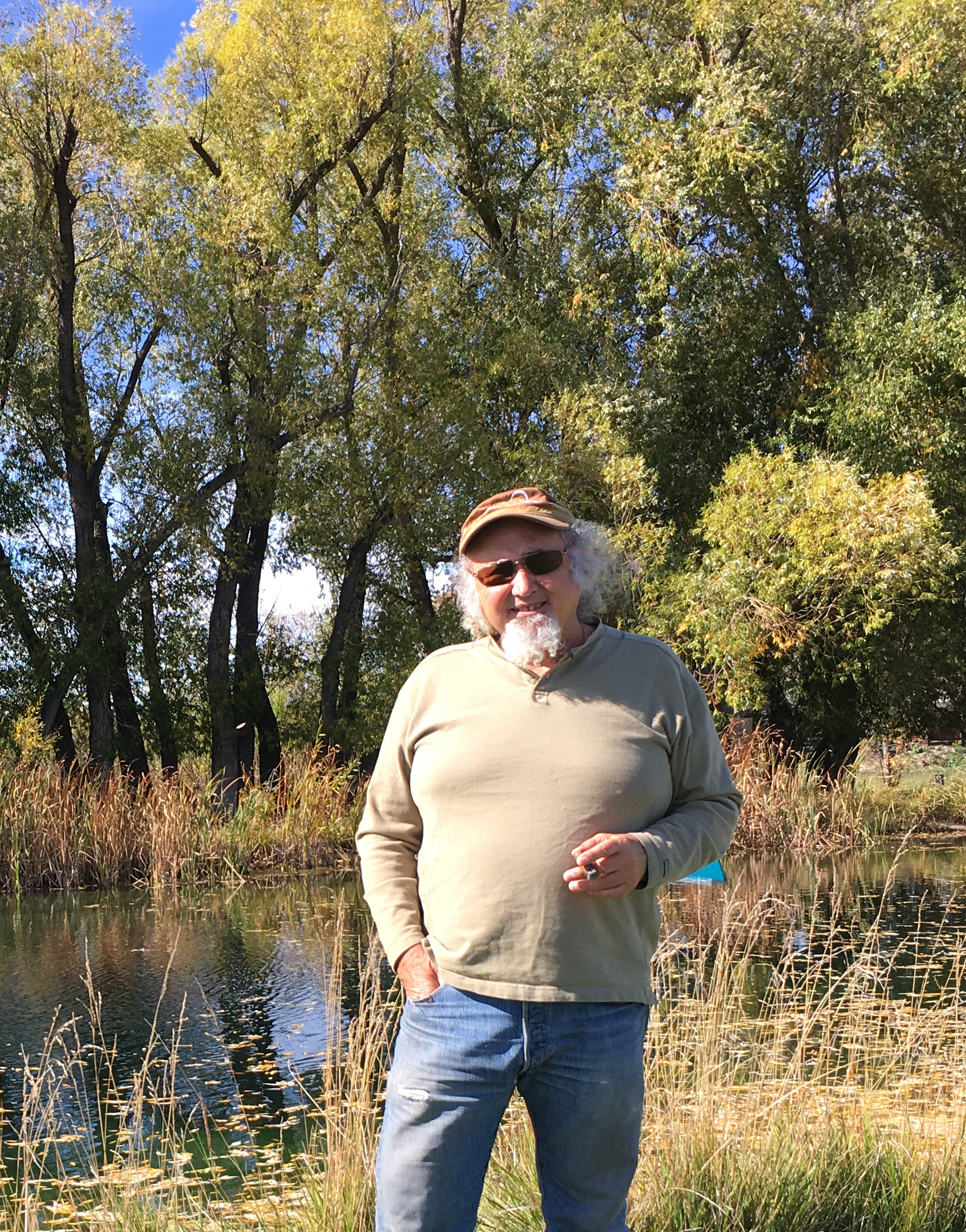
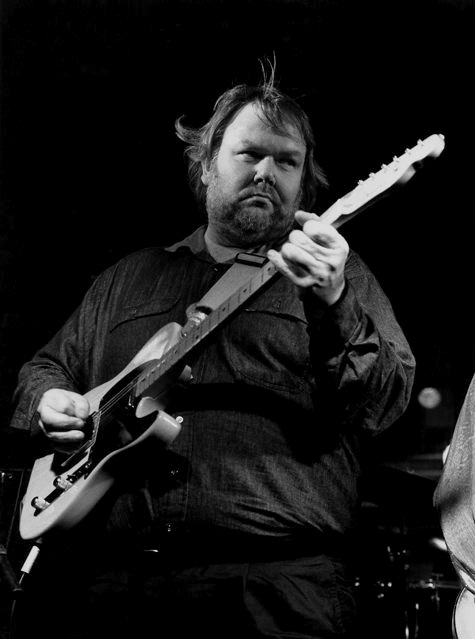
Kostas (left) and Al Anderson (right) have written singles for The Mavericks.

MCA released the band's next album Music for All Occasions in 1995. The album was led off by the single "Here Comes the Rain", which charted at 22 on Hot Country Songs that year. "Here Comes the Rain" was their most successful single in Canada, peaking at number 4 on RPM Country Tracks. Its follow-up was "All You Ever Do Is Bring Me Down", a collaboration with Tejano accordionist Flaco Jiménez. The song peaked at number 13 on Hot Country Songs in 1996, representing not only The Mavericks' highest peak on that chart, but also Jiménez's only appearance on it. Despite this, the follow-up single "Missing You" failed to make top 40. Malo wrote nine of the 11 songs on the album, including all three singles. He collaborated with Kostas on "Here Comes the Rain" and with former NRBQ member Al Anderson on the other two. Also included on the album was a collaboration with Trisha Yearwood on a cover of Frank Sinatra and Nancy Sinatra's 1967 single "Somethin' Stupid". Yearwood, along with Shelby Lynne and Lari White, also sang backing vocals on the track "Foolish Heart". Nash described the Sinatra cover as "kitsch", but otherwise praised Malo's voice and the musical variety. Rick Harmon of the Montgomery Advertiser called the album "more subtle" than its predecessor, highlighting the singles in particular and considering the Sinatra cover superior to the original song. Similarly, Mark Deming of AllMusic wrote that it was "a slyer, more subtle affair" compared to What a Crying Shame, and added that "the record's abundant pleasures become clear upon repeated listenings". Joel Bernstein of Country Standard Time noted that the band did not "play it safe", praising "All You Ever Do Is Bring Me Down" and "Somethin' Stupid" in particular.

In 1996, Music for All Occasions was certified gold by the RIAA for shipments of 500,000 copies. At the 38th Grammy Awards in February 1996, Music for All Occasions was nominated for Grammy Award for Best Country Album, while "Here Comes the Rain" won Best Country Performance by a Duo or Group with Vocal; one year later, "All You Ever Do Is Bring Me Down" was nominated in the same category. Despite the commercial success of the album, Deakin was critical of its overall sound, saying that "there was little vibe to it" and that he considered "All You Ever Do Is Bring Me Down" to be its only good song. After this album's release, The Mavericks contributed the original composition "I Don't Care (If You Love Me Anymore)" to the soundtrack of the 1996 Nora Ephron film Michael; the song would also receive a Grammy Award nomination for Best Country Performance by a Duo or Group with Vocal in 1997. The Country Music Association nominated the band for Vocal Group of the Year for four consecutive years between 1995 and 1998. They would win this award in both 1995 and 1996.

=== 1997–1999: Trampoline ===
The band went on a touring and recording hiatus starting in December 1996. The only exception was a live album called It's Now! It's Live!, composed of earlier concert recordings and released only in Canada in 1997. During this hiatus, Malo performed solo shows throughout Nashville; these focused on pop standards from the 1930s to the 1950s. Accompanying him at these shows was a nine-piece band assembled by session musician Dennis Burnside. In May 1997, Malo also previewed new songs at live sessions from the Bluebird Café, a venue in Nashville which is frequented by songwriters. Accompanying him was Jaime Hanna, son of Nitty Gritty Dirt Band founder Jeff Hanna. Jaime Hanna would also go on to tour with The Mavericks as a backup musician. The band's hiatus ended in early 1998 with the release of their next studio album Trampoline. Contributing songwriters to Trampoline once again included Malo, Kostas, House, and Anderson; another contributing writer for this album was Big Kenny, later one-half of Big & Rich. Deakin told the North County Times that the album was recorded in only one week, and unlike their previous albums, did not include any overdubbing. After the album's release, the band toured throughout Scandinavia in support.

Writing for Entertainment Weekly, Scott Schnider described Malo's singing voice favorably, also noting influences of samba and soul music in the album's tracks. John D. Buchanan of AllMusic wrote that "Easily the group's most musically ambitious set to date, Trampoline's blend of pop and Latin textures didn't connect with the mainstream country audience in the United States". The album charted only two singles in the United States: "To Be with You" and "Dance the Night Away", neither reaching top 40 on Hot Country Songs. The latter was more successful in the United Kingdom, reaching number four on the UK Singles Chart in 1998. Its success led to two more singles charting in that country: "I've Got This Feeling" and "Someone Should Tell Her". "Dance the Night Away" was also the band's fifth and final Grammy Award nomination for Best Country Performance by a Duo or Group with Vocal. Following this album's failure in the United States, The Mavericks left MCA Nashville in 1999; Deakin told the website Country Standard Time in 2000 that the band chose to leave MCA in favor of Mercury Records because many of the executives who had supported the band during their commercial peak earlier in the decade were no longer active at the label. Malo told the same publication in 2003, "That's part of the problem of being signed to a major label in Nashville. When you venture outside the box, you're pretty much sealing your fate."

=== 1999–2003: Super Colossal Smash Hits of the 90's: The Best of the Mavericks, disbanding, and first reunion ===
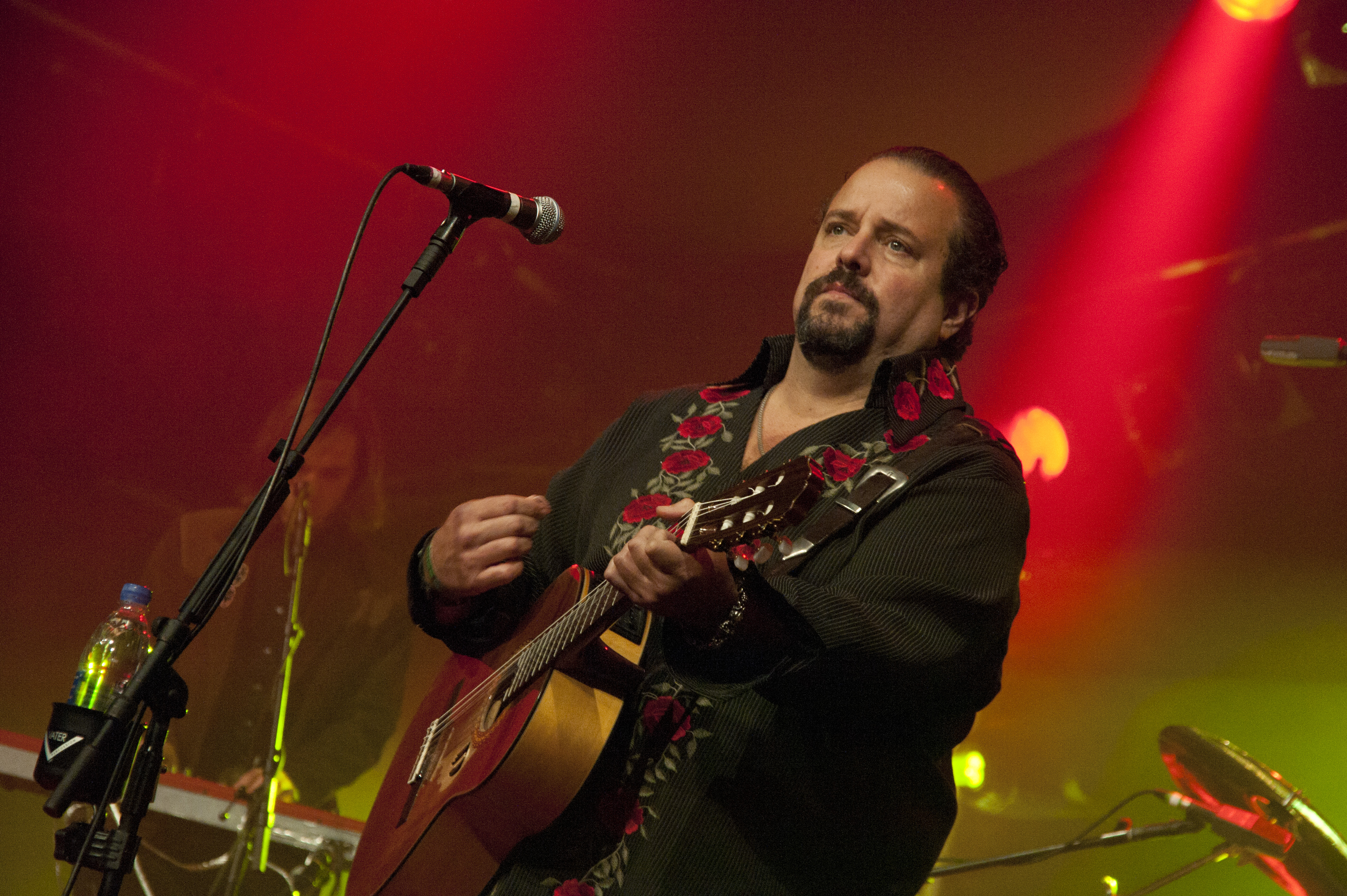
Lead singer Raul Malo in 2011.

The band's only release for Mercury was a greatest hits compilation called Super Colossal Smash Hits of the 90's: The Best of The Mavericks. They chose to release a greatest-hits album due to their recognition in Europe, where they found that such compilations tended to be commercially successful. For this project, each band member selected both singles and album cuts, along with four previously unreleased songs. Among the new songs were covers of Buck Owens' "Think of Me" and Cat Stevens' "Here Comes My Baby", the latter released as a single. Super Colossal Smash Hits of the 90's was certified gold in the United Kingdom by the British Phonographic Industry (BPI) for sales of 100,000 copies. Despite the commercial success in other countries, the band continued to find lessened success in the United States. Also in 1999, Reynolds divorced Yearwood; she would marry Garth Brooks in 2005. By the end of the decade, the Mavericks had disbanded. Buchanan said that the band was "at loggerheads with their record company". Malo stated at the time that the decision to disband was due to creative exhaustion brought on by extensive touring, combined with unspecified disputes between Kane and the rest of the band.

After the disbanding, Kane released a solo album of cover songs in 2000 titled Songs in the Key of E. Malo recorded both as a solo artist and as a member of Los Super Seven, a supergroup that also included Mexican-American country singers Rick Trevino and Freddy Fender. Meanwhile, Reynolds recorded one album with the supergroup Swag, which also included members of Cheap Trick, Wilco, and Sixpence None the Richer. In 2000, McFadden joined Trent Summar & the New Row Mob.

The Mavericks reunited in 2003, with Eddie Perez as their fourth guitarist. Malo had known Perez because the two had played in an Austin, Texas nightclub before the Mavericks' foundation. The re-established band recorded two albums for the British Sanctuary Records: the self-titled The Mavericks and a live album recorded in Austin, Texas, which was accompanied by a DVD release. Malo said that many of the songs on the self-titled album were inspired by his concerns over the sociopolitical scene of the United States following the September 11 attacks, and that Sanctuary Records executives were more willing to let the band record their music without executive interference. Only one single from The Mavericks charted: a cover of The Hollies' "The Air That I Breathe". Also included on the album was a collaboration with Willie Nelson on "Time Goes By". Jeffrey B. Remz of Country Standard Time reviewed the album favorably, finding influences of The Beatles and Roy Orbison in the songwriting and arrangements. Despite touring in 2003 and 2004 to support these projects, they were commercially unsuccessful, and the band broke up a second time. Malo continued to record as a solo artist after this second disbanding; he also produced Rick Trevino's 2003 album In My Dreams and wrote several of its songs with Hanna. After this, Hanna recorded one album in 2005 as half of the duo Hanna-McEuen, while Perez briefly toured as Dwight Yoakam's guitarist. After Hanna-McEuen disbanded, Jaime Hanna served as a touring guitarist for Gary Allan before joining his father as a member of Nitty Gritty Dirt Band in 2018.

=== 2011–2015: Second reunion and Valory Music ===
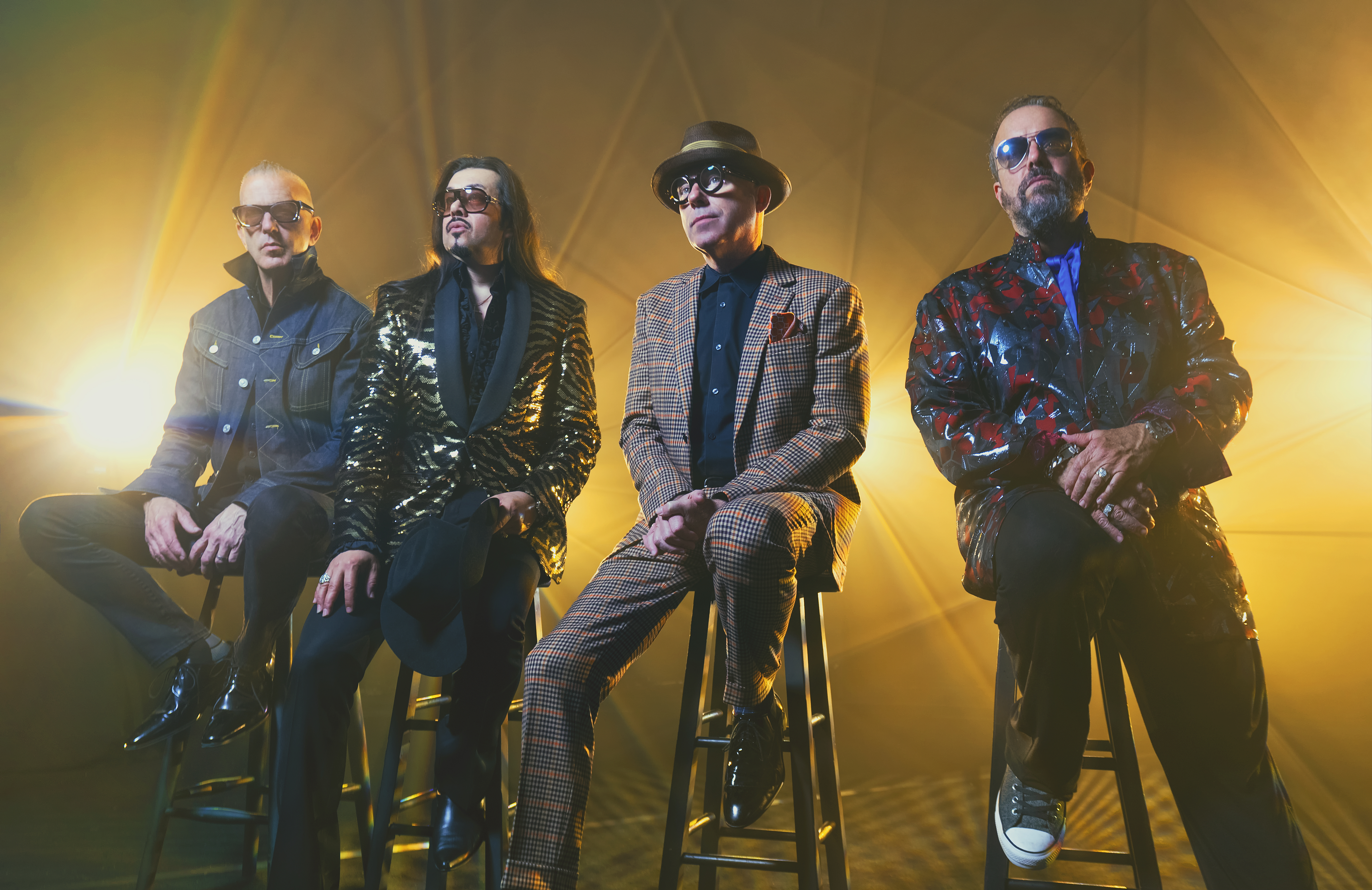
The Mavericks in 2020.

In October 2011, Malo, Deakin, Reynolds, and Perez reunited as The Mavericks for a second time. McFadden officially became a fifth member at this point, still accompanying on keyboards. Following this, they announced plans to reunite for a tour in 2012. Included in the tour was the Stagecoach Festival in Indio, California, followed by various stops in North America and Europe. Coinciding with this reunion, the group signed with Valory Music Co., an imprint of Big Machine Records, in February 2012. They released a digital extended play titled Suited Up and Ready and charted in early 2012 with its lead single "Born to Be Blue". Their first full-length album for Valory In Time was released on February 26, 2013. On this project, Malo co-produced with Niko Bolas and wrote or co-wrote every song. Writing for AllMusic, Steve Leggett stated that it was "a further step away from anything resembling a mainstream country release, incorporating not only the Tex-Mex and Cuban influences the band was known for, but also the rhythms of polkas, tangos, and all manner of approaches". He thought that these additional influences made the album an "extension" of their previous efforts. Following this album, the band announced in early 2014 that they would honor their 25th anniversary with a tour throughout the United States and Canada, starting in Charleston, South Carolina.

For live shows, Reynolds moved from playing bass guitar to acoustic guitar (which was low enough in the sound mix to be described as "inaudible" by some concert-goers); Ed Friedland was hired as the group's touring bassist. This was due to Reynolds having developed an addiction to opiates that was affecting his playing. Also joining The Mavericks' touring band at this point were Max Abrams (saxophone, percussion), Matt Cappy (trumpet), and Michael Guerra (accordion). Reynolds was fired from the band in October 2014 after the other members learned that he was soliciting money from fans under false pretenses in order to support his addiction. The band did not publicize Reynolds's departure, or the reasons behind it, until December. Reynolds was not replaced by a permanent band member; Ed Friedland continued as a touring bassist and session player on Mavericks recordings until 2023.

The Mavericks released their second Valory album Mono on February 7, 2015. The album was so named because it was mixed in monaural sound. As with the previous album, Malo wrote most of the songs, except for a cover of Doug Sahm's "Nitty Gritty". Country Standard Time reviewer Andy Turner stated that the album "is quite festive and certainly sounds like a band happy to be back and having a fun time." A year later, this album was nominated at the 58th Annual Grammy Awards for Grammy Award for Best Americana Album.

=== 2016–present: Mono Mundo and death of Raul Malo ===
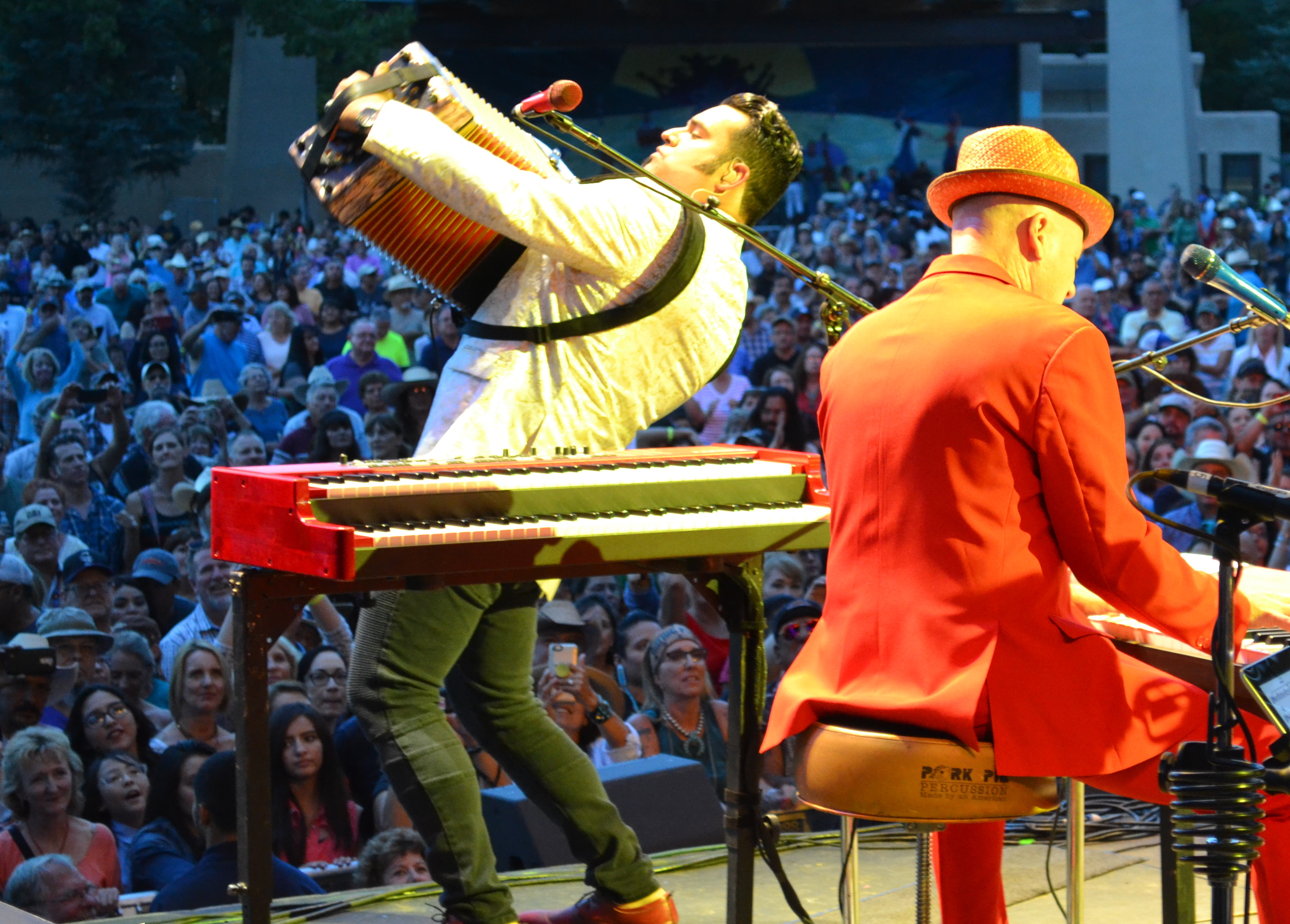
Accordionist Michael Guerra (left) and keyboardist Jerry Dale McFadden (right) in 2017

After being released from Valory in 2016, the band founded their own label Mono Mundo in association with Thirty Tigers. Their first release on their own label was a live album titled All Night Live, Volume 1. This was followed by their next studio release, Brand New Day, in March 2017. This, too, was nominated for Grammy Award for Best Americana Album the following year. Deming contrasted the album favorably to Trampoline, noting that the band continued to include Latin, Tejano, and "vintage pop". This was followed in 2018 by their first Christmas album, Hey! Merry Christmas! A thirtieth-anniversary tour followed in 2019, focusing mainly on the United Kingdom, Canada, and the Netherlands while also including select locations in the United States. By this point, both Lorenzo Molina and Julio Diaz replaced Matt Cappy on trumpets. Coinciding with this tour, the band released their next album, Play the Hits, the same year. This album consisted entirely of cover songs, including Bruce Springsteen's "Hungry Heart", Elvis Presley's "Don't Be Cruel", Willie Nelson's "Blue Eyes Crying in the Rain", and Freddy Fender's "Before the Next Teardrop Falls" among others. Deming said of this album that "Even when the Mavericks don't necessarily make the songs their own, they know how to perform them with a conviction that elevates them from the work of another cover outfit".

On August 21, 2020, the band released En Español, their first album entirely in the Spanish language. Deming stated in AllMusic that, while the album contained fewer country and pop influences than its predecessors, it also emphasized the band's Latin music roots more fully than previous projects. He concluded his review by stating that it was "adventurous and crafted with heart and skill, and that's what they've always done best." Friedland left their touring band in 2023, at which point Malo briefly took over on bass in addition to his role as lead singer. The band announced their next album, Moon & Stars, would be released in May 2024. The announcement confirmed that the project would include a collaboration with Maggie Rose as well as a song co-written by Bernie Taupin. Before its release, the band went on a tour of Europe.

On June 27, 2024, Malo announced via social media that he had been diagnosed with intestinal cancer. Because of treatments, the band had to cancel several shows throughout the latter half of 2024. Also by this point, Malo reverted to guitarist when Scotty Huff joined their touring band as bassist. In August 2025, Malo reported that his cancer had worsened, leading the band to cancel all concerts for the rest of the year. At the time of this announcement, Malo revealed that in addition to intestinal cancer, he had also developed leptomeningeal cancer.

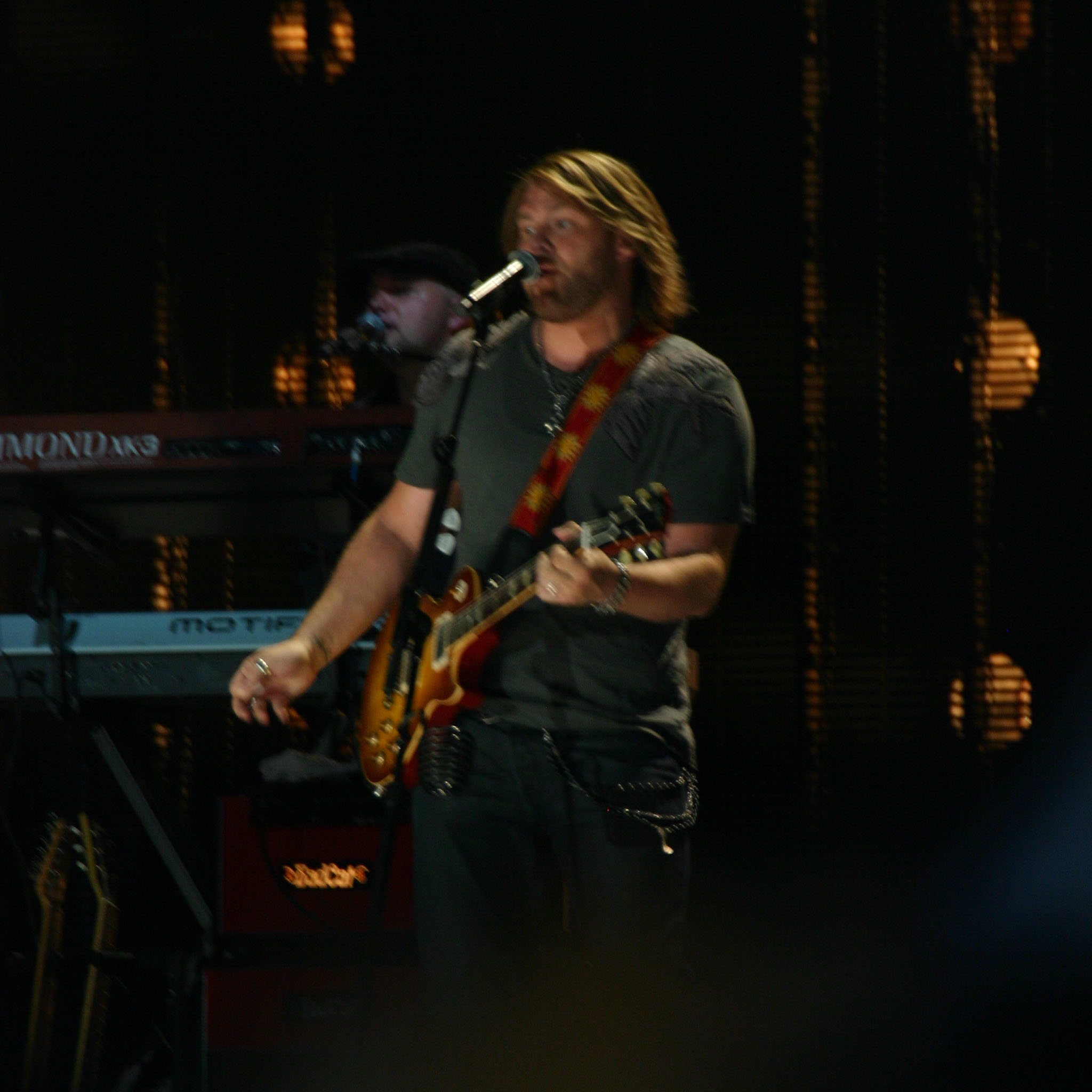
James Otto (pictured in 2008) is a featured vocalist on the Mavericks' 2026 Music Lives On tour.

A number of acts gathered at the Ryman Auditorium in Nashville in December 2025 to host a two-day tribute concert to the Mavericks, known as Dance the Night Away: A 35 Year Musical Legacy Celebration Honoring Raul Malo. Artists in attendance included James Otto, Steve Earle, Maggie Rose, Jamey Johnson, Mandy Barnett, Emily West, and Marty Stuart. Malo himself intended to attend the concerts with his family, but was hospitalized the day before the first show. Malo died on December 8, aged 60.

The remaining members of the Mavericks announced that they would begin a new tour in May 2026 known as the Music Lives On Tour, with Otto and West alternating as vocalists. These tours also reinstated Reynolds as a touring musician. In November 2026, Malo's widow, Betty, filed a lawsuit against Deakin, McFadden, and Perez, for use of the Mavericks name. Her lawsuit claimed that the band could not continue to tour or record under the Mavericks name without Malo's involvement.

== Musical styles ==
At the time of their signing with MCA, The Mavericks were seen as unusual in country music due not only to Malo's Cuban-American ancestry, but also to the band's origins in Miami, Florida. This was because at the time, the Miami music scene was better known for hip hop and dance music than for country. Many reviewers have considered Malo's role as lead singer and songwriter an integral part of the band's sound. In a review of From Hell to Paradise, Alanna Nash described Malo's singing voice as "a tight, pinched vibrato that carries all the tension of a high-voltage wire". Writing for AllMusic, John D. Buchanan described What a Crying Shame as "a grand showcase for the rich, emotive vocals of Raul Malo and the band's eclectic but accessible approach." In a review of Trampoline for the same site, Thom Owens stated that Malo's voice was the defining characteristic of the band's sound; he wrote that, through his singing and production, Malo was the "driving force behind all of the group's stylistic fusions, their blend of honky tonk with country-rock, classic rock & roll, pop, and Latin." Of the songwriting, Owens continued that Malo was "among the most imaginative roots songwriting of the '90s." Tony Brown, a record producer who was also the head of artists and repertoire (A&R) of MCA Nashville at the time of the band's signing, described Malo as "bigger than life" in a way that he compared to Alabama lead singer Randy Owen; Brown also thought that having a "great frontman" was key to a country music band's success.

Music critics have defined the band's musical styles with a wide variety of influences. Brown thought that the success of new bands in the 1990s such as Diamond Rio, combined with the commercial appeal of more rock-influenced country bands such as The Kentucky Headhunters, would lead to The Mavericks' success. Nash wrote that they "constitute country’s coolest ensemble, synthesizing ’50s country and ’60s pop and rock with intelligence, verve, and cultural variety." John D. Buchanan of AllMusic said of the band that "Fusing traditional country with a rich variety of rock, pop, and Latin influences, the Mavericks became one of the most critically acclaimed and commercially successful groups of the early '90s." Rick Bell of the North County Times, in a review of Trampoline, noted that the band's use of horn sections and string sections on the album gave it a "fuller sound" that complemented Malo's "velvety baritone". Mark Deming highlighted Nick Kane's "fine hipster jazz picking" in a review of Music for All Occasions. He also found influences of two-step in the album's "The Writing on the Wall" and Tejano music through the use of accordion on "All You Ever Do Is Bring Me Down", while Joel Bernstein of Country Standard Time compared the latter to Cajun music for the same reason. He also described the band's cover of "Blue Moon" as "Roy Orbison meets Dean Martin". Deming stated in a review of What a Crying Shame that "Robert Reynolds and Paul Deakin are a rhythm section who can give these songs the nervy drive of a rock band without betraying the Mavericks' country leanings, and they give the covers of 'All That Heaven Will Allow' and 'O What a Thrill' a taut foundation most contemporary Nashville acts lack."

== Members ==
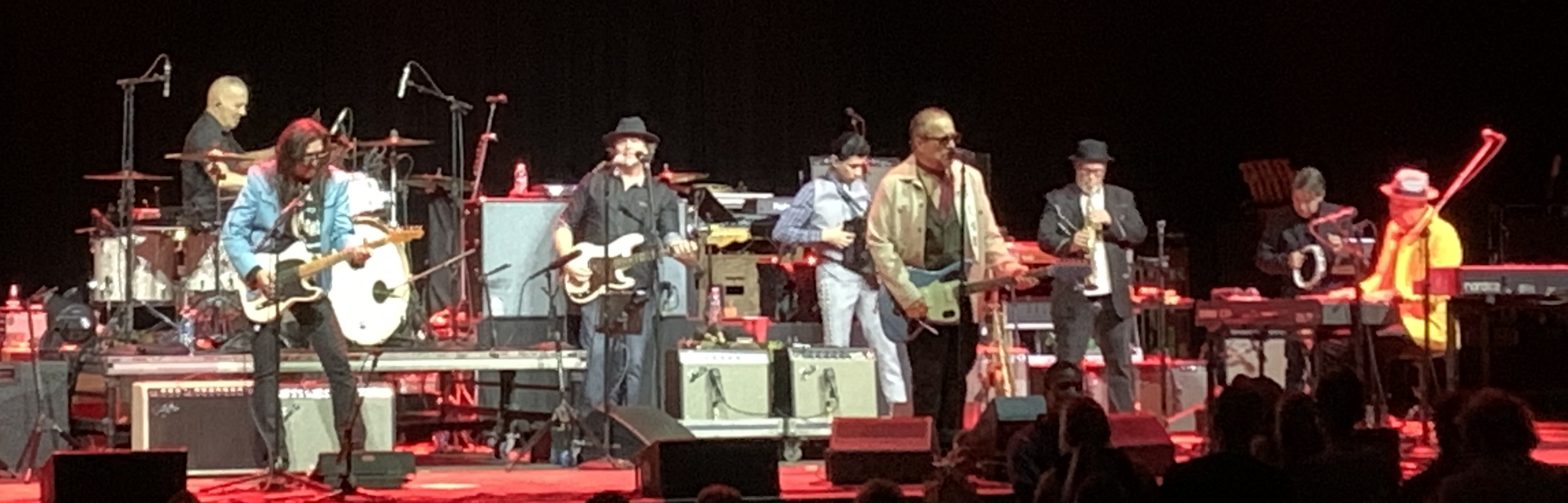
The Mavericks and their touring band in 2024 (from left to right: Paul Deakin, Eddie Perez, Scotty Huff, Percy Cardona, Raul Malo, Max Abrams, Julio Diaz, and Jerry Dale McFadden)

Current members

- Paul Deakin – drums (1989–2000, 2003–2004, 2012–present)
- Eddie Perez – guitar, vocals (2003–2004, 2012–present)
- Jerry Dale McFadden – keyboards, vocals (2012–present; touring 1994–2000, 2003–2004)

Past members

- Raul Malo – vocals, guitar (1989–2000, 2003–2004, 2012–2025; his death); bass (2023–2024)
- Robert Reynolds – bass, vocals (1989–2000, 2003–2004, 2012–2014); acoustic rhythm guitar (2014)
- Ben Peeler – guitar (1989–1991)
- David Lee Holt – guitar (1991–1993)
- Nick Kane – guitar (1993–2000)

Touring members

- Max Abrams – saxophone (2014–present)
- Julio Diaz – trumpet, percussion (2019–present)
- Percy Cardona – accordion (2021–present)
- Scotty Huff – bass (2024–present)
- James Otto - vocals (2026–present)
- Emily West - vocals (2026–present)

Former touring members

- Jaime Hanna – guitar
- Matt Cappy – trumpet (2014–2019)
- Ed Friedland – bass guitar, upright bass (2014–2023)
- Michael Guerra – accordion (2012–2021)
- Lorenzo Molina – trumpet

== Awards ==
List of awards and nominations received by The Mavericks, sorted by year

Year	Association	Category	Nominated work	Result
1994	Academy of Country Music	Top Vocal Group	—N/a	Won
1994	Academy of Country Music	Top New Vocal Duet or Group	—N/a	Won
1995	Grammy Awards	Best Country Performance by a Duo or Group with Vocal	"What a Crying Shame"	Nominated
1995	Country Music Association	Vocal Group of the Year	—N/a	Won
1995	Academy of Country Music	Top Vocal Group	—N/a	Won
1996	Grammy Awards	Best Country Performance by a Duo or Group with Vocal	"Here Comes the Rain"	Won
1996	Country Music Association	Vocal Group of the Year	—N/a	Won
1996	Grammy Awards	Best Country Album	Music for All Occasions	Nominated
1996	Academy of Country Music	Top Vocal Group	—N/a	Nominated
1997	Grammy Awards	Best Country Performance by a Duo or Group with Vocal	"All You Ever Do Is Bring Me Down"	Nominated
1997	Country Music Association	Vocal Group of the Year	—N/a	Nominated
1998	Grammy Awards	Best Country Performance by a Duo or Group with Vocal	"I Don't Care (If You Love Me Anymore)"	Nominated
1998	Country Music Association	Vocal Group of the Year	—N/a	Nominated
1999	Grammy Awards	Best Country Performance by a Duo or Group with Vocal	"Dance the Night Away"	Nominated
2015	Grammy Awards	Best Americana Album	Mono	Nominated
2017	Grammy Awards	Best Americana Album	Brand New Day	Nominated
2021	Americana Music Honors & Awards	Trailblazer Award	—N/a	Won

== Discography ==
Studio albums

- The Mavericks (1990)
- From Hell to Paradise (1992)
- What a Crying Shame (1994)
- Music for All Occasions (1995)
- Trampoline (1998)
- The Mavericks (2003)
- In Time (2013)
- Mono (2015)
- Brand New Day (2017)
- Hey! Merry Christmas! (2018)
- Play the Hits (2019)
- En Español (2020)
- Moon & Stars (2024)
