= From Hell to Paradise =

Studio album by The Mavericks
- Released: May 12, 1992
- Recorded: October 1991–February 1992
- Studio: Criteria, Miami, Florida, Javalina, and Masterfonics, Nashville, TN
- Genre: Americana; neotraditional country
- Length: 36:13
- Label: MCA Nashville
- Producer: Richard Bennett; Steve Fishell; Raul Malo

The Mavericks chronology
| The Mavericks (1990) | From Hell to Paradise (1992) | What a Crying Shame (1994) |

From Hell to Paradise is the second album by the American country music band the Mavericks. It was released in May 1992 on MCA Nashville Records. The only album to feature David Lee Holt on lead guitar, it comprises ten songs, including re-recordings of four from their first album, The Mavericks (1990): "Mr. Jones", "The End of the Line (Jim Baker)", "This Broken Heart" and "A Better Way".

Two cover songs appear on the album: "Excuse Me (I Think I've Got a Heartache)" and "Hey Good Lookin'", which were previously recorded by Buck Owens and Hank Williams, respectively. The latter cover was one of two singles released, and it peaked at No. 74 on the Billboard country charts in 1992. The other, "I Got You" b/w "A Better Way", failed to chart.

== Critical reception ==
Professional ratings
Review scores
| Source | Rating |
|---|---|
| AllMusic | 4/5 stars |

The Austin American-Statesman wrote that Raul Malo "sings like the reincarnation of Del Shannon, and the Texas twang of guitarist David Holt ... helps offset the production's tendency toward slickness."

== Track listing ==
All songs written by Raul Malo except where noted.

1. "Mr. Jones" – 3:24
2. "The End of the Line" – 3:33
3. "Excuse Me (I Think I've Got a Heartache)" (Buck Owens, Harlan Howard) – 2:38
4. "This Broken Heart" – 3:45
5. "I Got You" (Malo, Radney Foster) – 3:11
6. "From Hell to Paradise" – 4:46
7. "A Better Way" – 3:49
8. "Forever Blue" – 3:26
9. "Hey Good Lookin'" (Hank Williams) – 2:37
10. "Children" – 5:04

== Personnel ==
The Mavericks

- Paul Deakin- drums, vibraphone
- David Lee Holt- electric guitar
- Raul Malo- bass guitar, 12-string guitar, acoustic guitar, electric guitar, lead vocals, background vocals
- Robert Reynolds- bass guitar, background vocals

Additional musicians

- The Arvida Middle School Choir- background vocals
- Eddie Bayers- drums
- Richard Bennett- acoustic guitar, electric guitar, requinto, tiple
- Steve Fishell- dobro, steel guitar
- David Hungate- bass guitar
- John Barlow Jarvis- piano, organ
- John Leventhal- bass guitar, organ
- Debbie Spring- fiddle, viola
- Harry Stinson- background vocals
- Marty Stuart- electric guitar, mandolin
- Cindy Richardson-Walker- background vocals
- Dennis Walker- background vocals
- Pete Wasner- piano
- Roger White- organ
- Homer Willis- harmonica
- Dennis Wilson- background vocals
