= There Goes My Heart (The Mavericks song) =

Single by The Mavericks

from the album What a Crying Shame
- B-side: "Just a Memory"
- Released: October 1, 1994
- Genre: Neotraditional country
- Length: 3:20
- Label: MCA
- Songwriters: Raul Malo, Kostas
- Producer: Don Cook

The Mavericks singles chronology
"O What a Thrill" (1994)	"There Goes My Heart" (1994)	"I Should Have Been True" (1995)

"There Goes My Heart" is a song written by Raul Malo and Kostas, and recorded by American country music group The Mavericks. It was released in October 1994 as the third single from the album What a Crying Shame. The song reached number 20 on the Billboard Hot Country Singles & Tracks chart.

== Music video ==
The music video was directed by Michael McNamara, and premiered in late 1994.

== Chart performance ==
Chart (1994)	Peak position
Canada Country Singles (RPM)	14
US Hot Country Songs (Billboard)	20
