= Mono (The Mavericks album) =

Studio album by the Mavericks
- Released: February 17, 2015
- Recorded: July–November 2014
- Length: 42:54
- Label: Valory
- Producer: Niko Bolas; Raul Malo

The Mavericks chronology
In Time (2013)	Mono (2015)	Brand New Day (2017)

Professional ratings
Review scores
Source	Rating
AllMusic	4/5 stars

Mono is the eighth studio album by American country music band the Mavericks. It was released on February 17, 2015, via Valory Music Group. The album sold 8,000 copies in its first week of release, debuting at number 5 on the Billboard Top Country Albums chart.

True to its title, the album is mixed in monaural (mono) sound. For the record's tenth anniversary, a limited edition stereo mix was released, titled Mono in Stereo.

== Track listing ==
No.	Title	Writer(s)	Length
1.	"All Night Long"	Raul Malo	3:57
2.	"Summertime (When I'm with You)"	Malo	3:00
3.	"Pardon Me"	Malo, Alan Miller	3:45
4.	"What Am I Supposed to Do"	Malo	3:02
5.	"Stories We Could Tell"	Malo, Wally Wilson	3:56
6.	"What You Do to Me"	Malo, Miller	3:20
7.	"Let It Rain (On Me)"	Malo	3:00
8.	"The Only Question Is"	Malo	4:10
9.	"Out the Door"	Malo	3:31
10.	"(Waiting For) The World to End"	Malo, Miller	4:23
11.	"Fascinate Me"	Malo, Jerry Dale McFadden	3:44
12.	"Nitty Gritty"	Doug Sahm	3:06
Total length:			42:54

== Chart performance ==
Chart (2015)	Peak position
US Billboard 200	57
US Top Country Albums (Billboard)	5
