= Dance the Night Away (The Mavericks song) =

1998 single by the Mavericks

Single by the Mavericks

from the album Trampoline
- B-side: "Save a Prayer"; "All I Get"; "Pantella"
- Released: March 10, 1998
- Studio: Ocean Way, Nashville
- Genre: Pop rock; Latin
- Length: 4:22
- Label: MCA Nashville (US); MCA (Europe)
- Songwriter: Raul Malo
- Producers: Don Cook; Raul Malo

The Mavericks singles chronology
"To Be with You" (1998)	"Dance the Night Away" (1998)	"I've Got This Feeling" (1999)

Music video
- "Dance the Night Away" on YouTube

"Dance the Night Away" is a song by American country band the Mavericks, written by the band's lead vocalist, Raul Malo, and produced by Malo alongside Don Cook. It was included on their fifth studio album, Trampoline (1998), as the opening track. Primarily a pop-rock and Latin song backed up by horn instruments, it was written in one afternoon by Malo, who began to arrange music more often after completing the demo recording.

The song was released as a single in the United States on March 10, 1998, reaching number 63 on the Billboard Hot Country Singles & Tracks chart. The Mavericks also convinced their record label, MCA Records, to issue the song in Europe; this was done on April 20 of the same year. Following its European release, the single peaked at number nine on the Irish Singles Chart and number four on the UK Singles Chart. It continues to be one of the band's most enduring hits.

== Background ==
In an interview with Songwriting, a British online magazine, Mavericks lead singer Raul Malo revealed that "Dance the Night Away" was a "happy accident". He first played the chords of E, B, and B7 on his guitar, and over the course of the afternoon, he continued to build up the song and finish the writing. After he recorded the demo track, he realized that all the parts of the song were already present, so the rest of the Mavericks copied the demo track. Malo went on to say that the demo recording gave him the confidence to arrange music. When he presented the song to his record label, MCA Records, they responded positively but were irresolute about what to do with it. The band suggested releasing the song in the United Kingdom and Europe, which they eventually accomplished. The band promoted the song in the UK by performing it on the National Lottery show, which subsequently led to its chart debut.

== Composition ==
"Dance the Night Away" has been described as a pop rock song by Jan Hansen of Radio Mojn in Denmark, saying that the track is not a genuine country music song. He explained, "It's more like rock-pop ... with a lot of instruments in it, which makes the song much happier." It is also a Latin-influenced song. The track is set in common time and has a tempo of 138 beats per minute, with a key of E major. It contains several horn instrument segments played in the same key.

== Commercial performance ==
In North America, "Dance the Night Away" became a minor hit on the American and Canadian country charts. In the US, it peaked at number 63 on the Billboard Hot Country Singles & Tracks chart, while it Canada, it reached number 72 on the RPM Country 100. In March 1998, the song picked up airplay in the Netherlands, attaining peaks of number 23 on the Dutch Top 40 and number 25 on the Single Top 100.

Following its official European release in April, the song charted in Ireland and the United Kingdom. It the latter country, the single debuted at number nine on the UK Singles Chart, spent three weeks rising and falling in the top 10, then peaked at number four on May 24, 1998. It went on to spend a further 13 weeks in the top 100, and at the end of the year, it was ranked as the UK's 26th-highest-selling hit. The British Phonographic Industry (BPI) awarded the record a platinum certification in April 2020 for sales and streaming figures of over 600,000. In Ireland, it debuted on the Irish Singles Chart on April 30 and reached number nine. It also charted in Germany, where it rose to number 66 for two weeks in late July 1998.

"Dance the Night Away" is the Mavericks' most popular song. During his interview with Songwriter, Malo said that he was shocked by the song's success, but he also felt that it was not the band's best work. He claimed that although he did not despise the song, he felt its success prevented people from investigating the band and their music much further. However, he ultimately decided that he was content with the "beautiful" results of the song's fame.

== Music video ==
The music video was directed by Gerry Wenner and is set in a typical supermarket. Once the song starts, activity in the market increases as the Mavericks perform "Dance the Night Away" in various locations around the store. A security guard, seeing the band on surveillance cameras, searches the market for them. At the video's finale, the guard gives up as the music ends with the band looking into the security cameras. British television program Top of the Pops 2 debuted the video on February 28, 1998; afterwards, it was added to 20 video playlists, including those of VH1 and Radio 2.

== Track listings ==
US 7-inch single

A. "Dance the Night Away" – 4:08
B. "Save a Prayer" – 5:06

UK CD single

1. "Dance the Night Away" – 4:22
2. "All I Get" – 4:09
3. "Pantella" – 2:41
4. "Dance the Night Away" (video)

European CD single

1. "Dance the Night Away" – 4:22
2. "All I Get" – 4:09

European and Australian maxi-CD single

1. "Dance the Night Away" – 4:22
2. "All I Get" – 4:09
3. "Pantella" – 2:41

== Credits and personnel ==
Credits are lifted from the UK enhanced CD single liner notes.

Studios

- Recorded at Ocean Way Nashville (Nashville, Tennessee)
- Mastered at MasterMix (Nashville, Tennessee)

Personnel

- Raul Malo – writing, production
- Don Cook – production
- Hank Williams – mastering

== Charts ==
=== Weekly charts ===
Chart (1998)	Peak position
Canada Country Singles (RPM)	72
Europe (Eurochart Hot 100)	18
Germany (GfK)	66
Ireland (IRMA)	9
Netherlands (Dutch Top 40)	23
Netherlands (Single Top 100)	25
Scottish Singles Sales (Official Charts)	5
UK Singles (Official Charts)	4
US Hot Country Songs (Billboard)	63

=== Year-end charts ===
Chart (1998)	Position
UK Singles (OCC)	26

== Certifications ==
Region	Certification	Certified units/sales
United Kingdom (BPI)	Platinum	600,000^{‡}
^{‡} Sales+streaming figures based on certification alone.

== Release history ==
Region	Date	Format(s)	Label(s)	Ref(s).
United States	March 10, 1998	7-inch vinyl	MCA Nashville	
Europe	April 20, 1998	CD; cassette	MCA	
United States	August 25, 1998	Contemporary hit radio	MCA Nashville	
