= Hanna–McEuen =

- Origin: Nashville, Tennessee, United States
- Genres: Country
- Years active: 2005-2007
- Labels: DreamWorks Nashville; MCA Nashville
- Past members: Jaime Hanna; Jonathan McEuen

Hanna–McEuen was an American country music duo consisting of first cousins Jaime Hanna and Jonathan McEuen, both vocalists and guitarists. Their fathers, Jeff Hanna and John McEuen, co-founded the Nitty Gritty Dirt Band. In addition, Hanna was formerly an occasional supporting musician for the Mavericks.

Hanna–McEuen released its self-titled debut album on DreamWorks Records in 2005, although the album's singles were distributed and promoted by MCA Nashville. The album produced a Top 40 hit on the Billboard Hot Country Songs charts in "Something Like a Broken Heart", followed by "Tell Me" at number 56 and "Ocean", which did not chart.

The duo also recorded a DVD-Audio/Video project titled "Tried and True" in 2007 for AIX Records, which featured a guest appearance by country guitarist Albert Lee.

After disbanding, Hanna joined Gary Allan's road band, in which he plays guitar. He also co-wrote Allan's 2008 single "She's So California". McEuen, meanwhile, has continued to record as a solo artist. Jaime Hanna joined the Nitty Gritty Dirt Band in 2018.

== Discography ==
=== Albums ===
Title	Details	Peak positions
Title	Details	US Country
Hanna–McEuen	Release date: August 16, 2005; Label: DreamWorks Nashville; Formats: CD, music download	42

=== Singles ===
Year	Single	Peak positions	Album
Year	Single	US Country	Album
2005	"Something Like a Broken Heart"	38	Hanna–McEuen
2005	"Ocean"	—	Hanna–McEuen
2005	"Tell Me"	56	Hanna–McEuen
"—" denotes releases that did not chart

=== Music videos ===
Year	Video	Director
2005	"Something Like a Broken Heart"	Trey Fanjoy
2005	"Ocean"	The Malloys
