= Raul Malo =

American singer-songwriter (1965–2025)

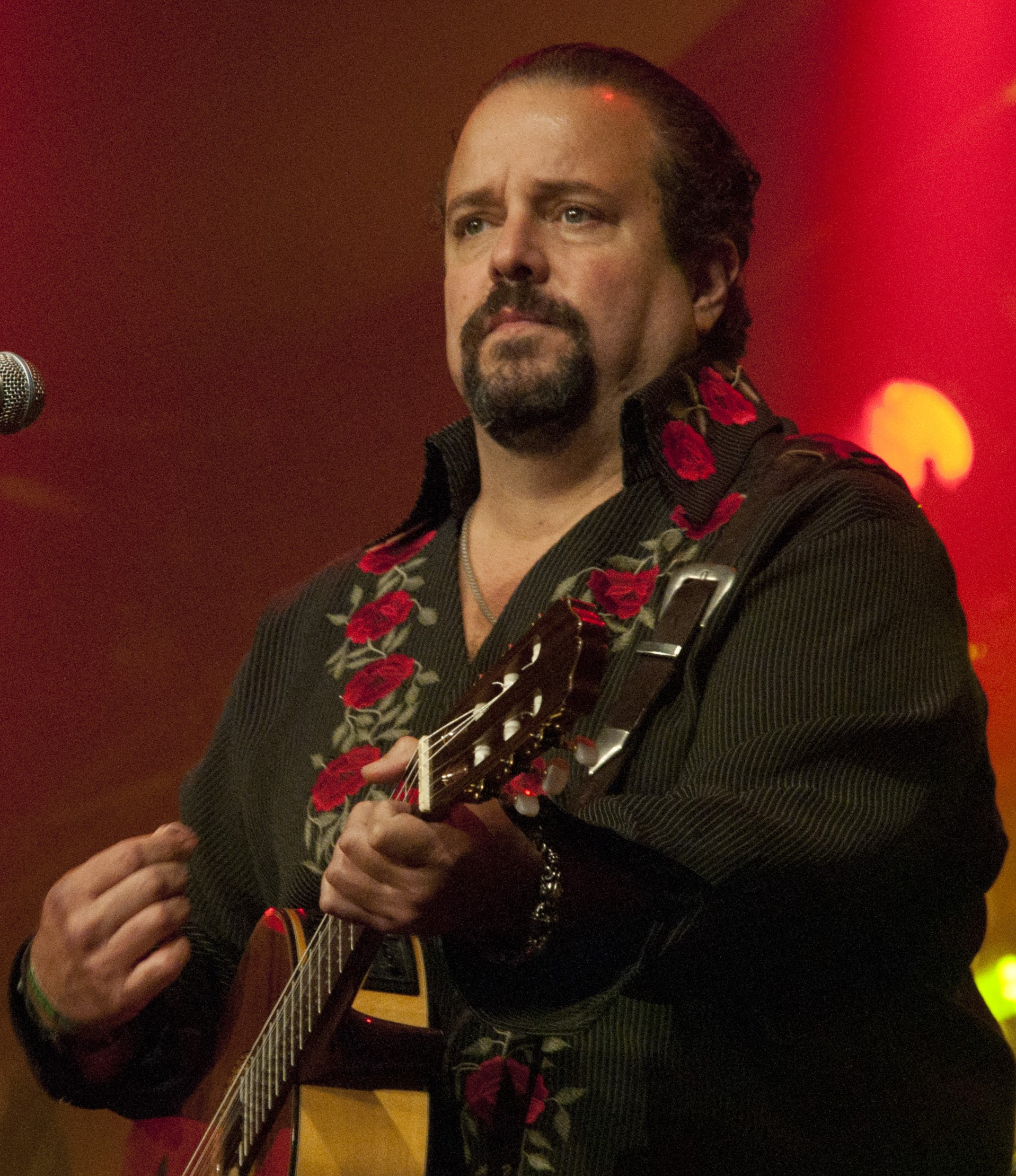
- Malo performing in 2011

Background information
- Born: Raul Francisco Martínez-Malo Jr. August 7, 1965; Miami, Florida, U.S.
- Died: December 8, 2025 (aged 60) Nashville, Tennessee, U.S.
- Genres: Americana; neotraditional country; western swing; country rock; Tex‑Mex; progressive country
- Occupation: Singer-songwriter
- Instruments: Vocals; guitar
- Years active: 1989–2025
- Label: New Door
- Formerly of: The Mavericks

Raul Francisco Martínez-Malo Jr. (August 7, 1965 – December 8, 2025) was an American singer, songwriter, guitarist and record producer. He was both the lead singer and songwriter of country music band the Mavericks, co-writing many of their singles, as well as Rick Trevino's 2003 single "In My Dreams". After the disbanding of the Mavericks in the early 2000s, Malo pursued a solo career. He also participated from 2001 in the Los Super Seven supergroup. The Mavericks re-formed in 2012 and continued to tour extensively. In 2015, they won the Americana music award for duo/group of the year.

== Life and career ==
Malo was born in Miami to Cuban immigrant parents Raul Martinez Malo Sr. and Norma Martinez. However, for much of his adult life, Malo was based in Nashville, Tennessee, where he had lived since 1993. Malo was of maternal Spanish descent, as his grandfather had been a Spanish migrant to Cuba some time prior to the family’s move to Florida. He was personally fond of the music of performers such as Elvis Presley and Hank Williams.

== Vocalist for The Mavericks ==
Malo was the lead vocalist for The Mavericks founded in Miami in 1989. The Mavericks have charted 15 times on the American Billboard Hot Country Songs charts; their highest-peaking single there is "All You Ever Do Is Bring Me Down", a collaboration with accordionist Flaco Jiménez which reached number 13 in 1996. Three of their singles made top 10 on the country music charts of the defunct RPM magazine in Canada, and "Dance the Night Away" was a hit single in the United Kingdom in 1998. Their most commercially successful album What a Crying Shame has been certified platinum in the United States and double-platinum in Canada.

== Personal life ==
For 34 years, Malo was married to Betty, and had three sons.

In June 2024, Malo announced that he had been diagnosed with cancer.

In September 2025, he canceled his remaining tour dates due to his cancer, which Malo said on his Instagram page had by this point reached its leptomeningeal disease (LMD) stage, thus spreading to his spinal cord and brain. During his bout with cancer, Malo also left his Nashville home and stayed in Houston, where he received treatment at MD Anderson. On December 7, 2025, however, Betty Malo confirmed on her Instagram page that she and Raul by now received mail from a UPS business center in Nashville.

On December 4, 2025, Malo was hospitalized, the day before the first of two nights of tribute shows, which he and his family were also initially scheduled to attend, were set to be held in his honor in Nashville. Despite his continued hospitalization, both tribute shows for Malo would be held as planned at Nashville's Ryman Auditorium on December 5 and 6, 2025. On December 6, his Mavericks bandmates were able to visit him in the hospital, giving him one final "concert," which his wife posted a clip of on her Instagram page. Malo died of colon cancer on December 8, at the age of 60. On January 23, 2026, he was awarded the American Eagle Award from the National Music Council.

== Solo discography ==
=== Albums ===
Title	Album details	Peak chart positions						
Title	Album details	US Country	US Heat	US Indie	US Holiday	UK	UK Country	NL
Today	Release date: October 23, 2001; Label: Higher Octave	—	—	—	—	80	1	75
You're Only Lonely	Release date: July 25, 2006; Label: Sanctuary Records	—	50	38	—	—	—	—
After Hours	Release date: July 17, 2007; Label: New Door Records	43	12	—	—	—	—	—
Marshmallow World & Other Holiday Favorites	Release date: September 25, 2007; Label: New Door Records	—	24	—	11	—	—	—
Lucky One	Release date: March 3, 2009; Label: Fantasy Records	—	13	—	—	—	3	—
Sinners and Saints	Release date: October 5, 2010; Label: Fantasy Records	—	7	—	—	—	—	—
Around the World Live	Release date: February 24, 2012; Label: Concord/Fantasy/Universal	—	—	—	—	—	1	—
Quarantunes	Release date: April 21, 2021; Label: Mono Mundo Recordings	—	—	—	—	—	—	—
Say Less	Release date: May 19, 2023; Label: Mono Mundo Recordings	—	—	—	—	—	13	—
"—" denotes releases that did not chart

=== Singles ===
Year	Single	Peak positions		Album
Year	Single	UK	NL	Album
2002	"I Said I Love You"	57	82	Today
2002	"Today"	148	—	Today
2006	"Feels Like Home"	—	—	You're Only Lonely
2009	"Lucky One"	—	—	Lucky One
2010	"Moonlight Kiss"	100	—	Lucky One
"—" denotes releases that did not chart

=== Music videos ===
Year	Video	Director
2009	"Hello Again"	Matt Robertson
