= Neal McCoy discography =

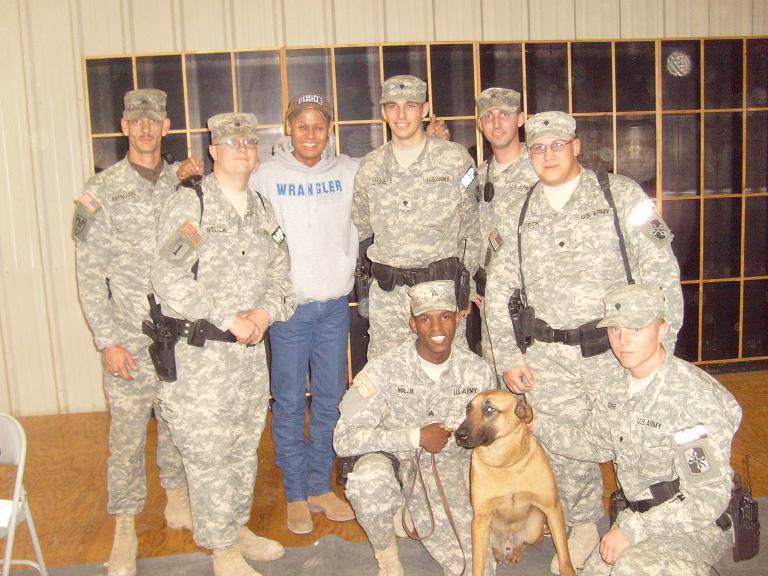
- Studio albums: 12
- Compilation albums: 2
- Singles: 39
- Music videos: 15
- #1 Singles: 2

The discography of Neal McCoy, an American country music singer, consists of 10 studio albums, two compilation albums and 39 singles. Two of his singles, "No Doubt About It" and "Wink" both reached number one on the Billboard country charts, and seven more reached top ten. His albums No Doubt About It and You Gotta Love That are both certified platinum by the Recording Industry Association of America (RIAA), and his 1996 self-titled album is certified gold.

== Studio albums ==
=== 1990s ===
Title	Album details	Peak chart positions				Certifications (sales thresholds)
Title	Album details	US Country	US	US Heat	CAN Country	Certifications (sales thresholds)
At This Moment	Release date: November 20, 1990; Label: Atlantic Records	—	—	—	—	
Where Forever Begins	Release date: June 2, 1992; Label: Atlantic Records	58	—	30	22	
No Doubt About It	Release date: February 8, 1994; Label: Atlantic Records	13	84	2	1	US: Platinum; CAN: Gold
You Gotta Love That!	Release date: January 24, 1995; Label: Atlantic Records	10	68	—	—	US: Platinum
Neal McCoy	Release date: June 4, 1996; Label: Atlantic Records	7	61	—	7	US: Gold
Be Good at It	Release date: October 28, 1997; Label: Atlantic Records	23	135	—	31	
The Life of the Party	Release date: January 19, 1999; Label: Atlantic Records	24	—	—	21	
"—" denotes releases that did not chart

=== 2000s ===
Title	Album details	Peak chart positions		
Title	Album details	US Country	US	US Indie
24-7-365	Release date: August 22, 2000; Label: Giant Records	28	—	—
That's Life	Release date: August 23, 2005; Label: 903 Music	8	32	3
"—" denotes releases that did not chart

=== 2010s ===
Title	Album details	Peak positions
Title	Album details	US Country
XII	Release date: March 6, 2012; Label: Blaster Records	58
Pride: A Tribute to Charley Pride	Release date: September 24, 2013; Label: Slate Creek Records	45
You Don't Know Me	Release date: August 5, 2016; Label: New Design Records	—

== Compilation albums ==
Title	Album details	Peak chart positions		Certifications (sales thresholds)
Title	Album details	US Country	US	Certifications (sales thresholds)
Greatest Hits	Release date: June 10, 1997; Label: Atlantic Records	5	55	US: Platinum
The Very Best of Neal McCoy	Release date: June 3, 2008; Label: Rhino Records	51	—	
Neal McCoy's Favorite Hits	Release date: March 7, 2017; Label: Nealbilly Music 903	—	—	
"—" denotes releases that did not chart

== Singles ==
=== 1980s and 1990s ===
Year	Single	Peak chart positions			Album
Year	Single	US Country	US	CAN Country	Album
1988	"That's How Much I Love You" (as Neal McGoy)	85	—	—	—N/a
1988	"That's American" (as Neal McGoy)	—	—	—	—N/a
1990	"If I Built You a Fire"	48	—	18	At This Moment
1991	"Hillbilly Blue"	—	—	—	At This Moment
1991	"This Time I've Hurt Her More (Than She Loves Me)"	50	—	—	At This Moment
1992	"Where Forever Begins"	40	—	37	Where Forever Begins
1992	"There Ain't Nothin' I Don't Like About You"	57	—	—	Where Forever Begins
1993	"Now I Pray for Rain"	26	—	35	Where Forever Begins
1993	"No Doubt About It"	1	75	1	No Doubt About It
1994	"Wink"	1	91	1	No Doubt About It
1994	"The City Put the Country Back in Me"	5	—	11	No Doubt About It
1994	"For a Change"	3	— (Note: "For a Change" did not enter the Hot 100, but peaked at number 8 on Bubbling Under Hot 100 Singles.)	8	You Gotta Love That!
1995	"They're Playin' Our Song"	3	—	8	You Gotta Love That!
1995	"If I Was a Drinkin' Man"	16	—	16	You Gotta Love That!
1996	"You Gotta Love That"	3	—	13	You Gotta Love That!
1996	"Then You Can Tell Me Goodbye"	4	— (Note: "Then You Can Tell Me Goodbye" did not enter the Hot 100, but peaked at number 7 on Bubbling Under Hot 100 Singles.)	7	Neal McCoy
1996	"Going, Going, Gone"	35	—	42	Neal McCoy
1996	"That Woman of Mine"	35	—	30	Neal McCoy
1997	"The Shake"	5	—	7	Greatest Hits
1997	"If You Can't Be Good (Be Good at It)"	22	—	15	Be Good at It
1998	"Party On"	50	—	86	Be Good at It
1998	"Love Happens Like That"	29	—	31	Be Good at It
1999	"I Was"	37	—	42	The Life of the Party
1999	"The Girls of Summer"	42	—	28	The Life of the Party
"—" denotes releases that did not chart

=== 2000s and 2010s ===
Year	Single	Peak chart positions		Album
Year	Single	US Country	US	Album
2000	"Forever Works for Me (Monday, Tuesday, Wednesday, Thursday)" (Note: "Forever Works for Me" was retitled "Forever Works for Me (Monday, Tuesday, Wednesday, Thursday)" partway through its chart run; it also peaked at number 71 on the RPM Country Tracks chart in Canada.)	38	—	24-7-365
2000	"Every Man for Himself"	37	—	24-7-365
2001	"Beatin' It In"	41	—	24-7-365
2002	"What If"	—	—	Inside Traxx 2002
2002	"The Luckiest Man in the World"	46	—	The Luckiest Man in the World (unreleased)
2005	"Billy's Got His Beer Goggles On"	10	75	That's Life
2006	"The Last of a Dying Breed"	35	—	That's Life
2006	"Tail on the Tailgate"	—	—	That's Life
2008	"Rednecktified"	—	—	The Very Best of Neal McCoy
2008	"For the Troops"	—	—	—N/a
2011	"New Mountain to Climb"	—	—	—N/a
2011	"A-OK"	52	—	XII
2012	"Shotgun Rider"	—	—	XII
2013	"Roll On Mississippi" (featuring Trace Adkins)	—	—	Pride: A Tribute to Charley Pride
2013	"Kaw-Liga"	—	—	Pride: A Tribute to Charley Pride
2014	"Can You Do This"	—	—	—N/a
2017	"Take a Knee, My Ass (I Won't Take a Knee)"	49	—	—N/a
"—" denotes releases that did not chart

== Other singles ==
=== Guest singles ===
Year	Single	Artist(s)	Peak chart positions		Album
Year	Single	Artist(s)	US Country	US	Album
1996	"Hope"	Various Artists	57	—	—N/a
1998	"One Heart at a Time"	Various Artists	69	56	—N/a
2000	"Now That's Awesome"	Bill Engvall (with Tracy Byrd and T. Graham Brown)	59	—	Now That's Awesome
"—" denotes releases that did not chart

=== Other charted songs ===
Year	Single	Peak positions	Album
Year	Single	US Country	Album
1996	"Hillbilly Rap"	71	Neal McCoy
2001	"I'll Be Home for Christmas/ Have Yourself a Merry Little Christmas"	74	Believe: A Christmas Collection

== Music videos ==
Year	Title	Director
1989	"That's American"	Steve Moss
1990	"If I Built You a Fire"	Mary Newman-Said
1991	"This Time I Hurt Her More (Than She Loves Me)"	Mary Newman-Said
1992	"Where Forever Begins"	
1994	"No Doubt About It"	Martin Kahan
1994	"Wink"	Martin Kahan
1994	"The City Put the Country Back in Me"	Martin Kahan
1995	"For a Change"	Marc Ball
1995	"They're Playing Our Song"	John Lloyd Miller
1995	"If I Was a Drinkin' Man"	John Lloyd Miller
1996	"Then You Can Tell Me Goodbye"	Martin Kahan
1996	"Hillbilly Rap"	
1996	"Going, Going, Gone"	Martin Kahan
1997	"The Shake"	chris rogers [sic]
1997	"If You Can't Be Good, Be Good At It"	chris rogers [sic]
1997	"Party On"	Jim Shea
1999	"I Was"	Marie Hack
2005	"Billy's Got His Beer Goggles On"	Buddy Swell
2006	"The Last of a Dying Breed"	Margaret Malandruccolo
2012	"A-OK"	Marcel
2013	"Kaw-Liga"	Jeff Venable
2014	"Can You Do This"	Cameron Childs

=== Guest appearances ===
Year	Title	Artist(s)	Director(s)
1996	"Hope"	Various	Frank W. Ockenfels III
1998	"One Heart at a Time"	Various	Ritch Sublett
2000	"Now That's Awesome"	Bill Engvall (with Tracy Byrd & T. Graham Brown)	Peter Zavadil
