= Greatest Hits (Neal McCoy album) =

Neal McCoy

Greatest hits album by Neal McCoy
- Released: June 10, 1997
- Genre: Country
- Length: 32:35
- Label: Atlantic
- Producer: "Now I Pray for Rain" produced by James Stroud "The Shake" produced by Kyle Lehning; All other tracks produced by Barry Beckett

Neal McCoy chronology
Neal McCoy (1996)	Neal McCoy (1997)	Be Good at It (1997)

Professional ratings
Review scores
Source	Rating
Allmusic	link
Country Standard Time	negative link

Greatest Hits is the first compilation album by American country music artist Neal McCoy, released in 1997 on Atlantic Records. The album comprises ten songs, nine of which were previously included on his second through fifth studio albums. "The Shake" was newly recorded for this compilation, and was later reprised on the following album, 1997's Be Good at It.

== Track listing ==
No.	Title	Writer(s)	Length
1.	"Now I Pray for Rain"	Lee Satterfield, George Teren	3:06
2.	"No Doubt About It"	John Scott Sherrill, Steve Seskin	3:47
3.	"Wink"	Bob DiPiero, Tom Shapiro	2:42
4.	"The City Put the Country Back in Me"	Mike Geiger, Woody Mullis, Michael Huffman	3:33
5.	"For a Change"	Sherrill, Seskin	3:22
6.	"They're Playin' Our Song"	John Jarrard, Mark D. Sanders, DiPiero	3:21
7.	"If I Was a Drinkin' Man"	J. B. Rudd, Byron Hill	3:18
8.	"You Gotta Love That"	Jess Brown, Brett Jones	2:36
9.	"Then You Can Tell Me Goodbye"	John D. Loudermilk	3:17
10.	"The Shake"	Jon McElroy, Butch Carr	3:33

== Charts ==
=== Weekly charts ===
Chart (1997)	Peak position
US Billboard 200	55
US Top Country Albums (Billboard)	5

=== Year-end charts ===
Chart (1997)	Position
US Billboard 200	181
US Top Country Albums (Billboard)	22
Chart (1998)	Position
US Top Country Albums (Billboard)	50

== Certifications ==
Region	Certification	Certified units/sales
United States (RIAA)	Platinum	1,000,000^{^}
^{^} Shipments figures based on certification alone.
