= The Luckiest Man in the World =

Studio album by Neal McCoy
- Released: Unreleased
- Genre: Country
- Label: Warner Bros. Nashville
- Producer: Eric Silver

Neal McCoy chronology
24-7-365 (2000)	The Luckiest Man in the World (Unreleased)	That's Life (2006)

The Luckiest Man in the World is an unreleased studio album recorded by American country music artist Neal McCoy. It was scheduled to be released in January 2003 on Warner Bros. Records, but was never released. The album's only single, which was the title track, peaked at #46 on the Billboard country charts in 2002. "Put Your Best Dress On" was later released by Steve Holy in 2004, whose version went to #26 on the same chart.

Although it was not released, Robert L. Doerschuk of Allmusic reviewed the album. He gave it four stars, saying that McCoy "fills this album with quality material and digs into it with some of his finest singing to date."

== Track listing ==
1. "Sing" (Brett James, Angelo Petraglia) – 3:55
2. "The Luckiest Man in the World" (Monty Powell, Eric Silver) – 3:48
3. "All at the Same Time" (Jim Collins, D. Vincent Williams) – 3:44
4. "Elvis at the Airport" (Leslie Satcher) – 2:50
5. "Put Your Best Dress On" (Billy Austin, Dillon Dixon, Don Pfrimmer, Williams) – 3:08
6. "Mine Is You" (James, Frank Rogers) – 3:22
7. "Never Got to Say" (Dean Blocker, Noah Gordon, Phil O'Donnell) – 3:47
8. "Honky Tonk Mona Lisa" (Marcus Hummon, Darrell Scott) – 3:13
9. "Too Far Gone" (Robert Ellis Orrall, John Bettis, Michael Post) – 3:35
10. "I'm Your Biggest Fan" (Anthony Smith, Bobby Terry, Chris Wallin) – 4:57

== Personnel ==
- David Angell - violin
- Jeff Bailey - trumpet
- Bob Britt - electric guitar
- John Catchings - cello
- Lisa Cochran - background vocals
- David Davidson - violin
- Scott Dixon - electric guitar
- Mark Douthit - saxophone
- Sonny Garrish - pedal steel guitar
- Mike Haynes - trumpet
- Wes Hightower - background vocals
- Mark Hill - bass guitar
- Wayne Killius - drums, percussion
- Troy Lancaster - electric guitar
- Tim Lauer - keyboards
- Lynn Massey - drums, background vocals
- Neal McCoy - lead vocals
- Chris McDonald - trombone
- Chris McHugh - drums, percussion
- Lorne O'Neil - bass guitar, background vocals
- Ryan Pierce - fiddle, background vocals
- Jeffrey Roach - organ, piano
- Louis Rodriguez - acoustic guitar
- Matt Rollings - organ, piano
- Leslie Satcher - background vocals
- Steve Segler - keyboards, background vocals
- Joey Shamp - background vocals
- Eric Silver - fiddle, acoustic guitar, mandocello, mandolin
- Jimmie Lee Sloas - bass guitar
- Keith Urban - electric guitar
- Kristin Wilkinson - viola
- Chris Willis - background vocals
