= List of Hot Country Singles & Tracks number ones of 1994 =

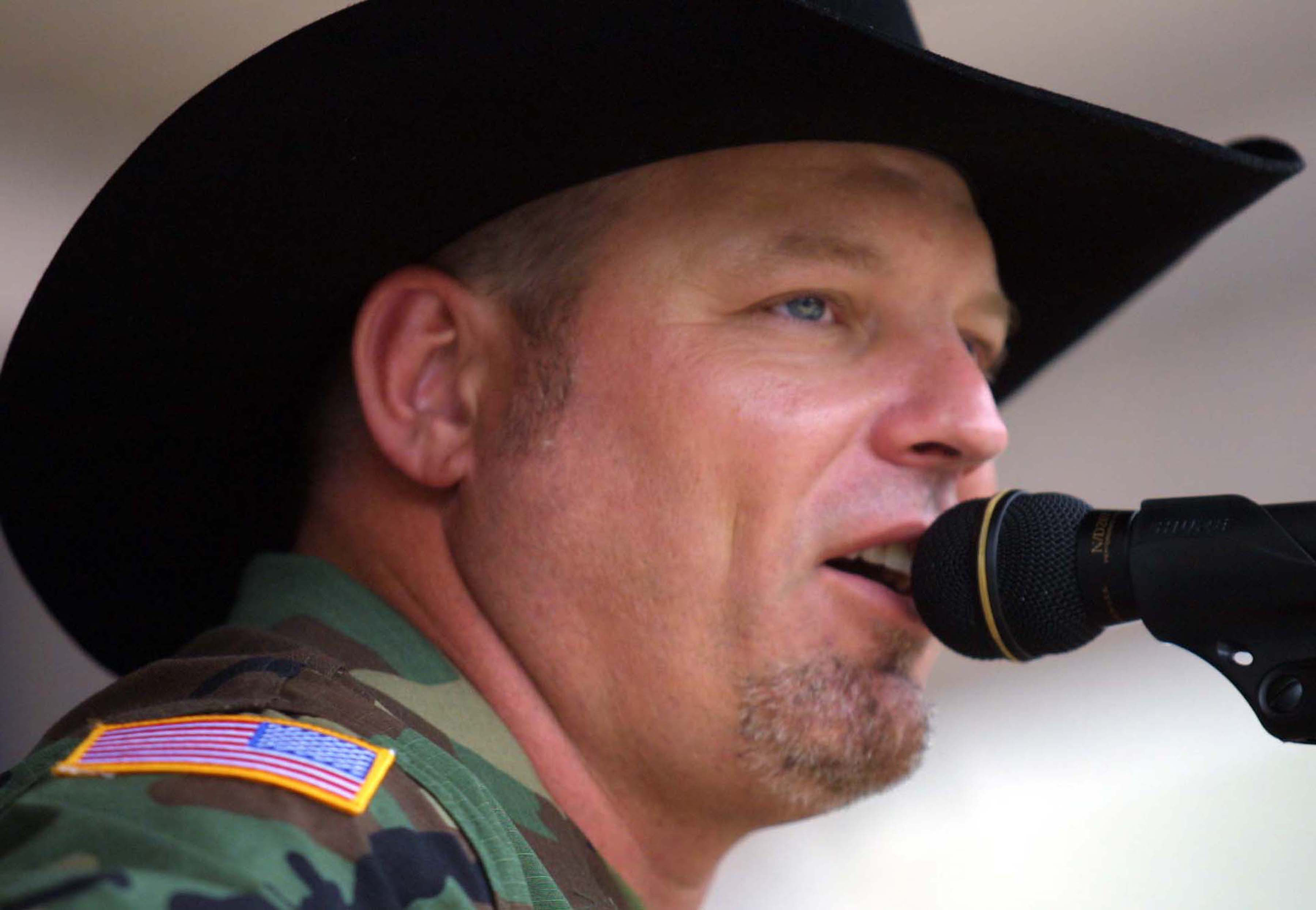
John Michael Montgomery had three number ones in 1994.

Hot Country Songs is a chart that ranks the top-performing country music songs in the United States, published by Billboard magazine. In 1994, 30 different songs topped the chart, then published under the title Hot Country Singles & Tracks, in 52 issues of the magazine, based on weekly airplay data from country music radio stations compiled by Nielsen Broadcast Data Systems.

Two artists reached number one with three different songs in 1994. Clay Walker topped the chart with "Live Until I Die", "Dreaming with My Eyes Open" and "If I Could Make a Living", and John Michael Montgomery achieved the feat with "I Swear", "Be My Baby Tonight" and "If You've Got Love". Montgomery also spent the most cumulative weeks at the top of the chart, with seven, one more than Neal McCoy, who spent six weeks at the top with "No Doubt About It" and "Wink". Despite this level of chart success in 1994, the two songs remain McCoy's only number one hits. Clay Walker's three number ones each spent only a single week in the top spot. Other artists to achieve more than one number one in 1994 were Brooks & Dunn, Joe Diffie, Faith Hill and Alan Jackson.

In addition to McCoy, acts who reached number one for the first time in 1994 included Mary Chapin Carpenter with "Shut Up and Kiss Me", Little Texas with "My Love", and John Berry with "Your Love Amazes Me". Trisha Yearwood spent two weeks at number one in September with "XXX's and OOO's (An American Girl)", which went on to serve as the theme song to her Food Network show Trisha's Southern Kitchen. The track was co-written by Alice Randall, who became only the second African-American woman to co-write a number one based on country music radio plays.

== Chart history ==
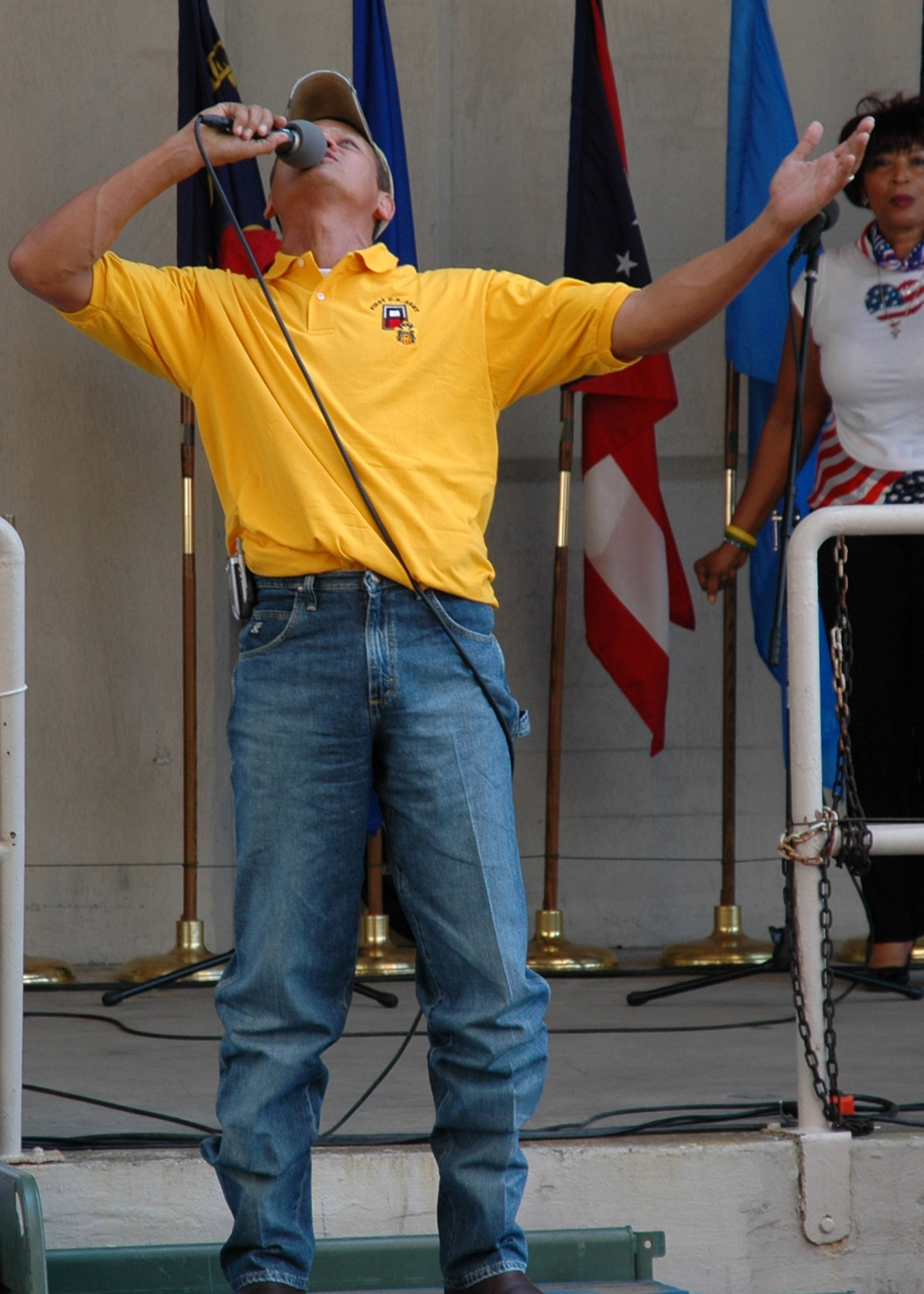
Neal McCoy had two number ones in 1994, which spent a combined six weeks at the top of the chart, but they remain the only chart-toppers of his career.

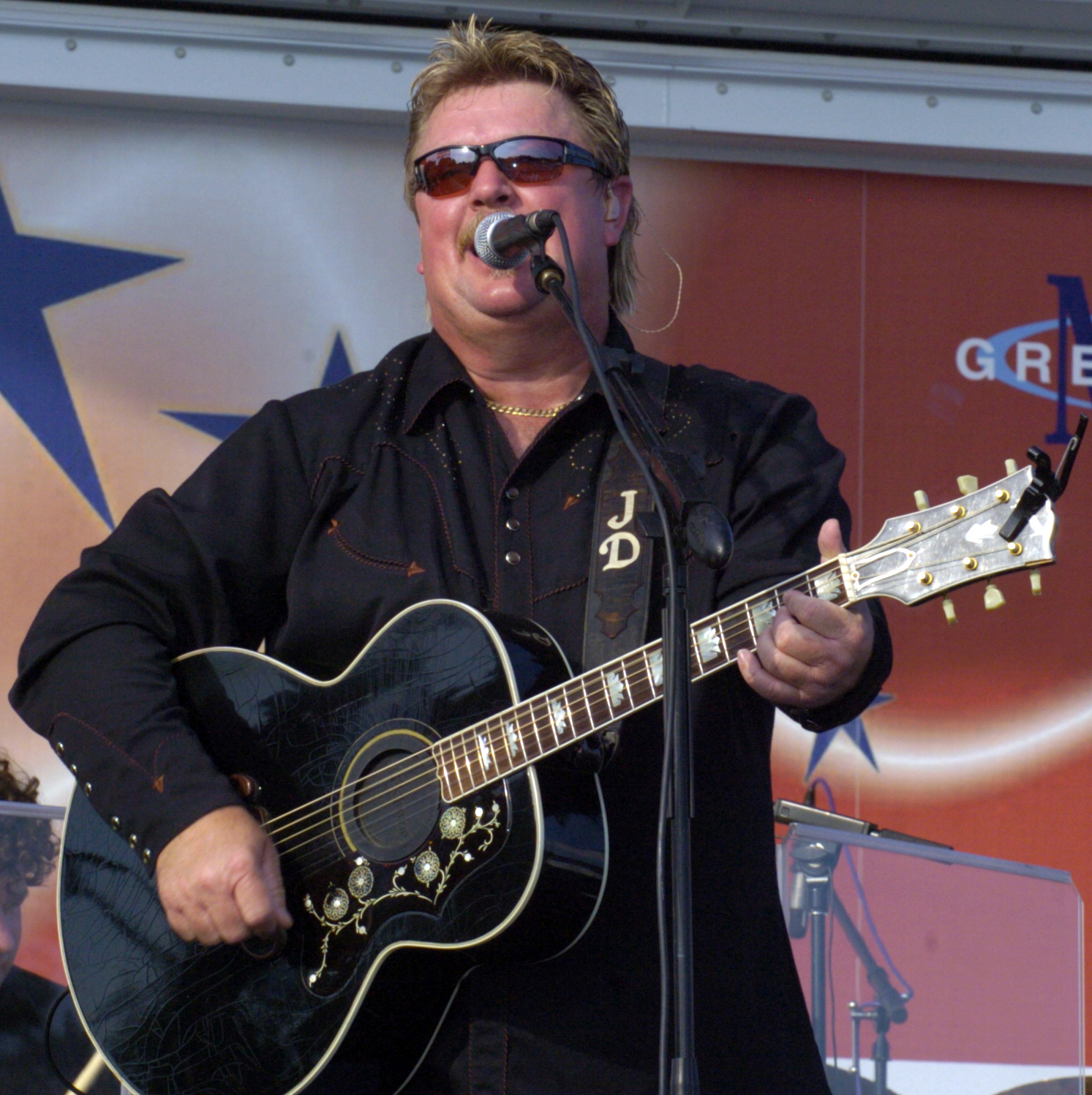
Joe Diffie was one of several acts to have two number ones in 1994.

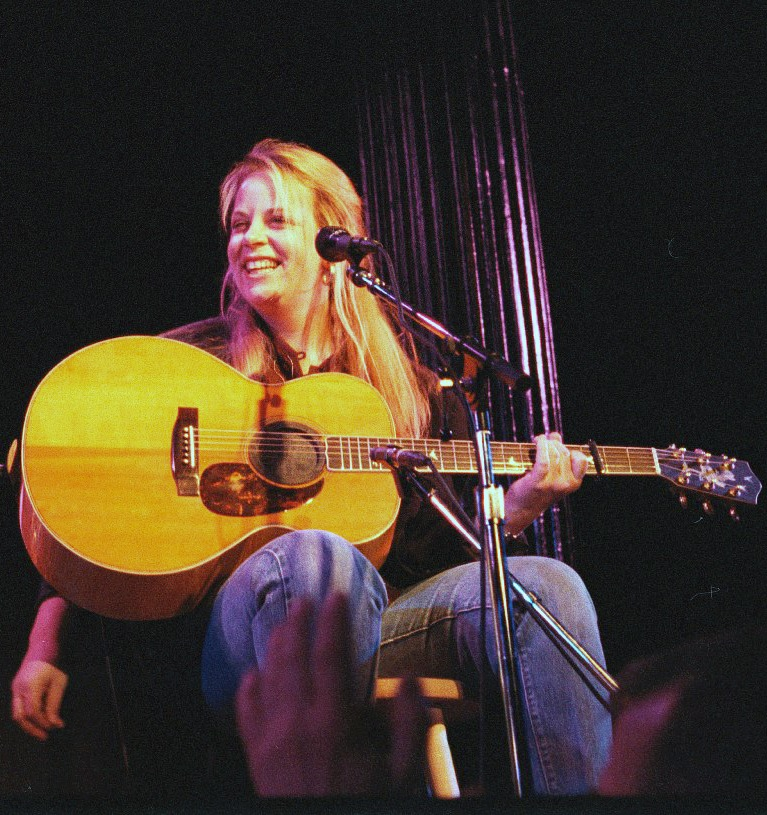
Mary Chapin Carpenter had her only number one to date in 1994.

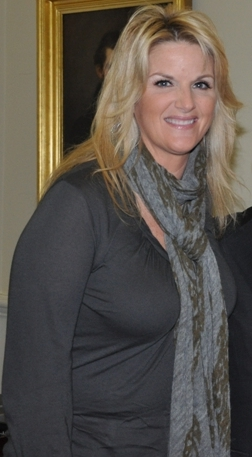
Trisha Yearwood spent two weeks at number one with "XXX's and OOO's (An American Girl)", which went on to serve as the theme song to her Food Network show Trisha's Southern Kitchen.

Issue date	Title	Artist(s)	Ref.
January 1	"Wild One"	Faith Hill	
January 8	"Wild One"	Faith Hill	
January 15	"Wild One"	Faith Hill	
January 22	"Wild One"	Faith Hill	
January 29	"Live Until I Die"	Clay Walker	
February 5	"I Swear"	John Michael Montgomery	
February 12	"I Swear"	John Michael Montgomery	
February 19	"I Swear"	John Michael Montgomery	
February 26	"I Swear"	John Michael Montgomery	
March 5	"I Just Wanted You to Know"	Mark Chesnutt	
March 12	"Tryin' to Get Over You"	Vince Gill	
March 19	"No Doubt About It"	Neal McCoy	
March 26	"No Doubt About It"	Neal McCoy	
April 2	"My Love"	Little Texas	
April 9	"My Love"	Little Texas	
April 16	"If the Good Die Young"	Tracy Lawrence	
April 23	"If the Good Die Young"	Tracy Lawrence	
April 30	"Piece of My Heart"	Faith Hill	
May 7	"A Good Run of Bad Luck"	Clint Black	
May 14	"If Bubba Can Dance (I Can Too)"	Shenandoah	
May 21	"Your Love Amazes Me"	John Berry	
May 28	"Don't Take the Girl"	Tim McGraw	
June 4	"Don't Take the Girl"	Tim McGraw	
June 11	"That Ain't No Way to Go"	Brooks & Dunn	
June 18	"Wink"	Neal McCoy	
June 25	"Wink"	Neal McCoy	
July 2	"Wink"	Neal McCoy	
July 9	"Wink"	Neal McCoy	
July 16	"Foolish Pride"	Travis Tritt	
July 23	"Summertime Blues"	Alan Jackson	
July 30	"Summertime Blues"	Alan Jackson	
August 6	"Summertime Blues"	Alan Jackson	
August 13	"Be My Baby Tonight"	John Michael Montgomery	
August 20	"Be My Baby Tonight"	John Michael Montgomery	
August 27	"Dreaming with My Eyes Open"	Clay Walker	
September 3	"Whisper My Name"	Randy Travis	
September 10	"XXX's and OOO's (An American Girl)"	Trisha Yearwood	
September 17	"XXX's and OOO's (An American Girl)"	Trisha Yearwood	
September 24	"Third Rock from the Sun"	Joe Diffie	
October 1	"Third Rock from the Sun"	Joe Diffie	
October 8	"Who's That Man"	Toby Keith	
October 15	"She's Not the Cheatin' Kind"	Brooks & Dunn	
October 22	"She's Not the Cheatin' Kind"	Brooks & Dunn	
October 29	"Livin' on Love"	Alan Jackson	
November 5	"Livin' on Love"	Alan Jackson	
November 12	"Livin' on Love"	Alan Jackson	
November 19	"Shut Up and Kiss Me"	Mary Chapin Carpenter	
November 26	"If I Could Make a Living"	Clay Walker	
December 3	"The Big One"	George Strait	
December 10	"If You've Got Love"	John Michael Montgomery	
December 17	"Pickup Man"	Joe Diffie	
December 24	"Pickup Man"	Joe Diffie	
December 31	"Pickup Man"	Joe Diffie	

== See also ==
- 1994 in music
- List of artists who reached number one on the U.S. country chart
