= No Doubt About It =

No Doubt About It may refer to:

== Albums ==
- No Doubt About It (album) or the title song (see below), by Neal McCoy, 1993
- No Doubt About It, by Terri Gibbs, 2002

== Songs ==
- "No Doubt About It", by The Esquires, 1968
- "No Doubt About It", by The J. Geils Band from Ladies Invited, 1973
- "No Doubt About It", by Hot Chocolate, 1980
- "No Doubt About It", by the Bay City Rollers from Ricochet, 1981
- "No Doubt About It", by Wipers from Follow Blind, 1987
- "No Doubt About It", by Neal McCoy, 1993
- "No Doubt About It", by Paul Carrack from I Know That Name, 2008
- "No Doubt About It", by Jussie Smollett and Pitbull from Empire: Original Soundtrack Season 2 Volume 1, 2015
- "No Doubt About It", by ABBA, from Voyage, 2021

== See also ==
- Ain't No Doubt About It (disambiguation)
