= Ain't No Doubt About It =

Ain't No Doubt About It may refer to:

- Ain't No Doubt About It, an album by DJ Magic Mike and MC Madness, 1991

== Songs ==
- "Ain't No Doubt About It", composed by Jimmy George and Stephanie Spruill
- "Ain't No Doubt About It", by C.A. Quintet
- "Ain't No Doubt About It", by The Emotions from Sunbeam
- "Ain't No Doubt About It", by Eric Darius from Goin' All Out
- "Ain't No Doubt About It", by Game, an outtake from The R.E.D. Album
- "Ain't No Doubt About It", by Mavis Staples from If All I Was Was Black
- "Ain't No Doubt About It", by The Sylvers from Something Special
- "Ain't No Doubt About It", by Wilson Pickett from Wilson Pickett in Philadelphia
- "Eyes For You (Ain't No Doubt About It)", by Daryl Hall from Laughing Down Crying

== See also ==
- No Doubt About It (disambiguation)
