= Where Forever Begins =

Where Forever Begins may refer to:

- Where Forever Begins (Neal McCoy album), 1992
- Where Forever Begins (Ken Mellons album), 1995
