= Take a Knee, My Ass (I Won't Take a Knee) =

Promotional single by Neal McCoy
- Released: November 10, 2017
- Genre: Patriotic; country
- Length: 3:00
- Label: Nealbilly Music 903
- Songwriter: Dan Roberts
- Producer: Unknown

Neal McCoy singles chronology
"Can You Do This" (2014)	"Take a Knee, My Ass (I Won't Take a Knee)" (2017)

"Take a Knee, My Ass (I Won't Take a Knee)" (stylized as Take a Knee ... My Ass!!) is a song recorded by American country music artist Neal McCoy, and was released on November 10, 2017. The song conveys McCoy's self-avowed patriotism, as well as his displeasure towards football players protesting police brutality during the national anthem.

== Background ==
McCoy stated that "Take a Knee, My Ass" was made in response to American football players' kneeling during the national anthem; McCoy found the footballers' actions disrespectful. However, McCoy said that he empathised with their cause. He also intended for the song to "bring people together".

Dan Roberts, who was a fellow country singer and McCoy's friend, wrote the original lyrics of "Take a Knee, My Ass". McCoy claimed to have edited out some lyrics that were more "uncomfortable for me" and "more race-oriented". Before recording the song, McCoy performed it live at a concert in Missouri.

== Release and reception ==
I’ve entertained our troops in Pakistan, Afghanistan, Iraq and all over the world. So, no, this is not a money grab. This is a guy that believes in our country, that does not like people kneeling, not standing with their hands over their hearts, for the Pledge of Allegiance and the National Anthem. That’s what I’m about.

— Neal McCoy

"Take a Knee, My Ass" was released on November 10, 2017, to commercial success; it peaked at number four on Amazon's and iTunes digital country songs charts. It also reached the Top 50 of Billboard's Hot Country Songs chart and was described as McCoy's "revival" hit.

However, the song was not favourably received by critics, many of whom criticised McCoy's mischaracterisation of kneeling during the anthem as disrespectful towards the military. Sean Newell of Vice Sports described it as "dumb, disingenuous, and devoid of any redeeming qualities" and derided its rhyme scheme and melody. Rachel Kraus of Mashable called the song "trash", and wrote that "(it) represents the most insidious form of bigotry masked as patriotism. It's simplistic, divisive, and wrong-headed." William Hughes of The A.V. Club said of the song, "(it) sounds, to the casual listener, like McCoy is ordering his own buttocks to drop to the ground and pay their ass-y respects."

== Chart history ==
Chart (2017)	Peak position
Country Digital Download Sales (Billboard)	19
US Hot Country Songs (Billboard)	49

== Release history ==
Region	Date	Format	Label
United States	10 November 2017	Digital download	Nealbilly Music 903

== See also ==
- Neal McCoy discography
