= Be Good at It =

Studio album by Neal McCoy
- Released: October 28, 1997
- Genre: Country
- Length: 38:25
- Label: Atlantic
- Producer: Kyle Lehning

Neal McCoy chronology
Greatest Hits (1997)	Be Good at It (1997)	The Life of the Party (1999)

Be Good at It is the sixth studio album by American country music artist Neal McCoy. Released in late 1997 on Atlantic Records, it features the singles "If You Can't Be Good, Be Good at It"; "Party On"; and"Love Happens Like That""21 to 17" was recorded (under the title "21-17") by Doug Supernaw on his 1999 album Fadin' Renegade.

Professional ratings
Review scores
Source	Rating
Allmusic	link
Country Standard Time	negative link

== Track listing ==
No.	Title	Writer(s)	Length
1.	"If You Can't Be Good (Be Good at It)"	Blue Miller; Troy Seals	3:26
2.	"I Know You"	Chris Farren; Chuck Jones	3:35
3.	"You'll Always Be in My Life"	Stephen Allen Davis; Robin Lerner	4:06
4.	"Same Boots"	Wil Nance; Steve Dean	3:23
5.	"Back"	Craig Wiseman; Ronnie Samoset	3:05
6.	"Love Happens Like That"	Aaron Barker; Ron Harbin; Anthony L. Smith	2:41
7.	"Party On"	Karen Taylor-Good; Paul Williams	3:17
8.	"Broken Record"	Jess Brown; Brett Jones	3:33
9.	"21 to 17"	Reese Wilson	4:23
10.	"Basic Goodbye"	Monty Holmes; Devon O'Day	3:22
11.	"The Shake"	Butch Carr; Jon McElroy	3:34
Total length:			38:25

== Personnel ==
- Eddie Bayers - drums
- Larry Byrom - acoustic guitar, electric guitar, gut string guitar, slide guitar
- Mark Casstevens - acoustic guitar
- Dusty Drake - background vocals
- Paul Franklin - steel guitar
- Sonny Garrish - steel guitar
- Aubrey Haynie - fiddle, mandolin
- Jason Lehning - organ
- Paul Leim - drums
- Chris Leuzinger - acoustic guitar, electric guitar
- Neal McCoy - lead vocals
- Terry McMillan - harmonica, percussion
- Brent Mason - 12-string guitar, electric guitar
- Nashville String Machine - strings
- Steve Nathan - keyboards, Hammond organ, piano, Wurlitzer
- Donny Parenteau - fiddle
- Michael Rhodes - bass guitar
- Matt Rollings - Hammond organ, piano
- Brent Rowan - electric guitar
- Russell Terrell - background vocals
- Bergen White - string arrangements
- Dennis Wilson - background vocals
- Curtis Wright - background vocals
- Curtis Young - background vocals

== Charts ==
=== Weekly charts ===
Chart (1997)	Peak position
Canadian Country Albums (RPM)	31
US Billboard 200	135
US Top Country Albums (Billboard)	23

=== Year-end charts ===
Chart (1998)	Position
US Top Country Albums (Billboard)	61
