= Alvin Law =

Motivational speaker and radio broadcaster

- Born: 1960 (age 65–66); Yorkton, Saskatchewan
- Occupations: Motivational Speaker, radio broadcaster, Musician

Alvin Law (born 1960 in Yorkton, Saskatchewan) is a motivational speaker and former radio broadcaster.

Law was born without arms as a consequence of his mother's use of thalidomide while pregnant. His birth parents put him up for adoption, and he was raised by foster parents Hilda and Jack Law.

Law learned to perform routine activities using his feet alone, including eating, dressing and grooming himself, driving, sewing, playing sports, and playing drums, piano, and trombone. He attended regular elementary and high schools, even though at the time disabled children were usually placed in institutions or special education programs.

After graduating from college, Law embarked on a successful career in radio broadcasting. He expressed an interest in moving to television, but network executives were unsure of how the public would react to an armless news anchor.

Law began dabbling in motivational speaking in 1981. In 1988 he made this his full-time occupation with the founding of AJL Communications Ltd. He is the subject of two award-winning documentaries, and is the author of a book, Alvin's Laws of Life: 5 Steps To Successfully Overcome Anything. He has also dabbled in acting, his most notable role to date being a preacher in the X-Files episode "Humbug", and a supporting role in Harmony Korine’s 1999 movie “Julien Donkey-Boy”.

In 1986, Law ran as a Saskatchewan Progressive Conservative Party candidate in the 1986 provincial election, losing to John Solomon in the constituency of Regina North West.

Law served on the national board of the Canadian Association of Professional Speakers. For many years, Law was a mainstay on the annual telethon Telemiracle.

In 2018, Law was inducted into the Canadian Disability Hall of Fame.
