= The Life of the Party (album) =

Studio album by Neal McCoy
- Released: January 19, 1999
- Recorded: Emerald Sound Studio, Sound Stage & 17 Grand, Nashville, TN – 1999
- Genre: Country
- Length: 37:33
- Label: Atlantic
- Producer: Kyle Lehning

Neal McCoy chronology
Be Good at It (1997)	The Life of the Party (1999)	24-7-365 (2000)

Professional ratings
Review scores
Source	Rating
Allmusic	link
Country Standard Time	negative link

The Life of the Party is the seventh studio album by American country music artist Neal McCoy. Released in 1999, it contains the singles "I Was" and "The Girls of Summer", which peaked at #37 and #42, respectively, on the Billboard Hot Country Singles & Tracks (now Hot Country Songs) charts that year. "Straighten up and Fly Right" is a cover of a Nat King Cole song.

== Track listing ==
No.	Title	Writer(s)	Length
1.	"I Was"	Phil Vassar; Charlie Black	3:13
2.	"Lipstick on the Radio"	Bob DiPiero; Gerry House	3:08
3.	"Only You"	Brett Jones	3:27
4.	"The Girls of Summer"	Randy Boudreaux; Bobby Carmichael	3:05
5.	"New Old Songs"	Dave Gibson	3:59
6.	"The Life of the Party"	Allen Shamblin; Billy Kirsch	2:55
7.	"Completely"	Marc Beeson; Jeff Wood	4:13
8.	"That's Not Her"	Jerry Salley; Steve Leslie	3:39
9.	"Ain't Nothin' Like It"	Vassar; Black; Tommy Rocco	3:41
10.	"The Strongest Man in the World"	Ron Harbin; Ed Hill; Kim Tribble	3:40
11.	"Straighten Up and Fly Right"	Nat King Cole; Irving Mills	2:17
Total length:			37:33

== Personnel ==
- Mark Casstevens – acoustic guitar
- Thom Flora – background vocals
- Paul Franklin – steel guitar
- Sonny Garrish – steel guitar
- Jim Horn – saxophone
- John Barlow Jarvis – keyboards
- Paul Leim – drums
- Brent Mason – electric guitar
- Neal McCoy – lead vocals
- Gene Miller – background vocals
- Steve Nathan – keyboards
- Donny Parenteau – fiddle
- Michael Rhodes – bass guitar
- Tom Roady – percussion
- Chris Rodriguez – background vocals
- Harry Stinson – background vocals
- Billy Joe Walker Jr. – six string electric bass
- Dennis Wilson – background vocals
- Glenn Worf – bass guitar
- Curtis Young – background vocals

== Chart performance ==
Chart (1999)	Peak position
U.S. Billboard Top Country Albums	24
Canadian RPM Country Albums	21
