= You Gotta Love That =

Studio album by Neal McCoy
- Released: January 24, 1995
- Recorded: 1994
- Studio: Masterfonics, Nashville, TN
- Genre: Country
- Length: 33:11
- Label: Atlantic
- Producer: Barry Beckett

Neal McCoy chronology
No Doubt About It (1994)	You Gotta Love That (1995)	Neal McCoy (1996)

Singles from You Gotta Love That
- 1. "For a Change" Released: December 19, 1994; 2. "They're Playin' Our Song" Released: April 24, 1995; 3. "If I Was a Drinkin' Man" Released: August 12, 1995; 4. "You Gotta Love That" Released: January 1, 1996

Professional ratings
Review scores
Source	Rating
Entertainment Weekly	C

You Gotta Love That is the fourth studio album by American country music artist Neal McCoy, released in 1995 via Atlantic Records. It includes the singles "For a Change", "They're Playin' Our Song", "If I Was a Drinkin' Man", and the title track. Of these, all but "If I Was a Drinkin' Man" were Top 5 hits on the Billboard Hot Country Singles & Tracks (now Hot Country Songs) charts.

== Track listing ==
No.	Title	Writer(s)	Length
1.	"You Gotta Love That"	Jess Brown; Brett Jones	2:36
2.	"For a Change"	John Scott Sherrill; Steve Seskin	3:22
3.	"Y-O-U"	Craig Wiseman; Thom McHugh	3:47
4.	"Please Don't Leave Me Now"	Skip Ewing; Don Sampson	4:09
5.	"Twang"	Tony Martin; Reese Wilson	2:57
6.	"They're Playin' Our Song"	Bob DiPiero; John Jarrard; Mark D. Sanders	3:22
7.	"Spending Every Minute in Love"	DiPiero; Jim Photoglo	3:26
8.	"Plain Jane"	J. Fred Knobloch; Gary Scruggs	3:05
9.	"You're Backin' Up"	Chuck Jones; Gregory Swint; Chris Waters	3:01
10.	"If I Was a Drinkin' Man"	Byron Hill; J. B. Rudd	3:21
Total length:			33:11

== Personnel ==
- Eddie Bayers - drums
- Barry Beckett - keyboards
- Paul Franklin - steel guitar
- Neal McCoy - lead vocals
- Terry McMillan - percussion
- Phil Naish - keyboards
- Bobby Ogdin - keyboards
- Donny Parenteau - fiddle, mandolin
- Don Potter - acoustic guitar
- Michael Rhodes - bass guitar
- Brent Rowan - electric guitar
- John Wesley Ryles - background vocals
- Harry Stinson - background vocals
- Dennis Wilson - background vocals
- Curtis Young - background vocals

== Charts ==
=== Weekly charts ===
Chart (1995)	Peak position
US Billboard 200	68
US Top Country Albums (Billboard)	10

=== Year-end charts ===
Chart (1995)	Position
US Top Country Albums (Billboard)	34

== Certifications ==
Region	Certification	Certified units/sales
United States (RIAA)	Platinum	1,000,000^{^}
^{^} Shipments figures based on certification alone.
