= At This Moment (Neal McCoy album) =

Studio album by Neal McCoy
- Released: November 20, 1990
- Studio: Scruggs (Nashville)
- Genre: Country
- Label: Atlantic
- Producer: Nelson Larkin

Neal McCoy chronology
At This Moment (1990)	Where Forever Begins (1992)

Singles from At This Moment
- 1. "If I Built You a Fire" Released: October 31, 1990; 2. "Hillbilly Blue" Released: March 1991; 3. "This Time I Hurt Her More (Than She Loves Me)" Released: July 1991

At This Moment is the debut studio album by American country music artist Neal McCoy, released on November 20, 1990, on Atlantic Records Nashville. "If I Built You a Fire", "Hillbilly Blue" and "This Time I Hurt Her More (Than She Loves Me)" were all released as singles from this album. Although "Hillbilly Blue" did not chart, the other two singles both entered the lower regions of the Hot Country Songs charts. "If I Built You a Fire" was a Top 20 country hit in Canada as well.

== Critical reception ==
A review in Billboard was mixed, stating that "McCoy is most convincing here in his cover of other people's hits...The newer material is unremarkable."

== Track listing ==
1. "If I Built You a Fire" (Don Sampson, Monty Holmes) – 3:37
2. "Take My Heart" (Ron Reynolds, Mickey Stripling) – 2:40
3. "Down on the River" (Kostas, Wayland Patton) – 4:21
4. "Hillbilly Blue" (Bernie Nelson) – 3:23
5. "This Time I Hurt Her More (Than She Loves Me)" (Earl Thomas Conley, Mary Larkin) – 2:25
6. "Somebody Hold Me (Until She Passes By)" (Sue Richards, Ava Aldridge, Ray Aldridge) – 2:55
7. "The Big Heat" (Bob Mould, David Wills, Rick West) – 3:38
8. "If the Walls Had Ears" (John Alexander, Pal Rakes) – 3:27
9. "At This Moment" (Billy Vera) – 3:18
10. "This Time I'm Takin' My Time" (Mould, Wyatt Easterling) – 3:53

== Personnel ==
- Michael Black – background vocals
- Larry Byrom – electric guitar
- Glen Duncan – fiddle
- Wyatt Easterling – background vocals
- Sonny Garrish – steel guitar
- Steve Gibson – electric guitar
- Bill Hullett – electric guitar
- Clayton Ivey – keyboards
- Jerry Kroon – drums
- Gary Lunn – bass guitar
- Neal McCoy – lead vocals
- Weldon Myrick – steel guitar
- Ron "Snake" Reynolds – electric guitar, percussion, background vocals
- John Willis – acoustic guitar
- Dennis Wilson – background vocals
- Curtis Young – background vocals
