= If You Can't Be Good (Be Good at It) =

Single by Neal McCoy

from the album Be Good at It
- Released: October 18, 1997
- Genre: Country
- Length: 3:26
- Label: Atlantic
- Songwriters: Troy Seals, Blue Miller
- Producer: Kyle Lehning

Neal McCoy singles chronology
"The Shake" (1997)	"If You Can't Be Good (Be Good at It)" (1997)	"Party On" (1998)

"If You Can't Be Good (Be Good at It)" is a song written by Troy Seals and Blue Miller, and recorded by American country music artist Neal McCoy. It was released in October 1997 as the first single from the album Be Good at It. The song reached #22 on the Billboard Hot Country Singles & Tracks chart.

== Critical reception ==
A review in Billboard noted that the production of Kyle Lehning gave the song a "different feel sonically" from McCoy's previous releases, but added that "it's still the personality in McCoy's voice that sells this type of tune."

== Chart performance ==
Chart (1997–1998)	Peak position
Canada Country Singles (RPM)	15
US Hot Country Songs (Billboard)	22
