= Neal McCoy (album) =

Studio album by Neal McCoy
- Released: June 4, 1996
- Genre: Country music
- Length: 34:07
- Label: Atlantic
- Producer: Barry Beckett

Neal McCoy chronology
You Gotta Love That! (1995)	Neal McCoy (1996)	Greatest Hits (1997)

Singles from Neal McCoy
- 1. "Then You Can Tell Me Goodbye" Released: May 18, 1996; 2. "Going, Going, Gone" Released: September 28, 1996; 3. "That Woman of Mine" Released: January 1997

Professional ratings
Review scores
Source	Rating
Allmusic	3/5 stars
Country Standard Time	(negative)

Neal McCoy is the self-titled fifth studio album by American country music artist Neal McCoy, released in 1996. It features the singles "Then You Can Tell Me Goodbye" (a cover of The Casinos' hit single from 1967), "Going, Going, Gone" (previously recorded by Bryan White on his self-titled debut album), and "That Woman of Mine". The song "Hillbilly Rap" is a country rap song which samples "The Banana Boat Song", "The Ballad of Jed Clampett", and "Rapper's Delight".

== Track listing ==
1. "That Woman of Mine" (Don Cook, Tim Mensy) – 2:53
2. "Then You Can Tell Me Goodbye" (John D. Loudermilk) – 3:17
3. "Me Too" (Wendell Mobley, Jim Robinson) – 3:16
4. "It Should've Happened That Way" (Steve Dorff, Michael Lunn, Jeff Pennig) – 3:18
5. "I Ain't Complainin'" (Jess Brown, Aggie Brown) – 3:09
6. "Going, Going, Gone" (Steve Cropper, Bob DiPiero, John Scott Sherrill) – 3:50
7. "Betcha Can't Do That Again" (Gene Dobbins, John Ramey, Bobby Taylor) – 3:38
8. "She Can" (Austin Gardner, Steve Seskin) – 3:44
9. "If It Hadn't Been So Good" (Walt Aldridge, John Jarrard) – 2:58
10. "Hillbilly Rap" – 4:04
  - "The Banana Boat Song" written by Irving Burgie and William Attaway
  - "The Ballad of Jed Clampett" written by Paul Henning
  - "Rapper's Delight" written by Bernard Edwards and Nile Rodgers
  - arranged by Neal McCoy

== Personnel ==
- Eddie Bayers – drums
- Barry Beckett – keyboards
- Paul Franklin – steel guitar
- Neal McCoy – lead vocals
- Terry McMillan – percussion, harmonica
- Phil Naish – keyboards
- Bobby Ogdin – keyboards
- Donny Parenteau – fiddle, mandolin
- Don Potter – acoustic guitar
- Michael Rhodes – bass guitar
- Brent Rowan – electric guitar
- John Wesley Ryles – background vocals
- Dennis Wilson – background vocals
- Curtis "Mr. Harmony" Young – background vocals

== Charts ==
=== Weekly charts ===
Chart (1996)	Peak position
Canadian Country Albums (RPM)	7
US Billboard 200	61
US Top Country Albums (Billboard)	7

=== Year-end charts ===
Chart (1996)	Position
US Top Country Albums (Billboard)	47
