= Telemiracle =

Annual telethon in Saskatchewan, Canada

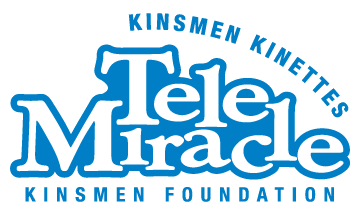
- Genre: Telethon
- Presented by: Kinsmen and Kinettes of Saskatchewan
- Opening theme: Thank You by Beverley Mahood
- Ending theme: O Canada
- Country of origin: Canada
- Original language: English
- No. of seasons: 50 (as of 2026)

Production
- Production locations: Saskatoon or Regina (alternating)
- Running time: 20 hours, except 2016 (21 hours) and 2026 (22 hours). All include a 30-minute break for national news at 11:00 pm.

Original release
- Network: CTV Saskatchewan (1977-present)
- Release: 1977 – present

Telemiracle is an annual telethon organized by the Kinsmen and Kinettes in Saskatchewan, Canada, for the benefit of the Kinsmen Foundation. Initially broadcast on both CTV and CBC affiliates in Saskatchewan, it is now broadcast, commercial-free, exclusively on the province's CTV affiliates–CKCK in Regina, CFQC in Saskatoon, CIPA in Prince Albert and CICC in Yorkton.

The telethon is generally broadcast the first full weekend of March, but in a rare and COVID-19-induced exception to that rule, the 45th edition of the telethon was based at Prairieland Park in Saskatoon on February 27 and 28, 2021. Like the 2021 telethon, the 46th edition of the telethon took place without a live audience, in Regina's International Trade Centre on March 5 and 6, 2022. Telemiracle 47 returned to Saskatoon's Prairieland Park on February 25 and 26, 2023. Telemiracle 48, returned to Regina's REAL District on February 24 and 25, 2024, with a limited live audience. Telemiracle 49 originated from Saskatoon's Praireland Park on March 1 and 2, 2025, also with a limited live audience. Telemiracle 50 also originated from Saskatoon on February 28 and March 1, 2026.

== History ==
One of the many totals during the telethon

Originally, the Kinsmen had the idea to have a car raffle to raise funds to help with all the requests for assistance they received but the government wouldn't allow it. So instead, they came up with the idea for a telethon. In 1977, the first telethon raised more than CAD $1 million, which at the time was considered a record for per capita telethon fund-raising in a 20-hour period (the province had a population of less than 1 million people at the time). The telethon passed the $2 million mark for the first time in 1983, and the $3 million mark in 2001. Telemiracle has exceeded the $4 million mark sixteen times and $5 million twelve times, most recently in 2024. Telemiracle exceeded the $7 million mark for the first time on March 4, 2018, and the $8 million mark for the first time on March 6, 2022. The 2024 telethon marked the first time the total finished above $6 million but below $7 million.

Early broadcasts of the telethon featured a mix of national and international celebrities such as John Allan Cameron, Gloria Loring, Alan Thicke, the Irish Rovers, Arte Johnson of Laugh-In, Bob McGrath of Sesame Street, game show personality Jim Perry, his daughter Erin Perry, singer and TV host Blake Emmons (who was the telethon's de facto host during the first few years, a post later taken over by Thicke in the 1980s and most recently by Beverley Mahood and Brad Johner), pianist Frank Mills and Saskatchewan-born motivational speaker Alvin Law. In recent years, the event has mostly attracted Canadian talent. Traditionally, the telethon alternates between the two major Saskatchewan cities of Saskatoon and Regina.

Bob McGrath, a regular fixture on Telemiracle for 38 years, was awarded the Commemorative Medal for the Centennial of Saskatchewan for this work by the Lieutenant Governor of Saskatchewan, Lynda Haverstock, on March 3, 2006. He announced during the 2015 telethon that it would be his last, but returned for the final four hours of the 2018 telethon.

Telemiracle 31 (2007), the first telethon to exceed the $5,000,000 pledge total, broke all previous records, with an official final total of $5,604,682. This record was broken in 2012 (Telemiracle 36) with a final total of $5,906,229. This record was once again broken on March 4, 2018 (Telemiracle 42) with a final total of $7,151,256. One bequest of over $1.2 million and one bequest of over $1.5 million contributed to the 2018 total. The current record is held by the 46th Telemiracle (2022); the total of $8,002,722 included a bequest of $1,779,771.20, the largest pledge—bequest or otherwise—in the telethon's history. The largest donation in the history came through at $2,350,000 at Telemiracle 50 via a bequest as well as setting a record drive of $10,521,072.

A scheduling mixup resulted in Telemiracle 32 being relocated to Saskatoon in 2008. A convention was booked in Regina for the days leading up to the telethon, meaning that the usual setup time was not available. Telemiracle was held in Saskatoon for 3 consecutive years. The telethon returned to Regina in 2010.

== Format ==
Telemiracle brings in many volunteers from across Canada.

Shown annually on CTV affiliates, the broadcast starts at 9 pm local time on the first Saturday in March (though for the first half of its history, it was often scheduled in February). The broadcast goes live to the host auditorium, where members of the national cast are introduced.

The previous theme was Mike + The Mechanics' 1986 hit "All I Need is a Miracle." it was replaced in 2011 with "You are the Miracle" by Brad Johner and Donny Parenteau. The theme song was replaced again in 2021 with "Thank You" by Beverley Mahood.

The broadcast takes its only break at 11pm local time to allow for the CTV affiliates to broadcast the CTV National News (anchors from which have appeared on the telethon itself, most notably Lloyd Robertson and Harvey Kirck in the late 1970s). The telethon (and live broadcast) continues during this 30 minute news break and at 11:30pm stations that aired the newscast once again rejoin the broadcast until the conclusion of the show on Sunday evening at 5pm Central Standard Time. The broadcast always concludes with "O Canada" and a balloon and confetti drop during which time some of the volunteers take to the stage to celebrate; up through 2010, a rendition of "With a Little Help from My Friends" was included with the closing festivities.

For the first time in 2009, the show went to other various locations in Saskatchewan outside of Saskatoon or Regina. It went to many of the smaller towns and cities across the province showcasing what the local residents have done to raise money. The practice continued in 2010 and, for COVID-induced reasons, again in 2021.

Telemiracle was streamed online on CTV's website for the first time in 2010.

While the show is now carried only on Saskatchewan CTV stations, the production crew is composed of approximately 200 volunteers representing several broadcast networks, many traveling from outside of the province.

In 2018 a pre-show called the Countdown Show was added. It starts at 6:30 pm local time and runs till approximately 8:45 pm. It is streamed live to Telemiracle's YouTube channel, from the lobby of the host auditorium. The Countdown Show is hosted by two members of the national cast and features 12 Saskatchewan Talent performances.

Since 2021, Telemiracle has been held in a modified format due to the COVID-19 pandemic, with no live audience and primarily pre-recorded performances. The production has also been held in a studio at Prairieland Park or International Trade Centre, rather than at TCU Place or Conexus Arts Centre as has been customary. A limited live audience of invited guests was reintroduced for 2023.

== Annual totals ==
Telemiracle's website doesn't display the annual totals and they don't set annual goals, but their FAQ notes that the telethon raised over $111 million through Telemiracle 39 in 2015, an amount that includes the $5,604,682 raised by Telemiracle 31 in 2007 and then-record $5,906,229 at Telemiracle 36 in 2012.

At the 37th Telemiracle in 2013, the Kinsmen and Kinettes were proud to announce that the lifetime total for Telemiracle had surpassed 100 million dollars. Telemiracle has an all-time total raised of $181,658,441 up to and including the 2026 event.

At the 50th Telemiracle in 2026, a brand new record total was raised, thanks in part to the largest bequest in the telethon’s history totalling $2.35 million. When the final tally was totalled up at 5:00 pm, a record of $10,521,072 was established.

Year	Telemiracle	Host City	Total	Ref
1977	1	Saskatoon	$1,214,210	
1978	2	Regina	$1,443,092	
1979	3	Saskatoon	$1,401,422	
1980	4	Regina	$1,551,837	
1981	5	Saskatoon	$1,800,924	
1982	6	Regina	$1,902,480	
1983	7	Saskatoon	$2,010,120	
1984	8	Regina	$1,920,215	
1985	9	Saskatoon	$2,012,424	
1986	10	Regina	$2,004,367	
1987	11	Saskatoon	$2,085,785	
1988	12	Regina	$2,470,577	
1989	13	Saskatoon	$1,965,721	
1990	14	Regina	$1,803,177	
1991	15	Saskatoon	$1,825,092	
1992	16	Regina	$2,003,610	
1993	17	Saskatoon	$2,114,688	
1994	18	Regina	$2,126,734	
1995	19	Saskatoon	$2,451,783	
1996	20	Regina	$2,306,420	
1997	21	Saskatoon	$2,740,578	
1998	22	Regina	$2,546,637	
1999	23	Saskatoon	$2,500,562	
2000	24	Regina	$2,683,424	
2001	25	Saskatoon	$3,515,611	
2002	26	Regina	$3,026,723	
2003	27	Saskatoon	$3,027,912	
2004	28	Regina	$3,528,410	
2005	29	Saskatoon	$3,440,296	
2006	30	Regina	$3,491,538	
2007	31	Saskatoon	$5,604,682	
2008	32	Saskatoon	$3,648,310	
2009	33	Saskatoon	$3,802,308	
2010	34	Regina	$4,010,314	
2011	35	Saskatoon	$4,635,768	
2012	36	Regina	$5,906,229	
2013	37	Saskatoon	$5,546,712	
2014	38	Regina	$5,285,744	
2015	39	Saskatoon	$4,312,457	
2016	40	Regina	$5,200,071	
2017	41	Saskatoon	$5,000,274	
2018	42	Regina	$7,151,256	
2019	43	Saskatoon	$5,619,214	
2020	44	Regina	$5,523,472	
2021	45	Saskatoon	$5,630,215	
2022	46	Regina	$8,002,722	
2023	47	Saskatoon	$5,519,229	
2024	48	Regina	$6,112,717	
2025	49	Saskatoon	$5,709,306	
2026	50	Saskatoon	$10,521,072	

== Notable guests ==
=== National and international ===
- Susan Aglukark - Canadian country music, folk, pop, and Aboriginal artist
- The Arrogant Worms - Canadian band
- Victoria Banks - Canadian country singer-songwriter and musician
- Barra MacNeils - Celtic and folk band from the Maritimes
- Jaydee Bixby - Runner up on season five of Canadian Idol
- Tracey Brown - country music singer/songwriter (Family Brown, Prescott Brown fame)
- Tal Bachman - Canadian rock singer and songwriter. Son of Randy Bachman
- Billy Barty (1924 – 2000) - "B-Movie" legend, stage and film actor (a Telemiracle regular up to the time of his death)
- Paul Brandt - Canadian singer-songwriter
- Lisa Brokop - Canadian country music singer-songwriter
- Jim Byrnes - blues musician and actor
- John Allan Cameron (1938 – 2006) - Canadian folk singer
- George Canyon - Canadian country singer-songwriter and musician
- Lorne Cardinal - Actor, best known for his role on Corner Gas
- Rita Chiarelli - Blues singer-songwriter and musician
- Burton Cummings - Singer-songwriter, musician, and former band member of The Guess Who
- Bobby Curtola (1943 - 2016) - Canadian rock and roll singer
- Leah Daniels - Canadian country singer
- Melanie Doane - Fiddle player, singer-songwriter
- Doc Walker - Canadian country band
- Blake Emmons (1944 - 2026) - Singer and TV host
- Farmer's Daughter - Canadian country music trio
- Sue Foley - Blues singer-songwriter and guitarist
- George Fox - Canadian country music singer-songwriter and musician
- Lance Frazier - Professional football player
- Lawrence Gowan - Canadian singer
- Adam Gregory - Canadian country singer-songwriter and musician
- Liz Grogan - Canadian television hostess
- Harlequin - Canadian rock band
- Rolf Harris (1930 - 2023) - comedian, singer/songwriter ("Jake the Peg," "Tie Me Kangaroo Down, Sport" fame)
- Jeff Healey (1966 - 2008) - Canadian jazz, rock, blues, and hard rock singer-songwriter and musician
- Headpins - Canadian rock band
- The Heartbroken - Canadian country music band
- The Higgins - Canadian country, rock, and pop band
- High Valley - Canadian country and Christian band
- Justin Hines - Canadian pop singer
- Honeymoon Suite - Canadian rock/pop rock band
- Irish Rovers - Celtic and folk group
- Carly Rae Jepsen - Canadian singer-songwriter and 2007 Canadian Idol finalist
- Arte Johnson (1929 - 2019) - Laugh-In cast member
- Marc Jordan - Canadian singer-songwriter
- Michael Kaeshammer - Canadian boogie-woogie pianist, vocalist, composer, and arranger
- Joan Kennedy - Canadian country music singer
- Harvey Kirck (1928 - 2002) - CTV National News anchor
- Richard Kline - Actor (Three's Company)
- Lace - Canadian country music group
- Nicolette Larson (1952 - 1997) - American singer
- Shari Lewis (1933 - 1998) - ventriloquist, children's entertainer
- Gloria Loring - Singer, actress
- Ashley MacIsaac - East coast singer, songwriter, fiddler
- Rita MacNeil (1944 - 2013) - Canadian country music, Celtic, and folk singer
- Beverley Mahood - Canadian country singer and CMT Canada personality
- Charlie Major - Canadian country music singer-songwriter and musician
- John McDermott - Canadian singer, songwriter, multi-instrumentalist
- Bob McGrath (1932 - 2022) - Sesame Street cast member who took part in 38 Telemiracles; announced his retirement from the series in 2015
- Jason McCoy - Canadian singer-songwriter and musician
- Frank Mills - Pianist
- Alannah Myles - Canadian singer-songwriter
- Sierra Noble - Canadian fiddler, singer-songwriter, and multi-instrumentalist
- One More Girl - Canadian country duo
- Stella Parton - sister to Dolly Parton, country singer-songwriter
- The Northern Pikes - Canadian rock band
- Fred Penner - Singer, songwriter, musician, and children's entertainer
- Jim Perry (1933 - 2015) - former game show host
- Prescott-Brown - Canadian country music trio
- Ronnie Prophet (1937 - 2018) - Canadian country music singer-songwriter and musician
- Jimmy Rankin - Canadian country, folk singer-songwriter, and musician
- Matt Rapley - Canadian R&B and gospel singer-songwriter and musician and 2008 Canadian Idol finalist
- Johnny Reid - Country musician and singer-songwriter
- Lloyd Robertson - CTV National News anchor
- Stephen Schnetzer - Soap actor, Another World
- Amy Sky - Canadian singer-songwriter
- The Stampeders - Canadian rock trio
- George Stroumboulopoulos, former MuchMusic VJ, TV and radio talk show host, and podcaster
- Glen Suitor - TSN sportscaster and former Saskatchewan Roughrider
- Alan Thicke (1947 - 2016) - Actor and game show host
- Shari Ulrich - Canadian singer-songwriter
- Valdy - folk singer-songwriter
- The Wilkinsons - Canadian country music group
- Jim Witter - Singer-songwriter and musician
- Tom Wopat - Actor and singer
- Michelle Wright - Canadian country singer
- Glenn Yarbrough (1930 - 2016) - Folk singer, guitarist, member of the Limeliters

=== Saskatchewan ===
- Sheldon Bergstrom (1971 - 2023) - Singer and actor
- Brent Butt - Stand-up comedian, actor, creator of Corner Gas, grew up in Tisdale
- Kim Coates - Saskatoon born actor
- Darren Dutchyshen (1966 - 2024) - Canadian sportscaster, co-hosted the evening edition of SportsCentre on TSN
- Tom Jackson - Aboriginal singer, musician, and actor
- Colin James - Regina-born Canadian blues legend
- Brad Johner - Country singer-songwriter and musician
- Connie Kaldor - Singer-songwriter, musician, and children' author
- Chad Klinger - country music artist, grew up in Lashburn
- Melanie Laine - Saskatchewan country music artist
- Alvin Law - motivational speaker
- Tyler Lewis - 2006 Canadian Idol finalist
- Jess Moskaluke - Country music artist, grew up in Langenburg
- Andrea Menard - Actor, singer-songwriter, playwright
- Donny Parenteau - Singer-songwriter, musician, and multi-instrumentalist
- Kyle Riabko - Saskatoon guitarist and singer-songwriter
- Theresa Sokyrka - 2004 Canadian Idol runner up
- Streetheart - Canadian rock band
- Streetnix - A cappella group
- Pamela Wallin - Television personality and diplomat

== See also ==
- Kin Canada
- Hal Rogers
