= Love Happens Like That =

Single by Neal McCoy

from the album Be Good at It
- B-side: "Broken Record"
- Released: June 27, 1998
- Genre: Country
- Length: 2:41
- Label: Atlantic
- Songwriter(s): Aaron Barker; Ron Harbin; Anthony L. Smith
- Producer(s): Kyle Lehning

Neal McCoy singles chronology
"Party On" (1998)	"Love Happens Like That" (1998)	"I Was" (1999)

"Love Happens Like That" is a song recorded by American country music artist Neal McCoy. It was released in June 1998 as the third single from the album Be Good at It. The song reached #29 on the Billboard Hot Country Singles & Tracks chart. The song was written by Aaron Barker, Ron Harbin and Anthony L. Smith.

== Critical reception ==
A review in Billboard noted that the song had a light and breezy summertime feel that should find a comfortable home a country radio. It also noted that producer Kyle Lehning's deft production touch provides the framework for McCoy to shine.

== Chart performance ==
Chart (1998)	Peak position
US Hot Country Songs (Billboard)	29
Canadian RPM Country Tracks	31
