= Mickey Denton =

American singer

Mickey Denton (born Gasper Badalamenti in Detroit on August 6, 1942) is an American blue eyed 60's soul singer and guitarist. He began performing in the early 1960s with the likes of Del Shannon and Johnny and the Hurricanes, but failed to find chart success. He was a frequent performer on the Las Vegas Strip in the 1970s and often performed with a group called "The Casinos". He later formed an electronic synthesizer based band called "The New York Express". The group recorded their first album in 1981, produced by Ron Gaines at Chene Records.

One of Denton's best known songs is "Now You Can't Give Them Away". He also recorded "Tell Her", a song by fellow Detroiter Jamie Coe in the early 1960s.
