= That's Life (Neal McCoy album) =

Studio album by Neal McCoy
- Released: August 23, 2005
- Genre: Country
- Label: 903 Music
- Producer: Eric Silver

Neal McCoy chronology
24-7-365 (2000)	That's Life (2005)	XII (2012)

Professional ratings
Review scores
Source	Rating
Allmusic	?
Country Standard Time	(mixed)

That's Life is the ninth studio album by American country music artist Neal McCoy. It was released on August 23, 2005 on his own 903 Music label. Three singles were released from this album: "Billy's Got His Beer Goggles On", the first of these three, reached #10 on the Hot Country Songs charts in 2005, becoming McCoy's first Top Ten hit since "The Shake" in 1997. "The Last of a Dying Breed" peaked at #35, while "Tail on the Tailgate" failed to chart. Also included here is a live rendition of "Hillbilly Rap", the original version of which was an album cut from his 1996 self-titled album.

== Track listing ==
1. "Got Mud" (Monty Criswell, Jerrod Niemann) – 2:51
2. "Intro (General Tommy Franks)" – 0:45
  - spoken-word intro to "The Last of a Dying Breed", recited by Tommy Franks
3. "The Last of a Dying Breed" (Tommy Connors, Don Rollins, D. Vincent Williams) – 3:02
4. "That's Life" (Eric Silver, Matt Rollings) – 4:10
5. "Billy's Got His Beer Goggles On" (Philip White, Michael Mobley) – 3:38
6. "That's a Picture" (Bryan Simpson, Wade Kirby, Ashley Gorley) – 3:04
7. "You Let Me Be the Hero" (Silver, Rodney Clawson) – 3:46
8. "Tail on the Tailgate" (Brian Gene White, Tania Hancheroff, Clawson) – 4:00
9. "Tails I Lose" (Silver, Neal McCoy) – 3:46
10. "Jessie" (Jeremy Campbell, McCoy, Donny Hackett) – 3:52
11. "You're My Jamaica" (Kent Robbins) – 3:45
  - featuring Charley Pride
12. "Head South" (Darrell Scott) – 2:40
13. "Hillbilly Rap (Live)" (Lord Burgess, Bernard Edwards, Nile Rodgers, William Attaway, Paul Henning) – 6:31

A special CD-ROM track of "Billy's Got His Beer Goggles On" is also available on some presses of the album.

== Personnel ==
- David Angell - violin
- Steve Auburn - fiddle, background vocals
- Bekka Bramlett - background vocals
- Bob Britt - electric guitar
- Matt Britton - steel drums
- Chuck Butler - drum programming
- David Davidson - violin
- Scott Dixon - electric guitar
- Tommy Franks - introduction on track 2
- Sonny Garrish - steel guitar, lap steel guitar
- Wes Hightower - background vocals
- Mark Hill - bass guitar
- Wayne Killius - drums, percussion
- Anthony LaMarchina - cello
- Troy Lancaster - electric guitar
- Brent Mason - electric guitar
- Lynn Massey - drums, background vocals
- Neal McCoy - lead vocals
- Shane McDaniel - steel guitar, background vocals
- Jerry McPherson - electric guitar
- Lorne O'Neil - bass guitar, background vocals
- Charley Pride - vocals on "You're My Jamaica"
- Michael Rhodes - bass guitar
- Jeffrey Roach - Hammond organ, synthesizer
- Tom Roady - percussion
- Lou Rodriguez - acoustic guitar, background vocals
- Mike Rojas - Hammond organ, piano, synthesizer
- Matt Rollings - piano
- Eric Silver - banjo, fiddle, acoustic guitar, baritone guitar, electric guitar, mandolin, shaker, background vocals, wah wah guitar
- Pamela Sixfin - violin
- Todd Stewart - keyboards
- Bryan White - background vocals
- Kristen Wilkinson - string arrangements, viola
- Andrea Zonn - background vocals

== Chart performance ==
Chart (2005)	Peak position
U.S. Billboard Top Country Albums	8
U.S. Billboard 200	32
U.S. Billboard Independent Albums	3
