= Billy's Got His Beer Goggles On =

Single by Neal McCoy

from the album That's Life
- Released: March 21, 2005
- Recorded: January 2005
- Genre: Country
- Length: 3:38
- Label: 903 Music
- Songwriters: Philip White; Michael Mobley
- Producer: Eric Silver

Neal McCoy singles chronology
"The Luckiest Man in the World" (2002)	"Billy's Got His Beer Goggles On" (2005)	"The Last of a Dying Breed" (2006)

"Billy's Got His Beer Goggles On" is a song written by Philip White and Michael Mobley, and recorded by American country music artist Neal McCoy. It was released in March 2005 as the lead-off single to his album That's Life. It was McCoy's first release from his vanity label 903 Music. The song reached number 10 on Hot Country Songs in 2005, becoming McCoy's first Top 10 single since "The Shake" in 1997, and his last Top 10 to date.

== Content ==
The song describes a man who, after his girlfriend leaves him, becomes so intoxicated that he is said to be wearing beer goggles, a term used to indicate the lack of sexual inhibition when one is drunk. Everything (the girls, barfights, etc.) looks good to him.

== Music video ==
The music video was directed by Buddy Swell. It features actor and comedian Rob Schneider and zookeeper Jack Hanna.

== Chart performance ==
"Billy's Got His Beer Goggles On" debuted at number 60 on the U.S. Billboard Hot Country Singles & Tracks for the week of April 16, 2005.

Chart (2005)	Peak position
US Hot Country Songs (Billboard)	10
US Billboard Hot 100	75

=== Year-end charts ===
Chart (2005)	Position
US Country Songs (Billboard)	50
