= Every Man for Himself (song) =

2000 song performed by Neal McCoy

Single by Neal McCoy

from the album 24-7-365
- B-side: "The Key to Your Heart"
- Released: September 2, 2000
- Genre: Country
- Length: 3:53
- Songwriter(s): Tim Johnson, Mark Elliott
- Producer(s): Ed Seay, John Hobbs

Neal McCoy singles chronology
"Forever Works for Me (Monday, Tuesday, Wednesday, Thursday)" (2000)	"Every Man for Himself" (2000)	"The Luckiest Man in the World" (2002)

"Every Man for Himself" is a song recorded by American country music artist Neal McCoy. It was released in September 2000 as the second single from the album 24-7-365. The song reached #37 on the Billboard Hot Country Singles & Tracks chart. The song was written by Tim Johnson and Mark Elliott.

== Content ==
The song is about a group of men who paid too much attention to careers and lost their families.

== Chart performance ==
Chart (2000)	Peak position
US Hot Country Songs (Billboard)	37
