= Going, Going, Gone (Bryan White song) =

Single by Neal McCoy

from the album Neal McCoy
- Released: September 28, 1996
- Genre: Country
- Length: 3:50
- Label: Atlantic
- Songwriters: Bob DiPiero, John Scott Sherrill, Steve Cropper
- Producer: Barry Beckett

Neal McCoy singles chronology
"Then You Can Tell Me Goodbye" (1996)	"Going, Going, Gone" (1996)	"That Woman of Mine" (1997)

"Going, Going, Gone" is a song written by Bob DiPiero, John Scott Sherrill, and Steve Cropper. It was first recorded by the American country music artist Bryan White on his 1994 first album, Bryan White.

It was covered by American country music artist Neal McCoy and released in September 1996 as the second single from his album Neal McCoy. The song reached number 35 on the Billboard Hot Country Singles & Tracks chart.

== Chart performance ==
Chart (1996)	Peak position
US Hot Country Songs (Billboard)	35
Canadian RPM Country Tracks	42
