= No Doubt About It (album) =

Studio album by Neal McCoy
- Released: February 8, 1994
- Recorded: 1993
- Studio: OmniSound Studio, Sound Stage Studios, Woodland Digital Studios, Nashville, TN
- Genre: Country
- Length: 35:55
- Label: Atlantic
- Producer: Barry Beckett

Neal McCoy chronology
| Where Forever Begins (1992) | No Doubt About It (1994) | You Gotta Love That! (1995) |

Singles from No Doubt About It
- 1. "No Doubt About It" Released: December 6, 1993; 2. "Wink" Released: April 11, 1994; 3. "The City Put the Country Back in Me" Released: July 18, 1994

No Doubt About It is the third studio album by American country music artist Neal McCoy. Released in 1994, it is considered his breakthrough album, and has been certified platinum in the United States. Both the album's title track and "Wink" reached the top of the Billboard Hot Country Singles & Tracks (now Hot Country Songs) charts, the latter holding its peak position for four weeks. The album's third single, "The City Put the Country Back in Me", was also a Top 5 hit.

== Critical reception ==
In New Country magazine, Brian Mansfield referred to the lyrics of other songs as "rang[ing] from the simple-minded to the genuinely embarrassing" and gave the album two stars out of five. He was more positive in his review for Allmusic, giving it four-and-a-half stars and saying that it "was the first to capture the rock-influenced sound of McCoy's stage show."

Alanna Nash of Entertainment Weekly gave the album a C− rating, criticizing the title track in particular: "If radio thinks this blander-than-generic ballad is the future of country, we might as well just move to the middle of the road right now."

== Track listing ==
| No. | Title | Writer(s) | Length |
|---|---|---|---|
| 1. | "No Doubt About It" | John Scott Sherrill; Steve Seskin | 3:48 |
| 2. | "The City Put the Country Back in Me" | Mike Geiger; Woody Mullis; Michael Huffman | 3:36 |
| 3. | "Why Now" | John Schweers; James Dean Hicks | 4:19 |
| 4. | "Heaven" | Jess Brown | 4:02 |
| 5. | "Wink" | Bob DiPiero; Tom Shapiro | 2:42 |
| 6. | "I Apologize" | Al Anderson; Mike Henderson | 3:50 |
| 7. | "Mudslide" | Sandy Ramos | 2:39 |
| 8. | "Why Not Tonight" | Donny Kees; Jimmy Jay; Richard Ross | 3:37 |
| 9. | "Small Up and Simple Down" | David Kent; Harley Campbell | 3:23 |
| 10. | "Something Moving in Me" | Rory Bourke; Mike Reid | 3:55 |
| Total length: | | | 35:55 |

== Personnel ==
- Eddie Bayers – drums, percussion
- Barry Beckett – keyboards
- Gary Burr – background vocals
- Paul Franklin – steel guitar
- Neal McCoy – lead vocals
- Phil Naish – keyboards
- Donny Parenteau – fiddle, mandolin
- Don Potter – acoustic guitar
- Michael Rhodes – bass guitar
- Brent Rowan – electric guitar
- Harry Stinson – background vocals
- Dennis Wilson – background vocals

== Charts ==
=== Weekly charts ===
| Chart (1994) | Peak position |
|---|---|
| Canadian Country Albums (RPM) | 1 |
| US Billboard 200 | 84 |
| US Top Country Albums (Billboard) | 13 |
| US Heatseekers Albums (Billboard) | 2 |

=== Year-end charts ===
| Chart (1994) | Position |
|---|---|
| US Top Country Albums (Billboard) | 37 |

=== Singles ===
| Year | Single | Peak positions | |
| Year | Single | US Country | CAN Country |
|---|---|---|---|
| 1993 | "No Doubt About It" | 1 | 1 |
| 1994 | "Wink" | 1 | 1 |
| 1994 | "The City Put the Country Back in Me" | 5 | 11 |
"—" denotes releases that did not chart
