= XII (Neal McCoy album) =

Studio album by Neal McCoy
- Released: March 6, 2012
- Genre: Country
- Label: Blaster
- Producer: Miranda Lambert; Blake Shelton; Brent Rowan

Neal McCoy chronology
That's Life (2005)	XII (2012)	Pride: A Tribute to Charley Pride (2013)

Singles from XII
- 1. "A-OK" Released: October 17, 2011; 2. "Shotgun Rider" Released: April 23, 2012

Professional ratings
Review scores
Source	Rating
Allmusic	3/5 stars
Roughstock	3.5/5 stars
Taste of Country	4/5 stars

XII is the tenth studio album by American country music singer Neal McCoy. Released on March 6, 2012, by Blaster Records, it is his first album of new material since That's Life in 2005. Blake Shelton and Miranda Lambert co-produced the album with Brent Rowan. The album includes the single "A-OK".

== Critical reception ==
Matt Bjorke of Roughstock gave the album three-and-a-half stars out of five, saying that it "finds him doing what he does best, performing nimble mainstream country music tunes as good as anything else on the marketplace." Rating it four stars out of five, Taste of Country writer Billy Dukes favorably compared McCoy's vocals to Shelton's. J. Poet of Allmusic rated it three stars out of five, saying that the album had "one great tune, two good ones, and a whole lot that get by on McCoy's powerful vocals".

== Track listing ==
No.	Title	Writer(s)	Length
1.	"A-OK"	Brett Eldredge; Luke Laird; Barry Dean	2:56
2.	"Real Good Feel Good"	Dallas Davidson; Jimmy Ritchey; Sam Hunt	4:05
3.	"Judge a Man by the Woman"	Dean; Don Poythress	3:58
4.	"Mouth"	Jamey Johnson; David Tolliver	3:15
5.	"Shotgun Rider"	Keith Anderson; Rhett Akins; Dallas Davidson; Ben Hayslip	3:00
6.	"That's You"	Clint Daniels; Neal McCoy; Jeff Hyde	3:24
7.	"Crazy Women"	Rivers Rutherford; George Teren	3:34
8.	"Lucky Enough"	McCoy; Hyde; Ryan Tyndell	3:33
9.	"Every Fire"	Cathy Majeski; John Scott Sherrill	3:39
10.	"That's Just How She Gets"	Shane Minor; Bart Butler; Dave Turnbull	2:56
11.	"Borderline Crazy"	Greg Barnhill; Kris Bergsnes; Jeremy Stover	3:16
12.	"Van Gogh"	Tom Douglas; Allen Shamblin	3:56
Total length:			41:42

== Personnel ==
- Perry Coleman – background vocals
- Eric Darken – percussion
- Scott Ducaj – trumpet
- Dan Dugmore – Dobro, electric guitar, steel guitar, lap steel guitar
- Lester Estelle Jr. – drums
- David Grissom – electric guitar
- Aubrey Haynie – fiddle
- Wes Hightower – background vocals
- John Barlow Jarvis – piano
- Kim Keyes – background vocals
- Miranda Lambert – background vocals
- Tim Lauer – organ, synthesizer, Wurlitzer
- Mac McAnally – acoustic guitar
- Neal McCoy – lead vocals, whistle
- Greg Morrow – drums, percussion
- Wendy Moten – background vocals
- Michael Rhodes – bass guitar
- Mike Rojas – piano
- Brent Rowan – bass guitar, acoustic guitar, electric guitar, piano, sitar
- Blake Shelton – acoustic guitar, background vocals
- Bryan Sutton – banjo, acoustic guitar, resonator guitar
- Glenn Worf – bass guitar

== Charts ==
Chart (2012)	Peak position
US Billboard Top Country Albums	58
