= They're Playin' Our Song =

Single by Neal McCoy

from the album You Gotta Love That
- Released: April 24, 1995
- Genre: Country
- Length: 3:22
- Label: Atlantic
- Songwriters: Bob DiPiero, John Jarrard, Mark D. Sanders
- Producer: Barry Beckett

Neal McCoy singles chronology
"For a Change" (1994)	"They're Playin' Our Song" (1995)	"If I Was a Drinkin' Man" (1995)

"They're Playin' Our Song" is a song written by Bob DiPiero, John Jarrard and Mark D. Sanders, and recorded by American country music singer Neal McCoy. It was released in April 1995 as the second single from his album You Gotta Love That. The song peaked at number 3 on the U.S. Hot Country Singles & Tracks (now Hot Country Songs) chart and at number 8 on the RPM Country Tracks in Canada.

== Music video ==
The music video was directed by John Lloyd Miller and premiered in May 1995.

== Chart performance ==
The song debuted at number 45 on the Hot Country Singles & Tracks chart dated May 6, 1995. It charted for 20 weeks on that chart, and peaked at number 3 on the chart dated July 1, 1995.

=== Charts ===
Chart (1995)	Peak position
Canada Country Singles (RPM)	8
US Hot Country Songs (Billboard)	3

=== Year-end charts ===
Chart (1995)	Position
US Country Songs (Billboard)	9
