= Goin' All Out =

Studio album by Eric Darius
- Released: June 24, 2008
- Genre: Smooth jazz
- Label: Blue Note Records
- Producer: Darren Rahn, Eric Darius

Eric Darius chronology
| Just Getting Started (2006) | Goin' All Out (2008) |

Goin' All Out is a smooth jazz album by saxophonist Eric Darius. Released on June 24, 2008, this album is Darius' fourth, but his first released through Blue Note Records. The album peaked at #9 on Billboard's Top Contemporary Jazz chart, staying on the chart for over 5 months. The album's single release, "Goin' All Out", peaked at #1 on Billboard's Smooth Jazz Songs chart during the week of October 25, 2008.

== Track listing ==
All songs written by Barkulis, Darius, Floyd, King, and Otano except where listed.

1. "Just Like That" – 3:34
2. "Because of You" – 4:30 (Eriksen, Hermansen, Smith)
3. "Just for the Moment" – 3:55 (Darius)
4. "Goin' All Out" – 4:11 (Darren Rahn, Darius)
5. "Be Without You" – 4:08 (Austin, Blige, Cox, Perry)
6. "Vibe with Me" – 4:10
7. "Feelin' da Rhythm" – 3:56
8. "Ain't No Doubt About It" – 4:23 (Darius, Rahn, Tedeschi)
9. "Unconditional" – 3:51
10. "Breathe" – 4:32 (Rahn, Darius)
