= Where Forever Begins (Neal McCoy album) =

Studio album by Neal McCoy
- Released: June 2, 1992
- Studio: Mesa Recording, The Reflections, Sound Stage Studios Nashville, Tn
- Genre: Country
- Length: 29:32
- Label: Atlantic
- Producer: James Stroud

Neal McCoy chronology
At This Moment (1990)	Where Forever Begins (1992)	No Doubt About It (1994)

Singles from Where Forever Begins
- 1. "Where Forever Begins" Released: April 1992; 2. "There Ain't Nothin' I Don't Like About You" Released: August 1992; 3. "Now I Pray for Rain" Released: January 1993

Where Forever Begins is the second studio album by American country music artist Neal McCoy. It was released in 1992 on the Atlantic label. The album's title track was McCoy's first Top 40 hit on the Billboard country music charts. "Now I Pray for Rain" and "There Ain't Nothin' I Don't Like About You" were also released as singles.

== Track listing ==
No.	Title	Writer(s)	Length
1.	"Now I Pray for Rain"	George Teren; Lee Satterfield	3:05
2.	"Palm of My Hand"	Gene Dobbins; Tim Mensy	3:01
3.	"The Wall"	Curtis Wright; Billy Spencer	2:45
4.	"The Day the Boys Leave the Girls Alone"	Randy Edwards Jr.; Jerry Michaels; Troy Seals	2:30
5.	"Where Forever Begins"	Trey Bruce; Thom McHugh	3:08
6.	"There Ain't Nothin' I Don't Like About You"	Mark Irwin; Katie Wallace	2:27
7.	"A Little at a Time"	Mensy; Gary Harrison	3:28
8.	"Big Doggin' Around"	Mike Henderson; Wally Wilson	2:25
9.	"Where Do Daddies Go"	Steve Seskin; Larry Bastian	2:51
10.	"Mountains on the Moon"	Karen Staley; Jack White	3:52
Total length:			29:32

== Personnel ==
- Mark Casstevens - acoustic guitar, mandolin
- Larry Franklin - fiddle
- Sonny Garrish - Dobro, steel guitar
- Steve Gibson - electric guitar
- Jana King - background vocals
- Chris Leuzinger - electric guitar
- Brent Mason - acoustic guitar, electric guitar
- Lynn Massey - drums, percussion
- Randy McCormick - piano, synthesizer
- Neal McCoy - lead vocals, background vocals
- Roger McVay - bass guitar
- Dee Murray - bass guitar
- Lorne O'Neil - bass guitar, background vocals
- Donny Parenteau - fiddle, background vocals
- Gary Prim - piano, synthesizer
- Steve Segler - piano, synthesizer, background vocals
- Glenn Shankle - acoustic guitar, background vocals
- Milton Sledge - drums
- Joe Spivey - fiddle
- James Stroud - drums
- Glenn Worf - bass guitar
- Curtis Young - background vocals

== Chart performance ==
Chart (1992)	Peak position
U.S. Billboard Top Country Albums	58
U.S. Billboard Top Heatseekers	30
Canadian RPM Country Albums	22

=== Singles ===
Year	Single	Peak positions	
Year	Single	US Country	CAN Country
1992	"Where Forever Begins"	40	37
1992	"There Ain't Nothin' I Don't Like About You"	57	—
1993	"Now I Pray for Rain"	26	35
"—" denotes releases that did not chart
