= C.A. Quintet =

- Origin: Minneapolis–Saint Paul, Minnesota, United States
- Genres: Psychedelic rock, acid rock
- Years active: 1966–1971
- Labels: Candyfloss Records; Sundazed
- Past members: Ken Erwin; Doug Reynolds; Tom Pohling; Rick Patrin; Jim Erwin; Donnie Chapin; Rick Johnson; Paul Samuels; Toni Crockett
- Website: caquintet.com/index.html

The C.A. Quintet, from Minnesota, USA, was a psychedelic rock band active in the late 1960s. They did not gain national attention during their heyday (all their records were locally produced in Minneapolis and none had national distribution).

C.A. Quintet’s first three singles, as well as their debut album, have become very rare and expensive collectors items. The band was made up of Doug Reynolds (keyboards, vocals), Tom Pohling (guitar), Ken Erwin (trumpet), Jimmy Erwin (bass), Rick Patron (drums).

The band’s debut album, Trip Thru’ Hell, was released in 1969 on the Candy Floss label. Ken Erwin was the leader of C.A. Quintet, and he produced the album himself. The album has been reissued several times, all without the band’s permission. Their album sold out the first day it was in the stores but their record company printed no more copies as they were miss-managed and under-capitalized. Their only LP released during the band's existence, Trip Thru Hell, sold fewer than 1000 copies and was virtually unheard of outside of their home town. Despite its minuscule initial distribution, the record slowly gained worldwide popularity over the next twenty years among fans, collectors and musicians. Due to increasing demand, it was re-released in the early 1980s on poor quality unauthorized copies which were illegally sold by several bootleg companies. Then the original album was released on an authorized CD in 1994 on the Sundazed record label which included their singles and some unreleased material. A live album was released in 1986 of their last performance as a group, re-released in 2006 with additional material .… An original 1969 Candy Floss release of this album sold in 2014 for $5655. Several Live albums were released from a recording of their last performance in 1971. In September 2019 they started own Artist Channel on YouTube https://www.youtube.com/c/CAQuintet and most of their music including the Trip Thru Hell album can be found on most streaming sites as their music is now known all over the world. In April 2023 their Trip Thru Hell album was re-leased again as well as a CD by Sundazed Music and can be found online as well as most music retail outlets.

== Discography ==
=== Albums ===
- Trip Thru Hell (LP, 1969)
- Live 1971 (LP, 1984)
- Last trip at Lake Pepin (LP, 2006)
- In 2026 the band released an official remaster of Trip Thru Hell, remastered by original member Ken Erwin from the source materials and issued as a limited 180-gram vinyl edition.

==== Trip Thru Hell ====
Trip Thru Hell was locally produced in Minneapolis with less than 500 copies sold in its original pressing on the Candy Floss label. Two unauthorized versions have been reissued, an LP on the British Psycho (UNAUTHORIZED COPIES) label in 1983 with a stereo channel missing, and a (illegal) 1993 CD by the French Eva label. Both these releases are missing one track. The album was finally legally reissued by Sundazed Music in both CD (1995) and 2xLP (1996) formats, with additional tracks and extensive liner notes.

Track listing

1. Trip Thru Hell, Pt. 1 (Erwin) - 9:09
2. Colorado Mourning (Erwin)- 2:31
3. Cold Spider - (Erwin) O4:41
4. Underground Music (Erwin) - 4:43
5. Sleepy Hollow Lane (Erwin) - 2:04
6. Smooth As Silk (Erwin) - 2:12
7. Trip Thru Hell, (Erwin) Pt. 2 - 3:40
8. Dr. Of Philosophy (Erwin) - 2:09
9. Blow To My Soul (Sandler) - 1:59
10. Ain't No Doubt About it (Erwin) - 2:31
11. Mickey's Monkey (Dozier, Holland, Holland) - 2:26
12. I Put A Spell On You (Hawkins) - 2:47
13. I Shot The King (Erwin)- 2:22
14. Fortune Teller's Lie (Erwin) - 2:09
15. Sadie Lavone - (Erwin) 2:49
16. Bury Me In A Marijuana Field (Erwin) - 2:11
17. Colorado Mourning (Alternate Version) (Erwin) - 2:13
18. Underground Music (Alternate Version) (Erwin)- 2:08
19. Smooth As Silk (Alternate Version) (Erwin) - 3:20

All titles by Ken Erwin except where indicated.

=== Singles ===
- Mickey's Monkey/I Want You To Love Me Girl (1967)
- Smooth As Silk/Dr. Of Philosophy (1968)
