= Then You Can Tell Me Goodbye =

Song written by John D. Loudermilk

Single by The Casinos

from the album Then You Can Tell Me Goodbye
- B-side: "I Still Love You"
- Released: December 1966
- Genre: Doo-wop
- Length: 3:09
- Label: Fraternity 977
- Songwriter: John D. Loudermilk
- Producer: Gene Hughes

The Casinos singles chronology
"Then You Can Tell Me Goodbye" (1966)	"Bye Bye Love" (1967)

"Then You Can Tell Me Goodbye" is a song written by John D. Loudermilk. It was first released in 1962 by Don Cherry, as a country song and again as a doo-wop in 1967 by the group The Casinos on its album of the same name, and was a number 6 pop hit that year. The song has since been covered by Eddy Arnold, whose version was a number 1 country hit in 1968, and by Neal McCoy, whose version became a Top 5 country hit in 1996.

== Content ==
The song was written by Loudermilk, who also recorded it for his 1967 album, Suburban Attitudes in Country Verse. It is played as a slow 12/8 shuffle, its lyric addressing a female lover at the beginning of a relationship.

== The Casinos version ==
The Casinos version of "Then You Can Tell Me Goodbye" - which became the title track of the group's debut album - reached number 6 on the U.S. Billboard Hot 100 in March 1967, becoming the group's only Top 40 hit. Casinos' frontman Gene Hughes would recall that he'd heard the 1964 Johnny Nash recording of "Then You Can Tell Me Goodbye" on the John R. Show broadcast on WLAC out of Nashville and that the Casinos had been performing it in their club act for several years (Gene Hughes quote:)"So, while we were in the studio in the King Studios in Cincinnati, cutting this instrumental [King Curtis’] ‘Soul Serenade’ for a disk jockey, we used the time to [also] cut ‘Then You Can Tell Me'." Musicians on the track included Bob Armstrong on organ, Mickey Denton on guitar, Ray White on bass, and Bob Smith on drums. The track also featured a brass section of trumpets and trombones. It was also a number 28 pop hit in the United Kingdom.

=== Chart history ===
Chart (1967)	Peak position
US Billboard Hot 100	6
UK Singles Chart	28
Canadian Singles Chart	4

== Eddy Arnold version ==
"Then You Can Tell Me Goodbye"

Single by Eddy Arnold

from the album Walkin' in Love Land
- B-side: "Apples, Raisins and Roses"
- Released: August 31, 1968
- Genre: Country
- Length: 2:47
- Label: RCA
- Songwriter: John D. Loudermilk
- Producer: Chet Atkins

Eddy Arnold singles chronology
"It's Over" (1968)	"Then You Can Tell Me Goodbye" (1968)	"They Don't Make Love Like They Used To" (1968)

In 1968, country music artist Eddy Arnold covered "Then You Can Tell Me Goodbye" on his album Walkin' in Love Land. Arnold has said that he was inspired to record the song after hearing Loudermilk perform it. Arnold's rendition was a Number One hit on both the U.S. Billboard Hot Country Singles (now Hot Country Songs) charts and RPM Country Tracks charts, as well as reaching number 84 on the U.S. pop charts.

=== Chart history ===
Chart (1968)	Peak position
U.S. Billboard Hot Country Singles	1
US Billboard Hot 100	84
U.S. Billboard Easy Listening	6
Canadian RPM Country Tracks	1
Canadian RPM Top Singles	57

== Neal McCoy version ==
"Then You Can Tell Me Goodbye"

Single by Neal McCoy

from the album Neal McCoy
- Released: May 18, 1996
- Genre: Country
- Length: 3:17
- Label: Atlantic
- Songwriter: John D. Loudermilk
- Producer: Barry Beckett

Neal McCoy singles chronology
"You Gotta Love That" (1996)	"Then You Can Tell Me Goodbye" (1996)	"Going, Going, Gone" (1996)

Neal McCoy covered the song in 1996 on his self-titled album. Released in May of that year as that album's lead-off single, it reached number 4 on the U.S. Billboard country charts and number 7 on the Canadian RPM country charts, as well as number 7 on the Bubbling Under Hot 100. McCoy's cover was the seventh Top Ten country hit of his career.

=== Chart history ===
Chart (1996)	Peak position
Canada Country Singles (RPM)	7
US Bubbling Under Hot 100 (Billboard)	107
US Hot Country Songs (Billboard)	4

=== Year-end charts ===
Chart (1996)	Position
Canada Country Tracks (RPM)	72
US Country Songs (Billboard)	44

== Other versions ==
Johnny Tillotson released a version in 1964 on his album The Tillotson Touch (May / 1964)

Andy Williams released a version in 1967 on his album, Born Free.

James Brown released a version in 1969 on his album, Say It Loud – I'm Black and I'm Proud.

Bettye Swann recorded the song in 1969. This version was used for the ending credits of the second season of The End of the F***ing World and in Episode 5 of Funny Woman.

Pat Kelly, sound engineer and vocalist with The Techniques released a Reggae version of the tune in 1969 to great acclaim, with Bunny Lee on production duties.

Freddy Fender recorded the song in 1974 on his album, Before the Next Teardrop Falls.

Perry Como recorded a version on his 1975 album, Just Out of Reach.

Glen Campbell recorded the song as a medley with Hamilton, Joe Frank & Reynolds' "Don't Pull Your Love". This song was a number 27 pop hit and went to number 1 on the Easy Listening chart in 1976. The medley also peaked at number 4 on the country chart.

Toby Beau included it in their second album More Than a Love Song in 1979. It reached 57 on the Billboard Hot 100 charts and 7 on the Adult Contemporary list.

The 5th Dimension recorded the song in 1973, but it was not released until 2004 as a bonus track on their The Ultimate 5th Dimension album.

Joss Stone recorded a version of the song for her 2012 album The Soul Sessions Vol. II.

Johnny Nash recorded a version in 1964 for Argo Records.

Frankie Valli recorded a cover version of this song for his 2007 solo album of covers, Romancing The 60's.

Rosanne Cash recorded a live version at the Franklin Theatre in Franklin, Tennessee on March 24, 2016. This version appears on the Vector Recordings album A Tribute to John D. Loudermilk.

The Tallest Man on Earth recorded a version for his 2022 album of covers, Too Late for Edelweiss.

The Manhattans released a version on their 1978 Columbia Records album, There's No Good in Goodbye.

Barry Darnell released a version on his 2018 album "Postcards From Tupelo" on Backyard Records.

== See also ==
- List of 1960s one-hit wonders in the United States
- List of number-one adult contemporary singles of 1976 (U.S.)
