= For a Change =

Single by Neal McCoy

from the album You Gotta Love That
- B-side: "You're Backin' Up"
- Released: December 19, 1994
- Genre: Country
- Length: 3:22
- Label: Atlantic
- Songwriters: John Scott Sherrill; Steve Seskin
- Producer: Barry Beckett

Neal McCoy singles chronology
| "The City Put the Country Back in Me" (1994) | "For a Change" (1994) | "They're Playin' Our Song" (1995) |

"For a Change" is a song written by John Scott Sherrill and Steve Seskin, and recorded by American country music artist Neal McCoy. It was released in December 1994 as the first single from his album You Gotta Love That. The song reached number 3 on the U.S. Billboard Hot Country Singles & Tracks chart and peaked at number 8 on the RPM Country Tracks in Canada.

== Music video ==
The music video was directed by Marc Ball and premiered in December 1994.

== Chart performance ==
"For a Change" debuted at number 73 on the U.S. Billboard Hot Country Singles & Tracks for the week of December 17, 1994.

| Chart (1994–1995) | Peak position |
|---|---|
| Canada Country Singles (RPM) | 8 |
| US Bubbling Under Hot 100 (Billboard) | 8 |
| US Hot Country Songs (Billboard) | 3 |

=== Year-end charts ===
| Chart (1995) | Position |
|---|---|
| Canada Country Tracks (RPM) | 73 |
| US Country Songs (Billboard) | 25 |

== Parodies ==
- American country music parody artist Cledus T. Judd released a parody of "For a Change" titled "The Change" on his 1996 album I Stoled This Record.
