= You Gotta Love That (song) =

1996 single by Neal McCoy

Single by Neal McCoy

from the album You Gotta Love That
- B-side: "If I Was a Drinkin' Man"
- Released: January 1, 1996
- Genre: Country
- Length: 2:36
- Label: Atlantic
- Songwriters: Jess Brown; Brett Jones
- Producer: Barry Beckett

Neal McCoy singles chronology
"If I Was a Drinkin' Man" (1995)	"You Gotta Love That" (1996)	"Then You Can Tell Me Goodbye" (1996)

"You Gotta Love That" is a song written by Jess Brown and Brett Jones, and recorded by American country music artist Neal McCoy. It was released in January 1996 as the fourth single from his album You Gotta Love That. The song reached number 3 on the Billboard Hot Country Singles & Tracks chart in April 1996.

== Chart performance ==
"You Gotta Love That" debuted at number 64 on the U.S. Billboard Hot Country Singles & Tracks for the week of January 6, 1996.

Chart (1996)	Peak position
Canada Country Singles (RPM)	13
US Hot Country Songs (Billboard)	3

=== Year-end charts ===
Chart (1996)	Position
US Country Songs (Billboard)	25
