= The City Put the Country Back in Me =

Single by Neal McCoy

from the album No Doubt About It
- B-side: "Why Not Tonight"
- Released: July 18, 1994
- Genre: Country
- Length: 3:36
- Label: Atlantic
- Songwriters: Mike Geiger; Woody Mullis; Michael Huffman
- Producer: Barry Beckett

Neal McCoy singles chronology
"Wink" (1994)	"The City Put the Country Back in Me" (1994)	"For a Change" (1994)

"The City Put the Country Back in Me" is a song written by Mike Geiger, Woody Mullis and Michael Huffman, and recorded by American country music artist Neal McCoy. It was released in July 1994 as the third single from his album No Doubt About It. The song reached number 5 on the U.S. Billboard Hot Country Singles & Tracks chart and number 11 on the RPM Country Tracks chart in Canada.

== Critical reception ==
Deborah Evans Price, of Billboard magazine reviewed the song, calling it a "lightweight effort, a sassy brassy tale of a lad who finds the best of country life in a city honky-tonk."

== Music video ==
The music video was directed by Martin Kahan and premiered in late 1994. It was filmed in New York City and New Jersey and features a prominent display of the former World Trade Center Towers.

== Chart performance ==
Chart (1994)	Peak position
Canada Country Singles (RPM)	11
US Hot Country Songs (Billboard)	5

=== Year-end charts ===
Chart (1994)	Position
US Country Songs (Billboard)	53
