= This Time I've Hurt Her More Than She Loves Me =

Single by Conway Twitty

from the album This Time I've Hurt Her More
- B-side: "She Did It Did I Didn't"
- Released: October 1975
- Recorded: July 10, 1975
- Studio: Bradley's Barn, Mount Juliet, Tennessee
- Genre: Country
- Length: 2:28
- Label: MCA
- Songwriter(s): Earl Thomas Conley; Mary Larkin
- Producer(s): Owen Bradley

Conway Twitty singles chronology
"Don't Cry Joni" (1975)	"This Time I've Hurt Her More Than She Loves Me" (1975)	"After All the Good Is Gone" (1976)

"This Time I've Hurt Her More Than She Loves Me" is a song written by Earl Thomas Conley and Mary Larkin and recorded by American country music artist Conway Twitty. It was released in October 1975 as the first single from the album This Time I've Hurt Her More. The song was Twitty's fifteenth number one country single as a solo artist. The single stayed at number one for a single week and spent a total of ten weeks on the country chart.

== Personnel ==
- Conway Twitty — vocals
- Carol Lee Cooper, L.E. White, Joe E. Lewis, The Nashville Sounds — vocals
- Harold Bradley — 6-string electric bass guitar
- Ray Edenton — acoustic guitar
- Johnny Gimble — fiddle
- John Hughey — steel guitar
- Tommy Markham — drums
- Grady Martin — electric guitar
- Bob Moore — bass
- Hargus "Pig" Robbins — piano

== Cover versions ==
- Conley recorded his own version of the song on his 1981 album Fire and Smoke.
- In 1991, Neal McCoy took a cover version to #50 on the country charts.

== Charts ==
=== Conway Twitty ===
Chart (1975–1976)	Peak position
US Hot Country Songs (Billboard)	1
Canadian RPM Country Tracks	1

=== Year-end charts ===
Chart (1976)	Position
US Hot Country Songs (Billboard)	27

=== Neal McCoy ===
Chart (1991)	Peak position
US Hot Country Songs (Billboard)	50
