= If I Was a Drinkin' Man =

Single by Neal McCoy

from the album You Gotta Love That
- Released: August 12, 1995
- Genre: Country
- Length: 3:18
- Label: Atlantic
- Songwriters: Byron Hill, J.B. Rudd
- Producer: Barry Beckett

Neal McCoy singles chronology
"They're Playin' Our Song" (1995)	"If I Was a Drinkin' Man" (1995)	"You Gotta Love That" (1996)

"If I Was a Drinkin' Man" is a song written by Byron Hill and J.B. Rudd, and recorded by American country music artist Neal McCoy. It was released in August 1995 as the third single from the album You Gotta Love That. The song reached #16 on the Billboard Hot Country Singles & Tracks chart.

== Critical reception ==
Deborah Evans Price of Billboard gave the song a positive review, saying that it was a "thoughtful ballad" and that "McCoy has a warmth to his voice".

== Chart performance ==
Chart (1995)	Peak position
Canada Country Singles (RPM)	16
US Hot Country Songs (Billboard)	16
