= 24-7-365 (Neal McCoy album) =

Studio album by Neal McCoy
- Released: August 22, 2000
- Genre: Country
- Label: Giant
- Producer: Ed Seay; John Hobbs

Neal McCoy chronology
The Life of the Party (1999)	24-7-365 (2000)	That's Life (2005)

Professional ratings
Review scores
Source	Rating
AllMusic	2/5 stars
Country Standard Time	mixed

24-7-365 is the eighth studio album by American country music artist Neal McCoy. It is also his only album for Giant Records following the closure of his previous label, Atlantic Records. Singles from this album include "Forever Works for Me" (re-titled "Forever Works for Me (Monday, Tuesday, Wednesday, Thursday)" partway through its chart run), "Every Man for Himself", and "Beatin' It In", which all charted on the Hot Country Songs charts in 2000.

== Track listing ==
Writers per liner notes.

No.	Title	Writer(s)	Length
1.	"Count on Me"	Michael Lunn, Michael Noble	3:28
2.	"Forever Works for Me (Monday, Tuesday, Wednesday, Thursday)"	Steve Bogard, Rick Giles	3:25
3.	"My Life Began with You"	Don Pfrimmer, Marc Beeson	3:20
4.	"What Would Love Say"	Allen Shamblin, Chuck Jones	3:31
5.	"Beatin' It In"	Brett Beavers, Kelly Garrett	3:45
6.	"Every Man for Himself"	Mark Elliott, Tim Johnson	3:53
7.	"Disconnected"	Beavers, Garrett	3:01
8.	"A Love That Strong"	Jeffrey Steele, Reed Nielsen	3:42
9.	"24-7-365"	Donnie Fritts, Scott Boyer, N.C. Thurman	3:25
10.	"The Key to Your Heart"	John Hobbs, Jeff Wood	3:52

== Charts ==
Chart (2000)	Peak position
US Top Country Albums (Billboard)	28
