= Wink (song) =

Single by Neal McCoy

from the album No Doubt About It
- Released: April 11, 1994
- Genre: Country
- Length: 2:42
- Label: Atlantic
- Songwriters: Bob DiPiero; Tom Shapiro
- Producer: Barry Beckett

Neal McCoy singles chronology
"No Doubt About It" (1993)	"Wink" (1994)	"The City Put the Country Back in Me" (1994)

"Wink" is a song written by Bob DiPiero and Tom Shapiro, and recorded by American country music singer Neal McCoy. It was released in April 1994 as the second single from his album No Doubt About It. Also the second consecutive Number One from that album, "Wink" spent four weeks at the top of the Billboard Hot Country Singles & Tracks (now Hot Country Songs) chart in June and July of that year. In 1996, the song received the Robert J. Burton award from Broadcast Music Incorporated for being the most-performed country song of the year.

In 2022, McCoy was a featured artist for the song “That Drink” by George Birge. The song was a parody of the original by paying tribute to 90’s country. McCoy closes out in the song by singing a part in the original song.

== Content ==
It is an up-tempo song in which the narrator states that, no matter how he is feeling on a particular day, he feels better once his lover winks at him.

== Music video ==
The music video was directed by Martin Kahan and premiered in mid-1994. It shows McCoy performing the song at an event, as well as trying to get his lover to wink, which she refuses.

== Chart positions ==
"Wink" debuted at number 59 on the U.S. Billboard Hot Country Singles & Tracks for the week of April 23, 1994.

Chart (1994)	Peak position
Canada Country Singles (RPM)	1
US Billboard Hot 100	91
US Hot Country Songs (Billboard)	1

=== Year-end charts ===
Chart (1994)	Position
Canada Country Tracks (RPM)	2
US Country Songs (Billboard)	2
