= The Casinos =

American doo-wop music group

- Origin: Cincinnati, Ohio, United States
- Genres: Doo-wop
- Label: Fraternity
- Past members: Gene Hughes; Bob Armstrong; Ray White; Pete Bolton; Mickey Denton; Ken Brady; Bob Mohney; Herb (Herbie) Seitzer (toured with the group, playing organ, after the recording)

The Casinos was a nine-member doo-wop group from Cincinnati, Ohio, led by Gene Hughes and which included Bob Armstrong, Ray White, Mickey Denton, and Pete Bolton. Ken Brady performed with the group, taking over for Hughes from 1962 to 1965 as lead singer. Pete Bolton was replaced at the time by Jerry Baker. Brady left the group to perform as a solo artist and Hughes returned, at which time the Casinos became a nine-piece group. They are best known for their John D. Loudermilk-penned song "Then You Can Tell Me Goodbye", which hit No. 6 on the Billboard Hot 100 chart in 1967, well after the end of the doo-wop era. The Casinos were playing in a Cincinnati club where WSAI disc jockey Tom Dooley liked to visit. Dooley had a song he wanted to record but needed a band to provide the music. The Casinos had been getting great reaction to "Then You Can Tell Me Goodbye" at the club and wanted to record it. Dooley offered to pay for studio time at Cincinnati's King Records Studio for the group to record their song if they would back up Dooley on his song. While Dooley's song did not see success beyond WSAI, the Casinos' tune quickly became a national hit.

The group was based around Hughes and his brothers Glenn and Norman, and they signed a deal with Fraternity Records. "Then You Can Tell Me Goodbye" was their first single. The track reached No. 28 in the UK Singles Chart in March 1967. They tried to follow it up with a Don Everly-penned song, "It's All Over", but that only hit U.S. No. 65. They would have one charting album, which had the same name as their debut single, reaching No. 187 on the Billboard Top LPs.

After his time with the Casinos was over, Hughes became a country music promoter. He died on February 3, 2004, at the age of 67, from complications following a car accident.

Thomas Robert "Bob" Armstrong Jr. led the installation of the lights on multiple suspension bridges including the John A. Roebling Suspension Bridge in Cincinnati, Ohio, and the Memphis & Arkansas Bridge in Memphis, Tennessee. He also worked as the business manager of the St. Bernadette Church in Amelia, Ohio, and continued playing with the Casinos until his death from cancer on December 27, 2011, at the age of 67. Ken Brady then returned to the Casinos as their lead singer and still performs nationwide.
