= The Shake (Neal McCoy song) =

Single by Neal McCoy

from the album Greatest Hits
- Released: May 12, 1997
- Genre: Country
- Length: 3:33
- Label: Atlantic
- Songwriters: Jon McElroy; Butch Carr
- Producer: Kyle Lehning

Neal McCoy singles chronology
"That Woman of Mine" (1997)	"The Shake" (1997)	"If You Can't Be Good (Be Good at It)" (1997)

"The Shake" is a song written by Jon McElroy and Butch Carr, and recorded by American country music artist Neal McCoy. It was released May 1997 as the only single from McCoy's Greatest Hits compilation album. The song reached number 5 on the Billboard Hot Country Singles & Tracks chart in October 1997. It peaked at number 7 on the Canadian RPM Country Tracks.

== Music video ==
The music video was directed by Chris Rogers, and premiered on CMT on June 16, 1997. In the video, a teenage boy walks in, and Neal's mom, played as a homage to Leave It to Beaver. The song starts as he and his band are performing in the garage. The video ends with the mother starting to dance.

== Critical reception ==
Robert Loy of Country Standard Time described the song negatively, saying that it was "a puerile and sexist hymn to feminine derriere movement[…]And that's good because the only thing saving lyrics like 'Shake it real funky/Shake it real low/Shake it till you just can't shake it no more' from being offensive is that they're so incredibly stupid."

== Chart performance ==
"The Shake" debuted at number 67 on the U.S. Billboard Hot Country Singles & Tracks for the week of May 24, 1997.

Chart (1997)	Peak position
Canada Country Singles (RPM)	7
US Hot Country Songs (Billboard)	5

=== Year-end charts ===
Chart (1997)	Position
Canada Country Tracks (RPM)	96
US Country Songs (Billboard)	57
