= No Doubt About It (Neal McCoy song) =

Single by Neal McCoy

from the album No Doubt About It
- Released: December 6, 1993
- Genre: Country
- Length: 3:48
- Label: Atlantic
- Songwriters: John Scott Sherrill; Steve Seskin
- Producer: Barry Beckett

Neal McCoy singles chronology
"Now I Pray for Rain" (1993)	"No Doubt About It" (1993)	"Wink" (1994)

"No Doubt About It" is a song written by John Scott Sherrill and Steve Seskin, and recorded by American country music artist Neal McCoy. It was released in December 1993 as the first single and title track from his album No Doubt About It. McCoy's rendition was his breakthrough single release, becoming his first Number One country hit in early 1994.

== Content ==
The song is a ballad in which the male narrator states that he and his lover were "meant to be together, no doubt about it."

== Critical reception ==
Alanna Nash of Entertainment Weekly, in her review of No Doubt About It, called the song a "blander-than-generic ballad".

== Music video ==
The music video was directed by Martin Kahan and premiered in early 1994. It features McCoy and a woman building a house in the countryside. It is entirely black-and-white.

== Chart positions ==
Chart (1993–1994)	Peak position
Canada Country Singles (RPM)	1
US Billboard Hot 100	75
US Hot Country Songs (Billboard)	1

=== Year-end charts ===
Chart (1994)	Position
Canada Country Tracks (RPM)	29
US Country Songs (Billboard)	15
