= Donny Parenteau =

Canadian musician

- Born: Prince Albert, Saskatchewan
- Genres: Country; Western swing
- Occupations: Musician; singer-songwriter; record producer
- Instruments: Fiddle; acoustic guitar; electric guitar; mandolin; electric mandolin; double neck guitar and mandocaster
- Years active: 1991–present
- Labels: Independent, 306 Records/EMI Music Canada
- Website: http://www.donnyparenteaumusic.com

Donny Parenteau (born in Prince Albert, Saskatchewan) is singer-songwriter, multi-instrumentalist, and record producer. He is best for known his solo career and his work as fiddle player, guitarist, and mandolin player for country music singer Neal McCoy. In February 2011, Parenteau signed with the record label 306 Records/EMI Music Canada to help distribute his albums.

== Early life ==
At 14, Parenteau took up the fiddle. After mastering the fiddle, he picked up other instruments like the guitar (both acoustic and electric) and the mandolin (both acoustic and electric). Parenteau cites some of his influences as Bryan Sklar, Freddie Pelltier, and George Pistun

== Career ==
After picking up the violin at a young age, by 19 he was playing professionally. In 1991, Parenteau was playing in Edmonton, Alberta and was invited to a show by Neal McCoy who was also playing in Edmonton. Upon talking with McCoy, Parenteau discovered they had similar taste in music. McCoy was looking for a fiddle player, but didn't have the money to hire one. Parenteau wanted the chance to audition and would not let up until he got the chance to audition. Parenteau listened to the group jamming and had a grasp of what they were playing. It was that song he would use as the audition piece. During his time touring with McCoy, Parenteau got to open for such artists as Merle Haggard, Tim McGraw, Faith Hill, Buck Owens, George Jones, Charlie Pride, Loretta Lynn, Charlie Daniels, Hank Williams, Jr., Reba McEntire, Garth Brooks, and Shania Twain. Parenteau also graced the Grand Ole Opry stage. Parenteau was the only member of the live band that was also on the recordings. After performing with Neal McCoy for 12 years and playing 250–300 shows a year, Parenteau returned to Prince Albert to embark on a solo career.

== Charity work ==
Parenteau has done a number of humanitarian and charity work. In 2001 SCMA International Humanitarian Award for his efforts. He also appears on Telemiracle starting on the 32nd edition of the telethon. Parenteau co-wrote the current Telemiracle opening theme song with Brad Johner entitled "You are the Miracle". It became the theme in 2011. He also embarks on a tour of elementary schools in Saskatchewan each year as a motivational speaker in which he spreads his message of anti-bullying.

== Discography ==
=== Studio albums ===
| Title | Album details |
|---|---|
| What It Takes | Release date: 9 October 2006; Label: Icon; Format: CD, digital download |
| To Whom It May Concern | Released: 11 January 2011; Label: Phantom; Format: CD, digital download |
| Bring It On | Released: 2012 *Re-released: 2021; Label: On Ramp; Format: Digital download, streaming |

=== Collaborations ===
| Title | Album details |
|---|---|
| Fiddle Frenzy (Brian Sklar and Donny Parenteau) | Released: 2014; Label: Self-released; Format: CD |

=== Singles ===
| Title | Year | Album |
|---|---|---|
| "Father Time" | 2009 | What It Takes |
| "I Love Christmas" | 2009 | Non-album single |
| "Postmarked Heaven" | 2010 | What It Takes |
| "Belly Up" | 2010 | What It Takes |
| "My Girl" | 2010 | To Whom It May Concern |
| Turn It Up | 2011 | To Whom It May Concern |
| "My Dirt" | 2011 | To Whom It May Concern |
| "To Whom It May Concern" | 2011 | To Whom It May Concern |
| "Watching Over Me" | 2011 | Non-album single |
| "Can't Afford to Love You" | 2012 | Bring It On |
| "Sun Shower" | 2012 | Bring It On |
| "Honey It's Broke" | 2012 | Bring It On |
| "Never Came Down Again" | 2020 | Non-album singles |
| "Bring It On" (featuring Brad Johner) | 2020 | Non-album singles |
| "Snow White" (featuring Kenny Shields) | 2021 | Non-album singles |
| "These Day's" | 2021 | Non-album singles |
| "Time off for Bad Behavior | 2022 | |
| "Roll On" | 2022 | |

=== Music videos ===
| Title | Year | Album |
|---|---|---|
| "Belly Up" | 2010 | What It Takes |
| "My Girl" | 2010 | To Whom It May Concern |
| "Imagine A World" (featuring Michele Dubois) | 2013 | —N/a |

== Awards and nominations ==
Donny Parenteau awards and nominations
Awards and nominations
| Award | Wins | Nominations |
| Aboriginal People's Choice Music Awards | 0 | 4 |
| Canadian Aboriginal Music Awards | 7 | 14 |
| Canadian Country Music Awards | 0 | 4 |
| Juno Awards | 0 | 3 |
| Saskatchewan Country Music Awards | 31 | 54 |
| Western Canadian Music Awards | 0 | 2 |

Totals (Note: Certain award groups do not simply award one winner. They acknowledge several different recipients, have runners-up, and have third place. Since this is a specific recognition and is different from losing an award, runner-up mentions are considered wins in this award tally. For simplification and to avoid errors, each award in this list has been presumed to have had a prior nomination.)
- Wins: 38
- Nominations: 84

Parenteau has been nominated for a multitude of awards all across Canada picking up a number of them along the way. In 2008, Parenteau was nominated for his country's highest honour by being nominated for a Juno Award.

| Year | Award | Nominated work | Category | Result | Ref |
|---|---|---|---|---|---|
| 2001 | Saskatchewan Country Music Awards | Himself | International Humanitarian | Won | |
| 2003 | Saskatchewan Country Music Awards | Fiddle | All-Star Band | Won | |
| 2004 | Saskatchewan Country Music Awards | Himself | Aboriginal Artist of the Year | Won | |
| 2004 | Saskatchewan Country Music Awards | Fiddle | All-Star Band | Won | |
| 2005 | Canadian Aboriginal Music Awards | "The Great Unknown" | Best Producer/Engineer | Nominated | |
| 2005 | Saskatchewan Country Music Awards | Himself | Aboriginal Artist of the Year | Won | |
| 2005 | Saskatchewan Country Music Awards | Fiddle | All-Star Band | Won | |
| 2006 | Saskatchewan Country Music Awards | Himself | Aboriginal Artist of the Year | Won | |
| 2006 | Saskatchewan Country Music Awards | Fiddle | All-Star Band | Won | |
| 2007 | Canadian Aboriginal Music Awards | What it Takes | Best Album of the Year | Nominated | |
| 2007 | Canadian Aboriginal Music Awards | What it Takes | Best Country Album | Nominated | |
| 2007 | Canadian Aboriginal Music Awards | "What It Takes" | Best Producer/Engineer | Won | |
| 2007 | Canadian Aboriginal Music Awards | "Father Time" | Best Song Single | Won | |
| 2007 | Canadian Aboriginal Music Awards | "Father Time" | Best Songwriter | Nominated | |
| 2007 | Canadian Aboriginal Music Awards | "Postmarked Heaven" | Best Songwriter | Nominated | |
| 2007 | Canadian Country Music Awards | Himself | Chevy Truck Rising Star | Nominated | |
| 2007 | Saskatchewan Country Music Awards | What It Takes | Album of the Year | Nominated | |
| 2007 | Saskatchewan Country Music Awards | Himself | Fans' Choice Entertainer of the Year | Nominated | |
| 2007 | Saskatchewan Country Music Awards | Himself | Male Vocalist of the Year | Nominated | |
| 2007 | Saskatchewan Country Music Awards | Himself | Aboriginal Artist of the Year | Won | |
| 2007 | Saskatchewan Country Music Awards | Himself | Record Producer of the Year (shared with Steve Fox) | Won | |
| 2007 | Saskatchewan Country Music Awards | Fiddle | All-Star Band | Won | |
| 2007 | Saskatchewan Country Music Awards | Specialty | All-Star Band | Won | |
| 2007 | Saskatchewan Country Music Awards | Donny Parenteau Band | Back Up Band | Won | |
| 2007 | Saskatchewan Country Music Awards | "Country Calling Me" | Single of the Year | Nominated | |
| 2007 | Saskatchewan Country Music Awards | "Country Calling Me" | Song of the Year | Nominated | |
| 2007 | Western Canadian Music Awards | What it Takes | Outstanding Aboriginal Recording | Nominated | |
| 2007 | Western Canadian Music Awards | What it Takes | Outstanding Country Recording | Nominated | |
| 2008 | Juno Awards | What it Takes | Aboriginal Recording of the Year | Nominated | |
| 2008 | Canadian Country Music Awards | Fiddle | All-Star Band | Nominated | |
| 2008 | Saskatchewan Country Music Awards | Himself | Aboriginal Artist of the Year | Won | |
| 2008 | Saskatchewan Country Music Awards | Himself | Fans' Choice Entertainer of the Year | Won | |
| 2008 | Saskatchewan Country Music Awards | Himself | Male Vocalist of the Year | Won | |
| 2008 | Saskatchewan Country Music Awards | Himself | Record Producer of the Year | Nominated | |
| 2008 | Saskatchewan Country Music Awards | Fiddle | All-Star Band | Won | |
| 2008 | Saskatchewan Country Music Awards | Donny Parenteau Band | Back Up Band | Won | |
| 2008 | Saskatchewan Country Music Awards | "Postmarked Heaven" | Single of the Year | Won | |
| 2008 | Saskatchewan Country Music Awards | "Postmarked Heaven" | Song of the Year | Won | |
| 2008 | Saskatchewan Country Music Awards | "Father Time" | Single of the Year | Nominated | |
| 2008 | Saskatchewan Country Music Awards | "Father Time" | Song of the Year | Nominated | |
| 2008 | Aboriginal People's Choice Music Awards | What It Takes | Best Country CD | Nominated | |
| 2008 | Aboriginal People's Choice Music Awards | What It Takes | Best Album Cover Design | Nominated | |
| 2009 | Canadian Country Music Awards | Fiddle | All-Star Band | Nominated | |
| 2009 | Saskatchewan Country Music Awards | Himself | Aboriginal Artist of the Year | Won | |
| 2010 | Saskatchewan Country Music Awards | Himself | Aboriginal Artist of the Year | Won | |
| 2011 | Saskatchewan Country Music Awards | Himself | Aboriginal Artist of the Year | Won | |
| 2011 | Saskatchewan Country Music Awards | Himself | Fans' Choice Entertainer of the Year | Nominated | |
| 2011 | Saskatchewan Country Music Awards | Himself | Male Vocalist of the Year | Nominated | |
| 2011 | Saskatchewan Country Music Awards | Himself | Manager of the Year | Nominated | |
| 2011 | Saskatchewan Country Music Awards | Fiddle | All-Star Band | Nominated | |
| 2011 | Saskatchewan Country Music Awards | Specialty | All-Star Band | Won | |
| 2011 | Saskatchewan Country Music Awards | "My Girl" | Single of the Year | Nominated | |
| 2011 | Saskatchewan Country Music Awards | "My Girl" | Song of the Year | Nominated | |
| 2011 | Saskatchewan Country Music Awards | "My Girl" | Video of the Year | Nominated | |
| 2011 | Aboriginal People's Choice Awards | Himself | Aboriginal Male Entertainer of the Year | Nominated | |
| 2011 | Aboriginal People's Choice Awards | To Whom It May Concern | Best Country CD | Nominated | |
| 2011 | Canadian Aboriginal Music Awards | To Whom It May Concern | Best Album of the Year | Nominated | |
| 2011 | Canadian Aboriginal Music Awards | To Whom It May Concern | Best Country Album | Won | |
| 2011 | Canadian Aboriginal Music Awards | Himself | Best Songwriter | Won | |
| 2011 | Canadian Aboriginal Music Awards | Himself | Best Male Artist | Won | |
| 2011 | Canadian Aboriginal Music Awards | Himself | Best Producer/Engineer (shared with Harry Stinson) | Won | |
| 2011 | Canadian Aboriginal Music Awards | "To Whom It May Concern" | Best Song Single | Nominated | |
| 2011 | Canadian Aboriginal Music Awards | "To Whom It May Concern" | Best Music Video | Won | |
| 2012 | Juno Awards | To Whom It May Concern | Aboriginal Recording of the Year | Nominated | |
| 2012 | Canadian Country Music Awards | Fiddle | All-Star Band | Nominated | |
| 2013 | Saskatchewan Country Music Awards | Himself | Aboriginal Artist of the Year | Won | |
| 2013 | Saskatchewan Country Music Awards | Himself | Fans' Choice Entertainer of the Year | Nominated | |
| 2013 | Saskatchewan Country Music Awards | Himself | Record Producer of the Year | Nominated | |
| 2013 | Saskatchewan Country Music Awards | Himself | Country Music Person of the Year | Nominated | |
| 2013 | Saskatchewan Country Music Awards | Bring It On | Album of the Year | Won | |
| 2013 | Saskatchewan Country Music Awards | "Sunshower" | Song of the Year | Nominated | |
| 2013 | Saskatchewan Country Music Awards | "Can't Afford to Love You" | Single of the Year | Nominated | |
| 2013 | Saskatchewan Country Music Awards | Fiddle | All-Star Band | Won | |
| 2013 | Saskatchewan Country Music Awards | Specialty | All-Star Band | Won | |
| 2013 | Juno Awards | Bring It On | Aboriginal Recording of the Year | Nominated | |
| 2014 | Saskatchewan Country Music Awards | Fiddle | All-Star Band | Won | |
| 2017 | Saskatchewan Country Music Awards | Fiddle | All-Star Band | Nominated | |
| 2017 | Saskatchewan Country Music Awards | Specialty | All-Star Band | Nominated | |
| 2020 | Saskatchewan Country Music Awards | Himself | Legends and Legacy Award | Won | |
| 2022 | Saskatchewan Country Music Awards | Himself | Record Producer of the Year (Song: "These Days") | Won | |
