= Neal McCoy =

American country music singer (born 1958)

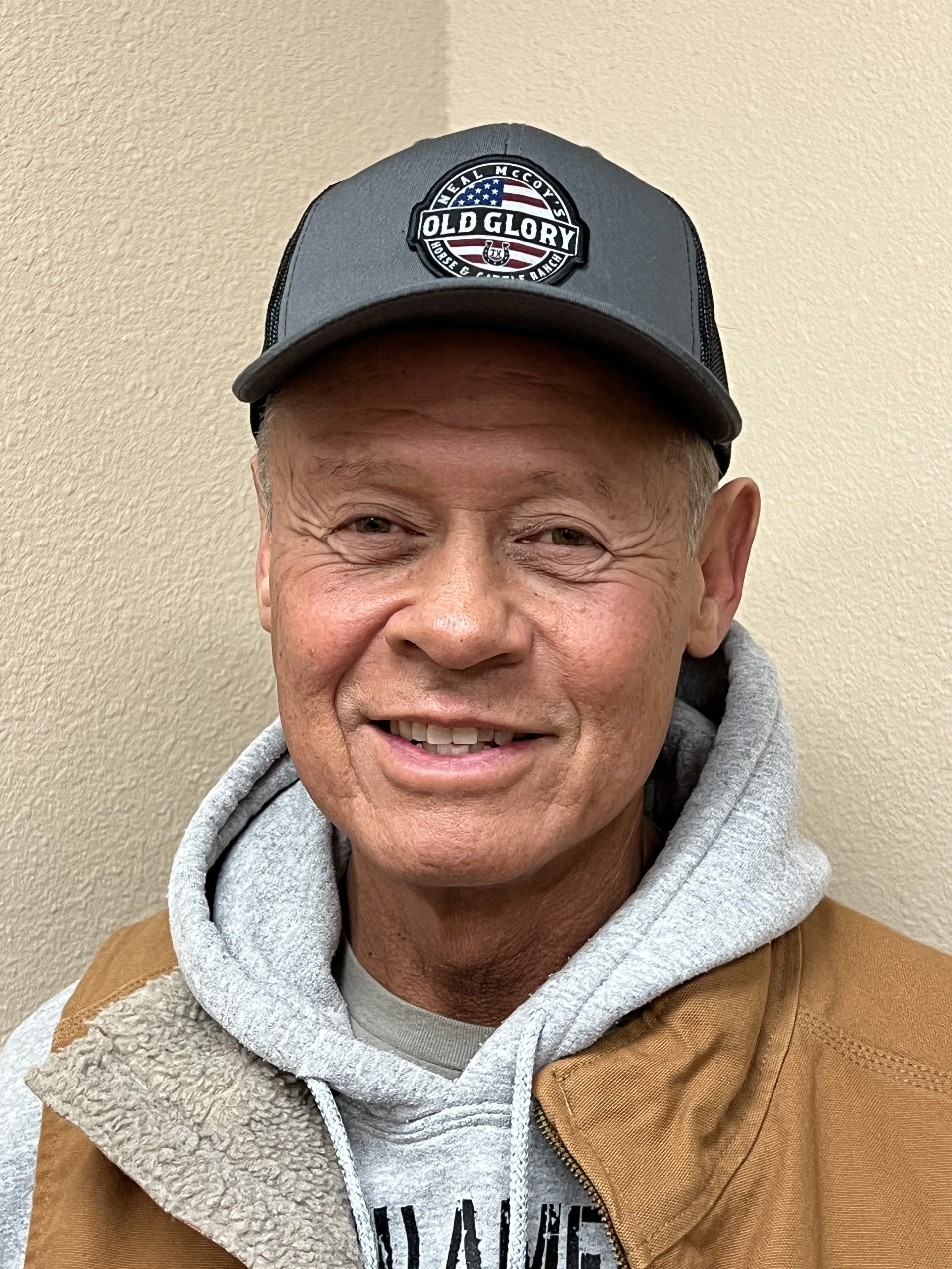
- McCoy in Tyler, Texas, in 2025

Background information
- Also known as: Neal McCoy
- Born: Hubert Neal McGaughey Jr. July 30, 1958 (age 68); Jacksonville, Texas, U.S.
- Origin: Nashville, Tennessee, U.S.
- Genre: Country
- Occupation: Singer
- Instrument: Vocals
- Years active: 1988–present
- Labels: 16th Avenue; Atlantic; Giant; Warner Bros.; SEA; 903; Tate; Blaster; Slate Creek
- Website: www.nealmccoy.com

Hubert Neal McGaughey Jr. (born July 30, 1958), known professionally as Neal McCoy and previously as Neal McGoy, is an American country music singer. He has released ten studio albums on various labels, and has released 34 singles to country radio. Although he first charted on the Billboard Hot Country Songs chart in 1988, he did not reach the top 40 for the first time until 1992's "Where Forever Begins", which peaked at number 40. McCoy broke through two years later with the back-to-back number one singles "No Doubt About It" and "Wink" from his platinum-certified album No Doubt About It. Although he has not topped the country charts since, his commercial success continued into the mid to late 1990s with two more platinum albums and a gold album, as well as six more top 10 hits. A ninth top 10 hit, the number 10 "Billy's Got His Beer Goggles On", came in 2005 from his self-released That's Life.

== Early life ==
Hubert Neal McGaughey Jr. was born on July 30, 1958, in Jacksonville, Texas, to a Filipino-American mother and Irish-American father. Inspired by the variety of music that his parents listened to, which included country, rock, disco and R&B, McGaughey first sang in his church choir before founding an R&B band. He later switched his focus to country music, performing in various bars and clubs in Texas. McGaughey, after attending junior college near his hometown, found work selling shoes at a shopping mall. In the early 1980s, he met his wife, Melinda, at the store.

After winning a 1981 talent contest hosted by Janie Fricke, he secured a spot as an opening act for Charley Pride.

== Musical career ==
Crediting himself as Neal McGoy, a phonetic spelling of his surname, he signed to the independent 16th Avenue Records label in 1988. He released the singles "That's How Much I Love You" and "That's American", and although the former reached No. 85 on the country charts, he did not release an album for the label. He continued to tour as an opening act for Pride until 1990, the same year that the 16th Avenue label closed.

=== 1990–2000: Atlantic Records ===
He then signed to Atlantic Records in 1990, changing his surname to McCoy per the label's request, as fans had already begun to refer to him as McCoy. His debut album, At This Moment, was released that year. None of the three singles made the country Top 40, although the lead-off single "If I Built You a Fire" was a Top 20 country hit in Canada. The other two releases were the title track, a cover of Billy Vera and the Beaters' #1 Hot 100 hit from late 1986-early 1987, and "This Time I've Hurt Her More Than She Loves Me", which was co-written by Earl Thomas Conley and originally recorded by Conway Twitty. McCoy continued touring and developed a "reputation for exciting, freewheeling live shows."

A second album for Atlantic, Where Forever Begins, followed in 1992. This album produced his first American Top 40 country hit in its No. 40-peaking title track, followed by "There Ain't Nothin' I Don't Like About You" at No. 57, and "Now I Pray for Rain" at No. 26. The album was also his first entry on Top Country Albums, at No. 58.

Working with producer Barry Beckett for the first time, McCoy released his breakthrough album, No Doubt About It, in 1994. The album produced his only number 1 country hits in its title track and "Wink", both of which also made minor entries on the Billboard Hot 100. The album also earned a platinum certification from the Recording Industry Association of America (RIAA) and gold certification from the Canadian Recording Industry Association (CRIA). Its final single was "The City Put the Country Back in Me" at No. 5.

=== Mid-Late 1990s ===
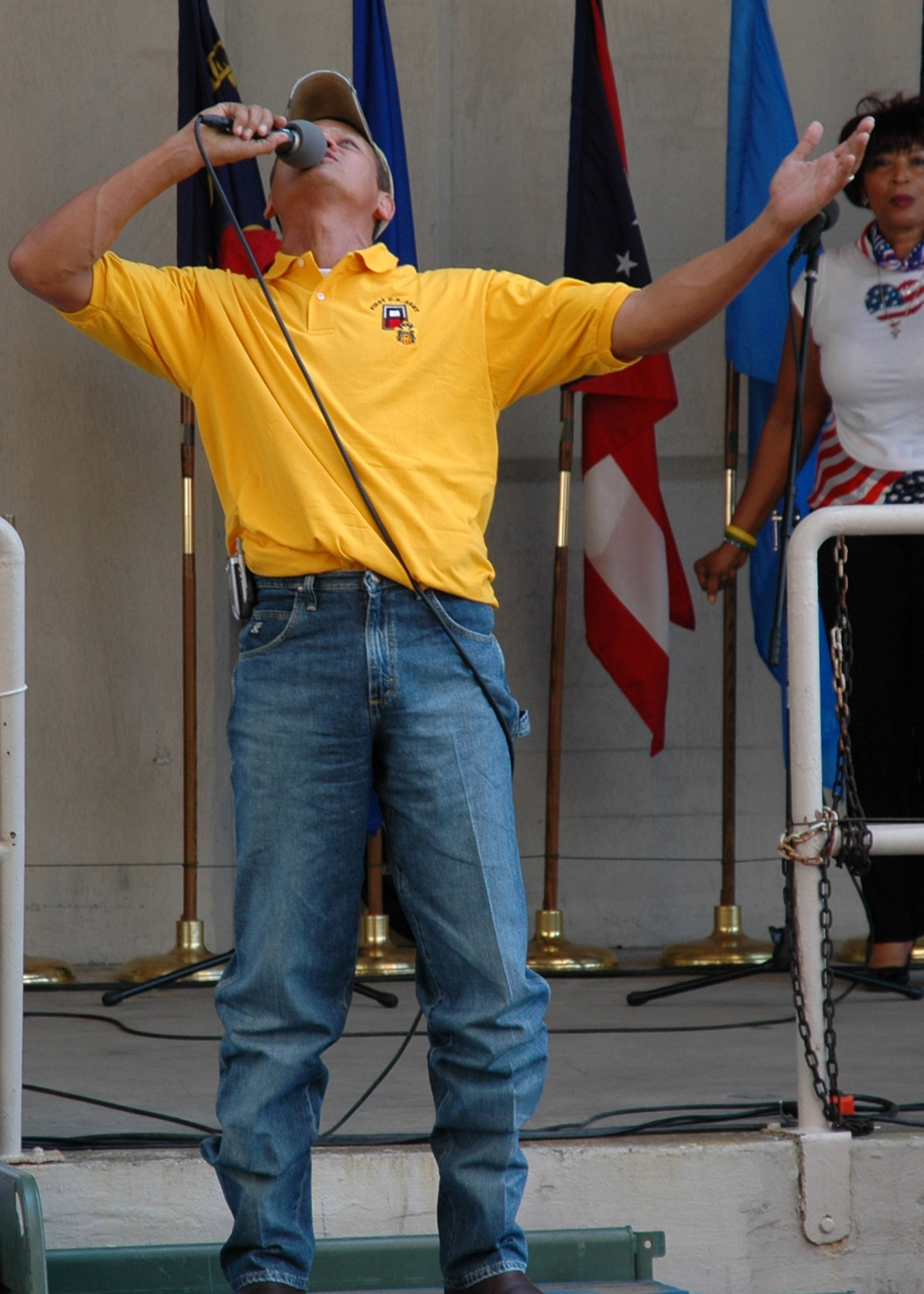
McCoy in 2005.

You Gotta Love That, his fourth album, also received a platinum certification and it produced four singles: "For a Change", "They're Playin' Our Song" and the title track (respectively the first, second, and fourth singles) all peaked at No. 3, while "If I Was a Drinkin' Man" reached No. 16.

McCoy's self-titled fifth studio album began a decline in his chart momentum. Although it was certified gold, Neal McCoy accounted for only one Top Ten hit in a cover of The Casinos' 1967 doo-wop single "Then You Can Tell Me Goodbye". The next two singles — "Going, Going, Gone" and "That Woman of Mine" — both peaked at No. 35. Also in 1996, he sang guest vocals on the multi-artist charity single "Hope", the proceeds of which went to the T. J. Martell Foundation's cancer research. After "That Woman of Mine", he reached No. 5 with "The Shake", the only new song on his first Greatest Hits package, which reprised nine of his greatest hits to that point and also earned platinum certification.

Be Good at It, his sixth studio release, followed in 1998. This was his first album since Where Forever Begins not to include a Top Ten hit. The title track, "If You Can't Be Good, Be Good at It", was the highest-peaking single release from it at No. 22, followed by "Party On", which became his first single since 1992 to miss Top 40 entirely. After it came the No. 29 "Love Happens Like That." McCoy made a second appearance on a multi-artist charity single that same year, as one of several collaborators on "One Heart at a Time", a song written by Victoria Shaw to benefit cystic fibrosis research.

In 1999, McCoy released his final album for Atlantic, The Life of the Party. It only accounted for two singles: the Phil Vassar co-write "I Was" at No. 37 and "The Girls of Summer" at No. 42. He, Tracy Byrd, and T. Graham Brown also sang guest vocals on "Now That's Awesome", a song featuring snippets of a Bill Engvall comedy sketch, found on Engvall's Now That's Awesome album. This single peaked at No. 59. McCoy has performed every July since 1994 at The Hodag Country Festival in Rhinelander, Wisconsin.

=== 2000–04: Warner Bros. Records and SEA Records ===
Due to the closure of Atlantic Records' Nashville division in mid-2000, McCoy's next album, 24-7-365, was issued via Giant Records. It included the singles "Forever Works for Me (Monday, Tuesday, Wednesday, Thursday)", "Every Man for Himself", and "Beatin' It In", at No. 38, No. 37, and No. 41 respectively. In late 2000, he released a Christmas medley consisting of "I'll Be Home for Christmas" and "Have Yourself a Merry Little Christmas", which reached number 74 based on seasonal airplay. After Giant closed as well, he moved again to Warner Bros. Records, where he recorded The Luckiest Man in the World. Although the title track entered the country charts and peaked at number 46, the album itself was not released, and McCoy exited Warner Bros. by the end of the year. He signed with an independent label called SEA Records in 2004, and was slated to release a single for it in the middle of the year, but he left the label without releasing anything.

=== 2005–07 ===
In 2005, Neal McCoy and his manager Karen Kane founded a label called 903 Music. His first single for his own label was "Billy's Got His Beer Goggles On", which reached the Top 10 on the Hot Country Songs chart in 2005. The song served as the lead-off to his 2005 album That's Life. Also included on the album were a cover of Charley Pride's "You're My Jamaica," (Charley Pride also appeared on the tune), and a live version of "Hillbilly Rap", which he had performed in concert since the early 1990s. McCoy's next single release, "The Last of a Dying Breed", a song preceded by a spoken-word intro from United States Army general Tommy Franks, peaked at 36.

Darryl Worley and the Drew Davis Band were signed to 903 as well. Worley released his 2006 album Here and Now on 903, which produced the top 40 hits "Nothin' but a Love Thang" and "I Just Came Back from a War". In May 2007, McCoy announced that the label had filed for bankruptcy and closed its doors.

In Summer of 2007, Neal could be seen showing off his comedic chops on local TV commercials in the Waco, Texas market for Mike Craig Chevrolet Pontiac Buick in Marlin, Texas. The commercials continued for approximately one year. In one of them Neal acts like a puppet in the hands of the branch manager of the Mike Craig dealership in Hillsboro, Texas.

=== 2008–13: The Very Best of Neal McCoy, XII, and Pride ===
In 2008, Rhino Records issued a compilation album entitled The Very Best of Neal McCoy. This album reprised most of his biggest chart hits to that point, and it included the new recording "Rednecktified", which was released as a single but did not chart. Later that same year, he issued another single, "For the Troops", which also failed to chart. McCoy released a book titled New Mountain to Climb in 2011, which coincided with the release of a single of the same name.

In April 2011, McCoy signed with Blaster Music. He released his twelfth album, XII, for the label on March 6, 2012. Blake Shelton and Miranda Lambert co-produced the album with Brent Rowan, and sang backing vocals on its lead-off single "A-OK".

A year later, McCoy released Pride: A Tribute to Charley Pride via Slate Creek Records, under the production of Garth Fundis. The album features guest appearances from Darius Rucker, Trace Adkins, and Raul Malo of The Mavericks. To promote the album, McCoy and Pride filmed a video for "Kaw-Liga", which was co-written and originally recorded by Hank Williams before Pride covered it in 1969. On August 25, 2023, McCoy released a new single titled "Used Car".

On September 22, 2026, McCoy was invited by Pam Tillis to become a member of the Grand Ole Opry, one of country music's crowning achievements for living artists. Tillis was joined by Pride's wife Rozene on stage for the invitation, which took place during a special tribute show to Pride. He will be inducted at a date to be determined.

== Personal life ==
McCoy has been married to Melinda since 1980. The two met when McCoy was working at a shoe store in a local mall. The couple have two children, a son and a daughter.

McCoy is also the head of a charity called the East Texas Angel Network, which helps provide money for families of seriously ill children.

McCoy resides in Longview, Texas.

== Discography ==
- At This Moment (1990)
- Where Forever Begins (1992)
- No Doubt About It (1994)
- You Gotta Love That! (1995)
- Neal McCoy (1996)
- Be Good at It (1997)
- The Life of the Party (1999)
- 24-7-365 (2000)
- That's Life (2005)
- XII (2012)
- Pride: A Tribute to Charley Pride (2013)
- You Don't Know Me (2016)

=== Billboard number-one hits ===
- "No Doubt About It" (2 weeks, 1994)
- "Wink" (4 weeks, 1994)

== Awards and nominations ==
=== Grammy Awards ===
Year	Nominee / work	Award	Result
1997	Hope: Country Music's Quest for a Cure	Best Country Collaboration with Vocals	Nominated

=== TNN/Music City News Country Awards ===
Year	Nominee / work	Award	Result
1997	"Then You Can Tell Me Goodbye"	Video of the Year	Won
1998	"The Shake"	Video of the Year	Nominated
1998	Neal McCoy	Entertainer of the Year	Won
1999	Neal McCoy	Entertainer of the Year	Won

=== Academy of Country Music Awards ===
Year	Nominee / work	Award	Result
1995	Neal McCoy	Top New Male Vocalist	Shortlisted
1995	"Wink"	Single Record of the Year	Shortlisted
2005	Neal McCoy	Home Depot Humanitarian Award	Won
