= Charlie Major discography =

- Studio albums: 7
- Compilation albums: 4
- Singles: 32
- Music videos: 10

Charlie Major is a Canadian country music artist. His discography comprises seven studio albums, four greatest hits albums and thirty-two singles.

== Studio albums ==
=== 1990s ===
Title	Album details	Peak chart positions		Certifications (sales thresholds)
Title	Album details	CAN Country	CAN	Certifications (sales thresholds)
The Other Side	Release date: June 25, 1993; Label: Arista Records; Formats: CD, cassette	1	54	CAN: 2× Platinum
Lucky Man	Release date: September 29, 1995; Label: Arista Records; Formats: CD, cassette	4	49	CAN: Platinum
Everything's Alright	Release date: September 30, 1997; Label: ViK. Recordings; Formats: CD, cassette	11	—	
"—" denotes releases that did not chart

=== 2000s and 2010s ===
Title	Album details
444^{[A]}	Release date: March 21, 2000; Label: Dead Reckoning Records; Formats: CD, cassette
Inside Out	Release date: April 24, 2004; Label: Stony Plain Records; Formats: CD, music download
Shadows and Light	Release date: October 17, 2006; Label: Koch Entertainment Canada; Formats: CD, music download
On the Evening Side	Release date: June 21, 2011; Label: EMI Canada; Formats: CD, music download

== Compilation albums ==
Title	Details
Here and Now	Release date: October 8, 1996; Label: Imprint Records; Formats: CD, cassette
Collections	Release date: November 28, 2006; Label: Sony BMG Canada; Formats: CD, music download
Greatest Hits	Release date: January 8, 2007; Label: ViK. Recordings; Formats: CD, music download
Best 20 of the Last 20: The Greatest Hits	Release date: September 10, 2013; Label: MDM Recordings; Formats: CD, music download
More of the Best: Greatest Hits 2	Release date: September 7, 2018; Label: MDM Recordings; Formats: CD, music download

== Singles ==
=== 1990s ===
Year	Single	Peak positions	Album
Year	Single	CAN Country	Album
1993	"I'm Gonna Drive You Out of My Mind"	1	The Other Side
1993	"I'm Somebody"	1	The Other Side
1994	"Nobody Gets Too Much Love"	1	The Other Side
1994	"The Other Side"	1	The Other Side
1994	"It Can't Happen to Me"	1	The Other Side
1994	"I'm Here"	1	The Other Side
1995	"(I Do It) For the Money"	1	Lucky Man
1995	"Tell Me Something I Don't Know"	1	Lucky Man
1996	"It's Lonely I Can't Stand"	1	Lucky Man
1996	"(I Do It) For the Money" (US release)	—	Here and Now
1996	"Waiting on You"	2	Lucky Man
1996	"This Crazy Heart of Mine"	8	Lucky Man
1997	"I'm Feeling Kind of Lucky Tonight"	1	Everything's Alright
1998	"Some Days Are Better"	4	Everything's Alright
1998	"Thank the Lord for the Night Time"	48	Everything's Alright
1998	"You Can Trust in My Love"	10	Everything's Alright
1999	"Right Here, Right Now"	8	444
"—" denotes releases that did not chart

=== 2000s and 2010s ===
Year	Single	Album
2000	"One True Love"^{[B]}	444
2000	"Side by Side"	444
2004	"My Brother and Me"	Inside Out
2004	"When You're Good You're Good"	Inside Out
2005	"I'm Alright"	Inside Out
2006	"You'd Better Go"	Inside Out
2006	"Young at Heart" (with Kim Mitchell)	Shadows and Light
2007	"Better World"	Shadows and Light
2007	"That's When I Feel Loved"	Shadows and Light
2008	"Make It Right"	—N/a
2011	"Through God's Eyes"	On the Evening Side
2011	"Keep On Living"	On the Evening Side
2012	"My Lover Now"	On the Evening Side
2013	"Hold Me"	On the Evening Side
2013	"A Night to Remember"	Best 20 of the Last 20: The Greatest Hits
2013	"Friday Nights and You"	Best 20 of the Last 20: The Greatest Hits

== Music videos ==
Year	Video	Director
1993	"I'm Gonna Drive You Out of My Mind"	David Storey
1994	"Nobody Gets Too Much Love"	David Storey
1995	"(I Do It) For the Money"	
1995	"Tell Me Something I Don't Know"	
1996	"This Crazy Heart of Mine"	
1996	"(I Do It) For the Money"	Jim Yukich
1997	"I'm Feeling Kind of Lucky Tonight"	
1998	"Some Days Are Better"	
1999	"Right Here, Right Now" (with Joy Lynn White)	Eric Welch
2008	"Make It Right"	

== Notes ==
- A 444 peaked at number 21 on the Canadian RPM Country Albums/CDs chart.
- B "One True Love" peaked at number 31 on the Canadian RPM Country Tracks chart.
