= 1993 in country music =

This is a list of notable events in country music that took place in the year 1993.

== Events ==
- December 28 – Newcomer Shania Twain and record producer and songwriter Robert John "Mutt" Lange are married. Twain had just released her first album, produced by Norro Wilson earlier in the year, and although it gained largely positive critical reviews, the album was not a big seller. Twain, hiring Lange as her producer, will quickly begin work to improve her fortunes exponentially.

== Top hits of the year ==
=== Singles released by American artists ===
US	CAN	Single	Artist	Reference
1	1	Ain't Goin' Down ('Til the Sun Comes Up)	Garth Brooks	
2	1	Ain't That Lonely Yet	Dwight Yoakam	
1	1	Alibis	Tracy Lawrence	
3	2	All These Years	Sawyer Brown	
1	2	Almost Goodbye	Mark Chesnutt	
5	4	Alright Already	Larry Stewart	
1	2	American Honky-Tonk Bar Association	Garth Brooks	
10	17	Anywhere but Here	Sammy Kershaw	
2	1	A Bad Goodbye	Clint Black with Wynonna Judd	
21	13	Beer and Bones	John Michael Montgomery	
1	2	Blame It on Your Heart	Patty Loveless	
19	39	Boom! It Was Over	Robert Ellis Orrall	
6	5	Born to Love You	Mark Collie	
16	24	The Bug	Mary Chapin Carpenter	
18	16	Cadillac Ranch	Chris LeDoux	
1	1	Can I Trust You with My Heart	Travis Tritt	
1	2	Can't Break It to My Heart	Tracy Lawrence	
1	1	Chattahoochee	Alan Jackson	
11	28	Cleopatra, Queen of Denial	Pam Tillis	
46	10	Cowboy Boogie	Randy Travis	
12	16	A Cowboy's Born with a Broken Heart	Boy Howdy	
16	19	Do You Know Where Your Man Is	Pam Tillis	
1	1	Does He Love You	Reba McEntire with Linda Davis	
19	21	Down on My Knees	Trisha Yearwood	
2	4	Drive South	Suzy Bogguss	
20	28	Easier Said Than Done	Radney Foster	
1	1	Easy Come, Easy Go	George Strait	
3	3	Every Little Thing	Carlene Carter	
4	—	God Blessed Texas	Little Texas	
8	14	Half Enough	Lorrie Morgan	
11	11	The Hard Way	Mary Chapin Carpenter	
4	1	Hard Workin' Man	Brooks & Dunn	
9	10	Haunted Heart	Sammy Kershaw	
5	11	He Ain't Worth Missing	Toby Keith	
1	1	The Heart Won't Lie	Reba McEntire & Vince Gill	
1	1	Heartland	George Strait	
2	6	Hearts Are Gonna Roll	Hal Ketchum	
20	18	High Rollin'	Gibson/Miller Band	
1	3	Holdin' Heaven	Tracy Byrd	
3	1	Hometown Honeymoon	Alabama	
5	11	Honky Tonk Attitude	Joe Diffie	
17	8	Hurry Sundown	McBride & the Ride	
1	27	I Don't Call Him Daddy	Doug Supernaw	
13	22	I Fell in the Water	John Anderson	
14	14	I Guess You Had to Be There	Lorrie Morgan	
1	1	I Love the Way You Love Me	John Michael Montgomery	
22	9	I Wanna Take Care of You	Billy Dean	
7	14	I Want You Bad (And That Ain't Good)	Collin Raye	
16	13	I'd Rather Miss You	Little Texas	
34	18	I'm Not Built That Way	Billy Dean	
8	8	If I Didn't Love You	Steve Wariner	
2	3	In a Week or Two	Diamond Rio	
3	1	In the Heart of a Woman	Billy Ray Cyrus	
1	1	It Sure Is Monday	Mark Chesnutt	
2	3	It's a Little Too Late	Tanya Tucker	
5	5	It's Your Call	Reba McEntire	
15	7	Janie Baker's Love Slave	Shenandoah	
5	5	Just Like the Weather	Suzy Bogguss	
5	6	Just One Night	McBride & the Ride	
2	5	Learning to Live Again	Garth Brooks	
15	24	Leavin's Been a Long Time Comin'	Shenandoah	
6	8	Let Go	Brother Phelps	
7	11	Let Go of the Stone	John Anderson	
4	7	Let That Pony Run	Pam Tillis	
4	3	Life's a Dance	John Michael Montgomery	
30	12	Like a River to the Sea	Steve Wariner	
1	1	Look Heart, No Hands	Randy Travis	
11	4	Looking Out for Number One	Travis Tritt	
3	8	Love on the Loose, Heart on the Run	McBride & the Ride	
8	10	Love Without Mercy	Lee Roy Parnell	
6	15	Made for Lovin' You	Doug Stone	
8	14	Mama Knows the Highway	Hal Ketchum	
13	3	Mending Fences	Restless Heart	
2	2	Mercury Blues	Alan Jackson	
1	1	Money in the Bank	John Anderson	
2	1	My Baby Loves Me	Martina McBride	
7	16	My Blue Angel	Aaron Tippin	
1	6	My Second Home	Tracy Lawrence	
4	4	My Strongest Weakness	Wynonna Judd	
3	2	No Future in the Past	Vince Gill	
3	2	No Time to Kill	Clint Black	
2	7	Nobody Wins	Radney Foster	
20	23	Nothin' but the Wheel	Patty Loveless	
5	8	Oh Me, Oh My, Sweet Baby	Diamond Rio	
4	2	Ol' Country	Mark Chesnutt	
6	12	On the Road	Lee Roy Parnell	
3	2	Once Upon a Lifetime	Alabama	
1	1	One More Last Chance	Vince Gill	
3	3	Only Love	Wynonna	
4	5	Passionate Kisses	Mary Chapin Carpenter	
3	2	Prop Me Up Beside the Jukebox (If I Die)	Joe Diffie	
2	3	Queen of Memphis	Confederate Railroad	
7	3	Queen of My Double-Wide Trailer	Sammy Kershaw	
1	1	Reckless	Alabama	
4	12	Reno	Doug Supernaw	
1	1	She Don't Know She's Beautiful	Sammy Kershaw	
1	1	She Used to Be Mine	Brooks & Dunn	
6	3	She's Not Cryin' Anymore	Billy Ray Cyrus	
1	1	Should've Been a Cowboy	Toby Keith	
5	11	Somebody Else's Moon	Collin Raye	
9	14	Somebody New	Billy Ray Cyrus	
8	19	Somebody Paints the Wall	Tracy Lawrence	
24	6	Someplace Far Away (Careful What You're Dreaming)	Hal Ketchum	
1	1	Somewhere Other Than the Night	Garth Brooks	
2	4	The Song Remembers When	Trisha Yearwood	
2	15	Soon	Tanya Tucker	
19	24	Standing Knee Deep in a River (Dying of Thirst)	Kathy Mattea	
3	6	Sure Love	Hal Ketchum	
5	1	Take It Back	Reba McEntire	
4	3	Tell Me About It	Tanya Tucker with Delbert McClinton	
3	1	Tell Me Why	Wynonna Judd	
2	10	Tender Moment	Lee Roy Parnell	
1	1	Thank God for You	Sawyer Brown	
1	1	That Summer	Garth Brooks	
4	15	That Was a River	Collin Raye	
13	5	This Romeo Ain't Got Julie Yet	Diamond Rio	
2	3	A Thousand Miles from Nowhere	Dwight Yoakam	
4	4	Tonight I Climbed the Wall	Alan Jackson	
1	1	Too Busy Being in Love	Doug Stone	
10	12	Trashy Women	Confederate Railroad	
13	17	T-R-O-U-B-L-E	Travis Tritt	
5	7	Trouble on the Line	Sawyer Brown	
6	1	Tryin' to Hide a Fire in the Dark	Billy Dean	
2	2	Walkaway Joe	Trisha Yearwood	
11	25	We Got the Love	Restless Heart	
2	1	We'll Burn That Bridge	Brooks & Dunn	
2	11	What Might Have Been	Little Texas	
1	1	What Part of No	Lorrie Morgan	
17	21	What Were You Thinkin'	Little Texas	
1	1	What's It to You	Clay Walker	
6	6	When Did You Stop Loving Me	George Strait	
1	1	When My Ship Comes In	Clint Black	
14	18	When You Leave That Way You Can Never Go Back	Confederate Railroad	
1	6	Why Didn't I Think of That	Doug Stone	
5	4	Wild Man	Ricky Van Shelton	
7	6	Workin' Man's Ph.D	Aaron Tippin	
12	24	You Say You Will	Trisha Yearwood	

=== Singles released by Canadian artists ===
US	CAN	Single	Artist	Reference
—	14	Already Gone	Blue Rodeo	
—	7	Blank Pages	Patricia Conroy	
—	5	Breakfast Alone	George Fox	
—	9	Breakin' All Over Town	Joan Kennedy	
55	14	The Change	Michelle Wright	
—	16	Country Girl	Lisa Brokop	
—	18	Cryer's Paradise	Ron Hynes	
—	19	Dealers in Heartaches	Morris P. Rainville	
—	4	Distant Drum	Jim Witter	
—	9	Dream On	Joan Kennedy	
—	5	Everything and More	Jim Witter	
—	9	Fare Thee Well Love	The Rankin Family	
—	17	Fortunate Home	Tim Thorney	
—	11	Fortune Smiled on Me	Cassandra Vasik with Russell deCarle	
—	4	Gillis Mountain	The Rankin Family	
31	3	He Would Be Sixteen	Michelle Wright	
—	9	I Need to Hear It from You	Joan Kennedy	
—	1	I'm Gonna Drive You Out of My Mind	Charlie Major	
—	1	I'm Somebody	Charlie Major	
—	17	If Only You Knew	Tracey Prescott & Lonesome Daddy	
—	10	It Might as Well Be Me	Anita Perras	
—	6	Make Love to Me	Anne Murray	
—	5	Mustang Heart	George Fox	
—	9	Roll Like a Wheel	Cassandra Vasik	
—	7	Sadly Mistaken	Cassandra Vasik	
—	19	A Song for Brent	Cindy Church	
—	7	Starting All Over Again	One Horse Blue	
—	7	Talk to My Heart	Joan Kennedy	
—	8	What Do You Care	Patricia Conroy	
—	9	You're My Hometown	Don Neilson	

== Top new album releases ==
US	CAN	Album	Artist	Record label
15	5	Across the Borderline	Willie Nelson	Columbia
5	5	Alibis	Tracy Lawrence	Atlantic
6	7	Almost Goodbye	Mark Chesnutt	MCA Nashville
6	8	Big Time	Little Texas	Warner Bros.
17		A Bridge I Didn't Burn	Ricky Van Shelton	Columbia
6	12	Call of the Wild	Aaron Tippin	RCA Nashville
16	4	Cheap Seats	Alabama	RCA Nashville
8	1	Clay Walker	Clay Walker	Giant
	10	Closer to Paradise	Barra MacNeils	Mercury/PolyGram
1	1	Common Thread: The Songs of the Eagles	Various Artists	Giant
	1	Country Heat 3	Various Artists	RCA
34	19	Cowgirl's Prayer	Emmylou Harris	Asylum
54	1	Croonin'	Anne Murray	SBK/Capitol
51	19	Drive	Steve Wariner	Arista Nashville
2	2	Easy Come, Easy Go	George Strait	MCA Nashville
	6	Even Cowgirls Get the Blues Soundtrack	k.d. lang	Sire
	20	Feels Like Home	Cassandra Vasik	Epic
14	4	Fire in the Dark	Billy Dean	Liberty
	3	Five Days in July	Blue Rodeo	Warner
	2	For Our Fans	Alabama	RCA Nashville
	16	Girls Will Be Girls	Farmer's Daughter	Stubble Jumper
15		Greatest Hits 1990–1992	Tanya Tucker	Liberty
1	9	Greatest Hits Volume Two	Reba McEntire	MCA Nashville
2	1	Hard Workin' Man	Brooks & Dunn	Arista Nashville
11	10	Haunted Heart	Sammy Kershaw	Mercury/PolyGram
6	6	Honky Tonk Angels	Dolly Parton, Loretta Lynn & Tammy Wynette	Columbia
10		Honky Tonk Attitude	Joe Diffie	Epic
7		Honky Tonk Christmas	Alan Jackson	Arista Nashville
1	1	In Pieces	Garth Brooks	Liberty
1	1	It Won't Be the Last	Billy Ray Cyrus	Mercury/PolyGram
13	1	John Berry	John Berry	Liberty
	2	Kickin' Country	Various Artists	Sony
3	26	Let There Be Peace on Earth	Vince Gill	MCA Nashville
35	2	Little Love Letters	Carlene Carter	Giant
38	8	Mark Collie	Mark Collie	MCA Nashville
26	19	Merry Christmas from London	Lorrie Morgan	BNA
20	5	More Love	Doug Stone	Epic
	7	Mustang Heart	George Fox	Warner
2	3	No Time to Kill	Clint Black	RCA Nashville
	1	North Country	The Rankin Family	EMI
59	17	On the Road	Lee Roy Parnell	Arista Nashville
	4	One Horse Blue	One Horse Blue	Savannah
9		Only What I Feel	Patty Loveless	Epic
	1	The Other Side	Charlie Major	Arista
25		Out of Left Field	Hank Williams, Jr.	Curb/Warner Bros.
13	2	Outskirts of Town	Sawyer Brown	Curb
22		Rave On!!	The Kentucky Headhunters	Mercury/PolyGram
27	18	Red and Rio Grande	Doug Supernaw	BNA
4	15	Slow Dancing with the Moon	Dolly Parton	Columbia
12	13	Solid Ground	John Anderson	BNA
6	18	The Song Remembers When	Trisha Yearwood	MCA Nashville
18	11	Soon	Tanya Tucker	Liberty
7	2	Take Me as I Am	Faith Hill	Warner Bros.
1		Tell Me Why	Wynonna Judd	Curb/MCA Nashville
4	1	This Time	Dwight Yoakam	Reprise
17		Toby Keith	Toby Keith	Mercury/PolyGram
	2	Today's Country Gold '93	Various Artists	Quality
24		Today's Hit Country	Various Artists	K-Tel
24		Tracy Byrd	Tracy Byrd	MCA Nashville
35	17	Tribute to the Music of Bob Wills	Asleep at the Wheel	Liberty
38	8	Under the Kudzu	Shenandoah	RCA Nashville
21		Under This Old Hat	Chris LeDoux	Liberty
14	8	The Way That I Am	Martina McBride	RCA Nashville
24	5	Wind in the Wire	Randy Travis	Warner Bros.
3		You Might Be a Redneck If...	Jeff Foxworthy	Warner Bros.

=== Other top albums ===
US	CAN	Album	Artist	Record label
75		America, I Believe in You	Charlie Daniels	Liberty
51		The Beverly Hillbillies Soundtrack	Various Artists	Fox
	27	Country Dance Mixes	Various Artists	Atlantic
55		Delta Dreamland	Deborah Allen	Giant
	28	Dr. Stompin' Tom...Eh?	Stompin' Tom Connors	EMI
29		Final Touches	Conway Twitty	MCA Nashville
51		Good News	Kathy Mattea	Mercury/PolyGram
60		Greatest Hits	Patty Loveless	MCA Nashville
31	27	Greatest Hits: Songs from an Aging Sex Bomb	K. T. Oslin	RCA Nashville
46		Heroes	Mark O'Connor	Warner Bros.
30		High-Tech Redneck	George Jones	MCA Nashville
53		Hurry Sundown	McBride & the Ride	MCA Nashville
28		Jingle Bell Rock	Brenda Lee	MCA
	26	Kick Along with Stompin' Tom	Stompin' Tom Connors	EMI
56		Let Go	Brother Phelps	Asylum
37		Ricky Lynn Gregg	Ricky Lynn Gregg	Liberty
67	28	Shania Twain	Shania Twain	Mercury/PolyGram
61		Shawn Camp	Shawn Camp	Reprise
27		Something Up My Sleeve	Suzy Bogguss	Liberty
62		Spinning Around the Sun	Jimmie Dale Gilmore	Elektra
53		Steppin' Country	Various Artists	K-Tel
55		Temptation	Shelby Lynne	Morgan Creek
37		Today's Top Country	Various Artists	K-Tel
	26	Way Beyond the Blue	Anita Perras	Savannah
37		The Wheel	Rosanne Cash	Columbia
65		Where There's Smoke	Gibson/Miller Band	Epic

== On television ==
=== Regular series ===
- Hee Haw (1969–1993, syndicated)

== Births ==
- March 24 – Mo Pitney, country singer who released his first radio hit, "Country".
- May 13 – William Michael Morgan, young country singer who released his first radio hit, "I Met a Girl".
- May 13 – Morgan Wallen, performer of the 2010s ("Whiskey Glasses").
- September 12 – Kelsea Ballerini, country pop singer-songwriter known for her 2014 debut hit "Love Me Like You Mean It".
- October 9 – Scotty McCreery, winner of the 10th season of American Idol, with follow-up successes including "I Love You This Big" and his first No. 1 hit, "Five More Minutes".
- October 21 – Kane Brown, country music singer and songwriter who released his radio hit, "Used to Love You Sober".

== Deaths ==
- June 5 — Conway Twitty, 59, giant music star since the 1950s who set records for most No. 1 country hits until 2006 (abdominal aneurysm).
- November 30 — David Houston, 57, top country singer of the 1960s and early 1970s, best known for "Almost Persuaded" (brain aneurysm).

== Hall of Fame inductees ==
=== Bluegrass Music Hall of Fame inductees ===
- Mac Wiseman
- Jim & Jesse
  - Jim McReynolds
  - Jesse McReynolds

=== Country Music Hall of Fame inductees ===
- Willie Nelson (born 1933)

=== Canadian Country Music Hall of Fame inductees ===
- Ward Allen
- Stu Phillips
- Bob Nolan
- Stu Davis
- Ted Daigle
- Frank Jones

== Major awards ==
=== Grammy Awards ===
- Best Female Country Vocal Performance — "Passionate Kisses", Mary Chapin Carpenter
- Best Male Country Vocal Performance — "Ain't That Lonely Yet", Dwight Yoakam
- Best Country Performance by a Duo or Group with Vocal — "Hard Workin' Man", Brooks & Dunn
- Best Country Collaboration with Vocals — "Does He Love You", Reba McEntire and Linda Davis
- Best Country Instrumental Performance — "Red Wing", Asleep at the Wheel, Chet Atkins, Eldon Shamblin, Johnny Gimble, Marty Stuart, Reuben "Lucky Oceans" Gosfield & Vince Gill
- Best Country Song — "Passionate Kisses", Lucinda Williams (Performer: Mary Chapin Carpenter)
- Best Bluegrass Album — Waitin' for the Hard Times to Go, The Nashville Bluegrass Band

=== Juno Awards ===
- Country Male Vocalist of the Year — Charlie Major
- Country Female Vocalist of the Year — Cassandra Vasik
- Country Group or Duo of the Year — The Rankin Family

=== Academy of Country Music ===
- Entertainer of the Year — Garth Brooks
- Song of the Year — "I Love the Way You Love Me", Victoria Shaw and Chuck Cannon (Performer: John Michael Montgomery)
- Single of the Year — "Chattahoochee", Alan Jackson
- Album of the Year — A Lot About Livin' (And a Little 'Bout Love), Alan Jackson
- Top Male Vocalist — Vince Gill
- Top Female Vocalist — Wynonna
- Top Vocal Duo — Brooks & Dunn
- Top Vocal Group — Little Texas
- Top New Male Vocalist — John Michael Montgomery
- Top New Female Vocalist — Faith Hill
- Top New Vocal Duo or Group — Gibson/Miller Band
- Video of the Year — "We Shall Be Free," Garth Brooks (Directors: Garth Brooks and Tim Miller)

=== ARIA Awards ===
(presented in Sydney on April 14, 1993)

- Best Country Album – The Outback Club (Lee Kernaghan)

=== Canadian Country Music Association ===
- Bud Country Fans' Choice Award — Michelle Wright
- Male Artist of the Year — George Fox
- Female Artist of the Year — Michelle Wright
- Group or Duo of the Year — The Rankin Family
- SOCAN Song of the Year — "Backroads", Charlie Major
- Single of the Year — "He Would Be Sixteen", Michelle Wright
- Album of the Year — Bad Day for Trains, Patricia Conroy
- Top Selling Album — Some Gave All, Billy Ray Cyrus
- Video of the Year — "He Would Be Sixteen", Michelle Wright
- Vista Rising Star Award — The Rankin Family
- Vocal Collaboration of the Year — Cassandra Vasik and Russell deCarle

=== Country Music Association ===
- Entertainer of the Year — Vince Gill
- Song of the Year — "I Still Believe in You", Vince Gill and John Barlow Jarvis (Performer: Vince Gill)
- Single of the Year — "Chattahoochee", Alan Jackson
- Album of the Year — I Still Believe in You, Vince Gill
- Male Vocalist of the Year — Vince Gill
- Female Vocalist of the Year — Mary Chapin Carpenter
- Vocal Duo of the Year — Brooks & Dunn
- Vocal Group of the Year — Diamond Rio
- Horizon Award — Mark Chesnutt
- Music Video of the Year — "Chattahoochee", Alan Jackson (Director: Martin Kahan)
- Vocal Event of the Year — "I Don't Need Your Rockin' Chair", George Jones (featuring Clint Black, Garth Brooks, T. Graham Brown, Mark Chesnutt, Joe Diffie, Vince Gill, Alan Jackson, Patty Loveless, Pam Tillis and Travis Tritt)
- Musician of the Year — Mark O'Connor

== Other links ==
- Country Music Association
- Inductees of the Country Music Hall of Fame
