= Best 20 of the Last 20: The Greatest Hits =

Compilation album by Charlie Major
- Released: September 10, 2013
- Genre: Country
- Length: 1:25:58
- Label: MDM Recordings

Charlie Major chronology
On the Evening Side (2011)	Best 20 of the Last 20: The Greatest Hits (2013)	More of the Best: Greatest Hits 2 (2018)

Singles from Best 20 of the Last 20: The Greatest Hits
- 1. "A Night to Remember" Released: June 2013; 2. "Friday Nights and You" Released: November 2013

Best 20 of the Last 20: The Greatest Hits is a compilation album by Canadian country music artist Charlie Major. It was released on September 10, 2013 via MDM Recordings. The package includes two new songs, "A Night to Remember" and "Friday Nights and You".

== Track listing ==
Disc one
No.	Title	Length
1.	"I'm Gonna Drive You Out of My Mind"	4:07
2.	"It Can't Happen to Me"	4:01
3.	"The Other Side"	3:07
4.	"(I Do It) For the Money"	3:24
5.	"Tell Me Something I Don't Know"	4:07
6.	"I'm Feeling Kind of Lucky Tonight"	3:40
7.	"Some Days Are Better"	4:10
8.	"Right Here, Right Now"	4:21
9.	"One True Love"	3:49
10.	"Side by Side"	3:45
11.	"When You're Good, You're Good"	3:43

Disc two
No.	Title	Length
1.	"You'd Better Go"	4:06
2.	"My Brother and Me"	4:24
3.	"Backroads"	4:20
4.	"Better World"	3:57
5.	"That's When I Feel Loved"	4:09
6.	"Young at Heart"	3:55
7.	"Through God's Eyes"	3:51
8.	"Keep On Living"	3:46
9.	"Hold Me"	4:08
10.	"A Night to Remember"	3:37
11.	"Friday Nights and You"	3:31
