= 1994 in country music =

This is a list of notable events in country music that took place in the year 1994.

== Events ==
- January 8 — Star, Mississippi, native Faith Hill hits paydirt with her first single release, "Wild One". The song spends four weeks atop the Billboard magazine Hot Country Singles & Tracks chart, the longest for a debut release by a female artist since Connie Smith's debut "Once a Day" in 1964.
- January 30 — Clint Black, Wynonna Judd, Travis Tritt and Tanya Tucker perform the halftime show (billed as "Rockin' Country Sunday") at Super Bowl XXVIII. The finale featured a special appearance by Naomi Judd, who joined Wynonna in performing The Judds' single "Love Can Build a Bridge" (their first major appearance together since their "Farewell Tour" of 1991), to which everyone eventually joined in.
- March – Tim McGraw's first major hit, "Indian Outlaw," causes considerable controversy due to lyrics about Native Americans, and the single is boycotted at a handful of stations. Nevertheless, the song's notoriety helps spur its popularity and allows it to become just the second major crossover hit in 10 years, reaching No. 15 on the Billboard magazine Hot 100 singles chart (in addition to its No. 8 peak on the Hot Country Singles & Tracks chart); the song will also jumpstart McGraw's fledgling career, which had gotten off to a less-than-stellar start a year earlier.

Incidentally, McGraw's first taste of success comes at approximately the same time as that of his future wife — Faith Hill.

- April 12 — The premiere issue of Country Weekly magazine hits the store shelves. Garth Brooks graces the cover of the first issue.
- May 9 — Newcomer artist John Berry falls unconscious during a performance and is rushed to a hospital in Atlanta, where an operation is performed to remove a cyst found in the third ventricle of his brain.
- October 1 — CMT adds six new music video programs to its schedule: Big Ticket, Signature Series, Jammin' Country, Saturday Nite Dance Ranch, Delivery Room and Top 12 Countdown; all six programs would be cancelled by 2001.

== Top hits of the year ==
=== Singles released by American artists ===
US	CAN	Single	Artist	Reference
4	1	Addicted to a Dollar	Doug Stone	
11	8	Baby Likes to Rock It	The Tractors	
1	1	Be My Baby Tonight	John Michael Montgomery	
2	2	Before You Kill Us All	Randy Travis	
1	4	The Big One	George Strait	
4	2	The Boys and Me	Sawyer Brown	
17	25	The Call of the Wild	Aaron Tippin	
2	1	Callin' Baton Rouge	Garth Brooks	
13	6	The Cheap Seats	Alabama	
5	11	The City Put the Country Back in Me	Neal McCoy	
9	7	Daddy Never Was the Cadillac Kind	Confederate Railroad	
1	1	Don't Take the Girl	Tim McGraw	
2	3	Down on the Farm	Tim McGraw	
1	1	Dreaming with My Eyes Open	Clay Walker	
20	8	Elvis and Andy	Confederate Railroad	
2	3	Every Once in a While	BlackHawk	
2	5	Fast as You	Dwight Yoakam	
1	1	Foolish Pride	Travis Tritt	
10	9	Girls with Guitars	Wynonna Judd	
1	1	A Good Run of Bad Luck	Clint Black	
11	29	Goodbye Says It All	BlackHawk	
4	5	Half the Man	Clint Black	
4	17	Hangin' In	Tanya Tucker	
5	20	Hard to Say	Sawyer Brown	
2	6	He Thinks He'll Keep Her	Mary Chapin Carpenter	
5	2	Hey Cinderella	Suzy Bogguss	
3	19	How Can I Help You Say Goodbye	Patty Loveless	
3	9	I Can't Reach Her Anymore	Sammy Kershaw	
1	1	I Just Wanted You to Know	Mark Chesnutt	
50	20	I Love You 'Cause I Want To	Carlene Carter	
2	3	I Never Knew Love	Doug Stone	
2	5	I See It Now	Tracy Lawrence	
9	8	I Sure Can Smell the Rain	BlackHawk	
1	1	I Swear	John Michael Montgomery	
2	2	I Take My Chances	Mary Chapin Carpenter	
3	12	I Try to Think About Elvis	Patty Loveless	
3	4	I Want to Be Loved Like That	Shenandoah	
4	21	I Wish I Could Have Been There	John Anderson	
3	3	I'd Like to Have That One Back	George Strait	
3	2	I'm Holding My Own	Lee Roy Parnell	
3	19	I've Got It Made	John Anderson	
1	1	If Bubba Can Dance (I Can Too)	Shenandoah	
1	1	If I Could Make a Living	Clay Walker	
26	12	If It Wasn't for Her I Wouldn't Have You	Daron Norwood	
1	1	If the Good Die Young	Tracy Lawrence	
1	2	If You've Got Love	John Michael Montgomery	
19	10	In My Own Backyard	Joe Diffie	
12	14	Independence Day	Martina McBride	
8	24	Indian Outlaw	Tim McGraw	
6	8	Is It Over Yet	Wynonna Judd	
18	—	It Won't Be Over You	Steve Wariner	
5	6	John Deere Green	Joe Diffie	
8	6	Jukebox Junkie	Ken Mellons	
5	4	Kick a Little	Little Texas	
6	8	Life #9	Martina McBride	
4	4	Lifestyles of the Not So Rich and Famous	Tracy Byrd	
2	25	A Little Less Talk and a Lot More Action	Toby Keith	
2	7	Little Rock	Collin Raye	
1	1	Live Until I Die	Clay Walker	
1	1	Livin' on Love	Alan Jackson	
2	6	Love a Little Stronger	Diamond Rio	
8	9	Lovebug	George Strait	
4	2	The Man in Love with You	George Strait	
8	5	Man of My Word	Collin Raye	
6	4	More Love	Doug Stone	
1	2	My Love	Little Texas	
2	3	National Working Woman's Holiday	Sammy Kershaw	
1	1	No Doubt About It	Neal McCoy	
13	8	Nobody's Gonna Rain on Our Parade	Kathy Mattea	
5	22	Now I Know	Lari White	
18	16	O What a Thrill	The Mavericks	
7	14	One Night a Day	Garth Brooks	
1	9	Pickup Man	Joe Diffie	
1	1	Piece of My Heart	Faith Hill	
22	4	Pocket of a Clown	Dwight Yoakam	
7	5	Renegades, Rebels and Rogues	Tracy Lawrence	
2	5	Rock Bottom	Wynonna Judd	
2	1	Rock My World (Little Country Girl)	Brooks & Dunn	
4	2	Rope the Moon	John Michael Montgomery	
21	20	Sawmill Road	Diamond Rio	
3	11	She Can't Say I Didn't Cry	Rick Trevino	
6	7	She Dreams	Mark Chesnutt	
15	11	She Thinks His Name Was John	Reba McEntire	
4	4	She'd Give Anything	Boy Howdy	
1	1	She's Not the Cheatin' Kind	Brooks & Dunn	
1	5	Shut Up and Kiss Me	Mary Chapin Carpenter	
5	9	Spilled Perfume	Pam Tillis	
3	3	Standing Outside the Fire	Garth Brooks	
2	2	State of Mind	Clint Black	
14	13	Stop on a Dime	Little Texas	
1	1	Summertime Blues	Alan Jackson	
7	3	T.L.C. A.S.A.P.	Alabama	
21	12	Take It Easy	Travis Tritt	
2	12	Take Me as I Am	Faith Hill	
17	21	Take These Chains from My Heart	Lee Roy Parnell	
22	17	Ten Feet Tall and Bulletproof	Travis Tritt	
1	3	That Ain't No Way to Go	Brooks & Dunn	
10	23	That's My Baby	Lari White	
6	18	That's My Story	Collin Raye	
20	18	There Goes My Heart	The Mavericks	
7	15	They Asked About You	Reba McEntire	
2	3	They Don't Make 'Em Like That Anymore	Boy Howdy	
2	1	Thinkin' Problem	David Ball	
2	10	Third Rate Romance	Sammy Kershaw	
1	1	Third Rock from the Sun	Joe Diffie	
20	17	(Tonight We Just Might) Fall in Love Again	Hal Ketchum	
14	4	Try Not to Look So Pretty	Dwight Yoakam	
1	1	Tryin' to Get Over You	Vince Gill	
4	3	Untanglin' My Mind	Clint Black	
3	16	Walking Away a Winner	Kathy Mattea	
4	8	Watermelon Crawl	Tracy Byrd	
6	7	We Can't Love Like This Anymore	Alabama	
11	16	We Don't Have to Do This	Tanya Tucker	
9	6	We Just Disagree	Billy Dean	
25	6	What a Crying Shame	The Mavericks	
2	1	What the Cowgirls Do	Vince Gill	
5	2	What's in It for Me	John Berry	
3	5	When Love Finds You	Vince Gill	
7	6	When the Thought of You Catches Up with Me	David Ball	
2	13	When You Walk in the Room	Pam Tillis	
2	2	Whenever You Come Around	Vince Gill	
11	6	Where Do I Fit in the Picture	Clay Walker	
20	9	Where Was I	Ricky Van Shelton	
1	1	Whisper My Name	Randy Travis	
4	11	(Who Says) You Can't Have It All	Alan Jackson	
1	1	Who's That Man	Toby Keith	
5	4	Why Haven't I Heard from You	Reba McEntire	
1	1	Wild One	Faith Hill	
1	1	Wink	Neal McCoy	
2	17	Wish I Didn't Know Now	Toby Keith	
21	14	Woman, Sensuous Woman	Mark Chesnutt	
12	14	Words by Heart	Billy Ray Cyrus	
1	1	XXX's and OOO's (An American Girl)	Trisha Yearwood	
20	14	You Just Watch Me	Tanya Tucker	
6	43	You Will	Patty Loveless	
1	1	Your Love Amazes Me	John Berry	

=== Singles released by Canadian artists ===
US	CAN	Single	Artist	Reference
—	18	5 Days in May	Blue Rodeo	
—	9	Alcohol in the Bloodstream	Ian Tyson	
—	18	Almost Like You Cared	Cassandra Vasik	
—	6	Baby Don't Cry	One Horse Blue	
—	13	By Heart	Joel Feeney	
—	18	Circle of Love	Joan Kennedy	
—	10	Country in the City	Don Neilson	
—	10	Dynamite	Desert Dolphins	
—	14	Everything Money Can Buy	One Horse Blue	
—	11	Everything to Me	Joel Feeney	
52	12	Give Me a Ring Sometime	Lisa Brokop	
—	1	Guitar Talk	Michelle Wright	
—	12	Here We Go Again	Patricia Conroy	
—	15	Hillbilly Jane	Straight Clean & Simple	
—	5	Honest Man	George Fox	
—	17	If I'm Only Good for One Thing	Larry Mercey	
—	1	It Can't Happen to Me	Charlie Major	
—	4	Louisiette	Prairie Oyster	
—	10	Love's Looking for Me	One Horse Blue	
—	13	Man of a Thousand Songs	Ron Hynes	
—	5	No Hasta La Vista Tonight	George Fox	
—	10	No Kathleen	Ron Hynes	
—	1	Nobody Gets Too Much Love	Charlie Major	
—	4	North Country	The Rankin Family	
—	9	Now and Then	Michelle Wright	
57	1	One Good Man	Michelle Wright	
—	1	The Other Side	Charlie Major	
—	9	Red Hot Blues	Quartette	
—	8	River of No Return	Terry Kelly	
—	19	Rockabilly Heart	Cindy Church	
—	5	Say the Word	Joel Feeney	
—	5	Stolen Moments	Jim Witter	
—	1	Such a Lonely One	Prairie Oyster	
—	1	Somebody's Leavin'	Patricia Conroy	
—	6	Sweet Sweet Poison	Jim Witter	
—	15	Tell Me the Lie	Don Neilson	
—	10	That's What Highways Are For	The Goods	
—	10	There You Go	Prescott-Brown	
—	10	Train of Dreams	Gary Fjellgaard	
—	17	Way Beyond the Blue	Anita Perras	
—	7	The Wayward Wind	Anne Murray	
—	4	Wear and Tear on My Heart	George Fox	

== Top new album releases ==
US	CAN	Album	Artist	Record label
3	7	8 Seconds (soundtrack)	Various Artists	MCA Nashville
	10	Already Restless	Prescott-Brown	Epic
23	9	American Recordings	Johnny Cash	American
	2	The Best...So Far	Anne Murray	SBK/Capitol
15		BlackHawk	BlackHawk	Arista Nashville
8	5	Boomtown	Toby Keith	Mercury/PolyGram
23	11	The Bradley Barn Sessions	George Jones	MCA Nashville
13		Bryan White	Bryan White	Asylum
	1	Country Heat 4	Various Artists	RCA
	9	Eighteen Inches of Rain	Ian Tyson	Stony Plain
12		Extremes	Collin Raye	Epic
9	2	Feelin' Good Train	Sammy Kershaw	Mercury/PolyGram
29	20	Greatest Hits, Vol. 1	Doug Stone	Epic
8		Greatest Hits Vol. III	Alabama	RCA Nashville
17		Haywire	Chris LeDoux	Liberty
17	15	Healing Hands of Time	Willie Nelson	Liberty
	5	Heart of the Country '94	Various Artists	Quality
16	7	Heartsongs: Live from Home	Dolly Parton	Columbia
1	1	The Hits	Garth Brooks	Liberty
3		I See It Now	Tracy Lawrence	Atlantic
4	1	If I Could Make a Living	Clay Walker	Giant
29	19	Keith Whitley: A Tribute Album	Various Artists	BNA
10	8	Kick a Little	Little Texas	Warner Bros.
	7	Kickin' Country 2	Various Artists	Sony
1	1	Kickin' It Up	John Michael Montgomery	Atlantic
1	3	Lead On	George Strait	MCA Nashville
19		Lookin' Back at Myself	Aaron Tippin	RCA Nashville
13	7	Love a Little Stronger	Diamond Rio	Arista Nashville
28	6	Love and Luck	Marty Stuart	MCA Nashville
52	22	Mama's Hungry Eyes: A Tribute to Merle Haggard	Various Artists	Arista Nashville
4	1	Maverick (soundtrack)	Various Artists	Atlantic
37	14	Moonlight Becomes You	Willie Nelson	Justice
	1	New Country	Various Artists	Warner
13	1	No Doubt About It	Neal McCoy	Atlantic
3	11	No Ordinary Man	Tracy Byrd	MCA Nashville
1	1	Not a Moment Too Soon	Tim McGraw	Curb
6	13	Notorious	Confederate Railroad	Atlantic
8		One Emotion	Clint Black	RCA Nashville
	2	Only One Moon	Prairie Oyster	Arista
	7	Outlaws & Heroes	Various Artists	Sony
2	1	Read My Mind	Reba McEntire	MCA Nashville
	3	The Reasons Why	Michelle Wright	Arista Nashville
30	2	Red Hot + Country	Various Artists	Mercury/PolyGram
1	1	Rhythm, Country and Blues	Various Artists	MCA Nashville
23		Rick Trevino	Rick Trevino	Columbia
19		She'd Give Anything	Boy Howdy	Curb
8		Skynyrd Frynds	Various Artists	MCA Nashville
1	1	Stones in the Road	Mary Chapin Carpenter	Columbia
11	6	Storm in the Heartland	Billy Ray Cyrus	Mercury/PolyGram
34	6	Super Hits	Willie Nelson	Columbia
17		The Sweetest Gift	Trisha Yearwood	MCA Nashville
6		Sweetheart's Dance	Pam Tillis	Arista Nashville
3	3	Ten Feet Tall and Bulletproof	Travis Tritt	Warner Bros.
6	3	Thinkin' Problem	David Ball	Warner Bros.
6	9	Third Rock from the Sun	Joe Diffie	Epic
10	5	This Is Me	Randy Travis	Warner Bros.
	6	Today's Biggest Country	Various Artists	K-Tel
2	1	The Tractors	The Tractors	Arista Nashville
	3	Untamed and True	Various Artists	MCA
1	1	Waitin' on Sundown	Brooks & Dunn	Arista Nashville
12		Walking Away a Winner	Kathy Mattea	Mercury/PolyGram
	15	Wanted Man	Johnny Cash	Mercury/PolyGram
7		War Paint	Lorrie Morgan	BNA
6	4	What a Crying Shame	The Mavericks	MCA Nashville
15		What a Way to Live	Mark Chesnutt	Decca Nashville
8		When Fallen Angels Fly	Patty Loveless	Epic
2	2	When Love Finds You	Vince Gill	MCA Nashville
1	1	Who I Am	Alan Jackson	Arista Nashville
24		Wishes	Lari White	RCA Nashville
	3	You Can't Resist	Patricia Conroy	Warner

=== Other top albums ===
US	CAN	Album	Artist	Record label
60		1994	Merle Haggard	Curb
51		The Best of Chris LeDoux	Chris LeDoux	Liberty
52		Christmas Time's A-Comin'	Sammy Kershaw	Mercury/PolyGram
61		Christmas with The Judds and Alabama	The Judds & Alabama	RCA Nashville
43		Country 'Til I Die	John Anderson	BNA
56		The Cowboy Way (soundtrack)	Various Artists	Epic
48		Deep Thoughts from a Shallow Mind	Doug Supernaw	BNA
31		Every Little Word	Hal Ketchum	Curb
29		Greatest Hits	Billy Dean	Liberty
38		Greatest Hits	Suzy Bogguss	Liberty
31		In the Vicinity of the Heart	Shenandoah	Capitol Nashville
42		Ken Mellons	Ken Mellons	Epic
62		Love and Honor	Ricky Van Shelton	Columbia
51		Men'll Be Boys	Billy Dean	Liberty
39		Number One Hits	The Judds	RCA/Curb
66		Reflections	The Judds	RCA/Curb
28		Shoot for the Moon	Linda Davis	Arista Nashville
55		Simpatico	Suzy Bogguss & Chet Atkins	Liberty
35		Super Hits	Charlie Daniels	Epic
65		Super Hits	Shenandoah	Columbia
71		Super Hits	Conway Twitty	Epic
50		Today's Greatest Country	Various Artists	K-Tel
52		Today's New Country	Various Artists	K-Tel
56		Today's Number One Country	Various Artists	K-Tel
63		Waymore's Blues (Part II)	Waylon Jennings	RCA Nashville

== Births ==
- May 4 – RaeLynn, country music star of the 2010s, best known for "God Made Girls."
- November 8 – Lauren Alaina, runner-up of the 10th season of American Idol, with follow-up successes including "Like My Mother Does."

== Hall of Fame inductees ==
=== Bluegrass Music Hall of Fame inductees ===
- Osborne Brothers
  - Bobby Osborne
  - Sonny Osborne

=== Country Music Hall of Fame inductees ===
- Merle Haggard (1937–2016)

=== Canadian Country Music Hall of Fame inductees ===
- Dick Damron
- Hank Smith

== Major awards ==
=== Grammy Awards ===
- Best Female Country Vocal Performance — "Shut Up and Kiss Me", Mary Chapin Carpenter
- Best Male Country Vocal Performance — "When Love Finds You", Vince Gill
- Best Country Performance by a Duo or Group with Vocal — "Blues for Dixie", Asleep at the Wheel and Lyle Lovett
- Best Country Collaboration with Vocals — "I Fall to Pieces", Aaron Neville and Trisha Yearwood
- Best Country Instrumental Performance — "Young Thing", Chet Atkins
- Best Country Song — "I Swear", Gary Baker (songwriter), Frank J. Myers (Performer: John Michael Montgomery)
- Best Country Album — Stones in the Road, Mary Chapin Carpenter
- Best Bluegrass Album — The Great Dobro Sessions, Various Artists (Producers: Jerry Douglas and Tut Taylor)

=== Juno Awards ===
- Country Male Vocalist of the Year — Charlie Major
- Country Female Vocalist of the Year — Michelle Wright
- Country Group or Duo of the Year — Prairie Oyster

=== Academy of Country Music ===
- Entertainer of the Year — Reba McEntire
- Song of the Year — "I Swear", Gary Baker, Frank J. Myers (Performer: John Michael Montgomery)
- Single of the Year — "I Swear", John Michael Montgomery
- Album of the Year — Not a Moment Too Soon, Tim McGraw
- Top Male Vocalist — Alan Jackson
- Top Female Vocalist — Reba McEntire
- Top Vocal Duo — Brooks & Dunn
- Top Vocal Group — The Mavericks
- Top New Male Vocalist — Tim McGraw
- Top New Female Vocalist — Chely Wright
- Top New Vocal Duo or Group — The Mavericks
- Video of the Year — "The Red Strokes" – Garth Brooks (Director: Jon Small)

=== ARIA Awards ===
(presented in Sydney on March 30, 1994)

- Best Country Album - Three Chain Road (Lee Kernaghan)

=== Canadian Country Music Association ===
- Bud Country Fans' Choice Award — Prairie Oyster
- Male Artist of the Year — Charlie Major
- Female Artist of the Year — Patricia Conroy
- Group or Duo of the Year — Prairie Oyster
- SOCAN Song of the Year — "I'm Gonna Drive You Out of My Mind", Charlie Major, Barry Brown
- Single of the Year — "I'm Gonna Drive You Out of My Mind", Charlie Major
- Album of the Year — The Other Side, Charlie Major
- Top Selling Album — In Pieces, Garth Brooks
- Video of the Year — "Stolen Moments", Jim Witter
- Vista Rising Star Award — Susan Aglukark
- Vocal Collaboration of the Year — Quartette

=== Country Music Association ===
- Entertainer of the Year — Vince Gill
- Song of the Year — "Chattahoochee", Alan Jackson and Jim McBride (Performer: Alan Jackson)
- Single of the Year — "I Swear", John Michael Montgomery
- Album of the Year — Common Thread: The Songs of the Eagles, Various Artists
- Male Vocalist of the Year — Vince Gill
- Female Vocalist of the Year — Pam Tillis
- Vocal Duo of the Year — Brooks & Dunn
- Vocal Group of the Year — Diamond Rio
- Horizon Award — John Michael Montgomery
- Music Video of the Year — "Independence Day", Martina McBride (Directors: Robert Deaton and George J. Flanigen IV)
- Vocal Event of the Year — "Does He Love You", Reba McEntire and Linda Davis
- Musician of the Year — Mark O'Connor

== Other links ==
- Country Music Association
- Inductees of the Country Music Hall of Fame
