= Here and Now (Charlie Major album) =

Compilation album by Charlie Major
- Released: October 8, 1996
- Genre: Country
- Length: 49:18
- Label: Imprint
- Producer: Steve Fishell

Charlie Major chronology
Lucky Man (1995)	Here and Now (1996)	Everything's Alright (1997)

Professional ratings
Review scores
Source	Rating
Allmusic	link

Here and Now is Canadian country music singer Charlie Major's first album released in the United States. The album features songs from Major's first two Canadian releases, The Other Side and Lucky Man.

== Track listing ==
All tracks written by Charlie Major except where noted.

1. "Someday I'm Gonna Ride in a Cadillac" - 3:40
2. "Waiting on You" - 4:00
3. "It Can't Happen to Me" - 3:58
4. "This Crazy Heart of Mine" - 4:04
5. "(I Do It) For the Money" - 3:23
6. "I Can See Forever in Your Eyes" - 3:44
7. "Tell Me Something I Don't Know" (Major, Barry Brown) - 4:06
8. "Runaway Train" - 3:49
9. "It's Lonely I Can't Stand" (Major, Brown) - 3:59
10. "Solid as a Rock" (Major, Brown) - 4:57
11. "Lucky Man" - 5:15
12. "Remember the Alamo" (Jane Bowers) - 4:23
