= List of RPM number-one country singles of 1993 =

These are the Canadian number-one country songs of 1993, per the RPM Country Tracks chart.

Issue date	Title	Artist	Source
January 16	She's Got the Rhythm (And I Got the Blues)	Alan Jackson	
January 23	Don't Let Our Love Start Slippin' Away	Vince Gill	
January 30	Somewhere Other Than the Night	Garth Brooks	
February 6	Look Heart, No Hands	Randy Travis	
February 13	Look Heart, No Hands	Randy Travis	
February 20	Too Busy Being in Love	Doug Stone	
February 27	Can I Trust You with My Heart	Travis Tritt	
March 6	Take It Back	Reba McEntire	
March 13	Tryin' to Hide a Fire in the Dark	Billy Dean	
March 20	Tryin' to Hide a Fire in the Dark	Billy Dean	
March 27	What Part of No	Lorrie Morgan	
April 3	Heartland	George Strait	
April 10	When My Ship Comes In	Clint Black	
April 17	When My Ship Comes In	Clint Black	
April 24	The Heart Won't Lie	Reba McEntire with Vince Gill	
May 1	Hard Workin' Man	Brooks & Dunn	
May 8	Hard Workin' Man	Brooks & Dunn	
May 15	She Don't Know She's Beautiful	Sammy Kershaw	
May 22	Alibis	Tracy Lawrence	
May 29	I Love the Way You Love Me	John Michael Montgomery	
June 5	I Love the Way You Love Me	John Michael Montgomery	
June 12	Ain't That Lonely Yet	Dwight Yoakam	
June 19	Tell Me Why	Wynonna	
June 26	Should've Been a Cowboy	Toby Keith	
July 3	Hometown Honeymoon	Alabama	
July 10	That Summer	Garth Brooks	
July 17	That Summer	Garth Brooks	
July 24	Money in the Bank	John Anderson	
July 31	Chattahoochee	Alan Jackson	
August 7	Chattahoochee	Alan Jackson	
August 14	A Bad Goodbye	Clint Black with Wynonna	
August 21	We'll Burn That Bridge	Brooks & Dunn	
August 28	It Sure Is Monday	Mark Chesnutt	
September 4	I'm Gonna Drive You Out of My Mind	Charlie Major	
September 11	I'm Gonna Drive You Out of My Mind	Charlie Major	
September 18	Thank God for You	Sawyer Brown	
September 25	Thank God for You	Sawyer Brown	
October 2	In the Heart of a Woman	Billy Ray Cyrus	
October 9	In the Heart of a Woman	Billy Ray Cyrus	
October 16	Ain't Going Down ('Til the Sun Comes Up)	Garth Brooks	
October 23	One More Last Chance	Vince Gill	
October 30	What's It to You	Clay Walker	
November 6	Easy Come, Easy Go	George Strait	
November 13	Does He Love You	Reba McEntire with Linda Davis	
November 20	She Used to Be Mine	Brooks & Dunn	
November 27	Reckless	Alabama	
December 4	I'm Somebody	Charlie Major	
December 11	I'm Somebody	Charlie Major	
December 18	My Baby Loves Me	Martina McBride	
December 25	My Baby Loves Me	Martina McBride	

== See also ==
- 1993 in music
- List of number-one country hits of 1993 (U.S.)
