= List of RPM number-one country singles of 1994 =

These are the Canadian number-one country songs of 1994, per the RPM Country Tracks chart.

| Issue date | Title | Artist | Source |
|---|---|---|---|
| January 10 | Guitar Talk | Michelle Wright | |
| January 17 | Wild One | Faith Hill | |
| January 24 | Wild One | Faith Hill | |
| January 31 | Live Until I Die | Clay Walker | |
| February 7 | Live Until I Die | Clay Walker | |
| February 14 | I Swear | John Michael Montgomery | |
| February 21 | I Swear | John Michael Montgomery | |
| February 28 | I Swear | John Michael Montgomery | |
| March 7 | I Just Wanted You to Know | Mark Chesnutt | |
| March 14 | Rock My World (Little Country Girl) | Brooks & Dunn | |
| March 21 | Tryin' to Get Over You | Vince Gill | |
| March 28 | No Doubt About It | Neal McCoy | |
| April 4 | Nobody Gets Too Much Love | Charlie Major | |
| April 11 | Nobody Gets Too Much Love | Charlie Major | |
| April 18 | If the Good Die Young | Tracy Lawrence | |
| April 25 | If the Good Die Young | Tracy Lawrence | |
| May 2 | Piece of My Heart | Faith Hill | |
| May 9 | A Good Run of Bad Luck | Clint Black | |
| May 16 | If Bubba Can Dance (I Can Too) | Shenandoah | |
| May 23 | Addicted to a Dollar | Doug Stone | |
| May 30 | Your Love Amazes Me | John Berry | |
| June 6 | Such a Lonely One | Prairie Oyster | |
| June 13 | Such a Lonely One | Prairie Oyster | |
| June 20 | Don't Take the Girl | Tim McGraw | |
| June 27 | Wink | Neal McCoy | |
| July 4 | Wink | Neal McCoy | |
| July 11 | Wink | Neal McCoy | |
| July 18 | Foolish Pride | Travis Tritt | |
| July 25 | Thinkin' Problem | David Ball | |
| August 1 | Summertime Blues | Alan Jackson | |
| August 8 | Summertime Blues | Alan Jackson | |
| August 15 | The Other Side | Charlie Major | |
| August 22 | The Other Side | Charlie Major | |
| August 29 | Be My Baby Tonight | John Michael Montgomery | |
| September 5 | Dreaming with My Eyes Open | Clay Walker | |
| September 12 | Whisper My Name | Randy Travis | |
| September 19 | What the Cowgirls Do | Vince Gill | |
| September 26 | XXX's and OOO's (An American Girl) | Trisha Yearwood | |
| October 3 | Third Rock from the Sun | Joe Diffie | |
| October 10 | Third Rock from the Sun | Joe Diffie | |
| October 17 | One Good Man | Michelle Wright | |
| October 24 | Who's That Man | Toby Keith | |
| October 31 | Callin' Baton Rouge | Garth Brooks | |
| November 7 | She's Not the Cheatin' Kind | Brooks & Dunn | |
| November 14 | It Can't Happen to Me | Charlie Major | |
| November 21 | It Can't Happen to Me | Charlie Major | |
| November 28 | Livin' on Love | Alan Jackson | |
| December 5 | If I Could Make a Living | Clay Walker | |
| December 12 | Somebody's Leavin' | Patricia Conroy | |
| December 19 | Somebody's Leavin' | Patricia Conroy | |

== See also ==
- 1994 in music
- List of number-one country hits of 1994 (U.S.)
