= List of Hot Country Singles & Tracks number ones of 1993 =

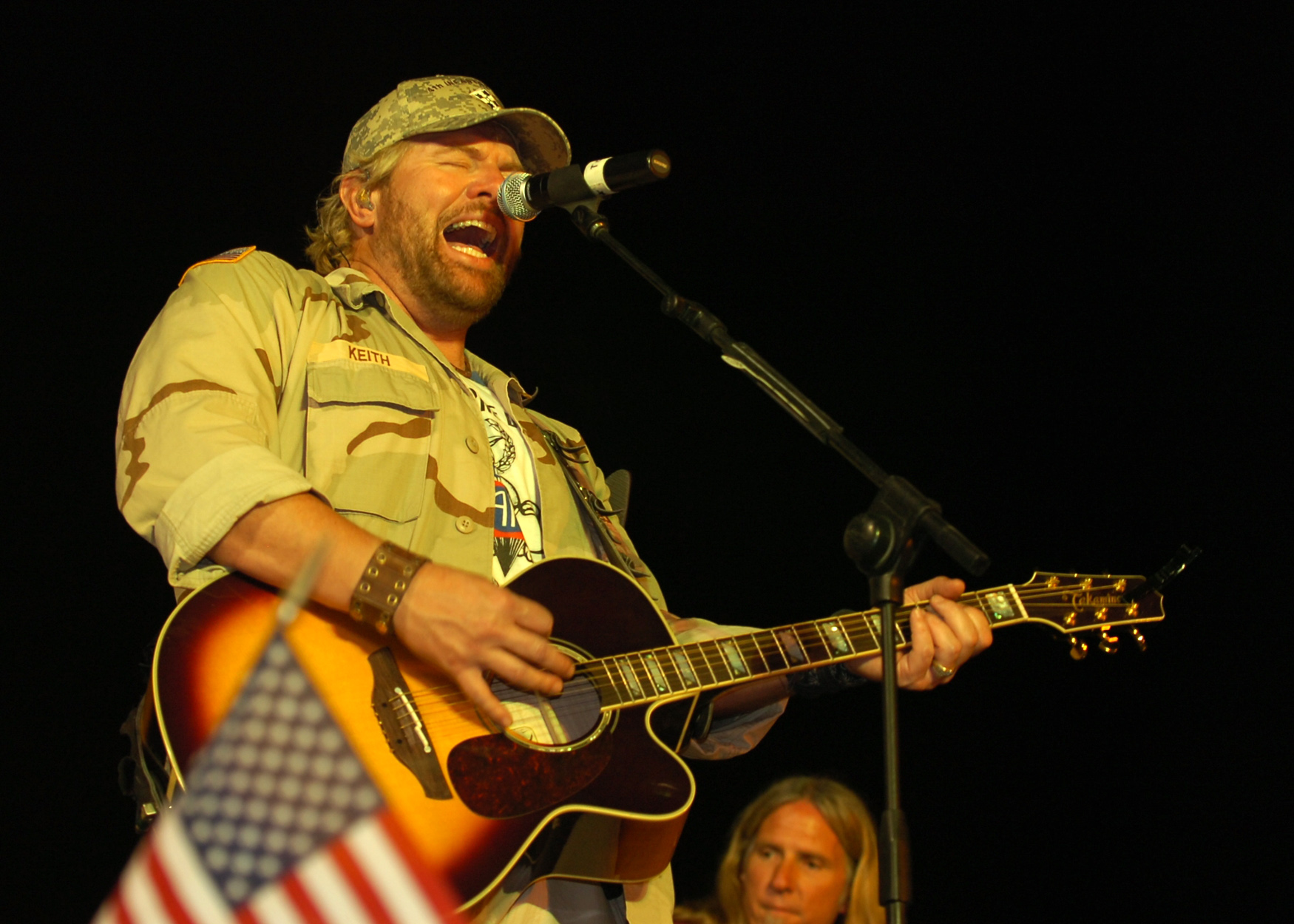
Toby Keith, one of the most successful country artists of the 1990s and 2000s, had his first number one in 1993.

Hot Country Songs is a chart that ranks the top-performing country music songs in the United States, published by Billboard magazine. In 1993, 33 different songs topped the chart, then published under the title Hot Country Singles & Tracks, in 52 issues of the magazine, based on weekly airplay data from country music radio stations compiled by Nielsen Broadcast Data Systems.

The number one song at the start of the year was "Don't Let Our Love Start Slippin' Away" by Vince Gill. It remained in the top spot until the chart dated January 16, when it was replaced by "Somewhere Other Than the Night" by Garth Brooks. Brooks also topped the chart with three other songs during the year, "That Summer", "Ain't Goin' Down ('Til the Sun Comes Up)" and "American Honky-Tonk Bar Association", giving him the most number ones of an artist in 1993. The total of five weeks which the songs spent at number one was the highest total by any act during the year. Tracy Lawrence and Vince Gill each had three number ones during the year, Gill's total including "The Heart Won't Lie", a duet with Reba McEntire. The longest unbroken run at the top was the four weeks which Alan Jackson spent at number one with "Chattahoochee".

In 1993, Toby Keith, who would go on to become one of the most successful artists in country music history, scored his first number one when "Should've Been a Cowboy" reached the top spot in June. Other artists to reach the top spot for the first time in 1993 included Sammy Kershaw with "She Don't Know She's Beautiful" in April, John Michael Montgomery with "I Love the Way You Love Me" in May, Clay Walker with "What's It to You" in October, and Doug Supernaw, whose song "I Don't Call Him Daddy" was the final number one of the year.

== Chart history ==
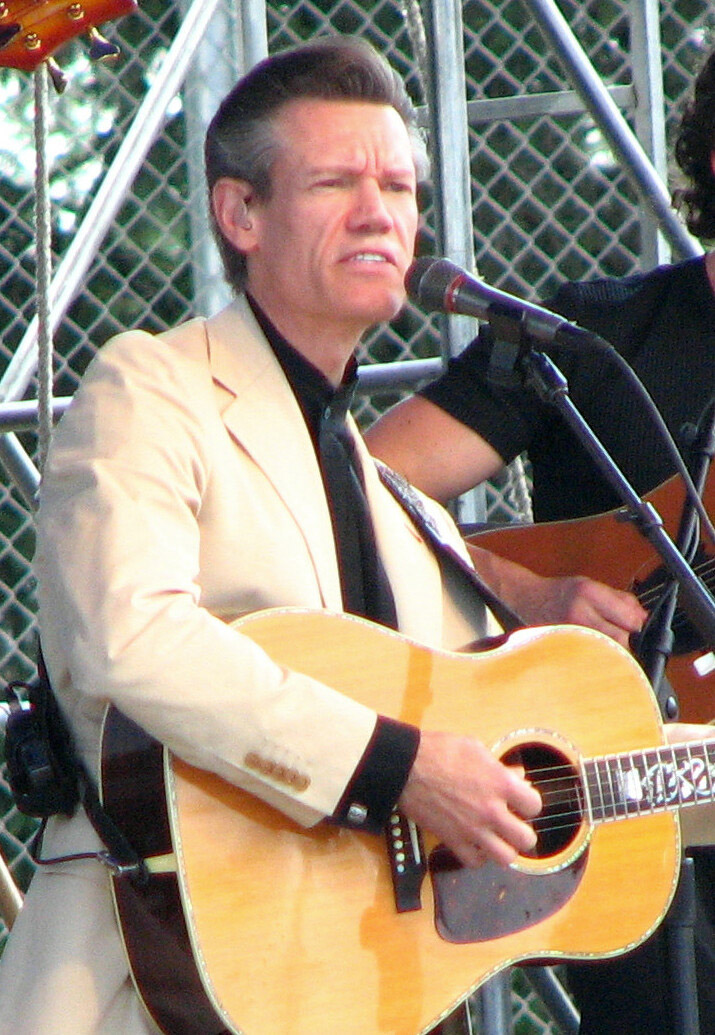
Randy Travis topped the chart for two weeks in January with "Look Heart, No Hands".

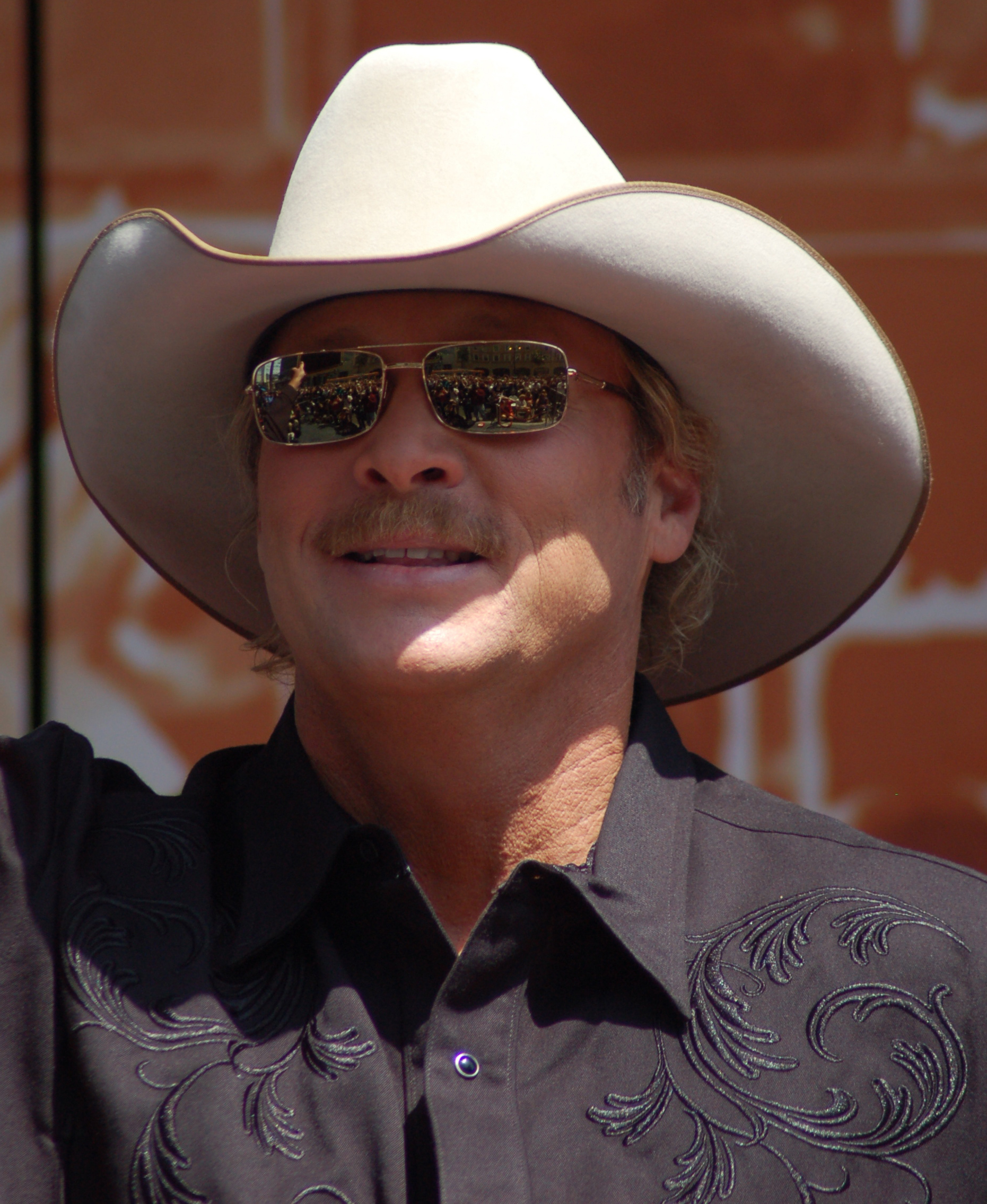
Alan Jackson's "Chattahoochee" had the longest run of the year at the top of the chart, spending four weeks at number one during July and August.

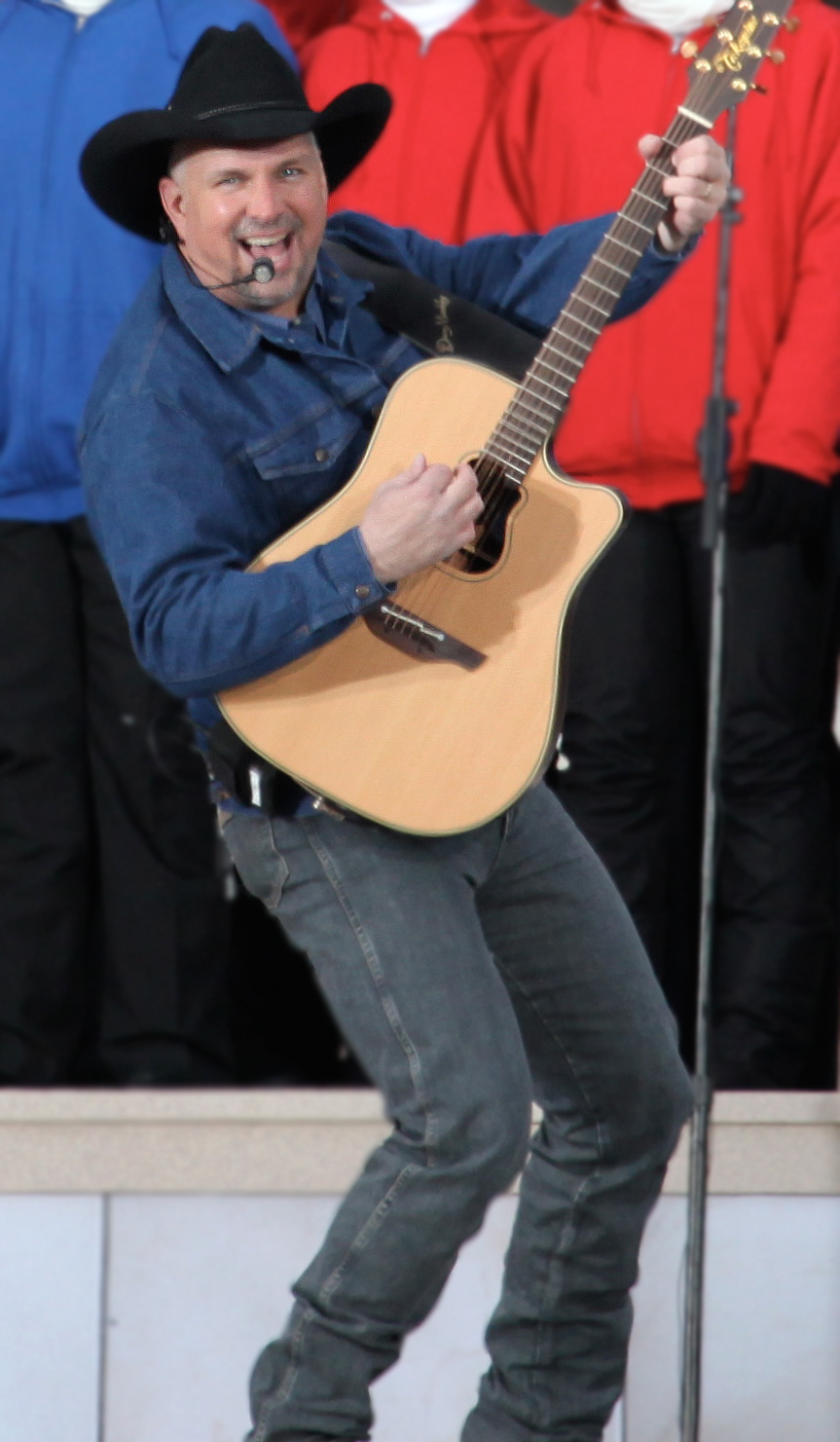
Garth Brooks had four number ones in 1993, the only artist to achieve this feat.

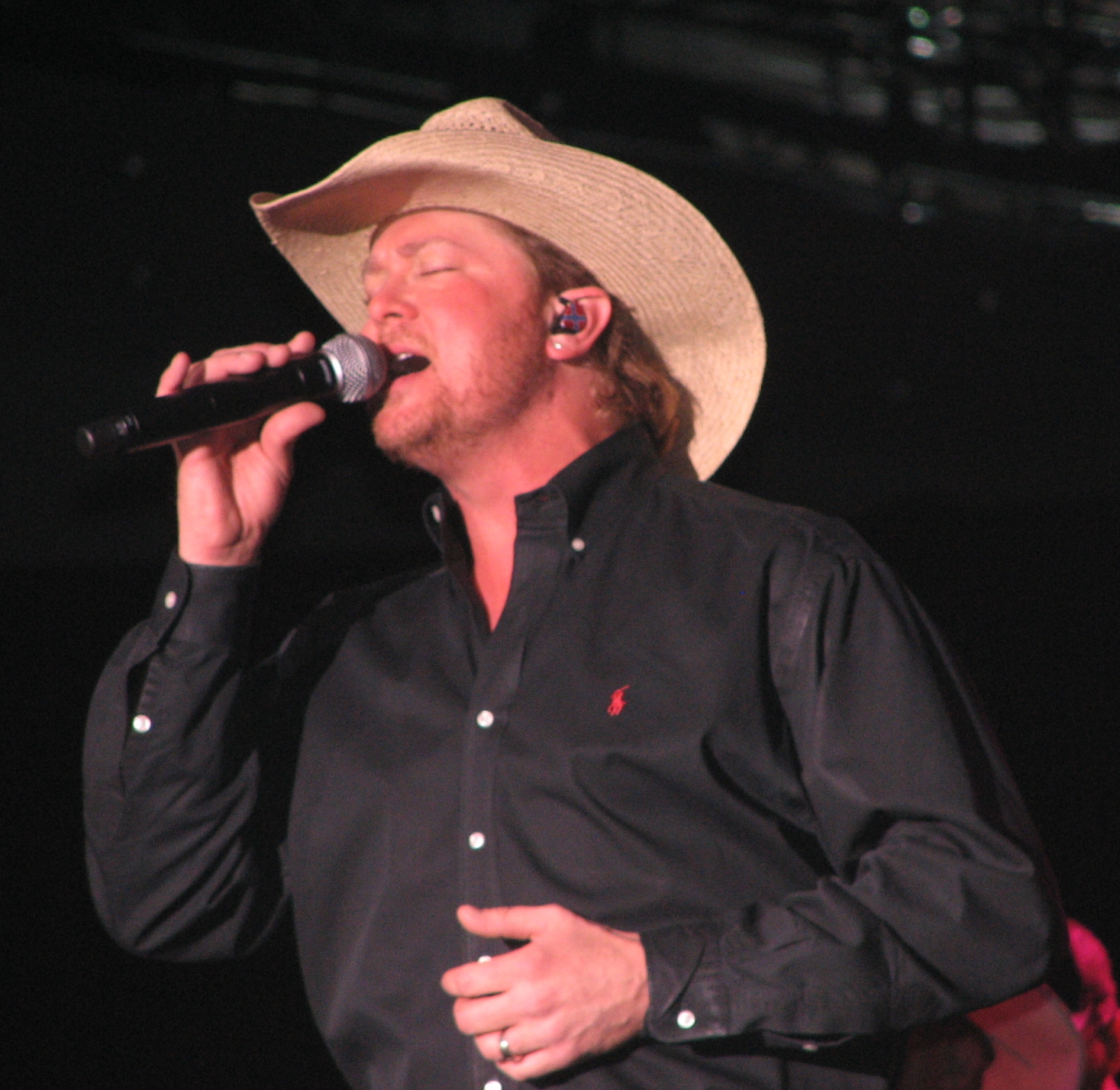
Tracy Lawrence had three number ones during the year, second only to Brooks.

Issue date	Title	Artist(s)	Ref.
January 2	"Don't Let Our Love Start Slippin' Away"	Vince Gill	
January 9	"Don't Let Our Love Start Slippin' Away"	Vince Gill	
January 16	"Somewhere Other Than the Night"	Garth Brooks	
January 23	"Look Heart, No Hands"	Randy Travis	
January 30	"Look Heart, No Hands"	Randy Travis	
February 6	"Too Busy Being in Love"	Doug Stone	
February 13	"Can I Trust You with My Heart"	Travis Tritt	
February 20	"Can I Trust You with My Heart"	Travis Tritt	
February 27	"What Part of No"	Lorrie Morgan	
March 6	"What Part of No"	Lorrie Morgan	
March 13	"What Part of No"	Lorrie Morgan	
March 20	"Heartland"	George Strait	
March 27	"When My Ship Comes In"	Clint Black	
April 3	"When My Ship Comes In"	Clint Black	
April 10	"The Heart Won't Lie"	Reba McEntire & Vince Gill	
April 17	"The Heart Won't Lie"	Reba McEntire & Vince Gill	
April 24	"She Don't Know She's Beautiful"	Sammy Kershaw	
May 1	"Alibis"	Tracy Lawrence	
May 8	"Alibis"	Tracy Lawrence	
May 15	"I Love the Way You Love Me"	John Michael Montgomery	
May 22	"I Love the Way You Love Me"	John Michael Montgomery	
May 29	"I Love the Way You Love Me"	John Michael Montgomery	
June 5	"Should've Been a Cowboy"	Toby Keith	
June 12	"Should've Been a Cowboy"	Toby Keith	
June 19	"Blame It on Your Heart"	Patty Loveless	
June 26	"Blame It on Your Heart"	Patty Loveless	
July 3	"That Summer"	Garth Brooks	
July 10	"Money in the Bank"	John Anderson	
July 17	"Chattahoochee"	Alan Jackson	
July 24	"Chattahoochee"	Alan Jackson	
July 31	"Chattahoochee"	Alan Jackson	
August 7	"Chattahoochee"	Alan Jackson	
August 14	"It Sure Is Monday"	Mark Chesnutt	
August 21	"Why Didn't I Think of That"	Doug Stone	
August 28	"Can't Break It to My Heart"	Tracy Lawrence	
September 4	"Thank God for You"	Sawyer Brown	
September 11	"Thank God for You"	Sawyer Brown	
September 18	"Ain't Goin' Down ('Til the Sun Comes Up)"	Garth Brooks	
September 25	"Holdin' Heaven"	Tracy Byrd	
October 2	"Ain't Goin' Down ('Til the Sun Comes Up)"	Garth Brooks	
October 9	"One More Last Chance"	Vince Gill	
October 16	"What's It to You"	Clay Walker	
October 23	"Easy Come, Easy Go"	George Strait	
October 30	"Easy Come, Easy Go"	George Strait	
November 6	"Does He Love You"	Reba McEntire with Linda Davis	
November 13	"She Used to Be Mine"	Brooks & Dunn	
November 20	"Almost Goodbye"	Mark Chesnutt	
November 27	"Reckless"	Alabama	
December 4	"American Honky-Tonk Bar Association"	Garth Brooks	
December 11	"My Second Home"	Tracy Lawrence	
December 18	"I Don't Call Him Daddy"	Doug Supernaw	
December 25	"I Don't Call Him Daddy"	Doug Supernaw	

== See also ==
- 1993 in music
- List of artists who reached number one on the U.S. country chart
