= Cheap Seats =

Cheap Seats or The Cheap Seats may refer to:

== Music ==
- Cheap Seats (album), by Alabama, 1993
- "Cheap Seats" (song), by Dallas Smith, 2014
- "Cheap Seats", a song by Illy featuring Waax from the 2020 album The Space Between
- "The Cheap Seats" (song), by Alabama, 1994

== Television ==
- Cheap Seats (TV series), an American TV program
- The Cheap Seats, Australian TV series

== See also ==
- "Welcome to the Cheap Seats", a 1991 song by the Wonder Stuff
- What We Saw from the Cheap Seats, a 2012 studio album by Regina Spektor
- Nosebleed section, the seats of a public area that are highest and furthest from the activity
