= Angels Among Us =

Single by Alabama

from the album Cheap Seats
- B-side: "Santa Claus (I Still Believe in You)"
- Released: December 1993
- Genre: Christian country
- Length: 4:09
- Label: RCA Nashville #62643
- Songwriters: Don Goodman; Becky Hobbs
- Producer: Teddy Gentry

Alabama singles chronology
"T.L.C. A.S.A.P." (1993)	"Angels Among Us" (1993)	"The Cheap Seats" (1994)

"Angels Among Us" is a song written by Don Goodman and Becky Hobbs and recorded by the American country music band Alabama. The song was released in December 1993 as a Christmas single from the band's 1993 album Cheap Seats. It charted twice on the Hot Country Songs charts. The song features backing vocals from the Sanctuary Choir and Young Musicians Choir of the First Baptist Church of Fort Payne, Alabama. Hobbs also recorded the song on her album The Boots I Came to Town In.

Alabama lead singer Randy Owen has said that the band received "hundreds of letters from all over the world saying that the song was a blessing." Owen performed the song at the funeral of Dale Earnhardt, Sr. in 2001, with whom he shared a personal friendship. A live recording of the song is included on Angels Among Us: Hymns and Gospel Favorites, released in 2014.

== Background and composition ==
According to songwriter Becky Hobbs, she experienced a two premonitions in the winter of 1985–1986 that she might not experience her next birthday. Soon after, Hobbs and her bandmates narrowly missed being hit by an 18-wheel semi truck that ran a green light while on the ride home from a live show. Hobbs was convinced that divine intervention spared her life and those of her bandmates and drew from the event to begin writing a new song. After a few years working on "Angels Among Us," she recruited songwriter Don Goodman to help her finish the song.

== Critical reception ==
Tom Roland of New Country magazine wrote that "even when the members of the band get schmaltzy with the kiddie chorus[…]they stop short of going overboard."

== Cover versions ==
The song's co-writer, Becky Hobbs, included the song on her 1994 album The Boots I Came to Town In.

On December 24, 2012, singer and actress Demi Lovato released a cover of the song to support the victims of the Sandy Hook Elementary School shooting.

On December 5, 2017, country singers Scotty McCreery, Carly Pearce, Sara Evans, Lucy Hale, Tegan Marie, RaeLynn, Jillian Jacqueline, Brennley Brown, CB30 and Temecula Road, all performed the cover to support the St. Jude Children's Research Hospital.

Kristin Chenoweth sang the song with The Tabernacle Choir at Temple Square in a 2018 Christmas concert.

Chris Rupp released a version on his 2018 A New Day: A Cappella, Vol II featuring Tim Foust from Home Free

== Chart performance ==
"Angels Among Us" debuted on the Hot Country Songs charts dated for the week ending December 25, 1993. The song spent six weeks on the charts and peaked at number 51 in January 1994. On the chart dated for the week ending December 31, 1994, it re-entered and went on to peak at number 28 in January 1995. Despite being charted during the holiday season, it remains one of the group's best-known songs, due to its inspirational content as well as its inclusion at funerals and in tribute videos.

Chart (1993–1994)	Peak position
U.S. Billboard Hot Country Singles & Tracks	51
Chart (1994–1995)	Peak position
U.S. Billboard Hot Country Singles & Tracks	28
Chart (1996)	Peak position
U.S. Billboard Bubbling Under Hot 100	22

== Certifications ==
Certifications for Angels Among Us
Region	Certification	Certified units/sales
United States (RIAA)	Gold	500,000^{‡}
^{‡} Sales+streaming figures based on certification alone.
