= Lucky Man (Charlie Major album) =

Studio album by Charlie Major
- Released: September 29, 1995
- Genre: Country
- Length: 45:20
- Label: Arista
- Producer: Steve Fishell

Charlie Major chronology
The Other Side (1993)	Lucky Man (1995)	Here and Now (1996)

Professional ratings
Review scores
Source	Rating
AllMusic	3/5 stars
Calgary Herald	4/5 stars

Lucky Man is the second album by the country music singer Charlie Major, released in 1995. Three of its five singles went to No. 1 on the RPM Country chart. It was certified platinum in Canada for sales of 100,000 copies.

== Critical reception ==
The Calgary Herald wrote that "Lucky Man isn't full of tunes that sound like they fell off some Nashville assembly line ... The points of view are individualistic rather than formulaic and Major's lyrical empathy definitely leans toward ... everyday people."

== Track listing ==
All tracks written by Charlie Major except where noted.

1. "Someday I'm Gonna Ride in a Cadillac" – 3:40
2. "Waiting on You" – 4:00
3. "Runaway Train" – 3:49
4. "This Crazy Heart of Mine" – 4:04
5. "(I Do It) For the Money" – 3:23
6. "I Can See Forever in Your Eyes" – 3:44
7. "Tell Me Something I Don't Know" (Major, Barry Brown) – 4:06
8. "It's Lonely I Can't Stand" (Major, Brown) – 3:59
9. "Solid as a Rock" (Major, Brown) – 4:57
10. "Lucky Man" – 5:15
11. "Remember the Alamo" (Jane Bowers) – 4:23

== Chart performance ==
Chart (1995)	Peak position
Canadian RPM Country Albums	4
Canadian RPM Top Albums	49
