= On the Evening Side =

Studio album by Charlie Major
- Released: June 21, 2011
- Genre: Country
- Length: 39:32
- Label: EMI

Charlie Major chronology
Greatest Hits (2007)	On the Evening Side (2011)	Best 20 of the Last 20: The Greatest Hits (2013)

Singles from On the Evening Side
- 1. "Through God's Eyes" Released: May 2, 2011; 2. "Keep On Living" Released: September 5, 2011; 3. "My Lover Now" Released: April 2, 2012; 4. "Hold Me" Released: January 2013

On the Evening Side is the eighth studio album by Canadian country music artist Charlie Major. It was released on June 21, 2011, via EMI Music Canada.

== Track listing ==
No.	Title	Length
1.	"Through God's Eyes"	3:51
2.	"I'm Gonna Miss This World"	4:34
3.	"Still Running"	3:49
4.	"Hold Me"	4:04
5.	"My Lover Now"	3:56
6.	"Keep an Eye Out for Me"	4:28
7.	"Wherever You Are"	3:52
8.	"Slipping Away"	4:05
9.	"Keep On Living"	3:47
10.	"On the Evening Side"	3:06
