= Life's a Dance =

Studio album by John Michael Montgomery
- Released: October 13, 1992
- Studio: Masterfonics, Quad Studios, Scruggs Sound Studio and MasterMix (Nashville, Tennessee)
- Genre: Country
- Length: 32:22
- Label: Atlantic
- Producer: Doug Johnson (tracks 1–5, 8) Wyatt Easterling (tracks 6, 7, 9, 10)

John Michael Montgomery chronology
Life's a Dance (1992)	Kickin' It Up (1994)

Singles from Life's a Dance
- 1. "Life's a Dance" Released: September 21, 1992; 2. "I Love the Way You Love Me" Released: March 1, 1993; 3. "Beer and Bones" Released: July 10, 1993

Professional ratings
Review scores
Source	Rating
AllMusic	2.5/5 stars
Entertainment Weekly	D

Life's a Dance is the debut studio album by American country music singer John Michael Montgomery, released on October 13, 1992, by Atlantic Records. It features the singles "Life's a Dance", "Beer and Bones" and "I Love the Way You Love Me", which peaked at Nos. 4, 21, and 1, respectively, on the Billboard country charts between 1992 and 1993. The album has been certified 3× Platinum by the RIAA for shipments of three million copies in the United States.

"Takin' Off the Edge" was later recorded by Kevin Denney on his 2002 self-titled debut album. "Dream On Texas Ladies" was originally recorded by Rex Allen Jr. on his 1984 album On the Move and had a Top 20 hit with this song.

== Track listing ==
No.	Title	Writer(s)	Length
1.	"Beer and Bones"	Sanger D. Shafer, Lonnie Williams	3:38
2.	"Life's a Dance"	Allen Shamblin, Steve Seskin	3:09
3.	"When Your Baby Ain't Around"	Stan Munsey, Bob Alan	3:15
4.	"Line on Love"	David Wills, Rick West, James Dean Hicks	2:37
5.	"I Love the Way You Love Me"	Victoria Shaw, Chuck Cannon	4:02
6.	"Taking Off the Edge"	Larry Cordle, Larry Shell	3:15
7.	"Everytime I Fall (It Breaks Her Heart)"	Johnny MacRae, Steve Clark	3:03
8.	"Dream On Texas Ladies"	Steve Dan Mills	3:10
9.	"A Great Memory"	Dean Dillon, Trey Bruce	3:22
10.	"Nickels and Dimes and Love"	MacRae, Clark	2:54

== Personnel ==
- John Michael Montgomery – lead vocals, backing vocals (1–5, 8)
- Steve Nathan – keyboards (1–5, 8)
- Clayton Ivey – keyboards (6, 7, 9, 10)
- Bobby All – acoustic guitars (1–5, 8)
- Brent Rowan – electric guitars (1–5, 8)
- Kenny Bell – acoustic guitars (6, 7, 9, 10)
- Wyatt Easterling – acoustic guitars (6, 7, 9, 10)
- Bill Hullett – electric guitars (6, 7, 9, 10)
- Ron "Snake" Reynolds – electric guitars (6, 7, 9, 10), percussion (6, 7, 9, 10)
- Tommy Spurlock – steel guitar (1–5, 8)
- Sonny Garrish – steel guitar (6, 7, 9, 10)
- Willie Weeks – bass (1–5, 8)
- Gary Lunn – bass (6, 7, 9, 10)
- Lonnie Wilson – drums (1–5, 8)
- Owen Hale – drums (6, 7, 9, 10)
- Jerry Kroon – drums (6, 7, 9, 10)
- Kirk "Jelly Roll" Johnson – harmonica (1–5, 8)
- Rob Hajacos – fiddle (1–5, 8)
- Glen Duncan – fiddle (6, 7, 9, 10)
- Michael Jones – backing vocals (1–5, 8)
- Michael Black – harmony vocals (6, 7, 9, 10)
- Dennis Wilson – harmony vocals (6, 7, 9, 10)
- Curtis Young – harmony vocals (6, 7, 9, 10)

=== Production ===
- Doug Johnson – producer (1–5, 8), engineer (1–5, 8)
- Wyatt Easterling – producer (6, 7, 9, 10)
- Ron Reynolds – engineer (6, 7, 9, 10), remixing (6, 7, 9, 10)
- Carry Summers – assistant engineer (1–5, 8)
- Julian King – assistant mix engineer (1–5, 8)
- Greg Parker – assistant engineer (6, 7, 9, 10)
- Denny Purcell – mastering at Georgetown Masters (Nashville, Tennessee)
- Debbie Zavitson – production assistant (1–5, 8)
- Virginia Team – art direction
- Jerry Joyner – design
- Mark Tucker – photography

== Charts ==
=== Weekly charts ===
Chart (1992–93)	Peak position
Canadian Country Albums (RPM)	6
US Billboard 200	27
US Top Country Albums (Billboard)	4
US Heatseekers Albums (Billboard)	2

=== Year-end charts ===
Chart (1993)	Position
US Billboard 200	76
US Top Country Albums (Billboard)	14
Chart (1994)	Position
US Top Country Albums (Billboard)	24
Chart (1995)	Position
US Top Country Albums (Billboard)	67

== Certifications ==
Region	Certification	Certified units/sales
Canada (Music Canada)	Gold	50,000^{^}
United States (RIAA)	3× Platinum	3,000,000^{^}
^{^} Shipments figures based on certification alone.
