= I'm Here (Charlie Major song) =

Single by Charlie Major

from the album The Other Side
- Released: 1994
- Genre: Country
- Length: 3:32
- Label: Arista
- Songwriters: Charlie Major; Barry Brown
- Producer: Steve Fishell

Charlie Major singles chronology
"It Can't Happen to Me" (1994)	"I'm Here" (1994)	"(I Do It) For the Money" (1995)

"I'm Here" is a single by Canadian country music artist Charlie Major. Released in 1994, it was the sixth single from Major's debut album The Other Side. The song reached #1 on the RPM Country Tracks chart in February 1995.

== Chart performance ==
Chart (1994–1995)	Peak position
Canada Country Singles (RPM)	1

=== Year-end charts ===
Chart (1995)	Position
Canada Country Tracks (RPM)	31
