= Everything's Alright (album) =

Studio album by Charlie Major
- Released: September 30, 1997
- Genre: Country
- Length: 41:34
- Label: ViK. Recordings
- Producer: Mike Poole, Charlie Major

Charlie Major chronology
Here and Now (1996)	Everything's Alright (1997)	444 (2000)

Professional ratings
Review scores
Source	Rating
Allmusic	2.5/5 stars

Everything's Alright is the fourth album released by Canadian country music singer Charlie Major. The lead single, "I'm Feeling Kind of Lucky Tonight," was a #1 on RPM's country chart.

== Track listing ==
All tracks written by Charlie Major, except "Thank the Lord for the Night Time", written by Neil Diamond.

1. "I'm Feeling Kind of Lucky Tonight" - 3:42
2. "Some Days Are Better" - 4:09
3. "You Can Trust in My Love" - 3:33
4. "Long, Long Gone" - 3:30
5. "I Keep on Driving" - 3:53
6. "Thank the Lord for the Night Time" - 3:31
7. "Heaven Is…" - 4:10
8. "St. Valentine's Day" - 4:03
9. "Alone in the Night" - 4:05
10. "Everything's Alright" - 3:02
11. "Where Does the Time Go" - 3:56

== Chart performance ==
Chart (1997)	Peak position
Canadian RPM Country Albums	11
