= Drivin' and Cryin' =

Single by Steve Wariner

from the album Drive
- B-side: "Drive"
- Released: November 13, 1993
- Genre: Country
- Length: 4:47
- Label: Arista
- Songwriters: Spike Blake, Rick Giles
- Producer: Scott Hendricks

Steve Wariner singles chronology
"If I Didn't Love You" (1993)	"Drivin' and Cryin'" (1993)	"It Won't Be Over You" (1994)

Music video
- "Drivin' and Cryin'" on YouTube

"Drivin' and Cryin'" is a song recorded by American country music artist Steve Wariner. It was released in November 1993 as the second single from the album Drive. The song reached #24 on the Billboard Hot Country Singles & Tracks chart. The song was written by Spike Blake and Rick Giles.

== Content ==
The narrator has left his significant other and is talking about letting out his pent up emotions as he is driving down an unknown highway in Texas, and is contemplating driving to either Dallas or San Antonio to distract himself.

== Music video ==
The video was directed by Deaton-Flanigen and shows Wariner along Texas State Highway 395 playing guitar with clips of him driving and in a cafe, which black and white footage of him leaving his lover. The video was filmed in Amarillo, Texas.

== Chart performance ==
Chart (1993–1994)	Peak position
Canada Country Singles (RPM)	65
US Hot Country Songs (Billboard)	24
