= You Can Trust in My Love =

Single by Charlie Major

from the album Everything's Alright
- Released: 1998
- Genre: Country
- Length: 3:33
- Label: ViK. Recordings
- Songwriter: Charlie Major
- Producers: Mike Poole; Charlie Major

Charlie Major singles chronology
"Thank the Lord for the Night Time" (1998)	"You Can Trust in My Love" (1998)	"Right Here, Right Now" (1999)

"You Can Trust in My Love" is a song recorded by Canadian country music artist Charlie Major. It was released in 1998 as the fourth single from his third studio album, Everything's Alright. It peaked at number 10 on the RPM Country Tracks chart in October 1998.

== Chart performance ==
Chart (1998)	Peak position
Canada Country Singles (RPM)	10
