= It's Lonely I Can't Stand =

Single by Charlie Major

from the album Lucky Man
- Released: 1996
- Genre: Country
- Length: 3:59
- Label: Arista
- Songwriters: Charlie Major; Barry Brown
- Producer: Steve Fishell

Charlie Major singles chronology
"Tell Me Something I Don't Know" (1995)	"It's Lonely I Can't Stand" (1996)	"Waiting on You" (1996)

"It's Lonely I Can't Stand" is a single by Canadian country music artist Charlie Major. Released in 1996, it was the third single from Major's album Lucky Man. The song reached #1 on the RPM Country Tracks chart in May 1996.

== Chart performance ==
Chart (1996)	Peak position
Canada Country Singles (RPM)	1

=== Year-end charts ===
Chart (1996)	Position
Canada Country Tracks (RPM)	18
