= I'm Feeling Kind of Lucky Tonight =

Single by Charlie Major

from the album Everything's Alright
- Released: 1997
- Genre: Country
- Length: 3:42
- Label: ViK. Recordings
- Songwriter: Charlie Major
- Producers: Mike Poole, Charlie Major

Charlie Major singles chronology
"This Crazy Heart of Mine" (1996)	"I'm Feeling Kind of Lucky Tonight" (1997)	"Some Days Are Better" (1998)

"I'm Feeling Kind of Lucky Tonight" is a single by Canadian country music artist Charlie Major. Released in 1997, it was the first single from Major's album Everything's Alright. The song reached #1 on the RPM Country Tracks chart in December 1997.

== Chart performance ==
Chart (1997)	Peak position
Canada Country Singles (RPM)	1

=== Year-end charts ===
Chart (1997)	Position
Canada Country Tracks (RPM)	60
