= Cheap Seats (album) =

1993 album by Alabama

Studio album by Alabama
- Released: October 12, 1993
- Studios: Emerald Sound and Sixteenth Avenue Sound (Nashville, Tennessee); Cook Sound Studio (Fort Payne, Alabama).
- Genre: Country
- Length: 38:36
- Label: RCA Nashville
- Producers: Alabama; Larry Michael Lee; Josh Leo

Alabama chronology
American Pride (1992)	Cheap Seats (1993)	Christmas with The Judds and Alabama (1994)

Singles from Cheap Seats
- 1. "Reckless" Released: August 30, 1993; 2. "T.L.C. A.S.A.P." Released: December 3, 1993; 3. "Angels Among Us" Released: December 1993; 4. "The Cheap Seats" Released: April 11, 1994

Cheap Seats is the fifteenth studio album by the American country music band Alabama, released in 1993 by RCA Records. It produced the singles "Reckless", "T.L.C. A.S.A.P." and the title track. Of these, "Reckless" was the band's final number one hit on the Billboard country charts until 2011's "Old Alabama", and "The Cheap Seats" was the band's first single in fourteen years to miss Top Ten of the charts. Alabama produced the album along with Josh Leo and Larry Michael Lee, except for "Angels Among Us", which bassist Teddy Gentry produced.

The album reached No. 16 on the Billboard Country Album Charts, as well as No. 76 on the Billboard 200.

== Content ==
The album produced three singles on the Billboard Hot Country Singles & Tracks (now Hot Country Songs) charts. First was "Reckless", which became the band's thirty-second number one on that chart. After it came the number seven "T.L.C. A.S.A.P.", written by Gary Baker and Frank J. Myers, who then comprised the duo Baker & Myers. The album's title track was the final single release; it was co-written by Randy Sharp and Marcus Hummon, who also played harmonica on it. With a number thirteen peak, it became the band's first single to miss the country top ten since "My Home's in Alabama" in 1980. Of the three singles from this album, only "The Cheap Seats" was made into a music video.

"Angels Among Us" was also recorded by Becky Hobbs, its co-writer, on her 1994 album The Boots I Came to Town In. Alabama's rendition entered the country charts twice from unsolicited airplay: first at number 54 in 1994, and later at number 28 in January 1995 (after "We Can't Love Like This Anymore", the first single from the band's Greatest Hits Volume 3). "Angels Among Us" also reached number 22 on the Bubbling Under Hot 100 in January 1996. "Katy Brought My Guitar Back Today" was later recorded by Rhett Akins on his 1995 first album A Thousand Memories. Al Anderson, then a member of the band NRBQ, co-wrote "A Better Word for Love", which NRBQ recorded on its 1994 album Message for the Mess Age.

== Critical reception ==
Dan Cooper gave the album three stars out of five in his Allmusic review. He called the title track "way cute" and cited "A Better Word for Love" as a "quiet, morning [sic] love song". Tom Roland gave an identical star rating in New Country magazine, citing it as an "excellent example of a band that still has a chemistry holding it together" and "[n]othing monumental here, just a good, solid Alabama album". He also cited the title track as a standout for "avoiding the now-stale Dixie tributes".

== Track listing ==
No.	Title	Writer(s)	Length
1.	"Still Goin' Strong"	Rick Bowles, Josh Leo	3:00
2.	"T.L.C. A.S.A.P."	Gary Baker, Frank J. Myers	3:33
3.	"Katy Brought My Guitar Back Today"	Mickey Cates, John Jarrard	3:09
4.	"On This Side of the Moon"	Mark Alan Springer	3:28
5.	"The Cheap Seats"	Marcus Hummon, Randy Sharp	3:53
6.	"Reckless"	Michael Clark, Jeff Stevens	3:15
7.	"That Feeling"	Greg Fowler, Teddy Gentry, Ronnie Rogers	3:21
8.	"This Love's on Me"	Jeff Cook, Rocky Lawrence	3:02
9.	"Clear Water Blues"	Fowler, Gentry, Rogers	4:05
10.	"A Better Word for Love"	Al Anderson, Gary Nicholson	3:43
11.	"Angels Among Us"	Don Goodman, Becky Hobbs	4:09

"Clear Water Blues" and "A Better Word for Love" are omitted from the cassette version.

== Personnel ==
As listed in liner notes.

Alabama

- Jeff Cook – lead guitar, fiddle, vocals
- Randy Owen – rhythm guitar, vocals
- Teddy Gentry – bass guitar (1–7, 9, 10, 11), vocals
- Mark Herndon – drums, percussion, vocals
- Lead vocals by Randy Owen on all tracks, except Teddy Gentry on "Clear Water Blues" and Jeff Cook on "This Love's on Me".

Additional musicians

- Bill Cuomo – acoustic piano, keyboards, Hammond B3 organ
- Carl Marsh – synth strings
- Mark Casstevens – acoustic guitar
- Bill Hullett – acoustic guitar
- Bernie Leadon – acoustic guitar, banjo
- Biff Watson – acoustic guitar
- Josh Leo – acoustic guitar, electric guitar
- John Willis – acoustic guitar, electric guitar, electric sitar (8), talk box guitar (9)
- Dann Huff – electric guitar
- George Marinelli – electric guitar
- Brent Rowan – electric guitar
- Sam Bush – fiddle, mandolin
- Larry Paxton – bass guitar (8)
- Craig Krampf – drums, percussion
- Jim Horn – saxophone (1)
- Jim Nelson – saxophone (8)
- Charles Rose – trombone
- Marcus Hummon – harmonica (5)
- Kirk "Jelly Roll" Johnson – harmonica (9)
- Sanctuary Choir and Young Musicians Choir of First Baptist Church, Fort Payne, Alabama – choir (11)

Production

- Alabama – producers (1–10)
- Larry Michael Lee – producer (1–10)
- Josh Leo – producer (1–10)
- Teddy Gentry – producer (11)
- Steve Marcantonio – mixing
- Jay Messina – recording (1–9)
- Jeff Giedt – recording (1–9), mix assistant
- Timothy Dobson – recording (10)
- Ed Turner – recording (11)
- Russ Martin – recording assistant (1–9)
- Darren Smith – recording assistant (1–9)
- Nick Sparks – recording assistant (1–9)
- James Geddes – additional overdub recording
- Don Cobb – editing
- Denny Purcell – mastering
- Georgetown Masters (Nashville, Tennessee) – editing and mastering location
- Joe Johnston – production coordinator
- Mary Hamilton – art direction
- Beth Middleworth – design
- Gary Kelly – illustration
- Dean Dixon – photography
- Jim "Señor" McGuire – photography
- Dale Morris & Associates – management

== Charts ==
=== Weekly charts ===
Chart (1993)	Peak position
Canadian Country Albums (RPM)	4
US Billboard 200	76
US Top Country Albums (Billboard)	16

=== Year-end charts ===
Chart (1994)	Position
US Top Country Albums (Billboard)	35

== Certifications ==
Region	Certification	Certified units/sales
United States (RIAA)	Platinum	1,000,000^{^}
^{^} Shipments figures based on certification alone.
