= Drive (Steve Wariner album) =

Studio album by Steve Wariner
- Released: July 27, 1993
- Studio: Soundshop Recording Studios and Midtown Tone & Volume (Nashville, Tennessee); The Castle (Franklin, Tennessee)
- Genre: Country
- Length: 37:23
- Label: Arista Nashville
- Producer: Scott Hendricks

Steve Wariner chronology
I Am Ready (1991)	Drive (1993)	No More Mr. Nice Guy (1996)

Singles from Drive
- 1. "If I Didn't Love You" Released: July 3, 1993; 2. "Drivin' and Cryin'" Released: November 13, 1993; 3. "It Won't Be Over You" Released: April 9, 1994; 4. "Drive" Released: August 1994

Drive is the eleventh studio album by American country music artist Steve Wariner. It was released on July 27, 1993, via Arista Nashville. The album produced four chart singles on the Billboard country charts in "If I Didn't Love You" at number 8, "Drivin' and Cryin'" at number 24, "It Won't Be over You" at number 18, and the title track at number 63.

== Critical reception ==
Patrick Davitt of The Leader-Post (Regina, Saskatchewan) rated the album 3 out of 5 stars. The reviewer felt that "It Won't Be Over You" was a "hard, bright highlight", while comparing "Drivin' and Cryin'" favorably to the Eagles, as well as the "simpler country tunes" of "(You Could Always) Come Back" and "The Same Mistake Again". He criticized the "unbearably thick and heavy choruses" of "Missing You" and "Married to a Memory", but praised "Sails" as a "pretty" song.

== Track listing ==
No.	Title	Writer(s)	Length
1.	"Drive"	Steve Wariner, Bill LaBounty	3:07
2.	"If I Didn't Love You"	Jon Vezner, Jack White	3:17
3.	"One Believer"	Walt Aldridge, Susan Longacre	3:53
4.	"It Won't Be Over You"	Trey Bruce, Thom McHugh	3:05
5.	"(You Could Always) Come Back"	Marc Beeson, Robert Byrne	3:59
6.	"Drivin' and Cryin'"	Rick Giles, Spike Blake	4:47
7.	"The Same Mistake Again"	Wariner, Carl Jackson	4:15
8.	"Missing You"	Giles, Longacre	3:25
9.	"Married to a Memory"	Dave Loggins	4:13
10.	"Sails"	Joanna Hall, John Hall	3:22

== Production ==
- Tim DuBois – executive producer
- Scott Hendricks – producer, overdub recording, mixing
- Mike Bradley – recording
- John Kunz – overdub recording, assistant engineer, production assistant
- Keith Boden – assistant engineer
- Tony Collins – assistant engineer
- Jon Dickson – assistant engineer
- Clark Hook – assistant engineer
- Mike Janas – assistant engineer
- Don Cobb – digital editing
- Denny Purcell – mastering at Georgetown Masters (Nashville, Tennessee)
- Ramona Simmons – project administrator
- Maude Gilman – art direction, design
- Susan Shacter – photography
- Linda Hill – styling, clothing
- Jean-François Bizalon – styling
- Chip Peay Entertainment – management

== Credits ==
- Steve Wariner – lead vocals, backing vocals (1, 3, 5), electric guitars (1 & 3), gut-string guitar (10)
- John Barlow Jarvis – keyboards (1, 9), acoustic piano (2–8)
- Bill Cuomo – organ (1), synthesizers (3, 5, 7–9)
- Catherine Styron – synthesizers (3)
- Mac McAnally – acoustic guitars (1–3, 5–9), backing vocals (2–6, 8)
- Brent Mason – electric 6-string guitar (2), electric 12-string guitar (2), electric guitars (3–9), acoustic guitars (4)
- Paul Franklin – pedal steel guitar (1–9), pedabro (4)
- Michael Rhodes – bass (1–9)
- Eddie Bayers – drums (1–9)
- Tom Roady – percussion (2), cymbals (2, 3), tambourine (6, 8), congas (9)
- Stuart Duncan – fiddle (2, 6)
- Grace Bahng – cello (10)
- Kristin Wilkinson – viola (10)
- David Davidson – violin (10)
- Connie Heard – violin (10)
- Edgar Meyer – string arrangements (10)
- Bill LaBounty – backing vocals (1)
- Carl Jackson – backing vocals (7)
- Harry Stinson – backing vocals (2, 4, 6, 8)
- Billy Thomas – backing vocals (6, 8)
- Dave Loggins – backing vocals (9)
- Judy Rodman – backing vocals (9)

== Chart performance ==
Chart (1993)	Peak position
U.S. Billboard Top Country Albums	51
Canadian RPM Country Albums	19
