= This Crazy Heart of Mine =

Single by Charlie Major

from the album Lucky Man
- Released: 1996
- Genre: Country
- Length: 4:04
- Label: Arista
- Songwriter: Charlie Major
- Producer: Steve Fishell

Charlie Major singles chronology
"Waiting on You" (1996)	"This Crazy Heart of Mine" (1996)	"I'm Feeling Kind of Lucky Tonight" (1997)

"This Crazy Heart of Mine" is a song recorded by Canadian country music artist Charlie Major. It was released in 1996 as the fifth single from his second studio album, Lucky Man. It peaked at number 8 on the RPM Country Tracks chart in February 1997.

== Chart performance ==
Chart (1996–1997)	Peak position
Canada Country Singles (RPM)	8

=== Year-end charts ===
Chart (1997)	Position
Canada Country Tracks (RPM)	73
