= If I Didn't Love You (Steve Wariner song) =

Single by Steve Wariner

from the album Drive
- B-side: "The Same Mistake Again"
- Released: July 3, 1993
- Genre: Country
- Length: 3:18
- Label: Arista
- Songwriters: Jon Vezner, Jack White
- Producer: Scott Hendricks

Steve Wariner singles chronology
"Like a River to the Sea" (1993)	"If I Didn't Love You" (1993)	"Drivin' and Cryin'" (1993)

"If I Didn't Love You" is a song written by Jon Vezner and Jack White, and recorded by American country music artist Steve Wariner. It was released in July 1993 as the first single from the album Drive. The song reached #8 on the Billboard Hot Country Singles & Tracks chart.

== Chart performance ==
Chart (1993)	Peak position
Canada Country Singles (RPM)	8
US Hot Country Songs (Billboard)	8

=== Year-end charts ===
Chart (1993)	Position
US Country Songs (Billboard)	62
