= Becky Hobbs =

American country singer, songwriter and pianist (born 1950)

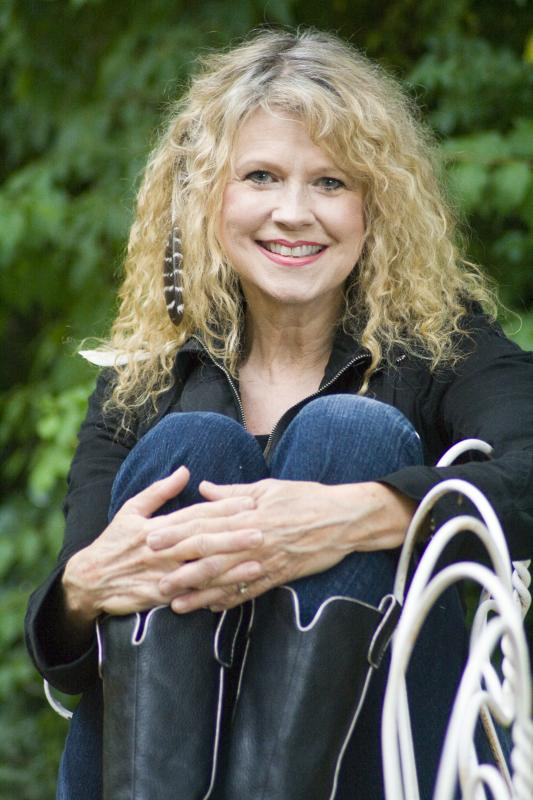
- Hobbs in 2009

Background information
- Born: January 24, 1950 (age 76)
- Origin: Bartlesville, Oklahoma, United States
- Genres: Country, Honky Tonk
- Occupation: Singer-songwriter
- Instruments: Vocals, piano
- Years active: 1971–present
- Labels: MCA, Tattoo, Liberty, MTM, RCA Nashville, Curb, Intersound, Beckaroo
- Website: http://www.beckyhobbs.com

Becky Hobbs (born Rebecca A. Hobbs, January 24, 1950) is an American country singer, songwriter, and pianist. She has recorded several studio albums and has charted multiple singles on the Billboard Hot Country Songs charts, including the 1983 top-10 hit "Let's Get Over Them Together," a duet with Moe Bandy.

Hobbs has written over 2000 songs. Besides her work as a solo artist, Hobbs has written for several country and pop acts, such as Helen Reddy, George Jones, Loretta Lynn, Shelly West, Glen Campbell, Emmylou Harris, Wanda Jackson, John Anderson, and Dame Shirley Bassey. She co-wrote two well-known songs for Alabama: "I Want to Know You Before We Make Love" (later covered by Conway Twitty in 1987) and "Angels Among Us."

Hobbs wrote the music and lyrics for the 2011 musical Nanyehi: The Story of Nancy Ward, which is based upon the life of her fifth-great-grandmother Nancy Ward.

== Life & career ==
Hobbs is a native of Bartlesville, Oklahoma, and is a citizen of the Cherokee Nation. She began playing the piano and writing her own songs when she was nine years old. Her early musical influences included Jerry Lee Lewis and big band and country music. As an adolescent, Hobbs played with two Bartlesville-based boy bands, Epicurean Time Machine and Undetermined Mud. When she was 15 years old, she started her own all-female rock band. The band, called the Four Faces of Eve, was the first all-female rock band in Oklahoma and played on the KOTV show Dance Party. Hobbs later participated in an all-girl band contest, sponsored by Tulsa, Oklahoma, radio station KAKC, that resulted in her joining a band called Sir Prize Package and playing in the Tulsa area for a few years. Later on, Hobbs was invited to join the band Swampfox in Baton Rouge, Louisiana; she was the group's sole female member. She decided to drive to Los Angeles, accompanied by bandmate Lewis Anderson, to pursue a career as a solo artist.

In California, Hobbs became acquainted with Kim Fowley, who gave her a $250 advance for her song "Paradise Is in Your Mind." Fowley also invited Hobbs to join an all-female band that became known as The Runaways, but she declined. Helen Reddy began recording Hobbs' songs in 1974, which marked Hobbs' first major recordings. "Ain't None of Your Business," a song Hobbs cowrote with Anderson, was covered by Detective on their debut album in 1977. Kiss had also recorded the song around this time, but it was not available commercially until the 45th-anniversary edition of Destroyer was released in 2021.

As a recording artist, Hobbs has had over 20 chart records. She has given concerts in over 40 countries.

Cashbox declared Hobbs as its Independent Country Music Female Artist of the Year in 1994. In 2015, Hobbs was inducted into the Oklahoma Music Hall of Fame.

Hobbs' husband, Duane Sciacqua, is also a musician, who has performed with her live.

Hobbs is a member of the Indian Women's Pocahontas Club.

=== Nanyehi ===
Hobbs grew up listening to stories about Nancy Ward, her fifth-great-grandmother who was also known as Nanyehi, a Beloved Woman and political leader of the Cherokee. In 1993, She began writing songs (including "Let There Be Peace" and "Pale Moon") to honor her ancestor, intending to record them on one of her albums.

In 2007, Hobbs performed at the Bartlesville Centennial Celebration, where she met playwright Nick Sweet. The two began discussing writing a musical based on the life of Nancy Ward. Hobbs ended up writing or co-writing each of the 18 songs in the resulting musical, Nanyehi: The Story of Nancy Ward. She later recorded these songs on her 2011 solo album Nanyehi: Beloved Woman of the Cherokee.

The musical Nanyehi: The Story of Nancy Ward premiered in Hartwell, Georgia in 2013. The musical was produced by David Webb. As of 2024, the musical has been produced and performed live in thirteen separate productions in Georgia, Oklahoma, Tennessee, and Texas. Wes Studi joined the cast of the 2024 production at Hard Rock Live Tulsa, playing the role of Attakullakulla.

Hobbs also directed and co-wrote the 2016 short film Nanyehi. The film was shot entirely within the Cherokee Nation, and featured a cast of 44 actors, most of whom are Cherokee Nation citizens. Additional co-writers included Holly Rice (who had previously shot footage of the April 2015 production of the musical in Greenville, Texas) and Nick Sweet, while Duane Sciacqua scored the film. David Webb returned to produce the film. Nanyehi was showcased at the 2018 Circle Cinema Film Festival in Tulsa, the 2019 Pocahontas Reframed Film Festival, and the 2019 Will Rogers Tribute at the Will Rogers Memorial Museum. The film was the recipient of several industry awards (including the Native American Vision Award) and was inducted into the Oklahoma Movie Hall of Fame in 2019.

== Discography ==
=== Albums ===
Year	Title	US Country	Label
1974	Becky Hobbs	—	MCA
1975	From the Heartland	—	Tattoo
1977	Everyday	—	Tattoo
1979	Becky Hobbs	—	RCA
1988	All Keyed Up^{A}	25	MTM
1994	The Boots I Came to Town In	—	Intersound
1998	From Oklahoma with Love	—	Intersound
2004	Songs from the Road of Life	—	Beckaroo
2006	Best of the Beckaroo, Vol. 1	—	Beckaroo
2011	Nanyehi: Beloved Woman of the Cherokee	—	Beckaroo

- ^{A}All Keyed Up was re-released on RCA Records in 1989 with two songs added.

=== Singles ===
Year	Single	Peak positions		Album
Year	Single	US Country	CAN Country	Album
1976	"I'm in Love Again"	—	—	—N/a
1978	"The More I Get, the More I Want"	95	—	Becky Hobbs
1979	"I Can't Say Goodbye to You"	44	—	Becky Hobbs
1979	"Just What the Doctor Ordered"	52	—	—N/a
1980	"I'm Gonna Love You Tonight (Like There's No Tomorrow)"	79	—	—N/a
1980	"I Learned All About Cheatin' from You"	87	—	—N/a
1981	"Honky Tonk Saturday Night"	84	—	—N/a
1984	"Oklahoma Heart"	46	—	—N/a
1984	"Pardon Me (Haven't We Loved Somewhere Before)"	64	—	—N/a
1984	"Wheels in Emotion"	77	—	—N/a
1985	"Hottest 'Ex' in Texas"	37	—	—N/a
1985	"You Made Me This Way"	—	—	—N/a
1988	"Jones on the Jukebox"	31	35	All Keyed Up
1988	"They Always Look Better When They're Leavin'"	43	—	All Keyed Up
1988	"Are There Any More Like You"	53	—	All Keyed Up
1989	"Do You Feel the Same Way Too?"	39	53	All Keyed Up (re-issue)
1990	"A Little Hunk of Heaven"	—	—	—N/a
1991	"Talk Back Trembling Lips"	—		—N/a
1994	"Mama's Green Eyes (And Daddy's Wild Hair)"	—	—	The Boots I Came to Town In
1994	"Pale Moon"	—	—	The Boots I Came to Town In
1998	"Country Girls"	—	—	From Oklahoma with Love
1998	"Honky Tonk Saturday Night" (re-recording)	—	—	From Oklahoma with Love
2005	"Another Man in Black"	—	—	Songs from the Road of Life
2011	"Nanyehi"	—	—	Nanyehi: Beloved Woman of the Cherokee
"—" denotes releases that did not chart

=== Singles with Moe Bandy ===
Year	Title	Chart Positions		Album
Year	Title	US Country	CAN Country	Album
1983	"Let's Get Over Them Together"	10	27	Devoted to Your Memory
1990	"Pardon Me"	—^{A}	—	Greatest Hits

Notes:

- ^{A}Did not chart on Hot Country Songs, but peaked at No. 3 on Hot Country Radio Breakouts and at No. 78 on Country Airplay.

=== Music videos ===
Year	Video	Director
1988	"Jones on the Jukebox"	
1988	"Are There Any More Like You"	
1989	"Do You Feel the Same Way Too?"	
1990	"Talk Back Trembling Lips"	Greg Crutcher
1994	"Mama's Green Eyes (And Daddy's Wild Hair)"	
1994	"Pale Moon"	Peter Lippman
1998	"Country Girls"	Chuck Shanlever
