= Beer and Bones =

Single by John Michael Montgomery

from the album Life's a Dance
- Released: July 10, 1993
- Genre: Country
- Length: 3:38
- Label: Atlantic
- Songwriters: Sanger D. Shafer, Lonnie Williams
- Producer: Doug Johnson

John Michael Montgomery singles chronology
"I Love the Way You Love Me" (1993)	"Beer and Bones" (1993)	"I Swear" (1993)

"Beer and Bones" is a song written by Sanger D. Shafer and Lonnie Williams, and recorded by American country music artist John Michael Montgomery. It was released in July 1993 as the third and final single from his 1992 debut album Life's a Dance. The song reached No. 21 on the Billboard Hot Country Singles & Tracks chart.

== Chart performance ==
Chart (1993)	Peak position
Canada Country Singles (RPM)	13
US Bubbling Under Hot 100 (Billboard)	23
US Hot Country Songs (Billboard)	21
