= Life's a Dance (song) =

Single by John Michael Montgomery

from the album Life's a Dance
- Released: September 21, 1992
- Genre: Country
- Length: 3:09
- Label: Atlantic
- Songwriters: Allen Shamblin; Steve Seskin
- Producer: Doug Johnson

John Michael Montgomery singles chronology
"Life's a Dance" (1992)	"I Love the Way You Love Me" (1993)

"Life's a Dance" is a debut song written by Allen Shamblin and Steve Seskin, and recorded by American country music singer John Michael Montgomery. It was released on September 21, 1992, as his debut single, and was served as the lead-off single and title track from his debut album Life's a Dance. It peaked at number 4 on the U.S. Hot Country Singles & Tracks (now Hot Country Songs) chart. It also peaked at number 3 on the Canadian RPM Country Tracks.

== Content ==
The song is a mid-tempo, in which the narrator gives the example of being too scared to ask a girl out when he was 14 years old. The girl ends up moving away and he never had the chance to ask her. The narrator goes on to refer to life as "a dance" and says that "you learn as you go".

== Critical reception ==
Deborah Evans Price, of Billboard magazine gave the song a mixed review, saying that Montgomery is a "fine and photogenic balladeer" but the song is "less than memorable."

== Music video ==
The music video was directed by Marc Ball and premiered in late 1992. The video was filmed in Durango, Colorado and was the first time Montgomery had ever been on a plane. In 1994, he performed the song on the PBS music program Austin City Limits during Season 19.

== Chart positions ==
"Life's a Dance" debuted at number 69 on the U.S. Billboard Hot Country Singles & Tracks for the week of October 3, 1992.

Chart (1992–1993)	Peak position
Canada Country Singles (RPM)	3
US Hot Country Songs (Billboard)	4

=== Year-end charts ===
Chart (1993)	Position
Canada Country Tracks (RPM)	65
