= Some Days Are Better =

Single by Charlie Major

from the album Everything's Alright
- Released: 1998
- Genre: Country
- Length: 4:09
- Label: ViK. Recordings
- Songwriter: Charlie Major
- Producers: Mike Poole; Charlie Major

Charlie Major singles chronology
"I'm Feeling Kind of Lucky Tonight" (1997)	"Some Days Are Better" (1998)	"Thank the Lord for the Night Time" (1998)

"Some Days Are Better" is a song recorded by Canadian country music artist Charlie Major. It was released in 1998 as the second single from his third studio album, Everything's Alright. It peaked at number four on the RPM Country Tracks chart in March 1998.

== Chart performance ==
Chart (1998)	Peak position
Canada Country Singles (RPM)	4

=== Year-end charts ===
Chart (1998)	Position
Canada Country Tracks (RPM)	31
