= It Won't Be Over You =

Single by Steve Wariner

from the album Drive
- B-side: "Missing You"
- Released: April 9, 1994
- Genre: Country
- Length: 3:05
- Label: Arista
- Songwriter(s): Trey Bruce, Thom McHugh
- Producer(s): Scott Hendricks

Steve Wariner singles chronology
"Drivin' and Cryin'" (1993)	"It Won't Be Over You" (1994)	"Drive" (1994)

"It Won't Be Over You" is a song written by Trey Bruce and Thom McHugh, and recorded by American country music artist Steve Wariner. It was released in April 1994 as the third single from the album Drive. The song reached #18 on the Billboard Hot Country Singles & Tracks chart.

== Chart performance ==
Chart (1994)	Peak position
US Hot Country Songs (Billboard)	18
