= Right Here, Right Now (Charlie Major song) =

Single by Charlie Major

from the album 444
- Released: 1999
- Genre: Country
- Length: 4:17
- Label: Dead Reckoning
- Songwriter: Charlie Major
- Producer: Harry Stinson

Charlie Major singles chronology
"You Can Trust in My Love" (1998)	"Right Here, Right Now" (1999)	"One True Love" (2000)

"Right Here, Right Now" is a song recorded by Canadian country music artist Charlie Major. It was released in 1999 as the first single from his fourth studio album, 444. It peaked at number 8 on the RPM Country Tracks chart in February 2000.

== Chart performance ==
Chart (1999–2000)	Peak position
Canada Country Singles (RPM)	8
