= Waiting on You (Charlie Major song) =

Single by Charlie Major

from the album Lucky Man
- Released: 1996
- Genre: Country
- Length: 4:00
- Label: Arista
- Songwriter: Charlie Major
- Producer: Steve Fishell

Charlie Major singles chronology
"It's Lonely I Can't Stand" (1996)	"Waiting on You" (1996)	"This Crazy Heart of Mine" (1996)

"Waiting on You" is a song recorded by Canadian country music artist Charlie Major. It was released in 1996 as the fourth single from his second studio album, Lucky Man. It peaked at number 2 on the RPM Country Tracks chart in October 1996.

== Chart performance ==
Chart (1996)	Peak position
Canada Country Singles (RPM)	2

=== Year-end charts ===
Chart (1996)	Position
Canada Country Tracks (RPM)	10
