= T.L.C. A.S.A.P. =

Single by Alabama

from the album Cheap Seats
- B-side: "That Feeling"
- Released: December 3, 1993
- Genre: Country
- Length: 3:33
- Label: RCA Nashville
- Songwriters: Gary Baker; Frank J. Myers
- Producers: Alabama; Larry Michael Lee; Josh Leo

Alabama singles chronology
"Reckless" (1993)	"T.L.C. A.S.A.P." (1993)	"Angels Among Us" (1993)

"T.L.C. A.S.A.P." is a song written by Gary Baker and Frank J. Myers, and recorded by American country music group Alabama. It was released in December 1993 as the second single from their album Cheap Seats. The song reached number 7 on the Billboard Hot Country Singles & Tracks chart in March 1994.

== Chart performance ==
Chart (1993–1994)	Peak position
Canada Country Singles (RPM)	3
US Hot Country Songs (Billboard)	7

=== Year-end charts ===
Chart (1994)	Position
Canada Country Tracks (RPM)	52
US Country Songs (Billboard)	72
