= My Second Home =

Single by Tracy Lawrence

from the album Alibis
- B-side: "Crying Ain't Dying"
- Released: September 16, 1993
- Recorded: 1992
- Genre: Country
- Length: 2:45
- Label: Atlantic 87312
- Songwriters: Tracy Lawrence; Paul Nelson; Kenny Beard
- Producer: James Stroud

Tracy Lawrence singles chronology
"Can't Break It to My Heart" (1993)	"My Second Home" (1993)	"If the Good Die Young" (1994)

"My Second Home" is a song co-written and recorded by American country music singer Tracy Lawrence. It was released on September 16, 1993, as the third single from his album, Alibis. The song reached the top of the Billboard Hot Country Singles & Tracks (now Hot Country Songs) chart and peaked at number 6 on the Canadian RPM Country Tracks chart. It was written by Lawrence with Paul Nelson and Kenny Beard.

== Content ==
"My Second Home" is an uptempo honky-tonker in which the bar that the narrator considers his "second home" becomes his only home after his wife kicks him out.

== Music video ==
The music video was directed by Marc Ball and premiered in September 1993. It is a live performance, and features cameos from future legends who, along with Lawrence, would have major success during the 1990s: Toby Keith (eating ice cream), future collaborator Tim McGraw as a vocal member, Clay Walker as a duet partner during the first chorus, and Shania Twain as a tambourine player, as well as established stars Lynn Anderson as a keyboardist, Holly Dunn as an acoustic guitar player, and John Anderson, Tanya Tucker and William Lee Golden of the Oak Ridge Boys as backup singers. (Ball directed not only most of Lawrence's videos until 2001, but also the majority of Keith's early music videos until 1997.)

== Chart positions ==
"My Second Home" debuted at number 73 on the U.S. Billboard Hot Country Singles & Tracks for the week of September 4, 1993.

Chart (1993)	Peak position
Canada Country Singles (RPM)	6
US Hot Country Songs (Billboard)	1
