= Nobody Gets Too Much Love =

Single by Charlie Major

from the album The Other Side
- Released: 1994
- Genre: Country
- Length: 3:24
- Label: Arista
- Songwriter: Charlie Major
- Producer: Steve Fishell

Charlie Major singles chronology
"I'm Somebody" (1993)	"Nobody Gets Too Much Love" (1994)	"The Other Side" (1994)

"Nobody Gets Too Much Love" is a single by Canadian country music artist Charlie Major. Released in 1994, it was the third single from Major's debut album The Other Side. The song reached #1 on the RPM Country Tracks chart in April 1994.

== Chart performance ==
Chart (1994)	Peak position
Canada Country Singles (RPM)	1

=== Year-end charts ===
Chart (1994)	Position
Canada Country Tracks (RPM)	1
