= The Cheap Seats (song) =

Single by Alabama

from the album Cheap Seats
- B-side: "This Love's on Me"
- Released: April 11, 1994
- Genre: Country
- Length: 3:54
- Label: RCA Nashville
- Songwriters: Marcus Hummon; Randy Sharp
- Producers: Alabama; Larry Michael Lee; Josh Leo

Alabama singles chronology
"T.L.C. A.S.A.P." (1993)	"The Cheap Seats" (1994)	"We Can't Love Like This Anymore" (1994)

"The Cheap Seats" is a song by American country music group Alabama, released on April 4, 1994, as the third and final single from their album Cheap Seats. "The Cheap Seats" was written by Marcus Hummon and Randy Sharp, and peaked at number 13 on the Billboard Hot Country Singles & Tracks chart in mid-1994. It also peaked at number 6 on the Canadian RPM Country Tracks.

== Content ==
The song is a reminiscence of minor league baseball in the narrator's hometown in the Midwestern United States.

== Critical reception ==
Dan Cooper of Allmusic called the song "way cute" in his review of the album. Tom Roland of New Country magazine praised the song for "avoiding the now-stale Dixie tributes" that were present in the band's other songs.

== Music video ==
The music video was directed by Deaton-Flanigen and features the band at a baseball game. It is strongly implied that Des Moines, Iowa is the "middle-sized town" in question, as it does indeed have a AAA minor league team (Iowa Cubs) and is in fact "in the middle of the Midwest". It was filmed at historic Engel Stadium in Chattanooga, Tennessee, a staged game between the Carolina Mudcats and Chattanooga Lookouts, members of the Double-A Southern League at the time. It was also filmed in the band's hometown of Fort Payne, Alabama.

== Chart performance ==
"The Cheap Seats" debuted at number 65 on the U.S. Billboard Hot Country Singles & Tracks for the week of April 16, 1994. It ended their streak of 41 straight Top 10 singles on the Hot Country Songs Chart.

Chart (1994)	Peak position
Canada Country Singles (RPM)	6
US Hot Country Songs (Billboard)	13

=== Year-end charts ===
Chart (1994)	Position
Canada Country Tracks (RPM)	77
