= Tell Me Something I Don't Know (Charlie Major song) =

Single by Charlie Major

from the album Lucky Man
- Released: 1995
- Genre: Country
- Length: 4:06
- Label: Arista
- Songwriters: Charlie Major; Barry Brown
- Producer: Steve Fishell

Charlie Major singles chronology
"(I Do It) For the Money" (1995)	"Tell Me Something I Don't Know" (1995)	"It's Lonely I Can't Stand" (1996)

"Tell Me Something I Don't Know" is a single by Canadian country music artist Charlie Major. Released in 1995, it was the second single from Major's album Lucky Man. The song reached #1 on the RPM Country Tracks chart in March 1996.

== Chart performance ==
Chart (1995–1996)	Peak position
Canada Country Singles (RPM)	1

=== Year-end charts ===
Chart (1996)	Position
Canada Country Tracks (RPM)	11
