= Can't Break It to My Heart =

Single by Tracy Lawrence

from the album Alibis
- B-side: "I Threw the Rest Away"
- Released: June 5, 1993
- Recorded: 1992
- Genre: Country
- Length: 2:53
- Label: Atlantic 87330
- Songwriters: Tracy Lawrence, Kirk Roth, Earl Clark, Elbert West
- Producer: James Stroud

Tracy Lawrence singles chronology
"Alibis" (1993)	"Can't Break It to My Heart" (1993)	"My Second Home" (1993)

"Can't Break It to My Heart" is a song by American country music singer Tracy Lawrence. It was released in June 1993 as the second single from his album, Alibis. The song reached the top of the Billboard Hot Country Songs chart and peaked at number 2 on the Canadian RPM Country Tracks chart. Lawrence wrote the song, along with Elbert West, Earl Clark and Kirk Roth.

== History ==
Lawrence said that Atlantic Records executives did not want him to record the song, because they wanted him to record more ballads similar to those of then-labelmate John Michael Montgomery. He told the blog Taste of Country in 2018 that he fought his label executives for the right to record the song, and he won.

== Music video ==
The music video was directed by Marc Ball and premiered in June 1993.

== Chart positions ==
"Can't Break It to My Heart" debuted at number 73 on the U.S. Billboard Hot Country Singles & Tracks for the week of June 5, 1993.

Chart (1993)	Peak position
Canada Country Singles (RPM)	2
US Hot Country Songs (Billboard)	1

=== Year-end charts ===
Chart (1993)	Position
Canada Country Tracks (RPM)	38
US Country Songs (Billboard)	3
