= (I Do It) For the Money =

Single by Charlie Major

from the album Lucky Man
- Released: August 1995
- Genre: Country
- Length: 3:23
- Label: Arista
- Songwriter: Charlie Major
- Producer: Steve Fishell

Charlie Major singles chronology
"I'm Here" (1994)	"(I Do It) For the Money" (1995)	"Tell Me Something I Don't Know" (1995)

"(I Do It) For the Money" is a song written and recorded by Canadian country music artist Charlie Major. It was released in August 1995 as the first single from Major's album Lucky Man. The song reached number 1 on the RPM Country Tracks chart in October 1995.

== Chart performance ==
Chart (1995)	Peak position
Canada Country Singles (RPM)	1

=== Year-end charts ===
Chart (1995)	Position
Canada Country Tracks (RPM)	35
