= I'm Somebody =

Single by Charlie Major

from the album The Other Side
- Released: 1993
- Genre: Country
- Length: 3:34
- Label: Arista
- Songwriters: Charlie Major; Barry Brown
- Producer: Steve Fishell

Charlie Major singles chronology
"I'm Gonna Drive You Out of My Mind" (1993)	"I'm Somebody" (1993)	"Nobody Gets Too Much Love" (1994)

"I'm Somebody" is a single by Canadian country music artist Charlie Major. Released in 1993, it was the second single Major's debut album, The Other Side. The song reached #1 on the RPM Country Tracks chart in December 1993.

== Chart performance ==
Chart (1993)	Peak position
Canada Country Singles (RPM)	1

=== Year-end charts ===
Chart (1993)	Position
Canada Country Tracks (RPM)	21
