= The Other Side (Charlie Major song) =

Single by Charlie Major

from the album The Other Side
- Released: 1994
- Genre: Country
- Length: 3:07
- Label: Arista
- Songwriter: Charlie Major
- Producer: Steve Fishell

Charlie Major singles chronology
| "Nobody Gets Too Much Love" (1994) | "The Other Side" (1994) | "It Can't Happen to Me" (1994) |

"The Other Side" is a single by Canadian country music artist Charlie Major. Released in 1994, it was the fourth single from Major's debut album The Other Side. The song reached #1 on the RPM Country Tracks chart in August 1994.

== Chart performance ==
| Chart (1994) | Peak position |
|---|---|
| Canada Country Singles (RPM) | 1 |

=== Year-end charts ===
| Chart (1994) | Position |
|---|---|
| Canada Country Tracks (RPM) | 5 |
