= Reckless (Alabama song) =

Single by Alabama

from the album Cheap Seats
- B-side: "Clear Water Blues"
- Released: August 30, 1993
- Recorded: January 1, 1993
- Genre: Country, country rock
- Length: 3:15
- Label: RCA Nashville
- Songwriters: Michael Clark; Jeff Stevens
- Producers: Alabama; Larry Michael Lee; Josh Leo

Alabama singles chronology
| "Hometown Honeymoon" (1993) | "Reckless" (1993) | "T.L.C. A.S.A.P." (1993) |

"Reckless" is a song written by Michael Clark and Jeff Stevens, and recorded by American country music group Alabama. It was released in August 1993 as the first single from their album, Cheap Seats. The song was their final number one the Billboard Hot Country Singles & Tracks (now Hot Country Songs) chart until June 2011, when they reached the number one position again with a guest vocal on Brad Paisley's "Old Alabama".

== Content ==
The song's narrator wants to take his lover in his Thunderbird, and wants for him and her to forget and care less about their current lives and live and love recklessly.

== Critical reception ==
Deborah Evans Price, of Billboard magazine reviewed the song unfavorably, saying that it is a "recycled, B-movie Bruce tune." She goes on to say that if Alabama keeps recording songs like these than the band "might as well go ahead and change its name to New Jersey."

== Chart positions ==
| Chart (1993) | Peak position |
|---|---|
| Canada Country Singles (RPM) | 1 |
| US Bubbling Under Hot 100 (Billboard) | 23 |
| US Hot Country Songs (Billboard) | 1 |

=== Year-end charts ===
| Chart (1993) | Position |
|---|---|
| Canada Country Tracks (RPM) | 15 |

| Chart (1994) | Position |
|---|---|
| Canada Country Tracks (RPM) | 78 |
