= I Love the Way You Love Me =

1993 single by John Michael Montgomery

Single by John Michael Montgomery

from the album Life's a Dance
- Released: March 1, 1993
- Genre: Country
- Length: 4:01
- Label: Atlantic
- Songwriters: Victoria Shaw, Chuck Cannon
- Producer: Doug Johnson

John Michael Montgomery singles chronology
| "Life's a Dance" (1992) | "I Love the Way You Love Me" (1993) | "Beer and Bones" (1993) |

Music video
- "I Love the Way You Love Me" on YouTube

"I Love the Way You Love Me" is a song recorded by American country music singer John Michael Montgomery from his debut album, Life's a Dance (1992). It was written by Victoria Shaw and Chuck Cannon, and released in March 1993 by Atlantic Records, as the album's second single. The song reached the top of the US Billboard Hot Country Singles & Tracks chart. It became Montgomery's first number-one single and was named Song of the Year by the Academy of Country Music. It also reached numbers 60 and 74 on the US Billboard Hot 100 and Cash Box Top 100 charts. The accompanying music video was directed by Marc Ball and premiered in early 1993. In 2024, Montgomery's son, Walker, released a cover version of his father's song.

== Charts ==
=== Weekly charts ===
| Chart (1993) | Peak position |
|---|---|
| Canada Country Singles (RPM) | 1 |
| US Billboard Hot 100 | 60 |
| US Hot Country Songs (Billboard) | 1 |
| US Cash Box Top 100 | 74 |

=== Year-end charts ===
| Chart (1993) | Position |
|---|---|
| Canada Country Tracks (RPM) | 7 |
| US Country Songs (Billboard) | 9 |

== Boyzone version ==
"I Love the Way You Love Me"

Single by Boyzone

from the album Where We Belong
- B-side: "Waiting for You"; 1. "Let the Message Run Free"; "Grease Medley" (live)
- Released: November 23, 1998
- Length: 4:06
- Label: Polydor
- Songwriters: Victoria Shaw; Chuck Cannon
- Producer: Steve Mac

Boyzone singles chronology
| "No Matter What" (1998) | "I Love the Way You Love Me" (1998) | "When the Going Gets Tough" (1999) |

Music video
- "I Love the Way You Love Me" on YouTube

"I Love the Way You Love Me" was covered by the Irish boyband Boyzone in 1998. It was released on November 23 by Polydor Records, as the fifth single from their third album, Where We Belong (1998). The song has received a gold certification in the UK, where it charted at number two, and in New Zealand, where it topped the RIANZ Singles Chart for two weeks. "I Love the Way You Love Me" was re-recorded and re-produced by Steve Mac for its single release, with the album version being produced by Rose & Foster.

=== Track listings ===
- UK CD1
1. "I Love the Way You Love Me" (Victoria Shaw, Chuck Cannon)
2. "Waiting for You" (Phil Harding, Ian Curnow, Stephen Gately)
3. "Let the Message Run Free" (Ronan Keating, Ray Hedges, Martin Brannigan)
- UK CD2
1. "I Love the Way You Love Me" (Shaw, Cannon)
2. "Grease Medley" (live from Wembley) (Barry Gibb, Jim Jacobs, Warren Casey, John Farrar)
3. "No Matter What" (live from Wembley) (Andrew Lloyd Webber, Jim Steinman)
- UK cassette single
1. "I Love the Way You Love Me" (Shaw, Cannon)
2. "Waiting for You" (Harding, Curnow, Gately)

=== Personnel ===
Personnel are lifted from the By Request album booklet.

- Victoria Shaw – writing
- Chuck Cannon – writing
- Paul Gendler – acoustic guitars
- Frizzy Karlsson – electric guitars
- Steve Mac – piano, production, mixing
- Chris Laws – drums, engineering
- Richard Niles – string arrangement
- Robin Sellars – mix engineering

=== Charts ===
==== Weekly charts ====
| Chart (1998–1999) | Peak position |
|---|---|
| Belgium (Ultratop 50 Flanders) | 28 |
| Belgium (Ultratop 50 Wallonia) | 36 |
| Europe (Eurochart Hot 100) | 7 |
| Europe (European Hit Radio) | 29 |
| Finland (Suomen virallinen lista) | 20 |
| Germany (GfK) | 50 |
| Ireland (IRMA) | 2 |
| Netherlands (Dutch Top 40) | 24 |
| Netherlands (Single Top 100) | 39 |
| Netherlands Airplay (Music & Media) | 15 |
| New Zealand (Recorded Music NZ) | 1 |
| Norway (VG-lista) | 16 |
| Scottish Singles Sales (Official Charts) | 2 |
| Sweden (Sverigetopplistan) | 17 |
| Switzerland (Schweizer Hitparade) | 43 |
| UK Singles (Official Charts) | 2 |
| UK Airplay (Music Week) | 4 |

==== Year-end charts ====
| Chart (1998) | Position |
|---|---|
| UK Singles (OCC) | 40 |

| Chart (1999) | Position |
|---|---|
| Netherlands (Dutch Top 40) | 190 |
| New Zealand (RIANZ) | 47 |

=== Certifications ===
| Region | Certification | Certified units/sales |
|---|---|---|
| New Zealand (RMNZ) | Gold | 5,000^{*} |
| United Kingdom (BPI) | Gold | 400,000^{^} |
^{*} Sales figures based on certification alone.^{^} Shipments figures based on certification alone.
