= It Can't Happen to Me =

Single by Charlie Major

from the album The Other Side
- Released: 1994
- Genre: Country
- Length: 3:58
- Label: Arista
- Songwriter: Charlie Major
- Producer: Steve Fishell

Charlie Major singles chronology
"The Other Side" (1994)	"It Can't Happen to Me" (1994)	"I'm Here" (1994)

"It Can't Happen to Me" is a single by Canadian country music artist Charlie Major. Released in 1994, it was the fifth single from Major's debut album The Other Side. The song reached #1 on the RPM Country Tracks chart in November 1994.

== Chart performance ==
Chart (1994)	Peak position
Canada Country Singles (RPM)	1

=== Year-end charts ===
Chart (1994)	Position
Canada Country Tracks (RPM)	22
