= The Other Side (Charlie Major album) =

Studio album by Charlie Major
- Released: June 25, 1993
- Genre: Country
- Length: 36:47
- Label: Arista
- Producer: Steve Fishell

Charlie Major chronology
The Other Side (1993)	Lucky Man (1995)

Professional ratings
Review scores
Source	Rating
Allmusic	link

The Other Side is the debut album of Canadian country music artist Charlie Major. All six singles released from the album went to #1 on the RPM Country chart. "Life's Too Short" was co-written by Kathie Baillie and Michael Bonagura, two-thirds of the 1980s country group Baillie & the Boys.

== Track listing ==
1. "I'm Gonna Drive You Out of My Mind" (Charlie Major, Barry Brown) – 4:07
2. "I'm Somebody" (Major, Brown) – 3:34
3. "It Can't Happen to Me" (Major) – 3:58
4. "I'm Here" (Major, Brown) – 3:32
5. "Running in the Red" (Major, Randall Prescott) – 3:46
6. "Life's Too Short" (Don Schlitz, Michael Bonagura, Kathie Baillie) – 3:36
7. "Nobody Gets Too Much Love" (Major) – 3:24
8. "Walk Away" (Major) – 4:20
9. "The Other Side" (Major) – 3:07
10. "I'll See You in My Dreams" (Major) – 3:23

== Chart performance ==
Chart (1993)	Peak position
Canadian RPM Country Albums	1
Canadian RPM Top Albums	54
