= Charlie Major =

Canadian country music artist

- Born: Charles Bernard Major; December 31, 1954 (age 71)
- Origin: Aylmer, Quebec, Canada
- Genres: Country
- Occupation: Singer-songwriter
- Instruments: Vocals, guitar
- Years active: 1993–present
- Labels: Arista; Imprint; ViK. Recordings; Dead Reckoning; Stony Plain; Koch Entertainment Canada; EMI; MDM Recordings
- Website: www.charliemajor.com

Charles Bernard Major (born December 31, 1954) is a Canadian country music artist. He has recorded seven studio albums and released more than twenty singles. In 2019 he was inducted into the Canadian Country Music Hall of Fame.

== Musical career ==
Born in Aylmer, Quebec, Charlie Major knew he wanted to be a musician since he was 19 years old. He was blinded in one eye as a result of a pellet gun accident when he was 12. Major released his debut album in Canada, The Other Side, in 1993. All six singles released from the album went to No. 1 on the RPM Country chart.

He won the Juno Award as Country Male Vocalist of the Year two years in a row (Juno Awards in 1994 and 1995). Five major Canadian Country Music Awards followed, along with songwriting honours from SOCAN, and a BMI Award in 1993 for "Backroads", recorded by Ricky Van Shelton in 1991 on his Backroads album, as the "Most Performed Song in America." In 2006 he made an appearance on the television show Holmes on Homes.

== Personal life ==
Major has three sons from a previous marriage and resides both in Ottawa, Ontario; and in Nashville, Tennessee, where he first moved in 1994.

== Awards and nominations ==
Year	Association	Category	Result
1994	Juno Awards of 1994	Country Male Vocalist of the Year	Won
1994	Juno Awards of 1994	Best New Solo Artist	Nominated
1994	Canadian Country Music Association	SOCAN Song of the Year — "I'm Going to Drive You Out of My Mind"	Won
1994	Canadian Country Music Association	Single of the Year — "I'm Going to Drive You Out of My Mind"	Won
1994	Canadian Country Music Association	Male Artist of the Year	Won
1995	Juno Awards of 1995	Country Male Vocalist of the Year	Won
1995	Canadian Country Music Association	Male Artist of the Year	Won
1996	Juno Awards of 1996	Country Male Vocalist of the Year	Won
1996	Juno Awards of 1996	Best Male Vocalist	Nominated
1996	Canadian Country Music Association	Male Artist of the Year	Won
