= Hal Ketchum discography =

Discography of American country music artist

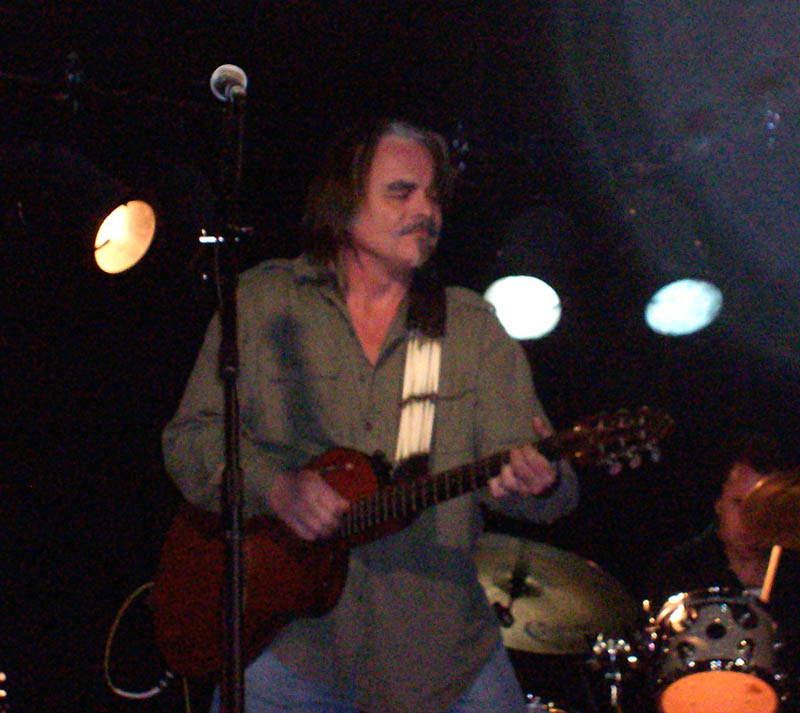
- Ketchum performing in 2008
- Studio albums: 11
- Compilation albums: 2
- Singles: 27
- Video albums: 1
- Music videos: 13

American musician Hal Ketchum released eleven studio albums, two compilation albums, and 27 singles.

Ketchum made his debut in the late 1980s on the independent Line/Sawdust label with Threadbare Alibis. In 1990, he signed to Curb Records, for which he would record through 2008. Ketchum released nine albums for the label, starting with Past the Point of Rescue, which was certified gold by the Recording Industry Association of America. He also issued two compilations for the label, and his last album was 2014's I'm the Troubadour on the Music Road label.

Between 1991 and 2007, Ketchum made 17 appearances on the Billboard Hot Country Songs chart. This total includes six top-ten hits, of which three accounted for his highest overall chart peaks of number two: "Small Town Saturday Night", "Past the Point of Rescue", and "Hearts Are Gonna Roll".

== Albums ==
=== Studio albums ===
Title	Album details	Peak positions				Certifications
Title	Album details	US Country	US	US Heat	CAN Country	Certifications
Threadbare Alibis	Release date: 1988; Label: Line/Sawdust, Watermelon	—	—	—	—	
Past the Point of Rescue	Release date: May 7, 1991; Label: Curb	6	45	2	—	US: Gold
Sure Love	Release date: September 22, 1992; Label: Curb	36	151	—	21	
Every Little Word	Release date: May 31, 1994; Label: Curb	31	146	—	—	
I Saw the Light	Release date: May 19, 1998; Label: Curb	37	—	—	—	
Awaiting Redemption	Release date: May 18, 1999; Label: Curb	—	—	—	—	
Lucky Man	Release date: September 4, 2001; Label: Curb	72	—	—	—	
The King of Love	Released: January 20, 2003; Label: Curb	—	—	—	—	
One More Midnight	Release date: March 6, 2007; Label: Curb	—	—	—	—	
Father Time	Release date: September 9, 2008; Label: Curb	—	—	—	—	
I'm the Troubadour	Release date: October 7, 2014; Label: Music Road	—	—	—	—	
"—" denotes releases that did not chart

=== Compilation albums ===
Title	Album details	Peak positions
Title	Album details	US Country
The Hits	Release date: May 7, 1996; Label: MCG / Curb	43
Greatest Hits	Release date: May 6, 2008; Label: Curb	—
"—" denotes releases that did not chart

== Singles ==
=== As lead artist ===
Year	Single	Peak positions			Certifications	Album
Year	Single	US Country	US	CAN Country	Certifications	Album
1991	"Small Town Saturday Night"	2	—	—	RIAA: Gold	Past the Point of Rescue
1991	"I Know Where Love Lives"	13	—	15		Past the Point of Rescue
1992	"Past the Point of Rescue"	2	—	1		Past the Point of Rescue
1992	"Five O'Clock World"	16	—	21		Past the Point of Rescue
1992	"Sure Love"	3	—	6		Sure Love
1993	"Hearts Are Gonna Roll"	2	—	6		Sure Love
1993	"Mama Knows the Highway"	8	—	14		Sure Love
1993	"Someplace Far Away (Careful What You're Dreaming)"	24	—	6		Sure Love
1994	"(Tonight We Just Might) Fall in Love Again"	20	—	17		Every Little Word
1994	"That's What I Get for Losin' You"	22	—	23		Every Little Word
1995	"Stay Forever"	8	— (Note: "Stay Forever" did not enter the Hot 100, but peaked at number 24 on Bubbling Under Hot 100 Singles.)	10		Every Little Word
1995	"Every Little Word"	49	—	55		Every Little Word
1995	"Veil of Tears"	56	—	—		Every Little Word
1996	"Hang In There Superman"	—	—	—		The Hits
1996	"I Miss My Mary" (Note: "I Miss My Mary" was originally recorded on Past the Point of Rescue, but was issued as a single from The Hits.)	—	—	—		The Hits
1998	"I Saw the Light"	36	— (Note: "I Saw the Light" did not enter the Hot 100, but peaked at number 21 on Bubbling Under Hot 100 Singles.)	50		I Saw the Light
1998	"When Love Looks Back at You"	—	—	—		I Saw the Light
2000	"She Is"	40	—	—		Lucky Man
2001	"Don't Let Go"	—	—	—		Lucky Man
2001	"She's Still in Dallas"	—	—	—		Lucky Man
2002	"Richest Man in Texas"	—	—	—		Lucky Man
2002	"Everytime I Look in Your Eyes"	—	—	—		The King of Love
2004	"My Love Will Not Change"	60	—	—		Non-album single
2006	"Just This Side of Heaven (Hal-lelujah)"	47	—	—		One More Midnight
2007	"In Front of the Alamo" (with LeAnn Rimes)	—	—	—		One More Midnight
2007	"One More Midnight"	—	—	—		One More Midnight
"—" denotes releases that did not chart or were not released

=== As featured artist ===
Year	Single	Album
2001	"Keep Mom and Dad in Love" (Lisa Brokop with Hal Ketchum)	Undeniable

== Other appearances ==
Year	Song	Other artist(s)	Album
1994	"For Today"	Charley Pride	My 6 Latest & 6 Greatest
1996	"If I Never Knew You"	Shelby Lynne	The Best of Country Sing the Best of Disney
1996	"Shame"	Neil Diamond	Tennessee Moon
1998	"How Mountain Girls Can Love"	Ralph Stanley	Clinch Mountain Country
2000	"On the Wings of a Dove"	—N/a	The Ultimate Popular Christian Songs
2005	"Let Your Love Flow"	The Bellamy Brothers	Angels & Outlaws, Vol. 1

== Videography ==
=== Video albums ===
Title	Album details
The Video Collection	Release date: February 12, 2002; Label: Curb

=== Music videos ===
Year	Video	Director
1991	"Small Town Saturday Night"	Senor McGuire
1992	"I Know Where Love Lives"	Richard Kooris
1992	"Past the Point of Rescue"	Steve Boyle
1992	"Sure Love"	Senor McGuire
1993	"Mama Knows the Highway"	Dick Buckley
1994	"For Today" (Charley Pride with Hal Ketchum)	Tom Denolf
1994	"(Tonight We Just Might) Fall in Love Again"	Sherman Halsey
1995	"Stay Forever"	Jim Shea
1996	"Hang in There Superman"	Jim McGuire
1998	"I Saw the Light"	Jim Shea
2001	"She Is"	
2001	"Keep Mom and Dad in Love" (Lisa Brokop with Hal Ketchum)	
2007	"In Front of the Alamo"	Glenn Sweitzer
