= The Hits (Hal Ketchum album) =

Greatest hits album by Hal Ketchum
- Released: May 7, 1996
- Recorded: 1990–1996
- Genre: Country
- Length: 51:40
- Label: MCG/Curb
- Producers: Allen Reynolds; Jim Rooney

Hal Ketchum chronology
Every Little Word (1994)	The Hits (1996)	I Saw the Light (1998)

Professional ratings
Review scores
Source	Rating
Allmusic -	4.5/5 stars

The Hits is the first compilation album by American country music artist Hal Ketchum, released on May 7, 1996. It briefly appeared on Billboard's Top Country Albums chart, peaking at No. 43. Three songs were newly recorded for this collection, "Satisfied Mind", the Bob Ferguson cover "Wings of a Dove", and "Hang in There Superman". Also included is "I Miss My Mary", an album cut from Ketchum's debut album Past the Point of Rescue.

== Track listing ==
No.	Title	Writer(s)	Length
1.	"Small Town Saturday Night"	Pat Alger, Hank DeVito	2:55
2.	"Mama Knows the Highway"	Pete Wasner, Charles John Quarto	4:17
3.	"I Know Where Love Lives"	Hal Ketchum	3:30
4.	"Past the Point of Rescue"	Mick Hanly	4:25
5.	"Someplace Far Away (Careful What You're Dreaming)"	Ketchum	4:04
6.	"Sure Love"	Gary Burr, Ketchum	3:28
7.	"Satisfied Mind"	Tony Arata	4:30
8.	"Hang in There Superman"	Ketchum, Roger Cook	4:53
9.	"Five O'Clock World"	Allen Reynolds	3:02
10.	"Hearts Are Gonna Roll"	Ketchum, Ronny Scaife	3:05
11.	"Stay Forever"	Benmont Tench, Ketchum	2:54
12.	"I Miss My Mary"	Ketchum	3:12
13.	"That's What I Get for Losin' You"	Al Anderson, Ketchum	3:41
14.	"Wings of a Dove"	Bob Ferguson	3:40

== Production on new tracks ==
As listed in liner notes

- Produced by Allen Reynolds and Jim Rooney
- Recorded and Mixed by Mark Miller
- Mastered by Denny Purcell at Georgetown Masters, Nashville, TN
- Digital editing by Carlos Grier

== Personnel on new tracks ==
As listed in liner notes

"Hang in There Superman"

- Mark Casstevens - acoustic guitar
- Dan Dugmore - pedal steel guitar
- Mike Leech - bass guitar
- Delbert McClinton - harmonica
- George Marinelli - electric guitar
- Milton Sledge - drums
- Bobby Wood - Wurlitzer electric piano

Background vocals: The W.O. Smith Nashville Community Singers (Angela Barlow, Esther Beckford, Merle Harden, Merlicia Harden, Tamica Head, Marquita Holt, Leslie Williams, Kameka Word) and "Metropolis Singers" (Delbert McClinton, Bobby Wood, Roger Cook, Jim Rooney, Tony Arata, Sandy Mason, Benita Hill, Matt Lindsey, Richard Aspinwall, Julie B. Freeman, Terrell Ketchum, Josh Allen, Mary Todd-Roberts, Charles Green, TerryPalmer, Randy Handley, Sarah Miller, Debbie Miller, Herb McCullough, Debbie Nims)

"Satisfied Mind"

- Chris Leuzinger - electric guitar
- Russ Pahl - acoustic guitar
- Milton Sledge - drums
- Pete Wasner - piano
- Bobby Wood - organ
- Bob Wray - bass guitar

Strings by The Nashville String Machine arranged by Charles Cochran

"Wings of a Dove"

- Richard Bennett - acoustic guitar
- Stuart Duncan - mandolin
- Chris Leuzinger - electric guitar
- Ruby Lovett - background vocals
- Scott Neubert - acoustic guitar
- Milton Sledge - drums
- Pete Wasner - piano
- Bob Wray - bass guitar

== Chart performance ==
Chart (1996)	Peak position
U.S. Billboard Top Country Albums	43
