= I Saw the Light =

I Saw the Light may refer to:

- "I Saw the Light" (Hank Williams song), a 1946 song written by Hank Williams, later becoming a gospel standard covered by many artists
- "I Saw the Light" (Todd Rundgren song), a 1972 song written by Todd Rundgren, later covered by many artists
- "I Saw the Light", a 1975 song performed by Status Quo on their album On the Level
- "I Saw the Light" (Wynonna Judd song) a 1992 song performed by Wynonna Judd
- I Saw the Light (Hal Ketchum album), a 1998 album containing a version of the Todd Rundgren song
- "I Saw the Light", a song by Spoon from their 2010 album Transference
- I Saw the Light (film), a 2015 biographical film about Hank Williams

== See also ==
- "I See the Light", a song by Mandy Moore and Zachary Levi
