= Sure Love =

Sure Love may refer to:

- Sure Love (album), a 1992 album by Hal Ketchum
- Sure Love (Hal Ketchum song)
- Sure Love (Jarryd James song)
