= Okie (Vince Gill album) =

Studio album by Vince Gill
- Released: August 23, 2019
- Recorded: 2019
- Studio: Blackbird Studio and The House (Nashville, Tennessee); Hound's Ear Studio (Franklin, Tennessee)
- Genre: Country
- Length: 49:45
- Label: MCA Nashville
- Producer: Vince Gill; Justin Niebank

Vince Gill chronology
Down to My Last Bad Habit (2016)	Okie (2019)	Sweet Memories (2023)

Professional ratings
Review scores
Source	Rating
AllMusic	4/5 stars
American Songwriter	3.5/5 stars

Okie is the fifteenth studio album by American country music singer Vince Gill. The album was released on August 23, 2019, by MCA Nashville.

== Background ==
According to Gill, Merle Haggard advised him to "just tell the truth. That's the most important thing of all." A number of the songs in the album have personal elements. For example, in "Forever Changed," which talks about sexual abuse, Gill drew from the experience of running away from a gym teacher who had behaved inappropriately toward him, while "When My Amy Prays" is about his wife Amy Grant and religion. Other songs deal with issues such as teenage pregnancy ("What Choice Will You Make,") and racial equality.

Gill said: "My life has never been political, I've never been out there saying endorse this candidate, or that one. But I’m not afraid to have a decent conversation about some of this stuff. We could solve so many things by being fair-minded."

He also said: "All I tried to do was have these songs maybe be about subjects that were tough, but maybe tell these stories without judgment".

== Commercial performance ==
Okie debuted at No. 9 on Billboard' Top Country Albums with 10,000 units, 9,000 of which are traditional album sales. This is Gill's 16th top 10 album on the chart. The album has sold 32,500 copies in the United States as of March 2020.

== Track listing ==
All tracks are written by Vince Gill, with additional co-writers listed.

No.	Title	Writer(s)	Length
1.	"I Don't Wanna Ride the Rails No More"		4:27
2.	"The Price of Regret"		3:50
3.	"Forever Changed"		3:41
4.	"An Honest Man"		3:40
5.	"What Choice Will You Make"	Leslie Satcher	4:13
6.	"Black and White"	Charlie Worsham	3:46
7.	"The Red Words"		4:48
8.	"When My Amy Prays"		3:55
9.	"A Letter to My Mama"	Dean Dillon	3:36
10.	"Nothin' Like a Guy Clark Song"		5:03
11.	"That Old Man of Mine"		3:52
12.	"A World Without Haggard"		4:53
Total length:			49:45

== Personnel ==
Adapted from AllMusic.

- Vince Gill – lead vocals, harmony vocals, guitars, dobro
- John Barlow Jarvis – acoustic piano, keyboards, organ
- Tom Bukovac – guitars
- Jedd Hughes – guitars
- Charlie Worsham – banjo
- Paul Franklin – steel guitar
- Michael Rhodes – bass, acoustic bass
- Fred Eltringham – drums, percussion

Production

- Sarah Marie Burke – A&R
- Vince Gill – producer, art direction
- Justin Niebank – producer, recording, mixing
- Steve Marcantonio – recording
- Matt Rausch – recording
- Brian David Willis – digital editing
- Nathan Dantzler – mastering at The Hit Lab (Nashville, Tennessee)
- Mike "Frog" Griffith – production coordinator
- Kera Jackson – art production
- Craig Allen – package design
- William Mathews – cover painting, design
- John Sherear – photography

== Charts ==
Chart (2019)	Peak position
Swiss Albums (Schweizer Hitparade)	70
US Billboard 200	71
US Top Country Albums (Billboard)	9
