= Small Town Saturday Night =

Small Town Saturday Night may refer to:

- Small Town Saturday Night (film)
- "Small Town Saturday Night" (song), by Hal Ketchum
