= Down to My Last Bad Habit =

Studio album by Vince Gill
- Released: February 12, 2016
- Recorded: 2015
- Studios: The House and Blackbird Studio (Nashville, Tennessee)
- Genre: Country
- Length: 45:57
- Label: MCA Nashville
- Producers: Vince Gill; Justin Niebank

Vince Gill chronology
Bakersfield (2013)	Down to My Last Bad Habit (2016)	Okie (2019)

Singles from Down to My Last Bad Habit
- 1. "Take Me Down" Released: February 1, 2016; 2. "Me and My Girl" Released: August 8, 2016

Down to My Last Bad Habit is the fourteenth studio album by American country music singer Vince Gill. The album was released on February 12, 2016, by MCA Nashville.

== Critical reception ==
Professional ratings
Aggregate scores
Source	Rating
Metacritic	80/100
Review scores
Source	Rating
AllMusic	4/5 stars
American Songwriter	3.5/5 stars
Rolling Stone	3/5 stars

Down to My Last Bad Habit received generally positive reviews from music critics. At Metacritic, which assigns a normalized rating out of 100 to reviews from mainstream critics, the album received an average score of 80 based on 5 reviews, which indicates "generally favorable reviews".

== Commercial performance ==
The album debuted at No. 4 on the Top Country Albums chart, with 17,000 copies sold in its first week. It is his 15th top 10 entry on the chart. It sold a further 7,500 copies in its second week. The album has sold 81,600 copies in the US as of March 2017.

== Track listing ==
No.	Title	Writer(s)	Length
1.	"Reasons for the Tears I Cry"	Vince Gill	3:55
2.	"Down to My Last Bad Habit"	Gill, Al Anderson	4:40
3.	"Me and My Girl"	Gill	3:19
4.	"Like My Daddy Did"	Gill	3:10
5.	"Make You Feel Real Good"	Gill	4:13
6.	"I Can't Do This"	Gill, Catt Gravitt, Brennin Hunt	3:28
7.	"My Favorite Movie"	Gill, Ashley Monroe	3:56
8.	"One More Mistake I Made" (featuring Chris Botti)	Gill, Adriana Rozario	3:23
9.	"Take Me Down" (featuring Little Big Town)	Gill, Jillian Jacqueline, Richard Marx	5:02
10.	"I'll Be Waiting for You" (featuring Cam)	Gill, Leslie Satcher	3:26
11.	"When It's Love"	Gill, Marx	3:47
12.	"Sad One Comin' On (A Song for George Jones)"	Gill	3:51
Total length:			45:57

Target Exclusive Bonus Tracks
No.	Title	Writer(s)	Length
13.	"Rock in My Show"	Gill, Satcher, John Hobbs	3:30
14.	"Lonesome Dove in the Moonlight" (featuring Sheryl Crow)	Gill	4:40
Total length:			52:16

== Personnel ==
- Vince Gill – vocals, backing vocals (1, 4, 7, 8, 12), electric guitar, acoustic guitar (1–4, 6–12), harmony vocals (2), mandolin (11)
- Pete Wasner – Wurlitzer electric piano (1)
- Reese Wynans – Hammond B3 organ (1, 4, 5)
- Tony Harrell – Wurlitzer electric piano (2, 3, 8, 11), Hammond B3 organ (2, 3, 8–11), accordion (3), acoustic piano (4–7, 10, 12)
- Charlie Judge – keyboards (3, 6, 9), synthesizers (6, 9, 10), Hammond B3 organ (12)
- Tom Bukovac – electric guitar (1–5, 7, 8, 10–12), acoustic guitar (6, 9)
- Dean Parks – electric guitar (1, 2, 5, 6, 8–12)
- Dann Huff – electric guitar (3, 6, 9)
- Richard Bennett – acoustic guitar (7)
- Paul Franklin –steel guitar (2–4, 6–11)
- Willie Weeks – bass (1–6, 8–12)
- Michael Rhodes – bass (7)
- Steve Jordan – drums (1–6, 8–12), percussion (8, 12)
- Fred Eltringham – drums (7), percussion (7, 11)
- Eric Darken – percussion (1–4, 6, 7, 9, 10)
- Kirk "Jelly Roll" Johnson – harmonica (5)
- Chris Botti – trumpet (8)
- Corrina Gill – backing vocals (1), harmony vocals (8)
- Jenny Van Valkenburg – harmony vocals (1)
- Ellie Holcomb – harmony vocals (3)
- Bekka Bramlett – harmony vocals (5)
- Kim Keyes – harmony vocals (6)
- Little Big Town (Karen Fairchild, Kimberly Schlapman, Phillip Sweet and Jimi Westbrook) – backing vocals (9)
- Cam (Camaron Ochs) – backing vocals (10)
- Charlie Worsham – harmony vocals (11)
- Alison Krauss – harmony vocals (12)

=== Production ===
- Vince Gill – producer
- Justin Niebank – producer, recording, mixing
- Drew Bollman – recording
- Matt Rausch – recording
- Brian David Willis – digital editing
- Andrew Mendelson – mastering at Georgetown Masters (Nashville, Tennessee)
- Karen Naff – art direction
- Craig Allen – design
- Jim White – photography
- The Fitzgerald Hartley Co. – management

== Charts ==
=== Weekly charts ===
Chart (2016)	Peak position
Canadian Albums (Billboard)	50
UK Americana Albums (Official Charts)	14
UK Country Albums (Official Charts)	5
US Billboard 200	35
US Top Country Albums (Billboard)	4

=== Year-end charts ===
Chart (2016)	Position
US Top Country Albums (Billboard)	41
