= Father Time (disambiguation) =

Father Time is a personification of time.

Father Time may also refer to:

== Fiction ==
- Father Time (DC Comics), a DC Comics supervillain who first appeared in 2006
- Father Time (novel), a 2001 Doctor Who novel by Lance Parkin
- Father Time (Marvel Comics), a Marvel Comics superhero who first appeared in 1941
- Father Time, one of the main characters of YooHoo & Friends (2012 TV series)

== Music ==
- Father Time (album), a 2008 album by American country music singer Hal Ketchum
- "Father Time", a 1996 single by Stratovarius on the album Episode
- "Father Time", a 1991 song by Richie Sambora from Stranger in This Town
- "Father Time", a 2008 song by Blind Melon from For My Friends
- "Father Time", a 2012 song by Animal Collective from Centipede Hz
- "Father Time", a 2022 song by Kendrick Lamar and Sampha from Mr. Morale & The Big Steppers

== Other ==
- "Father Time", a 1952 episode of Hallmark Hall of Fame
- "Father Time!/Apartnership!", a 2001 episode of The Fairly OddParents
- Father Time (Lord's), a weather vane at Lord's Cricket Ground, London
- "Little Father Time", son of Jude Fawley in Thomas Hardy's 1895 novel Jude the Obscure
