= Lucky Man (Hal Ketchum album) =

Studio album by Hal Ketchum
- Released: May 8, 2001
- Genre: Country
- Length: 40:43
- Label: Curb
- Producer: Rodney Crowell; "Keep Mom and Dad in Love" produced by Paul Leim and Lisa Brokop

Hal Ketchum chronology
Awaiting Redemption (1999)	Lucky Man (2001)	King of Love (2003)

Lucky Man is the seventh studio album by American country music singer Hal Ketchum. It was released by Curb Records on September 4, 2001.

== Critical reception ==
Professional ratings
Review scores
Source	Rating
AllMusic	3/5 stars

AllMusic's review states, "There's a fairly high soul quotient here that puts Ketchum more in line with the likes of Jim Lauderdale (or at least Lee Roy Parnell) than with any hat act."

Rick Bell writes in his Country Standard Time review that, "Ketchum's latest is a solid effort."

Kirsten Swanson of Variety writes, "With his Lucky Man CD released just two weeks ago, Hal Ketchum is hoping the timing is perfect for this country to be looking for an upbeat country album."

Chet Flippo of MTV and CMT begins his review with, "Hal Ketchum's first album of new material in more than two years leads this week's new album releases."

== Track listing ==
No.	Title	Writer(s)	Length
1.	"(She's Something) You're Everything"	Al Anderson; Hal Ketchum	3:10
2.	"You Can't Go Back"	Anderson; Ketchum	3:19
3.	"That's How Much You Mean To Me"	Anderson; Ketchum	2:57
4.	"Loving You Makes Me a Better Man"	Rodney Crowell	3:26
5.	"Don't Let Go"	Jesse Stone	2:50
6.	"Dreams of Martina"	Crowell	3:36
7.	"She's Still in Dallas"	Ketchum	3:18
8.	"Two of the Lucky Ones" (duet with Dolly Parton)	Jon Davis; Sherrié Austin; Will Rambeaux	3:36
9.	"Richest Man in Texas"	Ketchum	3:51
10.	"Livin' Life Lovin' You"	Anderson; Ketchum	2:24
11.	"Keep Mom & Dad In Love" (duet with Lisa Brokop)	Cyril Rawson; Lisa Brokop; Richard Wold	4:04
12.	"She Is"	Ketchum	4:12
Total length:			40:43

Track information adapted from the album's liner notes.

== Personnel ==
- Al Anderson (tracks 1, 2, 10), Biff Watson (tracks 1, 2, 6, 7, 10, 12), Chris Rodriguez (tracks 8, 9), Larry Byrom (tracks 11) - acoustic guitar
- Al Anderson (tracks 3), Brent Mason (tracks 3, 4, 6 ), Larry Byrom (tracks 11) - gut-string acoustic guitar
- John Hobbs (tracks 4, 8, 11) - string arrangements
- Andrew Gold (tracks 6), Bekka Bramlett (tracks 3, 12), Dewayne Bryant, Eddie K (tracks 5), Greg Cook (4) (tracks 5), Harry Stinson (tracks 2, 7, 12), Heath Wright (tracks 5), John Cowan (tracks 1, 4, 7, 9), John Davis (tracks 10), Marcia Ramirez (tracks 6), Tim Chewning (tracks 5), Vince Santoro (tracks 1, 2, 9, 12) - backing vocals
- Steuart Smith (tracks 9) - electric baritone guitar
- Michael Rhodes (tracks 4, 5, 7 – 12), Willie Weeks (tracks 1 – 3, 6) - bass
- John Hobbs (tracks 11) - celesta
- Steve Conn (tracks 6) - concertina
- Congas – Eric Darkin (tracks 4) - congas
- Paul Leim (tracks 11) - drum programming, drums
- Brent Mason (tracks 1, 4, 7, 10, 12), Jerry McPherson (tracks 11), Kenny Vaughan (2) (tracks 4), Steuart Smith (tracks 8) - electric guitar
- Stuart Duncan (tracks 9) - fiddle
- Biff Watson (tracks 3) - hi-string guitar
- Timothy B. Schmit (tracks 8) - harmony vocals
- John Hobbs (tracks 3, 4, 9), Tony Harrell (tracks 2) - keyboards
- Dan Dugmore (tracks 11) - mandolin
- John Hobbs (tracks 12), Tony Harrell (tracks 6) - organ
- John Hobbs (tracks 4, 5, 7, 8, 10, 11), Tony Harrell (tracks 1, 12) - piano
- Jerry Douglas (tracks 6) - dobro resonator guitar
- Jerry Douglas (tracks 2) - electric slide guitar
- Dan Dugmore (tracks 11), Paul Franklin (tracks 1, 3, 4, 7, 10) - steel guitar

Technical

- Mixed By [Mixing Engineer] – Steve MarcAntonio
- Producer – Lisa Brokop (tracks 11), Paul Leim (tracks 11), Rodney Crowell (tracks 1 – 10, 12)
- Engineer [Additional Recording] – Greg Ladanyi
- Engineer [Recording] – Donivan Cowart, Roger Moutenot, Steve MarcAntonio
- Creative Director – Sue Astin
- Design – Glenn Sweitzer
- Art Direction – Glenn Sweitzer
- Photography By – Señor McGuire

Personnel adapted from Discogs.
