= Sweet Memories (Vince Gill and Paul Franklin album) =

Studio album by Vince Gill and Paul Franklin
- Released: August 4, 2023
- Studio: Bushwood Studio (Nashville, TN)
- Genre: Country
- Length: 39:21
- Label: MCA Nashville
- Producer: Vince Gill; Paul Franklin

Vince Gill chronology
Okie (2019)	Sweet Memories (2023)	I Gave You Everything I Had (2025)

Paul Franklin chronology
Bakersfield (2013)	Sweet Memories (2023)

Sweet Memories: The Music of Ray Price & the Cherokee Cowboys is the sixteenth studio album by American country music artist Vince Gill and the second by American steel guitarist Paul Franklin. It was released on August 4, 2023, via MCA Nashville. The album is a collaborative tribute to Ray Price

== Content ==
Sweet Memories comes ten years after Gill and Franklin's first tribute album, Bakersfield, in 2013. The album was officially announced on June 2, 2023.

The recording process for the album began in 2019, six years after Ray Price's death. Both Gill and Franklin had previously worked with Price; most recently, they had collaborated on Price's final album, Beauty Is... The Final Sessions, in 2013.

The track list for the album was intentionally designed to stray away from Price's major hits, instead opting to record lesser-known hits to be able to highlight songwriting credits from other musicians, like Hank Williams, Mel Tillis, Marty Robbins, and Willie Nelson. The search was aided by Eddie Stubbs, a "walking country encyclopedia" and the longtime DJ for the Grand Ole Opry's radio station, WSM. This approach was different than Nelson's own 2016 Price tribute album, For the Good Times: A Tribute to Ray Price, which both Gill and Franklin worked on.

Gill was initially apprehensive about covering "Danny Boy" due to the sheer amount of pre-existing covers alongside the prospect of something somebody else had done.

The album is also a tribute to Price's backing band, the Cherokee Cowboys, and the caliber of talent that had been members of the band, such as Johnny Bush, Buddy Emmons, Buddy Spicher, Roger Miller, and Johnny Paycheck.

Alongside the duo's previous tribute to Merle Haggard and Buck Owens in 2013, the pair also intended to do a series of tribute albums, specifically for George Jones, Conway Twitty, and Little Jimmy Dickens.

In an interview with American Songwriter, Franklin discussed the decision to do another tribute album:

"We just want to play it. One reason we just sit down and play and then use the concept. We wanted to salute Ray Price and George Jones and Jimmy Dickens. We talked about all of them, and we just started with Ray Price and kept on getting more songs and [going], 'This is great.' We had a ball doing it. And then it became a record."

== Critical reception ==
Professional ratings
Review scores
Source	Rating
AllMusic	4/5 stars
PopMatters	8/10

"Kiss Your Picture (Is So Cold)" was nominated for a Grammy Award for Best Country Duo/Group Performance. Ultimately, the award was given to Zach Bryan and Kacey Musgraves for "I Remember Everything".

Stephen Thomas Erlewine of AllMusic gave the album four stars out of five, describing the project as "an unusually alive tribute album: it shows how old music can still sound fresh in modern contexts." The album was also listed as one of AllMusic's favorite country albums of 2023.

Steve Horowitz of PopMatters also gave the album four stars out of five, calling the album "a first-rate introduction to Ray Price" with praise for the quality of Gill's singing and Franklin's playing.

== Track listing ==
No.	Title	Writer(s)	Length
1.	"One More Time"	Mel Tillis	3:04
2.	"I'd Fight the World"	Joe Allison; Hank Cochran	2:59
3.	"You Wouldn't Know Love"	Cochran; Dave Kirby	3:48
4.	"Walkin' Slow (And Thinking 'Bout Her)"	Bobby Bare; Lance Guynes	2:34
5.	"The Same Two Lips"	Marty Robbins	3:38
6.	"Weary Blues from Waitin'"	Hank Williams	4:27
7.	"Kissing Your Picture (Is So Cold)"	Ray Price; Tillis; Wayne Walker	3:25
8.	"Sweet Memories"	Mickey Newbury	4:31
9.	"Danny Boy"	Frederic Weatherly	5:09
10.	"Your Old Love Letters"	Price	2:51
11.	"Healing Hands of Time"	Willie Nelson	2:55
Total length:			39:21

== Personnel ==
=== Musicians ===
- Vince Gill – lead vocals, acoustic guitar, electric guitar
- Paul Franklin – steel guitar
- Greg Morrow – drums
- Dennis Crouch – upright bass, double bass
- Michael Rhodes – electric bass
- John Barlow Jarvis – piano, Hammond organ
- Tom Bukovac – electric guitar
- Stuart Duncan – fiddle
- Jerry Roe – drums
- Derek Wells – electric guitar
- Steve Gibson – electric guitar, bass
- Wendy Moten – background vocals, harmony vocals
- Andrea Zonn – background vocals, harmony vocals

=== Technical ===
- Vince Gill – producer
- Paul Franklin – producer
- Justin Niebank – mixing, recording
- Matt Rausch – assistant engineer, assistant recording
- Andrew Mendelson – mastering
- Mike "Frog" Griffith – production coordinator
