= Every Little Word (album) =

Studio album by Hal Ketchum
- Released: May 31, 1994
- Recorded: 1993–1994
- Studio: Jack's Tracks (Nashville, Tennessee)
- Genre: Country
- Length: 36:41
- Label: MGC/Curb
- Producer: Allen Reynolds; Jim Rooney

Hal Ketchum chronology
Sure Love (1992)	Every Little Word (1994)	The Hits (1996)

Singles from Every Little Word
- 1. "(Tonight We Just Might) Fall in Love Again" Released: April 18, 1994; 2. "That's What I Get for Losin' You" Released: September 24, 1994; 3. "Stay Forever" Released: January 30, 1995; 4. "Every Little Word" Released: June 1995; 5. "Veil of Tears" Released: October 1995

Every Little Word is the fourth studio album by American country music artist Hal Ketchum, released on May 31, 1994. It peaked at #31, better than his previous album, on Billboard's Top Country Albums chart. Of the five singles released from the album, "Stay Forever" was the most successful, peaking at # 8 on the Hot Country Songs chart. The other singles, "(Tonight We Just Might) Fall in Love Again", "That's What I Get for Losin' You", "Every Little Word", and "Veil of Tears" peaked at #20, #22, #49 and #56, respectively.

Patty Loveless sings harmony vocals on "Another Day Gone".

== Critical reception ==
Professional ratings
Review scores
Source	Rating
AllMusic	4.5/5 stars
Entertainment Weekly	A−

Michael McCall of AllMusic praised the album as being Ketchum's most consistent and most country album to date. He wrote that Ketchum "reconciles the thoughtfulness of his folkie heart with the verve of modern country, tapping into the directness and earthiness that ties them together.

== Track listing ==
No.	Title	Writer(s)	Length
1.	"(Tonight We Just Might) Fall in Love Again"	Al Anderson, Hal Ketchum	3:23
2.	"Every Little Word"	Marcus Hummon, Ketchum	3:47
3.	"Swing Low"	Pete Wasner, Ketchum	4:29
4.	"Another Day Gone"	Gary Nicholson, Ketchum	3:54
5.	"That's What I Get for Losin' You"	Anderson, Ketchum	3:41
6.	"Stay Forever"	Benmont Tench, Ketchum	2:54
7.	"Walk Away"	Nicholson, Ketchum	4:26
8.	"Veil of Tears"	Michael Noble, Jeff Pennig, Ketchum	2:49
9.	"No Easy Road"	Harley Allen, Herb McCullough	2:54
10.	"Drive On"	Gary Burr, Ketchum	4:24

== Production ==
As listed in liner notes

- Produced by Allen Reynolds and Jim Rooney
- Recorded and Mixed by Mark Miller
- Assistant engineer: Duke Duczer
- Mastered by Denny Purcell at Georgetown Masters, Nashville, TN
- Digital editing by Carlos Grier

== Personnel ==
As listed in liner notes

- Sam Bacco - percussion
- Richard Bennett - acoustic guitar
- Gary Burr - background vocals on "Drive On"
- Sam Bush - mandolin
- Keith Carper - background vocals
- Dan Dugmore - pedal steel guitar, Dobro
- Hal Ketchum - lead vocals
- Chris Leuzinger - acoustic guitar, electric guitar
- Patty Loveless - background vocals on "Another Day Gone"
- Scott Neubert - background vocals
- Russ Pahl - Dobro on "Another Day Gone", acoustic guitar on "Drive On"
- Milton Sledge - drums
- Pete Wasner - piano, Wurlitzer
- Bobby Wood - Hammond B-3 organ, synthesizer
- Bob Wray - bass guitar

Strings by The Nashville String Machine arranged by Charles Cochran

== Chart performance ==
Chart (1994)	Peak position
U.S. Billboard Top Country Albums	31
U.S. Billboard 200	146
