= Ballistic Kisses =

Ballistic Kisses was a New York-based new wave music group comprising Mike Parker, Mike Hrynyk, Jeff Freund, and Rich McClusky. The group is perhaps best known for their cover of The Vogues' "Five O'Clock World", which was released as a single in 1982.

== Discography ==
=== Albums ===
- Total Access (1982, Don't Fall Off the Mountain)
- Wet Moment (1983, Don't Fall Off The Mountain)

=== Singles ===
- "Five O'Clock World" (7", Ensign) (1982)
- "Five O'Clock World" (12", Ensign) (1982)
- "Sharecrop the Night" (12", Don't Fall Off The Mountain) (1984)
