= Bakersfield (album) =

Studio album by Vince Gill and Paul Franklin
- Released: July 30, 2013
- Studio: The House (Nashville, Tennessee)
- Genre: Country
- Length: 36:59
- Label: MCA Nashville
- Producer: Vince Gill Paul Franklin

Vince Gill chronology
Ballads (2013)	Bakersfield (2013)	Down to My Last Bad Habit (2016)

Paul Franklin chronology
Bakersfield (2013)	Sweet Memories (2023)

Professional ratings
Aggregate scores
Source	Rating
Metacritic	80/100
Review scores
Source	Rating
AllMusic	4/5 stars
Engine 145	5/5 stars
Taste of Country	4/5 stars
Roughstock	5/5 stars

Bakersfield is the thirteenth studio album by American country music artist Vince Gill and steel guitar player Paul Franklin. It was released on July 30, 2013, via MCA Nashville. The album is a collaborative tribute of Merle Haggard and Buck Owens songs. It reached number 4 on Top Country Albums.

== Content ==
Vince Gill and his fellow The Time Jumpers band member Paul Franklin re-recorded songs by Buck Owens and Merle Haggard as a tribute, pulling five songs from each artist, all from 1961 -1974.

== Critical reception ==
Bakersfield has received positive reviews from music critics. Metacritic assigns an average score out of 100 from reviews and ratings from mainstream critics. The album received a metascore of 80, based on 5 reviews.

Billy Dukes at Taste of Country rated the album 4 out of 5 stars. He states, "Gill and Franklin work like a polished vocal duo, only the pedal steel is Franklin’s voice," and goes on to say, "the album’s production is notable for being crystal clear. Each instrument stands out without stepping out." He finishes by saying, "You’ll struggle to find two more professional, humble musicians in Nashville, and those qualities — along with a top notch band and great songs — make for a very satisfying listen."

Daryl Addison from Great American Country also positively reviewed the album. Addison states, "the pair exhibits a palpable chemistry that breathes new life into each one of the album’s songs" and "surround themselves with top-notch players" He finishes by saying, "This artistic give and take, set inside classic and well-known songs, makes the album feel alive and new."

== Track listing ==
No.	Title	Writer(s)	Length
1.	"Foolin' Around"	Harlan Howard, Buck Owens	2:54
2.	"Branded Man"	Merle Haggard	3:47
3.	"Together Again"	Owens	3:44
4.	"The Bottle Let Me Down"	Haggard	3:20
5.	"He Don't Deserve You Anymore"	Arty Lange, Owens	3:44
6.	"I Can't Be Myself"	Haggard	3:48
7.	"Nobody's Fool But Yours"	Owens	2:54
8.	"Holding Things Together"	Haggard	6:04
9.	"But I Do"	Tommy Collins	3:06
10.	"The Fightin' Side of Me"	Haggard	3:38
Total length:			36:59

== Personnel ==
- Vince Gill – lead vocals, acoustic guitar, electric lead guitar (1, 2, 4, 5, 7–10), harmony vocals (1, 2, 4, 5, 7–10)
- Paul Franklin – pedal steel guitar
- John Hobbs – keyboards (1, 3–10), acoustic piano (2)
- J. T. Corenflos – electric rhythm guitar
- Willie Weeks – bass (1, 2, 4–6, 8–10)
- Brad Albin – upright bass (3, 7)
- Greg Morrow – drums
- Kenny Sears – fiddle (1, 7)
- Larry Franklin – fiddle (9)
- Joe Spivey – fiddle (9)
- Dawn Sears – harmony vocals (2, 4, 8, 10)

== Production ==
- Vince Gill – producer
- Paul Franklin – producer
- Justin Niebank – recording, mixing
- Matt Rausch – additional recording, recording assistant, mix assistant
- Drew Bollman – recording assistant, mix assistant
- Andrew Mendleson – mastering at Georgetown Masters (Nashville, Tennessee)
- Natthaphol Abhigantaphand – mastering assistant
- Daniel Bacigalupi – mastering assistant
- Adam Grover – mastering assistant
- LeAnn Bennett – production coordinator
- Mike "Frog" Griffith – production coordinator
- Karen Naff – art direction
- Craig Allen – design
- Aaron Johnson (Anderson Design Group) – illustration
- Jim Wright – photography
- Debra Wingo – hair, make-up
- Merle Haggard – liner notes
- The Fitzgerald Hartley Co. – management

== Chart performance ==
The album debuted at No.4 in the Top Country Albums chart with 11,000 copies sold. The album has sold 56,000 copies in the US as of February 2014.

=== Album ===
Chart (2013)	Peak position
US Billboard Top Country Albums	4
US Billboard 200	25
