= Father Time (album) =

Studio album by Hal Ketchum
- Released: September 9, 2008
- Genre: Country
- Label: Asylum-Curb
- Producer: Hal Ketchum

Hal Ketchum chronology
One More Midnight (2007)	Father Time (2008)	I'm the Troubadour (2014)

Professional ratings
Review scores
Source	Rating
AllMusic	4/5 stars
Country Standard Time	

Father Time is a studio album from country music artist Hal Ketchum. The album was released on September 9, 2008 on Asylum-Curb Records. It is the follow-up to 2007's One More Midnight, which was only released in the United Kingdom. Father Time is composed of fourteen new songs that were recorded in Curb Studios. "Jersey Girl", a cover of the Tom Waits song, is the only track on the album that Ketchum did not write or co-write.

No singles were released from the album.

== Track listing ==
1. "Invisible" (Hal Ketchum, Gary Nicholson) – 3:50
2. "Yesterday's Gone" (Ketchum) – 4:06
3. "Millionaire's Wife" (Ketchum) – 4:11
4. "Million Dollar Baby" (Ketchum, Charlie Kelly, Lynmarie Rink) – 4:58
5. "Ordinary Day" (Ketchum, Darrell Scott) – 3:05
6. "Continental Farewell" (Ketchum, Jim Reilly) – 3:10
7. "Surrounded by Love" (Ketchum) – 2:53
8. "The Day He Called Your Name" (Ketchum) – 3:51
9. "The Preacher and Me" (Ketchum) – 4:40
10. "If You Don't Love Me, Baby (Just Let Me Go)" (Ketchum, Al Anderson) – 3:03
11. "Sparrow" (Ketchum) – 4:20
12. "Down Along the Guadalupe" (Ketchum) – 4:25
13. "Jersey Girl" (Tom Waits) – 3:42
14. "Strangest Dreams" (Ketchum, Rivers Rutherford) – 4:58
