= (Tonight We Just Might) Fall in Love Again =

Single by Hal Ketchum

from the album Every Little Word
- B-side: "Drive On"
- Released: April 18, 1994
- Genre: Country
- Length: 3:25
- Label: Curb
- Songwriters: Hal Ketchum, Al Anderson
- Producers: Allen Reynolds, Jim Rooney

Hal Ketchum singles chronology
"Someplace Far Away (Careful What You're Dreaming)" (1993)	"(Tonight We Just Might) Fall in Love Again" (1994)	"That's What I Get for Losin' You" (1994)

"(Tonight We Just Might) Fall in Love Again" is a song co-written and recorded by American country music artist Hal Ketchum. It was released in April 1994 as the first single from the album Every Little Word. The song reached No. 20 on the U.S. Billboard Hot Country Singles & Tracks chart. It was written by Ketchum and Al Anderson.

== Music video ==
The music video was directed by Sherman Halsey and premiered in May 1994.

== Chart performance ==
"(Tonight We Just Might) Fall in Love Again" debuted at number 66 on the U.S. Billboard Hot Country Singles & Tracks for the week of April 23, 1994.

Chart (1994)	Peak position
Canada Country Singles (RPM)	17
US Hot Country Songs (Billboard)	20
