= I Saw the Light (Hal Ketchum album) =

Studio album by Hal Ketchum
- Released: May 19, 1998
- Genre: Country
- Length: 38:26
- Label: Curb
- Producer: Chuck Howard (except 6, 8, 9); Stephen Bruton (6, 8, and 9 only)

Hal Ketchum chronology
The Hits (1996)	I Saw the Light (1998)	Awaiting Redemption (1999)

I Saw the Light is the fifth studio album by American country music singer Hal Ketchum. It was released on May 19, 1998 via Curb Records. The album charted one single, a cover of Todd Rundgren's "I Saw the Light".

== Content ==
The title track and lead single to the album is a cover of Todd Rundgren's 1972 single "I Saw the Light". Ketchum's version charted at number 36 on the Billboard Hot Country Songs chart and number 21 on Bubbling Under Hot 100 Singles. "When Love Looks Back at You" was also issued as a single, but it did not chart.

== Critical reception ==
Thom Owens of AllMusic called the album "drastically uneven", noticing a difference in style between the two recording sessions on the album.

James N. Thurman of The Christian Science Monitor writes that the album, "marks the return of an artist who continues to push the edges of country music at a time when it's hard to put most music in any sort of box."

The Weekly Wire's Michael McCall reviews the album and says, "Over the course of his career, Ketchum has made some strong records, but I Saw the Light is his best album yet."

Susan Campbell of The Hartford Courant concludes her review with, "We're glad Hal Ketchum is happy. And we are, selfishly, immensely glad he's out there, making music."

Jack Hurst of the Chicago Tribune writes, "The songs on "I Saw the Light" reflect both the hopelessness of Ketchum's recent past and the brightness of his future."

CNN's review says of I Saw the Light, "It's a comeback of sorts for Ketchum, who says he went through some dark days following the release of his last record in 1991."

The Washington Post's Bill Friskics-Warren writes of the album that it's, "a far more personal record than many made by his multi-platinum-selling country counterparts."

== Track listing ==
All tracks are written by Hal Ketchum, unless otherwise noted.

No.	Title	Writer(s)	Length
1.	"A Girl Like You"		3:24
2.	"I Saw The Light"	Todd Rundgren	3:10
3.	"Tell Me"	Hal Ketchum; Stephen Bruton	3:03
4.	"Long Way Down"		3:23
5.	"When Love Looks Back At You"	Jess Leary; Craig Wiseman	3:04
6.	"Love Me, Love Me Not"	Fred Koller; Tim O'Brien	3:14
7.	"A Wave Of Your Hand"		3:41
8.	"The Unforgiven"		4:12
9.	"Too Many Memories"	Bruton	4:56
10.	"For Tonight"	Ketchum; Sharon Vaughn	3:26
11.	"You'll Never Hurt That Way Again"		3:00
Total length:			38:33
