= Mama Knows the Highway =

Single by Hal Ketchum

from the album Sure Love
- Released: June 14, 1993
- Genre: Country
- Length: 4:17
- Label: Curb
- Songwriters: Pete Wasner; Charles John Quarto
- Producers: Allen Reynolds; Jim Rooney

Hal Ketchum singles chronology
"Hearts Are Gonna Roll" (1993)	"Mama Knows the Highway" (1993)	"Someplace Far Away (Careful What You're Dreaming)" (1993)

"Mama Knows the Highway" is a song written by Pete Wasner and Charles John Quarto, and recorded by American country music artist Hal Ketchum. It was released in June 1993 as the third single from his album Sure Love. The song reached number 8 on the Billboard Hot Country Singles & Tracks chart in August 1993.

== Music video ==
The music video was directed by Dick Buckley and premiered in mid-1993.

== Chart performance ==
Chart (1993)	Peak position
Canada Country Singles (RPM)	14
US Hot Country Songs (Billboard)	8
