= Stay Forever (Hal Ketchum song) =

Single by Hal Ketchum

from the album Every Little Word
- B-side: "Every Little Word"
- Released: January 30, 1995
- Genre: Country
- Length: 2:54
- Label: MCG/Curb
- Songwriters: Benmont Tench; Hal Ketchum
- Producers: Allen Reynolds; Jim Rooney

Hal Ketchum singles chronology
"That's What I Get for Losin' You" (1994)	"Stay Forever" (1995)	"Every Little Word" (1995)

"Stay Forever" is a song co-written and recorded by American country music artist Hal Ketchum. It was released in January 1995 as the third single from his album Every Little Word. The song reached number 8 on the Billboard Hot Country Singles & Tracks chart in May 1995. It was written by Ketchum and Benmont Tench.

== Critical reception ==
Larry Flick, of Billboard magazine reviewed the song unfavorably, saying that Ketchum does his "vocal best" to rescue the ballad. He goes on to call it a "not-so-special song."

== Music video ==
The music video was directed by Jim Shea and premiered in early 1995.

== Chart performance ==
"Stay Forever" debuted at number 69 on the U.S. Billboard Hot Country Singles & Tracks for the week of February 11, 1995.

Chart (1995)	Peak position
Canada Country Singles (RPM)	10
US Bubbling Under Hot 100 (Billboard)	24
US Hot Country Songs (Billboard)	8

=== Year-end charts ===
Chart (1995)	Position
Canada Country Tracks (RPM)	85
