= Sure Love (album) =

Studio album by Hal Ketchum
- Released: September 22, 1992
- Studio: Jack's Tracks (Nashville, Tennessee)
- Genre: Country
- Length: 37:16
- Label: Curb
- Producer: Allen Reynolds; Jim Rooney

Hal Ketchum chronology
| Past the Point of Rescue (1991) | Sure Love (1992) | Every Little Word (1994) |

Singles from Sure Love
- 1. "Sure Love" Released: September 21, 1992; 2. "Hearts Are Gonna Roll" Released: February 15, 1993; 3. "Mama Knows the Highway" Released: June 14, 1993; 4. "Someplace Far Away (Careful What You're Dreaming)" Released: September 13, 1993

Professional ratings
Review scores
| Source | Rating |
|---|---|
| Allmusic | 3/5 stars |

Sure Love is the third studio album American country music artist Hal Ketchum. It was released in 1992 (see 1992 in country music) on Curb Records. The album produced four chart singles on the Billboard Hot Country Singles & Tracks (now Hot Country Songs) charts. In order of release, these were the title track, "Hearts Are Gonna Roll", "Mama Knows the Highway", and "Someplace Far Away" (which was re-titled "Someplace Far Away (Careful What You're Dreaming)" upon release to radio). Respectively, these reached #3, #2, #8, and #24 on the country charts.

== Track listing ==
| No. | Title | Writer(s) | Length |
|---|---|---|---|
| 1. | "Sure Love" | Gary Burr, Hal Ketchum | 3:28 |
| 2. | "Mama Knows the Highway" | Pete Wasner, Charles John Quarto | 4:17 |
| 3. | "You Lovin' Me" | Ketchum | 4:23 |
| 4. | "Hearts Are Gonna Roll" | Ketchum, Ronny Scaife | 3:05 |
| 5. | "Softer Than a Whisper" | Pat Alger, Austin Cunningham | 3:31 |
| 6. | "Ghost Town" | Wasner, Quarto | 4:39 |
| 7. | "Daddy's Oldsmobile" | Ketchum, David Mallett | 2:51 |
| 8. | "Till the Coast Is Clear" | Ketchum, Fred Koller | 2:55 |
| 9. | "Trail of Tears" | Randy Handley | 4:03 |
| 10. | "Someplace Far Away (Careful What You're Dreaming)" | Ketchum | 4:04 |

== Personnel ==
- Hal Ketchum - lead vocals
- Richard Bennett – acoustic guitar
- Gary Burr – harmony vocals (tracks 1, 2, 4, 6, 10)
- Bruce Bouton – pedal steel guitar (track 6, 10)
- Keith Carper – harmony vocals (track 9)
- Stuart Duncan – mandolin (track 2)
- Kirk "Jellyroll" Johnson – harmonica (track 10)
- Chris Leuzinger – electric guitar, slide guitar, acoustic guitar
- Bill Miller – Woodland Indian courtship flute (track 9)
- Joey Miskulin – accordion (track 7)
- Scott Neubert – harmony vocals (track 9)
- Debbie Nims – harmony vocals (track 5)
- Milton Sledge – drums
- Pete Wasner – keyboards
- Bob Wray – bass guitar
- Trisha Yearwood – harmony vocals (track 3)

Technical

- Mark Miller - engineer
- Denny Purcell - mastering

== Chart performance ==
| Chart (1992) | Peak position |
|---|---|
| U.S. Billboard Top Country Albums | 36 |
| U.S. Billboard 200 | 151 |
| Canadian RPM Country Albums | 21 |
