= Hal Ketchum =

American country musician (1953-2020)

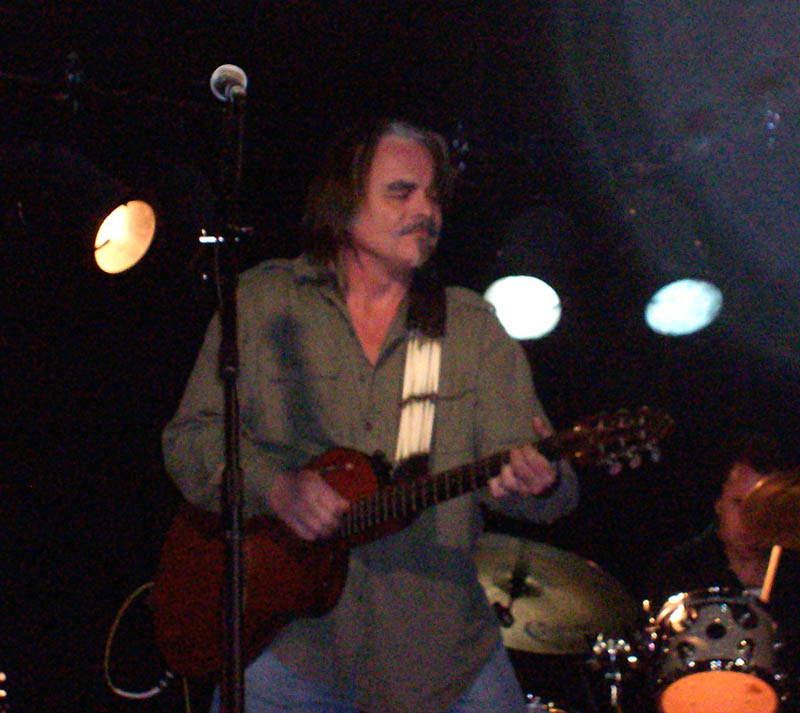
- Ketchum performing in 2008

Background information
- Born: Hal Michael Ketchum; April 9, 1953; Greenwich, New York, U.S.
- Died: November 23, 2020 (aged 67) Fischer, Texas, U.S.
- Cause of death: Dementia
- Genre: Country
- Occupation: Singer-songwriter
- Instruments: Vocals; acoustic guitar
- Years active: 1968–2019
- Labels: Line/Sawdust; Watermelon; Curb; Music Road

Hal Michael Ketchum (April 9, 1953 – November 23, 2020) was an American country music singer and songwriter. Born in Greenwich, New York, he began his professional music career in Texas. After an independent release in the late 1980s, he signed with Curb Records in 1990, for which he would record until 2008. Ketchum recorded nine albums and one greatest-hits package for Curb, and a final album for Music Road in 2014.

The 1991 release Past the Point of Rescue was his most commercially successful, having been certified gold by the Recording Industry Association of America. Between 1991 and 2006, Ketchum had 17 entries on the Billboard Hot Country Songs charts, including three that reached the number two position: his debut single "Small Town Saturday Night", as well as a cover of Mick Hanly's "Past the Point of Rescue", and "Hearts Are Gonna Roll". He was inducted into the Grand Ole Opry in 1994. Diagnoses of transverse myelitis and multiple sclerosis slowed the pace of his career by the end of the 1990s, although he continued to tour and record until early-onset dementia led him to retire in 2019.

Ketchum's music is defined by his songwriting, tenor singing voice, and minimalist production. He received general critical favor for his influences of folk music and country musicians from Texas.

== Early life ==
Hal Michael Ketchum was born on April 9, 1953, in Greenwich, New York. He was the middle of three children. His father worked for newspaper publisher Gannett (now USA Today Co.) and played banjo; his mother was diagnosed with multiple sclerosis while Hal was still a child, and was institutionalized before dying from complications of the disease in 1986. Ketchum and his father listened to artists such as Buck Owens, Merle Haggard, and Hank Williams.

At the age of 15, he began performing in clubs as a drummer with a rhythm and blues trio. He left home at age 17 and moved to Florida to work in carpentry. In 1981, Ketchum moved to Austin, Texas, where he began to visit Gruene Hall, a dance hall outside New Braunfels, Texas. This influenced him to begin singing and songwriting, in addition to learning how to play guitar. Ketchum began performing at open mic nights at Gruene Hall, which led to him becoming a regular performer there. He also supported himself financially by building cabinets. In 1987, Ketchum competed in the Kerrville Folk Festival, where he became a finalist. Through this competition he also befriended songwriter Pat Alger. Singer-songwriter Jerry Jeff Walker heard Ketchum perform an original song titled "The Belgian Team" on radio station KUT, and as he was "impressed" by Ketchum's songwriting, he asked his wife Susan to contact the singer. This led to Ketchum serving as an opening act for twelve of Walker's concerts in California in January 1988, in addition to Susan serving as his manager.

== Music career ==
=== 1989–1990: Threadbare Alibis ===
Ketchum began recording his first album in 1985, paying for much of the process himself. Unable to afford audio mixing, Ketchum hid the master recordings under his bed for about eight months when he was contacted by Heinz Geissler, a record executive with German-based Line/Sawdust Records. Geissler financed the album's completion and packaging, and released it under the title Threadbare Alibis in 1989. Line/Sawdust distributed the album in Europe, while rights for distribution in the United States were handled by Austin-based Watermelon Records. Peter Blackstock of the Austin American-Statesman rated the album three out of five stars, praising its folk instrumentation, Ketchum's tenor voice, and "workingman's dilemmas" of his lyrics.

As Ketchum wanted to write songs professionally, Alger encouraged him to travel between Austin and Nashville, Tennessee, to "develop his contacts" with members of the latter city's music industry. Among those he came in contact with were record producers Jim Rooney and Allen Reynolds, the latter of whom would also go on to serve as Garth Brooks' producer. He also submitted a number of demo recordings to various record industry executives with the intent of having them recorded by other artists. Dick Whitehouse, an executive at Curb Records at the time, heard one of Ketchum's demos and thought he should sign to the label as a singer. Ketchum signed with Curb in April 1990, and began working with Rooney and Reynolds to record his first album for the label soon afterward.

=== 1991–1992: Past the Point of Rescue ===
Ketchum's Curb Records debut, Past the Point of Rescue, was released in 1991. Reynolds, Kathy Mattea (also produced by Reynolds at the time), and Gary Burr provided backing vocals, while Ketchum and Richard Bennett both played acoustic guitar. Steel guitar player Bruce Bouton, electric guitarist Chris Leuzinger, and drummer Milton Sledge, all of Brooks' studio band the G-Men, contributed as well. Ketchum wrote or co-wrote seven of its ten songs. The lead single was "Small Town Saturday Night", which Alger wrote with Hank DeVito. After release, the song reached a peak of number two on the Billboard Hot Country Songs chart, and number one on the country music charts of Radio & Records. "Small Town Saturday Night" was promoted through a music video which incorporated footage from the 1938 Western film The Terror of Tiny Town. Next came Ketchum's own composition "I Know Where Love Lives", which charted at number thirteen. Also peaking at number two was the title track, a cover of Irish musician Mick Hanly. The last single from the album was a rendition of the Vogues' "Five O'Clock World", which Ketchum took into the top 20 of Hot Country Songs in 1992. Ketchum later recalled that he recommended the song to Reynolds, unaware that Reynolds wrote it.

Alanna Nash of Entertainment Weekly rated the album "A−", stating that "Literate and tuneful, Past the Point of Rescue balances poetic love songs with a squint-eyed look at teenage rebellion, romance, and psychological intrigue, all delivered with a tenor that throbs with passion and conviction." Past the Point of Rescue was certified gold by the Recording Industry Association of America for U.S. shipments of 500,000 copies; in 2024, "Small Town Saturday Night" also certified gold for the same number of music downloads. Ketchum promoted the album throughout 1991 by serving as an opening act for Randy Travis. For touring purposes, Ketchum established a road band called the Alibis, consisting of drummer Wes Starr, bassist Keith Carper, and guitarist Scott Neubert.

=== 1992–1993: Sure Love ===
His second Curb album and third overall, Sure Love, came out in 1992. The album included many of the same production and musical personnel as its predecessor, along with a backing vocal from Trisha Yearwood on the track "You Lovin' Me". Ketchum said that the album contained "social issues [he] wanted to address", including homelessness in "Daddy's Oldsmobile" and the Trail of Tears in a song of the same name. At the same time, he considered the album "less brooding" than his debut. The album's title track, which Ketchum wrote with Burr, charted at number three on Hot Country Songs in early 1993, followed by "Hearts Are Gonna Roll" at number two and "Mama Knows the Highway" (previously the B-side of "Sure Love") at number eight. The final single was "Someplace Far Away (Careful What You're Dreaming)" with a peak of number 24. Following this album's release, Ketchum co-headlined a tour with Kathy Mattea. Michael McCall of AllMusic called the album "slicker" than its predecessor, but praised the songs' melodies and the lyrics of "Mama Knows the Highway" and "Daddy's Oldsmobile". An uncredited review in the Newport News, Virginia, Daily Press rated the album four out of five stars, praising the sounds and lyrics of the title track, "Softer Than a Whisper", and "Daddy's Oldsmobile" in particular.

=== 1994–1996: Every Little Word and The Hits ===
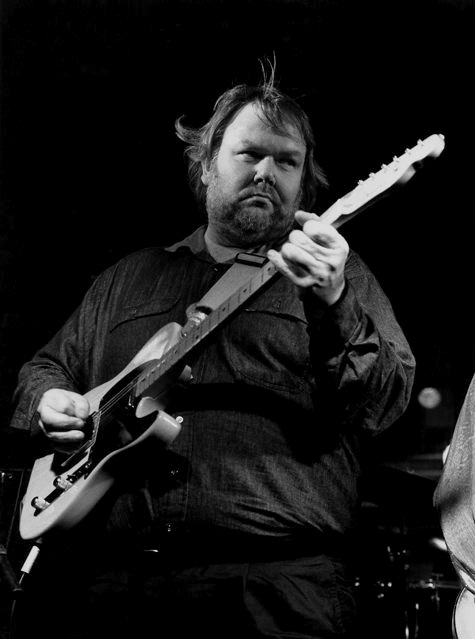
Al Anderson (pictured) co-wrote two songs on Ketchum's 1994 album Every Little Word.

Ketchum's 1994 album Every Little Word accounted for five singles. He wrote both of the first two, "(Tonight We Just Might) Fall in Love Again" and "That's What I Get for Losin' You", with former NRBQ member Al Anderson. These peaked at numbers 20 and 22 on Hot Country Songs in 1994, respectively. After it came Ketchum's last top-ten hit "Stay Forever", which he wrote with Benmont Tench. The title track and its B-side, "Veil of Tears", both fell short of the top 40 upon release in 1995.

Of the process of recording the album, Ketchum said that the melody and first verse of "Stay Forever" came to him immediately after waking up one day on his tour bus. He also said that he encouraged the musicians to "let the music slop over the edges a little", and recorded all the vocals in only one take, to replicate the feel of a concert. Because of these factors, Rooney thought the album's sound had "that extra spark" compared to the first two. Dan DeLuca, in a review for The Philadelphia Inquirer re-published in the Orlando Sentinel, praised the two songs co-written with Anderson, as well as the "sadness" of "Veil of Tears" and inclusion of Patty Loveless on "Another Day Gone".

Ketchum was inducted as the 71st member of the Grand Ole Opry in 1994. His father attended the induction shortly before his death from lung cancer. Also in 1994, Ketchum made his acting debut with a cameo appearance as a bank robber in the Mel Gibson movie Maverick. Lari White's early-1995 single "That's How You Know (When You're in Love)" featured Ketchum on backing vocals.

Curb Records founder Mike Curb encouraged Ketchum in 1996 to release a greatest-hits album, as he observed that many of Ketchum's songs had continued to receive strong radio airplay. This compilation, titled The Hits, included ten of his singles, the album track "I Miss My Mary" from Past the Point of Rescue, and three new songs. Among these were covers of Tony Arata's "Satisfied Mind" and Ferlin Husky's "Wings of a Dove". He chose to cover the latter after singing it with Husky at his own Grand Ole Opry induction. Ketchum and Roger Cook wrote a new song for the compilation titled "Hang in There Superman" in tribute to actor Christopher Reeve, best known for playing Superman in the 1970s and 1980s film series, after he was paralyzed in a horseback riding accident. This song was released to radio as a single in March 1996. "I Miss My Mary" was also promoted as a single from The Hits. Upon release of The Hits, Ketchum said that he wanted to take the year 1996 off from touring so that he could focus on songwriting.

=== 1997–1999: I Saw the Light and Awaiting Redemption ===
Tom Roland of The Tennessean observed in May 1997 that Ketchum had been "quiet" during this portion of his career, outside occasional appearances at Nashville-based benefit concerts, due to the singer's concerns that he wanted to "re-energize" himself instead of immediately making another album to maintain success at radio. That same year he ended his hiatus by recording new music with his road band and Delbert McClinton. This new music, produced by Austin-based guitarist Stephen Bruton, was intended for a new album tentatively titled Hal Yes. While the project was initially slated for release in August 1997, Ketchum announced the same month that he would be delaying the project and a corresponding tour that would have promoted it, initially citing his entry into drug rehabilitation. Ketchum stated in a 1998 interview with Nashville Scene magazine that he had become addicted to alcohol and opiates, and was convinced by his friends to undergo rehabilitation.

According to Ketchum, he and Curb Records executive Chuck Howard mutually agreed not to release Hal Yes after the initial delay, as they thought its more rock and blues-influenced sound would cause it to sell poorly. Additionally, Ketchum later observed that he had undergone a divorce prior to writing for the Hal Yes tracks, but had re-married following the album's delay, which he thought left him less emotionally connected to most of its "darker, more brooding songs." Howard and Ketchum selected three songs from the Hal Yes sessions and a new batch of "upbeat love songs" recorded under Howard's production, which became his 1998 album I Saw the Light. The album took its title from its cover of Todd Rundgren's "I Saw the Light", which served as the lead single and peaked at number 36 on the country charts. "When Love Looks Back at You" was also released as a single. Thom Owens found the album "uneven" due to the contrast between the songs produced by Howard and those produced by Bruton.

Despite the initial rejection of Hal Yes, it was ultimately released in 1999 under the title Awaiting Redemption. He and the label agreed on this release as a condition of I Saw the Light failing to provide a hit single despite its original intent of including radio-friendly songs. Ketchum wrote eight of the ten songs and painted the project's cover art. Wilfred Langmaid of the Daily Gleaner called the project his "rawest and most vital" since Threadbare Alibis.

=== 2000–2007: Final years with Curb Records ===
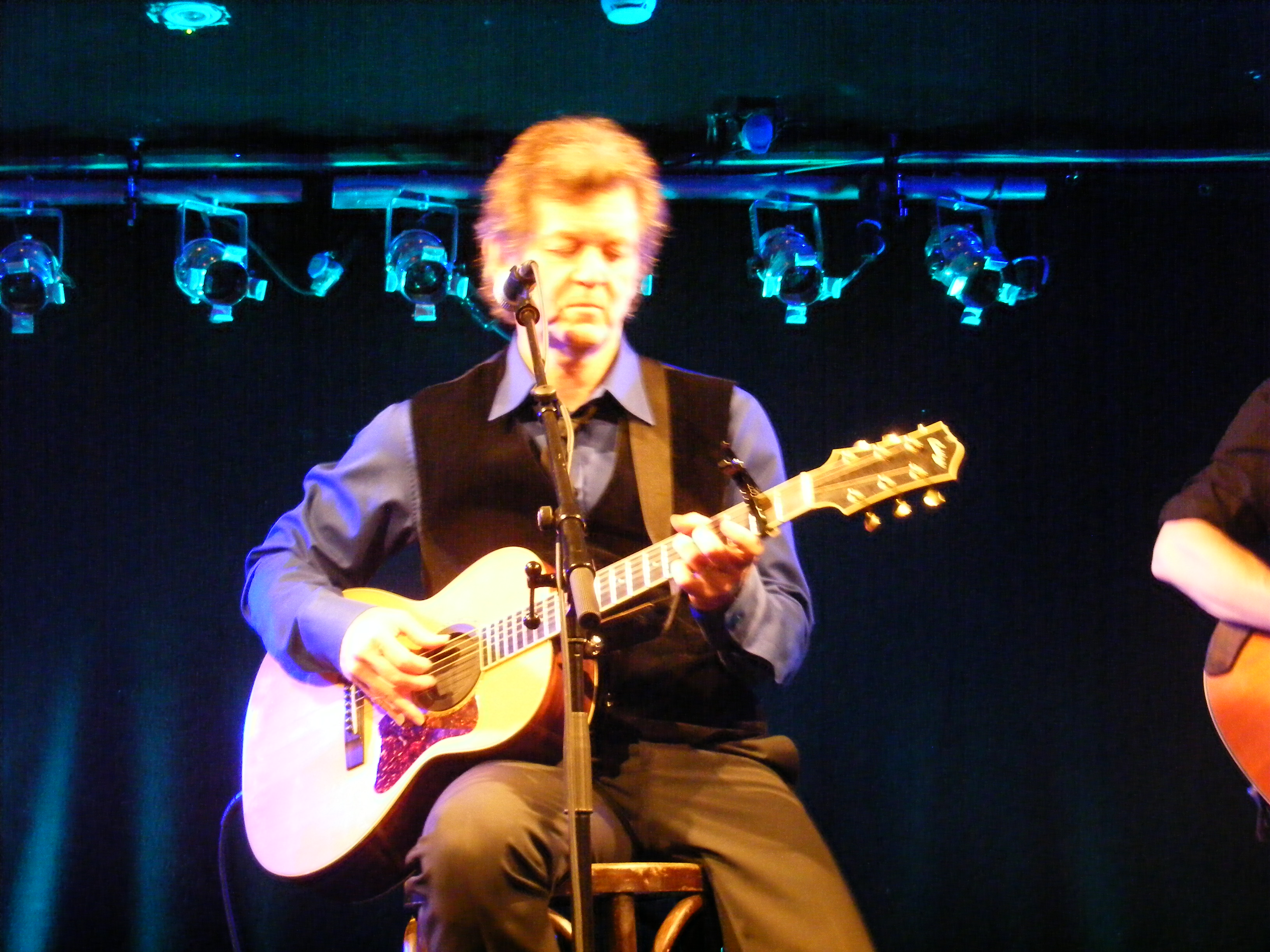
Rodney Crowell produced Ketchum's 2001 album Lucky Man.

Ketchum made his last appearance inside the top 40 of the country music charts with his 2000 release "She Is". The song was included on his sixth Curb album, Lucky Man, released in 2001. Singer-songwriter Rodney Crowell produced the album and wrote the track "Dreams of Martina", while the song "Two of the Lucky Ones" featured a duet vocal from Dolly Parton. Another track from the album was the Lisa Brokop duet "Keep Mom and Dad in Love". Curb Records released it as a single, alongside an alternate version recorded by Billy Dean, Suzy Bogguss, and Jillian Jacqueline on Dreamcatcher Records. While this version of the song charted, Ketchum and Brokop's did not. Other contributors to the album included John Cowan, Timothy B. Schmit, and Ricochet. Rick Bell of Country Standard Time praised the variety of collaborators and the "depth of songwriting", and considered "Dreams of Martina" the best-written song.

Next on Curb was 2003's The King of Love. Ketchum wrote or co-wrote all but one of fifteen songs on the album, and produced it by himself. The album included appearances by Tim O'Brien, Guy Clark, and Charlie Daniels, as well as a song written by his son Graham called "On Her Own Time". Afterward, he reunited with Reynolds for a recording session in mid-2004 that included "Forever Mine", a song written by Ketchum's then-wife Gina, and a cover of the Del McCoury Band's "My Love Will Not Change". The latter song was released as a single and reached number 60 on the country charts in 2004. Aubrie Sellers later covered the song with Steve Earle on her 2020 album Far from Home.

In 2006, Ketchum entered Hot Country Songs for the last time with "Just This Side of Heaven (Hal-lelujah)", which peaked at number 47. The song later appeared on an album titled One More Midnight, which was exclusively issued in the United Kingdom. He promoted the album by touring Ireland, being inspired to do so by his cover of Irish singer Mick Hanly. Despite this, he also played a number of concerts in the United States in 2007, but chose to perform only on weekends so he could spend the rest of the week with his family. Following in 2008 was his last Curb album, Father Time. He recorded the album in two days with no overdubbing or editing. He wrote all but one of the songs on the project, including "The Preacher and Me", the first song he ever wrote.

=== 2009–2020: I'm the Troubadour, retirement, and death ===
Ketchum took a hiatus from recording in 2009 after complications of multiple sclerosis, with which he had been originally diagnosed in 1999. This severely weakened the singer and resulted in bouts of depression, which he mitigated by moving to a cabin in Wimberley, Texas. After he felt he had regained enough strength to start performing again, he began writing song ideas down in a notebook with the intent of returning to music. He sent recordings to friends as he wanted to sign a new recording contract, which resulted in him signing with Austin-based independent label Music Road Records in 2014. This label released his next studio album, I'm the Troubadour, that same year. The album included a re-recording of "I Know Where Love Lives" featuring Tameca Jones on duet vocals.

Ketchum released no more albums after I'm the Troubadour, although he continued to tour and perform until 2018, when he held his last concert at Gruene Hall. On April 14, 2019, Ketchum's wife, Andrea, announced on his Facebook page that early-onset dementia had progressed to the point that he could no longer perform. Ketchum died at his home in Fischer, Texas, due to complications of dementia, on November 23, 2020, at the age of 67.

== Musical styles ==
Ketchum's music is defined by his folk music-styled songwriting, minimalist production, and vocal tone. AllMusic writer Sandra Brennan stated that he was "known for his succinct, often poignant songwriting style" and "emerged at the dawn of the 1990s with an engaging folk-driven sound". Ron Wynn, reviewing Past the Point of Rescue for the same site, wrote that Ketchum "writes simple, sometimes moving songs about relationships and/or life's dilemmas, and communicates them in an attractive, unadorned vocal package" and said that his "delivery, as well as the arrangements and sensibility, lean toward easy listening pop and light folk." Also reviewing the same album, Mike Curtin of The Post-Star described Ketchum as having a "plaintive tenor voice" with comparisons to Roy Orbison and Lyle Lovett. In The Encyclopedia of Country Music, Clark Parsons called Ketchum "a male version of Mary Chapin Carpenter: folk-tinged, intellectual, and honest." David J. Spatz, writing for the Press of Atlantic City, characterized Ketchum's voice as a "slightly gritty tenor" and noted that he usually recorded his vocals in only one take. He also made note of Ketchum's tendency to write his own songs, as well as his storytelling lyrics. Michael Corcoran of the Dallas Morning News thought Ketchum's voice had an "inherent smoothness"; both he and Jim Macnie of New Country also compared his voice to Lovett, with the latter also comparing "Small Town Saturday Night" to the work of Jesse Winchester. In a review of "Just This Side of Heaven" for Billboard, Deborah Evans Price wrote that Ketchum is "able to infuse any lyric with a sense of drama and urgency."

As the early years of his career were spent in Texas, Ketchum cited a number of singer-songwriters from that state as inspiration, such as Lovett, Jimmie Dale Gilmore, and Townes Van Zandt. Additionally, he stated in 2003 that he found reading to be an important part of his identity as a songwriter. Of the lyrical content of his songs, Country Universe writer Kevin John Coyne considered "Small Town Saturday Night" to be "rich with sharply drawn characters and scenarios". Spatz noted themes of "divergent aspirations of a young couple" in "Someplace Far Away", and thought that songs such as "Sure Love" had "memorable" lyrics. Similarly, Corcoran noted Ketchum's use of wordplay in "That's What I Get for Losin' You". Macnie thought the lyrics of "I Know Where Love Lives" showed a "populist" approach due to their "disdain for the privileged life". He also thought that Ketchum's use of a small backing band reflected an "unaffected" approach to his music. According to Rooney, Ketchum's recording sessions usually involved only three other musicians at a time, as opposed to other acts he worked with who often used as many as nine.

Regarding his physical appearance, Parsons noted the "sex appeal of his long salt-and-pepper mane", while Macnie wrote that he resembled "a mix of Jimmie Dale Gilmore and Don Johnson." Neil Pond of Country America characterized him as "dashingly handsome", and also noted that he had graying hair and "bushy eyebrows".

== Personal life ==
Ketchum's first marriage was to the former Barbara Schell. The couple had one daughter and three sons together. In 1991, he married the former Terrell Tye, and the two raised Ketchum's two younger sons while the older son and daughter resided in Texas. Ketchum married the former Gina Giglio on February 14, 1998, and the couple moved to Santa Fe, New Mexico, soon afterward. They had three daughters prior to their divorce. Lastly, he married the former Andrea Elston in 2015. After divorcing Ketchum, Tye worked as a song publisher in Nashville before dying of undisclosed causes in 2010.

In June 1998, Ketchum was diagnosed with transverse myelitis, a neurological disorder of the spinal column which left him without the use of the left side of his body. This required him to re-learn how to play guitar, and Ketchum later recalled he was "virtually paralyzed for about six weeks." He cited recovery from myelitis, along with his marriage to Giglio, as other factors that delayed the progress of his career in the late 1990s. Following his 1999 diagnosis of multiple sclerosis, he began corresponding with Montel Williams, who had also been diagnosed with the disease. This led to the two performing concerts together to raise money for a charity founded by Williams to sponsor multiple sclerosis research.

Ketchum was also a painter and often signed his paintings "Heck". His work has been displayed at Pena Gallery in Santa Fe, where he had an opening in 2002. He was also a master carpenter and enjoyed building toys and woodworking.

== Discography ==
Studio albums

- Threadbare Alibis (1989)
- Past the Point of Rescue (1991)
- Sure Love (1992)
- Every Little Word (1994)
- I Saw the Light (1998)
- Awaiting Redemption (1999)
- Lucky Man (2001)
- The King of Love (2003)
- One More Midnight (2007)
- Father Time (2008)
- I'm the Troubadour (2014)
