= Past the Point of Rescue (song) =

Single by Hal Ketchum

from the album Past the Point of Rescue
- Released: February 10, 1992
- Recorded: 1991
- Genre: Country
- Length: 4:25
- Label: Curb
- Songwriter: Mick Hanly
- Producers: Allen Reynolds; Jim Rooney

Hal Ketchum singles chronology
"I Know Where Love Lives" (1992)	"Past the Point of Rescue" (1992)	"Five O'Clock World" (1992)

"Past the Point of Rescue" is a song written by Mick Hanly, and covered by American country music artist Hal Ketchum. It was released in February 1992 as the third single and title track from Ketchum's album Past the Point of Rescue. It was written by Mick Hanly (of Moving Hearts) and had originally been recorded by Mary Black who had a hit with it in Ireland in 1988 and included it on her album No Frontiers. Ketchum's version of the song reached No. 2 on the Billboard Hot Country Singles & Tracks chart in May 1992 and No. 1 on the RPM Country Tracks chart in Canada.

== Music video ==
The music video was directed by Steve Boyle, and features Ketchum riding a motorcycle. It premiered on CMT on Valentine's Day, February 14, 1992.

== Cover versions ==
- "Past the Point of Rescue" has been recorded by several other artists, most notably the Dixie Chicks on their 1992 album Little Ol' Cowgirl.
- Norwegian country rock group Hellbillies has made a locally successful cover version featuring Norwegian lyrics about a reindeer hunter who gets lost in the mountain.
- Celtic Thunder covered the song for their 2012 album and DVD, Voyage.
- Karen Damen covered the song in 2020 with one of the contenders in the voice senior Belgium (Marie-Jeanne) shortly after the show's final.
- Bluegrass artist Tina Adair released the song on her self titled album in July 2021.
- The High Kings released a cover of this song alongside Mary Black in November 2024.

== Chart performance ==
Chart (1992)	Peak position
Canada Country Singles (RPM)	1
US Hot Country Songs (Billboard)	2

=== Year-end charts ===
Chart (1992)	Position
Canada Country Tracks (RPM)	34
US Country Songs (Billboard)	20
