= I Know Where Love Lives =

Single by Hal Ketchum

from the album Past the Point of Rescue
- B-side: "Long Day Comin'"
- Released: October 21, 1991
- Genre: Country
- Length: 3:30
- Label: Curb
- Songwriter: Hal Ketchum
- Producers: Allen Reynolds; Jim Rooney

Hal Ketchum singles chronology
| "Small Town Saturday Night" (1991) | "I Know Where Love Lives" (1991) | "Past the Point of Rescue" (1992) |

"I Know Where Love Lives" is a song written and recorded by American country music artist Hal Ketchum. It was released in October 1991 as the second single from his album Past the Point of Rescue. The song reached number 13 on the Billboard Hot Country Singles & Tracks chart in early 1992.

== Music video ==
The music video was directed by Richard Kooris and premiered in late 1991.

== Chart performance ==
| Chart (1991–1992) | Peak position |
|---|---|
| Canada Country Singles (RPM) | 15 |
| US Hot Country Songs (Billboard) | 13 |
