= Five O'Clock World =

1965 single by The Vogues

Single by The Vogues

from the album Five O'Clock World
- B-side: "Nothing to Offer You"
- Released: October 1965
- Genre: Folk rock; garage rock
- Length: 2:19
- Label: Co & Ce
- Songwriter: Allen Reynolds
- Producers: Nick Cenci; Tony Moon

The Vogues singles chronology
"You're the One" (1965)	"Five O'Clock World" (1965)	"Magic Town" (1966)

"Five O'Clock World"

Single by Hal Ketchum

from the album Past the Point of Rescue
- Released: May 25, 1992
- Genre: Country
- Length: 3:02
- Label: Curb
- Songwriter: Allen Reynolds
- Producers: Allen Reynolds; Jim Rooney

Hal Ketchum singles chronology
"Past the Point of Rescue" (1992)	"Five O'Clock World" (1992)	"Sure Love" (1992)

"Five O'Clock World" (also known as "5 O'Clock World") is a song written by Allen Reynolds and recorded by American vocal group the Vogues. It reached number 1 on WLS on 17 December 1965 and 7 January 1966, number 1 in Canada on the RPM singles chart on 10 January 1966 (their first of two chart-toppers there that year, followed by "Magic Town" in April), and number 4 in the U.S. on the Hot 100 on 15–22 January 1966 and is one of the Vogues' best-known hits, along with "You're the One".

== Arrangement ==
The Vogues recording begins with a repeating modal figure on 12-string acoustic guitar (the sound reminiscent of medieval chanson, or contemporaries the Byrds), and swings into stride with a low bass drone, and work-song shouts drenched in reverb. The baritone lead vocal by Bill Burkette is punctuated by counter-melodies and harmonies from the group and rises to a lilting yodel after the chorus, with crescendoing string instruments throughout, in anticipation of the after-work freedom promised in the lyric. The sound of a piano is heard, descending the scale, during the yodel. The sound of the other members of the Vogues can be heard repeating the word "up!" The instrumental track was a demo brought in by producer Tony Moon, cut at RCA Studio B in Nashville. The vocal was then overdubbed in Pittsburgh at Co & Ce studios, with label co-head Nick Cenci. Cenci and the group were unhappy with the drum track, which was then re-recorded using local Grains of Sand drummer, Rich Engler. Later, when the group was signed to Reprise, strings were added by arranger Ernie Freeman, overdubbed onto the original Co & Ce master.

== Personnel ==
- Bill Burkette – lead vocals
- Don Miller – backing vocals
- Hugh Geyer – backing vocals
- Chuck Blasko – backing vocals
- Chip Young – 12-string acoustic guitar
- David Briggs – keyboards
- Norbert Putnam – bass
- Jerry Carrigan – drums
- Rich Engler – drums

== Cover versions ==
- The song was also covered by new wave music group Ballistic Kisses and released as a 12-inch single in 1982. A shortened version was subsequently included on their debut album, Total Access. As with Cope's cover, some lyrics were changed to reflect views surrounding the Cold War.
- Julian Cope also released a cover of the song in 1989 on his album My Nation Underground; Cope changed several of the lyrics and added in a section from the Petula Clark song "I Know a Place". (Both songs were released in 1965.)
- American country music singer Hal Ketchum covered the song on his 1991 album Past the Point of Rescue (which the song's writer, Allen Reynolds, co-produced with Jim Rooney) and released it as a single. The song peaked at number 16 on the Hot Country Singles chart in 1992.
- Scottish rock band The Proclaimers covered the song for their 2003 album Born Innocent.
- It was also covered by Bowling for Soup for several episodes of The Drew Carey Show from 2002 to 2004 and included as a bonus track on some editions of their 2005 album Bowling for Soup Goes to the Movies.

== Chart history ==
=== The Vogues ===
Chart (1965–1966)	Peak position
Canadian RPM Top Singles	1
New Zealand (Listener)	2
US Billboard Hot 100	4
US Cash Box Top 100	3

=== Hal Ketchum ===
Chart (1992)	Peak position
Canada Country Singles (RPM)	21
US Hot Country Songs (Billboard)	16
