= That's What I Get for Losin' You =

Single by Hal Ketchum

from the album Every Little Word
- B-side: "Every Little Word"
- Released: September 24, 1994
- Genre: Country
- Length: 3:41
- Label: Curb
- Songwriter(s): Hal Ketchum, Al Anderson
- Producer(s): Allen Reynolds, Jim Rooney

Hal Ketchum singles chronology
"(Tonight We Just Might) Fall in Love Again" (1994)	"That's What I Get for Losin' You" (1994)	"Stay Forever" (1995)

"That's What I Get for Losin' You" is a song co-written and recorded by American country music artist Hal Ketchum. It was released in September 1994 as the second single from the album Every Little Word. The song reached #22 on the Billboard Hot Country Singles & Tracks chart. The song was written by Ketchum and Al Anderson.

== Chart performance ==
Chart (1994)	Peak position
US Hot Country Songs (Billboard)	22
Canadian RPM Country Tracks	23
