= Past the Point of Rescue =

Studio album by Hal Ketchum
- Released: May 7, 1991
- Studio: Jack's Tracks (Nashville, Tennessee)
- Genre: Country
- Length: 34:05
- Label: Curb
- Producer: Allen Reynolds; Jim Rooney

Hal Ketchum chronology
Threadbare Alibis (1988)	Past the Point of Rescue (1991)	Sure Love (1992)

Singles from Past the Point of Rescue
- 1. "Small Town Saturday Night" Released: April 16, 1991; 2. "I Know Where Love Lives" Released: October 21, 1991; 3. "Past the Point of Rescue" Released: February 10, 1992; 4. "Five O'Clock World" Released: May 25, 1992

Professional ratings
Review scores
Source	Rating
AllMusic	4.5/5 stars
Entertainment Weekly	A−

Past the Point of Rescue is the second studio album by American country music artist Hal Ketchum. His first major-label album, it was released in 1991 on Curb Records and has been certified gold by the RIAA. The album produced four singles for him on the Billboard Hot Country Singles & Tracks (now Hot Country Songs) charts between 1991 and 1992. In chronological order, these were "Small Town Saturday Night", "I Know Where Love Lives", "Past the Point of Rescue", and a cover of The Vogues' "Five O'Clock World"; respectively, these songs reached #2, #13, #2, and #16 on the country charts. "Past the Point of Rescue" has been recorded by several other artists, most notably the Dixie Chicks on their 1992 album Little Ol' Cowgirl.

== Track listing ==
No.	Title	Writer(s)	Length
1.	"Small Town Saturday Night"	Pat Alger, Hank DeVito	2:58
2.	"I Know Where Love Lives"	Hal Ketchum	3:30
3.	"Old Soldiers"	Ketchum, David Mallett	3:33
4.	"Somebody's Love"	Ketchum, Alger	3:09
5.	"Past the Point of Rescue"	Mick Hanly	4:25
6.	"Five O'Clock World"	Allen Reynolds	3:02
7.	"I Miss My Mary"	Ketchum	3:12
8.	"Don't Strike a Match (To the Book of Love)"	Ketchum, Alger	3:13
9.	"Long Day Comin'"	Ketchum, Gary Burr	3:43
10.	"She Found the Place"	Ketchum	3:11

== Personnel ==
- Richard Bennett – acoustic guitar
- Bruce Bouton – steel guitar
- Gary Burr – background vocals
- Dave Francis – background vocals
- Hal Ketchum – lead vocals, background vocals, acoustic guitar
- Chris Leuzinger – acoustic guitar, electric guitar
- Kathy Mattea – background vocals
- Allen Reynolds – background vocals
- Milton Sledge – drums
- Will Smith – autoharp
- Pete Wasner – keyboards
- Bob Wray – bass guitar

== Chart performance ==
Chart (1991)	Peak position
U.S. Billboard Top Country Albums	6
U.S. Billboard 200	45
U.S. Billboard Top Heatseekers	2

== Certifications ==
Region	Certification	Certified units/sales
United States (RIAA)	Gold	500,000^{^}
^{^} Shipments figures based on certification alone.
