= Paul Franklin (musician) =

American musician

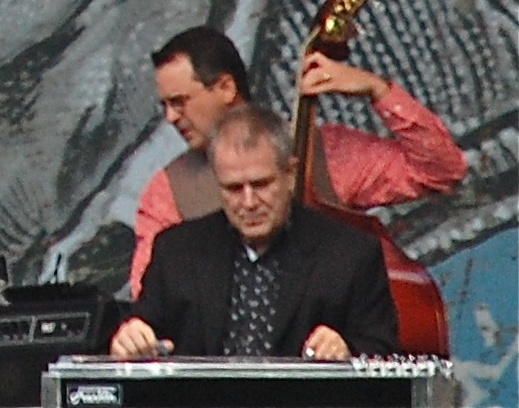
- Franklin performing in 2012

Background information
- Born: May 31, 1954 (age 72)
- Origin: Detroit, Michigan, U.S.
- Genres: Country, rock
- Occupation: Musician
- Instrument: Steel guitar
- Years active: 1970s–present
- Member of: The Time Jumpers

Paul V. Franklin (born May 31, 1954) is an American multi-instrumentalist, known mainly for his work as a steel guitarist. Beginning his career in the 1970s as a member of Barbara Mandrell's road band, he later toured with Vince Gill, Mel Tillis, Jerry Reed and Dire Straits, and is currently touring with Chris Stapleton. He has since become a prolific session musician in Nashville, playing on more than 500 albums. He has been named by the Academy of Country Music as Best Steel Guitarist on several occasions. He was inducted into the Steel Guitar Hall of Fame in 2000 and the Musicians Hall of Fame and Museum in 2019. With thirty three, Franklin is the most nominated person in CMA history and is notable for having been nominated for the Country Music Association Award for Musician of the Year thirty two times before finally winning for the first time on his 33rd nomination in 2025. At the 59th Annual CMA Awards held on November 19, 2025, Franklin received a standing ovation from the audience when his win was announced. Presenter Vince Gill, his longtime collaborator, introduced the award segment by noting that Franklin had been nominated more times than any other artist in any category in CMA history. Franklin, visibly emotional, dedicated the award to his father, who had invented the Pedabro. The win was widely covered in country music media as one of the most overdue recognitions in the genre's awards history. He has won eighteen Academy of Country Music Awards for his musicianship.

In addition to the pedal steel guitar and lap steel guitar, Franklin plays Dobro, fiddle, and drums, as well as three custom-built instruments called the Pedabro, The Box, and the baritone steel guitar. Since 2016 Franklin has been offering online steel guitar lessons.

Paul was inducted into the Michigan Country Music Hall of Fame on August 15, 2026, at Ford Field in Detroit, Michigan, on stage during the Chris Stapleton concert.

== Musical innovations ==
Franklin is noted for bringing multiple musical innovations to the country music scene. One, the Pedabro, invented by Franklin's father, is a type of Dobro fitted with pedals and played like a pedal steel guitar. The first of many hit records featuring the Pedabro was "Forever and Ever, Amen" by Randy Travis.

Franklin has also created two new varieties of steel guitar, the first being a type of lap steel nicknamed "The Box", whose sound has been described as a "swampy acoustic guitar". The other is the baritone steel guitar, the strings of which are tuned an octave lower than a traditional pedal steel guitar.

== Collaborations ==
He played steel guitar on the 1972 top-five hit "Nice to Be with You" by Gallery.

Franklin has worked with many well known acts during his career, including Mark Knopfler and Dire Straits, Barbara Mandrell, Rodney Crowell, Notting Hillbillies, Sting, Peter Frampton, George Strait, Alan Jackson, Faith Hill, Shania Twain, Barbra Streisand, Reba McEntire, Patty Loveless, Kathy Mattea, Big & Rich, Travis Tritt, Clint Black, Etta James, Jake Owen, Kane Brown, Kenny Rogers, Kid Rock, Lauren Alaina, Lee Ann Womack, Lionel Richie, Luke Bryan, Olivia Newton-John, Peter Cetera, Randy Travis, Ronnie Milsap, Sheryl Crow, Thomas Rhett, Tim McGraw, Toni Braxton, Trace Adkins, Vince Gill, Luke Combs, The Bellamy Brothers, Mark Chesnutt, George Fox, Collin Raye, John Michael Montgomery, David Lee Murphy, Lace, Toby Keith, Harry Connick Jr., Wynonna Judd, Mark Wills, Hal Ketchum, Jo Dee Messina, Aaron Tippin, George Jones, Carrie Underwood, Aaron Lewis, Willie Nelson, Easton Corbin, Troy Cassar-Daley, Billy Corgan, Clay Walker and Megadeth.

Franklin is a member of The Time Jumpers, a country and western swing band. In July 2013, he and Vince Gill released a collaborative album called Bakersfield.

== Discography ==
=== Studio albums ===
Title	Album details	Peak chart positions	
Title	Album details	US Country	US
Bakersfield (with Vince Gill)	Release date: July 30, 2013; Label: MCA Nashville; Formats: CD, LP, music download	4	25
Sweet Memories (with Vince Gill)	Release date: August 4, 2023; Label: MCA Nashville; Formats: CD, LP, music download	-	-
