= Sure Love (Hal Ketchum song) =

Single by Hal Ketchum

from the album Sure Love
- Released: September 21, 1992
- Genre: Country
- Length: 3:28
- Label: Curb
- Songwriters: Gary Burr; Hal Ketchum
- Producers: Allen Reynolds; Jim Rooney

Hal Ketchum singles chronology
"Five O'Clock World" (1992)	"Sure Love" (1992)	"Hearts Are Gonna Roll" (1993)

"Sure Love" is a song co-written and recorded by American country music artist Hal Ketchum. It was released in September 1992 as the first single and title track from his album Sure Love. The song reached number 3 on the Billboard Hot Country Singles & Tracks chart in January 1993. It was written by Ketchum and Gary Burr.

== Music video ==
The music video premiered on CMT on September 24, 1992, and was directed by Senor McGuire (who had previously filmed the video for "Small Town Saturday Night") and filmed in Memphis, Tennessee, it starts with a couple dancing on a balcony, the camera zooms out to reveal Ketchum walking in an alleyway with a guitar. The camera pans to Beale Street, where a fictitious movie "Hecks Romance" is playing at a theater while a couple get into a convertible, photos are being taken, and Ketchum sings and walks with his guitar as the camera follows. The camera pans to a secret club, where the rest of the song is performed by Ketchum and a full band, with people dancing in front. The video ends with Ketchum and his guitar walking down a dimly lit street. The first shot of the video starting on the balcony and going all the way to the band performance is one continuous shot that lasts 2 full minutes.

== Chart performance ==
Chart (1992–1993)	Peak position
Canada Country Singles (RPM)	5
US Hot Country Songs (Billboard)	3

=== Year-end charts ===
Chart (1993)	Position
Canada Country Tracks (RPM)	89
