= Hearts Are Gonna Roll =

1993 single by Hal Ketchum

Single by Hal Ketchum

from the album Sure Love
- Released: February 15, 1993
- Genre: Country
- Length: 3:05
- Label: Curb
- Songwriters: Hal Ketchum; Ronny Scaife
- Producers: Allen Reynolds; Jim Rooney

Hal Ketchum singles chronology
"Sure Love" (1992)	"Hearts Are Gonna Roll" (1993)	"Mama Knows the Highway" (1993)

"Hearts Are Gonna Roll" is a song co-written and recorded by American country music artist Hal Ketchum. It was released in February 1993 as the second single from his album Sure Love. The song reached number 2 on the Billboard Hot Country Singles & Tracks chart in May 1993. It was written by Ketchum and Ronny Scaife.

== Chart performance ==
"Hearts Are Gonna Roll" debuted at number 63 on the U.S. Billboard Hot Country Singles & Tracks for the week of February 20, 1993.

Chart (1993)	Peak position
Canada Country Singles (RPM)	5
US Hot Country Songs (Billboard)	2

=== Year-end charts ===
Chart (1993)	Position
Canada Country Tracks (RPM)	77
US Country Songs (Billboard)	25
