= Someplace Far Away (Careful What You're Dreaming) =

Single by Hal Ketchum

from the album Sure Love
- Released: September 13, 1993
- Genre: Country
- Length: 4:04
- Label: Curb
- Songwriter: Hal Ketchum
- Producers: Allen Reynolds; Jim Rooney

Hal Ketchum singles chronology
"Mama Knows the Highway" (1993)	"Someplace Far Away (Careful What You're Dreaming)" (1993)	"(Tonight We Just Might) Fall in Love Again" (1994)

"Someplace Far Away (Careful What You're Dreaming)" is a song written and recorded by American country music artist Hal Ketchum. He originally recorded it in 1989 for his debut album Threadbare Alibis. It was later re-recorded for his third album, Sure Love, from which it was issued as a single in 1993. The song reached number 24 on the Billboard Hot Country Singles & Tracks chart but it peaked at number 6 on the Canadian RPM Country Tracks.

== Chart performance ==
"Someplace Far Away (Careful What You're Dreaming)" debuted on the U.S. Billboard Hot Country Singles & Tracks for the week of September 18, 1993.

Chart (1993–1994)	Peak position
Canada Country Singles (RPM)	6
US Hot Country Songs (Billboard)	24
