= I Saw the Light (Todd Rundgren song) =

Single by Todd Rundgren

from the album Something/Anything?
- B-side: "Marlene"
- Released: March 1972
- Recorded: Late 1971
- Genre: Pop; power pop; soft rock; Merseybeat
- Length: 2:59
- Label: Bearsville
- Songwriter: Todd Rundgren
- Producer: Todd Rundgren

Todd Rundgren singles chronology
"A Long Time, A Long Way to Go" (1971)	"I Saw the Light" (1972)	"Couldn't I Just Tell You" (1972)

"I Saw the Light" is a song written and performed by American musician Todd Rundgren that was released as the opening track from his 1972 album Something/Anything? In the album's liner notes, Rundgren states that he intended the song to be the hit of the album, and copied the Motown tradition of putting hit songs at the beginning of albums.

== Background ==
Rundgren wrote the track in 20 minutes, a feat he attributes to his reliance on stimulants such as Ritalin. "It caused me to crank out songs at an incredible pace. You can see why, too, the rhymes are just moon/June/spoon kind of stuff."

== Personnel ==
- Todd Rundgren – all instruments and vocals

== Charts ==
Weekly charts

1972 singles charts
Chart	Peak
Australia (Kent Music Report)	21
Canada RPM 100 Singles	15
UK (OCC)	36
US Billboard Hot 100	16
US Billboard Easy Listening	12
US Cash Box Top 100	11
US Record World Singles Chart	15

Year-end charts

Chart (1972)	Rank
U.S. Billboard Hot 100	88

== Cover versions ==
- 1972 – The New Seekers, on the Circles album
- 1985 – Yukihiro Takahashi, on Once a Fool
- 1984 – Herman Brood, on The Brood (as "Eyes")
- 1987 – Mood Six, "I Saw the Light" (a video for the song was shown on MTV's 120 Minutes)
- 1989 – Workshy, on The Golden Mile.
- 1997 – Terry Hall, Laugh (released as a single)
- 1997 – Lori Carson, on Everything I Touch Runs Wild
- 1998 – Hal Ketchum. This version reached No. 36 on the US country charts, and No. 50 on the Canadian country charts.
- 2012 – Yo La Tengo, on Super Hits of the Seventies (also released on deluxe versions of their Fade)
- 2015 – Jason Schwartzman, Rashida Jones, Maya Rudolph, David Johansen and Bill Murray, on A Very Murray Christmas
