= Al Anderson (NRBQ) =

American guitarist, singer, and songwriter (born 1947)

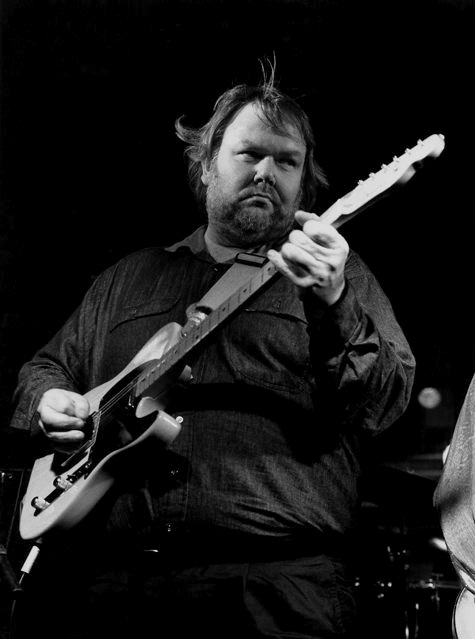

Background information
- Also known as: Big Al Anderson
- Born: Alan Gordon Anderson; July 26, 1947 (age 78); Windsor, Connecticut, United States
- Genres: Rock, country
- Occupation: Singer-songwriter
- Instruments: Vocals, guitar
- Years active: 1966–present
- Formerly of: NRBQ

Alan Gordon Anderson (born July 26, 1947) is an American guitarist, singer, and songwriter. In the 1960s, Anderson was the frontman of Connecticut-based band the Wildweeds, whose song "No Good To Cry" (written by Anderson) was a regional success in 1967. From December 1971 until December 1993, he was the lead guitarist in the band NRBQ, and released several solo albums. He also played electric guitar on Jonathan Edwards's 1973 album Have a Good Time for Me.

In the 1990s, Anderson's career shifted from touring musician to country music songwriter, settling in Nashville and writing hit songs for such artists as Carlene Carter, Vince Gill, Diamond Rio and Trisha Yearwood, as well as Tim McGraw's number 1 hit "The Cowboy in Me" and several album cuts. Anderson also reunited onstage with NRBQ on occasion, for 30th anniversary shows in 1999, and at reunion concerts held in Northampton, Massachusetts with all past and present members of the band in 2004 and 2007. He has released six solo albums, the most recent in 2012.

== Discography ==
=== Albums ===
- Al Anderson (Vanguard Records, 1972)
- Party Favors (Rykodisc, 1988)
- Pay Before You Pump (Imprint Records, 1996)
- After Hours (Legacy, 2006)
- Pawn Shop Guitars (AAM Records, 2007)
- Strings (Amigo Grande, 2012)

=== Singles ===
Year	Single	Peak chart positions	Album
Year	Single	US	Album
1973	"We'll Make Love"	101	Al Anderson

== List of country singles composed by Anderson ==
Anderson has written or co-written the following country singles:

- Alabama (with Jann Arden), "Will You Marry Me"
- Jimmy Buffett (with Kenny Chesney), "License to Chill"
- Jimmy Buffett (with Martina McBride), "Trip Around the Sun"
- Carlene Carter, "Every Little Thing"
- Linda Davis, "A Love Story in the Making"
- Diamond Rio, "Unbelievable"
- Joe Diffie, "Poor Me"
- Ty England, "Should've Asked Her Faster"
- The Farm, "Every Time I Fall in Love"
- 4 Runner, "Forrest County Line"
- Vince Gill, "Next Big Thing" "Down to My Last Bad Habit"
- Hot Apple Pie, "We're Makin' Up"
- Hal Ketchum, "(Tonight We Just Might) Fall in Love Again", "That's What I Get for Losin' You"
- Patty Loveless, "The Last Thing on My Mind"
- Raul Malo, "Crying For You"
- The Mavericks (with Flaco Jiménez), "All You Ever Do Is Bring Me Down"
- Delbert McClinton & Dick50, "When She Cries at Night"
- Tim McGraw, "The Cowboy in Me"
- Nitty Gritty Dirt Band, "Bang, Bang, Bang"
- The Oak Ridge Boys, "Bad Case of Missing You"
- James Otto, "Groovy Little Summer Song"
- Bonnie Raitt, "Not Cause I Wanted To", "Ain't Gonna Let You Go", both on the album Slipstream
- LeAnn Rimes, "Big Deal"
- Jeffrey Steele, "Somethin' in the Water"
- George Strait, "Love's Gonna Make It Alright"
- Aaron Tippin, "Without Your Love"
- Mike Walker, "Honey Do"
- Lari White, "Wild at Heart"
- Trisha Yearwood, "Powerful Thing"
