= Small Town Saturday Night (song) =

Single by Hal Ketchum

from the album Past the Point of Rescue
- B-side: "Don't Strike a Match"
- Released: April 16, 1991
- Genre: Country
- Length: 2:58
- Label: Curb
- Songwriter(s): Pat Alger; Hank DeVito
- Producer(s): Allen Reynolds; Jim Rooney

Hal Ketchum singles chronology
"Small Town Saturday Night" (1991)	"I Know Where Love Lives" (1991)

"Small Town Saturday Night" is a song written by Pat Alger and Hank DeVito, and recorded by American country music artist Hal Ketchum. It was released in April 1991 as the first single from his debut album Past the Point of Rescue. The song reached No. 2 on the Billboard Hot Country Singles & Tracks chart in August 1991.

== Content ==
The song is an uptempo that describes what occurs on a Saturday night in a small town. The song was inspired by the city of New Braunfels, Texas.

== Music video ==
The music video was directed by Senor McGuire and premiered in mid-1991. It is entirely in black-and-white, and shows the singer in a forest, singing beneath a screen showing The Terror of Tiny Town (1938). In the end, a horse dances with the singer.

== Chart performance ==
Chart (1991)	Peak position
US Hot Country Songs (Billboard)	2

=== Year-end charts ===
Chart (1991)	Position
US Country Songs (Billboard)	40

== Certifications ==
Region	Certification	Certified units/sales
United States (RIAA)	Gold	500,000^{‡}
^{‡} Sales+streaming figures based on certification alone.
