= Restless Heart discography =

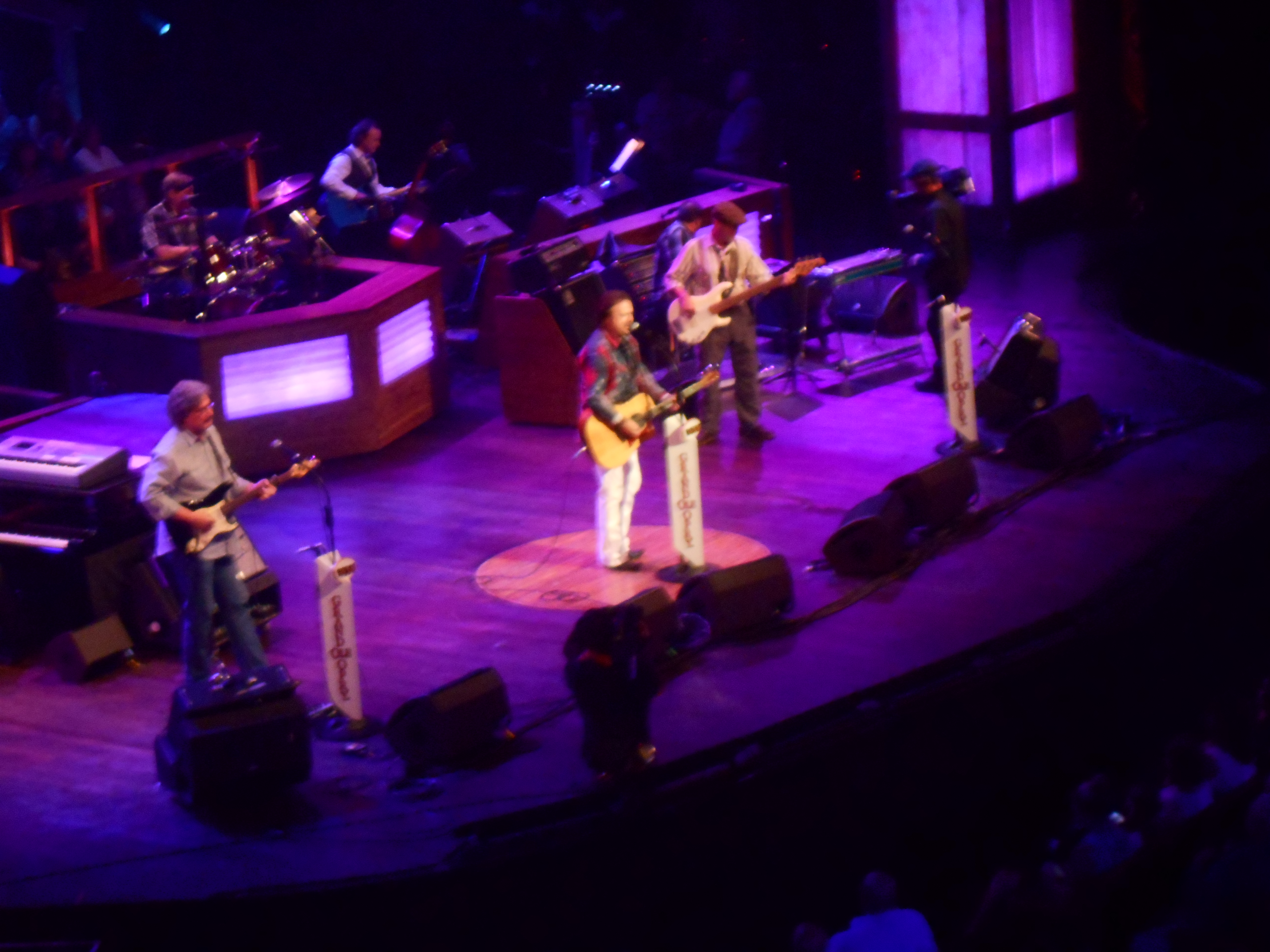
- Restless Heart performing in 2014.
- Studio albums: 8
- Live albums: 2
- Compilation albums: 7
- Singles: 31
- Music videos: 17

Restless Heart was an American country music band founded in 1984 by John Dittrich, Paul Gregg, Dave Innis, Greg Jennings, and Larry Stewart. Active from 1984 to 1994, in 1998, and from 2002 onward, the band has released eight studio albums, seven compilation albums, and two live albums. Its second through fifth studio albums—Wheels, Big Dreams in a Small Town, Fast Movin' Train, and Big Iron Horses—have all been certified gold by the Recording Industry Association of America (RIAA).

Restless Heart has also charted six number one singles on the Hot Country Songs chart: "That Rock Won't Roll", "I'll Still Be Loving You", "Why Does It Have to Be (Wrong or Right)", "Wheels", "The Bluest Eyes in Texas", and "A Tender Lie". Besides these songs, the band has nine other top ten singles on that chart. Two of the band's singles—"I'll Still Be Loving You" and "When She Cries"—both reached the top 40 on the Billboard Hot 100.

== Studio albums ==
Title	Album details	Peak positions			Certifications (sales thresholds)
Title	Album details	US Country	US	CAN Country	Certifications (sales thresholds)
Restless Heart	Release date: March 25, 1985; Label: RCA Nashville; Formats: LP, CD, cassette	10	—	—	
Wheels	Release date: October 31, 1986; Label: RCA Nashville; Formats: LP, CD, cassette	1	73	—	US: Gold
Big Dreams in a Small Town	Release date: July 15, 1988; Label: RCA Nashville; Formats: LP, CD, cassette	4	114	—	US: Gold
Fast Movin' Train	Release date: January 4, 1990; Label: RCA Nashville; Formats: LP, CD, cassette	6	78	—	US: Gold
Big Iron Horses	Release date: October 9, 1992; Label: RCA Nashville; Formats: CD, cassette	26	116	1	US: Gold
Matters of the Heart	Release date: May 24, 1994; Label: RCA Nashville; Formats: CD, cassette	—	—	—	
Still Restless	Release date: November 9, 2004; Label: Audium/Koch Records; Formats: CD, music download	—	—	—	
A Restless Heart Christmas	Release date: October 29, 2013; Label: Red River Entertainment; Formats: CD, music download	—	—	—	
"—" denotes releases that did not chart

== Compilation albums ==
Title	Album details	Peak positions		
Title	Album details	US Country	US	CAN Country
The Best of Restless Heart	Release date: October 22, 1991; Label: RCA Nashville; Formats: CD, cassette	25	144	30
Big Dreams: The Encore Collection	Release date: April 8, 1997; Label: BMG Special Products; Formats: CD, cassette	—	—	—
Greatest Hits	Release date: May 19, 1998; Label: RCA Nashville; Formats: CD, cassette, Digital Download	47	—	—
RCA Country Legends	Release date: March 4, 2003; Label: RCA Nashville; Formats: CD, music download	—	—	—
All-American Country	Release date: April 12, 2005; Label: Collectables Records; Formats: CD, music download	—	—	—
Super Hits	Release date: September 25, 2007; Label: Legacy; Formats: CD, music download	—	—	—
Playlist: The Very Best of Restless Heart	Release date: May 21, 2013; Label: RCA Nashville/Legacy; Formats: CD, music download	—	—	—
"—" denotes releases that did not chart

== Live albums ==
Title	Album details
25 and Live	Release date: 2007; Label: self-released; Formats: CD, music download
Greatest Hits: Live	Release date: April 21, 2009; Label: Country Roads; Formats: CD, music download

== Singles ==
=== 1980s ===
Year	Single	Peak positions				Album
Year	Single	US Country	US	US AC	CAN Country	Album
1985	"Let the Heartache Ride"	23	—	—	20	Restless Heart
1985	"I Want Everyone to Cry"	10	—	—	9	Restless Heart
1985	"(Back to the) Heartbreak Kid"	7	—	—	2	Restless Heart
1986	"Til I Loved You"	10	—	33 (Note: "Til I Loved You" charted on Adult Contemporary in 1992 as a single from The Best of Restless Heart.)	11	Restless Heart
1986	"That Rock Won't Roll"	1	—	—	2	Wheels
1987	"I'll Still Be Loving You"	1	33	3	1	Wheels
1987	"Why Does It Have to Be (Wrong or Right)"	1	—	11	1	Wheels
1987	"Wheels"	1	—	—	1	Wheels
1987	"New York (Hold Her Tight)" (Note: B-side of "Wheels".)	—	—	23	—	Wheels
1988	"The Bluest Eyes in Texas"	1	—	—	2	Big Dreams in a Small Town
1988	"A Tender Lie"	1	—	—	2	Big Dreams in a Small Town
1989	"Big Dreams in a Small Town"	3	—	—	5	Big Dreams in a Small Town
1989	"Say What's in Your Heart"	4	—	—	1	Big Dreams in a Small Town
1989	"Fast Movin' Train"	4	—	—	3	Fast Movin' Train
"—" denotes releases that did not chart

=== 1990s–2010s ===
Year	Single	Peak positions								Album
Year	Single	US Country	US	US AC	US Pop	AUS	CAN Country	CAN	CAN AC	Album
1990	"Dancy's Dream"	5	—	—	—	—	4	—	—	Fast Movin' Train
1990	"When Somebody Loves You"	21	—	—	—	—	17	—	—	Fast Movin' Train
1990	"Long Lost Friend"	16	—	—	—	—	6	—	—	Fast Movin' Train
1991	"You Can Depend on Me"	3	—	—	—	—	21	—	—	The Best of Restless Heart
1992	"Familiar Pain"	40	—	—	—	—	40	—	—	The Best of Restless Heart
1992	"When She Cries"	9	11	2	4	97	9	6	29	Big Iron Horses
1993	"Mending Fences"	13	—	—	—	—	3	—	—	Big Iron Horses
1993	"Tell Me What You Dream" (with Warren Hill) (Note: "Tell Me What You Dream" is only available on the 1993 re-release of Big Iron Horses.)	—	43	1	38	—	—	14	1	Big Iron Horses
1993	"We Got the Love"	11	—	—	—	—	25	—	—	Big Iron Horses
1993	"Big Iron Horses"	72	—	—	—	—	50	—	—	Big Iron Horses
1994	"Baby Needs New Shoes"	52	—	—	—	—	54	—	—	Matters of the Heart
1998	"No End to This Road"	33	—	—	—	—	47	—	—	Greatest Hits
1998	"For Lack of Better Words"	64	—	—	—	—	86	—	—	Greatest Hits
2004	"Torch of Freedom"	—	—	—	—	—	—	—	—	—N/a
2004	"Feel My Way to You"	29	—	—	—	—	—	—	—	Still Restless
2013	"Home"	—	—	—	—	—	—	—	—	Playlist: The Very Best of Restless Heart
2016	"Wichita Lineman"	—	—	—	—	—	—	—	—	—N/a
"—" denotes releases that did not chart

=== As a featured artist ===
Year	Single	Album
1994	"Amazing Grace" (with the Maverick Choir)	Maverick

== Other charted songs ==
Year	Single	Peak positions	Album
Year	Single	US Country	Album
1999	"The Little Drummer Boy"	58	Country Christmas Classics

== Videography ==
=== Music videos ===
Year	Title	Director
1985	"(Back to The) Heartbreak Kid"	Stephen Buck
1987	"Why Does It Have to Be (Wrong or Right)"	George Bloom III
1988	"The Bluest Eyes in Texas"	Bill Balsley
1988	"A Tender Lie"	George Bloom III
1989	"Big Dreams in a Small Town"	Bill Balsley
1989	"Say What's in Your Heart"	Bill Balsley
1989	"Fast Movin' Train"	Jay Brown
1990	"Dancy's Dream"	John Lloyd Miller
1991	"Long Lost Friend" (live)	
1992	"When She Cries"	Wayne Miller
1993	"Mending Fences"	Michael Merriman
1993	"Big Iron Horses"	D. J. Webster
1993	"Tell Me What You Dream" (with Warren Hill)	Daniela Federici
1994	"Baby Needs New Shoes"	Alan Chebot
1994	"Amazing Grace" (The Maverick Choir)	Gil Bettman
2003	"Torch of Freedom"	Alin Bijan
2013	"Home"	Erin Neathery
2016	"Wichita Lineman"	Mark Mayr

== Album appearances ==
Year	Title	Album
1987	"Don't Ask the Reason Why"	The Secret of My Succe$s
1994	"Maverick"	Maverick
