= Greatest Hits (Restless Heart album) =

Greatest hits album by Restless Heart
- Released: May 19, 1998
- Studios: Arrowhead Studios (Franklin, Tennessee); The Work Station (Nashville, Tennessee)
- Genre: Country
- Length: 61:47
- Label: RCA Nashville
- Producers: Various original producers; compilation produced by Scott Hendricks and Tim DuBois

Restless Heart chronology
Matters of the Heart (1994)	Greatest Hits (1998)	Still Restless (2004)

Professional ratings
Review scores
Source	Rating
Allmusic	4.5/5 stars

Greatest Hits is the second compilation album by American country music group Restless Heart. It was released by RCA Nashville in 1998. "No End to This Road" and "For Lack of Better Words", two tracks new to this album, were released as singles, and "Somebody's Gonna Get That Girl" is new to this album as well. The album reached #47 on the Top Country Albums chart. Prior to the release of this album, the band had been disbanded since 1994. This album reunited all of the members save for keyboardist Dave Innis, and after its release, Restless Heart disbanded again until 2004's Still Restless.

== Track listing ==
No.	Title	Writer(s)	Length
1.	"No End to This Road"	Kent Blazy, Neil Thrasher, Michael Dulaney	3:24
2.	"Let the Heartache Ride"	Van Stephenson, Tim DuBois, Dave Robbins	3:39
3.	"(Back to The) Heartbreak Kid"	Stephenson, DuBois	3:53
4.	"That Rock Won't Roll"	Bob DiPiero, John Scott Sherrill	3:31
5.	"I'll Still Be Loving You"	Todd Cerney, Mary Ann Kennedy, Pam Rose, Pat Bunch	4:19
6.	"Why Does It Have to Be (Wrong or Right)"	Randy Sharp, Donny Lowery	3:01
7.	"The Bluest Eyes in Texas"	Stephenson, DuBois, Robbins	4:47
8.	"A Tender Lie"	Sharp	3:29
9.	"Big Dreams in a Small Town"	Stephenson, DuBois, Robbins	3:35
10.	"Fast Movin' Train"	Dave Loggins	4:24
11.	"Dancy's Dream"	DuBois, Greg Jennings, Monty Powell	4:02
12.	"Long Lost Friend"	Larry Stewart, Steve Bogard, Robbins	3:53
13.	"When She Cries"	Marc Beeson, Sonny LeMaire	3:45
14.	"Tell Me What You Dream" (with Warren Hill)	Josh Leo, Vince Melamed, Timothy B. Schmit	4:44
15.	"For Lack of Better Words"	Joie Scott, Kim Tribble	3:43
16.	"Somebody's Gonna Get That Girl"	Beeson, LeMaire, Joanie Chappel-Beeson	3:35

== Personnel ==
On "No End to This Road", "For Lack of Better Words", and "Somebody's Gonna Get That Girl":

Restless Heart

- John Dittrich – vocals
- Paul Gregg – vocals
- Greg Jennings – acoustic guitar, electric guitar, vocals
- Larry Stewart – lead vocals

Additional musicians

- Bill Cuomo – keyboards
- John Barlow Jarvis – keyboards
- Michael Rhodes – bass
- Greg Morrow – drums

== Production ==
- Tim DuBois – compilation producer, producer (1–12, 15, 16)
- Scott Hendricks – compilation producer, producer (1–12, 15, 16)
- Restless Heart – producers (4–14)
- Josh Leo – producer (13, 14)
- Susan Eaddy – art direction
- Julie Wanca – design
- Peter Nash – photography
- Glen Rose – studio photography
- Bill Simmons for Fitzgerald/Hartley Co. – management

Technical credits

- Denny Purcell – mastering at Georgetown Masters (Nashville, Tennessee)

Tracks 1, 15 & 16

- Mike Clute – recording
- Scott Hendricks – overdub recording
- John Kunz – overdub recording
- John Guess – mixing
- Mike Hanson – recording assistant
- Chris Rowe – mix assistant
- Shawn Simpson – mix assistant

== Chart performance ==
Chart (1998)	Peak position
U.S. Billboard Top Country Albums	47
