= The Best of Restless Heart =

Greatest hits album by Restless Heart
- Released: October 22, 1991
- Studios: Emerald Sound Studios and Sound Emporium Studios (Nashville, Tennessee); Sigma Sound Studios (New York City, New York)
- Genre: Country
- Length: 37:01
- Label: RCA Nashville
- Producers: Tim DuBois Scott Hendricks Restless Heart Josh Leo Larry Lee

Restless Heart chronology
Fast Movin' Train (1990)	The Best of Restless Heart (1991)	Big Iron Horses (1992)

Singles from The Best of Restless Heart
- 1. "You Can Depend on Me" Released: October 7, 1991; 2. "Familiar Pain" Released: February 29, 1992

Professional ratings
Review scores
Source	Rating
Allmusic	4.5/5 stars

The Best of Restless Heart is the first compilation album by American country music group Restless Heart. It was released by RCA Nashville in 1991. "You Can Depend on Me" and "Familiar Pain" were released as singles. The album reached #25 on the Top Country Albums chart.

== Track listing ==
No.	Title	Writer(s)	Length
1.	"You Can Depend on Me"	Jimmy Griffin, Ronnie Rogers	2:38
2.	"Fast Movin' Train"	Dave Loggins	4:24
3.	"A Tender Lie"	Randy Sharp	3:28
4.	"Wheels"	Loggins	3:45
5.	"The Bluest Eyes in Texas"	Van Stephenson, Tim DuBois, Dave Robbins	4:45
6.	"Familiar Pain"	Walt Aldridge, Susan Longacre	4:20
7.	"That Rock Won't Roll"	Bob DiPiero, John Scott Sherrill	3:27
8.	"Til I Loved You"	Stephenson, Robbins, Jeff Silbar	2:59
9.	"Why Does It Have to Be (Wrong or Right)"	Sharp, Danny Lowery	2:58
10.	"I'll Still Be Loving You"	Todd Cerney, Mary Ann Kennedy, Pam Rose, Pat Bunch	4:17

== Personnel on tracks 1 and 6 ==
Restless Heart

- John Dittrich – drums, percussion, vocals
- Paul Gregg – bass, vocals
- David Innis – keyboards, vocals
- Greg Jennings – guitars, vocals
- Larry Stewart – lead vocals

Additional Musicians

- Rusty Young – steel guitar

== Production ==
- Josh Leo – producer (1, 6)
- Larry Lee – producer (1, 6)
- Restless Heart – producers (2–5, 7–10)
- Tim DuBois – producer (2–5, 7–10)
- Scott Hendricks – producer (2–5, 7–10)
- Barbara Behler – production assistant (1, 6)
- Mary Hamilton – art direction
- Bill Brunt Designs – design
- Randee St. Nicholas – band photography
- Fitzgerald/Hartley Co. – management

Technical credits

- Denny Purcell – mastering at Georgetown Masters (Nashville, Tennessee)
- Steve Marcantonio – recording (1, 6), mixing (1, 6)
- Gary Hellman – remixing (8)
- John Luongo – remixing (8)
- Linelle – assistant engineer (1, 6)
- Paula Montonado – assistant engineer (1, 6)
- Danny Mormando – assistant engineer (8)

== Chart performance ==
Chart (1991)	Peak position
U.S. Billboard Top Country Albums	25
U.S. Billboard 200	144
Canadian RPM Country Albums	30
