= Still Restless =

Studio album by Restless Heart
- Released: November 9, 2004
- Genre: Country
- Length: 36:55
- Label: Koch
- Producer: Kyle Lehning; Mac McAnally

Restless Heart chronology
Greatest Hits (1998)	Still Restless (2004)	25 and Live (2007)

Singles from Still Restless
- 1. "Feel My Way to You" Released: July 24, 2004

Professional ratings
Review scores
Source	Rating
Allmusic -	3.5/5 stars

Still Restless is the ninth and final studio album by American country music band Restless Heart. Released in 2004, it was considered the band's reunion album, as it was their first release since 1998's Greatest Hits, as well as the first album since Fast Movin' Train (1990) to feature all five original band members. Their first and only album for Koch Records Nashville, it produced only one single, "Feel My Way to You", which peaked at #29 on the Billboard Hot Country Singles & Tracks (now Hot Country Songs) charts in late 2004. Though the band was active for 17 years following the album's release, they would not follow it up with another studio album.

== Making of the album ==
With the exception of a brief reunion for a greatest hits compilation in 1998, Restless Heart had not been active since disbanding in 1994. Still Restless served as the band's reunion album, bringing back all five original members: lead singer Larry Stewart, drummer John Dittrich, bassist Paul Gregg, guitarist Greg Jennings, and pianist/keyboardist Dave Innis. It was the band's first album of all-new material since 1994's Matters of the Heart. In addition, it was the first album to feature the complete five-piece lineup since Fast Movin' Train (1990), as Stewart and Innis had departed in 1991 and 1992, respectively.

According to Stewart, the album was more than one year in the making. Initially, they had planned to work with Tim DuBois and Scott Hendricks, who had produced virtually all of Restless Heart's previous albums. Both producers declined, however, as they had "their own things going". Eventually, two producers were chosen for Still Restless: Mac McAnally, a prominent session instrumentalist and songwriter who has worked with Sawyer Brown and Jimmy Buffett, and Kyle Lehning, who had produced for Randy Travis. McAnally also performed several instruments and sang background vocals on the album.

== Song details ==
Three of the album's eleven tracks were written by Mac McAnally, and all three had been previously recorded by him as well: "Down the Road" from Simple Life (1990), "Miracle" from 1994's Knots, and "Looking Back" from 1999's Word of Mouth. "Down the Road" was also a minor chart single for McAnally in late 1990, peaking at #70 on the Billboard country music charts. McAnally charted again with the song in 2008, this time as a duet with Kenny Chesney. "Every Fire" was previously recorded by Jason Sellers on his 1999 album A Matter of Time, and before that by Shenandoah on their 1994 album In the Vicinity of the Heart. Sellers also co-wrote the track "Makin' Hay", which Clay Davidson previously released from his 2000 debut album Unconditional.

A cover of The Beatles' "The Night Before" is also included on this album. This song was chosen by Jennings, who wanted to include "a fun cover". Initially, according to Dittrich, the band had difficulty making a satisfactory recording of the song, until McAnally began playing the song at a slightly faster tempo on his 12-string guitar, and then invited the band to join him.

Only one song was released as a single: "Feel My Way to You", the first track. Restless Heart's first Top 40 chart single since 1998's "No End to This Road", this song peaked at number 29 on the Billboard country charts. No additional singles were released from the album, due to the closure of Koch Records' Nashville division in early 2005.

== Track listing ==
No.	Title	Writer(s)	Length
1.	"Feel My Way to You"	Jennifer Schot, Danny Orton	3:30
2.	"Down the Road"	Mac McAnally	2:54
3.	"Same Boat Now"	Austin Cunningham, Lance Miller, Larry Williams	3:26
4.	"Looking Back"	McAnally	3:32
5.	"And More"	Larry Stewart, Allison Mellon	3:35
6.	"Makin' Hay"	Marcus Hummon, Jason Sellers	2:57
7.	"Every Fire"	John Scott Sherrill, Cathy Majeski	3:46
8.	"Yesterday's News"	Stewart, Greg Jennings, Wayne Kirkpatrick	3:15
9.	"Miracle"	McAnally	3:45
10.	"The Night Before"	John Lennon, Paul McCartney	2:18
11.	"What We Know Now"	Stewart, Steve Bogard, Dave Robbins	3:57

== Personnel ==
Compiled from liner notes.

Restless Heart

- John Dittrich – drums, vocals
- Paul Gregg – bass, vocals
- Greg Jennings – acoustic guitar, electric guitar, mandolin, Papoose
- Dave Innis – acoustic piano, organ, clavinet, Rhodes piano, Wurlitzer electric piano
- Larry Stewart – guitar, vocals

Lead vocal by Larry Stewart on all tracks except John Dittrich on "Looking Back" and "The Night Before", and Paul Gregg on "Yesterday's News".

Additional musicians

- Mac McAnally – acoustic piano, acoustic guitar, Papoose, mandola, vocals
- Jerry Douglas – Dobro
- Dan Dugmore – pedal steel guitar
- Doyle Grisham – pedal steel guitar
- Eric Darken – percussion
- Jonathan Yudkin – fiddle
- Larry Hall – strings, string arrangements

Production

- Kyle Lehning – producer, mixing
- Mac McAnally – producer
- Alan Schulman – engineer
- Chris Stone – engineer
- Casey Wood – engineer, mixing, mix assistant, overdub engineer
- Greg Jennings – overdub engineer
- Jason Lehning – overdub engineer
- Jim DeMain – mastering
- Glenn Sweitzer – art direction, design
- John Scarpati – photography
