= When Somebody Loves You (Restless Heart song) =

Single by Restless Heart

from the album Fast Movin' Train
- B-side: "A Little More Coal on the Fire"
- Released: September 1, 1990
- Genre: Country
- Length: 3:37
- Label: RCA Nashville
- Songwriters: Johnny Neel, Rick Giles
- Producers: Scott Hendricks, Tim DuBois, Restless Heart

Restless Heart singles chronology
"Dancy's Dream" (1990)	"When Somebody Loves You" (1990)	"Long Lost Friend" (1991)

"When Somebody Loves You" is a song written by Johnny Neel and Rick Giles, and recorded by American country music group Restless Heart. It was released in September 1990 as the third single from the album Fast Movin' Train. The song reached number 21 on the Billboard Hot Country Singles & Tracks chart, becoming their first single since "Let the Heartache Ride" not to reach Top 10.

== Chart performance ==
Chart (1990)	Peak position
Canada Country Singles (RPM)	17
US Hot Country Songs (Billboard)	21
