= I Want Everyone to Cry =

Single by Restless Heart

from the album Restless Heart
- B-side: "She's Coming Home"
- Released: May 20, 1985
- Genre: Country
- Length: 3:30
- Label: RCA Nashville
- Songwriter(s): Wood Newton, Michael Noble
- Producer(s): Tim DuBois, Scott Hendricks

Restless Heart singles chronology
"Let the Heartache Ride" (1985)	"I Want Everyone to Cry" (1985)	"(Back to The) Heartbreak Kid" (1985)

"I Want Everyone to Cry" is a song written by Wood Newton and Michael Noble, and originally recorded by B. J. Thomas on his 1984 album Shining. The song was later recorded by American country music group Restless Heart and released in May 1985 as the second single from the album Restless Heart. The song reached number 10 on the Billboard Hot Country Singles & Tracks chart.

== Chart performance ==
Chart (1985)	Peak position
US Hot Country Songs (Billboard)	10
Canadian RPM Country Tracks	9
