= Say What's in Your Heart =

Single by Restless Heart

from the album Big Dreams in a Small Town
- B-side: "Jenny Come Back"
- Released: July 1989
- Genre: Country
- Length: 4:05
- Label: RCA Nashville
- Songwriters: Donny Lowery; Don Schlitz
- Producers: Tim DuBois; Scott Hendricks; Restless Heart

Restless Heart singles chronology
"Big Dreams in a Small Town" (1989)	"Say What's in Your Heart" (1989)	"Fast Movin' Train" (1989)

"Say What's in Your Heart" is a song written by Donny Lowery and Don Schlitz, and recorded by American country music group Restless Heart. It was released in July 1989 as the fourth and final single from their album Big Dreams in a Small Town. The song reached number 4 on the Billboard Hot Country Singles chart in October 1989 and number 1 on the RPM Country Tracks chart in Canada.

== Music video ==
The music video was directed by Bill Balsley and premiered in mid-1989.

== Chart performance ==
Chart (1989)	Peak position
Canada Country Singles (RPM)	1
US Hot Country Songs (Billboard)	4

=== Year-end charts ===
Chart (1989)	Position
Canada Country Tracks (RPM)	33
US Country Songs (Billboard)	59
