= You Can Depend on Me =

You Can Depend on Me may refer to:

- "(You Can) Depend on Me," a 1959 song by Smokey Robinson and the Miracles
- "You Can Depend on Me" (Louis Armstrong song), 1931, also recorded by Brenda Lee in 1961
- "You Can Depend on Me" (Restless Heart song), 1991
