= Wheels (The Bellamy Brothers song) =

Single by Restless Heart

from the album Wheels
- B-side: "New York (Hold Her Tight)"
- Released: October 26, 1987
- Genre: Country rock
- Length: 3:48
- Label: RCA Nashville
- Songwriter(s): Dave Loggins
- Producer(s): Tim DuBois; Scott Hendricks; Restless Heart

Restless Heart singles chronology
"Why Does It Have to Be (Wrong or Right)" (1987)	"Wheels" (1987)	"The Bluest Eyes in Texas" (1988)

"Wheels" is a song written by Dave Loggins, and originally recorded by American country music duo The Bellamy Brothers for their 1985 album Howard & David. It was later recorded by American country music group Restless Heart and released in October 1987 as the fourth and final single from the album Wheels. The song was Restless Heart's fourth number-one country single. The single went to number one for one week and spent 23 weeks on the chart.

The B-side, "New York (Hold Her Tight)", peaked at number 23 on the Adult Contemporary chart.

== Charts ==
=== Weekly charts ===
Chart (1987–1988)	Peak position
US Hot Country Songs (Billboard)	1
Canadian RPM Country Tracks	1

=== Year-end charts ===
Chart (1988)	Position
Canadian RPM Country Tracks	27
US Hot Country Songs (Billboard)	63
