= Big Dreams in a Small Town =

Studio album by Restless Heart
- Released: July 15, 1988
- Studios: Digital Recorders and OmniSound Studios (Nashville, Tennessee); The Castle (Franklin, Tennessee)
- Genre: Country
- Length: 37:53
- Label: RCA Nashville
- Producers: Tim DuBois Scott Hendricks Restless Heart

Restless Heart chronology
Wheels (1986)	Big Dreams in a Small Town (1988)	Fast Movin' Train (1990)

Singles from Big Dreams in a Small Town
- 1. "The Bluest Eyes in Texas" Released: May 13, 1988; 2. "A Tender Lie" Released: September 1988; 3. "Big Dreams in a Small Town" Released: February 1989; 4. "Say What's in Your Heart" Released: July 1989

Professional ratings
Review scores
Source	Rating
Allmusic	3/5 stars

Big Dreams in a Small Town is the third studio album by American country music group Restless Heart. It was released by RCA Nashville in July 1988. The songs:"The Bluest Eyes in Texas," the title track "A Tender Lie," and "Say What's in Your Heart" were all released as singles prior to the album.

The album reached number 4 on the Top Country Albums chart and has been certified Gold by the RIAA.

== Track listing ==
No.	Title	Writer(s)	Length
1.	"Say What's in Your Heart"	Donny Lowery, Don Schlitz	4:05
2.	"Big Dreams in a Small Town"	Van Stephenson, Tim DuBois, Dave Robbins	3:35
3.	"A Tender Lie"	Randy Sharp	3:29
4.	"Jenny Come Back"	Stephenson, T. DuBois, Robbins	3:49
5.	"No Way Out"	Steve Bogard, Rick Giles	3:11
6.	"Carved in Stone"	Tony Colton, Michael Noble	4:02
7.	"El Dorado"	Nicky Gregg, Paul Gregg, Greg Jennings	5:10
8.	"The Bluest Eyes in Texas"	Stephenson, T. DuBois, Robbins	4:46
9.	"This Time"	Bob Farrell, P. Gregg, Robbins	3:32
10.	"Calm Before the Storm"	Farrell, Stephenson, Robbins	4:07
11.	"The Ride of Your Life"	John Dittrich, James DuBois	4:47

== Personnel ==
Restless Heart

- John Dittrich – drums, vocals, lead vocals (10)
- Paul Gregg – bass, vocals, lead vocals (6, 7)
- Dave Innis – keyboards, vocals
- Greg Jennings – guitars, vocals
- Larry Stewart – vocals, lead vocals (1–6, 8, 9, 11)

Additional musicians

- Carl Marsh – Fairlight programming
- David Humphreys – Fairlight programming

== Production ==
- Joe Galante – A&R direction
- Restless Heart – producers
- Tim DuBois – producer
- Scott Hendricks – producer, recording, mixing, mastering
- J. T. Cantwell – assistant engineer
- Chris Hammond – assistant engineer
- Mark Nevers – assistant engineer
- Eric Paul – assistant engineer
- Tom Singers – assistant engineer
- Carry Summers – assistant engineer
- Bill Whittington – assistant engineer
- Carlos Grier – digital editing
- Denny Purcell – mastering
- Georgetown Masters (Nashville, Tennessee) – mastering location
- Mary Hamilton – art direction
- Bob McConnell – design
- Empire Studios – photography
- Mary Beth Felts – hair, make-up
- Vanessa Ware – stylist
- Fitzgerald/Hartley Co. – management

== Charts ==
=== Weekly charts ===
Chart (1988)	Peak position
US Billboard 200	114
US Top Country Albums (Billboard)	4

=== Year-end charts ===
Chart (1988)	Position
US Top Country Albums (Billboard)	57
Chart (1989)	Position
US Top Country Albums (Billboard)	21
