= Long Lost Friend (song) =

Single by Restless Heart

from the album Fast Movin' Train
- B-side: "I've Never Been So Sure"
- Released: January 7, 1991
- Genre: Country
- Length: 3:53
- Label: RCA Nashville
- Songwriters: Larry Stewart; Steve Bogard; Dave Robbins
- Producers: Tim DuBois; Scott Hendricks; Restless Heart

Restless Heart singles chronology
"When Somebody Loves You" (1990)	"Long Lost Friend" (1991)	"You Can Depend on Me" (1991)

"Long Lost Friend" is a song recorded by American country music group Restless Heart. It was released in January 1991 as the fourth and final single from the album Fast Movin' Train. The song reached number 16 on the Billboard Hot Country Singles & Tracks chart. It also peaked at number 6 on the Canadian RPM Country Tracks. The band's lead singer, Larry Stewart, wrote it with Steve Bogard and Dave Robbins.

== Chart performance ==
Chart (1991)	Peak position
Canada Country Singles (RPM)	6
US Hot Country Songs (Billboard)	16

=== Year-end charts ===
Chart (1991)	Position
Canada Country Tracks (RPM)	60
