= Wheels (Restless Heart album) =

Studio album by Restless Heart
- Released: October 31, 1986
- Studios: The Bennett House and The Castle (Franklin, Tennessee); Sound Stage Studios and OmniSound Studios (Nashville, Tennessee)
- Genre: Country
- Length: 36:35
- Label: RCA Nashville
- Producers: Tim DuBois; Scott Hendricks; Restless Heart

Restless Heart chronology
Restless Heart (1985)	Wheels (1986)	Big Dreams in a Small Town (1988)

Singles from Wheels
- 1. "That Rock Won't Roll" Released: August 9, 1986; 2. "I'll Still Be Loving You" Released: January 1987; 3. "Why Does It Have to Be (Wrong or Right)" Released: April 1987; 4. "Wheels" Released: October 26, 1987

Professional ratings
Review scores
Source	Rating
Allmusic	4.5/5 stars

Wheels is the second studio album by the American country music group Restless Heart. It was released by RCA Nashville in October 1986. "That Rock Won't Roll", "I'll Still Be Loving You" (#33 US Top 100), "New York (Hold Her Tight)", "Why Does It Have to Be (Wrong or Right)" and the title track were released as singles. The album reached #1 on the Top Country Albums chart and has been certified Gold by the RIAA.

== Track listing ==
No.	Title	Writer(s)	Length
1.	"Wheels"	Dave Loggins	3:48
2.	"That Rock Won't Roll"	Bob DiPiero, John Scott Sherrill	3:31
3.	"I'll Still Be Loving You"	Todd Cerney, Mary Ann Kennedy, Pam Rose, Pat Bunch	4:18
4.	"Why Does It Have to Be (Wrong or Right)"	Randy Sharp, Donny Lowery	3:00
5.	"Hummingbird"	Tim DuBois, Greg Jennings	2:59
6.	"The Boy's on a Roll"	DuBois, Paul Gregg, Dave Innis	4:00
7.	"Hard Time"	Larry Stewart, DuBois, Michael Noble	3:37
8.	"Victim of the Game"	DuBois, Gregg, Jennings	3:48
9.	"New York (Hold Her Tight)"	Van Stephenson, Austin Roberts	3:44
10.	"We Owned This Town"	DuBois, Gregg, Jennings	4:09

== Personnel ==
Restless Heart

- John Dittrich – drums, vocals
- Paul Gregg – bass, vocals
- Dave Innis – keyboards, vocals
- Greg Jennings – guitars, vocals
- Larry Stewart – lead vocals, string arrangements (9)

Additional Musicians

- Hollis Halford – Synclavier
- Mart Morse – Synclavier
- Ray Christensen – cello (9)
- Gary Vanosdale – viola (9)
- George Binkley III – violin (9)
- Carl Gorodetzky – violin (9)
- Tim DuBois – string arrangements (9)
- Scott Hendricks – string arrangements (9)
- Alan Moore – string arrangements (9)

== Production ==
- Restless Heart – producers
- Tim DuBois – producer
- Scott Hendricks – producer, recording, mixing, mastering
- Barry Beckett – production assistance (6)
- Mark Behling – assistant engineer
- J. T. Cantwell – assistant engineer
- Chris Hammond – assistant engineer
- Daniel Johnston – assistant engineer
- Bill Whittington – assistant engineer
- Chuck Ainlay – mix assistant
- Keith Odle – mix assistant
- Carlos Grier – mastering
- Denny Purcell – mastering
- Georgetown Masters (Nashville, Tennessee) – mastering location
- Ted Jensen – mastering original CD pressing
- Bill Brunt – art direction
- Greg Gorman – photography
- Charles McCallen – photo tinting
- Fitzgerald/Hartley Co. – management

== Chart performance ==
Chart (1986)	Peak position
U.S. Billboard Top Country Albums	1
U.S. Billboard 200	73
