= Restless Heart =

American country music band

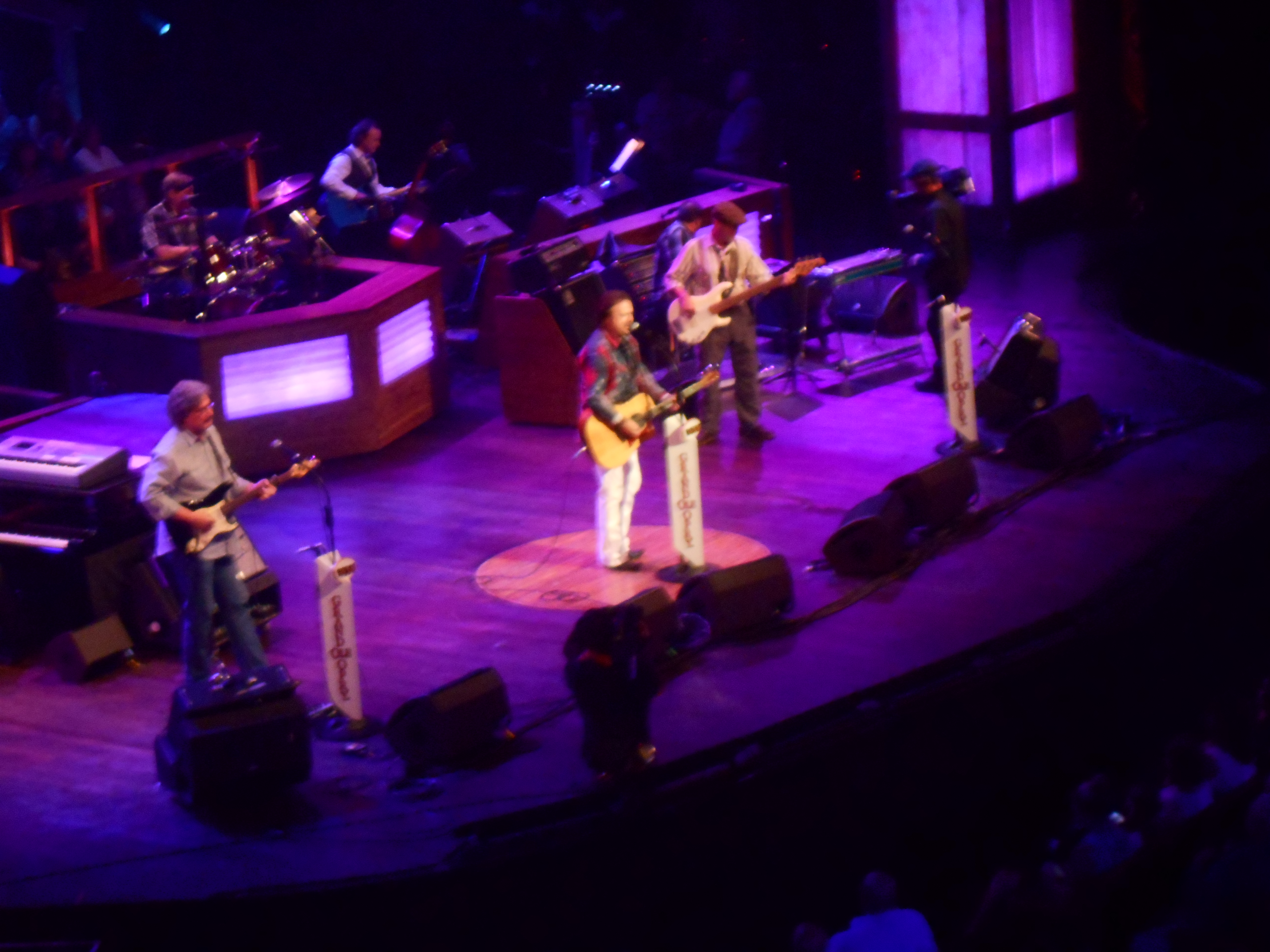
- Restless Heart performing at the Grand Ole Opry on August 9, 2014

Background information
- Origin: Nashville, Tennessee, U.S.
- Genres: Country; country pop
- Works: Restless Heart discography
- Years active: 1984–1995; 1998; 2001–2021
- Labels: RCA Nashville; Koch Nashville
- Spinoffs: The Buffalo Club; The Frontmen
- Past members: John Dittrich; Paul Gregg; Dave Innis; Greg Jennings; Larry Stewart

Restless Heart was an American country music band from Nashville, Tennessee. The band's longest-tenured lineup consisted of Larry Stewart (lead vocals, rhythm guitar), John Dittrich (drums, vocals), Paul Gregg (bass guitar, vocals), Dave Innis (keyboards, vocals), and Greg Jennings (lead guitar, mandolin, vocals). Record producer Tim DuBois assembled the band in 1984 to record demos and chose Verlon Thompson as the original lead singer, but Thompson was replaced by Stewart in this role before the band had recorded any material. Between 1984 and 1998, Restless Heart recorded for RCA Records Nashville. They released the albums Restless Heart, Wheels, Big Dreams in a Small Town, and Fast Movin' Train in the 1980s.

Stewart departed for a solo career in late 1991, shortly before the band's fifth studio album Big Iron Horses; the other four members began alternating on lead vocals in his absence. Innis also left before 1993's Matters of the Heart, by which point keyboardist Dwain Rowe and guitarist Chris Hicks were added to their touring lineup. Restless Heart announced a hiatus in 1995, with Stewart continuing to record as a solo artist, Jennings joining Vince Gill's touring band, and Dittrich forming the Buffalo Club. Stewart, Jennings, Dittrich, and Gregg briefly reunited for a tour and greatest-hits album in 1998 before disbanding a second time. They and Innis re-established the band's full lineup in 2001, after which they resumed touring and released their final studio album Still Restless in 2004. The band continued to tour and perform until quietly disbanding in 2021, shortly after Stewart began touring as a member of the Frontmen.

Restless Heart has released seven studio albums and two greatest-hits albums. Their second through fifth albums are all certified gold by the Recording Industry Association of America. 26 of their singles have entered the Billboard Hot Country Songs charts, including six that reached number one: "That Rock Won't Roll", "I'll Still Be Loving You", "Why Does It Have to Be (Wrong or Right)", "Wheels", "The Bluest Eyes in Texas", and "A Tender Lie". The band has also had crossover success on the Billboard Hot 100 and Adult Contemporary charts, including a collaboration with saxophonist Warren Hill on "Tell Me What You Dream", which was a number one single on the latter. Restless Heart's sound is defined by their country pop arrangements and vocal harmony, with many critics comparing them favorably to the Eagles.

== History ==
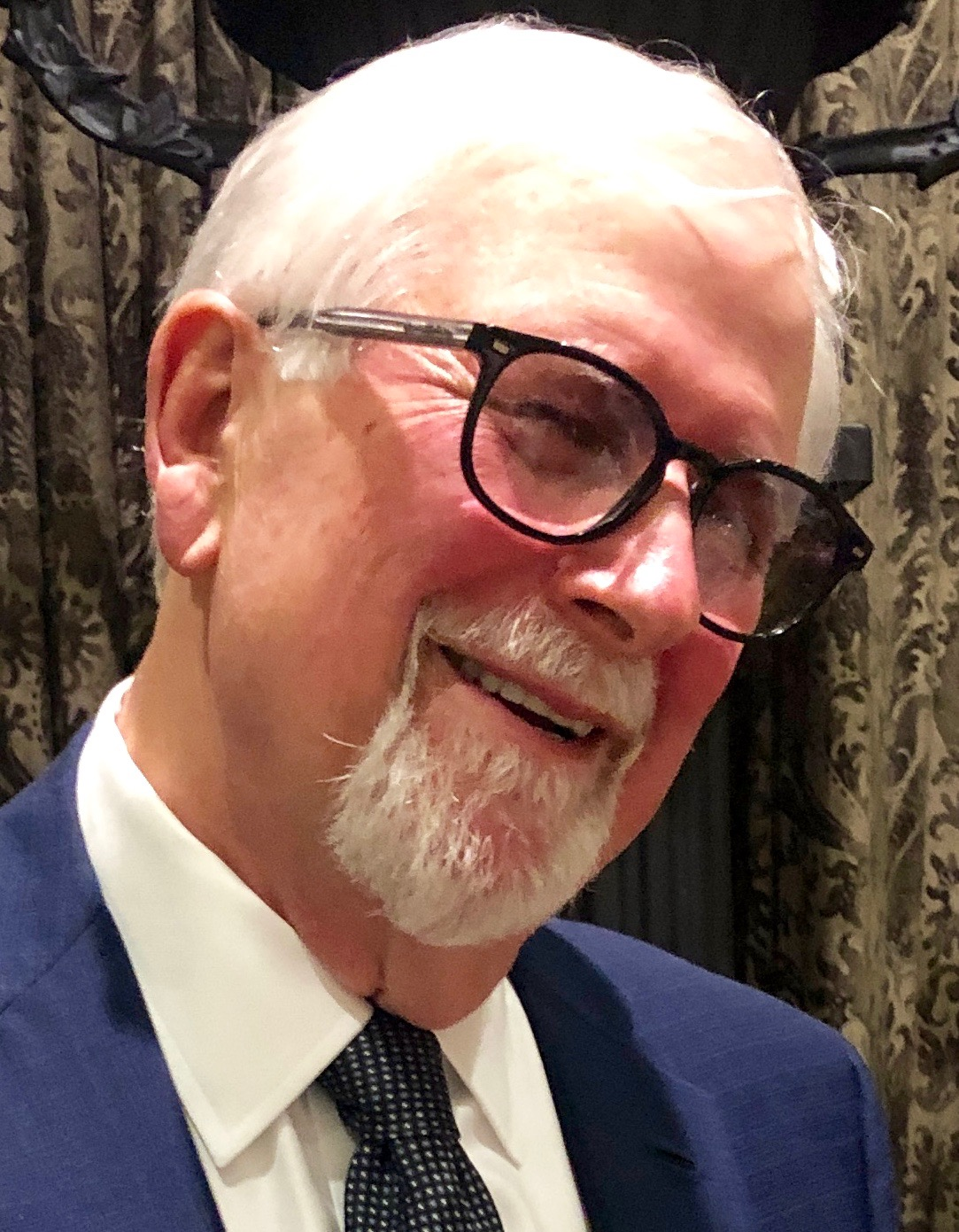
Record executive Tim DuBois assembled Restless Heart in 1984.

=== Formation and early years ===
Tim DuBois, a Nashville, Tennessee-based record producer, songwriter, and industry executive, assembled the band in 1984 to record demos of songs he had written. The members he chose were drummer John Dittrich, bass guitarist Paul Gregg, keyboardist Dave Innis, guitarist and mandolinist Greg Jennings, and lead singer Verlon Thompson. All five members had experience as country music session musicians or touring musicians. In particular, Innis had played on various demos for DuBois prior to his decision to create a band, and Dittrich had been a backing musician for Gail Davies. Jennings and DuBois had known each other from attending Oklahoma State University in the 1970s; the two were also classmates of Scott Hendricks, who would serve as the band's sound engineer in addition to co-producing with DuBois.

Thompson left before the band had officially been named or released a single because he did not feel comfortable with the country pop style that DuBois wanted the band to pursue. Replacing him on lead vocals was Larry Stewart, a college friend of Innis's. At the time, Stewart was working as a demo vocalist, in addition to working in the stockrooms of the Country Music Hall of Fame and mowing lawns at the Nashville offices of Broadcast Music, Inc. (BMI). After leaving the group, Thompson recorded both by himself and in collaboration with Guy Clark, in addition to writing several country hit singles in the 1990s. Stewart initially refused to join the band, as he did not think he was capable of serving as a lead singer; he rejected DuBois's offers to join the band twice before consulting with his mother and his fiancée, both of whom encouraged him to join. The band then began rehearsing and recording demos with Stewart on lead vocals. As they had not officially selected a name yet, they referred to themselves as the Okie Project, due to three of the members and Hendricks all being natives of Oklahoma. One of the demos they recorded was for "Love in the First Degree", later a hit for Alabama. Due to the success of the demos, the members chose to become an official band, and they were signed to RCA Records Nashville in 1984.

Despite being signed, the band had yet to select a name. DuBois insisted the band members come up with a name before they released a single. He asked the members to submit potential names, which resulted in a list with "about fifty" entries; after this, he locked all five members in an office for seven hours until they agreed on a name. They narrowed the list down to five entries, on which they then voted by using a five-point scale, with five points for the names they liked most and one point for the ones they liked the least. This initially led to the name Heartbreak Kid getting the most votes, but after DuBois asked the band members if they were certain they liked the name, they voted a second time and chose the name Restless Heart due to it receiving one more point than the others. Once they had assumed the name Restless Heart, the band members began working on recording an album with DuBois and Hendricks as producers.

=== 1984–1986: Restless Heart ===
After assuming the name Restless Heart, the band released its self-titled debut album on RCA Nashville in 1985. It charted four singles on Billboard Hot Country Songs: "Let the Heartache Ride", "I Want Everyone to Cry", "(Back to the) Heartbreak Kid" (previously recorded by Kathy Mattea on her self-titled debut album), and "Til I Loved You." DuBois co-wrote "Let the Heartache Ride" and "(Back to the) Heartbreak Kid" with Van Stephenson. According to Jennings, some stations refused to play "Let the Heartache Ride" due to its more country rock sound at a time when neotraditional country was beginning to rise in popularity. John Wooley of the Tulsa World reviewed the album favorably, praising the "intricate, tight harmonies and crisp instrumentation." After "I Want Everyone to Cry" became the band's first top-ten hit, DuBois and RCA promoted the band through radio showcases and music video rotation. This included a video for "(Back to the) Heartbreak Kid", which aired on VH-1. DuBois felt that touring was not a financial necessity for the band at the time, due to all five members also being session musicians and having songwriting contracts with Warner Music Group at the time. While under such a contract, Innis co-wrote "Dare Me", a hit single for the Pointer Sisters.

=== 1986–1988: Wheels ===
Despite DuBois's statements about touring, the band began doing so in 1986. One of their first concerts was with Rita Coolidge in Tulsa, Oklahoma. Also that year, RCA released the band's second album Wheels. All four singles from the album went to number one on the country music charts. First was "That Rock Won't Roll", a song which Innis had initially thought was "too pop" to be a hit single on country radio until the song reached number one. The follow-up single "I'll Still Be Loving You" was a song that had been originally offered to Kenny Rogers, who turned it down. It was band's second number-one country hit and their first song to be successful outside the country music charts. The song peaked at number 33 on the Billboard Hot 100, making it the first country song to be a top 40 pop hit since Willie Nelson and Julio Iglesias' "To All the Girls I've Loved Before" in early 1984. Additionally, "I'll Still Be Loving You" reached number three on the Adult Contemporary charts.

Released third and also reaching number one on the Billboard country charts was "Why Does It Have to Be (Wrong or Right)", co-written by Randy Sharp. This song had been rejected from the first album and had originally been rejected from Wheels as well, due to the band considering it too similar in sound to Exile. RCA executives insisted that the band record the song anyway in order to provide more up-tempo material for the album, and Gregg threatened to quit unless they recorded it. This song was a minor adult contemporary hit as well. "Hummingbird", the B-side of "Why Does It Have to Be (Wrong or Right)", was later recorded by Ricky Skaggs on his 1989 album Kentucky Thunder and was a top 20 country hit for him in 1990. The fourth and final country single from Wheels was the title track, which topped the country charts in 1987. This song was written by Dave Loggins and originally recorded by the Bellamy Brothers on their 1985 album Howard & David. The B-side, "New York (Hold Her Tight)", accounted for Restless Heart's third chart entry on Billboard's Adult Contemporary chart.

Wheels had favorable critical and commercial reception. James M. Tarbox of Knight Ridder thought the songs were stronger than those of the debut album, highlighting "Victim of the Game" and "New York (Hold Her Tight)" in particular. Tom Roland of AllMusic later wrote that "[t]he guys found their niche with this project. Big, overpowering sound, heavy backbeats, and very tight harmonies are here." In the Virgin Encyclopedia of Country Music, Colin Larkin noted that "I'll Still Be Loving You" became a popular song for fans to play at their weddings. The song was nominated at the 30th Annual Grammy Awards in 1988, in the category of Best Country Performance by a Duo or Group with Vocal. This nomination led to the band performing the song on the awards telecast. On March 2, 1988, Wheels was certified gold by the Recording Industry Association of America (RIAA) for shipments of 500,000 copies in the United States. Also during this timespan, the band contributed the song "Don't Ask the Reason Why" to the soundtrack of the 1987 movie The Secret of My Success. Restless Heart's tour schedule at this point included concerts with other RCA Nashville artists such as Alabama, Juice Newton, Eddie Rabbitt, and Earl Thomas Conley.

=== 1988–1990: Big Dreams in a Small Town and Fast Movin' Train ===
The band's third album, Big Dreams in a Small Town, came in 1988. From it came two more number one singles: "The Bluest Eyes in Texas" and "A Tender Lie", as well as top-five hits in its title track and "Say What's in Your Heart". This album was also the first to feature members other than Stewart on lead vocals: Gregg sang "El Dorado" and shared lead vocals with Stewart on "Carved in Stone", while Dittrich sang "Calm Before the Storm". The band members wrote some of the songs themselves and played all the instruments except for Fairlight CMI synthesizers, which were programmed by Carl Marsh and David Humphreys. DuBois co-wrote "The Bluest Eyes in Texas" with Van Stephenson and Dave Robbins, who would later become members of the country band Blackhawk in the early 1990s. The band members agreed to record the song because they had not previously recorded a song about the state of Texas and thought doing so would be appealing to fans from that state. People gave the album a positive review, noting the band's musicianship and prominent vocal harmony, as well as the "considerable amount of passion" in their music relative to their contemporaries. Writing for The Miami News, Mario Tarradell praised Stewart's "conviction" on the title track and "gentle delivery" on "The Bluest Eyes in Texas", as well as the variety in tempo and arrangement between individual tracks. The band supported this album by touring with Alabama and the Judds, both of whom were also on RCA at the time. The album accounted for the band's second Grammy nomination in the category of Best Country Performance by a Duo or Group with Vocal in 1989, while its title track was nominated in the same category a year later.

Restless Heart's fourth album, Fast Movin' Train, was released in 1990. Its title track (also written by Loggins) and "Dancy's Dream" were top-five hits, while "When Somebody Loves You" and "Long Lost Friend" were less successful. Robert K. Oermann of The Tennessean found this album superior to the ones before it, praising the "direct approach" of the singles' lyrics, while also noting a roots rock influence in the increased use of acoustic instruments over the preceding albums. David J. Remondini, writing for The Indianapolis Star, thought the album's title track had an "attractive melody and gripping lyrics", also considering the album to have "the right balance of tempos" and influences of bluegrass music in tracks such as "Dancy's Dream". Tim Darragh of the Allentown, Pennsylvania, Morning Call was less favorable, criticizing the album for "prefab harmonies" and formulaic lyrics. Fast Movin' Train became the band's third gold album in 1991, and the title track accounted for the band's fourth Grammy nomination. During this timespan, Stewart sang backing vocals on "They Just Don't Make 'em Like You Anymore", a track from Kenny Rogers' 1991 album Back Home Again. A greatest hits package, The Best of Restless Heart, followed in 1991. It included two new recordings, both of which were released as singles: "You Can Depend on Me" was a top-five hit, while "Familiar Pain" was less successful. As DuBois had become president of Arista Nashville by this point, his production duties for the new songs were taken over by Josh Leo. The release of this compilation also led to "Til I Loved You" being re-issued for adult contemporary, peaking at number 33 on the Billboard chart for that format.

=== 1991: Departure of Larry Stewart ===
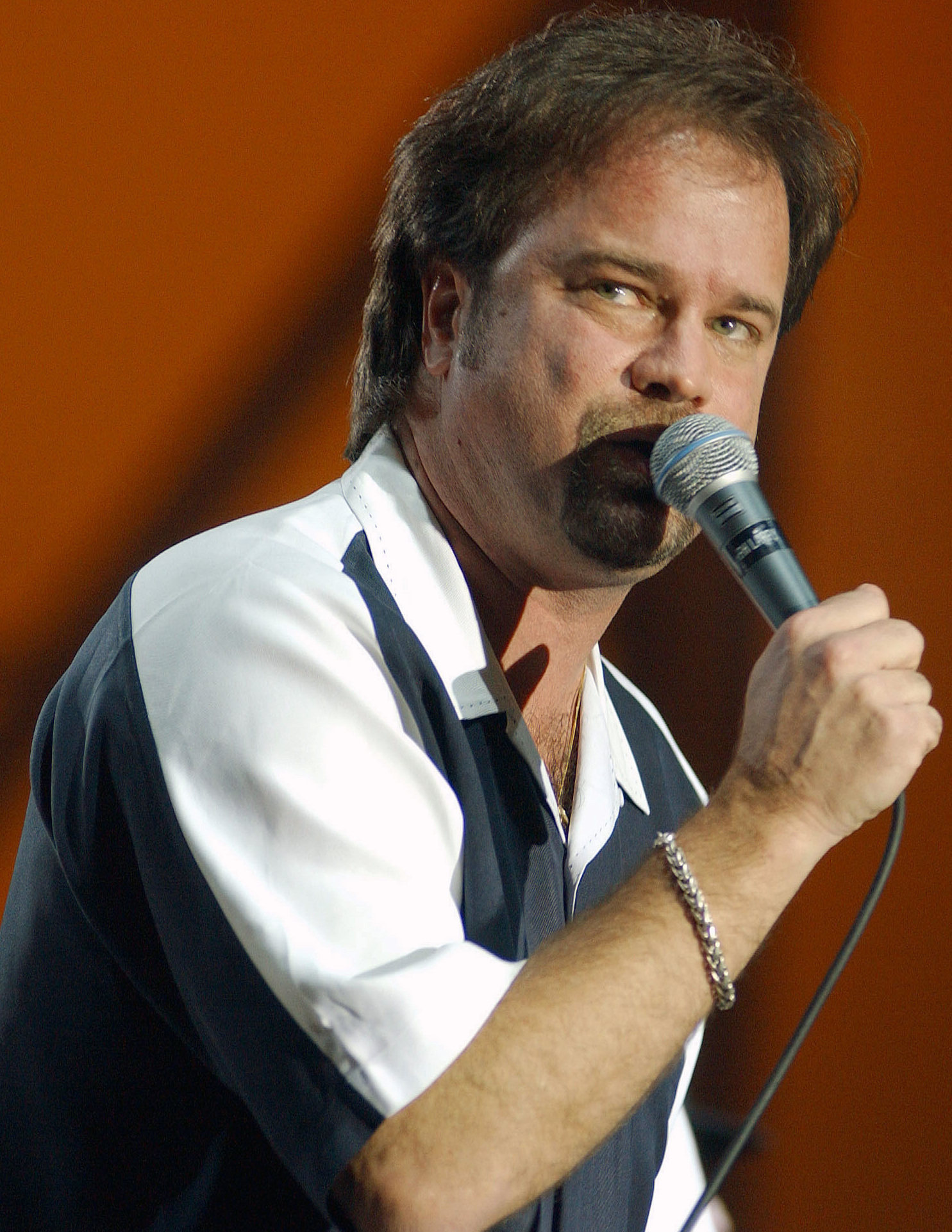
Larry Stewart was the lead singer of Restless Heart for the majority of the band's career.

Larry Stewart left the band in December 1991 because he wanted to perform as a solo artist with a more neotraditional country style, as opposed to the band's country pop influence. According to the other band members, his decision to leave was "a surprise at first", although the departure was amicable. Stewart initially remained with RCA as a solo artist. His debut single "Alright Already" reached number five on the country music charts in 1993, and "I'll Cry Tomorrow" was also a top-40 country hit. Both of these were included on his solo debut album Down the Road. He recorded two albums for Columbia Records in 1994 and 1996, and while these albums accounted for five more charted singles, none entered top 40 on the country charts.

The remaining four members decided to rotate lead vocal duties amongst themselves instead of hiring a new lead vocalist, as they thought Stewart was the "most conservative" member of the group and that alternating the lead vocal would allow the band to become "more adventurous". In addition, they thought this arrangement was tenable due to their admiration of other bands with more than one lead vocalist, such as the Eagles, Chicago, and the Beatles. They first performed without Stewart at a concert in Grand Forks, North Dakota, in early 1992, followed by a series of dates throughout Canada. To accommodate for Stewart's departure, the other band members assumed the vocal duties when singing their existing singles in concert. Innis sang "The Bluest Eyes in Texas" and "Fast Movin' Train", Dittrich sang "Dancy's Dream" and "Big Dreams in a Small Town", Jennings sang "A Tender Lie", and Gregg sang everything else. The only song omitted from their set lists was "Why Does It Have to Be (Wrong or Right)", due to it having a more complex vocal arrangement which they felt could not be achieved with only four voices.

=== 1992–1993: Big Iron Horses ===
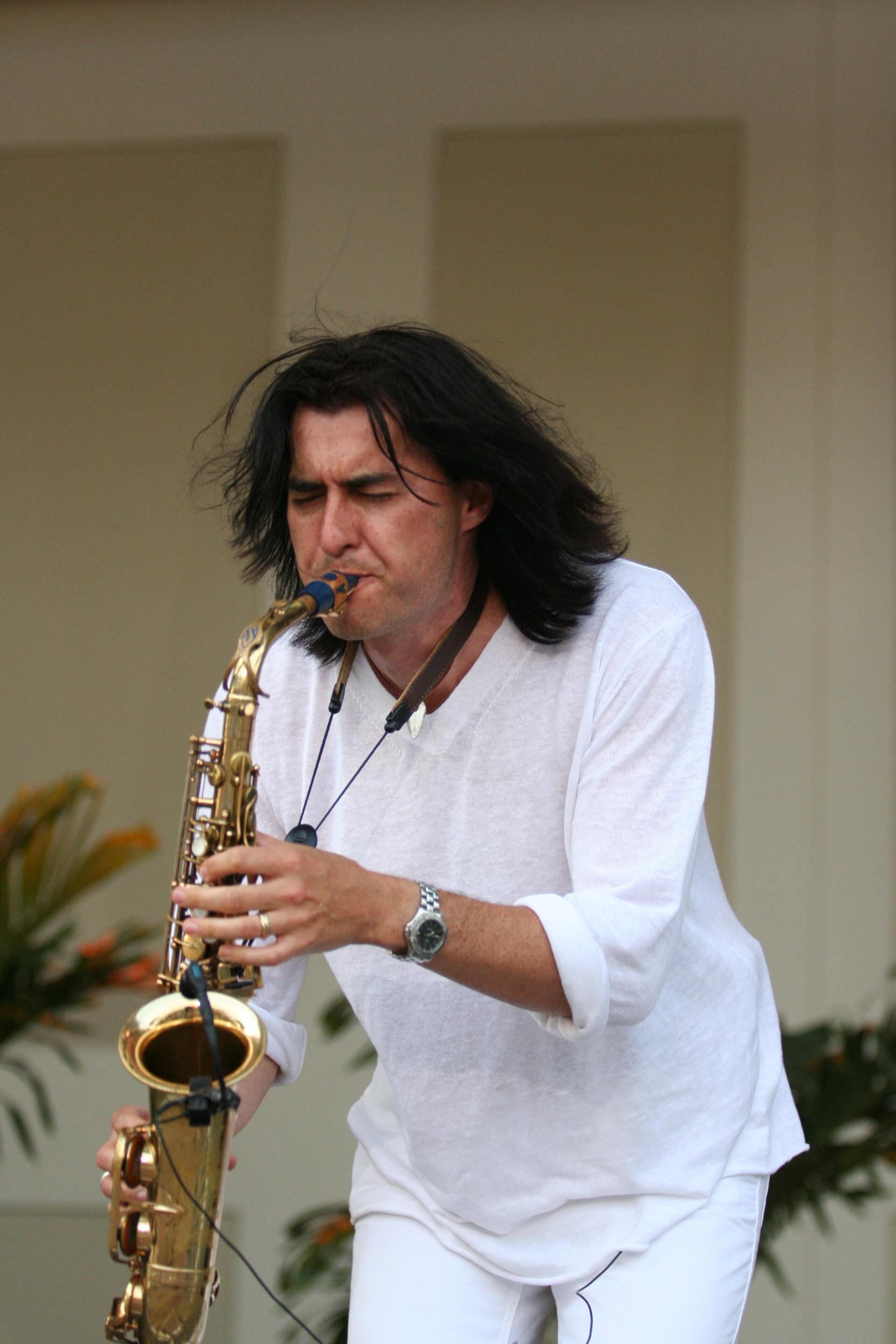
Restless Heart provided vocals to saxophonist Warren Hill's "Tell Me What You Dream" in 1993.

The rotation of lead vocal duties continued on Restless Heart's next album, 1992's Big Iron Horses. Leo once again served as producer and alternated with Bruce Gaitsch as rhythm guitarist on several songs, while Bernie Leadon contributed on banjo. According to the band, Leo encouraged them to write more songs by themselves than on previous efforts, as he thought both this and the absence of Stewart would allow the other members to have more fully realized musical personalities than before. In particular, Jennings thought that Dittrich, being a drummer who also sang, was favorably comparable to Eagles vocalist and drummer Don Henley. One of the tracks with Dittrich on lead vocals, "When She Cries", was the album's first single. It went to number nine on the country charts, number eleven on the Hot 100 (their highest entry on that chart), and number two on the adult contemporary charts. Additionally it accounted for the band's fifth and final Grammy nomination. After it came "We Got the Love" and "Mending Fences", which both fell short of the country top ten. Dittrich also sang the former, while Gregg sang the latter.

Innis also left the band in January 1993, with the other band members citing "erratic behavior" that resulted in the cancellation of five concerts a month prior as the reason behind his departure. Jennings also noted that Innis wanted to "assume a bigger role" after Stewart's departure and that there were unsubstantiated rumors among the other band members that Innis was subject to drug and alcohol abuse. In response to Innis's departure, they hired Dwain Rowe as touring keyboardist and Chris Hicks as touring guitarist. Three months later, the band reached the top of the Billboard adult contemporary charts as guest vocalists on Canadian smooth jazz saxophonist Warren Hill's single "Tell Me What You Dream".

=== 1994–1998: Disbanding and first reunion ===
The next album, 1994's Matters of the Heart, included only Gregg, Jennings and Dittrich, along with a number of studio musicians. Among these were keyboardists Bill Cuomo and Hawk Wolinski, as well as upright bass player Roy Huskey Jr. and fiddle player Stuart Duncan. The band intentionally sought to make the album more traditionally country than its predecessors due to increasing competition they had faced following the arrival of several new country bands in the early 1990s. Its only single, "Baby Needs New Shoes", fell short of the top 40. Alanna Nash of Entertainment Weekly rated the album "C", as she thought the tracks "Sweet Whiskey Lies" and "Hometown Boy" were more country-sounding than their previous songs, although she considered the arrangements "by the book". Restless Heart was one of several country music artists to make a cameo in the 1994 Mel Gibson film Maverick. They sang the title track to the movie's soundtrack, which also featured both them and Stewart on a multi-artist collaborative rendition of the hymn "Amazing Grace" credited to "The Maverick Choir".

Due to the commercial failure of Matters of the Heart, Restless Heart was dropped by RCA Nashville at the end of 1994. In response to this, the three remaining band members announced they would go on hiatus in January 1995. Stewart, Jennings, Dittrich, and Gregg reunited for one performance in June 1996 which included acoustic renditions of "Big Dreams in a Small Town", "The Bluest Eyes in Texas", "Fast Movin' Train", and "Amazing Grace". This was not considered a formal reunion, as the band members had done so to honor the wishes of a terminally ill member of their fan club. At the time, Stewart was continuing to record as a solo artist, Jennings had joined Vince Gill's road band, and Gregg was managing a chain of car washes owned by his family.

In late 1996, Dittrich founded another band called the Buffalo Club with guitarist Charlie Kelley and lead vocalist Ron Hemby, a former member of the Imperials. The Buffalo Club recorded one album for Rising Tide Records and charted three singles, including the top ten "If She Don't Love You" in early 1997. This song had previously been offered to Restless Heart by its co-writer Marc Beeson (who also co-wrote "When She Cries"), but they had declined to record it. Dittrich resigned from the Buffalo Club in August 1997, and the other two members separated by year's end. According to a former Rising Tide executive, Dittrich's departure and the Buffalo Club's disbanding were due to Dittrich expressing interest in a Restless Heart reunion tour, which created conflict among him, the other two band members, and label executives.

Stewart, Jennings, Dittrich, and Gregg reunited to record three new tracks for their second greatest-hits compilation in 1998, Greatest Hits. According to Stewart, this reunion and album were done at the request of RCA executives. In addition to their previous hit singles, the album included the new songs "No End to This Road", "For Lack of Better Words", and "Somebody's Gonna Get That Girl", the former two of which were issued as singles. The band promoted this project the same year by touring with Gill before disbanding a second time. Following this second disbanding, Stewart released a fourth solo album for Windham Hill Records in 1999.

=== 2001-2005: Second reunion and Still Restless ===
Other than Stewart, the individual members of Restless Heart remained largely inactive until August 2001, when Stewart, Gregg, Jennings, Dittrich, and Innis all officially reunited and began rehearsing together. Stewart told CMT journalist Edward Morris that the impetus for their reunion was a telephone call from Hendricks, who was having lunch with Innis at the time. At this point, Stewart and Innis had not talked to each other for a number of years, owing to the disputes that had led to Innis departing the band several years prior. Stewart then chose to call Innis, at which point the two resolved and suggested re-forming Restless Heart. Immediately after their reunion the band resumed touring, with one of their first reunion concerts taking place at the French Lick Resort in French Lick, Indiana, in January 2002. They also released a single titled "Torch of Freedom", which they performed in 2003 at the Larry H. Miller Utah Summer Games.

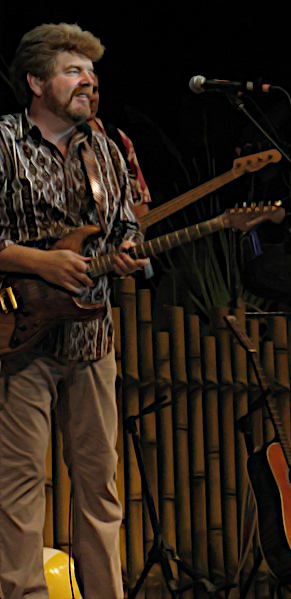
Mac McAnally co-produced and wrote three songs on the band's 2004 reunion album Still Restless.

After they had all reunited, the five members decided to record a new album. As both Hendricks and DuBois were involved in other projects at the time, the band selected a different set of producers. One of the producers was Kyle Lehning, best known for his work with Randy Travis. Lehning shared duties with Mac McAnally, a singer-songwriter and producer who is also a member of Jimmy Buffett's Coral Reefer Band. The recordings with Lehning and McAnally became the band's 2004 album Still Restless, released on the Nashville division of Koch Records (now MNRK Music Group). In addition to co-producing, McAnally sang background vocals and played guitar, piano, mandola, and the Papoose, a custom-made guitar created by Tacoma Guitars. He also wrote three of the album's songs including "Down the Road", which was previously a single for him in 1990, and would later be re-released in 2008 as a duet between him and Kenny Chesney. Dittrich sang another one of McAnally's compositions, "Looking Back", as well as a cover of the Beatles's "The Night Before", while Gregg sang "Yesterday's News". Lead single "Feel My Way to You" peaked at number 29 on the country music charts and was the album's only single before Koch Records closed its Nashville division in 2005.

=== 2006-2021: Final years and disbanding ===
The band released a live album, 25 and Live, in 2007 through their website. This was later reissued in early 2009 as part of a 25th anniversary package which also included Still Restless and a compilation of music videos. Restless Heart continued touring throughout the first decade of the 21st century, including a number of shows for members of the United States Air Force as well as the Blue Suede Dinner and Auction, a charity event held by the Carl Perkins Center for the Prevention of Child Abuse. By 2011, the band was doing over 100 concerts a year. Restless Heart was still primarily a touring band throughout the 2010s and had not released a new album in several years, although they thought their existing hit singles were "strong" enough to be accepted by younger generations of fans as well. In 2015, both they and Becky Hobbs were inducted into the Oklahoma Music Hall of Fame. One of their few releases in the 2010s was a cover of Glen Campbell's "Wichita Lineman". According to the band members, they had been encouraged by Campbell to record the song after meeting him thirty years ago, but had not previously found the time to do so.

In 2018, Stewart began recording with the Frontmen, a group which also includes Richie McDonald and Tim Rushlow, respectively former lead singers of Lonestar and Little Texas. Despite the foundation of this group, Stewart continued to tour with Restless Heart at the time. A year later, Restless Heart joined the Triple Threat Tour, which included Blackhawk and Shenandoah. One of this tour's first stops was at MontanaFair in Billings, Montana.

Restless Heart officially retired in 2021, although little announcement was made of this. Stewart said that factors in their retirement included disagreements over a proposed album to honor the band's 35th anniversary, as well as his own commitments to the Frontmen and the start of the COVID-19 pandemic. Following their retirement, Innis moved to Waco, Texas, and began various music projects there. Stewart continued to record with the Frontmen, who signed a recording contract with BBR Music Group in mid-2023.

== Musical stylings ==
DuBois said that he conceived Restless Heart as "a hot, instrumental band that could really play well on stage—that had great harmony" and that he had given them songs that he felt were "natural" but had been rejected by other artists such as Alabama for being "too pop". He noted that during showcases for radio representatives early in the band's career, he was often questioned on the band's ability to "duplicate their records live" due to their having been assembled in a studio setting; however, DuBois felt that live performances were not an issue due to the band having played and sung everything on their debut album without any additional session musicians or studio vocalists. Although many of the band members had experience writing songs, they allowed songs from DuBois or other writers as well; Jennings said in 1992 that "when it comes to choosing tunes, the best song wins."

Restless Heart's sound draws influences from mainstream country music, as well as from pop and rock. Because of the band's layered harmonies, many critics have drawn comparisons to the Eagles. Sterling Whitaker of Taste of Country describes Stewart as having a "clear, strong tenor". Stewart said that his affinity for vocal harmony was influenced by the music he listened to as a child, which included The Jordanaires and various gospel music groups, and that the band cited a variety of musicians from Buck Owens to Eric Clapton as individual influences. He thought that the band members having varied influences outside of country was a factor in their sound. A 1985 article in Billboard wrote that debut single "Let the Heartache Ride" "introduced the band's razor-edged vocal harmonies and scorching instrumentals." Writing for Knight Ridder, James M. Tarbox found the band's vocal harmonies comparable to both the Eagles and to Exile. Colin Larkin in the Virgin Encyclopedia of Country Music wrote that the band was "continuing with the soft rock sounds and harmonies" of the Eagles. He thought the track "Wheels" had a similar sound and concept to the Eagles's 1972 debut single "Take It Easy". Mario Tarradell of The Miami News noted the band's ability to record both "rockers" and ballads, contrasting the "heavy guitar and keyboard action" on tracks such as "Jenny Come Back" and "The Storm" and the "up-tempo beat" of "Big Dreams in a Small Town", while noting "tender" vocal delivery on tracks such as "A Tender Lie" and "The Bluest Eyes in Texas". Reviewing their debut album, John Wooley of the Tulsa World thought the band's harmonies and rock influences were comparable to both the Eagles and Poco. He furthered the comparison to the Eagles by noting that both bands performed songs with "bittersweet imagery about quicksilver women".

Because of their pop and rock influences, the band members initially had doubts as to their success at a time when neotraditional country acts such as Randy Travis were beginning to gain in popularity. Stewart later said their doubts about success were assuaged when "That Rock Won't Roll" became a number one single. Joe Edwards of the Associated Press noted that the band initially faced resistance due to the lack of traditional country instrumentation such as fiddle and steel guitar, or typical country lyrical content such as heartbreak or consumption of alcohol. In response to this, Stewart said he considered "lyrics that touch people's heart" more important by comparison. Gregg stated in June 1994 that, due to the crossover success of "When She Cries" and "Tell Me What You Dream" in the early 1990s, some radio station executives in the United States thought the band was attempting to abandon the country format and thus refused to play their later singles.

The band members have noted their influence on subsequent generations of country musicians such as Brad Paisley and Little Big Town, both of whom have covered Restless Heart songs in concert. A cappella country group Home Free has also cited Restless Heart as a major influence on their vocal harmonies, and the group covered "Why Does It Have to Be (Wrong or Right)" in 2019.

== Band members ==
A table indicating the members of Restless Heart

1984	Verlon Thompson – lead vocals; John Dittrich – drums, background vocals; Paul Gregg – bass guitar, background vocals; Dave Innis – piano, keyboards, background vocals; Greg Jennings - lead guitar, background vocals
1984–1991	Larry Stewart – lead vocals, rhythm guitar; John Dittrich – drums, background vocals; Paul Gregg – bass guitar, background vocals; Dave Innis – piano, keyboards, background vocals; Greg Jennings - lead guitar, background vocals
1991–1993	John Dittrich – drums, vocals; Paul Gregg – bass guitar, vocals; Dave Innis – piano, keyboards, vocals; Greg Jennings - guitars, vocals
1993–1994	John Dittrich – drums, vocals; Paul Gregg – bass guitar, vocals; Greg Jennings - lead guitar, vocals; Dwain Rowe - keyboards (touring); Chris Hicks - rhythm guitar (touring)
1995–1997	Disbanded
1998	John Dittrich – drums, background vocals; Paul Gregg – bass guitar, background vocals; Greg Jennings - lead guitar, background vocals; Larry Stewart -lead vocals, rhythm guitar
1999–2001	Disbanded
2001–2021	Larry Stewart – lead vocals, rhythm guitar; John Dittrich – drums, lead and background vocals; Paul Gregg – bass guitar, lead and background vocals; Dave Innis – piano, keyboards, background vocals; Greg Jennings - lead guitar, background vocals

== Discography ==
A list of albums released by Restless Heart

Albums

- Restless Heart (1985)
- Wheels (1986)
- Big Dreams in a Small Town (1988)
- Fast Movin' Train (1990)
- Big Iron Horses (1992)
- Matters of the Heart (1994)
- Still Restless (2004)

=== Billboard number-one hits ===
- "That Rock Won't Roll" (1 week, 1986)
- "I'll Still Be Loving You" (1 week, 1986-1987)
- "Why Does It Have to Be (Wrong or Right)" (1 week, 1987)
- "Wheels" (1 week, 1987-1988)
- "The Bluest Eyes in Texas" (1 week, 1988)
- "A Tender Lie" (1 week, 1988)

== Awards and nominations ==
=== Grammy Awards ===
Year	Nominee / work	Award	Result
1988	"I'll Still Be Loving You"	Best Country Performance by a Duo or Group with Vocal	Nominated
1989	Big Dreams in a Small Town	Best Country Performance by a Duo or Group with Vocal	Nominated
1990	"Big Dreams in a Small Town"	Best Country Performance by a Duo or Group with Vocal	Nominated
1991	"Fast Movin' Train"	Best Country Performance by a Duo or Group with Vocal	Nominated
1993	"When She Cries"	Best Country Performance by a Duo or Group with Vocal	Nominated

=== American Music Awards ===
Year	Nominee / work	Award	Result
1988	Restless Heart	Favorite Country Band/Duo/Group	Nominated

=== Academy of Country Music Awards ===
Year	Nominee / work	Award	Result
1987	Restless Heart	Top Vocal Group of the Year	Nominated
1988	Restless Heart	Top Vocal Group of the Year	Nominated
1988	"I'll Still Be Loving You"	Single Record of the Year	Nominated
1989	"The Bluest Eyes in Texas"	Single Record of the Year	Shortlisted
1989	"The Bluest Eyes in Texas"	Song of the Year	Shortlisted
1989	Restless Heart	Top Vocal Group of the Year	Nominated
1990	Restless Heart	Top Vocal Group of the Year	Won
1991	Restless Heart	Top Vocal Group of the Year	Nominated
1993	Restless Heart	Top Vocal Group of the Year	Nominated

=== Country Music Association Awards ===
Year	Nominee / work	Award	Result
1987	Restless Heart	Horizon Award	Nominated
1987	Restless Heart	Vocal Group of the Year	Nominated
1988	Restless Heart	Vocal Group of the Year	Nominated
1989	Restless Heart	Vocal Group of the Year	Nominated
1990	Restless Heart	Vocal Group of the Year	Nominated
1991	Restless Heart	Vocal Group of the Year	Nominated
1993	Restless Heart	Vocal Group of the Year	Nominated
