= Restless Heart (Restless Heart album) =

Studio album by Restless Heart
- Released: March 25, 1985
- Recorded: 1984
- Studios: Sound Stage Studios, Center Stage Studios and MasterMix (Nashville, Tennessee); The Bennett House (Franklin, Tennessee)
- Genre: Country
- Length: 27:19
- Label: RCA Nashville
- Producers: Tim DuBois Scott Hendricks Restless Heart

Restless Heart chronology
Restless Heart (1985)	Wheels (1986)

Singles from Restless Heart
- 1. "Let the Heartache Ride" Released: January 26, 1985; 2. "I Want Everyone to Cry" Released: May 20, 1985; 3. "(Back to the) Heartbreak Kid" Released: October 26, 1985; 4. "Til I Loved You" Released: March 15, 1986

Professional ratings
Review scores
Source	Rating
Allmusic	2.5/5 stars

Restless Heart is the debut studio album by American country music group Restless Heart. It was released by RCA Nashville in March 1985. "Let the Heartache Ride," "I Want Everyone to Cry," "(Back to the) Heartbreak Kid" and "Til I Loved You" were released as singles. The album reached #10 on the Top Country Albums chart.

== Track listing ==
No.	Title	Writer(s)	Length
1.	"Let the Heartache Ride"	Van Stephenson, Dave Robbins, Tim DuBois	3:37
2.	"I Want Everyone to Cry"	Wood Newton, Michael Noble	3:27
3.	"(Back to The) Heartbreak Kid"	Stephenson, DuBois	3:53
4.	"Restless Heart"	DuBois, Stephenson, Robbins	3:36
5.	"She's Coming Home"	Randy Sharp, Donny Lowery	3:04
6.	"Til I Loved You"	Stephenson, Robbins, Jeff Silbar	3:03
7.	"Shakin' the Night Away"	Gary Burr	2:48
8.	"She Danced Her Way (Into My Heart)"	Stephenson, Silbar, Sam Lorber	3:51

== Production ==
- Restless Heart – producers
- Tim DuBois – producer
- Scott Hendricks – producer, engineer, mixing
- J. T. Cantwell – assistant engineer
- Phil Dihel – assistant engineer
- Clark Schleicher – assistant engineer
- Bob Ludwig – mastering at Masterdisk (New York City, New York)
- Jim Osborn – art direction
- Mark Tucker – photography

== Personnel ==
Restless Heart

- Larry Stewart – lead vocals, keyboards
- David Innis – keyboards, vocals
- Greg Jennings – guitars, vocals
- Paul Gregg – bass guitar, vocals
- John Dittrich – drums, vocals

Additional musicians

- Verlon Thompson
- Michael Rhodes
- Dennis Holt

== Charts ==
=== Weekly charts ===
Chart (1985)	Peak position
US Top Country Albums (Billboard)	10

=== Year-end charts ===
Chart (1985)	Position
US Top Country Albums (Billboard)	39
