= You Can Depend on Me (Restless Heart song) =

Single by Restless Heart

from the album The Best of Restless Heart
- B-side: "Til I Loved You"
- Released: October 7, 1991
- Genre: Country
- Length: 2:38
- Label: RCA Nashville
- Songwriters: Ronnie Rogers; Jimmy Griffin
- Producers: Josh Leo; Larry Michael Lee

Restless Heart singles chronology
"Long Lost Friend" (1991)	"You Can Depend on Me" (1991)	"Familiar Pain" (1992)

"You Can Depend on Me" is a song written by Ronnie Rogers and Jimmy Griffin, and recorded by American country music group Restless Heart. It was released in October 1991 as the first single from their compilation album The Best of Restless Heart. The song reached number 3 on the Billboard Hot Country Singles & Tracks chart.

== Critical reception ==
Deborah Evans Price, of Billboard magazine reviewed the song favorably, saying that "instant harmonies are vibrant as well as graceful in delivery." She goes on to say that the production has a "different edge" and that the arrangement is "excellent."

== Chart performance ==
"You Can Depend on Me" debuted on the U.S. Billboard Hot Country Singles & Tracks for the week of October 19, 1991.

Chart (1991–1992)	Peak position
Canada Country Singles (RPM)	21
US Hot Country Songs (Billboard)	3

=== Year-end charts ===
Chart (1992)	Position
US Country Songs (Billboard)	68
