= Matters of the Heart (Restless Heart album) =

Studio album by Restless Heart
- Released: May 24, 1994
- Studios: Sixteenth Avenue Sound (Nashville, Tennessee); The Castle (Franklin, Tennessee)
- Genre: Country
- Length: 33:20
- Label: RCA Nashville
- Producers: Josh Leo Greg Jennings Restless Heart

Restless Heart chronology
Big Iron Horses (1992)	Matters of the Heart (1994)	Greatest Hits (1998)

Matters of the Heart is the sixth studio album by American country music group Restless Heart. It was released by RCA Nashville in 1994. "Baby Needs New Shoes" was the only single released from the album. This is also the band's first album not to feature keyboardist Dave Innis, who left in 1993.

Entertainment Weekly gave the album a "C", with critic Alanna Nash saying that it had "more interesting country material" but that the band's sound was still "by the book".

== Track listing ==
1. "In This Little Town" (John Dittrich, Rick Bowles, Josh Leo) - 3:16
2. "Love Train" (Paul Gregg, Rob Crosby, Scott Hendricks) - 2:58
3. "Mind Over Matters of the Heart" (Gary Cotton, Crosby) - 3:10
4. "Baby Needs New Shoes" (Ronnie Guilbeau, Billy Crain, Thom McHugh) - 3:11
5. "Hold You Now" (Greg Jennings, Stan Lynch, Rafe Van Hoy) - 3:25
6. "She's Still in Love" (Tommy Polk, Johnny Neel) - 3:33
7. "You're a Stronger Man Than I Am" (Dittrich, Bowles, Marc Beeson) - 3:23
8. "Hometown Boy" (Kerry Chater, Lynn Gillespie Chater, Tom Paden) - 3:30
9. "Sweet Whiskey Lies" (Dittrich, Bowles, Beeson) - 3:30
10. "I'd Cross the Line" (Dittrich, Gregg, Jennings, Bowles) - 3:24

== Personnel ==
Adapted from Matters of the Heart liner notes.

Restless Heart

- John Dittrich – vocals, drums (2–10)
- Paul Gregg – vocals, bass (1, 3–8, 10)
- Greg Jennings – vocals, guitars, mandolin

Additional musicians

- Bill Cuomo – keyboards
- Hawk Wolinski – acoustic piano, Hammond B3 organ
- Dan Dugmore – steel guitar
- Mike Brignardello – bass (2)
- Roy Huskey Jr. – upright bass (2)
- Duncan Mullins – bass (9)
- Chad Cromwell – drums (1)
- Stuart Duncan – fiddle

Production

- Restless Heart – producers
- Greg Jennings – producer
- Josh Leo – producer
- Steve Marcantonio – recording, mixing
- Pete Martinez – second engineer
- John Hurley – additional mix engineer
- Don Cobb – digital editing
- Denny Purcell – mastering
- Georgetown Masters (Nashville, Tennessee) – editing and mastering location
- Joe Johnston – production coordinator
- Mary Hamilton – art direction
- Julie Wanca – art design
- Tamara Reynolds – photography
- Ann Rice – stylist
- Deborah Wingo – make-up
- The Fitzgerald/Hartley Co. – management
