= Let the Heartache Ride =

Single by Restless Heart

from the album Restless Heart
- B-side: "Few and Far Between"
- Released: January 26, 1985
- Genre: Country
- Length: 3:39
- Label: RCA Nashville
- Songwriters: Van Stephenson, Dave Robbins, Tim DuBois
- Producers: Tim DuBois, Scott Hendricks

Restless Heart singles chronology
"Let the Heartache Ride" (1985)	"I Want Everyone to Cry" (1985)

"Let the Heartache Ride" is the debut single by American country music group Restless Heart, released in January 1985 from their self-titled debut album. The song was written by Van Stephenson, Dave Robbins and Tim DuBois. It reached number 23 on the Billboard Hot Country Singles & Tracks chart.

== Chart performance ==
Chart (1985)	Peak position
US Hot Country Songs (Billboard)	23
Canadian RPM Country Tracks	20
