= Mending Fences (song) =

Single by Restless Heart

from the album Big Iron Horses
- B-side: "We're Gonna Be OK"
- Released: January 18, 1993
- Genre: Country
- Length: 2:51
- Label: RCA Nashville
- Songwriters: Jim Robinson, Andy Byrd
- Producers: Josh Leo; Restless Heart

Restless Heart singles chronology
"When She Cries" (1992)	"Mending Fences" (1993)	"Tell Me What You Dream" (1993)

"Mending Fences" is a song written by Jim Robinson and Andy Byrd, and recorded by American country music group Restless Heart. It was released in January 1993 as the second single from the album Big Iron Horses. The song reached number 13 on the Billboard Hot Country Singles & Tracks chart and peaked at number 3 on the Canadian RPM Country Tracks chart. Bassist Paul Gregg sings lead vocals on this song.

== Music video ==
The music video was directed by Michael Merriman and premiered in early 1993.

== Chart performance ==
"Mending Fences" debuted at number 66 on the U.S. Billboard Hot Country Singles & Tracks for the week of January 23, 1993.

Chart (1993)	Peak position
Canada Country Singles (RPM)	3
US Hot Country Songs (Billboard)	13

=== Year-end charts ===
Chart (1993)	Position
Canada Country Tracks (RPM)	43
