= A Tender Lie =

Single by Restless Heart

from the album Big Dreams in a Small Town
- B-side: "This Time"
- Released: September 1988
- Genre: Country
- Length: 3:29
- Label: RCA Nashville
- Songwriter: Randy Sharp
- Producers: Tim DuBois; Scott Hendricks; Restless Heart

Restless Heart singles chronology
"The Bluest Eyes in Texas" (1988)	"A Tender Lie" (1988)	"Big Dreams in a Small Town" (1989)

"A Tender Lie" is a song written by Randy Sharp, and recorded by American country music band Restless Heart. It was released in September 1988 as the second single from the album Big Dreams in a Small Town. The song was the group's sixth consecutive number one, their sixth overall, and ultimately their final number one on the country chart. The single went to number one for one week.

== Music video ==
The music video was directed by George Bloom III and premiered in late 1988.

== Chart performance ==
Chart (1988)	Peak position
US Hot Country Songs (Billboard)	1
Canadian RPM Country Tracks	2

=== Year-end charts ===
Chart (1988)	Position
Canadian RPM Country Tracks	99

== Covers ==
R&B group The Three Degrees recorded a cover of the song for their 1989 album Three Degrees...And Holding and Dolly Parton recorded a bluegrass cover on her 2001 album Little Sparrow.
