= Til I Loved You =

Single by Restless Heart

from the album Restless Heart
- B-side: "Shakin' the Night Away"
- Released: March 15, 1986
- Genre: Country
- Length: 2:59
- Songwriter(s): Van Stephenson, Dave Robbins, Jeff Silbar
- Producer(s): Tim DuBois, Scott Hendricks

Restless Heart singles chronology
"(Back to the) Heartbreak Kid" (1985)	"Til I Loved You" (1986)	"That Rock Won't Roll" (1986)

"Til I Loved You" is a song written by Van Stephenson, Dave Robbins and Jeff Silbar, and first recorded by American singer Juice Newton for her 1983 album Dirty Looks. It was covered by Restless Heart in 1985 and released as the fourth single from their album Restless Heart in March 1986, peaking at number 10 on the Billboard Hot Country Singles & Tracks chart.

== Charts ==
Chart (1986)	Peak position
US Hot Country Songs (Billboard)	10
Canadian RPM Country Tracks	11
Chart (1992)	Peak position
US Billboard Adult Contemporary	33
