= That Rock Won't Roll =

Single by Restless Heart

from the album Wheels
- B-side: "You Can't Outrun the Night"
- Released: August 9, 1986
- Genre: Country rock, soft rock
- Length: 3:31
- Label: RCA Nashville
- Songwriter(s): Bob DiPiero; John Scott Sherrill
- Producer(s): Tim DuBois; Scott Hendricks; Restless Heart

Restless Heart singles chronology
"Til I Loved You" (1986)	"That Rock Won't Roll" (1986)	"I'll Still Be Loving You" (1987)

"That Rock Won't Roll" is a song written by Bob DiPiero and John Scott Sherrill and recorded by American country music group Restless Heart. It was released in August 1986 as the lead single from the album, Wheels. The song was Restless Heart's fifth country hit and the first of six consecutive number one country singles. The single went to number 1 for a week and spent a total of 23 weeks on the charts.

== Charts ==
Chart (1986)	Peak position
US Hot Country Songs (Billboard)	1
Canadian RPM Country Tracks	2
