= Feel My Way to You =

Single by Restless Heart

from the album Still Restless
- Released: July 24, 2004
- Genre: Country
- Length: 3:30
- Label: Koch
- Songwriter(s): Danny Orton, Jennifer Schot
- Producer(s): Kyle Lehning, Mac McAnally

Restless Heart singles chronology
"For Lack of Better Words" (1998)	"Feel My Way to You" (2004)	"Home" (2013)

"Feel My Way to You" is a song recorded by American country music group Restless Heart. It was released in July 2004 as the first single from the album Still Restless. The song reached #29 on the Billboard Hot Country Singles & Tracks chart. The song was written by Danny Orton and Jennifer Schot.

== Critical reception ==
Deborah Evans Price of Billboard thought that the song sounded "fresh and breezy" in the context of Restless Heart's reunion. She also praised the lyrics, Larry Stewart's lead vocal, and the use of mandolin in the production.

== Chart performance ==
Chart (2004)	Peak position
US Hot Country Songs (Billboard)	29
