= Big Dreams in a Small Town (song) =

Single by Restless Heart

from the album Big Dreams in a Small Town
- B-side: "The Ride of Your Life"
- Released: February 1989
- Genre: Country
- Length: 3:33
- Label: RCA Nashville
- Songwriters: Van Stephenson; Dave Robbins; Tim DuBois
- Producers: Tim DuBois; Scott Hendricks; Restless Heart

Restless Heart singles chronology
"A Tender Lie" (1988)	"Big Dreams in a Small Town" (1989)	"Say What's in Your Heart" (1989)

"Big Dreams in a Small Town" is a song recorded by American country music group Restless Heart. It was released in February 1989 as the third single and title track from the album Big Dreams in a Small Town. The song reached number 3 on the Billboard Hot Country Singles & Tracks chart. It was written by Van Stephenson, Dave Robbins and Tim DuBois.

== Content ==
The song is an up-tempo in which the narrator talks about wanting to leave the small-town life with his significant other when he is young. Eventually he decides to stay in the small town for the rest of his life.

== Music video ==
The music video was directed by Bill Balsley and premiered in early 1989.

== Chart performance ==
Chart (1989)	Peak position
Canada Country Singles (RPM)	5
US Hot Country Songs (Billboard)	3

=== Year-end charts ===
Chart (1989)	Position
US Country Songs (Billboard)	63
