= Fast Movin' Train (song) =

Single by Restless Heart

from the album Fast Movin' Train
- B-side: "The Truth Hurts"
- Released: December 1989
- Genre: Country
- Length: 4:24
- Label: RCA Nashville
- Songwriter: Dave Loggins
- Producers: Scott Hendricks, Tim DuBois, Restless Heart

Restless Heart singles chronology
"Say What's in Your Heart" (1989)	"Fast Movin' Train" (1989)	"Dancy's Dream" (1990)

"Fast Movin' Train" is a song written by Dave Loggins and recorded by American country music group Restless Heart. It was released in December 1989 as the first single and title track from the album Fast Movin' Train. The song reached number 4 on the Billboard Hot Country Singles & Tracks chart.

== Content ==
The song is about a guy who falls for a woman on a one-night stand. She wants nothing to do with him beyond their one night together.

== Music video ==
The music video was directed by Jay Brown and premiered in late 1989. Billiards legend Rudolf Wanderone, who adopted the name "Minnesota Fats" after Jackie Gleason's character in the 1961 film The Hustler, has a cameo appearance in the video.

== Chart performance ==
Chart (1989–1990)	Peak position
Canada Country Singles (RPM)	3
US Hot Country Songs (Billboard)	4

=== Year-end charts ===
Chart (1990)	Position
Canada Country Tracks (RPM)	42
US Country Songs (Billboard)	37
