= Fast Movin' Train =

Studio album by Restless Heart
- Released: January 4, 1990
- Recorded: 1989
- Studios: Digital Recorders, OmniSound Studios and Nightingale Studio (Nashville, Tennessee); The Castle (Franklin, Tennessee)
- Genre: Country
- Length: 35:33
- Label: RCA Nashville
- Producers: Tim DuBois; Scott Hendricks; Restless Heart

Restless Heart chronology
Big Dreams in a Small Town (1988)	Fast Movin' Train (1990)	The Best of Restless Heart (1991)

Singles from Fast Movin' Train
- 1. "Fast Movin' Train" Released: December 1989; 2. "Dancy's Dream" Released: April 1990; 3. "When Somebody Loves You" Released: September 1, 1990; 4. "Long Lost Friend" Released: January 7, 1991

Fast Movin' Train is the fourth studio album by American country music group Restless Heart. It was released by RCA Nashville in 1990. The title track, "Dancy's Dream," "When Somebody Loves You" and "Long Lost Friend" were released as singles. The album reached #6 on the Top Country Albums chart and has been certified Gold by the RIAA.

== Track listing ==
No.	Title	Writer(s)	Length
1.	"Fast Movin' Train"	Dave Loggins	4:23
2.	"Dancy's Dream"	Tim DuBois, Greg Jennings, Monty Powell	4:16
3.	"Sweet Auburn"	Larry Stewart, Steve Bogard, Dave Robbins	3:22
4.	"I've Never Been So Sure"	Van Stephenson, DuBois, Dave Innis	3:14
5.	"Long Lost Friend"	Stewart, Bogard, Robbins	3:52
6.	"A Little More Coal on the Fire"	Loggins	3:02
7.	"When Somebody Loves You"	Johnny Neel, Rick Giles	3:37
8.	"Lady Luck"	Paul Gregg, Michael Noble, John Dittrich	2:58
9.	"River of Stone"	Wendy Waldman, Reed Nielsen	4:02
10.	"The Truth Hurts"	Stephenson, DuBois, Innis	2:47

- "The Truth Hurts" is only available on the CD version.

== Personnel ==
Restless Heart

- Larry Stewart – lead vocals, guitars
- David Innis – keyboards, vocals
- Greg Jennings – guitars, mandolin, vocals
- Paul Gregg – bass, vocals
- John Dittrich – drums, percussion, vocals

Additional Musicians

- Terry McMillan – harmonica, percussion

== Production ==
- Joe Galante – A&R direction
- Restess Heart – producers
- Tim DuBois – producer
- Scott Hendricks – producer, engineer, mixing, additional recording, digital editing, mastering
- Mike Clute – engineer, additional recording
- Chris Hammond – additional recording
- Steve Bishir – assistant engineer
- Jim DeMain – assistant engineer
- John Hurley – assistant engineer
- John Kunz – assistant engineer
- Mark Nevers – assistant engineer
- Gary Paczosa – assistant engineer
- Carry Summers – assistant engineer
- Carlos Grier – digital editing
- Denny Purcell – mastering
- Georgetown Masters (Nashville, Tennessee) – mastering location
- Mary Hamilton – art direction, design
- Kym Juister – design
- Jim "Señor" McGuire – photography
- Fitzgerald/Hartley Co. – management

== Charts ==
=== Weekly charts ===
Chart (1990)	Peak position
US Billboard 200	78
US Top Country Albums (Billboard)	6

=== Year-end charts ===
Chart (1990)	Position
US Top Country Albums (Billboard)	19
Chart (1991)	Position
US Top Country Albums (Billboard)	72

== Certifications ==
Region	Certification	Certified units/sales
United States (RIAA)	Gold	500,000^{^}
^{^} Shipments figures based on certification alone.
