= I'll Still Be Loving You =

Single by Restless Heart

from the album Wheels
- B-side: "Victim of the Game"
- Released: January 1987
- Genre: Country pop
- Length: 4:18 (album version); 3:21 (single version)
- Label: RCA Nashville
- Songwriter(s): Todd Cerney; Mary Ann Kennedy; Pam Rose; Pat Bunch
- Producer(s): Tim DuBois; Scott Hendricks; Restless Heart

Restless Heart singles chronology
| "That Rock Won't Roll" (1986) | "I'll Still Be Loving You" (1987) | "Why Does It Have to Be (Wrong or Right)" (1987) |

"I'll Still Be Loving You" is a song recorded by American country music group Restless Heart. It was released in January 1987 as the second single from the album Wheels. The song was written by Todd Cerney, Pam Rose, Mary Ann Kennedy and Pat Bunch, and was Restless Heart's second number-one country single. It went to number 1 on Hot Country Songs for one week and spent 25 weeks on the chart.

The single also was a hit on the Adult Contemporary chart and gave the band their first exposure on the pop charts, where it became their first top 40 single.

== Charts ==
=== Weekly charts ===
| Chart (1987) | Peak position |
|---|---|
| US Billboard Hot 100 | 33 |
| US Adult Contemporary (Billboard) | 3 |
| US Hot Country Songs (Billboard) | 1 |
| Canadian RPM Country Tracks | 1 |

=== Year-end charts ===
| Chart (1987) | Position |
|---|---|
| US Adult Contemporary (Billboard) | 25 |
| US Hot Country Songs (Billboard) | 36 |
