= Dancy's Dream =

Single by Restless Heart

from the album Fast Movin' Train
- B-side: "Lady Luck"
- Released: April 1990
- Genre: Country
- Length: 4:16
- Label: RCA Nashville
- Songwriters: Greg Jennings, Monty Powell, Tim DuBois
- Producers: Scott Hendricks, Tim DuBois, Restless Heart

Restless Heart singles chronology
"Fast Movin' Train" (1989)	"Dancy's Dream" (1990)	"When Somebody Loves You" (1990)

"Dancy's Dream" is a song recorded by American country music group Restless Heart. It was released in April 1990 as the second single from the album Fast Movin' Train. The song reached number 5 on the Billboard Hot Country Singles & Tracks chart. It was written by Greg Jennings, Monty Powell and Tim DuBois.

== Content ==
It is a mid-tempo song about a deacon who is haunted by an affair he held in his past in New Orleans, Louisiana, before marrying.

== Music video ==
The music video was directed by John Lloyd Miller and premiered in mid-1990.

== Chart performance ==
Chart (1990)	Peak position
Canada Country Singles (RPM)	4
US Hot Country Songs (Billboard)	5

=== Year-end charts ===
Chart (1990)	Position
Canada Country Tracks (RPM)	71
US Country Songs (Billboard)	67
