= (Back to the) Heartbreak Kid =

"(Back to The) Heartbreak Kid"

Single by Restless Heart

from the album Restless Heart
- B-side: "She Danced Her Way (Into My Heart)"
- Released: October 26, 1985
- Genre: Country
- Length: 3:51
- Label: RCA Nashville
- Songwriters: Van Stephenson, Tim DuBois
- Producers: Tim DuBois, Scott Hendricks

Restless Heart singles chronology
| "I Want Everyone to Cry" (1985) | "(Back to The) Heartbreak Kid" (1985) | "Til I Loved You" (1986) |

"(Back to The) Heartbreak Kid" is a song written by Van Stephenson and Tim DuBois, and recorded by American country music group Restless Heart. It was released in October 1985 as the third single from the album Restless Heart. The song reached number 7 on the Billboard Hot Country Singles & Tracks chart.

== Music video ==
A video for the song, depicting the band performing, was shot at Vasquez Rocks.

== Other versions ==
The song previously appeared on Kathy Mattea's 1984 self-titled album, and was the B-side to her 1984 single "You've Got a Soft Place to Fall".

== Chart performance ==
| Chart (1985–1986) | Peak position |
|---|---|
| US Hot Country Songs (Billboard) | 7 |
| Canadian RPM Country Tracks | 2 |
