= Big Iron Horses =

Studio album by Restless Heart
- Released: October 9, 1992
- Studios: Woodland Sound Studios, Recording Arts, Quad Studios and Masterfonics (Nashville, Tennessee); Frantic Studios (Los Angeles, California)
- Genre: Country
- Length: 38:33
- Label: RCA Nashville
- Producers: Restless Heart Josh Leo

Restless Heart chronology
The Best of Restless Heart (1991)	Big Iron Horses (1992)	Matters of the Heart (1994)

Singles from Big Iron Horses
- 1. "When She Cries" Released: August 31, 1992; 2. "Mending Fences" Released: January 18, 1993; 3. "Tell Me What You Dream" Released: February 22, 1993; 4. "We Got the Love" Released: May 22, 1993

Professional ratings
Review scores
Source	Rating
Allmusic	3/5 stars

Big Iron Horses is the fifth studio album by American country music group Restless Heart. It was released by RCA Nashville in 1992. "When She Cries," "Mending Fences," "We Got the Love" and the title track were released as singles. The album reached #26 on the Top Country Albums chart and has been certified Gold by the RIAA. This is also the band's first album not to feature lead vocalist Larry Stewart, who departed in 1991. Conversely, drummer John Dittrich, keyboardist Dave Innis, and bassist Paul Gregg alternate as lead vocalists on this album.

== Track listing ==
No.	Title	Writer(s)	Length
1.	"Mending Fences"	Jim Robinson, Andy Byrd	2:51
2.	"We Got the Love"	Steve Bogard, Rick Giles	2:49
3.	"As Far as I Can Tell"	Bruce Gaitsch, Dave Innis	3:49
4.	"When She Cries"	Marc Beeson, Sonny LeMaire	3:42
5.	"Meet Me on the Other Side"	Paul Gregg, Innis	4:09
6.	"We're Gonna Be OK"	Gaitsch, Innis	4:04
7.	"Blame It on Love"	Tommy Burroughs, Bernie Leadon, Jimmy Davis	3:30
8.	"Born in a High Wind"	Walt Aldridge, Gary Baker, Susan Longacre	4:09
9.	"Just in Time"	Gaitsch, Innis	4:03
10.	"Big Iron Horses"	John Dittrich, Innis, Vince Melamed	4:29

- On some releases of the album, the song "Tell Me What You Dream" replaces "We're Gonna Be OK" as track 6.

== Personnel ==
Restless Heart

- Greg Jennings – acoustic guitars, electric guitars, backing vocals
- Dave Innis – keyboards, backing vocals, lead vocals (3, 6, 9), string arrangements (10)
- Paul Gregg – bass, backing vocals, lead vocals (1, 5, 8)
- John Dittrich – drums, percussion, backing vocals, lead vocals (2, 4, 7, 10 & "Tell Me What You Dream")

Additional musicians

- Josh Leo – electric rhythm guitar (2, 7, 8)
- Bernie Leadon – banjo (2, 6)
- Bruce Gaitsch – additional guitars (3, 6, 9)
- Jim Horn – saxophone (8)
- Carl Marsh – string arrangements (10)

Additional musicians on "Tell Me What You Dream"

- Carl Marsh – keyboards
- Warren Hill – saxophone

== Production ==
- Restless Heart – producers
- Josh Leo – producer
- Steve Marcantonio – mixing, recording (1, 2, 4, 5, 7, 8, 10)
- Bruce Gaitsch – recording (3, 6, 9)
- Jeff Giedt – additional engineer (1, 2, 4, 5, 7, 8, 10)
- Mark Frigo – assistant engineer (1, 2, 4, 5, 7, 8, 10)
- Denny Purcell – mastering at Georgetown Masters (Nashville, Tennessee)
- Barbara Behler – production assistant
- Mary Hamilton – art direction
- Juliana Hammond – design
- Kym Juister – design
- Jim "Señor" McGuire – photography
- Ron Keith – train photos, photo illustration
- Mary Beth Felts – hair, make-up
- Ann Rice – wardrobe stylist
- Bill Simmons – management
- Fitzgerald Hartley Co. – management

== Chart performance ==
Chart (1992)	Peak position
U.S. Billboard Top Country Albums	26
U.S. Billboard 200	116
Canadian RPM Country Albums	1
