= Why Does It Have to Be (Wrong or Right) =

Single by Restless Heart

from the album Wheels
- B-side: "Hummingbird"
- Released: April 1987
- Genre: Country, soft rock
- Length: 3:00
- Label: RCA Nashville
- Songwriter(s): Randy Sharp; Donny Lowery
- Producer(s): Tim DuBois; Scott Hendricks; Restless Heart

Restless Heart singles chronology
"I'll Still Be Loving You" (1987)	"Why Does It Have to Be (Wrong or Right)" (1987)	"Wheels" (1987)

"Why Does It Have to Be (Wrong or Right)" is a song written by Randy Sharp and Donny Lowery and recorded by American country music group Restless Heart. It was released in April 1987 as the third single from the album, Wheels. The song was Restless Heart's third number one song on the country chart. The single went to number one for one week and spent a total of 25 weeks on the charts.

The B-side, "Hummingbird", was later released by Ricky Skaggs in 1990 from his album Kentucky Thunder.

== Music video ==
The music video was directed by George Bloom III and premiered in mid-1987.

== Charts ==
=== Weekly charts ===
Chart (1987)	Peak position
US Adult Contemporary (Billboard)	11
US Hot Country Songs (Billboard)	1
Canadian RPM Country Tracks	1

=== Year-end charts ===
Chart (1987)	Position
US Hot Country Songs (Billboard)	29
