= We Got the Love =

Single by Restless Heart

from the album Big Iron Horses
- B-side: "Meet Me on the Other Side"
- Released: May 22, 1993
- Genre: Country
- Length: 2:49
- Label: RCA Nashville
- Songwriters: Steve Bogard; Rick Giles
- Producers: Josh Leo, Restless Heart

Restless Heart singles chronology
"Tell Me What You Dream" (1993)	"We Got the Love" (1993)	"Big Iron Horses" (1993)

"We Got the Love" is a song written by Steve Bogard and Rick Giles and recorded by the American country music group Restless Heart. It was released in May 1993 as the fourth single from their album Big Iron Horses. The song reached number 11 on the Billboard Hot Country Singles & Tracks chart in August 1993. Former Eagles and Nitty Gritty Dirt Band member Bernie Leadon plays banjo on this track.

== Chart performance ==
Chart (1993)	Peak position
Canada Country Singles (RPM)	25
US Hot Country Songs (Billboard)	11
