= When She Cries =

1992 single by Restless Heart

Single by Restless Heart

from the album Big Iron Horses
- Released: August 31, 1992
- Length: 3:42
- Label: RCA
- Songwriters: Sonny LeMaire; Marc Beeson
- Producers: Josh Leo; Restless Heart

Restless Heart singles chronology
| "Familiar Pain" (1992) | "When She Cries" (1992) | "Mending Fences" (1993) |

Music video
- "When She Cries" on YouTube

"When She Cries" is a song written by Sonny LeMaire and Marc Beeson and performed by American country music group Restless Heart. It was released in August 1992 as the first single from their fifth studio album, Big Iron Horses. Being that it was the band's first album not to feature lead singer Larry Stewart, vocal duties were shared among the band members; drummer John Dittrich sings lead on "When She Cries".

Although the song reached only number nine on the US Billboard Hot Country Singles & Tracks chart compared to their collection of number-one hits, "When She Cries" was their greatest crossover success, reaching number 11 on the Billboard Hot 100. Worldwide, the song peaked at number six in Canada and number 10 in Iceland. The B-side of the cassette single features snippets of other songs on the album.

== Music video ==
The music video was directed by Wayne Miller and features the band performing in a warehouse of Eagle Built Systems Inc.

== Charts ==
=== Weekly charts ===
| Chart (1992–1993) | Peak position |
|---|---|
| Australia (ARIA) | 97 |
| Canada Top Singles (RPM) | 6 |
| Canada Adult Contemporary (RPM) | 29 |
| Canada Country Singles (RPM) | 9 |
| Iceland (Íslenski Listinn Topp 40) | 10 |
| US Billboard Hot 100 | 11 |
| US Adult Contemporary (Billboard) | 2 |
| US Hot Country Songs (Billboard) | 9 |
| US Pop Airplay (Billboard) | 4 |

| Chart (2024) | Peak position |
|---|---|
| Philippines (Philippines Hot 100) | 96 |

=== Year-end charts ===
| Chart (1993) | Position |
|---|---|
| Canada Top Singles (RPM) | 68 |
| US Billboard Hot 100 | 76 |
| US Adult Contemporary (Billboard) | 11 |

== Release history ==
| Region | Date | Format(s) | Label(s) | Ref. |
|---|---|---|---|---|
| United States | August 31, 1992 | —N/a | RCA | |
| Japan | April 21, 1993 | Mini-CD | RCA | |
| Australia | May 23, 1993 | CD; cassette | RCA | |
