= Tell Me What You Dream =

Single by Restless Heart

from the album Big Iron Horses
- Released: February 22, 1993
- Genre: Country, adult contemporary
- Length: 4:45
- Label: RCA Nashville
- Songwriters: Timothy B. Schmit; Josh Leo; Vince Melamed
- Producers: Josh Leo and Restless Heart

Restless Heart singles chronology
"Mending Fences" (1993)	"Tell Me What You Dream" (1993)	"We Got the Love" (1993)

"Tell Me What You Dream" is a song written by Timothy B. Schmit, Josh Leo and Vince Melamed. While first performed on Schmit's solo album Playin' It Cool, its most well-known version was performed by country group Restless Heart along with saxophonist Warren Hill. The single was the group's only number one on the adult contemporary chart, spending two weeks on top, and despite previous country chart success, the song did not make the country top 40. "Tell Me What You Dream" narrowly missed the Top 40 on the Billboard Hot 100, peaking at number forty-three.

== Music video ==
The music video was directed by Daniela Federici and premiered in early 1993.

== Chart performance ==
Chart (1993)	Peak position
U.S. Billboard Adult Contemporary	1
U.S. Billboard Hot 100	43
U.S. Billboard Pop Songs	38
Canadian RPM Adult Contemporary Tracks	1
Canadian RPM Top Singles	14
