= The Bluest Eyes in Texas =

Single by Restless Heart

from the album Big Dreams in a Small Town
- B-side: "El Dorado"
- Released: May 13, 1988
- Genre: Country
- Length: 3:54 (single version); 4:45 (album version)
- Label: RCA Nashville
- Songwriter(s): Tim DuBois; Dave Robbins; Van Stephenson
- Producer(s): Tim DuBois, Scott Hendricks, Restless Heart

Restless Heart singles chronology
"Wheels" (1987)	"The Bluest Eyes in Texas" (1988)	"A Tender Lie" (1988)

"The Bluest Eyes in Texas" (originally released as "Bluest Eyes in Texas") is a song written by Tim DuBois, Dave Robbins and Van Stephenson, and recorded by American country music group Restless Heart. It was released in May 1988 as the lead single from Restless Heart's album Big Dreams in a Small Town.

== Background ==
In the United States, the single reached the top position in the Billboard Hot Country Songs chart in 1988. In Canada, the single peaked at the number-two position on the RPM Country Tracks chart.

Bill Balsley directed the song's music video, which premiered in early 1988.

Song co-writers Robbins and Stephenson later joined with Henry Paul to form the country group BlackHawk in 1992.

== Content ==
In the song, the narrator sings that he has just left his girlfriend. He questions the reason for their break-up, but says that he is trying to move on. He bemoans that can't forget her blue eyes, and that they haunt him.

== Inspiration ==
In an interview with The Boot, Robbins said that Van Stephenson provided the idea of the song when he started telling them about an old girlfriend from high school who he bumped into recently. He dated her until her family moved to Texas. When they reunited, all he could think about was how blue her eyes were.

== Chart performance ==
Chart (1988)	Peak position
US Hot Country Songs (Billboard)	1
Canadian RPM Country Tracks	2

=== Year-end charts ===
Chart (1988)	Position
Canadian RPM Country Tracks	32
US Hot Country Songs (Billboard)	5

== Cover versions ==
Chloë Sevigny sang a cover version in her role as Lana Tisdel in Kimberly Peirce's 1999 film Boys Don't Cry. A Camp (Nina Persson and Nathan Larson) also covered the song in a studio recording for the film's closing credits and soundtrack album.
