= Warren Hill (musician) =

Canadian jazz saxophonist

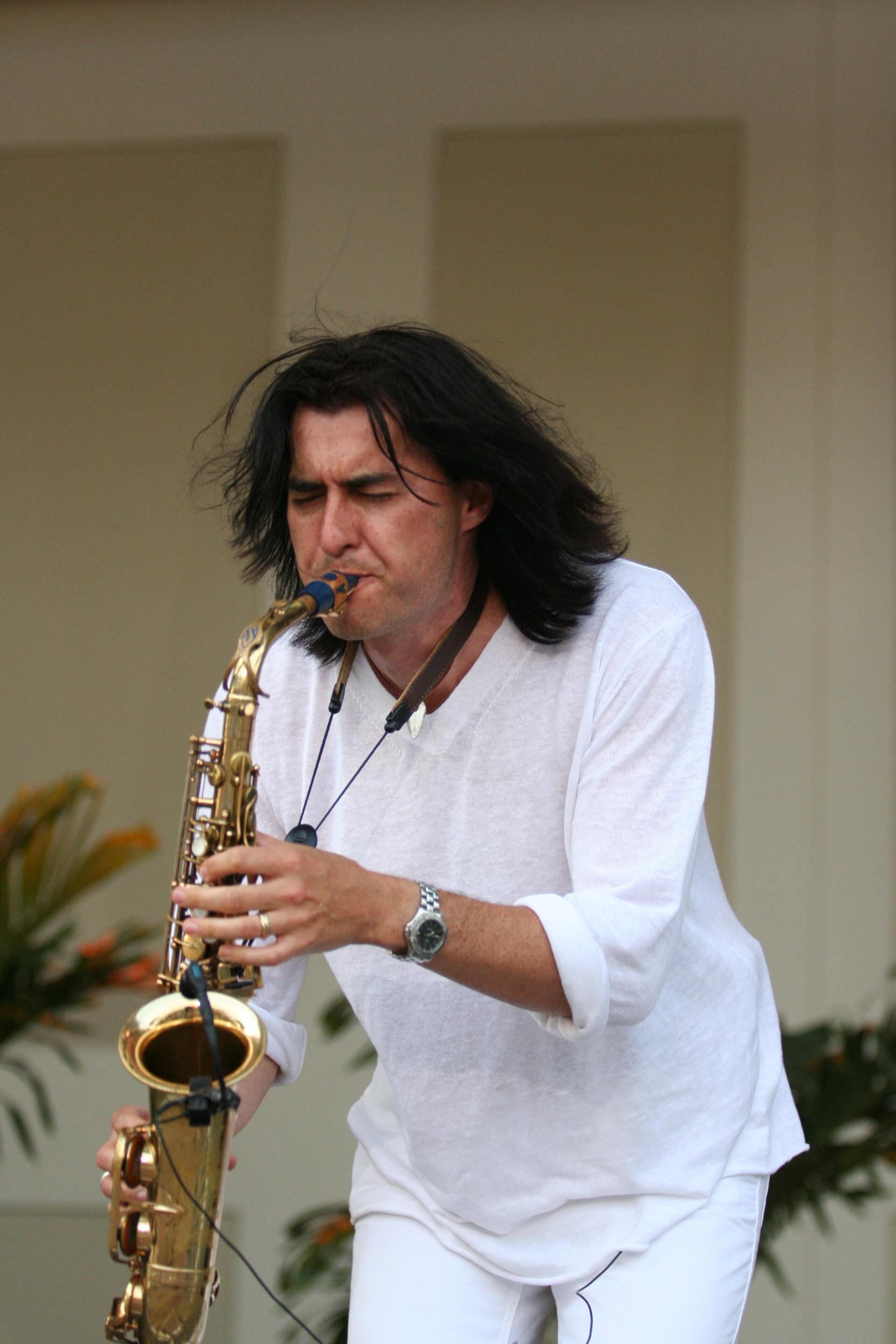
- Warren Hill in 2007

Background information
- Born: April 15, 1966 (age 60); Toronto, Ontario, Canada
- Genres: Jazz, smooth jazz
- Occupation: Musician
- Instrument: Alto Saxophone
- Years active: 1988–present
- Labels: RCA, Discovery, Narada, Koch
- Website: warrenhill.com

Warren Hill (born April 15, 1966) is a smooth jazz alto saxophonist from Toronto, Canada.

Hill was discovered in 1988 while performing at his graduation from Berklee College of Music in Boston. Record producer Russ Titelman, who was in the audience, invited him to record on an album by Chaka Khan. After moving to Los Angeles, he signed with RCA in 1989 and recorded his debut album, Kiss Under the Moon. He supported Natalie Cole on tour for her album Unforgettable and had a hit in 1993 with the song "The Passion Theme" from the movie Body of Evidence.

In the smooth jazz format his number one hits include "Our First Dance", "Do You Feel What I'm Feeling", "Mambo 2000", "Tamara", "Still in Love", La Dolce Vita", "Promises", "Take Out Dreams", "Tears in Heaven", "Another Goodbye", "Tell Me All Your Secrets", "You Are the One", and "Turn Out the Lights". Warren and his wife Tamara VanCleef-Hill wrote and produced the song "Shelter from the Storm". He was featured on the song "Tell Me What You Dream" by Restless Heart and "Baby I Love Your Way" by Big Mountain. He appeared on the television show Top of the Pops on the BBC in England. Hill founded a smooth jazz cruise in 2004. He is also the host and owner of the Cancun Jazz Festival, has established his brand of instruments, and co-founded the label, Songbird Records.

His album Devotion came out in 1993 and Truth a year later. By 1997, he had switched to Discovery, which released Shelter (1997) and Life Thru Rose Colored Glasses (1998). Love Life (2000) was released by Narada, followed by Love Songs and A Warren Hill Christmas in 2002 and PopJazz in 2005. In 2008, he signed with Koch, which issued La Dolce Vita in June that year.

== Instruments ==
On the alto saxophone he uses Blue Jumbo Java mouthpiece from Vandoren which sounds sharp and dry. Since Vandoren stopped producing Blue Jumbo Java mouthpieces, the price of them second-hand has risen sharply.

== Discography ==
=== Albums ===
| Year | Title | Chart | | |
| Year | Title | US Jazz | US Con. Jazz | Label |
|---|---|---|---|---|
| 1991 | Kiss Under the Moon | | 11 | RCA |
| 1993 | Devotion | 8 | 6 | RCA |
| 1994 | Truth | 7 | 6 | RCA |
| 1997 | Shelter | 13 | 8 | Discovery |
| 1998 | Life Thru Rose Colored Glasses | 27 | 18 | Discovery |
| 2000 | Love Life | 14 | 10 | Narada |
| 2002 | Love Songs | 16 | | Narada |
| 2002 | A Warren Hill Christmas | 48 | | Narada |
| 2005 | PopJazz | 28 | 17 | PopJazz |
| 2008 | La Dolce Vita | 46 | | Koch |
| 2012 | Christmas with Warren Hill | | | SUGO Music Group |

=== Singles ===
| Year | Title | Chart Positions | Album |
| Year | Title | US Smooth Jazz | Album |
|---|---|---|---|
| 2008 | "La Dolce Vita" | 2 | La Dolce Vita |
| 2009 | "Mojo" | 30 | La Dolce Vita |
| 2012 | "Play It Like You Mean It" | | |

=== Guest singles ===
| Year | Title | Artist | Chart Positions | | | | | Album |
| Year | Title | Artist | US Smooth Jazz | US | US AC | CAN | CAN AC | Album |
|---|---|---|---|---|---|---|---|---|
| 1993 | "Tell Me What You Dream" | Restless Heart | — | 43 | 1 | 14 | 1 | Big Iron Horses |
| 2008 | "On the Upside" | Steve Oliver | 25 | — | — | — | — | One Night Live |
