= Tim DuBois =

American songwriter

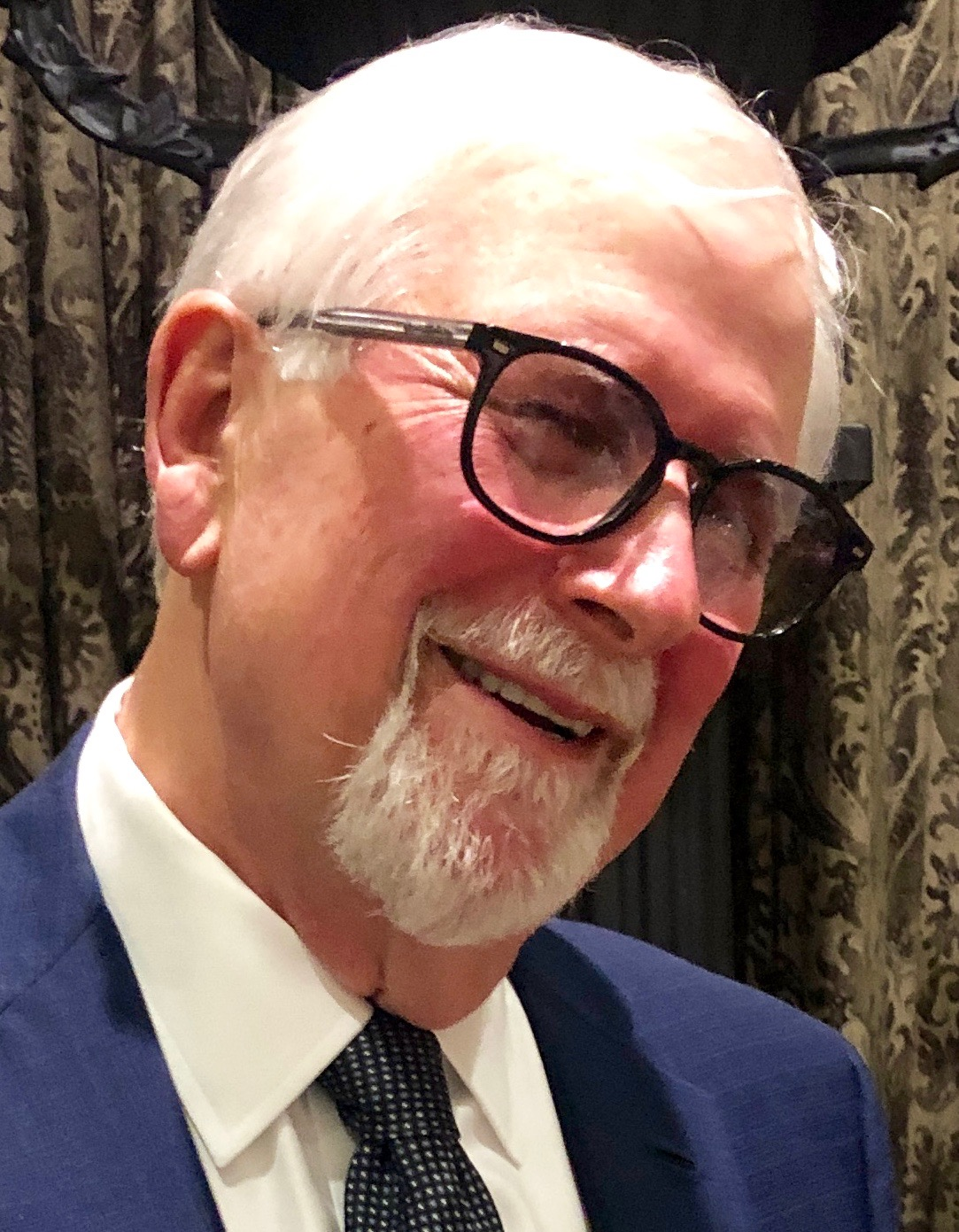
- in Nashville, October 17, 2019
- Born: James Timothy DuBois; May 4, 1948 (age 78); Southwest City, Missouri, U.S.
- Education: Oklahoma State University
- Occupations: Songwriter; record producer; talent manager; music executive
- Years active: 1977–present
- Spouse: Pamela S DuBois
- Children: Jamie Grace DuBois

James Timothy DuBois (born May 4, 1948) is an American accountant, songwriter, and recording industry executive based in Nashville. He has headed both Arista Records and Universal South Records, and as a songwriter, he has written five No. 1 country hits, including "Love in the First Degree" which was a world-wide hit recorded by the group Alabama.

DuBois started playing guitar in bands as a youth. He received three academic scholarships to Oklahoma State University (OSU) to study accounting, earned two advanced degrees, and worked as a senior financial analyst for the Texas Federal Reserve Bank. He also worked for Arthur Andersen. While pursuing his PhD, DuBois became interested in country music and began writing songs. This eventually led him to move to Nashville to pursue music. Writing successful songs led him to become a record producer, creating over 20 No. 1 and top five singles and more than a dozen gold, platinum, and double-platinum country albums. He founded the musical group Restless Heart in 1984, and Clive Davis hired him in 1989 to establish a Nashville office of Arista Records. He discovered and signed country artists Alan Jackson, Brooks & Dunn, The Tractors, Brad Paisley, Blackhawk, Pam Tillis and Diamond Rio.

DuBois was known as the "most powerful person in the music industry" by Business Nashville in 1996, "Record Executive of the Year" in 1992 by Pollstar, and was included in Entertainment Weekly's list of the "101 Most Powerful People in Entertainment" in 1994 and 1995. He is a member of Oklahoma State University's Hall of Fame (1996) and was the school's Accounting Alumnus of the year (1992).

== Early career in accounting ==
He was born in Southwest City, Missouri. He started playing guitar in rock bands as a youth in nearby Grove, Oklahoma. He is a citizen of the Cherokee Nation. In his senior year of high school, a camp roommate wrote a song; DuBois was interested in song lyrics. He attended Oklahoma State University and studied accounting, winning three scholarships: an Arthur Andersen Scholarship, an Atlantic Richfield Scholarship and an Oklahoma State Regents Scholarship. He received a bachelor's in accounting in 1971 and a master's in 1972, and he became a Certified Public Accountant (CPA).

He worked for the Arthur Andersen firm for about a year, then took a job in Dallas as a financial analyst for the Texas Federal Reserve Bank. During his time in Texas, he became interested in country music and pursued songwriting in his spare time. While attending an accounting convention in Dallas, he met up with his former professors, who convinced him to return to Oklahoma State to enter the PhD program at OSU's Spears School of Business. While in the PhD program, he said, "I'm a true left-brain, right-brain conflict, but it has served me very well".

== Reorienting career to music ==
In 1975, he met Scott Hendricks, another Oklahoma State student. Dubois and Hendricks, along with DuBois's younger brother (also a musician), headed to Nashville.

In 1979, he was given his first job as a publishing company staff songwriter by Bob Montgomery for $75 a week. From 1979 to 1985, DuBois worked as both a publishing company staff writer and as an accounting professor. Throughout that period, DuBois composed over 20 country singles. In 1980, he got a job teaching at Owen Graduate School of Management and he had three hit songs on the country charts: "Midnight Hauler" (Razzy Bailey); "Love in the First Degree" (Alabama); and "She Got the Goldmine (I Got the Shaft)" (Jerry Reed). DuBois opened the Nashville branch of Los Angeles-based artist management firm Fitzgerald-Hartley in 1986. Country artist Vince Gill became a Fitzgerald-Hartley client. DuBois and Gill collaborated on some songwriting projects, including the song "When I Call Your Name".

In 1989, Clive Davis, founder of Arista Records, appointed DuBois to open the Nashville division of the label. Arista Nashville sold 80 million albums in its first eleven years of business, breaking acts like Alan Jackson, Brooks & Dunn, Pam Tillis, Diamond Rio and Brad Paisley. DuBois later joined producer Tony Brown to operate Universal South Records.

In 1991, DuBois married Pamela Smith from Dallas, Texas, a friend he had known for fifteen years. Their daughter, Jamie Grace DuBois, was born in 1994.

In 2007, DuBois returned to the faculty of Vanderbilt's Owen Graduate School of Management, where he is developing courses related to the music business. He has also joined forces with Marc Dottore to form Dottore-DuBois Artist Management. DuBois resides in Nashville, Tennessee. ASCAP announced in February 2010 that they would relocate their Nashville location to a DuBois-led regional office. DuBois holds the positions of Vice President and Managing Executive. After restructuring ASCAP, DuBois was asked to join London Broadcast Company in January 2012. He started a joint venture called AMP (Artists, Managers, Partners).

== Organizations ==
DuBois serves on the boards of the Country Music Association, the Academy of Country Music, the Americana Music Association, and SunTrust Bank, and as chairman of the Nashville Convention and Visitors Bureau. He is a past board member of Leadership Music, Country Music Foundation, National Academy of Recording Arts & Sciences, Nashville Songwriters Foundation, and Nashville Songwriters Association International.

== Awards and recognition ==
Tim DuBois has received recognition as "Record Executive of the Year" by Pollstar and as one of the "101 Most Powerful People" in the entertainment industry by Entertainment Weekly. He was inducted into Oklahoma State University's Hall of Fame in 1996. Throughout his songwriting career, DuBois has earned five number-one singles, 24 top-ten singles, six ASCAP Awards, nine BMI Country Awards, two BMI Pop Awards and a number of other accolades.

=== Songwriting awards ===
Organization	Award	Song	Date
Country Music Association	Song of the Year	"When I Call Your Name"	1991
Academy of Country Music	Song of the Year Nomination	"When I Call Your Name"	1991
Grammy Awards	Song of the Year Nomination	"When I Call Your Name"	1991
Music City News Awards	Single of the Year	"When I Call Your Name"	1991
Nashville Songwriters Association International	Award of Merit	"When I Call Your Name"	1991
Academy of Country Music	Song of the Year Nomination	"She Got the Goldmine (I Got the Shaft)"	1982
Grammy Awards	Song of the Year Nomination	"She Got the Goldmine (I Got the Shaft)"	1982
Nashville Songwriters Association International	Award of Merit	"She Got the Goldmine (I Got the Shaft)"	1982
Academy of Country Music	Song of the Year Nomination	"Love in the First Degree"	1982
Music City News Awards	Top Country Hits Awards	"Love in the First Degree"	1982
Nashville Songwriters Association International	Songwriter of the Year Finalist		1982

=== Discography ===
Title	Artist
A Good Nights Love	Tammy Wynette
A Good Old Fashioned Saturday Night Honky	Vernon Oxford
Tonk Barroom Brawl	Vernon Oxford
Back To The Heartbreak Kid	Kathy Mattea
Back To The Heartbreak Kid	Restless Heart
Big Dreams In A Small Town	Restless Heart
Blind Faith And The Naked Truth	Razzy Bailey
Blue Rendevouz	Lloyd David Foster
Crazy Blue	Billy Montana
Dancys Dream	Restless Heart
Don't Ask The Reason Why	Secret Of My Success
D-R-U-N-K	David Allen Coe
Few And Far Between	Restless Heart
Gone Away	Steve Ripley
Hard Times	Restless Heart
Have Your Memory Come Again	Kenny Dale
Heartbreak Kid	Juice Newton
Heaven Sent	Sylvia
Heaven Sent	Bryan White
Hummingbird	Ricky Skaggs
Hummingbird	Restless Heart
I Forgot How Bad My Good Woman Can Be	Razzy Bailey
I Love The Way She Keeps Me In The Dark	Conway Twitty
I Was Meant To Be With You	Diamond Rio
It's Been One Of Those Days	Bobby Vinton
It's Been One Of Those Days	Lang Scott
I've Never Been So Sure	Restless Heart
Jenny Come Back	Restless Heart
Jesse's Soul	Radney Foster
Julie Do I Ever Cross Your Mind	Wood Newton
Let The Heartache Ride	Restless Heart
Love In The First Degree	Alabama
Love The Hurt Away	Wood Newton
Love Will Get Your Through Time With No Money	The Girls Next Door
Midnight Hauler	Razzy Bailey
Oklahoma Swing	Vince Gill & Reba McEntire
Quittin' Time	Asleep At The Wheel
Restless Heart	Juice Newton
Restless Heart	Restless Heart
Say You'll Stay	Wayne Massey
She Got The Goldmine	Johnny Paycheck
She Got The Goldmine	Jerry Reed
She's Got A Drinkin' Problem	Gary Stewart
She's Got A Drinkin' Problem	Johnny Paycheck
Somewhere There's A Love Song	Charlie Rich
Southern Comfort	Joe Stampley
Straight For Your Love	Terri Heart
Sweet Temptation	The Kendalls
Sweet Red Wine	Gary Morris
Tell Your Dream To Me	Marty Robbins
The Bluest Eyes In Texas	Restless Heart
The Boys On A Roll	Restless Heart
The Truth Hurts	Restless Heart
This Road	Mike Reid
This Time	Restless Heart
Too Many Hearts In The Fire	Bobby Smith
Tryin To Get To New Orleans	The Tractors
Unconditional Love	Glen Campbell
Victim Of The Game	Restless Heart
We Owned This Town	Restless Heart
When I Call Your Name	Vince Gill
Who Better Than an Angel	Janie Frickie
Working Woman	Rob Crosby
You Seen One You Seen 'em All	Bettye Lovette
You Seen One You Seen 'em All	Ruth Ann
You've Got The Touch	Lloyd David Foster

=== Record production credits ===
Artist	Title	Record label	Date	Award or recognition
Blackhawk	Strong Enough	Arista Records	1996	Certified Gold
Diamond Rio	IV	Arista Records	1995	Certified Gold
Blackhawk	Blackhawk	Arista Records	1994	Certified Double Platinum
Diamond Rio	Love A Little Stronger	Arista Records	1994	Certified Platinum
Diamond Rio	Close to the Edge	Arista Records	1993	Certified Gold
Steve Wariner	Drive	Arista Records	1993	
Diamond Rio	Diamond Rio	Arista Records	1991	Certified Platinum
Exile	Justice	Arista Records	1991	
Steve Wariner	I Am Ready	Arista Records	1991	Certified Gold
Restless Heart	The Best of Restless Heart	RCA Records	1991	
Exile	Still Standing	Arista Records	1990	
Restless Heart	Fast Movin’ Train	RCA Records	1990	Certified Gold
Restless Heart	Big Dreams In A Small Town	RCA Records	1988	Certified Gold
Restless Heart	Wheels	RCA Records	1986	Certified Gold
Restless Heart	Restless Heart	RCA Records	1985	

=== Song production credits ===
Title	Artist
(Back to The) Heartbreak Kid	Restless Heart
Big Dreams In A Small Town	Restless Heart
Gone Away	
Heaven Sent	
Hummingbird	Restless Heart
Hummingbird	Ricky Skaggs
I Was Meant To Be With You	
Jesse's Soul	
Love In the First Degree	
Midnight Hauler	Razzy Bailey
Oklahoma Swing	Vince Gill, Reba McEntire
Quittin’ Time	
She Got the Goldmine (I Got the Shaft)	
She's Got A Drinking Problem	
The Bluest Eyes In Texas	Restless Heart
