= Scott Hendricks =

American record producer (born 1956)

- Born: July 26, 1956 (age 70)
- Origin: Clinton, Oklahoma, United States
- Genres: Country
- Occupation: Record producer
- Years active: 1978–present
- Website: http://scotthendricks.info/

Scott Hendricks (born July 26, 1956) is an American record producer who has produced over 30 country music artists. His productions have garnered 121 Top 10s, and 78 Number One hits. Between 1995 and 1997, he was president and chief executive officer of Capitol Records Nashville. Between 1998 and 2001 he served as president and CEO of Virgin Nashville. He now serves as Warner Music Nashville's Executive Vice President of A&R. Acts for whom Hendricks has produced include Restless Heart, John Michael Montgomery, Brooks & Dunn, Trace Adkins, Alan Jackson, Faith Hill, Blake Shelton, Jana Kramer, Dan + Shay, Michael Ray, William Michael Morgan, Drew Parker and Tegan Marie.

== Biography ==
Scott Hendricks was born in Clinton, Oklahoma. While attending Oklahoma State University, Hendricks met Tim DuBois (who later would serve as President of Arista Nashville) and Greg Jennings (who later became a member of the band Restless Heart). Hendricks moved to Nashville, Tennessee in 1978, first working as an engineer in a studio owned by Tompall & the Glaser Brothers with legendary producer Jimmy Bowen. Hendricks would also assist producer Barry Beckett in his work with Hank Williams Jr., Alabama, Etta James, and many others.

His first work as a producer came in 1985 when he and DuBois co-produced Restless Heart's debut album. Over the next decade he produced several artists, such as Alan Jackson, Brooks & Dunn, Trace Adkins, Faith Hill, John Michael Montgomery, Steve Wariner, and Suzy Bogguss. In 1991 he founded the music publishing company Big Tractor, whose writers penned “I Saw God Today” for George Strait and “Amazed” for Lonestar.

In 1995, Hendricks was hired as President and CEO of Capitol Records Nashville. There, he oversaw the careers of Garth Brooks and Deana Carter as well as signing Keith Urban, and Trace Adkins.

Hendricks exited Capitol in 1997 and took over as president and CEO of Virgin Records' Nashville division; where he served from its establishment in 1998 until its dissolution in 2001. He then returned to his independent work as a producer. In 2007, Hendricks joined Warner Music Nashville as the Senior Vice President of A&R.

In addition to his A&R duties at Warner, Hendricks’ producing efforts have been instrumental in Blake Shelton's ascent from mid-level act to bona fide star with 27 No. 1 singles, including “Hillbilly Bone,” a duet with Trace Adkins which won an ACM Award for Best Collaboration in 2011.

In April of 2014, Hendricks was promoted to Executive Vice President of A&R at Warner Music Nashville.

Hendricks was inducted into the Oklahoma State University Hall of Fame in 2000 and the Oklahoma Music Hall of Fame in 2015. He was inducted by Blake Shelton into Oklahoma's highest honor, the Oklahoma Hall of Fame in 2021.

== Number One Singles Produced ==
Year	Song	Artist
2025	Texas	Blake Shelton
2025	Bigger Houses	Dan + Shay
2024	Save Me The Trouble	Dan + Shay
2023	You	Dan + Shay
2020	Happy Anywhere (featuring Gwen Stefani)	Blake Shelton
2020	Nobody But You (with Gwen Stefani)	Blake Shelton
2019	All To Myself	Dan + Shay
2019	God's Country	Blake Shelton
2019	One That Got Away	Michael Ray
2018	Speechless	Dan + Shay
2018	Tequila	Dan + Shay
2017	I'll Name The Dogs	Blake Shelton
2017	Every Time I Hear That Song	Blake Shelton
2017	How Not To	Dan + Shay
2017	Think A Little Less	Michael Ray
2017	A Guy With A Girl	Blake Shelton
2016	I Met A Girl	William Michael Morgan
2016	From The Ground Up	Dan + Shay
2016	Came Here To Forget	Blake Shelton
2015	Young & Crazy	Frankie Ballard
2015	Nothin' Like You	Dan + Shay
2015	Kiss You In The Morning	Michael Ray
2015	Gonna	Blake Shelton
2015	Sangria	Blake Shelton
2015	Lonely Tonight	Blake Shelton feat. Ashley Monroe
2014	Helluva Life	Frankie Ballard
2014	Neon Light	Blake Shelton
2014	My Eyes	Blake Shelton
2014	Doin' What She Likes	Blake Shelton
2013	Sure Be Cool If You Did	Blake Shelton
2013	Mine Would Be You	Blake Shelton
2013	Boys 'Round Here	Blake Shelton feat. Pistol Annies & Friends
2012	Over	Blake Shelton
2012	Drink On It	Blake Shelton
2011	God Gave Me You	Blake Shelton
2011	Honey Bee	Blake Shelton
2011	Who Are You When I'm Not Looking	Blake Shelton
2010	All About Tonight	Blake Shelton
2010	Hillbilly Bone	Blake Shelton feat. Trace Adkins
2009	She Wouldn't Be Gone	Blake Shelton
1997	I Left Something Turned On At Home	Trace Adkins
1997	(This Ain't) No Thinkin' Thing	Trace Adkins
1996	Long As I Live	John Michael Montgomery
1996	Heart's Desire	Lee Roy Parnell
1996	Home	Alan Jackson
1995	I Can Love You Like That	John Michael Montgomery
1995	A Little Bit Of You	Lee Roy Parnell
1995	Little Miss Honky Tonk	Brooks & Dunn
1995	You're Gonna Miss Me When I'm Gone	Brooks & Dunn
1995	Sold	John Michael Montgomery
1995	It Matters To Me	Faith Hill
1994	I'm Holding My Own	Lee Roy Parnell
1994	If You've Got Love	John Michael Montgomery
1994	Piece Of My Heart	Faith Hill
1994	That Ain't No Way To Go	Brooks & Dunn
1994	Be My Baby Tonight	John Michael Montgomery
1994	She's Not The Cheatin' Kind	Brooks & Dunn
1993	Wild One	Faith Hill
1993	Tonight I Climbed The Wall	Alan Jackson
1993	We'll Burn That Bridge	Brooks & Dunn
1993	She Used To Be Mine	Brooks & Dunn
1993	I Swear	John Michael Montgomery
1993	Tender Moment	Lee Roy Parnell
1992	The Tips Of My Fingers	Steve Wariner
1992	Dallas	Alan Jackson
1992	Neon Moon	Brooks & Dunn
1992	Love's Got A Hold On You	Alan Jackson
1992	Boot Scootin' Boogie	Brooks & Dunn
1991	Someday	Alan Jackson
1991	My Next Broken Heart	Brooks & Dunn
1991	Brand New Man	Brooks & Dunn
1991	Don't Rock The Jukebox	Alan Jackson
1990	Wanted	Alan Jackson
1990	Here In The Real World	Alan Jackson
1990	Chasin' That Neon Rainbow	Alan Jackson
1988	Fast Movin' Train	Restless Heart
1988	The Bluest Eyes In Texas	Restless Heart
1988	A Tender Lie	Restless Heart
1988	Wheels	Restless Heart
1987	Why Does It Have To Be (Wrong or Right)	Restless Heart
1987	That Rock Won't Roll	Restless Heart
1986	I'll Still Be Loving You	Restless Heart

== Top Ten Singles Produced ==
Year	Song	Artist
1986	That Rock Won't Roll	Restless Heart
1986	I'll Still Be Loving You	Restless Heart
1987	Why Does It Have To Be (Wrong or Right)	Restless Heart
1988	Wheels	Restless Heart
1988	A Tender Lie	Restless Heart
1988	The Bluest Eyes In Texas	Restless Heart
1988	Fast Movin' Train	Restless Heart
1990	Chasin' That Neon Rainbow	Alan Jackson
1990	Here In The Real World	Alan Jackson
1990	Wanted	Alan Jackson
1991	Don't Rock The Jukebox	Alan Jackson
1991	Brand New Man	Brooks & Dunn
1991	My Next Broken Heart	Brooks & Dunn
1991	Someday	Alan Jackson
1992	Boot Scootin' Boogie	Brooks & Dunn
1992	Love's Got A Hold On You	Alan Jackson
1992	Neon Moon	Brooks & Dunn
1992	Dallas	Alan Jackson
1992	The Tips Of My Fingers	Steve Wariner
1993	Tender Moment	Lee Roy Parnell
1993	I Swear	John Michael Montgomery
1993	She Used To Be Mine	Brooks & Dunn
1993	We'll Burn That Bridge	Brooks & Dunn
1993	Tonight I Climbed The Wall	Alan Jackson
1993	Wild One	Faith Hill
1994	She's Not The Cheatin' Kind	Brooks & Dunn
1994	Be My Baby Tonight	John Michael Montgomery
1994	That Ain't No Way To Go	Brooks & Dunn
1994	Piece Of My Heart	Faith Hill
1994	If You've Got Love	John Michael Montgomery
1994	I'm Holding My Own	Lee Roy Parnell
1995	It Matters To Me	Faith Hill
1995	Sold	John Michael Montgomery
1995	You're Gonna Miss Me When I'm Gone	Brooks & Dunn
1995	Little Miss Honky Tonk	Brooks & Dunn
1995	A Little Bit Of You	Lee Roy Parnell
1995	I Can Love You Like That	John Michael Montgomery
1996	Home	Alan Jackson
1996	Heart's Desire	Lee Roy Parnell
1996	Long As I Live	John Michael Montgomery
1997	(This Ain't) No Thinkin' Thing	Trace Adkins
1997	I Left Something Turned On At Home	Trace Adkins
2009	She Wouldn't Be Gone	Blake Shelton
2010	Hillbilly Bone	Blake Shelton feat. Trace Adkins
2010	All About Tonight	Blake Shelton
2011	Who Are You When I'm Not Looking	Blake Shelton
2011	Honey Bee	Blake Shelton
2011	God Gave Me You	Blake Shelton
2012	Drink On It	Blake Shelton
2012	Over	Blake Shelton
2013	Boys 'Round Here	Blake Shelton feat. Pistol Annies & Friends
2013	Mine Would Be You	Blake Shelton
2013	Sure Be Cool If You Did	Blake Shelton
2014	Doin' What She Likes	Blake Shelton
2014	My Eyes	Blake Shelton
2014	Neon Light	Blake Shelton
2014	Helluva Life	Frankie Ballard
2015	Lonely Tonight	Blake Shelton feat. Ashley Monroe
2015	Sangria	Blake Shelton
2015	Gonna	Blake Shelton
2015	Kiss You In The Morning	Michael Ray
2015	Nothin' Like You	Dan + Shay
2015	Young & Crazy	Frankie Ballard
2016	Came Here To Forget	Blake Shelton
2016	From The Ground Up	Dan + Shay
2016	I Met A Girl	William Michael Morgan
2017	A Guy With A Girl	Blake Shelton
2017	Think A Little Less	Michael Ray
2017	How Not To	Dan + Shay
2017	Every Time I Hear That Song	Blake Shelton
2017	I'll Name The Dogs	Blake Shelton
2018	Tequila	Dan + Shay
2019	God's Country	Blake Shelton
2019	All To Myself	Dan + Shay
