= Ty Herndon discography =

- Studio albums: 9
- Compilation albums: 1
- Singles: 26
- #1 Singles: 3

Ty Herndon is an American country music artist. His discography consists of six studio albums and 26 singles. Of his singles, three of them reached number 1 on the Hot Country Songs charts: "What Mattered Most", "Living in a Moment", and "It Must Be Love".

== Studio albums ==
=== 1990s ===
Title	Album details	Peak chart positions			Certifications (sales thresholds)
Title	Album details	US Country	US	CAN Country	Certifications (sales thresholds)
What Mattered Most	Release date: April 18, 1995; Label: Epic Nashville; Formats: CD, cassette **	9	68	3	US: Gold
Living in a Moment	Release date: August 13, 1996; Label: Epic Nashville; Formats: CD, cassette **	6	65	18	US: Gold
Big Hopes	Release date: May 26, 1998; Label: Epic Nashville; Formats: CD, cassette **	22	140	31	
Steam	Release date: November 2, 1999; Label: Epic Nashville; Formats: CD, cassette **	14	124	—	
"—" denotes releases that did not chart "**" Now available for music download

=== 2000s and 2010s ===
Title	Album details	Peak chart positions	
Title	Album details	US Country	US Indie
Right About Now	Release date: January 9, 2007; Label: Titan/Pyramid/Quarterback/Fontana; Formats: CD, music download	41	24
Journey On	Release date: June 8, 2010; Label: FUNL; Formats: CD, music download	—	—
Lies I Told Myself	Release date: October 22, 2013; Label: FUNL; Formats: CD, music download	75	—
House on Fire	Release date: November 11, 2016; Label: FUNL; Formats: CD, music download	42	—
Got It Covered	Release date: August 23, 2019; Label: BFD; Formats: CD, music download	—	—
Jacob	Release date: July 15, 2022; Label: Pivotal Records; Formats: CD, music download	—	—
"—" denotes releases that did not chart

== Compilation albums ==
Title	Album details	Peak positions
Title	Album details	US Country
This Is Ty Herndon: Greatest Hits	Release date: March 26, 2002; Label: Epic Nashville; Formats: CD	32

== Holiday albums ==
Title	Album details
A Not So Silent Night	Release date: September 23, 2003; Label: Riviera Records; Formats: CD
A Ty Herndon Christmas	Release date: October 23, 2007; Label: Titan Pyramid; Formats: CD, music download
Regifted	Release date: November 26, 2020; Label: Self-released; Formats: CD, music download

== Singles ==
=== 1995–2000 ===
Year	Single	Peak chart positions			Album
Year	Single	US Country	US	CAN Country	Album
1995	"What Mattered Most"	1	90	1	What Mattered Most
1995	"I Want My Goodbye Back"	7	—	9	What Mattered Most
1995	"Heart Half Empty" (with Stephanie Bentley)	21	—	12	What Mattered Most
1996	"In Your Face"	63	—	58	What Mattered Most
1996	"Living in a Moment"	1	—	1	Living in a Moment
1996	"She Wants to Be Wanted Again"	21	—	19	Living in a Moment
1997	"Loved Too Much"	2	—	2	Living in a Moment
1997	"I Have to Surrender"	17	—	14	Living in a Moment
1998	"A Man Holdin' On (To a Woman Lettin' Go)"	5	81	14	Big Hopes
1998	"It Must Be Love" (with Sons of the Desert, uncredited)	1	38	10	Big Hopes
1999	"Hands of a Working Man"	5	47	18	Big Hopes
1999	"Steam"	18	83	19	Steam
2000	"No Mercy"	26	92	44	Steam
2000	"A Love Like That"	58	—	70	Steam
"—" denotes releases that did not chart

=== 2001–present ===
Year	Single	Peak positions		Album
Year	Single	US Christ. Digital	US Country	Album
2001	"Heather's Wall"	—	37	Non-album single
2002	"A Few Short Years"	—	55	This Is Ty Herndon: Greatest Hits
2006	"Right About Now"	—	—	Right About Now
2007	"Mighty Mighty Love"	—	—	Right About Now
2010	"Journey On"	—	—	Journey On
2011	"Stones"	—	—	Non-album single
2013	"Lies I Told Myself"	—	—	Lies I Told Myself
2016	"That Kind of Night"	—	—	House on Fire
2016	"Looking Back to See" (with Kim McAbee)	—	—	Non-album single
2022	"Til You Get There"	—	—	Jacob
2022	"God or the Gun"	—	—	Jacob
2023	"Dents on a Chevy" (with Terri Clark)	—	—	Jacob
2026	"Testify to Love" (with Michael Passions featuring Melissa Greene)	3	—	Non-album single
"—" denotes releases that did not chart

== Other charted songs ==
Year	Single	Peak positions	Album
Year	Single	US Country	Album
2000	"You Can Leave Your Hat On"	72	Steam

== Music videos ==
Year	Video	Director
1995	"What Mattered Most"	Steven Goldmann
1995	"I Want My Goodbye Back"	Steven Goldmann
1996	"Heart Half Empty" (with Stephanie Bentley)	Steven Goldmann
1996	"Living in a Moment"	Steven Goldmann
1997	"She Wants to Be Wanted Again"	Steven Goldmann
1997	"I Have to Surrender"	Steven Goldmann
1998	"A Man Holding On (To a Woman Lettin' Go)"	Steven Goldmann
1999	"Hands of a Working Man"	Chris Rogers
1999	"Steam"	Steven Goldmann
2000	"No Mercy"	Eric Welch
2002	"Heather's Wall"	Guy Guillet
2010	"Journey On"	Flick Wiltshire/Steven Goldmann
2013	"Lies I Told Myself"	Steven Goldmann
2016	"House on Fire"	
2018	"I Wanna Dance With Somebody"	Kasi Lemmons
2018	"Walking In Memphis"	Trent Atkinson
2018	"That Kind Of Night"	Gary Smith
2022	"God or the Gun"	Jacob White
