= This Is Ty Herndon: Greatest Hits =

Greatest hits album by Ty Herndon
- Released: March 26, 2002
- Recorded: 1994–2002
- Genre: Country
- Length: 50:49
- Label: Epic
- Producer: Doug Johnson; Joe Scaife; Byron Gallimore; Ed Seay; Biff Watson; Paul Worley

Ty Herndon chronology
Steam (1999)	This Is Ty Herndon: Greatest Hits (2002)	Right About Now (2007)

Singles from This Is Ty Herndon: Greatest Hits
- 1. "A Few Short Years" Released: June 17, 2002

Professional ratings
Review scores
Source	Rating
Allmusic	4/5 stars

This Is Ty Herndon: Greatest Hits is the first compilation album by American country music artist Ty Herndon, released on March 26, 2002 via Epic Nashville. It was the last project he released for the label. The compilation includes ten of his previous singles, along with three new tracks. Before its release, Herndon has a moderate hit with "Heather's Wall", the planned lead single from his scrapped fifth studio album.

Only one single was released, the song titled "A Few Short Years". It peaked at number 55 on the US Hot Country Songs chart, becoming his last entry to date on that chart. The compilation peaked at number 32 on the Top Country Albums chart.

== Content ==
This Is Ty Herndon: Greatest Hits includes 13 tracks. The first ten are all previous songs of his, including his number one hits "What Mattered Most", "Living in a Moment", and "It Must Be Love". Other notable hits included are "Hands of a Working Man" and "Loved Too Much". Three new tracks were recorded; all three were produced by Biff Watson and Paul Worley. He explained the song's message in an interview by saying, "Life is way too short. You have to fully live life every day and not miss the lessons. This song reminds me of that daily leap. When we shy away from life, we shy away from living."

== Track listing ==
No.	Title	Writer(s)	Length
1.	"What Mattered Most"	Gary Burr; Vince Melamed	3:41
2.	"Living in a Moment"	Pat Bunch; Doug Johnson	3:51
3.	"Steam"	Lewis Anderson; Bob Regan	3:37
4.	"It Must Be Love"	Craig Bickhardt; Jack Sundrud	3:32
5.	"Hands of a Working Man"	Jim Collins; D. Vincent Williams	3:47
6.	"Loved Too Much"	Don Schlitz; Billy Livsey	3:40
7.	"Heart Half Empty" (duet with Stephanie Bentley)	Burr; Desmond Child	4:56
8.	"I Want My Goodbye Back"	Dave Berg; Bunch; Johnson	3:23
9.	"A Man Holdin' On (To a Woman Lettin' Go)"	Gene Dobbins; John Ramey; Bobby Taylor	3:38
10.	"You Can Leave Your Hat On"	Randy Newman	4:39
11.	"If the Road Runs Out"	David Frasier; Tom Wurth; Bill Luther	4:03
12.	"A Few Short Years"	Sonny Tillis; Bobby Tomberlin	3:49
13.	"I'd Move Heaven and Earth"	Bickhardt; Sundrud	4:13
Total length:			50:49

== Personnel for new tracks ==
- Matt Chamberlain - drums
- J.T. Corenflos - electric guitar
- Melodie Crittenden - background vocals
- Larry Franklin - fiddle
- Paul Franklin - steel guitar
- Ty Herndon - lead vocals
- Wes Hightower - background vocals
- David Huff - drum programming, percussion
- Sonya Isaacs - background vocals
- Troy Johnson - background vocals
- Paul Leim - drums
- Jerry McPherson - electric guitar
- Steve Nathan - Hammond organ, piano, synthesizer
- Alison Prestwood - bass guitar
- Darrell Scott - acoustic guitar, mandolin
- Biff Watson - acoustic guitar, electric guitar
- Jonathan Yudkin - celtic harp, fiddle

== Charts ==
Chart (2002)	Peak position
US Top Country Albums (Billboard)	32
