= Big Hopes =

Studio album by Ty Herndon
- Released: May 26, 1998
- Studio: Essential Sound Studios, Sound Stage Studios, The Work Station, The Money Pit, Starstruck Studios, Loud Recording, OmniSound Studios, Seventeen Grand Recording, Emerald Sound Studios, The Music Mill, Soundshop Recording Studios and Pride Music Group Studio (Nashville, Tennessee)
- Genre: Country
- Length: 40:50
- Label: Epic
- Producer: Byron Gallimore (tracks 1, 3-7) Doug Johnson (tracks 2, 8-11)

Ty Herndon chronology
Living in a Moment (1997)	Big Hopes (1998)	Steam (1999)

Singles from Big Hopes
- 1. "A Man Holdin' On (To a Woman Lettin' Go)" Released: March 23, 1998; 2. "It Must Be Love" Released: August 10, 1998; 3. "Hands of a Working Man" Released: January 4, 1999

Big Hopes is the third studio album by American country music artist Ty Herndon. It features the singles "A Man Holding On (To a Woman Lettin' Go)", "It Must Be Love", and "Hands of a Working Man". These songs peaked at #5, #1, and #5, respectively, on the Billboard Hot Country Singles & Tracks (now Hot Country Songs) charts. "It Must Be Love" was his third and final Number One on the country charts, while "Hands of a Working Man" was his last Top Ten.

Doug Virden and Drew Womack, then members of Sons of the Desert, serve as backing vocalists on other tracks, as they did on Herndon's previous album Living in a Moment. Blue Miller, formerly of Bob Seger's Silver Bullet Band and later of the Gibson/Miller Band, also provides background vocals.

Thom Owens of Allmusic rated the album three stars out of five, saying that it "comes as close to MOR rock and pop as it does to country."

== Track listing ==
No.	Title	Writer(s)	Length
1.	"Big Hopes"	Walt Wilkins	3:46
2.	"It Must Be Love"	Craig Bickhardt, Jack Sundrud	3:31
3.	"A Man Holdin' On (To a Woman Lettin' Go)"	Bobby Taylor, Gene Dobbins, John Ramey	3:36
4.	"Big Time Dreamer"	Gary Burr, Victoria Shaw	3:51
5.	"Thinkin' with My Heart Again"	Donny Kees, Sanger D. Shafer, Dean Dillon	3:08
6.	"Somewhere a Lover"	Tim Ryan Rouillier, Alex Harvey	3:40
7.	"Hands of a Working Man"	D. Vincent Williams, Jim Collins	3:47
8.	"How Much Can One Man Love You"	Burr, Bob DiPiero	3:41
9.	"The Only Way I Know"	Burr, Mike Reid	4:17
10.	"No Brakes"	Pat Bunch, Shane Teeters	2:46
11.	"Tears in God's Eyes"	Skip Ewing, Kim Williams, Kent Blazy	4:36

== Personnel ==
Compiled from liner notes.

=== Musicians ===
- Ty Herndon – lead vocals
- Steve Nathan – keyboards
- Steven Conn – accordion (1, 3–7)
- John Hobbs – keyboards (2, 8–11)
- Larry Byrom – electric guitars (1, 3–7)
- Jeff King – acoustic guitars (1, 3–7)
- B. James Lowry – acoustic guitars (1, 3–7)
- Brent Mason – electric guitars (1, 3–7)
- Steve Gibson – electric guitars (2, 8–11)
- Dann Huff – electric guitars (2, 8–11)
- Brent Rowan – electric guitars (2, 8–11)
- Biff Watson – acoustic guitars (2, 8–11)
- Dan Dugmore – steel guitar (1, 3–7)
- Sonny Garrish – steel guitar (1, 3–7)
- Paul Franklin – steel guitar (2, 8–11)
- Glenn Worf – bass guitar (1, 3–7)
- Joe Chemay – bass guitar (2, 8–11)
- Lonnie Wilson – drums (1, 3–7)
- Paul Leim – drums (2, 8–11)
- Terry McMillan – percussion (1, 3–7)
- Tom Roady – percussion
- Aubrey Haynie – fiddle (1, 3–7)
- Larry Franklin – fiddle (2, 8–11)
- D. Vincent Williams – backing vocals (1, 3–7)
- Curtis Wright – backing vocals (1, 3–7)
- Curtis Young – backing vocals (1, 3–7)
- Mike Jones – backing vocals (2, 8–11)
- Patty Loveless – backing vocals (2, 8–11)
- Blue Miller – backing vocals (2, 8–11)
- Wendell Mobley – backing vocals (2, 8–11)
- Doug Virden – backing vocals (2, 8–11)
- Drew Womack – backing vocals (2, 8–11)

=== Production ===
- Byron Gallimore – producer (1, 3–7)
- Doug Johnson -producer (2, 8–11)
- Ann Callis – production assistant (1, 3–7)
- Eric Gallimore – project assistant (1, 3–7)
- Missi Gallimore – song assistant (1, 3–7)
- Paige Connors – production coordinator (2, 8–11)
- Bill Johnson – art direction
- Beth Kindig – art direction
- Bret Lopez – photography
- Mitzi Spallas – grooming
- Mimi DeBlasio – wardrobe stylist
- Dana Miller Management – management

Technical credits

- Georgetown Masters (Nashville, Tennessee) – editing and mastering location
- Denny Purcell – mastering
- Jonathan Russell – mastering assistant
- Don Cobb – digital editing
- Carlos Grier – digital editing
- Steve Marcantonio – mixing (1, 3–7)
- Ed Seay – track recording (2, 8–11), mixing (2, 8–11)
- James Arledge – recording assistant (1, 3–7)
- Marty Williams – recording assistant (1, 3–7)
- Scott Ahaus – recording assistant (2, 8–11)
- Dean Jamison – recording assistant (2, 8–11), mix assistant (2, 8–11)
- Dennis Davis – overdub assistant (1, 3–7)
- Kindy Girdley – overdub assistant (1, 3–7)
- Julian King – overdub assistant (1, 3–7)
- Erik Lutkins – overdub assistant (1, 3–7)
- Shawn Simpson – overdub assistant (1, 3–7), additional mix assistant (1, 3–7)
- Mark Capps – overdub assistant (2, 8–11)
- Todd Culross – overdub assistant (2, 8–11)
- Tony Green – overdub assistant (2, 8–11)
- Jason Piske – overdub assistant (2, 8–11)
- Aaron Swihart – overdub assistant (2, 8–11)
- Tim Waters – mix assistant (1, 3–7)
- John Guess – additional mixing (1, 3–7)
- Paul Worley – additional recording (2, 8–11), additional mixing (2, 8–11)
- Jim Burnett – additional engineer (2, 8–11)
- Tommy Cooper – additional recording assistant (2, 8–11)

== Chart performance ==
=== Weekly charts ===
Chart (1998)	Peak position
Canadian Country Albums (RPM)	31
US Billboard 200	140
US Top Country Albums (Billboard)	22

=== Year-end charts ===
Chart (1998)	Position
US Top Country Albums (Billboard)	74
