= What Matters Most =

What Matters Most may refer to:

- What Matters Most (Barbra Streisand album), released in 2011
- What Matters Most (Ben Folds album), released in 2023
- What Matters Most..., Forever Came Calling album released in 2014
- What Matters the Most, Shannon Noll album released in 2009

== See also ==
- Meaning of life
- What Mattered Most, 1995 Ty Herndon album
  - "What Mattered Most" (song), title track from the album
