= Hopechest =

Studio album by Stephanie Bentley
- Released: January 9, 1996
- Genre: Country
- Length: 38:35
- Label: Epic
- Producer: Todd Wilkes and Paul Worley; "Heart Half Empty" produced by Doug Johnson and Ed Seay

Hopechest is the only studio album by American country music artist Stephanie Bentley. It was released on January 9, 1996 via Epic Records Nashville and it accounted for four singles, in addition to reprising a single from Ty Herndon's debut album What Mattered Most on which Bentley provided duet vocals. The album reached a peak of 60 on the U.S. Billboard Top Country Albums charts.

== Content ==
Before the release of this album, Bentley had charted as a duet vocalist on Ty Herndon's 1996 single "Heart Half Empty", the third single from his debut album What Mattered Most, issued on Epic Records. After this single (which is also included on Hopechest) was Bentley's first solo release, "Who's That Girl". This song, her only solo Top 40 country hit, peaked at number 32 on the Billboard country charts. Following it were "Once I Was the Light of Your Life" at number 60, "The Hopechest Song" at number 47, and finally "Dead Ringer", which failed to chart. The album was produced by Paul Worley and Todd Wilkes, except for "Heart Half Empty", which Ed Seay and Doug Johnson produced. "Half the Moon" was previously recorded by Tanya Tucker on her 1992 album Can't Run from Yourself.

== Critical reception ==
Hopechest received a B+ rating from Entertainment Weekly critic Alanna Nash. She thought that Bentley did not have a distinctive voice but still "delivered with smarts and sass". Nash also called the song selection "nearly faultless." Chet Flippo of Billboard gave the album a positive review, saying that Bentley "has a big, controlled voice, solid writing chops, and an ear for a good song".

== Track listing ==
No.	Title	Writer(s)	Length
1.	"I'm Listening"	Matraca Berg, Ronnie Samoset	2:54
2.	"Who's That Girl"	Stephanie Bentley, Don Pfrimmer, George Teren	3:04
3.	"Once I Was the Light of Your Life"	Hugh Prestwood	3:40
4.	"What's Wrong With You (Is You Ain't Got Me)"	Kevin Welch, Wally Wilson	2:38
5.	"Half the Moon"	Prestwood	3:05
6.	"Permanent Hurt"	John Hiatt	3:25
7.	"The Hopechest Song"	Angela Kaset	4:11
8.	"If Promises Were Gold"	Shawna Harrington-Burkhart, Karl Hasten	3:24
9.	"Dead Ringer"	Todd Cerney, Stewart Harris	4:00
10.	"Heart Half Empty" (duet with Ty Herndon)	Gary Burr, Desmond Child	4:55
11.	"Think of Me"	Bentley, Richard "Spady" Brannan	3:19

== Personnel ==
- Stephanie Bentley - lead vocals
- Bruce Bouton - steel guitar
- Gerald Boyd - acoustic guitar
- Spady Brannan - bass guitar
- Steve Brewster - drums, percussion
- Mike Cass - steel guitar
- Joe Chemay - bass guitar
- Dan Dugmore - steel guitar
- Rob Hajacos - fiddle
- Tony Harrell - piano, keyboards
- Dann Huff - electric guitar
- Chris Leuzinger - electric guitar
- Carl Marsh - string section
- Steve Nathan - keyboards
- Bobby Ogdin - piano, keyboards
- Russ Pahl - acoustic guitar
- Billy Panda - electric guitar
- Robert Patin - piano, keyboards
- Brent Rowan - electric guitar
- Michael Severs - electric guitar
- Eric Silver - mandolin, fiddle
- Michael Spriggs - acoustic guitar
- Billy Joe Walker Jr. - acoustic guitar
- Biff Watson - acoustic guitar
- Lonnie Wilson - drums, percussion
- Paul Worley - acoustic guitar

== Chart performance ==
Chart (1997)	Peak position
U.S. Billboard Top Country Albums	60
