= What Mattered Most =

Studio album by Ty Herndon
- Released: April 18, 1995
- Recorded: 1994
- Studios: The Money Pit, Emerald Sound Studios, Quad Studios, Sound Stage Studios and JTM Studios (Nashville, Tennessee); The Castle (Franklin, Tennessee)
- Genre: Country
- Length: 35:18
- Label: Epic
- Producers: Doug Johnson; Ed Seay

Ty Herndon chronology
What Mattered Most (1995)	Living in a Moment (1996)

Singles from What Mattered Most
- 1. "What Mattered Most" Released: February 6, 1995; 2. "I Want My Goodbye Back" Released: June 5, 1995; 3. "Heart Half Empty" Released: October 14, 1995; 4. "In Your Face" Released: 1996

What Mattered Most is the debut studio album by American country music artist Ty Herndon, issued in 1995 on Epic Records. The album's title track, which was Herndon's debut single, reached No. 1 on the Billboard Hot Country Singles & Tracks (now Hot Country Songs) charts in mid-1995. Other singles from the album were, in order, "I Want My Goodbye Back," "Heart Half Empty" (a duet with Stephanie Bentley) and "In Your Face." Doug Johnson produced the entire album, with additional production from Ed Seay on "Heart Half Empty".

== Content ==
What Mattered Most was released on April 18, 1995, via Epic Records Nashville. The album is led off by its title track, which is also the first single from it. Written by Gary Burr and Vince Melamed, this song became Herndon's first No. 1 country hit in May 1995, peaking on both the U.S. Billboard Country Singles charts and Canadian RPM Country Singles charts. Following it were "I Want My Goodbye Back," "Heart Half Empty" (another Gary Burr co-write), and "In Your Face." Respectively, these reached 7, 21, and 63 on the U.S. Country charts. "Heart Half Empty," a duet with Stephanie Bentley, was her first chart single. It was reprised on her 1996 debut album Hopechest, also on Epic Records.

"You Just Get One" was later released as a single by Jeff Wood from his 1997 debut album Between the Earth and the Stars. Additionally, "Summer Was a Bummer" was later recorded by Wade Hayes on his 1998 album When the Wrong One Loves You Right, and "You Don't Mess Around with Jim" is a cover of the Jim Croce song from 1972.

What Mattered Most debuted at number 15 on Top Country Albums and #1 on Top Heatseekers, the highest album debut for a country artist since Billy Ray Cyrus' Some Gave All in 1992. It peaked at number 9 on the former chart. In addition, the album had the highest first-day shipment in the history of Epic Records' Nashville division.

== Critical reception ==
Giving it 3.5 stars out of 5, Michael McCall of New Country wrote that "For the most part, Herndon comes on like a confident newcomer worthy of attention." He praised the title track, "Pretty Good Thing", "Hat Full of Rain", and "I Want My Goodbye Back" for Herndon's vocal delivery, but criticized the same on the "You Don't Mess Around with Jim" cover. He also panned "Heart Half Empty", "You Just Get One", and "In Your Face" for their "unduly shallow" lyrics. An uncredited review in Billboard was favorable, saying that "With a rich, expressive voice that is equally suited to pensive ballads and rollicking, uptempo tunes, Herndon is one of country's most impressive newcomers."

== Track listing ==
No.	Title	Writer(s)	Length
1.	"What Mattered Most"	Gary Burr, Vince Melamed	3:40
2.	"Pretty Good Thing"	Walt Aldridge, Brad Crisler	2:51
3.	"Summer Was a Bummer"	Hank Cochran, Dean Dillon	3:30
4.	"You Don't Mess Around with Jim"	Jim Croce	3:16
5.	"Heart Half Empty" (duet with Stephanie Bentley)	Burr, Desmond Child	4:55
6.	"I Want My Goodbye Back"	Pat Bunch, Doug Johnson, Dave Berg	3:24
7.	"You Just Get One"	Vince Gill, Don Schlitz	3:35
8.	"In Your Face"	Annette Cotter, Kim Tribble	2:16
9.	"Love at 90 Miles an Hour"	Chris Knight, Sam Tate, Annie Tate	3:30
10.	"Hat Full of Rain"	Kim Morrison, Ronnie Godfrey	4:11

== Personnel ==
- Ty Herndon – vocals
- Steve Nathan – keyboards
- Kraig Hutchens – electric guitars (1, 7)
- Brent Rowan – electric guitars, gut-string guitar (3)
- Biff Watson – acoustic guitars
- Dann Huff – electric guitars (5)
- Dan Dugmore – steel guitar
- Paul Franklin – dobro (1, 9), steel guitar (2), lap steel guitar (4), steel guitar solo (8)
- Joe Chemay – bass guitar
- Paul Leim – drums (1, 5–7, 9)
- Lonnie Wilson – drums (2–4, 8, 10)
- Terry McMillan – percussion (1, 2, 4, 8, 9)
- Rob Hajacos – fiddle (1–6, 8, 9)
- Gary Burr – harmony vocals (1)
- Mike Jones – harmony vocals (1, 9)
- Blue Miller – harmony vocals (2)
- Ron Wallace – harmony vocals (2, 4, 6, 8)
- Joe Diffie – harmony vocals (3, 10)
- Carol Chase – harmony vocals (4)
- Stephanie Bentley – vocals (5), harmony vocals (9)
- Vince Gill – harmony vocals (7)
- Patty Loveless – harmony vocals (10)

String section on "Hat Full of Rain"

- Emory Gordy Jr. – string arrangements
- John Catchings – strings
- David Davidson – strings
- Conni Ellisor – strings
- Jim Grosjean – strings
- Connie Heard – strings
- Kathryn Plumber – strings
- Christian Teal – strings
- Kristin Wilkinson – strings

=== Production ===
- Doug Johnson – producer
- Ed Seay – co-producer (5), recording, mixing
- Jim Burnett – assistant engineer, digital editing
- Anthony Martin – assistant engineer
- Don Cobb – digital editing assistant
- Denny Purcell – mastering at Georgetown Masters (Nashville, Tennessee)
- Paige Connors – production assistant
- Bill Johnson – art direction
- Rollow Welch – art direction
- Frank Ockenfels 3 – photography
- Eddie Blount for Image Management – management

== Production ==
- Jim Burnett - digital editing, assistant engineer
- Don Cobb - editing
- Paige Conners - production assistant
- Emory Gordy, Jr. - string arrangement (track 10)
- Bill Johnson - art direction
- Doug Johnson - production (all tracks)
- Anthony Martin - assistant engineer
- Frank Ockenfels - photography
- Denny Purcell - mastering
- Ed Seay - production (track 5 only), engineering, mixing
- Rollow Welch - art direction

== Charts ==
=== Weekly charts ===
Chart (1995)	Peak position
Canadian Country Albums (RPM)	6
US Billboard 200	68
US Top Country Albums (Billboard)	9
US Heatseekers Albums (Billboard)	1

=== Year-end charts ===
Chart (1995)	Position
US Top Country Albums (Billboard)	63
