= Living in a Moment =

Studio album by Ty Herndon
- Released: August 13, 1996
- Studio: The Money Pit, Javelina Studios, The Music Mill, Recording Arts and Sound Stage Studios (Nashville, Tennessee)
- Genre: Country
- Length: 37:54
- Label: Epic
- Producer: Doug Johnson

Ty Herndon chronology
What Mattered Most (1995)	Living in a Moment (1996)	Big Hopes (1998)

Singles from Living in a Moment
- 1. "Living in a Moment" Released: June 17, 1996; 2. "She Wants to Be Wanted Again" Released: November 2, 1996; 3. "Loved Too Much" Released: March 10, 1997; 4. "I Have to Surrender" Released: September 20, 1997

Professional ratings
Review scores
Source	Rating
Allmusic	link
Entertainment Weekly	C+ link

Living in a Moment is the second studio album by American country music artist Ty Herndon. The album was released in 1996 (see 1996 in country music) via Epic Records. Like his debut album What Mattered Most, the album has been certified gold by the RIAA. It features the singles "Living in a Moment", "She Wants to Be Wanted Again", "Loved Too Much" and "I Have to Surrender".

The video for Living in a Moment was filmed at Sunset Station in San Antonio, Texas. The depot was owned by VIA Metropolitan Transit and was, at the time, a stopping point for Amtrak.

== Content ==
Living in a Moment is led off by its title track, which is also the first single release from it. This song became Herndon's second Number One hit on the Billboard country singles charts in 1996. Following this song were the #21 "She Wants to Be Wanted Again", the #2 "Loved Too Much" and the #17 "I Have to Surrender".

Four of this album's songs have also been recorded by other artists. "She Wants to Be Wanted Again" was originally recorded by Larry Stewart on his 1994 album Heart Like a Hurricane, and later by Western Flyer on their 1996 album Back in America. "I Know How the River Feels" was later released in 1999 as a single by Diamond Rio from their 1998 album Unbelievable, and again by McAlyster in 2000. In addition, Gary Allan recorded "Don't Tell Mama" on his 1999 album Smoke Rings in the Dark, as did Doug Stone on his 2007 album My Turn. Stone's version was a single in 2008. Kevin Sharp recorded "Her Heart Is Only Human" on his 1998 album Love Is. Frankie Ballard recorded and under the title "Don't Tell Mama I Was Drinking" on his 2014 album Sunshine & Whiskey.

Doug Virden and Drew Womack, members of the band Sons of the Desert at the time, provided background vocals on this album, as did Blue Miller, formerly of the Silver Bullet Band and Gibson/Miller Band. Both the Gibson/Miller Band and Sons of the Desert recorded for Epic as well.

== Track listing ==
No.	Title	Writer(s)	Length
1.	"Living in a Moment"	Pat Bunch, Doug Johnson	3:52
2.	"Returning the Faith""	Sam Lorber, Thom Hardwell	4:09
3.	"She Wants to Be Wanted Again"	Steven Dale Jones, Billy Henderson	3:54
4.	"Before There Was You"	Tommy Conners, Terry Brown	3:13
5.	"Don't Tell Mama"	Jerry Laseter, Buddy Brock, Kim Williams	4:12
6.	"Loved Too Much"	Don Schlitz, Billy Livsey	3:41
7.	"Her Heart Is Only Human"	Kent Blazy, Steve Dorff, Williams	3:35
8.	"Love Don't Work That Way"	Tony Haselden, Stan Munsey, Shane Sutton	3:26
9.	"I Have to Surrender"	Bunch, Johnson	3:25
10.	"I Know How the River Feels"	Jones, Amy Powers	4:25

== Personnel ==
- Ty Herndon – lead vocals
- Steve Nathan – keyboards
- Dann Huff – electric guitars
- Brent Rowan – electric guitars
- Biff Watson – acoustic guitars, mandolin
- John Willis – acoustic guitars
- Bruce Bouton – steel guitar, lap steel guitar
- Joe Chemay – bass guitar
- Paul Leim – drums
- Tom Roady – percussion
- Larry Franklin – fiddle
- Stephanie Bentley – backing vocals
- Mike Jones – backing vocals
- Liana Manis – backing vocals
- Blue Miller – backing vocals
- Jonell Mosser – backing vocals
- John Wesley Ryles – backing vocals
- Doug Virden – backing vocals
- Drew Womack – backing vocals

=== Production ===
- Doug Johnson – producer, overdub recording
- Ed Seay – track recording (1–5, 7–10)
- Tommy Cooper – recording (6)
- Anthony Martin – recording assistant (1–5, 7–10), additional engineer
- Erik Hellerman – recording assistant (6)
- Jim Burnett – additional assistant engineer
- Tony Castle – additional assistant engineer
- Robert Charles – additional assistant engineer
- Al Grassmick – additional assistant engineer
- Mel Jones – additional assistant engineer
- Graham Lewis – additional assistant engineer
- Mark Ralston – additional assistant engineer
- Jeff Wills – additional assistant engineer
- Kevin Beamish – mixing
- Mark Hagen – mix assistant
- Don Cobb – digital editing
- Denny Purcell – mastering at Georgetown Masters (Nashville, Tennessee)
- Paige Connors – production coordinator
- Bill Johnson – art direction
- Jodi Lynn Miller – art direction
- Matthew Barnes – photography
- Image Management – management

== Chart performance ==
Chart (1996)	Peak position
U.S. Billboard Top Country Albums	6
U.S. Billboard 200	65
Canadian RPM Country Albums	18
