= Heather's Wall =

Single by Ty Herndon
- Released: December 3, 2001
- Genre: Country
- Length: 3:23
- Label: Epic
- Songwriter(s): Rick Giles; Tim Nichols; Gilles Goddard
- Producer(s): Biff Watson; Paul Worley

Ty Herndon singles chronology
"A Love Like That" (2000)	"Heather's Wall" (2001)	"A Few Short Years" (2002)

"Heather's Wall" is a song written by Rick Giles, Tim Nichols, and Gilles Goddard, and recorded by American country music singer Ty Herndon. The song was slated to appear on his fifth studio album for Epic Records, which was never released due to the single's underperformance. The song peaked at number 37 on the US Hot Country Songs chart.

== Content ==
The song is about a man who walks in on a bank robbery and is fatally wounded in the process, unable to think of anything other than his love, who is named Heather.

Giles Goddard said that co-writer Tim Nichols had the title "Heather's Wall" for several years, but he and the other co-writers were unsure of what to do with the title until Rick Giles saw a bank robbery on television.

== Critical reception ==
Deborah Evans Price of Billboard reviewed the song with favor, saying that the song was "well-written" and that Herndon "delivers a powerful performance", although she added that "in a national climate where people are yearning for comfort and peace, this may have a challenge at the starting gate."

== Music video ==
The song's music video features Donna Scott, who also starred in Herndon's videos for "Living in a Moment", "I Have to Surrender" and "Hands of a Working Man", portraying Heather.

== Charts ==
Chart (2001–2002)	Peak position
US Hot Country Songs (Billboard)	37
