= Between the Earth and the Stars (Jeff Wood album) =

Studio album by Jeff Wood
- Released: February 11, 1997
- Genre: Country
- Length: 36:12
- Label: Imprint
- Producer: Mark Bright; Kevin Beamish

Jeff Wood chronology
Between the Earth and the Stars (1997)	Raw Wood (2008)

Between the Earth and the Stars is the debut album of American country music singer Jeff Wood. It was released on February 11, 1997, through Imprint Records. The album includes the singles "You Just Get One", "Use Mine" and "You Call That a Mountain".

== Content ==
"You Just Get One" was originally recorded by Ty Herndon on his 1995 debut What Mattered Most, and B. J. Thomas later released his version of "You Call That a Mountain" in 2000 from his album of the same name. Billy Hoffman also recorded the song on his 2000 album All I Wanted Was You. Bonnie Tyler covered the title track on her 2019 album of the same name.

== Critical reception ==
Jeffrey B. Remz of Country Standard Time described the album as "pleasant enough sounding" and "usually maintain[ing] country sensibilities" although Remz said that it "produce[d] no surprises". Allmusic critic Jack Leaver, who gave the album two-and-a-half stars out of five, called it "a mostly mellow set[…]that should appeal to the fans of the Dave Loggins-meets-John Berry school of country pop." The San Antonio Express-News called it an "impressive debut".

== Track listing ==
1. "You Call That a Mountain" (Michael Garvin, Bucky Jones) - 3:26
2. "Too Late to Turn It Around" (Jeff Wood, John Scott Sherrill, Simon Wilson) - 3:52
3. "There's No Place Like You" (Wood, Vernon Rust) - 4:11
4. "Long Way from OK" (Wood, Gary Burr, Pat McDonald) - 3:32
5. "Time to Move On" (Monty Powell, Eric Silver) - 3:28
6. "You Just Get One" (Don Schlitz, Vince Gill) - 2:58
7. "Sure Thing" (Wood, Verlon Thompson) - 3:00
8. "I Want It All" (Wood, John Tirro) - 3:19
9. "Use Mine" (Lisa Drew, Steve Seskin) - 4:07
10. "Between the Earth and the Stars" (Richard Wold, John David) - 4:19

== Personnel ==
As listed in liner notes.

- Eddie Bayers - drums
- Michael Black - background vocals
- Bruce Bouton - steel guitar, Dobro
- Mark Casstevens - acoustic guitar, banjo
- Mike Chapman - bass guitar
- Marty Churchill - background vocals
- Larry Franklin - fiddle
- Vince Gill - mandolin, guitar solo (track 6)
- Nicole Hassman - background vocals
- Tim Hensley - background vocals
- John Hobbs - keyboards, strings
- Dann Huff - electric guitar, 12-string guitar, gut string guitar
- Paul Leim - percussion
- Greg Morrow - drums
- Steve Nathan - strings
- Don Potter - acoustic guitar
- John Wesley Ryles - background vocals
- Eric Silver - mandolin, banjo
- Billy Joe Walker Jr. - acoustic guitar
