= House on Fire =

House on Fire may refer to:

- House on Fire (film), a 1986 Japanese film
- House on Fire, an album by Ty Herndon, 2016
- House on Fire, an album by Hembree, 2019
- House on Fire, an EP by Mad Caddies, 2020
- "House on Fire" (Mimi Webb song), 2022
- "House on Fire" (Rise Against song), 2018
- "House on Fire", a song by the Boomtown Rats from V Deep, 1982
- "House on Fire", a song by Fitz and the Tantrums from More Than Just a Dream, 2013
- "House on Fire", a song by the Menzingers from After the Party, 2017
- "House on Fire", a song by Sia from This Is Acting, 2016

== See also ==
- A House on Fire, a 2024 Spanish-Italian comedy-drama film
