= Heart Half Empty =

Single by Ty Herndon with Stephanie Bentley

from the album What Mattered Most
- B-side: "Love at 90 Miles an Hour"
- Released: October 14, 1995
- Genre: Country
- Length: 4:56 (album version)
- Label: Epic
- Songwriters: Gary Burr, Desmond Child
- Producers: Doug Johnson, Ed Seay

Ty Herndon singles chronology
| "I Want My Goodbye Back" (1995) | "Heart Half Empty" (1995) | "In Your Face" (1996) |

Stephanie Bentley singles chronology
| "Heart Half Empty" (1995) | "Who's That Girl" (1996) |

"Heart Half Empty" is a song written by Gary Burr and Desmond Child, and recorded by American country music artists Ty Herndon and Stephanie Bentley. It was released in October 1995 as the third single from his debut album What Mattered Most. The song reached number 21 on the Billboard Hot Country Singles & Tracks chart. It later appeared on Bentley's debut album Hopechest, which like What Mattered Most was released on Epic Records.

== Content ==
The song is a ballad about two lovers who, in the emotion following a breakup, ask "Is my heart half full of the love you gave me / Or is my heart half empty, because your love is gone?"

== Chart performance ==
| Chart (1995–1996) | Peak position |
|---|---|
| Canada Country Singles (RPM) | 12 |
| US Hot Country Songs (Billboard) | 21 |
