= She Wants to Be Wanted Again =

Single by Ty Herndon

from the album Living in a Moment
- B-side: "Before There Was You"
- Released: November 2, 1996
- Genre: Country
- Length: 3:54
- Label: Epic
- Songwriters: Billy Henderson, Steven Dale Jones
- Producer: Doug Johnson

Ty Herndon singles chronology
| "Living in a Moment" (1996) | "She Wants to Be Wanted Again" (1996) | "Loved Too Much" (1997) |

"She Wants to Be Wanted Again" is a song written by Billy Henderson and Steven Dale Jones. It was first recorded in 1992 by Lee Greenwood for his album Love's on the Way, then by Larry Stewart for his 1994 album Heart Like a Hurricane, and Western Flyer on their 1996 album Back in America.

It was later released as a single by American country music artist Ty Herndon. It was released in November 1996 as the second single from the album Living in a Moment. The song reached number 21 on the Billboard Hot Country Singles & Tracks chart.

== Chart performance ==
| Chart (1996–1997) | Peak position |
|---|---|
| Canada Country Singles (RPM) | 19 |
| US Hot Country Songs (Billboard) | 21 |
