= Cocker (album) =

Studio album by Joe Cocker
- Released: 18 April 1986
- Recorded: 1985
- Studio: Ardent Studios (Memphis, Tennessee); The Power Station (New York City, New York); Record Plant (Los Angeles, California); Oasis Recording Studios (Universal City, California); Criterion Studios and Ocean Way Recording (Hollywood, California); Abbey Road Studios, The Workhouse and AIR Studios (London, UK)
- Genre: Rock; Pop
- Length: 45:55
- Label: EMI
- Producer: Terry Manning; Ron Nevison; Albert Hammond and Diane Warren; Bernard Edwards; Richie Zito

Joe Cocker chronology
Civilized Man (1984)	Cocker (1986)	Unchain My Heart (1987)

Professional ratings
Review scores
Source	Rating
AllMusic	2/5 stars

Cocker is the tenth studio album by English singer Joe Cocker, released in April 1986, his second on Capitol label. It features hit singles "You Can Leave Your Hat On" and "Don't You Love Me Anymore", the former made popular after its use in the famous striptease scene in the film 9½ Weeks. Released as a single, Cocker's version of the song peaked at No. 35 on Billboard Hot Mainstream Rock Tracks. The album also features rendition of Marvin Gaye's "Inner City Blues", a Motown legend's classic lament to urban decay.

The album is dedicated to Joe Cocker's mother, Marjorie (Madge) Cocker, who died during the time period of the recording sessions.

== Composition ==
Where Civilized Man, Cocker's previous album, had two producers, Cocker had five. Also, the recording sessions took place in several studios in London, Memphis, Los Angeles and New York. The reason for this was Capitol trying out on Joe Cocker a formula that had brought success for Tina Turner. The album also featured, for the first time since 1976's Stingray, Cocker's touring band, who played on five tracks.

The release of Cocker was preceded by a single "Shelter Me", a powerful opener from the album, featuring rousing performances from guitarist Cliff Goodwin and saxophonist Mel Collins.

== Track listing ==
1. "Shelter Me" (Nick DiStefano) – 5:36
2. "A to Z" (Tom Kimmel) – 4:21
3. "Don't You Love Me Anymore" (Albert Hammond, Diane Warren) – 5:25
4. "Living Without Your Love" (Michael Bolton, Doug James) – 4:09
5. "Don't Drink The Water" (Richard Feldman, Pat Robinson) – 3:25
6. "You Can Leave Your Hat On" (Randy Newman) – 4:14
7. "Heart of the Matter" (Ronald Miller, Billy Aerts) – 4:20
8. "Inner City Blues" (Marvin Gaye, James Nyx Jr.) – 5:51
9. "Love Is on a Fade" (Stephen Allen Davis, Dennis Morgan) – 4:04
10. "Heaven" (Terry Manning) – 4:32

Sessions outtake

1. "Tell Me There's A Way" (Roy Freeland, Beppe Cantarelli) – 4:04

== Personnel ==
- Joe Cocker – lead vocals
- Larry Marshall – keyboards (1, 2), synthesizers (8–10), organ (10)
- Carl Marsh – Fairlight programming (1, 2, 8–10), Fairlight CMI (2)
- Howie Hersh – keyboards (2), acoustic piano (8–10)
- Jeff Lorber – keyboards (3)
- Michael Moran – keyboards (4), bass (4, 7)
- Jeff Bova – keyboards (5)
- Arthur Barrow – keyboards (6), bass (6)
- Michael Boddicker – keyboards (7)
- Cliff Goodwin – guitars (1, 2, 5, 7–10)
- Neal Schon – guitars (3)
- Dann Huff – guitars (4), additional guitars (7)
- Eddie Martinez – guitars (5)
- Richie Zito – guitars (6)
- Vito Sanfilippo – bass (1, 2, 8–10)
- Randy Jackson – bass (3)
- Bernard Edwards – bass (5)
- Eric Parker – drums (1, 2, 4, 7–10)
- Anton Fig – drums (5)
- Mike Baird – drums (6)
- Mel Collins – Selmer Mark VI saxophone (1, 2, 8)
- Joel Peskin – saxophones (6)
- Andrew Love – saxophone (10)
- Dick Hyde – trombone (6)
- Steve Madaio – trumpet (6)
- Bob Ezrin – arrangements (3)
- Maxine Green – backing vocals (2, 4–7, 9, 10)
- Elesecia Wright – backing vocals (2, 4, 5, 7, 9, 10)
- Albert Hammond – backing vocals (3)
- Leslie Smith – backing vocals (3)
- Joe Turano – backing vocals (3)
- Diane Warren – backing vocals (3)
- Curtis King – backing vocals (5)
- Julia Tillman Waters – backing vocals (6)
- Maxine Waters Willard – backing vocals (6)

== Production ==
- Terry Manning – producer (1, 2, 8–10), and "Tell Me There's a Way"
- Albert Hammond – producer (3)
- Diane Warren – producer (3)
- Ron Nevison – producer (4, 7)
- Bernard Edwards – producer (5)
- Richie Zito – producer (6)
- Roy Kohara – art direction
- Peter Shea – design
- Peter Ashworth – photography
- Color Special Effects – cover photo enhancement
- Michael Lang for Better Music, Inc. – management

Technical credits

- Terry Manning – engineer (1, 2, 8–10), mixing (1, 2, 8–10)
- Guy Roche – engineer (3)
- Bob Ezrin – mixing (3)
- Paul Lani – mixing (3)
- Ron Nevison – engineer (4, 7)
- Josh Abbey – engineer (5)
- Jason Corsaro – engineer (5)
- Brian Reeves – engineer (6)
- Stuart Barry – assistant engineer (1, 2, 8–10)
- Kim Jenkins – assistant engineer (1, 2, 8–10)
- Paul Mortimer – assistant engineer (1, 2, 8–10)
- Patrick Stanley – assistant engineer (1, 2, 8–10)
- Mike Clink – assistant engineer (4, 7)
- Matt Howe – assistant engineer (4, 7)
- Jon Goldberger – assistant engineer (5)

== Chart performance ==
Chart (1986)	Peak position
Swiss Albums Chart	3
German Albums Chart	4
Norway Albums Chart	5
Australian Kent Music Report	9
Austrian Albums Chart	15
Dutch Albums Chart	20
Swedish Albums Chart	20
New Zealand Albums Chart	48
US Billboard 200	50
Canadian Albums Chart	75

== Certifications ==
Region	Certification	Certified units/sales
Australia (ARIA)	Platinum	70,000^{^}
Germany (BVMI)	Platinum	500,000^{^}
Switzerland (IFPI Switzerland)	Gold	25,000^{^}
^{^} Shipments figures based on certification alone.
