= Jeff Wood (singer) =

American singer-songwriter

Jeff Scott Wood
- Born: Jeffrey Scott Wood; May 10, 1968 (age 58)
- Origin: Oklahoma City, Oklahoma, United States
- Genres: Country
- Occupation: Singer-songwriter
- Instruments: Vocals, keyboards, bass guitar
- Years active: 1994–present
- Labels: Liberty, Imprint
- Website: JeffScottWood.com

Jeffrey Scott Wood (born May 10, 1968) is an American country music artist. Wood was signed to a publishing contract in 1994, writing songs for other country artists, including "Cowboy Love", a Top 5 hit for John Michael Montgomery in 1996. He signed to a recording contract with Liberty Records later that year, but did not release anything while on the label. His debut album, Between the Earth and the Stars, was released in 1997 on Imprint Records. This album produced three chart singles for Wood on the Hot Country Songs charts that year, including the No. 44-peaking "You Just Get One". Although he did not chart again after 1997, Wood continued to write songs for other artists into the 2000s, including Neal McCoy and Phil Vassar, and independently released a second album in 2008.

== Biography ==
Wood was born May 10, 1968, in Oklahoma City, Oklahoma. He later attended Oklahoma State University, where he earned a degree in finance and was a member of the Sigma Nu fraternity. One of Wood's classmates was Garth Brooks, who, like Wood, had aspirations to become a country music artist. Eventually, both singers moved to Nashville, Tennessee to begin their respective careers.

Wood was signed to a songwriting contract with EMI Publishing in 1994. One of his first cuts as a songwriter was "Cowboy Love," which was a top five hit on the country charts for John Michael Montgomery in early 1996. Liberty Records signed Wood to a recording contract later that year, although he did not release anything for the label.

By the end of the year, he had signed to his second recording contract, this time with a newly started independent label, Imprint Records. His debut album, Between the Earth and the Stars, was released on February 11, 1997, under the production of Mark Bright. The album's lead-off single, "You Just Get One", reached number 44 on the Billboard Hot Country Singles & Tracks (now Hot Country Songs) charts. This song was co-written by Don Schlitz and Vince Gill (who also played mandolin and guitar on the album), and was previously cut by Ty Herndon on his 1995 debut album What Mattered Most. Wood's rendition of the song featured Gill performing on guitar and mandolin. Brett Atwood of Billboard called "You Just Get One" an "immensely likeable" single. Between the Earth and the Stars also produced minor chart singles in the number 55 "Use Mine" and number 63 "You Call That a Mountain", which was later a single in 2000 for B.J. Thomas from his album of the same name. Imprint closed at the end of 1997, and Wood was left without a record label. He continued to write songs for other artists, including Tracy Byrd, Neal McCoy, and Phil Vassar.

Wood was formerly the brother-in-law of Phil Vassar from 2003 to 2007. Vassar was married to Wood's sister, Julie.

In 2008, Wood returned to recording, issuing an album entitled Raw Wood independently. Its first single is a song entitled "Long Way from OK", a re-recording of a song previously found on his debut album. Wood also released a Christmas album and a religious-themed album.

Jeff Wood was nominated for the 7th Annual Independent Music Awards for Band Venue Poster of the year.

In 2013, Wood issued his third country album entitled "The Jeff Scott Wood Project, Nothin' But Blue" independently, JeffScottWood.com.

== Discography ==
=== Albums ===
Title	Album details
Between the Earth and the Stars	Release date: February 11, 1997; Label: Imprint Records; Format: CD, cassette
Raw Wood	Release date: 2008; Label: Self-released; Format: CD
The Jeff Scott Wood Project	Release date: May 10, 2013; Label: JeffScottWood.com; Format: CD

=== Singles ===
Year	Single	Peak chart positions		Album
Year	Single	US Country	CAN Country	Album
1997	"You Just Get One"	44	87	Between the Earth and the Stars
1997	"Use Mine"	55	—	Between the Earth and the Stars
1997	"You Call That a Mountain"	63	97	Between the Earth and the Stars
2008	"Long Way from OK"	—	—	Raw Wood
"—" denotes releases that did not chart

=== Music videos ===
Year	Video	Director
1997	"Use Mine"	Jim Shea
1997	"Fire Down Below" (with Aaron Tippin and Mark Collie)	Steven R. Monroe
2008	"Long Way from OK"	
