= I Want My Goodbye Back =

Single by Ty Herndon

from the album What Mattered Most
- Released: June 5, 1995
- Genre: Country
- Length: 3:24
- Label: Epic
- Songwriters: Pat Bunch; Doug Johnson; Dave Berg
- Producers: Doug Johnson; Ed Seay

Ty Herndon singles chronology
"What Mattered Most" (1995)	"I Want My Goodbye Back" (1995)	"Heart Half Empty" (1995)

"I Want My Goodbye Back" is a song written by Pat Bunch, Doug Johnson and Dave Berg, and recorded by American country music artist Ty Herndon. It was released in June 1995 as the second single from his debut album, What Mattered Most. The song reached number 7 on the Billboard Hot Country Singles & Tracks chart in September 1995.

== Critical reception ==
Michael McCall of New Country wrote that the song "displays his humor and energy".

== Personnel ==
From What Mattered Most liner notes.

- Joe Chemay - bass guitar
- Dan Dugmore - steel guitar
- Rob Hajacos - fiddle
- Paul Leim - drums
- Steve Nathan - keyboards
- Brent Rowan - electric guitar
- Ron Wallace - background vocals
- Biff Watson - acoustic guitar

== Music video ==
The music video was directed by Steven Goldmann and premiered in June 1995.

== Chart performance ==
"I Want My Goodbye Back" debuted at number 66 on the U.S. Billboard Hot Country Singles & Tracks for the week of June 10, 1995.

Chart (1995)	Peak position
Canada Country Singles (RPM)	9
US Hot Country Songs (Billboard)	7

=== Year-end charts ===
Chart (1995)	Position
US Country Songs (Billboard)	69
