= Steam (Ty Herndon album) =

Studio album by Ty Herndon
- Released: November 2, 1999
- Studio: Ocean Way Nashville (Nashville, Tennessee); Sound Kitchen (Franklin, Tennessee)
- Genre: Country
- Length: 39:21
- Label: Epic
- Producer: Joe Scaife

Ty Herndon chronology
Big Hopes (1998)	Steam (1999)	This Is Ty Herndon: Greatest Hits (2002)

Singles from Steam
- 1. "Steam" Released: August 23, 1999; 2. "No Mercy" Released: January 10, 2000; 3. "A Love Like That" Released: June 26, 2000

Professional ratings
Review scores
Source	Rating
Allmusic	link
Country Standard Time	Negative link

Steam is the fourth studio album by American country music artist Ty Herndon. It features the singles "Steam", "No Mercy", and "A Love Like That", all of which entered the Billboard country music charts; "You Can Leave Your Hat On" also entered the charts from unsolicited airplay. This album was less successful than its predecessors as far as the peak positions of its chart singles. The highest-peaking, which was the title track, reached number 18, while "No Mercy" peaked at number 26. "A Love Like That" peaked at number 58, becoming the second single of Herndon's career to miss the Top 40.

== Track listing ==
Steam track listing
No.	Title	Writer(s)	Length
1.	"Lookin' for the Good Life"	Mac McAnally	4:08
2.	"Steam"	Lewis Anderson; Bob Regan	3:37
3.	"Putting the Brakes on Time"	Jon McElroy; Ned McElroy	3:49
4.	"I Can't Do It All"	Chuck Jones; Tom Shapiro	3:11
5.	"No Mercy"	Todd Cerney; Dennis Morgan; Stephen Allen Davis	4:46
6.	"In a New York Second"	Greg Barnhill; Jim Daddario	4:42
7.	"That's What I Call Love"	Steve Dean; Danny Orton	3:25
8.	"Pray for Me"	Rob Crosby; Allen Shamblin	3:24
9.	"A Love Like That"	Marc Beeson; Don Pfrimmer	3:35
10.	"You Can Leave Your Hat On (By the Fans' Request)"	Randy Newman	4:39
Total length:			39:21

== Personnel ==
Compiled from liner notes.

Musicians and Vocals

- Ty Herndon – lead vocals
- John Hobbs – acoustic piano, organ, synthesizers
- Steve Nathan – synthesizers
- Chris Leuzinger – electric guitars
- Brent Rowan – electric guitars
- Biff Watson – acoustic guitars
- Dan Dugmore – steel guitar, dobro
- Glen Duncan – mandolin, fiddle
- Gary Lunn – bass guitar
- Paul Leim – drums, percussion
- Eric Darken – percussion
- Carl Gorodetzky – strings (8)
- Jim Grosjean – strings (8)
- Bob Mason – strings (8)
- Pamela Sixfin – strings (8)
- Tommy Cooper – string arrangements (8)
- Kirk "Jelly Roll" Johnson – harmonica (10)
- Jim Horn – saxophones (10)
- Chris McDonald – trombone (10)
- Mike Haynes – trumpet (10)
- Bob Bailey – backing vocals
- Joe Chemay – backing vocals
- Lisa Cochran – backing vocals
- Tabitha Fair – backing vocals
- Kim Fleming – backing vocals
- Vicki Hampton – backing vocals
- Anthony Martin – backing vocals
- Neil Thrasher – backing vocals
- Chris Willis – backing vocals

Production

- Anthony Martin – A&R producer
- Joe Scaife – producer
- Jim Cotton – associate producer, additional engineer
- Steve Marcantonio – recording, mixing
- Chris Davie – assistant engineer
- Greg Fogie – assistant engineer
- Melissa Mattey – assistant engineer
- J. C. Monterosa – assistant engineer
- Randy LeRoy – digital editing at Final Stage Mastering (Nashville, Tennessee)
- Hank Williams – mastering at MasterMix (Nashville, Tennessee)
- Leigh Brannon – production coordinator
- Tonya Derry –A&R coordinator
- Kay Smith – A&R coordinator
- Bill Johnson – art direction, design
- Rollow Welch – art direction, design
- Kyle Hempel – art assistance
- Russ Harrington – photography
- Dana Miller Management – management

== Charts ==
Chart (1999)	Peak position
US Top Country Albums (Billboard)	14
US Billboard 200	124
