= D. Vincent Williams =

American country music singer-songwriter (born 1969)

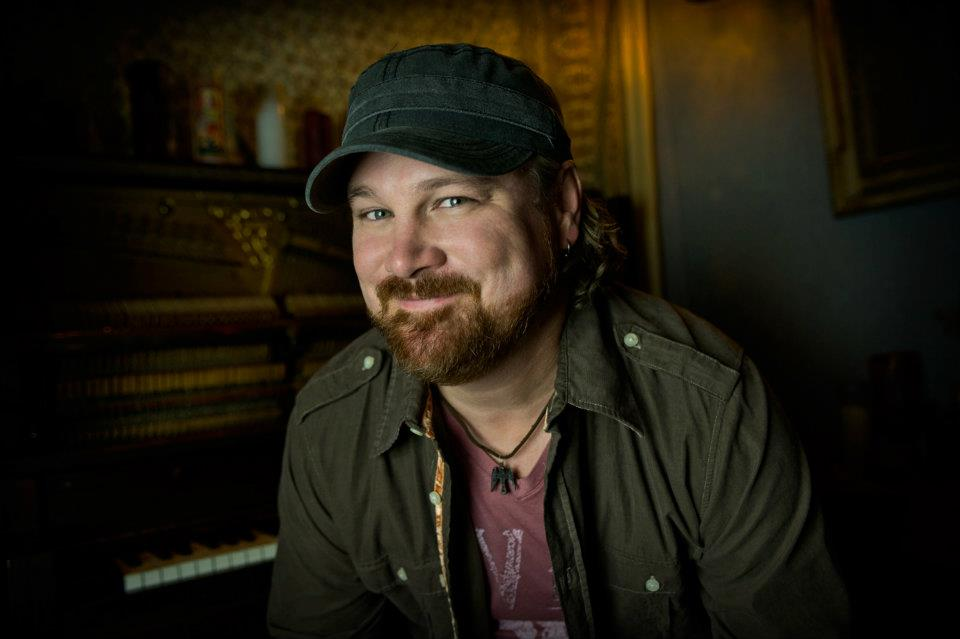
- D. Vincent Williams in 2013

Background information
- Born: David Vincent Williams; September 18, 1969 (age 56); Houston, Texas United States
- Genres: Country
- Occupation: Singer/songwriter
- Instruments: Vocals, guitar, bass guitar, piano
- Years active: 1990–present
- Labels: Columbia Records, Bigger Picture Music Group
- Website: dvincentwilliams.com

David Vincent Williams (born September 18, 1969 in Houston, Texas) is an American country music singer-songwriter. His songs have been recorded and released by major country recording artists, including "I’m Movin‘ On" by Rascal Flatts, Ty Herndon’s "Hands of a Working Man" and James Otto’s "Just Got Started Lovin' You." Williams is a BMI songwriter who has written over 550 songs.

== Early life ==
Williams lived in Houston until 1980 when his family moved east and settled in Lufkin, Texas. Following high school, Williams spent four years in neighboring Nacogdoches, Texas playing in several bands. One of the most popular bands, Fives a Crowd, was a rock cover band that gained a substantial following before splitting up in late 1992. At this time Williams made his first trip to Nashville, Tennessee and recorded his first studio recording session at Oak Hill Studios with Kevin McManus. A brief return to Nacogdoches saw Fives a Crowd reconstructed into a country band and Williams played with them before the band relocated to the Dallas/Fort Worth area.

== Songwriting and music career ==
Influenced strongly by songwriters in the country format like Kris Kristofferson, Dan Seals, Dean Dillon, Bob McDill, Steve Wariner and Hugh Prestwood, Williams left Dallas in 1994 and moved to Nashville full time. He landed a songwriting publishing deal with Warner/Chappell Music (Warner Tamerlane) within six months of his arrival.

Williams signed a recording contract with Columbia Records in 1995 through Scott Siman, who was then a Vice President of Sony Music Nashville, Columbia's parent company. During this time he wrote "Hands of a Working Man," which was slated to be Williams's first single on his Columbia Records debut. At the same time, country artist Ty Herndon recorded and released the song as a single, peaking at No. 5 on the Billboard Country Singles Chart. Williams also provided high harmony background vocals on the hit song.

After Williams and Columbia Records parted ways, he focused completely on his songwriting, subsequently seeing his songs recorded by many established recording artists, including Diamond Rio, Mark Wills, Neal McCoy, John Michael Montgomery, Keith Harling, Reba McEntire, Ronnie Milsap, Jason Aldean, Craig Morgan, Jimmy Wayne, Lee Ann Womack, Terri Clark, Michael Bolton, Emily West, Ricky Skaggs, John Berry, as well as his biggest musical influence, Steve Wariner.

Williams had his second major label radio single release as a songwriter in 2000 with “Oklahoma" by 12-year-old prodigy artist Billy Gilman. In 2001, a still relatively unknown trio called Rascal Flatts released "I’m Movin‘ On" which Williams co-wrote with Phillip White. The song would go on to hit No. 4 on the Billboard Country Singles Chart. The song also won the 2002 Academy of Country Music Song of the Year Award and came in at #15 on the 2002 Billboard Year-End Hot Country Songs Chart for 2002. Williams also won the Nashville Songwriters Association International (NSAI) "Song I Wish I Would Have Written" Award voted by hit songwriters across the nation for the song "I’m Movin’ On."

In 2004 Steve Holy released Williams's song "Put Your Best Dress On," which peaked at No. 26. Around this time Williams became part of a trio named “Sky” which had a development deal in the works with RCA Records with fellow musicians Dillon Dixon and Billy Austin.

In 2005, Randy Travis recorded and released "Four Walls" which aired on Extreme Makeover: Home Edition and in 2006 Kenny Rogers released "The Last Ten Years (Superman)," which Williams wrote with Tommy Conners. Later that year, a song entitled “Anywhere But Here” was recorded and released by both Chris Cagle (his album title track), and Brice Long.

In late 2005, after 14 years with Warner Chappell, Williams left and signed with Big Picture Music Publishing and in 2008 new artist James Otto and Williams collaborated with fellow songwriter Jim Femino to write "Just Got Started Lovin' You." The song peaked at No. 1 on the Billboard Hot Country Songs Chart as well as topping the 2008 Year-End Country Songs Chart, and was the most played song on country radio for 2008.

In 2007 Williams and wife Melinda Duncan created Black Ink Music Publishing.

In 2009 Williams signed once again with Big Picture Music Publishing, which was now in a co-publishing partnership with Warner/Chappell Music and soon after, he signed a recording contract with Bigger Picture Music Group. Williams and long time friend and award-winning producer Keith Stegall (Alan Jackson, Zac Brown Band) produced Williams's first official album "Down By The River" which charted at No. 53 with a 4½ out of 5 star rating by Taste of Country (subsidiary of Townsquare Media). Williams also co-produced four songs on Chris Cagle’s album "Back In The Saddle" with Keith Stegall.

In 2013 Williams left Bigger Picture and signed with Zac Brown’s Southern Ground Music Publishing, and in 2014 Williams signed with Blue Guitar Music Publishing where he currently serves as full-time staff writer and songwriting mentor.

== Charity work and Amuse Entertainment ==
Williams has been involved in charity work throughout his career, which led to the creation of Amuse Entertainment – a private corporate entertainment company that Williams founded in 2014.

== Personal life ==
Williams was previously married and has two daughters Haley and Hannah. He married Melinda Duncan in May 2007 at the Key West Songwriters Festival. He has two step-children.

== Discography ==
=== Singles ===
Year	Single	Peak positions
Year	Single	US Country
2012	"Down by the River"	53
