= Steam (Ty Herndon song) =

Single by Ty Herndon

from the album Steam
- B-side: "Lookin' for the Good Life"
- Released: August 9, 1999
- Genre: Country
- Length: 3:37
- Label: Epic
- Songwriters: Lewis Anderson; Bob Regan
- Producer: Joe Scaife

Ty Herndon singles chronology
"Hands of a Working Man" (1999)	"Steam" (1999)	"No Mercy" (2000)

"Steam" is a song recorded by American country music artist Ty Herndon, with lyrics written by Lewis Anderson and Bob Regan. It was released in August 1999 as the lead single and title track from his fourth studio album, Steam. The song reached number 18 on the Billboard Hot Country Singles & Tracks chart, and peaked at number 19 on the Canadian RPM Country Tracks chart as well as at number 83 on the Billboard Hot 100 chart. The song received positive reviews, with particular praise for its suggestive lyrics.

== Background ==
Herndon told Billboard that he originally had doubts about the song. "That is so not me, I'm so used to doing songs with a message to them. [Anthony Martin] told me, 'Well you're going to have to take a step back and make it you.'" He went on to call the song "one of those you put in your car CD player and let the windows down, it makes you feel alive and feel good. Sometimes you've got to just have a little fun."

== Critical reception ==
Maria Konicki Dinoia wrote for Allmusic that the song is part of a "feel-good music" album, and described its lyrics as suggestive. Dan MacIntosh from Country Standard Time highlighted the song along with Herndon's cover version of "You Can Leave Your Hat On", originally by Randy Newman. Craig Powers, program director of KIKF Los Angeles, described the song as "a sexy, provocative song [...] one that the audience goes nuts over". Deborah Evans Price of Billboard commented that the song is a "left-of-center top 10 anthem of sexuality" when she reviewed Herndon's single "No Mercy".

== Music video ==
The music video was directed by Steven Goldmann and premiered in mid-1999.

== Chart performance ==
"Steam" debuted at number 63 on the U.S. Billboard Hot Country Singles & Tracks chart for the week of August 21, 1999.

Chart (1999–2000)	Peak position
Canada Country Singles (RPM)	19
US Billboard Hot 100	83
US Hot Country Songs (Billboard)	18
