= Ron Wallace (singer) =

American singer-songwriter

- Born: Pompano Beach, Florida
- Genres: Country
- Occupation: Singer-songwriter
- Instrument: Guitar
- Years active: 1987–present
- Labels: Columbia Records
- Website: ronwallaceofficial.com

Ron Wallace was born in Pompano Beach, Florida and grew up in Kansas City, Missouri. He is an American country music singer-songwriter. He was signed to Sony/Columbia Records and a single of his was on the Billboard Hot Country Singles & Tracks chart. He released an EP, It Must Be Love, independently in late March 2015.

== Career ==
Wallace moved to Nashville in 1987, where he found work as a demo singer. He sang background vocals on Faith Hill's 1993 album Take Me as I Am and Ty Herndon's 1995 debut What Mattered Most. In 1994, Wallace signed to Columbia. His debut single, "I'm Listening Now", was released in August 1995. Deborah Evans Price of Billboard wrote that "Wallace has a strong voice and displays a rather moving interpretive ability." It peaked at number 65 on the Billboard Hot Country Singles & Tracks chart. Columbia Records released Wallace's album, Bound and Determined, on October 17, 1995. A second single, "Left Hand of God" came out a month later.

== Discography ==
=== Albums ===
| Title | Album details |
|---|---|
| Bound and Determined | Release date: October 17, 1995; Label: Columbia Records |
| It Must Be Love (EP) | Release date: March 2015; Label: Self-released |

=== Singles ===
| Year | Single | Peak positions | Album |
| Year | Single | US Country | Album |
|---|---|---|---|
| 1995 | "I'm Listening Now" | 65 | Bound and Determined |
| 1995 | "Left Hand of God" | — | Bound and Determined |
| 2015 | "It Must Be Love" | — | It Must Be Love (EP) |
"—" denotes releases that did not chart

=== Music videos ===
| Year | Video |
|---|---|
| 1995 | "I'm Listening Now" |
| 2015 | "It Must Be Love" |
