= Right About Now (Ty Herndon album) =

Studio album by Ty Herndon
- Released: January 9, 2007
- Studio: East Iris Studios (Nashville, Tennessee); Monster Island Recording (New York City, New York)
- Genre: Country
- Length: 42:42
- Label: Titan/Pyramid/Quarterback/Fontana
- Producer: Darrell Brown; Ty Herndon; Dennis Matkosky; Jonathan Yudkin

Ty Herndon chronology
This Is Ty Herndon: Greatest Hits (2002)	Right About Now (2007)	Journey On (2010)

Singles from Right About Now
- 1. "Right About Now" Released: September 25, 2006; 2. "Mighty Mighty Love" Released: May 14, 2007

Professional ratings
Review scores
Source	Rating
Allmusic	link

Right About Now is the sixth studio album by American country music Ty Herndon, released on January 9, 2007 primarily through Pyramid and Quarterback Records. It was produced by Herndon with Darrell Brown, Dennis Matkosky, and Jonathan Yudkin.

The album spawned two singles in the form of the title track and "Mighty Mighty Love", with the latter originally having been recorded by Michael Peterson from his 2004 album Modern Man and the latter originally recorded by Lila McCann on her final studio album Complete (2001). Both singles did not chart on the Billboard Hot Country Songs chart. "You Still Own Me" was a cover originally performed by Canadian musician Johnny Reid and later recorded by Emerson Drive, both of whom released it as a single. The album includes backing vocals from Joanna Cotten, Emily West, Marcus Hummon, and Thompson Square.

Right About Now peaked at number 41 on the US Top Country Albums chart.

== Critical reception ==
Thom Jurek of AllMusic gave the album a positive review, complimenting Herndon's vocals. He said, "Herndon re-enters the scene more talented and far more mature than he left it. It's time for Nashville – and the rest country music's faithful – to sit up, listen and take notice that a real master has returned."

Kevin John Coyne of Country Universe reviewed both singles from the album. In his review for the title cut, he gave the song a B+, saying "it's a solid song by a vocalist that never fully had the commercial success or consistency of material that his talents deserved." In an opposite turn he reviewed "Mighty Mighty Love" negatively, saying that the song is "so filled with cliches and lines heard a million times before that it's instantly forgettable;" he rated the song a C. Chuck Taylor of Billboard also gave "Right About Now" a positive review by saying, "Piano drives the melancholy double-entendre lyric while Herndon diverts between falsetto and his rich expressive tenor." He ended his review saying, "A confident, easygoing track that sounds as if there was never a blip in his career."

== Commercial performance ==
Right About Now debuted at number 41 on the US Top Country Albums chart the week of January 27, 2007, where it was the "Hot Shot Debut" of the week. The following week, it fell to number 48. It spent a third and final week on the chart at number 64.

The album debuted at number 24 on the Independent Albums chart also the week of January 27, 2007. It spent only one more week before falling off.

== Track listing ==
No.	Title	Writer(s)	Producer(s)	Length
1.	"Someday Soon"	Darrell Brown; Radney Foster; Keith Urban	Ty Herndon; Jonathan Yudkin	3:54
2.	"In the Arms of the One Who Loves Me"	Brown; Jess Cates; Arnie Roman	Herndon; Darrell Brown	4:01
3.	"You Still Own Me"	Phillip Douglas; Noah Gordon; Johnny Reid	Herndon; Yudkin	3:12
4.	"Mighty Mighty Love"	Brown; Tim Nichols; Dennis Matkosky	Herndon; Dennis Matkosky	3:53
5.	"Right About Now"	Brown; Michael Peterson	Herndon; Brown	3:15
6.	"Love Revival"	Marcus Hummon; John Mallory	Herndon; Yudkin	3:29
7.	"Hide"	Kevin Paige; Cates	Herndon; Yudkin	3:56
8.	"Mercy Line"	Brown; Greg Barnhill	Herndon; Yudkin	3:34
9.	"We Are"	Jim Rushing; Ryan Rushing	Herndon; Yudkin	4:15
10.	"If I Could Only Have Her Love Back"	Brown; Matkosky	Herndon; Brown	5:04
11.	"There Will Be a Better Day"	Brown; Beth Nielsen Chapman	Herndon; Brown	4:09
Total length:				42:42

== Personnel ==
- Ty Herndon – vocals
- Tony Harrell – keyboards
- John Barlow Jarvis – keyboards
- J. T. Corenflos – guitars
- Bruce Gaitsch - guitars
- Gregg Galbraith – guitars
- Kenny Greenberg – guitars
- Dan Dugmore – pedal steel guitar
- Jim Hoke – pedal steel guitar, harmonica
- Alison Prestwood – bass
- Michael Rhodes – bass
- Chad Cromwell – drums
- Craig Krampf – drums
- Chris McHugh – drums
- Greg Morrow – drums
- Matthew Burgess – percussion
- Jonathan Yudkin – strings, string arrangements
- Bob Bailey – backing vocals
- Lisa Bevill – backing vocals
- Perry Coleman – backing vocals
- Joanna Cotten – backing vocals
- Marcus Hummon – backing vocals
- Kim Richey – backing vocals
- Jocelyn Taylor – backing vocals
- Leah Taylor – backing vocals
- Keifer Thompson – backing vocals
- Shawna Thompson – backing vocals
- Emily West – backing vocals

=== Production ===
- Leigh Brannon – executive producer, A&R, management
- David Leonard – engineer, mixing
- Sang Park – additional tracking engineer
- Mike Paragone – additional overdub and vocal engineer
- William Sender – assistant engineer
- Heather Sturm – assistant engineer
- Mills Logan – mastering at The Kitten Club (Nashville, Tennessee)
- Alex Finley V – client service
- Steven Krook – client service
- Aaron Povick – client service
- Doug Grau – project manager
- Garrett Rittenberry – design
- Sebastian Paul – cover design, logo design
- Clay Enos – photography
- evolvedmedia.net – photo imaging
- Susie Kirsch – make-up

== Charts ==
Weekly chart performance for Right About Now
Chart (2007)	Peak position
US Top Country Albums (Billboard)	41
US Independent Albums (Billboard)	24
