= It Must Be Love (Ty Herndon song) =

Single by Ty Herndon

from the album Big Hopes
- B-side: "A Man Holdin' On (To a Woman Lettin' Go)"
- Released: July 27, 1998
- Genre: Country
- Length: 3:32
- Label: Epic
- Songwriters: Craig Bickhardt; Jack Sundrud
- Producer: Doug Johnson

Ty Herndon singles chronology
"A Man Holdin' On (To a Woman Lettin' Go)" (1998)	"It Must Be Love" (1998)	"Hands of a Working Man" (1999)

"It Must Be Love" is a song by American country music singer Ty Herndon, taken from his third studio album Big Hopes (1998). The song, penned by Craig Bickhardt and Jack Sundrud and produced by Doug Johnson, was released on July 27, 1998, as the second single from the album. Sons of the Desert is featured in the chorus of the song.

This single became a success, becoming his third and final number one single on the US Hot Country Songs chart, and giving Herndon his sole top-forty entry on the Hot 100.

== Content ==
The song, written by Craig Bickhardt and Jack Sundrud, features the narrator of how he finds himself acting uncharacteristically, unable to control his emotions, because he is in love. The chorus uses a question-and-answer format, with the group Sons of the Desert singing the questions, as the narrator's conscience, and Herndon, the narrator, performing the answers — until the last line, where they all sing together. The song is in the key of E major.

Sundrud wrote the song while a member of the band Great Plains, and was working with Bickhardt for songs on what would become that band's second album Homeland. According to Sundrud, he wanted to write something that could be sung by all three of the band's vocalists; at the time, Bickhardt was in the process of selling his house and found himself having difficulty concentrating on songwriting until Sundrud engaged him in conversation. Great Plains ultimately did not record the song, thus allowing it to be available for Herndon.

== Critical reception ==
In a retrospective review, Kevin John Coyne of Country Universe reviewed it positively and called it one of "the freshest sounding singles of the late nineties."

== Commercial performance ==
"It Must Be Love" debuted at number 62 on the US Billboard Hot Country Songs chart the week of August 15, 1998. The track would enter the top ten of the chart on November 14, 1998, becoming Herndon's sixth top-ten hit. On December 7, 1998, "It Must Be Love" would rise to the number one spot and stay there for one week, giving Herndon his third and final number one single to date. The track displaced The Chicks's "Wide Open Spaces" before being replaced by Faith Hill's "Let Me Let Go". The song spent 26 weeks on the chart and would be Epic Nashville's final number one single until 2004 when Gretchen Wilson would reach the top spot with "Redneck Woman". "It Must Be Love" would also peak at number 38 on the Billboard Hot 100, giving Herndon his sole top-forty entry on that chart.

== Charts ==
=== Weekly charts ===
Chart (1998)	Peak position
Canada Country Singles (RPM)	10
US Billboard Hot 100	38
US Hot Country Songs (Billboard)	1
US Radio Songs (Billboard)	28
US Country Top 50 (Radio & Records)	2

=== Year-end charts ===
1998 year-end chart performance for "It Must Be Love"
Chart (1998)	Position
US Hot Country Singles & Tracks (Billboard)	78
US Country Top 50 (Radio & Records)	55
US Country (Gavin Report)	24

1999 year-end chart performance for "It Must Be Love"
Chart (1999)	Position
US Hot Country Singles & Tracks (Billboard)	79
US Country Top 50 (Radio & Records)	74
