= Loved Too Much =

Single by Ty Herndon

from the album Living in a Moment
- Released: March 10, 1997
- Genre: Country
- Length: 3:41
- Label: Epic
- Songwriters: Don Schlitz; Billy Livsey
- Producer: Doug Johnson

Ty Herndon singles chronology
"She Wants to Be Wanted Again" (1996)	"Loved Too Much" (1997)	"I Have to Surrender" (1997)

"Loved Too Much" is a song written by Billy Livsey and Don Schlitz, and recorded by American country music artist Ty Herndon. It was released in March 1997 as the third single from his album Living in a Moment. The song reached number 2 on the Billboard Hot Country Singles & Tracks chart in June 1997.

== Chart performance ==
"Loved Too Much" debuted at number 73 on the U.S. Billboard Hot Country Singles & Tracks for the week of March 22, 1997 and peaked as high as number two for two consecutive weeks, but was kept out of the top spot by "It's Your Love" by Tim McGraw and Faith Hill.

Chart (1997)	Peak position
Canada Country Singles (RPM)	2
US Hot Country Songs (Billboard)	2

=== Year-end charts ===
Chart (1997)	Position
Canada Country Tracks (RPM)	43
US Country Songs (Billboard)	33
