= No Mercy (Ty Herndon song) =

Single by Ty Herndon

from the album Steam
- B-side: "Tears in God's Eyes"
- Released: January 10, 2000
- Genre: Country
- Length: 4:46
- Label: Epic
- Songwriters: Todd Cerney; Dennis Morgan; Stephen Allen Davis
- Producer: Joe Scaife

Ty Herndon singles chronology
"Steam" (1999)	"No Mercy" (2000)	"A Love Like That" (2000)

"No Mercy" is a song by American country music artist Ty Herndon. It was written by Todd Cerney, Dennis Morgan, and Stephen Allen Davis and produced by Joe Scaife. It was released on January 10, 2000, as the second single to his fourth studio album Steam (1999).

It reached number 26 on the US Hot Country Songs chart.

== Critical reception ==
Deborah Evans Price of Billboard reviewed the single favorably, saying that the song was "equally sensuous" to "Steam". She added that Herndon "sounds cool and controlled with his fine vocal".

== Music video ==
The video for "No Mercy" was directed by Eric Welch. It debuted to CMT on January 16, 2000.

== Commercial performance ==
"No Mercy" debuted on the US Billboard Hot Country Songs chart the week of January 22, 2000, at number 68. It reached a peak position of number 26 on the chart the week of May 6, 2000, becoming Herndon's 12th top-forty hit. It spent 20 weeks in total on the chart. It also briefly charted on the Billboard Hot 100 at number 92, becoming his sixth and most recent entry on the chart.

== Track listing ==
CD single
No.	Title	Writer(s)	Producer	Length
1.	"No Mercy"	Dennis Morgan; Todd Cerney; Stephen Allen Davis	Joe Scaife	4:46
2.	"Tears in God's Eyes"	Skip Ewing; Kim Williams	Doug Johnson	4:36

== Charts ==
Chart (2000)	Peak position
Canada Country Singles (RPM)	44
US Billboard Hot 100	92
US Hot Country Songs (Billboard)	26
