= I Have to Surrender =

Single by Ty Herndon

from the album Living in a Moment
- Released: September 20, 1997
- Genre: Country
- Length: 3:25
- Label: Epic
- Songwriters: Pat Bunch, Doug Johnson
- Producer: Doug Johnson

Ty Herndon singles chronology
"Loved Too Much" (1997)	"I Have to Surrender" (1997)	"A Man Holdin' On (To a Woman Lettin' Go)" (1998)

"I Have to Surrender" is a song written by Pat Bunch and Doug Johnson, and recorded by American country music artist Ty Herndon. It was released in September 1997 as the fourth single from the album Living in a Moment. The song reached number 17 on the Billboard Hot Country Singles & Tracks chart.

== Chart performance ==
Chart (1997)	Peak position
Canada Country Singles (RPM)	14
US Hot Country Songs (Billboard)	17
