= Vince Melamed =

American keyboardist and songwriter

- Born: New York, United States
- Occupations: Songwriter; Musician
- Instrument: Keyboard
- Years active: 1970s–present
- Formerly of: Run C & W

Vincent Edward "Vince" Melamed is an American keyboardist and songwriter who resides in Nashville, Tennessee. He was born in New York, and moved to Los Angeles at an early age. Melamed has appeared with many bands as a keyboardist (Bob Dylan, JD Souther, Eagles, Jimmy Buffett, Dan Fogelberg, Glenn Frey) and has co-written songs for other artists, including "Walkaway Joe" by Trisha Yearwood, "What Mattered Most" by Ty Herndon, "Tell Me What You Dream" by Restless Heart, "I'll Take That as a Yes (The Hot Tub Song)" by Phil Vassar, and "She'd Give Anything" by Boy Howdy. Melamed has received numerous BMI Million Air awards.

In the early 1990s, he was part of Run C & W, with fellow musicians Jim Photoglo, Russell Smith of the Amazing Rhythm Aces and former Eagles member Bernie Leadon. He participated as a counselor for the 2005 Rock 'n Roll Fantasy Camp.
