= You Can Leave Your Hat On =

1972 promotional single by Randy Newman

Promotional single by Randy Newman

from the album Sail Away
- Released: December 15, 1972
- Recorded: 1972
- Genre: Rock
- Length: 3:18
- Label: Reprise
- Songwriter: Randy Newman
- Producers: Lenny Waronker; Russ Titelman

"You Can Leave Your Hat On" is a song written by the American musician Randy Newman and appearing on his 1972 album Sail Away. Famous cover versions have been sung by Joe Cocker, Etta James, Tom Jones and Ty Herndon.

At its original release, Record World called it "an extraordinarily reproduced and newly arranged version of this very funny song with a funky melody line and unique Newman vocalizing."

According to a retrospective AllMusic review by Mark Deming, the song is a "potent mid-tempo rock tune" and a "witty and willfully perverse bit of erotic absurdity". Newman later admitted the song was "too low for me to sing it. I can't rock it too hard, which maybe I should have... or maybe not."

== Joe Cocker version ==
"You Can Leave Your Hat On"
- Front cover of the single released in Australia with a photograph from the film 9½ Weeks.

Single by Joe Cocker

from the album Cocker
- B-side: depending on country: "Shelter Me"; "Don't You Love Me Anymore"; "Long Drag off a Cigarette"; "Put out the Light"
- Released: February 10, 1986
- Recorded: 1985
- Studio: Ocean Way Recording (Los Angeles, CA)
- Genre: Blues rock; R&B; soul
- Length: 4:14
- Label: EMI
- Songwriter: Randy Newman
- Producer: Richie Zito

Joe Cocker singles chronology
"Don't You Love Me Anymore" (1986)	"You Can Leave Your Hat On" (1986)	"Heart of the Matter" (1986)

British singer Joe Cocker recorded "You Can Leave Your Hat On" for his 1986 album Cocker. Released as a single, Cocker's version peaked at No. 35 on Billboard Hot Mainstream Rock Tracks, and it was featured in the 1986 Adrian Lyne film 9½ Weeks during Kim Basinger's striptease scene.

=== Music video ===
A music video was released which featured footage of the striptease scene from 9½ Weeks and scenes with Cocker and his band performing the song.

=== Personnel ===
- Joe Cocker – lead vocals
- Richie Zito – production, guitar
- Arthur Barrow – keyboards, bass
- Mike Baird – drums
- Dick Hyde – trombone
- Joel Peskin – saxophones
- Steve Madaio – trumpet
- Elisecia Wright – backing vocals
- Julia Tillman Waters – backing vocals
- Maxine Green – backing vocals

== Other well-known cover versions ==
Etta James covered the song in 1976 for her album Etta Is Betta Than Evvah!. Charles Morris opines she "funked up the rhythm, a horn section howled and her delivery, complete with squeals and moans, smouldered with rising intensity". The Welsh singer Tom Jones covered the song for the soundtrack of the 1997 British film The Full Monty, and it is included in the subsequent 2013 play of the same name. As a medley with Hot Chocolate's "You Sexy Thing" and Donna Summer's "Hot Stuff", the track reached Number 62 in the UK Singles Chart in 1998, under the title "The Full Monty – Monster Mix".

The American country music singer Ty Herndon covered the song on his 1999 album, Steam. Herndon's version reached No. 72 on the Billboard Hot Country Singles & Tracks chart from unsolicited airplay and was included on his 2002 compilation, This Is Ty Herndon: Greatest Hits.
