= A Man Holdin' On (To a Woman Lettin' Go) =

Single by Ty Herndon

from the album Big Hopes
- B-side: "Just Enough to Get to Memphis"
- Released: March 23, 1998
- Genre: Country
- Length: 3:36
- Label: Epic
- Songwriters: Bobby Taylor; Gene Dobbins; John Ramey
- Producer: Byron Gallimore

Ty Herndon singles chronology
"I Have to Surrender" (1997)	"A Man Holdin' On (To a Woman Lettin' Go)" (1998)	"It Must Be Love" (1998)

"A Man Holdin' On (To a Woman Lettin' Go)" is a song written by Gene Dobbins, John Ramey and Bobby Taylor, and recorded by American country music artist Ty Herndon. It was released in March 1998 as the first single from his album Big Hopes. The song reached number 5 on the Billboard Hot Country Singles & Tracks chart in July 1998.

== Content ==
The song offers up different lyrical snapshots of men in difficult transitions. These include a woman losing her virginity, a lady who has broken up with a man who turns to drink, a father "walking his daughter down the aisle" at a wedding, and an old man whose wife is dying. In each case, a man is struggling to hold on to "a woman letting go".

== Critical reception ==
Larry Flick, of Billboard magazine reviewed the song favorably saying that the "caliber of the song, combined with Herndon's strong vocal performance and Byron Gallimore's skilled production, should guarantee it heavy airplay."

== Music video ==
The music video was directed by Steven Goldmann and premiered in early 1998.

== Chart performance ==
"A Man Holdin' On" debuted at number 74 on the U.S. Billboard Hot Country Singles & Tracks for the week of March 28, 1998.

Chart (1998)	Peak position
Canada Country Singles (RPM)	14
US Billboard Hot 100	81
US Hot Country Songs (Billboard)	5

=== Year-end charts ===
Chart (1998)	Position
Canada Country Tracks (RPM)	92
US Country Songs (Billboard)	47
