= What Mattered Most (song) =

1995 single by Ty Herndon

Single by Ty Herndon

from the album What Mattered Most
- B-side: "You Don't Mess Around with Jim"
- Released: February 6, 1995
- Genre: Country
- Length: 3:41
- Label: Epic
- Songwriters: Gary Burr; Vince Melamed
- Producer: Doug Johnson

Ty Herndon singles chronology
"What Mattered Most" (1995)	"I Want My Goodbye Back" (1995)

"What Mattered Most" is a song written by Gary Burr and Vince Melamed, and recorded by American country music singer Ty Herndon. It was released in February 1995 as Herndon's debut single and served as the lead single and title track from his debut album What Mattered Most. It became Herndon's first number-one single on the Billboard Hot Country Singles & Tracks chart.

== History ==
Upon its release, the song was added to the playlists of 133 radio stations surveyed by Billboard, breaking a record set by Tracy Lawrence for the most adds in one week.

The song was later included as the B-side to Herndon's early-1996 single "In Your Face," which peaked at 63 on the country charts.

== Critical reception ==
Deborah Evans Price of Billboard magazine reviewed the song unfavorably saying that while Herndon turns in a "credible vocal performance", it is "a shame that this formulaic, by-the-numbers song, written by two Nashville pros, doesn't make much of an impression." Michael McCall of New Country was more positive, calling it "a powerful, sensitive song about a man who realizes, too late, that he noticed everything about his lover except what was in her heart."

== Personnel ==
From What Mattered Most liner notes.

- Gary Burr - background vocals
- Joe Chemay - bass guitar
- Dan Dugmore - steel guitar
- Paul Franklin - Dobro
- Rob Hajacos - fiddle
- Kraig Hutchens - electric guitar
- Mike Jones - background vocals
- Paul Leim - drums
- Terry McMillan - percussion
- Steve Nathan - keyboards
- Brent Rowan - electric guitar
- Biff Watson - acoustic guitar

== Music video ==
The music video was directed by Steven Goldmann and premiered in early 1995.

== Chart positions ==
"What Mattered Most" debuted at number 62 on the U.S. Billboard Hot Country Singles & Tracks for the week of February 25, 1995.

Chart (1995)	Peak position
Canada Country Singles (RPM)	1
US Billboard Hot 100	90
US Hot Country Songs (Billboard)	1

=== Year-end charts ===
Chart (1995)	Position
Canada Country Tracks (RPM)	43
US Country Songs (Billboard)	18

== 2019 version ==
"What Mattered Most (Alternative Version)"

Song by Ty Herndon

from the album Got It Covered
- Released: June 4, 2019
- Genre: Country
- Length: 3:53
- Label: BFD
- Songwriters: Gary Burr; Vince Melamed
- Producers: Ty Herndon; Erik Halbig

On June 4, 2019, Herndon re-released the song for Pride Month. For this version, Herndon swapped the gender pronouns to reflect his status as an openly gay man. The single is the first released from his Got It Covered record, released in August. Its release marks Herndon's return to his standard country pop after the release of four dance singles. Herndon revealed in an interview with NPR that he was in a closeted relationship with a man at the time of the song's original release in 1995. That relationship and that of his parents inspired his performance of the track. After coming out of closet, Herndon began performing the song with mixed genders, beginning the song with its traditional lyrics and switching to male pronouns before the end.

== Music video ==
The music video for the updated version of What Mattered Most features Herndon singing in a studio and surrounded by sound engineers and producers. He introduces the video by saying that he is now "brave enough" to record the song the way it should have been recorded.
