= Living in a Moment (song) =

Single by Ty Herndon

from the album Living in a Moment
- B-side: "Returning the Faith"
- Released: June 17, 1996
- Genre: Country pop
- Length: 3:52
- Label: Epic
- Songwriters: Pat Bunch; Doug Johnson
- Producer: Doug Johnson

Ty Herndon singles chronology
"In Your Face" (1996)	"Living in a Moment" (1996)	"She Wants to Be Wanted Again" (1996)

"Living in a Moment" is a song written by Pat Bunch and Doug Johnson, and recorded by American country music artist Ty Herndon. It was released in June 1996 as the first single and title track from his album of the same name. In October of that year, it became his second Number One hit (see 1996 in country music).

== Content ==
"Living in a Moment" is a moderate up-tempo country pop song in which the male narrator expresses his satisfaction with the lover he has found ("The world just lost two lonely people / The world just lost two broken hearts"). He elaborates on this point in the chorus by saying that he is "living in a moment [he] could die for".

== Critical reception ==
Allmusic critic Thom Owens considered the track one of the stronger songs on the album.

== Music video ==
The music video was directed by Steven Goldmann and premiered in mid-1996. It was filmed in and around Sunset Station in San Antonio, Texas. The video starred Ty Herndon and model/actress Donna W. Scott.

== Chart positions ==
"Living in a Moment" debuted at number 56 on the U.S. Billboard Hot Country Singles & Tracks for the week of June 29, 1996.

Chart (1996)	Peak position
Canada Country Singles (RPM)	1
US Hot Country Songs (Billboard)	1

=== Year-end charts ===
Chart (1996)	Position
Canada Country Tracks (RPM)	13
US Country Songs (Billboard)	6
