= Pat Bunch =

American songwriter (1939–2023)

- Born: Patricia Karen Bunch; June 22, 1939
- Died: January 30, 2023 (aged 83) Cross Plains, Tennessee, U.S.
- Genres: Country
- Occupation: Singer-songwriter
- Instruments: Guitar, vocals
- Years active: 1976–2023

Patricia Karen Bunch (June 22, 1939 – January 30, 2023) was an American country music songwriter. Born in Zanesville Ohio, Patricia Karen Hendershot. After moving to Phoenix Arizona in October of 1963, she met and married her second husband. She started her songwriting career under the name Pat Bunch in 1974 which was her last name from her second marriage. She decided to keep the last name, "Bunch" since that was how everyone one knew her professionally in Nashville even though she remarried to her third husband in 1975. After seeing Kris Kristofferson at a concert in Phoenix, she met him backstage and asked him if she could successfully be in the music business without relocating to Nashville. He told her no, so in the Fall of 1974 she made the move to Nashville. Much of her earlier chart hits resulted from collaborations with fellow songwriters Mary Ann Kennedy and Pam Rose. Bunch also had multiple chart successes co-writing with Doug Johnson. Bunch's co-writing credits include the Grammy Award-nominated song "I'll Still Be Loving You" by Restless Heart. Other songs that she has written include "Wild One" by Faith Hill and "Living in a Moment" by Ty Herndon.

Bunch died at her home in Cross Plains, Tennessee, on January 30, 2023, at the age of 83.

== Chart singles ==
The following is a list of Pat Bunch compositions that were chart hits.

Year	Single Title	Recording Artist	Chart Positions		
Year	Single Title	Recording Artist	Billboard Hot 100	Billboard AC	Billboard Country
1979	Ten Thousand and One co-written with Dan Mitchell	Connie Smith			88
1984	Me Against the Night co-written with Mary Ann Kennedy & Pam Rose	Crystal Gayle			4
1985	The First Word in Memory Is Me co-written with Mary Ann Kennedy & Pam Rose	Janie Fricke			7
1985	Somebody Else's Fire co-written with Mary Ann Kennedy & Pam Rose	Janie Fricke			4
1987	I'll Still Be Loving You co-written with Mary Ann Kennedy, Todd Cerney & Pam Rose	Restless Heart	33	3	1
1987	He's Letting Go co-written with Mary Ann Kennedy & Pam Rose	Baillie & the Boys			18
1993	Wild One co-written with Jaime Kyle & Will Rambeaux	Faith Hill			1
1994	You Wouldn't Say That to a Stranger co-written with Doug Crider	Suzy Bogguss			43
1995	I Want My Goodbye Back co-written with Dave Berg & Doug Johnson	Ty Herndon			7
1995	Love Like This co-written with Mary Ann Kennedy & Pam Rose	Carlene Carter			70
1995	Safe in the Arms of Love co-written with Mary Ann Kennedy & Pam Rose	Martina McBride			4
1995	What If Jesus Comes Back Like That co-written with Doug Johnson	Collin Raye			21
1996	Living in a Moment co-written with Doug Johnson	Ty Herndon			1
1997	I Have to Surrender co-written with Doug Johnson	Ty Herndon			17
1999	Slow Dance More co-written with Doug Johnson	Kenny Rogers			67
2000	Santa's Got a Semi co-written with Doug Johnson	Keith Harling			60
2000	I Need You All the Time co-written with Jimmy Price & Shane Teeters	Blackhawk			40
2001	Even Then co-written with Shane Teeters	John Michael Montgomery			59
2005	She Didn't Have Time co-written with Nicole Witt	Terri Clark			25
2006	Come On Rain co-written with Doug Johnson	Steve Holy			35
2013	Better I Don't co-written with Chris Janson and Kelly Janson	Chris Janson			40
