= Hands of a Working Man =

Single by Ty Herndon

from the album Big Hopes
- Released: January 4, 1999
- Genre: Country
- Length: 3:47
- Label: Epic
- Songwriters: D. Vincent Williams; Jim Collins
- Producer: Byron Gallimore

Ty Herndon singles chronology
"It Must Be Love" (1998)	"Hands of a Working Man" (1999)	"Steam" (1999)

"Hands of a Working Man" is a song written by D. Vincent Williams and Jim Collins, and recorded by American country music artist Ty Herndon. It was released in January 1999 as the third single from his album, Big Hopes. The song reached number 5 on the Billboard Hot Country Singles & Tracks chart in May 1999, and was Herndon's last Top Ten country hit.

== Critical reception ==
Chuck Taylor, of Billboard magazine reviewed the song favorably saying that the Herndon "offers a solid song and a strong performance that should be widely embraced by country programmers and the working-class listeners who live this lyric."

== Music video ==
The music video was directed by Chris Rogers and premiered in early 1999.

== Chart performance ==
Chart (1999)	Peak position
Canada Country Singles (RPM)	18
US Billboard Hot 100	47
US Hot Country Songs (Billboard)	5

=== Year-end charts ===
Chart (1999)	Position
US Country Songs (Billboard)	34
