= Ty Herndon =

American country singer (born 1962)

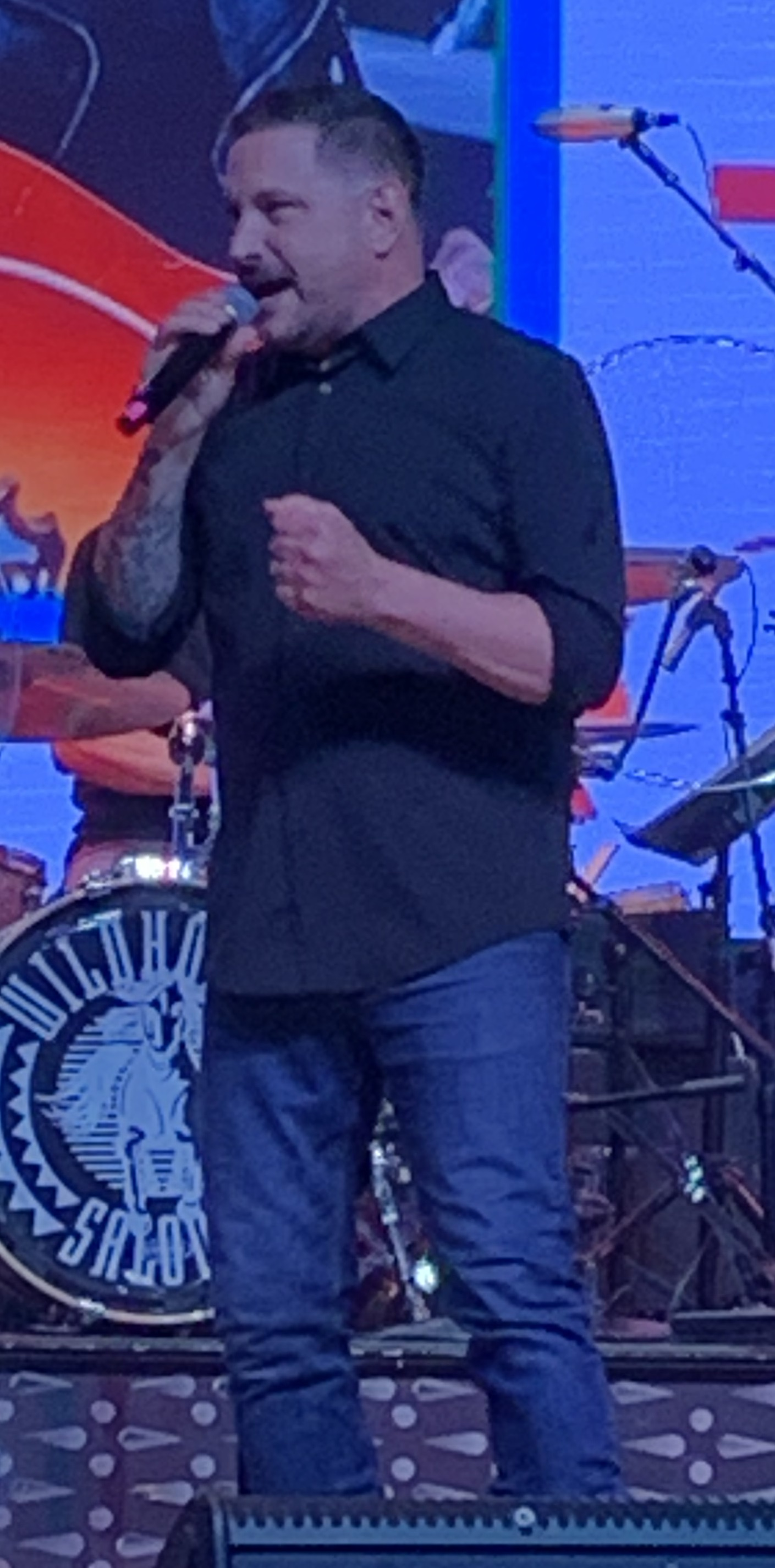
- Herndon at the Wildhorse Saloon, June 2023

Background information
- Born: Boyd Tyrone Herndon; May 2, 1962 (age 64); Meridian, Mississippi, U.S.
- Origin: Nashville, Tennessee, U.S.
- Genres: Country
- Occupations: Singer; songwriter
- Instrument: Vocals
- Years active: 1983–present
- Labels: Epic; Titan Pyramid; FUNL; BFD; Pivotal; Club44
- Formerly of: Tennessee River Boys
- Spouses: Renee Posey (m. 1993; div. 2002); Alex Schwartz (m. 2023)
- Partner: Matt Collum (2010–2021)
- Website: tyherndon.com

Boyd Tyrone Herndon (born May 2, 1962) is an American country music singer and songwriter. His music career began in the 1980s as a member of the Tennessee River Boys, a predecessor to the country band Diamond Rio. Herndon quit the band early on and gained his first national exposure as a competitor on Star Search. He then played at various honky-tonks in Texas. After signing to Epic Records in 1993, Herndon made his debut in 1995 with his single, "What Mattered Most", which reach number one on the Hot Country Songs chart published by Billboard. This was followed that same year by the release of his first album, also titled What Mattered Most.

Herndon released three more studio albums and a compilation for Epic: Living in a Moment (1996), Big Hopes (1998), Steam (1999), and This Is Ty Herndon: Greatest Hits (2002). He recorded a Christmas album in 2002 before a recording hiatus. He returned with his fifth studio album, Right About Now (2007) for the Titan Pyramid label; his sixth studio release, Journey On, followed in 2010. Herndon has charted a total of 17 singles on Hot Country Songs. This figure includes three number-one singles: "What Mattered Most", "Living in a Moment", and "It Must Be Love". His singles "I Want My Goodbye Back", "Loved Too Much", "A Man Holdin' On (To a Woman Lettin' Go)", and "Hands of a Working Man" all made top ten on the same chart.

Herndon gained further media attention in 2014 after he came out as gay, becoming the first mainstream male country music singer to do so. His personal life has been the subject of mainstream media for other reasons, including his struggles with drug addiction and mental health. His musical style is defined by his singing voice and an emphasis on ballads.

== Early life ==
Boyd Tyrone Herndon was born on May 2, 1962, in Meridian, Mississippi, to Boyd and Renee Herndon. He was raised just across the state line in Butler, Alabama. His grandmother played guitar and hosted her own radio show in Butler. He became involved in music in his youth. Herndon's first performance on a stage came during this period, when he won $75 at a talent show in Toxey, Alabama.

Shortly after graduating from Austin High School in Decatur, Alabama, Herndon moved to Nashville, Tennessee, to pursue a career in country music. At this point he also attended Belmont University. Herndon's first major role came in 1983 when he became lead vocalist of the Tennessee River Boys, a group that performed at the Opryland USA theme park in Nashville. This band was originally intended to perform a one-time show to promote the park, but became one of several regular performers there. Herndon left the band after only a year to become a contestant on the television talent show Star Search. Following Herndon's departure, the Tennessee River Boys underwent a number of membership changes and became Diamond Rio.

When his tenure on Star Search proved commercially unsuccessful, Herndon attempted to secure a recording contract in Nashville. He told The Tennessean in 1995 that multiple labels rejected him as they considered him a "pretty boy". Despite this, he found work singing jingles for Pepsi and Dodge, as well as demo tracks for other artists. He lost a significant amount of money due to an unfavorable management deal, which led to his mother having to sell her house to refinance the amount of money lost. In addition, Herndon's father died of a brain hemorrhage, putting further strain on both him and his family.

Herndon then moved to Texas and found work performing in various honky-tonks across the state, to regain some of the money he had lost. His tenure in Texas included a stint with Louise Mandrell in 1987 at Billy Bob's Texas, a country music nightclub in Fort Worth. He competed on another television talent show titled You Write the Songs in 1987, but was unsuccessful. Herndon also appeared on The Porter Wagoner Show, a musical variety show hosted by country singer Porter Wagoner. By 1989 he had formed a backing band called Bayou. This act opened for Little Texas in 1989 prior to that band's signing with Warner Records. In 1993, Herndon won a local music award called Texas Entertainer of the Year. At the awards ceremony, Herndon was discovered by a representative of Epic Records, and he signed with the label later in the year.

== Career ==
=== 1995–96: What Mattered Most ===
Herndon began recording music for Epic in 1994. He made his debut in early 1995 with the single "What Mattered Most", a song written by Gary Burr and Vince Melamed. The song went to number one on the Billboard Hot Country Songs charts in the United States and the former RPM country music charts in Canada. Follow-up single "I Want My Goodbye Back" reached a Hot Country Songs peak of number seven in 1995. Its b-side, a duet with Stephanie Bentley titled "Heart Half Empty", peaked at number 21 in early 1996. "In Your Face" was the last single from What Mattered Most. This song was the least successful, charting for two weeks and reaching number 63. The album featured backing vocals from several artists on Epic or sister label Columbia Records, including Patty Loveless, Joe Diffie, Ron Wallace, and Gibson/Miller Band member Blue Miller. Doug Johnson, then the vice-president of artists and repertoire (A&R) of Epic's Nashville branch, produced the album and co-wrote "I Want My Goodbye Back".

In addition to the singles, What Mattered Most included a cover of Jim Croce's "You Don't Mess Around with Jim". Another track, the Vince Gill and Don Schlitz composition "You Just Get One", was later recorded by Jeff Wood on his 1997 album Between the Earth and the Stars. Wood's rendition charted on Hot Country Songs that same year. "Heart Half Empty" later appeared on Bentley's 1996 album Hopechest, also issued on Epic. The music video for "What Mattered Most" was aired on CMT and the former TNN (The Nashville Network). Herndon promoted the album further by starting a tour in 1995.

Michael McCall of New Country magazine rated the album three-and-a-half stars out of five, as he considered Herndon's vocal delivery "confident" but was more mixed toward the lyrical content of the songs. An uncredited review published by Billboard was favorable, stating, "With a rich, expressive voice that is equally suited to pensive ballads and rollicking, uptempo tunes, Herndon is one of country's most impressive newcomers." In early 1997, What Mattered Most was certified gold by the Recording Industry Association of America (RIAA) for shipments of 500,000 copies. Executives of Sony Music Nashville, of which Epic was a division at the time, attributed the album's commercial success to a marketing strategy they employed at the time. Under this plan, albums by new artists were priced a dollar lower than the national average for sixty days after their release. These same executives also noted this strategy had been successful on albums by Wade Hayes and James House.

=== 1996–1997: Living in a Moment ===
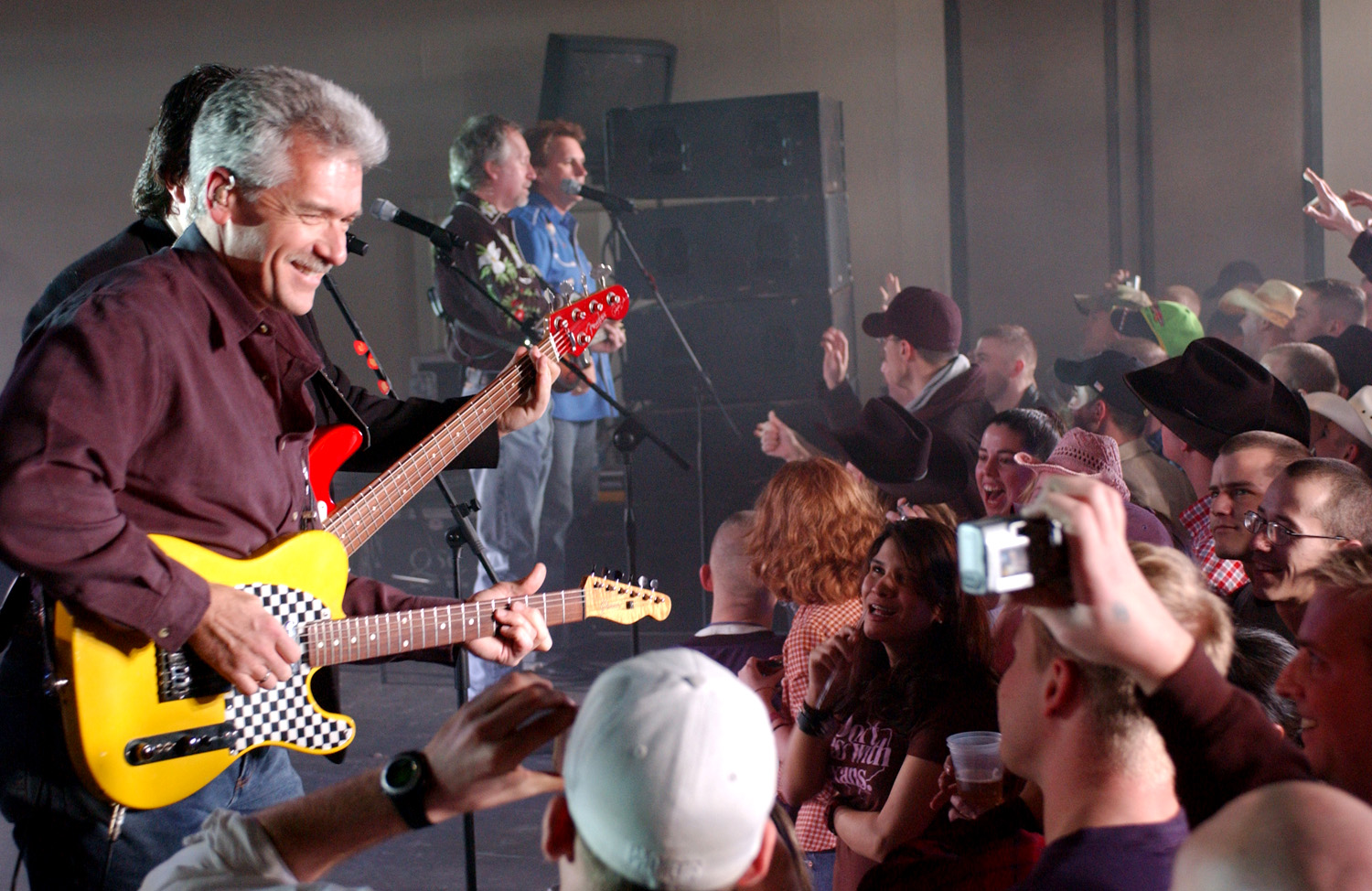
Herndon was a founding member of the Tennessee River Boys, who later became Diamond Rio (pictured in 2006).

In 1996, Herndon won the Male Star of Tomorrow, a fan-voted award from the TNN Music City News awards (now known as CMT Music Awards). His second album Living in a Moment was released in August of the same year. The album's lead single "Living in a Moment" reached number one on the country charts in both the US and Canada. Three more singles charted from the album throughout 1997. The first was "She Wants to Be Wanted Again", which peaked at number 21 early in the year. This song had been recorded by Lee Greenwood, Restless Heart vocalist Larry Stewart, and Western Flyer prior to Herndon's rendition. After "She Wants to Be Wanted Again" came the number two hit "Loved Too Much" and the top-twenty "I Have to Surrender". Johnson co-wrote "Living in a Moment" and "I Have to Surrender", and once again served as producer. Stephanie Bentley, Blue Miller, and John Wesley Ryles were among the album's backing vocalists. Also contributing in this capacity were Doug Virden and Drew Womack, then recording on Epic in Sons of the Desert.

Thom Owens of Allmusic wrote, "Although he is in fine voice throughout the album, Ty Herndon's Living in a Moment is bogged down by mediocre material that fails to given him a proper showcase for his talents." He considered the title track and "Don't Tell Mama" the strongest lyrically. Alanna Nash of Entertainment Weekly similarly thought "Don't Tell Mama" was the strongest track, but criticized the rest of the album as "formulaic". Colin Larkin of the Virgin Encyclopedia of Country Music thought this album had "a shortage of standout material". The album's closing track "I Know How the River Feels" was later a single in 1999 for Diamond Rio. Living in a Moment was also certified gold in 1997.

=== 1998–2000: Big Hopes and Steam ===
Big Hopes, Herndon's third album, followed in 1998. Doug Johnson produced five of the tracks and Byron Gallimore, best known for his work with Tim McGraw, produced the other six. Herndon told the Journal & Courier that he considered Gallimore to have a more "understated" production style that put greater emphasis on his vocals than Johnson's production did. Lead single "A Man Holdin' On (To a Woman Lettin' Go)", one of the tracks produced by Gallimore, was a top-five country hit that same year. After it came Herndon's third and final number-one single "It Must Be Love", which also became his only top-40 hit on the Billboard Hot 100. The song featured uncredited backing vocals from Sons of the Desert. Jack Sundrud, formerly of Poco, had co-written "It Must Be Love" for Great Plains, another band he was a member of at the time. When they did not record the song, it became available for Herndon. "Hands of a Working Man" was also a top-five country hit from Big Hopes.

Walter Allread of Country Standard Time wrote that the tracks produced by Gallimore, such as the title track, were stronger due to their "smaller" production style relative to those produced by Johnson. Thom Owens of AllMusic was mixed toward the album, as he thought that it had "filler" tracks and "glossy production", although he praised Herndon's singing on "A Man Holdin' On" and "Hands of a Working Man". Uncredited reviews of "A Man Holdin' On" and "Hands of a Working Man" in Billboard were both favorable. The former was praised for Gallimore's production and the "unique perspective...of men in difficult transitions", while the latter was described as being appealing to working class listeners due to its lyrical focus on a father's struggles.

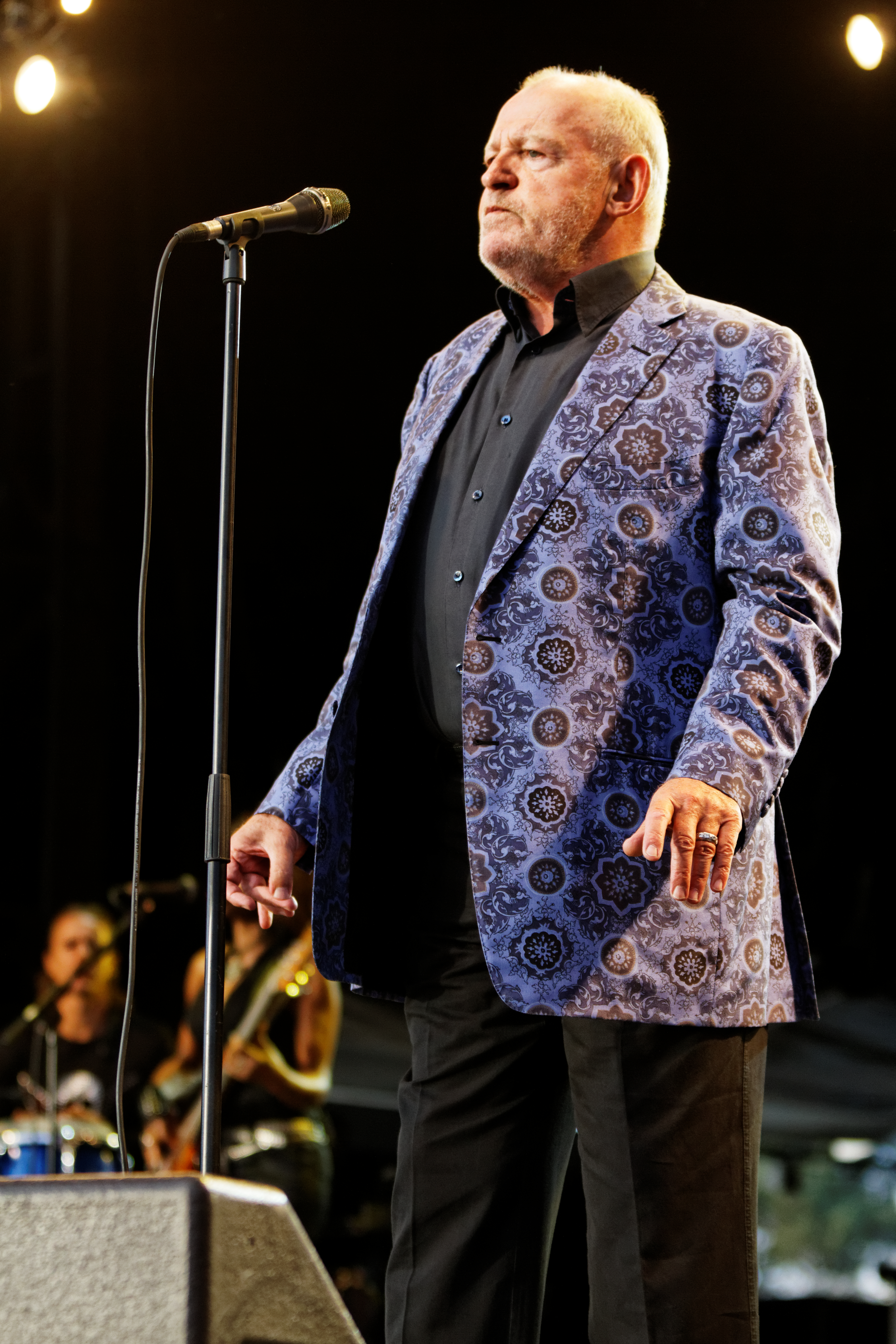
Herndon's 1999 album Steam included a cover of Joe Cocker's "You Can Leave Your Hat On".

In 1999, Epic released his next studio album Steam. Herndon selected a new producer for this album, as he thought his previous albums did not reflect the energy of his live performances. He chose Joe Scaife because of that producer's work with K.T. Oslin, a 1980s country artist Herndon referred to as "one of [his] all-time favorites". Herndon selected the songs for the album by performing them in concert so he and Scaife could gauge the audience's reaction to each. In addition, Herndon recorded demos with his road band, which he then played for the album's session musicians to give them an idea of how he wanted each song to sound. Among the involved musicians were drummer Paul Leim, steel guitar player Dan Dugmore, and guitarist Chris Leuzinger of Garth Brooks' studio band The G-Men. The album also included a horn section fronted by Jim Horn, and a string section including members of the Nashville String Machine. "Steam", the album's title track, was also its lead single. It reached top twenty by the end of 1999, but was less successful than the lead singles of Herndon's previous albums. Two other singles, "No Mercy" and "A Love Like That", peaked even lower.

Also included on the album was a cover of Joe Cocker's "You Can Leave Your Hat On", which Herndon had sung in concert for many years prior. While not a single, the cover charted at number 72 on Hot Country Songs in 2000 due to unsolicited radio airplay. Herndon considered the album more "sexy" than his previous efforts, citing both this cover and the title track as examples. Dan MacIntosh of Country Standard Time considered Herndon "too darn polite" for such material, also criticizing the album for "by-the-numbers" arrangements. A more favorable review came from AllMusic, whose Maria Konicki Dinoia wrote, "With a new production team in tow, Herndon has played a bigger part in selecting the album's songs...and it's clear he sings from the heart, as he always has." Deborah Evans Price of Billboard found both "Steam" and "No Mercy" "equally sensuous" in a review of the latter.

=== 2001–2004: Departure from Epic Records ===
In late 2001, Epic released the song "Heather's Wall", which was intended to be the lead single from Herndon's fifth album for the label. At the time, Herndon was considering exiting the music business to star in a Broadway theatre production of Urban Cowboy, but decided against it. Paul Worley, the producer with whom he was working at the time, recommended "Heather's Wall" to him when the two were selecting songs. Herndon originally rejected the song as "too heavy", but decided to record it after the September 11 attacks inspired him to record music again. Although the song was well-received by fans, it was unsuccessful on the singles charts and his fifth Epic album was not released.

Epic then released a greatest hits package titled This Is Ty Herndon: Greatest Hits before dropping him from the label. Herndon released a Christmas album, A Not So Silent Night, in 2002 through his fan club and official website. A year later, the Christmas album was repackaged with additional content and released on the independent label Riviera/Liquid8 Records. Otherwise, he took a hiatus from recording at this point due to a number of personal issues that included weight gain, divorce, and drug and alcohol addiction.

=== 2004–2010: Right About Now and Journey On ===
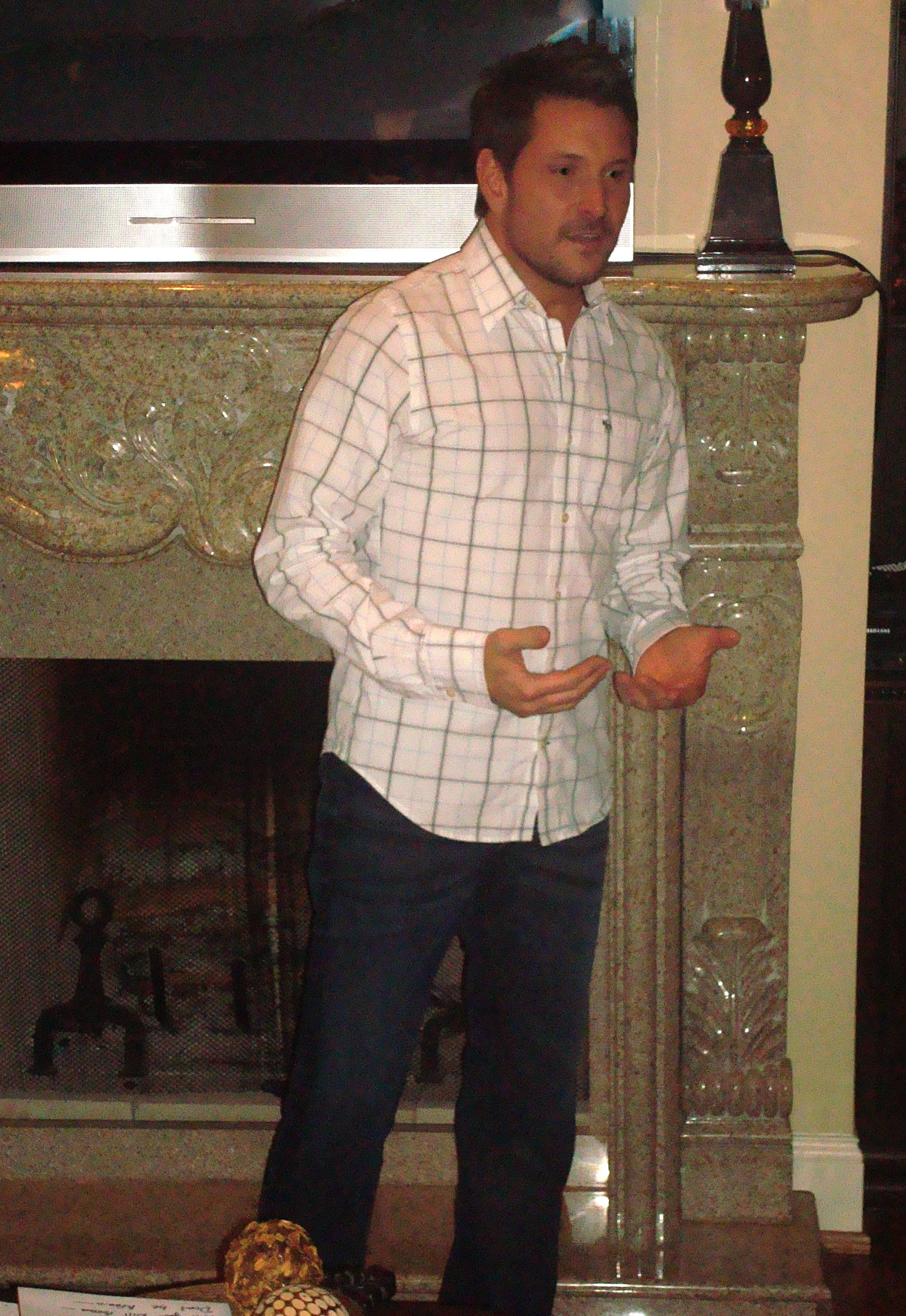
Herndon at the 2009 Point of Hope Fundraiser pre-party

He returned to touring and singing in 2004 when songwriter Darrell Brown invited him to perform at the Nashville nightclub Bluebird Café. This led to him signing with Titan Pyramid Records in 2006 and releasing the album Right About Now in early 2007. Brown and Herndon co-produced the album with songwriter Dennis Matkosky and session musician Jonathan Yudkin. Backing vocalists included Marcus Hummon, Joanna Cotten, Emily West, and Thompson Square. Thom Jurek of AllMusic reviewed the album favorably, stating that "Herndon's voice is not only unchanged from his missing years, it's stronger, his phrasing is tighter and more expressive, and his manner of handling a song is entirely his own." One track from this album was a cover of Johnny Reid's "You Still Own Me", itself later a single in late 2007 for Canadian country band Emerson Drive.

Herndon's next album was Journey On, released on the independent FUNL label in 2010. The album featured mostly contemporary Christian music songs, all of which Herndon wrote or co-wrote over the span of six months. Herndon said that he did not intend for the album to be a Christian project, but found that as he was writing, many of the songs tended toward reflecting his "spiritual growth". He also said that he found the album "fun" because of how much control he had over assembling musicians and recording compared to his previous releases.

The album was nominated at the 53rd Grammy Awards for Grammy Award for Best Southern, Country or Bluegrass Gospel Album. "Journey On" was selected by American football player Kevin Turner as the theme song for his Kevin Turner Foundation. This foundation is dedicated to research of amyotrophic lateral sclerosis or Lou Gehrig's Disease, which Turner had been recently diagnosed with at the time. After Journey On, he released a non-album single titled "Stones", which was previously recorded for his unreleased Epic album in 2001. FUNL released the song to country radio without disclosing the artist's name, and held a contest with radio programmers to see if they could determine the singer.

=== 2013–present: Lies I Told Myself, House on Fire, Got It Covered. and Jacob ===
The album Lies I Told Myself followed in 2013, also on FUNL. Prior to the album's release, Herndon had performed the title track in concert, and chose to make it the lead single due to its positive reception from fans. He also noted that the track "Beautiful Love Song" had been written eight years prior and rejected by other artists, but he chose to record it because he liked the sound of the song's demo. Another track on the album, "Sugar", was co-written by country singer Sara Evans's brother, Matt Evans. Herndon compared this track to "Steam", and cited it as an example of the more "modern" sound he wanted on Lies I Told Myself. Herndon financed the album through a Kickstarter campaign, and supported it by touring with Jamie O'Neal and Andy Griggs. Matt Bjorke of Roughstock reviewed the album favorably, praising Herndon's vocals on the ballads in particular.

His next album was 2016's House on Fire, which once again featured several songs he co-wrote. It was his first release on the BFD label, and he co-produced with Drew Davis and Erik Halbig, a guitarist in Herndon's road band. Herndon described the title track as autobiographical, while in comparison, "All Night Tonight" came from Davis and Halbig wanting to write a "beach song".

This was followed in 2019 by Got It Covered, which featured re-recordings of his hit singles along with cover songs. Among the songs covered were Marc Cohn's "Walking in Memphis", Carrie Underwood's "So Small", and Bonnie Raitt's "I Can't Make You Love Me". Herndon said that he had almost considered retiring from country music due to the lack of success of his last few albums until he heard "So Small" on the radio. When Underwood found that Herndon had covered the song, she spoke favorably about it on social media. In 2020, Herndon collaborated with Kristin Chenoweth and Paul Cardall on a single titled "Orphans of God".

Herndon's next single release was "Till You Get There" in June 2022 on Pivotal Records. This was the lead single to his next studio album Jacob, released one month later. It included more songs that Herndon had written about his personal life. Country musicians Terri Clark, Emily West, and Shelly Fairchild provided guest vocals on individual tracks, as did jazz singer Wendy Moten. Herndon told Spin that the album's title came from the account of Jacob wrestling with the angel in the Book of Genesis. This was followed in late 2022 by another single titled "God or the Gun", which was accompanied by a music video. The third single from the project was "Dents on a Chevy", a duet with Terri Clark.

Herndon signed a three-album deal with the independent Club44 record label in June 2025. His first project for the label will be a compilation titled Thirty, which will include re-recordings of his hit singles. The first such re-recording to be released was of "What Mattered Most" with LeAnn Rimes as a duet partner.

== Musical style ==
Herndon's singing voice has generally been met with critical favor. Stephen Thomas Erlewine of AllMusic wrote of Ty Herndon's musical style, "His earnest delivery was a good match for the kind of streamlined country he sang—music that didn't shun tradition but was aligned with the anthemic, rock-influenced arena-country pioneered by Garth Brooks at the dawn of the '90s." In a review of Lies I Told Myself, Matt Bjorke of Roughstock wrote that "Ty's always been at his best on the ballads" and "sings his ass off showcasing a vocal many of the 'young guns' could learn from". Thom Jurek of AllMusic wrote that "Herndon has soul and plenty of it. You can hear the gospel in his voice, his love of the old country songs, but his delivery is thoroughly contemporary."

An article from Music City News magazine re-published in the Asheville Citizen-Times said of Herndon, "there is a passion in his ballads, and in the case of...'I Want My Goodbye Back', an edgy emotional twist that sends listeners careening along with him". Dan MacIntosh described Herndon as having "straight-with-no-frills singing". Walter Allread wrote of Herndon on the same site, "Country music now resembles early Sixties American pop, with producers the real artists and singers merely interchangeable faces on record sleeves. As long as Ty Herndon's nice voice and face can front a hit, he's good for another 100,000 miles of touring and audio tape."

The lyrical content of his Epic albums was met with mixed reception. Michael McCall of New Country found some of the tracks on What Mattered Most "shallow", such as "In Your Face" and "Heart Half Empty". Both Entertainment Weekly and AllMusic panned Living in a Moment for formulaic lyrics. In comparison, Herndon began writing songs in the 2010s; although he had not written previously, he thought that doing so would allow his albums to become more personal.

== Personal life ==
In June 1995, Herndon was arrested in Fort Worth, Texas, at Gateway Park by an undercover male police officer. This officer alleged that Herndon exposed himself. When taken into custody, Herndon was also discovered to be in possession of methamphetamine. Herndon filed a plea bargain and was sentenced to community service and drug rehabilitation, after which the charge of indecent exposure was dropped.

In 2002, Herndon underwent a series of personal setbacks. Early in the year, he was robbed at gunpoint in Los Angeles. He also had a lawsuit filed against him by a California dentist claiming that Herndon had not paid for emergency dental work and another lawsuit from a former manager for breach of contract. In addition, he relapsed into drug and alcohol addiction. This led to him experiencing depression and weight gain. After his friends noticed he had not left his apartment in several days, they flew him to Nashville, where he lived in his mother's basement for one month before re-entering rehabilitation. After completing this, he returned to performing in 2004.

Herndon's addiction to methamphetamine resulted in a second relapse in 2020, at which point he was discovered in his apartment with both methamphetamine and Ambien in his possession. According to him, this was the result of trauma from his first experience with metamphetamines at age 20, at which point he was raped. This was an attempted suicide, and would later serve as the inspiration behind his song "God or the Gun". Herndon successfully underwent drug rehabilitation a second time in late 2020-early 2021. In addition to this, Herndon was diagnosed with bipolar disorder in 2021. In August 2022, Herndon began a podcast called Soundboard with Ty Herndon, in which he discusses his personal life and mental health. Guests on the podcast have included singers LeAnn Rimes and Michael Ray.

=== Relationships and sexual orientation ===
Herndon married Renee Posey on March 13, 1993. The couple lived in Dallas, Texas, at the time, but held their wedding in Nashville. During the 1990s, Posey worked as a registered nurse. Following Herndon's 1995 arrest, his sexuality became a topic of interest within the country music industry, as many presumed Herndon to be gay. At the time, Herndon's manager told The Advocate he did not know Herndon's orientation, but thought country music "was ready" for an artist to come out as gay. The editors of The Encyclopedia of Country Music wrote of the exposure incident that it "raised sexuality questions" within the genre, and that Herndon's continued commercial success throughout the rest of the 1990s indicated an unprecedented level of tolerance within the fandom. Herndon and Posey divorced in 2002.

Herndon came out as gay in a 2014 interview with People magazine, thus becoming the first mainstream male country star to do so. He stated that he had been in a gay relationship for several years at this point, and that his ex-wife and several close family members already knew. Herndon was partnered with his boyfriend Matt Collum for eleven years before the two amicably separated in 2021.

In relation to his coming out, Herndon re-issued "What Mattered Most" in June 2019 with the song's pronouns changed to reflect a gay relationship. This re-recording appeared on Got It Covered, and Herndon commented that he wished he could have recorded the song in that fashion at the time of its original release. Many of the songs on House on Fire, including the title track, are about the stigmas that Herndon felt he faced as a gay man in country music, typically a more conservative genre than most others. He also credited conversations with country singer Chely Wright, who came out as a lesbian in 2010, with giving him the confidence to come out. Another inspiration to Herndon was hearing Carrie Underwood's "So Small" on radio.

Herndon's announcement preceded the coming out of several other gay musicians in the genre, such as Billy Gilman. Herndon noted that his fan base was largely supportive of him after his announcement. Herndon and Wright have performed together at benefit concerts for GLAAD on multiple occasions. In 2016, Herndon and CMT presenter Cody Alan founded the Concert for Love and Acceptance, an annual concert to support LGBT youth in Nashville. In February 2023, Herndon became engaged to Alex Schwartz, whom he had been dating for six months prior. They married on August 27, 2023.

== Discography ==
Studio albums

- What Mattered Most (1995)
- Living in a Moment (1996)
- Big Hopes (1998)
- Steam (1999)
- Right About Now (2007)
- Journey On (2010)
- Lies I Told Myself (2013)
- House on Fire (2016)
- Got It Covered (2019)
- Jacob (2022)
- THIRTY, Vol. 1 (2025)
