= Stephanie Bentley =

American country music artist

- Born: Stephanie Kay Bentley; April 29, 1963 (age 63); Thomasville, Georgia, U.S.
- Origin: Nashville, Tennessee, U.S.
- Genres: Country
- Occupation: Singer-songwriter
- Instrument: Vocals
- Years active: 1992–present
- Labels: Liberty, Epic

Stephanie Kay Bentley (born April 29, 1963) is an American country music artist. She made her debut in 1996 as a duet partner on Ty Herndon's single "Heart Half Empty", which peaked at No. 21 on the Billboard Hot Country Singles & Tracks charts. The single was included both on Herndon's 1995 debut album What Mattered Most and on Bentley's 1996 debut album Hopechest. It produced three more singles for her on the country charts, although only one ("Who's That Girl") reached Top 40.

Bentley found success as a songwriter, having penned Faith Hill's 1999 crossover single "Breathe", as well as Martina McBride's 2002 Top 5 hit "Concrete Angel". She has also co-written album cuts for Céline Dion, Pam Tillis and Jo Dee Messina, and recorded "I Will Survive" for the 2003 film Holes and "Don't It Feel Good" for the 2005 film Must Love Dogs.

== Biography ==
=== Early life ===
Bentley was born in Thomasville, Georgia and her musical interests began at age nine, when she, her sister, and a friend entered and won a talent contest. The three later toured briefly as a musical group, even singing for President Jimmy Carter, In 1984, she formed a band called Special Delivery.

=== Move to Tennessee ===
In 1991, she moved to Nashville, Tennessee, where she worked as a demo singer. One of the songs for which she sang a demo was "Shake the Sugar Tree", which later became a Top 5 hit when Pam Tillis recorded it for her 1992 album Homeward Looking Angel. Bentley's demo vocals were dubbed into Tillis' recording of the song.

=== 1995–1997: Ty Herndon duet and Hopechest ===
After a failed deal with Liberty Records which produced no albums or singles, Bentley signed to Epic Records in 1995. Her first chart entry in 1996 was as a duet partner on Ty Herndon's single "Heart Half Empty", (from his debut album What Mattered Most) which peaked at No. 21 on the Billboard Hot Country Singles & Tracks charts. "Heart Half Empty" was followed by her first solo release for Epic, "Who's That Girl", which peaked at No. 32. This was the first single from her debut album Hopechest, issued by Epic that year. The album produced three more singles after "Who's That Girl", although these latter three singles—"Once I Was the Light of Your Life", "The Hopechest Song" and "Dead Ringer"—all failed to make Top 40.

=== 1997–present: Songwriting ===
Although Bentley never charted or recorded an album after 1997, she found success writing songs for others, most notably "Breathe" by Faith Hill, which spent six weeks at the top of the Billboard country music charts in late 1999-early 2000 and became the Number One song of 2000 on the Billboard Hot 100 year-end countdown. Bentley also co-wrote Lorrie Morgan's 1998 single "I'm Not That Easy to Forget" with George Teren and Chris Waters and Martina McBride's 2002 single "Concrete Angel" with Rob Crosby. In addition, she wrote two singles for Gloriana: "Wild at Heart" in 2009 with Josh Kear and Matt Serletic, and "Can't Shake You" in 2012 with Tom Gossin and James T. Slater. Bentley also contributed the songs "I Will Survive" for the soundtrack of the 2003 film Holes and "Don't It Feel Good" for the soundtrack of the 2005 film Must Love Dogs.

== Discography ==
=== Studio albums ===
Title	Album details	Peak positions
Title	Album details	US Country
Hopechest	Release date: January 9, 1996; Label: Epic Records	60

=== Singles ===
Year	Single	Peak positions		Album
Year	Single	US Country	CAN Country	Album
1995	"Heart Half Empty" (Ty Herndon with Stephanie Bentley)	21	12	What Mattered Most / Hopechest
1996	"Who's That Girl"	32	31	Hopechest
1996	"Once I Was the Light of Your Life"	60	—	Hopechest
1996	"Dead Ringer"	—	—	Hopechest
1997	"The Hopechest Song"	47	—	Hopechest
"—" denotes releases that did not chart

=== Music videos ===
Year	Video	Director
1996	"Heart Half Empty" (Ty Herndon with Stephanie Bentley)	Steven Goldmann
1996	"Who's That Girl"	Steven Goldmann
1997	"The Hopechest Song"	Tara Johns
