= Gary Burr =

American musician (born 1952)

- Born: 1952 (age 73–74)
- Origin: Meriden, Connecticut, U.S.
- Genres: Country, rock
- Occupations: Singer-songwriter, record producer
- Instruments: Vocals, guitar, bass, piano
- Years active: 1982–present
- Website: www.garyburr.com

Gary Burr (born 1952 in Meriden, Connecticut) is an American musician, songwriter, and record producer, primarily in the country music genre. Many of the songs he has written have become Top-10 hits, the first of which was "Love's Been A Little Bit Hard On Me" released by Juice Newton (#7 on Billboard's Hot 100) in 1982. He became a member of the group Pure Prairie League (1984 to 1985), taking over after Vince Gill departed the group. Burr later moved to Nashville to focus on his songwriting career, though he has continued performing and is currently a member of the Blue Sky Riders. He has written and co-written songs for many country artists (The Oak Ridge Boys, Reba McEntire, Patty Loveless, etc.), and a few songs for Pop and Rock artists (Juice Newton, Lynyrd Skynyrd, and Lisa Loeb).

== Songs written/co-written by Gary Burr ==
- "Rainy Day Man" – Joey Molland
- “I Was Here” - Lady A
- "The Time Machine" – Collin Raye
- "Wrong Again" – Mindy McCready
- "Love's Been a Little Bit Hard on Me" – Juice Newton
- "Walkin' Into Trouble" – Juice Newton
- "Make My Life With You" – The Oak Ridge Boys
- "I Try to Think About Elvis" – Patty Loveless
- "A Thousand Times a Day" – Patty Loveless
- "Up and Flying" – Reba McEntire
- "I Wear Your Love"- Kathy Mattea
- "Bus Ride"- Suzy Bogguss
- "Can't Be Really Gone" – Tim McGraw
- "To Be Loved by You" – Wynonna
- "Cover to Cover" – Billy Ray Cyrus
- "More Love" – Doug Stone
- "Too Busy Being in Love" – Doug Stone
- "Small Steps" – Doug Stone
- "What's in It for Me" – John Berry
- "Man of My Word" – Collin Raye
- "Burned Like a Rocket" – Billy Joe Royal
- "That's My Job" – Conway Twitty
- "The Vows Go Unbroken (Always True to You)" – Kenny Rogers
- "Watch Me" – Lorrie Morgan
- "Sure Love" – Hal Ketchum
- "Salvation" - John Berry
- "In a Week or Two" – Diamond Rio
- "One Night a Day" – Garth Brooks
- "We Don't Have to Do This" – Tanya Tucker
- "Where Was I" – Ricky Van Shelton
- "Till You Love Me" – Reba McEntire
- "One Last Good Hand"- Reba McEntire
- "What Mattered Most" – Ty Herndon
- "Heart Half Empty" – Ty Herndon & Stephanie Bentley
- "On the Side of Angels" – LeAnn Rimes
- "Nothin' 'Bout Love Makes Sense" – LeAnn Rimes
- "Bottle" – LeAnn Rimes
- "I Already Do" – Chely Wright
- "It Was" – Chely Wright
- "Everything" – Chely Wright
- "A Man Ain't Made of Stone" – Randy Travis
- "Out of My Bones" – Randy Travis
- "You Made Me That Way" – Andy Griggs
- "This Is the Night" – Clay Aiken
- "Before Your Love" – Kelly Clarkson
- "Nobody Wants to Be Lonely" – Ricky Martin & Christina Aguilera
- "Tomorrow's Goodbye" – Lynyrd Skynyrd
- "Todo" – Alejandra Guzmán
- "Just Around the Eyes" – Faith Hill
- "I Would Be Stronger Than That" – Faith Hill
- "Outside My Window" – Sarah Buxton
- "In the Meantime" — Sarah Marince
- "Learning To Live With Me" – Gary Allan
- "Always Something To Believe In" – Malea McGuinness
- "Younger" – Joe Cocker
- "In Front Of The Alamo" – Hal Ketchum
- "Standing Still" – Ringo Starr
- "Love Is" – Ringo Starr
- "Loving You Forever" – Carole King
- "Wise Beyond Her Tears" – Kim Hill
- "Back In Your Kitchen" - Tommy Shaw
- "Shadows In The Moonlight" - Tommy Shaw
- "Cavalry" - Tommy Shaw
- Title song and 3 others on "How About Now" - Kenny Loggins
- "Faster Gun" - Great Plains
- "A Small Word" - Emma Wilson
- "Watching You Leave" - Emma Wilson on "Memphis Calling"

== As producer ==
Burr has produced a number of songs and albums, including the Disney Records album The Best of Country Sing the Best of Disney, and Olivia Newton-John's Back with a Heart.

== U.S. Senate Testimony ==
Burr gave Testimony to the U.S. Senate as a major American songwriter in November 2005 concerning audio/video piracy (specifically from China) on behalf of himself and the RIAA.

== Blue Sky Riders ==
Burr is a member of Blue Sky Riders, a country music trio also featuring Kenny Loggins and Georgia Middleman (whom he married in 2012). They released their debut album, Finally Home, on January 29, 2013.
