= Doug Johnson (music producer) =

American record producer and songwriter

- Born: Swainsboro, Georgia, United States
- Origin: Nashville, Tennessee, United States
- Genres: Country
- Occupations: Songwriter, record producer
- Years active: early 1980s-present

Doug Johnson (born in Swainsboro, Georgia) is an American record producer and songwriter. He began in the 1970s working as an engineer and mixer for the Lowery Group. His first production credit was for The Burch Sisters, an act that signed with Mercury Nashville in 1988. A year later, Johnson helped Doug Stone secure a contract with Epic Records. While at Epic, Johnson became the vice president of A&R, helping the label to sign Patty Loveless while producing for Ty Herndon, John Michael Montgomery, and others. Johnson also assembled the members of the Gibson/Miller Band, which recorded two albums for Epic. He was promoted to senior vice president of the label in 1994, then moved to Giant Records in 1997, becoming president of that label. Johnson also produces and co-writes for Lee Brice.

Johnson has also written more than 40 songs, including Randy Travis's "Three Wooden Crosses", which won the Academy of Country Music and Country Music Association Song of the Year award.
