= Listen to Your Heart =

Listen to Your Heart may refer to:

== Film and television ==
- Listen to Your Heart (1983 film), an American romantic comedy
- Listen to Your Heart (2010 film), an American romantic drama
- The Bachelor Presents: Listen to Your Heart, an American dating reality television series

== Music ==
- Listen to Your Heart (album), by DHT, 2005
- "Listen to Your Heart" (Lisa Stansfield song), 1983
- "Listen to Your Heart" (Roxette song), 1988; covered by DHT, 2004
- "Listen to Your Heart" (Sonia song), 1989
- "Listen to Your Heart", a song by Alicia Keys from Girl on Fire, 2012
- "Listen to Your Heart", a song by Little River Band from Get Lucky, 1990
- "Listen to Your Heart", a song by Motörhead from Overnight Sensation, 1996
- "Listen to Your Heart", a song by the Maine from Black & White, 2010
- "Listen to Your Heart", a song by Rui En, 2003

== See also ==
- "Ascolta il tuo cuore" (lit. "Listen to your heart"), a 1997 song by Laura Pausini
- "Listen to Your Heartbeat", a song by Friends, representing Sweden at Eurovision 2001
- "Stop, Look, Listen (To Your Heart)", a 1971 song by the Stylistics; covered by Marvin Gaye and Diana Ross, 1974
- Listen to My Heart (disambiguation)
