= Listen to Your Heart (album) =

Studio album by DHT
- Released: July 19, 2005
- Recorded: 2003–2005
- Genre: Eurodance; trance
- Length: 45:38 (standard version)
- Label: Robbins
- Producer: Serge Ramaekers; Bart Wierzbicki

Singles from Listen to Your Heart
- 1. "Listen to Your Heart" Released: November 30, 2003; 2. "My Dream" Released: 2004; 3. "Driver's Seat" Released: 2005; 4. "Someone" Released: 2006; 5. "I Go Crazy" Released: 2006; 6. "I Miss You" Released: 2007

Professional ratings
Review scores
Source	Rating
AllMusic	link

Listen to Your Heart is Belgian band DHT's 2005 debut album. It produced the singles "Listen to Your Heart" (a cover of the Roxette song), "My Dream", "Driver's Seat" (a cover of the Sniff 'n' the Tears song), "Someone", "I Go Crazy" (a cover of the Paul Davis song) and "I Miss You". Also covered is "I Can't Be Your Friend", originally recorded by the short-lived country music band Rushlow on their 2003 album Right Now, while "At Seventeen" was previously recorded by Janis Ian.

Flor Theeuwes wrote in the album booklet that the band wanted to record several different mixes of each song: "If you only have one mix of a song, it's easy to put it on an album but, in our case, we spent hours deciding which mix to use on the album." A video for "My Dream" was also made in collaboration with Amnesty International.

== Personnel ==
- Edmée Daenen (Edmée) - lead vocals
- Flor Theeuwes (Da Rick) - arranger, producer, piano, keyboard, programming, backing vocals
- Jeffrey Vissers - arranger, producer
- Serge Ramaekers - arranger, producer
- Jan Vervloet (Thunder Deejay) - arranger, producer
- Tommy Debie (Da Boy Tommy) - arranger, producer
- Bart Wierzbicki - arranger, producer
- Marc Cortens – guitar
- Karl Stroobants – violin
- Giuseppe D. – drum machine, programming

== Singles ==
- "Listen to Your Heart" (2003/2004)

Billboard Hot 100: #8 US (Platinum), Adult Contemporary: #6, Hot Dance Airplay: #1, Hot Digital Songs: #9, Top 40 Mainstream: #1, #7 UK, #7 France, #10 Netherlands, #11 Australia, #12 Ireland, #13 Denmark, #19 Norway, #100 Switzerland, #1 Spain (Dance Chart)

- "My Dream" (2004)

Belgium (FLA): #39

- "Driver's Seat" (2005)

Belgium (FLA): #33

- "Someone" (2006)

Hot Dance Singles Sales: #15

- "I Go Crazy" (2006)

US Pop 100 Airplay: #47, #56 Netherlands, #77 France

- "I Miss You" (2007)

Did not chart

== Track listing ==
=== Standard, US and Australian editions ===
Released in 2005 by Robins Entertainment in the US and the Ministry of Sound in Australia.

1. "Listen to Your Heart" (Furious F.EZ Radio Edit) – 3:11 (Australia)/3:48 (international/US)
2. "I Go Crazy" – 3:44
3. "At Seventeen" – 4:08
4. "I Miss You" – 3:52
5. "Someone" – 3:13
6. "Driver's Seat" – 2:51
7. "I Can't Be Your Friend" – 4:08
8. "My Dream" – 3:54
9. "Sun" – 3:09
10. "Why" – 3:20
11. "Depressed" – 5:30
12. "Listen to Your Heart" (Edmée's Unplugged Vocal Edit) – 3:46 (Australia)/4:28 (international/US)

=== Belgian edition ===
Released in 2005 by Impart Productions bvba.

1. "Listen to Your Heart" (Furious E.Z. Radio Edit) – 3:50
2. "I Go Crazy" – 3:44
3. "At Seventeen" – 4:08
4. "I Miss You" – 3:52
5. "Someone" – 3:13
6. "Driver's Seat" (Unplugged) – 2:51
7. "I Can't Be Your Friend" – 4:08
8. "My Dream" (Easy Dream Mix) – 3:54
9. "Sun" (Tuh Duhduh Tuh Tuh) – 3:09
10. "Why" (Jan Vervloet Club Edit) – 3:20
11. "Depressed" (Jaque LA Moose Remix) – 5:32
12. "Listen to Your Heart" (Edmée's Unplugged Vocal Edit) – 4:29

=== Unplugged edition ===
Released in 2006 by Impart Productions bvba and Universal Records.

1. "Listen to Your Heart" (Edmée's Unplugged Vocal Edit) – 4:30
2. "I Go Crazy" – 3:44
3. "At Seventeen" (Unplugged) – 4:29
4. "I Miss You" (Ballade) – 4:11
5. "Someone" (Unplugged) – 3:51
6. "Driver's Seat" (Unplugged) – 2:51
7. "I Can't Be Your Friend" (Guitar Session) – 3:03
8. "My Dream" (Easy Dream Mix) – 3:54
9. "Sun" (On the Beach) – 3:17
10. "Why" (Unplugged) – 3:22
11. "What If?" – 3:36

=== Dance edition ===
Released in 2006 by Impart Productions.

1. "Listen to Your Heart" (Hardbounze Single Edit) – 3:29
2. "I Go Crazy" (Hardbounze Edit) – 4:09
3. "At Seventeen" – 4:08
4. "I Miss You" (Furious F. Single Edit) – 4:02
5. "Someone" (DHT UK Edit) – 3:06
6. "Driver's Seat" (Hardbounze Single Edit) – 3:20
7. "I Can't Be Your Friend" (Harbounze Single Edit) – 3:34
8. "My Dream" (Wirzbicky Trance Edit) – 3:37
9. "Sun" (Tuh Duhduh Tuh Tuh) – 3:09
10. "Why" (Furious F. Single Edit) – 3:22
11. "Depressed" (Jacques LA Moose Remix) – 5:32

=== Japanese edition ===
Released in 2006 by Exit Tunes.

1. "Listen to Your Heart" (Furious F. Ez Radio Edit) – 3:48
2. "I Go Crazy" – 3:44
3. "At Seventeen" – 4:08
4. "I Miss You" – 3:52
5. "Someone" – 3:11
6. "Driver's Seat" – 2:52
7. "I Can't Be Your Friend" – 4:08
8. "My Dream" – 3:53
9. "Sun" – 3:09
10. "Why" – 3:20
11. "Depressed" – 5:32
12. "Listen to Your Heart" (Edmée's Unplugged Vocal Edit) – 4:28
13. "Listen to Your Heart" (DJ Uto Radio Edit) – 4:11
14. "Listen to Your Heart" (DJ Joker's Harmony Mix Radio Edit) – 4:13
15. "Listen to Your Heart" (DJ Manian Remix Radio Edit) – 3:12
16. "Listen to Your Heart" (Friday Night Posse Remix Radio Edit) – 4:34
17. "Listen to Your Heart" (Rob Mayth Remix Radio Edit) – 3:40

== International versions ==
- On the Unplugged version, "Depressed" is replaced with "What If".
- The Japanese version features the following remixes:
  - "Listen to Your Heart" (DJ Uto Remix Radio Edit) – 4:11
  - "Listen to Your Heart" (DJ Joker's Remix Radio Edit) – 4:13
  - "Listen to Your Heart" (DJ Manian Remix Radio Edit) – 3:12
  - "Listen to Your Heart" (Friday Night Posse Remix Radio Edit) – 4:34
  - "Listen to Your Heart" (Rob Mayth Remix Radio Edit) – 3:40

== Other versions ==
On August 12, 2006, the album was reissued under the title Listen to Your Heart [Dance & Unplugged] (2-disc version).

== Charts ==
Chart performance for Listen to Your Heart
Chart (2005)	Peak position
French Albums (SNEP)	53
US Billboard 200	78
US Top Dance/Electronic Albums	2
