= Right Now (Rushlow album) =

Studio album by Rushlow
- Released: December 9, 2003
- Genre: Country
- Label: Lyric Street
- Producer: Jeff Balding, Christy DiNapoli, Tim Rushlow

Professional ratings
Review scores
Source	Rating
Country Standard Time	link
Country Weekly	link

Right Now is the only studio album by American country music band Rushlow, a band fronted by former Little Texas vocalist Tim Rushlow. Right Now produced two singles for the band on the Hot Country Songs charts: "I Can't Be Your Friend" at #16 and "Sweet Summer Rain" at #42. Additionally, the title track was later recorded by Dean Miller on his 2005 album Platinum. "I Can't Be Your Friend" was covered by DHT on their 2005 album Listen to Your Heart.

The members of Rushlow parted ways in 2003, although Rushlow and acoustic guitarist/banjoist Doni Harris, who is Rushlow's cousin, reunited in 2006 to form a duo called Rushlow Harris. The duo released two singles for Show Dog Nashville that year.

== Track listing ==
No.	Title	Writer(s)	Length
1.	"Right Now"	Dean Miller, Danny Orton	3:18
2.	"However"	Steve Wariner, John Wilson	3:41
3.	"Sweet Summer Rain"	Jim Collins, Orton	3:41
4.	"God Only Knows"	Tim Rushlow	5:52
5.	"I Can't Be Your Friend"	Brad Crisler, Rodney Clawson	3:22
6.	"Still"	John Bettis, Orton	3:18
7.	"Texas Is My Kind of Town"	Rushlow, Brett Warren	3:41
8.	"Since When"	Connie Harrington, John Paul White	3:29
9.	"When You Dance with Me"	Brett James, Crisler	4:05
10.	"She's Out There"	Troy Johnson, James LeBlanc	3:59
11.	"Speechless"	Rushlow	3:44

== Personnel ==
=== Rushlow ===
- Kurt Allison – acoustic guitar, electric guitar, background vocals
- Doni Harris – acoustic guitar, banjo, background vocals
- Tully Kennedy – bass guitar, background vocals
- Rich Redmond – drums
- Tim Rushlow – lead vocals, acoustic guitar, electric guitar
- Billy Welch – keyboards

=== Additional musicians ===
- Bruce Bouton – steel guitar
- Eric Darken – percussion
- Stuart Duncan – fiddle, mandolin
- Carl Gorodetzky - string arrangements
- Dann Huff – electric guitar
- B. James Lowry – acoustic guitar
- Brent Mason – electric guitar
- Rob Mathes – string arrangements
- Nashville String Machine – strings
- Steve Nathan – keyboards
- Jimmy Nichols – keyboards, background vocals
- John Willis – acoustic guitar, banjo
