= At Seventeen =

- Artwork for the US vinyl single

Single by Janis Ian

from the album Between the Lines
- B-side: "Stars"; "Applause"
- Released: July 1975
- Recorded: September 17, 1974
- Studio: 914 Sound Studios
- Genre: Pop; soft rock
- Length: 4:43 (Album version); 3:56 (Remix Single version)
- Label: Columbia
- Songwriter: Janis Ian
- Producer: Brooks Arthur

Janis Ian singles chronology
"When the Party's Over" (1975)	"At Seventeen" (1975)	"In the Winter" (1975)

Official audio
- "At Seventeen" on YouTube

"At Seventeen" is a song by American singer-songwriter Janis Ian from her seventh studio album Between the Lines. Columbia released it in July 1975 as the album's second single. Ian wrote the lyrics on the basis of a New York Times article and used a samba instrumental, and Brooks Arthur produced the final version. A pop and soft rock ballad, the song is about a social outcast in high school. Critics have regarded "At Seventeen" as a type of anthem. Despite her initial reluctance to perform the single live, Ian promoted it at various appearances and it has been included on compilation and live albums.

Critics praised "At Seventeen", which earned Ian the Grammy Award for Best Female Pop Vocal Performance, and Grammy nominations for Record and Song of the Year. The single reached number three on the Billboard Hot 100 chart, and had sold over a million copies as of August 2004. Internationally, "At Seventeen" charted in Australia, Canada, and New Zealand. It is one of Ian's most commercially successful songs, considered by critics her signature song. "At Seventeen" has been used frequently in television and films, like The Simpsons and Mean Girls; it has also been referenced in literature. Various recording artists and musicians, including Anita Kerr, Jann Arden, and Celine Dion, have covered "At Seventeen". The Hong Kong all-female band at17 named themselves after it in 2002.

== Background and recording ==
"At Seventeen" was written by Janis Ian at the age of 23 and produced by Brooks Arthur. She was inspired to write the single after reading an article in The New York Times about a young woman who thought her life would improve after a debutante ball and her subsequent disappointment when it did not. In the article the girl was 18, but Ian changed it to 17 to fit with her samba guitar instrumental. She recalled feeling uncomfortable while writing "At Seventeen" as it predated the confessional song trend of the 1970s. She was also uncertain about writing about high school when she had never experienced a homecoming or a prom. She said she purposely took her time with the song to ensure it did not lose its "intensity"; she repeatedly stopped and started work on it over the course of three months. At the time, she was living with her mother.

During the recording process, which Ian described as "very tense", she worried she had accidentally stolen the melody from a different song and consulted three friends about it. Arthur described the song as "just honest and straight from her heart", and felt it was different from folk or pop music. He said Ian was easy to work with as she had prepared by bringing lyric sheets and arrangements to the studio sessions. Arthur and Ian had worked together on her 1966 single "Society's Child", during which they formed a close friendship. "At Seventeen" was completed in roughly two or three days at 914 Sound Studios; it was recorded on September 17, 1974. The final version contains two combined takes, as the initial ending was deemed too weak compared to its start. Allen Klein listened in during a session and responded positively to the song. Brooks Arthur, Larry Alexander, and Russ Payne were the audio engineers for "At Seventeen".

== Composition and lyrics ==
"At Seventeen"
Critics have described "At Seventeen" as bossa nova, pop rock, jazz, and blues. Ian originally wrote the song while playing a samba instrumental on her guitar.

"At Seventeen" is composed in the key of C major using common time and a moderate tempo of 126 beats per minute. Instrumentation is provided by a piano and a guitar. During the track, Ian's vocal range spans from the low note of G_{3} to the high note of A♭_{4}. Some commentators connected the song to bossa nova. Mix magazine's Gary Eskow cited Ian's style as the opposite of Antônio Carlos Jobim's because she "explore[d] the belly of the bossa, the flip side of Ipanema". John Lissner of The New York Times referred to the instrumental as having a "laid-back bossa nova beat" and ostinato. On the other hand, AllMusic's Lindsay Planer referred to "At Seventeen" as a mixture of pop rock, jazz, and blues, and music scholar James E. Perone associated it more with jazz and a "coffeehouse folksinger" approach. Perone described the song's style as more restrained compared to Ian's contemporaries. A writer for Rolling Stone magazine associated "At Seventeen" with "sulk-pop".

"At Seventeen" is a pop and soft rock ballad about being a social outcast in high school, particularly with respect to adolescent cruelty and rejection. The lyrics focus on the conflict between cliques as represented by the contrast of "ravaged faces" and "clear-skinned smiles". The song opens with the line "I learned the truth at seventeen, that love was meant for beauty queens". The narrator reveals in the third verse that she finds herself unattractive ("Those of us with ravaged faces"), but later provides a more hopeful outlook through an "Ugly Duckling" allusion ("Ugly duckling girls like me"). Ian said "The Ugly Duckling" lyric was partially inspired by Billie Holiday, who described her music as always containing a sense of hope. Ian wrote the last verse ("To those of us who knew the pain / of valentines that never came") to connect directly with the listener. Other lyrics include homebound social outcasts' pastimes like "cheat ourselves at solitaire / inventing lovers on the phone / repenting other lives unknown", and remembering "The valentines I never knew / the Friday night charades of youth."

Some commentators viewed "At Seventeen" as a type of anthem. Melissa Etheridge and Billboard's Patrick Crowley interpreted the song as a gay anthem. Crowley equated the awkwardness described in the lyrics to the confusion over one's sexual orientation. Etheridge interpreted the line ("I learned the truth at seventeen") as discovering one's homosexuality. Ian has said she was initially surprised at the LGBT support given to the song. NPR included "At Seventeen" in its 2018 series on American anthems.

== Release and promotion ==
=== Release ===
Ian's manager and CBS felt the song was too long, and CBS was uncertain how to market a song with so many lyrics. Producer Herb Gart had suggested that "When the Party's Over" be released as the lead single from Ian's seventh studio album Between the Lines rather than "At Seventeen". He reasoned that radio personalities would choose "At Seventeen" as the better single and feel smarter than the record label. Alternatively, Arthur thought "When the Party's Over" was a more appropriate choice. Gart asked radio stations to play only the first sixty seconds of "At Seventeen" followed by an advertisement for the song to encourage people to call in and request the rest. Ian said that Gart's promotional strategies were successful.

"At Seventeen" was first released in July 1975. It was made available as a 7 inch single on November 20, 1976, through Columbia; "Stars" and "Applause" were used as B-sides on two separate single releases. The album version was four minutes and forty-three seconds long, and the single version was cut down to three minutes and fifty-six seconds. On February 14, 1977, (Valentine's Day), Ian was sent 461 Valentine's Day cards in reference to the lyric ("Of valentines that never came"). She has subsequently included "At Seventeen" on compilation albums. A remastered version of Between the Lines, including "At Seventeen", has also been made available; on August 4, 2014, Ian released an acoustic version of "At Seventeen" through her label Rude Girl Records.

=== Live performances ===
Ian was initially hesitant to perform the single live, describing it as deeply personal and fearing public ridicule. She closed her eyes while singing it for the first six months because she was afraid the audience would laugh at her. She later said that the frank lyrics encouraged pathos from the listeners. Ian went on a promotional tour for the single and performed at small shows for almost half a year. These appearances included a British morning show where Queen was promoting their 1975 single "Bohemian Rhapsody". In the beginning, Ian toured with a drummer, bass player, and her tour manager. Ian said she knew the song was successful when the size of the audience grew from 100 to 800. Ian sang "At Seventeen" on Saturday Night Live's first episode on October 11, 1975, and the following year, she performed it on The Old Grey Whistle Test at the Shepherd's Bush BBC Television Theatre. She also sang it on an episode of The Tonight Show, with guest host Steve Lawrence.

Ian and Howard Stern performed a parody of the single to spoof then 38-year-old Jerry Seinfeld's relationship with high school senior Shoshana Lonstein at the Miss Howard Stern New Year's Eve Pageant on December 31, 1993. Revised lyrics included "can't he get an older girl". She performed the song as part of the Women in Music: 1960-1999 concert, aired by MTV in 1999. Ian performed a science fiction version of the song, entitled "Welcome Home (The Nebulous Song)," at a banquet for the 2008 Nebula Awards. The version included references to science fiction authors and publications. Ian sang "At Seventeen" for the 2016 Lincoln Center for the Performing Arts' American Songbook series and the 2018 Cambridge Folk Festival. The same year, she recorded an acoustic version to include on the app for Wally Lamb's novel I'll Take You There; it included a soundtrack containing eight songs, including "At Seventeen". Some of Ian's performances have been released on live albums.

== Critical reception and accolades ==
"At Seventeen" received a positive response from critics. A contributor for The Jewish Chronicle praised it as "a moving and memorable appraisal of teenage loneliness". Twiggy commended the song for perfectly representing the awkwardness of being a teenager, and compared it to her own experiences growing up. The Advocate's Gina Vivinetto summed up "At Seventeen" as "the best song about growing up female ever written". Brittany Spanos, writing for The Village Voice, attributed the song's success to Ian's intimate delivery of its subject, likening it to Joni Mitchell's fourth studio album Blue (1971). Jeff and Don Breithaupt wrote that the song was "lifted above the level of generic moping by a sharply detailed lyric". John Lissner described "At Seventeen" as "mellow [and] improve[d] with each hearing", along with the songs "When the Party's Over", "From Me to You", and "Bright Lights and Promises". Alternatively, Idolator's Mike Wass criticized "At Seventeen" as a "self-pitying and usually annoying single girl anthem".

Ian received the Grammy Award for Best Female Pop Vocal Performance for "At Seventeen" at the 18th Annual Grammy Awards, and the song was nominated for record and song of the year. She performed the song as part of the ceremony. "At Seventeen" was inducted into the Grammy Hall of Fame in 2008, and is considered Ian's signature song. According to Mike McPadden of VH1, the single had made Ian a "major mainstream folk-rock performer".

== Commercial performance ==
"At Seventeen" peaked at number three on the September 13, 1975, on Billboard Hot 100 chart, and remained on it for twenty weeks. It reached number one on the Adult Contemporary Billboard chart for two weeks in August 1975, and stayed on the chart for fifteen weeks. It also peaked at number one on the Cashbox top 100 chart, and number six on its year-end pop singles chart. On the Billboard Year-End chart, "At Seventeen" ranked number nineteen. It also reached number twenty for pop and number two for easy listening. According to Billboard, the song enjoyed a resurgence in sales after the Grammy Awards in 1976.

"At Seventeen" also appeared on international charts. In Canada, the single peaked at number one on the RPM pop music playlist and number six on the RPM Top Singles chart. On RPM's top two-hundred songs of 1975, it ranked number seventy-one. "At Seventeen" reached number thirty-seven on the New Zealand Singles Chart for the week of October 10, 1975. In Australia, it peaked at number eighteen on the Kent Music Report, and was included at number eighty on the year-end chart.

Ian cited the song's commercial success as making her an example of the American dream. It was her first successful single since "Society's Child", and her biggest success overall. The Register-Guard's Lewis Taylor referred to a 1970s release of "At Seventeen" when Ian was broke, and music critics deemed her music not commercially viable, as the first of many comebacks. As of August 2004, the song has sold over a million copies.

== Use in media ==
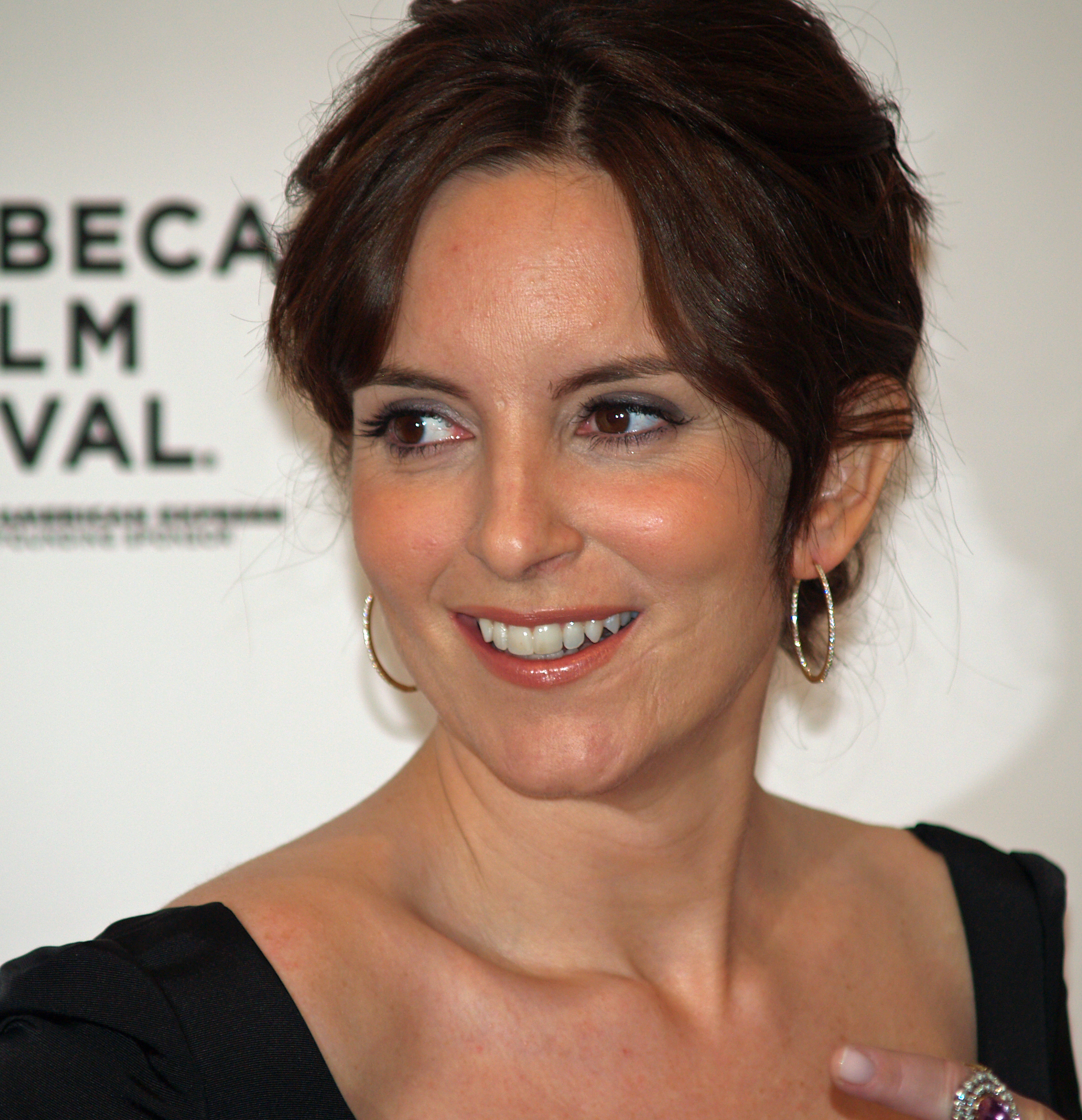
Tina Fey covered the song for a 30 Rock episode; the original version was included in her film Mean Girls.

"At Seventeen" has been a popular choice for film and television soundtracks. It was played in the 2001 film Scotland, PA, an adaptation of the Shakespeare play Macbeth. The character Donald Duncan, portrayed by Geoff Dunsworth, is shown listening to the single in a scene Professor Jennifer Drouin interpreted as indicative of his queer identity. The song can be heard in the background of a scene in the 2004 film Mean Girls. Some critics felt it represented the character named Janis Ian. Liz Lemon (portrayed by Tina Fey) performed a karaoke version of "At Seventeen" in a season one episode of 30 Rock. The A.V. Club's Erik Adams described the scene as a callback to Fey's work on Mean Girls. "At Seventeen" was included in the 2013 film Blood Ties. Stephen Holden, writing for The New York Times, criticized the song's placement in the film, and believed it belonged in "a softer and gentler movie" instead. It is also featured in the first season of The End of the F***ing World, the fifth season of The Blacklist, and in anti-bullying advertisements.

The single was featured in three episodes of The Simpsons: "A Streetcar Named Marge", "El Viaje Misterioso de Nuestro Jomer", and "Chief of Hearts". In "A Streetcar Named Marge", the lyrics are changed to describe the contestants of a beauty pageant. The A.V. Club's Nathan Rabin cited the scene as representative of the episode's satire on "loneliness and despair [transformed] into crowd-pleasing entertainment through wildly inappropriate showmanship". In "El Viaje Misterioso de Nuestro Jomer", the song is used during Homer Simpson's search for a soulmate. Sarah Oliver of The A.V. Club felt it reflected the character's melancholy.

Janis Ian appeared in the series finale of the HBO series Getting On, playing the character of a patient named Mrs. Belfontaine, and sang excerpts from "At Seventeen", among other songs.

"At Seventeen" has also been referenced in literature. It was named in Jeffrey Eugenides' 1993 novel The Virgin Suicides, where four girls imprisoned in their own homes use it and other songs to communicate with the narrator and his friends. Orson Scott Card titled his short story "Inventing Lovers on the Phone" from a line of "At Seventeen". Ian said that Card's work had inspired her own music, specifically the track "This House" from her 1993 studio album Breaking Silence.

The song is featured in the film Saturday Night, which imagines the lead-up to the first broadcast of Saturday Night Live. Ian is portrayed by Naomi McPherson of the band Muna.

== Formats and track listings ==
- 7-inch single #1
1. "At Seventeen" – 3:56
- 7-inch single #2
1. "At Seventeen" – 3:56
2. "Stars" – 4:41
- 7-inch single #3
1. "At Seventeen" – 4:41
2. "Applause" – 4:00

== Credits and personnel ==
Credits adapted from the liner notes of Between the Lines.

- Acoustic bass – Richard Davis
- Acoustic (steel string) guitar – Janis Ian, Al Gorgoni, David Snider
- Vocals, Arrangement (horns) – Janis Ian
- Drums – Barry Lazarowitz
- Engineer – Brooks Arthur, Larry Alexander, Russ Payne
- Flugelhorn – Burt Collins
- Guitar (nylon) – Sal DeTroia, Janis Ian. Single version also featured Bucky Pizzarelli
- Percussion – Barry Lazarowitz
- Producer – Brooks Arthur
- Trombone – Alan Raph
- Written by – Janis Ian

== Charts ==
=== Weekly charts ===
Chart (1975)	Peak position
Australia (Kent Music Report)	18
Canada RPM Top Singles	6
Canada RPM Adult Contemporary	1
New Zealand	37
Quebec (ADISQ)	11
US Billboard Hot 100	3
US Billboard Adult Contemporary	1
US Cash Box Top 100	1

=== Year-end charts ===
Chart (1975)	Rank
Australia (Kent Music Report)	80
Canada RPM Top Singles	71
US Billboard Easy Listening	19
US Billboard Hot 100	20
US Billboard Pop	20
US Cash Box Top 100	6

== Release history ==
Country	Date	Format	Label
United States	August 1975	7-inch	Columbia
United States	November 20 1976	7-inch	Columbia
United States	August 4 2014	Digital download	Rude Girl Records

== Cover versions ==
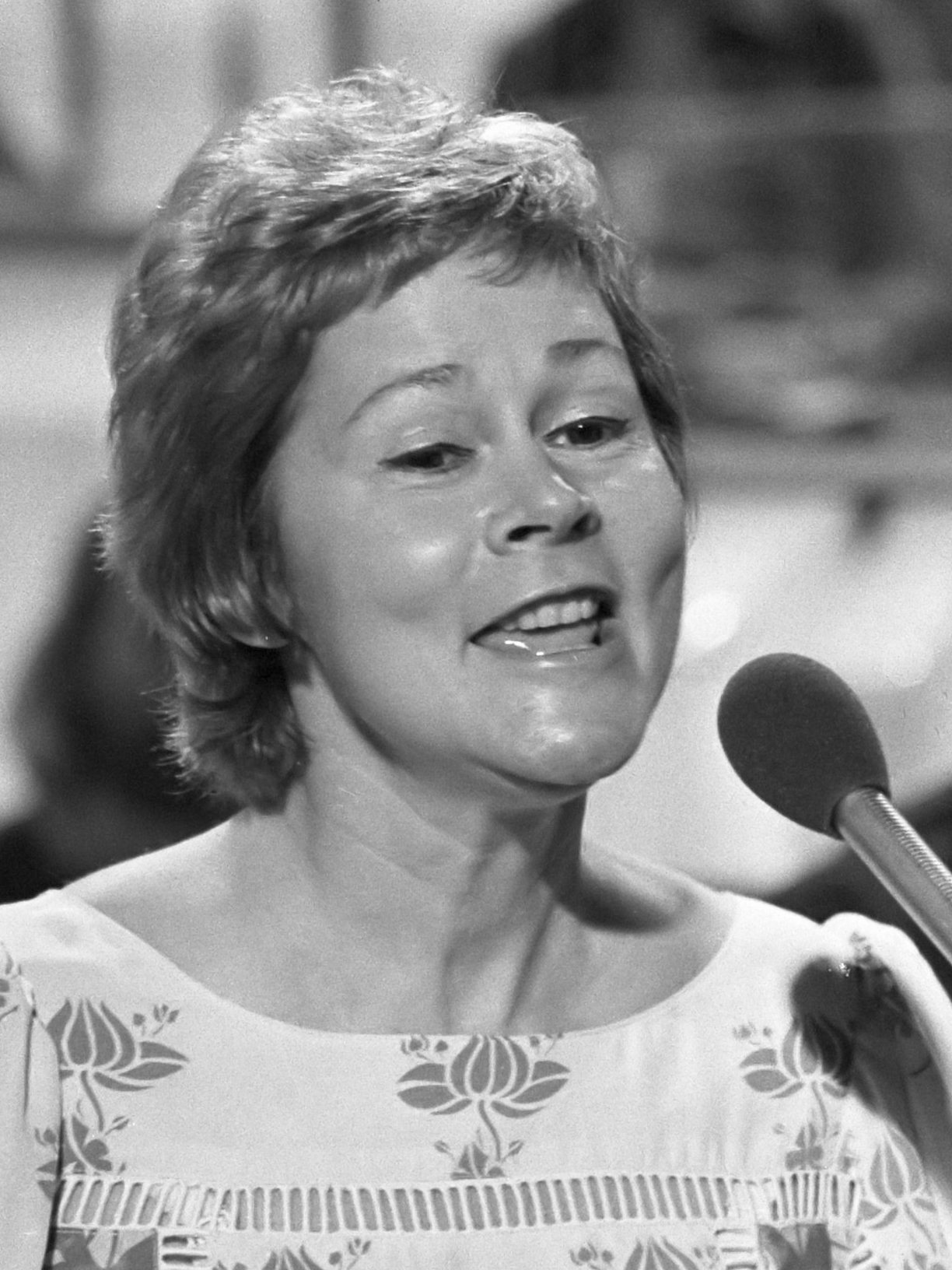
Anita Kerr helped to popularize the song through her 1975 cover.

"At Seventeen" has been covered by various recording artists and musicians. Anita Kerr covered it for her 1975 album The Anita Kerr Singers, which anthropologist Mary A. Bufwack and music reporter Robert K. Oermann attributed to popularizing the song. Claude Francois recorded a French version of the song, titled "17 ans", in 1975, Mireille Mathieu too in 1977 with French lyrics by Eddy Marnay (LP "Sentimentalement vôtre" disque d'or) In 1988, cabaret singer Judith Cohen performed a cover of "At Seventeen" in her shows. Stephen Holden said that her performances of the song Bruce Roberts' "I Don't Break Easily" were "built to strong dramatic climaxes in which a key line abruptly changed the narrative perspective". Tara MacLean recorded the song for the 1999 movie Teaching Mrs. Tingle, and Paul Clinton believed the film's soundtrack added "energy and pacing to the story". Chocolat covered a Yoshinori Sunahara-produced "At Seventeen" for her 1999 second studio album Hamster, which Billboard's Steve McClure described as having a "dark, ambient feel". Ringo Sheena recorded the track "Seventeen" as a tribute to the Janis Ian song; Sheena cited Ian as one of her major influences, particularly for her voice.

The all-female band at17 chose their name partially based on the Janis Ian song. They did a Cantonese version for their 2002 studio album Meow Meow Meow. New Zealand singer Amber Claire released her version of "At Seventeen" as the second single from her 2004 debut album Love and Such. It debuted and peaked at number twenty-eight on the Official New Zealand Music Chart. The same year, Gwyneth Herbert included her rendition on her second studio album Bittersweet and Blue; a reviewer from The Times described the version as "pop angst". DHT covered the song with Edmée Daenen for their debut studio album Listen to Your Heart (2005). AllMusic's David Jeffries enjoyed their cover, and described it as lacking the camp style previously used by the band. Sitti did a cover for her debut studio album Café Bossa (2006), and her live album My Bossa Nova Live! (2008).

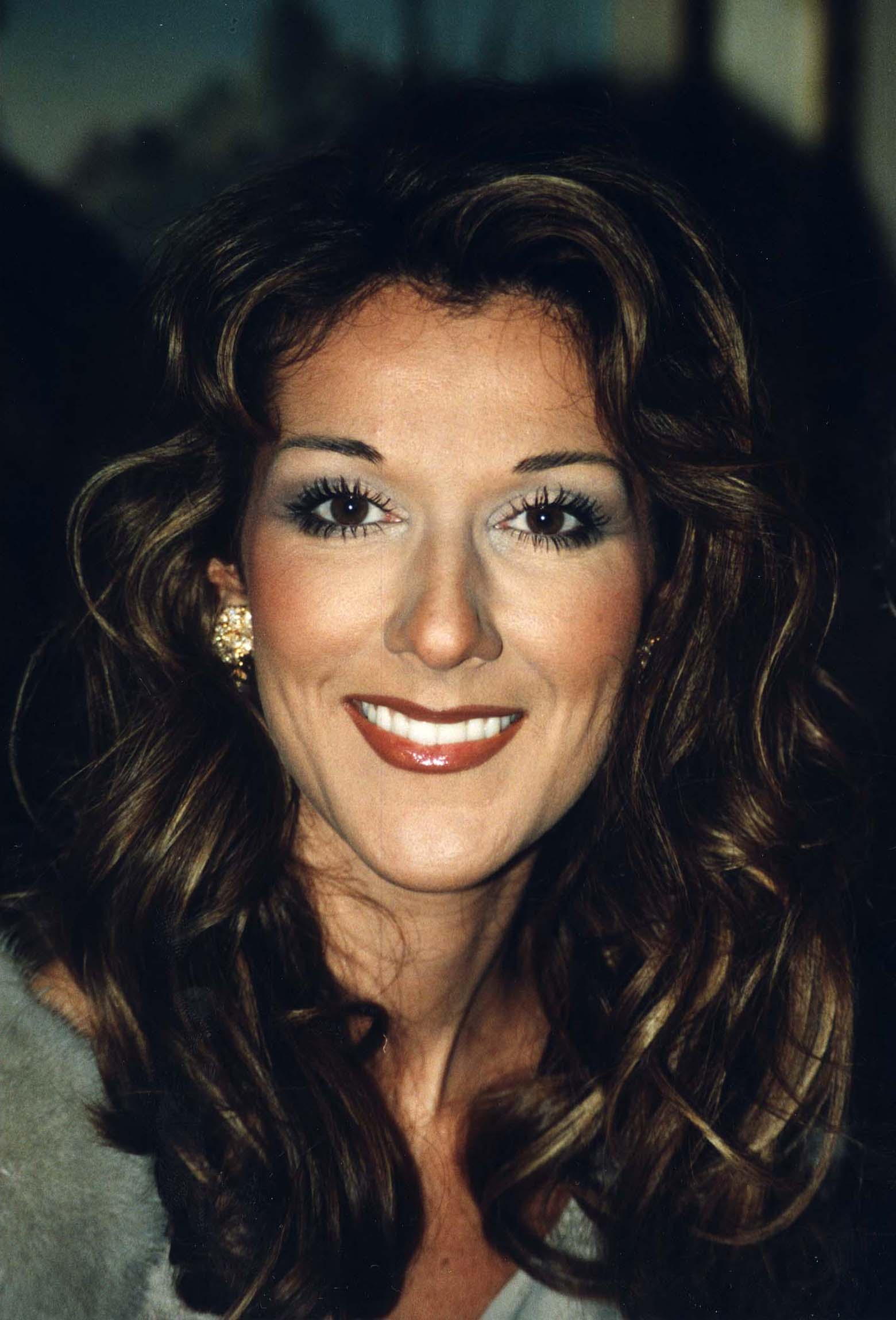
Celine Dion covered "At Seventeen" for her album Loved Me Back to Life and performed it live on multiple occasions.

Producer Kenneth Ehrlich requested Celine Dion perform the song as part of a 2008 Grammy Nominations TV special. For her rendition, Dion sang it with only her band on stage. She included it on her Las Vegas residency show Céline, and recorded a Babyface-produced cover for her eleventh English-language studio album Loved Me Back to Life (2013). According to Steve Morse of the Boston Globe, the album version contains "a light Brazilian feel". Some critics praised Dion's performance, with Slant Magazine's Eric Henderson writing it perfectly represents the singer as a "manic, Hallmark card-brandishing guru of schmaltz". On the other hand, Stephen Erlewine of AllMusic called the cover "thoroughly colorless adult contemporary." Dion also performed "At Seventeen" as part of a medley with her singles "A New Day Has Come" (2002) and "Unison" (1990) for her tour Celine Dion Live 2018.

Carly Rae Jepsen sang "At Seventeen" during the top three of the fifth season of Canadian Idol. Entertainment Weekly's Grady Smith praised her rendition for showcasing her breathy vocals, while Evan Sawdey of PopMatters found it to be unoriginal and tone-deaf. Jann Arden released her cover of "At Seventeen" as a single from her seventh studio album Uncover Me. Arden said that it was the first song she learned to play on the guitar, and identified it as a "perfect coming of age song". AllMusic's Stewart Mason described Arden's take as "downright spooky". The cover peaked at eighty-four on the Canadian Hot 100 Billboard chart on May 5, 2007, and remained on the chart for six weeks. Arden performed "At Seventeen" on her Uncover Me Tour in 2007. She included the live version on her iTunes exclusive extended play (EP) Live Session, released in 2007. In 2008, Regine Velasquez recorded a cover of the song on her fifth cover album Low Key. For the album, she included songs that she wanted to sing since childhood. The same year, Rhonda Burchmore included her rendition of "At Seventeen" on her studio album Pure Imagination. Burchmore chose the song based on what the Herald Sun's Jill Fraser referred to as "a deliberate move to more popstyle songs".

"At Seventeen" is performed as part of the musical I Dreamed a Dream. It was one of several pop covers used to tell the life of Susan Boyle, which Emma Clayton of Telegraph & Argus praised as a smart idea. Maureen McGovern performed the song at the Feinstein's/54 Below as part of a 2015 event celebrating female singer-songwriters. The same year, Alessia Cara included a song entitled "Seventeen" on her EP Four Pink Walls, which the Rolling Stone's Brittany Spanos called a "savvy update" of the Ian original. Saffron Monsoon (portrayed by Julia Sawalha) did a karaoke version of "At Seventeen" in the 2016 film Absolutely Fabulous: The Movie in a bar with drag queens. The version was included on the film's official soundtrack. Rachael Yamagata recorded "At Seventeen", along with other covers, to finance her fourth studio album Tightrope Walker (2016). In 2018, American singer Sarah Partridge covered "At Seventeen" for her album Bright Lights and Promises: Redefining Janis Ian. Partridge recorded her version with a septuple meter.

== See also ==
- List of Billboard Easy Listening number ones of 1975
- List of Cash Box Top 100 number-one singles of 1975
