= Platinum (Dean Miller album) =

Studio album by Dean Miller
- Released: September 6, 2005
- Genre: Country
- Label: Koch
- Producer: Dean Miller

Dean Miller chronology
Dean Miller (1997)	Platinum (2005)

Professional ratings
Review scores
Source	Rating
Allmusic	3.5/5 stars

Platinum is the title of the third studio album recorded, but only the second to be released, by American country music artist Dean Miller. It was released in 2005 on Koch Records. It followed an unreleased second album, Just Me, which he recorded in 2002 for Universal South Records. Platinum produced only one non-charting single prior to the closure of Koch's country division. "I've Been a Long Time Leaving" was written by Miller's father, Roger Miller, and previously recorded by Waylon Jennings on his album Dreaming My Dreams. The track "Right Now" was previously recorded by the short-lived band Rushlow on their 2003 album of the same name.
