= Mick Dyche =

English musical artist (1951–2018)

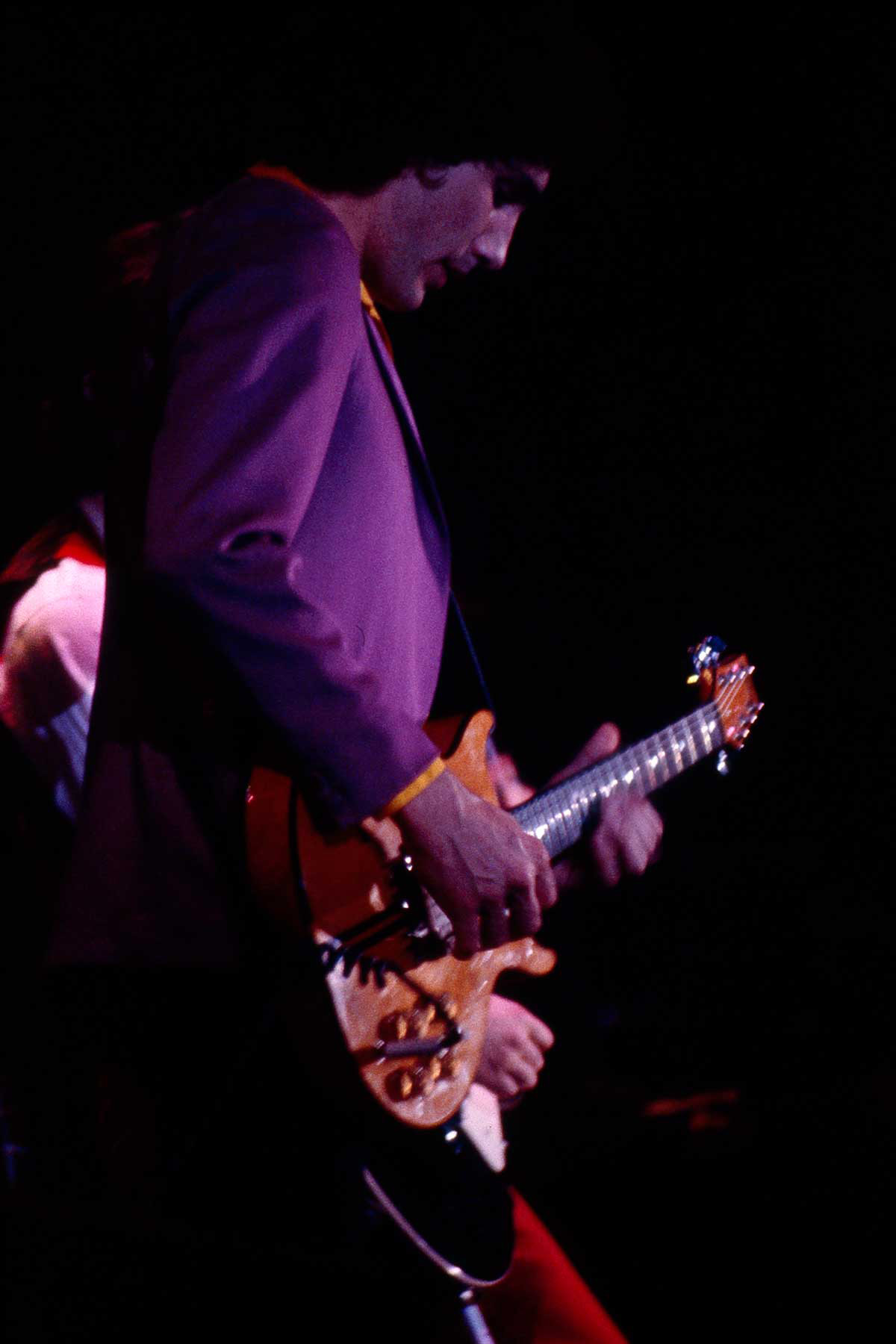
- Mick Dyche in concert, 1979

Background information
- Born: 4 October 1951; Burton upon Trent, Staffordshire, England
- Died: 21 December 2018 (aged 67) Hereford, Herefordshire, England
- Genres: Soft rock, blues-rock, folk-rock
- Occupations: Musician, songwriter
- Instrument: Guitar
- Years active: 1972–2018
- Labels: Atlantic, Chiswick Records
- Formerly of: Sniff 'n' the Tears

Mick Dyche (4 October 1951 – 21 December 2018) was an English rock and folk guitarist, and former member of 1970s soft rock band Sniff 'n' the Tears. He was known for playing guitar on their only major hit "Driver's Seat", for which he also provided the opening guitar riff, as credited by former bandmate and fellow guitarist Laurence "Loz" Netto in a 2005 interview with Lars Hindsley.

Born in Burton upon Trent, Staffordshire, England, he had appeared on Wild Turkey's 1972 album, Turkey, as a guitarist and vocalist; on Tim Rose's 1975 LP The Musician; and on Snips' 1978 LP Video King; before joining Sniff 'n' the Tears.

After Sniff 'n' the Tears, Dyche played live and recorded with a range of bands and musicians, including the Pat Travers Band, Noel McCalla, John Illsley, The Hank Wangford Band and The Maddy Prior Band. He also rejoined Glenn Cornick's band Wild Turkey, for some time circa 2006, and, more recently, he played with the Burton upon Trent-based band Mona Leeza.

== Death ==
Mick Dyche died on 21 December 2018, in Hereford. He had been diagnosed with cancer in February that same year.
