= Dean Miller (album) =

Studio album by Dean Miller
- Released: August 26, 1997
- Recorded: Castle Recording Studios, Inc., Franklin, Tennessee
- Genre: Country
- Length: 39:16
- Label: Capitol Nashville
- Producer: Gregg Brown

Dean Miller chronology
Dean Miller (1997)	Platinum (2005)

Professional ratings
Review scores
Source	Rating
Allmusic	3/5 stars
Country Standard Time	

Dean Miller is the self-titled debut album of American country music artist Dean Miller. It was released in 1997 on Capitol Records Nashville. Three singles were released from it: "Nowhere, USA", "My Heart's Broke Down (But My Mind's Made Up)", and "Wake Up and Smell the Whiskey", which was previously recorded by Brett James on his 1995 self-titled debut. Respectively, these three songs reached numbers 54, 67, and 57 on the Hot Country Songs charts. The track "I Feel Bad" features a spoken-word intro by radio host Ralph Emery.

Following this album's release, Miller left Capitol and signed in 2002 to Universal South Records, where he released three more singles for an unreleased album, entitled Just Me. His third album, Platinum, was finally issued in 2005 on Audium Entertainment.

== Track listing ==
1. "Nowhere, USA" (Dean Miller) – 3:22
2. "Wake Up and Smell the Whiskey" (Miller, Brett James) – 2:51
3. "I Used to Know Her" (Miller, Sharon Rice) – 4:19
4. "My Heart's Broke Down (But My Mind's Made Up)" (Miller, Sarah Majors) – 2:38
5. "Broke Down in Birmingham" (Conley White, Brian Tabor, Tammy Dodge) – 3:41
6. "I Feel Bad" (Miller, Kelli Owens) – 3:28
7. "Missing You" (Miller, Stacy Dean Campbell) – 3:18
8. "If I Was Your Man" (Miller, Campbell) – 4:37
9. "The Long Way Home" (Miller, Campbell, Daniel Keyes Tashian) – 3:45
10. "Dreams" (Miller) – 3:14
11. "The Running Side of Me" (Miller, Campbell) – 4:03

== Personnel ==
- Sam Bacco – percussion
- Pat Buchanan – acoustic guitar, electric guitar
- Larry Byrom – acoustic guitar
- J. T. Corenflos – electric guitar, six-string bass guitar, acoustic guitar solo on "The Long Way Home"
- Dan Dugmore – lap steel guitar, pedal steel guitar
- Larry Franklin – fiddle
- Carl Gorodetzky – violin
- Tony Harrell – Hammond B-3 organ on "Nowhere, USA", piano on "Wake Up and Smell the Whiskey" and "My Heart's Broke Down (But My Mind's Made Up)"
- Steve Hinson – pedal steel guitar on "Wake Up and Smell the Whiskey"
- Fats Kaplin – accordion on "The Long Way Home"
- Tim Lauer – accordion on "Nowhere, USA"
- Billy Livsey – Hammond B-3 organ, Wurlitzer
- Raul Malo – background vocals on "Nowhere, USA"
- Bob Mason – cello
- Kelli Owens – background vocals
- Michael Rhodes – bass guitar
- Sharon Rice – background vocals on "I Used to Know Her"
- Tammy Rogers – fiddle and viola on "Broke Down in Birmingham", mandolin
- Hargus "Pig" Robbins – piano
- Pamela Sixfin – violin
- Robbie Turner – lap steel guitar on "Wake Up and Smell the Whiskey", pedal steel guitar on "Broke Down in Birmingham"
- Steve Turner – drums, percussion
- Billy Joe Walker, Jr. – acoustic guitar on "Broke Down in Birmingham"
- Kris Wilkinson – viola
- Trisha Yearwood – background vocals on "Dreams"
