= Learning to Breathe =

Learning to Breathe may refer to:

- Learning to Breathe (Switchfoot album), 2000
- Learning to Breathe (Larry Stewart album), 1999
- "Learning to Breathe" (song), a 2007 song by Nerina Pallot
