= Listen to My Heart =

Listen to My Heart may refer to:

== Film and television ==
- Listen to My Heart (film), a 2009 Japanese drama film
- Listen to My Heart (TV series), a 2011 South Korean television series

== Music ==
- Listen to My Heart (Nancy LaMott album) or the title song, 1995
- Listen to My Heart (BoA album) or the title song, 2002
- "Listen to My Heart", a song written by Lanny Ross, Al Neibur and Abner Silver, 1939
- "Listen to My Heart", a song by The Bats, 1966
- "Listen to My Heart", a song by the Ramones from Ramones, 1976
- "Listen To My Heart", a song by Aravind–Shankar, Javed Ali and Jaya Prada from the 2016 Indian film Uyire Uyire

== See also ==
- Listen to Your Heart (disambiguation)
