= Tim Rushlow =

American singer-songwriter

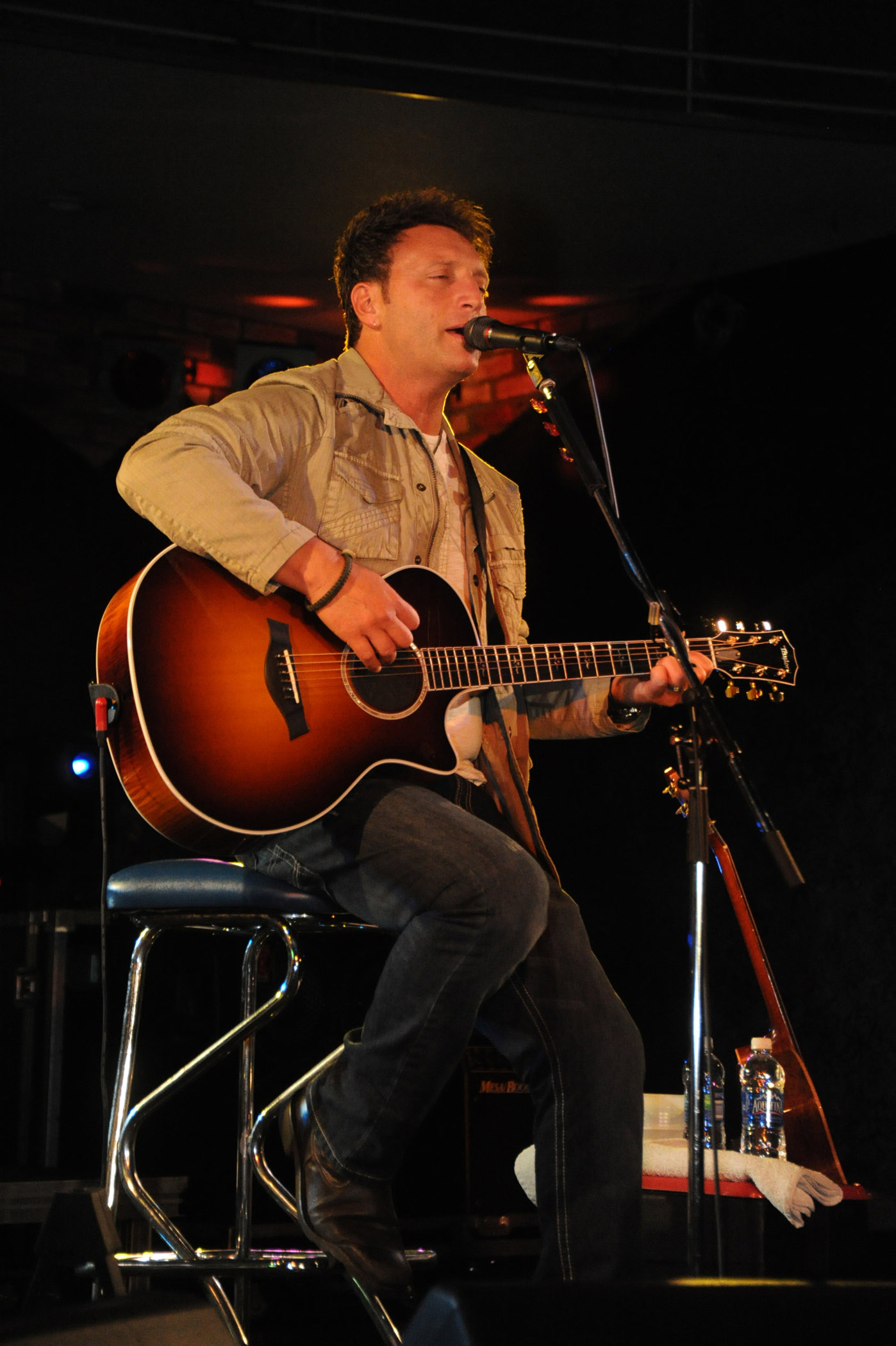
- Rushlow performing at Naval Air Facility Atsugi, October 9, 2011.

Background information
- Birth name: Timothy Ray Rushlow
- Born: October 6, 1966 (age 58); Midwest City, Oklahoma, U.S.
- Origin: Arlington, Texas, U.S.
- Genres: Country, Big band
- Occupation: Singer-songwriter
- Instrument(s): Vocals, guitar
- Years active: 1988–present
- Labels: Atlantic, Scream
- Member of: The Frontmen
- Formerly of: Little Texas, Rushlow, Rushlow Harris
- Website: www.timrushlow.com

Timothy Ray Rushlow (born October 6, 1966) is an American recording artist. Between 1991 and 1997, Rushlow was lead vocalist of country music group Little Texas, which recorded four albums and a Greatest Hits package, in addition to charting more than fifteen singles on the Billboard country singles charts during Rushlow's tenure as lead vocalist.

After Little Texas disbanded in 1997, Rushlow began a solo career. His first recording was the musical track "Totally Committed" on comedian Jeff Foxworthy's 1998 album of the same name. Two years later, Rushlow signed to Atlantic Records, recording one album and charting a Top Ten single on the country charts titled "She Misses Him". When Atlantic closed its country division in 2001, Rushlow formed a six-piece band called Rushlow, which charted two singles and recorded one album for Lyric Street Records in 2003.

Rushlow and his cousin Doni Harris (a former member of Rushlow) founded the country music duo Rushlow Harris in 2003. This duo charted two singles on the country charts that year.

== Biography ==
Rushlow was born on October 6, 1966, in Midwest City, Oklahoma, at Tinker Air Force base to a musical family. His family moved to Arlington, Texas, when he was still at a young age, although they would continue to visit Oklahoma in the summertime. Originally, Tim Rushlow was the lead singer of the country music group Little Texas. He and Dwayne O'Brien, the group's rhythm guitarist, met in Arlington, Texas, in 1984 when they went to James Martin High School and were in choir under Randy Jordan. Rushlow later moved to Nashville, Tennessee, followed by the other members of Little Texas. Little Texas had 8 Top Ten country hits from 1991 to 1995, but by 1997, the group had disbanded.

During Little Texas' hiatus, Rushlow pursued a solo career, making his first solo appearance on the musical track "Totally Committed" from comedian Jeff Foxworthy's 1998 album Totally Committed. In 2001, he was signed to Atlantic Records, and soon released his debut single, "When You Love Me". It was followed by "She Misses Him", which reached the country top 10. His self-titled debut album was also released in 2000, but Atlantic Records closed its Nashville division only one month after the album's release, and none of its other singles made the top 40. Rushlow then moved over to the independent Scream Recordings label where his album was re-issued under the title Crazy Life. A note on the cover of the "Crazy Life" promotional single commented on Atlantic's closing down. "I had spent seven weeks in the top 10 with 'She Misses Him'; We had chosen the follow-up single with great initial feedback. Then...the label closed its doors."

In 2003, Rushlow and five other musicians (including his cousin, Doni Harris) joined to form a new group called Rushlow. This new group was signed to Lyric Street Records that year, reaching the Top 20 on the Hot Country Singles & Tracks chart with "I Can't Be Your Friend". The group's released its debut album Right Now, but was soon dropped from the label due to its restructuring. By 2004, four of Little Texas' founding members reunited, but neither Rushlow nor original keyboardist Brady Seals joined the re-established band.

Harris and Rushlow formed a country duo called Rushlow Harris, which was signed to Show Dog Nashville, a record label owned by country artist Toby Keith. This duo split up after releasing two singles in 2006 and 2007.

== Discography ==
=== Studio albums ===
| Title | Album details | Peak chart positions | |
| Title | Album details | US Country | US Heat |
|---|---|---|---|
| Tim Rushlow | Release date: February 20, 2001; Label: Atlantic Records | 28 | 26 |
| Unfinished Symphony | Release date: August 24, 2011; Label: Liquid Spins Records | — | — |

=== Singles ===
| Year | Single | Peak chart positions | | Album |
| Year | Single | US Country | US | Album |
|---|---|---|---|---|
| 2000 | "When You Love Me" | 60 | — | Tim Rushlow |
| 2000 | "She Misses Him" | 8 | 59 | Tim Rushlow |
| 2001 | "Crazy Life" | 43 | — | Tim Rushlow |
| 2002 | "Love, Will (The Package)" | 52 | — | Tim Rushlow |
| 2011 | "Rain Down on Me" | — | — | Unfinished Symphony |
"—" denotes releases that did not chart

=== Guest singles ===
| Year | Single | Artist | Album |
|---|---|---|---|
| 2017 | "Let the Lion Roar" | Jaci Velasquez | single only |

=== Music videos ===
| Year | Video | Director |
|---|---|---|
| 2000 | "When You Love Me" | Jeffrey Phillips |
| 2000 | "She Misses Him" | Jim May |
