= Stacy Dean Campbell =

American singer-songwriter

- Born: July 27, 1967 (age 58); Carlsbad, New Mexico, U.S.
- Origin: Nashville, Tennessee, U.S.
- Genres: Country
- Occupation: Singer-songwriter
- Years active: 1992–present
- Labels: Columbia; Warner Bros.

Stacy Dean Campbell (born July 27, 1967) is an American singer-songwriter and author.

== Life and career ==
Stacy Dean Campbell began his music career as a teenager singing in clubs around the Oklahoma University campus and later moved to Nashville. In 1990 he signed a contract to become a staff songwriter for Tree Music, and released his first album as a solo artist on Columbia Records in 1992. Three singles from his debut album hit the Billboard Country singles chart.

Campbell released a follow-up album on Columbia in 1995 and in 1999 he moved to the Warner Brothers label and shifted his focus to making an album that featured more of his songwriting. The result was "Ashes of Old Love" which reached the number 3 position on the Americana Music Chart. In 2000, Campbell and Dean Miller co-wrote Trace Adkins' single "I'm Gonna Love You Anyway".

In 2001 Campbell left the music business and returned to New Mexico where he served as a police officer while beginning work on a new writing project. In 2004, his first novel, Cottonwood, was published. The book is set in West Texas in 1937. Included with the book is a CD which features 12 original tracks inspired by the novel and composed by Campbell.

In recent years, Campbell has expanded his career and moved behind the scenes, working as a director-writer in music videos and short films. He is the creator of the Americana Travel series, Bronco Roads, a syndicated travel series that showcased life in the American West. Campbell served as host.

== Discography ==
=== Albums ===
Title	Album details
Lonesome Wins Again	Release date: July 14, 1992; Label: Columbia Records
Hurt City	Release date: July 25, 1995; Label: Columbia Records
Ashes of Old Love	Release date: April 13, 1999; Label: Warner Bros. Records

=== Singles ===
Year	Single	Peak chart positions		Album
Year	Single	US Country	CAN Country	Album
1992	"Rosalee"	54	57	Lonesome Wins Again
1992	"Baby Don't You Know"	65	80	Lonesome Wins Again
1992	"Poor Man's Rose"	55	42	Lonesome Wins Again
1995	"Honey I Do"	61	—	Hurt City
1995	"Eight Feet High"	—	—	Hurt City
1999	"Makin' Good Time"	—	—	Ashes of Old Love
"—" denotes releases that did not chart

=== Music videos ===
Year	Video	Director
1992	"Rosalee"	Piers Plowden
1992	"Poor Man's Rose"	Roger Pistole
1995	"Eight Feet High"	Kiefer Sutherland
1999	"Makin' Good Time"	David McClister

== Track listing ==
Lonesome Wins Again
No.	Title	Writers	Length
1.	Lonesome Wins Again	Stacy Dean Campbell; Spencer Campbell; Brent Maher	3:20
2.	A Thousand Times	Billy Cowsill; Mark Irwin	2:54
3.	Baby Don't You Know	Jamie O'Hara	3:02
4.	Rosalee	Craig Bickhardt; Don Schlitz; Brent Maher	3:34
5.	That Blue Again	Jamie O'Hara	3:24
6.	Poor Man's Rose	Stacy Dean Campbell; Bill Owsley; Jody Spence	3:13
7.	That Ain't No Mountain	Brent Maher; Don Schlitz	3:23
8.	I Won't	Stacy Dean Campbell; Bill Owsley	2:21
9.	One Little Teardrop	Brent Maher; Don Schlitz	3:24
10.	Would You Run	Stacy Dean Campbell; Judson Spence	3:16
		Total Length:	31:51

Hurt City
No.	Title	Writers	Length
1.	Eight Feet High	Ed Hill; L. David Lewis	2:21
2.	Why You Were Gone So Long	Mickey Newbury	2:54
3.	I Can Dream	Jamie O'Hara; Stacy Dean Campbell	3:42
4.	Midnight Angel	John Hadley; Kevin Welch	3:28
5.	Hurt City	Dayton Wear; Bill LaBounty	4:01
6.	Pop O Top	Nat Stuckey	2:17
7.	Sometimes She Forgets	Steve Earle	3:27
8.	Honey I Do	Stacy Dean Campbell; Al Anderson	2:58
9.	Mind over Matter	Wally Wilson; Kostas	3:41
10.	There's the Door	Paul Nelson; Gene Nelson	2:33
		Total Length:	31:22

Ashes of Old Love
No.	Title	Writers	Length
1.	Makin' Good Time	Stacy Dean Campbell; Dean Miller	3:18
2.	Ashes of Old Love	Stacy Dean Campbell; John Jackson	4:35
3.	Some People (Just Can't Walk the Line)	Jamie O'Hara	4:27
4.	Train Not Running	Stacy Dean Campbell; Chris Knight	4:10
5.	I'm Gonna Fly	Stacy Dean Campbell; Dean Miller	3:56
6.	All the Winters We've Known	Stacy Dean Campbell	4:32
7.	Gone by Now	Stacy Dean Campbell; Kevin Welch	3:18
8.	One False Move	Stacy Dean Campbell	3:20
9.	Five Texas Dollars	Stacy Dean Campbell	4:23
10.	Bidding America Goodbye (The Auction)	Jamie O'Hara	3:15
11.	Rain Just Falls	David Halley	4:11
		Total Length:	43:25
