= Heart Like a Hurricane =

Studio album by Larry Stewart
- Released: September 16, 1994
- Studio: The Castle (Franklin, Tennessee); Midtown Tone & Volume (Nashville, Tennessee); Sound Shop (Nashville, Tennessee); Sound Stage (Nashville, Tennessee)
- Genre: Country
- Label: Columbia
- Producer: Scott Hendricks, John Kunz

Larry Stewart chronology
Down the Road (1993)	Heart Like a Hurricane (1994)	Why Can't You (1996)

Heart Like a Hurricane is the second studio album by the American country music singer Larry Stewart and second release after his 1991 departure from the band Restless Heart. Three singles were released from this album: "Heart Like a Hurricane", "Losing Your Love" and "Rockin' the Rock". Although none of the three fell entered the Top 40 on the Billboard US country charts, "Losing Your Love" was a #21 on the RPM country charts in Canada. Ty Herndon recorded "She Wants to Be Wanted Again" on his 1996 album Living in a Moment and released it as a single that year. "Losing Your Love" was originally recorded by Vince Gill (who co-wrote it) on his 1987 album The Way Back Home.

== Track listing ==
1. "Heart Like a Hurricane" (Trey Bruce, Craig Wiseman) – 4:03
2. "Losing Your Love" (Vince Gill, Hank DeVito, Kye Fleming) – 4:53
3. "She Wants to Be Wanted Again" (Billy Henderson, Steven Dale Jones) – 3:28
4. "It's How Deep" (James Dean Hicks, John Schweers) – 3:35
5. "Mama Needs Someone to Hold Her" (Hicks, Marc Beeson) – 3:16
6. "One Track Mind" (Bob DiPiero, Matt Rollings, Harry Stinson) – 3:36
7. "Real Life Love" (Kent Blazy, Neil Thrasher, Kelly Shiver) – 3:25
8. "Try Being Me" (Tim Mensy) – 3:58
9. "Rockin' the Rock" (Gary Burr) – 2:27
10. "I'm Not Through Lovin' You" (Gary Nicholson, Larry Stewart) – 3:51

== Personnel ==
- Gary Burr - background vocals
- J.T. Corenflos - acoustic guitar, electric guitar
- Dan Dugmore - steel guitar
- Stuart Duncan - fiddle
- Paul Franklin - steel guitar
- Vince Gill - background vocals
- Rob Hajacos - fiddle
- Dann Huff - electric guitar, gut string guitar
- John Barlow Jarvis - keyboards, piano
- Terry McMillan - percussion, tambourine
- Carl Marsh - fairlight
- Brent Mason - electric guitar
- Steve Nathan - organ
- Don Potter - acoustic guitar
- Michael Rhodes - bass guitar
- John Wesley Ryles - background vocals
- Larry Stewart - lead vocals, background vocals
- Harry Stinson - background vocals
- Billy Thomas - background vocals
- Cindy Richardson-Walker - background vocals
- Dennis Wilson - background vocals
- Lonnie Wilson - drums
