= Tim Rushlow (album) =

Studio album by Tim Rushlow
- Released: February 20, 2001
- Recorded: 2000 at Starstruck & Malloy Boys Studios, Nashville, TN
- Genre: Country
- Length: 41:38
- Label: Atlantic
- Producer: David Malloy

Professional ratings
Review scores
Source	Rating
Country Standard Time	

Tim Rushlow is the solo debut album of American country music artist Tim Rushlow, formerly co-lead vocalist of the country music band Little Texas. Released in February 2001 on Atlantic Records, it is also his only solo album, although he did release another album and two singles in the band Rushlow, as well as two more singles in the duo Rushlow Harris. Tim Rushlow accounted for four singles on the Billboard country singles charts, including "She Misses Him", his only Top 40 country hit. After Atlantic Records shut down, the album was re-released in 2002 on The Scream Recordings Label and retitled Crazy Life after the song of same. An extra track, "As Real as Forever" was included.

== Content ==
Four singles were released from Tim Rushlow: "When You Love Me", "She Misses Him", "Crazy Life", and "Love, Will" (which was re-titled "Love, Will (The Package)" upon release to radio). Of these, "She Misses Him" was the only one to chart in the Top 40 on the Billboard country singles charts, peaking at number eight. Several of the tracks on this album were written by Little Texas guitarist Porter Howell. "In the Meantime" was also recorded by its co-writer Sherrié Austin on her 2001 album Followin' a Feelin', released in March 2001. Austin's version was released as a single in 2002 but failed to chart.

== Track listing ==
No.	Title	Writer(s)	Length
1.	"Then There's Me"	Porter Howell, Tim Rushlow, Noah Gordon	3:39
2.	"In the Meantime"	Rob Crosby, Sherrié Austin, Will Rambeaux	3:39
3.	"She Misses Him"	Tim Johnson	3:47
4.	"Crazy Life"	Kevin Fisher	4:03
5.	"American Cars"	David Grissom, Jay Booker, Howell, Rushlow	3:21
6.	"When You Love Me"	David Malloy, Rushlow, Howell	3:52
7.	"Everything to You"	Robert Ellis Orrall, Joel Feeney	4:04
8.	"I Live"	Gary Baker, Frank J. Myers, Malloy	3:58
9.	"The World Turns"	Fisher, Tim James, Fred Wilhelm	3:30
10.	"The Package"	Rushlow	4:34
11.	"That's How It's Gonna Be" (Included on Re-release only)	Gordon, Rushlow, Howell	3:02
12.	"As Real as Forever"	Rushlow, Howell, Malloy	3:27

== Personnel ==
As listed in liner notes

- Ron Block – banjo
- Richard Brannan – bass guitar
- Eric Darken – percussion
- Larry Franklin – fiddle, mandolin
- Paul Franklin – Dobro, steel guitar
- Tommy Harden – drums
- Aubrey Haynie – fiddle, mandolin
- Wes Hightower – background vocals
- Jeff King – electric guitar
- Paul Leim – drums
- B. James Lowry – acoustic guitar
- Brent Mason – electric guitar
- Jerry McPherson – electric guitar
- Jimmy Nichols – piano, keyboards, background vocals
- Russ Pahl – steel guitar

== Chart performance ==
Chart (2001)	Peak position
U.S. Billboard Top Country Albums	28
U.S. Billboard Top Heatseekers	26
