= Down the Road (Larry Stewart album) =

Studio album by Larry Stewart
- Released: April 27, 1993
- Recorded: 1992 at Quad Studios, Nashville, TN
- Genre: Country
- Length: 33:25
- Label: RCA Nashville
- Producer: Scott Hendricks, Larry Stewart

Larry Stewart chronology
Down the Road (1993)	Heart Like a Hurricane (1994)

Down the Road is the debut solo studio album by American country music artist Larry Stewart. It was his first solo release, as he had left his role as lead singer of the band Restless Heart a year before. The album was released in 1993 on RCA Records Nashville and it produced three singles for him on the Billboard country charts: "Alright Already" at number five, "I'll Cry Tomorrow" at number 34 and "We Can Love" at number 62. Also included is "When I Close My Eyes", a number two hit in 1997 for Kenny Chesney.

Brian Mansfield of Allmusic rated the album four stars out of five, saying that he considered it more country than Stewart's work in Restless Heart.

== Track listing ==
No.	Title	Writer(s)	Length
1.	"Alright Already"	Byron Hill, J. B. Rudd	2:35
2.	"When I Close My Eyes"	Nettie Musick, Mark Alan Springer	3:36
3.	"I'll Cry Tomorrow"	Steve Bogard, Rick Giles	3:50
4.	"She Needs Me"	Chuck Cannon, Jimmy Alan Stewart	3:22
5.	"We Can Love"	Marc Beeson, Jill Colucci	3:33
6.	"I Came Straight to You"	John Barlow Jarvis, Kevin Welch	2:48
7.	"When You Come Back to Me"	Troy Seals, Larry Stewart, Eddie Setser	3:18
8.	"The Boy Down the Road"	Stewart Harris	4:04
9.	"The Night Is Young and You're So Beautiful"	Andy Byrd, Jim Robinson	2:49
10.	"Brittany"	Lewis Anderson	3:37^{A}

- ^{A}Omitted from cassette version.

== Personnel ==
Compiled from liner notes.

=== Musicians ===
- Eddie Bayers — drums
- Suzy Bogguss — background vocals
- Larry Byrom — electric guitar
- Bruce C. Bouton — steel guitar
- Mark Casstevens — acoustic guitar
- Carol Chase — background vocals
- Chad Cromwell — drums
- Bill Cuomo — synthesizer
- Dan Dugmore — acoustic guitar, steel guitar
- Stuart Duncan — fiddle
- Rick Giles — background vocals
- Vince Gill — background vocals
- Doyle Grisham — steel guitar
- Rob Hajacos — fiddle
- John Jorgenson — electric guitar
- Chris Leuzinger — electric guitar
- Brent Mason — electric guitar
- Terry McMillan — percussion
- Steve Nathan — piano, synthesizer, Hammond B-3 organ
- Michael Noble — acoustic guitar
- Danny Parks — electric guitar
- Dave Pomeroy — bass guitar
- Michael Rhodes — bass guitar
- Brent Rowan — electric guitar
- John Wesley Ryles — background vocals
- Larry Stewart — lead vocals, piano
- Harry Stinson — background vocals
- Cindy Richardson Walker — background vocals
- Biff Watson — acoustic guitar
- John D. Willis — electric guitar
- Dennis Wilson — background vocals

=== Technical ===
- Mike Clute — additional recording
- Scott Hendricks — producer, mixing
- John Kelton — recording
- John Kunz — additional recording
- Larry Stewart — producer
- Hank Williams — mastering
