= Alright Already (song) =

Single by Larry Stewart

from the album Down the Road
- B-side: "The Boy Down the Road"
- Released: February 22, 1993
- Genre: Country
- Length: 2:35
- Label: RCA Nashville
- Songwriters: Byron Hill, JB Rudd
- Producers: Scott Hendricks, Larry Stewart

Larry Stewart singles chronology
"Alright Already" (1993)	"I'll Cry Tomorrow" (1993)

"Alright Already" is a song written by Byron Hill and JB Rudd, and recorded by American country music artist Larry Stewart. It was Stewart's first release as a solo artist, following an eight-year tenure as the lead singer of Restless Heart. It was released in February 1993 as the first single from his solo debut album Down the Road. The song peaked at number 5 on the Hot Country Singles & Tracks charts and number 4 on the Canadian RPM country music charts. Stewart charted seven other singles afterward, but only one ("I'll Cry Tomorrow") made the U.S. top 40.

== Music video ==
The music video was directed by Deaton Flanigen and premiered in early 1993.

== Chart performance ==
"Alright Already" debuted at number 64 on the U.S. Billboard Hot Country Singles & Tracks for the week of March 6, 1993.

Chart (1993)	Peak position
Canada Country Singles (RPM)	4
US Hot Country Songs (Billboard)	5

=== Year-end charts ===
Chart (1993)	Position
Canada Country Tracks (RPM)	75
US Country Songs (Billboard)	59
