= Why Can't You =

1996 album by Larry Stewart

Studio album by Larry Stewart
- Released: September 3, 1996
- Studio: Masterfonics, Woodland Digital Sound Studios, and The Work Station, Nashville, TN
- Genre: Country
- Label: Columbia
- Producer: Emory Gordy Jr.

Larry Stewart chronology
Heart Like a Hurricane (1994)	Why Can't You (1996)	Learning to Breathe (1999)

Why Can't You is the third studio album by the American country music singer Larry Stewart and his final album for Columbia Records. It was released in 1996. Singles released from the album were "Why Can't You" and "Always a Woman", which respectively reached #46 and #70 on the Billboard country singles charts.

Thom Owens gave the album three stars out of five in Allmusic, where he wrote that it "suffers from an uneven selection of material and production that plays it too close to the vest".

== Track listing ==
1. "They Ain't Made Enough Road" (Wendell Mobley, Tom Shapiro) – 2:31
2. "Always a Woman" (J. Fred Knobloch, Steve O'Brien) – 3:37
3. "That's What One Night Can Do" (Michael Huffman, Donny Kees, Bob Morrison) – 3:37
4. "There Goes the Neighborhood" (Bob DiPiero, John Scott Sherrill, Pebe Sebert) – 2:35
5. "I've Got My Hands Full" (Tony Martin, Brenda Sweat, Cal Sweat) – 3:40
6. "Shake, Rattle and Rollin' in the Country" (Jamie O'Hara) – 3:01
7. "Why Can't You" (Larry Stewart, R.C. Bannon) – 3:50
8. "This Heart" (Stewart, Bannon) – 4:25
9. "I'll Know When I Get There" (Angelo Petraglia, Robert Ellis Orrall, Curtis Wright) – 2:57
10. "As Time Goes" (Tony Haselden, Tim Mensy) – 4:00

== Personnel ==
- Deborah Allen - background vocals
- Jerry Douglas - dobro, slide guitar
- Dan Dugmore - steel guitar
- Glen Duncan - fiddle, mandolin
- Stuart Duncan - fiddle, mandolin
- Paul Franklin - steel guitar
- Vince Gill - background vocals
- Emory Gordy Jr. - bass guitar, acoustic guitar
- Jimmy Hall - harmonica
- Dann Huff - electric guitar
- Patty Loveless - background vocals
- Brent Mason - electric guitar
- Steve Nathan - keyboards
- Robert Ellis Orrall - background vocals
- Larry Stewart - lead vocals, background vocals
- Harry Stinson - background vocals
- Biff Watson - acoustic guitar
- Dennis Wilson - background vocals
- Lonnie Wilson - bass guitar, drums
