= She Misses Him =

Single by Tim Rushlow

from the album Tim Rushlow
- Released: October 30, 2000
- Genre: Country
- Length: 3:49
- Label: Atlantic
- Songwriter: Tim Johnson
- Producer: David Malloy

Tim Rushlow singles chronology
"When You Love Me" (2000)	"She Misses Him" (2000)	"Crazy Life" (2001)

"She Misses Him" is a song written by Tim Johnson, and recorded by American country music artist Tim Rushlow. It was released in October 2000 as the second single from his debut solo studio album Tim Rushlow. The song peaked at number 8 on the U.S. country charts. It also reached number 59 on the Billboard Hot 100. It was his highest peaking single and his only top 40 single as a solo artist. It was also Rushlow's only peaking single on the Hot 100.

== Content ==
The song discusses Alzheimer's disease as seen from the perspective of a woman married to a victim of said illness.

== Critical reception ==
A review in Billboard praised it as an "extremely well-written take on enduring love and devotion in the face of tough times" and described Rushlow's voice favorably, but criticized the "heavy-handed production".

== Music video ==
The music video was directed by Jim May and premiered in January 2001. The music video contains many past photos of Ronald Reagan.

== Chart performance ==
"She Misses Him" debuted at number 60 on the U.S. Billboard Hot Country Singles & Tracks for the chart week of November 4, 2000.

Chart (2000–2001)	Peak position
US Hot Country Songs (Billboard)	8
US Billboard Hot 100	59

=== Year-end charts ===
Chart (2001)	Position
US Country Songs (Billboard)	42
