= I Go Crazy (Paul Davis song) =

- German single picture sleeve

Single by Paul Davis

from the album Singer of Songs: Teller of Tales
- B-side: "Reggae Kinda Way"
- Released: June 1977
- Genre: Soft rock
- Length: 3:52 (album Version); 3:37 (single version − as printed on label but plays identical to album version)
- Label: Bang (US, Canada, UK); Stateside (Australia); Bellaphon (Germany); EMI (New Zealand)
- Songwriter: Paul Davis
- Producer: Paul Davis

Paul Davis singles chronology
"Superstar" (1976)	"I Go Crazy" (1977)	"Darlin'" (1978)

Alternative release
- Side A of US single

"I Go Crazy" is a song written, composed, and recorded by American singer-songwriter Paul Davis. It was the first single released from his 1977 album Singer of Songs: Teller of Tales, and his second-highest peaking pop hit, peaking at #7 on the Billboard chart in 1978. The song entered the Hot 100 on August 27, 1977 and began slowly climbing, peaking in March and April 1978, before dropping off the chart the week after May 27, 1978. Overall, it spent 40 weeks (nine months and one week) on the Hot 100, setting what was then the record for the longest run on that chart.

== Content ==
The lyrics describe the feelings of a man who has an unexpected meeting with a former girlfriend. Both have moved on from the relationship, and he had thought she was out of his life forever. Looking at her, however, rekindles his old affection and makes him "go crazy", at least inwardly. To his credit, he does not act on these feelings, though he does realize that he is not really over her.

== Personnel ==
Instrumental credits taken from Mixonline.

- Paul Davis – lead and backing vocals, Fender Rhodes electric piano, Crumar Univox Stringman
- Alan Feingold – grand piano, ARP Odyssey
- Kenny Mims – electric guitar
- Bill Linnane – keyboard
- Ed Seay – bass guitar, backing vocals
- James Stroud – drums
- Michael Zager – string arrangements

== Covers ==
The song has been covered by several artists, including four whose versions were released as singles:

- Lee Greenwood, on his 1989 album If Only for One Night; Greenwood's version was issued as a single that summer for the country music market
- Will Downing, on his 1991 album A Dream Fulfilled; Downing's version was also a single
- Steve Azar, on his 1996 album Heartbreak Town
- Barry Manilow, on his 1996 album Summer of '78
- DHT, on their 2005 album Listen to Your Heart

== Chart performance ==
=== Paul Davis ===
==== Weekly charts ====
Chart (1977–1978)	Peak position
Canadian RPM Top Singles	4
U.S. Billboard Hot 100	7
U.S. Billboard Easy Listening	25
U.S. Cash Box Top 100	7

==== Year-end charts ====
Chart (1978)	Rank
Canada	39
U.S. Billboard Hot 100	12
U.S. Cash Box	44

=== Lee Greenwood ===
Chart (1989)	Peak position
Canada Country Singles (RPM)	47
US Hot Country Songs (Billboard)	55

=== Will Downing ===
Chart (1991)	Peak position
U.S. Billboard Hot R&B/Hip-Hop Songs	37

=== Barry Manilow ===
Chart (1997)	Peak position
U.S. Billboard Hot Adult Contemporary Tracks	30

=== DHT featuring Edmée ===
Chart (2006)	Peak position
Belgium (Ultratip Bubbling Under Flanders)	3
Belgium (Ultratip Bubbling Under Wallonia)	15
France (SNEP)	76
Netherlands (Single Top 100)	56
