= Learning to Breathe (Larry Stewart album) =

Studio album by Larry Stewart
- Released: May 18, 1999
- Genre: Country, adult contemporary
- Length: 49:13
- Label: Windham Hill
- Producer: Michael Omartian

Larry Stewart chronology
Why Can't You (1996)	Learning to Breathe (1999)

Learning to Breathe is the fourth album by the American country music singer Larry Stewart. The final solo album of his career, it was released in 1999 on Windham Hill Records. "Still in Love", the only single, failed to chart. "Summer in the City" is a cover of a single originally recorded by The Lovin' Spoonful. After the album's release, Stewart rejoined Restless Heart in 2003, and has been a member since.

Stephen Thomas Erlewine rated the album three stars out of five in Allmusic, saying that he considered it to have a more adult contemporary radio-format sound than a country sound, but referring to Stewart's voice as "smooth [and] robust."

== Track listing ==
1. "Take This Heart" (Larry Stewart, John Bettis, R.C. Bannon) – 4:55
2. "Anything Else but You" (Stewart, Michael Omartian, Bruce Sudano) – 3:45
3. "Learning to Breathe Again" (Omartian, Sudano) – 3:46
4. "In My Dreams Tonight" (Stewart, Jill Colucci, Stewart Harris) – 4:08
5. "Prodigal Daughter" (Stewart, Omartian) – 4:45
6. "Still in Love" (Stewart, Tommy Lee James) – 3:57
7. "Fantasy" (Stewart, Bannon) – 6:34
8. "Gotta Tell Somebody" (Stewart, Phillip Moore) – 4:29
9. "Compared to Goodbye" (Stewart, Moore) – 4:01
  - duet with Tabitha Fair
10. "Takin' My Time" (Stewart, Moore) – 5:07
11. "A Reason to Believe" (Stewart, Robert Ellis Orrall, Robert Hart) – 3:47
12. "Summer in the City" (Mark Sebastian, Steve Boone) – 4:13
  - intro: "In the Hall of the Mountain King" by Edvard Grieg

== Personnel ==
As listed in liner notes.

- Mike Brignardello – bass guitar
- Mark Douthit – saxophone
- Tabitha Fair – background vocals
- Billy Gaines – background vocals
- Vince Gill – electric guitar
- John Hammond – drums
- Tom Hemby – electric guitar
- B. James Lowry – acoustic guitar
- Michael McDonald – background vocals
- Chris McHugh – drums
- Jerry McPherson – electric guitar
- Michael Mellett – background vocals
- Gene Miller – background vocals
- Michael Omartian – piano, organ, synthesizer, accordion, programming
- Tiffany Palmer – background vocals
- Chris Rodriguez – background vocals, electric guitar
- Nicol Smith – background vocals
- Jimmie Lee Sloas – bass guitar
- Micah Wilshire – background vocals

Strings performed by the Nashville String Machine, contracted by Carl Gorodetzky and arranged by Michael Omartian.
