= I Can't Be Your Friend =

Single by Rushlow

from the album Right Now
- Released: April 21, 2003
- Genre: Country
- Length: 3:22
- Label: Lyric Street
- Songwriters: Brad Crisler; Rodney Clawson
- Producers: Christy DiNapoli; Tim Rushlow

Rushlow singles chronology
"I Can't Be Your Friend" (2003)	"Sweet Summer Rain" (2004)

"I Can't Be Your Friend" is a song recorded by American country music band Rushlow. It was released in April 2003 as the first single from their debut album Right Now. The song was written by Brad Crisler and Rodney Clawson.

== Music video ==
The music video was directed by Shaun Silva and premiered in late 2003.

== Chart performance ==
"I Can't Be Your Friend" debuted at number 56 on the U.S. Billboard Hot Country Singles & Tracks chart for the week of May 10, 2003.

Chart (2003)	Peak position
US Hot Country Songs (Billboard)	16
US Billboard Bubbling Under Hot 100	6

=== Year-end charts ===
Chart (2003)	Position
US Country Songs (Billboard)	51
