= Rushlow =

American country music band

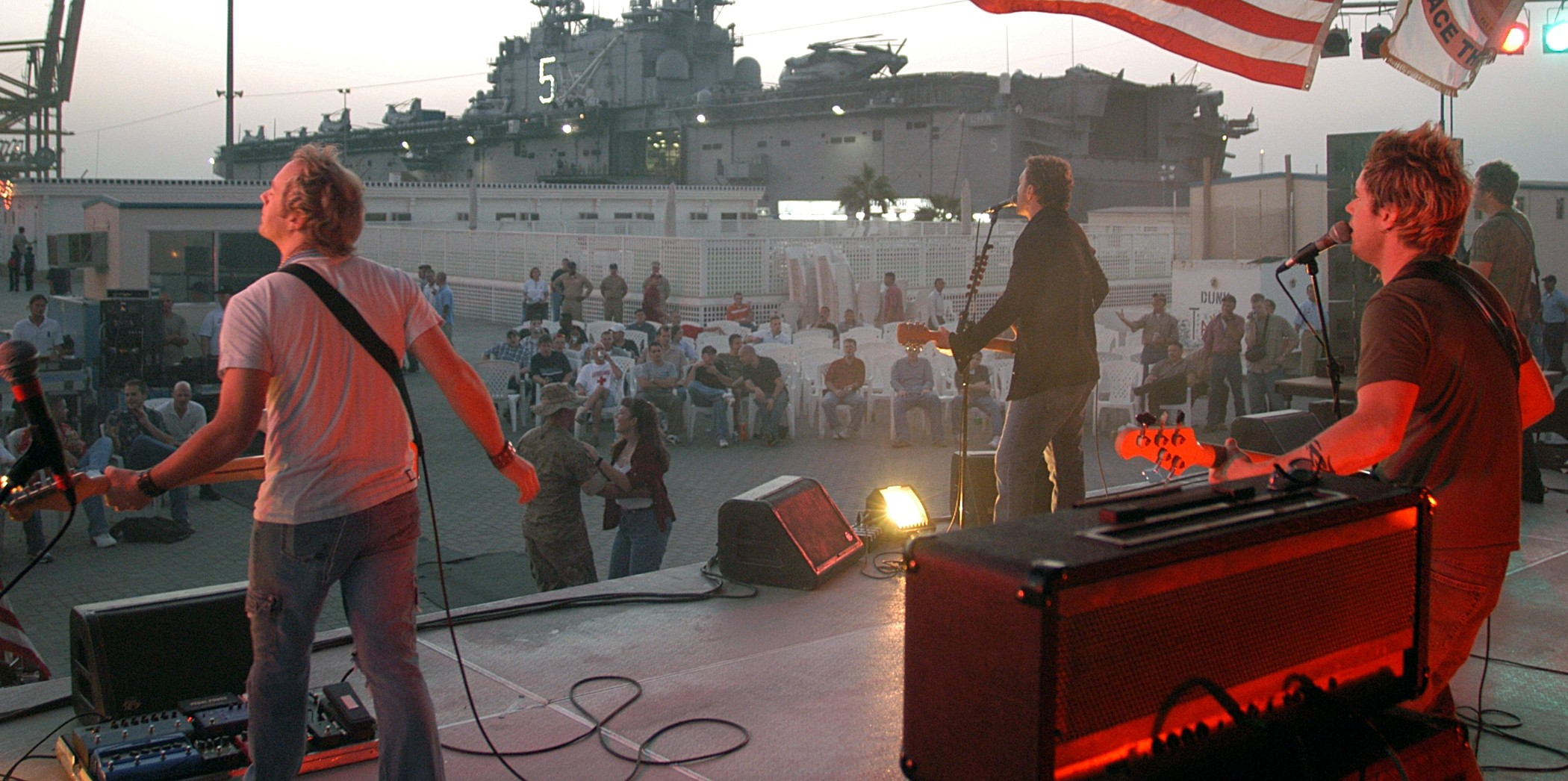

Background information
- Also known as: Rushlow Harris
- Origin: Nashville, Tennessee, U.S.
- Genres: Country
- Years active: 2003–2004
- Labels: Lyric Street; Show Dog Nashville
- Spinoffs: Rushlow Harris, New Voice Entertainment
- Spinoff of: Little Texas
- Past members: Kurt Allison; Doni Harris; Tully Kennedy; Rich Redmond; Tim Rushlow; Billy Welch

Rushlow was an American country music band founded in 2003. Its members were Tim Rushlow (lead vocals), Doni Harris (banjo, acoustic guitar, vocals), Kurt Allison (acoustic guitar, electric guitar, vocals), Tully Kennedy (bass guitar, vocals), Rich Redmond (drums), and Billy Welch (keyboards). Prior to the band's foundation, Rushlow was lead singer of Little Texas until 1997, and a solo artist between then and 2001.

Signed to Lyric Street Records in 2003, Rushlow released two singles and one album (Right Now) on the label that year. Rushlow and Harris later recorded two singles as the duo Rushlow Harris for the Show Dog Nashville label in 2006. After disbanding, Kennedy, Allison, and Redmond became members of Jason Aldean's road band; they, along with David Fanning, also founded the record producer team New Voice Entertainment.

== Biography ==
Before the foundation of Rushlow, lead vocalist Tim Rushlow was lead singer of the band Little Texas. In 1997, when they disbanded, Tim Rushlow left for a solo career. His first cut was the musical track "Totally Committed" on comedian Jeff Foxworthy's 1998 album of the same name. Tim Rushlow signed to Atlantic Records in 2000, charting the Top Ten single "She Misses Him" that year. Other singles from his self-titled debut album, however, failed to make Top 40, due in part to the closure of his label in 2001. He formed the group Rushlow after deciding that he was not made for a solo career, saying: "I did some shows and I had a band and a bus, but I never felt real comfortable as the Tim Rushlow solo guy with this band that was not named, that was just sort of 'Tim's backup band.' It just never really felt right."

One of the group's first members was Rushlow's cousin Doni Harris, who had previously sung backing vocals on his solo album. Later, Rushlow and Harris had spotted Kurt Allison, as well as Allison's roommates Rich Redmond and Tully Kennedy, all of whom were backing another singer at a bar, and eventually Billy Welch was added to the lineup as well. The group was signed to Lyric Street Records, on the condition that they assume the name Rushlow and perform as a self-contained band, with no additional studio musicians. The lead-off single, "I Can't Be Your Friend", was a Top 20 country hit in 2003, and the group also entertained U.S. troops in Bahrain, Germany, Italy and Spain. The song served as the lead-off to Rushlow's debut album Right Now, which produced only one more chart single on the country charts.

=== 2006–2007: Rushlow Harris ===
In 2006, Rushlow and Harris recorded as the duo Rushlow Harris. The duo signed to Show Dog Nashville, a label owned by country singer Toby Keith. Working with producer Christy DiNapoli and Derek Bason, the duo released two singles but no album. In 2017, Rushlow founded the Frontmen with Richie McDonald and Larry Stewart, respectively the former lead singers of Lonestar and Restless Heart.

Kennedy, Allison, and Redmond joined Jason Aldean's road band. They, along with David Fanning, also formed the production team New Voice Entertainment, which has produced for Thompson Square. Welch became the keyboardist in Jake Owen's road band.

== Discography ==
=== As Rushlow ===
==== Studio albums ====
Title	Album details	Peak positions
Title	Album details	US Heat
Right Now	Release date: December 9, 2003; Label: Lyric Street Records	37

==== Singles ====
Year	Single	Peak chart positions		Album
Year	Single	US Country	US Bubbling	Album
2003	"I Can't Be Your Friend"	16	6	Right Now
2004	"Sweet Summer Rain"	42	—	Right Now
"—" denotes releases that did not chart

==== Music videos ====
Year	Video	Director
2003	"I Can't Be Your Friend"	Shaun Silva

=== As Rushlow Harris ===
==== Singles ====
Year	Single	Peak positions
Year	Single	US Country
2006	"That's So You"	57
2006	"Bagpipes Cryin'"	42

==== Music videos ====
Year	Video	Director
2006	"Bagpipes Cryin'"	Steven Goldmann
