= Larry Stewart =

American country music singer (born 1959)

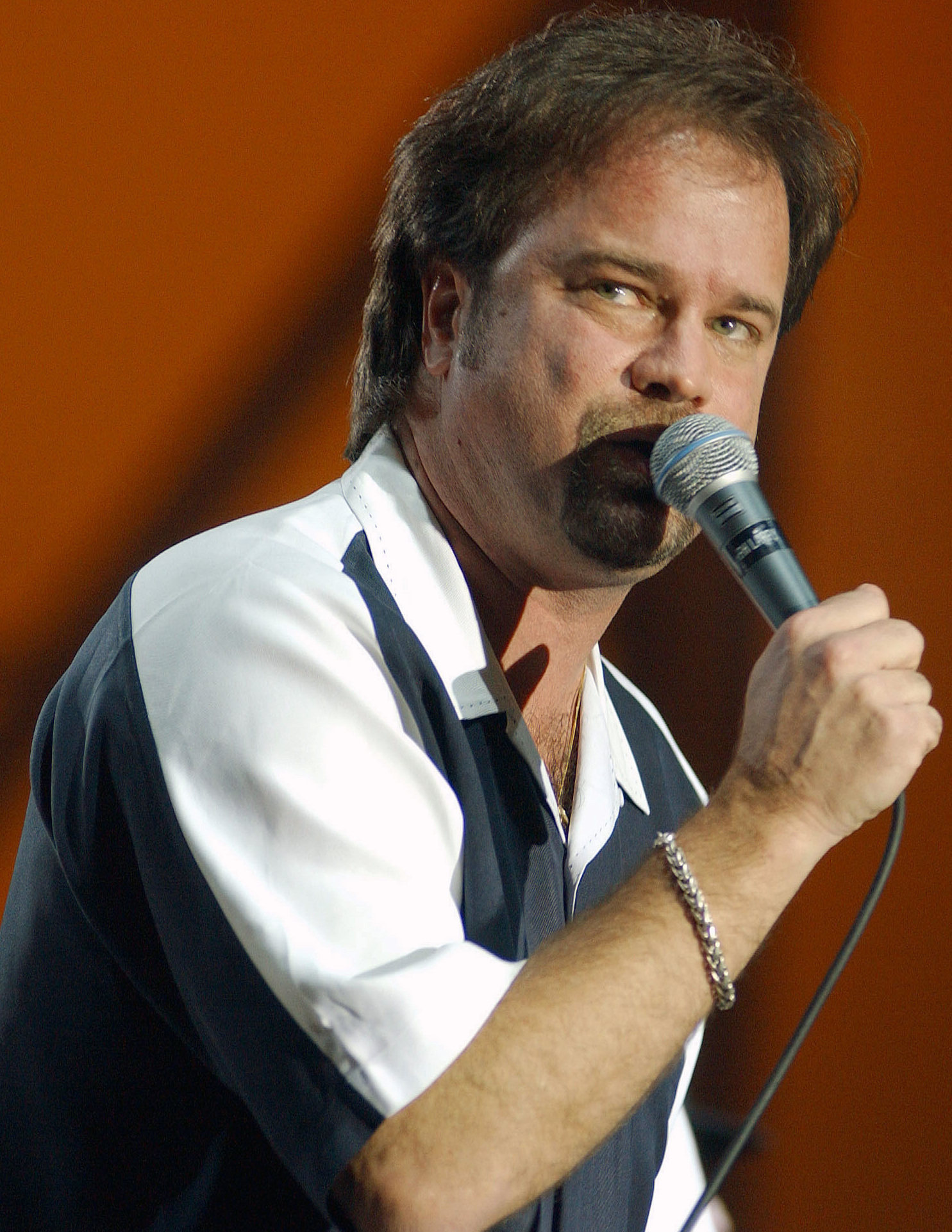
- Stewart performing with Restless Heart at a USO show at Ramstein Air Base, Germany in 2003

Background information
- Born: March 2, 1959 (age 67)
- Origin: Paducah, Kentucky, U.S.
- Genres: Country
- Occupation: Singer-songwriter
- Instruments: Vocals, guitar, keyboards
- Years active: 1984–present
- Labels: RCA, Columbia, Windham Hill
- Member of: The Frontmen
- Formerly of: Restless Heart

Larry Stewart (born March 2, 1959) is an American country music singer and songwriter. He is best known for his role as lead singer of the country pop band Restless Heart, a role which he held on and off between 1984 and the band's breakup in 2021. Additionally, he has released multiple solo projects between 1993 and 2018, a year after his joining the Frontmen. Stewart's solo career includes two albums for RCA Records, one for Columbia Records, and one for Windham Hill Records. His solo albums include multiple charted singles on the Billboard Hot Country Songs charts, including the top-five hit "Alright Already" in 1993.

== Biography ==
Larry Stewart was born March 2, 1959, in Paducah, Kentucky. He moved to Nashville, Tennessee, in the 1980s in pursuit of a career in baseball. Although he had received an athletic scholarship from Belmont University in Nashville, he decided to focus on a career in music instead. After finding work as a demo singer, Larry joined the group Restless Heart in 1984 at the recommendation of the band's keyboardist Dave Innis, with whom Stewart had attended college. Between 1985 and 1993, Restless Heart charted 18 Top 40 singles on the U.S. Billboard Hot Country Singles & Tracks chart (including six Number Ones, as well as one single that was released only to the Adult Contemporary format). Stewart left the group in 1991 in pursuit of a solo career. The band continued for four more years without him, trading off lead vocals among the other members.

== Solo career ==
Stewart released his solo debut album on the RCA Nashville label in 1993. Titled Down the Road, the album produced a Top 5 country hit in the single "Alright Already," along with a number 34 follow-up, "I'll Cry Tomorrow," and "We Can Love," which peaked at 62. This album also included a cover of Kevin Welch's 1989 single "I Came Straight to You", and the song "When I Close My Eyes", which was later a Top 5 hit in 1996 for Kenny Chesney.

In 1994, the same year that Restless Heart disbanded, Stewart made two contributions to Faith Hill's debut album Take Me as I Am, co-writing the single "But I Will" with Troy Seals and singing duet vocals on "I've Got This Friend". Later that year, he moved to Columbia Records, releasing Heart Like a Hurricane. The album accounted for three more singles – the title track, followed by the Vince Gill co-write "Losing Your Love" and "Rockin' the Rock" — all of which failed to make Top 40 on the US country charts, although "Losing Your Love" reached number 21 on the RPM country singles charts Canada.

Why Can't You, Stewart's third album was released in 1996, also on Columbia. Its title track reached number 46, followed by the number 70 "Always a Woman". After this album, Stewart briefly reunited with all of the members of Restless Heart (save for Innis) to record new tracks for a Greatest Hits album, but disbanded again soon afterward. Stewart released his fourth solo album, Learning to Breathe, in 1999 on independent Windham Hill Records, although this album did not account for any chart singles.

== Restless Heart Reunion ==
In 2004, Stewart and the other four members of Restless Heart officially reunited to record the album Still Restless on Audium Entertainment, a branch of Koch Records (now E1 Music). On most of the tracks, Stewart again assumed his role as lead singer. Still Restless produced a Top 30 hit in the single "Feel My Way to You", but Koch Records closed the Audium label in early 2005. He has remained with Restless Heart until the 2020s.

Stewart joined Nashville's Breezewood Productions in 2014 as chief operating officer focusing on promising new talent while continuing to bring music through his association with Restless Heart as well as a modern solo career.

== Discography ==
=== Albums ===
| Title | Album details | Peak positions |
| Title | Album details | US Heat |
|---|---|---|
| Down the Road | Release date: April 27, 1993; Label: RCA Records; Format: CD, cassette | 39 |
| Heart Like a Hurricane | Release date: August 16, 1994; Label: Columbia Records; Format: CD, cassette | — |
| Why Can't You | Release date: September 3, 1996; Label: Columbia Records; Format: CD, cassette | — |
| Learning to Breathe | Release date: May 18, 1999; Label: Windham Hill Records; Format: CD, cassette | — |
| Shifting Gears | Release date: September 7, 2018; Label: Self-released; Format: CD, Digital | |
"—" denotes releases that did not chart

=== Singles ===
| Year | Single | Peak chart positions | | Album |
| Year | Single | US Country | CAN Country | Album |
|---|---|---|---|---|
| 1993 | "Alright Already" | 5 | 4 | Down the Road |
| 1993 | "I'll Cry Tomorrow" | 34 | 28 | Down the Road |
| 1993 | "We Can Love" | 62 | 69 | Down the Road |
| 1994 | "Heart Like a Hurricane" | 43 | 61 | Heart Like a Hurricane |
| 1994 | "Losing Your Love" | 46 | 21 | Heart Like a Hurricane |
| 1995 | "Rockin' the Rock" | 56 | 61 | Heart Like a Hurricane |
| 1996 | "Why Can't You" | 46 | 71 | Why Can't You |
| 1997 | "Always a Woman" | 70 | — | Why Can't You |
| 1999 | "Still in Love" | — | — | Learning to Breathe |
| 2018 | "What's That Cowgirl See In Me?" | — | — | Shifting Gears |
"—" denotes releases that did not chart

=== Music videos ===
| Year | Video | Director |
|---|---|---|
| 1993 | "Alright Already" | Deaton Flanigen |
| 1993 | "We Can Love" | |
| 1994 | "Heart Like a Hurricane" | Jeffrey C. Phillips |
| 1994 | "Losing Your Love" | |
| 1996 | "Why Can't You" | |
| 2018 | "What’s That Cowgirl See In Me" | |
