= Sniff 'n' the Tears =

British rock band

Background information
- Origin: London, England
- Genres: Pop rock; new wave; soft rock; power pop
- Years active: 1977–1983, 1992–present
- Labels: Chiswick Records (UK), Atlantic Records (US)
- Website: sniffnthetears.com

Sniff 'n' the Tears are a British rock band best known for their 1978 song "Driver's Seat", a moderate hit in many countries, including No. 15 on the American Billboard Hot 100, in September 1979. The band is led by singer–songwriter Paul Roberts, the band's sole constant member.

== Formation and initial success (1973–1979) ==
An early version of Sniff 'n' the Tears had been gigging in England as early as 1974. They were unable to land a record deal and the band's singer–songwriter Paul Roberts decided to dissolve the group and move to France.

A few years later, Luigi Salvoni, the drummer from a band called Moon that issued two albums in the UK in 1975/76, revisited some demos that he and Roberts had cut around 1975 for a French record label. Hearing some potential in them, he contacted Roberts about approaching pub rock label, Chiswick Records for a deal. Roberts, who had been concentrating on his career as a painter, agreed and Salvoni recruited some of the musicians from the demos to record Fickle Heart, which would become the soon-to-be-officially-formed group's debut album. When it became apparent that things were going well and that a band would be needed for live work and promotion, Sniff 'n' the Tears subsequently debuted in 1978 as a six-piece band, consisting of Roberts (vocals, acoustic guitar), Salvoni (drums & percussion), Salvoni's former Moon bandmate Loz Netto (guitars), Mick Dyche (guitars), Chris Birkin (bass), and Alan Fealdman (keyboards).

This line-up recorded the band's first album, Fickle Heart, which was produced by Salvoni. Guesting on the album as a backing vocalist was Noel McCalla, who had been Moon's lead singer.

Though recorded in 1978, the album sat unreleased for over a year because Chiswick were in the process of changing their distribution. However, once Fickle Heart was released, the band had a substantial international hit with the lead single "Driver's Seat" in 1979, aided by its driving rhythm, catchy lyrics and a Moog solo contributed by guest musician Keith Miller, who would soon officially join the band for a subsequent tour. However, the band fractured almost immediately after the album's release; in a matter of months, Birkin, Fealdman, and Salvoni all left the group to pursue other interests.

Nick South took over on bass and would become a permanent member of the band. On tour, Sniff 'n' the Tears were augmented by drummer Paul Robinson, in addition to "Driver's Seat" Moog keyboardist Miller.

When naming the 1973 band, Roberts suggested "The Tears", but their manager suggested "Sniff 'n' the Tears" because Roberts had hay fever and sniffed a lot.

== 1980s ==
For the group's second album, 1980's The Game's Up, the band's line-up consisted of Roberts, Netto, Dyche, South, and new keyboard player Miffy Smith . At this point the group had no permanent drummer, and a variety of session drummers were used.

The Game's Up yielded no hits, and Netto left the group to establish a solo career, taking Dyche with him. This left Roberts as the sole remaining original member of Sniff 'n' The Tears. He decided to press on, and recruited Les Davidson as the group's new guitarist and added Jamie Lane as the permanent drummer. This five piece line-up (Roberts, Davidson, Lane, South and Taylor) recorded two albums: Love/Action (1981), and Ride Blue Divide (1982). Again no hits were spun off from these albums, and after the contract ended with Chiswick Records, the group broke up in 1983.

Singer–songwriter Paul Roberts went on to make two solo albums for Sonet Records, City Without Walls (1985) and Kettle Drum Blues (1987), while Loz Netto issued singles such as "Fade Away" and "We Touch" with the former being a No. 82 hit on the Billboard Hot 100 and the music video having some airplay on MTV in 1983 while the latter song turned up in an episode of the Miami Vice television show.

== Reformation (1992–present) ==
After a decade of inactivity, Sniff 'n' The Tears were unexpectedly revived in 1992, after the use of "Driver's Seat" in a European advertising campaign pushed the 13-year-old recording to the very top of the Dutch chart in mid-1991. Roberts took the opportunity to assemble a new version of Sniff 'n' the Tears, and took them out on the road in the Netherlands and Germany. This version of the band consisted of Roberts and Davidson, with new recruits Jeremy Meek (bass) (formerly of Live Wire and Amii Stewart's backing band), Steve Jackson (drums) and Andy Giddings (keyboards). This line-up also cut a new studio album in 1992, No Damage Done, which was the first new Sniff 'n' the Tears release in a decade.

"Driver's Seat" was prominently featured on the soundtrack of the 1997 film Boogie Nights and had another popular resurgence as a result. The song also appeared in episode 10 of the second season of The Walking Dead, "18 Miles Out".

The band's next release, 2001's Underground, featured Roberts singing and playing almost everything. He was credited with vocals, guitars, mandolin, harmonica, keyboards, bass and drum programming. However, longtime group member Les Davidson also played guitar on the album, and new member Robin Langridge handled the bulk of keyboard parts.

After another long hiatus, the band released their seventh album, Downstream, in February 2011. The Sniff 'n' the Tears line-up for this album consisted of Paul Roberts (vocals, guitars, bass, keyboard), Les Davidson (guitars), Robin Langridge (keyboards), returning member Nick South (bass) and new member Richard Marcangelo (drums). Marcangelo had previously been a session player on The Game's Up. Jennifer Maidman, who had played bass on Paul Roberts' two solo albums, also played bass on several tracks.

A line-up of Roberts, Davidson, South, Langridge and new drummer Paul Robinson issued the album Random Elements in 2017. While Roberts remained the band's primary songwriter, for this album Davidson and Langridge also received co-writing credits on a number of tracks. Robinson had not only played on 'The Game's Up' but had toured with the group as their drummer in the late 1970s; this marked his official entry into the group 37 years later.

In 2020, Sniff 'n' the Tears (now consisting only of Roberts and Davidson) issued the album Jump, which consisted of new acoustic versions of a number of songs in the band's catalogue (including "Driver's Seat").

== Discography ==
=== Studio albums ===
Year	Album	AUS	CAN	US
1979	Fickle Heart	72	43	35
1980	The Game's Up	-	77	-
1981	Love/Action	-	-	192
1982	Ride Blue Divide	-	-	-
1992	No Damage Done	-	-	-
2002	Underground	-	-	-
2011	Downstream	-	-	-
2017	Random Elements	-	-	-
2020	Jump	-	-	-

=== Compilations ===
Year	Album
1991	A Best of Sniff 'n' the Tears

=== Singles ===
Year	Song	UK	CAN	NED	US	AUS
1978	"New Lines on Love"	-	-	-	108	-
1979	"Driver's Seat"	42	17	8	15	13
1980	"Poison Pen Mail"	-	-	-	-	-
1980	"Rodeo Drive"	-	-	-	-	-
1980	"One Love"	-	-	38	-	-
1981	"That Final Love"	-	-	-	-	-
1981	"The Driving Beat"	-	-	-	-	-
1982	"Hungry Eyes"	-	-	-	-	-
1982	"Como el fuego salvaje (Like Wildfire)" (Spain release)	-	-	-	-	-
1982	"Ojos hambrientos" (Spain release)	-	-	-	-	-
1991	"Driver's Seat"	99	-	1	-	-

== Musicians ==
- Paul Roberts (vocals, acoustic guitar) (in 2001 played bass guitar, mandolin and additional keyboards) 1978–present
- Les Davidson (guitars, background vocals) 1981–1992, 2001–present
- Loz Netto (guitars) 1978–81
- Chris Birkin (bass) 1978–79
- Mick Dyche (guitars) 1978–81 died 2018
- Rick Fenn (guitars) 1980–81
- Nick South (bass) 1980–81, 2011–present
- Jeremy Meek (bass) 1992
- Jennifer Maidman (bass) 2011
- Luigi Salvoni (drums) 1978, rejoined the band briefly in 1992
- Paul Robinson (drums) 1979, 2017–present
- Miffy Smith ( Keyboards) 1981-82
- Steve Jackson (drums) 1992
- Richard Marcangelo (drums) 2011–2017
- Alan Fealdman (keyboards) 1978
- Keith Miller (synthesizer) 1978
- Andy Giddings (keyboards) 1992
- Robin Langridge (keyboards) 2001–present
- Noel McCalla (backing vocals) 1978–80

== See also ==
- List of 1970s one-hit wonders in the United States
