= The Frontmen =

US musical group

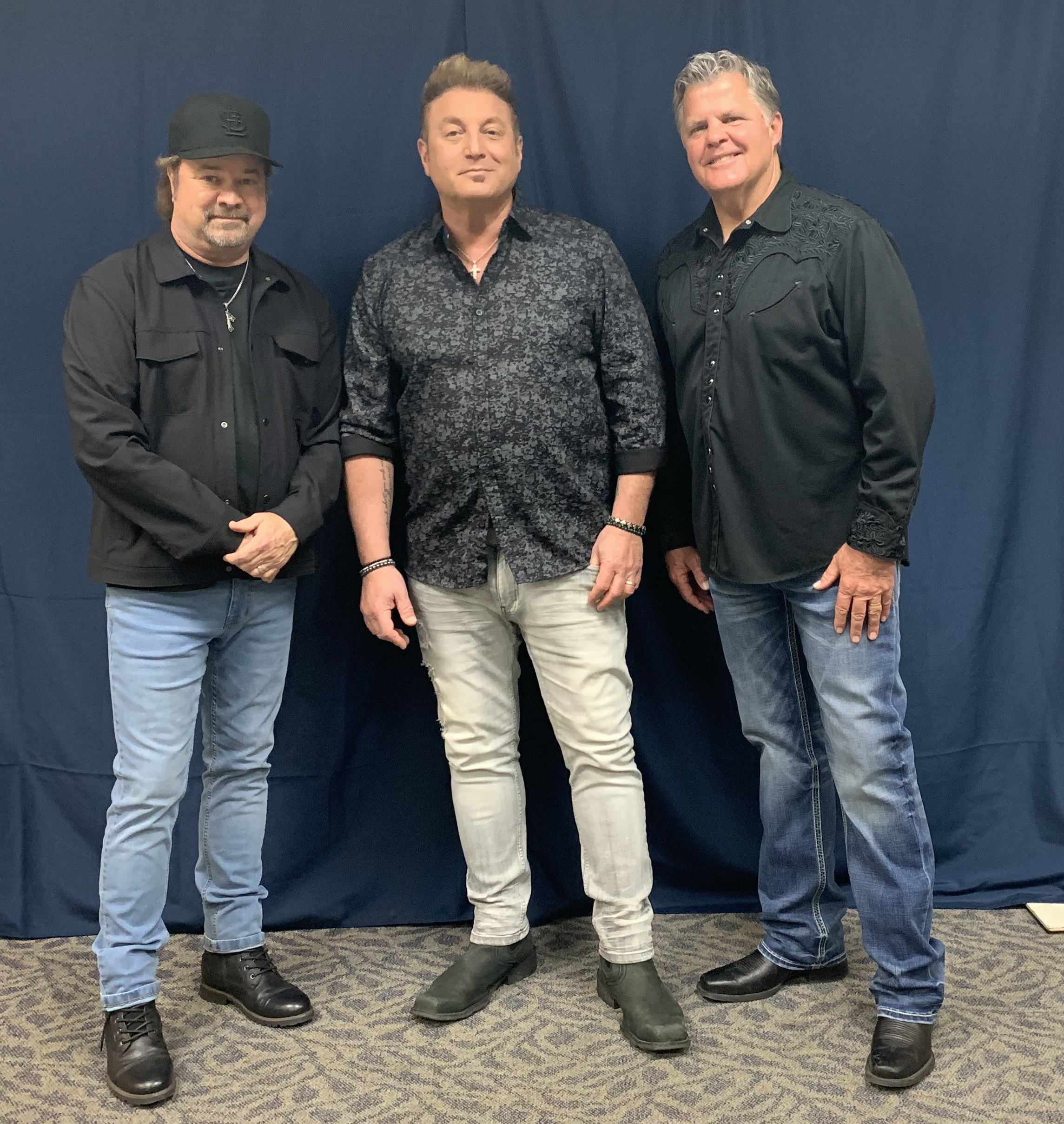
- The Frontmen in Alpena, Michigan, 2026 (L-R: Larry Stewart, Tim Rushlow, Richie McDonald)

Background information
- Also known as: The Frontmen of Country
- Origin: Nashville, Tennessee, U.S.
- Genres: Country
- Years active: 2017–present
- Label: BBR
- Spinoff of: Little Texas; Lonestar; Restless Heart
- Members: Richie McDonald; Tim Rushlow; Larry Stewart

The Frontmen, sometimes credited as the Frontmen of Country, are an American supergroup of country music singers. The group consists of Larry Stewart, Richie McDonald, and Tim Rushlow, who respectively were the former lead singers of Restless Heart, Lonestar, and Little Texas. Initially formed as a touring act, the Frontmen signed to BBR Music Group in 2023.

== History ==
All three members of the Frontmen of Country are known for their roles as lead singers in other country music bands: Richie McDonald of Lonestar, Larry Stewart of Restless Heart, and Tim Rushlow of Little Texas. They began performing impromptu shows for soldiers throughout the 2010s, but began officially promoting themselves as the Frontmen of Country in 2017. One of their first credited performances under the Frontmen name came that same year, where they sang a medley of their hit singles at the inauguration of United States President Donald Trump.

Their first single release was 2018's "If It Wasn't for the Radio", which coincided with a number of tours that year. Despite this, both McDonald and Stewart continued to tour with their respective bands.

McDonald left Lonestar in 2021 to begin performing full-time with the Frontmen. At this point, the trio announced further dates throughout the year.

According to Stewart, the three of them decided to start performing together because of their enjoyment of each other's music. Their performances often include songs from Lonestar, Restless Heart, and Little Texas. In March 2023, the trio signed with BBR Music Group and announced they would begin recording an album produced by Mickey Jack Cones. The album includes a mix of new songs and re-recordings of hit singles from each singer's respective band. In 2023, the trio released two new songs via BBR: "Left Their Mark" and a re-recording of Lonestar's 1999 hit "Amazed". The album, The Frontmen, was released on March 22, 2024.

== Discography ==
=== Studio albums ===
- The Frontmen (March 22, 2024) (BBR Music Group)

=== Extended plays ===
- Familiar Faces (November 17, 2023) BBR Music Group
