= Dean Miller =

American country singer, songwriter and music producer (born 1965)

- Born: Roger Dean Miller Jr. October 15, 1965 (age 60); Los Angeles, California, U.S.
- Origin: Santa Fe, New Mexico, U.S.
- Genres: Country
- Occupations: Singer-songwriter, Music Producer
- Years active: 1997–present
- Labels: Capitol, Universal South, Koch/Audium

Roger Dean Miller Jr. (born October 15, 1965) is an American country singer, songwriter and music producer known professionally as Dean Miller. He is the son of Roger Miller, a country pop artist who had several hit singles from the 1960s through the 1980s. Dean Miller has recorded five studio albums (one of which was not released), in addition to charting four singles on the Hot Country Songs charts and writing singles for Trace Adkins and Terri Clark. His highest-peaking single as a performer was "Nowhere, USA", which reached No. 54 in 1997.

== Biography ==
Although born in Los Angeles, California, Miller was also raised in Santa Fe, New Mexico, and San Antonio, Texas. He got his musical start in local clubs around Santa Fe, before moving back to Los Angeles in the early 1980s and joining a band called the Sarcastic Hillbillies. At the same time, he attended college, in addition to briefly pursuing a career in acting. Miller later moved to Nashville, Tennessee, where he worked as a staff songwriter for Sony/Tree Publishing, and later various other staff songwriter positions.

By 1995, he was signed to the Nashville division of Capitol Records Nashville. Two years later, his eponymous debut album was released on the Capitol label. The lead-off single "Nowhere, USA" received significant airplay in Chicago even before its release date; however, it and two additional singles failed to reach Top 40 on the Billboard Hot Country Singles & Tracks (now Hot Country Songs) charts. Another single, "Wake Up and Smell the Whiskey", was co-written and previously recorded by Brett James, who would later become a popular Nashville songwriter in the 2000s. Miller parted ways with Capitol not long afterward. In 2000, two country artists charted with singles that Miller co-wrote: Terri Clark's "A Little Gasoline" and Trace Adkins's "I'm Gonna Love You Anyway".

In 2002, Miller signed to the newly formed Universal South Records, where he recorded his second album, Just Me. The lead-off single "Love Is a Game" peaked at No. 58, but the album was never released. Universal also released a rendition of "Old Toy Trains", which Roger had written for Dean when he was two years old; this version included Roger's vocals dubbed in on the chorus. Miller later left Universal South's roster as well.

Miller signed to the country music division of Koch Entertainment in 2005. His third album, titled Platinum, was released that same year. This album included the track "Right Now", which the band Rushlow had previously recorded as the title track of their 2003 debut album, as well as the non-charting single "Hard Love". Koch Entertainment closed its country division in 2005, however, and Miller was yet again without a record deal.

== Discography ==
=== Studio albums ===
Title	Album details
Dean Miller	Release date: August 26, 1997; Label: Capitol Nashville
Platinum	Release date: September 6, 2005; Label: Audium/Koch
'Til You Stop Getting Up	Release date: July 8, 2014; Label: Off The Verge
1965	Release date: August 10, 2020; Label: Eupea Music Works
Songs	Release date: TBA; sometime in 2027; Label: Eupea Music Works

=== Extended plays ===
Title	Album details
Stay EP	Release date: December 10, 2013; Label: Off the Verge

=== Singles ===
Year	Single	Peak positions	Album
Year	Single	US Country	Album
1997	"Nowhere, USA"	54	Dean Miller
1997	"My Heart's Broke Down (But My Mind's Made Up)"	67	Dean Miller
1998	"Wake Up and Smell the Whiskey"	57	Dean Miller
2002	"Love Is a Game"	58	Just Me
2002	"Old Toy Trains" (with Roger Miller)	—	single only
2003	"The Gun Ain't Loaded (But I Am)"	—	Just Me
2004	"Carry My Kisses"	—	Just Me
2005	"Hard Love"	—	Platinum
2014	"Begging for a Bullet"	—	'Til You Stop Getting Up
2014	"M Song"	—	
"—" denotes releases that did not chart

=== Music videos ===
Year	Video	Director
1997	"Nowhere, USA"	
2005	"Hard Love"	Dale Resteghini
2014	"Til You Stop Getting Up"	Dean Miller
2018	"Are You Ready for Some Hanky Panky?"	Jim Phelan

=== Other appearances ===
Year	Song	Album
2018	"You Can't Do Me This Way"	King of the Road: A Tribute to Roger Miller
