= Listen to Your Heart (Roxette song) =

1988 song by Roxette

Single by Roxette

from the album Look Sharp!
- B-side: "(I Could Never) Give You Up"
- Released: 27 September 1988
- Recorded: August 1988
- Studio: EMI (Stockholm, Sweden)
- Genre: Alternative rock
- Length: 5:28 (album version); 5:12 (radio edit); 4:05 (single edit)
- Label: Parlophone; EMI
- Songwriters: Per Gessle; Mats Persson
- Producer: Clarence Öfwerman

Roxette singles chronology
"Dressed for Success" (1988)	"Listen to Your Heart" (1988)	"Chances" (1988)

Music video
- "Listen to Your Heart" (original) on YouTube
- "Listen to Your Heart" (remastered) on YouTube

"Listen to Your Heart" is a song by Swedish rock duo Roxette, originally released in Sweden in September 1988 by Parlophone and EMI as the second single from the duo's second studio album, Look Sharp! (1988). It was written by Per Gessle with former Gyllene Tider guitarist Mats "M.P." Persson, and produced by Clarence Öfwerman. The song went on to become one of the most successful singles of 1989, reaching number one in both the United States and Canada around November 1989. The track was the first song to reach number one in the US without a commercially released 7-inch single.

"Listen to Your Heart" originally peaked at number 62 in the UK when it was released there in October 1989. However, following the success of "It Must Have Been Love", the track was reissued as a double A-side with "Dangerous" in August 1990, upon which it reached a chart peak of number six on the UK Singles Chart. Its accompanying music video was directed by Doug Freel and filmed in Sweden. In 2005, Belgian trance act DHT released a remixed version of the song featuring Edmée for their album Listen to Your Heart, which became a top-10 hit in numerous territories, including France, the Netherlands, the UK and the US.

== Composition and style ==
Per Gessle described "Listen to Your Heart" in the liner notes of Roxette's 1995 greatest hits compilation Don't Bore Us, Get to the Chorus! as "The Big Bad Ballad. This is us trying to recreate that overblown American FM-rock sound to the point where it almost becomes absurd. We really wanted to see how far we could take it." Its lyrics were inspired by a close friend of Gessle's, who was in "emotional turmoil, stuck between an old relationship and a new love. A year later, I call him up in the middle of the night after a few too many glasses of champagne, saying 'Hey, you're number one in the States.'"

According to Ultimate Guitar, the track is an alternative rock ballad, with a moderately slow tempo of 86 beats per minute. The verses are made up of three repeating sequences of Bm–G–A and one additional sequence of Bm–G–Em. The first two choruses are composed of two repetitions of a Bm–G–D–A sequence, followed by an extended sequence of D–A–G–D–Bm–G–A–Bm. The bridge consists of E–C♯m–B–A–B–C♯. The final chorus has been modified up by two full tones it consists of two repetitions of D♯m–B–F♯–C♯, followed by a sequence of F♯–C♯–B–F♯–D♯m–B–C♯–D♯m–B, with the final four notes being repeated for the outro.

Seven different versions of the song were released: the original album version; the "Swedish Single Edit", a slightly edited version included on subsequent greatest hits compilations; the "US Remix", used in the music video; the "AC Mix", which is similar to the "US Remix" but with the guitar in the bridge replaced by a saxophone; shorter edits of the aforementioned 2 versions, which cut some parts from the last refrain; and the 7-inch single version, which fades out shortly after the last refrain, omitting most of the outro.

== Critical reception ==
In his review of the Look Sharp! album, Bryan Buss from AllMusic felt the song is "bland" and "overproduced". Pan-European magazine Music & Media commented, "Already doing well in the US, this semi-ballad has all the ingredients of a major worldwide hit. This time it seems that the Swedes have beaten the Americans at their own game." In 1990, David Giles from Music Week called it "another big hit", adding that "this single is anything to go by — it made history by reaching number one despite being available on cassette only."

== Music video ==
Doug Freel directed the song's music video, which was filmed during a live performance at the Borgholm Castle ruin on the Swedish Baltic Sea island of Öland. Freel and the video's production crew believed the ruin to have been created especially for the video. Gessle said: "It took some time to convince them that the place actually was for real." On 14 February 2025, Roxette released a 1080p remastered version of the music video to their official YouTube channel; the remaster uses a different mix of the song from the original version.

The song has been performed on all of Roxette's concert tours. On the Look Sharp! Live Tour and Join the Joyride! Tour, it was performed in its original, power ballad style, although it has been performed in an acoustic version on all tours since the Crash! Boom! Bang! Tour in 1994.

== Formats and track listings ==
All lyrics were written by Per Gessle. All music was composed by Gessle except "Listen to Your Heart" by Gessle and Mats Persson and "Half a Woman, Half a Shadow" by Marie Fredriksson.

- European 7-inch single (Sweden 1363237 · UK EM108)
- European cassette (UK TCEM108)
1. "Listen to Your Heart" – 5:12
2. "(I Could Never) Give You Up" – 3:59
- US 7-inch single (B-50223)
- US cassette (4JM-50223)
1. "Listen to Your Heart" – 5:12
2. "Half a Woman, Half a Shadow" – 3:33
- CD single (UK CDEM108)
1. "Listen to Your Heart" (single mix) – 5:14
2. "Dressed for Success" (new radio mix) – 3:56
3. "(I Could Never) Give You Up" – 3:58
4. "Neverending Love" (live) – 3:31
- CD single (1990 UK and Ireland reissue) (UK CDEM149)
1. "Listen to Your Heart" (Swedish single version) – 5:12
2. "Dangerous" – 3:46
3. "Listen to Your Heart" (US mix) – 4:53
4. "Dangerous" (U.S. club edit) – 3:46

== Credits and personnel ==
Credits are adapted from the liner notes of The Ballad Hits.

Recording

- Recorded in August 1988 at EMI Studios (Stockholm, Sweden)
- Mixed at EMI Studios (Stockholm, Sweden)

Musicians

- Marie Fredriksson – lead and background vocals
- Per Gessle – background vocals, guitar, mixing
- Per "Pelle" Alsing – drums
- Anders Herrlin – programming, engineering
- Jonas Isacsson – electric guitar
- Clarence Öfwerman – keyboards, programming, production, mixing
- Alar Suurna – mixing, engineering

== Charts ==
=== Weekly charts ===
Chart (1988–1990)	Peak position
Australia (ARIA)	10
Austria (Ö3 Austria Top 40)	2
Belgium (Ultratop 50 Flanders)	3
Canada Retail Singles (The Record)	1
Canada Top Singles (RPM)	1
Canada Adult Contemporary (RPM)	5
Europe (Eurochart Hot 100)	15
Finland (Suomen virallinen lista)	12
Ireland (IRMA) with "Dangerous"	5
Italy (Musica e dischi)	8
Luxembourg (Radio Luxembourg)	2
Netherlands (Dutch Top 40)	3
Netherlands (Single Top 100)	5
New Zealand (Recorded Music NZ)	11
Spain (AFYVE)	17
Sweden (Sverigetopplistan)	3
Switzerland (Schweizer Hitparade)	8
UK Singles (Official Charts) with "Dangerous"	6
US Billboard Hot 100	1
US Adult Contemporary (Billboard)	2
US Cash Box Top 100	1
US Adult Contemporary (Gavin Report)	4
US Top 40 (Gavin Report)	1
US Adult Contemporary (Radio & Records)	2
US Contemporary Hit Radio (Radio & Records)	1
West Germany (GfK)	7

Chart (2019)	Peak position
Australian Digital Tracks (ARIA)	31
France (SNEP)	114
Hungary (Single Top 40)	14
Scottish Singles Sales (Official Charts)	39
Switzerland (Schweizer Hitparade)	90
UK Singles Downloads (Official Charts)	59

=== Year-end charts ===
Chart (1989)	Position
Australia (ARIA)	74
Canada Top Singles (RPM)	29
Netherlands (Dutch Top 40)	73
Netherlands (Single Top 100)	75
US Billboard Hot 100	22
US Cash Box Top 100	19
US Adult Contemporary (Gavin Report)	27
US Top 40 (Gavin Report)	25
US Adult Contemporary (Radio & Records)	58
US Contemporary Hit Radio (Radio & Records)	9

Chart (1990)	Position
Belgium (Ultratop 50 Flanders)	98
Europe (Eurochart Hot 100)	99
Germany (Media Control)	45

== Certifications ==
Region	Certification	Certified units/sales
Austria (IFPI Austria)	Gold	25,000^{*}
Denmark (IFPI Danmark)	Platinum	90,000^{‡}
New Zealand (RMNZ)	Platinum	30,000^{‡}
Sweden (GLF)	Gold	25,000^{^}
United Kingdom (BPI)	Platinum	600,000^{‡}
^{*} Sales figures based on certification alone.^{^} Shipments figures based on certification alone.^{‡} Sales+streaming figures based on certification alone.

== Release history ==
Region	Date	Format(s)	Label(s)	Ref.
Sweden	27 September 1988	7-inch vinyl; 12-inch vinyl	Parlophone	
United Kingdom	9 October 1989	7-inch vinyl; 12-inch vinyl; CD	EMI	
United Kingdom	13 November 1989	Cassette	EMI	
Japan	24 January 1990	CD	EMI	

== DHT version ==
"Listen to Your Heart"

Single by DHT featuring Edmée

from the album Listen to Your Heart
- Released: 30 November 2003
- Studio: Studio Omega (Belgium)
- Genre: Trance
- Length: 3:51
- Label: Impart Productions; Hardbounze
- Songwriters: Per Gessle; Mats Persson
- Producers: Flor Theeuwes; Jeffrey Vissers; Thunder Deejay

DHT singles chronology
"Uninvited" (2003)	"Listen to Your Heart" (2003)	"My Dream" (2004)

Music video
- "Listen to Your Heart" on YouTube

Belgian dance group DHT recorded a dance cover of "Listen to Your Heart" with vocals from Belgian singer Edmée. It was initially released on 30 November 2003 as the first single from DHT's debut studio album Listen to Your Heart (2005).

By June 2005, the song had reached number one on the US Billboard Hot Dance Airplay chart and the top 10 on the Billboard Hot 100, peaking at number eight in August. Worldwide, the cover reached the top 10 in the Czech Republic, France, and the United Kingdom while becoming a top-twenty success in Australia, Belgium, Denmark, Ireland, and Norway. The same year, the group also released the "Edmée's unplugged vocal edit", an acoustic ballad version of the song, which also received substantial airplay.

=== Composition ===
The Furious F. EZ version of the song is in the key of B minor with a tempo of 145 beats per minute.

=== Track listings ===
- Belgian CD single (2003)
1. "Listen to Your Heart" (DHT Hardbounze single edit) – 3:32
2. "Listen to Your Heart" (Furious F. EZ radio edit) – 3:52
3. "Listen to Your Heart" (Edmée's unplugged vocal edit) – 4:32
- US CD single (2004)
1. "Listen to Your Heart" (Furious F. EZ radio edit) – 3:48
2. "Listen to Your Heart" (Hardbounze single edit) – 3:30
3. "Listen to Your Heart" (Edmée's unplugged vocal edit) – 4:28
4. "Listen to Your Heart" (Furious F. EZ extended mix) – 4:54
5. "Listen to Your Heart" (Hardbounze extended mix) – 4:45
6. "Listen to Your Heart" (Hardstyle extended mix) – 4:32

=== Charts ===
==== Weekly charts ====
Chart (2003–2006)	Peak position
Australia (ARIA)	11
Australian Dance (ARIA)	2
Belgium (Ultratop 50 Flanders)	15
Belgium (Ultratop 50 Wallonia)	12
Canada CHR/Pop Top 30 (Radio & Records)	3
Czech Republic Airplay (ČNS IFPI)	2
Denmark (Tracklisten)	13
Europe (Eurochart Hot 100)	17
France (SNEP)	7
Germany (GfK)	81
Hungary (Dance Top 40)	30
Ireland (IRMA)	12
Ireland Dance (IRMA)	1
Netherlands (Dutch Top 40)	10
Netherlands (Single Top 100)	10
Norway (VG-lista)	19
Scottish Singles Sales (Official Charts)	5
Switzerland (Schweizer Hitparade)	100
UK Singles (Official Charts)	7
UK Dance (Official Charts)	13
US Billboard Hot 100	8
US Adult Contemporary (Billboard)	6
US Adult Top 40 (Billboard)	13
US Dance Singles Sales (Billboard)	3
US Hot Dance Airplay (Billboard)	1
US Mainstream Top 40 (Billboard)	1

==== Year-end charts ====
Chart (2005)	Position
Belgium (Ultratop 50 Wallonia)	78
France (SNEP)	34
Netherlands (Dutch Top 40)	37
Netherlands (Single Top 100)	34
UK Singles (OCC)	160
US Billboard Hot 100	35
US Adult Contemporary (Billboard)	22
US Dance Singles Sales (Billboard)	9
US Hot Dance Airplay (Billboard)	1

Chart (2006)	Position
Australia (ARIA)	91
Australian Dance (ARIA)	10
UK Singles (OCC)	160

=== Certifications ===
Region	Certification	Certified units/sales
United Kingdom (BPI)	Silver	200,000^{‡}
United States (RIAA)	Gold	500,000^{*}
^{*} Sales figures based on certification alone.^{‡} Sales+streaming figures based on certification alone.

=== Release history ===
Region	Date	Format(s)	Label(s)	Ref(s).
Belgium	30 November 2003	12-inch vinyl; CD	Impart Productions; Hardbounze	
Australia	21 November 2005	CD	Ministry of Sound	
United Kingdom	5 December 2005	12-inch vinyl	Data	

== Yuridia Spanish version ==
- "Habla El Corazón", a Spanish version of the song, was released in March 2007 by Mexican artist Yuridia, who covered the track for her second album of the same name. This version peaked at number 44 on the Billboard Hot Latin Songs chart.
