= DHT (band) =

Belgian dance/trance duo

- Also known as: Dance.House.Trance
- Origin: Brussels, Belgium
- Genres: Eurodance, hi-NRG, progressive house
- Years active: 2002–2010
- Labels: Data; Robbins
- Members: Edmée Daenen; Flor Theeuwes
- Website: www.dhtmusic.com

DHT (sometimes stylized as D.H.T., acronym for Dance House Trance) was a Belgian duo consisting of singer Edmée Daenen (born 25 March 1985 in Kortrijk) and Flor Theeuwes, also known as DJ Da Rick (born 28 August 1976 in Turnhout). It had a hit in the US and Australia in 2005, with its cover version of "Listen to Your Heart", originally recorded by Roxette. The track reached number seven on the UK Singles Chart in December of that year. Marketing of the song often jokingly referenced DHT as an acronym for Definite Hit Track. On 14 June, 2019, the duo unveiled a previously unreleased album, titled #2 on Apple Music, Spotify, and other music portals.

They have been able to achieve the US Billboard Hot 100's top 10 with a trance song.

== Discography ==
=== Albums ===
- Listen to Your Heart (19 July 2005)
- Listen to Your Heart [Dance & Unplugged] (2-disc set) (12 August 2006)
- #2 (14 June 2019)

=== Singles ===
List of singles, with selected chart positions and certifications
Title	Year	Peak chart positions										Certifications (sales thresholds)	Album
Title	Year	AUS	BEL (FL)	FRA	GER	IRE	NLD	NOR	SWI	UK	US	Certifications (sales thresholds)	Album
"True Love"	2002	—	29	—	—	—	—	—	—	—	—		Non-album singles
"Magic Melody"	2003	—	33	—	—	—	—	—	—	—	—		Non-album singles
"Uninvited"	2003	—	33	—	—	—	—	—	—	—	—		Non-album singles
"Listen to Your Heart" (featuring Edmée)	2003	11	15	7	81	12	10	19	100	7	8	BPI: Silver; RIAA: Gold	Listen to Your Heart
"My Dream"	2004	—	39	—	—	—	—	—	—	—	—		Listen to Your Heart
"Driver's Seat" (as Dared)	2005	—	33	—	—	—	—	—	—	—	—		Listen to Your Heart
"Someone"	2006	—	—	—	—	—	—	—	—	—	—		Listen to Your Heart
"I Go Crazy"	2006	—	53	76	—	—	56	—	—	—	—		Listen to Your Heart
"I Miss You"	2007	—	—	—	—	—	—	—	—	—	—		Listen to Your Heart
"Heaven Is a Place on Earth"	2007	—	—	—	—	—	—	—	—	—	—		#2
"Your Touch"	2009	—	—	—	—	—	—	—	—	—	—		#2
"Bonkers"	2010	—	—	—	—	—	—	—	—	—	—		#2
"—" denotes releases that did not chart
