= Driver's Seat =

Single by Sniff 'n' the Tears

from the album Fickle Heart
- B-side: "Slide Away"
- Released: December 8, 1978
- Recorded: September 1978
- Genre: New wave
- Length: 3:59 (album version); 3:42 (single version); 5:48 (12" version)
- Label: Chiswick; Atlantic
- Songwriter: Paul Roberts
- Producer: Luigi Salvoni

Sniff 'n' the Tears singles chronology
"New Lines on Love" (1978)	"Driver's Seat" (1978)	"Poison Pen Mail" (1980)

"Driver's Seat" is a 1978 song by British band Sniff 'n' the Tears, released as a single from their 1979 debut album Fickle Heart. The song reached the top 20 in Australia, Canada, and New Zealand, as well as the top 10 in the Netherlands. Belatedly issued in the United States during the summer of 1979, it climbed to #15 on Billboard Hot 100.

In July 1991, the song made the number one spot in the Netherlands after it was used in a radio and television commercial for the Pioneer car stereo throughout Europe.

== Background ==
The genesis of the song dates back to the mid-1970s when a demo tape was recorded for a French record label that had signed singer-guitarist Paul Roberts. Luigi Salvoni, who had organised the musicians for Roberts, was listening to the demos a couple of years later when he contacted Roberts to ask if he could try and get a deal. At this time, Roberts was concentrating on his career as a painter. Roberts agreed and they signed to indie label Chiswick Records. They recorded the album Fickle Heart with mostly the same musicians that had done the demos which included along with Roberts and Salvoni, Mick Dyche, Loz Netto, Alan Fealdman, Chris Birkin and Keith Miller on Moog. To the surprise of everyone, Fickle Heart did very well and "Driver's Seat" became a hit. According to Roberts, "Driver's Seat" is not about driving, but rather "fragmented, conflicting thoughts and emotions that might follow the break-up of a relationship."

== Commercial performance ==
"Driver's Seat" peaked at number 15 on the US Billboard Hot 100 the weeks of September 29 and October 6, 1979. It reached the top 10 in the Netherlands in November 1980, but its run in the UK was stymied by a strike at the pressing plant, which dried up production.

In Canada, the song reached number 17, and was in the RPM Top 100 for 21 weeks.

"Driver's Seat" was re-released in the Netherlands in 1991. The song hit number one on both the Dutch Top 40 and Single Top 100 charts that same year as a result of its use in a Pioneer commercial.

== Charts ==
=== Weekly charts ===
Chart (1979–80)	Peak position
Australia (Kent Music Report)	13
UK Singles Chart	42
Canadian RPM Top Singles	17
New Zealand Recorded Music NZ (RIANZ)	20
Netherlands (Dutch Top 40)	4
Netherlands (Single Top 100)	8
US Billboard Hot 100	15
Chart (1991)	Peak position
German Media Control	32
Netherlands (Dutch Top 40)	1
Netherlands (Single Top 100)	1

=== Yearly charts ===
Chart (1980)	Position
Netherlands (Dutch Top 40)	45
Netherlands (Single Top 100)	57

Chart (1991)	Position
Netherlands (Dutch Top 40)	16
Netherlands (Single Top 100)	9

== See also ==
- List of 1970s one-hit wonders in the United States
