= Remember... =

Live album by Janis Ian
- Released: January 1978
- Recorded: September 1977
- Venue: Festival Hall, Osaka; Sydney Opera House
- Genre: Pop rock; singer-songwriter
- Length: 82:55
- Label: CBS Japan
- Producer: Ed Sprigg; Janis Ian

Janis Ian chronology
Miracle Row (1977)	Remember... (1978)	Janis Ian (1978)

Professional ratings
Review scores
Source	Rating
SMH 7-day Guide	Favourable
Green Guide Keynotes	Favourable

Remember..., released in Australia under the title In Concert, is the first live album by American singer-songwriter Janis Ian. It was recorded during her 1977 tour of Osaka and Sydney, and released as a double LP in Japan and Australia in 1978, but has never been released in the United States or Europe.

The album was taken from the tour in support of Ian's 1977 album Miracle Row, at a time when she had become much more popular in Japan than she was in the United States – Aftertones had been a number one album in Japan and "Love Is Blind" had topped the charts there for six months. Miracle Row would see her popularity in North America decline even further, and this recording of two 1977 concerts – although no details were ever published as to which recordings came from which – would not be released by Columbia's American or European branches. Ian's first official live album to be issued outside Japan or Australia would not be released until 1999's The Bottom Line Encore Collection.

Remember... includes material from her first four Columbia albums, plus one track from her then-forthcoming 1978 self-titled album and one track, "New York in the Springtime", that remains unique in any form to this release. Her first four albums, which at the time Ian called "a tax write-off for Verve", and 1971's Capitol-issued Present Company are not represented as Janis had by 1977 entirely ceased performing songs from her teenage years.

== Track listing ==
All tracks are written by Janis Ian.

Side one
No.	Title	Studio album from	Length
1.	"Hymn"	Aftertones (1976)	4:19
2.	"When the Party's Over"	Between the Lines (1975)	3:20
3.	"I Want To Make You Love Me"	Miracle Row (1977)	3:03
4.	"Jesse"	Stars (1974)	6:00
5.	"Watercolors"	Between the Lines (1975)	5:12
Total length:			21:54

Side Two
No.	Title	Studio album from	Length
1.	"New York in the Springtime"	not on any studio album	1:38
2.	"In the Winter"	Between the Lines (1975)	3:10
3.	"Applause"	Stars (1974)	4:07
4.	"Party Lights"	Miracle Row (1977)	3:31
5.	"Hotels and One Night Stands"	Janis Ian (1978)	3:33
6.	"Love Is Blind"	Aftertones (1976)	2:24
Total length:			18:23

Side Three
No.	Title	Studio album from	Length
1.	"Medley": "Miracle Row" "Maria" "Let Me Be Lonely" "Boy I Really Tied One On"	Miracle Row (1977) except "Boy I Really Tied One On" from Aftertones (1976)	16:16
2.	"Take to the Sky"	Miracle Row (1977)	6:05
Total length:			22:21

Side Four
No.	Title	Studio album from	Length
1.	"At Seventeen"	Between the Lines (1975)	4:46
2.	"Will You Dance?"	Miracle Row (1977)	4:16
3.	"I Would Like To Dance"	Aftertones (1976)	3:10
4.	"Bright Lights and Promises"	Between the Lines (1975)	8:05
Total length:			20:17

== Personnel ==
- Ed Sprigg – producer, remixing
- Martin Erdmann – engineer
- Gerry Stevens – engineer
- Tom Suzuki – engineer
- Dave Prentiss – assistant engineer
- Carl Gaedt – monitor engineer

=== Musicians ===
- Janis Ian – guitars, keyboards, producer, vocals
- Claire Bay – percussion, vocals
- Barry Lazarowitz – drums
- David Wolfert – guitars
- Stu Woods – bass guitar
