= Janis Ian (1978 album) =

Studio album by Janis Ian
- Released: August 1978
- Recorded: 1977
- Studio: The Hit Factory, New York City
- Genre: Pop rock; folk; contemporary folk; singer-songwriter
- Length: 42:30
- Label: Columbia
- Producer: Joe Wissert

Janis Ian chronology
Remember... (1978)	Janis Ian (1978)	Night Rains (1979)

Janis Ian, also titled Janis Ian II to avoid confusion with her debut album of the same name, is the tenth studio album by American singer-songwriter Janis Ian, originally released in 1978.

Before the release of Janis Ian, the singer had been spending most of her time touring Japan, where her previous studio albums Aftertones and Miracle Row had been much more successful than in the United States, where her early 1978 live album Remember... (Note: Remember... would apart from its Japanese release only be issued in Australia under the title In Concert.) would never be issued. Janis Ian was recorded in late 1977 but not released until her return to the United States in the late summer of 1978, by which time she had been engaged and married to Portuguese novelist Tino Sargo.

When Janis Ian was released, the singer was pleased, and the record at first appeared to be doing well. However, the early commercial promise of Janis Ian faded rapidly, and the album would continue a commercial decline in all territories, reaching only number 120 in the United States and number 97 in Australia.

== Critical reception ==
Professional ratings
Review scores
Source	Rating
AllMusic	2/5 stars
The Tampa Tribune	B

The Globe and Mail wrote: "Perhaps it's the toughness of some of the rhythms that suggests she's hardening a little, but it isn't enough to shake off the soft-spoken image, buttressed as it is throughout the first side and, more quietly, at the end of the second, with that toughness."

== Track listing ==
All tracks are written by Janis Ian.

Side one
No.	Title	Length
1.	"That Grand Illusion"	2:51
2.	"Some People"	3:46
3.	"Tonight Will Last Forever"	2:27
4.	"Hotels and One-Night Stands"	3:37
5.	"Do You Wanna Dance?"	5:07
6.	"Silly Habits"	3:08
Total length:		20:56

Side two
No.	Title	Length
1.	"The Bridge"	4:00
2.	"My Mama's House"	4:04
3.	"Streetlife Serenaders"	4:56
4.	"I Need to Live Alone Again"	3:54
5.	"Hopper Painting"	4:40
Total length:		21:34

== Personnel ==
- Joseph Wissert – producer
- Ed Sprigg – engineer
- John "BJ John" Smith – assistant engineer
- Ted Spencer – assistant engineer
- Mike Reese – mastering
- Ron Frangipane – conductor

=== Musicians ===
- Janis Ian – lead vocals, guitar, keyboards, backing vocals
- Wayne Andre – trombone
- Claire Bay – backing vocals
- Richard Davis – upright bass
- Sal DiTroia – guitar
- Steve Gadd – drums
- Al Gorgoni – guitar
- Artie Kaplan – baritone saxophone
- Jik Malin – percussion
- Jeff Mironov – guitar
- Tony Studd – bass trombone

== Charts ==
Chart (1978)	Peak position
US Billboard 200	120
Australian (Kent Music Report)	97
