= God and the FBI =

Studio album by Janis Ian
- Released: March 21, 2000
- Recorded: 1999
- Studio: Dominion Theatre, London, England; Pedernales Recording, Spicewood, Texas; Sound Emporium (Nashville, Tennessee); Barbara Derwin's house
- Genre: Contemporary singer-songwriter
- Length: 46:00
- Label: Windham Hill
- Producer: John Jennings, Janis Ian, Jim Cregan

Janis Ian chronology
Hunger (1997)	God and the FBI (2000)	Billie's Bones (2004)

Professional ratings
Review scores
Source	Rating
AllMusic	3.0/5 stars
Wilson and Allroy	3.0/5 stars
The Tennessean	4/5 stars

God and the FBI, provisionally titled In Dog Years I'm Dead, is the seventeenth studio album by American singer-songwriter Janis Ian, originally released in 2000 by Windham Hill Records. The album's ultimate title, and the theme of its opening title song, dates from a decade before its release when Ian requested that the FBI files of her parents, who were passionate black civil rights activists, be released to her.

== Background ==
At the time of her making God and the FBI, Ian thought this would be her final album because of poor record sales since her return to recording in the middle 1990s, and her realisation that she could not survive upon playing benefit concerts for causes like Zero Population Growth. Consequently, Ian abandoned the commercial pretensions of previous releases, doing a large portion of the sessions in-house rather than in a studio, and doing ten songs with a single band. Ian did, however, return to working with co-producer John Jennings, who had produced her 1995 album Revenge. Ian stated her hopes that the record could become her fourth comeback album.

== Writing and recording ==
Shortly before she began writing the album, Ian obtained FBI files on her parents and learned that her family had been under surveillance since 1950, before she was born. It had taken Ian ten years to obtain the records via the Freedom of Information Act, until she eventually obtained them "through side channels." Among her family's experiences were the FBI tapping their phone and discouraging schools from hiring or granting tenure to her music teacher father. The investigations ultimately uncovered nothing. Ian wrote the songs as she read the files but commented that her goal was not "to make this whole concept album about the FBI. I don't think the FBI warrants that much attention". She also cited science fiction as an influence on her songwriting for the album, as well as for that of Breaking Silence.

Ian recorded the album in a house in Los Angeles, with the goal of making it as "bunkerlike" as possible. Ian played guitar, piano, and banjo, as well as handling the string and vocal arrangements, while enlisting collaborators including Phillip Clark, Jim Cregan, Marc Moreau, and Chet Atkins. The former three learned some Latin in order to sing the requiem for "On the Other Side". While writing one track, "Memphis", Ian reported finding herself "stuck", so she called fellow singer-songwriter Deana Carter for advice. Carter is credited as a co-writer on the song. Ian and Clark listened to many Brazilian records, particularly from the 1960s Bahia movement, while writing and recording "Murdering Stravinsky".

== Composition ==
The album's opening, title track was inspired by Ian's family's experiences in the 1950s and 1960s, particularly her father's experiences with the FBI. Ian commented that "the song really came from what my father went through [...] I thought I’d turn it into something funny or laughable". One of its verses includes the lyrics "Stay flat, don’t rat/What’s a proletariat/Stalin was a democrat, Washington is where it’s at/Every politician is a sewer of ambition/Hide me, hide you, better hide the baby too/We demand an interview/How long have you been a Jew?/We can make you testify/Freedom is no alibi". The song is styled as a 1980s rock song, with Guardian journalist Robin Denselow deeming it "angry but jaunty".

"On the Other Side" discusses death and includes drum machines and requiem in Latin. "Memphis", a duet with Willie Nelson, is a country ballad co-written with Deana Carter. "Boots Like Emmy Lou's" is a Dixieland-styled tribute to female country artists including Patsy Cline, Loretta Lynn, and Dolly Parton. The song "Play Like a Girl" discusses the experiences of girls in male-dominated fields such as sports and rock music. It includes the lines "I remember when boys told me you play like a girl / It's a matter of genetic history / You can't be in our band you don't play like a man". Ian has called the track "Murdering Stravinsky", which contains the lines "We're murdering Stravinsky, shooting at Ravel/Burying Picasso, slaughtering Caetano", "the musician's Lord of the Flies". It targets subjects from throughout history, including the Bible and Bob Dylan.

== Release ==
The album was Ian's second release on Windham Hill Records. The lead single, "Jolene", was sent to Adult Contemporary and Adult Alternative Airplay radio stations on February 29, 2000.

== Critical reception ==
The Washington Post music critic Geoffrey Himes called God and the FBI "neither Ian's best album nor her worst, but [...] her most diverse".

In a single review of the single "Jolene", Billboard commended the track's jazz stylings and songwriting and suggested that both longtime Ian fans and new listeners could appreciate the song, concluding, "Nice going, Janis."

== Legacy ==
In 2002, John Stroud of the Glenwood Springs Post Independent suggested that the album, especially the title track, took on new relevance in the aftermath of the September 11 attacks "era of Big Brother profiling". Regarding the new resonance of the song, Ian remarked that "It’s interesting how songs do that", and remarked that she hadn't intended for God and the FBI to be more political than her previous work. In 2022, PopMatters' Charles Donovan ranked the album as Ian's tenth-best, remarking that "If any of her second comeback-era albums had the power to break through, it was this one".

Harry Turtledove's 2003 short story, "Joe Steele," which first appeared in the anthology Stars: Original Stories Based on the Songs of Janis Ian, is based on a line from the song: "Stalin was a Democrat." Turtledove eventually expanded the story to novel length, which was dedicated to Ian.

== Track listing ==
All song titles are stylized in lower-case.

All tracks are written by Janis Ian, unless otherwise noted

No.	Title	Writer(s)	Length
1.	"God and the FBI"		4:10
2.	"On the Other Side"		4:26
3.	"Memphis"	Deana Carter, Janis Ian	5:13
4.	"Jolene"	Janis Ian, Jess Leary	4:06
5.	"When You Love Someone"		4:07
6.	"Play Like a Girl"		3:38
7.	"Days Like These"		3:25
8.	"Boots Like Emmy Lou's"		3:53
9.	"She Must Be Beautiful"	Kye Fleming, Janis Ian	4:42
10.	"The Last Comeback"	Philip Clark, Janis Ian	4:49
11.	"Murdering Stravinsky"	Philip Clark, Janis Ian	3:31
Total length:			46:00

== Personnel ==
- Tina Abato – photography
- Larry Greenhill – engineer
- Robert Haynes – engineer
- John Jennings – producer
- Glenn Meadows – mastering
- Sonny Mediana – art direction
- Dave Sinko – engineer

=== Musicians ===
- Janis Ian – vocals, backing vocals, electric guitar, acoustic guitar, upright bass, keyboards
- Philip Clark – electric guitar, acoustic guitar, drums, backing vocals
- Jim Cregan – electric guitar, acoustic guitar, backing vocals
- Marc Moreau – electric guitar, acoustic guitar, backing vocals, engineer
- Willie Weeks – bass guitar

==== Guest musicians on "Memphis" ====
- Willie Nelson – co-lead vocals
- Chet Atkins – lead guitar
- John Cowan – backing vocals
- Steve Gadd – drums
- Matt Rollings – piano
