= Foxes (soundtrack) =

Soundtrack album by Various Artists
- Released: February 1980
- Genres: Pop, rock, disco
- Length: 65:36
- Label: Casablanca
- Producer: Giorgio Moroder

Singles from Foxes
- 1. "Fly Too High" Released: October 12, 1979 (UK); 2. "On the Radio" Released: November 23, 1979 (US); 3. "20th Century Foxes" Released: 1980

Foxes is the soundtrack to the 1980 film of the same name, starring Jodie Foster, Scott Baio, Sally Kellerman, Randy Quaid as well as The Runaways' lead singer Cherie Currie. The double-album was released on the disco label Casablanca Records.

== Album information ==
Foxes was one of two soundtrack albums to be composed and produced by Giorgio Moroder in 1980, the other being American Gigolo which included Blondie's American and British number one hit "Call Me".

The Foxes album contained contributions from some of the biggest names in pop and disco at the time, such as Donna Summer, Giorgio Moroder and Cher, as well as singer-songwriter Janis Ian and the Brooklyn Dreams. With the exception of two tracks by glam rock band Angel, the album was entirely produced and composed by Moroder and also included instrumental tracks which were performed by him and the same team of musicians as on contemporary albums by Donna Summer (Bad Girls), The Three Degrees (3D and New Dimensions) and Sparks (No. 1 in Heaven) as well as on previous soundtracks such as the Academy Award winning Midnight Express (1978): British drummer, songwriter and future record producer Keith Forsey and German keyboardist, composer and also future producer Harold Faltermeyer.

== Singles ==
The biggest hit and best-known track from Foxes is Donna Summer's "On the Radio", released as a single in the autumn of 1979 (#5 Billboard Hot 100, #9 U.S. R&B and #8 on the U.S. Club Play charts). "On the Radio" was also used as the title track of Summer's greatest hits compilation On the Radio: Greatest Hits Volumes I & II which topped the American albums chart in late 1979. The On the Radio album included both the single version ( - 4:06) and a longer version ( - 5:50) of the track. The Foxes soundtrack added two further versions, an extended mix of Summer's vocal recording ( - 7:34) also issued as a promo 12" single, as well as an instrumental ballad version by composer Moroder himself.

Janis Ian's track "Fly Too High", with lyrics by Ian, proved to be another commercial success from the album in 1980. The song became a hit in many countries, including South Africa, Belgium and the Netherlands. The track was later included on her album Night Rains which also contained a second collaboration with Moroder, "Day by Day".

== Release ==
A handful of the recordings on the Foxes soundtrack have been reissued on various CD compilations over the years (Cher's "Bad Love" for example on the international two-disc edition of hits package The Very Best of Cher in 2003),

The complete soundtrack was never officially released on CD until March 2024 in Japan (Republic Records UICY-80429).

== Track listing ==
All music is composed by Giorgio Moroder, except for Side C.

Side A
No.	Title	Lyrics	Performer	Length
1.	"On the Radio (Extended Soundtrack Mix)"	Donna Summer	Donna Summer	7:34
2.	"Fly Too High"	Janis Ian	Janis Ian	5:00
3.	"Shake It"	Bruce Sudano, Joe Esposito, Eddie Hokenson	Brooklyn Dreams	5:40

Side B
No.	Title	Lyrics	Performer	Length
4.	"Bad Love"	Cher	Cher	5:29
5.	"Valley of the Dolls (Instrumental)"		Giorgio Moroder	10:25

Side C
No.	Title	Lyrics	Music	Performer	Length
6.	"20th Century Foxes"	Frank DiMino, Gregg Giuffria	DiMino, Giuffria	Angel	5:24
7.	"Greedy Man"	Keith Forsey	Moroder, Forsey	Keith Forsey	4:47
8.	"Virginia"	Punky Meadows	Punky Meadows	Angel	3:57

Side D
No.	Title	Performer	Length
9.	"On the Radio (Instrumental)"	Giorgio Moroder	4:27
10.	"Hollywood Dreams"	Giorgio Moroder	4:38
11.	"Fly Too High (Instrumental)"	Giorgio Moroder	4:15
12.	"Valley of the Dolls (Slow Instrumental)"	Giorgio Moroder	4:00
