= For All the Seasons of Your Mind =

Studio album by Janis Ian
- Released: October 1967
- Recorded: January 1967
- Genre: Folk-rock; Psychedelic
- Length: 46:25
- Label: Verve Forecast
- Producer: George "Shadow" Morton

Janis Ian chronology
Janis Ian (1967)	For All the Seasons of Your Mind (1967)	The Secret Life of J. Eddy Fink (1968)

Professional ratings
Review scores
Source	Rating
AllMusic	4/5 stars
Wilson and Allroy	3.5/5 stars

For All the Seasons of Your Mind is the second studio album by singer-songwriter Janis Ian, released in October 1967.

== Background ==
Before "Society's Child" became a hit, Ian began work on her second album, which was recorded in January 1967. For All the Seasons of Your Mind was released in October 1967, just after her debut had peaked on Billboard. Like the debut, For All the Seasons of Your Mind addressed controversial topics: "Queen Merka and Me" was one of the first songs written about homosexual love, the single "Insanity Comes Quietly to the Structured Mind" dealt with suicide, and "Shady Acres" was a dark look at home and burial services for elderly relatives.

Unlike with "Society's Child", the controversial lyrics of "Insanity" ensured that single and its parent album would be a major flop: the single peaked at No. 109 and For All the Seasons of Your Mind peaked at No. 179 during a five week stay in the Top 200.

During her period of prominence in the middle 1970s Janis Ian would distance herself from her Verve albums, calling them "a tax write-off for Verve", and apart from one performance of "Insanity Comes Quietly to the Structured Mind" at Southern Illinois University Edwardsville in 1976 she is not known to have performed anything from For All the Seasons of Your Mind since leaving Verve.

== Track listing ==
All tracks are written by Janis Ian.

Side one
No.	Title	Length
1.	"A Song for All the Seasons of Your Mind"	3:24
2.	"And I Did Ma"	4:16
3.	"Honey D'ya Think?"	4:29
4.	"Bahisma"	2:37
5.	"Queen Merka and Me"	4:22
6.	"There Are Times"	4:28
Total length:		23:36

Side two
No.	Title	Length
1.	"Lonely One"	4:14
2.	"Sunflakes Fall, Snowrays Call"	3:59
3.	"Evening Star"	5:02
4.	"Shady Acres"	4:45
5.	"Insanity Comes Quietly to the Structured Mind"	4:49
Total length:		22:49
