= The Secret Life of J. Eddy Fink =

Studio album by Janis Ian
- Released: July 1968
- Studios: Mira Sound Studio, New York City; A&R Studio, New York City
- Genres: Pop rock folk rock
- Length: 42:25
- Label: Verve Forecast
- Producers: George "Shadow" Morton, Janis Ian

Janis Ian chronology
For All the Seasons of Your Mind (1967)	The Secret Life of J. Eddy Fink (1968)	Who Really Cares (1969)

Professional ratings
Review scores
Source	Rating
AllMusic	2.0/5 stars
Wilson and Allroy	2.0/5 stars

The Secret Life of J. Eddy Fink is the third studio album by American singer/songwriter Janis Ian, released in 1968. It was named after Janis Ian’s birth name, and was purportedly a concept album about Janis’ teenage life.

Like her first two albums, it was produced by Shadow Morton, although according to Janis herself he missed the sessions and Janis was credited as co-producer for the only time until her 1977 album Miracle Row.

At the time The Secret Life of J. Eddy Fink was released, the singer had been severely affected by doing cocaine with Jimi Hendrix and Janis Joplin, and would attempt suicide. With Verve giving her very limited support to a recording contract that required an album every eight months, The Secret Life of J. Eddy Fink would continue her commercial free-fall, failing to get near the Billboard Top 200 despite consistent touring throughout 1967 and 1968. Verve even released a song from the debut, "Janey's Blues", as a single in late 1968, in a failed effort to revive her fortunes.

During her period of prominence in the middle 1970s Janis Ian would distance herself from her Verve albums, calling them "a tax write-off for Verve", and her first three albums “lousy”. Although videos of her playing “Look to the Rain” and “Friends Again” in 1968 are included on the 2007 DVD compilation Through the Years: A Retrospective, she is not known to have performed anything from The Secret Life of J. Eddy Fink since leaving Verve, nor has the album ever been represented on any of her compilations.

== Track listing ==
All tracks are written by Janis Ian.

Side One
No.	Title	Length
1.	"Everybody Knows"	2:48
2.	"Mistaken Identity"	7:10
3.	"Friends Again"	1:44
4.	"42nd Street Psycho Blues"	3:53
5.	"She's Made of Porcelain"	2:34
6.	"Sweet Misery"	3:30
Total length:		21:49

Side Two
No.	Title	Length
1.	"When I Was a Child"	3:46
2.	"What Do You Think of the Dead?"	3:21
3.	"Look to the Rain"	5:10
4.	"Son of Love"	3:07
5.	"Baby's Blue"	5:12
Total length:		20:36
