= Who Really Cares (Janis Ian album) =

Studio album by Janis Ian
- Released: September 1969
- Studios: Olmstead Studios, New York City
- Genre: Folk rock
- Length: 33:54
- Label: Verve Forecast
- Producer: Charles Calello

Janis Ian chronology
The Secret Life of J. Eddy Fink (1968)	Who Really Cares (1969)	Present Company (1971)

Professional ratings
Review scores
Source	Rating
AllMusic	4.50/5 stars
Wilson and Allroy	3.0/5 stars

Who Really Cares, released in 1969, is the fourth studio album by American singer-songwriter Janis Ian, and her last for Verve Forecast. Unlike her previous three albums, Who Really Cares was produced not by Shadow Morton but by Charles Calello, who had attracted attention for producing Laura Nyro's Eli and the Thirteenth Confession a year earlier. The title was taken from Ian's first book of poetry, published shortly after the album's release.

At the time she made Who Really Cares, Janis Ian was in a crisis following her initial success with "Society's Child". She had attempted suicide, taken cocaine with Jimi Hendrix and Janis Joplin and seen her parents split as she moved into her own apartment. Her previous album The Secret Life of J. Eddy Fink failed to dent the Billboard albums chart due partly to an unsupportive Verve and partly to her audience moving away from the depressing tone of her albums. She also was originally asked to compose the music for the film Four Rode Out but never did so.

Who Really Cares was almost entirely ignored by the music press upon its release in fall 1969 and failed to return Ian to the top 200, and her contract with Verve was consequently not renewed.

During her period of prominence in the 1970s, Janis Ian distanced herself from her Verve albums, calling them "a tax write-off for Verve", and saying specifically that Who Really Cares "did not contain enough protest songs". Apart from one encore performance of "Time on My Hands" at the Long Center in Scranton, Pennsylvania, on October 29 of 1974, she is not known to have performed anything from Who Really Cares since 1972, nor has the album ever been represented on any of her career compilations.

== Track listing ==
All tracks are written by Janis Ian.

Side one
No.	Title	Length
1.	"Time on My Hands"	2:53
2.	"Snowbird"	4:20
3.	"Love You More Than Yesterday"	3:05
4.	"Orphan of the Wind"	5:06
Total length:		15:24

Side two
No.	Title	Length
1.	"Sea and Sand"	2:49
2.	"Galveston"	3:39
3.	"Do You Remember?"	3:10
4.	"Month of May"	4:29
5.	"Calling Your Name"	4:23
Total length:		18:30
