= Restless Eyes =

Studio album by Janis Ian
- Released: 1981
- Recorded: 1980
- Studio: Sound Labs, Los Angeles
- Genre: Pop/Rock; Folk
- Length: 34:37
- Label: Columbia
- Producer: Gary Klein

Janis Ian chronology
Night Rains (1979)	Restless Eyes (1981)	Uncle Wonderful (1985)

Restless Eyes, released in 1981, is the twelfth studio album by singer/songwriter Janis Ian, and her last album for Columbia Records, (Note: Columbia would issue her next album Uncle Wonderful in Europe in 1995. Uncle Wonderful was recorded between 1981 and 1983 but rejected by Columbia and released nowhere until 1985 and then only in Australia, followed by a New Zealand release in 1986. Although included with Night Rains and Restless Eyes in a 2010 UK Edsel Records two-CD compilation, Uncle Wonderful has never seen US release in any form.) although at the time Ian had a contract with the label for four further albums.

At the time of Restless Eyes, Janis Ian had completely disappeared from the United States charts – her previous album Night Rains had not even dented the Billboard Top 200 despite a re-release during the summer of 1980 and a big push by Columbia who had originally released it on a glutted US market in September 1979. Nevertheless, her efforts to adopt a highly commercial pop sound plus a new focus on writing film music had gained Night Rains significant success outside North America.

For her new album, Ian teamed up with producer Gary Klein, who had produced several hit albums for Barbra Streisand, and she saw Restless Eyes as a move back to her folk roots after the pop of Night Rains. The first single, "Under the Covers", gained publicity in the United States because of its lyrics alluding to the power of Latino lovers, just as "Society's Child" fifteen years previously had depicted interracial relationships. The controversy led Ian to make many appearances on American talk shows at the height of the summer, and despite many radio stations refusing to play the song, "Under the Covers" did gain major airplay in certain other parts of the US; for instance, during mid-July it was the second most played song on one station in Tampa. Although this publicity would make "Under the Covers" Ian's first Top 100 US single since "At Seventeen" and would see her return to the Billboard Top 200 for three weeks, the publicity soon faded and so did both the album and single.

Restless Eyes would nonetheless remain Ian's last charting album in the United States, and indeed her last release there for twelve years, although nothing from Restless Eyes is known to have been performed by Janis in concerts after the album's tour, and only "Passion Play" has ever appeared on any of her compilations.

== Critical reception ==
Professional ratings
Review scores
Source	Rating
AllMusic	2.0/5 stars
The Rolling Stone Album Guide	2.0/5 stars

The Hartford Courant opined that "most of the music is over-orchestrated, unfocused, and undistinguished."

== Track listing ==
All tracks are written by Janis Ian.

Side 1
No.	Title	Length
1.	"Under the Covers"	4:25
2.	"I Remember Yesterday"	4:02
3.	"I Believe I'm Myself Again"	2:31
4.	"Restless Eyes"	3:57
5.	"Get Ready To Roll"	2:58
Total length:		16:53

Side 2
No.	Title	Length
1.	"Passion Play"	4:43
2.	"Down and Away"	3:33
3.	"Bigger Than Real"	3:17
4.	"Dear Billy"	2:47
5.	"Sugar Mountain"	3:25
Total length:		17:45

== Charts ==
Chart (1981)	Peak position
US Billboard 200	156
Australian (Kent Music Report)	57
Netherlands (Dutch Charts)	15
