= Uncle Wonderful =

Studio album by Janis Ian
- Released: 1985
- Recorded: 1981–1983
- Studio: Studio 55, Los Angeles; Track Studios, Los Angeles; Wilder Bros. Studios, Los Angeles
- Genre: Pop rock; folk
- Length: 40:54
- Label: Interfusion
- Producer: Brooks Arthur; Janis Ian; Arti Funaro

Janis Ian chronology
Restless Eyes (1981)	Uncle Wonderful (1985)	Breaking Silence (1992)

Uncle Wonderful is the thirteenth studio album by American singer-songwriter Janis Ian, and her first after departing from Columbia Records. (Note: Columbia would issue Uncle Wonderful in Europe in 1995.)

Recorded between 1981 and 1983 at a time when Janis was seeking a break from the music business after continual recording and touring between 1974 and 1981, according to Society’s Child: My Autobiography Janis cannot recall the details of making Uncle Wonderful, for she was focused upon the death of her grandmother and was consistently travelling from coast to coast. Uncle Wonderful would be rejected by Columbia – with whom Ian at the time had a contract for four more albums – and initially released only in New Zealand in 1985 and Australia in 1986. Uncle Wonderful would not receive a release in Europe until 1995 after Janis’ second comeback with Breaking Silence, and would in 2010 receive a further UK release by Edsel Records as part of a compilation with her two preceding albums Night Rains and Restless Eyes. Although she would return to performing in the United States in 1986, playing mostly her new material in a series of shows supported by the then-unknown Indigo Girls, Uncle Wonderful has never been released there.

== Critical reception ==
The only review of Uncle Wonderful to be published at the time of its issue was by Green Guide journalist Paul Speelman, who did not grade the record but noticed its extremely dark subject matter, with songs about such issues as rape, incest, sexual greed, and the bringing-up of children.

Professional ratings
Review scores
Source	Rating
AllMusic	3.0/5 stars

More recent reviews have been critical of the extremely dated sound but have noticed how Uncle Wonderful’s lyrics foreshadow the topic matter Janis Ian would pursue on her 1990s and 2000s music.

== Track listing ==
All tracks are written by Janis Ian, except where noted.

Side One
No.	Title	Writer(s)	Length
1.	"Just a Girl"		3:41
2.	"Uncle Wonderful"		4:59
3.	"Why Can’t You and I"		4:03
4.	"Trigger Happy Love"	Janis Ian, Amanda Hunt Taylor	4:06
5.	"Heart Skip Too Many Beats"	Janis Ian, Dan Hartman	3:25
Total length:			20:14

Side Two
No.	Title	Writer(s)	Length
1.	"Body Slave"		5:18
2.	"Hit You with the Guilt"	Janis Ian, Kim Bullard	4:16
3.	"Sniper of the Heart"		3:12
4.	"This Night"		4:14
5.	"Mechanical Telephone"		3:40
Total length:			20:40

== Personnel ==
- Janis Ian – vocals, backing vocals, guitar, acoustic guitar, keyboards, piano, producer
- Cyro Baptista – percussion
- Jeff Berlin – bass
- Kim Bullard – keyboards
- Leslie Collman-Smith – backing vocals
- Paulinho Da Costa – percussion
- Kal David – backing vocals
- Howard "Buzz" Feiten – electric guitar
- Artie Funaro – producer, electric guitar, backing vocals
- Tony Horowitz – bass
- Terry Jennings – drum machine, engineer, percussion
- Marv Kanarek – drums
- Chris Page – keyboards
- Peter Schless – keyboards
- Rick Shlosser – drums
- Leland Sklar – bass
- Joe Turano – backing vocals

== Charts ==
Chart (1983)	Peak position
Australia (Kent Music Report)	93
