= The Light at the End of the Line =

Studio album by Janis Ian
- Released: January 21, 2022
- Genre: American folk music
- Length: 46:07
- Language: English
- Label: Rude Girl
- Producer: Janis Ian; Viktor Krauss (co-producer on “Better Times Will Come”); Randy Leago (co-producer on “Resist”)

Janis Ian chronology
Hope (2020)	The Light at the End of the Line (2022)	Live at the Calderone Theater 1975 (2023)

I think hitting 70 was a big part of it. Having the last 15 years to put together songs and wanting to make something that was better than anything I’d done before was involved. Mostly, the timing really worked out. I went into lockdown right around when I needed or wanted to start thinking about this. I had no plans until I looked up at my write board and realized I had 15 songs I was pleased with, and one unfinished. I started listening to what Randy Leago had done with “Resist,” and I began working with Viktor Krauss on “Better Times…”

I had originally intended to do an all-solo acoustic album, but it became clear that I really wanted a blend of it to serve the songs. There wasn’t a sudden, “Gee, I’ll make an album now” decision. There was more a talking to people and seeing where Randy and Viktor’s schedules were. Seeing where John Whelan was. Whether we could get Nuala Kennedy to do her parts from Ireland. Finding a studio where I live, which is near Bradenton, so there’s not a huge amount of studios available. Then just winnowing down the songs and going, “Well, I think this is actually an album.”

—Janis Ian on recording her first studio album of original material in 15 years

The Light at the End of the Line is a 2022 studio album by American folk musician Janis Ian, billed as her final solo studio album. The album has received positive reviews from critics and was intended to be paired with a farewell tour which Ian had to cancel most of due to laryngitis. Ian intended to continue with other creative pursuits, including writing after retiring as a musician. The music was mostly composed in the three years prior to the album being published and was released on Ian's Rude Girl label.

== Reception ==
Liz Thomson of The Arts Desk rated The Light at the End of the Line five out of five stars, praising Ian's songwriting and "striking lyrics", continuing that "the album contains the tenderest of ballads". The site included this among their best albums of 2022, with Thomson encouraging readers to start with this entry in Ian's discography. In Hot Press, Jackie Hayden gave this album a 7.5 out of 10, stating that "Ian's voice belies her age" and he also praised the session musicians. In No Depression, John Amen characterized this release as "Janis Ian moves seamlessly between activistic declarations and descriptive verse, her melodies crystalline, her voice imbued with hard-won wisdom". William Dart of Radio New Zealand's New Horizons called this album one of "unflinching gravitas [which] emanates the glow of a life well lived". In Record Collector, Charles Waring scored this release 4 out of 5 stars, calling it "a sublime epitaph to an extraordinary career". Uncut's Terry Staunton gave this album a 7 out of 10 for combining "senior wisdom" with "headstrong youthfulness".

In 2022, PopMatters published a ranking of Ian's best albums, with The Light at the End of the Line placing eighth and Charles Donovan writing "The Light at the End of the Line is not just a good one – it says goodbye by linking the different phases of Ian’s career. There’s the clever, caustic political bent of her earliest work, the reflective, sophisticated pop of her CBS years, the folk-orientated styles of her 1990s Nashville comeback, and where she stands today. It’s all here."

The Light at the End of the Line was nominated for Best Folk Album at the 65th Grammy Awards.

== Track listing ==
All songs written by Janis Ian.

1. "I’m Still Standing" – 3:13
2. "Resist" – 4:30
3. "Stranger" – 3:05
4. "Swannanoa" – 3:29
5. "Wherever Good Dreams Go" – 4:58
6. "Perfect Little Girl" – 3:18
7. "Nina" – 3:26
8. "Dancing with the Dark" – 3:19
9. "Dark Side of the Sun" – 3:06
10. "Summer in New York" – 3:23
11. "The Light at the End of the Line" – 2:51
12. "Better Times Will Come" – 7:30

== Personnel ==
"I’m Still Standing"

- Janis Ian – vocal, guitars, production
- Viktor Krauss – upright bass, engineering on upright bass
- Randy Leago – cymbals, piano, engineering on percussion and piano, final mixing
- Jon Perry – engineering on vocals and guitars

"Resist"

- Janis Ian – acoustic guitars, main vocal, production
- Jared Anderson – editing, final mixing
- Randy Leago – instrumentation, engineering on Leago's parts, editing, preliminary mixing, production
- Jon Perry – engineering on Ian's parts

"Stranger"

- Janis Ian – vocal, nylon guitar, production
- Randy Leago – harmonica, harmonica engineering, final mixing
- Jon Perry – guitar and vocal engineering

"Swannanoa"

- Janis Ian – lead vocal, acoustic guitars, production
- Jared Anderson – final mixing
- Nuala Kennedy – Irish whistle, harmonies, engineering on whistle and harmonies
- Jon Perry – engineering on vocals and Ian's parts
- John Whelan – button accordion, engineering on accordion, arrangement

"Wherever Good Dreams Go"

Recorded live in Baltimore, Maryland, United States

- Janis Ian – vocal, acoustic guitar, production
- Philip Clark – engineering

"Perfect Little Girl"

- Janis Ian – vocal, piano, production
- Brandon Bell – engineering

"Nina"

- Janis Ian – piano, vocal, production
- Gordon Hammond – engineering

"Dancing with the Dark"

Recorded straight to digital audio tape at Granny White Studios

- Janis Ian – vocal, acoustic guitar, production

"Dark Side of the Sun"

- Janis Ian – vocal, guitar, production
- Gordon Hammond – engineering

"Summer in New York"

- Janis Ian – vocal, piano, production
- Brandon Bell – engineering on piano and vocal
- Randy Leago – clarinet, engineering on clarinet, final mixing

"The Light at the End of the Line"

- Janis Ian – vocals, acoustic guitar, production
- Jared Anderson – mixing
- Trevor Bystrom – engineering

"Better Times Will Come"

- Janis Ian – lead vocals, rhythm guitars, production
- Roy Agee – trombone, banjo
- Jared Anderson – editing, mixing
- Jim Brock – percussion
- Sam Bush – mandolin
- Jeff Coffin – soprano saxophone
- John Cowan – lead vocals, backing vocals
- Maeve Gilchrist – Celtic lever harp
- Vince Gill – acoustic guitar solo
- Jim Hoke – clarinet, baritone saxophone
- Viktor Krauss – upright bass, resonator guitar, synthesizer, percussion, production
- Steven May/BreviT – percussion, synthesizer
- Jim Oblon – electric guitars
- Diane Schuur – scatting solo, backing vocals
- Andrea Zonn – violin, backing vocals

Technical personnel

- Dan Schuman, veer90.com – design
- Piper Payne – mastering at Infrasonic Mastering, Nashville, Tennessee, United States

== Charts ==
Chart performance for The Light at the End of the Line
Chart (2022)	Peak position
Scottish Albums (OCC)	68
UK Americana Albums (OCC)	27
UK Independent Albums (OCC)	37
US Top Album Sales (Billboard)	66

== See also ==
- 2022 in American music
- List of 2022 albums
