= Hunger (Janis Ian album) =

Studio album by Janis Ian
- Released: 1997
- Recorded: Spring 1997
- Studio: Bearsville, Woodstock; The Congress House, Austin; Music Mill, Nashville; Ocean Way, Nashville; Woodland, Nashville
- Genre: Folk, pop rock
- Length: 1:01:33
- Label: Windham Hill
- Producer: Jeff Balding, Janis Ian, Ani DiFranco

Janis Ian chronology
| Revenge (1995) | Hunger (1997) | God and the FBI (2000) |

Professional ratings
Review scores
| Source | Rating |
|---|---|
| AllMusic | 2.5/5 stars |

Hunger is the sixteenth studio album by the American folk singer/songwriter Janis Ian, released in 1997. It is the follow-up to her 1995 album, Revenge. Recording was held in various studios in the spring of 1997. Production for the album was initially handled by an unnamed producer, but disagreements between Ian and the producer caused that producer to leave and Jeff Balding was brought in to finish production work.

== Track listing ==
| No. | Title | Writer(s) | Length |
|---|---|---|---|
| 1. | "Black & White" | Janis Ian | 4:44 |
| 2. | "On the Dark Side of Town" | Janis Ian | 3:54 |
| 3. | "Might As Well Be Monday" | Janis Ian | 4:34 |
| 4. | "Getting Over You" | Janis Ian, Gary Burr | 4:30 |
| 5. | "Searching for America" | Janis Ian | 8:24 |
| 6. | "Hunger" | Janis Ian | 6:27 |
| 7. | "Welcome to Acousticville" | Janis Ian | 7:54 |
| 8. | "Honor Them All" | Janis Ian | 3:56 |
| 9. | "Empty" | Janis Ian, Jim Varsos | 3:11 |
| 10. | "House Without a Heart" | Janis Ian | 4:19 |
| 11. | "Shadow" | Janis Ian | 5:15 |
| 12. | "Getting Over You (with strings)" | Janis Ian, Gary Burr | 4:25 |

== Personnel ==
=== Production ===
- Janis Ian – producer
- Jeff Balding – producer, mixing
- Ani DiFranco – producer ("Searching for America")
- Andrew Gilchrist – mixing ("Searching for America")
- Sonny Mediana – art direction and design

=== Musicians ===
- Janis Ian – vocals, acoustic guitar
- Cyro Baptista – percussion
- Kevin Breit – electric and National Steel guitars, bazoukis
- David Piltch – upright bass
- Ani DiFranco – background vocals, bass, sampling ("Searching for America")
- Andrew Gilchrist – electric guitar ("Searching for America")
- Andy Stochansky – drums, percussion ("Searching for America")
- Steve Brewster – drums ("Honor Them All")
- Dann Huff – electric guitar ("Honor Them All")
- Randy Leago – accordion ("Honor Them All")
- Terry McMillian – percussion ("Honor Them All")
- Glenn Worf – upright bass ("Honor Them All")
- Ron Huff – ("Getting Over You")
