= Fly Too High =

Single by Janis Ian

from the album Night Rains
- B-side: "Night Rains"
- Released: October 12, 1979 (UK)
- Recorded: 1979
- Genre: Pop
- Label: Columbia Records
- Songwriters: Janis Ian, Giorgio Moroder
- Producer: Harold Faltermeyer

Janis Ian singles chronology
"You Are Love" (1979)	"Fly Too High" (1979)	"Here Comes the Night" (1980)

"Fly Too High" is a song by Janis Ian. It is a track from her 1979 LP, Night Rains.

The song became a modest hit in the UK (#44), a major hit in Australia (#7) and The Netherlands (#5), and a number-one hit in South Africa.

"Fly Too High" was written and recorded for the film Foxes, and it is included on the soundtrack.

== Chart history ==
=== Weekly charts ===
Chart (1979–1980)	Peak position
Australia (Kent Music Report)	7
Belgium (Ultratop 50 Flanders)	2
Netherlands (Dutch Top 40)	5
Netherlands (Single Top 100)	8
New Zealand (Recorded Music NZ)	5
South Africa (Springbok Radio)	1
UK Singles (OCC)	44
US Billboard Dance Club Songs	30
Quebec (ADISQ)	3

=== Year-end charts ===
Chart (1980)	Position
Australia (Kent Music Report)	33
Netherlands (Single Top 100)	62
New Zealand (Recorded Music NZ)	39
South Africa (Springbok Radio)	16
