= Oscar Benton =

Dutch vocalist (1949–2020)

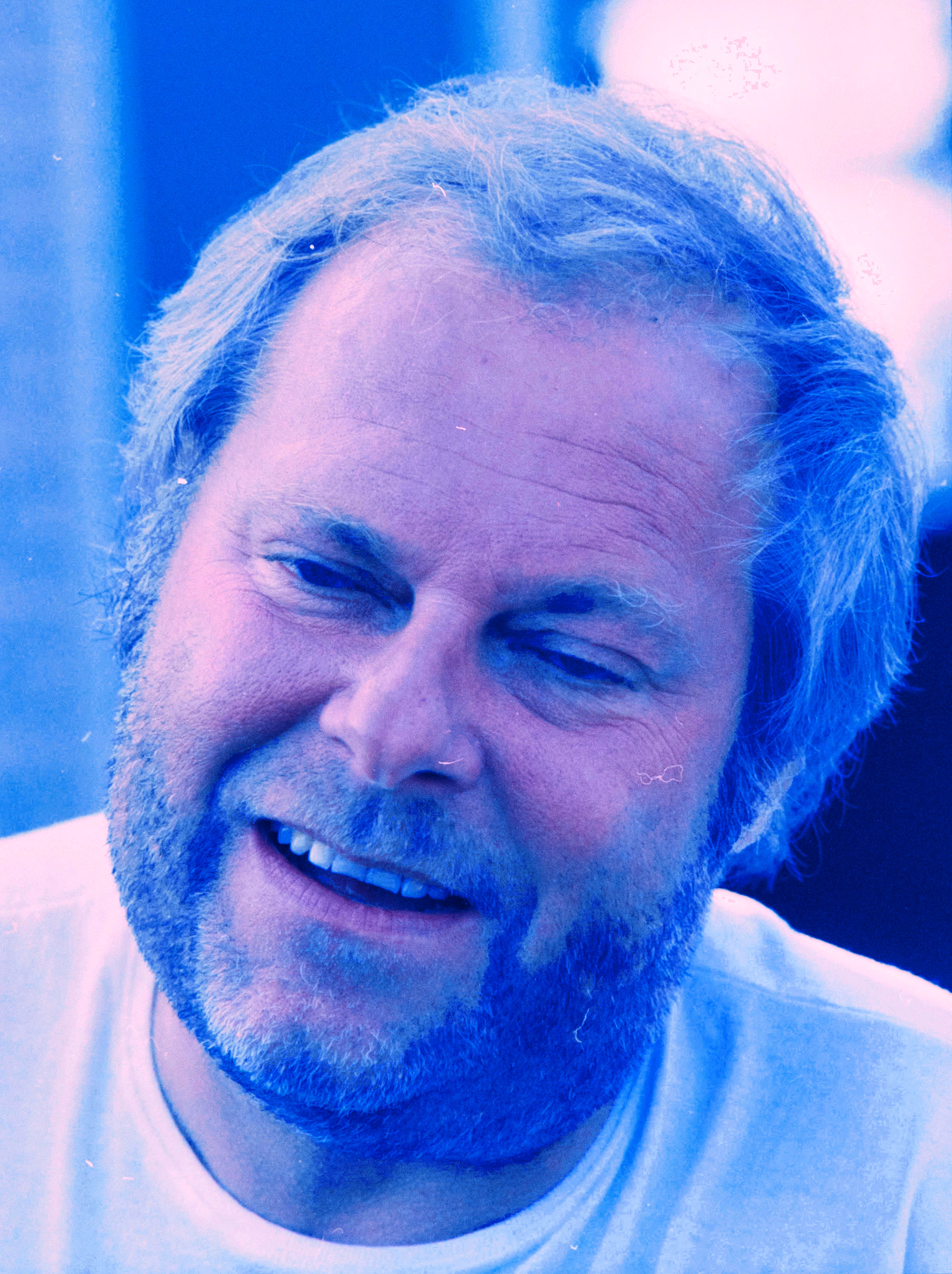

Background information
- Born: Ferdinand van Eis; 3 February 1949; Haarlem, Netherlands
- Died: 8 November 2020 (aged 71) IJmuiden, Netherlands
- Genres: Blues, pop
- Years active: 1960s–1980s
- Labels: Decca, Philips, DGG Records, Pathé Records
- Website: www.oscar-benton.com

Oscar Benton (born Ferdinand van Eis; 3 February 1949 – 8 November 2020) was a Dutch vocalist. He was also the founder of the Oscar Benton Blues Band in 1967. The band rose to fame in 1968 by being a runner up in the Jazz Festival, Loosdrecht, the Netherlands.

== Personal life ==
Benton was born on 3 February 1949 in Haarlem. He studied mandolin and the violin at the conservatory.

On 8 November 2020, Benton died in IJmuiden at the age of 71.

== Career ==
=== Oscar Benton Blues Band ===
In 1968, the Oscar Benton Blues Band released its first album, Feel so good. In 1969, they released the album The Blues Is Gonna Wreck My Life. In 1971, they released Benton ‘71.

=== Monica and Oscar Benton ===
He recorded two hit singles with the Dutch singer Monica Verschoor as "Monica and Oscar Benton" in the 1970s.

=== Blue Eyed Baby Band ===
In 1974, the band changed members and also the name by becoming Blue Eyed Baby. Oscar himself changed his stage name to Billy Boy Bishop. The "Blue Eyed Baby" released the LP Blue Eyed Baby.

=== Solo ===
Oscar released his 1981 homonymous album the Bensonhurst Blues, written by Artie Kaplan and Artie Kornfeld, and produced by the EMI Records. The Bensonhurst Blues, which is considered to be Oscar’s best hit, was part of the soundtrack of the 1999 movie La Bûche.

Earlier it was on the soundtrack of the film Pour la peau d'un flic (1981) which features Alain Delon. The earliest version of that song is that of Artie Kaplan in his 1973 album Confessions Of A Male Chauvinist Pig produced by the Hopi Records. The Italian singer Adriano Celentano, in his 2004 album C’é Sempre un Motivo, included an Italian version, named Vengo del Jazz. The single became a number one hit in France in December 1981, and the album was certified gold. A famous Romanian singer, Margareta Pâslaru, sings it in Romanian under the title Spuneam că nu-mi pasă (Bui bui bui). Another Romanian singer Aurelian Andreescu also recorded a Romanian language version of this song titled Îndrăgostitul. The song became the musical theme of the TV show Crazy Horse in the early 2000s.

In 2011, he released his CD album, Oscar Benton is Still Alive.

Starting in 2016, guitarist Johnny Laporte and Oscar Benton recorded a new album titled "I Am Back". It was released on CD, Vinyl and as a digital album in 2018.

== Discography ==
=== Albums ===
Year	Title	Label
1981	Bensonhurst Blues	Pathé Records
1983	My Kind Of Blues	Polydor
1984	If You Go Away	Folegandros
1994	Best Part Of My Life	SilenZ Records
2018	I Am Back	

=== Singles & EPs ===
Year	Title	Label
1972	Everybody Is Telling Me	Imperial
1972	All I Ever Need Is You	Imperial
1973	Bensonhurst Blues	Pathé
1974	My Children, My Wife composed by Charles Segal, pianist	[EMI distribution]
1981	Bensonhurst Blues	EMI
1982	I Believe In Love	Bleu Blanc Rouge, Carrere
1983	Not The Same Dreams Anymore	Biram
1983	Not The Same Dreams Anymore	Bleu Blanc Rouge
1983	Woolly Boolly Boogie	EMI
1984	If You Go Away (Ne Me Quite Pas)	Bleu Blanc Rouge
1986	Ooh What A Night!	Biram
1996	Ze Is Zoals Jij	Columbia
