= Bensonhurst Blues =

1973 song performed by Oscar Benton

"Bensonhurst Blues" is a song written by Artie Kaplan and Artie Kornfeld. It was originally released in 1971 on Kaplan's album Confessions Of A Male Chauvinist Pig.

Oscar Benton went on to record the song in 1973 for his Bensonhurst Blues album and again, eight years later, for the soundtrack for the French film Pour la peau d'un flic. The latter version was subsequently released by EMI Records and enjoyed success in Europe. One of Benton's recordings also appears in the 1999 film La Bûche.

Bensonhurst Blues has been recorded in several different languages. Adriano Celentano included an Italian language version of the song („Vengo Dal Jazz“) on his 2004 album, C'è sempre un motivo. The song has been recorded in Romanian by both Margareta Pâslaru and Aurelian Andreescu. Singer Dimitri Tambossis released a Greek version of the song in 1982. In 1977, Lili Ivanova Bulgaria recorded her version.

== See also ==
- Oscar Benton
- Bensonhurst, Brooklyn
