= Stars (Janis Ian album) =

Studio album by Janis Ian
- Released: February 1974
- Recorded: March 1972 – 1973
- Studio: 914 Sound Studios; Sound Recorders, Los Angeles; Sound Studios, New York State
- Genre: Folk
- Length: 35:31
- Label: Columbia
- Producer: Brooks Arthur

Janis Ian chronology
Present Company (1971)	Stars (1974)	Between the Lines (1975)

Professional ratings
Review scores
Source	Rating
AllMusic	4.0/5 stars
Wilson and Allroy	3.0/5 stars
Rolling Stone Album Guide (1992)	2.0/5 stars

Stars is the sixth studio album by American singer-songwriter Janis Ian, and the first of her seven for Columbia Records. Ian had previously had a three-year hiatus from the music industry since her 1971 album Present Company. In two years away from the music business, Ian wrote over 100 songs after moving to Los Angeles. She returned to play at the Philadelphia Folk Festival on August 17, 1973, and was signed by Columbia Records after several other companies rejected the songs she had written.

While Stars was being recorded, the song "Jesse" became a hit for Roberta Flack.

The album itself became Ian's most successful since her debut, peaking at number 63 on the Billboard Top LPs & Tape chart.

== Track listing ==
All tracks are written by Janis Ian.

One Side
No.	Title	Length
1.	"Stars"	7:12
2.	"The Man You Are in Me"	2:59
3.	"Sweet Sympathy"	2:42
4.	"Page Nine"	3:07
5.	"Thankyous"	2:40
Total length:		17:40

Another Side
No.	Title	Length
1.	"Dance with Me"	3:18
2.	"Without You"	2:04
3.	"Jesse"	4:07
4.	"You’ve Got Me on a String"	3:20
5.	"Applause"	4:02
Total length:		16:51

== Personnel ==
- Produced by Brooks Arthur
- Engineered by Brooks Arthur, Larry Alexander, Charlie Dreyer
- Art Direction and Design: John Berg, Paul Perlow
- Photography: Peter Cunningham
- Production Coordinator: Herb Gart

=== Musicians ===
- Janis Ian – vocals, guitar, 12-string guitar, acoustic guitar, piano, Fender Rhodes
- Larry Alexander – drums, tambourine
- Raymond Beckenstein – soprano saxophone
- Ralph Casale – acoustic guitar
- Richard Davis – arranger, bass, pizzicato bass
- George Devens – vibraphone
- Sal DiTroia – acoustic guitar, rhythm guitar, backing vocals
- George Duvivier – bass
- Jack Jennings – percussion
- Barry Lazarowitz – arranger, drums, percussion
- Gene Orloff – violin
- Hugh McCracken – electric guitar
- Don Payne – bass
- Romeo Penque – saxophone
- Al Rogers – drums
- Allan Schwartzberg – drums
- John Tropea – acoustic guitar
- Eric Weissberg – electric guitar, acoustic guitar, 12-string acoustic guitar

==== Orchestra ====
- Bob Abernathy – French horn
- Seymour Barab – celli
- Seymour Berman – viola
- Phil Bodner – alto flute, alto saxophone
- Ariana Bronne – violin
- Alfred Brown – viola
- James Buffington – French horn
- Frederick Buldrini – violin
- Don Butterfield – tuba
- Earl Chapin – French horn
- Selwart Clarke – viola
- Léon Cohen – clarinet
- Burt Collins – trumpet
- Joseph DeAngelis – French horn
- Peter Dimitriades – violin
- Paul Faulise – bass trombone
- Ron Frangipane – arranger, conductor, piano
- Mickey Gravine – tenor trombone
- Marie Hence – violin
- Wally Kane – bassoon
- Artie Kaplan – orchestra manager
- Harold Kohon – violin
- Bhen Lanzarone – celesta
- Gloria Lanzarone – celli
- Archie Levin – viola
- Joseph Malin – violin
- Richard Maximoff – viola
- Charles McCracken – celli
- Lloyd Michaels – trumpet
- Romeo Pengue – clarinet, flute, oboe
- Alan Raph – baritone horn
- George Ricci – celli, cello soloist
- Alan Rubin – trumpet
- David Sackson – viola
- Julius Schacter – violin
- Joe Shepley – solo trumpet
- Joseph J. Shepley – French horn
- Bill Watrous – tenor trombone

== Charts ==
Chart (1974)	Peak position
US Billboard 200	63
Australian (Kent Music Report)	82
