= Revenge (Janis Ian album) =

Studio album by Janis Ian
- Released: May 16, 1995
- Recorded: 1994
- Studio: Sound Emporium (Nashville, Tennessee)
- Genre: Pop rock
- Length: 51:54
- Label: Beacon Records
- Producer: John Jennings, Janis Ian

Janis Ian chronology
| Simon Renshaw Presents: Janis Ian Shares Your Pain (1995) | Revenge (1995) | Hunger (1997) |

Professional ratings
Review scores
| Source | Rating |
|---|---|
| AllMusic | 3/5 stars |

Revenge is the fifteenth studio album by American singer-songwriter Janis Ian, released in 1995. Like her preceding comeback album Breaking Silence, it was recorded in Nashville, Tennessee, where Ian had been living since 1988. The title was intended as a riposte against the major record labels who had dropped her permanently after her past few albums had failed to sell in substantial numbers. Despite this, Janis and co-producer John Jennings hired what she considered her “dream band” for the sessions, and when Revenge was completed Janis considered it the most commercial album she had ever recorded. It included one song co-written with Linda Perry of 4 Non Blondes.

Revenge was originally released as the first album on a new Los Angeles independent label called Beacon Records; however, the project collapsed soon after the album came out, and the album would be put out by a variety of labels, amongst them her old Columbia and Festival. The album was not as well received critically as Breaking Silence, although "Stolen Fire", "Take No Prisoners", "Take Me Walking in the Rain", " "Berlin" and "Ruby" would all appear on subsequent live albums and career-spanning compilations. Closing track "When Angels Cry" was sung in some episodes of the soap opera General Hospital.

== Track listing ==
All tracks are written by Janis Ian, except where noted.

| No. | Title | Writer(s) | Length |
|---|---|---|---|
| 1. | "Ready For the War" | | 4:21 |
| 2. | "Take No Prisoners" | | 3:51 |
| 3. | "Tenderness" | Janis Ian, Buddy Mondlock | 3:44 |
| 4. | "No One Else Like You" | Janis Ian, Amanda Hunt Taylor | 3:41 |
| 5. | "Davy" | | 3:53 |
| 6. | "When the Silence Falls" | | 2:30 |
| 7. | "Take Me Walking in the Rain" | Janis Ian, Jenny Yates | 6:50 |
| 8. | "Berlin" | Janis Ian, Linda Perry | 3:51 |
| 9. | "Stolen Fire" | | 4:10 |
| 10. | "Ruby" | Janis Ian, Kye Fleming | 4:21 |
| 11. | "The Mission" | Janis Ian, Kye Fleming | 5:57 |
| 12. | "When Angels Cry" | | 4:45 |
| Total length: | | | 51:54 |
