= Present Company =

Studio album by Janis Ian
- Released: 1971
- Recorded: November–December 1970
- Studio: Sierra Sound Laboratories, Berkeley, California
- Genre: Pop rock
- Length: 37:47
- Label: Capitol
- Producer: Jerry Corbitt

Janis Ian chronology
Who Really Cares (1969)	Present Company (1971)	Stars (1974)

Professional ratings
Review scores
Source	Rating
AllMusic	4/5 stars
Wilson and Allroy	2.5/5 stars
Rolling Stone Album Guide (1992)	1/5 stars

Present Company is the fifth studio album by singer-songwriter Janis Ian, and her solitary album for Capitol Records.

In 1970, after her break-up with original producer Shadow Morton, and the failure of her final two Verve albums The Secret Life of J. Eddy Fink and Who Really Cares to dent the Billboard albums chart, Ian moved to California and continued writing songs. In the autumn of 1970, Ian began working without a recording contract with producer and musician Jerry Corbitt (of The Youngbloods) in California before signing with Capitol Records in January. The sixteen songs, including three songwriting collaborations with Peter Cunningham, were released as Present Company early in 1971.

Despite a lengthy period of touring extending into early 1972, Present Company did not sell much better than its two predecessors, although it did "bubble under" the top 200. Janis' contract with Capitol was not renewed, and apart from the single "He's a Rainbow" being performed during the tour in support of her comeback album Stars, nothing from Present Company is known to have been played live since 1972, nor has the album ever been represented on any of Janis Ian's compilations.

== Track listing ==
All tracks are written by Janis Ian, except where noted.

Side One
No.	Title	Writer(s)	Length
1.	"The Seaside"		1:02
2.	"Present Company"		2:02
3.	"See My Grammy Ride"		1:58
4.	"Here in Spain"	Peter Cunningham, Janis Ian	2:22
5.	"On the Train"		1:36
6.	"He's a Rainbow"		3:14
7.	"Weary Lady"		4:00
Total length:			16:14

Side Two
No.	Title	Writer(s)	Length
1.	"Nature's at Peace"	Peter Cunningham, Janis Ian	2:30
2.	"See the River"		0:36
3.	"Let It Run Free"	Peter Cunningham, Janis Ian	2:31
4.	"Alabama"		4:27
5.	"Liberty"		1:07
6.	"My Land"		3:38
7.	"Hello Jerry"		1:33
8.	"Can You Reach Me?"		3:07
9.	"The Sunlight"		1:04
Total length:			21:33
