= Night Rains =

Studio album by Janis Ian
- Released: September 1979
- Recorded: 1978
- Studios: A & R Studios, New York City; CBS Recording Studios, New York City; Musicland, Munich, West Germany; Rusk Sound, Los Angeles, California; The Hit Factory, New York City
- Genre: Disco
- Label: Columbia
- Producers: Janis Ian, Ron Fragipane; Giorgio Moroder

Janis Ian chronology
Janis Ian (1978)	Night Rains (1979)	Restless Eyes (1981)

Night Rains is the eleventh studio album by American singer-songwriter Janis Ian, released in 1979 on Columbia Records.

The commercial failure of her previous self-titled album and its accompanying singles led Columbia to demand Ian make a major change of direction for Night Rains to restore her commercial fortunes. She initially focused on writing film music for Foxes and The Bell Jar, and then adopted a fully commercial pop sound, collaborating with Albert Hammond of "It Never Rains in Southern California" fame on one song and with superstar disco producer Giorgio Moroder on two tracks including the Foxes theme. E Street Band saxophonist Clarence Clemons played on two songs and jazz pianist Chick Corea on "Jenny (Iowa Sunrise)".

Consequent upon its release alongside twenty-four other Columbia Records albums in the fall of 1979, Night Rains was effectively un-promoted by the label in the United States and became Ian's first to not dent the Billboard albums chart since Present Company. Even a re-release a year later with much greater record company promotion failed to get Night Rains onto the chart.

Although first single "Here Comes the Night" (Theme from The Bell Jar) did not chart anywhere, second single "Fly Too High" became a top ten hit in the Netherlands, Australia and New Zealand, and drove Night Rains into the top twenty in those markets. "Fly Too High" and third single "The Other Side of the Sun" also became Ian's first-ever chart entries in the United Kingdom, although Night Rains did not crack the top 75 albums.

Subsequent to Ian's 1990s comeback, "Fly Too High" and "Jenny (Iowa Sunrise)" have remained part of her live setlist, and both those songs have appeared on career-spanning compilations.

== Critical reception ==
Professional ratings
Review scores
Source	Rating
AllMusic	2/5 stars
Omaha World-Herald	3/5 stars
The Rolling Stone Album Guide	2/5 stars

The Omaha World-Herald wrote that Ian's "tender, painful, usually affectedly serious lyrics too often end up a bit corny."

== Track listing ==
All tracks are written by Janis Ian, except where noted.

Side one
No.	Title	Writer(s)	Produced by	Length
1.	"The Other Side of the Sun"	Albert Hammond, Janis Ian	Janis Ian, Ron Fragipane	3:59
2.	"Fly Too High"	Janis Ian, Giorgio Moroder	Giorgio Moroder	5:10
3.	"Memories"		Janis Ian, Ron Fragipane	4:46
4.	"Night Rains"		Janis Ian, Ron Fragipane	3:24
5.	"Here Comes the Night" (Theme from The Bell Jar)		Janis Ian, Ron Fragipane	3:37
Total length:				20:56

Side two
No.	Title	Writer(s)	Produced by	Length
1.	"Day by Day"	Janis Ian, Giorgio Moroder	Janis Ian, Ron Fragipane	4:14
2.	"Have Mercy Love"		Janis Ian, Ron Fragipane	4:38
3.	"Lay Low"		Janis Ian, Ron Fragipane	3:06
4.	"Photographs"		Janis Ian, Ron Fragipane	2:47
5.	"Jenny (Iowa Sunrise)"		Janis Ian, Ron Fragipane	3:32
Total length:				18:17

== Charts ==
Chart (1979/1980)	Peak position
Australia (Kent Music Report)	11
New Zealand	11
Netherlands (Dutch Charts)	2

== Certifications ==
Region	Certification	Certified units/sales
Australia (ARIA)	Platinum	50,000^{^}
^{^} Shipments figures based on certification alone.
