= Artie Kaplan =

American singer (1935–2025)

- Born: Arthur William Kaplan; October 28, 1935; New York City, U.S.
- Died: October 11, 2025 (aged 89) Boca Raton, Florida, U.S.
- Genres: Jazz, pop
- Occupations: Musician, composer
- Instruments: Saxophone, flute
- Years active: 1960–2025

Arthur William Kaplan (October 28, 1935 – October 11, 2025) was an American recording artist, songwriter and a session musician. He had also been a music contractor where he was hired to musicians for sessions. In the 1960s, he was casting musicians for sessions for Aldon Music. When musician Joe Delia was asked about the best advice he had ever had, he said it was from Kaplan, who said "Always show up on time and bring a pencil."

== Background ==
Kaplan graduated from Lafayette High School, after which he served in the Army. Kaplan was a singer-songwriter, producer and composer and the instruments he played were saxophone, clarinet, flute and piccolo. His saxophone playing and solos could be heard on over 150 songs that made it to the top 10. The songs he has played on are "1-2-3" by Len Barry, "The Locomotion" by Little Eva, "Mandy" by Barry Manilow, "Breaking Up is Hard to Do" by Neil Sedaka and "Sunday Will Never Be the Same" by Spanky & Our Gang.

In 1972, he released an album with the title Confessions of a Male Chauvinist Pig. In a studio news summary, Billboard's Sam Sutherland referred to it as "an eyebrow raising project" that Chris Dedrick (of The Free Design) and Mort Ross were working on.

Kaplan died on October 11, 2025, at the age of 89.

== Songwriting ==
Kaplan co-wrote the song "Harmony" with Norman Simon which appeared on his 1972 album Confessions of a Male Chauvinist Pig. It has been covered by Ray Conniff and the Singers and appeared on their album of the same title.

Along with Artie Kornfeld, Kaplan co-wrote "Bensonhurst Blues", which was a hit for Dutch singer Oscar Benton. Other songs he has written are "My First and Only Lover" which was recorded by Nat "King" Cole and "It's Been a Long Time" which has been recorded by Eric Faulkner.

== Discography ==
=== Singles ===
- "Harmony" / "God Fearin' Man" – Interfusion – 1972 (New Zealand)
- "Harmony" / "Stay Don't Go" – CBS – CBS 1189 – 1973 (Germany)
- "Bensonhurst Blues" / "Music Is Sweet Music in My Soul" – Riviera 121470 – 1973 (France)
- "Down by the Old Stream" / "I Wanna Go To Coney Island with My Grandma" – Paramount 0276 (1974)
- "Rock And Roll Is Here To Stay" / " Livin' Ain't So Easy" – Soedi – SOJ 640001 – 1981 (Italy)
- "Music Is Sweet Music to My Soul" / "Yours Is The Song" – Philips 6017 308 – 1982 (Netherlands)

=== Albums ===
- Confessions of a Male Chauvinist Pig – Hopi VHS 901 – 1972
- Down By the Old Stream – Paramount PAS-1019 – 1974
- My Name Is Artie Kaplan – K-Tel – TI 183 (Italy)

=== Compilation albums ===
- My Songs – CBS – S 65829 – 1973 (Italy)
- Greatest Hits – Edigsa – 01L0337 – 1982 (Spain)

=== CD albums ===
- Fun Time for Kids w/Artie Kaplan
- Confessions of a Male Chauvinist Pig
- I'm Just the Singer in the Band
- Barnyard Stories and Poems
- Down by the Old Stream

== Session work ==
=== Singles ===
- Connie Francis – "My Heart Has a Mind of Its Own" – Soprano saxophone
- Neil Sedaka – "Breaking Up Is Hard to Do" – Saxophone

=== Albums ===
- Nat Adderley – Sayin' Somethin' – saxophone
- Janis Ian – Between the Lines – alto saxophone
- Lonnie Liston Smith And The Cosmic Echoes – Reflections of a Golden Dream – baritone saxophone
- Janis Ian – Aftertones – baritone saxophone
- Janis Ian – Janis Ian – Flute
- Van McCoy – Rhythms of the World – trumpet
- Barry Manilow – Even Now – Musicians contractor in New York
- Barry Manilow – Barry Manilow II
- Van Morrison – T.B. Sheets – flute, saxophone
- NYCC – Make Every Day Count – contractor for horns and strings
- Dusty Springfield – Longing – music contractor
