= Between the Lines (Janis Ian album) =

Studio album by Janis Ian
- Released: March 1975
- Recorded: 1974
- Studio: 914 Sound Studios; Blauvelt, New York
- Genre: Folk
- Length: 43:21
- Label: Columbia Records
- Producer: Brooks Arthur

Janis Ian chronology
Stars (1974)	Between the Lines (1975)	Aftertones (1976)

Between the Lines is the seventh studio album by American singer-songwriter Janis Ian, released in 1975 by Columbia Records. The album was recorded and mixed at 914 Sound Studios in Blauvelt, New York, with production by Brooks Arthur. The album reached number one on the Billboard album chart in September 1975, and has sold 1.9 million copies in the United States.

The song "At Seventeen" was released as a single and reached number three on the Billboard Hot 100 and topped the Adult Contemporary chart. Ian won the 1975 Grammy Award for Best Female Pop Vocal Performance for the song, and performed it on the first episode of Saturday Night Live on October 11, 1975. In 2000 it was voted number 590 in Colin Larkin's All Time Top 1000 Albums.

Professional ratings
Review scores
Source	Rating
AllMusic	link
Christgau's Record Guide	B−
Wilson and Allroy	3.5/5 stars
Rolling Stone Album Guide (1992)	3.5/5 stars

== Track listing ==
All tracks are written by Janis Ian.

No.	Title	Length
1.	"When the Party's Over"	2:57
2.	"At Seventeen"	4:41
3.	"From Me to You"	3:19
4.	"Bright Lights and Promises"	4:17
5.	"In the Winter"	2:29
6.	"Watercolors"	4:58
7.	"Between the Lines"	4:03
8.	"The Come On"	3:56
9.	"Light a Light"	2:45
10.	"Tea and Sympathy"	4:28
11.	"Lover's Lullaby"	5:25

== Personnel ==
- Produced by Brooks Arthur
- Engineered by Brooks Arthur, Larry Alexander, Russ Payne
- Art Direction and Design: John Berg, Paul Perlow
- Photography: Peter Cunningham
- Production Coordinator: Herb Gart

Musicians

- Al Gorgoni, Janis Ian, Sal DiTroia, Dave Snider, Dickie Frank – guitar
- Don Payne, Richard Davis, George Duvivier – bass guitar
- Barry Lazarowitz – drums, percussion
- Larry Alexander – percussion
- Kenny Kosek, Russell George – fiddle
- Claire Bay, Janis Ian and Dennis Pereca – background vocals

Orchestra

  - Arianna Bronne, Lewis Cley, Peter Dimitriades, Marie Hence, Max Hollander, Kathryn Kienke, Ezra Kliger, Harold Kohon, Harry Lookofsky, Joe Malin, David Sackson, Julius Schachter, Ora Shiran, Harry Urbont, Masako Yanagita – violin
  - Seymour Berman, George Brown, Eugenie Dengel, Patty Kopec, Richard Maximoff, David Sackson, Emanuel Vardi – viola
  - Seymour Barab, Gloria Lanzarone, Beverly Lauridsen, Jesse Levy, Charles McCracken, George Ricci – cello
  - Ray Crisara, Burt Collins, Jimmy Sedlar, Joe Shepley – trumpet
  - Eddie Bert, Mickey Gravine, Alan Raph, Bill Watrous – trombone
  - Jim Buffington – French horn
  - Romeo Penque, Phil Bodner – flute
  - Burt Collins – flugelhorn
  - Seldon Powell – tenor saxophone
- Ron Frangipane – string and horn arrangements
  - Artie Kaplan – orchestral contractor
- Recorded and Mixed at 914 Sound Studios in Blauvelt, New York, USA

== Charts ==
=== Weekly charts ===
Chart (1975)	Peak position
Australian (Kent Music Report)	16
Canada (RPM (magazine)	4
US Billboard 200	1

=== Year-end charts ===
Chart (1975)	Position
US Billboard 200	12
Canada RPM	41
Chart (1976)	Position
US Billboard 200	83

=== Certifications and sales ===
Region	Certification	Certified units/sales
Canada (Music Canada)	Gold	50,000^{^}
United States (RIAA)	Platinum	1,000,000^{^}
^{^} Shipments figures based on certification alone.
