= Aftertones =

Studio album by Janis Ian
- Released: 1976
- Recorded: late 1975
- Studio: Record Plant, New York City
- Genre: Adult contemporary
- Length: 33:11
- Label: Columbia
- Producer: Brooks Arthur

Janis Ian chronology
Between the Lines (1975)	Aftertones (1976)	Miracle Row (1977)

Professional ratings
Review scores
Source	Rating
AllMusic	3/5 stars
Christgau's Record Guide	B−
Wilson and Allroy	4.0/5 stars
Rolling Stone Album Guide (1992)	3.0/5 stars

Aftertones is the eighth album by American singer/songwriter Janis Ian, recorded 1975 in various New York studios and released 1976 by Columbia Records. "Love Is Blind" was a #1 single in Japan for six months. It was the highest-selling album by a solo female artist in Japan and was also a top twenty and gold record in the United States, Ireland and Holland. "I Would Like to Dance" reached #86 in Canada.

== Track listing ==
All tracks are written by Janis Ian.

Side One
No.	Title	Length
1.	"Aftertones"	3:13
2.	"I Would Like to Dance"	3:41
3.	"Love is Blind"	2:16
4.	"Roses"	3:11
5.	"Belle of the Blues"	4:31
Total length:		16:52

Side Two
No.	Title	Length
1.	"Goodbye to Morning"	3:08
2.	"Boy I Really Tied One On"	2:43
3.	"This Must be Wrong"	2:42
4.	"Don’t Cry, Old Man"	3:58
5.	"Hymn"	4:09
Total length:		16:40

== Charts ==
Chart (1976)	Peak position
US Billboard 200	12
Australian (Kent Music Report)	45
Canada (RPM (magazine)	81

== Personnel ==
- Janis Ian – vocals, guitar, piano
- Jeff Layton, Al Gorgoni, Bucky Pizzarelli – guitar
- Stu Woods, Richard Davis – bass guitar
- Barry Lazarowitz – percussion
- Arthur Jenkins – congas
- Claire Bay, Brooks Arthur, Odetta, V. Martin Fink – vocals
- Phoebe Snow – obligato vocals on "Hymn"
- Larry Spencer, Pete Nater, Tom Malone, Ernie Royal, Joe Shepley – trumpet
- Mickey Gravine, Lewis Kahn, Wayne Andre – trombone
- Donald Corrado, Earl Chapin, Jim Buffington – French horn
- Charles McCracken, Jesse Levy, Bruce Rogers, Kermit Moore, Max Hollander – cello
- Ezra Kliger, Gene Orloff, Julius Schacter, Kathryn Kienke, Harry Cykman, Harry Lookofsky, Michael Comins, Paul Winter – violin
- Emanuel Vardi, Eugenie Dengel, George Brown, David Sackson, Jennifer Ward Clarke – viola
- Gonzalo Fernandez – wooden flute on "I Would Like to Dance"
- George Young – tenor saxophone on "Belle of the Blues"
- Artie Kaplan – baritone saxophone on "Belle of the Blues"; bass clarinet on "Don't Cry, Old Man"
- Phil Bodner – oboe, alto flute, English horn on "Goodbye to Morning"
- Romeo Penque – oboe, alto flute, piccolo flue, English horn on "Goodbye to Morning"; contrabass clarinet on "Don't Cry, Old Man"
- Mike Gibson – arranger, conductor on "I Would Like to Dance"
- Jerry Ragovoy – arranger, conductor on "Belle of the Blues"
- Ron Frangipane – arranger, conductor on "Don't Cry, Old Man"

== Production ==
- Produced by Brooks Arthur
- Album photography: Peter Cunningham
- Album design: David L’Heureux
