= Janis Ian (1967 album) =

Studio album by Janis Ian
- Released: January 1967
- Recorded: 1965–1966
- Genre: Pop rock, folk rock
- Length: 37:45
- Label: Verve
- Producer: George "Shadow" Morton

Janis Ian chronology
Janis Ian (1967)	For All the Seasons of Your Mind (1967)

Professional ratings
Review scores
Source	Rating
AllMusic	4.0/5 stars
Wilson and Allroy	2.5/5 stars
Loraine Alterman (Detroit Free Press)	Favourable
Ferne Dovalina (Fort Worth Star-Telegram)	Favourable
Rolling Stone Album Guide (1992)	2.0/5 stars

Janis Ian is the debut album by American singer-songwriter Janis Ian, released in January 1967.

== Background ==
Janis Eddy Fink had begun writing poetry when she was eight and singing when she was twelve. Changing her name to "Janis Ian" after the middle name of her brother, she began to perform in New York folk clubs in her teens and made her first recording, "Baby I've Been Thinking" in September 1965. The song's topic of interracial romance was highly controversial and many record labels rejected Ian's recording.

Ian signed with Verve Records in 1966 and released the single – retitled as "Society's Child" – in September 1966. It slowly caught on and peaked at number 14 in the United States in July 1967. Her self-titled debut album was released at the beginning of 1967, peaking at number 29 at the beginning of September that year. Contemporary reviewers, notably Loraine Alterman of the Detroit Free Press, generally praised Ian's lyrical talent but some such as Peter Johnson of the Los Angeles Times said that the record's lyrical strengths were countered by Ian's fundamental musical weaknesses such as a thin voice.

During her period of prominence in the middle 1970s Janis Ian would distance herself from her Verve albums, calling them “a tax write-off for Verve”. She would drop even “Society’s Child” from her setlists whilst signed to Columbia Records, and although “Society’s Child” has returned since her 1990s comeback, nothing else from the debut is known to have been performed since 1972.

The album was re-released on compact disc on Now Sounds crnow 11 in 2009.

== Track listing ==
All tracks are written by Janis Ian.

Side one
No.	Title	Length
1.	"Society’s Child (Baby, I’ve Been Thinking)"	3:13
2.	"Too Old to Go 'Way Little Girl"	3:12
3.	"Hair of Spun Gold"	4:02
4.	"Then Tangles of My Mind"	2:37
5.	"I'll Give You a Stone If You'll Throw It (Changing Tymes)"	3:28
6.	"Pro-Girl"	2:47
Total length:		19:19

Side two
No.	Title	Length
1.	"Younger Generation Blues"	3:13
2.	"New Christ Cardiac Hero"	4:35
3.	"Lover Be Kindly"	2:58
4.	"Mrs. McKenzie"	2:43
5.	"Janey's Blues"	4:53
Total length:		18:26

== Personnel ==
- Janis Ian - guitar, organ, harpsichord, siren, tambourine, vocals, arrangements
- Al Gorgoni, Sal DiTroia, Vinnie Bell - guitar
- Joe Mack - bass
- Artie Butler - harpsichord, piano, organ
- Buddy Saltzman - drums
- Artie Kaplan - flute, arrangements

Technical

- Jerry Schoenbaum - production supervisor
- Val Valentin - director of engineering
- Joseph Solman - cover artwork
