= Miracle Row =

Studio album by Janis Ian
- Released: January 1977
- Recorded: November–December 1976
- Studio: Hit Factory, New York City
- Genre: Pop rock, singer-songwriter
- Length: 40:55
- Label: Columbia
- Producer: Ron Fragipane, Janis Ian

Janis Ian chronology
Aftertones (1976)	Miracle Row (1977)	Remember... (1978)

Miracle Row is the ninth studio album by Janis Ian, and her fourth for Columbia Records, released in 1977.

In contrast to her previous three albums, Miracle Row was recorded in New York City with her recent touring band and lacked the orchestration. Following her previous album Aftertones, Ian would spend much time in Spanish Harlem with her mother, and aimed to capture that vibe on her new album.

== Reception ==
Professional ratings
Review scores
Source	Rating
AllMusic	4.0/5 stars
The Rolling Stone Album Guide	2.5/5 stars

The Kingsport News gave the album "A" upon release, saying that Janis was "the best realist woman poet around today" and also one of its best vocalists. The Irving Daily News’ Jason Christopher also praised the album, saying that Janis Ian "scored another triumph" and that the album was "highly recommended for rainy-day listening". Joe McNally writing for the San Antonio Express, said that Janis "did what she did very well" and the critic admitted that he was a sucker for what she did.

Miracle Row, despite these positive reviews, was substantially ignored by most critics, many of whom, for example Robert Christgau, did not review the album at all. Miracle Row proved a major commercial flop, failing to crack the top 40 of the Billboard pop albums chart, whilst none of its three singles would chart anywhere except for "Will You Dance?" being a top 40 hit in Japan. It proved to be Ian's last album to dent the top 100 in the United States, for her efforts to adopt a highly commercial pop sound on her subsequent Columbia albums would gain success only in Europe and Australia, and not do so consistently even there.

== Track listing ==
All tracks are written by Janis Ian

Side 1
No.	Title	Length
1.	"Party Lights"	3:24
2.	"I Want to Make You Love Me"	3:21
3.	"Sunset of Your Life"	3:29
4.	"Take to the Sky"	4:34
5.	"Candlelight"	4:04
Total length:		19:52

Side 2
No.	Title	Length
1.	"Let Me Be Lonely"	3:58
2.	"Slow Dance Romance"	3:09
3.	"Will You Dance?"	3:05
4.	"I’ll Cry Tonight"	3:25
5.	"Miracle Row/Maria"	7:26
Total length:		21:03

== Personnel ==
- Janis Ian – vocals, guitar, keyboards
- Rubens Bassini – conductor, congas, percussion
- Claire Bay – vocals
- Phil Kraus – bass, cymbals, percussion
- Jeff Layton – guitar, guitar arrangements, horn
- Barry Lazarowitz – drums, percussion
- Stu Woods – bass

== Charts ==
Chart (1977)	Peak position
US Billboard 200	45
Australian (Kent Music Report)	58
Japan (Oricon Albums Chart)	26
Netherlands (Dutch Charts)	20
