= Breaking Silence =

Studio album by Janis Ian
- Released: 1992
- Studio: Nightingale Recording Studio, Nashville, Tennessee
- Genre: Pop rock
- Length: 48:42
- Label: Morgan Creek Records/Columbia
- Producer: Janis Ian, Jeff Balding

Janis Ian chronology
Uncle Wonderful (1985)	Breaking Silence (1992)	Simon Renshaw Presents: Janis Ian Shares Your Pain (1995)

Professional ratings
Review scores
Source	Rating
AllMusic	4.5/5 stars

Breaking Silence is an album by singer-songwriter Janis Ian, released in 1992 on Morgan Creek Records in the United States and Europe and on Columbia in Canada and the Netherlands.

== History ==
Although Ian was outed as a lesbian in 1976 by the Village Voice, her sexuality was largely ignored until the release of Breaking Silence when Ian herself brought it to the forefront because of her concern with suicide rates among gay and lesbian teenagers.

In the preceding decade, Ian met Pat Snyder and, after significant financial and health setbacks, they purchased a house together by 1991. They took on a second mortgage to fund the album, as major record labels were no longer interested in Ian's work. "I thought I was only going to get one more chance to record, so I wanted to make it count", Ian said. It was her first album in seven years.

The album contains political songs such as "His Hands" (about spousal abuse) and "Tattoo" (about the Holocaust). The title track, "Breaking Silence", is about incest. It also includes Ian's version of "Some People's Lives", previously recorded as the title track of Bette Midler's 1990 album. The album was nominated for a Grammy, making it Ian's seventh nomination.

== Track listing ==
All tracks are written by Janis Ian, unless otherwise noted.

No.	Title	Writer(s)	Length
1.	"All Roads to the River"	Janis Ian, Jon Vezner	3:05
2.	"Ride Me Like a Wave"		3:40
3.	"Tattoo"		4:20
4.	"Guess You Had To Be There"	Janis Ian, Buddy Mondlock	4:07
5.	"What About The Love"	Janis Ian, Kye Fleming	4:58
6.	"His Hands"		5:17
7.	"Walking On Sacred Ground"	Janis Ian, Jess Leary	3:26
8.	"This Train Still Runs"	Janis Ian, Jess Leary	4:03
9.	"Through The Years"		3:40
10.	"This House"		5:05
11.	"Some People's Lives"	Janis Ian, Kye Fleming	3:52
12.	"Breaking Silence"		3:09
Total length:			48:42

== Personnel ==
- Janis Ian – acoustic and electric guitar, piano, vocals
- Jim Brock – drums, percussion
- Jim Hoke – harmonica
- Chad Watson – bass
- Dann Huff – electric guitar

=== Production ===
- Jeff Balding – producer, lead engineer, mix engineer
- Doug Sax – mastering
- Lisa Powers – photography
- Jerry Joyner – design
- Virginia Team – art direction

==== Assistants ====
- Steve Bishir – assistant engineer
- Patrick Kelly – assistant engineer, overdubs
- Greg Parker – assistant engineer
- John David Parker – assistant engineer
- Christopher Rich – assistant engineer
- Toby Seay – assistant engineer
- Carry Summers – assistant engineer, overdubs
