= Janis Ian =

American singer-songwriter (born 1951)

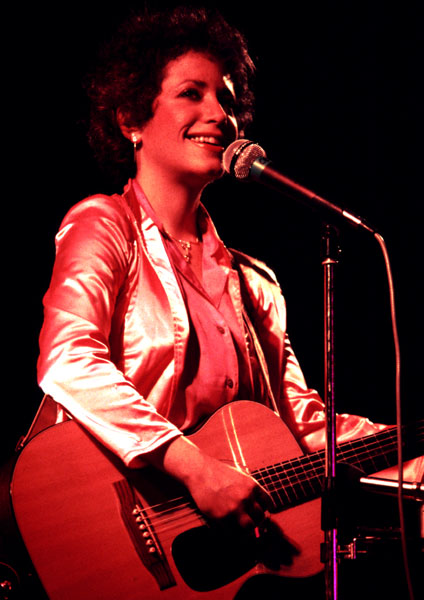
- Ian performing in concert in Dublin, Ireland, 1981

Background information
- Born: Janis Eddy Fink; April 7, 1951 (age 75); Farmingdale, New Jersey, U.S.
- Genres: Folk; soft rock
- Occupation: Singer-songwriter
- Years active: 1965–present
- Labels: Rude Girl; Columbia; Verve; Windham Hill
- Spouse(s): Tino Sargo (m. 1978; div. 1983) Patricia Snyder (m. 2003)
- Website: janisian.com

Janis Ian (born Janis Eddy Fink; April 7, 1951) is an American singer-songwriter who was most commercially successful in the 1960s and 1970s. Her signature songs are the 1966/67 hit "Society's Child (Baby I've Been Thinking)" and the 1975 Top Ten single "At Seventeen", from her seventh studio album Between the Lines, which in September 1975 reached No. 1 on the U.S. Billboard 200 chart.

Born in Farmingdale, New Jersey, Ian entered the American folk music scene while still a teenager in the mid-1960s. Most active musically in that decade and the 1970s, she has continued recording into the 21st century. She has won two Grammy Awards, the first in 1975 for "At Seventeen" and the second in 2013 for Best Spoken Word Album, for her autobiography, Society's Child, with ten nominations in eight categories.

Ian is a columnist and science fiction author.

== Early life ==
Born in Farmingdale, New Jersey, Ian was raised on a farm and attended East Orange High School in East Orange, New Jersey and the New York City High School of Music & Art in Manhattan. Both sets of grandparents (from Poland, Ukraine, and Tashkent, Uzbekistan) lived in the New York-New Jersey area, having emigrated via England around 1918. Her parents, Victor, a music teacher, and Pearl, a college fundraiser, were Jewish-born liberal atheists who ran several summer camps in upstate New York.

As a child, Ian admired the work of folk musicians including Joan Baez and Odetta. Starting with piano lessons at the age of two (at her own insistence), Ian, by the time she entered her teens, was playing the organ, harmonica, French horn, and guitar. At the age of 12, she wrote her first song, "Hair of Spun Gold", which was subsequently published in the folk publication Broadside and was later recorded for her eponymous debut album. In 1964, she legally changed her name to Janis Ian, taking her brother Eric's middle name as her new surname.

== Music career ==
At 14, Ian wrote and recorded her first hit single, "Society's Child (Baby I've Been Thinking)", about an interracial romance forbidden by a girl's mother and frowned upon by her peers and teachers. Produced by George "Shadow" Morton and released three times from 1965 to 1967, "Society's Child" became a national hit upon its third release after Leonard Bernstein featured it in a late-April 1967 CBS TV special titled Inside Pop: The Rock Revolution. In July 1967, "Society's Child" reached No. 14 on the Billboard Hot 100. The single sold 600,000 copies and the album sold 350,000 copies.

At 16, Ian met comedian Bill Cosby backstage at a Smothers Brothers show where she was promoting "Society's Child". Since she was underage, she was accompanied by a chaperone while touring. After her set, Ian had been sleeping with her head on the lap of her chaperone (an older female family friend). According to Ian in a 2015 interview, she was told by her then manager that Cosby had interpreted their interaction as "lesbian" and as a result "had made it his business" to warn other television shows that Ian wasn't "suitable family entertainment" and "shouldn't be on television" because of her sexuality, thus attempting to blacklist her. Although Ian would later come out, she states that at the time of the encounter with Cosby she had only been kissed once, by a boy she had a crush on, in broad daylight at summer camp.

On her website, Ian relates that although "Society's Child" was originally intended for Atlantic Records and the label paid for her recording session, Atlantic subsequently returned the master to her and quietly refused to release it. Ian relates that years later, Atlantic's president at the time, Jerry Wexler, publicly apologized to her for this. The single and Ian's 1967 debut album (which reached No. 29 on the chart) was finally released on Verve Forecast. In 2001, "Society's Child" was inducted into the Grammy Hall of Fame, which honors recordings considered timeless and important to music history. Her first four albums were released on a double CD entitled Society's Child: The Verve Recordings in 1995.

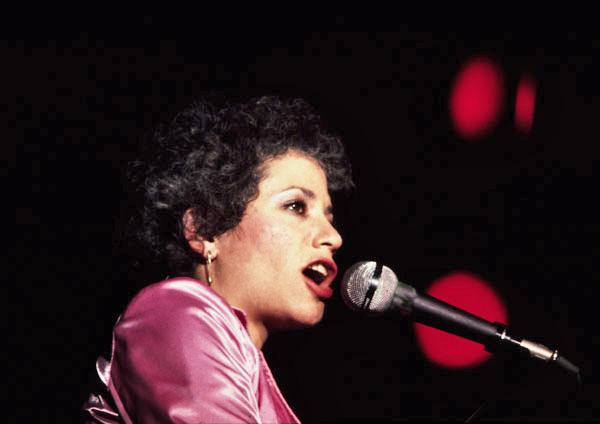
Ian performing at the National Stadium in Dublin, Ireland, May 1981

"Society's Child" stigmatized Ian as a one-hit wonder until her most successful US single, "At Seventeen", was released in 1975. "At Seventeen" is a bittersweet commentary on adolescent cruelty, the illusion of popularity and teenage angst, from the perspective of a narrator looking back on her earlier experience. The song was a major hit as it charted at number three on the Billboard Hot 100, hit number one on the Adult Contemporary chart and won the 1976 Grammy Award for Best Pop Vocal Performance - Female, beating Linda Ronstadt, Olivia Newton-John, Judy Collins and Helen Reddy. Ian appeared as the second musical guest on the series premiere of Saturday Night Live on October 11, 1975, performing "At Seventeen" and "In the Winter". The album Between the Lines was also a smash and reached number one on Billboard′s album chart. The album would be certified platinum for sales of over one million copies sold in the US. Another measure of her success is anecdotal: on Valentine's Day 1977, Ian received 461 valentine cards, having indicated in the lyrics to "At Seventeen" that she never received one as a teenager.

"Fly Too High" (1979), produced by disco producer Giorgio Moroder, was Ian's contribution to the soundtrack of the Jodie Foster film Foxes and was also featured on Ian's 1979 album Night Rains. It also became another international hit, reaching number one in many countries, including South Africa, Belgium, Australia, Israel and the Netherlands, and going gold or platinum in those countries and others. Another country where Ian has achieved a high level of popularity is Japan: Ian had two Top 10 singles on the Japanese Oricon charts, "Love Is Blind" in 1976 and "You Are Love" in 1980. Ian's 1976 album Aftertones also topped Oricon's album chart in October 1976. "You Are Love (Toujours Gai Mon Cher)" is the theme song of Kinji Fukasaku's 1980 movie Virus. Ian cut several other singles specifically for the Japanese market, including 1998's "The Last Great Place". In the US, Ian did not chart in the Top 40 on the pop charts after "At Seventeen", though she had several songs reach the Adult Contemporary singles chart through 1980 (all failing to make the Top 20).

Ian started Rude Girl Records, Inc., and its publishing arm, Rude Girl Publishing, on January 2, 1992. Since then, RGR has steadily grown, with its ownership of more than twenty-five Janis Ian albums and DVDs overseas, as well as hundreds of unreleased recordings and videos, including unreleased songs, concerts, demos, and rehearsal tapes. The Rude Girl label oversees the production of Ian's newer work, and in the case of older work, its re-mastering and the re-creation of the original artwork.

From 1982–92, Ian continued to write songs, often in collaboration with then songwriting partner Kye Fleming, some of which have been covered by Amy Grant, Bette Midler, Marti Jones and other artists. She released Breaking Silence in 1993 and came out as a lesbian. Other artists have recorded Ian's compositions, including Roberta Flack, who had a hit in 1973 with Ian's song "Jesse", which peaked at No. 30 on the Billboard Hot 100 on October 27, 1973. Ian's own version is included on her 1974 album Stars (the title song of which has also been oft-covered, including versions by Joan Baez, Shirley Bassey, Cher, Nina Simone and Barbara Cook). "At Seventeen" is Ian's most covered composition with 50 versions by artists including Celine Dion, Miki Howard and Julia Fordham. Ian's song "In The Winter" has also been covered many times by singers including Dusty Springfield and Sheena Easton. Richard Barone recorded Ian's song "Sweet Misery" on his album Sorrows & Promises: Greenwich Village in the 1960s in 2016. She continues to tour worldwide, though she stated that her 2022 North-American tour, which was cancelled when a laryngitis diagnosis became severe, would be her "last full tour". In August 2018 Ian performed at the UK's Cambridge Folk Festival.

== Criticism of the RIAA ==
Ian is an outspoken critic of the Recording Industry Association of America (RIAA), which she sees as acting against the interests of musicians and consumers. She has released several of her songs for free download from her website. "I've been surprised at how few people are willing to get annoyed with me over it," she laughs. "There was a little backlash here and there. I was scheduled to appear on a panel somewhere and somebody from a record company said if I was there they would boycott it. But that's been pretty much it. In general, the entire reaction has been favorable. I hear from a lot of people in my industry who don't want to be quoted, but say 'yeah, we're aware of this and we'd like to see a change too.'" Along with science fiction authors Eric Flint and Cory Doctorow, she has argued that their experience provides conclusive evidence that free downloads dramatically increased hard-copy sales, contrary to the claims of RIAA and NARAS.

== Writing and acting ==
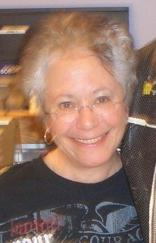
Ian at a Borders store book-signing, May 2005

Ian writes science fiction. A long-time reader of the genre, she became involved in science fiction fandom in 2001 by attending the Millennium Philcon in Philadelphia. Her short stories have been published in anthologies and with Mike Resnick, she co-edited Stars: Original Stories Based on the Songs of Janis Ian, an anthology published in 2003. She continues to occasionally go to science fiction conventions. Ian performed at the 2009 Nebula Award Conference in Los Angeles, where she sang "Welcome Home," a version of her song "At Seventeen" with the lyrics changed to talk about the acceptance she found by reading science fiction.

Ian was a regular columnist for the LGBT news magazine The Advocate and contributed to Performing Songwriter magazine from 1993 to 2006. On July 24, 2008, Ian released autobiography Society's Child (published by Penguin Tarcher), which was positively received. An accompanying double CD, The Autobiography Collection, has been released with many of Ian's best loved songs.

Ian took acting lessons and script interpretation classes from Stella Adler in the early 1980s to help her feel more comfortable on stage, and she and Adler remained close friends until Adler's death in 1992. In December 2015, Ian appeared in the series finale of HBO comedy series Getting On playing a patient who refused to stop singing.

== Personal life ==
Ian's mother, Pearl Yadoff Fink, was diagnosed with multiple sclerosis in 1975. Because of this, Ian and her brother persuaded their mother to pursue her lifelong dream of going to college. Fink eventually enrolled in Goddard College's adult education program and graduated with a master's degree. After Fink's death in 1997, Ian decided to auction off memorabilia to raise money to endow a scholarship at Goddard specifically for older continuing education students, which became the Pearl Foundation, a 501(c)(3) public charity. At the end of each year, 90% or more of funds raised from sale of merchandise, donations from fans and contributions from Ian herself are disbursed to various educational institutions to fund scholarships. By 2020, it had endowed more than $1,250,000 in scholarship funds at four schools.

Ian married Portuguese filmmaker Tino Sargo in 1978 and the two divorced in 1983. In her autobiography, Ian accused Sargo of physical and emotional abuse. After moving to Nashville, she met Patricia Snyder in 1989. Ian came out as a lesbian in 1993 with the worldwide release of her album Breaking Silence. Snyder and Ian married in Toronto on August 27, 2003. Ian has a stepdaughter and two grandchildren with Snyder.

== Discography ==
=== Studio albums ===
Year	Title	Chart positions						Label
Year	Title	US	AUS	CAN	JPN	NLD	UK	Label
1967	Janis Ian	29	—	—	—	—	—	Verve Forecast
1967	For All the Seasons of Your Mind	179	—	—	—	—	—	Verve Forecast
1968	The Secret Life of J. Eddy Fink	—	—	—	—	—	—	Verve Forecast
1969	Who Really Cares	—	—	—	—	—	—	Verve Forecast
1971	Present Company	—	—	—	—	—	—	Capitol
1974	Stars	63	82	—	—	—	—	Columbia
1975	Between the Lines	1	16	4	22	—	—	Columbia
1976	Aftertones	12	45	81	1	23	—	Columbia
1977	Miracle Row	45	58	—	26	20	—	Columbia
1978	Janis Ian	120	97	—	—	—	—	Columbia
1979	Night Rains	—	11	—	—	2	—	Columbia
1981	Restless Eyes	156	57	—	—	15	—	Columbia
1985	Uncle Wonderful	—	93	—	—	—	—	Interfusion
1992	Breaking Silence	—	—	—	—	—	—	Morgan Creek
1995	Revenge (Note: At this time, Ian made a parody version of Revenge under the name Simon Renshaw Presents: Janis Ian Shares Your Pain as a private joke and prank on her manager, Simon Renshaw. The album was later released publicly on iTunes; it's never been released on CD.)	—	—	—	—	—	81	Beacon
1997	Hunger	—	—	—	—	—	—	Windham Hill/Rude Girl
2000	God and the FBI	—	—	—	—	—	—	Windham Hill/Rude Girl
2001	Lost Cuts 1	—	—	—	—	—	—	Rude Girl
2004	Billie's Bones	—	—	—	—	—	—	Rude Girl
2006	Folk Is the New Black	—	—	—	—	—	—	Rude Girl
2014	Strictly Solo (Note: Available only at live shows.)	—	—	—	—	—	—	Rude Girl
2020	Hope	—	—	—	—	—	—	Rude Girl
2022	The Light at the End of the Line	—	—	—	—	—	—	Rude Girl

=== Live albums ===
Year	Title	Label
1978	Remember...	originally JVC Japan, now Rude Girl
1996	Live On the Test 1976	BBC World Wide
1999	The Bottom Line Encore Collection	The Bottom Line Record Company
2003	Live: Working Without a Net	Oh Boy/Rude Girl
2023	Live at The Calderone Theater 1975	Rude Girl

=== Compilation albums ===
Year	Title	Chart positions		Label
Year	Title	AUS	NLD	Label
1970	Golden Archive Series: Janis Ian	—	—	MGM Records
1977	Best of Janis Ian	69	—	Interfusion
1980	The Best of Janis Ian	—	—	CBS Benelux
1980	My Favourites	—	5	CBS Benelux
1990	At Seventeen	—	—	CBS
1992	Up 'Til Now - The Best of Janis Ian (Note: A limited-edition two-CD combining Up 'Til Now - The Best of Janis Ian with Breaking Silence was issued by Sony in 1993.)	—	18	Sony
1995	Society's Child: The Verve Recordings	—	—	Polydor/UMG
1998	Unreleased 1: Mary's Eyes	—	—	Rude Girl
2000	Unreleased 2: Take No Prisoners	—	—	Rude Girl
2001	Unreleased 3: Society's Child	—	—	Rude Girl
2002	The Best of Janis Ian	—	—	Festival (Australia)
2004	Souvenirs: Best of 1972–1981	—	—	Rude Girl
2007	Ultimate Best	—	—	JVC Victor
2008	Best of Janis Ian: Autobiography Collection	—	—	Rude Girl
2009	The Essential Janis Ian	—	—	Columbia/Legacy/Rude Girl
2011	Playlist: The Very Best of Janis Ian	—	—	Columbia/Legacy/Rude Girl
2017	The Essential Janis Ian 2.0	—	—	Sony (worldwide)
2023	Worktapes & Demos, Vol. 1	—	—	Rude Girl

=== Singles ===
Year	Titles (A-side, B-side) Both sides from same album except where indicated	Chart positions									Album
Year	Titles (A-side, B-side) Both sides from same album except where indicated	US Billboard	US Cash Box	US A/C	CAN	AUS	SA	UK	NLD	JPN	Album
1967	"Society's Child (Baby I've Been Thinking)" b/w "Letter to Jon" (Non-album track)	14	13	—	13	—	—	—	—	—	Janis Ian (Verve Forecast)
1967	"Younger Generation Blues" b/w "I'll Give You a Stone If You'll Throw It"	—	—	—	—	—	—	—	—	—	Janis Ian (Verve Forecast)
1967	"Insanity Comes Quietly to the Structured Mind" b/w "Sunflakes Fall, Snowrays Call"	109	82	—	76	—	—	—	—	—	For All The Seasons Of Your Mind
1968	"A Song for All the Seasons of Your Mind" b/w "Lonely One"	—	—	—	—	—	—	—	—	—	For All The Seasons Of Your Mind
1968	"Friends Again" b/w "Lady of the Night" (Non-album track)	—	—	—	—	—	—	—	—	—	The Secret Life of J. Eddy Fink
1968	"Janey's Blues" b/w "Everybody Knows" (from The Secret Life of J. Eddy Fink)	—	—	—	—	—	—	—	—	—	Janis Ian (Verve Forecast)
1969	"Calling Your Name" b/w "Month of May"	—	—	—	—	—	—	—	—	—	Who Really Cares
1971	"He's a Rainbow" b/w "Here in Spain" (US) or "See My Grammy Ride" (UK)	—	—	—	—	—	—	—	—	—	Present Company
1974	"The Man You Are in Me" b/w "Jesse"	104	105	33	—	—	—	—	—	—	Stars
1975	"When the Party's Over" b/w "Bright Lights and Promises"	—	112	20	—	—	—	—	—	—	Between the Lines
1975	"At Seventeen" b/w "Stars" (from Stars)	3	1	1	6	23	—	54 (Note: Chart position is from the official UK "Breakers List".)	—	—	Between the Lines
1975	"In the Winter" b/w "Thankyous" (from Stars)	—	97	21	—	—	—	—	—	—	Between the Lines
1976	"Boy I Really Tied One On" b/w "Aftertones"	—	—	43	—	50	—	—	—	—	Aftertones
1976	"I Would Like to Dance" b/w "Goodbye To Morning"	—	—	28	86	—	—	—	—	—	Aftertones
1976	"Roses" b/w "Love Is Blind"	—	—	37	—	—	—	—	—	—	Aftertones
1976	"Love Is Blind" b/w "Miracle Row" (from Miracle Row)	—	—	—	—	—	—	—	—	1	Aftertones
1976	"Between the Lines" b/w "Sweet Sympathy" (from Stars)	—	—	—	—	—	—	—	—	90	Between The Lines
1977	"Miracle Row" b/w "Take to the Sky"	—	—	—	—	—	—	—	—	—	Miracle Row
1977	"I Want to Make You Love Me" b/w "Candlelight"	—	—	—	—	—	—	—	—	—	Miracle Row
1977	"Will You Dance?" b/w "I Want to Make You Love Me"	—	—	—	—	—	—	—	—	40	Miracle Row
1978	"That Grand Illusion" b/w "Hopper Painting"	—	—	43	—	—	—	—	—	—	Janis Ian (Columbia)
1978	"The Bridge" b/w "Do You Wanna Dance"	—	—	—	—	—	—	—	—	—	Janis Ian (Columbia)
1979	"Here Comes the Night" b/w "Tonight Will Last Forever" (from Janis Ian (Columbia))	—	—	—	—	—	—	—	—	—	Night Rains
1979	"Fly Too High" b/w "Night Rains"	—	—	—	—	7	1	44	5	—	Night Rains
1980	"You Are Love" b/w "All to You"	—	—	—	—	—	—	—	—	10	"Virus" soundtrack (Japan release only)
1980	"The Other Side of the Sun" b/w "Memories"	—	—	47	—	44	—	44	30	—	Night Rains
1981	"Under the Covers" b/w "Sugar Mountain"	71	79	—	—	—	—	—	—	—	Restless Eyes
1981	"Restless Eyes" b/w "I Remember Yesterday"	—	—	—	—	—	—	—	—	—	Restless Eyes
1985	"Body Slave (Re-Mix)" b/w "Mechanical Telephone" (Australia)	—	—	—	—	—	—	—	—	—	Uncle Wonderful
1985	"Heart Skip Too Many Beats" b/w "Sniper of the Heart" (Australia/New Zealand)	—	—	—	—	—	—	—	—	—	Uncle Wonderful
1989	"Heaven Knows" b/w "Heaven Knows (Non Vocal Version)" (Japan)	—	—	—	—	—	—	—	—	—	Non-album track
1992	"Days Like These" (promo)	—	—	—	—	—	—	—	—	—	Falling from Grace (Soundtrack)
1992	"Walking On Sacred Ground" b/w "Cosmopolitan Girl (Live)" & "When He Was Here (Live)" (Europe)	—	—	—	—	—	—	—	—	—	Breaking Silence
1993	"Tattoo" b/w "Cosmopolitan Girl (Live)" & "When He Was Here (Live)" (Europe)	—	—	—	—	—	—	—	—	—	Breaking Silence
1993	"Guess You Had To Be There" b/w "Breaking Silence" (Europe)	—	—	—	—	—	—	—	—	—	Breaking Silence
1995	"Tenderness" b/w "Take No Prisoners" & "When Angels Cry" (Europe)	—	—	—	—	—	—	—	—	—	Revenge
1995	"Take Me Walking in the Rain" b/w "When the Silence Fall"	—	—	—	—	—	—	—	—	—	Revenge
1997	"Honor Them All" (promo)	—	—	—	—	—	—	—	—	—	Hunger
1998	"Getting Over You" (promo)	—	—	—	—	—	—	—	—	—	Hunger
2000	"Jolene"	—	—	—	—	—	—	—	—	—	God and the FBI
2006	"The Great Divide"	—	—	—	—	—	—	—	—	—	Folk Is the New Black
2006	"Standing In the Shadows of Love" b/w "All Those Promises" & "Crocodile Song"	—	—	—	—	—	—	—	—	—	Folk Is the New Black
2006	"Married In London"	—	—	—	—	—	—	—	—	—	Non-album track
2010	"Welcome Home (The Nebulas Song)"	—	—	—	—	—	—	—	—	—	Non-album track
2010	"Every Woman's Song" (with Angela Aki)	—	—	—	—	—	—	—	—	53	Non-album track
2012	"The Tiny Mouse"	—	—	—	—	—	—	—	—	—	The Tiny Mouse Book/CD
2013	"Architect of All Creation"	—	—	—	—	—	—	—	—	—	The Singer & the Song audiobook
2014	"I'm Still Standing"	—	—	—	—	—	—	—	—	—	Strictly Solo
2014	"Society's Child (Solo Acoustic)"	—	—	—	—	—	—	—	—	—	Strictly Solo
2014	"At Seventeen (Solo Acoustic)"	—	—	—	—	—	—	—	—	—	Strictly Solo
2015	"Getting On"	—	—	—	—	—	—	—	—	—	Getting On
2017	"1776"	—	—	—	—	—	—	—	—	—	Non-album track
2017	"Perfect Little Girl"	—	—	—	—	—	—	—	—	—	The Light at the End of the Line
2017	"Swannanoa"	—	—	—	—	—	—	—	—	—	The Light at the End of the Line
2019	"Resist"	—	—	—	—	—	—	—	—	—	The Light at the End of the Line
2020	"Amazing Grace"	—	—	—	—	—	—	—	—	—	Non-album track
2020	"Better Times Will Come" with Neil Finn	—	—	—	—	—	—	—	—	—	Non-album track
2021	"I Am the One"	—	—	—	—	—	—	—	—	—	Hope
2021	"A Thousand Years"	—	—	—	—	—	—	—	—	—	Hope
2021	"Today You're Mine (Unplugged 2007)"	—	—	—	—	—	—	—	—	—	Non-album track
2024	"When He Was Here"	—	—	—	—	—	—	—	—	—	Non-album track
2024	"Swannanoa" (re-release)	—	—	—	—	—	—	—	—	—	The Light at the End of the Line
2025	"One in a Million" (Live, with Joan Baez)	—	—	—	—	—	—	—	—	—	Non-album track

=== Video albums ===
Year	Title	Format	Label
1994	Live at the Forum (Japan)	Laserdisc	Midi Inc.
2004	Live at Club Cafe	DVD	Rude Girl
2004	Janismania	DVD	Rude Girl
2007	Through the Years: A Retrospective	DVD	Rude Girl
2007	'79: Live In Japan & Australia	DVD	Rude Girl
2008	Live From Grand Center	DVD	Rude Girl

=== Film ===
Year	Title	Role	Notes	Ref.
2025	Janis Ian: Breaking Silence	Herself	Documentary	

== Grammy Awards ==
Year	Category	Work	Result
1968	Best Folk Performance	Janis Ian	Nominated
1976	Record of the Year	"At Seventeen"	Nominated
1976	Song of the Year	"At Seventeen"	Nominated
1976	Best Pop Vocal Performance, Female	"At Seventeen"	Won
1976	Album of the Year	Between the Lines	Nominated
1982	Best Jazz Vocal Performance	"Silly Habits" with Mel Torme	Nominated
1994	Best Contemporary Folk Album	Breaking Silence	Nominated
2002	Grammy Hall of Fame	"Society's Child"	Honored
2013	Best Audio Book	"Society's Child: My Autobiography"	Won
2016	Best Audio Book	Patience and Sarah with Jean Smart	Nominated
2023	Best Folk Album	The Light at the End of the Line	Nominated

== Bibliography ==
- Who Really Cares: Poems From Childhood and Early Youth, 1969 (2002 re-release), ISBN 978-1-930709-37-9
- Songbook, 1999, ISBN 978-0-7692-0148-1
- Stars: Original Stories Based on the Songs of Janis Ian, 2003, ISBN 978-0-7564-0177-1 (ed., with Mike Resnick)
- "Prayerville", 2003, in Mike Resnick and Martin H. Greenberg (eds), Women Writing Science Fiction As Men, ISBN 978-0-7564-0148-1
- Society's Child: My Autobiography, 2008, Tarcher/Penguin; ISBN 1-58542-675-X; ISBN 978-1-58542-675-1
