= Society's Child =

Single by Janis Ian

from the album Janis Ian
- B-side: "Letter to Jon"
- Released: September 1966
- Recorded: August 3, 1965
- Genre: Baroque pop • protest song
- Length: 3:13
- Label: Verve; 5027
- Songwriter: Janis Ian
- Producer: Shadow Morton

Janis Ian singles chronology
"Society's Child" (1966)	"Younger Generation Blues" (1967)

"Society's Child" (originally titled "Baby I've Been Thinking") is a song about an interracial relationship written and recorded by American singer-songwriter Janis Ian in 1965. According to Janis Ian, Atlantic Records refused to release it although the company had financed the recording; the artist took it to Verve Records who agreed to release it.

== Background ==
The song's lyrics concern an interracial romance – a still-taboo subject in mid-1960s America. Ian was 13 years of age when she was motivated to write and compose the song, and she completed it when she was 14. Released as "Society's Child (Baby I've Been Thinking)", the single charted highly in many cities in the autumn of 1966 but did not hit it big time, nationally, until the summer of 1967.

The lyrics of the song center on the feelings of a young girl who witnesses the humiliation that her African American boyfriend receives from the girl's mother and the taunts that she herself endures not only from classmates but also from educators whose hypocrisy leads them to "laugh their smirking stares" while acting as "preachers of equality". It closes with her decision to end the relationship with the boyfriend because of her inability to deal with the social pressure. In her autobiography, Ian made this comment about the concluding line: "I didn’t want the breakup for their relationship to be just society’s fault. I wanted the girl to take some responsibility for it, too."

In 1964, Ian lived in East Orange, New Jersey. Her neighborhood was predominantly populated by African Americans and she was one of very few whites in her school.

I saw it from both ends. I was seeing it from the end of all the civil rights stuff on the television and radio, of white parents being incensed when their daughters would date black men, and I saw it around me when black parents were worried about their sons or daughters dating white girls or boys. I don't think I knew where I was going when I started it, but when I hit the second line, "face is clean and shining black as night", it was obvious where the song was going. I don't think I made a conscious decision to have the girl cop out in the end, it just seemed like that would be the logical thing at my age, because how can you buck school and society and your parents, and make yourself an outcast forever?

Songwriter and producer Shadow Morton signed Ian to a record contract and made the decision to issue "Society's Child" as her first release. Ian's original title for the song was "Baby, I've Been Thinking", but Morton changed it to "Society's Child". It was recorded using six studio musicians.

Leonard Bernstein's producer saw Ian perform "Society's Child" at The Gaslight and scheduled Ian to perform the song on Inside Pop: The Rock Revolution, an April 25, 1967 CBS television special about new pop music. After acknowledging the controversial nature of the subject, Bernstein praised the musical qualities of Janis Ian's "marvellous song":

"Society's Child" contains many of the musical joys we've talked about, and some we haven't – like fascinating sounds, both natural and electronic, like a strange use of harpsichord, and that cool nasty electric organ. There are astonishing key changes, and even tempo changes; ambiguous cadences, unequal phrase lengths – the works! (...) So it would seem that the kids of our pop generation have a lot to say.

Later Janis Ian acknowledged the "incredible impact" that the program had on her career. Largely owing to Bernstein's efforts, Verve Records started promoting it in trade magazines and many radio stations picked it up. Some stations, such as Chicago's WLS, did not play the song, but rival station WCFL did, and there it peaked at #12 on 17 August and lasted twelve weeks on the playlist. Though several radio stations were slow to add the song to their playlists, this behavior extended the record's airplay life.

"Society's Child" was inducted into the Grammy Hall of Fame in 2002. The title of the song is also part of the title of Ian's autobiography published in July 2008.

== Chart performance ==
Recorded in 1965 and released in 1966, the single charted high in many cities in the autumn of 1966 but did not enter Billboard's Hot 100 until the spring of 1967 (the issue dated 27 May, shortly before the related 12 June Loving v. Virginia decision). The record reached number one or the Top Ten in several key cities across America, but in July it stalled at No. 14 on the Hot 100 owing to resistance in certain markets, as was the fate of several other controversial pop hits of the era. Eventually, the single sold 600,000 copies and the album sold 350,000 copies.

== Chart history ==
Chart (1967)	Peak position
Canada (RPM)	13
U.S. Billboard Hot 100	14
U.S. Cash Box Pop Singles Chart	13

== Cover versions ==
Artists who covered “Society’s Child” include:

- Spooky Tooth on their 1968 album It's All About
- Judy Stone & Third Eye in 1969
- Jeanette in 1973
- Camel
- Lou Gramm

On October 23, 2011, Ian performed the song with Ryan Adams and Neil Finn on BBC Four's Series 2 Episode 4 of the series, Songwriters' Circle. She stated that she conceived the song when she was 12, wrote it at 13, published it at 14, became known at 15, and was a has-been at 16. The song was released in the midst of the Civil Rights Movement of the 1960s in the United States. Ian went on to say that a radio station in the 1960s was burned to the ground for playing it and a writer at the Boston Herald was fired for writing about it.
