= John Michael Montgomery discography =

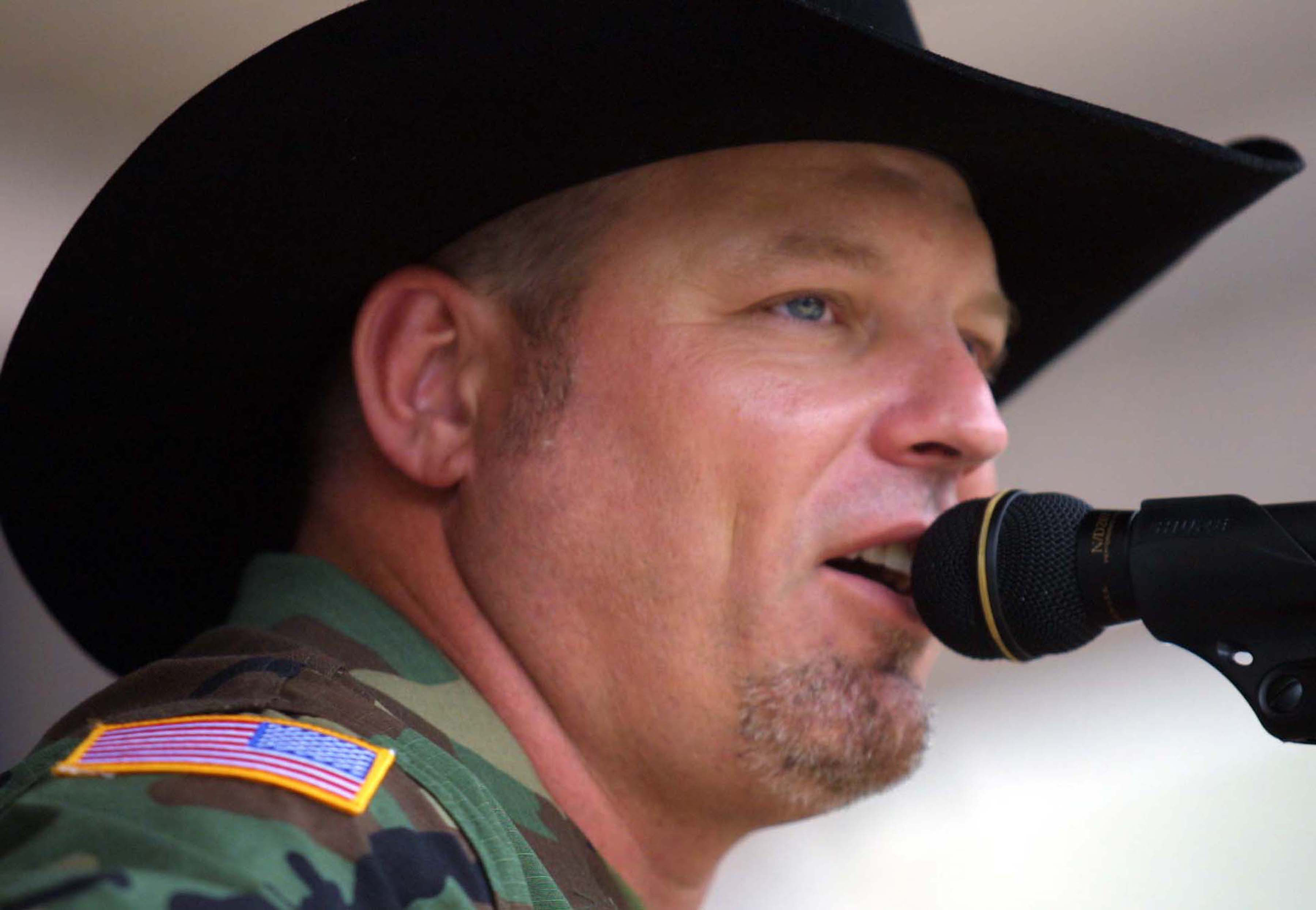
- Studio albums: 11
- Compilation albums: 3
- Singles: 36
- Music videos: 22
- No. 1 singles: 7

John Michael Montgomery is an American country music artist. His discography comprises 11 studio albums, three compilation albums and 36 singles. Of his albums, six studio albums and his 1997 Greatest Hits album are all certified gold or higher by the RIAA, with the highest-certified being 1994's Kickin' It Up and his 1995 self-titled album, both at 4×Multi-Platinum certification for shipping four million copies. The former is also his highest-certified in Canada at 2× Platinum by the CRIA. Montgomery's first seven albums were all issued via Atlantic Records Nashville, with Pictures in 2002 being his first release for Warner Bros. Records after Atlantic closed its Nashville branch. His Christmas album Mr. Snowman and 2004's Letters from Home were also issued by Warner Bros., and his most recent album (2008's Time Flies) was released via Stringtown Records, his own label.

Of Montgomery's thirty-six singles, seven have reached Number One on the Billboard country singles charts: "I Love the Way You Love Me" (1993), "I Swear" (1994), "Be My Baby Tonight" (1994), "If You've Got Love" (1994), "I Can Love You Like That" (1995), "Sold (The Grundy County Auction Incident) (1995), and "The Little Girl" (2000). "I Swear" and "Sold" were also the Number One country singles of 1994 and 1995, respectively, according to the Billboard Year-End charts. Besides his seven Number Ones, Montgomery has had thirteen more Top Ten country hits in the US. One of these, "Friends" (1997), was also a Number One on the RPM country charts in Canada, as were all of his US Number Ones except "If You've Got Love" and "I Can Love You Like That". Several of Montgomery's singles also crossed over to the Billboard Hot 100, including three which reached Top 40 on that chart: 1998's "Hold On to Me" (#4 country, #33 pop), 2000's "The Little Girl" (#35 pop), and 2004's "Letters from Home" (#2 country, #24 pop).

== Studio albums ==
=== 1992–2000 ===
Title	Album details	Peak chart positions				Certifications (sales thresholds)
Title	Album details	US Country	US	CAN Country	CAN	Certifications (sales thresholds)
Life's a Dance	Release date: October 13, 1992; Label: Atlantic Records; Formats: CD, cassette	4	27	6	—	US: 3× Platinum; CAN: Gold
Kickin' It Up	Release date: January 25, 1994; Label: Atlantic Records; Formats: CD, cassette	1	1	1	23	US: 4× Platinum; CAN: 2× Platinum
John Michael Montgomery	Release date: March 28, 1995; Label: Atlantic Records; Formats: CD, cassette	1	5	1	33	US: 4× Platinum; CAN: Platinum
What I Do the Best	Release date: September 24, 1996; Label: Atlantic Records; Formats: CD, cassette	5	39	14	—	US: Platinum
Leave a Mark	Release date: May 5, 1998; Label: Atlantic Records; Formats: CD, cassette	15	95	26	—	US: Gold
Home to You	Release date: May 25, 1999; Label: Atlantic Records; Formats: CD, cassette	16	135	11	—	
Brand New Me	Release date: September 19, 2000; Label: Atlantic Records; Formats: CD, cassette	2	15	4	—	US: Gold
"—" denotes releases that did not chart

=== 2002–2008 ===
Title	Album details	Peak chart positions		
Title	Album details	US Country	US	US Indie
Pictures	Release date: October 8, 2002; Label: Warner Bros. Nashville; Formats: CD	13	110	—
Mr. Snowman	Release date: October 7, 2003; Label: Warner Bros. Nashville; Formats: CD	—	—	—
Letters from Home	Release date: April 20, 2004; Label: Warner Bros. Nashville; Formats: CD, music download	3	31	—
Time Flies	Release date: October 14, 2008; Label: Stringtown Records; Formats: CD, music download	35	172	27
"—" denotes releases that did not chart

== Compilation albums ==
Title	Album details	Peak chart positions		Certifications (sales thresholds)
Title	Album details	US Country	US	Certifications (sales thresholds)
Greatest Hits (Note: Greatest Hits also peaked at number 11 on the RPM Country Albums chart.)	Release date: October 14, 1997; Label: Atlantic Records; Formats: CD, cassette	5	33	US: Platinum
Love Songs	Release date: February 5, 2002; Label: Warner Bros. Nashville; Formats: CD	27	—	
The Very Best of John Michael Montgomery	Release date: August 26, 2003; Label: Warner Bros. Nashville; Formats: CD	11	77	
"—" denotes releases that did not chart

== Singles ==
=== 1992–2000 ===
Year	Single	Peak chart positions			Certifications (sales threshold)	Album
Year	Single	US Country	US	CAN Country	Certifications (sales threshold)	Album
1992	"Life's a Dance"	4	—	3		Life's a Dance
1993	"I Love the Way You Love Me"	1	60	1		Life's a Dance
1993	"Beer and Bones"	21	— (Note: "Beer and Bones" did not enter the Hot 100, but peaked at number 23 on Bubbling Under Hot 100 Singles, which acts as a 25-song extension of the Hot 100.)	13		Life's a Dance
1993	"I Swear"	1	42	1	US: Gold	Kickin' It Up
1994	"Rope the Moon"	4	— (Note: "Rope the Moon" did not enter the Hot 100, but peaked at number 15 on Bubbling Under Hot 100 Singles, which acts as a 25-song extension of the Hot 100.)	2		Kickin' It Up
1994	"Be My Baby Tonight"	1	73	1		Kickin' It Up
1994	"If You've Got Love"	1	—	2		Kickin' It Up
1995	"I Can Love You Like That"	1	—	3		John Michael Montgomery
1995	"Sold (The Grundy County Auction Incident)"	1	—	1		John Michael Montgomery
1995	"No Man's Land"	3	— (Note: "No Man's Land" did not enter the Hot 100, but peaked at number 12 on Bubbling Under Hot 100 Singles, which acts as a 25-song extension of the Hot 100.)	2		John Michael Montgomery
1995	"Cowboy Love"	4	—	4		John Michael Montgomery
1996	"Long as I Live"	4	—	4		John Michael Montgomery
1996	"Ain't Got Nothin' on Us"	15	— (Note: "Ain't Got Nothin' on Us" did not enter the Hot 100, but peaked at number 15 on Bubbling Under Hot 100 Singles, which acts as a 25-song extension of the Hot 100.)	3		What I Do the Best
1996	"Friends"	2	69	1		What I Do the Best
1997	"I Miss You a Little"	6	— (Note: "I Miss You a Little" did not enter the Hot 100, but peaked at number 9 on Bubbling Under Hot 100 Singles, which acts as a 25-song extension of the Hot 100.)	5		What I Do the Best
1997	"How Was I to Know"	2	—	8		What I Do the Best
1997	"Angel in My Eyes"	4	—	6		Greatest Hits
1998	"Love Working on You"	14	— (Note: "Love Working on You" did not enter the Hot 100, but peaked at number 25 on Bubbling Under Hot 100 Singles, which acts as a 25-song extension of the Hot 100.)	8		Leave a Mark
1998	"Cover You in Kisses"	3	91	2		Leave a Mark
1998	"Hold On to Me"	4	33	4		Leave a Mark
1999	"Hello L.O.V.E."	15	71	11		Home to You
1999	"Home to You"	2	45	8		Home to You
2000	"Nothing Catches Jesus by Surprise"	50	—	80		Home to You
2000	"You Are"	48	—	69		Home to You
2000	"The Little Girl"	1	35	1		Brand New Me
"—" denotes releases that did not chart

=== 2001–2008 ===
Year	Single	Peak chart positions		Album
Year	Single	US Country	US	Album
2001	"That's What I Like About You"	44	—	Brand New Me
2001	"Even Then"	59	—	Brand New Me
2002	"'Til Nothing Comes Between Us"	19	— (Note: "'Til Nothing Comes Between Us" did not enter the Hot 100, but peaked at number 13 on Bubbling Under Hot 100 Singles, which acts as a 25-song extension of the Hot 100.)	Pictures
2003	"Country Thang"	45	—	Pictures
2003	"Four-Wheel Drive"	52	—	Pictures
2003	"Cool"	—	—	The Very Best of John Michael Montgomery
2004	"Letters from Home"	2	24	Letters from Home
2004	"Goes Good with Beer"	51	—	Letters from Home
2008	"Mad Cowboy Disease"	—	—	Time Flies
2008	"If You Ever Went Away"	—	—	Time Flies
2008	"Forever"	28	—	Time Flies
"—" denotes releases that did not chart

== Other singles ==
=== Guest singles ===
Year	Single	Artist	Peak positions	Album
Year	Single	Artist	US Country	Album
1994	"Amazing Grace"	The Maverick Choir	—	Maverick (soundtrack)
1997	"Warning Signs"	Bill Engvall	56	—N/a
2009	"Ride Through the Country"	Colt Ford	57	Ride Through the Country

=== Other charted songs ===
Year	Single	Peak positions	Album
Year	Single	US Country	Album
1994	"Kick It Up"	72	Kickin' It Up

== Music videos ==
Year	Video	Director
1992	"Life's a Dance"	Marc Ball
1993	"I Love the Way You Love Me"	Marc Ball
1993	"Beer and Bones"	Marc Ball
1993	"I Swear"	Marc Ball
1994	"Amazing Grace" (The Maverick Choir)	Gil Bettman
1994	"Rope the Moon"	Marc Ball
1994	"Be My Baby Tonight"	Marc Ball
1995	"I Can Love You Like That"	Marc Ball
1995	"Sold (The Grundy County Auction Incident)"	Martin Kahan
1995	"No Man's Land"	Marc Ball
1995	"Cowboy Love"	Marc Ball
1996	"Ain't Got Nothin' on Us"	Martin Kahan
1997	"I Miss You a Little"	Lou Chanatry
1997	"How Was I to Know"	Lou Chanatry
1997	"Warning Signs" (with Bill Engvall)	Peter Zavadil
1998	"Angel in My Eyes"	Jim Shea
1998	"Love Working on You"	Jim Shea
1999	"Hold on to Me"	Jim Shea
1999	"Hello L.O.V.E."	Jim Shea
1999	"Home to You"	Jim Shea
2000	"The Little Girl"	Roger Pistole
2004	"Letters from Home"	Darrin Dickerson
2008	"If You Ever Went Away"	Jason Epperson
