= 1997 in country music =

This is a list of notable events in country music that took place in the year 1997.

== Events ==
- April 22 - George Strait releases his 17th studio album, Carrying Your Love with Me. The album went on to be nominated for Best Male Country Vocal Performance at the 1998 Grammy Awards.
- June 27- Pee Wee King celebrates his 60th Grand Ole Opry Anniversary
- July 12 — The song, "It's Your Love," by Tim McGraw and Faith Hill becomes the first song in 20 years to spend six weeks atop Billboard magazine Hot Country Singles & Tracks chart. The last song to do so was 1977's "Luckenbach, Texas (Back to the Basics of Love)" by Waylon Jennings. In that span, more than 750 songs had reached No. 1 on the country chart, a majority of them for just one week. The song sparked a renewed wave of songs that spend at least five weeks at No. 1, thanks in part to newer chart tracking methods and programming changes at country radio stations.
- August 7 - Garth Brooks plays a free concert at New York's Central Park, drawing over 1 million fans, with many dubbing it "Garthstock"; the special is broadcast on HBO, with its audience drawing 14.6 million. Billy Joel and Don McLean make special guest appearances.
- November 4 - Shania Twain releases her third studio album, Come On Over. The album becomes the best-selling country album of all time, best-selling studio album by a female act, best-selling album by a Canadian and ninth best-selling album in the United States and worldwide.
- December 10 – Faith Hill and LeAnn Rimes at the Christmas Time with Eddy Arnold.

=== No dates ===
- Jimmie Rodgers is elected to the Rock and Roll Hall of Fame (as an early influence).
- Trisha Yearwood and LeAnn Rimes both record the song "How Do I Live" for the movie Con Air. Producers from the film ask Rimes to record it first but feel her version is not what they have in mind due to the performance itself and her young age. Yearwood then records the song and releases at the same time Rimes releases her song. Although Rimes' version peaked at No. 43 on the Billboard Hot Country Singles & Tracks chart, her version is shunned from the country charts yet reaches No. 2 on the Billboard Hot 100. Yearwood's version, meanwhile, peaks at No. 2 on the Billboard Hot Country Singles & Tracks chart and also makes the Top 40 of the Billboard Hot 100, as well as reaching No. 1 in Canada and No. 1 on the US Radio & Records chart.

== Top hits of the year ==
=== Singles released by American artists ===
US	CAN	Single	Artist	Reference
21	16	455 Rocket	Kathy Mattea	
4	4	All the Good Ones Are Gone	Pam Tillis	
2	2	Amen Kind of Love	Daryle Singletary	
3	14	Another You	David Kersh	
2	3	Better Man, Better Off	Tracy Lawrence	
3	5	Big Love	Tracy Byrd	
1	1	Carrying Your Love with Me	George Strait	
30	16	Cold Outside	Big House	
1	3	Come Cryin' to Me	Lonestar	
5	7	Count Me In	Deana Carter	
3	4	Dancin', Shaggin' on the Boulevard	Alabama	
21	12	Dark Horse	Mila Mason	
11	12	Day In, Day Out	David Kersh	
17	13	Don't Love Make a Diamond Shine	Tracy Byrd	
4	4	Don't Take Her She's All I Got	Tracy Byrd	
3	2	Drink, Swear, Steal & Lie	Michael Peterson	
20	22	Ease My Troubled Mind	Ricochet	
3	1	Everybody Knows	Trisha Yearwood	
9	6	Everything I Love	Alan Jackson	
1	2	Everywhere	Tim McGraw	
2	5	The Fool	Lee Ann Womack	
2	1	Friends	John Michael Montgomery	
1	11	From Here to Eternity	Michael Peterson	
4	4	A Girl's Gotta Do (What a Girl's Gotta Do)	Mindy McCready	
3	3	Go Away	Lorrie Morgan	
4	17	Good as I Was to You	Lorrie Morgan	
6	2	Half Way Up	Clint Black	
18	14	He Left a Lot to Be Desired	Ricochet	
18	22	Heartbroke Every Day	Lonestar	
18	21	Helping Me Get Over You	Travis Tritt featuring Lari White	
7	9	Her Man	Gary Allan	
4	5	Holdin'	Diamond Rio	
3	3	Honky Tonk Truth	Brooks & Dunn	
4	5	How a Cowgirl Says Goodbye	Tracy Lawrence	
1	2	How Do I Get There	Deana Carter	
2	1	How Do I Live	Trisha Yearwood	
1	1	How Was I to Know	Reba McEntire	
2	8	How Was I to Know	John Michael Montgomery	
1	1	How Your Love Makes Me Feel	Diamond Rio	
8	11	I Can't Do That Anymore	Faith Hill	
17	14	I Have to Surrender	Ty Herndon	
2	1	I Left Something Turned On at Home	Trace Adkins	
6	5	I Miss You a Little	John Michael Montgomery	
7	26	I Only Get This Way with You	Rick Trevino	
19	18	I Will, If You Will	John Berry	
2	2	I'd Rather Ride Around with You	Reba McEntire	
9	12	If She Don't Love You	The Buffalo Club	
4	7	If You Love Somebody	Kevin Sharp	
2	2	In Another's Eyes	Trisha Yearwood and Garth Brooks	
2	1	Is That a Tear	Tracy Lawrence	
1	5	It's a Little Too Late	Mark Chesnutt	
19	14	It's All the Same to Me	Billy Ray Cyrus	
1	1	It's Your Love	Tim McGraw (with Faith Hill)	
19	27	King of the Mountain	George Strait	
5	16	Land of the Living	Pam Tillis	
8	16	Let It Rain	Mark Chesnutt	
11	5	Let Me into Your Heart	Mary Chapin Carpenter	
5	13	The Light in Your Eyes	LeAnn Rimes	
2	6	A Little More Love	Vince Gill	
9	8	Little Things	Tanya Tucker	
1	1	Longneck Bottle	Garth Brooks	
4	3	Love Is the Right Place	Bryan White	
2	2	Loved Too Much	Ty Herndon	
1	4	A Man This Lonely	Brooks & Dunn	
18	11	Maybe He'll Notice Her Now	Mindy McCready featuring Lonestar's Richie McDonald	
4	1	Maybe We Should Just Sleep on It	Tim McGraw	
1	6	Me Too	Toby Keith	
1	1	Nobody Knows	Kevin Sharp	
2	2	On the Verge	Collin Raye	
1	1	One Night at a Time	George Strait	
18	12	One, Two, I Love You	Clay Walker	
5	7	Places I've Never Been	Mark Wills	
7	22	Please	The Kinleys	
2	3	Pretty Little Adriana	Vince Gill	
4	5	The Rest of Mine	Trace Adkins	
1	1	Rumor Has It	Clay Walker	
1	6	Running Out of Reasons to Run	Rick Trevino	
2	1	Sad Lookin' Moon	Alabama	
5	7	The Shake	Neal McCoy	
4	2	She Drew a Broken Heart	Patty Loveless	
21	19	She Wants to Be Wanted Again	Ty Herndon	
24	17	She's Going Home with Me	Travis Tritt	
1	1	She's Got It All	Kenny Chesney	
3	4	She's Sure Taking It Well	Kevin Sharp	
2	2	She's Taken a Shine	John Berry	
14	21	Shut Up and Drive	Chely Wright	
1	1	Sittin' on Go	Bryan White	
13	9	Six Days on the Road	Sawyer Brown	
2	3	Something That We Do	Clint Black	
11	1	Still Holding On	Clint Black & Martina McBride	
31	16	The Swing	James Bonamy	
2	7	Thank God for Believers	Mark Chesnutt	
15	10	That's Another Song	Bryan White	
1	1	There Goes	Alan Jackson	
1	1	(This Ain't) No Thinkin' Thing	Trace Adkins	
6	11	This Night Won't Last Forever	Sawyer Brown	
3	7	Today My World Slipped Away	George Strait	
15	24	The Trouble with the Truth	Patty Loveless	
3	3	Unchained Melody	LeAnn Rimes	
4	13	Watch This	Clay Walker	
1	1	We Danced Anyway	Deana Carter	
2	2	We Were in Love	Toby Keith	
26	19	What If I Do	Mindy McCready	
15	26	What If It's You	Reba McEntire	
2	2	What the Heart Wants	Collin Raye	
10	12	Whatever Comes First	Sons of the Desert	
2	4	When I Close My Eyes	Kenny Chesney	
13	6	When Love Starts Talkin'	Wynonna Judd	
6	8	Where Corn Don't Grow	Travis Tritt	
2	2	Who's Cheatin' Who	Alan Jackson	
8	9	Why Would I Say Goodbye	Brooks & Dunn	
8	8	You and You Alone	Vince Gill	
14	37	You Don't Seem to Miss Me	Patty Loveless	

=== Singles released by Canadian artists ===
US	CAN	Single	Artist	Reference
—	10	Ain't No Justice	Greg Hanna	
—	3	Almost Always	Chris Cummings	
—	4	The Answer Is Yes	Michelle Wright	
—	3	Born Again in Dixieland	Jason McCoy	
—	9	The Craziest Thing	Rick Tippe	
—	19	A Dozen Red Roses	Joan Kennedy	
10	1	Emotional Girl	Terri Clark	
—	10	Girl Out of the Ordinary	Beverley Mahood	
48	7	God Bless the Child	Shania Twain	
—	11	Heaven Help Her Heart	Jason McCoy	
—	7	I Give You My Word	George Fox	
39	1	I Meant to Do That	Paul Brandt	
—	1	I'm Feeling Kind of Lucky Tonight	Charlie Major	
—	20	Indian Woman	Montgomery Steele	
49	16	Just the Same	Terri Clark	
—	3	Let It Rain	Shirley Myers	
45	1	A Little in Love	Paul Brandt	
—	1	Little Ol' Kisses	Julian Austin	
—	12	A Little Thing Called Love	Beverley Mahood	
—	15	Lonely Gypsy Wind	Farmer's Daughter	
1	1	Love Gets Me Every Time	Shania Twain	
—	19	Lying Here with You	Thomas Wade & Wayward	
—	17	The Night the Barn Burned Down	George Fox	
—	10	Now That I'm On My Own	Farmer's Daughter	
—	4	One Way Track	Prairie Oyster	
—	15	The Real Thing	Rick Tippe	
—	12	She Won't Be Lonely Long	Prairie Oyster	
—	6	She's Getting Serious	Thomas Wade & Wayward	
—	10	She's Tough	Duane Steele	
—	20	Slow Turning	Sean Hogan	
—	4	Somewhere Inside	Chris Cummings	
38	1	Take It from Me	Paul Brandt	
—	9	Tell the Girl	Duane Steele	
—	8	This Crazy Heart of Mine	Charlie Major	
—	19	Tonight There's a Blue Moon	Prairie Oyster	
—	4	What Love Looks Like	Michelle Wright	
—	19	What's It Gonna Take	Denise Murray	
—	19	Wild Rose	Sean Hogan	
—	8	You Said	Farmer's Daughter	

== Top new album releases ==
US	CAN	Album	Artist	Record label
45	8	An Intimate Evening with Anne Murray	Anne Murray	Capitol
24		Back to You	Anita Cochran	Warner Bros.
23	31	Be Good at It	Neal McCoy	Atlantic
23	11	The Best of Billy Ray Cyrus: Cover to Cover	Billy Ray Cyrus	Mercury Nashville
4	3	The Best of Collin Raye: Direct Hits	Collin Raye	Epic
8		The Best of John Denver Live	John Denver	Legacy
7	26	Big Time	Trace Adkins	Capitol Nashville
24		Blink of an Eye	Ricochet	Columbia
	1	Butterfly Kisses (Shades of Grace)	Bob Carlisle	DMG
1	1	Carrying Your Love with Me	George Strait	MCA Nashville
16		A Celebration of Life/The Last Recordings	John Denver	River North
	4	CMT Canada '97	Various Artists	BMG
4	6	The Coast Is Clear	Tracy Lawrence	Atlantic
9	8	Collection	Wynonna Judd	Curb/MCA Nashville
1	1	Come On Over	Shania Twain	Mercury/PolyGram
15	11	Complicated	Tanya Tucker	Capitol Nashville
12		A Country Superstar Christmas	Various Artists	Hip-O
16	28	Crazy Nights	Lonestar	BNA
5	2	Dancin' on the Boulevard	Alabama	RCA Nashville
8		Dream Walkin'	Toby Keith	Mercury Nashville
	11	Everything's Alright	Charlie Major	ViK.
1	1	Everywhere	Tim McGraw	Curb
4	7	Evolution	Martina McBride	RCA Nashville
	19	The Gift	Jim Brickman	Windham Hill
	10	Greatest Country Love Songs	Various Artists	MCA
8		Greatest Hits	Diamond Rio	Arista Nashville
5		Greatest Hits	Neal McCoy	Atlantic
5	11	Greatest Hits	John Michael Montgomery	Atlantic
6		Greatest Hits	Pam Tillis	Arista Nashville
17		Greatest Hits... And Then Some	Aaron Tippin	RCA Nashville
2	1	The Greatest Hits Collection	Brooks & Dunn	Arista Nashville
5		Here's Your Sign	Bill Engvall	Warner Bros.
24		A Holiday Album to Benefit St. Jude	Various Artists	BNA
10		I Will Stand	Kenny Chesney	BNA
12	12	If I Don't Stay the Night	Mindy McCready	BNA
22	32	Just Between You and Me	The Kinleys	Epic
	11	Kickin' Country 4	Various Artists	Sony
5	9	Labor of Love	Sammy Kershaw	Mercury/PolyGram
	1	Leahy	Leahy	Virgin
9		Lee Ann Womack	Lee Ann Womack	Decca Nashville
25	23	Let Me In	Chely Wright	MCA Nashville
8	10	Lila	Lila McCann	Asylum
9	31	Long Stretch of Lonesome	Patty Loveless	Epic
8		Love & Gravity	BlackHawk	Arista Nashville
15		Love Travels	Kathy Mattea	Mercury/PolyGram
17	13	Michael Peterson	Michael Peterson	Reprise
	1	New Country 4	Various Artists	Warner
4	5	Nothin' but the Taillights	Clint Black	RCA Nashville
15		One of the Fortunate Few	Delbert McClinton	Rising Tide
5	17	The Other Side	Wynonna Judd	Curb/Universal
50	1	Outside the Frame	Paul Brandt	Reprise
	17	Playin' for Keeps	Jason McCoy	Universal
7	15	The Right Place	Bryan White	Asylum
25		Roots and Wings	James Bonamy	Epic
4	7	Rumor Has It	Clay Walker	Giant
1	1	Sevens	Garth Brooks	Capitol Nashville
9		Shakin' Things Up	Lorrie Morgan	BNA
8		Six Days on the Road	Sawyer Brown	Curb
4		So Long So Wrong	Alison Krauss & Union Station	Rounder
1	1	(Songbook) A Collection of Hits	Trisha Yearwood	MCA Nashville
22	16	Stone Country: Songs of the Rolling Stones	Various Artists	Tommy Boy
48	22	Sunday Morning to Saturday Night	Matraca Berg	Rising Tide
19		Takin' the Country Back	John Anderson	Mercury Nashville
25		Thank God for Believers	Mark Chesnutt	Decca Nashville
	1	Tremolo	Blue Rodeo	Warner
1	1	Unchained Melody: The Early Years	LeAnn Rimes	Curb
8	8	Under the Covers	Dwight Yoakam	Reprise
	9	What My Heart Already Knows	Julian Austin	ViK.
1	1	You Light up My Life: Inspirational Songs	LeAnn Rimes	Curb

=== Other top albums ===
US	CAN	Album	Artist	Record label
26		Across My Heart	Kenny Rogers	Magnatone
40		Amazing Grace 2 – A Country Salute to Gospel	Various Artists	Sparrow
75		Annabelle's Wish Soundtrack	Various Artists	Rising Tide
45		The Best of Country	Various Artists	Madacy
29		The Best of Roy Orbison	Roy Orbison	Virgin
33		Big House	Big House	MCA Nashville
56		Billy Yates	Billy Yates	Almo Sounds
53		Bitter Sweet	Kim Richey	Mercury/PolyGram
45		Bluegrass Rules!	Ricky Skaggs	Rounder
75		Born Country	Alabama	BMG
69		The Buffalo Club	The Buffalo Club	Rising Tide
74		Burnin' Daylight	Burnin' Daylight	Curb
39		Butterfly Kisses	Jeff Carson	Curb
32		Come On Christmas	Dwight Yoakam	Reprise
75		Country Lovin' Songs from the Heart	Various Artists	Rhino
33		The Country Roads Collection	John Denver	RCA
44		Cowboy Up – The Official PRCA Rodeo Album	Various Artists	Edel America
75		Elvis Greatest Jukebox Hits	Elvis Presley	RCA
53		Every Night's a Saturday Night	Lee Roy Parnell	Arista Nashville
47		Gospel Super Hits Amazing Grace	Various Artists	Epic
74		The Girl Next Door	Crystal Bernard	River North
42		Hallelujah, He Is Born	Sawyer Brown	Curb
60		Hill Country Christmas	Willie Nelson & Bobbie Nelson	Finer Arts
75		Hits	Johnny Cash	Legacy
60		Hopechest	Stephanie Bentley	Epic
51		Hot Country '97	Various Artists	K-Tel
39		How Big a Boy Are Ya?	Roy D. Mercer	Capitol Nashville
43		How Big a Boy Are Ya? Volume 2	Roy D. Mercer	Capitol Nashville
31		How Big a Boy Are Ya? Volume 3	Roy D. Mercer	Capitol Nashville
53		I'd Be with You	Kippi Brannon	Curb
50		It's on the House	Emilio Navaira	Capitol Nashville
47		Little Texas	Little Texas	Warner Bros.
26		Live	Chris LeDoux	Capitol Nashville
32		Live at the Cimarron Ballroom	Patsy Cline	MCA Nashville
75		Merry Texas Christmas Y'all	Asleep at the Wheel	High Street
31		Peace in the Valley	Various Artists	Arista Nashville
69		Ray Stevens Christmas: Through a Different Window	Ray Stevens	MCA Nashville
31		The Songs of Jimmie Rodgers – A Tribute	Various Artists	Columbia
47		Tammy Graham	Tammy Graham	Career
44	36	The Truth	Brady Seals	Reprise
56		Three Chords and the Truth	Sara Evans	RCA Nashville
33		Twice Upon a Time	Joe Diffie	Epic
39		We Can't All Be Angels	David Lee Murphy	MCA Nashville
38		Whatever Comes First	Sons of the Desert	Epic
41		Words	Sherrié Austin	Arista Nashville

== Births ==
- March 25 – Zach John King, singer-songwriter of the 2020s ("Get to Drinkin'").
- June 12 – Ashley Cooke, singer-songwriter of the 2020s ("Your Place").
- September 26 – Zach Top, neotraditional country singer-songwriter of the 2020s ("Sounds Like the Radio", "I Never Lie")
- October 9 – Megan Moroney, singer of the 2020s ("Tennessee Orange", "Am I Okay?").
- December 20 – Chase Matthew, singer-songwriter of the 2020s ("Love You Again", "Darlin'").

== Deaths ==
- January 8 – Smiley Bates, 59, Canadian singer, songwriter, and multi-instrumentalist (Cancer).
- January 21 — Colonel Tom Parker, 87, manager of prolific country singers Eddy Arnold and Hank Snow, comedian Minnie Pearl
- June 19 — Bobby Helms, 62, singer who enjoyed his peak popularity in 1957; best known for "Jingle Bell Rock."
- August 16 – Donn Reynolds, 76, singer-songwriter and country yodeler; established 2 yodeling world records.
- October 12 — John Denver, 53, country crossover artist of the 1970s; also a singer and songwriter (plane crash)
- December 21 — Amie Comeaux, 21, country singer from Louisiana (car accident)
- December 31 — Floyd Cramer, 64, prolific session pianist (lung cancer)

== Hall of Fame inductees ==
=== Bluegrass Music Hall of Fame inductees ===
- Josh Graves

=== Country Music Hall of Fame inductees ===
- Harlan Howard (1927–2002)
- Brenda Lee (born 1944)
- Cindy Walker (1915–2006)

=== Canadian Country Music Hall of Fame inductees ===
- Family Brown
- Sam Sniderman

== Major awards ==
=== Grammy Awards ===
- Best Female Country Vocal Performance — "How Do I Live", Trisha Yearwood
- Best Male Country Vocal Performance — "Pretty Little Adriana", Vince Gill
- Best Country Performance by a Duo or Group with Vocal — "Looking In the Eyes of Love", Alison Krauss & Union Station
- Best Country Collaboration with Vocals — "In Another's Eyes", Garth Brooks and Trisha Yearwood
- Best Country Instrumental Performance — "Little Liza Jane", Alison Krauss & Union Station
- Best Country Song — "Butterfly Kisses", Bob Carlisle and Randy Thomas
- Best Country Album — Unchained, Johnny Cash
- Best Bluegrass Album — So Long So Wrong, Alison Krauss & Union Station

=== Juno Awards ===
- Country Male Vocalist of the Year — Paul Brandt
- Country Female Vocalist of the Year — Shania Twain
- Country Group or Duo of the Year — Farmer's Daughter

=== Academy of Country Music ===
- Entertainer of the Year — Garth Brooks
- Song of the Year — "It's Your Love," Stephony Smith
- Single of the Year — "It's Your Love," Tim McGraw and Faith Hill
- Album of the Year — Carrying Your Love with Me, George Strait
- Top Male Vocalist — George Strait
- Top Female Vocalist — Trisha Yearwood
- Top Vocal Duo or Group — Brooks & Dunn
- Top New Male Vocalist — Kenny Chesney
- Top New Female Vocalist — Lee Ann Womack
- Top New Vocal Duo or Group — The Kinleys
- Video of the Year — "It's Your Love", Tim McGraw and Faith Hill (Director: Sherman Halsey)
- Vocal Event of the Year — "It's Your Love", Tim McGraw with Faith Hill

=== ARIA Awards ===
(presented in Sydney on September 22, 1997)

- Best Country Album - The Road Less Travelled (Graeme Connors)

=== Canadian Country Music Association ===
- CMT Maple Leaf Foods Fans' Choice Award — Terri Clark
- Male Artist of the Year — Paul Brandt
- Female Artist of the Year — Terri Clark
- Group or Duo of the Year — Farmer's Daughter
- SOCAN Song of the Year — "I Do", Paul Brandt
- Single of the Year — "I Do", Paul Brandt
- Album of the Year — Just the Same, Terri Clark
- Top Selling Album — The Woman in Me, Shania Twain
- Video of the Year — "I Do", Paul Brandt
- Wrangler Rising Star Award — Julian Austin
- Vocal Collaboration of the Year — "Two Names on an Overpass", Duane Steele and Lisa Brokop

=== Country Music Association ===
- Entertainer of the Year — Garth Brooks
- Song of the Year — "Strawberry Wine", Matraca Berg and Gary Harrison
- Single of the Year — "Strawberry Wine", Deana Carter
- Album of the Year — Carrying Your Love with Me, George Strait
- Male Vocalist of the Year — George Strait
- Female Vocalist of the Year — Trisha Yearwood
- Vocal Duo of the Year — Brooks & Dunn
- Vocal Group of the Year — Diamond Rio
- Horizon Award — LeAnn Rimes
- Music Video of the Year — "455 Rocket", Kathy Mattea (Director: Steven Goldmann)
- Vocal Event of the Year — "It's Your Love", Tim McGraw (featuring Faith Hill)
- Musician of the Year — Brent Mason

=== RPM Big Country Awards ===
- Canadian Country Artist of the Year — Paul Brandt
- Best Country Album — Calm Before the Storm, Paul Brandt
- Best Country Single — "My Heart Has a History", Paul Brandt
- Male Artist of the Year — Paul Brandt
- Female Artist of the Year — Terri Clark
- Group of the Year — Farmer's Daughter
- Outstanding New Artist — Chris Cummings
- Canadian Country Video — "My Heart Has a History", Paul Brandt
- Top Country Composer(s) — Shania Twain

== Other links ==
- Country Music Association
- Inductees of the Country Music Hall of Fame
