= The Very Best of John Michael Montgomery =

Greatest hits album by John Michael Montgomery
- Released: August 26, 2003
- Genre: Country
- Label: Warner Bros. Nashville
- Producer: Various original producers New material produced by Byron Gallimore; Compilation produced by James Austin and Paige Levy

John Michael Montgomery chronology
Pictures (2002)	The Very Best of John Michael Montgomery (2003)	Mr. Snowman (2003)

The Very Best of John Michael Montgomery is a compilation album released in 2003 by American country music artist John Michael Montgomery. It features eighteen songs from his first studio albums, ranging from his 1992 debut "Life's a Dance" to 2002's "'Til Nothing Comes Between Us". The tracks "Cool" and "One Day Less" were previously unreleased, and both produced by Byron Gallimore. "Cool" was later released on Montgomery's 2004 album Letters from Home, while "One Day Less" is not on any of his other albums.

== Track listing ==
1. "Be My Baby Tonight" (Richard Fagan, Ed Hill) - 2:50
2. "Sold (The Grundy County Auction Incident)" (Fagan, Robb Royer) - 2:30
3. "Life's a Dance" (Allen Shamblin, Steve Seskin) - 3:09
4. "I Swear" (Gary Baker, Frank J. Myers) - 4:24
5. "The Little Girl" (Harley Allen) - 3:53
6. "If You've Got Love" (Mark D. Sanders, Seskin) - 3:54
7. "I Love the Way You Love Me" (Chuck Cannon, Victoria Shaw) - 4:01
8. "Cover You in Kisses" (Jess Brown, Jerry Kilgore, Brett Jones) - 3:56
9. "Rope the Moon" (Jim Denton, Aggie Brown, J. Brown) - 4:06
10. "I Can Love You Like That" (Steve Diamond, Maribeth Derry, Jennifer Kimball) - 3:53
11. "How Was I to Know" (Will Rambeaux, Blair Daly) - 4:16
12. "Hold On to Me" (Rambeaux, Daly) - 4:10
13. "No Man's Land" (John Scott Sherrill, Seskin) - 3:02
14. "Home to You" (Arlos Smith, Sara Light) - 3:27
15. "Friends" (Jerry Holland) - 3:52
16. "Angel in My Eyes" (Daly, Tony Mullins) - 3:34
17. "Long as I Live" (Rick Bowles, Will Robinson) - 4:17
18. "'Til Nothing Comes Between Us" (Rebecca Marshall, Kerry Harvick, Tony Marty) - 4:44
19. "Cool" (Allen, Brice Long) - 3:38
20. "One Day Less" (Tom Douglas, Josh Leo, Stan Lynch) - 3:29

== Chart performance ==
Chart (2003)	Peak position
U.S. Billboard Top Country Albums	11
U.S. Billboard 200	77
