= Greatest Hits (John Michael Montgomery album) =

Greatest hits album by John Michael Montgomery
- Released: October 14, 1997
- Studio: Track 13 recorded at Ocean Way Nashville (Nashville, Tennessee) and mixed at Masterfonics (Nashville, Tennessee)
- Genre: Country
- Length: 50:14
- Label: Atlantic
- Producer: Scott Hendricks; Doug Johnson; Csaba Petocz

John Michael Montgomery chronology
What I Do the Best (1996)	Greatest Hits (1997)	Leave a Mark (1998)

Singles from Greatest Hits
- 1. "Angel in My Eyes" Released: September 29, 1997

Professional ratings
Review scores
Source	Rating
Allmusic	link

Greatest Hits is the first compilation album by American country music artist John Michael Montgomery; it was released in 1997 on Atlantic Records. The track "Angel in My Eyes" was newly recorded for this compilation and released as a single, peaking at #4 on the Billboard country music charts in 1998.

In August 1999 the album was certified Platinum by the RIAA.

== Track listing ==
No.	Title	Writer(s)	Length
1.	"Sold (The Grundy County Auction Incident)"	Richard Fagan, Robb Royer	2:30
2.	"If You've Got Love"	Mark D. Sanders, Steve Seskin	3:54
3.	"Rope the Moon"	Jimmy Denton, Aggie Brown, Jess Brown	4:06
4.	"I Love the Way You Love Me"	Chuck Cannon, Victoria Shaw	4:01
5.	"Friends"	Jerry Holland	3:52
6.	"Cowboy Love"	Bill Douglas, Jeff Wood	3:12
7.	"I Miss You a Little"	Fagan, John Michael Montgomery, Mike Anthony	4:12
8.	"Beer and Bones"	Sanger D. Shafer, Lonnie Williams	3:38
9.	"I Can Love You Like That"	Steve Diamond, Maribeth Derry, Jennifer Kimball	3:53
10.	"No Man's Land"	John Scott Sherrill, Seskin	3:02
11.	"Be My Baby Tonight"	Fagan, Ed Hill	2:50
12.	"I Swear"	Gary Baker, Frank J. Myers	4:24
13.	"Angel in My Eyes"	Blair Daly, Tony Mullins	3:31
14.	"Life's a Dance"	Allen Shamblin, Seskin	3:09

== Personnel ==
Angel in My Eyes

- John Michael Montgomery – vocals
- Steve Nathan – acoustic piano
- Dann Huff – electric guitars
- Michael Spriggs – acoustic guitars
- Bobby Terry – electric guitars
- Bruce Bouton – steel guitar
- Mike Brignardello – bass
- Shannon Forrest – drums
- Larry Franklin – fiddle
- Curtis Young – backing vocals

=== Production ===
- Scott Hendricks – producer (1–3, 6, 9–12)
- Doug Johnson – producer (4, 8, 14)
- Csaba Pectoz – producer (5, 7)
- Zal Schreiber – mastering (1–12, 14) at Atlantic Studios (New York City, New York)

Credits for Track 13

- Csaba Pectoz – producer, overdub recording, mixing
- Joe Chiccarelli – track recording
- Glenn Spinner – tracking assistant
- Aaron Swihart – tracking assistant
- David Hall – mix assistant
- Glenn Meadows – mastering at Masterfonics
- Mike "Frog" Griffith – production coordinator
- Lisa Roy – production coordinator

== Chart performance ==
=== Weekly charts ===
Chart (1997)	Peak position
Canadian Country Albums (RPM)	11
US Billboard 200	33
US Top Country Albums (Billboard)	5

=== Year-end charts ===
Chart (1997)	Position
US Top Country Albums (Billboard)	72
Chart (1998)	Position
US Billboard 200	195
US Top Country Albums (Billboard)	20
Chart (1999)	Position
US Top Country Albums (Billboard)	66

== Certifications ==
Region	Certification	Certified units/sales
United States (RIAA)	Platinum	1,000,000^{^}
^{^} Shipments figures based on certification alone.
