= How Was I to Know =

How Was I to Know may refer to:

- "How Was I to Know" (Reba McEntire song), 1996
- "How Was I to Know" (John Michael Montgomery song), 1997
