= Letters from Home (album) =

Studio album by John Michael Montgomery
- Released: April 20, 2004
- Recorded: 2003–2004
- Studio: Ocean Way Recording, Essential Sound and Stringtown Records (Nashville, Tennessee)
- Genre: Country
- Length: 37:52
- Label: Warner Bros. Nashville
- Producer: Byron Gallimore, John Michael Montgomery

John Michael Montgomery chronology
Pictures (2002)	Letters from Home (2004)	Time Flies (2008)

Professional ratings
Review scores
Source	Rating
AllMusic	3/5 stars

Letters From Home is the ninth studio album by American country music artist John Michael Montgomery. The album was released on April 20, 2004. It features the singles "Letters from Home", "Goes Good with Beer" and "Cool" from The Very Best of John Michael Montgomery. Although "Cool", the first single, failed to chart, the title track reached #2 on the Hot Country Songs charts in mid-2004, becoming Montgomery's first Top 10 country hit since "The Little Girl" in 2000. "Goes Good with Beer" peaked at #51 on the same chart, and after its release, he exited Warner Bros.' roster.

== Track listing ==
No.	Title	Writer(s)	Length
1.	"Good Ground"	Bill Luther, Bob Regan, Naoise Sheridan	4:09
2.	"Letters from Home"	Tony Lane, David Lee	4:27
3.	"That's What I'm Talking About"	Paul Nelson, Tom Shapiro	3:24
4.	"Look at Me Now"	Mike Geiger, Vicky McGehee, D. Vincent Williams	3:22
5.	"Goes Good with Beer"	Casey Beathard, Ed Hill	4:26
6.	"Cool"	Harley Allen, Brice Long	3:38
7.	"It Rocked"	Marty Dodson, Paul Overstreet	3:50
8.	"That Changes Everything"	Lane, Lee	3:57
9.	"Break This Chain"	Jim Collins, Billy Yates	2:52
10.	"Little Devil"	Blair Daly, Danny Orton	3:47
Total length:			37:52

== Personnel ==
As listed in liner notes.

- John Michael Montgomery – lead vocals
- Steve Nathan – keyboards
- Byron Gallimore – synth horns, synth strings, acoustic guitars, electric guitars, baritone electric guitar
- Tom Bukovac – electric guitars
- Brent Mason – electric guitars
- B. James Lowry – acoustic guitars
- Biff Watson – acoustic guitars
- Paul Franklin – steel guitar
- Russ Pahl – steel guitar
- Mark Casstevens – banjo
- Michael Rhodes – bass
- Glenn Worf – bass
- Lonnie Wilson – drums
- Stuart Duncan – fiddle
- Larry Franklin – fiddle
- Kirk "Jelly Roll" Johnson – harmonica
- Russell Terrell – backing vocals

=== Production ===
- Missi Gallimore – A&R direction
- Paige Levy – A&R direction
- Byron Gallimore – producer, mixing
- John Michael Montgomery – producer
- Julian King – recording, vocal recording
- John Kunz – vocal recording
- David Bryant – recording assistant
- Jason Gantt – additional recording, mix assistant
- Erik Lutkins – mix assistant
- Hank Williams – mastering at MasterMix (Nashville, Tennessee)
- Kim Drummond – art direction, design
- Darren Welch – art direction, design
- Jim Shea – photography
- Jennifer Kemp – stylist
- Carole Frazier – hair, grooming

== Charts ==
=== Weekly charts ===
Chart (2004)	Peak position
US Billboard 200	31
US Top Country Albums (Billboard)	3

=== Year-end charts ===
Chart (2004)	Position
US Top Country Albums (Billboard)	58
