= Dillon Carmichael =

American singer-songwriter

- Born: November 8, 1993 (age 32); Burgin, Kentucky, U.S.
- Origin: Nashville, Tennessee, U.S.
- Genre: Country
- Occupation: Singer-songwriter
- Instruments: Vocals, Guitar, Drums
- Years active: 2018-present
- Label: Riser House Entertainment

Dillon Carmichael (born November 8, 1993) is an American country music singer. He signed to Riser House Entertainment in 2017 where he released his debut single, "I Do for You". In 2021 Carmichael released the Hot Beer EP, which included the title single. Later in 2021, Carmichael delivered his second album, Son of A, consisting of fourteen tracks with songs written by Michael Hardy and Ashley Gorley. As well as songs written with Jessi Alexander, and David Lee Murphy.

== Biography ==
Carmichael grew up in Burgin, Kentucky. He came from a musical family that included several other musicians, including two of his uncles: singers John Michael Montgomery and Eddie Montgomery, the latter a member of Montgomery Gentry.

Carmichael began playing guitar at age 12, and joined his friends at talent shows in his area. At age 17, he and his family were contacted by a representative of The Song Factory publishing company, who encouraged Carmichael to move to Nashville, Tennessee, after he had graduated from high school. In 2018, he was recommended to record producer Dave Cobb, who produced Carmichael's debut album Hell on an Angel in 2018. On August 21, 2018, Carmichael made his Grand Ole Opry debut. He had spent a year and half as a security guard at the Opry from 2015 to 2016. In addition to playing at the Grand Ole Opry, Carmichael has played multiple festivals and toured with Brooks & Dunn,Lynyrd Skynyrd, Luke Bryan, Cody Johnson, and Jon Pardi.

Rolling Stone Country described the album as "Featuring his signature booming baritone vocals and a sonic blend that mixes the hard-nosed Outlaw country with the melodic edge of Southern rock." In 2020, Dillon charted on Country Airplay with the single release "I Do for You".

Carmichael released his sophomore LP Son of A (a 2021 release co-produced by Jon Pardi), with the title track earning his top Country Airplay position to date. In 2024, he was named a New Face of Country Music by Country Radio Seminar.

Carmichael's most recent album, 2025's Keepin' Country Alive, endlessly spotlights the emotional impact of Carmichael's storytelling, whether he is paying homage to the beauty of the rural life ("Home", "Good Ol' Day") or on a gritty anthem like "Raised Up Wrong".

== Discography ==
=== Albums ===
| Title | Album details | Peak chart positions |
| Title | Album details | US Indie |
|---|---|---|
| Hell on an Angel | Release date: August 17, 2018; Label: Riser House; Format: CD, music download | 37 |
| Son of A | Release date: October 22, 2021; Label: Riser House; Format: CD, music download | — |
| Keepin' Country Alive | Release date: June 13, 2025; Label: Riser House; Format: CD, music download | — |

=== Singles ===
| Year | Single | Peak chart positions | Album |
| Year | Single | US Country Airplay | Album |
|---|---|---|---|
| 2019 | "I Do for You" | 40 | —N/a |
| 2021 | "Hot Beer" | 53 | Son of A |
| 2021 | "Son of A" | 31 | Son of A |
| 2023 | "Drinkin' Problems" | 31 | —N/a |
| 2025 | "She Gone" | — | Keepin' Country Alive |
"—" denotes a recording that did not chart.
