= What I Do the Best =

Studio album by John Michael Montgomery
- Released: September 24, 1996
- Recorded: 1996
- Studio: Masterfonics, The Tracking Room, Sound Emporium Studios, Emerald Sound Studios, Woodland Sound Studios, Marsh Laboratory and The Mix Room (Nashville, TN); Sound Kitchen (Franklin, TN); Twin Creeks (Brentwood, TN); New River Studio (Fort Lauderdale, FL)
- Genre: Country
- Length: 35:04
- Label: Atlantic
- Producer: Csaba Petocz

John Michael Montgomery chronology
John Michael Montgomery (1995)	What I Do the Best (1996)	Greatest Hits (1997)

Singles from What I Do the Best
- 1. "Ain't Got Nothin' on Us" Released: August 26, 1996; 2. "Friends" Released: September 23, 1996; 3. "I Miss You a Little" Released: February 17, 1997; 4. "How Was I to Know" Released: June 9, 1997

What I Do the Best is the fourth studio album by American country music artist John Michael Montgomery. The tracks "Ain't Got Nothin' on Us", "Friends", "How Was I to Know" and "I Miss You a Little" were all released as singles, peaking at #15, #2, #2 and #6, respectively on the Hot Country Songs charts, making this the first album of his career not to produce a #1 hit. The album was certified platinum by the RIAA for one million shipments in the US.

"Cloud 8" was later recorded by Canadian country artist Gil Grand on his 1998 debut album Famous First Words.

Professional ratings
Review scores
Source	Rating
AllMusic	3/5 stars
Entertainment Weekly	(B+) link

== Track listing ==
No.	Title	Writer(s)	Length
1.	"Ain't Got Nothin' on Us"	Jim Robinson, Wendell Mobley	2:48
2.	"A Few Cents Short"	John Michael Montgomery	3:24
3.	"Friends"	Jerry Holland	3:52
4.	"Lucky Arms"	J. B. Rudd, Vip Vipperman	2:40
5.	"What I Do the Best"	Michael Huffman, Donny Kees, Monty Holmes	3:18
6.	"Cloud 8"	Byron Hill, Tony Martin	3:49
7.	"I Can Prove You Wrong"	Greg McDougal, Monty Criswell, Billy Spencer	3:59
8.	"How Was I to Know"	Will Rambeaux, Blair Daly	4:16
9.	"Paint the Town Redneck"	Richard Fagan, Steve O'Brien	2:36
10.	"I Miss You a Little"	Montgomery, Fagan, Mike Anthony	4:12

== Personnel ==
As listed in liner notes.

- John Michael Montgomery – vocals
- Barry Beckett – keyboards
- Carl Marsh – keyboards
- Steve Nathan – keyboards
- Larry Byrom – electric guitars
- Dann Huff – electric guitars
- John McFee – electric guitars
- Brent Rowan – electric guitars
- Don Potter – acoustic guitars
- Billy Joe Walker Jr. – acoustic guitars
- Biff Watson – acoustic guitars
- Paul Franklin – steel guitar
- Michael Rhodes – bass guitar
- Leland Sklar – bass guitar
- Eddie Bayers – drums
- Steve Brewster – drums
- Terry McMillan – percussion, harmonica
- Glen Duncan – fiddle
- Louis Dean Nunley – backing vocals
- John Wesley Ryles – backing vocals
- Dennis Wilson – backing vocals
- Curtis "Mr. Harmony" Young – backing vocals

=== Production ===
- Csaba Petocz – producer, additional recording, mixing
- Joe Chiccharelli – recording, additional recording
- David Hall – recording assistant, additional recording
- Brad Kinney – assistant engineer
- Chris Stone – assistant engineer
- Mike Clute – mixing (10)
- Brian K. Lee – mastering at Gateway Mastering (Portland, Maine)
- Lisa Roy – production manager
- P. David Eleazar – art direction, design
- Nick Long – art direction, design
- Jim "Señior" McGuire – photography
- Lynne Cook – photography assistant
- R.B. Miller – photography assistant

== Charts ==
=== Weekly charts ===
Chart (1996)	Peak position
Canadian Country Albums (RPM)	14
US Billboard 200	39
US Top Country Albums (Billboard)	5

=== Year-end charts ===
Chart (1996)	Position
US Top Country Albums (Billboard)	62

== Certifications ==
Region	Certification	Certified units/sales
United States (RIAA)	Platinum	1,000,000^{^}
^{^} Shipments figures based on certification alone.
