= Brand New Me (John Michael Montgomery album) =

Studio album by John Michael Montgomery
- Released: September 19, 2000
- Studio: Emerald Sound Studios, Soundshop Recording Studios and Westwood Studios (Nashville, Tennessee)
- Genre: Country
- Length: 35:43
- Label: Atlantic Nashville
- Producer: Buddy Cannon; John Michael Montgomery; Norro Wilson

John Michael Montgomery chronology
Home to You (1999)	Brand New Me (2000)	Pictures (2002)

Singles from Brand New Me
- 1. "The Little Girl" Released: August 14, 2000; 2. "That's What I Like About You" Released: January 8, 2001; 3. "Even Then" Released: May 14, 2001

Professional ratings
Review scores
Source	Rating
Allmusic	3/5 stars

Brand New Me is the seventh studio album by American country music artist John Michael Montgomery, released on September 19, 2000, via Atlantic Nashville and was the last album he released for the label before Atlantic Records closed the country division. Produced by Montgomery, Buddy Cannon, and Norro Wilson, it includes ten tracks.

The album spawned three singles in the form of "The Little Girl", "That's What I Like About You", and "Even Then", the first becoming the final number one single of his career on the US Billboard Hot Country Songs chart. The latter two would fail to reach the top forty, with "Even Then" becoming his least successful single to date. Brand New Me has been certified Gold by the Recording Industry Association of America (RIAA), the last of his studio albums to be certified.

"That's Not Her Picture" was previously cut by Jason Sellers on his 1999 album A Matter of Time, and "Thanks for the G Chord" was originally recorded by Canadian artist Gil Grand on his 1998 album Famous First Words.

== Track listing ==
Brand New Me track listing
No.	Title	Writer(s)	Length
1.	"Brand New Me"	Kris Bergsnes; Lee Thomas Miller	3:35
2.	"Bus to Birmingham"	Tony Lane; Jess Brown	4:04
3.	"Weekend Superstar"	George Molton	2:31
4.	"Thanks for the G Chord"	Byron Hill; Mark Narmore	4:04
5.	"Even Then"	Pat Bunch; Shane Teeters	3:49
6.	"That's What I Like About You"	Richard Fagan; Larry Alderman	3:05
7.	"That's Not Her Picture"	Bill Anderson; Gary Burr	3:18
8.	"The Little Girl"	Harley Allen	3:52
9.	"Real Love"	Neil Thrasher; Kent Blazy	3:04
10.	"I Love It All"	John Michael Montgomery; Blair Daly	4:14
Total length:			35:36

== Personnel ==
Musicians

- John Michael Montgomery – lead vocals, electric guitars (10)
- Randy McCormick – Hammond B3 organ (1, 4, 7), keyboards (2–5), acoustic piano (6, 9, 10)
- Bobby Ogdin – acoustic piano (1, 7), Hammond B3 organ (10)
- John Hobbs – acoustic piano (2–5), Hammond B3 organ (6, 8)
- Steve Nathan – keyboards (8, 10)
- J. T. Corenflos – electric guitars
- Dale Oliver – electric guitars
- Troy Lancaster – electric guitars (1)
- John Willis – acoustic guitars (1–9)
- Brent Mason – electric guitars (3)
- B. James Lowry – acoustic guitars (10)
- Scotty Sanders – lap steel guitar (1)
- Tommy White – steel guitar (1–6, 8–10)
- Paul Franklin – dobro (2, 4), steel guitar (7)
- Dan Tyminski – mandolin (8)
- Larry Paxton – bass
- Chad Cromwell – drums
- Glen Duncan – fiddle (1–6, 9), mandolin (2, 4, 5)
- Larry Franklin – fiddle (1, 7, 8, 10)

Background vocals

- Wes Hightower – backing vocals (1, 2, 4–6, 9)
- Dennis Wilson – backing vocals (1, 3, 5, 7, 10)
- Melonie Cannon – backing vocals (2, 9)
- Dan Tyminski – backing vocals (2, 4, 6, 8)
- Curtis Young – backing vocals (3, 7, 10)
- Alison Krauss – backing vocals (8)
- Kim Fleming – backing vocals (9)
- Garnet Imes – backing vocals (9)
- Liana Manis – backing vocals (9)
- Blair Daly – backing vocals (10)

=== Production ===
- Buddy Cannon – producer
- John Michael Montgomery – producer
- Norro Wilson – producer
- Billy Sherrill – engineer
- Butch Carr – mixing, additional engineer (2, 5, 8, 10)
- Jim Cotton – mixing, additional engineer
- Mark Capps – second engineer (1, 7, 8, 10)
- Jason Piske – second engineer, additional engineer (5, 6)
- John Saylor – second engineer (1–4, 6–10)
- Graham Lewis – mix assistant, second engineer (2, 5, 10)
- Dave Beller – second engineer (2–4, 6)
- Scott Kidd – second engineer (3, 7, 10)
- Jason Breckling – second engineer (9, 10)
- Bob Bullock – additional engineer (9)
- Tony Castle – editing (2, 4, 6, 9, 10)
- Christopher Rowe – editing (7)
- Denny Purcell – mastering at Georgetown Masters (Nashville, Tennessee)
- Shannon Finnegan – production coordinator
- Connie Baer – creative director
- Angela Haglund – art direction, design
- Pamela Springsteen – photography
- Debra Wingo – make-up
- Renee Fowler – stylist

== Charts ==
=== Weekly charts ===
Chart (2000)	Peak position
Canadian Country Albums (RPM)	4
US Billboard 200	15
US Top Country Albums (Billboard)	2

=== Year-end charts ===
Chart (2000)	Position
US Top Country Albums (Billboard)	32
Chart (2001)	Position
US Top Country Albums (Billboard)	27

== Certifications ==
Region	Certification	Certified units/sales
United States (RIAA)	Gold	500,000^{^}
^{^} Shipments figures based on certification alone.
