= Home to You =

Studio album by John Michael Montgomery
- Released: May 25, 1999
- Studio: Sound Emporium Studios (Nashville, Tennessee)
- Genre: Country
- Length: 31:23
- Label: Atlantic
- Producer: Garth Fundis

John Michael Montgomery chronology
Leave a Mark (1998)	Home to You (1999)	Brand New Me (2000)

Singles from Home to You
- 1. "Hello L.O.V.E." Released: March 27, 1999; 2. "Home to You" Released: July 5, 1999; 3. "Nothing Catches Jesus by Surprise" Released: December 4, 1999; 4. "You Are" Released: January 15, 2000

Professional ratings
Review scores
Source	Rating
AllMusic	3/5 stars
Entertainment Weekly	B−

Home to You is the sixth studio album by the American country music artist John Michael Montgomery, released in 1999. It includes the singles "Hello L.O.V.E.", "Home to You", "You Are", and "Nothing Catches Jesus By Surprise". "Hello L.O.V.E." reached #15 on the Billboard country charts and the title track peaked at #2. The latter two singles both failed to make Top 40, thus becoming the first singles of Montgomery's career to miss Top 40. It was also the first album of Montgomery's career not to receive an RIAA certification.

"You Are" was later released by Chad Brock in 2004.

== Track listing ==
No.	Title	Writer(s)	Length
1.	"Love Made Me Do It"	Jason Sellers, Keith Sewell, Wendy Buckner	2:17
2.	"Hello L.O.V.E."	Jeffrey Steele, Danny Wells	2:25
3.	"Home to You"	Arlos Smith, Sara Light	3:28
4.	"Your Love Lingers On"	Waylon Jennings, Rory Feek	3:35
5.	"You Are"	Steve Dean, Wil Nance, Noah Gordon	3:22
6.	"Sinkin' In"	George Teren, Steven Dale Jones	2:48
7.	"Holdin' an Amazing Love"	Gary Harrison, Shane Teeters	2:46
8.	"When Your Arms Were Around"	Steve Stapler, Aaron Sain	4:12
9.	"Love Is Our Business"	Rebecca Lynn Howard, Rob Matson, Marty Dodson	2:38
10.	"Nothing Catches Jesus by Surprise"	Jennings, Tom Douglas	3:33

== Personnel ==
Adapted from liner notes

- John Michael Montgomery – lead vocals, harmony vocals (10)
- Steve Nathan – acoustic piano (1–3, 5–10), keyboards (3, 10), organ (4, 6)
- Brent Mason – electric guitars
- Darrell Scott – acoustic guitars (1–4, 6, 8–10), backing vocals (4), mandolin (5)
- Biff Watson – acoustic guitars (5, 7)
- Paul Franklin – electric slide guitar (1, 10), steel guitar (2–9)
- Sam Bush – mandolin (8)
- Jerry Douglas – dobro (9)
- Glenn Worf – bass (1, 3–5, 7, 8, 10)
- Dave Pomeroy – bass (2, 6, 9)
- Greg Morrow – drums
- Sam Bacco – percussion (2–4, 6, 10)
- Larry Franklin - fiddle (4, 5)
- Wendy Buckner – backing vocals (1)
- Jason Sellers – backing vocals (1), harmony vocals (7)
- Keith Sewell – backing vocals (1)
- Larry Marrs – harmony vocals (2)
- Garth Fundis – harmony vocals (3, 10)
- Curtis "Mr. Harmony" Young – harmony vocals (3, 5)
- John Wesley Ryles – harmony vocals (4, 6, 8)
- Dennis Wilson – harmony vocals (5)
- Liana Manis – harmony vocals (6)
- Rebecca Lynn Howard – harmony vocals (9)

=== Production ===
- Garth Fundis – producer, mixing
- Dave Sinko – recording, mixing
- Matt Andrews – recording assistant, additional recording
- Denny Purcell – mastering at Georgetown Masters (Nashville, Tennessee)
- Scott Paschall – production assistant
- Virginia Team – art direction
- Team Design – design
- Beverly Parker – photography
- Holly Ballard – make-up
- Libby Joiner – stylist
- John Dorris – management for Hallmark Direction

== Chart performance ==
=== Weekly charts ===
Chart (1999)	Peak position
Canadian Country Albums (RPM)	11
US Billboard 200	135
US Top Country Albums (Billboard)	16

=== Year-end charts ===
Chart (1999)	Position
US Top Country Albums (Billboard)	67
