= Montgomery Steele =

- Born: Monty Petrick
- Origin: Dawson Creek, British Columbia, Canada
- Genres: Country
- Occupation: Singer
- Instrument: Vocals
- Years active: 1997-present
- Labels: MSI Records

Montgomery Steele is a Canadian country music artist. Steele's 1997 album, First Time Out, became the first 100% Canadian content debut CD to chart five consecutive Top 30 singles on the RPM charts. Steele's Top 30 singles include "Indian Woman," "In This Heart of Mine," "The River Song," "Red Wine Kisses" and "Debbie Darlene."

== Discography ==
=== Albums ===
Year	Album
1997	First Time Out

=== Singles ===
Year	Single	Chart Positions		Album
Year	Single	CAN Country	CAN AC	Album
1997	"Indian Woman"	20	48	First Time Out
1997	"In This Heart of Mine"	22	—	First Time Out
1998	"The River Song"	19	—	First Time Out
1998	"Red Wine Kisses"	22	—	First Time Out
1999	"Debbie Darlene"	27	—	First Time Out
2000	"Damned Old Rodeo"	*	—	Single only
