= Ain't Got Nothin' on Us =

Single by John Michael Montgomery

from the album What I Do the Best
- Released: August 26, 1996
- Recorded: 1996
- Genre: Country
- Length: 2:48
- Label: Atlantic
- Songwriters: Jim Robinson, Wendell Mobley
- Producer: Csaba Petocz

John Michael Montgomery singles chronology
"Long as I Live" (1996)	"Ain't Got Nothin' on Us" (1996)	"Friends" (1996)

"Ain't Got Nothin' on Us" is a song written by Jim Robinson and Wendell Mobley, and recorded by American country music artist John Michael Montgomery. It was released in August 1996 as the lead single from his album What I Do the Best. It peaked at number 15 in the United States, while in Canada it peaked at number 3.

== Critical reception ==
Larry Flick, of Billboard magazine reviewed the song favorably saying that the production is "effective with a more live sound that makes the drums and piano sound as if they are only a few feet away from the listener." He goes on to say that Montgomery turns in an "enjoyable performance that seems relaxed, as if he were just reveling in the mood of the song without a care in the world."

== Music video ==
The music video was directed by Martin Kahan and premiered in mid-1996.

== Chart positions ==
"Ain't Got Nothin' on Us" debuted at number 38 on the U.S. Billboard Hot Country Singles & Tracks for the week of September 14, 1996.

Chart (1996)	Peak position
Canada Country Singles (RPM)	3
US Bubbling Under Hot 100 (Billboard)	15
US Hot Country Songs (Billboard)	15

=== Year-end charts ===
Chart (1996)	Position
Canada Country Tracks (RPM)	85
