= Greg Hanna =

- Origin: Finch, Ontario, Canada
- Genres: Country
- Occupation: singer-songwriter
- Instrument: Vocals
- Years active: 1995–present
- Labels: Pheromone/MegaForce/Sony
- Website: Official website

Greg Hanna (born in Finch, Ontario, Canada) is a male Canadian country music singer. Signing with his own independent label in 1995, Hanna charted several singles on the RPM Country Tracks chart in Canada, including the top ten hit "Ain't No Justice" from 1997, but his debut album was never issued. In 2005, Hanna appeared on the third season of Nashville Star, but dropped out after receiving an offer to work with producer Chris Farren. In 2007, Hanna toured Canada as the opening act for Canadian country band Emerson Drive's Countrified Tour. Hanna's debut self-titled album was issued in October 2009 in the United States and Canada on his own US record label imprint, Pheromone Records LLC; with MegaForce Records and Sony. From his debut CD in the US and Canada came the releases "It's a Man's Job," "What Kind of Love Are You On" and "Makin' Love Real." Their supporting music videos which earned Hanna exposure on television networks such as CMT, GAC and TCN. In 2010, Hanna signed with the Paradigm agency for representation and booked his first major US tour as opening act on the American Ride Tour for Toby Keith and Trace Adkins.

== Discography ==
=== Greg Hanna (2009) ===
Greg Hanna

Studio album by Greg Hanna
- Released: October 13, 2009
- Genre: Country
- Length: 40:51
- Label: Pheromone/MegaForce/Sony
- Producer: Buddy Cannon; Chris Farren; Greg Hanna; Kim Tribble

1. "Bump in the Road" (David Lee Murphy, Kim Tribble) – 3:34
2. "It's a Man's Job" (Ashley Gorley, Wade Kirby, Tribble) – 3:23
3. "Live for Today" (Greg Hanna, Tribble) – 3:51
4. "Makin' Love Real" (Hanna, James Dean Hicks, Tribble) – 4:13
5. "Hillbilly Heartattack" (Hanna, Shane Minor) – 3:20
6. "She Means Everything to Me" (Murphy, Tribble) – 3:48
7. "What Kind of Love Are You On" (Hanna, Murphy, Tribble) – 3:42
8. "In Between Dreams" (Hanna, Brad Mates, Minor) – 3:51
9. "Only One Lover" (Keith Follesé, Tribble) – 3:53
10. "Singin' to the Radio" (Hanna, Kirby, Tribble) – 4:00
11. "Song in My Head" (Chris Farren, Gorley, Hanna) – 3:16

=== Singles ===
1995–1997

Year	Single	Peak positions	Album
Year	Single	CAN Country	Album
1995	"Hillbilly Boy with the Rock 'N Roll Blues"	27	—
1996	"Natural Born Thriller"	50	—
1997	"Ain't No Justice"	10	—

2005–present

Year	Single	Album
2005	"Song in My Head"	—
2005	"Love You for Life"	—
2006	"Blame It on Me"	—
2007	"Singin' to the Radio"	Greg Hanna
2008	"Better Day Comin'"	—
2008	"She Means Everything to Me"	Greg Hanna
2009	"It's a Man's Job"	Greg Hanna
2010	"What Kind of Love Are You On"	Greg Hanna
2011	"Makin' Love Real"	Greg Hanna
2013	"It Rained"	Picture This
2014	"Gimme More Money"	Picture This
2015	"I'm Searchin' Too"	Picture This

=== Music videos ===
Year	Video	Director
1997	"Ain't No Justice"	Terrence O'Dette
2009	"It's a Man's Job"	Stephano Barberis
2010	"What Kind of Love Are You On"	Chad Denning
2011	"Makin' Love Real"	Warren P. Sonoda
2013	"It Rained"	Marcel/Greg Hanna
2014	"Gimme More Money"	Marcel/Greg Hanna
