= Ain't No Justice =

Single by Greg Hanna
- Released: 1997
- Genre: Country
- Label: Psychabilly
- Songwriters: Kim Tribble; Greg Hanna; Cyril Rawson
- Producer: Kim Tribble

Greg Hanna singles chronology
"Natural Born Thriller" (1996)	"Ain't No Justice" (1997)	"Song in My Head" (2005)

"Ain't No Justice" is a song recorded by Canadian country music artist Greg Hanna. It was released in 1997 as Hanna's third single. It peaked at number 10 on the RPM Country Tracks chart in November 1997.

== Chart performance ==
Chart (1997)	Peak position
Canada Country Singles (RPM)	10

=== Year-end charts ===
Chart (1997)	Position
Canada Country Tracks (RPM)	98
