= John Michael Montgomery =

American country music singer (born 1965)

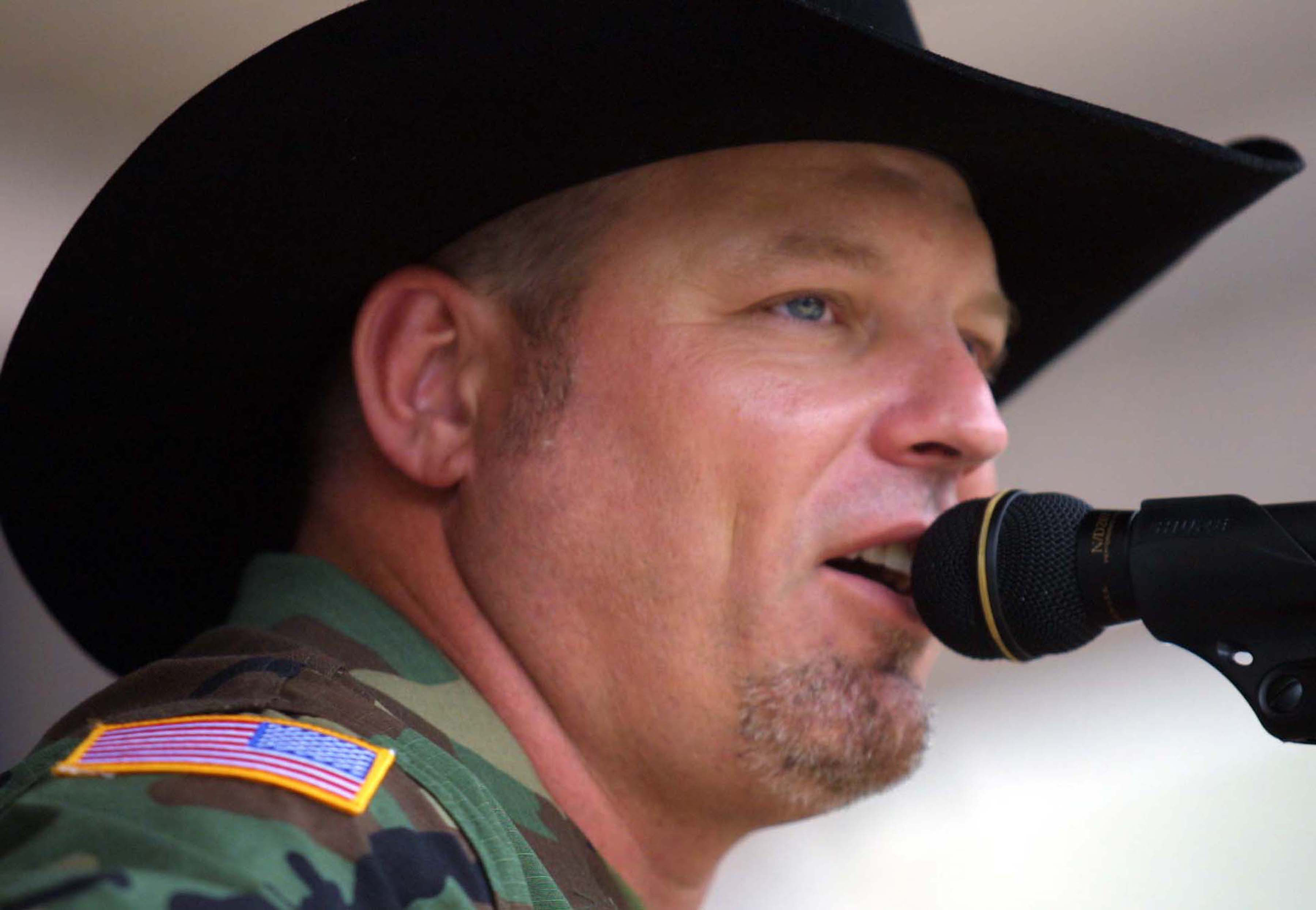
- Montgomery performing in 2004
- Born: January 20, 1965 (age 61); Danville, Kentucky, U.S.
- Occupations: Singer; songwriter
- Years active: 1992–2025
- Spouse: Crystal White (m. 1996)
- Children: 2
- Relatives: Eddie Montgomery (brother); Dillon Carmichael (nephew); Travis Denning (son-in-law)
- Musical career
- Genre: Country
- Instruments: Vocals; Guitar
- Works: Discography
- Labels: Atlantic Nashville; Warner Nashville; Stringtown
- Formerly of: Early Tymz

John Michael Montgomery (born January 20, 1965) is an American country music singer. He has had more than 30 singles on the Billboard Hot Country Songs charts. This total includes seven number-one singles: "I Love the Way You Love Me", "I Swear", "Be My Baby Tonight", "If You've Got Love", "I Can Love You Like That", "Sold (The Grundy County Auction Incident)", and "The Little Girl". "I Swear" and "Sold" were ranked as the number-one songs on the Billboard Year-End charts for country music in 1994 and 1995, respectively. Several of Montgomery's singles crossed over to the Billboard Hot 100, his highest peak there having been achieved by "Letters from Home" in 2004. Montgomery has released ten studio albums: seven through Atlantic Records Nashville, two via parent company Warner Records Nashville, and one on his own Stringtown label. His first three albums, Life's a Dance (1992), Kickin' It Up (1994), and John Michael Montgomery (1995), are all certified multi-platinum by the Recording Industry Association of America (RIAA); 1996's What I Do the Best is certified platinum; while Leave a Mark (1998) and Brand New Me (2000) are certified gold. Montgomery has won four Academy of Country Music awards and two Country Music Association awards.

Montgomery's musical style includes a mix of country pop ballads and up-tempo material, and he has seen mixed to positive critical reception. Many critics have compared his musical image and singing voice to those of Garth Brooks. "I Swear" and "I Can Love You Like That" were both covered by All-4-One, while "I Love the Way You Love Me" was covered by Boyzone. His brother Eddie founded the duo Montgomery Gentry in the late 1990s; his nephew Dillon Carmichael and son-in-law Travis Denning are also country music singers.

== Early life ==
John Michael Montgomery was born January 20, 1965, in Danville, Kentucky, as the second of three children to Harold and Carol Montgomery. The family grew up in nearby Nicholasville. Harold was a local musician who played at various honky-tonks throughout Kentucky and taught John Michael how to play guitar at an early age. By the time Montgomery was 15 years old, he began playing rhythm guitar in his family's band, Harold Montgomery and the Kentucky River Express, which his brother Eddie later joined as well. During his senior year of high school, Montgomery stocked frozen food at a local grocery store and lived with his grandmother after her husband died. These circumstances led to Montgomery missing over 70 days of school before deciding to drop out and complete his education through General Educational Development (GED).

Following their parents' divorce, Eddie and John Michael founded another group called Early Tymz, also known as John Michael Montgomery and Young Country, which had a regular performing gig at Austin City Saloon in Lexington, Kentucky. The brothers shared an apartment, and John Michael worked at a liquor store to support them financially. John Michael dated a hairstylist named Kelly Welch for three years, and briefly became engaged to her, but later reneged as he wanted to focus on music. Additionally, he had his truck repossessed after missing loan payments; as Welch's grandmother co-signed the loan, Welch sued Montgomery for $5,000 before settling out of court. In 1990, Montgomery performed a solo show at the Congress Inn, another bar in Lexington, where he was discovered by music manager Estill Sowards. Sowards came in contact with representatives of the Nashville division of Atlantic Records, who also attended the Congress Inn to hear his performances. He signed to Atlantic Records Nashville in 1991, and spent the next year selecting and recording songs.

== Musical career ==
=== 1992–1993: Life's a Dance ===
The label originally selected songwriter and guitarist Wyatt Easterling to serve as Montgomery's producer, but Montgomery was unsatisfied with Easterling's production and song choices. In response, Montgomery called Rick Blackburn (then-vice president of Atlantic Records's Nashville division) in the middle of the night to demand a different producer. Although Montgomery feared his actions would be negatively received, Blackburn ultimately recommended producer Doug Johnson. Blackburn allowed Montgomery to discard six songs recorded with Easterling in favor of ones selected by him and Johnson. Contributing musicians included guitarist Brent Rowan, bassist Willie Weeks, and drummer Owen Hale. The four songs from Easterling and six from Johnson became Montgomery's debut album Life's a Dance. Atlantic released the title track (written by Steve Seskin and Allen Shamblin) as the lead single in September 1992, prior to the album's release in October. The song peaked at number four on the Billboard Hot Country Singles & Tracks (now Hot Country Songs) charts. "I Love the Way You Love Me" was the second single. Written by Chuck Cannon and Victoria Shaw, the song became Montgomery's first number-one single on the country charts in 1993. It also went to number 60 on the Billboard Hot 100. In 1998, Irish group Boyzone released a cover version of the song. "Beer and Bones", the last single from the project, was less successful on the country music charts with a peak at number 21. All three of the album's singles were among the tracks produced by Johnson. Also included on the album was a cover of Rex Allen Jr.'s 1984 single "Dream On Texas Ladies".

Life's a Dance was met with mixed critical reception. Brian Mansfield reviewed the album favorably for AllMusic, praising Montgomery's baritone singing voice and the Western swing influence on certain tracks. The Spokesman-Review writer Debbie Fichtenberg Lind rated the album "B". Her review was also positive toward Montgomery's singing voice and the lyrics of the first two singles, but was more critical toward the lyrics of "Beer and Bones" and "Dream On Texas Ladies". Billy Altman of Entertainment Weekly considered both the lyrics of "Life's a Dance" and Montgomery's overall musical image derivative of Garth Brooks, and rated the album "D". In 1995, Life's a Dance achieved a triple-platinum certification from the Recording Industry Association of America (RIAA), honoring shipments of three million copies. Montgomery was nominated for a Horizon Award (now known as Best New Artist) from the Country Music Association (CMA) in both 1993 and 1994, and won the award in the latter year. At the 1993 Academy of Country Music (ACM) Awards, Montgomery won Top New Male Vocalist, while "I Love the Way You Love Me" won Song of the Year.

=== 1994–1995: Kickin' It Up ===
Montgomery's second Atlantic album, 1994's Kickin' It Up, was led off by the single "I Swear". Written by Gary Baker and Frank J. Myers, it became Montgomery's second number-one single, as well as his longest-tenured at four weeks. Billboard later ranked it as the number-one country single of 1994 on their Year-End charts. Additionally, it achieved a number 42 entry on the Hot 100. Soon after Montgomery's rendition, contemporary R&B group All-4-One released a cover version, which went on to become a number-one single on the Hot 100. The album itself peaked at number one on both Top Country Albums and the Billboard 200, accounting for his only number-one entry on the latter. Its next single, "Rope the Moon", peaked at number four on the country charts; during this song's chart run, the album cut "Kick It Up" also charted for two weeks from unsolicited airplay. After these songs, both "Be My Baby Tonight" and "If You've Got Love" topped the country charts in 1994. Richard Fagan and Ed Hill wrote the former, while Seskin and Mark D. Sanders wrote the latter. Scott Hendricks produced the album, with musical contributors including guitarists Dann Huff and Brent Mason; vocalists John Wesley Ryles and Harry Stinson; pianists Reese Wynans and John Barlow Jarvis; drummer Lonnie Wilson; and bassist Glenn Worf. Of the album's sound, Montgomery stated that he wanted it to be "rowdier" than his debut, which he felt lacked upbeat material outside "Beer and Bones".

Writing for AllMusic, Michael McCall thought the album benefited from having more upbeat material than its predecessor, although he also noted that it still had "contemporary ballads" such as "I Swear". Mansfield similarly opined in a review for New Country magazine that the album was more energetic than his debut, citing "Be My Baby Tonight" and "Friday at Five" as examples. "I Swear" won both Single of the Year and Song of the Year from the Academy of Country Music, and Single of the Year from the Country Music Association. It also accounted for his first nomination from the Grammy Awards, in the category of Best Male Country Vocal Performance. Kickin' It Up was certified quadruple-platinum in 1996. Montgomery promoted the album by touring as an opening act for Reba McEntire. Due to the commercial success, Montgomery said he was offered multiple opportunities to perform as a headlining act, but he declined as he thought he "was definitely not in the mental state" to do so.

=== 1995–1996: John Michael Montgomery ===
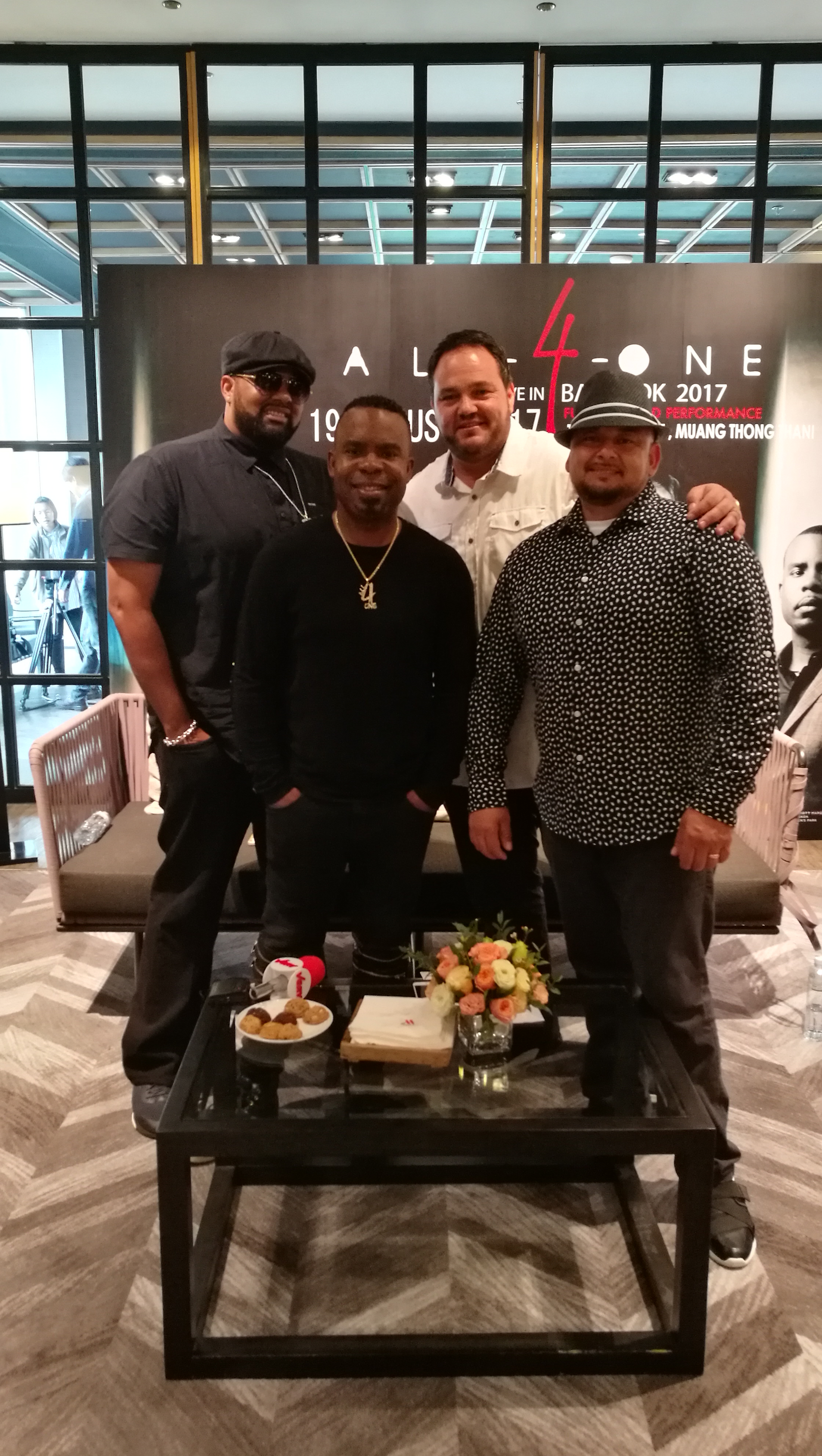
R&B group All-4-One covered John Michael Montgomery's "I Swear" and "I Can Love You Like That".

In 1995, Montgomery released his third, self-titled studio album. It was led off by the ballad "I Can Love You Like That", which went to number one on the country music charts early in the year. Like "I Swear" before it, "I Can Love You Like That" was also covered by All-4-One, whose version was a top-five hit on the Hot 100. The album's second single, "Sold (The Grundy County Auction Incident)" (co-written by Fagan and former Bread member Robb Royer), became Montgomery's sixth number-one on Hot Country Songs in mid-1995. It went on to rank on Billboard Year-End as the top country song of 1995. Three more singles reached top five on the country charts between then and early 1996: "No Man's Land" (co-written by Seskin), "Cowboy Love", and "Long as I Live". Another track from the album, "Holdin' Onto Something", was also recorded by Jeff Carson, whose version was a top-ten country hit in 1996. Stephen Thomas Erlewine wrote in AllMusic, "the record doesn't sound dull or repetitive. Most of the album's success is due to the clean, commercial production, which makes even the weak material entertaining." Mansfield, in a review for New Country, thought the album "contains nearly everything that's predictable about modern country", although he also praised the Southern rock influence of "It's What I Am" and the lyrics of "No Man's Land". John Michael Montgomery, like its predecessor, was certified quadruple-platinum. The Country Music Association nominated it for Album of the Year, and Montgomery himself for Male Vocalist of the Year, while the music video for "Sold" received a Video of the Year nomination form the Academy of Country Music. Additionally, the Grammy Awards nominated John Michael Montgomery for Best Country Album, and "I Can Love You Like That" for Best Male Country Vocal Performance, with these representing his last nominations from that academy.

Despite his prior apprehensions, Montgomery began touring as a headliner in 1995 to promote his self-titled album. During these tours, he noticed he had begun to experience inconsistencies with his vocal tone in concert. Montgomery observed that he had begun experiencing occasional difficulties singing live in 1993, but that the problem had exacerbated by 1995. Consultants at Vanderbilt University Medical Center encouraged him to undergo rehabilitation. He initially refused, but later changed his mind after experiencing a persistent sore throat and difficulty speaking. A second consultation at Vanderbilt University Medical Center revealed that he had an infected salivary gland, which was surgically removed. Montgomery performed "Sold" at the annual Country Music Association awards telecast in November 1995, two weeks after his surgery.

=== 1996–1997: What I Do the Best and Greatest Hits ===
Montgomery took another hiatus from touring in 1996, which resulted in him not performing any concerts at all that year. He later attributed this hiatus to a bout of depression he felt after the death of his father, Harold, in 1994, followed by his marriage and the birth of his daughter in 1996. Billboard writer Deborah Evans Price stated that a factor in this hiatus was wanting to maintain a better balance between his professional and personal lives. She reported that Blackburn, during a 1996 visit to Montgomery's house, successfully convinced him to stop smoking and drinking alcohol. He released his fourth studio album What I Do the Best that same year. Due to Hendricks taking up a position as president of Capitol Records Nashville, he was unavailable as a producer. As a result, Montgomery selected Australian-Hungarian sound engineer Csaba Petocz to produce instead. Montgomery and Blackburn chose "Ain't Got Nothin' on Us" as lead single due to its up-tempo Western swing sound, compared to the ballads that led previous albums. However, a station in Texas began playing "Friends" after the album's release, causing the latter to enter the charts. In response, Atlantic withdrew "Ain't Got Nothin' on Us" in favor of promoting "Friends" as the album's second single. "Ain't Got Nothin' on Us" fell from its peak of number fifteen on Hot Country Songs, while "Friends" ascended to its peak of number two on that chart by year's end, in addition to reaching number 69 on the Hot 100.

"I Miss You a Little" was the album's third single and Montgomery's first songwriting credit, shared with Fagan and Mike Anthony. The song is a tribute to Montgomery's father Harold, and its music video features pictures of him and his tombstone as well as an audio recording of him. Barbara Montgomery (John Michael's stepmother and Harold's widow) filed a lawsuit against him after the music video's release, claiming that the singer had not gotten permission from her to use his likeness. By October 1998, John Michael won the lawsuit. Both "I Miss You a Little" and its follow-up, "How Was I to Know", were top-ten country hits in 1997. During this album's promotion, Montgomery also provided vocals to "Warning Signs", a comedy routine by Bill Engvall set to music, which charted for five weeks while "How Was I to Know" was also ascending the charts. An uncredited review in Billboard considered What I Do the Best to be Montgomery's "strongest yet", highlighting the lyrics of "I Miss You a Little" as well as the "traditional" sound of Petocz's production. Journalist Nick Krewen was less favorable toward the album, as the thought the songs were inferior to those of previous albums and that Petocz's production did not fit with Montgomery's singing voice. The RIAA awarded What I Do the Best a platinum certification.

When Montgomery returned to touring in 1997, he reduced his number of shows per year from 150 to 50 as he felt he should "settle down". Also in 1997, Montgomery released his Greatest Hits package which included the new song "Angel in My Eyes", a top-five hit upon release to country radio that year. Writing for Country Standard Time, Walter Allread criticized Montgomery's "overly forceful" delivery of this song, and panned the album's packaging for resembling advertisements for blue jeans.

=== 1998–2001: Leave a Mark, Home to You, and Brand New Me ===
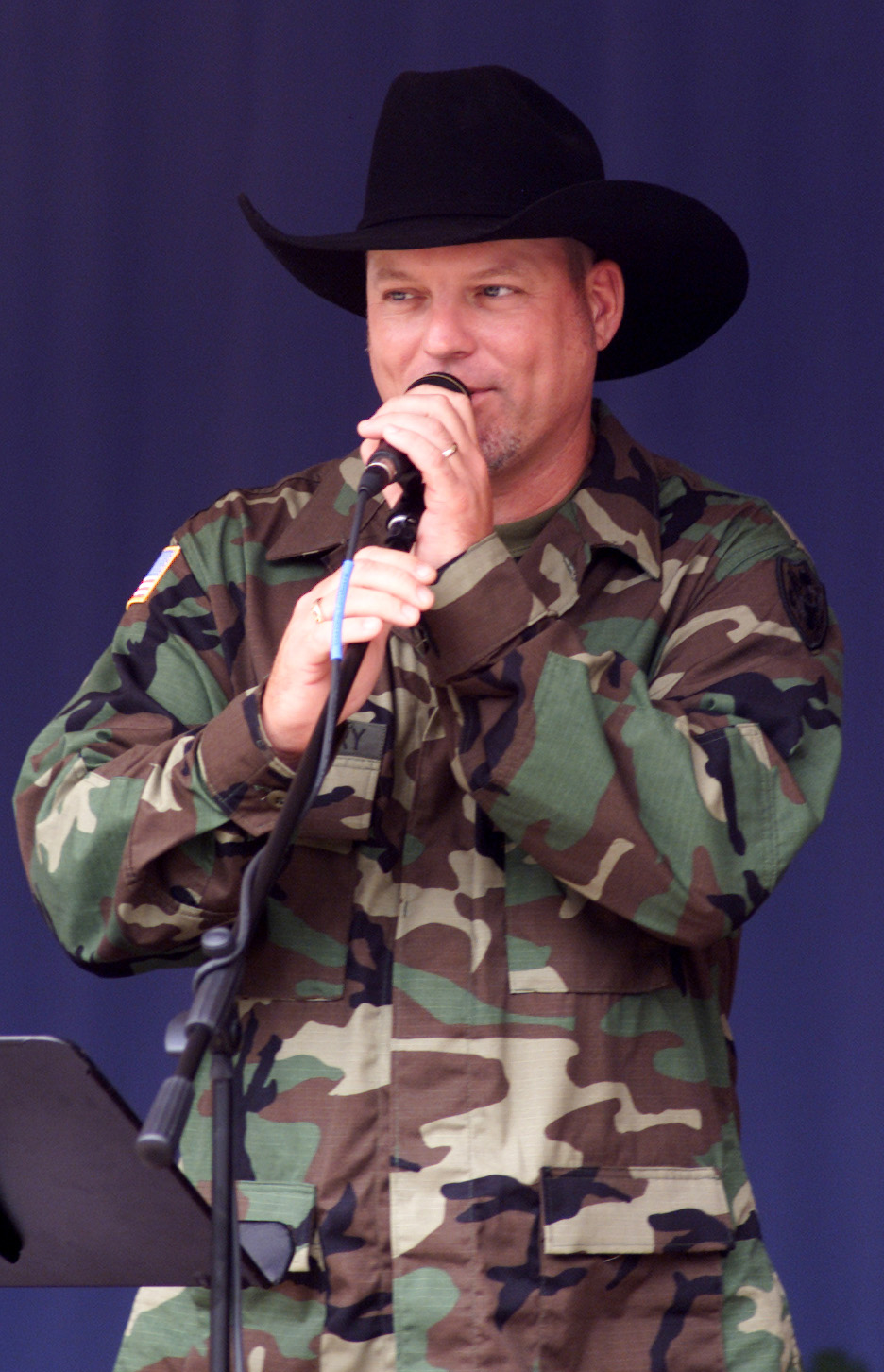
Montgomery performing at the Pentagon's center courtyard in 2004

After his Greatest Hits package came his next studio album, 1998's Leave a Mark. Montgomery co-produced with Petocz, accounting for the singer's first production credit. The album included bassist Mike Brignardello, steel guitar player Bruce Bouton (of Garth Brooks's studio band the G-Men), drummers Vinnie Colaiuta and Shannon Forrest, rhythm guitarist Biff Watson, and backing vocalist John Wesley Ryles. The track "You're the Ticket" was later recorded by Billy Hoffman and was a single for him in 2000. Montgomery co-wrote the title track with Elbert West, who would later record the song himself in 2001. The project's lead single was "Love Working on You", written by Jim Collins and Craig Wiseman. It was followed by the top-five hits "Cover You in Kisses" and "Hold On to Me" between late 1998 and early 1999. The latter was also a top-40 hit on the Hot 100. Writing for MusicRow magazine, Ron Young thought that Montgomery's vocals were stronger than on previous albums. He also thought that Petocz's production was "crisp and clear", although he felt some of the songs had "lightweight" lyrics. The album was certified gold after release, honoring shipments of 500,000 copies.

Montgomery ended the 1990s with his sixth studio release, Home to You (1999). Its lead single was the Jeffrey Steele composition "Hello L.O.V.E.", which peaked at fifteen on the country charts, followed by the title track at number two. The third and fourth singles, "Nothing Catches Jesus by Surprise" and "You Are", both fell short of the top 40. Chad Brock later charted his own rendition of "You Are" between late 2003 and early 2004. Garth Fundis produced the album, and contributed backing vocals to both the title track and "Nothing Catches Jesus by Surprise". Both the latter and "Your Love Lingers On" were co-written by Waylon Jennings. Jason Sellers and Rebecca Lynn Howard respectively co-wrote the tracks "Love Made Me Do It" and "Love Is Our Business", and provided backing vocals to their compositions. Erlewine noted that the album was more focused on ballads than previous efforts, and thought its tracks had the potential to be serviced to adult contemporary formats. Country Standard Time writer Jeffrey B. Remz thought the album's songs were "no different than sappy ballads from previous efforts" and observed that four of the ten songs had the word "love" in the title, although he also thought the inclusion of instruments such as fiddle and Dobro retained a country sound.

In 2000, Montgomery released his seventh album Brand New Me. He co-produced the project with Buddy Cannon (best known for his work with Kenny Chesney) and Norro Wilson. Lead single "The Little Girl", featuring backing vocals from Alison Krauss, became his seventh and final number-one on the Billboard country charts by year's end. Songwriter Harley Allen wrote the song after reading a story e-mailed to him by his brother, about a child who claims to see Jesus after witnessing her parents' death via murder-suicide. Snopes considered the story an urban legend, and a "fairly typical example" of inspirational contemporary folklore circulated via e-mail. "The Little Girl" was nominated by the Academy of Country Music for both Single and Song of the Year. Despite the success of this song, the follow-up singles "That's What I Like About You" and "Even Then" both failed to reach top 40 of the country charts. The album certified gold by the end of 2000. Maria Konicki Dinoia of AllMusic thought the stories of "Bus to Birmingham" and "Even Then" would appeal to fans of Montgomery's ballads, and that "Brand New Me" and "That's What I Like About You" would do likewise to fans who preferred his more up-tempo songs such as "Sold".

=== 2002–2004: Pictures and Letters from Home ===
Following the closure of Atlantic Records's country music division in 2001, Montgomery transferred to the Nashville branch of parent company Warner Bros. Records (now known as Warner Records). Before recording for Warner, he performed 71 concerts in 2001, all of which he had to perform while on crutches after breaking his shin. After this, he began recording the album Pictures in February 2002, before releasing it through Warner that October. Pictures also reunited him with Hendricks as producer. Sixwire (also recording on Warner at the time) provided backing vocals to the track "It Goes Like This", co-written by their lead guitarist Steve Mandile. The album's lead single was "'Til Nothing Comes Between Us", co-written by Kerry Kersh. While this song peaked in the top 20 of Hot Country Songs, follow-ups "Country Thang" and "Four Wheel Drive" peaked outside the top 40. Country Standard Time writer Dan MacIntosh said of the album's lyrical content, "He has nothing new to say here, nor does he come up with any novel ways to say the old things."

This project was followed in 2003 by a second compilation, The Very Best of John Michael Montgomery. It included most of his hit singles as well as new songs "One Day Less" and "Cool", both produced by Byron Gallimore. The latter was also sent to radio as a single. It was followed later in the year by Mr. Snowman, a Christmas album. The album included a mix of traditional Christmas songs such as "O Holy Night" and "Rudolph the Red-Nosed Reindeer", as well as the original "A Daddy's Prayer". Brian Wahlert of Country Standard Time criticized Montgomery's singing as "vanilla" on most of the tracks, but praised his vocal delivery on "A Daddy's Prayer". His ninth album and final for Warner, Letters from Home, was released in 2004. Also produced by Gallimore, this album accounted for his last top-ten country hit in its title track "Letters from Home", which spent four weeks at number two on the country charts and achieved his highest Hot 100 peak of number 24. Montgomery later observed the song's popularity with soldiers led to him performing at the Pentagon. The only other single from the album was "Goes Good with Beer". Erlewine wrote of this project that it "showcases the country crooner what he does best: smoothly singing heartache tunes, odes to the past, and love songs. It may not be a new beginning, but fans aren't likely to complain, either." After Letters from Home, Montgomery ended his contract with Warner; he stated in 2007 that he chose to leave Warner as he thought the label was focusing more heavily on finding new artists than promoting existing ones.

=== 2005–2024: Time Flies and retirement ===
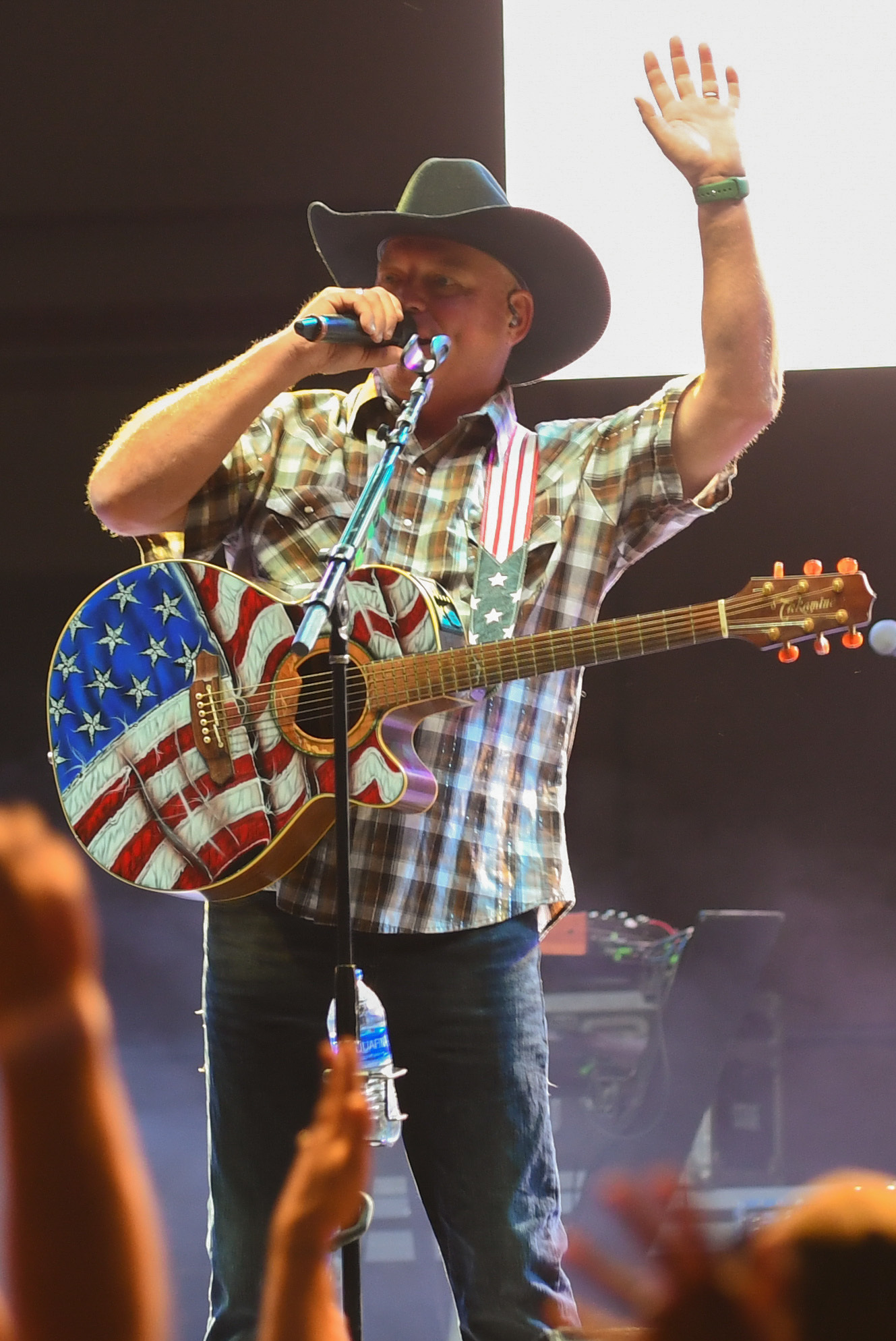
Montgomery in 2022

Montgomery made no new recordings in 2005 or 2006 after exiting Warner, although he continued to tour. In late 2007, Montgomery announced he was founding a new independent record label called Stringtown Records. Shelia Shipley Biddy served as the label's president. At the time of the label's foundation, he announced plans to release an album through it in 2008, with Gallimore continuing to serve as his producer. He stated that he chose to form his own label instead of signing with another one because he thought that most of the major country labels were going through mergers and acquisitions, while independent labels were becoming more popular by comparison. His only Stringtown album, Time Flies, came out in 2008. The album accounted for his last solo chart entry, the James T. Slater composition "Forever". Montgomery observed at the time that he did not have a radio single for about four years before "Forever", and that the long hiatus caused many radio stations to ignore the song. Similarly, he felt that radio programmers had begun to perceive him as an "older" artist, despite him being approximately the same age as contemporarily successful artists such as Keith Urban or Kenny Chesney. Reviewing the album for Country Standard Time, Jacquilynne Schlesier thought it was largely too similar to his previous releases, although she praised the lyrics of "Drunkard's Prayer", "All in a Day", and "Brothers 'til the End". In 2009, Montgomery provided guest vocals on country rap artist Colt Ford's "Ride Through the Country", a single from his album of the same name. This song accounted for Montgomery's 36th and final entry on Hot Country Songs.

Although he released no further albums, Montgomery continued to tour throughout the 2010s. One such concert during the former year was held at Naval Air Station Pensacola in Pensacola, Florida. In 2010, he founded a company called Montgomery Mix Pro, with intent of assisting new artists in creating material and assessing demo recordings to promote themselves. He said that both this venture and the founding of his own label were in response to his perception that the country music industry was more focused on making money and appealing to demographics, as opposed to creating music that was desired by fans. In 2011, Montgomery performed with Lorrie Morgan at Pine Knob Music Theatre in suburban Detroit. According to The Flint Journal, Montgomery considered himself a fan of Morgan's music, as well as that of Keith Whitley, to whom she is a widow. At the time, he also expressed interest in creating a live album interspersed with stories about the creation of each song.

In 2016, he said in an interview with the El Paso Times that he still enjoyed touring despite having not released new music in several years because he "love[d] to get on stage". He once again underwent vocal cord surgery in 2019, this time to remove a polyp that had formed on one of his vocal cords. Montgomery's tour bus overturned in a road accident near the Kentucky-Tennessee state line in 2022. The accident broke several of Montgomery's ribs. Soon after the accident, Montgomery released a statement on Facebook that he was successfully recovering from the accident.

In January 2024, Montgomery announced that he would retire from touring at the end of his 2024–25 tour schedule, although he did not give a reason. That same year, he joined Post Malone on the stage of the Grand Ole Opry for a rendition of "Be My Baby Tonight" to honor Post Malone's debut at that venue. Montgomery's final concert occurred on December 12, 2025, at Rupp Arena in Lexington.

== Musical style ==
Montgomery's musical style encompasses ballads and up-tempo material. Marjie McGraw, in The Encyclopedia of Country Music, thought that Montgomery "distinguished himself...with tender balladry" such as "I Love the Way You Love Me" and "I Swear"; she also described "Be My Baby Tonight" and "Sold (The Grundy County Auction Incident)" as "tongue twisters" in which he sang with a "manly baritone". Montgomery stated of his music in New Country magazine, "I want the youngest person and the oldest person to like it and understand it. It ain't too deep, but it ain't silly either." AllMusic writer Steve Huey described Montgomery as "[p]art of the '90s wave of honky-tonk hitmakers that brought country to new commercial heights" and states that he "made his name primarily as a romantic balladeer. Yet despite his sometime adult contemporary leanings, his vocal style remained solidly grounded in country tradition." Schlesier stated in her review of Time Flies, "Since his debut in 1992, John Michael Montgomery built a solid career on a foundation of power ballads and uptempo humorous songs." Remz, in a review of The Very Best of John Michael Montgomery, thought Montgomery had a "pretty decent baritone" and noted that, unlike many of his contemporaries, Montgomery generally did not write his own songs. Remz also observed the singer's success with "up-tempo" songs such as "Sold (The Grundy County Auction Incident)" and "Be My Baby Tonight", while considering ballads such as "I Swear" to be "syrupy". Mansfield wrote of Montgomery's singing voice on his ballads, "[h]owever limited it may be, Montgomery's tender baritone cuts to the emotional core of 'I Can Love You Like That' and 'No Man's Land'...these songs are easy to sing along with, and they're easy to take to heart." Writing for Country Universe, Leeann Ward stated that "Montgomery is mostly known for his sappy, country-pop love songs." Mansfield also opined that the covers of his songs by All-4-One, as well as his inclusion of Southern rock-styled electric guitar playing, showed that "[c]ountry folk have borrowed from pop music for generations". Montgomery has named Lionel Richie, Bob Seger, and George Strait as his main influences. He also stated that he personally selected songs he wanted to record, instead of relying on producers or song promoters to choose for him.

Montgomery was frequently contrasted with Garth Brooks. Colin Larkin, in The Virgin Encyclopedia of Country Music, wrote that "[i]n the mid-90s he stands as one of the hottest artists in country music, appealing to lovers of both Garth Brooks and Lynyrd Skynyrd." Of his concerts, Michael McCall of New Country magazine stated, "[h]e's not as rambunctious as Garth Brooks nor as showy as Neal McCoy, nor is he as still as George Strait or as reserved as Alan Jackson." McCall also noted positive reactions from female fans during ballads such as "I Swear", contrasted with his Southern rock influences as seen by the presence of multiple electric guitars in his road band, as well as Montgomery's own extended soloing during a performance of the Marshall Tucker Band's "Can't You See". Jack Hurst furthered the comparisons to Brooks in an article for the Chicago Tribune, as he thought the lyrical content of "Life's a Dance" was similar to Brooks's "The Dance", and the decision to include more upbeat material on Kickin' It Up was comparable to "Friends in Low Places". Additionally, Hurst noted the "exaggerated, hillbilly-ish pronunciations and half-yodeled yips popularized by Brooks" in Montgomery's vocal delivery. Conversely, Hurst noted that Montgomery had a taller and thinner body type than Brooks, and also stated that he "isn't nearly as eloquent and talkative as Brooks." Montgomery stated that he appreciated such comparisons when they concerned his potential to have a broad appeal to country music fans in a similar fashion to Brooks, but not when others felt his musical style was derivative of Brooks's.

== Personal life ==
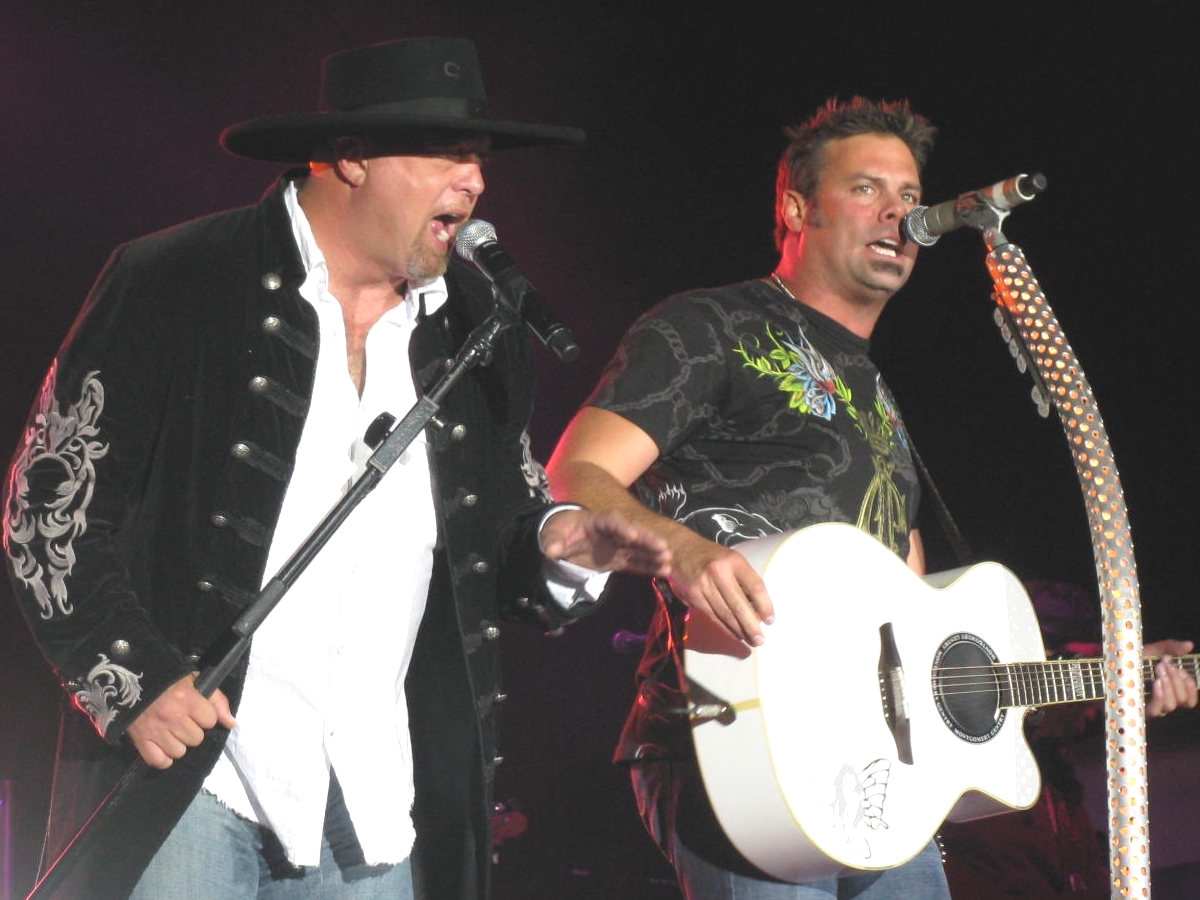
John Michael Montgomery's brother Eddie (left) founded the duo Montgomery Gentry (pictured in 2008, with Troy Gentry at right).

John Michael Montgomery's brother Eddie, with whom he performed in Early Tymz, worked as a member of his road crew in the 1990s. By the end of the decade, Eddie founded the duo Montgomery Gentry with Troy Gentry, also a former member of Early Tymz. Montgomery Gentry signed with Columbia Records Nashville in 1999, and charted multiple singles on that label between then and 2010. Gentry died in a helicopter crash in September 2017, although Eddie has continued to tour under the Montgomery Gentry name. The two brothers sang together for an acoustic concert at the Opera House in Lexington, Kentucky, in 2014. The song "Brothers 'til the End" from Time Flies is a tribute to Eddie. Both John Michael and Eddie are uncles of Dillon Carmichael, who is also a country music singer. John Michael Montgomery married Crystal White in 1996, and the couple had a daughter named Madison one year later. In 2023, Madison married country singer Travis Denning. John Michael also has a son named Walker, who released his own rendition of "I Love the Way You Love Me" in 2024. In May 2025, Walker became engaged to Krista Slaubaugh, one-half of the duo Tigirlily Gold. Eddie and Walker Montgomery, along with Denning, all performed at the singer's farewell concert in December 2025.

Between 2005 and 2008, Montgomery was the subject of a number of publicized health and legal issues. In March 2005 at the Golden Corral 500 (now known as the Quaker State 400), a NASCAR race held at Atlanta Motor Speedway, Montgomery opened the ceremonies with a performance of "The Star-Spangled Banner". He sang off-key and was visibly staggering throughout, causing many fans to believe he was drunk. In response, he issued an apology on his website, revealing he had been diagnosed with acoustic neuroma, a tumor on his inner ear which was negatively affecting his hearing and balance. In February 2006, Montgomery was arrested in Lexington, Kentucky, for driving under the influence, carrying prescription painkiller Endocet in an open container, and two counts of carrying a concealed weapon. His attorney issued a report stating that he had a permit for the weapon, as well as a prescription for the Endocet following a then-recent hip replacement surgery. In August 2006, Montgomery entered a plea deal which included paying over $600 in fines; the concealed weapon and prescription medicine charges were also dropped. Country Standard Time reported in May 2008 that Montgomery canceled a month's worth of concerts to enter drug rehabilitation after experiencing sleep disorder and anxiety issues, which resulted in the abuse of prescription painkillers. According to The Boot, Montgomery exited rehabilitation prior to the release of Time Flies.

== Discography ==
Studio albums

- Life's a Dance (1992)
- Kickin' It Up (1994)
- John Michael Montgomery (1995)
- What I Do the Best (1996)
- Leave a Mark (1998)
- Home to You (1999)
- Brand New Me (2000)
- Pictures (2002)
- Letters from Home (2004)
- Time Flies (2008)

== Awards and nominations ==
=== Grammy Awards ===
Year	Nominee / work	Award	Result
1995	"I Swear"	Best Male Country Vocal Performance	Nominated
1996	"I Can Love You Like That"	Best Male Country Vocal Performance	Nominated
1996	John Michael Montgomery	Best Country Album	Nominated

=== Academy of Country Music Awards ===
Year	Nominee / work	Award	Result
1994	John Michael Montgomery	Top New Male Vocalist	Won
1994	"I Love the Way You Love Me"	Song of the Year	Won
1995	"I Swear"	Song of the Year	Won
1995	"I Swear"	Single Record of the Year	Won
1996	"Sold (The Grundy County Auction Incident)"	Video of the Year	Nominated
2001	"The Little Girl"	Single Record of the Year	Nominated
2001	"The Little Girl"	Song of the Year	Nominated

=== Country Music Association Awards ===
Year	Nominee / work	Award	Result
1993	John Michael Montgomery	Horizon Award	Nominated
1994	John Michael Montgomery	Horizon Award	Won
1994	"I Swear"	Single of the Year	Won
1995	John Michael Montgomery	Male Vocalist of the Year	Nominated
1995	John Michael Montgomery	Album of the Year	Nominated
