= Home to You (song) =

Single by John Michael Montgomery

from the album Home to You
- Released: July 5, 1999
- Genre: Country
- Length: 3:27
- Label: Atlantic
- Songwriters: Arlos Smith; Sara Light
- Producer: Garth Fundis

John Michael Montgomery singles chronology
"Hello L.O.V.E." (1999)	"Home to You" (1999)	"The Little Girl" (2000)

"Home to You" is a song written by Arlos Smith and Sara Light, and recorded by American country music artist John Michael Montgomery. It was released in July 1999 as the second single and title track from the album Home to You. The song reached No. 2 on the Billboard Hot Country Singles & Tracks chart.

== Music video ==
The music video was directed by Jim Shea and premiered in late 1999.

== Chart performance ==
"Home to You" debuted at number sixty-two on the U.S. Billboard Hot Country Singles & Tracks for the week of July 17, 1999.

Chart (1999)	Peak position
Canada Country Singles (RPM)	8
US Billboard Hot 100	45
US Hot Country Songs (Billboard)	2

=== Year-end charts ===
Chart (1999)	Position
Canada Country Tracks (RPM)	34
US Country Songs (Billboard)	48

Chart (2000)	Position
US Country Songs (Billboard)	73
