= Hello L.O.V.E. =

Single by John Michael Montgomery

from the album Home to You
- Released: March 27, 1999
- Genre: Country
- Length: 2:25
- Label: Atlantic
- Songwriters: Jeffrey Steele; Danny Wells
- Producer: Garth Fundis

John Michael Montgomery singles chronology
"Hold On to Me" (1998)	"Hello L.O.V.E." (1999)	"Home to You" (1999)

"Hello L.O.V.E." is a song written by Jeffrey Steele and Danny Wells, and recorded by American country music artist John Michael Montgomery. It was released in March 1999 as the first single from his album Home to You. The song reached No. 15 on the Billboard Hot Country Singles & Tracks chart in June 1999.

== Music video ==
The music video was directed by Jim Shea and premiered in April 1999.

== Chart performance ==
Chart (1999)	Peak position
Canada Country Singles (RPM)	11
US Billboard Hot 100	71
US Hot Country Songs (Billboard)	15

=== Year-end charts ===
Chart (1999)	Position
Canada Country Tracks (RPM)	94
