= Angel in My Eyes =

Single by John Michael Montgomery

from the album Greatest Hits
- Released: September 29, 1997
- Recorded: 1997
- Genre: Country
- Length: 3:33
- Label: Atlantic
- Songwriters: Blair Daly; Tony Mullins
- Producer: Csaba Petocz

John Michael Montgomery singles chronology
"How Was I to Know" (1997)	"Angel in My Eyes" (1997)	"Love Working on You" (1998)

"Angel in My Eyes" is a song written by Tony Mullins and Blair Daly, and recorded by American country music artist John Michael Montgomery. It was released in September 1997 as the only single from his Greatest Hits compilation album. It peaked at number 4 in the United States, and number 6 in Canada.

== Content ==
The song is about a man who falls in love with a woman that he calls his angel in his eyes.

== Critical reception ==
Rick Anderson of Allmusic, in a review of a later Montgomery compilation, called the song "unusually complex and soulful". Walter Allread of Country Standard Time was mixed in his review of the Greatest Hits package, saying that Montgomery "aims at touchy-feely lovers, new parents[…] and the thousands who buy anything alluding to winged ones. Montgomery's overly forceful delivery (spitting out "sometimes we fight") reflects a tendency toward inch-deep interpretation".

== Music video ==
The music video was directed by Jim Shea.

== Chart positions ==
Chart (1997–1998)	Peak position
Canada Country Singles (RPM)	6
US Hot Country Songs (Billboard)	4

=== Year-end charts ===
Chart (1998)	Position
US Country Songs (Billboard)	70
