= Pictures (John Michael Montgomery album) =

Studio album by John Michael Montgomery
- Released: October 8, 2002
- Studio: Arrowhead Studios, The Rec Room, Sound Stage Studios and Homemade Studios (Nashville, Tennessee)
- Genre: Country
- Length: 36:49
- Label: Warner Bros. Nashville
- Producer: Scott Hendricks; John Michael Montgomery

John Michael Montgomery chronology
Brand New Me (2000)	Pictures (2002)	The Very Best of John Michael Montgomery (2003)

Singles from Pictures
- 1. "'Til Nothing Comes Between Us" Released: July 15, 2002; 2. "Country Thang" Released: January 27, 2003; 3. "Four-Wheel Drive" Released: May 19, 2003

Professional ratings
Review scores
Source	Rating
AllMusic	3/5 stars

Pictures is the eighth studio album by American country music artist John Michael Montgomery. It was also his first full-length album for Warner Bros. Records, following the closure of Atlantic Records' country division in 2001. The track "'Til Nothing Comes Between Us", the first single, was a top 20 hit on the Hot Country Songs chart in 2002. "Four Wheel Drive" and "Country Thang" were also released as singles, although neither reached the top 40. "It Goes Like This" is a collaboration with the band Sixwire, who at the time were also on Warner Bros. Records. Their lead singer, Steve Mandile, co-wrote the track.

== Background ==
Montgomery said in a Billboard interview, "It took longer to make this album than it had many albums in the past. It's like starting all over again. You have to take your time. It seems like you're taking two steps forward and one step back."

== Track listing ==
Pictures track listing
No.	Title	Writer(s)	Length
1.	"Country Thang"	Lonnie Wilson; Kenny Beard; Jimmy Yeary	3:25
2.	"Love Changes Everything"	Clint Ingersoll; Jeremy Spillman	4:24
3.	"'Til Nothing Comes Between Us"	Rebecca Marshall; Tony Marty; Kerry Harvick	4:43
4.	"Got You to Thank for That"	Byron Hill; Danny Orton	3:35
5.	"Pictures"	Chuck Jones; Steve Seskin	4:05
6.	"Love and Alcohol"	Rivers Rutherford; Don Pfrimmer	3:08
7.	"I Wanna Be There"	Paul Overstreet; Harley Allen	3:31
8.	"Believe in Me"	John Rich; Drew Sessa; Charlie Pennachio	3:39
9.	"It Goes Like This" (featuring Sixwire)	John Bettis; Steve Mandile	3:36
10.	"Four-Wheel Drive"	Kevin Harris	2:36
Total length:			36:49

== Personnel ==
Credits are adapted from the album's linear notes.

Musicians and Vocalists

- John Michael Montgomery – lead vocals
- Gordon Mote – acoustic piano, strings
- Steve Nathan – acoustic piano, Wurlitzer electric piano, synthesizers, Hammond B3 organ
- Kenny Greenberg – electric guitars
- Brent Mason – electric guitars
- Michael Spriggs – acoustic guitars
- Steve Mandile – acoustic guitars, electric guitars (9)
- Paul Franklin – lap steel guitar, steel guitar
- Chad Mullins – banjo guitar (1)
- Mike Brignardello – bass
- Lonnie Wilson – drums, backing vocals (1)
- Eric Darken – percussion
- Billy Davis – backing vocals
- Chip Davis – backing vocals
- John Wesley Ryles – backing vocals
- Curtis Young – backing vocals
- Sixwire – backing vocals (9)

Production and Technical

- John Michael Montgomery – producer
- Scott Hendricks – producer, mixing, additional recording
- Ben Fowler – recording
- Billy Decker – mixing
- Mike Clute – mixing
- John Kunz – additional recording
- Steve Crowder – recording assistant
- Robert Charles – rader assistant
- Mike Hanson – assistant engineer
- Justin McGregor – assistant engineer
- Hank Williams – mastering at MasterMix (Nashville, Tennessee)
- Jason Kruper – production coordinator

Management

- Paige Levy – A&R direction
- Jason Krupek – A&R direction
- Jeff Little – manager (JMM Company)
- Rick Shipp – booking (William Morris Agency)
- Mark Roeder – booking (William Morris Agency)

Artwork

- Maude Gilman-Clapham – art direction
- Don Bailey – design
- Latocki Team Creative – design
- Jim Shea – photography
- Jennifer Kemp – stylist
- Carole Frazier – grooming

== Charts ==
Chart (2001)	Peak position
US Billboard 200	110
US Top Country Albums (Billboard)	13
