= 'Til Nothing Comes Between Us =

Single by John Michael Montgomery

from the album Pictures
- Released: July 27, 2002
- Genre: Country
- Length: 4:43
- Label: Warner Bros. Nashville
- Songwriters: Kerry Harvick, Tony Marty, Rebecca Marshall
- Producers: Scott Hendricks, John Michael Montgomery

John Michael Montgomery singles chronology
"Even Then" (2001)	"'Til Nothing Comes Between Us" (2002)	"Country Thang" (2003)

"'Til Nothing Comes Between Us" is a song written by Kerry Harvick, Tony Marty and Rebecca Marshall, and recorded by American country music artist John Michael Montgomery. It was released in July 2002 as the first single from the album Pictures. The song reached #19 on the Billboard Hot Country Singles & Tracks chart.

== Chart performance ==
Chart (2002)	Peak position
US Hot Country Songs (Billboard)	19
US Bubbling Under Hot 100 (Billboard)	13
