= The Little Girl =

Single by John Michael Montgomery

from the album Brand New Me
- B-side: "Brand New Me"
- Released: August 29, 2000
- Recorded: 2000
- Genre: Country
- Length: 3:53
- Label: Atlantic
- Songwriter: Harley Allen
- Producers: Buddy Cannon; John Michael Montgomery; Norro Wilson

John Michael Montgomery singles chronology
"You Are" (2000)	"The Little Girl" (2000)	"That's What I Like About You" (2001)

"The Little Girl" is a song written by Harley Allen and recorded by American country music artist John Michael Montgomery. The song features harmony vocals by bluegrass musicians Alison Krauss and Dan Tyminski, both members of Alison Krauss and Union Station. It was released in August 2000 as the lead single from the album Brand New Me. The song became Montgomery's seventh and last No. 1 hit to date on the Billboard Hot Country Singles & Tracks chart, and his first chart-topper since 1995's "Sold (The Grundy County Auction Incident)". The song also reached No. 35 on the Billboard Hot 100.

== History ==
Songwriter Harley Allen based the song on a story that had been circulated via e-mail for many years prior, and had been forwarded to him by his brother. According to the story, a young child is raised by parents who are abusive to each other. The daughter witnesses her parents' death via murder-suicide, after which she is taken in by a foster family. After the foster family takes the little girl to church, she sees a picture of Jesus, she remarks that he was "the man who was holding me the night my parents died." Research conducted by Snopes noted that neither their staff nor Allen could discern the original writer of the e-mail story, and declared it to be "a fairly typical example" of uplifting and inspirational stories circulated via e-mail. The website also noted that the anecdote had been frequently mis-attributed as a true story.

== Critical reception ==
Chuck Taylor, of Billboard magazine reviewed the song favorably saying that "every element flows seamlessly together, from the understated production and the tendered melody to Montgomery's carefully measured performance." Kevin John Coyne of Country Universe, in a retrospective, rated the song "F". He criticized the song's story line as "implausible" and "cloying", also writing that "the beyond implicit suggestion that this girl was in danger because her parents were nonbelievers is pretty damn insidious" and criticizing Montgomery's vocal tone.

== Chart positions ==
"The Little Girl" reached number one on the Billboard country chart in late 2000, holding the position for three weeks. It was Montgomery's seventh number-one hit and first since "Sold (The Grundy County Auction Incident)" in 1995. The song also reached number one on the RPM country singles chart in Canada, and was that publication's last country number-one hit as RPM closed in November 2000.

Chart (2000)	Peak position
Canada Country Singles (RPM)	1
US Billboard Hot 100	35
US Hot Country Songs (Billboard)	1

=== Year-end charts ===
Chart (2000)	Position
US Country Songs (Billboard)	44
