= I Miss You a Little =

Single by John Michael Montgomery

from the album What I Do the Best
- Released: February 17, 1997
- Recorded: 1996
- Genre: Country
- Length: 4:12
- Label: Atlantic
- Songwriters: John Michael Montgomery; Richard Fagan; Mike Anthony
- Producer: Czaba Petocz

John Michael Montgomery singles chronology
"Friends" (1996)	"I Miss You a Little" (1997)	"How Was I to Know" (1997)

"I Miss You a Little" is a song co-written and recorded by American country music artist John Michael Montgomery. It was released in February 1997 as the third single from his album What I Do the Best. It peaked at number six in the United States, and number five in Canada. This is the only single to date that Montgomery has had a songwriting credit on. The song was written by Montgomery, Richard Fagan and Mike Anthony.

== Content ==
"I Miss You a Little" is a ballad written in tribute to John Michael Montgomery's father, Harold, who died in 1994. Montgomery included images and audio of his father in the song's corresponding music video. Barbara Montgomery, Harold's widow and executor, filed a lawsuit against the singer after the video's release, claiming that he had not gotten permission from her to use Harold's likeness. By October 1998, a judge in Garrard County, Kentucky, where Barbara lived at the time, ruled in favor of John Michael after determining that Harold was not a public figure and that use of his image was not in violation of any laws regarding likeness rights.

== Critical reception ==
Larry Flick, of Billboard magazine reviewed the song favorably, calling it "a classic-sounding country weeper, dripping in mournful steel guitar." He states that the "heart-tugging lyric is accentuated by Csaba Petocz's skilled production." He goes on to say that Montgomery's tone is "quite vulnerable, and it works well on this heartbreak ballad."

== Music video ==
The music video was directed by Lou Chanatry.

== Chart positions ==
"I Miss You a Little" debuted at number 67 on the U.S. Billboard Hot Country Singles & Tracks for the chart week of March 1, 1997.

Chart (1997)	Peak position
Canada Country Singles (RPM)	5
US Bubbling Under Hot 100 (Billboard)	9
US Hot Country Songs (Billboard)	6
US Country Top 50 (Radio & Records)	1

=== Year-end charts ===
Chart (1997)	Position
Canada Country Tracks (RPM)	79
US Country Songs (Billboard)	44
