= How Was I to Know (John Michael Montgomery song) =

Single by John Michael Montgomery

from the album What I Do the Best
- Released: June 9, 1997
- Recorded: 1996
- Genre: Country
- Length: 4:16
- Label: Atlantic
- Songwriters: Will Rambeaux, Blair Daly
- Producer: Csaba Petocz

John Michael Montgomery singles chronology
"I Miss You a Little" (1997)	"How Was I to Know" (1997)	"Angel in My Eyes" (1997)

"How Was I to Know" is a song written by Will Rambeaux and Blair Daly, and recorded by American country music artist John Michael Montgomery. It was released in June 1997 as the fourth and final single from his album What I Do the Best. It peaked at number 2 in the United States, and number 8 in Canada. Reba McEntire recorded an unrelated song with the same title earlier in the year, which went to number-one.

== Critical reception ==
Chuck Taylor, of Billboard magazine reviewed the song favorably calling it a "less traditional, rather summery feel than many of his previous outings." and that Montgomery's vocals have a "more intimate and conversational quality that's extremely effective on this lilting number."

== Music video ==
Like his previous video "I Miss You a Little", this music video was directed by Lou Chanatry.

== Chart positions ==
Chart (1997)	Peak position
Canada Country Singles (RPM)	8
US Hot Country Songs (Billboard)	2

=== Year-end charts ===
Chart (1997)	Position
Canada Country Tracks (RPM)	81
US Country Songs (Billboard)	32
