= Richard Fagan =

American singer-songwriter (1947–2016)

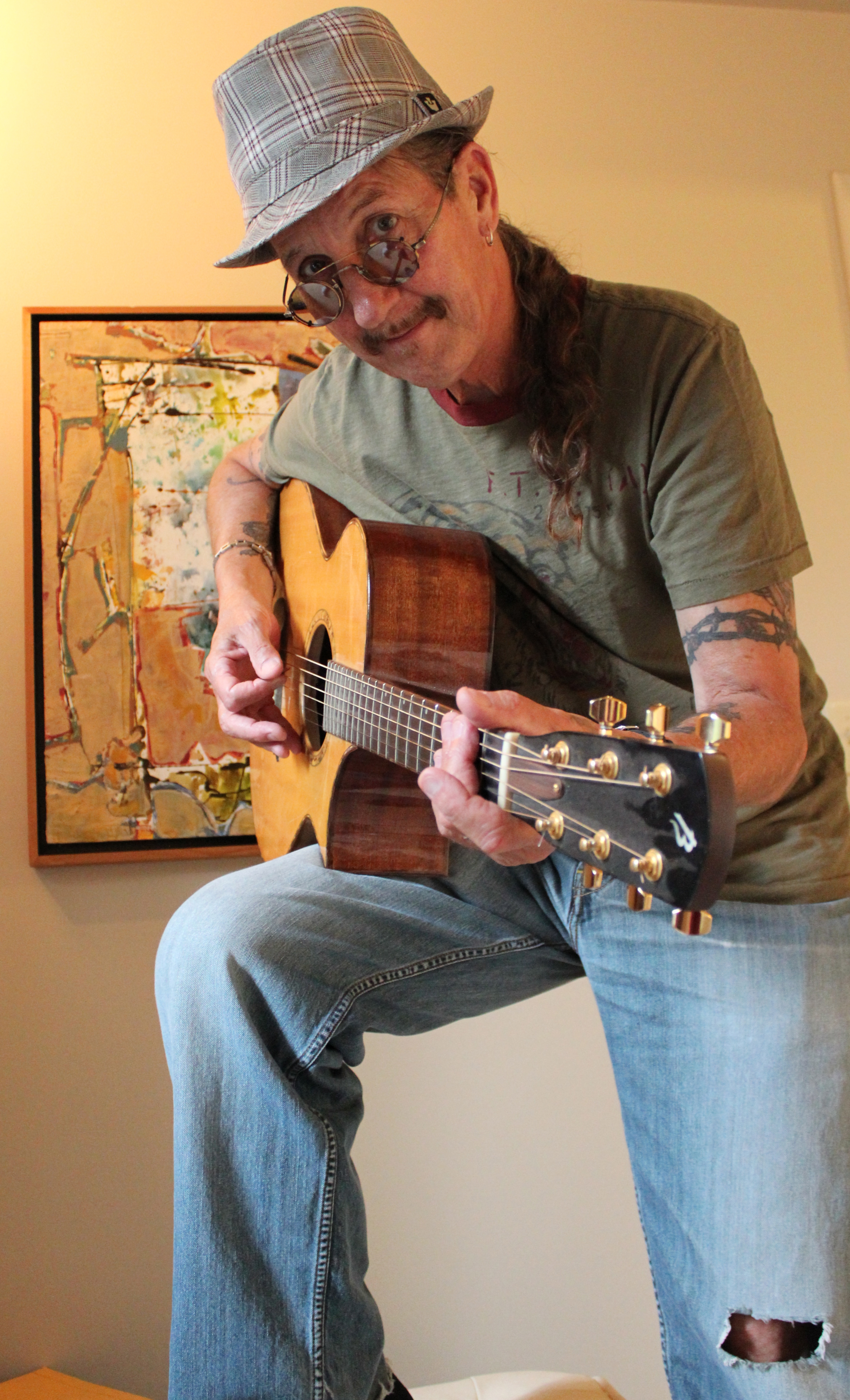
- Richard Fagan poses with Todd Cerney's guitar in front of painting by Gloria Newton

Background information
- Born: Richard William Fagan; April 24, 1947; Philadelphia, Pennsylvania, U.S.
- Died: August 5, 2016 (aged 69) Nashville, Tennessee, U.S.
- Genres: Pop, rock, country
- Occupation: Songwriter
- Instruments: Vocals, guitar, piano
- Years active: 1976–2016
- Label: Mercury Records
- Formerly of: John Michael Montgomery; George Strait; Kacey Jones
- Website: http://broadmindedmusic.com/

Richard Fagan (April 24, 1947 – August 5, 2016) was an American songwriter and musician. He had six top ten singles and 18 charted singles on the Billboard Country charts. Fagan's songs have been recorded by Neil Diamond, George Strait, John Michael Montgomery, Clay Walker, Ricochet, Hank Williams, Jr., George Jones, Shania Twain, Patty Loveless, Collin Raye, Shenandoah, The Crickets, Jason & the Scorchers, The Blues Brothers Band and many others.

In 1979, his song "The Good Lord Loves You" was recorded by Neil Diamond and released on the September Morn album. The song charted in the Billboard Hot 100, peaking at number 67 in April 1980. Fagan accomplished nine Billboard Country chart singles in the 1990s including two of John Michael Montgomery's number one singles: "Be My Baby Tonight" and "Sold (The Grundy County Auction Incident)". Fagan had three additional songs on the Billboard Country charts in the 2000s, including the song "Why Can't We All Just Get a Long Neck?" that appears on the Hank Williams, Jr. album, I'm One of You.

On April 26, 2008, Fagan had a physical altercation with his publishing partner and best friend, Tom Oteri. Fagan was arrested for drunk driving after leaving the scene of the fight where Oteri was later found dead, having suffered a heart attack. Fagan was convicted of the drunk driving charge and sentenced to rehabilitative therapy with the support of Oteri's family members who still regarded Fagan as a close friend after the incident.

== Biography ==
=== Early life and discovery ===
Richard learned basic guitar skills as a young child and began to refine those skills and singing do-wop in Philadelphia as a teenager. According to Richard's account, he encountered two other people singing in the Junior High lunch room, suggested some changes while joining along and immediately had new friends and singing companions. After being drafted into the Army and serving a year in Vietnam, Fagan returned to Philadelphia where, for a while, he was homeless. He married and had a son, but divorced in 1975. Tom Oteri discovered Fagan's songwriting talents and invited him to a recording studio audition. In 1976 Oteri recorded five of Fagan's songs and sent them to various producers but because the recordings did not identify an address or phone number they never received any response. Bob Gaudio, Neil Diamond's producer, heard one of the songs and hired an ex-FBI agent as a private detective to find the song's author.

=== Initial success and Mercury Records ===
In 1978 Bob Gaudio acquired Fagan's song, "The Good Lord Loves You." The song finally appeared three years later on Diamond's "September Morn" album. Gaudio also managed to get Fagan signed with Mercury Records and produced his first album. Fagan relocated to Los Angeles, learned to play piano and recorded the tracks for his first album, "Richard Fagan" which was released the last week of 1979 just about the same time that "September Morn" was released. Fagan's album received critical acclaim and he recorded the tracks for a second album, "Jiver", but Mercury never released it.

=== Nashville and country music ===
Fagan's initial success was not achieved again until he relocated from Los Angeles to Nashville, Tennessee in January 1986. Within a week of his relocation, he had one of his songs, "Blue Suede Blues", recorded by Con Hunley. The song reached number 49 on the Billboard Country charts in 1986. That same first week in Nashville Fagan had another song accepted – "Americana" – by Moe Bandy, which was released in 1988. In March it reached number 8 on the Billboard Country charts. and was quickly adopted by George H. W. Bush as a theme song for his Presidential Campaign.

Fagan's songs have appeared on the soundtracks of five Hollywood feature films. He has written a network television theme song, a Presidential campaign song, a national sports anthem, show tunes, gospel songs, comic numbers and a Billboard Country Single of the Year. Working with a variety of collaborators, he has been responsible for such unforgettable hits as "Sold," "Only on Days That End in Y," "I Miss You a Little," "Overnight Male" and "Be My Baby Tonight." Albums containing Fagan songs have sold more than 25 million copies. "God has always given me a pot of gold," says Richard Fagan. "I think there's a reason for it all. And I guess my being naïve helped me to succeed in Nashville. I didn't know it at the time, but my timing was great."

=== Death of Tom Oteri ===
"Their relationship was more like father and son than anything," said Fagan's friend and frequent co-writer Kacey Jones. "Tom rescued Rich from a life situation that would have gone nowhere but bad. He dusted him off and said, 'Your job is to write songs. I'll make sure you have a roof over your head and food and all the things you need to live, and you'll write songs.' "

That arrangement detonated on April 26, 2008, when an argument led to a brawl. Fagan says it was the only time they had ever had a physical fight. Fagan was full of Patrón and antidepressants, Oteri high and low on the painkiller fentanyl, which had been prescribed after he broke a rib. Wounded by Fagan's knife, Oteri yelled at his friend to leave, perhaps out of anger and perhaps for protection. Fagan drove off, drunk, and was arrested for driving under the influence of alcohol. He spent the night in jail, and was on his way home on bail, hoping to make apologies and amends with Oteri, when he was called back to the Harding precinct.

"The detective said, 'Your friend's dead. Murder one,' " Fagan recalled. "My best friend of 32 years. The next day, Tom's son and his daughter and sister came to visit. They said I was crying my eyes out, saying, 'It should have been me.' I did wish I was dead. But I wasn't dead, so what do I do?"

The answer came back from Tom Oteri Jr.: You'll write songs.

"My dad believed in Rich's music," said Oteri Jr., who is now publishing Fagan's songs through his Broadminded Music company. "I can't let all the work they did go to waste. I grew up around Rich, and I've known him all my life, and I know that what happened was an accident. I have to let Rich keep going. It's what my dad would want."

== Death ==
Fagan died on August 5, 2016, in Nashville of liver cancer at the age of 69.

== Chart singles written by Fagan ==
The following is a list of Richard Fagan compositions that were chart hits.

Year	Single Title	Recording Artist	Chart Positions		
Year	Single Title	Recording Artist	Billboard Hot 100	Billboard AC	Billboard Country
1980	The Good Lord Loves You	Neil Diamond	67	23	
1986	Blue Suede Blues co-written with Patti Ryan and Mickey James	Con Hunley			49
1988	Americana	Moe Bandy			8
1988	Henrietta	Mel McDaniel			62
1988	Real Good Feel Good Song co-written with Larry Alderman	Mel McDaniel			9
1989	'Blue Suede Blues co-written with Patti Ryan and Mickey James	Mel McDaniel			70
1989	You Can't Play the Blues (In an Air-Conditioned Room) co-written with Gordon Kennedy	Mel McDaniel			80
1991	Light at the End of the Tunnel co-written with Kim Williams and Mack Williams	B. B. Watson			23
1992	Lover Not a Fighter co-written with Kim Williams and Kent Blazy	B. B. Watson			43
1992	Overnight Male co-written with Kim Williams and Ron Harbin	George Strait			70
1994	Be My Baby Tonight co-written with Ed Hill	John Michael Montgomery	73		1
1994	Good Girls Go to Heaven co-written with Kim Williams	Charlie Floyd			58
1995	Sold (The Grundy County Auction Incident) co-written with Robb Royer	John Michael Montgomery			1
1996	All Over But the Shouting co-written with Michael Smotherman	Shenandoah			43
1996	Only on Days That End in "Y"	Clay Walker			5
1997	I Miss You a Little co-written with John Michael Montgomery and Mike Anthony	John Michael Montgomery	109		6
2000	Do I Love You Enough co-written with Lisa Palas	Ricochet			45
2001	That's What I Like About You co-written with Larry Alderman	John Michael Montgomery			44
2004	Why Can't We All Just Get a Longneck? co-written with Michael Smotherman and Chris Clark	Hank Williams, Jr.			36
