= Sold (The Grundy County Auction Incident) =

Single by John Michael Montgomery

from the album John Michael Montgomery
- Released: May 1, 1995
- Recorded: Sound Emporium (Nashville, Tennessee)
- Genre: Country
- Length: 2:32
- Label: Atlantic
- Songwriters: Robb Royer; Richard Fagan
- Producer: Scott Hendricks

John Michael Montgomery singles chronology
"I Can Love You Like That" (1995)	"Sold (The Grundy County Auction Incident)" (1995)	"No Man's Land" (1995)

"Sold (The Grundy County Auction Incident)" is a song written by Richard Fagan and Robb Royer, and recorded by American country music artist John Michael Montgomery. It was released in May 1995 as the second single from his self-titled album. It hit number-one on the country charts in the United States and Canada in July 1995. It was named Billboard Hot Country Singles & Tracks' number-one single for 1995.

== Content ==
"Sold" is delivered at a fast tempo, using the framework of an auction at a county fair. The narrator metaphorically auctions off his heart to a female at the fair whom he finds attractive.

== Critical reception ==
Deborah Evans Price, of Billboard magazine reviewed the song favorably, saying that it demonstrates Montgomery's "ability to deliver tongue-twisting lyrics in rapid fire fashion."

== Personnel ==
Per liner notes.

- John Michael Montgomery – lead vocals
- Paul Franklin – steel guitar
- Rob Hajacos – fiddle
- John Barlow Jarvis – piano
- Brent Mason – electric guitar
- Terry McMillan – harmonica
- John Wesley Ryles – backing vocals
- Billy Joe Walker Jr. – acoustic guitar
- Glenn Worf – bass guitar
- Dennis Wilson – backing vocals
- Lonnie Wilson – drums

== Chart performance ==
Chart (1995)	Peak position
Canada Country Singles (RPM)	1
US Hot Country Songs (Billboard)	1

Chart (2022)	Peak position
Canada Digital Song Sales (Billboard)	48

=== Year-end charts ===
Chart (1995)	Position
Canada Country Tracks (RPM)	61
US Country Songs (Billboard)	1

== Other Recordings ==
- American country music parody artist Cledus T. Judd released two parodies of "Sold (The Grundy County Auction Incident)" titled "Skoal: The Grundy County Spitting Incident" and "Stoled: The Copyright Infringement Incident" on his 1996 album I Stoled This Record.
- Barbershop quartet OC Times released an Aaron Dale arrangement of the song on their 2007 CD Let's Fly
