= Friends (John Michael Montgomery song) =

Single by John Michael Montgomery

from the album What I Do the Best
- Released: September 23, 1996
- Recorded: 1996
- Genre: Country
- Length: 3:52
- Label: Atlantic
- Songwriter: Jerry Holland
- Producer: Csaba Petocz

John Michael Montgomery singles chronology
"Ain't Got Nothin' on Us" (1996)	"Friends" (1996)	"I Miss You a Little" (1997)

"Friends" is a song written by Jerry Holland, and recorded by American country music artist John Michael Montgomery. It was released in September 1996 as the second single from his album What I Do the Best. It peaked at number 2 in the United States, while it was a number-one hit in Canada.

== Content ==
The song is a ballad, that discusses how when people break up, they always state the line "we can still be friends."

== Critical reception ==
Deborah Evans Price, of Billboard magazine reviewed the song favorably saying that "Montgomery's performance is solid, and the song is incredibly poignant."

== Chart positions ==
Chart (1996–1997)	Peak position
Canada Country Singles (RPM)	1
US Billboard Hot 100	69
US Hot Country Songs (Billboard)	2

=== Year-end charts ===
Chart (1997)	Position
Canada Country Tracks (RPM)	38
US Country Songs (Billboard)	59
