= Paul Brandt discography =

- Studio albums: 7
- Extended plays: 3
- Live albums: 1
- Compilation albums: 1
- Singles: 42
- Music videos: 34
- Christmas albums: 2

Canadian country music singer Paul Brandt has released seven studio albums, two holiday albums, three extended plays, and 42 singles. Brandt debuted in 1996 with the single "My Heart Has a History", the first of five consecutive number ones in his native Canada. Both this and his next single, "I Do", made top 10 on the U.S. country charts. Although he charted only three more top 40 hits in the United States, he has continued to chart in Canada, including the number one all-genre hit "Canadian Man" in 2001 and the Gold-certified "I'm an Open Road" in 2015.

== Studio albums ==
=== 1990s ===
Title	Album details	Peak chart positions				Certifications (sales threshold)
Title	Album details	CAN Country	CAN	US Country	US	Certifications (sales threshold)
Calm Before the Storm	Release date: June 11, 1996; Label: Reprise Records; Formats: CD, cassette	1	55	14	102	MC: 3× Platinum; RIAA: Gold
Outside the Frame	Release date: November 11, 1997; Label: Reprise Records; Formats: CD, cassette	1	39	50	—	MC: Platinum
That's the Truth	Release date: July 13, 1999; Label: Reprise Records; Formats: CD, cassette	1	20	56	—	MC: Gold
"—" denotes releases that did not chart

=== 2000s ===
Title	Album details	Peak positions	Certifications (sales threshold)
Title	Album details	CAN	Certifications (sales threshold)
This Time Around	Release date: August 3, 2004; Label: Orange/Brand-T; Formats: CD, music download	—	MC: Platinum
Risk	Release date: September 11, 2007; Label: Brand-T/Universal Music; Formats: CD, music download	4	MC: Gold
"—" denotes releases that did not chart

=== 2010s ===
Title	Album details	Peak positions
Title	Album details	CAN
Give It Away	Release date: September 13, 2011; Label: Brand-T/Universal Music; Formats: CD, music download	13
Just as I Am	Release date: October 16, 2012; Label: Brand-T/Universal Music; Formats: CD, Music download	—
"—" denotes releases that did not chart

== Holiday albums ==
Title	Album details	Peak positions
Title	Album details	CAN Country
A Paul Brandt Christmas: Shall I Play for You?	Release date: November 17, 1998; Label: Reprise Records; Formats: CD, cassette	27
A Gift	Release date: November 7, 2006; Label: Orange/Brand-T; Formats: CD, music download	—
"—" denotes releases that did not chart

== Compilation albums ==
Title	Album details
What I Want to Be Remembered For	Release date: November 14, 2000; Label: Warner Music Canada; Formats: CD, cassette

== Extended plays ==
Title	Album details	Peak positions
Title	Album details	CAN
Borderlines	Release date: November 27, 2015; Label: Brand-T; Format: Digital	—
The Journey YYC, Vol. 1	Release date: April 6, 2018; Label: Brand-T / Warner Music; Format: Digital	58
The Journey BNA, Vol. 2	Release date: November 9, 2018; Label: Brand-T / Warner Music; Format: Digital	8
"—" denotes releases that did not chart

== Box sets ==
Title	Album details
Now	Release date: September 13, 2011; Label: Brand-T/Universal Music; Formats: CD

== Live albums ==
Title	Album details
Small Towns and Big Dreams	Release date: November 6, 2001; Label: Brand-T/BMG; Formats: CD

== Singles ==
=== 1990s ===
Year	Single	Peak chart positions		Album
Year	Single	CAN Country	US Country	Album
1996	"My Heart Has a History"	1	5	Calm Before the Storm
1996	"I Do" (Note: "I Do" also peaked at number 2 on the Billboard Bubbling Under Hot 100 Singles chart, which ranks the top 25 songs that have not yet reached the Billboard Hot 100.)	1	2	Calm Before the Storm
1996	"I Meant to Do That"	1	39	Calm Before the Storm
1997	"Take It from Me"	1	38	Calm Before the Storm
1997	"A Little in Love"	1	45	Outside the Frame
1997	"What's Come Over You"	10	68	Outside the Frame
1998	"Yeah!"	5	—	Outside the Frame
1998	"Outside the Frame"	3	—	Outside the Frame
1999	"That's the Truth"	1	47	That's the Truth
1999	"It's a Beautiful Thing"	13	38	That's the Truth
"—" denotes releases that did not chart

=== 2000s ===
Year	Single	Peak chart positions		Album
Year	Single	CAN Country	CAN (Note: Chart positions come from the Canadian Singles Chart from 2000-2007 and the Canadian Hot 100 from 2007 to the present.)	Album
2000	"That Hurts" (Note: "That Hurts" peaked at number 68 on the Billboard Hot Country Songs chart (then named Hot Country Singles & Tracks).)	—	—	That's the Truth
2000	"The Sycamore Tree"	7	—	That's the Truth
2000	"What I Want to Be Remembered For" (Note: "What I Want to Be Remembered For" reached number 50 on the Canadian RPM Country Singles chart when RPM ceased publication.)	50	—	What I Want to Be Remembered For
2001	"There's Nothing I Wouldn't Do"	*	—	What I Want to Be Remembered For
2001	"Canadian Man"	*	1	Small Towns and Big Dreams
2002	"Small Towns and Big Dreams"	*	—	Small Towns and Big Dreams
2002	"I'm Gonna Fly"	*	—	Small Towns and Big Dreams
2002	"When You Call My Name"	*	—	Small Towns and Big Dreams
2003	"Take It Off"	*	—	Small Towns and Big Dreams
2003	"Hope"	*	—	—N/a
2004	"Leavin'"	4	—	This Time Around
2004	"Convoy"	9	—	This Time Around
2004	"Home"	6	—	This Time Around
2005	"Rich Man"	10	—	This Time Around
2005	"Alberta Bound"	4	—	This Time Around
2007	"Didn't Even See the Dust"	3	31	Risk
2007	"Come On and Get Some"	5	74	Risk
2008	"That's Worth Fightin' For"	10	79	Risk
2008	"Risk"	9	76	Risk
2008	"Virtual Life"	9	79	Risk
"—" denotes releases that did not chart "*" denotes releases where no chart existed

=== 2010s ===
Year	Single	Peak chart positions		Certifications (sales threshold)	Album
Year	Single	CAN Country	CAN	Certifications (sales threshold)	Album
2010	"The Highway Patrol"	20	—		Give It Away
2011	"Give It Away"	8	76		Give It Away
2011	"Together Again"	10	—		Give It Away
2012	"You"	48	—		Give It Away
2012	"Now"	24	—		Give It Away
2014	"Forever Summer"	10	82		Borderlines (EP)
2014	"Get a Bed"	9	83		Borderlines (EP)
2015	"Nothing"	17	—		Borderlines (EP)
2015	"I'm an Open Road" (featuring Jess Moskaluke)	7	93	MC: Gold	Borderlines (EP)
2017	"The Journey"	16	— (Note: "The Journey" did not enter the Canadian Hot 100, but peaked at number 45 on the Hot Canadian Digital Song Sales chart.)		The Journey YYC, Vol. 1
2018	"All About Her"	9	—		The Journey YYC, Vol. 1
2018	"Bittersweet" (featuring Lindsay Ell)	16	—		The Journey BNA: Vol. 2
"—" denotes releases that did not chart

== Other charted songs ==
Year	Single	Peak chart positions			Album
Year	Single	CAN Country	CAN	US Country	Album
1999	"Six Tons of Toys"	—	—	66	Shall I Play for You?
2006	"A Gift"	37	—	—	A Gift
2006	"Christmas Convoy"	28	—	—	A Gift
2011	"I Was There"	44	87	—	—N/a
"—" denotes releases that did not chart

== Music videos ==
Year	Video	Director
1996	"My Heart Has a History"	Thom Oliphant
1996	"I Do"	Thom Oliphant
1996	"I Meant to Do That"	Steven Goldmann
1997	"A Little in Love"	Tim Hamilton
1997	"What's Come Over You"	Jeffrey C. Phillips
1998	"Yeah!"	
1999	"That's the Truth"	Thom Oliphant
2000	"What I Want to Be Remembered For"	Pablo Fairhall
2001	"Canadian Man"	Joel Stewart
2002	"Small Towns and Big Dreams"	Joel Stewart
2004	"Leavin'"	Joel Stewart
2004	"Convoy"	Joel Stewart
2004	"Hands" (w/ Liz Brandt)	
2004	"Home"	Joel Stewart
2005	"Alberta Bound"	Joel Stewart
2006	"The Gift"	
2007	"Didn't Even See the Dust"	Joel Stewart
2007	"Come On and Get Some"	Joel Stewart
2008	"Risk"	
2010	"The Highway Patrol"	
2011	"Give It Away"	Joel Stewart
2011	"I Was There"	Ryan Jackson
2012	"You"	Joel Stewart
2012	"Now"	
2013	"I'll Fly Away" (with John Anderson)	Joel Stewart
2013	"Just as I Am"	Joel Stewart
2013	"Flee as a Bird"	Joel Stewart
2014	"Forever Summer"	Chuck David Willis
2014	"Get a Bed" (with Fresh I.E.)	
2015	"Nothing"	
2015	"I'm an Open Road" (with Jess Moskaluke)	Sam Ciurdar
2017	"The Journey"	Phil Leclerc
2018	"All About Her"	Joel Stewart
2018	Bittersweet" (with Lindsay Ell)	Kat Webber
