= Lists of number-one albums =

The following articles contain lists of number-one albums:

- List of number-one albums in Argentina
- List of number-one albums in Australia
- List of number-one albums (Finland)
- List of number-one albums of 2016 (Greece)
- Lists of Irish Albums Chart number ones
- List of Oricon number-one albums
- List of number-one albums in Norway
- Lists of UK Albums Chart number ones
- Lists of Billboard 200 number-one albums

== Other ==
- Lists of Billboard number-one country albums
- List of number-one country albums (Canada)
- 1978
- 1979
- 1980
- 1984
- 1989
- 1992
- 1993
- 1994
- 1995
- 1996
- 1997
- 1998
- 1999
- 2000

== See also ==
- Lists of number-one songs
