= List of number-one country albums (Canada) =

Music album that has topped the country music album chart of Canada

This is a list of number-one country albums in Canada by year from the RPM Country Albums chart.

== 1970s ==
- 1978
- 1979

== 1980s ==
- 1980
- 1981
- 1984
- 1989

== 1990s ==
- 1992
- 1993
- 1994
- 1995
- 1996
- 1997
- 1998
- 1999

== 2000s ==
- 2000
