= What I Want to Be Remembered For =

Greatest hits album by Paul Brandt
- Released: November 14, 2000
- Genre: Country
- Label: Warner Music Canada
- Producer: Various

Paul Brandt chronology
| That's the Truth (1999) | What I Want to Be Remembered For (2000) | Small Towns and Big Dreams (2001) |

What I Want to Be Remembered For is the first greatest hits album by Canadian country music singer Paul Brandt. The album features ten singles from Brandt's first three studio albums and two newly recorded songs — "What I Want to Be Remembered For" and "There's Nothing I Wouldn't Do" — which were both released as singles.

== Track listing ==
1. "My Heart Has a History" (Mark D. Sanders, Paul Brandt)
2. "It's a Beautiful Thing" (Jeffrey Steele, Craig Wiseman)
3. "I Do" (Brandt)
4. "That's the Truth" (Brandt, Chris Farren)
5. "I Meant to Do That" (Lynn Gillespie Chater, Kerry Chater, Brandt)
6. "Take It from Me" (Roy Hurd, Brandt)
7. "Yeah!" (Brandt, Steve Rosen)
8. "A Little in Love" (Josh Leo, Rick Bowles)
9. "The Sycamore Tree" (Brandt, Rosen)
10. "Outside the Frame" (Brandt, Rosen)
11. "There's Nothing I Wouldn't Do" (Brandt)
12. "What I Want to Be Remembered For" (Brandt, Jon Vezner)

== Year-end charts ==
| Chart (2001) | Position |
|---|---|
| Canadian Country Albums (Nielsen SoundScan) | 47 |
