= List of places of worship in Calgary =

There are many places of worship in Calgary.

== List ==
- Downtown Calgary Mosque
- Islamic Centre of South Calgary
- Green Dome Mosque
- Abu Bakr Islamic Centre
- Maryam Masjid
- MAC | Al-Salam Centre
- Bilal Islamic Centre
- Bait-ul Mukarram Islamic Centre Calgary
- Osmania Masjid and Musallah
- Al-Hedaya Islamic Centre
- Faizan-e Madina Islamic Centre
- Islamic Information Society of Calgary (IISC)
- Akram Jomma Masjid
- South West Masjid
- Shia Muslim Association of Calgary (Imambargah)
- Anjuman E Vajihi- Dawoodi Bohra Community Hall
- Baitun Nur, a mosque of the Ahmadiyya Muslim Community in the Castleridge community
- BAPS Shri Swaminarayan Mandir, Calgary
- Calgary Alberta Temple, a temple of the Church of Jesus Christ of Latter-day Saints, dedicated October 28, 2012
- Cathedral Church of the Redeemer, the seat of the Anglican Diocese of Calgary
- Centre Street Church, a member church of the Evangelical Missionary Church of Canada (EMCC) and largest megachurch in Canada
- Knox United Church, a member church of the United Church of Canada
- St. Mary's Cathedral, a Roman Catholic cathedral
- St. Patrick's Roman Catholic Church, a historic Carpenter Gothic-style Roman Catholic church
- Canadian Reformed Church at Calgary
- Calgary Srithevi Karumari Amman Hindu Temple, North East Calgary
- Sri Murugan Hindu Temple, North East Calgary
- Sri Anagha Datta Society of Calgary
- Dashmesh Culture Centre
