= That's the Truth =

That's the Truth may refer to:

- That's the Truth (album), an album by Paul Brandt
  - "That's the Truth" (Paul Brandt song), the title track from the above album
- "That's the Truth" (McFly song), 2010
- That's the Truth (Johnny Cash song), 1984
