= Just as I Am =

Just as I Am may refer to:

== Literature ==
- Just as I Am: The Autobiography of Billy Graham, a 1997 book by Billy Graham
- Just as I Am, a 2021 book by Cicely Tyson

== Music ==
- Just as I Am (Bill Withers album), 1971
- Just as I Am (Brantley Gilbert album), 2014
- Just as I Am (Guy Sebastian album), 2003
- Just as I Am (Paul Brandt album), 2012
- Just as I Am (Yolanda Adams album), 1987
- Just as I Am, an album by Andy Griffith, 1999
- Just as I Am, an album by Dee Harvey, 1991
- "Just as I Am" (hymn), an 1835 hymn by Charlotte Elliott
- "Just as I Am" (Ricky Van Shelton song), 1993
- "Just as I Am" (Rob Hegel song), 1982, covered by Air Supply
- "Just as I Am", a song by Debelah Morgan from the album Light at the End of the Tunnel, 2005
- "Just as I Am", a song by Dee Harvey, 1992
