= All About Her =

All About Her may refer to:

- "All About Her" a 2001 song by Cheb Khaled / Chaba Zahouania
- "All About Her" a 2000 song by New Found Glory from New Found Glory
- "All About Her", a 2018 song by Paul Brandt from The Journey YYC, Vol. 1
- "All About Her" a 1966 song by Paul Revere & the Raiders from The Spirit of '67
