= Give It Away (Paul Brandt album) =

Studio album by Paul Brandt
- Released: September 13, 2011
- Genre: Country
- Length: 45:07
- Label: Brand-T Records
- Producer: Paul Brandt, Steve Rosen

Paul Brandt chronology
Risk (2007)	Give It Away (2011)	Just As I Am (2012)

Singles from Give It Away
- 1. "The Highway Patrol" Released: September 13, 2010; 2. "Give It Away" Released: May 30, 2011; 3. "Together Again" Released: October 10, 2011; 4. "You" Released: February 6, 2012; 5. "Now" Released: July 9, 2012

Professional ratings
Review scores
Source	Rating
Calgary Herald	3/5 stars

Give It Away is the sixth studio album by Canadian country music artist Paul Brandt. It was released on September 13, 2011 on Brandt's record label, Brand-T Records. The album includes reworked versions of two of Brandt's earlier singles, "My Heart Has a History" and "I Do," as well as a cover of Red Simpson's "The Highway Patrol."

On December 8, 2011, it was announced that Give It Away was named the iTunes Rewind Canadian Country Album of the Year.

== Track listing ==
No.	Title	Writer(s)	Length
1.	"Give It Away"	Paul Brandt	4:56
2.	"Now"	Brandt, Steve Rosen	4:43
3.	"Together Again"	Brandt, Brad Rempel	3:35
4.	"Worth"	Brandt, Rosen	4:02
5.	"You"	Brandt	4:57
6.	"Start with Love"	Brandt	4:31
7.	"I Do" (revisited)	Brandt	4:58
8.	"Last First Kiss"	Brandt	4:19
9.	"My Heart Has a History" (revisited)	Brandt, Mark D. Sanders	4:37
10.	"The Highway Patrol"	Red Simpson, Dennis Payne, Ray Rush	4:29

== Chart performance ==
=== Album ===
Chart (2011)	Peak position
Canadian Albums Chart	13

=== Singles ===
Year	Single	Peak positions
Year	Single	CAN
2010	"The Highway Patrol"	—
2011	"Give It Away"	76
2011	"Together Again"	—
2012	"You"	—
2012	"Now"	—
"—" denotes releases that did not chart
