= List of number-one country albums of 1997 (Canada) =

Best country music albums in Canada

These are the Canadian number-one country albums of 1997 per RPM and SoundScan.

== RPM ==
Issue date	Album	Artist
January 13	Everything I Love	Alan Jackson
January 20	The Woman in Me	Shania Twain
January 27	Calm Before the Storm	Paul Brandt
February 3	Did I Shave My Legs for This?	Deana Carter
February 10	Blue	LeAnn Rimes
February 17	Blue	LeAnn Rimes
February 24	Did I Shave My Legs for This?	Deana Carter
March 3	Blue	LeAnn Rimes
March 10	Did I Shave My Legs for This?	Deana Carter
March 17	Unchained Melody: The Early Years	LeAnn Rimes
March 24	Unchained Melody: The Early Years	LeAnn Rimes
March 31	Did I Shave My Legs for This?	Deana Carter
April 7	Did I Shave My Legs for This?	Deana Carter
April 14	Unchained Melody: The Early Years	LeAnn Rimes
April 21	Did I Shave My Legs for This?	Deana Carter
April 28	Did I Shave My Legs for This?	Deana Carter
May 5	Did I Shave My Legs for This?	Deana Carter
May 12	Carrying Your Love with Me	George Strait
May 19	Carrying Your Love with Me	George Strait
May 26	Carrying Your Love with Me	George Strait
June 2	Carrying Your Love with Me	George Strait
June 9	Blue	LeAnn Rimes
June 16	Blue	LeAnn Rimes
June 23	Everywhere	Tim McGraw
June 30	Butterfly Kisses (Shades of Grace)	Bob Carlisle
July 7	Butterfly Kisses (Shades of Grace)	Bob Carlisle
July 14	New Country 4	Various Artists
July 21	Leahy	Leahy
July 28	Leahy	Leahy
August 4	Leahy	Leahy
August 11	Tremolo	Blue Rodeo
August 18	Everywhere	Tim McGraw
August 25	Butterfly Kisses (Shades of Grace)	Bob Carlisle
September 1	Everywhere	Tim McGraw
September 8	Leahy	Leahy
September 15	Leahy	Leahy
September 22	(Songbook) A Collection of Hits	Trisha Yearwood
September 29	(Songbook) A Collection of Hits	Trisha Yearwood
October 6	(Songbook) A Collection of Hits	Trisha Yearwood
October 13	You Light up My Life: Inspirational Songs	LeAnn Rimes
October 20	You Light up My Life: Inspirational Songs	LeAnn Rimes
October 27	The Greatest Hits Collection	Brooks & Dunn
November 3	Outside the Frame	Paul Brandt
November 10	Outside the Frame	Paul Brandt
November 17	Come on Over	Shania Twain
November 24	Come on Over	Shania Twain
December 1	Come on Over	Shania Twain
December 8	Sevens	Garth Brooks
December 15	Sevens	Garth Brooks

== SoundScan ==
Week ended	Album	Artist	Ref
November 2, 1997	(Songbook) A Collection of Hits	Trisha Yearwood	
November 9, 1997	Come On Over	Shania Twain	
November 16, 1997	Come On Over	Shania Twain	
November 23, 1997	Come On Over	Shania Twain	
November 30, 1997	Sevens	Garth Brooks	
December 7, 1997	Sevens	Garth Brooks	
December 14, 1997	Come On Over	Shania Twain	
