= Alberta Bound =

Alberta Bound may refer to:

- "Alberta Bound", a song from Gordon Lightfoot's 1972 album Don Quixote
- "Alberta Bound" (Paul Brandt song), from the 2004 album This Time Around
- "Alberta Bound", a 2011 single by Bryan Adams
