= Hold On Abraham! =

"Hold on Abraham"
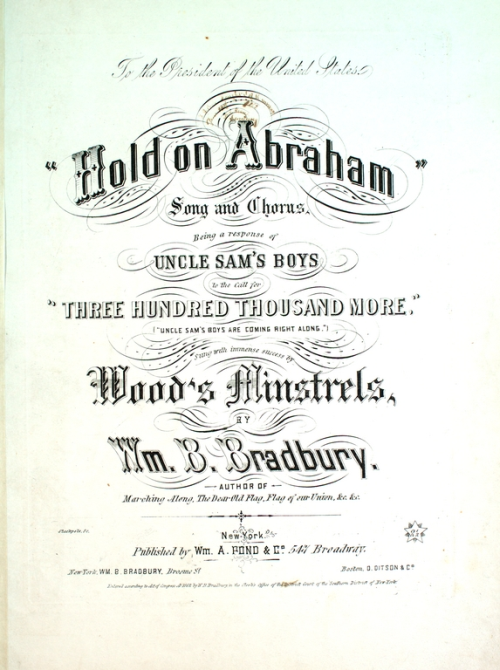
- Sheet music cover, 1862

Song
- Published: 1862
- Songwriter(s): William B. Bradbury

"Hold on Abraham!" is a popular song dating from 1862, during the time of the American Civil War. The song is fast-paced and repetitive, and, at the time of its popularity, was often performed by minstrels. The words and lyrics were composed by William Batchelder Bradbury.

The song was supposedly written as a response to president Abraham Lincoln's request of three hundred thousand more Union soldiers. The lyrics of the song contain references to such Civil War Generals as Henry Wager Halleck, George B. McClellan, Michael Corcoran, and others. The first verse and chorus are:

We’re going down to Dixie, to Dixie, to Dixie,
We’re going down to Dixie, to fight for the dear old Flag;
And should we fall in Dixie, in Dixie, in Dixie,
And should we fall in Dixie, we’ll die for the dear old Flag.

Hold on Abraham,
Never say die to your Uncle Sam;
Uncle Sam’s boys are coming right along,
Six hundred thousand strong.

== Bibliography ==
- Bradbury, William B. "Hold on Abraham" (Sheet music). New York: Wm. A. Pond & Co. (1862).
