= Rocky Mountain College (Calgary) =

Christian college in Calgary, Alberta, Canada

Location
- 4039 Brentwood Road NW; Calgary, Alberta; Canada; 51.0887°N 114.1330°W

Information
- Denomination: Evangelical Missionary Church
- Established: 1992
- President: Mr. Kerry Belt
- Accreditation: ABHE

Rocky Mountain College is a multi-denominational Christian college in Calgary, Alberta. It was formed in 1992 when Mountain View Bible College (Didsbury, Alberta) merged with Hillcrest Christian College (Medicine Hat, Alberta) and was sponsored by the Canada West District of the Evangelical Missionary Church of Canada.

It offers one-year certificate programs, two-year diploma programs, and three and four-year Bachelor of Arts degrees
