= List of number-one country albums of 1996 (Canada) =

Best country music albums in Canada

These are the Canadian number-one country albums of 1996, per the RPM Country Albums chart.

Issue date	Album	Artist
January 8	The Woman in Me	Shania Twain
January 15	The Woman in Me	Shania Twain
January 22	The Woman in Me	Shania Twain
January 29	The Woman in Me	Shania Twain
February 5	The Woman in Me	Shania Twain
February 12	The Woman in Me	Shania Twain
February 19	The Woman in Me	Shania Twain
February 26	The Woman in Me	Shania Twain
March 4	Revelations	Wynonna
March 11	Revelations	Wynonna
March 18	The Woman in Me	Shania Twain
March 25	The Woman in Me	Shania Twain
April 1	Fresh Horses	Garth Brooks
April 8	Fresh Horses	Garth Brooks
April 15	The Woman in Me	Shania Twain
April 22	The Woman in Me	Shania Twain
April 29	The Woman in Me	Shania Twain
May 6	The Woman in Me	Shania Twain
May 13	Borderline	Brooks & Dunn
May 20	The Woman in Me	Shania Twain
May 27	The Woman in Me	Shania Twain
June 3	The Woman in Me	Shania Twain
June 10	Borderline	Brooks & Dunn
June 17	The Woman in Me	Shania Twain
June 24	The Woman in Me	Shania Twain
July 1	Calm Before the Storm	Paul Brandt
July 8	The Greatest Hits Collection	Alan Jackson
July 15	The Greatest Hits Collection	Alan Jackson
July 22	The Woman in Me	Shania Twain
July 29	The Woman in Me	Shania Twain
August 5	Blue	LeAnn Rimes
August 12	The Woman in Me	Shania Twain
August 19	Calm Before the Storm	Paul Brandt
August 26	Calm Before the Storm	Paul Brandt
September 2	The Woman in Me	Shania Twain
September 9	Calm Before the Storm	Paul Brandt
September 16	The Woman in Me	Shania Twain
September 23	The Woman in Me	Shania Twain
September 30	Calm Before the Storm	Paul Brandt
October 7	Calm Before the Storm	Paul Brandt
October 14	CMT Canada '96	Various Artists
October 21	CMT Canada '96	Various Artists
October 28	Ten Thousand Angels	Mindy McCready
November 4	Blue	LeAnn Rimes
November 11	The Woman in Me	Shania Twain
November 18	Collection	The Rankin Family
November 25	The Woman in Me	Shania Twain
December 2	The Woman in Me	Shania Twain
December 9	The Woman in Me	Shania Twain
December 16	The Woman in Me	Shania Twain
