= Baitun Nur Mosque =

Islamic mosque in Calgary, Alberta, Canada

Baitun Nur mosque
- Urdu: مسجد بیت النور
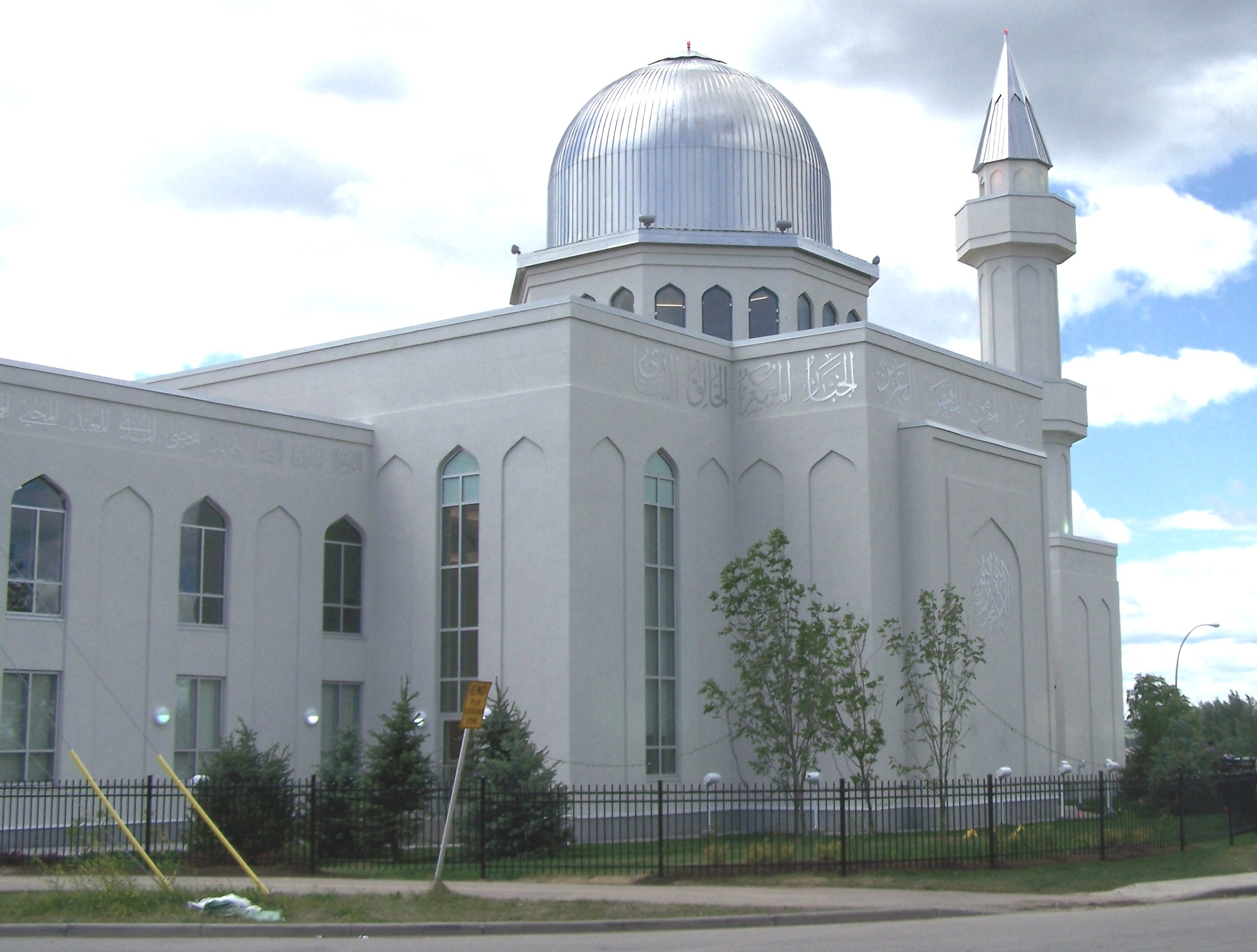

- Location within Calgary

Religion
- Affiliation: Ahmadiyya Islam
- Ecclesiastical or organisational status: Mosque
- Status: Active
- Religious features: 400 kg (880 lb) chandelier; Steel-capped dome and minaret

Location
- Location: 4353 54 Avenue NE, Calgary, Alberta
- Country: Canada
- Coordinates: 51°06′06″N 113°58′19″W

Architecture
- Architects: Naseer Ahmad; Manu Chugh Architects
- Type: Mosque architecture
- Groundbreaking: 2005
- Completed: 2008
- Construction cost: C$15 million

Specifications
- Interior area: 4,500 m^{2} (48,000 sq ft)
- Dome: 2
- Minaret: 1
- Minaret height: 97 feet (30 m)
- Materials: Steel

Website
- baitunnur.org

The Baitun Nur (Urdu: مسجد بیت النور, lit. 'House of Light') is an Ahmadiyya mosque in Calgary, Alberta, Canada. It is located in the Castleridge community of Calgary.

== History ==
The cornerstone of the mosque was laid in 2005. Construction was completed in 2008 at an estimated self-funded cost of C$15 million, with roughly C$8 million raised from the approximately 3,000 local Ahmadi Muslims. As of 2008, it was the largest mosque in Canada.

== Inauguration ==
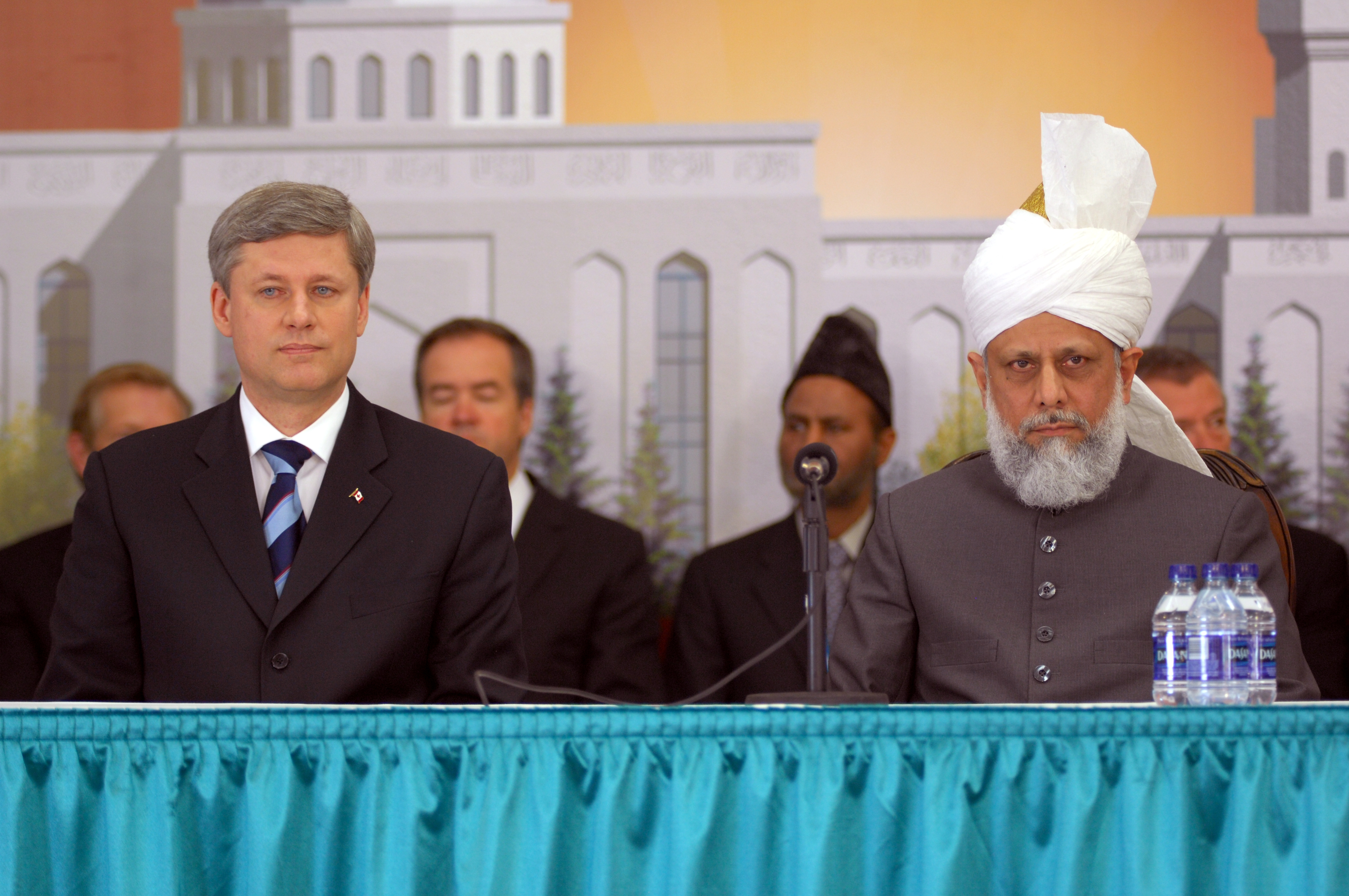
Prime Minister Stephen Harper (left) seated with Mirza Masroor Ahmad (right) at the grand opening of Baitun Nur

Baitun Nur celebrated its grand opening on July 5, 2008; 5,000 people were in attendance. Dignitaries who attended the opening included Canadian Prime Minister Stephen Harper, Opposition Leader Stéphane Dion, and Calgary Mayor Dave Bronconnier. The Roman Catholic Bishop of Calgary, Fred Henry, also attended. Mirza Masroor Ahmad, the current head of the Ahmadiyya Muslim Community, oversaw the opening.

At the opening, Prime Minister Harper said "Calgarians, Albertans and Canadians will see the moderate, benevolent face of Islam in this mosque and the people who worship here." Afterward, a governing party insider said "It's an important signal the prime minister is sending, not just to militant Islamists abroad, but to their sympathizers here at home, that he's perfectly prepared to ignore them and side with persecuted minorities within the faith."

== Architecture ==
Baitun Nur was designed by Naseer Ahmad and Manu Chugh Architects; it was the seventh Ahmadiyya mosque designed by Ahmad.

The mosque complex is 4,500 m^{2} (48,000 sq ft) in size. A 97-foot-tall (30 m) steel-capped minaret tower and large steel dome are its most prominent external features. Around the exterior of the building are written 99 Arabic words, each an attribute of Allah's character as stated in the Qur'an.

In addition to serving as a place of worship, the mosque complex includes classrooms, office space, a children's area, a kitchen and a community centre. In the prayer hall of the mosque hangs a 400-kilogram (880 lb) chandelier that cost $50,000.

== Gallery ==
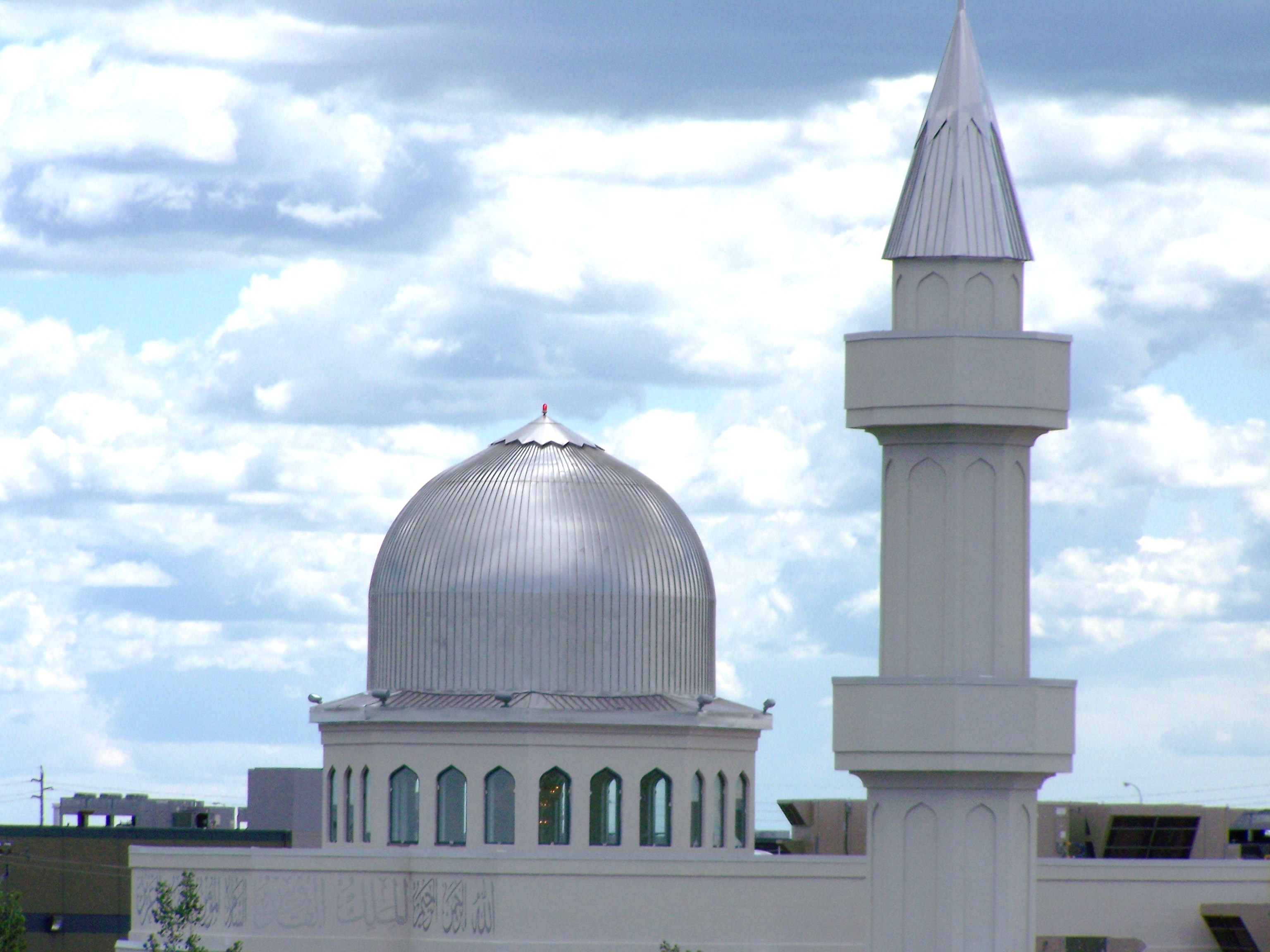
Baitun Nur's steel dome and steel-capped minaret tower

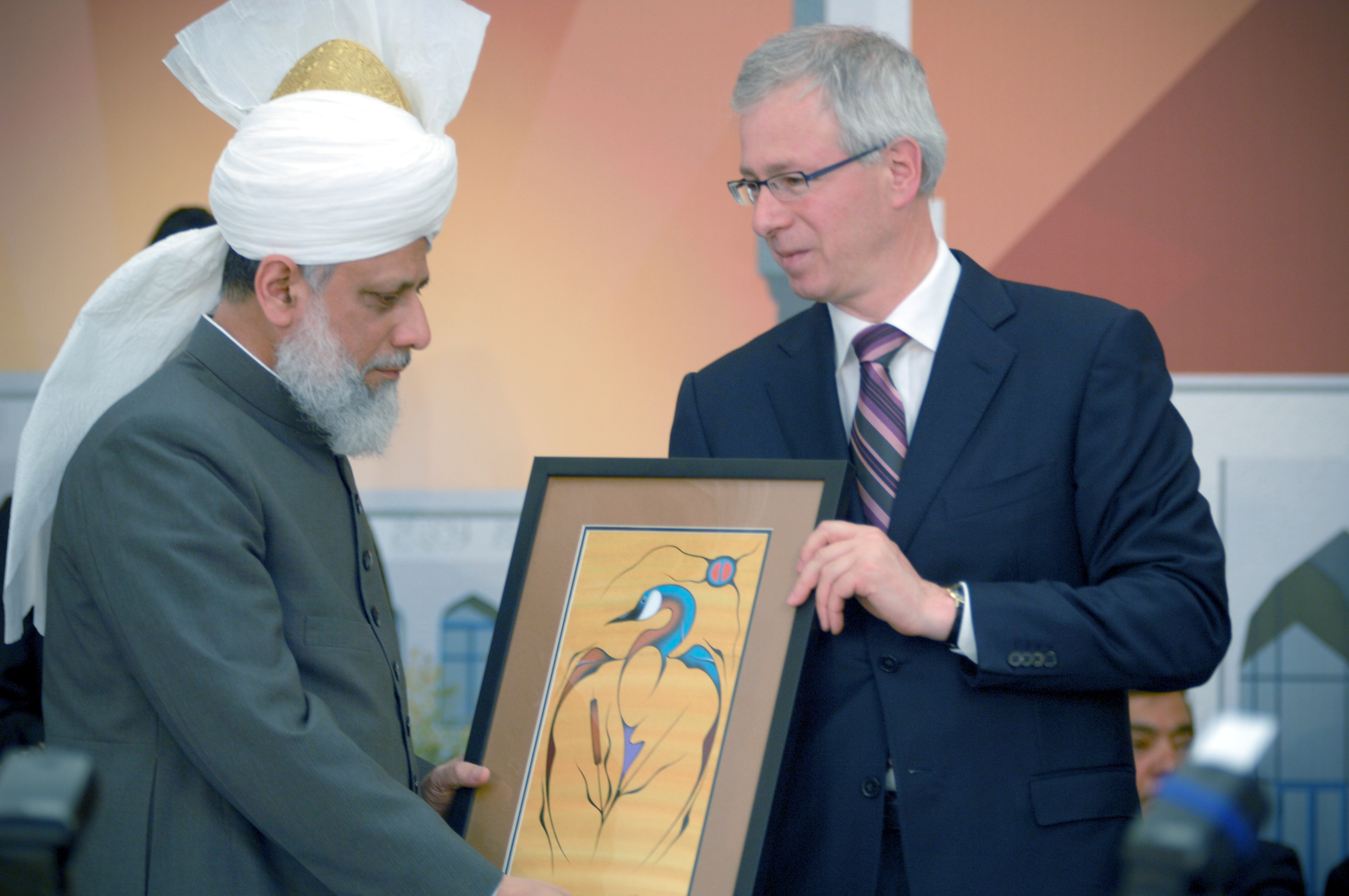
Masroor Ahmad (left) and Liberal Opposition Leader Stephane Dion at the inauguration of Baitun Nur

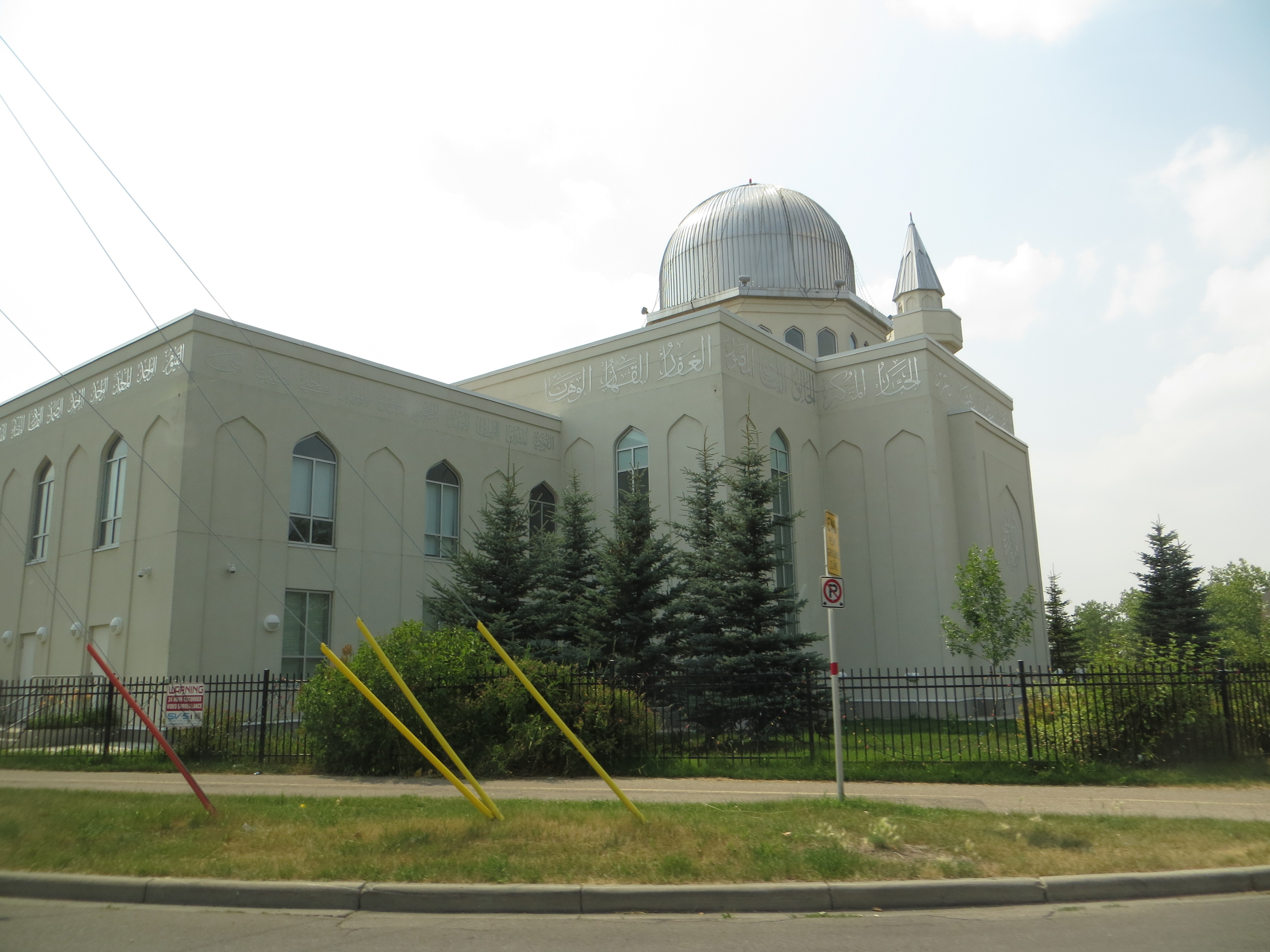
Vew of the mosque

== See also ==
- Islam in Canada
- List of mosques in Canada
