= What's Come Over You =

Single by Paul Brandt

from the album Outside the Frame
- Released: December 20, 1997
- Genre: Country
- Length: 3:29
- Label: Reprise
- Songwriters: Gene Nelson; Doug Swander
- Producer: Josh Leo

Paul Brandt singles chronology
"A Little in Love" (1997)	"What's Come Over You" (1997)	"Yeah!" (1998)

"What's Come Over You" is a song recorded by Canadian country music artist Paul Brandt. It was released in 1997 as the second single from his second studio album, Outside the Frame. It peaked at number 10 on the RPM Country Tracks chart in March 1998.

== Chart performance ==
Chart (1997–1998)	Peak position
Canada Country Singles (RPM)	10
US Hot Country Songs (Billboard)	68
