= List of number-one country albums of 1999 (Canada) =

These are the Canadian number-one country albums of 1999, per the RPM Country Albums chart.

Issue date	Album	Artist
January 11	Double Live	Garth Brooks
January 18	Come on Over	Shania Twain
January 25	Come on Over	Shania Twain
February 1	Double Live	Garth Brooks
February 8	Come on Over	Shania Twain
February 15	Wide Open Spaces	Dixie Chicks
February 22	Wide Open Spaces	Dixie Chicks
March 1	Come on Over	Shania Twain
March 8	Come on Over	Shania Twain
March 15	Come on Over	Shania Twain
March 22	Come on Over	Shania Twain
March 29	Come on Over	Shania Twain
April 5	Come on Over	Shania Twain
April 12	Come on Over	Shania Twain
April 19	Come on Over	Shania Twain
April 26	Come on Over	Shania Twain
May 3	Come on Over	Shania Twain
May 10	Come on Over	Shania Twain
May 17	Come on Over	Shania Twain
May 24	Come on Over	Shania Twain
May 31	Come on Over	Shania Twain
June 7	Come on Over	Shania Twain
June 14	Come on Over	Shania Twain
June 21	Come on Over	Shania Twain
June 28	Come on Over	Shania Twain
July 5	That's the Truth	Paul Brandt
July 12	Come on Over	Shania Twain
July 19	Come on Over	Shania Twain
July 26	Come on Over	Shania Twain
August 2	Come on Over	Shania Twain
August 9	Come on Over	Shania Twain
August 16	Come on Over	Shania Twain
August 23	Come on Over	Shania Twain
August 30	Come on Over	Shania Twain
September 6	Come on Over	Shania Twain
September 13	Come on Over	Shania Twain
September 20	Wide Open Spaces	Dixie Chicks
September 27	Fly	Dixie Chicks
October 4	Come on Over	Shania Twain
October 11	Come on Over	Shania Twain
October 18	Come on Over	Shania Twain
October 25	Come on Over	Shania Twain
November 1	Come on Over	Shania Twain
November 8	Come on Over	Shania Twain
November 15	Come on Over	Shania Twain
November 22	Come on Over	Shania Twain
November 29	Breathe	Faith Hill
December 6	Come on Over	Shania Twain
December 13	Come on Over	Shania Twain
December 20	Come on Over	Shania Twain
