= A Paul Brandt Christmas: Shall I Play for You? =

Studio album by Paul Brandt
- Released: November 17, 1998
- Genre: Country
- Length: 34:43
- Label: Reprise
- Producer: Josh Leo

Paul Brandt chronology
| Outside the Frame (1997) | A Paul Brandt Christmas: Shall I Play for You? (1998) | That's the Truth (1999) |

Professional ratings
Review scores
| Source | Rating |
|---|---|
| Allmusic | link |

A Paul Brandt Christmas: Shall I Play for You? is the first Christmas album by Canadian country music singer Paul Brandt. While some tracks are covers of traditional songs, others are covers of more modern Christmas material. "Santa Looked a Lot Like Daddy", a duet with Terri Clark, is a cover of the Buck Owens song, and "Run Run Rudolph" is a cover of the Johnny Marks song. Additionally, "Six Tons of Toys" is a cover of a Dave Dudley song, which itself is a rewrite of Dudley's signature song "Six Days on the Road".

== Track listing ==
1. "Little Drummer Boy" (Katherine Davis, Henry Onorati, Harry Simeone) – 4:10
2. "Santa Looked a Lot Like Daddy" (Buck Owens, Don Rich) – 2:15
  - with Terri Clark
3. "What Child Is This" (William Chatterton Dix) – 5:01
  - with Union Station
4. "Run Run Rudolph" (Marvin Brodie, Johnny Marks) – 2:53
  - with Kim Richey
5. "A Star Is Born" (Paul Brandt) – 3:29
6. "The Way in a Manger" (Paul Brandt) – 3:54
  - with Union Station
7. "Jingle Bells" (J.S. Pierpont) – 2:58
8. "Silent Night" (Franz Xaver Gruber, Joseph Mohr) – 3:30
9. "Six Tons of Toys" (Dave Dudley) – 3:09
10. "O Holy Night" (Adolphe Adam, John Sullivan Dwight) – 3:34

== Chart performance ==
| Chart (1998) | Peak position |
|---|---|
| Canadian RPM Country Albums | 27 |
