= Just as I Am (hymn) =

Christian hymn written by Charlotte Elliott

- Hymn
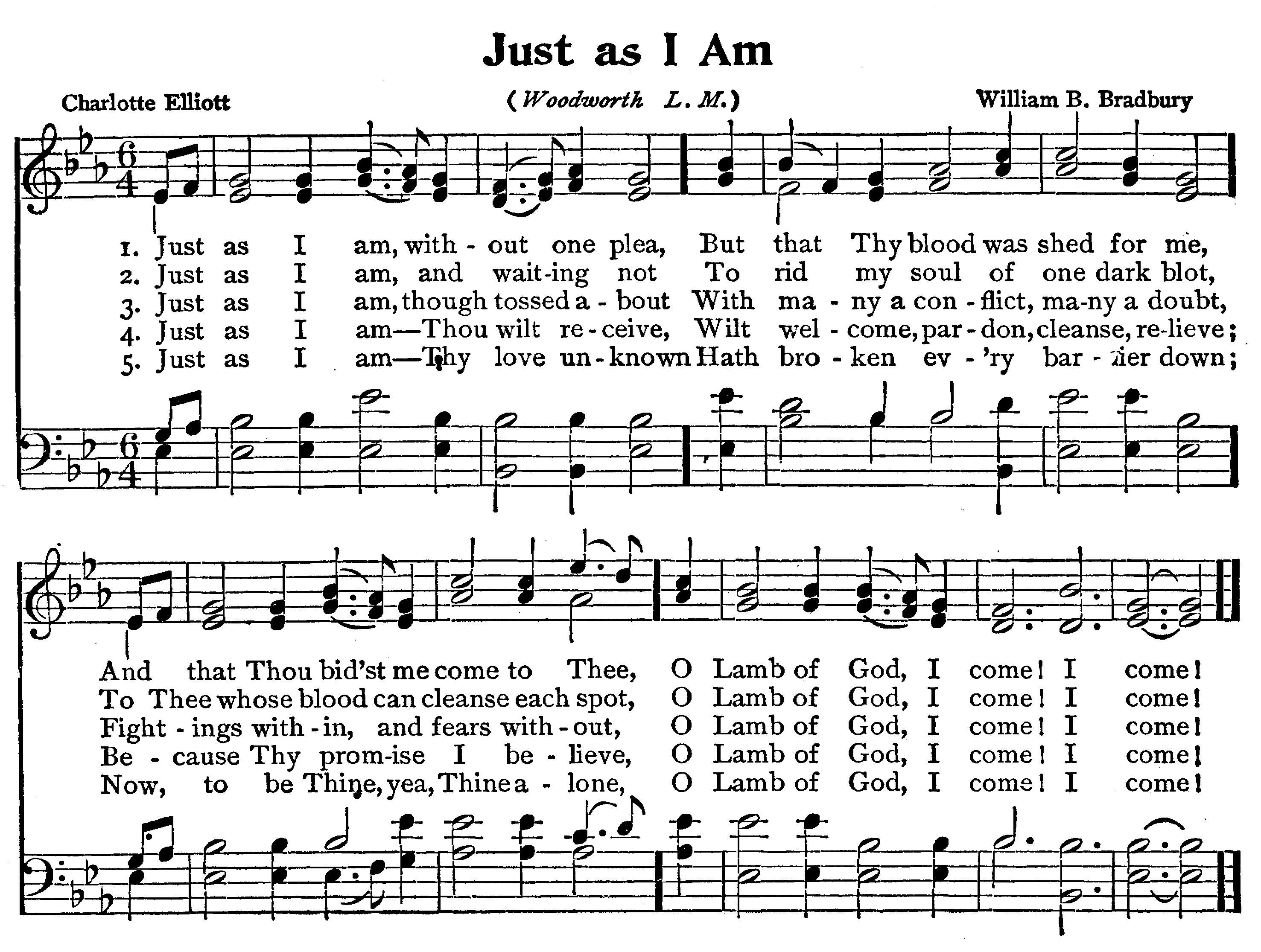
- The hymn with music by Bradbury
- Written: 1835
- Text: by Charlotte Elliott
- Meter: 8.8.8.6
- Melody: "Woodworth" by William B. Bradbury and others
- Time: 6/4
- Published: 1835
- Publisher: Christian Remembrancer

"Just as I Am" is a Christian hymn, written by Charlotte Elliott in 1835, first appearing in the Christian Remembrancer, of which Elliott became the editor in 1836. The final verse is taken from Elliott's Hours of Sorrow Cheered and Comforted (1836).

== Music ==
It has been set to at least four hymn tunes:

- The original, "Woodworth", was written by William B. Bradbury, and was first published in the Third Book of Psalmody in 1849. The "Woodworth" tune was first used for the hymn "The God of Love Will Soon Indulge". Thomas Hastings adapted Bradbury's tune for "Just as I Am" years later.
- In 1890, Arthur H. Brown wrote "Saffron Walden" which was published in The Hymnal Companion.
- It can also be sung to Gwylfa by D. Lloyd Evans.
- John Rogers Thomas wrote a setting for his Hymns of the Church series.
- It is also sung to the Henry Thomas Smart tune "Misericordia".

== History ==
John Brownlie described the hymn's story in his book The Hymns and Hymn Writers of the Church Hymnary: Charlotte's brother, the Rev. H. V. Elliott planned to hold a charity bazaar designed to give, at a nominal cost, a high education to the daughters of clergymen supported by St Mary Church:

The night before the bazaar she was kept wakeful by distressing thoughts of her apparent uselessness; and these thoughts passed by a transition easy to imagine into a spiritual conflict, till she questioned the reality of her whole spiritual life, and wondered whether it were anything better after all than an illusion of the emotions, an illusion ready to be sorrowfully dispelled. The next day, the busy day of the bazaar, she lay upon her sofa in that most pleasant boudoir set apart for her in Westfield Lodge, ever a dear resort to her friends." The troubles of the night came back upon her with such force that she felt they must be met and conquered in the grace of God. She gathered up in her soul the great certainties, not of her emotions, but of her salvation: her Lord, His power, His promise. And taking pen and paper from the table she deliberately set down in writing, for her own comfort, "the formulae of her faith." Hers was a heart which always tended to express its depths in verse. So in verse she restated to herself the Gospel of pardon, peace, and heaven. "Probably without difficulty or long pause" she wrote the hymn, getting comfort by thus definitely "recollecting" the eternity of the Rock beneath her feet. There, then, always, not only for some past moment, but " even now " she was accepted in the Beloved "Just as I am".

== Original poem ==
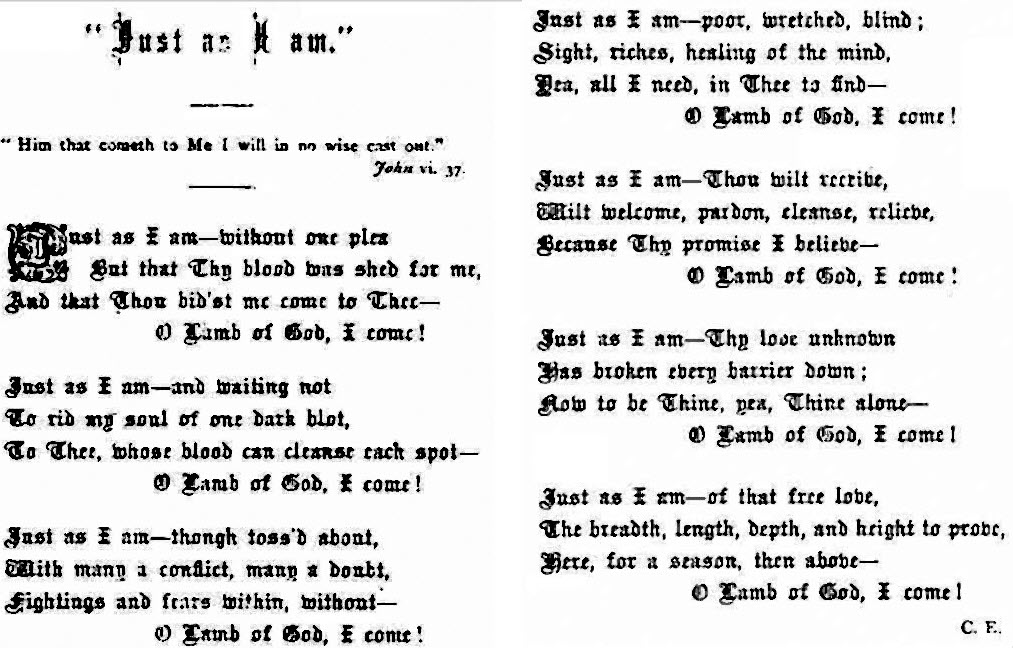
Just as I am

Just as I am - without one plea,
But that Thy blood was shed for me,
And that Thou bidst me come to Thee,
-O Lamb of God, I come!

Just as I am - and waiting not
To rid my soul of one dark blot,
To Thee, whose blood can cleanse each spot,
-O Lamb of God, I come!

Just as I am - though toss'd about
With many a conflict, many a doubt,
Fightings and fears within, without,
-O Lamb of God, I come!

Just as I am - poor, wretched, blind;
Sight, riches, healing of the mind,
Yea, all I need, in Thee to find,
-O Lamb of God, I come!

Just as I am - Thou wilt receive,
Wilt welcome, pardon, cleanse, relieve;
Because Thy promise I believe,
-O Lamb of God, I come!

Just as I am - Thy love unknown
Has broken every barrier down;
Now to be Thine, yea, Thine alone,
-O Lamb of God, I come!

Just as I am - of that free love
The breadth, length, depth, and height to prove,
Here for a season, then above,
-O Lamb of God, I come!

== Altar song in the Billy Graham crusades ==
Billy Graham converted to Christianity in 1934 in a revival meeting in Charlotte, North Carolina, led by evangelist Mordecai Ham hearing the altar call song "Just as I Am". This song became an altar call song in the Billy Graham crusades in the latter half of the twentieth century. Graham used the title of the hymn as the title of his 1997 book - Just as I Am: The Autobiography of Billy Graham. Michael W. Smith sang the song in a tribute to Graham at the 44th GMA Dove Awards.

== Recordings ==
This song appears or is referenced on the following albums:

- 1959 – Hymns by Johnny Cash: "Are All the Children In" by Johnny Cash - background music
- 1975 – Red Headed Stranger by Willie Nelson
- 1975 – Johnny Cash Sings Precious Memories by Johnny Cash
- 1989 – The Altar, by Ray Boltz
- 1994 - Wondrous Love by Jay Leach
- 1999 – Just as I Am by Johnny Cash
- 2002 – Traveling Mercies by Chris Potter
- 2005 – As I Am by Kristin Chenoweth
- 2009 – Daisy by Brand New
- 2011 – In Times of Sorrow by Pádraigín Ní Uallacháin
- 2011 – A River with No End by Ghost Ship (Mars Hill Church)
- 2012 – Just as I Am by Paul Brandt
- 2013 – Words of Life by Frank Morgan (Chilean gospel singer) - this album also features the Spanish version of this hymn, "Tal como soy"
- 2021 – Living for the Other Side by Hillbilly Thomists
- 2021 – My Savior - Carrie Underwood
