= I'm an Open Road =

2015 single by Paul Brandt

Single by Paul Brandt featuring Jess Moskaluke

from the EP Borderlines
- Released: July 31, 2015
- Genre: Country
- Length: 3:54
- Label: Brand-T; Road Angel; Warner Canada
- Songwriter(s): Paul Brandt; Greg Sczebel
- Producer(s): Ben Fowler

Paul Brandt singles chronology
"Nothing" (2015)	"I'm an Open Road" (2015)	"The Journey" (2017)

Jess Moskaluke singles chronology
"Night We Won't Forget" (2015)	"I'm an Open Road" (2015)	"Kiss Me Quiet" (2015)

Music video
- "I'm an Open Road" on YouTube

"I'm an Open Road" is a song recorded by Canadian country artist Paul Brandt featuring Jess Moskaluke. Brandt co-wrote the track with Greg Sczebel, and it was produced by Ben Fowler. It was the fourth single off Brandt's 2015 extended play Borderlines.

== Background ==
Brandt wrote the song with soul music artist Greg Sczebel, better known as "Sebell". He described the song as being about "the hero in the song wanting to rescue someone who is struggling with allowing herself to be rescued". He said it went through about three revisions before they reached the final version. Brandt described Jess Moskaluke as the "most talented female vocalist Canada has seen in a long time" and said she took the song to a "higher level".

== Critical reception ==
Top Country named "I'm an Open Road" their "Pick of the Week" for September 9, 2015.

== Commercial performance ==
"I'm an Open Road" reached a peak of number 7 on the Billboard Canada Country chart dated November 14, 2015, and a peak of number 93 on the Billboard Canadian Hot 100 chart dated October 17, 2015. It has been certified Gold by Music Canada.

== Music video ==
The official music video for "I'm an Open Road" was directed by Sam Ciurdar and premiered on September 14, 2015.

== Charts ==
Chart (2015)	Peak position
Canada (Canadian Hot 100)	93
Canada Country (Billboard)	7

== Certifications ==
Region	Certification	Certified units/sales
Canada (Music Canada)	Gold	40,000^{‡}
^{‡} Sales+streaming figures based on certification alone.
