= William Batchelder Bradbury =

American musician and composer

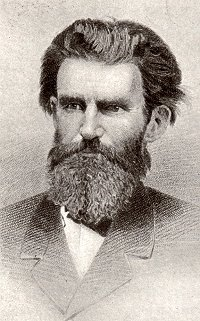

William Batchelder Bradbury (October 6, 1816 – January 7, 1868) was an American musician, hymnwriter, and businessman who is best known for his melodies to "Jesus Loves Me", "Just as I Am", and "Sweet Hour of Prayer".

== Biography ==
=== Life and career ===
William Batchelder Bradbury was born on October 6, 1816, in York, Maine. His father was the director of a church choir. William began studying music when he was 17 years old, when he and his family moved to Boston, Massachusetts, where he came under the tutelage of Lowell Mason and George Webb at their Academy of Music.

By age 18, Bradbury had become an organist. With the help of Lowell Mason, he was offered teaching positions at two different singing schools in Machias, Maine, and St. John, New Brunswick, Canada, before settling down in New York City, where he worked as a music teacher, initially at the First Baptist Church in Brooklyn, then at the Baptist Tabernacle. He took a year off in 1847 to travel to Germany, where he furthered his skills in harmony, composition, and vocal and instrumental music. After his return to the States, he started the Bradbury Piano Company with his brother, Edward, in New York City. Bradbury pianos became known for having traditional tone of an organ with the mechanics of a standard piano.

By 1841, Bradbury began holding free singing classes for children, which became very popular. He would hold Juvenile Music Festivals annually, where as many as a thousand uniformed children stood on risers together and sang under his direction. Not only did he compose and publish a series of musical works for choirs and schools, three million copies of his Sunday School collections – Golden Trio, Golden Chain, Golden Shower, and Golden Censer – were sold.

Bradbury was known for his generosity. A theology student once wrote him a letter, asking for a loan of five dollars so that he could buy himself a pair of boots; in answer, he got a check from Bradbury for $25, along with a note stating that he couldn’t spare $5 at the moment, but he could manage to do without the $25 until he could send $5 later.

=== Death ===
For the last two years of his life, Bradbury suffered from tuberculosis. Just a few weeks before his death, he told a friend, “I long to be free from this evil body, which does so much to drag me down.” The Saturday before he died, it was somewhat different; he remarked to another friend, “My soul seems to have gained the victory. I am so happy now. I rest wholly upon God. May God give me the grace to die. I am going to see Mother.”

That same week a number of children from the town where he lived (Bloomfield, New Jersey, back then, but called Montclair now) came to visit him, bringing oak leaves which were made into a wreath; it was later laid on his coffin and buried with him. He died on January 7, 1868, at the age of 51, laid to rest next to his mother; her favorite song, “Asleep in Jesus”, which was sung at her own funeral, was also sung at his. (Written by Margaret Mackay [1802-1887] and published in 1832 in The Amethyst, Bradbury put her poem to music in 1843.)

== Songs ==
In 1862, Bradbury came across a poem in an 1860 novel titled Say and Seal. Written by Susan Warner (1819-1885), the poem itself, sung by a Sunday School teacher to a dying boy, was written by her sister, Anna Bartlett Warner. It became the source for "Jesus Loves Me", a favorite children's song to which Bradbury put the melody; he also added a chorus with the words "Yes, Jesus love me; yes, Jesus loves me; yes, Jesus loves me, the Bible tells me so."

Bradbury composed the music for a number of other gospel songs that have remained popular to this day:

“He Leadeth Me”

"Holy Bible, Book Divine”

“Just as I Am”

“Savior, Like a Shepherd Lead Us”

“Sweet Hour of Prayer”

“The Solid Rock”

Besides the tunes he produced for his best-known songs, Bradbury also published a series of musical collections for choirs and school, authoring or compiling fifty-nine books starting in 1841.
