= Small Towns and Big Dreams =

Live album by Paul Brandt
- Released: November 6, 2001
- Recorded: March 16 – April 15, 2001
- Genre: Country
- Length: 40:34
- Label: Brand-T Records
- Producer: Paul Brandt, Ben Fowler, Steve Rosen

Paul Brandt chronology
What I Want to Be Remembered For (2000)	Small Towns and Big Dreams (2001)	This Time Around (2004)

Small Towns and Big Dreams is the first live album by Canadian country music singer Paul Brandt. The album was released on Brandt's own record label, Brand-T Records.

The album features all new material recorded during a cross-country tour of small Canadian towns. The first single, "Canadian Man", was recorded in the studio. It peaked at number one on the Canadian Singles Chart.

Small Towns and Big Dreams won the 2002 Canadian Country Music Association Award for Album of the Year. The title track was nominated for Single of the Year.

== Track listing ==
1. "Small Towns and Big Dreams" (Paul Brandt) – 5:19
2. "I'm Gonna Fly" (Brandt, Jon Vezner) – 3:11
3. "Take It Off" (Brandt) – 3:28
4. "Warm Sunny Beaches" (Brandt) – 4:20
5. "Cry If You Want To" (Casey Scott) – 3:18
6. "If This Isn't Love" (Brandt, Gene Pistilli) – 2:59
7. "When You Call My Name" (Brandt) – 4:02
8. "It's All Good" (Brandt) – 2:27
9. "Virgil and the Holy Ghost" (Brandt, Steve Rosen) – 3:51
10. "The Longest Way" (Brandt) – 4:20
11. "Canadian Man" (Steven Graham Pineo) – 3:19

== Year-end charts ==
Chart (2001)	Position
Canadian Country Albums (Nielsen SoundScan)	68

Chart (2002)	Position
Canadian Country Albums (Nielsen SoundScan)	28
