= The Sycamore Tree (song) =

Single by Paul Brandt

from the album That's the Truth
- Released: 2000
- Genre: Country
- Length: 5:19
- Label: Reprise
- Songwriters: Paul Brandt; Steve Rosen
- Producer: Chris Farren

Paul Brandt singles chronology
"That Hurts" (2000)	"The Sycamore Tree" (2000)	"What I Want to Be Remembered For" (2000)

"The Sycamore Tree" is a song recorded by Canadian country music artist Paul Brandt. It was released in 2000 as the fourth single from his third studio album, That's the Truth. It peaked at number 7 on the RPM Country Tracks chart in April 2000.

== Chart performance ==
Chart (2000)	Peak position
Canada Country Singles (RPM)	7
