= Castleridge, Calgary =

Castleridge
- Neighbourhood
- Location of Castleridge in Calgary
- Coordinates: 51°06′29″N 113°57′34″W
- Country: Canada
- Province: Alberta
- City: Calgary
- Quadrant: NE
- Ward: 5
- Established: 1980
- Annexed: 1961

Government
  - Mayor: Jeromy Farkas
  - Administrative body: Calgary City Council
  - Councillor: Raj Dhaliwal (Independent)

Area
  - Total: 1.4 km^{2} (0.54 sq mi)
- Elevation: 1,090 m (3,580 ft)

Population (2006)
  - Total: 6,180
  - Average Income: $57,923
- Website: Castleridge Community Association

Castleridge is a residential neighbourhood in the northeast quadrant of Calgary, Alberta. It is located east of the Calgary International Airport and is bounded by 64 Avenue NE to the north, Métis Trail to the west, McKnight Boulevard to the south and Falconridge Boulevard to the east.

Castleridge was established in 1980 on land transferred from the Municipal District of Rocky View to the city in 1961. It is represented in the Calgary City Council by the Ward 5 councillor.

In 2008 the Ahmadiyya Muslim Community opened Baitun Nur, the largest mosque in Canada, in Castleridge.

== Demographics ==
In the City of Calgary's 2021 municipal census, Castleridge had a population of 6,130 living in 1,880 dwellings With a land area of 1.2 km^{2} (0.46 sq mi), it had a population density of 5,110/km^{2} (13,200/sq mi) in 2021.

Residents in this community had a median household income of $87,000 in 2021, and 11% of Castleridge residents were low-income. As of 2021, 50% of the residents were immigrants. A proportion of 8% of the buildings were condominiums or apartments, and 31% of the housing was used for renting. 24% of Castleridge residents spent 30%+ of their income on housing, more than the Calgary average of 23%.

== Crime ==
In the May 2023-May 2024 data period, Castleridge had a crime rate of 1.615/100, a decrease from the previous data period.

This puts it at this comparison to other Calgary communities: Saddle Ridge (1.358/100), Castleridge (1.615/100), Whitehorn (1.741/100), Rundle (2.342/100), Brentwood (2.348/100), Acadia (2.542/100), Bowness (2.934/100), Shawnessy (3.296/100), Inglewood (3.438/100), Sunnyside (3.650/100), Marlborough (4.703/100), Southwood (5.147/100), Sunalta (5.307/100), Montgomery (5.483/100), Forest Lawn (6.528/100), Rosscarrock (7.049/100), Downtown Commercial Core (12.705/100), Downtown East Village (15.605/100), Manchester (43.368/100).

=== Crime data by year ===
Crime Data
Year	Crime Rate (/100 pop.)
2018	2.1
2019	2.2
2020	2.9
2021	2.7
2022	2.3
2023	2.1

== See also ==
- List of neighbourhoods in Calgary
