= This Time Around (Paul Brandt album) =

Studio album by Paul Brandt
- Released: August 3, 2004
- Genre: Country
- Length: 47:44
- Label: Orange
- Producer: Paul Brandt, Steve Rosen

Paul Brandt chronology
Small Towns and Big Dreams (2001)	This Time Around (2004)	A Gift (2006)

Professional ratings
Review scores
Source	Rating
AllMusic	3.5/5 stars

This Time Around is the fourth studio album by Canadian country music singer Paul Brandt, released on Orange Music Canada, a subsidiary of Universal Music Group, in 2004. The record features a guest appearance by Keith Urban, who plays guitar on "Leavin'." This song was later released by Blaine Larsen in 2010. The album also features a remake of the C. W. McCall song "Convoy". It was recorded at The Orchard Studio near Nashville, TN and produced by Steve Rosen and Paul Brandt.

== Track listing ==
All songs written by Paul Brandt except where noted.

1. "Convoy (C.W. McCall cover)" (Chip Davis, Bill Fries) – 4:32
2. "Leavin'" – 5:07
3. "Home" – 4:11
4. "Alberta Bound" – 3:47
5. "Run to Me" (Brandt, Deric Ruttan) – 4:38
6. "The King" – 3:54
7. "Live Now" – 4:03
8. "Rich Man" (Brandt, Brad Johner) – 3:34
9. "I Still Do" (Brandt, Steve Rosen, Jason Blaine) – 4:32
10. "This Time Around" – 3:36
11. "That's What I Love About Jesus" – 5:50
12. "Hope" – 4:23 (Hidden Track)
