= Canadian Man =

Single by Paul Brandt

from the album Small Towns and Big Dreams
- Released: May 2001
- Genre: Country
- Length: 3:19
- Label: Brand-T
- Songwriter(s): Steven Graham Pineo
- Producer(s): Paul Brandt, Ben Fowler, Steve Rosen

Paul Brandt singles chronology
"There's Nothing I Wouldn't Do" (2001)	"Canadian Man" (2001)	"Small Towns and Big Dreams" (2001)

"Canadian Man" (also titled Canadian Man: Hockey) is a song written by Steven Graham Pineo and recorded by Canadian country music artist Paul Brandt. It was released in May 2001 as the lead single from his live album, Small Towns and Big Dreams. The hockey version of the song reached number-one on the Canadian Singles Chart in March 2002, being his only hit to reach number-one on the all-genre format.

== Music video ==
The music video was directed by Joel Stewart and premiered in mid-2001.

== Olympic rewrite ==
Brandt changed certain lyrics in the song twice, to reflect the men's gold medal wins at the 2002 Winter Olympics and at the 2010 Winter Olympics.

== Chart performance ==
=== Weekly charts ===
Weekly chart performance for "Canadian Man"
Chart (2002)	Peak position
Canada (Nielsen SoundScan)	1

=== Year-end charts ===
Year-end chart performance for "Canadian Man"
Chart (2002)	Position
Canada (Nielsen SoundScan)	14
