= Alberta Bound (Paul Brandt song) =

2005 single by Paul Brandt

Single by Paul Brandt

from the album This Time Around
- Released: 2005
- Genre: Country
- Length: 3:47
- Label: Orange
- Songwriter: Paul Brandt

Paul Brandt singles chronology
"Rich Man" (2005)	"Alberta Bound" (2005)	"Didn't Even See the Dust" (2007)

Music video
- "Alberta Bound" on YouTube

"Alberta Bound" is a song written and recorded by Canadian country music artist Paul Brandt. The song was the fifth single from Brandt's 2004 album This Time Around.

== Background ==
Brandt was inspired to write "Alberta Bound" during a roughly ten-year period of time in which he was living in Nashville, Tennessee, and frequently touring. He would drive back home to Calgary, Alberta, every winter for Christmas, and pass a sign in Sweet Grass, Montana, which indicated it was 40 miles until the Canadian border. The sign would inspire the opening line in the song. Brandt later moved back to Alberta with his wife several years after the release of the song, desiring to raise their kids in Canada.

== Critical reception ==
Adrian Brjibassi of Vacay.ca referred to "Alberta Bound" as a "contemporary anthem for Alberta, one that would fit hand-in-hand with Ian Tyson's "Four Strong Winds.""

== Music video ==
The official music video for "Alberta Bound" features numerous scenes of the Province of Alberta, with various people engaging in local activities, while Brandt also performs the song outdoors.

== Credits and personnel ==
Credits adapted from Apple Music.

- Paul Brandt — background vocals, composition, lyrics
- Jeff Curtis — engineering
- Ben Flower — mix engineering
- Reid Waltz — engineering

== Charts ==
Chart performance for "Alberta Bound"
Chart (2005)	Peak position
Canada Country Tracks (Radio & Records)	4

== 2026 controversy ==
"Alberta Bound" received renewed attention in January 2026, after Brandt posted an image on social media platform X (formerly known as Twitter) on January 24, 2026, of him walking across a crosswalk with the lyrics to the song overlaid across the entire photo. The lyrics "Yeah, I've got independence in my veins" from the second verse were written in a more visible colour in the photo. The post came amidst a push for Alberta separatism by the "Alberta Prosperity Project", which is gathering signatures in an attempt to stage an independence referendum in the province. This post was viewed by some as a potential endorsement of the Alberta separatist movement by Brandt.

Brandt was later pressed by reporters to clarify his stance on the Alberta sepatism issue on January 26, 2026, at a press conference where he was speaking in his capacity as co-chair of the Alberta Centre to End Trafficking in Persons. Brandt refused to clarify his remarks, stating "It’s not up to me to make political statements to try and get people to move one way or another. I go out and live by example and I do the work that I do" and "You’re not going to get a yes or no." On the same day, Brandt issued a statement on X, where he stated "I wish that people cared as much about the fight against child sexual exploitation in our country as they do about a song lyric that was written in 2004," highlighting his commitment to fighting human trafficking across Canada.
