= A Gift (album) =

Studio album by Paul Brandt
- Released: November 7, 2006
- Genre: Country
- Length: 39:17
- Label: Orange Record Label
- Producer: Paul Brandt, Ben Fowler, David Pierce, Steve Rosen

Paul Brandt chronology
| This Time Around (2004) | A Gift (2006) | Risk (2007) |

Professional ratings
Review scores
| Source | Rating |
|---|---|
| Allmusic | 2.5/5 stars |

A Gift is the second Christmas album by Canadian country music singer Paul Brandt. It won the 2007 Gospel Music Association of Canada Covenant Award for Seasonal Album of the Year, while the title song "A Gift" won the Seasonal Song of the Year award. The track "Christmas Convoy" is a reworked version of Brandt's cover of C. W. McCall's "Convoy".

== Track listing ==
1. "Let It Snow" (Sammy Cahn, Jule Styne) – 3:00
2. "A Gift" (Paul Brandt) – 2:50
3. "White Christmas" (Irving Berlin) – 3:25
4. "Christmas Convoy" (P. Brandt, Chip Davis, Bill Fries) – 4:43
5. "Hands" (P. Brandt, Liz Brandt) – 4:33
6. "Go Tell It on the Mountain" (Public domain) – 4:52
7. "I'll Be Home for Christmas" (Kim Gannon, Walter Kent, Buck Ram) – 3:51
8. "Winter Wonderland" (Felix Bernard, Richard B. Smith) – 2:57
9. "Mary, Did You Know?" (Buddy Greene, Mark Lowry) – 3:30
10. "We Three Kings" (Reverend John H. Hopkins Jr.) – 5:36
