= Risk (Paul Brandt album) =

Studio album by Paul Brandt
- Released: September 11, 2007
- Genre: Country
- Length: 51:40
- Label: Brand-T Records
- Producer: Paul Brandt, Steve Rosen

Paul Brandt chronology
A Gift (2006)	Risk (2007)	Give It Away (2011)

Risk is the fifth studio album by Canadian country music singer Paul Brandt, released on September 11, 2007 on Brandt's own record label, Brand-T Records.

== Track listing ==
All tracks written by Paul Brandt except where noted.

1. "Didn't Even See the Dust" (Brandt, Steve Rosen) – 4:49
2. "Come On and Get Some" (Brandt, Rosen) – 3:19
3. "Virtual Life" – 3:32
4. "Worth Fighting For" – 4:04
5. "Risk" – 4:34
6. "Country Girl" – 4:04
7. "Hold On (Love Will Find You)" (Nichole Nordeman) – 5:53
8. "Learning How to Let It Go" – 5:14
9. "Scars Are Beautiful" – 4:12
10. "A Friend Like This" (Brandt, Rosen) – 4:39
11. "The Little Space Between" – 3:35
12. "Out Here on My Own" – 3:45

== Chart performance ==
Chart (2007)	Peak position
Canadian Albums Chart	4
