= Evangelical Missionary Church =

Canadian Christian denomination

Evangelical Missionary Church of Canada
- Abbreviation: EMCC
- Theology: Evangelical; Anabaptist; Mennonite; Wesleyan
- Polity: Congregational
- Governance: Board of Directors; EMCC National Team
- President: Dr. John Cressman
- Headquarters: Kitchener, Ontario & Calgary, Alberta
- Origin: 1993
- Merger of: The Evangelical Church in Canada & The Missionary Church of Canada
- Places of worship: 150+
- Official website: https://www.emcc.ca
- Slogan: Following Jesus Together

The Evangelical Missionary Church of Canada (EMCC) is a Canadian Christian denomination with historical roots from plants in the pioneer settlement of Ontario and the Canadian West, earlier European migration to the eastern seaboard of the US, and the Protestant Reformation in Europe. Its present identity comes through the 1993 merger of the Evangelical Church in Canada (formerly a conference of the Evangelical Church in North America) and the Missionary Church of Canada, which, before 1987, were two districts of The Missionary Church Christian denomination.

The Evangelical Church in Canada had a tradition of evangelistic fervour and fundamentalism, practice of spiritual disciplines and emphasis on the Holy Spirit that characterized John Wesley's early Methodist teaching, particularly as it impacted early North American German-speaking immigrants. The Missionary Church of Canada, which originated in the later revival movements in North America in the latter half for the 19th century, contributed the Anabaptist concepts of community, brotherhood and believer's baptism which were distinguishing marks of the Missionary Church's Swiss Mennonite background.

== Affiliated organisations ==
There are approximately 150 Evangelical Missionary churches, the majority of which are in Ontario, Alberta and British Columbia. Presently Centre Street Church in Calgary is the EMCC's (as well as Canada's) largest church.

The EMCC has launched two colleges: Rocky Mountain College in Calgary, Alberta, and Emmanuel Bible College in Kitchener, Ontario. These institutions have trained over three thousand students to become pastors, church leaders and missionaries.

The denomination also runs or is affiliated with 6 camps across Canada.

The denomination also sends and supports about 85 missionaries in 24 countries (including some in Canada), under both its own program (EMCC World Partners) and other mission agencies with evangelical and holistic emphases.

== Pitch & Praise and JR Pitch ==
Pitch and Praise (stylized Pitch'n'Praise) was a non-denominational Christian event aimed at reaching out to high school students across Ontario. As one of the largest gatherings of youth in Ontario, Canada, it drew crowds of over 2,000 youth at its peak. It was the brainchild of Dr. Denis Bell in 1974, and run by the Evangelical Missionary Church. The event was held annually on the May long weekend. Pitch was held at Stayner Camp until 2006. Due to the ever-growing attendance, limitations of the existing facilities, and noise complaints, Pitch & Praise was moved to Paris, Ontario at Braeside Pentecostal Camp, which is maintained by the Pentecostal Assemblies of Canada.

The attendees camped out in tents, trailers, or cabins and spent the weekend engaged in various activities. The central program of the weekend was the general sessions. Highlighted by a featured band and a speaker, these sessions were intended to provide an atmosphere in which the Gospel was communicated in relevant and contemporary ways. Over the years, the message of Pitch did not change, though the medium did. Many bands took part in Pitch and Praise throughout the years, including Randy Stonehill, Servant, Newsboys, Pillar, and Starfield

There were also sports tournaments, workshops, video game tournaments, and an annual battle of the bands (in which the winner was awarded recording time in a studio). Added in 2002, the Club became a successful feature of Pitch. International EDM artists such as Andy Hunter, Galactus Jack, DJ Kubiks, and DJ Chris Harrington took part in Pitch and Praise, both in the club and during main sessions.

In its later years, Pitch and Praise was criticized by some youth groups in attendance for hosting "controversial" speakers (i.e. LGBTQ+ affirming speakers, Peter Rollins, who considers himself Christian but not religious, and Drew Marshall, who titled himself an atheist at the time), while also drawing criticism from other groups for "playing it safe" with speakers (i.e. Hamilton pastor Kevin Makins was removed from the speaker lineup by denominational leadership for his open stance on LGBTQ+ issues.)

Pitch and Praise was discontinued by the leadership of the Evangelical Missionary Church of Canada (EMCC), in 2018. According to the EMCC website, there were plans for Pitch to undergo a reboot, targeted specifically at youth from the EMCC denomination, and operating under a modified name: “Pitch - The Weekend," based on an event ("The Weekend") held by the denomination in western Canada. EMCC stated that this new event would "bring youth to an understanding of how [Jesus] thinks about the challenges they are facing. We understand their challenges to be around confused messages that come at them about such themes as - identity including sexual identity and who Jesus says they are; truth and its source; desires that feel so right but which lead to unhealthy consequences...". Pitch - The Weekend did not take place in 2019 as proposed, and future plans for the event are on hold indefinitely.

In 2019, a new non-denominational conference called "Phoenix Fest" was created by youth pastors from several EMCC churches to provide youth groups with a similar spring retreat in lieu of Pitch and Praise. Phoenix Fest 2019 was considered a success, and due to high demand, will continue to operate annually for the foreseeable future.

In 1994 JR Pitch was established to reach out to Jr. High students (grades 6-8), and grew to be attended by over 1,000 pre-teens from across Ontario. JR Pitch took place annually during September and, like Pitch & Praise, was held in Stayner, Ontario at Stayner Camp. JR Pitch was put on indefinite hiatus in 2018. REBOOT, a retreat for Jr. High students and a spiritual successor to JR. Pitch, began in 2023 at Stayner Camp.

== Bibliography ==
- Lageer, E. Common Bonds. Calgary: Evangelical Missionary Church of Canada, 2004
