= Outside the Frame (song) =

Single by Paul Brandt

from the album Outside the Frame
- Released: 1998
- Genre: Country
- Length: 3:48
- Label: Reprise
- Songwriters: Paul Brandt; Steve Rosen
- Producer: Josh Leo

Paul Brandt singles chronology
"Yeah!" (1998)	"Outside the Frame" (1998)	"That's the Truth" (1999)

"Outside the Frame" is a song recorded by Canadian country music artist Paul Brandt. It was released in 1998 as the fourth single from his second studio album, Outside the Frame. It peaked at number 3 on the RPM Country Tracks chart in November 1998.

== Chart performance ==
Chart (1998)	Peak position
Canada Country Singles (RPM)	3

=== Year-end charts ===
Chart (1998)	Position
Canada Country Tracks (RPM)	36
