= Yeah! (Paul Brandt song) =

Single by Paul Brandt

from the album Outside the Frame
- Released: April 14, 1998
- Genre: Country
- Length: 4:13
- Label: Reprise
- Songwriters: Paul Brandt; Steve Rosen
- Producer: Josh Leo

Paul Brandt singles chronology
"What's Come Over You" (1997)	"Yeah!" (1998)	"Outside the Frame" (1998)

"Yeah!" is a song recorded by Canadian country music artist Paul Brandt. It was released in 1998 as the third single from his second studio album, Outside the Frame. It peaked at number 5 on the RPM Country Tracks chart in June 1998.

== Chart performance ==
Chart (1998)	Peak position
Canada Country Singles (RPM)	5

=== Year-end charts ===
Chart (1998)	Position
Canada Country Tracks (RPM)	10
