= List of number-one country albums of 1979 (Canada) =

Best country music albums in Canada

These are the Canadian number-one country albums of 1979, per the RPM Country Albums chart.

Issue date	Album	Artist
January 13	I've Always Been Crazy	Waylon Jennings
January 20	I've Always Been Crazy	Waylon Jennings
January 27	Expressions	Don Williams
February 3	Expressions	Don Williams
February 10	The Gambler	Kenny Rogers
February 17	The Gambler	Kenny Rogers
February 24	The Gambler	Kenny Rogers
March 3	The Gambler	Kenny Rogers
March 10	The Gambler	Kenny Rogers
March 17	The Gambler	Kenny Rogers
March 24	Let's Keep It That Way	Anne Murray
March 31	Let's Keep It That Way	Anne Murray
April 7	Every Which Way but Loose	Soundtrack
April 14	Every Which Way but Loose	Soundtrack
April 21	Every Which Way but Loose	Soundtrack
April 28	Every Which Way but Loose	Soundtrack
May 5	Every Which Way but Loose	Soundtrack
May 12	Every Which Way but Loose	Soundtrack
May 19	Every Which Way but Loose	Soundtrack
May 26	Every Which Way but Loose	Soundtrack
June 2	Every Which Way but Loose	Soundtrack
June 9	Conway	Conway Twitty
June 16	Just Like Real People	The Kendalls
June 23	Willie and Family Live	Willie Nelson
June 30	The Oak Ridge Boys Have Arrived	The Oak Ridge Boys
July 7	Our Memories of Elvis	Elvis Presley
July 14	Greatest Hits	Waylon Jennings
July 21	Greatest Hits	Waylon Jennings
July 28	Greatest Hits	Waylon Jennings
August 4	Cross Winds	Conway Twitty
August 11	New Kind of Feeling	Anne Murray
August 18	The Gambler	Kenny Rogers
August 25	Cross Winds	Conway Twitty
September 1	Cross Winds	Conway Twitty
September 8	The Gambler	Kenny Rogers
September 15	The Gambler	Kenny Rogers
September 22	The Gambler	Kenny Rogers
September 29	One for the Road	Willie Nelson and Leon Russell
October 6	Serving 190 Proof	Merle Haggard
October 13	Great Balls of Fire	Dolly Parton
October 20	Greatest Hits	Waylon Jennings
October 27	Kenny	Kenny Rogers
November 3	Kenny	Kenny Rogers
November 10	Kenny	Kenny Rogers
November 17	Kenny	Kenny Rogers
November 24	Kenny	Kenny Rogers
December 1	Kenny	Kenny Rogers
December 8	Kenny	Kenny Rogers
December 15	Kenny	Kenny Rogers
December 22	I'll Always Love You	Anne Murray
December 29	I'll Always Love You	Anne Murray
