= The Journey YYC, Vol. 1 =

EP by Paul Brandt
- Released: April 6, 2018
- Recorded: 2017–2018
- Genre: Country
- Length: 21:12
- Label: Brand-T Records; Warner Music Canada
- Producer: Paul Brandt, Ben Fowler

Paul Brandt chronology
| Borderlines (2015) | The Journey YYC, Vol. 1 (2018) | The Journey BNA, Vol. 2 (2018) |

Singles from The Journey YYC, Vol. 1
- 1. "The Journey" Released: August 2017; 2. "All About Her" Released: March 6, 2018

Professional ratings
Review scores
| Source | Rating |
|---|---|
| Exclaim! | 8/10 |

The Journey YYC, Vol. 1 is the second extended play by Canadian country artist Paul Brandt, released on April 6, 2018. The EP is the first part of a two-part series with the second volume The Journey BNA, Vol. 2 being released in November 2018. Brandt debuted the extended play live at a CBC Music "First Play Live" event in Toronto, Ontario in April 2018.

== Background ==
Brandt conceived the idea of the two-part extended play series while on a motorcycle trip along the Pacific Coast Highway in California. He thought of it as a reverse concept of his past hit "Alberta Bound", starting with him conceptually in Calgary, Alberta (YYC), before progressing to Nashville, Tennessee (BNA) for the second volume.

== Track listing ==
Adapted from AllMusic.
| No. | Title | Writer(s) | Length |
|---|---|---|---|
| 1. | "The Journey" | Paul Brandt | 3:26 |
| 2. | "All About Her" | Brandt, Seth Mosley, Ben Stennis | 2:47 |
| 3. | "Better Country" | Brandt, Doug Romanow | 3:27 |
| 4. | "Thank You, Thank You" | Brandt | 3:59 |
| 5. | "YYC BNA" | Brandt | 3:39 |
| 6. | "Slow Down" | Nichole Nordeman, Christopher Stevens | 3:54 |
| Total length: | | | 21:12 |

== Personnel ==
Adapted from AllMusic.

- Liz Brandt - background vocals
- Paul Brandt - lead vocals, production, songwriting, composing
- Jimmy Carter - bass guitar
- Court Clement - electric guitar
- J.T. Corenflos - electric guitar
- Elenore Denig - strings
- Richard Dodd - mastering
- Dan Dugmore - guitar
- Ben Fowler - mixing, production
- Cara Fox - strings
- Vicki Hampton - background vocals
- Mark Hill - bass guitar
- Charles Judge - keyboard, synthesizer
- Trey Keller - background vocals
- Joel Key - guitar, acoustic guitar
- Todd Lombardo - banjo, dobro, guitar, acoustic guitar, mandolin
- Gordon Mote - keyboard, Hammond B-3 organ, piano
- Nichole Nordeman - songwriting, composing
- Mike "X" O'Connor - electric guitar, keyboard, mixing, production, programming
- Mike Payne - acoustic guitar, electric guitar
- Doug Romanow - composing, keyboards, songwriting, programming
- Ben Stennis - composing, songwriting
- Christopher Stevens - composing, songwriting
- Russell Terrell - background vocals
- Brianna Tyson - background vocals
- Scott Williamson - drums
- Nir Z - drums

== Charts ==
=== Album ===
| Chart (2018) | Peak position |
|---|---|
| Canadian Albums (Billboard) | 58 |

=== Singles ===
Chart performance for singles from The Journey YYC, Vol. 1
| Year | Single | Peak chart positions |
| Year | Single | CAN Country |
|---|---|---|
| 2018 | "The Journey" | 16 |
| 2019 | "All About Her" | 9 |
