= Outside the Frame =

Studio album by Paul Brandt
- Released: November 11, 1997
- Recorded: 1997, Emerald Sound Studios
- Genre: Country
- Length: 35:18
- Label: Reprise
- Producer: Josh Leo

Paul Brandt chronology
Calm Before the Storm (1996)	Outside the Frame (1997)	A Paul Brandt Christmas: Shall I Play for You? (1998)

Professional ratings
Review scores
Source	Rating
Allmusic	4/5 stars

Outside the Frame is the second album by Canadian country music singer Paul Brandt. The album has been certified Platinum by the CRIA. The album's four singles — "A Little in Love", "What's Come Over You", "Yeah!", and "Outside the Frame" — all charted in the top ten on the Canadian RPM Country Tracks charts, where they reached #1, #10, #5, and #3, respectively. None of these were Top 40 hits in the U.S., however.

== Track listing ==
1. "Chain Reaction" (Paul Brandt, Josh Leo, Rick Bowles) - 2:39
2. "A Little in Love" (Leo, Bowles) - 3:37
3. "What's Come Over You" (Gene Nelson, Doug Swander) - 3:29
4. "One" (Brandt, Kerry Chater, Lynn Gillespie Chater) - 3:36
5. "I Believe You" (Bob DiPiero, Tom Shapiro) - 3:29
6. "Yeah!" (Brandt, Steve Rosen) - 4:13
7. "We Are the One" (Brandt) - 2:50
  - feat. Kathy Mattea on background vocals
8. "Start Forever Over Again" (Brandt, Max D. Barnes) - 3:42
9. "Dry Eye" (Brandt, Leo, Bowles) - 3:55
10. "Outside the Frame" (Brandt, Rosen) - 3:48

== Personnel ==
As listed in liner notes.

- Richard Bennett - acoustic guitar, electric guitar
- Liz Brandt - background vocals
- Paul Brandt - lead vocals, electric guitar
- Max Carl - background vocals
- John Catchings - cello
- Bill Cuomo - synthesizer
- Dan Dugmore - steel guitar
- Connie Ellisor - violin
- Larry Franklin - fiddle
- Rob Hajacos - fiddle
- Vicki Hampton - background vocals
- John Hobbs - keyboards, Hammond B-3 organ, Wurlitzer
- Dann Huff - electric guitar
- Greg Jennings - slide guitar
- Jeff King - electric guitar
- Josh Leo - electric guitar
- Carl Marsh - keyboards
- Brent Mason - electric guitar
- Kathy Mattea - background vocals on "We Are the One"
- Greg Morrow - drums, percussion
- Steve Rosen - keyboards
- Harry Stinson - background vocals
- Biff Watson - acoustic guitar
- Lonnie Wilson - drums
- Glenn Worf - bass guitar

== Chart performance ==
Chart (1997)	Peak position
Canadian RPM Country Albums	1
Canadian RPM Top Albums	39
U.S. Billboard Top Country Albums	50
U.S. Billboard Top Heatseekers	49

== References and external links ==
- allmusic.com
