= List of number-one country albums of 1980 (Canada) =

These are the Canadian number-one country albums of 1980, per the RPM Country Albums chart.

Issue date	Album	Artist
January 12	Kenny	Kenny Rogers
January 19	Kenny	Kenny Rogers
January 26	Kenny	Kenny Rogers
February 2	Kenny	Kenny Rogers
February 9	Kenny	Kenny Rogers
February 16	Kenny	Kenny Rogers
February 23	I'll Always Love You	Anne Murray
March 1	I'll Always Love You	Anne Murray
March 8	I'll Always Love You	Anne Murray
March 15	Kenny	Kenny Rogers
March 22	Kenny	Kenny Rogers
March 29	Sings Kristofferson	Willie Nelson
April 5	Sings Kristofferson	Willie Nelson
April 12	Sings Kristofferson	Willie Nelson
April 19	Kenny	Kenny Rogers
April 26	Together	The Oak Ridge Boys
May 3	Together	The Oak Ridge Boys
May 10	Coal Miner's Daughter	Soundtrack
May 17	Coal Miner's Daughter	Soundtrack
May 24	Coal Miner's Daughter	Soundtrack
May 31	Coal Miner's Daughter	Soundtrack
June 7	Together	The Oak Ridge Boys
June 14	Together	The Oak Ridge Boys
June 21	Gideon	Kenny Rogers
June 28	Somebody's Waiting	Anne Murray
July 5	Somebody's Waiting	Anne Murray
July 12	Dream Street Rose	Gordon Lightfoot
July 19	Music Man	Waylon Jennings
July 26	Music Man	Waylon Jennings
August 2	Music Man	Waylon Jennings
August 9	San Antonio Rose	Willie Nelson and Ray Price
August 16	Dolly, Dolly, Dolly	Dolly Parton
August 23	Somebody's Waiting	Anne Murray
August 30	Somebody's Waiting	Anne Murray
September 6	Somebody's Waiting	Anne Murray
September 13	San Antonio Rose	Willie Nelson and Ray Price
September 27	San Antonio Rose	Willie Nelson and Ray Price
October 11	Dolly, Dolly, Dolly	Dolly Parton
October 25	My Home's in Alabama	Alabama
November 8	Somebody's Waiting	Anne Murray
November 22	Somebody's Waiting	Anne Murray
December 6	Somebody's Waiting	Anne Murray
