= Just as I Am (Paul Brandt album) =

Just As I Am

Studio album by Paul Brandt
- Released: October 16, 2012
- Studio: Ocean Way Studios
- Genre: Country, gospel
- Length: 47:14
- Label: Brand-T Records
- Producer: Paul Brandt, Steve Rosen

Paul Brandt chronology
Give It Away (2011)	Just As I Am (2012)

Just As I Am is the seventh studio album by Canadian country music artist Paul Brandt. It was released on Brandt's record label, Brand-T Records. The album is distinct among Brandt's work as it is wholly focused on interpretations of Christian music.

== Track listing ==
No.	Title	Length
1.	"Jesus Loves Me"	1:05
2.	"Amazing Grace" (featuring Patty Loveless)	5:49
3.	"Life's Railway to Heaven" (featuring Ricky Skaggs and The Whites)	4:14
4.	"Flee As a Bird" (featuring Dan Tyminski)	3:12
5.	"The Old Rugged Cross" (featuring The Isaacs)	3:47
6.	"I'll Fly Away" (featuring John Anderson)	3:32
7.	"Why Me" (featuring Liz Brandt)	3:50
8.	"When The Roll Is Called Up Yonder" (featuring High Valley)	2:50
9.	"It Is Well with My Soul" (featuring Jon Randall Stewart)	6:04
10.	"I Come to the Garden Alone" (featuring Liz Brandt)	4:40
11.	"Just As I Am"	3:57
12.	"How Great Thou Art"	4:14
