= List of number-one country albums of 2000 (Canada) =

Best country music albums in Canada

These are the Canadian number-one country albums of 2000, per the RPM Country Albums chart.

Issue date	Album	Artist	Ref.
January 10	Come on Over	Shania Twain	
January 17	Come on Over	Shania Twain	
January 24	Come on Over	Shania Twain	
January 31	Come on Over	Shania Twain	
February 7	Come on Over	Shania Twain	
February 14	Come on Over	Shania Twain	
February 21	Come on Over	Shania Twain	
February 28	Come on Over	Shania Twain	
March 6	Come on Over	Shania Twain	
March 13	Come on Over	Shania Twain	
March 20	Come on Over	Shania Twain	
March 27	Come on Over	Shania Twain	
April 3	Come on Over	Shania Twain	
April 10	Come on Over	Shania Twain	
April 17	Come on Over	Shania Twain	
April 24	Come on Over	Shania Twain	
May 1	Come on Over	Shania Twain	
May 8	Come on Over	Shania Twain	
May 15	Come on Over	Shania Twain	
May 22	Come on Over	Shania Twain	
May 29	Fly	Dixie Chicks	
June 5	Fly	Dixie Chicks	
June 12	Breathe	Faith Hill	
June 19	Breathe	Faith Hill	
June 26	Fly	Dixie Chicks	
July 3	Breathe	Faith Hill	
July 10	Breathe	Faith Hill	
July 17	Breathe	Faith Hill	
July 24	Breathe	Faith Hill	
July 31	Breathe	Faith Hill	
August 7	Fly	Dixie Chicks	
August 14	Fly	Dixie Chicks	
August 21	Burn	Jo Dee Messina	
August 28	Burn	Jo Dee Messina	
September 4	Breathe	Faith Hill	
September 11	Coyote Ugly	Soundtrack	
September 18	Coyote Ugly	Soundtrack	
September 25	Coyote Ugly	Soundtrack	
October 2	Coyote Ugly	Soundtrack	
October 9	Coyote Ugly	Soundtrack	
October 6	Coyote Ugly	Soundtrack	
October 23	Coyote Ugly	Soundtrack	
October 30	Coyote Ugly	Soundtrack	
November 6	Coyote Ugly	Soundtrack	
