= List of number-one country albums of 1978 (Canada) =

Number-one country music albums in Canada

These are the Canadian number-one country albums of 1978, per the RPM Country Albums chart.

Issue date	Album	Artist	Ref.
August 19	Let's Keep It That Way	Anne Murray	
August 26	Stardust	Willie Nelson	
September 2	When I Dream	Crystal Gayle	
September 9	Stardust	Willie Nelson	
September 16	Stardust	Willie Nelson	
September 23	Heartbreaker	Dolly Parton	
October 7	Let's Keep It That Way	Anne Murray	
October 14	Elvis Sings for Children and Grownups Too	Elvis Presley	
October 21	Elvis Sings for Children and Grownups Too	Elvis Presley	
October 28	Elvis Sings for Children and Grownups Too	Elvis Presley	
November 18	Elvis: A Canadian Tribute	Elvis Presley	
November 25	Elvis: A Canadian Tribute	Elvis Presley	
December 2	Elvis: A Canadian Tribute	Elvis Presley	
December 9	Elvis: A Canadian Tribute	Elvis Presley	
December 16	Elvis: A Canadian Tribute	Elvis Presley	
December 23	Elvis: A Canadian Tribute	Elvis Presley	
December 30	Elvis: A Canadian Tribute	Elvis Presley	
