= I Meant to Do That =

Single by Paul Brandt

from the album Calm Before the Storm
- B-side: "All Over Me"
- Released: November 1996
- Genre: Country
- Length: 3:28
- Label: Reprise
- Songwriters: Paul Brandt; Lynn Gillespie Chater; Kerry Chater
- Producer: Josh Leo

Paul Brandt singles chronology
"I Do" (1996)	"I Meant to Do That" (1996)	"Take It from Me" (1997)

"I Meant to Do That" is a song co-written and recorded by Canadian country music artist Paul Brandt. It was released in November 1996 as the third single from his debut album Calm Before the Storm. The song reached number 39 on the Billboard Hot Country Singles & Tracks chart and number 1 on the Canadian RPM Country Tracks chart. It was written by Brandt, Kerry Chater and Lynn Gillespie Chater.

== Chart performance ==
Chart (1996–1997)	Peak position
Canada Country Singles (RPM)	1
US Hot Country Songs (Billboard)	39

=== Year-end charts ===
Chart (1997)	Position
Canada Country Tracks (RPM)	59
