= Didn't Even See the Dust =

Single by Paul Brandt

from the album Risk
- Released: May 2007
- Genre: Country
- Length: 4:49
- Label: Brand-T Records
- Songwriters: Paul Brandt, Steve Rosen
- Producers: Paul Brandt, Steve Rosen

Paul Brandt singles chronology
"Christmas Convoy" (2006)	"Didn't Even See the Dust" (2007)	"Come On and Get Some" (2007)

"Didn't Even See the Dust" is a song co-written and recorded by Canadian country music artist Paul Brandt. It was released in May 2007 as the first single from his 2007 album Risk. It reached number 31 at Canadian Hot 100 Chart.

== Music video ==
The music video was directed by Joel Stewart and premiered in May 2007.

== Chart positions ==
Chart (2007)	Peak position
Canada Hot 100 (Billboard)	31
Canada Country (Billboard)	3
