= List of number-one country albums of 1995 (Canada) =

Best country music albums in Canada

These are the Canadian number-one country albums of 1995, per the RPM Country Albums chart.

Issue date	Album	Artist
January 9	The Hits	Garth Brooks
January 16	The Hits	Garth Brooks
January 23	The Hits	Garth Brooks
January 30	The Hits	Garth Brooks
February 6	Stones in the Road	Mary Chapin Carpenter
February 13	The Hits	Garth Brooks
February 20	Read My Mind	Reba McEntire
February 27	The Hits	Garth Brooks
March 6	The Hits	Garth Brooks
March 13	The Hits	Garth Brooks
March 20	If I Could Make a Living	Clay Walker
March 27	The Hits	Garth Brooks
April 3	If I Could Make a Living	Clay Walker
April 10	The Hits	Garth Brooks
April 17	The Woman in Me	Shania Twain
April 24	The Hits	Garth Brooks
May 1	This Child	Susan Aglukark
May 8	New Country 2	Various Artists
May 15	New Country 2	Various Artists
May 22	The Woman in Me	Shania Twain
May 29	The Woman in Me	Shania Twain
June 5	The Woman in Me	Shania Twain
June 12	The Woman in Me	Shania Twain
June 19	The Woman in Me	Shania Twain
June 26	The Woman in Me	Shania Twain
July 3	The Woman in Me	Shania Twain
July 10	The Woman in Me	Shania Twain
July 17	The Woman in Me	Shania Twain
July 24	The Woman in Me	Shania Twain
July 31	The Hits	Garth Brooks
August 7	The Hits	Garth Brooks
August 14	The Hits	Garth Brooks
August 21	The Hits	Garth Brooks
August 28	John Michael Montgomery	John Michael Montgomery
September 4	John Michael Montgomery	John Michael Montgomery
September 11	The Woman in Me	Shania Twain
September 18	The Woman in Me	Shania Twain
September 25	The Woman in Me	Shania Twain
October 2	All I Want	Tim McGraw
October 9	All I Want	Tim McGraw
October 16	The Woman in Me	Shania Twain
October 23	The Woman in Me	Shania Twain
October 30	Now That I've Found You: A Collection	Alison Krauss & Union Station
November 6	Starting Over	Reba McEntire
November 13	Starting Over	Reba McEntire
November 20	The Greatest Hits Collection	Alan Jackson
November 27	Fresh Horses	Garth Brooks
December 4	Fresh Horses	Garth Brooks
December 11	Fresh Horses	Garth Brooks
December 18	Fresh Horses	Garth Brooks
