= Take It from Me (Paul Brandt song) =

Single by Paul Brandt

from the album Calm Before the Storm
- B-side: "12 Step Recovery"
- Released: March 1997
- Genre: Country
- Length: 3:26
- Label: Reprise
- Songwriters: Paul Brandt; Roy Hurd
- Producer: Josh Leo

Paul Brandt singles chronology
"I Meant to Do That" (1996)	"Take It from Me" (1997)	"A Little in Love" (1997)

"Take It from Me" is a song co-written and recorded by Canadian country music artist Paul Brandt. It was released in March 1997 as the fourth and final single from his album Calm Before the Storm. The song reached number 38 on the Billboard Hot Country Singles & Tracks chart and number 1 on the Canadian RPM Country Tracks chart. It was written by Brandt and Roy Hurd.

== Chart performance ==
Chart (1997)	Peak position
Canada Country Singles (RPM)	1
US Hot Country Songs (Billboard)	38

=== Year-end charts ===
Chart (1997)	Position
Canada Country Tracks (RPM)	15
