= List of number-one country albums of 1984 (Canada) =

These are the Canadian number-one country albums of 1984, per the RPM Country Albums chart.

Issue date	Album	Artist
August 4	Don't Cheat in Our Hometown	Ricky Skaggs
August 11	Don't Cheat in Our Hometown	Ricky Skaggs
August 18	Cafe Carolina	Don Williams
