= A Little in Love (Paul Brandt song) =

Single by Paul Brandt

from the album Outside the Frame
- Released: October 2, 1997
- Recorded: 1997
- Genre: Country
- Length: 3:26
- Label: Reprise
- Songwriters: Josh Leo; Rick Bowles
- Producer: Josh Leo

Paul Brandt singles chronology
"Take It From Me" (1997)	"A Little in Love" (1997)	"What's Come Over You" (1997)

"A Little in Love" is a song co-written and recorded by Canadian country music artist Paul Brandt for his 1997 album Outside the Frame. It was released as the first single from that album, where it reached number 45 on the Billboard Hot Country Singles & Tracks chart and number 1 on the Canadian RPM Country Tracks chart.

== Chart performance ==
Chart (1997–1998)	Peak position
Canada Country Singles (RPM)	1
US Hot Country Songs (Billboard)	45

=== Year-end charts ===
Chart (1997)	Position
Canada Country Tracks (RPM)	40
