= List of number-one country albums of 1998 (Canada) =

Best country music albums in Canada

These are the Canadian number-one country albums of 1998, per the RPM Country Albums chart.

Issue date	Album	Artist
January 12	Sevens	Garth Brooks
January 19	Sevens	Garth Brooks
January 26	Come on Over	Shania Twain
February 2	Come on Over	Shania Twain
February 9	Come on Over	Shania Twain
February 16	Come on Over	Shania Twain
February 23	Come on Over	Shania Twain
March 2	Come on Over	Shania Twain
March 9	Sevens	Garth Brooks
March 16	Sevens	Garth Brooks
March 23	Sevens	Garth Brooks
March 30	Come on Over	Shania Twain
April 6	Come on Over	Shania Twain
April 13	Come on Over	Shania Twain
April 20	Come on Over	Shania Twain
April 27	Come on Over	Shania Twain
May 4	Come on Over	Shania Twain
May 11	Faith	Faith Hill
May 18	Come on Over	Shania Twain
May 25	Come on Over	Shania Twain
June 1	Come on Over	Shania Twain
June 8	Come on Over	Shania Twain
June 15	The Limited Series	Garth Brooks
June 22	Come on Over	Shania Twain
June 29	Come on Over	Shania Twain
July 6	Come on Over	Shania Twain
July 13	Come on Over	Shania Twain
July 20	Come on Over	Shania Twain
July 27	Come on Over	Shania Twain
August 3	Come on Over	Shania Twain
August 10	Come on Over	Shania Twain
August 17	Come on Over	Shania Twain
August 24	Come on Over	Shania Twain
August 31	Come on Over	Shania Twain
September 7	Come on Over	Shania Twain
September 14	Come on Over	Shania Twain
September 21	Come on Over	Shania Twain
September 28	Come on Over	Shania Twain
October 5	Come on Over	Shania Twain
October 12	Come on Over	Shania Twain
October 19	High Mileage	Alan Jackson
October 26	High Mileage	Alan Jackson
November 2	Come on Over	Shania Twain
November 9	Tammy Wynette Remembered	Various Artists
November 16	Tammy Wynette Remembered	Various Artists
November 23	Tammy Wynette Remembered	Various Artists
November 30	Double Live	Garth Brooks
December 7	Double Live	Garth Brooks
December 14	Double Live	Garth Brooks
