= List of number-one country albums of 1994 (Canada) =

Best country music albums in Canada

These are the Canadian number-one country albums of 1994, per the RPM Country Albums chart.

Issue date	Album	Artist'
January 10	The Other Side	Charlie Major
January 17	In Pieces	Garth Brooks
January 24	Clay Walker	Clay Walker
January 31	Clay Walker	Clay Walker
February 7	Common Thread: The Songs of the Eagles	Various Artists
February 14	Common Thread: The Songs of the Eagles	Various Artists
February 21	Common Thread: The Songs of the Eagles	Various Artists
February 28	Kickin' It Up	John Michael Montgomery
March 7	Kickin' It Up	John Michael Montgomery
March 14	Kickin' It Up	John Michael Montgomery
March 21	Kickin' It Up	John Michael Montgomery
March 28	Kickin' It Up	John Michael Montgomery
April 4	New Country	Various Artists
April 11	New Country	Various Artists
April 18	No Doubt About It	Neal McCoy
April 25	No Doubt About It	Neal McCoy
May 2	New Country	Various Artists
May 9	Rhythm, Country and Blues	Various Artists
May 16	Rhythm, Country and Blues	Various Artists
May 23	Rhythm, Country and Blues	Various Artists
May 30	Rhythm, Country and Blues	Various Artists
June 6	Not a Moment Too Soon	Tim McGraw
June 13	Not a Moment Too Soon	Tim McGraw
June 20	Not a Moment Too Soon	Tim McGraw
June 27	Not a Moment Too Soon	Tim McGraw
July 4	Country Heat 4	Various Artists
July 11	Country Heat 4	Various Artists
July 18	John Berry	John Berry
July 25	Who I Am	Alan Jackson
August 1	Who I Am	Alan Jackson
August 8	Who I Am	Alan Jackson
August 15	Who I Am	Alan Jackson
August 22	Who I Am	Alan Jackson
August 29	Who I Am	Alan Jackson
September 5	Maverick (soundtrack)	Various Artists
September 12	Maverick (soundtrack)	Various Artists
September 19	Kickin' It Up	John Michael Montgomery
September 26	Kickin' It Up	John Michael Montgomery
October 3	Who I Am	Alan Jackson
October 10	In Pieces	Garth Brooks
October 17	In Pieces	Garth Brooks
October 24	Not a Moment Too Soon	Tim McGraw
October 31	Stones in the Road	Mary Chapin Carpenter
November 7	Stones in the Road	Mary Chapin Carpenter
November 14	Waitin' on Sundown	Brooks & Dunn
November 21	Waitin' on Sundown	Brooks & Dunn
November 28	The Tractors	The Tractors
December 5	The Tractors	The Tractors
December 12	Waitin' on Sundown	Brooks & Dunn
December 19	Waitin' on Sundown	Brooks & Dunn
