= List of number-one country albums of 1992 (Canada) =

Best country music albums in Canada

These are the Canadian number-one country albums of 1992, per the RPM Country Albums chart.

Issue date	Album	Artist
April 18	Ropin' the Wind	Garth Brooks
April 25	For My Broken Heart	Reba McEntire
May 2	Wynonna	Wynonna
May 9	Wynonna	Wynonna
May 16	Wynonna	Wynonna
May 23	Wynonna	Wynonna
May 30	For My Broken Heart	Reba McEntire
June 6	Wynonna	Wynonna
June 13	Wynonna	Wynonna
June 20	Some Gave All	Billy Ray Cyrus
June 27	Some Gave All	Billy Ray Cyrus
July 4	Some Gave All	Billy Ray Cyrus
July 11	Some Gave All	Billy Ray Cyrus
July 18	Some Gave All	Billy Ray Cyrus
July 25	Some Gave All	Billy Ray Cyrus
August 1	Some Gave All	Billy Ray Cyrus
August 8	Some Gave All	Billy Ray Cyrus
August 15	Some Gave All	Billy Ray Cyrus
August 22	Some Gave All	Billy Ray Cyrus
August 29	Some Gave All	Billy Ray Cyrus
September 5	Some Gave All	Billy Ray Cyrus
September 12	Some Gave All	Billy Ray Cyrus
September 19	Some Gave All	Billy Ray Cyrus
September 26	Some Gave All	Billy Ray Cyrus
October 3	Some Gave All	Billy Ray Cyrus
October 10	More Country Heat	Various Artists
October 17	The Chase	Garth Brooks
October 24	The Chase	Garth Brooks
October 31	The Chase	Garth Brooks
November 7	Some Gave All	Billy Ray Cyrus
November 14	Some Gave All	Billy Ray Cyrus
November 21	Some Gave All	Billy Ray Cyrus
November 28	The Chase	Garth Brooks
December 5	The Chase	Garth Brooks
December 12	The Chase	Garth Brooks
December 19	The Chase	Garth Brooks
December 26	Pure Country	George Strait
