= List of number-one country albums of 1993 (Canada) =

Best country music albums in Canada

These are the Canadian number-one country albums of 1993, per the RPM Country Albums chart.

Issue date	Album	Artist
January 16	Some Gave All	Billy Ray Cyrus
January 23	Some Gave All	Billy Ray Cyrus
January 30	Some Gave All	Billy Ray Cyrus
February 6	Some Gave All	Billy Ray Cyrus
February 13	Some Gave All	Billy Ray Cyrus
February 20	Some Gave All	Billy Ray Cyrus
February 27	Big Iron Horses	Restless Heart
March 6	Big Iron Horses	Restless Heart
March 13	It's Your Call	Reba McEntire
March 20	It's Your Call	Reba McEntire
March 27	Fare Thee Well Love	The Rankin Family
April 3	Fare Thee Well Love	The Rankin Family
April 10	Hard Workin' Man	Brooks & Dunn
April 17	This Time	Dwight Yoakam
April 24	This Time	Dwight Yoakam
May 1	This Time	Dwight Yoakam
May 8	This Time	Dwight Yoakam
May 15	Some Gave All	Billy Ray Cyrus
May 22	Some Gave All	Billy Ray Cyrus
May 29	Fare Thee Well Love	The Rankin Family
June 5	Fare Thee Well Love	The Rankin Family
June 12	Fare Thee Well Love	The Rankin Family
June 19	Country Heat 3	Various Artists
June 26	Country Heat 3	Various Artists
July 3	Country Heat 3	Various Artists
July 10	Country Heat 3	Various Artists
July 17	Country Heat 3	Various Artists
July 24	Country Heat 3	Various Artists
July 31	It Won't Be the Last	Billy Ray Cyrus
August 7	It Won't Be the Last	Billy Ray Cyrus
August 14	It Won't Be the Last	Billy Ray Cyrus
August 21	It Won't Be the Last	Billy Ray Cyrus
August 28	It Won't Be the Last	Billy Ray Cyrus
September 4	It Won't Be the Last	Billy Ray Cyrus
September 11	Croonin'	Anne Murray
September 18	Croonin'	Anne Murray
September 25	In Pieces	Garth Brooks
October 2	In Pieces	Garth Brooks
October 9	In Pieces	Garth Brooks
October 16	In Pieces	Garth Brooks
October 23	In Pieces	Garth Brooks
October 30	In Pieces	Garth Brooks
November 6	In Pieces	Garth Brooks
November 13	In Pieces	Garth Brooks
November 20	Common Thread: The Songs of the Eagles	Various Artists
November 27	Common Thread: The Songs of the Eagles	Various Artists
December 4	North Country	The Rankin Family
December 11	Common Thread: The Songs of the Eagles	Various Artists
December 18	Common Thread: The Songs of the Eagles	Various Artists
December 25	Common Thread: The Songs of the Eagles	Various Artists
