= List of number-one country albums of 1989 (Canada) =

These are the Canadian number-one country albums of 1989, per the RPM Country Albums chart.

Issue date	Album	Artist
June 5	Old 8×10	Randy Travis
June 12	Loving Proof	Ricky Van Shelton
June 19	River of Time	The Judds
June 26	Sweet Sixteen	Reba McEntire
July 3	Sweet Sixteen	Reba McEntire
July 10	Sweet Sixteen	Reba McEntire
July 17	Sweet Sixteen	Reba McEntire
