= Centre Street Church =

Coordinates: 51°05′17″N 114°03′21″W

- Centre Street Church
- Location: 3900 2nd Street NE; Calgary, Alberta; T2E 9C1
- Denomination: Evangelical
- Website: cschurch.ca

History
- Founded: 1958
- Founder: Rev. F.W. Snyder
- Events: 4120 Centre Street NE, Calgary, Alberta (1958-2004)

Architecture
- Functional status: Active
- Architect: Woods Parker Architects
- Groundbreaking: 2002
- Completed: April 2004
- Construction cost: $15 million

Specifications
- Capacity: 3,300

Centre Street Church is an evangelical Christian multi-site megachurch based in Calgary, Alberta, Canada, affiliated with the Evangelical Missionary Church of Canada (EMCC). Founded in 1958, it has an average in-person and online weekly attendance of 9,844. In addition to its Central Campus, it has four satellite locations in the Calgary Metropolitan Region. Its senior pastor is Dr. Henry Schorr.

== History ==
Centre Street Church was founded in 1958 by 62 members of Salem Evangelical Church, a German-speaking church in the Calgary inner city neighbourhood of Bridgeland. These members founded a new English-speaking church in north Calgary; amongst the founding members was the senior pastor of Salem, Rev. F.W. Snyder. After temporarily meeting in the Highland Park Community Hall, the congregation built its first building at the corner of Centre Street and 41 Avenue NE. Its attendance plateaued at around 250.

In 1980, Henry Schorr was hired as a Youth Pastor and was later made senior pastor in 1986. Coupled with an increased focus on prayer by the church's congregants and increased growth of the city of Calgary, attendance went from 430 in the late 1980s to 4,000 congregants in 2002. After undergoing two separate building programs to construct additions on its original location, the decision was made to construct a new facility two blocks away at the site of an old drive-in movie theatre, which opened in 2004. In the 2010s, Centre Street Church satellite locations (referred to as campuses) opened in Airdrie, Bridgeland (the original site of Salem Evangelical Church), Bearspaw, and South Calgary.

During COVID-19 the main Campus (known as Central Campus) underwent an expansion. It was completed in 2023.
