= I Do (Paul Brandt song) =

Single by Paul Brandt

from the album Calm Before the Storm
- Released: July 9, 1996
- Recorded: 1995–1996
- Genre: Country
- Length: 3:39
- Label: Reprise
- Songwriter: Paul Brandt
- Producer: Josh Leo

Paul Brandt singles chronology
"My Heart Has a History" (1996)	"I Do" (1996)	"I Meant to Do That" (1996)

"I Do", also known as Robin's Song, is a song written and recorded by Canadian country music artist Paul Brandt. It was released in July 1996 as the second single from his debut album Calm Before the Storm. The song reached number 2 on the Billboard Hot Country Singles & Tracks chart, number 1 on the Mediabase Country airplay chart in the U.S., and number 1 on the Canadian RPM Country Tracks chart. It is his most successful song to date and his highest-charting song in the United States.

== Content ==
Although many claim it was written for his wife Robin (hence why it is also called Robin's Song), his wife's name is Liz and Brandt has stated he wrote the song for his friend's wedding.

== Chart performance ==
"I Do" spent two weeks at number one on the Canadian country charts beginning the week of August 26, 1996.

Chart (1996)	Peak position
Canada Country Singles (RPM)	1
US Bubbling Under Hot 100 (Billboard)	2
US Hot Country Songs (Billboard)	2

=== Year-end charts ===
Chart (1996)	Position
Canada Country Tracks (RPM)	4
US Country Songs (Billboard)	59
