= That's the Truth (Paul Brandt song) =

Single by Paul Brandt

from the album That's the Truth
- B-side: "Live It Up"
- Released: April 20, 1999
- Genre: Country
- Length: 4:38
- Label: Reprise
- Songwriters: Paul Brandt; Chris Farren
- Producer: Chris Farren

Paul Brandt singles chronology
"Outside the Frame" (1998)	"That's the Truth" (1999)	"It's a Beautiful Thing" (1999)

"That's the Truth" is a single by Canadian country music artist Paul Brandt. Released in April 1999, it was the first single from the album of the same name. The song reached #1 on the RPM Country Tracks chart in June 1999 and #47 on the Billboard Hot Country Singles & Tracks chart.

The music video won the 2000 Canadian Country Music Association award for Video of the Year.

== Chart performance ==
Chart (1999)	Peak position
Canada Country Singles (RPM)	1
US Hot Country Songs (Billboard)	47

=== Year-end charts ===
Chart (1999)	Position
Canada Country Tracks (RPM)	4
