= That's the Truth (album) =

Studio album by Paul Brandt
- Released: July 13, 1999
- Genre: Country
- Length: 39:24
- Label: Reprise
- Producer: Chris Farren

Paul Brandt chronology
A Paul Brandt Christmas: Shall I Play for You? (1997)	That's the Truth (1999)	What I Want to Be Remembered For (2000)

Professional ratings
Review scores
Source	Rating
AllMusic	3/5 stars

That's the Truth is the third studio album by Canadian country music singer Paul Brandt and is his final album to be released on Reprise Records. The album has been certified Gold by the CRIA. Four singles — "That's the Truth", "It's a Beautiful Thing", "That Hurts", and "The Sycamore Tree" — were released from the album; all but "That Hurts" charted on the Canadian RPM Country Tracks charts, where they reached numbers 1, 13, and 7, respectively. In addition, only "It's a Beautiful Thing" charted in the Top 40 in the U.S.

"It's a Beautiful Thing" was later recorded as "Love is a Beautiful Thing" by Phil Vassar in 2008, who released it as a single. Deana Carter as well as Brandt's wife Liz sang background vocals on several tracks of this album.

== Track listing ==
CD
No.	Title	Writer(s)	Length
1.	"That's the Truth"	Paul Brandt, Chris Farren	4:38
2.	"It's a Beautiful Thing"	Jeffrey Steele, Craig Wiseman	4:27
3.	"That Hurts"	Gary Burr, Gerry House	3:51
4.	"There's a World Out There"	Kent Blazy, Skip Ewing	3:42
5.	"The Sycamore Tree"	Brandt, Steve Rosen	5:19
6.	"A Love That Strong"	Reed Nielsen, Steele	3:41
7.	"Add 'Em All Up"	Rick Bowles, Brandt, Farren	2:46
8.	"Scrap Piece of Paper"	Lona Heid, Ryan Reynolds	4:00
9.	"Really and Truly"	Kent Robbins, Will Robinson, Paul Williams	3:33
10.	"Let's Live it Up"	Brian Setzer	3:23
Total length:			39:20

== Personnel ==
As listed in liner notes.

=== Musicians ===
- Shawn Allan – drum programming
- Joe Chemay – bass guitar, gang vocals
- Eric Darken – percussion
- Mark Douthit – saxophone
- Dan Dugmore – pedal steel guitar, lap steel guitar, gang vocals
- Chris Farren – acoustic guitar, mandolin, drum programming, background vocals
- Larry Franklin – fiddle, gang vocals
- Mike Haynes – trumpet
- John Hobbs – keyboards, gang vocals
- Jim Horn – saxophone
- Chris McDonald – trombone
- Terry McMillan – harmonica
- Greg Morrow – drums, gang vocals
- Tom Roady – percussion
- Brent Rowan – electric guitar, gang vocals
- Darrell Scott – acoustic guitar, mandolin, gang vocals
- Denis Solee – saxophone
- Biff Watson – acoustic guitar
- Strings arranged by Ron Huff and performed by the Nashville String Machine (Carl Gorodetxky, conductor).

=== Additional background vocals ===
- Liz Brandt
- Paul Brandt
- Tim Buppert
- Deana Carter
- LeAnn Phelan
- Marty Slayton
- Harry Stinson
- Veritas (Directed by Fred Vaughn)

== Chart performance ==
Chart (1999)	Peak position
Canadian RPM Country Albums	1
Canadian RPM Top Albums	20
U.S. Billboard Top Country Albums	56
