= My Heart Has a History =

Single by Paul Brandt

from the album Calm Before the Storm
- B-side: "Calm Before the Storm"
- Released: March 12, 1996
- Recorded: 1995
- Genre: Country
- Length: 3:22
- Label: Reprise
- Songwriters: Mark D. Sanders; Paul Brandt
- Producer: Josh Leo

Paul Brandt singles chronology
"My Heart Has a History" (1996)	"I Do" (1996)

"My Heart Has a History" is a debut song co-written and recorded by Canadian country music artist Paul Brandt. Released in March 1996 as the first single from his debut album Calm Before the Storm, it peaked at #5 on the Hot Country Singles & Tracks (now Hot Country Songs) chart, while it was a Number One on the now-defunct RPM Canadian Singles Chart. The song was written by Brandt and Mark D. Sanders.

== Chart positions ==
Chart (1996)	Peak position
Canada Country Singles (RPM)	1
US Hot Country Songs (Billboard)	5

=== Year-end charts ===
Chart (1996)	Position
US Country Songs (Billboard)	58
