= Calm Before the Storm (Paul Brandt album) =

Studio album by Paul Brandt
- Released: June 11, 1996
- Recorded: 1995–1996
- Genre: Country
- Length: 33:45
- Label: Reprise
- Producer: Josh Leo

Paul Brandt chronology
Calm Before the Storm (1996)	Outside the Frame (1997)

Professional ratings
Review scores
Source	Rating
AllMusic	4/5 stars

Calm Before the Storm is the debut studio album by Canadian country music artist Paul Brandt, released in 1996 on Reprise Records. The album has been certified 3× Platinum by the CRIA and gold by the RIAA, and is his most successful album in the United States. Its four singles — "My Heart Has a History", "I Do", "I Meant to Do That", and "Take It from Me" — were all Number One hits on the Canadian RPM Country Tracks charts. All four singles were Top 40 hits on the U.S. Billboard Hot Country Singles & Tracks (now Hot Country Songs) charts, where they reached Nos. 5, 2, 39, and 38, respectively.

"Pass Me By (If You're Only Passing Through)" is a cover of a country standard which has been recorded by several artists, including Johnny Rodriguez, who released it as a single.

== Track listing ==
No.	Title	Writer(s)	Length
1.	"My Heart Has a History"	Mark D. Sanders, Paul Brandt	3:22
2.	"Take It from Me"	Roy Hurd, Brandt	3:26
3.	"I Do (Robin's Song)"	Brandt	3:39
4.	"12 Step Recovery"	Rick Bowles, Josh Leo	3:22
5.	"I Meant to Do That"	Lynn Gillespie Chater, Kerry Chater, Brandt	3:28
6.	"One and Only One"	Bowles, Leo, Brandt	3:21
7.	"All Over Me"	Tracy Parker, Jimmy Wooten	3:04
8.	"Calm Before the Storm"	Brandt	3:31
9.	"On the Inside"	Brett Jones	3:27
10.	"Pass Me By (If You're Only Passing Through)"	Hillman Hall	3:05

== Personnel ==
- Mark Casstevens – acoustic guitar
- Chad Cromwell – drums
- Bill Cuomo – keyboards
- Sonny Garrish – pedal steel guitar
- Rob Hajacos – fiddle
- John Hobbs – keyboards
- Jeff King – electric guitar
- Josh Leo – electric guitar
- Brent Mason – electric guitar
- Gary Morse – pedal steel guitar
- Duncan Mullins – bass guitar
- Steve Nathan – keyboards
- Harry Stinson – background vocals
- Biff Watson – acoustic guitar
- Lonnie Wilson – drums
- Glenn Worf – bass guitar
- Woody Wright - background vocals
- Jonathan Yudkin – fiddle

Strings arranged by Carl Marsh.

== Charts ==
=== Weekly charts ===
Chart (1996)	Peak position
Canadian Albums (RPM)	55
Canadian Country Albums (RPM)	1
US Billboard 200	102
US Top Country Albums (Billboard)	14
US Heatseekers Albums (Billboard)	1

=== Year-end charts ===
Chart (1996)	Position
US Top Country Albums (Billboard)	54
Chart (1997)	Position
US Top Country Albums (Billboard)	67

== Certifications ==
Region	Certification	Certified units/sales
Canada (Music Canada)	3× Platinum	300,000^{^}
United States (RIAA)	Gold	500,000^{^}
^{^} Shipments figures based on certification alone.
