= Paul Brandt =

Canadian musician (born 1972)

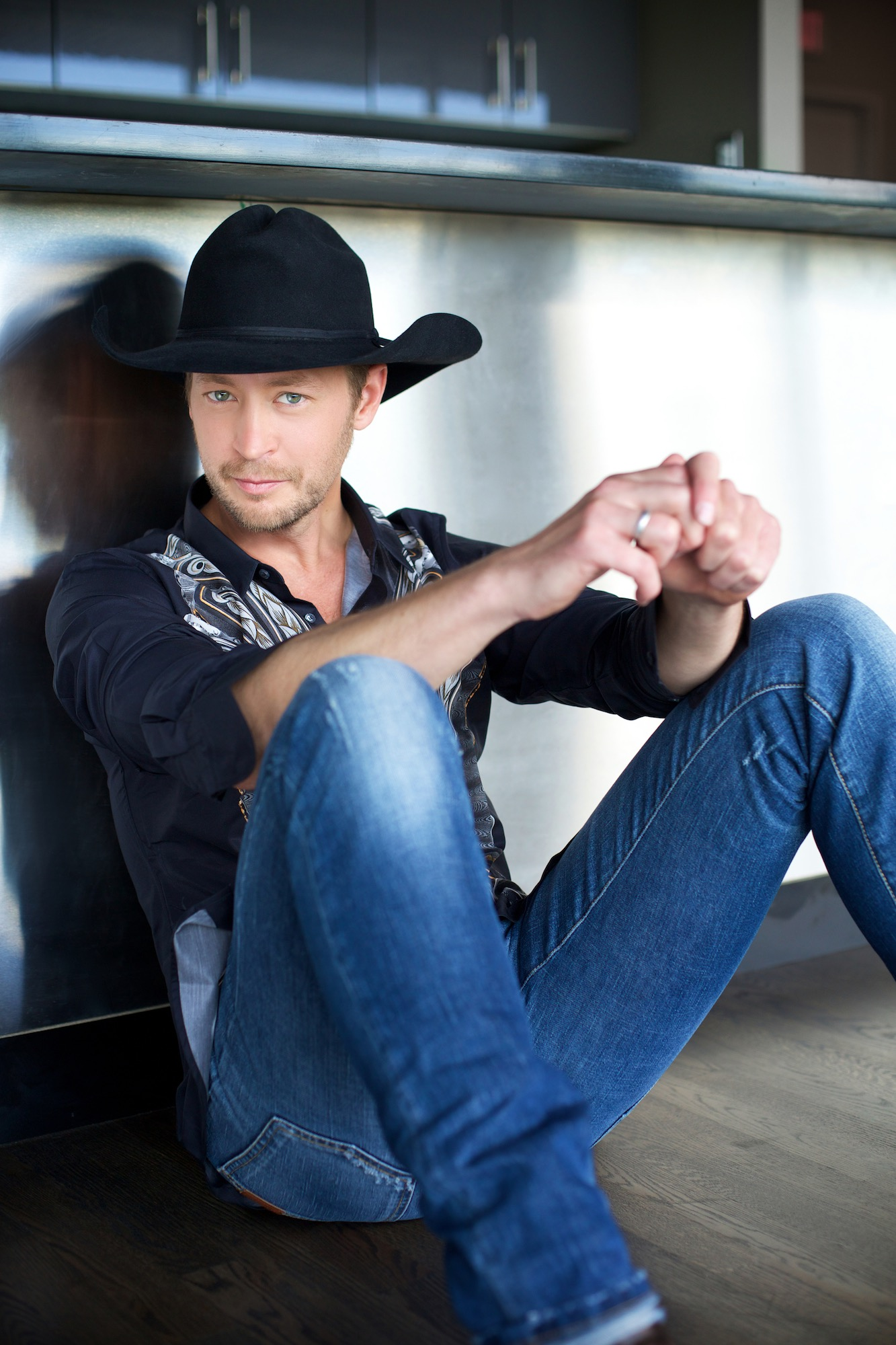
- Brandt, circa 2015

Background information
- Born: Paul Rennée Belobersycky; July 21, 1972 (age 54); Calgary, Alberta, Canada
- Origin: Airdrie, Alberta, Canada
- Genre: Country
- Occupations: Singer; songwriter
- Instruments: Vocals; guitar
- Years active: 1995–present
- Labels: Reprise; Brand-T; Orange
- Website: paulbrandt.com

Paul Rennée Belobersycky (born July 21, 1972), known professionally as Paul Brandt, is a Canadian country music artist. Growing up in Calgary, he was a pediatric nurse at the time of his big break. In 1996, he made his mark on the country music charts with the single "My Heart Has a History", propelling him to international success and making him the first male Canadian country singer to reach the top 10 on the Billboard Hot Country Songs chart in the United States since Hank Snow in 1974. His second single "I Do" reached number one on the Mediabase Country chart in the United States. Brandt achieved later success in Canada with singles such as "Canadian Man", "Alberta Bound", "Didn't Even See the Dust", and "I'm an Open Road".

== Early life ==
Brandt was born in Calgary, Alberta and grew up in nearby Airdrie. The first time Brandt sang in front of an audience was when he sang "Amazing Grace" at his high school. He attended Crescent Heights High School from 1987–1990. He also graduated from Mount Royal University with a major in nursing during 1992.

== Career ==
Brandt's demo was one of many sent by A&Rs at the Warner Canada office to their colleagues at Warner Nashville with a purpose of finding a new project that the two branches could work on together. Nashville A&R Paige Levy singled out Brandt's recordings, later mentioning to HitQuarters about his great potential as a songwriter. As a result, the artist started travelling down to Nashville to undergo development. He was matched up with various experienced songwriters whom he could relate to, work well with and who would help him to refine his writing skills. This collaborations resulted in a large part of the material for Brandt's debut album Calm Before the Storm.

Brandt's first single, "My Heart Has a History," was a number one hit in Canada, as was his debut album, Calm Before the Storm. He followed up with the three hits "I Do" (which he wrote for his friend's wedding), "I Meant to Do That" and "Take It from Me." Calm Before the Storm was certified Gold by the RIAA in 1997.

Brandt's second album, Outside the Frame, did not repeat the same success as Calm Before the Storm did. The album did have some hit singles, most notably "A Little in Love" and "What's Come Over You". Determined to put his stamp in Nashville, Brandt recorded his third album, That's the Truth, in 1999. It was not received as warmly as the previous two, but the songs "That's the Truth" and "The Sycamore Tree" became popular. After three albums, he released the Canada only greatest hits compilation, What I Want to Be Remembered For, in 2000.

After the greatest hits album, Brandt left Warner / Reprise Records and started his own label, Brand-T Records. To date, every album that Brandt has released on Brand-T Records has garnered an Album of the Year award (Small Towns and Big Dreams (2002 CCMA's), This Time Around (2005 CCMA's), Risk (2008 Juno), and A Gift (GMA – Seasonal Recording of the Year).

As an unsigned artist, his live acoustic album Small Towns and Big Dreams went on to win the CCMA Album of the Year. His label's success has continued as the follow-up album This Time Around went on to win CCMA Album of the Year and a GMA Canada Covenant Award for the song "That's What I Love About Jesus" (2005). This Time Around went platinum in Canada and also produced the hit songs "Leavin'", featuring Keith Urban, and his remake of the trucker classic song "Convoy". His last single/video from the album was "Alberta Bound", a tribute to the people and places of that province. Despite the song's name, it is not a remake of the Gordon Lightfoot track.

In September 2007, Brandt released his album, Risk. On April 6, 2008, he won a Juno Award for "Risk" as Country Recording of the Year in his home town. The first single for this project, "Didn't Even See the Dust", was released to country radio in May 2007. The video was filmed in Barcelona, Spain. "Dust" was one of the 20 most played country music songs of 2007 in Canada.

Brandt released the album Give It Away on September 13, 2011. He released his first gospel project called Just as I Am on October 16, 2012. It features songs which Brandt grew up on and based his life upon.

In 2015, Brandt released the single "I'm an Open Road" featuring Jess Moskaluke, which became his first single to be certified Gold by Music Canada. In 2018, he announced a two-part extended play series, with The Journey YYC, Vol. 1 being released in April 2018, and The Journey BNA, Vol. 2 following in November 2018.

== Personal life ==
Brandt and his wife, Elizabeth Peterson, were married on February 22, 1997, in Calgary, Alberta, Canada at the Centre Street Church, and had their first child, a son in 2008. In November 2010, they had a daughter.

Brandt received an Honorary Doctor of Fine Arts from the University of Lethbridge on Saturday, October 17, 2009. He has also received an Honorary Doctorate of Divinity from Briercrest College and Seminary on April 24, 2010.

Brandt graduated in 1992 from Mount Royal University with a degree in Nursing and currently serves as the storyteller-in-residence for the institution.

In 2019, while on tour in Lethbridge, Alberta, he requested for some shelter dogs be brought to his green room before his show. The Lethbridge and District Humane Society provided a group of puppies, one of which he adopted and named "Chief".

== Discography ==
- Calm Before the Storm (1996)
- Outside the Frame (1997)
- That's the Truth (1999)
- This Time Around (2004)
- A Gift (2006)
- Risk (2007)
- Give It Away (2011)
- Just as I Am (2012)

== Awards ==
Canadian Country Music Awards

- 1996 SOCAN Song of the Year: "My Heart Has a History"
- 1997 Male Artist of the Year
- 1997 SOCAN Song of the Year: "I Do"
- 1997 Single of the Year: "I Do"
- 1997 Video of the Year: "I Do"
- 1998 Male Artist of the Year
- 1999 Male Artist of the Year
- 2000 Male Artist of the Year
- 2000 Video of the Year: "That's the Truth"
- 2002 Male Artist of the Year
- 2002 Album of the Year: Small Towns and Big Dreams
- 2005 Album of the Year: This Time Around
- 2005 CMT Video of the Year: "Convoy"

Country Music Association

- 2005 Global Artist of the Year

CMT (United States)

- 1996 Top New Male Artist

GMA Canada Covenant Awards

- 2005 Country/Bluegrass Song of the Year: "That's What I Love About Jesus"
- 2007 Seasonal Album of the Year: A Gift
- 2007 Seasonal Song of the Year: "A Gift"
- 2008 nominee, Artist of the Year
- 2008 nominee, Male Vocalist of the Year
- 2013 Album of the Year: Just as I Am
- 2013 Artist of the Year
- 2013 Country/Bluegrass Album of the Year: Just as I Am
- 2013 nominee, Male Vocalist of the Year
- 2013 nominee (shared with High Valley): "When the Roll Is Called Up Yonder"

Juno Awards

- 1997 nominee, Male Vocalist of the Year
- 1997 Country Male Vocalist of the Year
- 1998 Male Vocalist of the Year
- 1998 Country Male Vocalist of the Year
- 1998 nominee, Best Video: "A Little In Love" (Paul Brandt and Tim Hamilton)
- 1999 Best Country Male Vocalist
- 2000 nominee, Best Male Artist
- 2000 Best Country Male Artist
- 2001 Best Country Male Artist
- 2002 nominee, Best Country Artist/Group
- 2005 nominee, Country Recording of the Year: "This Time Around"
- 2008 Country Recording of the Year: "Risk"
- 2008 Allan Waters Humanitarian Award

Western Canadian Music Awards

- 2008 Outstanding Country Recording: "Risk"

Other awards

- 2011 Alberta Music Awards Lifetime Achievement Award
- 2011 Canadian Country Album of the Year Give It Away by iTunes Rewind
- 2013 Awarded HRM the Queen's Diamond Jubilee Medal by Prime Minister Stephen Harper
- 2017 Canadian Country Music Hall of Fame
