= Scailex Corporation =

Israeli company

- Headquarters: Petah Tikva, Israel
- Key people: Ilan Ben Dov (chairman)
- Parent: Suny Electronics
- Website: www.scailex.com

Suny Cellular Communication was known as Scitex Corporation Ltd. until December 2005 and Scailex Corporation Ltd. (TASE: SCIX) until November 2016.

== History ==
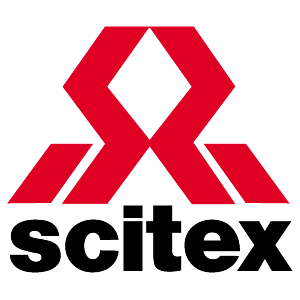
Scitex Corporation logo, used until 2005

Scitex was an Israel-based multi-national company, founded by Efraim (Efi) Arazi in 1968, and which at one stage was considered the flagship of Israeli industry. The company specialized in products, systems and equipment for the graphics design, printing and publishing markets. In 1985 it formed a joint venture company with the Continental Can Company called Contex Graphics Systems, a pioneer in two- and three-dimensional design systems based on Silicon Graphics workstations.

By the late 1990s Scitex had three principal business units: its core Scitex Graphic Arts Group, which was acquired by Creo Products Inc. in April 2000; Scitex Digital Printing, based in Dayton, Ohio, sold to Eastman Kodak Company in January 2004; and Scitex Vision, sold to Hewlett-Packard (HP) in November 2005.

From 1995–2001, the CEO and President was Yoav Chelouche.

Following the sale of Scitex Vision to HP, which included certain rights to the name "Scitex", the company changed its name on December 29, 2005 to Scailex Corporation Ltd. and has since experienced several changes in control and business activities. In August 2009, Scailex purchased the controlling share in Partner Communications, one of Israel's leading cellular phone providers, but gave up said share in 2014–2015. In 2016, Scailex was absorbed into Suny Cellular Communication, originally founded in 1994 as the Israeli official importer and distributor of Sega games, and since 1998 has mainly focused on the import, distribution, sales and marketing of Samsung Mobile devices in Israel.

== Scitex Digital Printing ==
Scitex Digital Printing, Inc. was a U.S. corporation, wholly owned by Scitex, based in Dayton, Ohio. It developed, manufactured and sold ultra high speed, computer-driven, variable-data inkjet printers. It was formerly the Dayton Operations division of Kodak, from whom Scitex purchased it in June 1993 for $70 million plus an additional amount based upon performance. It was sold back to Kodak in January 2004 for $250 million and renamed Kodak Versamark.

== Scitex Vision ==
Scitex Vision was an Israel-based company that specialized in producing equipment for large- and very-large-format printing on both paper and specialty materials. The company was incorporated as Idanit Technologies Ltd. on 19 May 1994. It was acquired by Scitex on 25 February 1998 and changed its name to Scitex Wide Format Printing Ltd. on 24 February 1998. In October 1998, its operations were expanded by the purchase of the super-wide format product line of the Matan group of companies. On 21 August 2000, it adopted the name Scitex Vision. In January 2003, Scitex Vision (100% owned by Scitex) was merged Aprion Digital Ltd. (see below, under "Minority interests") and Scitex held a 75% interest in the merged corporation, which was called Scitex Vision Ltd.

The operations of Scitex Vision, then headquartered in Netanya, Israel, together with rights to the name "Scitex" were acquired by Hewlett-Packard in November 2005 (and renamed HP Scitex).

== Minority interests ==
Scitex also held interests in a number of other corporations, including the following:

- Aprion Digital Ltd., based in Netanya, Israel, was formed in 1999 as a spin-off of Scitex's Advanced Printing Products Division, and developed drop-on-demand inkjet technologies and products. Scitex initially held an approximate 17.5% interest, which was subsequently increased to 42.5%. In January 2003, Aprion was merged with Scitex Vision Ltd. The continuing corporation, known as Scitex Vision Ltd. was 75% owned by Scitex.
- Creo Products Inc., later known as Creo, Inc, a Canadian corporation, based in Burnaby, British Columbia, was a developer, manufacturer and distributor of solutions for the graphics arts industry. Scitex acquired 28.7% of the shares in Creo in return for the sale to Creo of Scitex's graphics arts operations (digital preprint and print-on-demand systems) in April 2000, which were initially known as CreoScitex. Scitex gradually sold the shares and, in June and August 2003, it sold its remaining 6.5% stake. In 2005, Creo (including the former Scitex operations) was acquired by Eastman Kodak.
- Jemtex Ink Jet Printing Ltd., a developer and manufacturer of inkjet digital printheads and engines for the large industrial printing market, based in Lod, Israel. Scitex commenced investing in this company, as a start-up, in May 2000. In August 2006, its interest having increased to 75%, it agreed a buyout by senior management of Jemtex, thus reducing its stake in Jemtex to 15%.
- Objet Geometries Ltd., a developer and producer of three dimensional inkjet modeling applications, based in Rehovot, Israel. Scitex acquired an initial 18.7% stake in this company, a start-up, in May 2000, which stake was subsequently increased. In June 2005, it sold all its interest, then standing at 22.9%.
- RealTimeImage, or RTI, a developer of Internet-based imaging products and services for graphic arts and medical purposes, based in San Bruno, California, and Or Yehuda, Israel. Scitex first acquired an interest in RTI in December 1999, when the company was just starting. In July 2005, all the business and assets of RTI were sold to IDX Systems Corporation, at which time Scitex held a 14.9% stake.
- XMPie, a developer of software for publishing, using personalized marketing, was a Scitex spin-off, founded by Jacob Aizikowitz in 2000 and headquartered in New York City with facilities in Netanya, Israel. Scitex held an initial 19.9% stake, which was later diluted to 2.3%. In November 2006, the whole of XMPie was sold to Xerox Corporation for $54 million.
- SciDel Technologies - a company that developed a technology to insert electronic virtual advertisements into live and taped televised sporting events, which it sold as a managed service in the European market. The company was acquired by PVI Virtual Media Services in March 2002.

== See also ==
- Tapuz
- BlogTV
- Partner Communications Company
