= YouTube Awards =

Promotion that rewarded YouTubers with the best video on the platform

- Awarded for: Best YouTube videos
- Country: United States
- Presented by: YouTube
- First award: March 25, 2007
- Final award: March 21, 2008

Highlights
- Most nominations: William Sledd (2)

The YouTube Awards (also known as the YouTube Video Awards) was a promotion run by YouTube to recognize the best user-generated videos of the year. The awards were presented twice, in 2007 and 2008, with winners being voted for by the site's users from shortlists compiled by YouTube staff. YouTube was founded on February 14, 2005, and quickly began to grow – by July 2006, traffic to the site had increased by 297 percent. As a result of this success, YouTube launched its own awards promotion in March 2007 to honor some of the site's best videos. Seven shortlists were compiled, with ten videos per shortlist. Users were invited to vote for the winners over a five-day period at a dedicated web page. Singer Damian Kulash, whose band OK Go won in the Most Creative category for their music video Here It Goes Again, said that receiving a YouTube Award was a surreal honor and that the site was changing culture "quickly and completely".

The YouTube Awards returned the following year, to commemorate the best videos of 2007. That year, the number of categories was expanded from seven to twelve, while the number of videos per shortlist was reduced from ten to six. Critics noted that unlikely newcomers, such as Battle at Kruger and Stop the Clash of Civilizations by Avaaz, had triumphed over more established videos, such as I Got a Crush...On Obama and Leave Britney Alone! Reaction to the YouTube Awards was generally negative. In 2007, commentators questioned why a promotion to recognize the best videos of 2006 was taking place so late into the year, and contrasted the awards with the similar Vloggies. Attention was also drawn to the timing of the 2007 awards: five days after media conglomerate Viacom had filed a $1 billion lawsuit against YouTube for copyright infringement. Technology evangelist Don Dodge suggested that the awards were an attempt by YouTube to highlight content on their website that did not violate copyrights before the case went to trial.

== Background ==
YouTube logo, 2005–2011

YouTube was founded by Chad Hurley, Steve Chen and Jawed Karim, three former employees of PayPal. The website was activated on February 14, 2005, and quickly began to grow – in the six months to July 2006, traffic to the site grew by 297 percent. In October that year, Google bought YouTube for US$1.65 billion; two months later, Time selected "You" as their 2006 Person of the Year, to recognize the growth of user-generated content on sites such as YouTube. Reflecting on the year, Jamie Byrne, YouTube's head of product marketing, remarked: "[2006] was really a pioneering year for online video and for user-generated content." According to comScore Media Metrix, the website attracted 133.5 million visitors worldwide during January 2007.

== 2007 Awards ==
As a result of the growth and success achieved during 2006, YouTube launched its own awards promotion in March 2007 to recognize the best user-generated videos of the previous year. The launch of the YouTube Awards was formally announced via a press release on March 18. Awards were to be presented in seven categories: Most Creative, Most Inspirational, Best Series, Best Comedy Video, Best Music Video, Best Commentary and Most Adorable. Ten videos were shortlisted in each category, with the shortlists having been compiled by the site's staff. Byrne explained: "We wanted to call out some of the most popular videos and let the users choose which ones deserve some additional recognition." YouTube users were invited to vote by visiting a dedicated webpage, which went live the following day, March 19. Users voted by ranking the ten videos in each category in order of preference, and could see what the up-to-date rankings were in real-time – Ben Fritz of Variety said that this made the process transparent.

Voting lasted for five days, closing on March 23; winners were announced two days later. Their prize was a trophy (a large, glass Play Button on a heavy, metal base) and prominence for their winning video on YouTube. American rock band OK Go won the Most Creative award for their music video Here It Goes Again. Accepting the award, lead singer Damian Kulash said that it was a surreal honor and that YouTube was changing culture "quickly and completely". Singer-songwriter Terra Naomi, whose song "Say It's Possible" won in the Best Music category, thanked the voters, saying: "The YouTube community has really embraced me; it means a lot to me." Naomi—who had signed a record deal with Island Records two months earlier—was 2007's only female winner. The remaining five winners were the Free Hugs Campaign (Most Inspirational), Ask a Ninja (Best Series), Smosh (Best Comedy), TheWineKone (Best Commentary) and Kiwi! (Most Adorable).

=== Winners ===
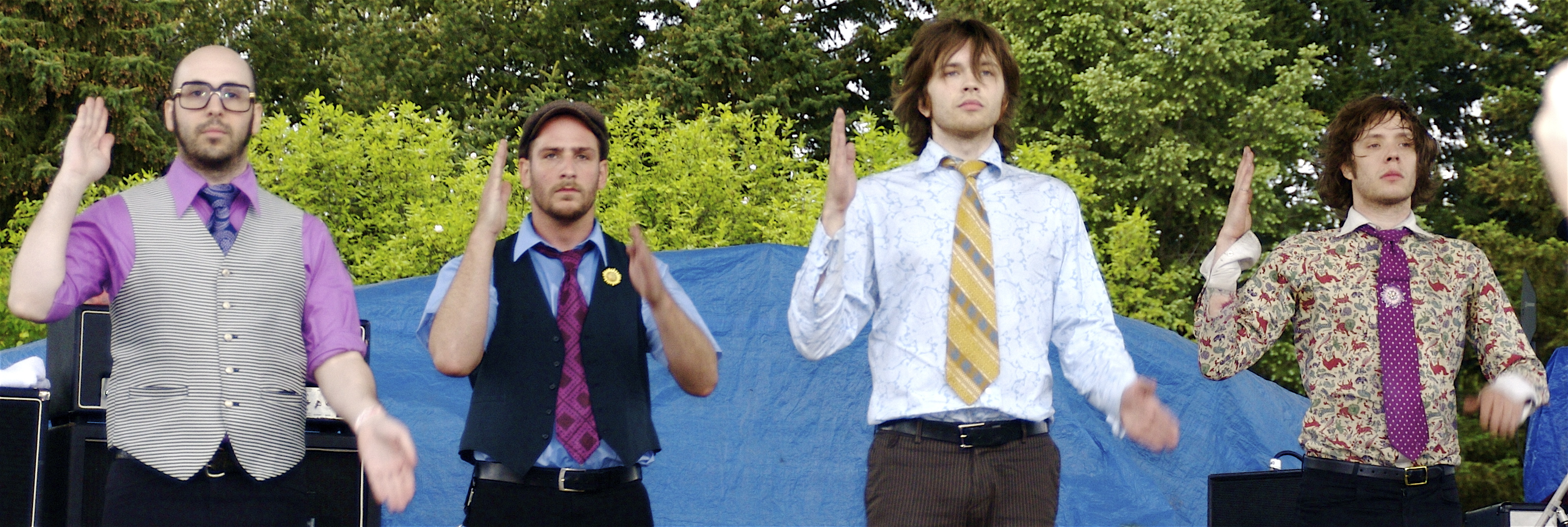
OK Go's music video Here It Goes Again was voted the most creative upload of the year.

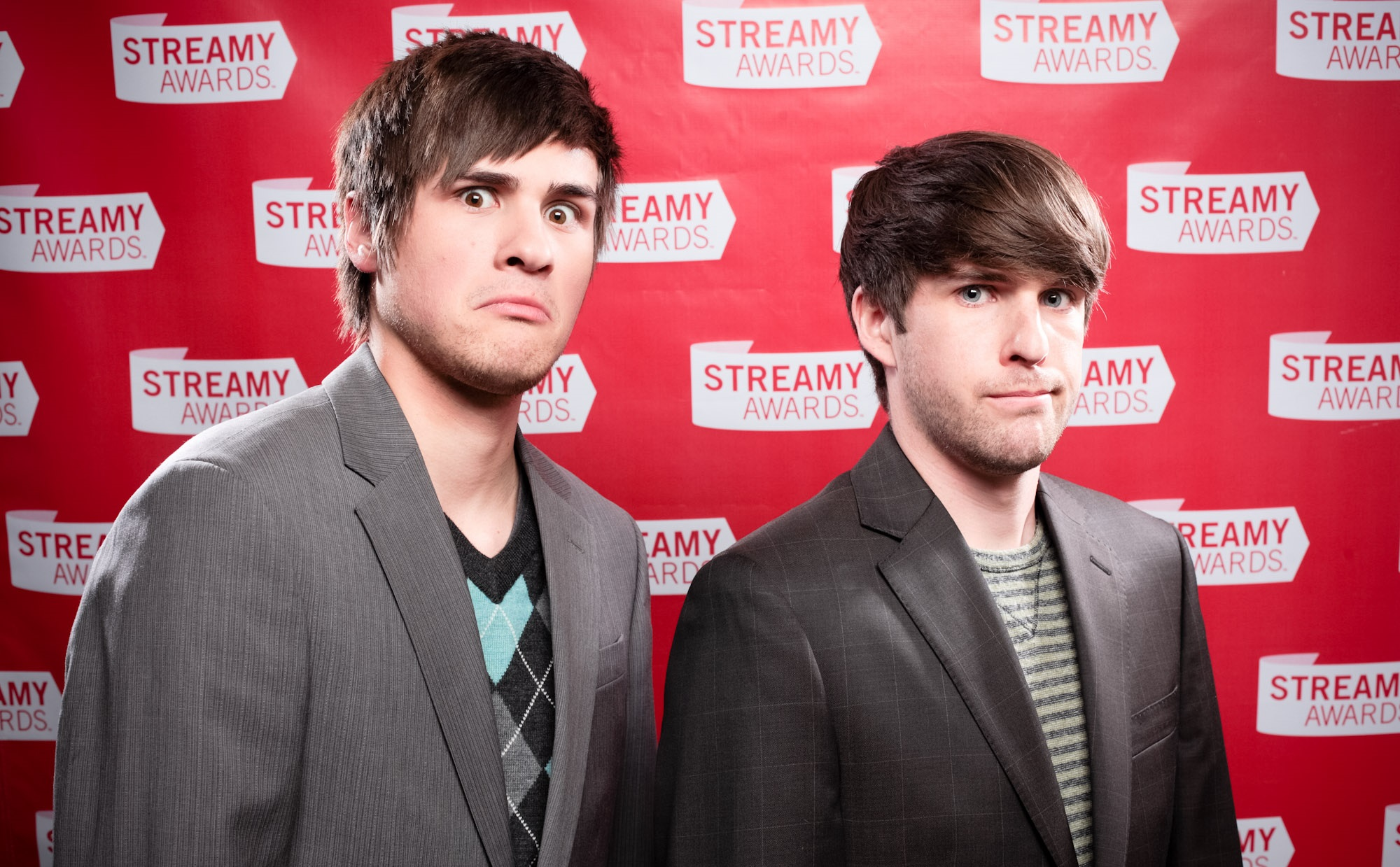
The Best Comedy Award went to Smosh for their sketch Stranded.

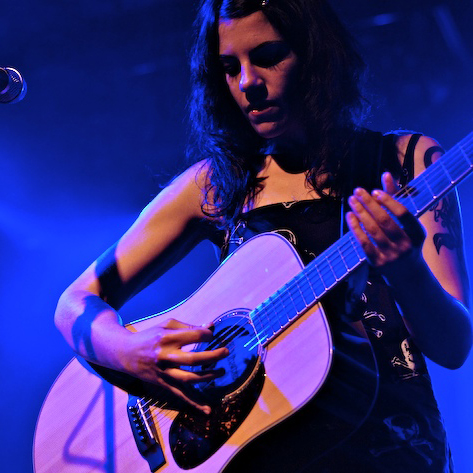
Terra Naomi won in the Best Music category for her song "Say It's Possible".

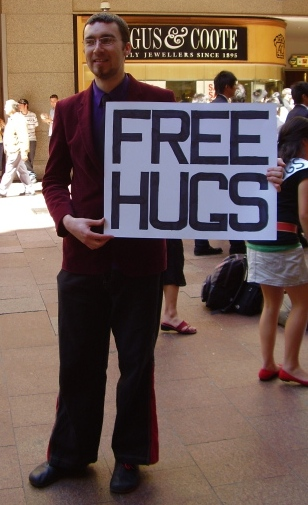
The Free Hugs Campaign (creator Juan Mann pictured) was voted the most inspirational video of 2006.

2007 YouTube Awards winners and nominations
Most Creative	Most Inspirational
OK Go – Here It Goes Again (OkGo); Where the Hell is Matt? (mattharding2718); Hyperactive – Lasse Gjertsen (lassegg); Noah takes a photo of himself every day for 6 years. (NK5000); Pachelbel Rant (paravonian); Fast Food Freestyle (Brt9003); Anti-gravity (MadV); Dmv drivers license prank part 2 (snaketar); Piece of Mind – Vancouver Film School (VFS) (VancouverFilmSchool); Spit Art (pimplywimp)	Free Hugs Campaign. Inspiring Story! (music by sick puppies) (PeaceOnEarth123); Heather Martin – When Are You Coming Home – by Bye2luv (Bye2Love); 9 months of gestation in 20 seconds – New Version! (lokimdog); Good bye Martin (MHarris1920); Love Letters – An Animated Proposal – v2.0 (worldofjeff); A Girl Like Me (bfnmusic); Why Walk 1000 Miles? (original edit) (taragolden); We Are All The Same (bbenefiel); Heaven (tobeornot2b); What are You thankful for? (nyOPERAguy)
Best Series	Best Comedy Video
Ask A Ninja: Special Delivery 1 "What is Podcasting?" (digitalfilmmaker); Ask A GAY MAN : Denim Edition (WilliamSledd); Chad Vader – Day Shift Manager (episode 1) (blamesocietyfilms); My First Kiss (lonelygirl15); Nobody's Watching Diet Coke & Mentos (impytherap); Will It Blend? – iPod (Blendtec); EPISODE #1: Dolly wants to play! (valsartdiary); SNOWMEN HUNTERS Ep 08: Michael Jackson F@#*s Boys (Zanzibar19); Marco Tempest – PhoneCam Magic #5 – The Kiss (virtualmagician); Secrets of MySpace at the workplace: Soup of the Day. EP 05 (soupcameron)	Smosh Short 2: Stranded (smosh); Mixed Nuts (HappySlip); Completely Uncalled For (BaratsAndBereta); Ben takes a photo of himself everyday (aconover); Things you CAN'T do when you're NOT in a pool (dontbethatguyfilms); Help Wanted (DCLugi); Greg Hits Hollywood (MediocreFilms); Celebrity (derrickcomedy); LisaNova Does P. Diddy (LisaNova); Love Corner – A Zebro Short (Zebro)
Best Music Video	Best Commentary
Say It's Possible (terranaomi); Pancakes! (GiR2007); Body's a Temple (jaybrannan); My Hands Are Bananas (Nandrews); Mr Pitiful – Roland's Song (mrpitifulband); Awakening – Classical Composition (chudnovsky); So, It's A Love Song (song) (periurban); Blues harmonica Improv (RonnieShellist); Duke Rightious' "C Minor Etude" (DukeRightious); Ryan Leslie Performs "Rescue U" (RyanLeslieTV)	Hotness Prevails / Worst Video Ever (thewinekone); The "smiley" intervention (MarkDayComedy); Re: FIVE QUESTIONS! (Zipster08); VIDEO ABOUT SARCASM (IRONIC/SATIRICAL) (Paperlilies); This Is YouTube at its best! (renetto); Plans and Dreams (boh3m3); Telling it all part 1 (geriatric1927); Guns V's Spoons (re: re: BumperBuggery) (Blunty3000); I AM GAY (mrpregnant); PSA for the ladies (littleloca)
Most Adorable
Kiwi! (Madyeti47); The Original Cuppycake Video (sonoman); Sleepy Spudgy (spudgy); ウェルシュ・コーギー Welsh Corgi (sutatabo); Gizmo Flushes (nsayer); black and white (freejavaman); It's so fun! farting baby. (phathune); Beatboxing Parrot! (arikp); Bunny letter opener 兔肉開信機 (unobb); Sleepy Baby Monkey named Mercutio (Adreamer323)

=== Reception ===
In a sense, the nature of online voting makes [the YouTube Awards] anachronistic. YouTube already relies on a ratings system to track the viewing habits of its fans and constantly promotes the most popular videos on its site.

— Eric Auchard of Reuters

Reaction to the 2007 YouTube Awards was generally negative. A common criticism from writers and Mashable founder Pete Cashmore was the late date of the promotion, in that it was an event honoring 2006 videos in March 2007. Steve O'Hear of ZDNet proposed that the awards should have taken place closer to Time's announcing of their 2006 Person of the Year. The five-day voting system was also panned. Journalist Virginia Heffernan described it as "rushed and almost certainly screwy", while Eric Auchard of Reuters remarked that asking users to vote for their favorite videos was anachronistic, since the site's five-star ratings system already tracked which videos were the most popular.

Blogger Robert Scoble compared the YouTube Awards to his own video awards show, the Vloggies, which had taken place six months earlier, and suggested that YouTube had copied his idea. Josh Lowensohn of CNET also compared the YouTube Awards to the Vloggies, arguing that the former was not a new idea. Lowensohn additionally criticized the prizes that the winners received, remarking: "I'd like to see YouTube offer some sort of cash or video camera prize."

Commentators also noted the timing of the announcement of the 2007 awards: five days after media conglomerate Viacom had filed a $1 billion lawsuit against YouTube for copyright infringement. Technology evangelist Don Dodge suggested that the awards were an attempt by YouTube to highlight content on their website that did not violate copyrights before the case went to trial. Dodge explained that he had been part of a similar program whilst at Napster, and that the awards might demonstrate to the courts that there was substantial non-infringing use of the website. Cashmore agreed with Dodge's assessment, pointing out that the awards were months too late, had no sponsor, and were concluded within a week. Writing for the Associated Press, Jake Coyle similarly described the awards as "a quick, hasty process".

== 2008 Awards ==
The YouTube Awards returned the following year to recognize the best videos of 2007, and were announced via a post on YouTube's official blog on March 13, 2008. As with the previous year, shortlists were compiled by YouTube's staff, based on the number of views and general buzz – in total, the nominated videos had a combined view count of nearly a quarter of a billion. For the 2008 Awards, five new categories were added (Best Sports, Best Political, Best Eyewitness, Best Short Film and Best Instructional), and the shortlists were reduced from ten videos to six. The voting process through which users selected the winners was also changed: to remove potential bias, the featured thumbnail and order of the categories changed randomly each time the voting page was refreshed. Users could vote once per day until March 19; the winners were announced on March 21. At this time, hundreds of thousands of users had cast votes.

In some categories, the winning videos had not been the favorites. In the Best Eyewitness category, Battle at Kruger, described by The Guardian as an unlikely newcomer, won against the "famous" footage of the University of Florida Taser incident. Similarly, a video by YouTube channel Barely Political, I Got a Crush...On Obama, had been viewed more than seven million times and had spawned worldwide media attention by the time it was nominated in the Best Political category. Despite this, the award went to Stop the Clash of Civilizations, a more serious-minded video by global organization Avaaz. Aaron Ferstman, a spokesman for YouTube, praised Avaaz's video for dealing with "serious issues like discrimination ... in kind of a neat way that speaks to young people." He also noted that Stop the Clash of Civilizations was the only Best Political nominee not related to the 2008 United States presidential election. In the Best Commentary category, Michael Buckley's video LonelyGirl15 is Dead! beat Leave Britney Alone! by Internet star Cara Cunningham. In an interview with MSNBC, Cunningham applauded Buckley's success, saying: "Congratulations to him!". Ferstman remarked that the races for both the Best Political and Best Commentary awards had been close.

The 2008 promotion was the final time that the YouTube Awards were presented. The awards were retired in 2009, with YouTube choosing instead to focus on the now defunct YouTube Live and the YouTube Symphony Orchestra, both of which had been launched towards the end of the previous year.

=== Winners ===
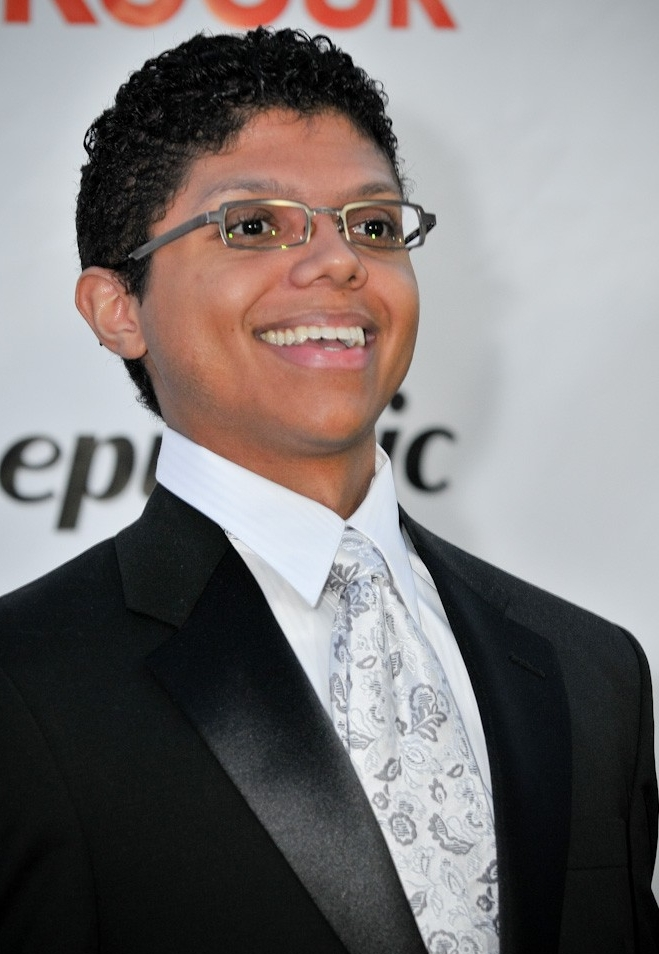
Tay Zonday said it was "definitely exciting" and "really an honor" to win the 2008 Best Music Award.

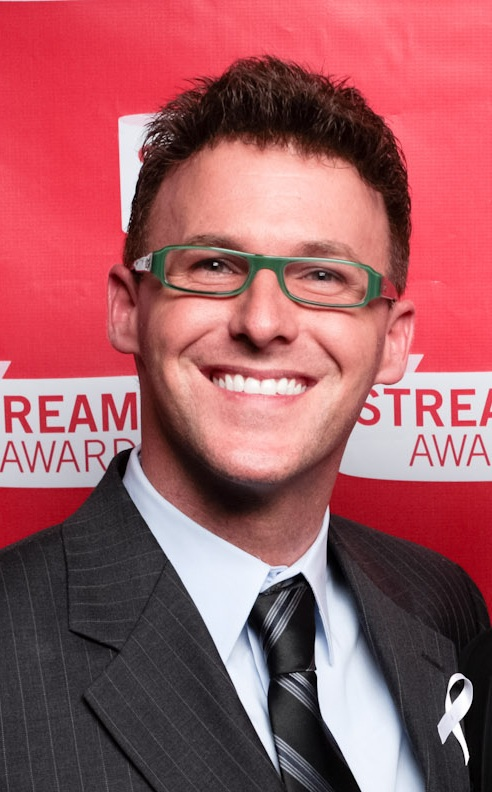
Michael Buckley's video LonelyGirl15 is Dead! won in the Best Commentary category.

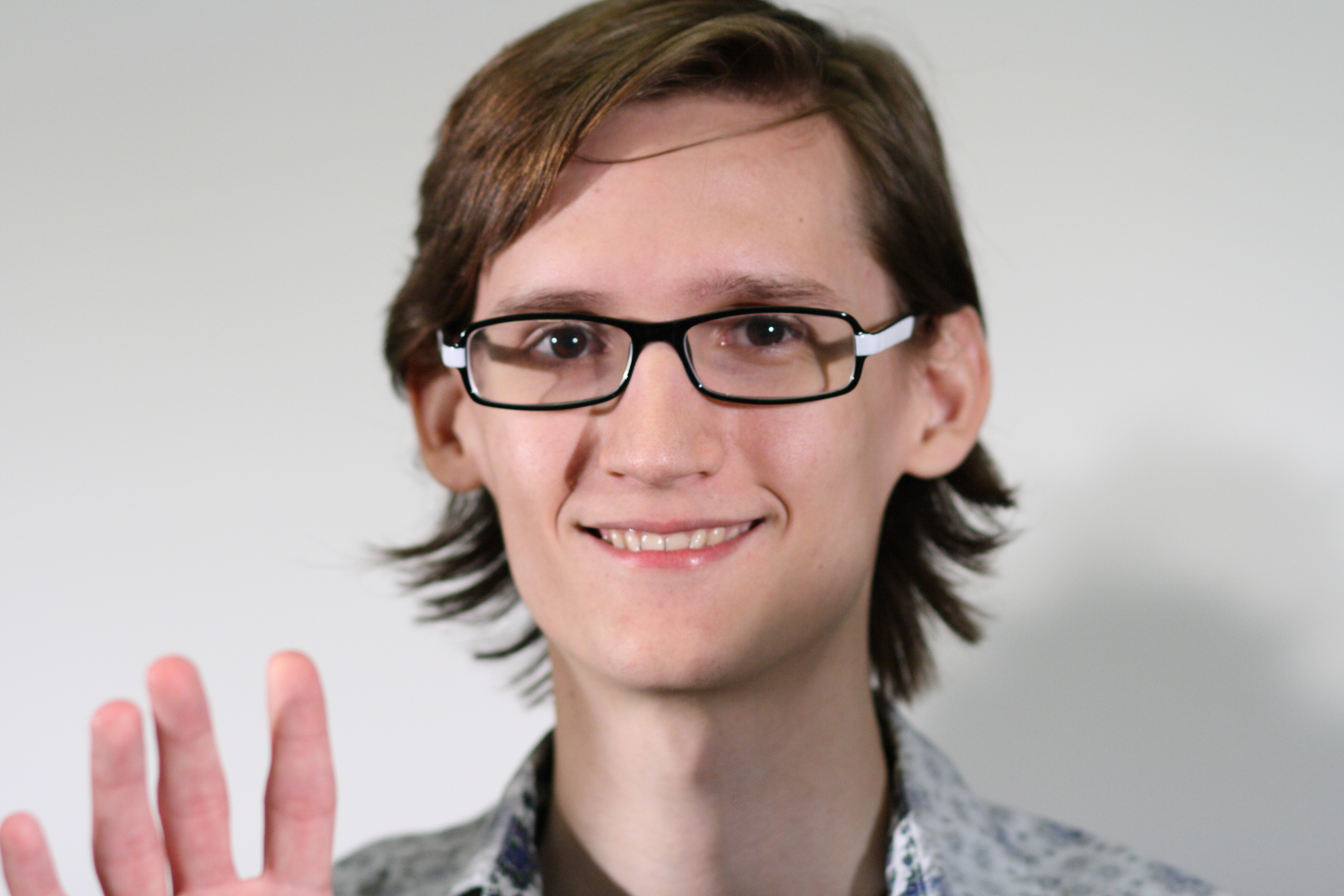
The 2008 Best Comedy Award went to Neil Cicierega for his video Potter Puppet Pals in "The Mysterious Ticking Noise".

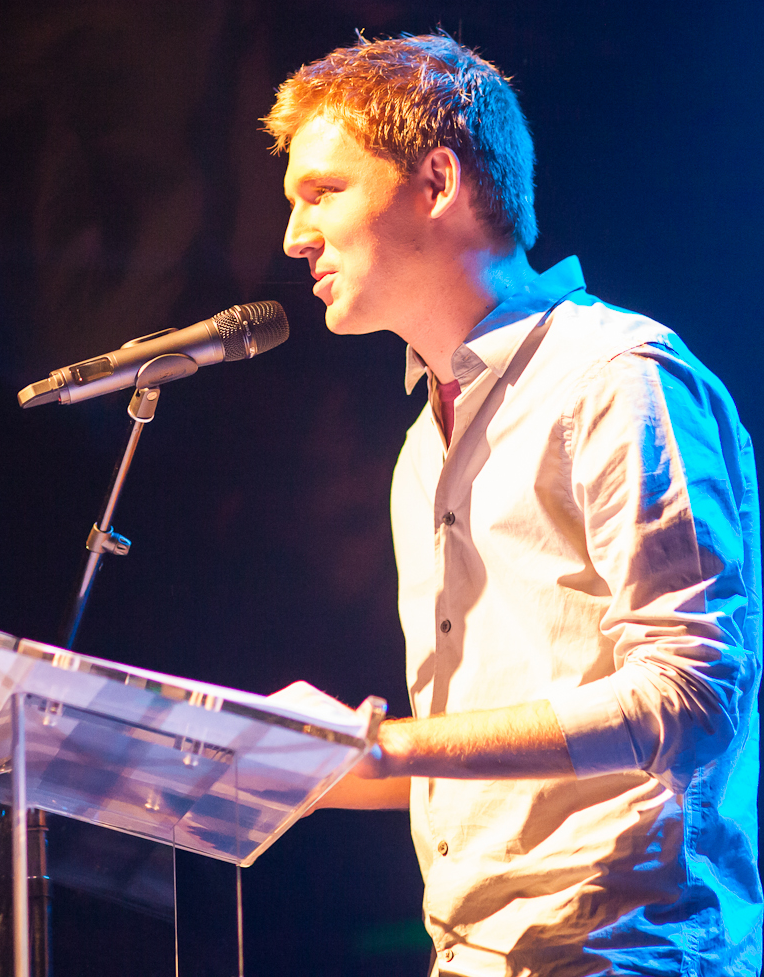
Blogger Dan Brown won a YouTube Award in 2008 for his video on how to solve a Rubik's Cube.

2008 YouTube Awards winners and nominations
Best Music	Most Creative
"Chocolate Rain" Original Song by Tay Zonday (TayZonday); Harmonica + Beatbox: Final Cut (yurilane); LISA LAVIE "ANGEL" In Full (lisalavie1); the vegetable orchestra (vegetableorchestra); Mia's Own Song!! (miarose); SCRAPER BIKE (spencer7910)	The Original Human TETRIS Performance by Guillaume Reymond (notsonoisy); Women In Art (eggman913); Kitty said what? – Morphing Kittens (PhotoAnimationGuy); How We Met (tracecats); What song is this? (OneManSho); How to paint the MONA LISA with MS PAINT (EclecticAsylumArt)
Best Web Series	Best Sports
The Guild – Episode 1: Wake-Up Call (watchtheguild); Elevator – Music (Manintheboxshow); "How To Seduce Women" Paul Rudd and David Wain (MyDamnChannel); Street Fighter: The Later Years – Part 3 (CollegeHumor); DINOSAUR – Part Two (waverlyflams); Naked Gay Ted: net_work (wwwBLACK20com)	balloon bowl (davetheknave); Puehse Twins Skateboarding (groms); 66 Inch Jump by Adrian Wilson (IkeiUnderground); TFB: 5'9 Best Dunker In The World:T-Dub-540 Dunk w/2 hands (TeamFlightBrothers); NBA Finals Lebron Etch A Sketch (etchedintime); urban and freestyle trial (priscadupontandco)
Best Political	Best Eyewitness
Stop the Clash of Civilizations (AvaazOrg); "I Got a Crush...On Obama" By Obama Girl (barelypolitical); Vote Different (ParkRidge47); HuckChuckfacts (explorehuckabee); STUDENTS: A CHALLENGE FOR YOU (davisfleetwood); Congressman Ron Paul Visits My Dorm Room (EmergencyCheese)	Battle at Kruger (Jason275); University of Florida student Tasered at Kerry forum (GainesvilleSun); INCREDIBLE TORNADO VIDEO!! May 4, 2007 – Ellis Co., OK (TornadoVideosdotnet); MONKS PRAYING SOLDIERS SHOOTING IN BURMA (JUVENILEBIRDS); Lightning Strike – Up Close (utherexplorer); WITCH FIRE SAN DIEGO (ryanremigiodotcom)
Most Inspirational	Best Short Film
Blind Painter (texascountryreporter); A Vision of Students Today (mwesch); I AM A MUSLIM! (Muradaldin); Four Eyed Monsters – Watch entire 71 min award winning film (foureyedmonsters); STAND UP for WORLD PEACE (maddogza); Randy Pausch: Really Achieving Your Childhood Dreams (carnegiemellonu)	my name is lisa (sheltonfilms); Doll Face (andrewhu); POUND (a short film by Evan Bernard) (EOG); My First Crush (juliapot); Black Button – Short Film (DarkHeartProductions); A tale of rock (eightgr)
Best Commentary	Best Comedy
LonelyGirl15 is Dead! (WHATTHEBUCKSHOW); Gullible is not in the Dictionary (AngryLittleGirI); AAGM: SHOW YOUR PRIDE (WilliamSledd); are you anybody's favourite person? (mememolly); In My Mind (olinkalex); LEAVE BRITNEY ALONE! (itschriscrocker)	Potter Puppet Pals in "The Mysterious Ticking Noise" (NeilCicierega); Let Me Borrow That Top (liamkylesullivan); Mario: Game Over (P0YKPAC); PARIS IN JAIL: The Music Video (omovies); Powerthirst (picnicface); David Blaine Street Magic Part 3 (ThoseLilRabbits)
Best Instructional	Most Adorable
How to solve a Rubik's Cube (Part One) (pogobat); How to Charge an iPod using electrolytes and an onion (HouseholdHacker); Head Tracking for Desktop VR Displays using the WiiRemote (jcl5m); Learn how to screenprint your own t-shirts (makemagazine); DIY – How to Make a Zine; Paper, Scissors, Pen – Rockin! (SamProof); Soulja Boy Tellem – How to Crank That – INSTRUCTIONAL VIDEO! (SouljaBoy)	Laughing Baby (gsager1234); The two talking cats (TheCatsPyjaaaamas); Otters holding hands (cynthiaholmes); ２足立ち (mumucoma); "NORA: Practice Makes Purr-fect" – Check the sequel too. (burnellyow); 3 year old Kassie is going to kick the Monsters ass ~( ask ) (skaughtiee)
