= Freddy Mullins =

American singer-songwriter

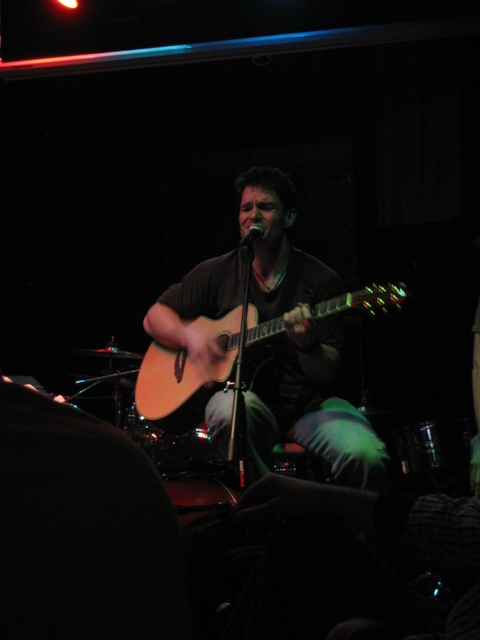
- Freddy Mullins performing live

Background information
- Born: Frederick Stephen Mullins; March 26, 1979 (age 47); Lexington, Kentucky, United States
- Origin: Nashville, Tennessee, United States
- Died: September 17, 2026 (aged 47) Lexington, KY
- Genres: Alternative folk, rock
- Occupations: Musician, singer-songwriter, Actor
- Instruments: Vocals, guitar, piano, harmonica, bass guitar, drums
- Years active: 2006–present
- Label: Bellajade Records (2006–present)
- Website: Official website

Frederick Stephen Mullins (born March 26, 1979) is a singer/songwriter and actor from Nashville, Tennessee. His musical style falls into the modern-folk label encompassing folk, folk-rock, and folk-soul. He has released six albums on the indy label Bellajade Records, an EP demo, Bring Me Blue, and five LPs, Everything in Between, Broken White Lines, When Mixed Up, Sleep Tonight, The Walkaway, and "The Future of Storytelling".

== Biography ==
=== Early life ===
Freddy Mullins was born and raised in Lexington, Kentucky and began his involvement in music with piano lessons beginning at the age of 8–13. After giving up piano for sports, he returned to it at the age of 19 and began composing piano pieces shortly after. After graduating college at the University of Kentucky with degrees in Marketing and Management, Freddy moved to Nashville at the age of 22. With no piano to play after his move, he quickly picked up and learned the guitar. During this time, Freddy's musical interests were consumed with folk singer/songwriters such as Ben Harper, Ryan Adams, Cat Stevens, and Jeff Buckley; all of which are credited as major influences on his music.

== Musical career ==
=== Debut album ===
Freddy Mullins' debut release, Bring Me Blue, is a collection of six demo recordings. It was released on November 7, 2006, and quickly established Mullins' thoughtful lyrical presence and "the gripping bluesy/soul aspects to Freddy's voice."

=== Everything in Between ===
Mullins' first full-length album released on February 14, 2007, helped further establish him as an up-and-coming singer/songwriter. From the CDbaby album review, "As the album's name implies, the songs on the album run you through the gauntlet of emotions including life, love, and loss. As he also established on Bring Me Blue, Mullins' writing is once again delivered without reserve as he boldly and unapologetically wears his heart on his sleeve."

=== Broken White Lines ===
Mullins' second full-length album released December 27, 2007. After being heavily influenced by fellow singer/songwriter Mark Kozelek, Mullins wrote this album in a complete retrospective sense. From the CDbaby album review, "Broken, as the title suggests, is a travelogue of sorts, speeding through retrospective memories of loves, losses, the places, and people that have brought him to the present. It is the equivalent of a tightly woven patchwork quilt, overflowing with empathy, warmth, nostalgia, and a yearning to reclaim what time has taken."

=== When Mixed Up ===
Released March 2008 When Mixed Up is a collection of various unreleased, live, and alternate versions of songs from 2006 to 2008.

=== Sleep Tonight ===
Released December 2008, Sleep Tonight marked Mullins' best commercially and critically received album to that point for him. The album was a true blend of all the elements that had been previously featured in the previous albums. Along with being received well, the album featured songs that were placed in several media outlets. "Black Rain" was a featured song in the film Butterflies by Ester Brymova.

=== The Walkaway ===
Released November 10, 2009, Mullins picked right up with where he left off on Sleep Tonight. The Walkaway did not focus on growth as much as it did refinement of the home Mullins sound found in Sleep Tonight. The confidence showed and it became Mullins' best selling album in just two days after its release. The album features a couple songs that were originally placed on his first demo, Bring Me Blue. Explains Mullins, "I had always wanted to record these songs with full studio production, but until now, I wasn't wanting to look back for anything. Now I embrace my past songs, and felt they helped make the album complete."

=== Live Like This ===
Released December 7, 2010, Mullins released a 6-song EP album entitled Live Like This. The album contained songs revisited and new tracks. Songs "Colorblind" and "Windows" were featured in the 2014 Film Alpha House

=== YouTube ===
As a big fan of live performances, Freddy Mullins is active with recording live performance songs and videos. Bellajade Records YouTube site has multiple live acoustic videos entitled, "Studio Sessions," where Mullins performs many of his most popular songs from all four of his albums. Over the last couple of years, popular YouTube personalities have used Freddy Mullins music in their videos including Olgakay. Collectively, Freddy's songs have been heard over a Million times on YouTube.

== Discography ==
- Bring Me Blue (2006)
- Everything in Between (2007)
- Broken White Lines (2007)
- When Mixed Up (2008)
- Sleep Tonight (2008)
- The Walkaway (2009)
- The Future of Storytelling (2015)

== Soundtracks ==
- Alpha House (2014 film) Alpha House Directed by Jake Cooney
- Butterflies Directed by Ester Brymova

== Chart positions ==
- The single "Come Home" from the album Sleep Tonight charted at #44 on iTunes Singer/Songwriter Chart in May 2010.

== Acting ==
Freddy is also an accomplished actor with appearances in over 70 film, commercials, and other musicians music videos including "Letters from Home" by John Michael Montgomery, "The More I Drink" by Blake Shelton and TV Shows such as ABC's Nashville
