= Butterflies (2009 film) =

- Directed by: Ester Brymova
- Produced by: Tom Duty
- Starring: Olga Kay; Lucas Cruikshank; Philip Defranco; Ben Going; Charles Trippy; KevJumba; Kicesie; Paperlilies; KatiesOpinion; Daxflame; Joe Satriani; Esmée Denters; Michael Buckley; Dave Foley; Renetto; ClipCritics; Katy Perry; Nigahiga; Chad Hurley
- Music by: Freddy Mullins; Skoch; Finotee; Luba Dvorak; Elena Siegman; Davedays; Josh Levine; Soulsearcher
- Release date: April 2009
- Running time: 72 minutes
- Country: United States
- Language: English

Butterflies is a 2009 documentary film directed by Czech filmmaker Ester Brymova. The film won the Alan J. Bailey Excellence Award in Documentary Filmmaking at the Action on Film International Film Festival, Pasadena, California in the same year. Butterflies was the first feature-length film to explore the lives of viral video stars and one of the first indie films to be launched on YouTube for rental.

The film stars Olga, Fred, SxePhil, Charles Trippy, KevJumba, Kicesie, Paperlilies, KatiesOpinion, Daxflame, Joe Satriani, Esmée Denters, Michael Buckley, Dave Foley, Renetto, ClipCritics, Nigahiga, and Chad Hurley.

The full movie has been made available online on YouTube.

== Soundtrack artists ==
- Ondra Skoch (from Czech band Chinaski)
- Freddy Mullins
- Finotee
- Luba Dvorak
- Elena Siegman
- Davedays
- Josh Levine
- Soulsearcher
