= Time Flies (John Michael Montgomery album) =

Studio album by John Michael Montgomery
- Released: October 14, 2008
- Studios: Dark Horse Recording Studio and Sound Kitchen (Franklin, Tennessee); Ocean Way Nashville, Essential Sound Studios, OmniSound Studios, Blackbird Studio and Lucky Man Studios (Nashville, Tennessee)
- Genre: Country
- Length: 44:07
- Label: Stringtown
- Producers: Byron Gallimore; John Michael Montgomery; Kimo Forrest; John Kunz

John Michael Montgomery chronology
Letters from Home (2004)	Time Flies (2008)

Professional ratings
Review scores
Source	Rating
AllMusic	3.5/5 stars
Billboard	(favorable)

Time Flies is the tenth and final studio album by American country music singer John Michael Montgomery. It was released October 14, 2008 on his own label, Stringtown Records, as his first studio album since Letters from Home four years previous. Three singles have been released from it. The first two, "Mad Cowboy Disease" and "If You Ever Went Away", both failed to chart on the Billboard Hot Country Songs charts. "Forever", the third single, became his first Top 40 country hit since "Letters from Home" in 2004, peaking at number 28.

== Track listing ==
No.	Title	Writer(s)	Length
1.	"What Did I Do"	George Teren, Jamey Johnson	3:20
2.	"Let's Get Lost"	Johnson, Jeremy Popoff, Arlis Albritton	3:13
3.	"If You Ever Went Away"	Daryl Burgess, Randy Houser	3:54
4.	"Forever"	James T. Slater	4:42
5.	"With My Shirt On"	Kelley Lovelace, Lee Thomas Miller, Luke Bryan	3:36
6.	"Mad Cowboy Disease"	Popoff, Johnson, Jonathan Maddux	3:31
7.	"Loving and Letting Go"	Greg Barnhill, Gary Hannan	5:21
8.	"Fly On"	George Molton	4:21
9.	"Drunkard's Prayer"	Jameson Clark, Chris Stapleton	4:08
10.	"All in a Day"	Burgess, Dan Demay	3:48
11.	"Brothers 'til the End"	Hannan, John Michael Montgomery, Phil O'Donnell	4:13
Total length:			44:07

== Personnel ==
- John Michael Montgomery – vocals
- Tony Harrell – acoustic piano (1–10), synthesizers (1–10), Wurlitzer electric piano (11)
- Byron Gallimore – synthesizers (1–10), electric guitars (1–10)
- Pat Buchanan – electric guitars (1–10)
- Brent Mason – electric guitars (1–10)
- Bryan Sutton – acoustic guitars
- Kimo Forrest – baritone guitar (11), electric guitars (11), backing vocals (11)
- Bruce Bouton – steel guitar (1–10)
- Dan Dugmore – dobro (1–10), steel guitar (1–10)
- Randall Currie – steel guitar (11)
- Stuart Duncan – mandolin (1–10), fiddle (1–10)
- Mike Brignardello – bass (1–10)
- Glenn Worf – bass (1–10)
- Tim Williams – bass (11)
- Shannon Forrest – drums (1–10), percussion (1–10)
- Marty Dillingham – drums (11)
- Steve Stokes – fiddle (11)
- Wes Hightower – backing vocals (1–7, 9, 10)
- Russell Terrell – backing vocals (8)
- Rusty VanSickle – backing vocals (11)

=== Production ===
- John Michael Montgomery – producer
- Byron Gallimore – producer
- Kimo Forrest – producer (11)
- John Kunz – producer (11)
- Sheila Shipley Biddy – A&R administration
- Marty Dillingham – A&R administration
- Ann Callis – production coordinator
- Karen Cronin – art direction
- Scott Reed – photography
- Jennifer Kemp – stylist
- Michael McCall – hair, make-up
- Cynthia McGill – alterations
- John Dorris – management for Hallmark Direction

Technical credits

- Hank Williams – mastering at MasterMix (Nashville, Tennessee)
- Julian King – engineer (1–10)
- Byron Gallimore – mixing (1–10)
- Kimo Forrest – additional recording (1–10), engineer (11)
- John Kunz – additional recording (1–10), engineer (11)
- Sara Lesher – assistant engineer (1–10)
- Erik Lutkins – assistant engineer (1–10)

== Chart performance ==
=== Album ===
Chart (2008)	Peak position
U.S. Billboard 200	172
U.S. Billboard Independent Albums	27
U.S. Billboard Top Country Albums	35

=== Singles ===
Year	Single	Peak positions
Year	Single	US Country
2008	"Mad Cowboy Disease"	—
2008	"If You Ever Went Away"	—
2008	"Forever"	28
"—" denotes releases that did not chart
