= Edensong =

- Origin: Middletown, Connecticut
- Genres: Progressive rock
- Years active: 2004 - present
- Members: James Byron Schoen; Tony Waldman; Stefan Paolini; Barry Seroff; TD Towers
- Past members: See below
- Website: www.edensongtheband.com

Edensong is a New York-based orchestral progressive rock band formed in 2004. Their 2008 debut album, The Fruit Fallen, and 2009/2010 festival performances have received much praise within the progressive rock community. The band released their latest album, 'Our Road to Dust' on 2025.

== History ==
=== College Years (2002–2005) ===
Edensong formed at Wesleyan University in Middletown, Connecticut in 2002. The band began as a collaboration between two students, drummer Matt Cozin, and singer/songwriter James Schoen. The two later joined forces with guitarist Ben Wigler, a former bandmate and childhood friend of Schoen's, under the name "Echoes of Eden." The band's debut production was an epic rock-opera, entitled “Beyond Eden,” performed at Wesleyan University in April 2003. The composition included a full rock band, orchestral instruments, a choir, and an African drumming ensemble.

=== After College (2005–2008) ===
After graduating from Wesleyan, Schoen and a fresh lineup took the project (by this time redubbed "Edensong") in a more traditional direction: standard rock band. The band focused primarily on live performances in the New York area. However, this emphasis on performance greatly detracted from their studio work, and ultimately delayed the production of their debut album, "The Fruit Fallen.” Tensions regarding a tour with fellow New York–based band Astronaut Down in 2006 caused the band to dissolve again. This left Schoen alone with the task of completing the recording and mixing of "The Fruit Fallen." The album was finally completed in October 2007 after being mastered by the legendary engineer Bob Katz, and was released in the summer of 2008 to widely held critical acclaim.

=== Echoes of Edensong (2008–2011) ===
As a performing band, Edensong became active in the festival circuit, playing three progressive rock festival performances: Three Rivers Progressive Rock Festival in August 2009, ProgDay in September 2009, and the Terra Incognita festival at Quebec City in May 2010. The band contributed the song Lorelai to The Haiti Projekt, a compilation of works by progressive rock artists created to raise relief funds in the wake of the disaster in Haiti. Their EP, “Echoes of Edensong: From the Studio and Stage,” features new studio-recorded tracks as well as selected live tracks from their festival appearances from 2008 to 2009.The cover artwork was done by noted New Jersey–based painter Alison Silva.

=== Years In The Garden Of Years (2011–2016) ===
In 2011 work began on Edensong's second full-length record, 'Years In The Garden Of Years'. Unlike 'The Fruit Fallen', this album would be composed by the band, with each member contributing to the compositional process. The concept album features an extended song cycle on themes of time, each song a different scale and perspective. Recorded at JBS studios by singer James Schoen and mastered by Bob Katz, the album features artwork by surrealist painter Dan May. The album will be released September 30th by Laser's Edge.

== Current members ==
- James Byron Schoen – Guitars & Vocals
- Nicholas DiGregorio – Drums & Additional Vocals
- Stefan Paolini – Keyboards & Additional Vocals
- Barry Seroff – Flute
- TD Towers – Bass & Additional Vocals

== Former members ==
- Tony Waldman – Drums 2009–2017
- Ben Wigler – Guitar 2002
- Aurora Maoz – Flute 2003
- Asa Sourdiffe – Violin and keyboards 2003
- Ian Carbone – Bass 2003–2004
- Rachel Kiel – Flute 2003–2005
- Matt Cozin – Drums 2002–2006
- TD Towers – Bass 2004–2006
- Mike Drucker – Violin 2003–2007
- Eve Harrison – Flute 2005–2007
- Ray Rizzo – Drums 2006–2007
- Arthur Sugden – Keyboards 2004–2007
- Carl Baron – Cello 2008–2009
- Mr. Paden – Bass 2006–2009
- Mike Tee – Bass 2009
- Matthew Bauer – Drums 2008–2010
- Mike Lunapiena – Cello 2010–2012

== Discography ==
- 2008 – The Fruit Fallen
- 2010 – Echoes of Edensong: From the Studio and Stage
- 2016 – Years in the Garden of Years
- 2025 – Our Road to Dust
