= Michael Buckley (YouTuber) =

American YouTube personality (born 1975)

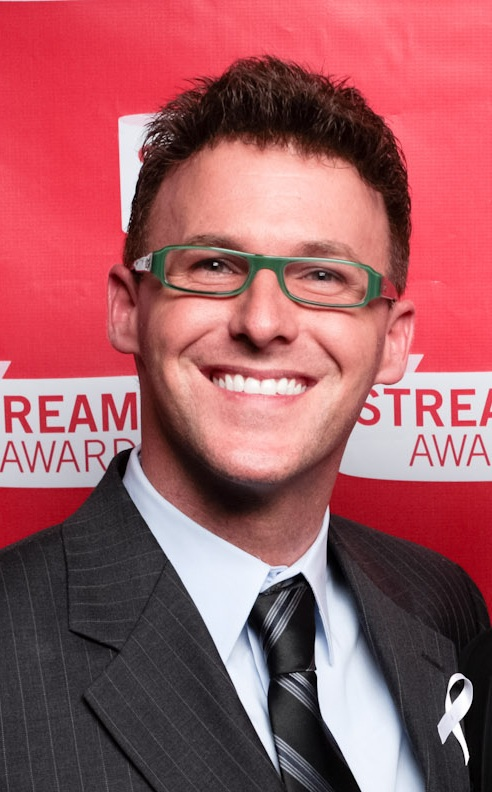
- Buckley at the 2013 Streamy Awards
- Born: Michael John Buckley; June 8, 1975 (age 51); Wallingford, Connecticut, U.S.
- Other names: Buckhollywood and WHATTHEBUCKSHOW
- Years active: 2006–2020
- Known for: Comedy, pop culture commentary
- Spouse: Mike Donegan (m. 2002; div. 2015)
- Website: heymichaelbuckley.com

Michael John Buckley (born June 8, 1975) is an American former YouTuber. Noted for his vlog What the Buck?!, Buckley commented on pop culture events and celebrities, at one point holding one of YouTube's most popular entertainment channels. Buckley "broke all records" of YouTube ratings when four of his shows ended up on the week's ten top-rated videos. He has appeared in magazines and newspapers such as The New York Times discussing Internet entrepreneurship and The Advocate discussing homophobia on the Internet. In 2008, he won a YouTube Award for best commentary with the video "LonelyGirl15 is Dead!"

== Early life ==
Buckley is one of three children, and is a fraternal twin. He moved to his parents' summer home on Cape Cod in Massachusetts after graduating from Saint Anselm College in Goffstown, New Hampshire, with a degree in psychology. He began working at a group home for children with developmental disabilities. He worked at Harwich Junior Theatre where he directed and choreographed Into the Woods and Leader of the Pack. He starred in Charlie and the Chocolate Factory and Little Women at HJT. In 2002, he moved back to Connecticut and started a "normal 9–5 office job" at Livenation. After appearing on television with his friend Kristin Tierney for a fund-raising drive for CPTV the two decided to create a public-access television cable TV chat show called Table for Two at Wallingford Public Access, the local public-access television studio in July 2005.

== Career ==
What the Buck?! began as a small weekly segment on Table for Two and gave him "a chance to riff and rant on his own". His cousin then posted some on YouTube and "it snowballed". Buckley started building a following on MySpace and started his YouTube channel in May 2006, with his main focus centered on celebrities and pop culture, often satirizing and parodying them. On September 11, 2008, he quit his low-paying day job as an administrative assistant for Live Nation, a music promotion company and began earning more money as an online entertainer. Edge Boston summarized his work as: "Three or four times a week, he uploads his slickly made commentaries on celebrities and pop culture that are amongst the snarkiest to be found on the web." His high-energy and rapid-fire delivery and style has been described as being "irreverent, fast-talking, pop-culture-obsessed"; he has been likened to "a living can of Red Bull." He was one of the most subscribed vloggers rising to be the second most popular comedian within the first five months of posting. His online success has led to more mainstream media work including DirecTV, Leeza Gibbons's syndicated radio show, a regular guest spot on Fox News' weekly gossip show Lips & Ears and Red Eye. Courtney Friel, host of Lips & Ears, came across What the Buck?! and invited Buckley onto the show, "The beauty of YouTube ... is that they have complete creative freedom."

On September 6, 2007, "The Top (& Bottom) Gays of YouTube!", the first all-gay collaboration video by YouTube's most subscribed video bloggers, was posted by Buckley to create a "YouTube gay village". Featuring James Majesty, Chris Crocker, William Sledd, and "Gay God" (Matthew Lush), the video consisted of each of the four bloggers commenting on the others' vlogging, with Buckley acting as host for the various outtakes. On April 23, 2008, Buckley began to broadcast regular live shows on the social broadcasting website, BlogTV. His live shows have already been viewed by over 200,000 people. He moved from BlogTV to YouNow and appeared Tuesday nights at 5 pm Eastern, but has stopped YouNow broadcasting and switched to ConnecTV, a site where users can text chat about TV shows live. He has started a YouTube channel titled BuckNews, a spinoff of What the Buck?! in which he included content that did not make his main show. Additionally, Buckley has introduced two spin-off shows (Pass the Buck and Buck Factor) which promoted the interaction between him and his fans, but no longer produces these. He has since closed his account "BuckNews". In March 2010, Buckley was nominated for a Streamy award in the category of "Best Web Series Host". Additionally Michael has created a new show titled "Dear Buck" where he answers questions posted on his website, Twitter, Facebook, and/or previous Dear Buck shows. In August 2010, he hosted the red carpet section of the 2010 Teen Choice Awards which was streamed live on the internet. During this he interviewed celebrities, television stars and web stars such as James Majesty. In June 2011, he took part in the "Who is my YouTube Date?" project hosted by Luke Cutforth. He was a guest judge on Genuine Ken with Whitney Port. In September 2011, Buckley had a guest appearance as himself in the sitcom Husbands. From March 2012 to October 2013, he hosted on myISH's ISHlist, a web series that counts down the top music videos in a particular genre or theme. In July 2012, Buckley was named the winner of the "Coast-to-Coast Co-Host Search" on Live! with Kelly; he co-hosted the morning show alongside Kelly Ripa on Tuesday, July 24. From September 2012- April 2013, he worked live chatting on ConnecTV, an app used for chatting about TV shows on a channel. With Buck uploading videos he has currently 395 Million views as of August 2014. In 2014, Buckley was listed on New Media Rockstars Top 100 Channels, ranked at #90.

In 2017, Buckley published the instructional book titled HELP! My Kid Wants to Become a YouTuber!

=== What the Buck!? ===
What the Buck?! is a celebrity gossip and comedy series of short videos created and posted on YouTube by Michael Buckley. The series featured Buckley who poked fun at celebrities, often making jokes while reporting on pop-culture news. The series started in 2005 on a public-access cable TV show called Table for Two. Later, clips were posted on MySpace, as well as on a YouTube channel called peron75, where it reached many more people. The show moved from Cable TV to YouTube, and by May 1, 2007, the What the Buck?! show had its own dedicated channel called 'WHATTHEBUCKSHOW". By 2008, the What the Buck?! YouTube channel was one of the top 10 most-subscribed-to YouTube channels, where it remained for about two years. The show had a peak of 1.43 million combined channel subscribers and 464 million total episode views. The last episode was posted to YouTube on July 1, 2016, when Buckley canceled the show in a video titled "The End".

=== Minisode Maniac! with What the Buck?! ===
In January 2009, Buckley became 'The Minisode Maniac' by discussing and promoting The Minisode Network's content on the Minisode's YouTube page and Crackle. Michael officially posted his last Minisode Maniac episode in mid-February. To celebrate he ran around his backyard in a speedo in the snow.

== Personal life ==
Buckley is pansexual and divorced. He lived in Connecticut with his former husband until 2017, and filmed the What the Buck?! show in his house there. As of December 2017, he lives in Denver, Colorado, to be close to his twin sister Debbie and nephew Luke. To show his fans his "softer side", he began to vlog about his home life on his peron75 YouTube channel, and used to appear live on BlogTV.
