= Unmute =

Mobile voice messaging application

- Original author: Justin Spraggins
- Developers: Unmute, Inc.
- Initial release: November 2015
- Operating system: iOS, Android
- Available in: English
- Type: Audio streaming Social networking service
- Website: onunmute.com

Unmute was a mobile voice messaging application, only available on the iOS platform. It has been featured as a "Best New App" in the iPhone App Store and has been featured on Product Hunt. Users include teens as well as celebrities, including actor Bellamy Young (Scandal), who hosted an Unmute call with thousands of listeners. Unmute has been compared to the livestreaming applications YouNow and Periscope, though Unmute is audio-only.

Unmute was developed by Justin Spraggins in April 2015 and launched in November. The app features audio streams between users, or calls, that can be listened in on by other users though the app. Listeners can contribute to the dialogue with text comment and photos.

The hosts of the calls can choose to "unmute" the listeners, and allow them to take part in the conversation like a call-in talk show. The calls are recorded and can be listen to after the call is completed. Users include Bellamy Young, who plays Mellie Grant in the ABC series Scandal.

Spraggins said the idea for Unmute came to him while sitting in traffic and he felt that people were losing out in having actual conversations, as texting gained prominence as a communications tool. "So I knew that at that moment the phone call needs a social facelift. It’s not cool anymore, so how do we make it cool again?" he said. As of January 2016, Spraggins told Business Insider Unmute was growing 100 percent week over week and with about 1 million minutes of streaming audio consumed on the platform.

The app has raised $2.2 million in seed funding from Greycroft Partners, Comcast Ventures, former NBA commissioner David Stern, and Robert Kirkman, the creator of The Walking Dead comic series.
