= Terra Naomi =

American musician

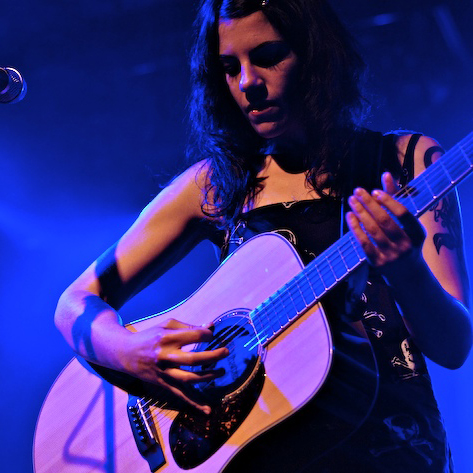
- Naomi in 2007

Background information
- Genres: Folk; indie folk; rock; alternative rock
- Occupations: Singer; songwriter
- Instruments: Guitar; piano
- Labels: Island Records; Universal Music Publishing
- Website: terranaomi.com

Terra Naomi Englebardt is an American indie folk singer-songwriter, who rose to fame through a performance of her song "Say It's Possible" on the video sharing site YouTube. Originally from New York State, but currently based in Los Angeles, she writes and performs her own songs, and plays the guitar and piano.

== Biography ==
Naomi was born in Saratoga Springs, New York, and raised on a farm for the first couple of years of her life. The family then moved to Cleveland, Ohio where they lived for six years before finally settling in upstate New York, from where her father, a plastic surgeon, originated. Her mother is a social worker. Naomi has one older brother and one younger brother. She is married to American actor Scott Turner Schofield.

== Classical beginnings ==
Naomi studied classical piano and voice, attending Belvoir Terrace Summer Camp in Lenox, Massachusetts. Teachers convinced her to pursue a degree in opera from The University of Michigan. During this time, Naomi also participated in the Aspen Opera Theater Program.

== Change in direction ==
Naomi moved to New York City after college and began writing songs. During this time, she also started playing guitar. She played at various clubs in Manhattan, including The Bitter End, The Sidewalk Cafe and The Living Room. Following a tour of the US in 2003, which started in New York and ended at the Bumbershoot Festival in Seattle, she moved to Los Angeles to work with the producer Paul Fox (XTC, 10,000 Maniacs, Sixpence None the Richer, Edwin McCain, Phish, The Sugarcubes).

Naomi has come to prominence in the international YouTube community where she broadcast her own "virtual" summer tour during 2006. The program included live performances from her apartment in Hollywood and question-answer sessions entitled "Ask a Wanna-be Rockstar". Her song, "Say It's Possible", filmed in Terra's Hollywood apartment, recorded on a Sony Handycam, appeared on YouTube in June 2006, causing an instant explosion of interest. "Say It's Possible" has inspired adoring fans to post hundreds of personal "YouTube covers" in a wide range of styles. This includes versions from countries in South America, North America and Europe. Fans have also translated and performed the song into Spanish, Italian and Mandarin Chinese and one used a sock puppet. In March 2007, she received one of the inaugural YouTube Video Awards in the music video category for "Say It's Possible", earning her appearances on NBC's The Today Show and CBS' The Early Show, as well as coverage on several international news programs.

Naomi has also been featured in articles for CNBC, Reuters, the Los Angeles Times, The LA Weekly, The Washington Post, Salon.com, and The Sunday Times (UK).

In fall 2006, Naomi was signed to a publishing deal with Universal Music Publishing Group. This was followed in January 2007 by the announcement that she had been also signed to the major record label, Island Records.

After releasing Under the Influence, Naomi left Island Records. She released her new album, To Know I'm Ok, independently in June 2011. It was funded through fans via Pledgemusic, an "international Direct-to-Fan platform for raising funds".

== Tours and notable performances ==
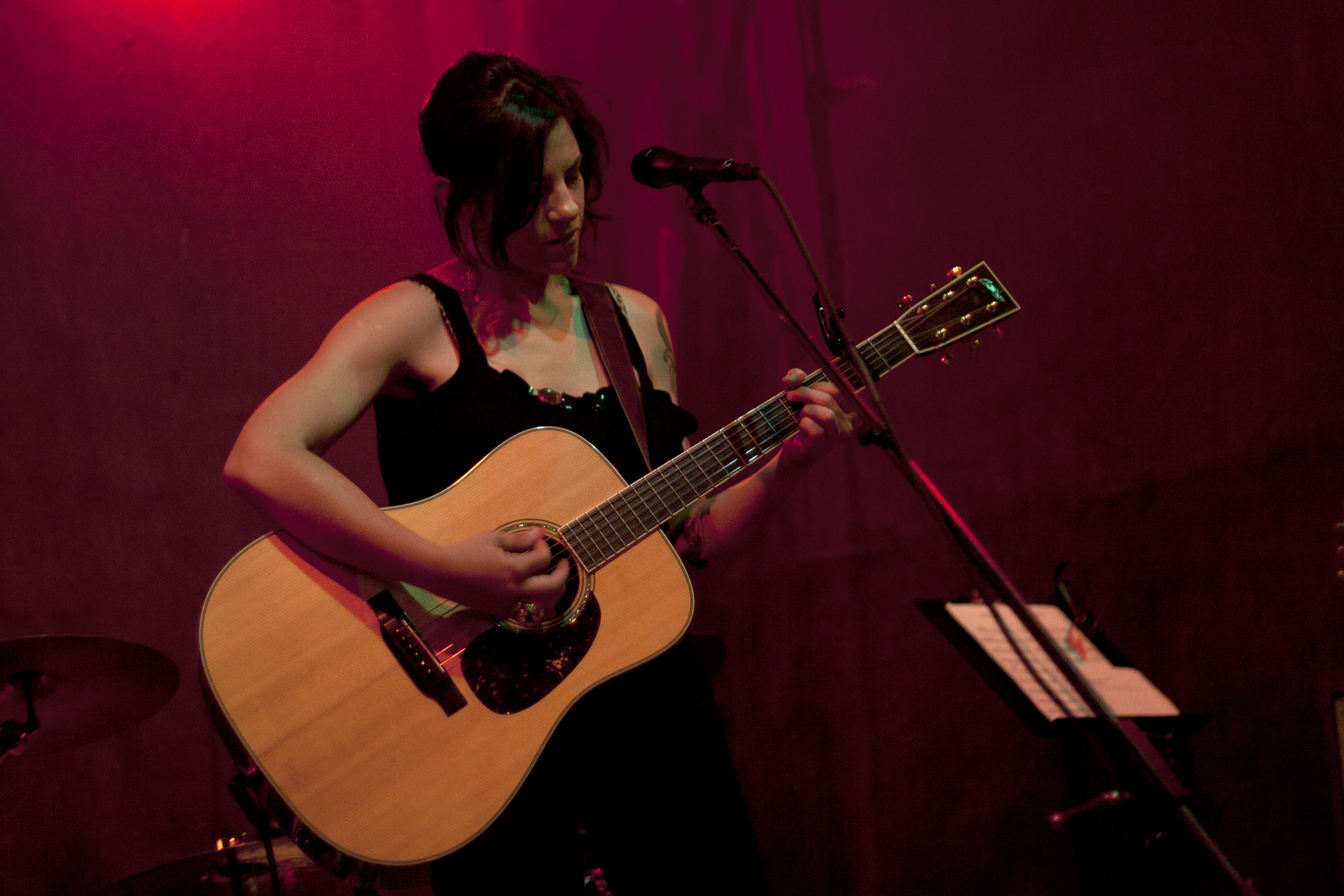
Terra Naomi performing at the Hotel Utah Saloon in San Francisco

Naomi headlined national tours in the United States in 2003, 2004, and 2005, which included dates at the Chicago House of Blues, NYC's Irving Plaza, The Trocadero in Philadelphia, The Abbey in Chicago, The Gypsy Tea Room in Dallas and The Hotel Cafe in Los Angeles and has also performed shows in Canada and the United Kingdom. Shows in the United Kingdom included an appearance at the In The City festival in Manchester . She has also opened for Tyler Hilton, Michael Bolton, Jay Brannan, The Fray, Martha Wainwright and Natasha Bedingfield.

In 2007, after being invited by Al Gore, Naomi performed "Say It's Possible" at the UK leg of Live Earth at Wembley Stadium in London. Later that year, YouTube Russia was launched and Naomi was invited to perform and help launch it.

In November 2009, Naomi began a two-week tour of India playing shows in Mumbai, Bangalore and Delhi culminating with a headlining performance at the Mercy Corps Say It's Possible Climate Change Concert in Srinagar, Kashmir. This tour was sponsored by American Center, Levi Strauss & Co. India, Fabindia and Mercy Corps. Naomi's Indian tour was followed by two weeks in Italy playing shows in Fabriano, Perugia, Rome, Imola, Bologna, Rimini, Monte Castello Di Vibio and Montesilvano. During her stay in Italy she also recorded a duet with Italian singer Elisa.

In early July 2010, Naomi performed at Lilith Fair's San Francisco show after winning a competition sponsored by OurStage.com. In August, she toured Italy again, playing in Rimini, Milan, Padua, Montepulciano and Castiglione del Lago.

In June 2011, Naomi performed the inaugural show for the Haus of Hipstamatic Unplugged Summer Sessions in San Francisco. The event was the first in a series of unplugged sessions featuring other singer-songwriters such as Michelle Branch and was hosted by Hipstamatic at their office space in SoMa. The music video for "You For Me" also debuted at the event, which is archived on Ustream. A video for "I'll Be Waiting" was also shot.

In January, February and March 2012, she toured Europe, doing more than 30 concerts. The European countries she toured include UK, Italy, France, Germany and Switzerland.

== Record label ==
Naomi published an essay in 2015 called "How Signing A Major Record Deal Nearly Destroyed My Music Career" in Digital Music News. The article told the detailed story of Naomi's experience at Universal Island Records.

== 2018 ==
=== Indiegogo ===
In 2016, Naomi announced an Indiegogo campaign to raise funds for her first album since 2012. The campaign exceeded its goal of $35,000, ultimately raising $51,000 from 600 people.

=== Album release ===
==== "Machine Age" single ====
Naomi released "Machine Age," the first single from the album, via Bandcamp on January 19, 2018. It was described as both a "protest song" by INTO magazine and a "peaceful plea" by Broadway World. Billboard called the song "A poignant reflection on Trump's first year in office", Jubilant wrote "'Machine Age,' by singer-songwriter Terra Naomi may be the first truly great song to come at the expense of the world's collective sanity", Women In Rock wrote "Terra Naomi is the voice that all women need right now".

==== "Nothing To Hide" single ====
Naomi released "Nothing To Hide" the first single from the album, via Bandcamp on March 9, 2018. The song premiered on Popdust.

== Discography ==
=== Albums ===
- Terra Naomi (2002)
- Virtually (2006)
- Under the Influence (2007)
- To Know I'm OK (2011)
- Live & Unplugged (2012)
- Secret Songs (2018)

=== Extended plays ===
- Live & Free (2004)
- Terra Naomi (2004)
- 8-Track (2005)
- Go Quietly (2009)
- You For Me (2009)

=== Singles ===
- Machine Age (2018)
- Nothing To Hide (2018)

Year	Single	Peak positions		Notes	Album
Year	Single	UK Airplay	UK Sales	Notes	Album
2007	"Say It's Possible"	-	-	Released: June 8, 2007; #1 on MTV Flux; 2006 YouTube Music Video of the Year	Under the Influence
2007	"Not Sorry"	53	184	Released: September 10, 2007; #1 on MTV Flux	Under the Influence
2007	"Up Here"	-	-	Released: November 19, 2007	Under the Influence

=== Other appearances ===
These songs have been released on albums that were not a studio album released by Naomi.

Year	Song	Album
2005	"Ghosts of Happy Endings"	Interlude Magazine: Compilation 1.0
2006	"Flesh for Bones"	Coffee House Music 2006 Female Artists
2006	"Clean"	Sherrybaby OST
2007	"The Moment"	Because I Said So OST
2007	"Flesh for Bones"	The Word: Now Hear This! (July 2007)
2010	"Billie Jean"	MJ Acoustic Covers – Tribute to Michael
2011	"Nobody Knows You Anymore"	Super OST

== Songs in other media ==
Year	Title	Type	Song
2006	American Idol	TV series episode: "Chicago Auditions"	"Up Here"
2006	Junior Year Abroad	Web series	"Flesh for Bones"
2006	Junior Year Abroad	Web series	"Go Quietly"
2006	Junior Year Abroad	Web series	"Say It's Possible"
2006	Sherrybaby	Film	"Clean"
2006	Because I Said So	Film	"The Moment"
2007	Diamonds in the Rough	Film documentary	"Babuzze Lwaki?" (with Bataka Squad)
2007	Diamonds in the Rough	Film documentary	"Diamonds in the Rough"(with Saba Saba & Okai)
2007	Private Practice	TV series episode: "In Which Sam Gets Taken for a Ride"	"Say It's Possible"
2009	PG Porn	Web series episode: "Squeal Happy Whores"	"Song for a Squeal Happy Whore"
2011	Life in a Day	Film promos	"Close To Your Head"
2011	Super	Film	"Nobody Knows You Anymore"
2012	Coldwater Creek Mother's Day	Commercial	"You For Me"
2018	So You Think You Can Dance	TV series episode	"Less Talk More Art"

== Awards and nominations ==
Year	Award	Nominated work	Category	Result
2007	YouTube Awards	"Say It's Possible"	Music Video of the Year	Won
2010	Lilith Local Talent Search	Terra Naomi	San Francisco	Won
2011	Billboard Song Contest	"I'll Be Waiting"	Best Pop Song	Won

== See also ==
- Notable YouTube users
