= Say It's Possible =

Single by Terra Naomi

from the album Under the Influence (2007)
- B-side: "Say It's Possible (Acoustic)"
- Released: June 11, 2007
- Genre: Alternative rock
- Length: 4:01
- Label: Island
- Songwriter(s): Terra Naomi

"Say It's Possible" is Terra Naomi's first single and first solo release on a major label. The song originated on YouTube, and due to its origins the song has been covered on the website in a variety of different styles and languages. In March 2007, it won the first YouTube Video Award in the category Best Music.

== Videos ==
The first video appeared on YouTube in June 2006, five days after Naomi had written the song and quickly became a featured video. A second video was released in December 2006, compiling amateur footage of YouTubers from around the globe. The third video, which will be used to promote the single, reuses the concept of the second video.

== Inspiration ==
Naomi stated that she was inspired to write the song after seeing the film An Inconvenient Truth.

== Other media ==
- Say It's Possible was featured at the end of the Private Practice episode, "In Which Sam Gets Taken For a Ride".
