= Mike Drucker =

American stand-up comedian and writer

- Born: 15 March 1984 (age 42); Coral Springs, Florida
- Education: New York University
- Writing career
- Genre: Comedy
- Notable works: Full Frontal with Samantha Bee, The Tonight Show Starring Jimmy Fallon, Bill Nye Saves the World
- Notable awards: Writers Guild of America Award for Best Comedy/Variety in 2020

Mike Drucker is an American stand-up comedian, writer and producer known for his work on Full Frontal with Samantha Bee (2016), The Tonight Show Starring Jimmy Fallon (2014) and Bill Nye Saves the World (2017).

== Filmography ==
Drucker was a head comedy writer for Bill Nye Saves the World and writer for Adam Ruins Everything. He also wrote for The Tonight Show Starring Jimmy Fallon in New York City. Drucker was a contributing writer to The Onion and Saturday Night Live. He has been published in McSweeney's and Black20. He also briefly worked at Nintendo of America, working on script adaptation for the English-language releases of the video games Kid Icarus: Uprising and Mario Party 9. During his time as an intern on Saturday Night Live, his nerdy mannerisms were noticed by writers and he was subsequently parodied by Zach Braff in a Bronx Beat sketch.

== Awards ==
In 2007, he was one of three winners of Disney's "So You Think You're Funny" stand-up competition, a joint-venture by Disney and MySpace to promote the movie Ratatouille.

Drucker was nominated for" Outstanding Writing for Non-Fiction program" in 2017 for Bill Nye Saves the World. He was also nominated for a Primetime Emmy Award for "Outstanding Writing - Variety Series" for two years running (2018 and 2019) for Full Frontal with Samantha Bee. He has received eight Emmy nominations.

Drucker won the Writers Guild of America Award for Best Comedy/Variety in 2020, with Full Frontal. He had previously been nominated for the Award several times.
