= Scitex Vision =

Israeli printing equipment manufacturer

Scitex Vision Ltd.
- Company type: Now owned by HP Inc. Part of the Graphic Arts division
- Industry: Printing; Graphic Arts
- Founded: 1994
- Headquarters: Netanya, Israel
- Products: Large-format, Commercial and Industrial Printing Solutions
- Website: HP Scitex

Scitex Vision was an Israel-based company that specialized in producing equipment for large- and very-large-format printing on both paper and specialty materials. It was part of Scitex Corporation Ltd. The operations of Scitex Vision, together with rights to the name Scitex were acquired by Hewlett-Packard in 2005 (and renamed HP Scitex).

== History ==
Scitex Vision was incorporated as Idanit Technologies Ltd. on 19 May 1994. It was acquired by Scitex on 25 February 1998 and changed its name to Scitex Wide Format Printing Ltd. on 24 February 1998. In October 1998, its operations were expanded by the purchase of the super-wide format product line of the Matan group of companies. On 21 August 2000, it adopted the name Scitex Vision.

In 2003 Scitex Vision Ltd. merged with Aprion Digital Ltd., which was formed in 1999 as a spin-off of Scitex's Advanced Printing Products Division, and developed drop-on-demand inkjet technologies and products. The merger positioned the company as a market leader in the industrial digital printing arena.

On February 29, 2008, Hewlett-Packard completed the acquisition of NUR Macroprinters Ltd, another Israeli manufacturer of super-wide format industrial printers. The NUR Macroprinters business was merged into the brands of HP Scitex.

== Brand name ownership ==
Hewlett-Packard's acquisition of Scitex Vision included also the Scitex brand name rights. Because of this, in January 2006 the Scitex Corporation changed its name to Scailex Corporation. The Scitex brand name is used by Hewlett-Packard for its wide format industrial printers product line.
