= Under the Influence (Terra Naomi album) =

Studio album by Terra Naomi
- Released: September 17, 2007
- Genre: Rock, pop, alternative
- Length: 48:16
- Label: Island

Terra Naomi chronology
Under the Influence (2007)	To Know I'm OK (2011)

Singles from Under the Influence
- 1. "Say It's Possible" Released: June 11, 2007; 2. "Not Sorry" Released: September 17, 2007; 3. "Up Here" Released: November 20, 2007

Professional ratings
Review scores
Source	Rating
The Celebrity Cafe	(link)
BBC Music	Positive (link)
Q	October 2007, p.101

Under the Influence is the first major label album by the American singer/songwriter Terra Naomi.

== Track listing ==
1. "Say It's Possible" – 3:51
2. "Not Sorry" – 3:50
3. "Up Here" – 3:59
4. "I'm Happy" – 3:40
5. "Never Quite Discussed" – 3:33
6. "Flesh for Bones" – 5:35
7. "Close to Your Head" – 3:13
8. "Jenny" – 3:21
9. "Million Ways" – 4:14
10. "New Song" – 4:34
11. "Something Good to Show You" – 8:32
- "The Vicodin Song" – this hidden song begins playing at the 4:05 mark after "Something Good to Show You"
