= Paul Robinett =

American vlogger and entrepreneur

Paul Robinett, known by his screen name Renetto, is an American vlogger and entrepreneur. Robinett's videos have attracted over 56 million views, and his YouTube channel has over 44,500 subscribers. His channel has been viewed over 31.2 million times.

In 2013, Robinett was featured in a Wired article titled "The rise and fall of YouTube's celebrity pioneers".

== YouTube career ==
Robinett began posting videos on YouTube in mid-2006. Initially, he posted videos as the character "renetto", "a squeaky-voiced, intellectually challenged reviewer of others' YouTube videos." Robinett initially created the character to "amuse his business partner at the time". The character has been described as "bizarre and sometimes grotesque" by Nicholas Tufnell of Wired.

Robinett released a video called "Diet Coke+Mentos=Human experiment: EXTREME GRAPHIC CONTENT" posted in August 2006, in which he placed a large quantity of Mentos in his mouth and drank Diet Coke at the same time, and implied that he suffered serious injury as a result.

Robinett was nominated for the first YouTube Video Awards. He is also an official partner in YouTube's revenue sharing program. Robinett is based in Canal Winchester, Ohio, where he owned and ran a candle shop and sold hand-signed, hand-poured candles. In September 2007 he announced his move and challenged YouTubers to find him, and ended up in Ahwatukee, Phoenix, Arizona. He later returned to Ohio but now resides in Florida.

== Personal life ==
Paul is divorced from his wife Andrea. They have 4 children together.

== See also ==
- List of YouTube celebrities
