= Tapuz =

- Industry: Internet services
- Headquarters: Ramat Gan, Israel
- Website: www.tapuz.co.il

Tapuz (Hebrew: תפוז, lit. "Orange fruit") or Tapuz Anashim (Hebrew: תפוז אנשים, lit. "Orange - People"), is an Israeli Web portal, especially known for its Internet forums, and other web media such as BlogTV.
