= Ilan Ben-Dov (businessman) =

Israeli businessman

- אילן בן-דב
- Born: 16 January 1957 (age 69); Tel Aviv, Israel
- Occupation: businessman

Ilan Ben-Dov (Hebrew: אילן בן-דב; born 16 January 1957, in Tel Aviv, Israel) is an Israeli businessman and investor.

== Business career ==
Ilan Ben-Dov started in business at the age of 17, working as a games operator at a swimming pool. He began importing SEGA electronic games 13 years later, before founding Suny Electronics Ltd in 1991. In 1993, during a Tel Aviv Stock Exchange bubble, Suny raised NIS 20 million in an IPO.

In 1998, Ben-Dov obtained the Israel franchise to import Samsung Electronics cellular telephones, and acquired control of the Achla web portal from Avi and Hagit Maor in September 1999. Acquisitions continued to grow the empire, and in January 2001 Ben-Dov acquired the Tapuz web portal for $450,000 through Achla. In March 2000, Pelephone and Ben-Dov launched GoNext, the first wireless Internet company in Israel. On 29 October 2002, Ben-Dov sold all of his shares in GoNext to Pelephone for NIS 42 million. On 27 December 2004, he sold 3% of IDB Holding Corp. to Nochi Dankner.

In January 2004, he founded, together with Oren Levy, Dan Chen, Guy Alon Eliav and Nir Ofir, a video chat website that he called BlogTV in Israel. in 2006 the website offered its service to the rest of the world and became popular in the US and Canada. in December 2007, the Israeli TV show To Catch a Predator by Arutz Eser was devoted to impersonating 13 years old girl named "Lotem13" and detaining male adults who contacted her via the BlogTV chat for sexual liaisons.

On 4 April 2005, he bought more 6.3% of Giron shareholding. In 2005, Ben-Dov expanded his financing activity and founded Tao Tsuot Ltd., which made a number of leveraged investments in public companies. However, these investments were made at the height of the bull market. Tao took a severe battering during the market crash in 2008, posting heavy losses as share prices crashed, and it fell into a shareholders' equity deficit.

In 2008, he restructured Suny's holdings and sold the Samsung cellular telephone import business to Suny subsidiary Scailex Corp. ltd. Except for importing Samsung cellular telephones, Suny was active in the Internet service field through its controlling interest in Internet portal Tapuz People Ltd and BlogTV. In August 2009 Ben Dov acquired control of Partner Communications from Hutchison Telecommunications International for NIS 4.7 billion (about $1.38 billion), financed through loans provided by the financial institutions that bought his bonds, the banks, and Hutchison's seller's loan. On 10 January 2010, he sold 4.92% of Azorim Investment, Development and Construction Ltd. for NIS 36.8 million.

In October 2010, Ben-Dov bought 012 Smile for NIS 1.5 billion. In December 2012 Ben dov sold 30.7 percent of Partner Communications along with control of the company to Haim Saban. On 6 May 2013, Ben Dov put Tapuz up for sale.

On 10 July 2013, a court ordered the liquidation for Ben-Dov's Tao. The following day Bank Leumi granted a temporary foreclosure order against Ben-Dov's assets. In September 2013 Ben Dov sold the Tapuz web portal to Trendline Information and Communication Services Ltd. for NIS 4.3 million. On 23 June 2014, Scailex board ousted Ilan Ben-Dov as chairman.

Ben-Dov has made a number of financial investments, and Suny has become a party at interest in several companies, including IDB Holding Corp. Ltd.

== Holdings ==
- User trend (formerly: Tapuz people)
- BlogTV
- Partner Communications Company Ltd.
- 012 Smile
- Suny.com Ltd.
- Derech HaLotus Ltd.
- Refuat Halotus Ltd.
- Tao Tsuot Real Estate Ltd.
- Ben Dov Investments Ltd.
- I. Ben Dov Investments Ltd.
- Harmony (Ben Dov) Ltd.
