= William Sledd =

American Internet personality

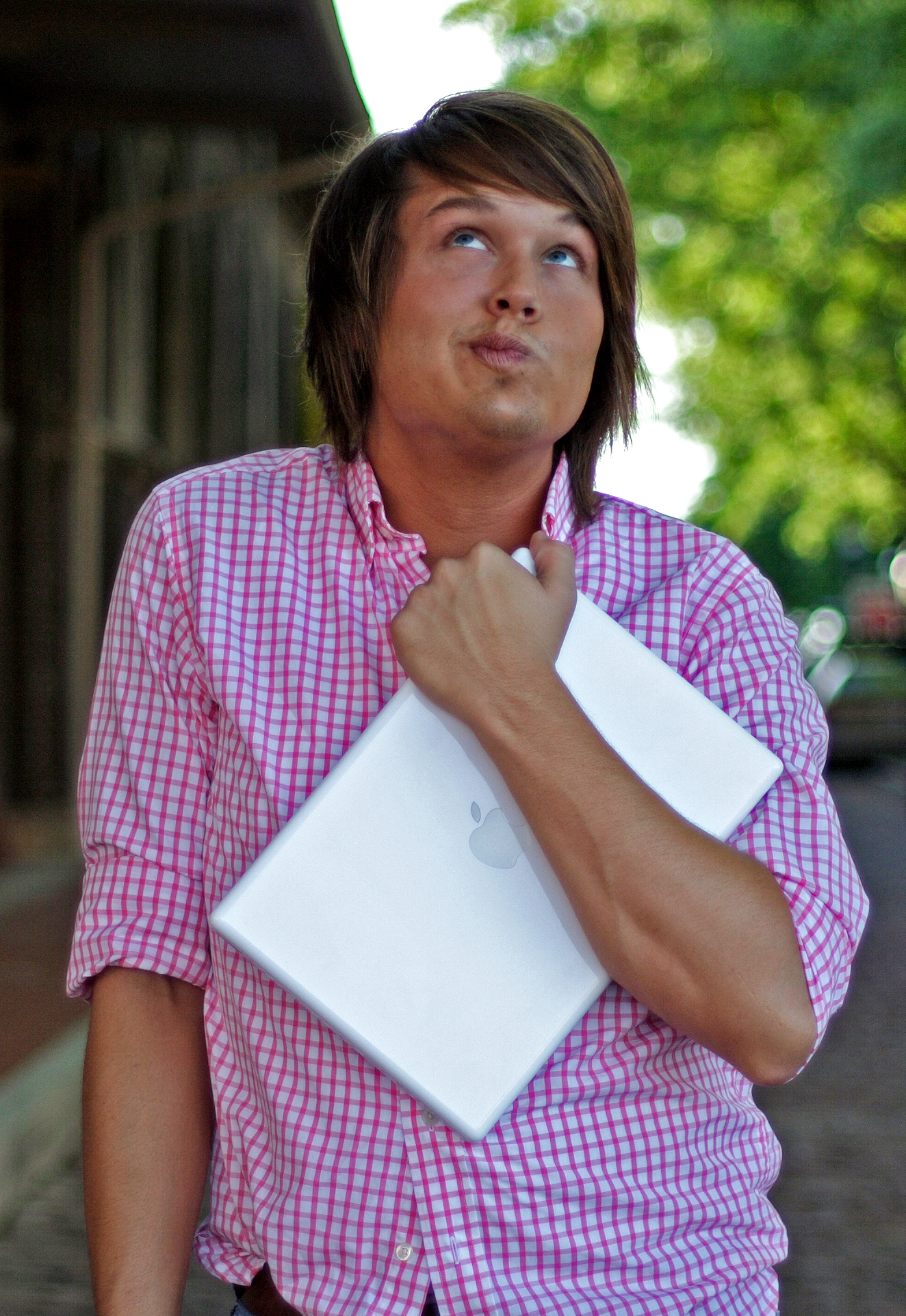
- Sledd in 2007
- Born: October 11, 1983 (age 43); Paducah, Kentucky, U.S.
- Other names: Will, WilliamSledd
- Years active: 2006 - 2013
- Spouse: Tom Maher (m. 2022)
- Website: www.youtube.com/user/WilliamSledd/

William Lynn Sledd (born October 11, 1983) is an American internet celebrity and former video blogger. His vlogs, which included the popular "Ask A Gay Man" series launched in 2006, made him one of the first YouTube celebrities. William's YouTube videos focus on his work as a social media manager and also frequent his own personal interest in fashion and style.

Sledd lives in Paducah, Kentucky, and most recently has been a social media manager for a bank.

== YouTube vlogging ==
Sledd got an iMac in 2004/2005 and started experimenting with making videos. He self-taught his video skills. He says he did not have a set goal but was speaking his mind on fashion, also it was like a secret diary when he first started, unknown to anyone in his hometown. He first posted almost weekly, and asked viewers to submit questions which become the subjects of future episodes. Subsequently, he posted every two weeks, and each video ran four to five minutes.

Each of Sledd's videos regularly achieved in excess of 50,000 views and as of July 2007, his most popular video "Ask A Gay Man: Denim Edition" had attracted over 3,000,000 views. He puts a lot of work into each video, the Los Angeles Times noted his 4 1/2-minute denim video took four hours just to shoot. As an openly gay man, he explains the latest trends in fashion and occasionally goes on location to point out fashion "don'ts" as part of his Fashion Victim editions.

His Ask a Gay Man: Fashion Edition, was the fourth-most subscribed to blog on YouTube in April 2007, and was nominated for best series in the first YouTube Awards. In February 2008, Sledd was the 12th most subscribed user of all time and the sixth most subscribed advertising partner of all time. According to Social Blade's YouTube statistics Sledd, as of January 2014, has nearly 88,000 subscribers, and nearly 25 million views although that total does not include views before his channel was hacked in 2006.

Sledd was one of the fastest growing and most viewed director/bloggers on YouTube, ranking in the top ten Most Subscribed (All Time) category as of November 2006. On September 23, 2006, his personal YouTube account was illegally hacked and all his content (including videos, comments, honours, etc.) was deleted. Sledd then recorded a brief response to the criminals and went on to re-upload select videos.

On June 1, 2007, he posted a video to celebrate Gay and Lesbian Pride Month asking for viewers to respond with their own pride stories or even to come out, there was an "outpouring" of support. Sledd states he gets many emails from young gay and lesbian teenagers that see him as a role model. The Advocate magazine noted that along with other openly gay YouTube celebrities, Sledd's rising fame also brought a lot of anti-gay commenters, which it ascribed to John Gabriel's Greater Internet Fuckwad Theory. It regards the online disinhibition effect, in which Internet users exhibit unsociable tendencies while interacting with other Internet users. Krahulik and Holkins suggest that, given both anonymity and an audience, an otherwise regular person becomes aggressively antisocial. In 2013, Holkins gave the corollary that "Normal Person – Consequences + Audience = Total Fuckwad".

In September 2007, "The Top (& Bottom) Gays of You Tube!", the first all-gay collaboration video by YouTube's most subscribed video bloggers, was posted by Michael Buckley ("What The Buck?!") to create a "YouTube gay village." Featuring Cara Cunningham in a heavily affected persona, William Sledd, and "Gay God" (Matthew Lush), the video consisted of each of the four bloggers commenting on the others' vlogging, with Buckley acting as host for the various outtakes. In February 2008, the channels were among the most popular on YouTube when "What The Buck?!" was 6th, Crocker's channel 8th, Sledd 13th and "Gay God" in 25th. As of January 2014, the video has been viewed over 1,218,300 times, with over 9,000 comments.

In 2007 he was offered a deal to produce an original Bravo series for Ask a Gay Man Anything, the network had been building its reality show and online properties including "seven show-specific mobile Web sites" in conjunction with Time Warner Cable. It premiered in June 2007. Later that year he was offered his own reality-show, and shot pilot episodes, documenting his rising fame and possible move to the fashion world in New York City. Ultimately Bravo folded OutZoneTV.com and focussed online funding to derivative efforts rather than original series.

== Fame beyond YouTube ==
Sledd's fame grew outside the YouTube community thanks to the recognition of various television and magazine media. His "rookie fashion critiquing" made it into Women's Wear Daily, Elle, and Glamour. On November 2, 2006, Women's Wear Daily published an article about Sledd and his "Ask a Gay Man" videos. They followed up a year later in December 2007 with a feature about being a cyberstar.

In broadcast television Sledd made appearances on nationally syndicated shows like Rachael Ray (September 9, 2007), and the Tyra Banks Show (January 15, 2009). Among the celebrities that Sledd has gotten to meet, he has a growing friendship with two-time Tony Award-winning actress Christine Ebersole. He has flown to New York to celebrate her birthday with her and to see her perform in the Broadway musical Grey Gardens. She has also made a guest appearance in his video titled Christine Ebersole Defends Sweatpants. Sledd also partook in a YouTube-style interview with Glamour's fashion editor Suze Yalof Schwartz, in which Schwartz asked him several questions based around his videos and fashion advice. On July 1, 2007, Sledd won the first ever Flamingo Award for Outstanding Gayness in the category of "Best Video Blog" for the "Ask a Gay Man: Denim Edition" series.

== See also ==
- List of YouTube celebrities
