= Olga Kay =

Russian internet personality (born 1982)

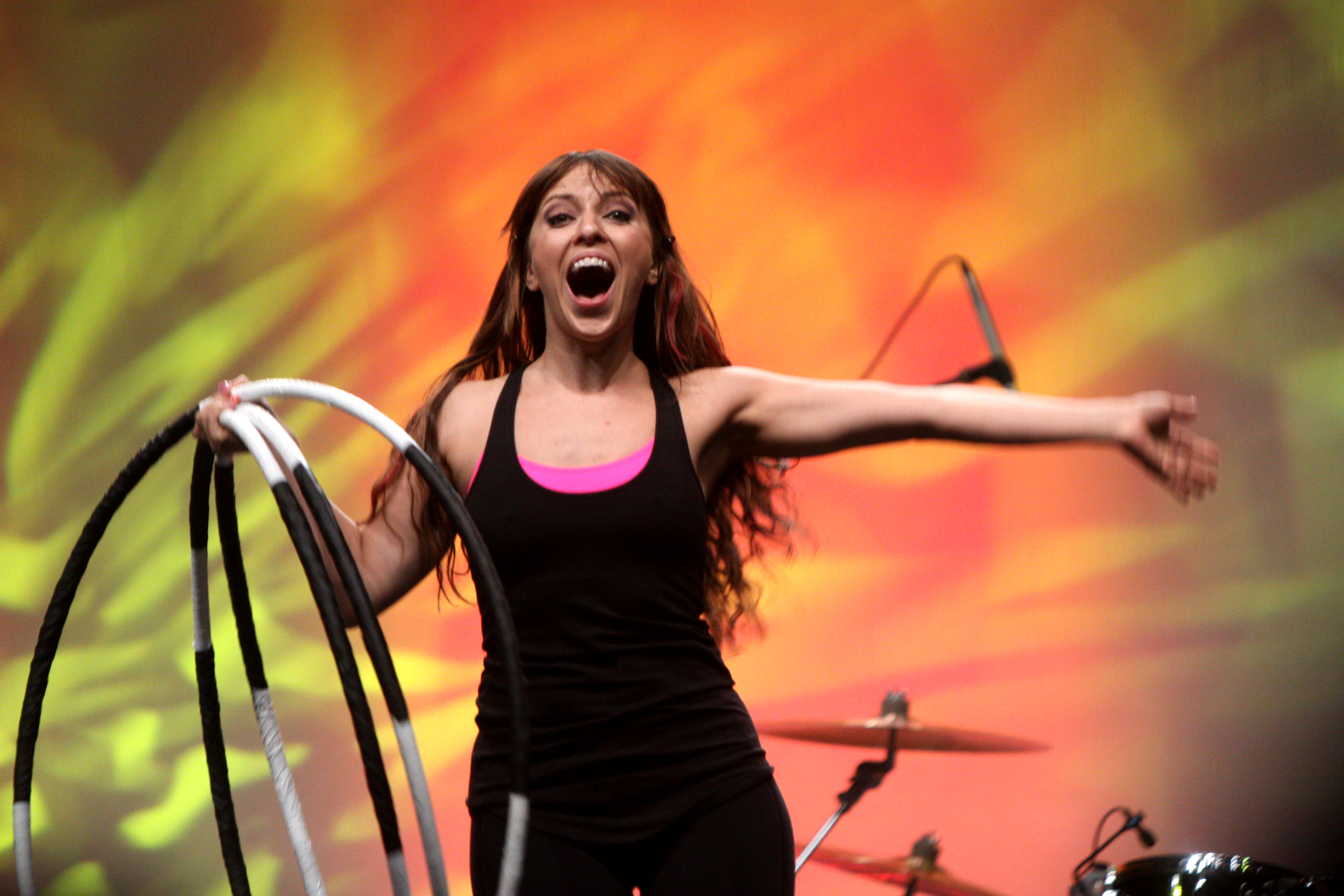
- Kay performing at VidCon 2012
- Born: Olga Sergeyevna Karavaeva; November 20, 1982 (age 43); Crimea, Ukrainian SSR, USSR
- Notable work: Video blog
- Children: 1

Comedy career
- Years active: 1998–present
- Medium: Video blog, television
- Genres: Comedian, writer, director, performer, entrepreneur
- Website: mooshworld.com

Olga Kay (born Olga Sergeyevna Karavaeva; Russian: Ольга Сергеевна Караваева; November 20, 1982) is a Russian-American Internet celebrity (mainly known as a YouTube personality), performer and entrepreneur. Trained as a professional circus juggler in her youth, she later moved to acting and video creation. In 2006 she started the YouTube channel OlgaKay, creating shows such as Emo Girl and Olga Kay's Show. Adding channels on gaming and fashion, by 2013 her four combined channels had approximately a million subscribers.

She has appeared in web shows such as MyMusic and Annoying Orange, and hosted the Rogue Pictures web show Tube Top, as well as collaborating with entertainers such as Joe Nation and Shane Dawson.

In 2014, Kay's YouTube Channel was listed on New Media Rockstars Top 100 Channels, ranked at #47.

In 2014, Kay launched her media and retail company Moosh Walks, to encourage an entrepreneurial spirit in her female fan base.

As of March 2016, Kay finalized her naturalization as an American citizen, thus holding dual citizenship.

== Early life ==
Olga Karavaeva was born on November 20, 1982, in Stepne, Ukrainian SSR, Soviet Union (now Crimea). She performed professionally with a circus in Moscow as a teenager, before moving to the United States to work with the Ringling Brothers Circus.

== Career ==
=== Performing, internet channels ===
After settling in Los Angeles, around 2004 she acted and juggled in television shows such as CSI: NY and The Benvenuti Family. She also started attending various YouTube events, co-promoting her online videos with other YouTubers such as Shay Carl, SxePhil, and CTFxC. In 2006 she started her YouTube comedy channel Olga Kay, followed in 2009 Olga Kay 2, which focuses on behind-the-scenes videos. Among her recurring shows are Olga Kay's Show and Emo Girl, where she plays a comedic emo version of herself known as Razor Blade. She later developed a third channel, Olga Kay Games, which presents video games in a comedic way.

Her fourth channel Mooshville is focused on fashion and beauty, with the brand name Moosh stemming from a nickname for her cat. Mooshville features What’s in my Purse?, filmed at the YouTube sound stage in Playa Vista, California, and the Pajama Party show, a makeup review show that has had guests such as Hannah Hart, Taryn Southern and Shane Dawson. Moosh is also the name of a custom brand of shoes named Mooshoos, which she created using feedback from fans.

The YouTube channels have approximately 1.2 million subscribers combined, as of July 2015.

On October 31, 2015, Olga started her successful series Will It Juggle?, which she announced at the first annual Stream Con NYC. In the series, she takes viewers' suggestions of items to juggle, usually succeeding due to her circus roots.

=== Collaborations ===
Kay has appeared as herself in a number of documentaries and webisodes, including the feature film Butterflies in 2009. In 2011 she had appearances in Shane Dawson TV, JoeNationTV, Annoying Orange, and in 2012 acted in YouTube's original channel initiative show MyMusic as a raver character. She hosted the Rogue Pictures web show Tube Top, which recognizes the top shows/videos on YouTube.

She appeared in some Your Grammar Sucks videos by Jack Douglass and collaborated with him on the short comedy video "Olga Kay: How to control your dreams!" in 2011, and in 2012 Toby Turner starred in a short with Kay entitled "Olga Kay Goes Haywire".

She has performed at VidCon and was interviewed in the podcasts New Mediacracy and Rhett and Link's Ear Biscuits. Brands she has worked with include Microsoft, Ford, Google, Relativity Media, Axe, Capcom, Nintendo, Virgin Mobile, Xbox, and others.

== Business ==
Kay launched Moosh Walks, a media and retail brand that aims to empower young girls through storytelling, primarily about leadership. In 2014, Kay released her first characters as a line of 3D socks. The knee high socks feature numerous character designs and external ears. Kay said she created socks with ears because she didn't want to be another YouTuber with a logo on a T-shirt. Kay immediately recouped her initial investment in manufacturing the socks through a pre-order campaign. Moosh Walks were featured in the style lounge at the 2015 Emmy Awards. As of January 2016, Kay now has unisex socks and baby socks, and is developing pillows in collaboration with Throwboy. In 2017, Kay introduced a new sock character, Mushka, based on her cat and the inspiration for her brand name.

In 2018, Moosh Walks was featured as one of the top women owned business on Amazon.

== Filmography ==
=== Film and TV ===
Year	Title	Role	Notes, Episodes
2005	CSI: NY	Susan Young / Juggler #2	Episodes: "Crime and Misdemeanor" and "Blood, Sweat, and Tears"
2007	The Benvenuti Family	Mrs. Avery	Television
2008	Spike Guys Choice	Herself	
2009	Butterflies	Herself	Feature documentary
2011	Victorious	Cat Valentine	Episode: "Helen Back Again", Ariana Grande's juggling double
2015	Wiener Dog Internationals	Darya	
2015	Bob Thunder: Internet Assassin	Olga Kay	

=== Web ===
Year	Title	Role	Notes
2009-2011	Olga Kay's Show	Herself	Kay handles writing, production, and editing on video shorts with Joe Nation, Jessica Lizama, Betsy Ullery, etc.
2009-2010	Emo Girl	Razor Blade	Kay handled writing, production, and editing.
2009-2010	Shane Dawson TV	Dancer, Daisy, Jennifer	Episodes: "Strip for Your Life", "Movie Freak", "Talking Fruit from Hell"
2010	"Olga Kay's Circus"	Herself	Short film directed by Andrea Ball, written by Wyatt Pascoe, and produced by Lux New Media
2010	The 2nd Annual Streamy Awards	Herself	
2011	YouTube Assassin	Hypnotized Chick #1	Episodes: "Shane Dawson, Part 2"
2011	Black Box TV	Deumos	Episodes: "Deumos Kisses"
2011	ExoticJess	Helga	
2010	The Web.Files	Herself	Episode: "Buzz 2"
2011	JoeNationTV	Herself	Episode: "Shut the Hell Up"
2011	Victorious	Cat's Juggling Double	Episode: "Helen Back Again"
2011	Tube Top	Herself	Episode: "It Factor"
2011	Annoying Orange	Lettuce	Episode: "Kitchen Carnage"
2011	Corey & Lucas for the Win!	Herself	Episode: "One Perfect Moment"
2012	"Olga Kay Goes Haywire"	Herself	Video short produced by Roguelife, directed by Damon O'Steen
2012-2013	MyMusic	Raver #2	Episodes: "Don't Panic! At the Disco", "Mystery Solved!", "Raver Madness!", "Ghosts!!!", "Origins"
2012	Chug, Plug & Review	Herself	
2013	Tweet Out	Herself	Episode: "Olga Kay"
2013	The Mythical Show	Herself	Episode: "Smosh & Star Trek"
2013-2014	Ladies of Rap	Bill Clinton Robber, Rogue	Episodes ''Gotham Sirens'', ''Marvel Mavens''
2014	Photobomb	Herself	Episodes #1.2 #1.4 #1.6
2015	Terminator Genisys: The YouTube Chronicles	Herself	2 episodes
2015	Wrestling Isn't Wrestling	Theater Audience Member	Short film
2015	Room Tour Challenge	Herself	Episode ''Emoji Challenge Ft. Olga Kay''
2015	Fight of the Living Dead	Contestant	Episode ''Pilot''
2015	Oscar's Hotel For Fantastical Creatures	Mo Nay Lisa	Episodes ''Hunger Pains'', ''Death's Hotel'', ''The Fountain of Forgetfulness'', ''Art Attack'', ''Fishy Business''
