= BlogTV =

Former live-streaming video blog service

- Company type: Private
- Website type: Video chat, Webcasting
- Founded: June 2004; 22 years ago
- Dissolved: 2013
- Headquarters: Ramat Gan, Israel, Mission Viejo, California; United States (2016–2017)
- Area served: Worldwide
- Founders: Ilan Ben-Dov; Dan Chen Guy Eliav; Nir Ofir; Oren Levy
- Registration: None
- Current status: Defunct

BlogTV was a live-streaming video blog service. It was first established in Ramat Gan, Israel in January 2004 by founders Ilan Ben-Dov, Dan Chen, Guy Eliav, Nir Ofir, and Oren Levy as a webcasting company. The service is operated under the Tapuz brand. BlogTV's goals were to provide a means for anyone with Internet access to express their talents and ideas to the world. In 2006 BlogTV launched its Canadian activity under the name BlogTV.ca. BlogTV.com was officially launched in June 2007 in the US and the rest of the world. Users could create live video shows, interact with their audiences or invite co-hosts (adults only) to join their show over the internet or by using WAP. The broadcasters were able to broadcast to their audience with a webcam. The platform also included a chat system. The site had a promotional partnership with ICQ, an IM platform. YouNow acquired BlogTV.com on March 13, 2013.

== History ==
=== BlogTV.com and Merger with YouNow (2004–2013) ===
In February 2008, BlogTV.com launched the first live user-generated content for mobile phones. Handset owners could watch live content that was being produced and broadcast on BlogTV.com.

In July 2008, blogTV launched its Russian site. Worldwide BlogTV has a partnership with ICQ, which established a promotional partnership with the BlogTV Russian site. ICQ was one of the first IM platforms and was widely used in Europe, Israel and in Russia. The Russian site had its own personal community manager, similar to worldwide BlogTV.

In December 2008, BlogTV began its Video Ad Revenue Share Program. With a set of criteria to apply, only certain people were able to participate in this program. However, despite the limitation it still generated 50% of the ad revenue from live shows, videos and embedded shows.

In February 2009, BlogTV introduced a new type of account, Pro. This allowed users to host private shows, generate new emoticons, and expand recording space to 30 minutes per recording (500 minutes total).

On March 4, 2009, BlogTV released its junior channel. This was for users between the ages of 13 and 15. The junior members could only broadcast to other junior users (age 13–15), and junior members could only view junior members' profiles. Guests were not allowed to enter the chat room, and no co-hosting or inviting a co-host was allowed. Other features for the junior members included no private message options, and no ability to change the age of a junior member to move into a regular member account type. For the regular members they are also not given the right to change their age to a junior member profile (to watch other junior members).

On September 16, 2009, BlogTV launched their 1.0 version of their toolbar. On June 29, 2010, the site released its 2.0 version of the toolbar, with many more features. Initially, the toolbar was only available for Internet Explorer, Firefox and the Firefox related browsers with the ability to use Firefox Add-ons Epic Browser and Wyzo.

In 2010, a then-moderator of Battlecam.com and now YouTube personality known as DJ Keemstar attacked a fellow moderator named Alex, calling him a "fucking nigger" while streaming with his hands up on BlogTV. He later told users in chat to type "Alex is a stupid nigger".

On March 13, 2013, it was announced that BlogTV would merge with the live streaming company YouNow. Those with BlogTV accounts were able to merge with YouNow and keep their username, recordings, social connections, and registration date. Those with Pro BlogTV accounts could claim more YouNow benefits, such as a higher level or extra coins, or could claim a refund on the remaining months of the Pro account. In addition, all BlogTV staff continue to work with YouNow. As of March 2013, BlogTV.com ceased to exist and redirected to YouNow.

=== BlogTV.ca (2016–2017) ===
On January 26, 2016, it was announced that BlogTV would become active again under the domain BlogTV.ca by new owners Madcow Media, LLC.

On September 26, 2016, BlogTV.ca ran an “Open House” alpha test where the community could sign up to an early build of the BlogTV site and chat in a developer livestream. The open house alpha test ran for two days, and its main purpose was to stress test servers before the website went into closed beta testing for further development.

In April 2017, the BlogTV project was cancelled due to funding.

== See also ==
- Streaming media
- YouTube Live
- Lifecasting
- Social network
