= Letters from Home (song) =

Single by John Michael Montgomery

from the album Letters from Home
- Released: February 2, 2004
- Genre: Country
- Length: 4:28
- Label: Warner Bros. Nashville
- Songwriters: Tony Lane, David Lee
- Producers: Byron Gallimore, John Michael Montgomery

John Michael Montgomery singles chronology
"Cool" (2003)	"Letters from Home" (2004)	"Goes Good with Beer" (2004)

"Letters from Home" is a song written by Tony Lane and David Lee, and recorded by American country music singer John Michael Montgomery. It was released in February 2004 as the second single and title track from the album of the same name. It peaked at number 2 on the Billboard Hot Country Singles & Tracks chart in 2004 and also reached number 24 on the Billboard Hot 100, his highest-ever peak on that chart.

== Background and writing ==
Co-writer David Lee got the idea after seeing a soldier and his girlfriend saying goodbye at the airport.

== Content ==
The song is a portrayal of a soldier's life on overseas duty. In the song, it is mentioned how the soldier's mother and girlfriend write to him during his time overseas. In the first two letters (the first two verses), the letters are shared with a fair share of merriment among the soldier's comrades. The soldier's father is a very stubborn man in the song, but eventually admits to being proud of his son, which drives the son to tears and spreads an aura of solemnity among his comrades, as mentioned in the third verse.

== Music video ==
The music video, directed by Darrin Dickerson, was filmed at the Army Aviation Support Facility No. 1 in Smyrna, Tenn, and featured National Guard soldiers. Actor and musician Freddy Mullins played the role of the soldier receiving the letters from home.

== Chart positions ==
"Letters from Home" debuted at number 48 on the U.S. Billboard Hot Country Songs chart for the week of January 31, 2004 and peaked at number 2 for four weeks, behind Gretchen Wilson's "Redneck Woman".

=== Weekly charts ===
Chart (2004)	Peak position
Canada Country (Radio & Records)	4
US Hot Country Songs (Billboard)	2
US Billboard Hot 100	24

=== Year-end charts ===
Chart (2004)	Position
US Billboard Hot 100	99
US Country Songs (Billboard)	5
