= Ester Brymová =

Czech filmmaker (born 1978)

- Born: September 4, 1978 (age 47); Prague, Czechoslovakia
- Occupations: film director, producer

Ester Brymová (pronounced bree-maw-va) (born 4 September 1978), also Ester Brym is a film director, producer and editor.

== Biography ==
In 1997 she moved to New York City to pursue studies in film-making. She worked as an editor in independent cinema until 2008 when she decided to move to Los Angeles to direct her first feature film “Butterflies”.

Butterflies, a documentary about YouTubers, is the first film that puts YouTube on a big screen and introduces the world of new and social media. "Butterflies is the first film, that profiles the life of Internet celebrity as a new phenomenon," says journalist Veronika Bednářová in her article in Reflex.

Butterflies has premiered at Action on Film International Film Festival in Pasadena, California on 27 July 2009 and have won the Alan J. Bailey Excellence Award in Documentary Filmmaking. It was also nominated for Best Social Commentary. It showed at ArcLight's first ever Documentary Festival written up by LA Times.

Brym's short film 12 Hours was composed of footage that was shot for Ridley Scott's Life in a Day, which Brym took part at. 12 Hours showed at 2011 Action on Film Festival and Valley Film Festival reviewed by Fred Topel the film critic.

Brym's next film Autumn of Route 66 (2013) received the Best Female Filmmaker Feature award and placed as runner up for Best Picture at Action on Film Festival. The film also got great following from the Route 66 community and screened at the International Route 66 festival in Kingman, Arizona.

Her newest film Not Your Skin was finished in the beginning of 2018 and is currently showing at the film festival circuit.

Brym currently works at Lionsgate.
