= Black20 =

American digital production studio

- Industry: Entertainment industry
- Founded: 2007; 19 years ago in New York City, New York, United States
- Founder: J. Crowley; Neil Punsalan; Nelson Castro
- Defunct: June 14, 2010
- Headquarters: New York City, New York, United States
- Website: black20.com at the Wayback Machine (archived 2010-04-30)

Black20 was an American digital production studio founded by J. Crowley, Neil Punsalan, and Nelson Castro. The company operated out of Long Island City, Queens, New York. The company, which launched in 2007, created web series including net_work and The Middle Show. The company also produces viral videos. Some of their biggest hits include 300: PG Version (10M views), I Am A Building: net_work (3.6M views), Star Wars PSA: Vader Dad (3.3M views), and Naked Gay Ted: net_work (3.3M views).

Jeff Jarvis is an angel investor in the company. Fox Television Studios acquired a part of the company in an effort to enhance their comedy development for television.

Their content can be viewed on Hulu and the Black20 YouTube channel. The group has been inactive since 2011.

The last video published on their channel before a 12-year gap was on 14 June 2010. Two 14-year old videos were published on their channel after this break, both on 14 January 2022.

== Web series ==
- net_work was an office webisode series starring Mike O'Gorman and Michael Torpey. In the show, they work at a start-up company called Black20 producing internet hits. Recurring characters on the show include Dean "the Werewolf", Troy, Stacy, and Tom, "the coolest guy in the office", played by Thomas Edward Seymour.
- The Middle Show is a weekly series featuring David Price as he interviews people in and around the neighborhood. Some of their well-known hits include "Alec Baldwin's Daughter Calls Back" and "The Singing Jogger". Price is usually assisted by Ted O'Gorman and Pat Driscoll.
- "Heart Felt" is a reality show focused on the troubled lives of puppets and people.
- Overdubbed is a clip show with the sound track altered.
- After These Messages is Black20's take on popular commercials and new products.
- Secret Lives is a viral series that shows the true side of fictional characters such as the Easter Bunny and Santa Claus.

== Award nominations ==
Two of Black20's web-series, net_work and Sheffield Quigley: Professional MySpace Photographer, were nominated for Best Broadband Web-Series at the 2007 Creative Arts and Entertainment Emmys.

Net_work was nominated for the 2007 YouTube Awards in the category of Best Series.

Dave Price, the host of The Middle Show, won tvweek.com's 2008 Sexiest Male Web Host on Daisy Whitney's blog.
