= Battle at Kruger =

Amateur wildlife viral video

Battle at Kruger is an eight-minute amateur wildlife video that depicts a confrontation between a herd of Cape buffalo, a small group of young lions from a pride, and two crocodiles. The video was shot in September 2004 at the Transport Dam watering hole in Kruger National Park, South Africa, during a safari guided by Frank Watts. It was filmed by videographer David Budzinski and photographer Jason Schlosberg.

Since being posted on YouTube on 3 May 2007, Battle at Kruger has received over 90 million views as of 2023 and has become a viral video sensation. It was widely praised for its dramatic depiction of wildlife on the African savannah. It has since become one of YouTube's most popular nature videos, and has won the Best Eyewitness Video in the 2nd Annual YouTube Video Awards. The video was also the subject of an article in the 25 June 2007 issue of Time magazine, and was featured in the first episode of ABC News' i-Caught, which aired on 7 August 2007. A National Geographic documentary on the video debuted on the National Geographic Channel on 11 May 2008.

== Background ==
Taken from a small game viewer vehicle on the opposite side of the watering hole with a digital camcorder, the video begins with the herd of African buffalo approaching the water, unaware that a small group of lionesses are lying nearby. The lions crouch as the herd nears; it is uncertain if the lions attack first, or the lead buffalo becomes startled and turns to run, but the buffalo flee and the lions charge and disperse the herd, with a lion picking off a buffalo calf, both of them falling into the water. As the lions try to drag the buffalo calf out of the water, the calf is grabbed by two crocodiles, who fight for it in a brief tug of war before giving up and leaving it to the lions. The lions then lie down and prepare to feast, but the fully regrouped buffalo herd approach and surround the lions. One of the buffalo starts the confrontation by swiping at and chasing off a lion. This buffalo then returns, charges a second time, tossing another one of the lions into the air before chasing it away. While the remaining lions are intimidated by the initial engagement, the still alive buffalo calf struggles free of the lions' restraint and escapes into the herd. The buffalo then aggressively proceed to scatter and drive away the remaining lions one by one.

== Expert commentary ==
Two veterinarians and animal behaviorists interviewed by Time assert that the mobbing behavior exhibited by the buffalo is not unusual. Dr. Sue McDonnell of the University of Pennsylvania School of Veterinary Medicine said of the video:

The larger herd is broken down into smaller harems, with a dominant male and many females and their babies. If a youngster is threatened, both the harem males and bachelor males—which usually fight with one another—will get together to try to rescue it.

It is, however, rare for such events to be captured on film even by professional wildlife photographers. Indeed, Dereck Joubert, a photographer and writer for National Geographic said of the video:

There is no doubt at all that the tourist who shot that scene ... was unbelievably lucky. I mean, we would've considered ourselves lucky to have had that whole scene happen in front of us.
