= Don Dodge =

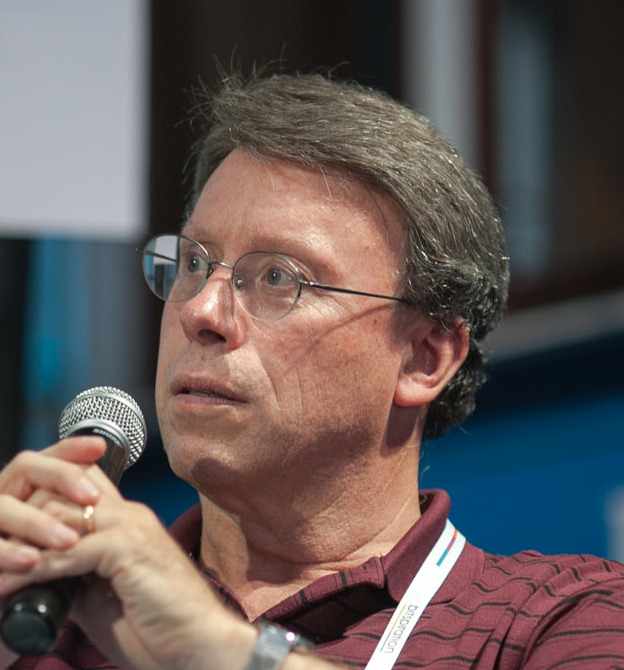
- Occupation: IT executive

Don Dodge (born 1957) is a Developer Advocate for Google, which requires that he helps developers build applications on the company's platforms. Prior to working at Google, Dodge was a start-up evangelist at Microsoft, where he was one of their most visible employees following Robert Scoble's departure in 2006.

== Biography ==
Dodge received a Bachelor of Science from the University of Southern Maine, majoring in accounting. Afterward, he received an MBA from New Hampshire College (now Southern New Hampshire University). Following graduation, Dodge worked at a number of technology companies, including Digital Equipment, Forte Software, AltaVista, Napster, and Bowstreet. Afterward, he worked at Groove Networks. When the company was acquired by Microsoft, Dodge became Director of Business Development for Microsoft's Emerging Business Team. He was also known as a "start-up evangelist" for Microsoft. Focusing on the New England area and based in New Hampshire, Dodge often worked specifically with companies in the greater Boston area, to help them use Microsoft products for their companies. Dodge felt positively towards Ray Ozzie, CEO of Groove Networks, who replaced Bill Gates as Chief Software Architect at Microsoft following Gates' retirement announcement.

Dodge was laid off from Microsoft on November 5, 2009, and then he became a Developer Advocate for Google, where he helps developers build applications on Google's platforms, as well as help venture capitalists and start-up companies work with Google. After moving to Google, Dodge switched from using a Windows-based computer to a Mac-based one, a move which he enjoys greatly. In 2010, Dodge compared Google to Microsoft when it was a ten-year-old company, indicating that it still had a lot of growth ahead of it. Dodge writes a personal blog called "The Next Big Thing".
