= YouNow =

American live broadcasting service company

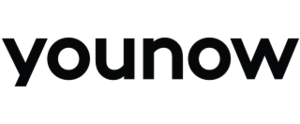
- Website type: Broadcasting, podcasting
- Available in: 15 languages
- Founder: Adi Sideman
- CEO: Jon Brodsky
- Website: www.younow.com
- Commercial: Yes
- Registration: Optional
- Launched: September 12, 2011; 15 years ago

YouNow is an American live streaming broadcasting service where users stream their own live video content or interact with the video streams of other users in real time. The service is available on its website and on Android and iOS apps.

As of 2015, the majority of the users of YouNow are under 24 years old. Many users perform music, game, engage with their fans, or dance. Others talk or make jokes. A tag-based topic system enables viewers to browse content of their choice, while trending streams enable users to locate more popular webcasters.

As of August 2015, the service handled 150,000 broadcasts each day. It competes with apps like TikTok, Twitch, and Instagram Live.

== History ==
YouNow was founded by Adi Sideman on September 12, 2011 but significantly grew in popularity during 2014 and 2015 following significant changes to the service. A round of funding in 2015 raised $15 million from venture capitalists.

YouNow bought live streaming company BlogTV.com in 2013, with user accounts being merged into YouNow.

MTV partnered with YouNow for the 2014 MTV Video Music Awards. The Huffington Post has started streaming a live show on YouNow weekly since August 2015.

The Shorty Awards featured a "YouNower of the Year" category in 2016 and 2017.

America's Got Talent partnered with YouNow to hold auditions for Season 11 with the final auditions on YouNow held live in YouNow HQ on Times Square, on March 1, 2016.

In 2017, YouNow began losing user broadcasters, including many partnered users and their fans, to other social media apps including Live.me and Twitch. Many of the young social media influencers that made the app popular began leaving and YouNow's audience began shrinking and trending much older.

In 2019, in an attempt to bring user broadcasters and fans back, YouNow developed and implemented similar features that Live.me and Twitch already had on their social media platforms. These similar features included high definition resolution broadcasting, the ability to assign chat moderators and the ability to have multiple guest broadcasters (up to 3) at the same time with the broadcaster. Gold bars replaced likes as the in-app currency on the lower priced YouNow gifts at time of this redesign. YouNow also introduced a new platform rewards system in the form of Props.

On the 11th January 2021, YouNow changed over from the Prop system, introducing Diamonds, a new way for non-partner users to earn.

== Safety features and moderation ==
In order to improve online safety within the community, YouNow uses a combination of automated systems and manual monitoring. YouNow continuously monitors broadcasts for violations to the community standards and site rules or the terms of service.

YouNow offers a variety of safety features, including the ability to block other users, silence users within the chat feature, and flag inappropriate conduct to alert YouNow's moderation team. YouNow can suspend or remove an account for conduct that is determined to be inappropriate or harmful.

YouNow has stricter rules for those under 18 and adults interacting with minors on the platform and reports all incidents related to child victimization to the NCMEC.

== Features ==
=== Partnership ===
YouNow has a partner program that allows popular broadcasters to earn money. Virtual goods bought by viewers are used to acclaim videos; the resulting revenue is split between YouNow and the video creator, with about 60% going to the latter.

Partnership is offered to accounts in good standing at YouNow's discretion.
