= Reel (disambiguation) =

A reel is an object around which lengths of another material are wound for storage.

Reel or Reels may also refer to:

- Reel (dance), a type of dance and its accompanying music
- Reel (horse), a thoroughbred racehorse and prolific broodmare
- Reel (people), an ethnic group of Sudan
  - Reel language, or Atwot, a Nilotic language of South Sudan that is closely related to Nuer
- Reel (poetry collection), a collection of poetry by George Szirtes
- The Reels, an Australian rock pop group
- Reel Cinemas, a cinema chain in the United Arab Emirates
- Reel Cinemas (UK), a cinema chain in the United Kingdom
- Reel Corporation, an Australian film distributor
- Reel Theatres, a cinema chain in the USA
- Fishing reel, a device used on a fishing rod to wind the fishing line up
- Showreel, a piece of video or film footage that displays an actor's work
- KQZR-FM "The Reel", a Colorado radio station
- Reel, a part of a slot machine
- Reelz, an American television network
- Instagram Reels or Facebook Reels, short-form video sharing features by Reels (Meta)

== See also ==
- Leica reel, a type of storyboarding device in animation
- Réel, a 2009 album by Kery James
- Reel Life (disambiguation)
- Reel to reel (disambiguation)
- Newsreel
