= Kery James =

French-Haitian rapper (born 1977)

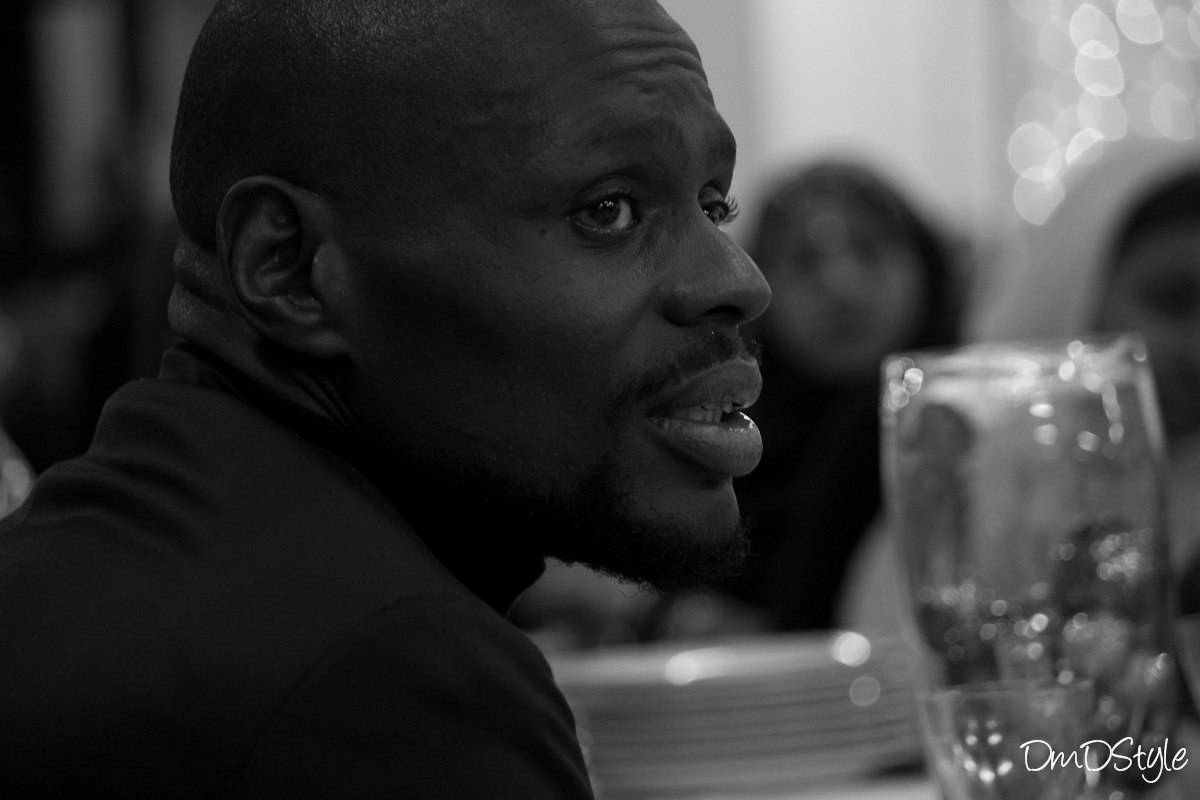
- James in 2017

Background information
- Born: Alix Mathurin; 28 December 1977 (age 48); Les Abymes, Guadeloupe
- Genres: French hip hop, hardcore hip hop, conscious hip hop
- Occupations: Rapper, songwriter, singer, dancer, record producer, screenwriter, playwright, actor
- Years active: 1992–present
- Formerly of: Idéal J, Mafia K-1 Fry
- Website: keryjamesofficiel.com

Alix Mathurin (French pronunciation: [aliks matyˈʁɛ̃]) (born 28 December 1977), publicly known as Kery James, is a French-Haitian rapper, singer, actor, director, and screenwriter from Les Abymes, Guadeloupe. His music often addresses suburban life and social inequalities in contemporary France. He was a member of the rap collectives Idéal J and Mafia K-1 Fry.

== Career ==
=== Idéal J (1991–1999) ===
James began his rap career in 1991 as a co-founder of the group Idéal J, with DJ Mehdi joining as a producer the following year. The group released the singles "Hardcore" and "Pour une poignée de dollars", followed by their debut album, Original MC's sur une mission. In 1992, they released the single "La vie est brutale", and Alter MC (later known as Jessy Money) left the group. In subsequent years, as DJ Mehdi developed as a producer, James increasingly focused on writing material addressing subjects such as confrontations with police, street rivalries, and the fear of death.

In 1996, Idéal J released the singles "Ghetto français", "Show Business," and "Je veux du cas"." The group also appeared on several EPs and as featured artists on recordings by other musicians. Their single "J'désole mes parents" was featured on the compilation album Nouvelle Donne. Idéal J disbanded in 1999 following the death of Las Montana, a close friend of James, leading him to take a hiatus from his musical career.

=== Solo musical career ===
In October 2001, after a two-year break, James released his debut solo album, Si c'était à refaire (If I Had to Do It Again). The album features collaborations with Nubian musicians and Salif Keita. The music incorporates African, Arabic, and Cuban influences, using percussion and traditional instruments.

In 2005, after contributing the track "Je ne crois plus en l'illicite" ("I No Longer Believe in the Illicit") to the soundtrack for the film Illicite Projet, he released his second solo album, Ma vérité (My Truth). The album featured a guest appearance by Iron Sy. The lyrics addressed topics such as the Iraq War and reality television. He also collaborated with artists such as Diam's, Mélanie Giorgadès, and Amel Bent.

His third solo album, À l'ombre du show business (In the Shadow of Show Business), was released in 2008 and debuted at number three on the French charts in its first week.

In March 2008, he released his third studio album, À l'ombre du show business, the title track of which was a collaboration with chanson singer Charles Aznavour. In its first week of release, the album reached third place on the French charts with 24,459 albums sold. James worked with Luc Besson, Mathieu Kassovitz, J.G. Biggs, and Chris Macari to create music videos for the album's tracks.

In 2016, James released his sixth album, Mouhammad Alix.

=== Film career ===
James has also worked as an actor and director. In 2003, he appeared in the documentary Si tu roules avec la Mafia K'1 Fry (If You Roll with the Mafia K'1 Fry). Following the September 11 attacks in 2001, he directed Savoir et vivre ensemble (Know and Live Together), a project featuring rappers, singers, and athletes promoting unity. He appeared as a juror in the 2017 film À voix haute (Speak Up).

In 2019, his film Banlieusards (Street Flow) was released on Netflix, with the sequel premiering on Netflix on September 27, 2023. He co-wrote and directed both films with Leïla Sy.

== Personal life ==
James moved to France at age seven, where he began rapping, dancing, and writing. He was raised by his mother in Orly, a suburb of Paris. At the age of 10, he was noticed by MC Solaar in a cité (suburban housing estate) in the Paris area. According to James, the influence of Islam in his environment led him to adopt the name Ali.

== Discography ==
=== Albums and EPs ===
==== Solo studio albums ====
| Year | Album | Peak positions | | | Certifications |
| Year | Album | FR | BEL (Wa) | SWI | Certifications |
|---|---|---|---|---|---|
| 2001 | Si c'était à refaire | 5 | – | – | SNEP:Gold |
| 2004 | Savoir et vivre ensemble | 15 | 54 | 89 | |
| 2005 | Ma vérité | 8 | 69 | – | SNEP:Gold |
| 2008 | À l'ombre du show business | 3 | 27 | 59 | SNEP:Platinum |
| 2009 | Réel | 1 | 12 | 33 | SNEP:Platinum |
| 2012 | 92.2012 | 12 | 72 | – | |
| 2013 | Dernier MC | 3 | 9 | 47 | SNEP:Gold |
| 2016 | Mouhammad Alix | 3 | 6 | 16 | SNEP:Gold |
| 2018 | J'rap encore | 19 | 6 | 42 | |
| 2025 | R.A.P | 42 | – | – | |

Others

- 2013: Coffret integral

==== Live albums ====
| Year | Album | Peak positions | | | Certification |
| Year | Album | FR | BEL (Wa) | SUI | Certification |
|---|---|---|---|---|---|
| 2010 | À mon public | 30 | 81 | – | |

=== Other albums and EPs (collaborations) ===
with Idéal Junior / Idéal J

- 1992: La vie est brutale (Maxi-single) (credited to Ideal Junior)
- 1996: O'riginal MC's sur une mission (credited to Ideal J)
- 1998: Le Combat Continue (credited to Ideal J)

with Mafia K-1 Fry

- 1997: Les liens sacrés
- 1999: Légendaire
- 2003: La cerise sur le ghetto
- 2007: Jusqu'à la mort (+ reissue)

=== Singles ===
| Year | Single | Peak positions | | Album |
| Year | Single | FR | BEL (Wa) | Album |
|---|---|---|---|---|
| 2001 | "Y'a pas d'couleur" | 61 | – | Si c'était à refaire |
| 2004 | "Relève la tête" (Kery James presente Lino, AP, Diam's, Passi, Matt & Kool Shen) | 39 | – | Savoir et vivre ensemble |
| 2009 | "Le retour du rap français" | – | 22 (Ultratip) | Réel |
| 2012 | "Lettre à la République" | 33 | 40 (Ultratip) | 92-2012 |
| 2012 | "Dernier MC" | 133 | – | Dernier MC |
| 2013 | "Des mots" (featuring LFDV) | 177 | – | Dernier MC |
| 2013 | "À l'horizon" (featuring Corneille) | 82 | 31 (Ultratip) | Dernier MC |
| 2013 | "Contre nous" (featuring La Ligue: Youssoupha et Médine) | 145 | – | Dernier MC |
| 2013 | "Le mystère féminin" (featuring Imany) | 120 | 10 (Ultratip) | Dernier MC |
| 2013 | "94 c'est le Barça" | 141 | – | Dernier MC |
| 2016 | "Mouhammad Alix" | 78 | – | |
| 2016 | "N'importe quoi" | 154 | – | |
| 2016 | "Racailles" | 26 | – | |
| 2016 | "Vivre ou mourir ensemble" | 167 | – | |
| 2016 | "Musique nègre" (featuring Lino and Youssoupha) | 112 | – | |
| 2019 | "À qui la faute" (featuring Orelsan) | 94 | – | |

=== Collaborations ===
(Refer to relevant section in French Wikipedia)
