= Jeff Carson (album) =

Studio album by Jeff Carson
- Released: May 2, 1995
- Studio: K.D. Studios and Sound Stage Studios (Nashville, Tennessee)
- Genre: Country
- Length: 32:50
- Label: MCG/Curb
- Producer: Chuck Howard

Jeff Carson chronology
Jeff Carson (1995)	Butterfly Kisses (1997)

Singles from Jeff Carson
- 1. "Yeah Buddy" Released: March 28, 1995; 2. "Not on Your Love" Released: June 6, 1995; 3. "The Car" Released: October 17, 1995; 4. "Holdin' Onto Something" Released: March 2, 1996; 5. "That Last Mile" Released: May 14, 1996

Professional ratings
Review scores
Source	Rating
AllMusic	3/5 stars

Jeff Carson is the debut studio album by American country music artist Jeff Carson. It was released in 1995 on MCG/Curb Records, and features five singles: "Yeah Buddy," "Not on Your Love", "The Car", "Holdin' onto Somethin'", and "That Last Mile". "Not on Your Love" was a Number One hit on the Billboard Hot Country Singles & Tracks (now Hot Country Songs) charts in mid-1995, while "The Car" and "Holdin' on to Something" were both Top Ten hits in 1996.

"Holdin' Onto Somethin'" was also recorded by John Michael Montgomery on his self-titled album, while "If I Ain't Got You" was also recorded by Marty Stuart on his 1995 album The Marty Party Hit Pack.

== Track listing ==
No.	Title	Writer(s)	Length
1.	"Yeah Buddy"	Mark D. Sanders, Bob Regan	2:26
2.	"Not on Your Love"	Tony Martin, Troy Martin, Reese Wilson	3:21
3.	"Get a Guitar"	Sanders, Jeff Carson	2:46
4.	"Definite Possibilities"	Ed Hill, Richard Fagan	2:47
5.	"The Car"	C. Michael Spriggs, Gary Heyde	3:32
6.	"Betty's Takin' Judo"	Carson	2:59
7.	"Preachin' to the Choir"	Sanders, Bob DiPiero, John Jarrard	2:43
8.	"Me Too"	Carson	3:11
9.	"If I Ain't Got You"	Craig Wiseman, Trey Bruce	2:51
10.	"That Last Mile"	Larry Boone, Will Robinson	3:15
11.	"Holdin' Onto Something"	Tom Shapiro, Thom McHugh	2:51

== Personnel ==
- Jeff Carson – lead vocals, backing vocals, harmonica
- Tony Harrell – acoustic piano, keyboards
- J. T. Corenflos – electric guitars
- Brent Mason – electric guitars
- Bob Regan – acoustic guitars
- Brent Rowan – electric guitars
- Michael Spriggs – acoustic guitars
- John Willis – electric guitars
- Paul Franklin – steel guitar
- Glenn Worf – bass
- Chad Cromwell – drums
- Lonnie Wilson – drums
- Terry McMillan – harmonica
- Larry Franklin – fiddle
- Rob Hajacos – fiddle
- Jonathan Yudkin – fiddle
- John Catchings – cello
- Conni Ellisor – violin
- Michael Black – backing vocals
- John Wesley Ryles – backing vocals
- Cindy Richardson Walker – backing vocals
- Hurshel Wiginton – backing vocals
- Dennis Wilson – backing vocals
- Curtis Young – backing vocals

=== Production ===
- Chuck Howard – producer
- Gary Heyde – associate producer
- Bob Campbell-Smith – associate producer, recording, overdub recording, mixing
- Mark Ralston – recording assistant, mix assistant
- Jeff Watkins – recording assistant, overdub assistant
- Craig White – recording assistant, mix assistant
- Benny Quinn – mastering at Masterfonics (Nashville, Tennessee)
- Sandra Rankin – production coordinator
- Neuman, Walker & Associates – art direction, design
- Sue Austin – album design coordinator
- Jim "Señor" McGuire – photography

== Chart performance ==
Chart (1995)	Peak position
U.S. Billboard Top Country Albums	22
U.S. Billboard 200	152
U.S. Billboard Top Heatseekers	7
Canadian RPM Country Albums	4

=== Singles ===
Year	Single	Peak chart positions		
Year	Single	US Country	US	CAN Country
1995	"Yeah Buddy"	69	—	—
1995	"Not on Your Love"	1	97	2
1995	"The Car"	3	113	3
1996	"Holdin' Onto Somethin'"	6	—	20
1996	"That Last Mile'"	62	—	—
"—" denotes releases that did not chart
