= Real Life =

Real Life or Real Live(s) may refer to:

- Real life, the state of existence outside online or artificial interactions

== Film and television ==
- Real Life (1979 film), an American comedy film by Albert Brooks
- Real Life (2004 film), a Greek drama film by Panos H. Koutras
- Real Life (TV program), an Australian tabloid TV program 1992–1994
- Real Life with Jane Pauley, an American news-magazine TV program 1990–1991
- "Real Life" (Electric Dreams), a television episode
- "Real Life" (Star Trek: Voyager), a television episode
- Real Life (TV channel), an Australian subscription television channel only on Foxtel
- Real Lives (TV channel), a British channel

== Literature ==
- Real Life (novel) a 2020 novel by Brandon Taylor
- Real Life, a 1986 novel by Kitty Burns Florey
- Real Life, a 1992 novel by D. J. Taylor
- Real Life (webcomic), a webcomic by Maelyn Dean
- REALLIFE Magazine, a New York City–based arts magazine

== Music ==
- Real Life (band), an Australian band
- Real Live Tour, a 1993 concert tour by Iron Maiden
- Real Live, an American rap duo consisting of K-Def and Larry-O

=== Albums ===
- Real Life (Cindy Morgan album) or the title song, 1992
- Real Life (Crown of Creation album), 1994
- Real Life (Emeli Sandé album) or the title song, 2019
- Real Life (Evermore album) or the title song, 2006
- Real Life (Jeff Carson album) or the title song (see below), 2001
- Real Life (Joan as Police Woman album) or the title song, 2006
- Real Life (Lincoln Brewster album) or the title song, 2010
- Real Life (Magazine album), 1978
- Real Life (Marie Wilson album), 1998
- Real Life (Real Lies album), 2015
- Real Life (Simple Minds album) or the title song, 1991
- Real Life, by Jaki Graham, 1994
- Real Life, by R. J. Helton, 2004
- The Real Life (album), by Bread of Stone, or the title song, 2013
- Real Live, by Bob Dylan, 1984
- Real Live!, by Frank Marino and Mahogany Rush, 2004

=== Songs ===
- "Real Life" (Bon Jovi song), 1999
- "Real Life" (Jake Owen song), 2015
- "Real Life (I Never Was the Same Again)", by Jeff Carson, 2001
- "Real Life", by Bastille from Give Me the Future + Dreams of the Past, 2022
- "Real Life", by Burna Boy from Twice as Tall, 2020
- "Real Life", by Christopher, 2019
- "Real Life", by Duke Dumont and Gorgon City, 2017
- "Real Life", by Girls Aloud from What Will the Neighbours Say?, 2004
- "Real Life", by Imagine Dragons from Origins, 2018
- "Real Life", by Interpol from A Fine Mess, 2019
- "Real Life", by Ty Dolla Sign from Featuring Ty Dolla Sign, 2020
- "Real Life", by Vitamin C from More, 2001
- "Real Life", by the Weeknd from Beauty Behind the Madness, 2015
- "The Real Life", by Dave Lee recording as Raven Maize, 2001
- "The Real Life", by Dave Lee recording as Brad Hed, 2009

== Other uses ==
- Real Life Amphitheater, Selma, Texas, US
- Real Life Ministries, a church in Post Falls, Idaho, US
- Real Lives (video game), a 2001 educational video game

== See also ==
- In Real Life (disambiguation)
- Real Life Adventures, a single-panel nationally syndicated daily comic
- Reality, the state of things as they actually exist
- Reel Life (disambiguation)
