= Reality (disambiguation) =

Reality refers to the state of things as they exist, as opposed to how they could possibly exist.

Reality may also refer to:

== Films and television ==
- Vaastav: The Reality, a 1999 Indian film directed by Mahesh Manjrekar
- Reality (2012 film), an Italian film directed by Matteo Garrone
- Reality (2014 film), a French-Belgian film directed by Quentin Dupieux
- Reality (2023 film), an American film about Reality Winner directed by Tina Satter
- "Reality" (The Armando Iannucci Shows), a television episode
- TVI Reality, a Portuguese television channel

== Music ==
- Reality (David Bowie album), 2003, or the title song
- Reality (Dream album), 2003
- Reality (Monk Montgomery album), 1974
- Reality (Smooth album), 1998
- Reality (James Brown album), 1974
  - "Reality" (James Brown song), 1975
- Reality (Second Hand album), 1968
- Reality (Infinite EP), 2015
- Reality (Real Estate EP), 2009
- Reality (Tackhead song), 1988
- "Reality" (Kenny Chesney song), 2011
- "Reality" (Richard Sanderson song), 1980
- "Reality" (Lost Frequencies song), 2015
- "Reality" (Dream song), 2000
- "Reality", a song by The Newsboys from the album Take Me To Your Leader
- "Reality", a song by R. Kelly from the album R.
- "Reality", a song by Sault from the album Air, 2022
- "Reality", a song by Staind from the album 14 Shades of Grey
- "R.E.A.L.I.T.Y.", a song by KRS-One from the 1995 album KRS-One

== Others ==
- Real life, the state of existence outside of online or artificial interactions
- Realities (novel), an 1851 novel by Eliza Lynn Linton
- Reality (database) by Microdata Corporation, now Northgate Information Solutions
- Reality Kings (company name: MG Premium Ltd.), an independent American brand launched by RTA Netmedia, an internet-based hardcore pornography production company
- Reality Winner, American whistleblower
- Reality (Jacek Malczewski), a 1908 oil-on-canvas painting by Jacek Malczewski
- Reality (software synthesizer), a software synthesizer for the PC released in 1997 by Seer Systems
- Reality structure in mathematics, a property related to real numbers
- Being a real number in mathematics, a property sometimes called "reality", as in the "reality of the eigenvalues"

== See also ==
- Real (disambiguation)
- Realiti (disambiguation)
- Real World (disambiguation)
- Reality television
- Ytilaer, 2022 album by Bill Callahan
