= List of Top Country Albums number ones of 1994 =

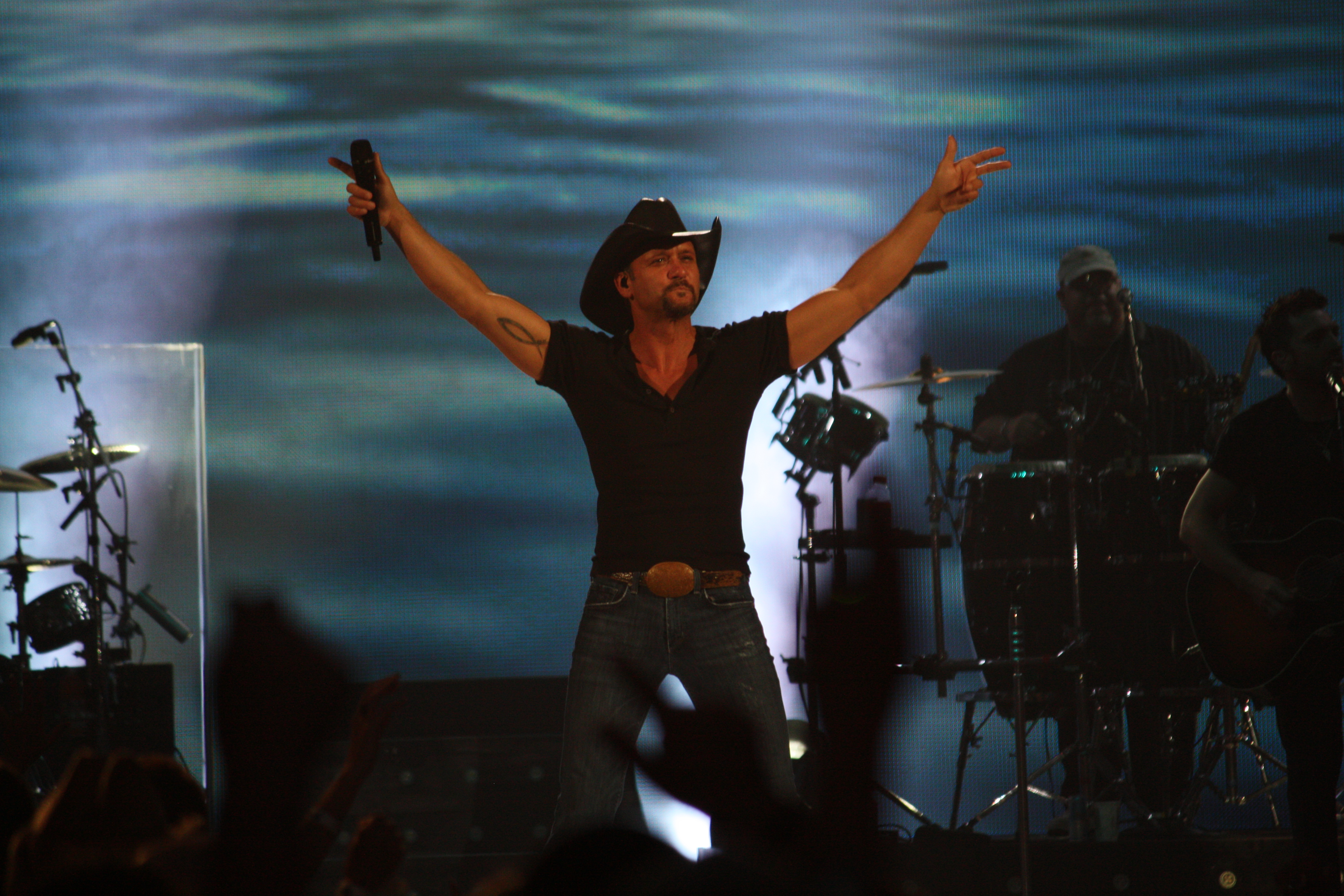
Not a Moment Too Soon was the first number one for Tim McGraw. It spent 29 weeks in the top spot.

Top Country Albums is a chart that ranks the top-performing country music albums in the United States, published by Billboard. In 1994, 10 different albums topped the chart, based on electronic point of sale data provided by SoundScan Inc.

In the issue of Billboard dated January 1, the number one position was held by the compilation album Common Thread: The Songs of the Eagles, its ninth week in the top spot. The album, which featured various country music artists performing songs originally recorded by the Eagles, spent five non-consecutive weeks at number one in 1994, interrupted for a single week by Reba McEntire's album Greatest Hits Volume Two. A second compilation album topped the chart in March and April, when Rhythm, Country and Blues, consisting of duets between R&B and country artists, spent two weeks in the top spot. Several artists performed on both albums, including Travis Tritt, Vince Gill, and Trisha Yearwood, none of whom had topped the chart with any of their own albums to date.

In February, John Michael Montgomery achieved his first number one with Kickin' It Up, which spent six weeks in the top spot. The album also topped the all-genre Billboard 200 listing. Two months later, Tim McGraw achieved a similar feat by topping the country albums chart for the first time with an album which also reached number one on the Billboard 200. McGraw's album Not a Moment Too Soon spent an initial 15 weeks at number one on the country chart, was displaced for a single week, then returned to the top spot for a further 11 weeks. It returned to the top of the chart in December for a further three weeks to give a final total of 29 weeks atop the chart; only five previous albums had spent longer atop the chart. The best-selling country album of the year, Not a Moment Too Soon launched McGraw to stardom; in the second half of the 1990s he was the most successful artist in country music and achieved mainstream celebrity. Two other acts reached number one for the first time in the latter half of the year. In the issue of Billboard dated October 15, Brooks & Dunn topped the chart for the first time with Waitin' on Sundown, and the following week Mary Chapin Carpenter gained the only number one of her career with Stones in the Road. The year's final chart-topper was The Hits by Garth Brooks.

== Chart history ==
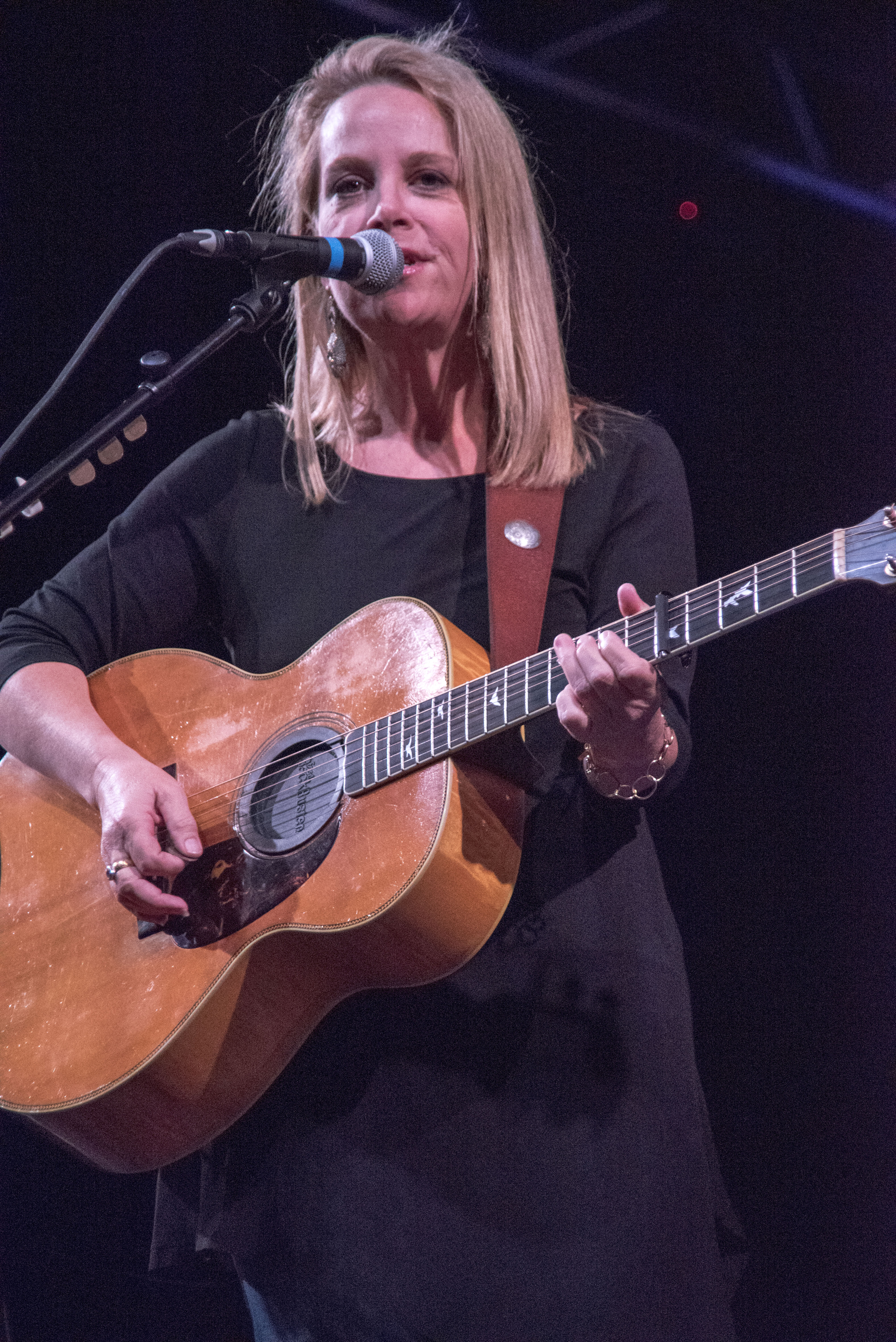
Stones in the Road was the first number one for Mary Chapin Carpenter.

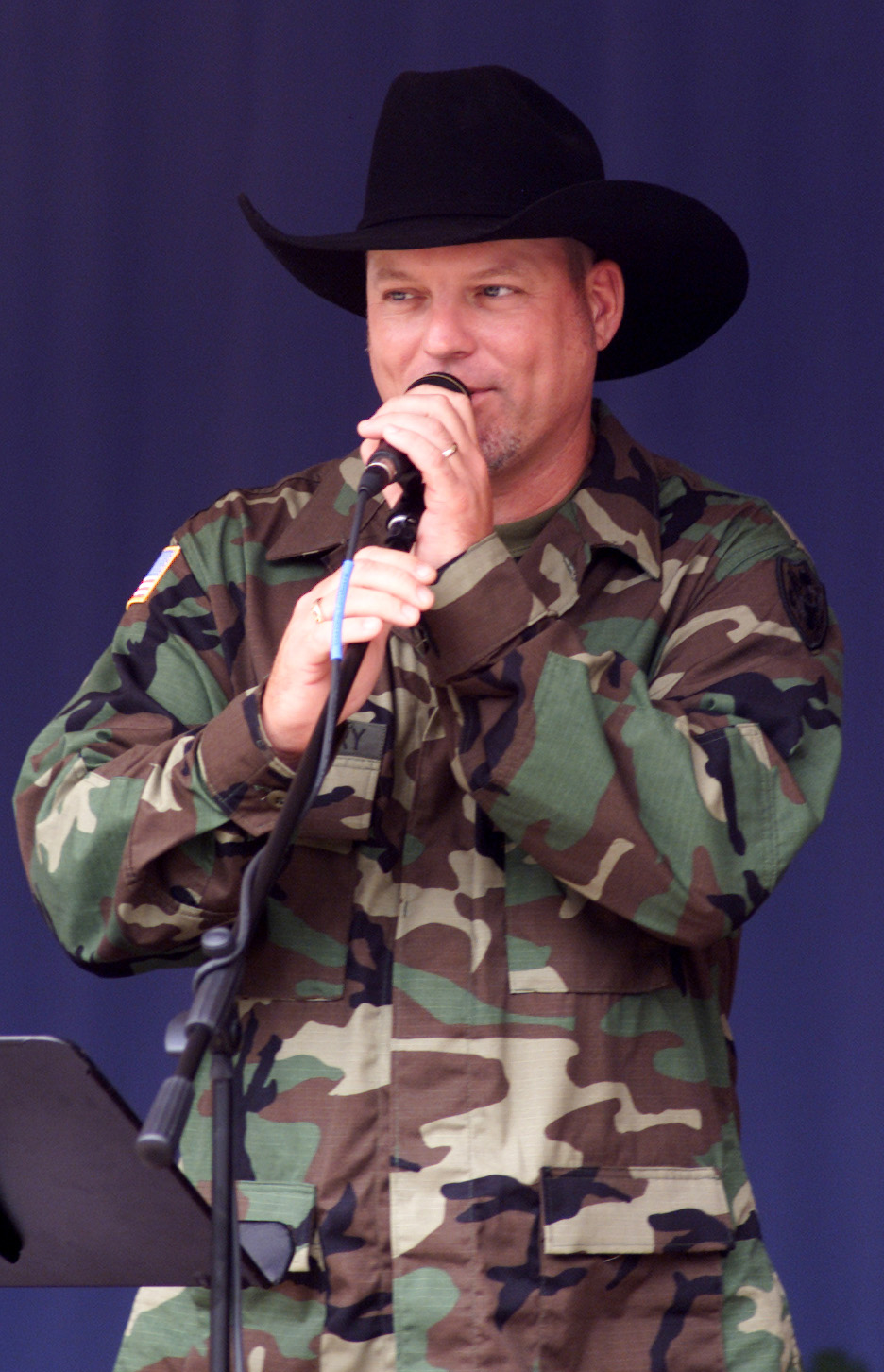
John Michael Montgomery's Kickin' It Up spent six weeks at number one and also topped the all-genre Billboard 200.

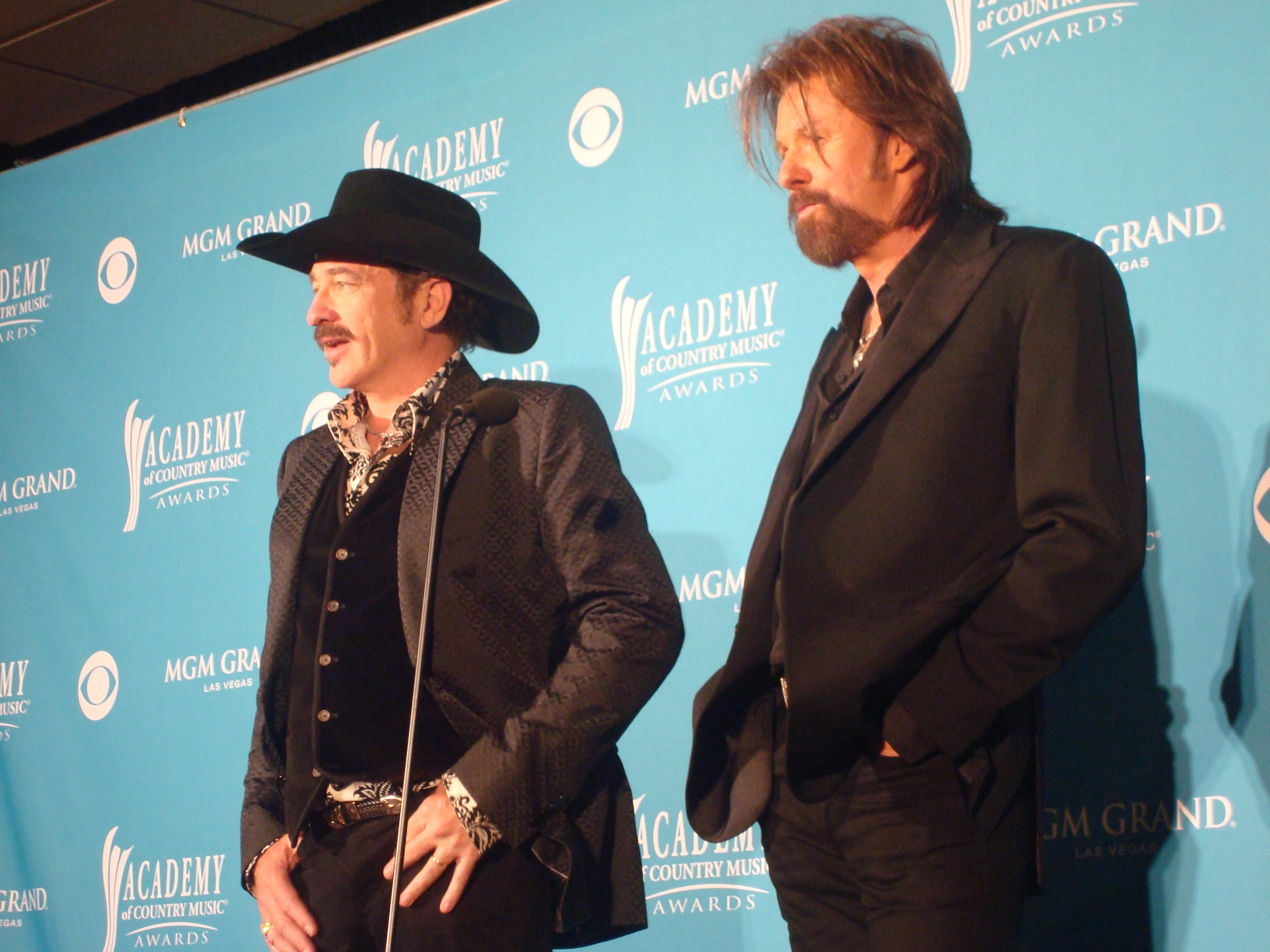
Brooks & Dunn reached number one for the first time with Waitin' on Sundown.

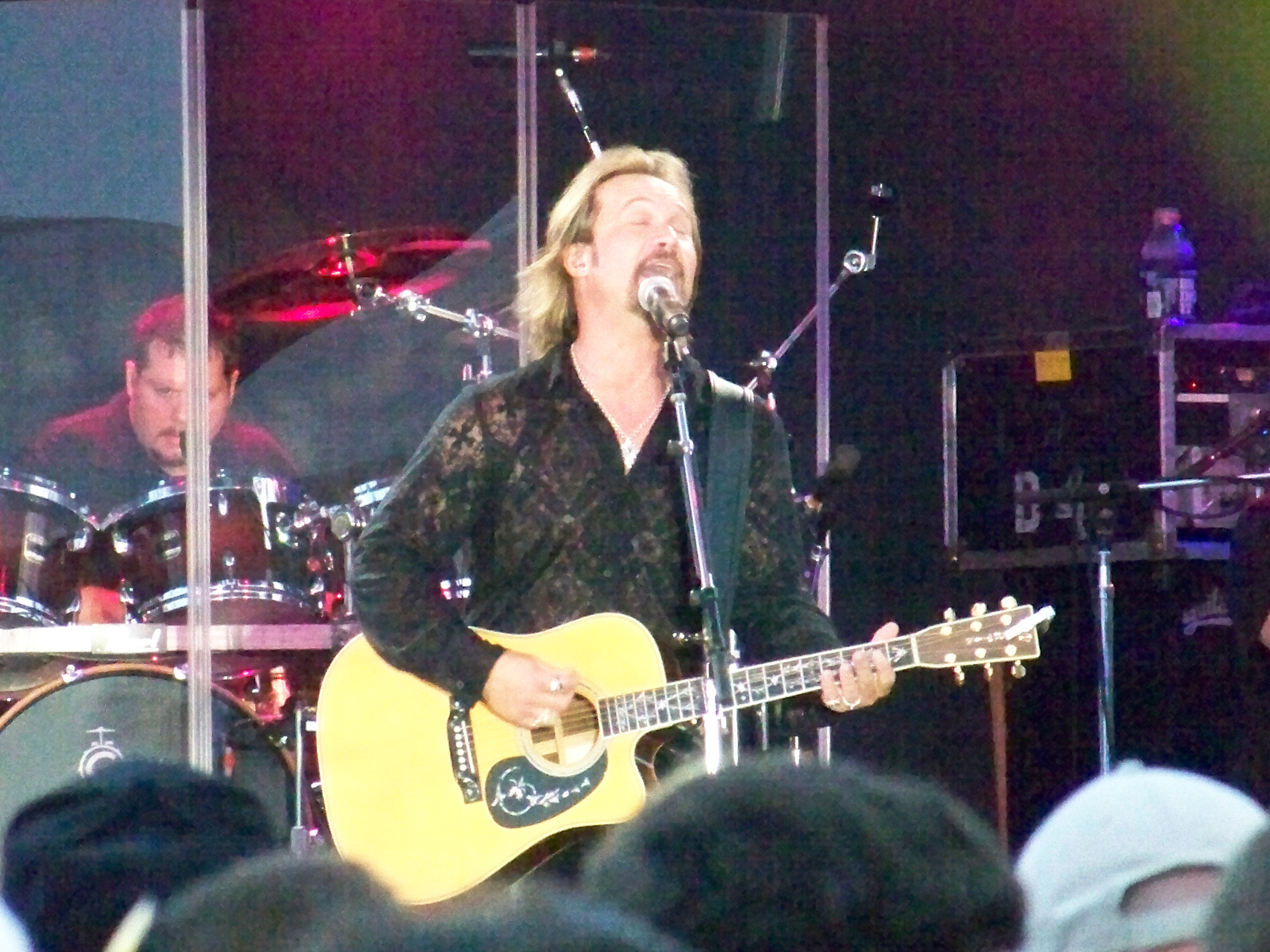
Travis Tritt performed on both compilation albums to reach number one in 1994.

Issue date	Title	Artist(s)	Ref.
January 1	Common Thread: The Songs of the Eagles	Various Artists	
January 8	Common Thread: The Songs of the Eagles	Various Artists	
January 15	Common Thread: The Songs of the Eagles	Various Artists	
January 22	Greatest Hits Volume Two	Reba McEntire	
January 29	Common Thread: The Songs of the Eagles	Various Artists	
February 5	Common Thread: The Songs of the Eagles	Various Artists	
February 12	Kickin' It Up	John Michael Montgomery	
February 19	Kickin' It Up	John Michael Montgomery	
February 26	Kickin' It Up	John Michael Montgomery	
March 5	Kickin' It Up	John Michael Montgomery	
March 12	Kickin' It Up	John Michael Montgomery	
March 19	Kickin' It Up	John Michael Montgomery	
March 26	Rhythm, Country and Blues	Various Artists	
April 2	Rhythm, Country and Blues	Various Artists	
April 9	Not a Moment Too Soon	Tim McGraw	
April 16	Not a Moment Too Soon	Tim McGraw	
April 23	Not a Moment Too Soon	Tim McGraw	
April 30	Not a Moment Too Soon	Tim McGraw	
May 7	Not a Moment Too Soon	Tim McGraw	
May 14	Not a Moment Too Soon	Tim McGraw	
May 21	Not a Moment Too Soon	Tim McGraw	
May 28	Not a Moment Too Soon	Tim McGraw	
June 4	Not a Moment Too Soon	Tim McGraw	
June 11	Not a Moment Too Soon	Tim McGraw	
June 18	Not a Moment Too Soon	Tim McGraw	
June 25	Not a Moment Too Soon	Tim McGraw	
July 2	Not a Moment Too Soon	Tim McGraw	
July 9	Not a Moment Too Soon	Tim McGraw	
July 16	Not a Moment Too Soon	Tim McGraw	
July 23	Who I Am	Alan Jackson	
July 30	Not a Moment Too Soon	Tim McGraw	
August 6	Not a Moment Too Soon	Tim McGraw	
August 13	Not a Moment Too Soon	Tim McGraw	
August 20	Not a Moment Too Soon	Tim McGraw	
August 27	Not a Moment Too Soon	Tim McGraw	
September 3	Not a Moment Too Soon	Tim McGraw	
September 10	Not a Moment Too Soon	Tim McGraw	
September 17	Not a Moment Too Soon	Tim McGraw	
September 24	Not a Moment Too Soon	Tim McGraw	
October 1	Not a Moment Too Soon	Tim McGraw	
October 8	Not a Moment Too Soon	Tim McGraw	
October 15	Waitin' on Sundown	Brooks & Dunn	
October 22	Stones in the Road	Mary Chapin Carpenter	
October 29	Stones in the Road	Mary Chapin Carpenter	
November 5	Stones in the Road	Mary Chapin Carpenter	
November 12	Stones in the Road	Mary Chapin Carpenter	
November 19	Stones in the Road	Mary Chapin Carpenter	
November 26	Lead On	George Strait	
December 3	Lead On	George Strait	
December 10	Not a Moment Too Soon	Tim McGraw	
December 17	Not a Moment Too Soon	Tim McGraw	
December 24	Not a Moment Too Soon	Tim McGraw	
December 31	The Hits	Garth Brooks	
