= Real World =

Real World or The Real World may refer to:

- Real life, a phrase to distinguish between the real world and fictional, virtual or idealized worlds
- Reality
- World
- Existence

== Television ==
- The Real World (TV series), 1992–2017
- "The Real World" (Stargate Atlantis), a 2006 episode

== Music ==
- Real World (album), by Kokia, 2010
- Da Real World, an album by Missy Elliott, 1999
- "Real World" (Matchbox Twenty song), 1998
- "Real World" (Queensrÿche song), 1993
- "Real World", a song by The All-American Rejects from the 2008 album When the World Comes Down
- "Real World", a song by Anaïs Mitchell from the 2022 album Anaïs Mitchell
- "The Real World", a song by the Bangles from the 1982 EP Bangles
- "Real World", a song by Bruce Springsteen from the 1992 album Human Touch
- "Real World", a 2004 song by D-Side
- "Real World", a song by Skylar Grey from the 2016 album Natural Causes
- "Real World", a song by Pere Ubu from the 1978 album The Modern Dance
- "The Real World", a song by the Mighty Lemon Drops from the 1989 album Laughter
- "The Real World", a song by Owl City from the 2011 album All Things Bright and Beautiful
- Real World Records, a record label
  - Real World Studios, the label's recording studio

== Other uses ==
- The Real World?, a 1987 play by Michel Tremblay
- Real World (novel), a 2003 novel by Natsuo Kirino
- The Real World, an online platform launched by Andrew Tate

== See also ==
- Real Life (disambiguation)
- In Real Life (disambiguation)
- The Challenge (TV series), later Real World/Road Rules Challenge
