= John Michael Montgomery (album) =

Studio album by John Michael Montgomery
- Released: March 28, 1995
- Recorded: 1994
- Studio: The Castle (Franklin, Tennessee); Recording Arts, OmniSound Studios, Soundshop Recording Studios and Sound Emporium Studios (Nashville, Tennessee)
- Genre: Country
- Length: 33:01
- Label: Atlantic
- Producer: Scott Hendricks

John Michael Montgomery chronology
Kickin' It Up (1994)	John Michael Montgomery (1995)	What I Do the Best (1996)

Singles from John Michael Montgomery
- 1. "I Can Love You Like That" Released: February 27, 1995; 2. "Sold (The Grundy County Auction Incident)" Released: May 13, 1995; 3. "No Man's Land" Released: August 21, 1995; 4. "Cowboy Love" Released: November 13, 1995; 5. "Long as I Live" Released: February 26, 1996

Professional ratings
Review scores
Source	Rating
Allmusic	link
Entertainment Weekly	C link
The Village Voice	C+

John Michael Montgomery is the third studio album by American country music artist John Michael Montgomery. Singles released from this album include "I Can Love You Like That", "Sold (The Grundy County Auction Incident)", "No Man's Land", "Cowboy Love" and "Long as I Live". Respectively, these reached #1, #1, #3, #4, and #4 on the Hot Country Songs charts; "Sold" was also declared the Number One country song of 1995 by Billboard.

The track "Holdin' Onto Something" was also recorded by Jeff Carson on his 1995 self-titled debut album, from which it was released as a single in 1996.

== Track listing ==
No.	Title	Writer(s)	Length
1.	"Cowboy Love"	Bill Douglas, Jeff Wood	3:12
2.	"Sold (The Grundy County Auction Incident)"	Richard Fagan, Robb Royer	2:30
3.	"I Can Love You Like That"	Steve Diamond, Maribeth Derry, Jennifer Kimball	3:53
4.	"High School Heart"	Jerry Laseter, Kerry Kurt Phillips	3:14
5.	"Just Like a Rodeo"	Roger Brown, Tommy Conners	3:09
6.	"Holdin' Onto Something"	Tom Shapiro, Thom McHugh	2:58
7.	"Long as I Live"	Rick Bowles, Will Robinson	4:16
8.	"No Man's Land"	John Scott Sherrill, Steve Seskin	3:02
9.	"Heaven Sent Me You"	John E. McCollum, Len Doolin	3:36
10.	"It's What I Am"	John Calvert, Aaron Sain	2:59

== Personnel ==
Per liner notes.

- John Michael Montgomery – vocals
- John Barlow Jarvis – acoustic piano
- Bill Cuomo – synthesizers (3, 4, 7–9)
- Dann Huff – electric guitars (1, 3, 4, 6–10)
- Brent Mason – electric guitars
- Billy Joe Walker, Jr. – acoustic guitars, electric guitars (6)
- Paul Franklin – steel guitar
- Glenn Worf – bass
- Lonnie Wilson – drums
- Terry McMillan – harmonica (2), cymbals (3, 7), tambourine (6)
- Rob Hajacos – fiddle (1, 2, 4, 5, 7, 9, 10)
- Buddy Skipper – horn arrangements (5)
- Denis Solee – tenor saxophone (5)
- Barry Green – trombone (5)
- George Tidwell – trumpet (5)
- John Wesley Ryles – backing vocals (1, 2, 5, 6, 9, 10)
- Dennis Wilson – backing vocals (2–9)
- Harry Stinson – backing vocals (3, 4, 7, 8)

=== Production ===
- Scott Hendricks – producer, overdub recording
- John Kelton – recording
- John Jaszcz – mixing
- John Kunz – recording assistant, overdub assistant, mix assistant, production assistant
- Ken Hutton – recording assistant
- Thomas Johnson – mix assistant
- Mike Purcell – mix assistant
- Hank Williams – mastering at MasterMix (Nashville, Tennessee)
- P. David Eleazar – art direction
- Lee Ann Ramey – design
- Mark Tucker – photography
- The Hallmark Direction Company – management

== Chart performance ==
Chart (1995)	Peak position
U.S. Billboard Top Country Albums	1
U.S. Billboard 200	5
Canadian RPM Country Albums	1
Canadian RPM Top Albums	33

== Certifications ==
Region	Certification	Certified units/sales
Canada (Music Canada)	Platinum	100,000^{^}
United States (RIAA)	4× Platinum	4,000,000^{^}
^{^} Shipments figures based on certification alone.
