= Long as I Live =

Long as I Live may refer to:

- Long as I Live (John Michael Montgomery song), 1996
- Long as I Live (Toni Braxton song), 2018
