= Idéal J =

French rap group (1990s–2001)

Idéal J (originally known as Idéal Junior) was a French rap group from Val-de-Marne, active primarily during the 1990s until their disbandment in 2001.

They released two studio albums: O'riginal MC's sur une mission (1996) and Le combat continue (1998), which included the track "Hardcore". Idéal J was also associated with the French hip-hop collective Mafia K-1 Fry.

== Members ==
The group was founded in 1990, originally by the name Idéal Junior and later changed to Idéal J. Their name was a tribute to the crew of "big brothers" called Idéal. The original members, aged around 13 to 14 at the time, included:

- Daddy Kery (Alix Mathurin, later known as Kery James)
- Alter MC (later known as Jessy Money)
- Bakar (later known as Rocco)
- Teddy Corona
- Selim du 9.4 (Sélim Bélabès)

In 1992, DJ Mehdi joined the group. Due to the departure of Alter MC and Selim du 9.4 in 1993, by the time of their debut studio album in 1996, the group consisted of Kery James, Teddy Corona, Rocco, and DJ Mehdi.

One year after their second album the group was severely impacted by the death of french rapper Las Montana - born Lassana Touré - in 1999, who's murder's circumstances remain unclear and are subject to speculations till this day. This led Kery James - who knew Las Montana from the group Mafia K-1 Fry - to publicly announce the end of his career with Idéal J. He converted to Islam and started his solo-career soon after in 2000.

== Career ==
In 1992, the group released the maxi single "La vie est brutale" and began performing at local festivals. DJ Mehdi joined the group in 1992, contributing to their production and live performances. From that moment onwards he composed all instrumentals for the group. A dispute between the members of Idéal Junior and their producer led to delays in releasing a full album. Despite this, the group continued to tour, perform, and record tracks for Alariana, a label established by associates.

After resolving their contractual issues, they contributed to the soundtrack of the 1995 film Raï with the tracks "Mauvais Garçon" and "Ce soir". That same year, they provided the title track for the mixtape Orly City Bronx.

The group renamed itself Idéal J and released its debut album O'riginal MC's sur une mission. The album featured socially conscious tracks like "Le ghetto français," "Show bizness," "Je dois faire du cash," and variations of "Ghettolude." Idéal J began to regularly contribute to various maxi single releases. The single "J'désole mes parents", featured on the compilation Nouvelle donne, garnered them broader recognition.

Their second album, Le combat continue, was released in 1998. It featured collaborations with artists affiliated with the collective Mafia K-1 Fry, including Rohff, Demon One, AP, Karlito, Dry, and OGB, alongside Hasheem, Zahariya, Leila, and Different Teep. Kery James focused on writing new material, with lyrics reportedly reflecting experiences such as police interactions, neighborhood rivalries, and anxieties about mortality.

The group's lyrics generated controversy. Their single "Hardcore" was reportedly banned from mainstream radio play, and its music video was initially withdrawn, edited, and later re-released. "Hardcore" contained lyrics that addressed topics including the French police force, Black police officers ("Les flics noirs ne sont que des traîtres et j'en bave de rage"), homosexuals ("Deux pédés qui s'embrassent en plein Paris, Hardcore") – interpreted as homophobic in the context of the song – as well as news items such as deforestation, the war in Yugoslavia, the right-wing party Front National, the Ku Klux Klan, the French Revolution, colonization, and World War II. Another release that drew controversy was "Pour une poignée de dollars".

After the death of Las Montana Idéal J gave a final concert at Élysée Montmartre in 1999, after which the group ceased performing together. Its dissolution became apparent at the latest with the release of Kery James' first solo album Si c'était à refaire… in 2001. In one of its songs, namely La mort qui va avec, he claims that "Idéal J died with DJ Mehdi".

== After split-up ==
Following the group's breakup, most members continued to pursue musical careers.

- Kery James became more involved with the Muslim community after Montana's death. His first solo album, Si c'était à refaire..., released in 2001, is often considered to mark a definitive turn towards his solo career after Idéal J. The album was certified gold. In 2005, he released Ma vérité, which included a section from "Hardcore". He later released À l'ombre du show business (certified platinum in 2008) and Réel (certified double platinum in 2009).
  In 2008, he created the association ACES (Apprendre, Comprendre, Entreprendre et Servir; literally "Learn, Understand, Undertake and Serve") which aims to help young people from low-income families graduate from secondary school. It offers scholarships of up to 6000€ per recipient.
- Mehdi Favéris-Essadi, known as DJ Mehdi, released his debut solo album (The Story of) Espion, containing electro and house influences shortly after the group's separation. This was followed in 2005 by a collaborative album with Kourtrajmé, Des friandises pour ta bouche. In 2006, he released his solo album Lucky Boy, followed by Lucky Boy at Night (2007), and Red Black & Blue (2009). He died September 13, 2011.
- Teddy Corona remained a member of Mafia K-1 Fry and initiated the musical project Street Lourd Hall Stars under the Small Records label. A compilation featuring tracks by DJ Mosko, Mista Flo, and Rocco was released in November 2004. A second compilation album, Street Lourd Hall Stars II, followed in July 2010.
- Bakar, now known as Rocco, is still a member of Mafia K-1 Fry and remains connected with the musicians from Orly, Vitry-sur-Seine, and Choisy-le-Roi. While he no longer raps, Rocco continues to contribute to the artistic productions of the collective's members.
- Selim du 9.4, whose real name is Sélim Bélabès, has also maintained his connection with Mafia K-1 Fry, appearing on two of their compilation albums. His brother, Rak, is also a rapper associated with the collective.

== Discography ==
=== Studio albums ===
Year	Album	Peak positions
Year	Album	FR
1996	O'riginal MC's sur une mission	–
1998	Le combat continue	21

=== Singles ===
Year	Single	Credited to	Peak positions	Album
Year	Single	Credited to	FR	Album
1992	"La vie est brutale"	Maxi-single credited to Idéal Junior	–	
1998	"Hardcore"	Single credited to Idéal J	67	Le combat continue
