= If You've Got Love =

Single by John Michael Montgomery

from the album Kickin' It Up
- B-side: "Kick It Up"
- Released: September 19, 1994
- Recorded: 1994
- Genre: Country
- Length: 3:54
- Label: Atlantic
- Songwriters: Mark D. Sanders, Steve Seskin
- Producer: Scott Hendricks

John Michael Montgomery singles chronology
"Be My Baby Tonight" (1994)	"If You've Got Love" (1994)	"I Can Love You Like That" (1995)

"If You've Got Love" is a song written by Mark D. Sanders and Steve Seskin, and recorded by American country music artist John Michael Montgomery. It was released in September 1994 as the fourth and final single from his album Kickin' It Up. It peaked at number 1 on the week of December 10, 1994, while it peaked at number 2 in Canada.

== Chart positions ==
Chart (1994)	Peak position
Canada Country Singles (RPM)	2
US Hot Country Songs (Billboard)	1

=== Year-end charts ===
Chart (1994)	Position
Canada Country Tracks (RPM)	79
