= Realiti =

Realiti may refer to:

- Realiti (TV series), a 2006 Malaysian series
- "Realiti" (song), a 2015 song by Grimes
- Realiti (film), a 2014 film directed by Jonathan King

== See also ==
- Reality (disambiguation)
