= Rope the Moon =

Single by John Michael Montgomery

from the album Kickin' It Up
- Released: March 14, 1994
- Recorded: 1994
- Genre: Country
- Length: 4:07
- Label: Atlantic
- Songwriters: Aggie Brown; Jess Brown; Jimmy Denton
- Producer: Scott Hendricks

John Michael Montgomery singles chronology
"I Swear" (1993)	"Rope the Moon" (1994)	"Be My Baby Tonight" (1994)

"Rope the Moon" is a song written by Jess Brown, Aggie Brown and Jimmy Denton, and recorded by American country music artist John Michael Montgomery. It was released in March 1994 as the second single from his album Kickin' It Up. It peaked at number 4 in the United States, and number 2 in Canada.

== Music video ==
The music video was directed by Marc Ball, and premiered in early 1994. The video depicts a different concept whereas, instead of being a love song to a significant other, it depicts a father-daughter relationship. This particular concept was an idea directly from Montgomery himself.

== Chart positions ==
"Rope the Moon" debuted at number 69 on the U.S. Billboard Hot Country Singles & Tracks for the week of March 14, 1994.

Chart (1994)	Peak position
Canada Country Singles (RPM)	2
US Hot Country Songs (Billboard)	4

=== Year-end charts ===
Chart (1994)	Position
Canada Country Tracks (RPM)	26
US Country Songs (Billboard)	45
