= Be My Baby Tonight =

Single by John Michael Montgomery

from the album Kickin' It Up
- Released: May 23, 1994
- Genre: Country
- Length: 2:52
- Label: Atlantic
- Songwriters: Richard Fagan; Ed Hill
- Producer: Scott Hendricks

John Michael Montgomery singles chronology
| "Rope the Moon" (1994) | "Be My Baby Tonight" (1994) | "If You've Got Love" (1994) |

"Be My Baby Tonight" is a song written by Richard Fagan and Ed Hill, and recorded by American country music artist John Michael Montgomery. It was released in May 1994 as the third single from Montgomery's album Kickin' It Up. It reached number one on the United States and Canada country charts in August 1994.

== Critical reception ==
Deborah Evans Price, of Billboard magazine reviewed the song, saying that while Montgomery, "handles this one with ease", she considers it just "a notch above ordinary."

== Music video ==
The music video was directed by Marc Ball, and premiered in mid-1994. The video takes place at Davis–Monthan Air Force Base.

== Chart performance ==
"Be My Baby Tonight" debuted at number 71 on the U.S. Billboard Hot Country Singles & Tracks for the week of May 7, 1994.

| Chart (1994) | Peak position |
|---|---|
| Canada Country Singles (RPM) | 1 |
| US Billboard Hot 100 | 73 |
| US Hot Country Songs (Billboard) | 1 |

=== Year-end charts ===
| Chart (1994) | Position |
|---|---|
| Canada Country Tracks (RPM) | 16 |
| US Country Songs (Billboard) | 28 |
