= List of Billboard 200 number-one albums of 1994 =

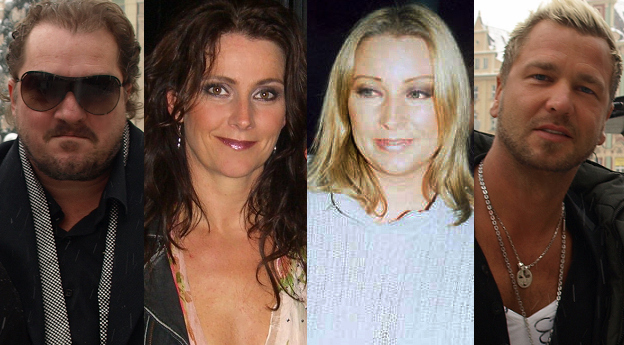
The Sign by Ace of Base was the best-selling album of 1994.

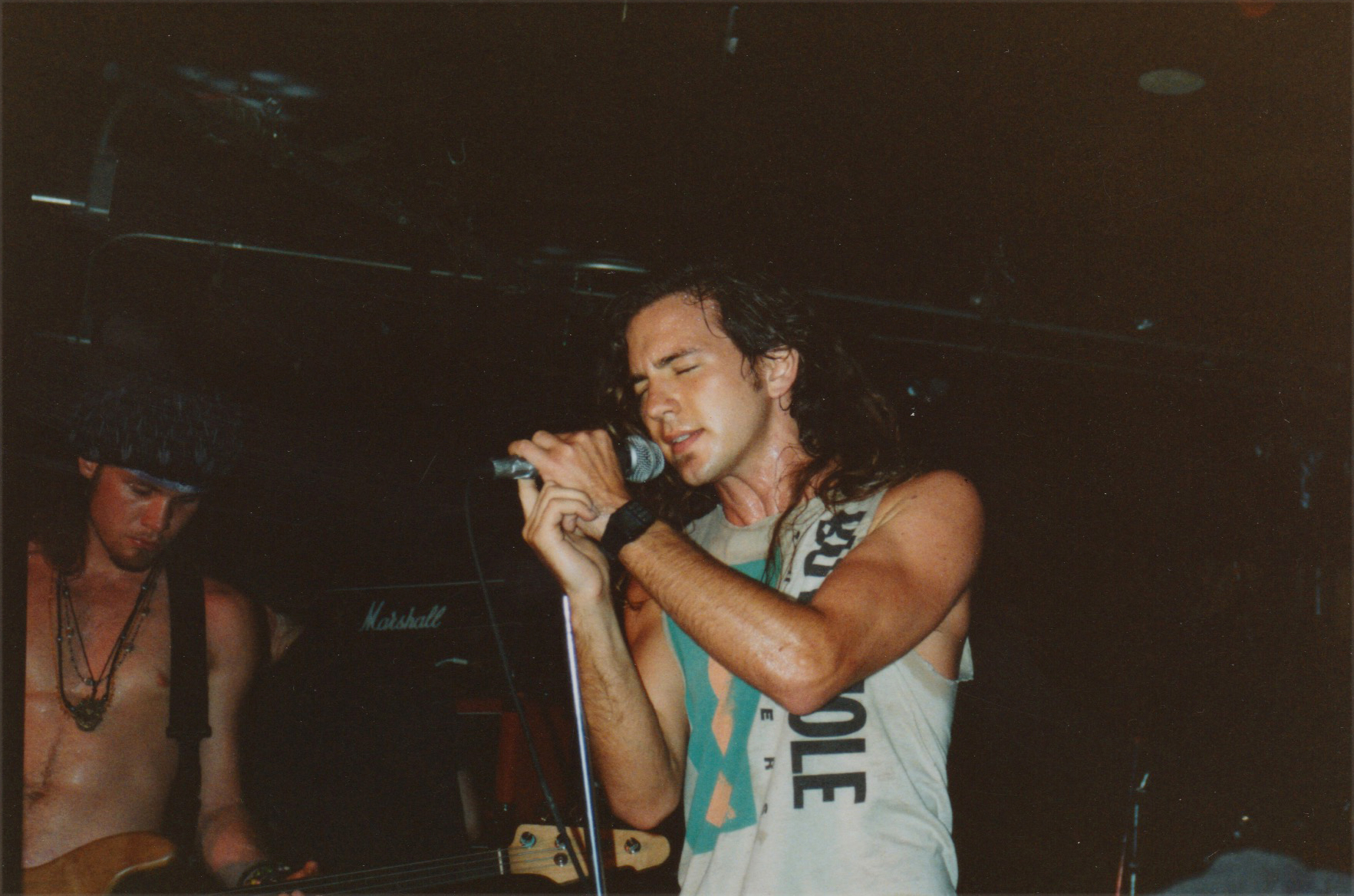
Vitalogy by Pearl Jam had the biggest sales week of 1994.

These are the Billboard magazine number-one albums of 1994, per the Billboard 200.

== Chart history ==
Key
†	Indicates best performing album of 1994

Issue date	Album	Artist(s)	Label	Sales	Ref.
January 1	Music Box	Mariah Carey	Columbia	393,000	
January 8	Music Box	Mariah Carey	Columbia	505,000	
January 15	Doggystyle	Snoop Doggy Dogg	Death Row	270,000	
January 22	Music Box	Mariah Carey	Columbia	163,000	
January 29	Music Box	Mariah Carey	Columbia	125,000	
February 5	Music Box	Mariah Carey	Columbia	108,000	
February 12	Jar of Flies	Alice In Chains	Columbia	141,000	
February 19	Kickin' It Up	John Michael Montgomery	Atlantic	108,000	
February 26	Toni Braxton	Toni Braxton	LaFace	104,000	
March 5	Music Box	Mariah Carey	Columbia	117,000	
March 12	Music Box	Mariah Carey	Columbia	92,000	
March 19	Toni Braxton	Toni Braxton	LaFace	104,000	
March 26	Superunknown	Soundgarden	A&M	162,000	
April 2	The Sign †	Ace of Base	Arista	106,000	
April 9	Far Beyond Driven	Pantera	EastWest	185,000	
April 16	Longing in Their Hearts	Bonnie Raitt	Capitol	146,000	
April 23	The Division Bell	Pink Floyd	Columbia	465,000	
April 30	The Division Bell	Pink Floyd	Columbia	226,000	
May 7	The Division Bell	Pink Floyd	Columbia	157,000	
May 14	The Division Bell	Pink Floyd	Columbia	134,000	
May 21	Not a Moment Too Soon	Tim McGraw	Curb	132,442	
May 28	Not a Moment Too Soon	Tim McGraw	Curb	133,780	
June 4	The Crow: Original Motion Picture Soundtrack	Soundtrack	Atlantic	125,000	
June 11	The Sign †	Ace of Base	Arista	126,000	
June 18	Ill Communication	Beastie Boys	Grand Royal	220,000	
June 25	Purple	Stone Temple Pilots	Atlantic	252,000	
July 2	Purple	Stone Temple Pilots	Atlantic	196,000	
July 9	Purple	Stone Temple Pilots	Atlantic	177,000	
July 16	The Lion King	Elton John / Soundtrack	Walt Disney	271,000	
July 23	The Lion King	Elton John / Soundtrack	Walt Disney	296,000	
July 30	The Lion King	Elton John / Soundtrack	Walt Disney	311,000	
August 6	The Lion King	Elton John / Soundtrack	Walt Disney	294,000	
August 13	The Lion King	Elton John / Soundtrack	Walt Disney	289,000	
August 20	The Lion King	Elton John / Soundtrack	Walt Disney	251,000	
August 27	The Lion King	Elton John / Soundtrack	Walt Disney	216,000	
September 3	The Lion King	Elton John / Soundtrack	Walt Disney	213,000	
September 10	The Lion King	Elton John / Soundtrack	Walt Disney	199,000	
September 17	II	Boyz II Men	Motown	302,000	
September 24	II	Boyz II Men	Motown	236,834	
October 1	From the Cradle	Eric Clapton	Duck	209,000	
October 8	II	Boyz II Men	Motown	175,000	
October 15	Monster	R.E.M.	Warner Bros.	343,500	
October 22	Monster	R.E.M.	Warner Bros.	178,000	
October 29	II	Boyz II Men	Motown	147,000	
November 5	Murder Was the Case	Soundtrack	Death Row	329,000	
November 12	Murder Was the Case	Soundtrack	Death Row	197,000	
November 19	MTV Unplugged in New York	Nirvana	DGC	310,000	
November 26	Hell Freezes Over	Eagles	Geffen	266,500	
December 3	Hell Freezes Over	Eagles	Geffen	203,000	
December 10	Miracles: The Holiday Album	Kenny G	Arista	241,000	
December 17	Miracles: The Holiday Album	Kenny G	Arista	328,000	
December 24	Vitalogy	Pearl Jam	Epic	877,000	
December 31	Miracles: The Holiday Album	Kenny G	Arista	718,000	

== See also ==
- 1994 in music
- Lists of Billboard 200 number-one albums
