= Butterfly Kisses (Jeff Carson album) =

Studio album by Jeff Carson
- Released: June 24, 1997
- Studio: Curb Studios, Starstruck Studios, Sound Stage Studios, Midtown Tone & Volume, Masterfonics, K.D. Studios and Wedgewood Sound (Nashville, Tennessee); Sound Kitchen (Franklin, Tennessee)
- Genre: Country
- Length: 42:58
- Label: Curb
- Producer: Chuck Howard; Merle Haggard (Co-producer on Track 11)

Jeff Carson chronology
Jeff Carson (1995)	Butterfly Kisses (1997)	Real Life (2001)

Professional ratings
Review scores
Source	Rating
Country Standard Time	(not rated) link

Butterfly Kisses is the second album released by American country music artist Jeff Carson. Released in 1997 on Curb Records, it features the singles "Butterfly Kisses" (a cover of Bob Carlisle's hit song from that same year) and "Here's the Deal". "Today I Started Loving You Again" is a cover of a Merle Haggard hit single, and features Haggard as a duet partner.

== Track listing ==
1. "Butterfly Kisses" (Bob Carlisle, Randy Thomas) - 3:55
2. "Here's the Deal" (Jody Harris, Bobby Taylor) - 3:52
3. "She's the One" (Max T. Barnes) - 3:09
4. "Do It Again" (Jess Brown) - 3:39
5. "Try Bein' Me" (Tim Mensy) - 3:57
6. "If You Wanna Get to Heaven" (Steve Cash, John Dillon) - 3:11
7. "The Stone" (Danny Mayo, Bob Regan) - 3:34
8. "Hangin' by a Thread" (Steve Bogard, Amanda Hunt-Taylor, Jeff Stevens) - 3:13
9. "As One as Two Can Get" (Steve Siler, Jim Weatherly) - 3:20
10. "Cheatin' on Her Heart" (Porter Howell, Mark D. Sanders) - 3:20
11. "Today I Started Loving You Again" (Merle Haggard, Bonnie Owens) - 3:44
  - feat. Merle Haggard
12. "Butterfly Kisses/Daddy's Little Girl" - 4:06^{A}
  - feat. Kippi Brannon

^{A}"Butterfly Kisses" composed by Bob Carlisle and Randy Thomas; "Daddy's Little Girl" composed by Angela Kaset, Kenya Walker, and Stan Webb.

== Personnel ==
- Jeff Carson – all vocals, harmonica, mouth harp
- John Hobbs – keyboards
- Steve Nathan – keyboards
- Farley Compton – electric guitars
- J. T. Corenflos – electric guitars
- Kerry Marx – electric guitars
- Brent Rowan - electric guitars
- Michael Spriggs – acoustic guitars
- Reggie Young – guitar overdubs
- Paul Franklin - steel guitar
- Mike Brignardello – bass
- David Hungate – bass
- Eddie Bayers – drums
- Greg Morrow – drums
- Terry McMillan – percussion, mouth harp
- Larry Franklin – fiddle
- Merle Haggard – vocals (11)
- Kippi Brannon – vocals (12)

== Production ==
- Chuck Howard – producer
- Merle Haggard – producer (11)
- Lesley Albert – production coordinator
- Daniel Kresco – production coordinator
- Neuman, Walker & Associates – art direction, design
- Sue Austin – album art coordinator
- John Chiasson – photography

=== Technical credits ===
- Gateway Mastering (Portland, Maine) – mastering location
- Glenn Meadows – mastering at Masterfonics
- Benny Quinn – vocal mastering at Masterfonics
- Bob Campbell-Smith – recording, overdub recording, vocal recording, vocal mixing
- Daniel Kresco – overdub recording
- Jeff Watkins – overdub recording
- Kevin Beamish – mixing

Assistant engineers

- Daniel Kresco – recording assistant, mix assistant
- Patrick Murphy – recording assistant
- Cameron Plato – recording assistant, vocal recording assistant
- Jeff Watkins – recording assistant, mix assistant, vocal recording assistant
- Craig White – recording assistant, vocal mix assistant
- Scott Ahaus – mix assistant
- Derek Bason – mix assistant
- Bob Campbell-Smith – mix assistant
- John Guess – mix assistant
- David Hall – mix assistant
- Chuck Howard – mix assistant
- Steve Marcantonio – mix assistant
- Csaba Pectoz – mix assistant
- John Thomas II – mix assistant

== Chart performance ==
Chart (1997)	Peak position
U.S. Billboard Top Country Albums	39
U.S. Billboard Top Heatseekers	28
