= The Car (song) =

Single by Jeff Carson

from the album Jeff Carson
- B-side: "Holdin' Onto Somethin'"
- Released: October 17, 1995
- Genre: Country
- Length: 3:32
- Label: MCG/Curb
- Songwriters: C. Michael Spriggs; Gary Heyde
- Producer: Chuck Howard

Jeff Carson singles chronology
"Not on Your Love" (1995)	"The Car" (1995)	"Holdin' Onto Something" (1996)

"The Car" is a song written by Gary Heyde and C. Michael Spriggs, and recorded by American country music artist Jeff Carson. It was released in October 1995 as the third single from his debut album Jeff Carson. The song reached number three on the Billboard Hot Country Singles & Tracks chart in December 1995.

== Content ==
The song is a ballad about a relationship between the narrator and his father. In the first verse, the narrator expresses desire for a Ford Mustang, but cannot get one due to his father being busy with work. The son nonetheless wants the car because it will offer "a chance to be with him".

In the second verse, the narrator says that he has let go of his dream of having a Mustang until he gets word that his father has died. He also finds that the father has left a note for him along with a set of keys for a Mustang. In the final chorus, the narrator states that "there will always be a part of us together in that car".

== Critical reception ==
A review in Billboard was positive, praising Carson's warm, affecting voice while calling it "one of the most powerfully moving songs released this year."

== Chart performance ==
The song debuted at number 64 on the U.S. Billboard Hot Country Singles & Tracks for the week of October 7, 1995.

Chart (1995)	Peak position
Canada Country Singles (RPM)	3
US Bubbling Under Hot 100 (Billboard)	13
US Hot Country Songs (Billboard)	3

=== Year-end charts ===
Chart (1996)	Position
Canada Country Tracks (RPM)	50
