= Not on Your Love =

"Not On Your Love"

Single by Jeff Carson

from the album Jeff Carson
- B-side: "Betty's Takin' Judo"
- Released: June 6, 1995
- Genre: Country
- Length: 3:21
- Label: Curb
- Songwriters: Tony Martin; Troy Martin; Reese Wilson
- Producer: Chuck Howard

Jeff Carson singles chronology
"Yeah Buddy" (1995)	"Not On Your Love" (1995)	"The Car" (1995)

"Not On Your Love" is a song written by Tony Martin, Troy Martin and Reese Wilson, and recorded by American country music artist Jeff Carson. It was released in June 1995 as the second single from his self-titled debut album. The song represents Carson's only Number One single on the Hot Country Singles & Tracks (now Hot Country Songs) chart.

The song's b-side, "Betty's Takin' Judo", was also the b-side to Carson's debut single "Yeah Buddy".

== Music video ==
The music video was directed by Jim Shea, and features Carson in a wall-themed projection world, intercut with scenes of him walking through an old house. Throughout the video, candles are burning, and Carson was standing the whole time. It premiered nationally on CMT in 1995, where it reached number one on CMT's Top 12 Countdown.

== Chart positions ==
Chart (1995)	Peak position
Canada Country Singles (RPM)	2
US Billboard Hot 100	97
US Hot Country Songs (Billboard)	1

=== Year-end charts ===
Chart (1995)	Position
Canada Country Tracks (RPM)	32
US Country Songs (Billboard)	12
