= Real to Reel =

Real to Reel may refer to:

- Real to Reel (Marillion album), 1984
- Real to Reel (Starcastle album), 1978
- Real to Reel (Tesla album), 2007
- Real to Reel, a 1979 album by Climax Blues Band
- Real to Reel, a 2003 compilation album by The Selecter
- Sound City: Real to Reel, the soundtrack to the 2013 documentary film Sound City
- Real to Reel International Film Festival, an American film festival

== See also ==
- Reel to Real (disambiguation)
- Reel to reel (disambiguation)
