= Cowboy Love =

Single by John Michael Montgomery

from the album John Michael Montgomery
- Released: November 13, 1995
- Recorded: 1995
- Genre: Country
- Length: 3:12
- Label: Atlantic
- Songwriters: Bill Douglas, Jeff Wood
- Producer: Scott Hendricks

John Michael Montgomery singles chronology
"No Man's Land" (1995)	"Cowboy Love" (1995)	"Long as I Live" (1996)

"Cowboy Love" is a song written by Jeff Wood and Bill Douglas, and recorded by American country music artist John Michael Montgomery. It was released in November 1995 as the fourth single from his album John Michael Montgomery. It peaked at number 4 in both the United States and Canada.

== Critical reception ==
Larry Flick, of Billboard magazine reviewed the song favorably saying that "Montgomery's winning delivery and Hendricks' deft production make this an enjoyable outing.

== Music video ==
The music video features John Michael Montgomery performing the song at a concert. The video starts out going from outside the arena, through the arena, as an instrumental medley of his past hits plays, and then to the stage, where he makes a surprise entry onto the stage as the song begins.

== Chart positions ==
"Cowboy Love" debuted at number 65 on the U.S. Billboard Hot Country Singles & Tracks for the week of November 18, 1995.

Chart (1995–1996)	Peak position
Canada Country Singles (RPM)	4
US Hot Country Songs (Billboard)	4

=== Year-end charts ===
Chart (1996)	Position
Canada Country Tracks (RPM)	48
US Country Songs (Billboard)	47
