= Real Life (Jeff Carson album) =

Studio album by Jeff Carson
- Released: September 4, 2001
- Recorded: 2001
- Studio: Starstruck Studios, Sound Stage Studios, Ocean Way Nashville, Curb Studios, Imagine Recording Studios and Backstage Studios (Nashville, Tennessee)
- Genre: Country
- Length: 37:13
- Label: Curb
- Producer: Max T. Barnes Justin Niebank

Jeff Carson chronology
Butterfly Kisses (1997)	Real Life (2001)

Professional ratings
Review scores
Source	Rating
AllMusic	3/5 stars
Country Standard Time	

Real Life is the third and final studio album by American country music artist Jeff Carson. It contains the single "Real Life (I Never Was the Same Again)", a top 20 hit on the Billboard country music charts in mid-2001 and Carson's first Top 40 country hit since 1996's "Holdin' Onto Something". None of the other singles from this album were Top 40 hits. After that album's release, Carson retired from the music business to become a police officer.

Justin Niebank produced tracks 1, 3, and 4, with songwriter Max T. Barnes producing the rest.

== Track listing ==
No.	Title	Writer(s)	Length
1.	"Real Life (I Never Was the Same Again)"	Jim Janosky, Neil Thrasher	4:21
2.	"My One and Only Love"	Max T. Barnes, Harlan Howard	4:20
3.	"Until We Fall Back in Love Again"	Jeff Carson, Philip Douglas, Jim Weatherly	3:51
4.	"I Almost Never Loved You"	Jennifer Bibeau, Brian Ede Nash, Rivers Rutherford	3:50
5.	"Shine On"	Jim Daddario, Tony Marty	3:31
6.	"Where Did I Go So Right"	Jim Collins, Craig Wiseman	3:39
7.	"What's Not to Love"	Max T. Barnes, Trey Bruce	3:04
8.	"Divine Intervention"	Phil Barnhart, Sam Hogin, Mark D. Sanders	3:19
9.	"It Wouldn't Kill Me"	Larry Boone, Paul Nelson, Tom Shapiro	3:15
10.	"Scars and All"	Carson, Weatherly	3:53

== Personnel ==
- Jeff Carson – lead vocals
- Steve Nathan – keyboards (1, 3, 4)
- Justin Niebank – keyboards (1, 3, 4), additional programming (1, 3, 4)
- Tony Harrell – keyboards (2, 5–10)
- Catherine Styron – keyboards (2, 5–10)
- Max T. Barnes – acoustic piano (2, 5–10), keyboards (2, 5–10), electric guitars (2, 5–10), bass (2, 5–10), backing vocals (5–9)
- B. James Lowry – acoustic guitars (1, 3, 4)
- Brent Mason – electric guitars (1, 3, 4)
- Kelly Back – electric guitars (2, 5–10)
- Larry Beaird – acoustic guitars (2, 5–10)
- Paul Franklin – steel guitar (1, 3, 4)
- Scotty Sanders – steel guitar (2, 5–10)
- Michael Rhodes – bass
- Glenn Worf – bass (2, 5–10)
- Chris McHugh – drums (1, 3, 4), programming (1, 3, 4)
- Lonnie Wilson – drums (2, 5–10)
- Eric Darken – percussion (1, 3, 4)
- Stuart Duncan – fiddle (1, 3, 4)
- Aubrey Haynie – fiddle (2, 5–10)
- John Catchings – cello (1)
- Kristin Wilkinson – viola (1)
- David Angell – violin (1)
- David Davidson – violin (1)
- Billy Davis – backing vocals (1, 3)
- Chip Davis – backing vocals (1, 3, 4)
- Karen Marley – backing vocals (1, 3)
- Amaleia Ruble – backing vocals (1, 3)
- Leslie Satcher – backing vocals (2)
- Bob Bailey – backing vocals (5)
- Vicki Hampton – backing vocals (5)
- Yvonne Hodges – backing vocals (5)
- John Wesley Ryles – backing vocals (5, 6)
- Lisa Silver – backing vocals (5, 8, 9)
- Connie Stitch – backing vocals (7)
- Amy Dalley – backing vocals (10)

== Production ==
- Justin Niebank – engineer (1, 3, 4), mixing (1, 3, 4)
- Craig White – engineer (2, 5–10), mixing (2, 5–10)
- Alex Chan – assistant engineer (1, 3, 4)
- Daniel Kresco – assistant engineer (2, 5–10)
- Jim Skinner – assistant engineer (2, 5–10)
- Aaron Swihart – assistant engineer (2, 5–10)
- The Work Station (Nashville, Tennessee) – digital editing location (2, 5–10)
- Robert Hadley – mastering
- Doug Sax – mastering
- The Mastering Lab (Hollywood, California) – mastering location
- Cathy White – production coordinator (2, 5–10)
- Russ Harrington – photography
- Glenn Sweitzer – art direction, design
- Trish Townsend – wardrobe stylist
- Sheila Davis – hair, make-up
- Sheila Shipley Biddy – management for Shipley Biddy Entertainment

== Chart performance ==
Chart (2001)	Peak position
U.S. Billboard Top Country Albums	38
U.S. Billboard Top Heatseekers	29
