= Reel to Real =

Reel to Real may refer to:

- Reel to Real (Canadian TV series), on Rogers TV
- Reel to Real (album), by Love, 1974
- Reel to Real (EP), by Swervedriver, 1991
- Reel 2 Real, an American music duo

== See also ==
- Real to Reel (disambiguation)
- Reel to reel (disambiguation)
