= Kippi Brannon =

American country music singer

- Born: Kippi Rolynn Binkley; 1966 (age 59–60); Nashville, Tennessee, U.S.
- Genres: Country
- Occupation: Singer
- Instrument: Vocals
- Years active: 1981–1982, 1988–1997
- Labels: MCA, Curb/Universal

Kippi Brannon (born Kippi Rolynn Binkley, 1966) is an American country music singer. She made her debut on the country music scene as a teenager, releasing four singles on MCA Records in the early 1980s before leaving her career in favor of a college education. By 1992, she returned to the country music scene, eventually releasing her debut album I'd Be with You in 1997.

== Early life ==
Kippi Rolynn Binkley was born in Nashville, Tennessee. A singer and musician at an early age, she began singing professionally before she was a teenager. At age 12, she gave a performance at a local shopping mall, when an executive for MCA Records discovered her. With the help of record producer Chuck Howard, Jr., Kippi was signed to MCA in 1981. Her surname was altered to Brannon, after Brannon Auto Parts, a local automotive parts store.

== Career ==
Brannon charted three singles in the early 1980s, in addition to receiving a New Female Vocalist of the Year nomination from the Academy of Country Music. She was also signed as an opening act for other country artists. Although she was gaining in popularity, Brannon decided to leave her career and attend college, first at Belmont University and later at the University of Tennessee-Knoxville. During her hiatus from the country music scene, she also married and had a daughter, Kasey; she later divorced and married a second time.

By 1988, Brannon resumed her music career, signing to Curb Records this time around. Her first single for the label, "I Ain't Never", failed to make the charts upon its 1992 release. Working with producers Matt Rollings and James Stroud, she began a search for additional songs to record; however, by the end of 1992, she once again had to take a hiatus, as she had divorced a second time, and had to care for her ailing father.

Her first album, I'd Be with You, was released in early 1997, under the production of Mark Bright. Though the album's first single, "Daddy's Little Girl", only reached number 42 on Billboard's Hot Country Songs chart -- which tracked only radio airplay at the time -- it was a retail success, spending 23 weeks and reaching number 6 on the Country Single Sales chart, and number 23 on the 1997 year-end Country Single Sales chart. The song was also blended with fellow Curb Records artist Jeff Carson's solo recording of Bob Carlisle's similarly-themed hit single "Butterfly Kisses" as an additional track on Carson's album of the same name. Like Brannon's single, Carson's version of "Butterfly Kisses" struggled on the airplay charts but was a sales success, spending 15 weeks on the Country Single Sales chart and peaking at number 6. I'd Be with You reached number 53 on the Top Country Albums chart.

Brannon has not recorded since.

== Discography ==
=== Albums ===
Title	Album details	Peak chart positions	
Title	Album details	US Country	US Heat
I'd Be with You	Release date: April 22, 1997; Label: Curb/Universal	53	48

=== Singles ===
Year	Single	Peak chart positions		Album
Year	Single	US Country	US Bubbling	Album
1981	"Slowly"	37	—	—N/a
1982	"If I Could See You Tonight"	55	—	—N/a
1982	"He Don't Make Me Cry"	87	—	—N/a
1983	"In My Dreams"	—	—	—N/a
1992	"I Ain't Never"	—	—	I'd Be with You
1997	"Daddy's Little Girl"	42	20	I'd Be with You
1997	"I'd Be with You"	53	20	I'd Be with You
1997	"The Greatest Love I've Ever Known"	—	—	I'd Be with You
"—" denotes releases that did not chart

=== Music videos ===
Year	Video	Director
1997	"Daddy's Little Girl"	John Scarpati
