= Austin Gary =

American writer (born 1947)

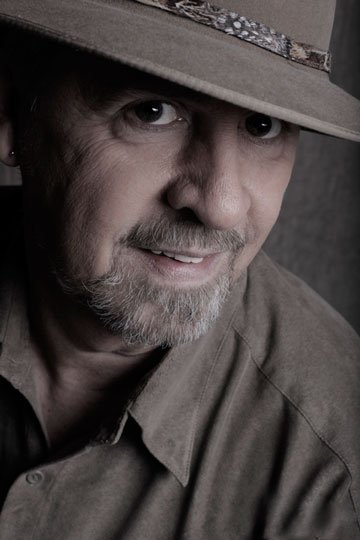
- Born: Gary Austin Heyde; March 7, 1947 (age 79); St. Joseph, Missouri, U.S.
- Occupations: Novelist; playwright; songwriter
- Writing career
- Genre: Literary fiction
- Website: yourlifereading.com

Austin Gary (born Gary Austin Heyde, March 7, 1947) is an American novelist and writer, best known as a songwriter for "The Car" by Jeff Carson (as Gary Heyde) and recordings by other country music performers like Tammy Wynette and John Berry, and as associate producer of albums by Carson, Berry and Hank Williams Jr.'s Hog Wild album.

== Career ==
=== Novels and plays ===
Gary has published four novels. They are: "Miss Madeira," "The Queerling," and "A Delicate Dance." His novel Miss Madeira and his unpublished novel Genius ("The Soul of Genius") have both been adapted into plays. His play "Walt Whitman (In Black & White) is a two-man play based on Walt Whitman. His most recent novel, "#LEO (Wannabe) SUPERHERO," is dedicated to Generation Alpha and proposes an idea to address homelessness in small towns across America.

=== Songwriting ===
- "One Stone at a Time" – Tammy Wynette
- "The Car" – Jeff Carson
- "Every Time My Heart Calls Your Name" – John Berry
- "The Letter" – Ronna Reeves
- "Dixie's Bar & Grill" – Brent Lamb
- "A Love Like This" – Cleve Francis
- "If Dreams Have Wings" – James T. Horn

=== Other ventures ===
Gary's Martin Luther King Jr. documentary film They Killed Martin: 3 Lives Forever Changed is available on YouTube. He has appeared on Seattle Public radio station KUOW-FM with personal stories about Thornton Wilder and the assassination of Martin Luther King Jr. as well as The Best of Stories on Stage.

Gary is also a high school teacher (in Haubstadt, Indiana; Franklin, Tennessee; Middle College, Tennessee; John Overton High School, and Big Picture, Washington), a numerologist and a former advertising creative director, radio/television jingle composer, and newspaper editor. He is a member of PEN Canada.

== Personal life ==
Gary is the son of Geoffrey Austin (Dutch) and Helen (née Heyser) Heyde, both deceased. In 1967, he married teacher and actress Glory (Kissel) Heyde. The marriage ended in 2002. He is the father of acclaimed stage director Rachel Rockwell, who died of ovarian cancer in 2018, and Jeremy Spencer, former drummer for heavy metal band Five Finger Death Punch.

He attended the University of Missouri (Columbia); Lincoln University (Jefferson City) and is a graduate of the University of Evansville (Indiana), with a degree in Speech and Drama.

== Bibliography ==
- Miss Madeira (2011) ISBN 978-0987782106
- The Queerling (2013) ISBN 978-1492326274
- A Delicate Dance (2015) ISBN 978-0692569528
- "#LEO (Wannabe) SUPERHERO ISBN 9798248496150

== Accolades ==
- 1996 BMI "Millionaire-Play" award for "The Car" by Jeff Carson
- 2015: "Book of the Year" (A DELICATE DANCE) in LGBT adult fiction by Foreword Reviews
