= No Man's Land (John Michael Montgomery song) =

Single by John Michael Montgomery

from the album John Michael Montgomery
- Released: August 21, 1995
- Genre: Country
- Length: 3:05
- Label: Atlantic
- Songwriters: Steve Seskin; John Scott Sherrill
- Producer: Scott Hendricks

John Michael Montgomery singles chronology
| "Sold (The Grundy County Auction Incident)" (1995) | "No Man's Land" (1995) | "Cowboy Love" (1995) |

"No Man's Land" is a song written by Steve Seskin and John Scott Sherrill, and recorded by American country music artist John Michael Montgomery. It was released in August 1995 as the third single from the album John Michael Montgomery. The song reached number 3 on the Billboard Hot Country Singles & Tracks chart.

== Content ==
The song is a ballad, discussing the challenge facing single mothers.

== Critical reception ==
Deborah Evans Price, of Billboard magazine reviewed the song favorably, calling it a "well-written tune that salutes one of American culture's unsung heroes." She also says that the song will "endear Montgomery to single moms everywhere."

== Music video ==
The music video was directed by Marc Ball and premiered in mid 1995.

== Chart performance ==
"No Man's Land" debuted at number 63 on the U.S. Billboard Hot Country Singles & Tracks for the week of August 26, 1995.

| Chart (1995) | Peak position |
|---|---|
| Canada Country Singles (RPM) | 2 |
| US Bubbling Under Hot 100 (Billboard) | 12 |
| US Hot Country Songs (Billboard) | 3 |

=== Year-end charts ===
| Chart (1995) | Position |
|---|---|
| Canada Country Tracks (RPM) | 16 |
| US Country Songs (Billboard) | 71 |
