= Reel to reel (disambiguation) =

Reel-to-reel audio tape recording is a type of audio tape recording using an open reel magnetic tape.

Reel to reel may also refer to:

- Open-reel video recording
- Reel to Reel, an album by Grand Puba
- Reel-to-reel processing, a manufacturing process involving a roll of a flexible material
- The Reel to Reel Picture Show, an America game show

== See also ==
- Reel to Real (disambiguation)
- Real to Reel (disambiguation)
