= In Real Life =

In Real Life may refer to:

- In real life, Internet term
- In Real Life (band), an American boy band emanating from the TV series Boy Band
- In Real Life (film), 2008 Dutch drama film directed by Robert Jan Westdijk
- In Real Life (TV series), Canadian reality television series
- In Real Life: My Journey to a Pixelated World, book by Joey Graceffa
- In Real Life (album), a 2022 album by Mandy Moore

== See also ==
- Dan in Real Life, 2007 American comedy-drama film directed by Peter Hedges
- Real Life (disambiguation)
