= Long as I Live (John Michael Montgomery song) =

Single by John Michael Montgomery

from the album John Michael Montgomery
- Released: February 26, 1996
- Genre: Country
- Length: 4:16
- Label: Atlantic
- Songwriters: Rick Bowles, Will Robinson
- Producer: Scott Hendricks

John Michael Montgomery singles chronology
"Cowboy Love" (1995)	"Long as I Live" (1996)	"Ain't Got Nothin' on Us" (1996)

"Long as I Live" is a song written by Rick Bowles and Will Robinson, and recorded by American country music artist John Michael Montgomery. It was released in February 1996 as the fifth and final single from the album John Michael Montgomery. The song reached number 4 on the Billboard Hot Country Singles & Tracks chart.

== Critical reception ==
Larry Flick, of Billboard magazine reviewed the song negatively saying that it sounds too much like territory he has covered before. He does state that Montgomery has "quite the flair for delivering positive love ballads."

== Chart performance ==
"Long as I Live" debuted at number 57 on the U.S. Billboard Hot Country Singles & Tracks for the week of March 2, 1996.

Chart (1996)	Peak position
Canada Country Singles (RPM)	4
US Hot Country Songs (Billboard)	4

=== Year-end charts ===
Chart (1996)	Position
Canada Country Tracks (RPM)	59
US Country Songs (Billboard)	40
