= Holdin' Onto Something =

Single by Jeff Carson

from the album Jeff Carson
- Released: March 2, 1996
- Genre: Country
- Length: 2:51
- Label: MCG/Curb
- Songwriters: Tom Shapiro; Thom McHugh
- Producer: Chuck Howard

Jeff Carson singles chronology
"The Car" (1995)	"Holdin' Onto Something" (1996)	"That Last Mile" (1996)

"Holdin' Onto Something" is a song written by Tom Shapiro and Thom McHugh, and recorded by American country music artist Jeff Carson. It was released in March 1996, as the fourth single from his debut album by Jeff Carson. The song reached number 6 on the Billboard Hot Country Singles & Tracks chart in June 1996. Before its release, it was the b-side to the album's third single, "The Car".

It was also recorded by John Michael Montgomery on his 1995 self-titled album.

== Chart performance ==
Chart (1996)	Peak position
Canada Country Singles (RPM)	20
US Hot Country Songs (Billboard)	6
