= Réel =

Studio album by Kery James
- Released: 27 April 2009
- Genre: French hip hop

Kery James chronology
À l'ombre du show business (2008)	Réel (2009)	À mon public (2010)

Réel is the fourth studio album by the French rapper Kery James, released on 27 April 2009.

The album was a commercial success, led by the singles taken from the album: Le Retour du rap français, Je représente and Lettre à mon public. It was a number one album in France with 23000 copies sold in the first week. The album was certified platinum with more than 100000 copies sold.

== Track listing ==
The singers are also credited as authors, in addition to the participation of Admiral T as a writer on the first track, and Médine on Track 7.

No.	Title	Writer(s)	Length
1.	"Le Retour du rap français"	Nino	6:50
2.	"Réel"	Blastar	6:54
3.	"Je représente"	Wealstarr	4:26
4.	"Yeah"	Nino	4:48
5.	"La Poudre aux yeux"	Dj Maître et Tefa	5:05
6.	"Le Prix de la vérité" (with Médine)	Greg K.	5:03
7.	"Au pays des droits de l'Homme ?"	Jay Jo	4:28
8.	"Le Respect du silence" (with Le Rat Luciano)		5:30
9.	"Paro"	Nino	4:58
10.	"En manque de..." (with Mr Toma)	Razkuor	5:26
11.	"Avec le cœur & la raison"	Dj Maître, Tefa et Greg K.	9:10
12.	"Promis à la victoire" (with Admiral T)	Tommy Djibz	4:17
13.	"Lettre à mon public"	Greg K.	7:26
Total length:			74:17

== Chart performance ==
=== Weekly charts ===
Chart (2009)	Peak position
Belgian Albums (Ultratop Wallonia)	12
French Albums (SNEP)	1
Swiss Albums (Schweizer Hitparade)	33

=== Year-end charts ===
Chart (2009)	Position
French Albums (SNEP)	55

== Certifications ==
Country	Certifications	Sales certifications
(France) (SNEP)	Platinum	100 000
