= Reel Life =

Reel Life may refer to:

- Reel Life (Boy Meets Girl album)
- Reel Life (Sonny Rollins album)
- Reel Life Productions, a record label
- Reel Life, an album by Will Taylor
- Reel Life, an album by Trout Fishing in America
- Reel Life, Vol. 1, an album by Wild Colonials

== See also ==
- Real Life (disambiguation)
