= Kickin' It Up =

Studio album by John Michael Montgomery
- Released: January 25, 1994
- Recorded: 1993
- Studio: The Castle (Franklin, TN); Midtown Tone & Volume, Recording Arts and Woodland Sound Studios (Nashville, TN)
- Genre: Country
- Length: 34:26
- Label: Atlantic
- Producer: Scott Hendricks

John Michael Montgomery chronology
Life's a Dance (1992)	Kickin' It Up (1994)	John Michael Montgomery (1995)

Singles from Kickin' It Up
- 1. "I Swear" Released: November 19, 1993; 2. "Rope the Moon" Released: March 14, 1994; 3. "Be My Baby Tonight" Released: May 23, 1994; 4. "If You've Got Love" Released: September 19, 1994

Professional ratings
Review scores
Source	Rating
AllMusic	4.5/5 stars
Entertainment Weekly	B
New Country	3.5/5 stars

Kickin' It Up is the second studio album by American country music artist John Michael Montgomery. It was released on January 25, 1994, through Atlantic Records. Prior to its release, Montgomery has previous successes with his debut album, which he was previously won CMA's "Best New Artist" and ACM's "Top New Male Vocalist" accolades.

On February 19 of the same year, the album reached #1 on the Billboard 200. Four songs were released from it: "I Swear," "Rope the Moon," "Be My Baby Tonight" and "If You've Got Love." Three of the singles reached No. 1 on the Billboard Hot Country Singles & Tracks chart, while "Rope the Moon" was a #4. "Be My Baby Tonight" and "I Swear" both crossed over into the Hot 100, peaking at #73 and #42, respectively. Additionally, "Kick It Up" peaked at #72 from unsolicited airplay. "I Swear" was later covered by pop group All-4-One, whose version was also a Number One hit in several countries.

== Commercial performance ==
Kickin' It Up debuted at number three on the Billboard 200, with copies selling 94,000 in its first week. It peaked at the top spot on its selling week, selling almost 109,000 copies. From 1994 to 1995, the album remained on the main chart for 82 consecutive weeks, marking the longest chart run of Montgomery's career. The album topped the country albums chart for six weeks and remained on the chart for a total of 126 weeks. On March 14, the album was certified gold and platinum by the Recording Industry Association of America (RIAA), denoting 1,000,000 units sold. It was certified double platinum on August 11, triple platinum on January 4, 1995, and quadruple platinum on June 13, 1996, denoting over 4,000,000 copies sold. The video album was also certified gold in the US for 50,000 shipments.

Internationally, Kickin' It Up only charted in two countries. In Canada, the album peaked at number 23 on the overall chart and reached number one on the Canadian Country chart. In the UK, it peaked at number 15 in the country chart. It was then certified double platinum in Canada, denoting over 200,000 copies sold.

== Critical reception ==
Giving it 3.5 out of 5 stars, Brian Mansfield wrote in New Country magazine that "On Kickin' It Up...Montgomery captures the personality he has spent the last year developing on stage." He praised Montgomery's energy on "Friday at Five" and "Be My Baby Tonight" in particular.

== Track listing ==
No.	Title	Writer(s)	Length
1.	"Be My Baby Tonight"	Richard Fagan, Ed Hill	2:50
2.	"Full-Time Love"	Carson Chamberlain, Zack Turner	2:53
3.	"I Swear"	Gary Baker, Frank J. Myers	4:22
4.	"She Don't Need a Band to Dance"	Randy Archer, Freddy Weller	3:21
5.	"All In My Heart"	Mike Geiger, Woody Mullis	3:46
6.	"Friday at Five"	Jimmy Alan Stewart, George Teren	2:41
7.	"Rope the Moon"	Aggie Brown, Jess Brown, Jimmy Denton	4:06
8.	"If You've Got Love"	Mark D. Sanders, Steve Seskin	3:54
9.	"Oh How She Shines"	Pat Bunch, Doug Johnson	3:14
10.	"Kick It Up"	Andy Byrd, Jim Robinson	3:17

== Production ==
- Scott Hendricks – producer, overdub recording, mixing
- John Guess – recording
- Jeff Balding – mixing (10)
- Amy Hughes – recording assistant
- John Kunz – recording assistant, additional engineer, mix assistant, production assistant
- Marty Williams – recording assistant
- Hank Williams – mastering at MasterMix (Nashville, Tennessee)
- Virginia Team – art direction
- Jerry Joyner – design
- Karen Miller – photography
- Lori Turk – make-up
- Hallmark Direction Co. – management

== Personnel ==
As listed in the liner notes.

- John Michael Montgomery – vocals
- John Barlow Jarvis – acoustic piano (2), Hammond B3 organ (2, 10)
- Reese Wynans – acoustic piano (2–10), Hammond B3 organ (5, 7)
- Bill Cuomo – synthesizers (3, 7, 9)
- Steve Gibson – acoustic guitars (1–3, 6, 8, 9)
- Dann Huff – electric guitars (1–9), acoustic guitars (10)
- Brent Mason – electric guitars
- Billy Joe Walker Jr. – acoustic guitars (4, 5, 7, 10)
- Paul Franklin – pedal steel guitar
- Glenn Worf – bass
- Lonnie Wilson – drums
- Stuart Duncan – fiddle, mandolin (8)
- John Wesley Ryles – backing vocals (1, 2, 4–6, 8–10)
- Dennis Wilson – backing vocals (1–9)
- Harry Stinson – backing vocals (3, 7)

Group vocals on "Kick It Up"

- Mike Janas, John Kunz, Mimi Nuyens, Harry Stinson, Bruce Sulfridge and Dennis Wilson

== Charts ==
=== Weekly charts ===
Chart (1994)	Peak position
Canadian Albums (RPM)	23
Canadian Country Albums (RPM)	1
UK Country Albums (OCC)	15
US Billboard 200	1
US Top Country Albums (Billboard)	1

=== Year-end charts ===
Chart (1994)	Position
US Billboard 200	35
US Top Country Albums (Billboard)	4
Chart (1995)	Position
US Billboard 200	119
US Top Country Albums (Billboard)	19

== Certifications ==
Region	Certification	Certified units/sales
Canada (Music Canada)	2× Platinum	200,000^{^}
United States (RIAA)	4× Platinum	4,000,000^{^}
United States (RIAA) Video	Gold	50,000^{^}
^{^} Shipments figures based on certification alone.
