= Le Combat Continue =

Le combat continue

Studio album by Idéal J
- Released: 1998
- Recorded: 1998
- Genres: Hip hop, hardcore rap
- Length: 75:24

Idéal J chronology
O'riginal MC's sur une mission (1996)	Le combat continue (1998)

Le Combat Continue is the second studio album by French Hip Hop group, Idéal J. The album is considered a classic in French hip hop music. The lead single "Hardcore" caused a huge controversy in France.

The album reached #21 on the SNEP, the official French Albums Chart, in October 1998.

The single "Hardcore" from the album appeared on the SNEP French Singles Chart for ten weeks, reaching its peak position at #67.

== Track listing ==
1. "Le combat continue 2"
2. "Introduction"
3. "Message" (feat. Leila)
4. "Pour une poignée de dollars..."
5. "Blast Masta Killa"
6. "Un nuage de fumée"
7. "Evitez" (feat. Daddy Mory)
8. "R.A.S. 1" (feat. Different Teep)
9. "Sur violents breakbeats"
10. "Hardcore"
11. "J'ai mal au cœur"
12. "L'amour" (feat. Rohff and Demon One)
13. "Ideal J" (feat. Hasheem & Zahariya) / "Operation coup 2 pompe"
14. "Showbizness 98" (feat. AP, Karlito, Dry and OGB)
15. "Si je rappe ici"

== Samples ==
Le combat continue

- "The Music Band" by War

Introduction

- "Darkest Light" by Lafayette Afro Rock Band
- "Blow Your Head" by The J.B.'s

Message

- "Kismet" by Amon Düül 2

Pour une poignée de dollars...

- "Truc de fou" by 113 and Doudou Masta

Un nuage de fumée

- "Living Inside Your Love" by Earl Klugh

Evitez

- "Les Deux Pigeons" by Charles Aznavour

R.A.S. 1

- "Big Sur Suite" by Johnny Hammond

Sur violents breakbeats

- "Harmonique" by John Coltrane

Hardcore

- "Como Fué" by Paquito D'Rivera

J'ai mal au cœur

- "Manha de Carnaval" by Stan Getz et Astrud Gilberto

L'amour

- "Looking In" by Mariah Carey

Idéal J

- "I Wanna Do Something Freaky For You" by Leon Haywood
- "Ain't Nothin But a G Thang" by Dr. Dre and Snoop Dogg

Si je rappe ici

- "Summertime / The Ghetto" by Johnny Hammond
