= O'riginal MC's sur une mission =

Studio album by Idéal J
- Released: 1996
- Recorded: 1996
- Genres: hip hop, hardcore rap
- Producer: DJ Mehdi

Idéal J chronology
O'riginal MC's sur une mission (1996)	Le combat continue (1998)

O'riginal MC's sur une mission is the debut album of the French rap formation Idéal J that was released in 1996.

== Production ==
The album was produced entirely by DJ Mehdi. The album showed the potential of a young, sample-obsessed perfectionist beatmaker who went on to win over MC Solaar.

== Track list ==
1. "Le combat continue"
2. "Ghettolude I"
3. "Je dois faire du cash"
4. "Comme personne ne l'a..."
5. "Le ghetto français"
6. "Ghettolude II: Histoire vraie"
7. "Show bizness"
8. "Uniquement pour les miens"
9. "Le ghetto" (remixed by Yvan)
10. "Ghettolude III: Fidèle au Hip-Hop"
11. "O'riginal MC's"
