= Real Life (I Never Was the Same Again) =

Single by Jeff Carson

from the album Real Life
- Released: May 26, 2001
- Genre: Country
- Length: 4:21
- Label: Curb
- Songwriters: Jim Janosky; Neil Thrasher
- Producer: Justin Niebank

Jeff Carson singles chronology
"Scars and All" (2000)	"Real Life (I Never Was the Same Again)" (2001)	"Until We Fall Back in Love Again" (2002)

"Real Life (I Never Was the Same Again)" is a song written by Neil Thrasher and Jim Janosky, and recorded by American country music artist Jeff Carson. It released in May 2001 as the third single from his third album, Real Life. The song was written by Neil Thrasher and Jim Janosky. It was nominated for Song of the Year at the 2001 Christian Country Music Awards.

== Music video ==
The music video was directed by David Abbott and premiered in September 2001.

== Chart performance ==
"Real Life (I Never Was the Same Again)" debuted at number 54 on the U.S. Billboard Hot Country Singles & Tracks chart for the week of May 26, 2001.

Chart (2001)	Peak position
US Hot Country Songs (Billboard)	14
US Billboard Bubbling Under Hot 100	3

=== Year-end charts ===
Chart (2001)	Position
US Country Songs (Billboard)	47
