= Jeff Carson =

American country music artist (1963–2022)

- Carson in a promotional picture

Background information
- Born: Jeffrey Lee Herndon; December 16, 1963; Tulsa, Oklahoma, U.S.
- Origin: Gravette, Arkansas, U.S.
- Died: March 26, 2022 (aged 58) Franklin, Tennessee, U.S.
- Genres: Country
- Occupation: Singer
- Instruments: Vocals, harmonica, bass guitar
- Years active: 1980–2012, 2019–2022
- Label: Curb

Jeffrey Lee Herndon (December 16, 1963 – March 26, 2022), known professionally as Jeff Carson, was an American country music artist. Originally a session musician in Branson, Missouri, and later a demo singer, he was signed to Curb Records in 1995, releasing his self-titled debut album that year, followed by Butterfly Kisses in 1998 and Real Life in 2002. He charted 14 singles on the Billboard country charts, including the Number One hit "Not on Your Love", the Top Ten hits "The Car" and "Holdin' Onto Something", and the Top 20 "Real Life (I Never Was the Same Again)". He retired from music in 2009 and became a police officer.

== Biography ==
Jeffrey Lee Herndon was born in Tulsa, Oklahoma, and raised in Gravette, Arkansas. In his childhood, he played harmonica and guitar and sang in church. In high school, he and some friends formed a band. They won second place at a local talent show for performing the song "Seven Bridges Road". After graduating, he attended another talent competition held at a park in Rogers, Arkansas. The winner of that competition then asked Carson to play in his band. The band split up after four years.

Carson later moved on to Branson, Missouri, where he found work playing bass guitar in local bands, in addition to writing songs. While in Branson, he met his then-future wife, who persuaded him to move to Nashville, Tennessee, which he did in 1989. They married in 1989. In Nashville, he found work with a band that played at the Opryland Hotel, before convincing the hotel to book him as a solo act. He eventually recorded demos for other artists, before he was discovered by record producer Chuck Howard in 1994 and signed to Curb Records.

== Music career ==
=== 1995–1996: Jeff Carson ===
Carson's debut single, "Yeah Buddy", was released in early 1995, peaking at number 69 on the U.S. Billboard Hot Country Singles & Tracks chart. It was followed by "Not on Your Love", which became his only number one later that year. Both singles were included on his debut album, titled Jeff Carson, which produced two more Top Ten hits in "The Car" (number 3) and "Holdin' Onto Something" (number 6), the latter of which was previously recorded by John Michael Montgomery. Between those two singles was a Christmas release called "Santa Got Lost in Texas" (number 70), The album's last single was "That Last Mile" at number 62. In 1996, Carson won the Academy of Country Music’s Video of the Year for "The Car". He also co-wrote the song "Whoop-De-Do" on Keith Gattis' 1996 self-titled debut. Jeff Carson received a mixed review from Country Standard Time, whose Larry Stephens said that "Carson's songs are all good, but nothing sticks or grabs the heart strings."

=== 1997–1999: Butterfly Kisses ===
Carson released his second album in 1997. Entitled Butterfly Kisses, this album produced four singles, none of which reached top 40: "Do It Again" at number 55; the album's title track (number 62), which was also a number 1 Adult Contemporary hit and minor country hit for Bob Carlisle as well as a Top 40 pop and country hit for the Raybon Brothers; "Here's the Deal" (number 64); and "Cheatin' on Her Heart" (number 52). This album also included an alternative mix of "Butterfly Kisses" which combined elements of labelmate Kippi Brannon's then-current single "Daddy's Little Girl", as well as a duet with Merle Haggard on a rendition of his hit "Today I Started Loving You Again".

=== 1998–2002: Real Life ===
His eleventh single, "Shine On", was released in 1998. After it, too, failed to reach Top 40, Carson's third album was repeatedly delayed. "Scars and All" did not reach the country charts, but was a number 1 on the PowerSource Christian charts. Following it in 2001 was his first Top 40 country single in five years, "Real Life (I Never Was the Same Again)". It reached number 14 at the end of the year, and was followed by the release of his third studio album, also called Real Life. In 2002, Carson suffered a broken vertebra in a sledding accident at home. Although he briefly spent some time in a body cast, he was not seriously injured. Another single from Real Life, entitled "Until We Fall Back in Love Again", peaked at number 47.

=== 2003–2022: Return to music and police work ===
Carson charted again in 2003 with his cover of the Christian pop hit "I Can Only Imagine", a cut from a multi-artist compilation called God Bless the USA 2003. He also co-wrote the track "Where Has My Hometown Gone" on Craig Morgan's album I Love It, as well as Elbert West's single "Kimberly Cooper's Eyes". A duet with Lisa Brokop entitled "God Save the World", released in 2005, also failed to chart. His most recent single, "When You Said You Loved Me", was sent to radio in early 2007, as the lead-off single to an upcoming Greatest Hits package. The single failed to chart, however, and his Greatest Hits album was cancelled. In February 2009, he retired from the music business and joined the Franklin, Tennessee, police force as a full-time police officer.

== Death ==
Carson died from a heart attack at a hospital in Franklin, Tennessee, on March 26, 2022, at the age of 58.

== Discography ==
=== Albums ===
==== Studio albums ====
Title	Album details	Peak chart positions			
Title	Album details	US Country	US	US Heat	CAN Country
Jeff Carson	Release date: May 2, 1995; Label: MCG/Curb Records	22	152	7	4
Butterfly Kisses	Release date: June 24, 1997; Label: Curb Records	39	—	28	—
Real Life	Release date: September 4, 2001; Label: Curb Records	38	—	29	x
"—" denotes the album failed to chart or not released "x" denotes that no relevant chart existed at the time

==== Compilation albums ====
Title	Album details
Best of Jeff Carson – I Can Only Imagine	Release date: May 28, 2013; Label: Curb Records (Digital Only)

=== Singles ===
Year	Single	Peak chart positions			Album
Year	Single	US Country	US	CAN Country	Album
1995	"Yeah Buddy"	69	—	—	Jeff Carson
1995	"Not on Your Love"	1	97	2	Jeff Carson
1995	"The Car"	3	— (Note: "The Car" did not enter the Billboard Hot 100, but peaked at number 13 on Bubbling Under Hot 100 Singles.)	3	Jeff Carson
1996	"Holdin' Onto Something"	6	—	20	Jeff Carson
1996	"That Last Mile"	62	—	—	Jeff Carson
1997	"Do It Again"	55	—	95	Butterfly Kisses
1997	"Butterfly Kisses"	66	— (Note: "Butterfly Kisses" did not enter the Billboard Hot 100, but peaked at number 3 on Bubbling Under Hot 100 Singles.)	—	Butterfly Kisses
1997	"Here's the Deal"	64	— (Note: "Butterfly Kisses" did not enter the Billboard Hot 100, but peaked at number 1 on Bubbling Under Hot 100 Singles.)	—	Butterfly Kisses
1998	"Cheatin' on Her Heart"	52	—	97	Butterfly Kisses
1998	"Shine On"	49	—	—	Real Life
2000	"Scars and All"	—	—	—	Real Life
2001	"Real Life (I Never Was the Same Again)"	14	— (Note: "Real Life" did not enter the Billboard Hot 100, but peaked at number 3 on Bubbling Under Hot 100 Singles.)	—	Real Life
2002	"Until We Fall Back in Love Again"	46	—	—	Real Life
2003	"I Can Only Imagine"	50	—	—	God Bless the USA 2003
2005	"God Save the World" (with Lisa Brokop)	—	—	—	Best of America, Vol. 2
2006	"When You Said You Loved Me"	—	—	—	—N/a
"—" denotes releases that did not chart

=== Other charted songs ===
Year	Single	Peak positions	Album
Year	Single	US Country	Album
1995	"Santa Got Lost in Texas"	70	—N/a

=== Music videos ===
Year	Video	Director
1995	"Yeah Buddy"	Sara Nichols
1995	"Not on Your Love"	Jim Shea
1995	"The Car"	Michael Salomon
1996	"That Last Mile"	Greg Crutcher
1998	"Shine On"	David Abbott
2001	"Real Life (I Never Was the Same Again)"	David Abbott
2020	"God Save The World"	

== Awards and nominations ==
Year	Organization	Award	Nominee/Work	Result
1996	Academy of Country Music Awards	Video of the Year	"The Car"	Won
